= 2026 Swedish local elections =

- 13 September 2026

1,720 seats in regional councils; 12,536 seats in municipal councils; 21 regional council prefects
Party	Social Democrats	Moderate	Sweden Democrats
Councillors	4,035	3,141	2,203
Councillors %	28.30%	22.03%	15.45%
Councillors +/-	▼312	▲229	▼163
Party	Centre	Left	Christian Democrats
Councillors	1,256	999	928
Councillors %	8.81%	7.01%	6.51%
Councillors +/-	▼77	▲41	▲40
Party	Other parties	Green	Liberals
Councillors	704	562	428
Councillors %	4.94%	3.94%	3.00%
Councillors +/-	▲88	▲222	▼138

Local elections were held in Sweden on 13 September 2026 to elect the 21 regional councils and 290 municipal councils. These elections occurred concurrently with the general election.

== Background ==
Local government in Sweden is divided into two levels of democratic representation: the regional level and the municipal level. Both levels are governed by the Local Government Act (Kommunallagen) adopted in 1991. Regions and municipalities do not hold legislative powers; nonetheless, they do have executive powers in taxation (including the right to levy income taxes), and administration at their respective levels.

The 2026 elections follow the 2022 elections, which saw a shift toward right-wing and center-right coalitions in several major regions, while the Social Democrats remained the dominant party in the northern parts of the country. Key issues for the 2026 cycle are expected to include healthcare accessibility, regional public transport, and the economic integration of rural municipalities.

== Electoral system ==
Sweden uses a proportional representation system for all local elections. To vote in local elections, a person must be at least 18 years old. Unlike national elections, non-Swedish citizens can vote if they are EU citizens or if they have been registered residents in Sweden for at least three consecutive years. Seats are allocated using the Modified Sainte-Laguë method. A statutory threshold of 3% applies to regional council elections, while municipal elections have a threshold of either 2% or 3%, depending on the size of the electoral district.

== Regional councils ==
Regional councils are responsible for healthcare, public transport, culture, and regional development. The political leadership of a region is headed by the Chair of the Regional Board (Regionstyrelsens ordförande), who is elected by each regional council via majority. The regional councils have a combined total of 1,720 seats.

Party	Votes	%	Seats	+/–
Social Democrats	1,951,358	29.10	530	–46
Moderate Party	1,429,450	21.32	359	+31
Sweden Democrats	925,702	13.81	253	–22
Left Party	645,406	9.63	155	+8
Christian Democrats	500,384	7.46	138	+5
Centre Party	437,175	6.52	118	–2
Green Party	351,615	5.24	72	+41
Other lots	241,868	3.61	63	+10
Liberals	222,050	3.31	32	–25
Total	6,705,008	100.00	1,720	+69
Valid votes	6,705,008	97.88		
Invalid votes	40,558	0.59		
Blank votes	104,560	1.53		
Total votes	6,850,126	100.00		
Registered voters/turnout	8,351,769	82.02		
Source: Election Authority

Regions of Sweden

ISO	County	Regional Council	Incumbent Chair of the Regional Board		Elected Chair	
ISO	County	Regional Council	Name	Party	Name	Paty
AB	Stockholm	Region Stockholm	Aida Hadžialić	S		
C	Uppsala	Region Uppsala	Helena Proos	S		
D	Södermanland	Region Sörmland	Christoffer Öqvist	M		
E	Östergötland	Region Östergötland	Marie Morell	M		
F	Jönköping	Region Jönköping County	Rachel De Basso	S		
G	Kronoberg	Region Kronoberg	Mikael Johansson	M		
H	Kalmar	Region Kalmar County	Angelica Katsanidou	S		
I	Gotland	Region Gotland	Meit Fohlin	S		
K	Blekinge	Region Blekinge	Robert Lindén	SD		
M	Skåne	Region Skåne	Carl Johan Sonesson	M		
N	Halland	Region Halland	Mikaela Waltersson	M		
O	Västra Götaland	Region Västra Götaland	Helén Eliasson	S		
S	Värmland	Region Värmland	Åsa Johansson	S		
T	Örebro	Region Örebro County	Andreas Svahn	S		
U	Västmanland	Region Västmanland	Mikael Andersson Elfgren	M		
W	Dalarna	Region Dalarna	Elin Norén	S		
X	Gävleborg	Region Gävleborg	Patrik Stenvard	M		
Y	Västernorrland	Region Västernorrland	Glenn Nordlund	S		
Z	Jämtland	Region Jämtland Härjedalen	Bengt Bergqvist	S		
AC	Västerbotten	Region Västerbotten	Peter Olofsson	S		
BD	Norrbotten	Region Norrbotten	Anders Öberg	S		

== Municipal councils ==
The 290 municipal councils represent the most local level of government, responsible for local roads, schools, social services, urban planning, waste management and environmental protection. These elections will determine the distribution of approximately 12,536 seats nationwide. Following the elections, the new municipal councils will appoint municipal executive committees (kommunstyrelser).

Party	Votes	%	Seats	+/–
Social Democrats	1,881,503	27.77	3,505	–266
Moderate Party	1,494,378	22.06	2,782	+198
Sweden Democrats	906,886	13.39	1,950	–141
Left Party	602,730	8.90	844	+33
Centre Party	502,394	7.42	1,138	–75
Green Party	381,054	5.63	490	+181
Christian Democrats	374,202	5.52	790	+35
Other lots	360,066	5.32	641	+78
Liberals	271,064	4.00	396	–113
Total	6,774,277	100.00	12,536	–78
Valid votes	6,774,277	98.03		
Invalid votes	51,006	0.74		
Blank votes	85,201	1.23		
Total votes	6,910,484	100.00		
Registered voters/turnout	8,401,238	82.26		
Source: Election Authority

== Referendums ==
Four municipalities will hold referendums simultaneously with the municipal elections.

=== Ljungby Municipality ===
In Ljungby Municipality, the following question was asked:

Should the local authority, via a transmission pipeline between Ljungby and Bollstad, extend the municipal water and sewerage networks along the eastern shore of Lake Bolmen and facilitate the construction of a new footpath and cycle path along this stretch?

Choice	Votes	%
For	4,494	31.38
Against	7,593	53.02
Abstain	2,233	15.59
Total	14,320	100.00
Valid votes	14,320	98.02
Invalid/blank votes	290	1.98
Total votes	14,610	100.00
Registered voters/turnout	22,704	64.35
Source: ljungby.se

=== Leksand Municipality ===
In Leksand Municipality, the following question was asked:

Should the local authority work towards being able to offer support for private roads in accordance with current legislation, regulations and agreements?

Voters could choose one of the following options:

Option 1
Yes, but this commitment must not result in cuts to local welfare services and/or tax increases.
Option 2
Yes, even if this commitment involves cuts to local authority welfare services and/or tax increases.
Option 3
No, I believe that the road's owner should bear the costs.

Choice	Votes	%
Option 1	3,520	37.89
Option 2	4,241	45.66
Option 3	494	5.32
Abstain	1,034	11.13
Total	9,289	100.00
Valid votes	9,289	98.92
Invalid/blank votes	101	1.08
Total votes	9,390	100.00
Registered voters/turnout	13,157	71.37
Source: leksand.se

=== Mark Municipality ===
In Mark Municipality, the following question was asked:

Could the middle school years (Years 4–6) at the schools in Björketorp, Fotskäl, Öxabäck and Torestorp be relocated?

Choice	Votes	%
For	2,107	12.51
Against	12,475	74.08
Abstain	2,259	13.41
Total	16,841	100.00
Valid votes	16,841	97.83
Invalid votes	44	0.26
Blank votes	329	1.91
Total votes	17,214	100.00
Registered voters/turnout	27,764	62.00
Source: mark.se

=== Tierp Municipality ===
In Tierp Municipality, the following question was asked:

How should Tierp Municipality’s business premises are to be owned?

Voters could choose one of the following options:

Option 1
You want the municipality's business premises to be owned by the municipal company Tierps kommunfastigheter AB (TKAB). Business premises currently owned directly by the municipality are to be purchased by the municipal company (TKAB).
Option 2
You want the municipal business premises to be owned directly by the municipality. Business premises previously purchased by the municipal company Tierps kommunfastigheter AB (TKAB) are to be repurchased by the municipality.

Choice	Votes	%
Option 1	1,336	11.87
Option 2	8,081	71.81
Abstain	1,836	16.32
Total	11,253	100.00
Valid votes	11,253	99.70
Invalid/blank votes	34	0.30
Total votes	11,287	100.00
Registered voters/turnout	16,803	67.17
Source: tierp.se
