= Region Halland =

Regional council of Halland County, Sweden

- Regional Council
- Formation: 2011
- County: Halland County
- Country: Sweden
- Website: www.regionhalland.se

Legislative branch
- Legislature: Regional Council
- Speaker: Mats Eriksson
- Assembly members: 71

Executive branch
- Chairman of the Regional Executive Board: Mats Eriksson
- Headquarters: Halmstad

Region Halland is the regional council for Halland County, Sweden. It was formed in its current structure on 1 January 2011 through direct elections in the 2010 county council elections. The region is responsible for tasks typically handled by a region, including healthcare, dental care, public transport, and regional development coordination.

== Healthcare ==
Region Halland is part of both the Western and Southern healthcare regions. The northern part of the region, including the municipalities of Kungsbacka, Varberg, and Falkenberg, forms a healthcare region together with Västra Götaland County. The southern part of the county, including Halmstad, Hylte, and Laholm, forms part of the Southern healthcare region, which includes other regions such as Region Skåne, Region Kronoberg, and Region Blekinge, making Halland unique in being divided between two different healthcare regions.

The region is home to the following hospitals:

- Halland Hospital, Halmstad
- Halland Hospital, Varberg
- Halland Hospital, Kungsbacka

In 2007, Region Halland introduced Vårdval Halland, a healthcare choice system for primary care.

== Public Transport ==
Region Halland is the regional public transport authority for the county. Operational responsibility for traffic lies with its subsidiary Hallandstrafiken, with the exception of Kungsbacka Municipality, where Västtrafik manages public transport.

== Politics ==
Region Halland is governed by a coalition of centre-right parties, consisting of the Moderates, Centre Party, Liberals, and Christian Democrats, which has governed in a minority since the 2022 elections.

The centre-right parties have been larger than the socialist parties in every election from 1912 to 2018. Until the 2014 election, the four centre-right parties had a majority in the region, and they regained this majority in the 2018 election. However, in 2022, the majority was lost, and the centre-right parties now govern as a minority.

=== Electoral Districts ===
The region is divided into four electoral districts for regional elections:

- Kungsbacka
- Varberg
- Falkenberg–Hylte
- Halmstad–Laholm

== Other Activities ==
Region Halland is the principal owner of Löftadalens Folk High School.

== Sources ==
- Johansson, Jörgen (2004). Regionalisering och kommunal självstyrelse: halländska kommuner i en regional miljö [Regionalization and municipal self-government: Halland municipalities in a regional environment] (PDF) (in Swedish). Halmstad: Högskolan i Halmstad. ISBN 91-972579-8-2.
