= Gävle Hospital =

Hospital in Gävle, Sweden

- Region Gävleborg
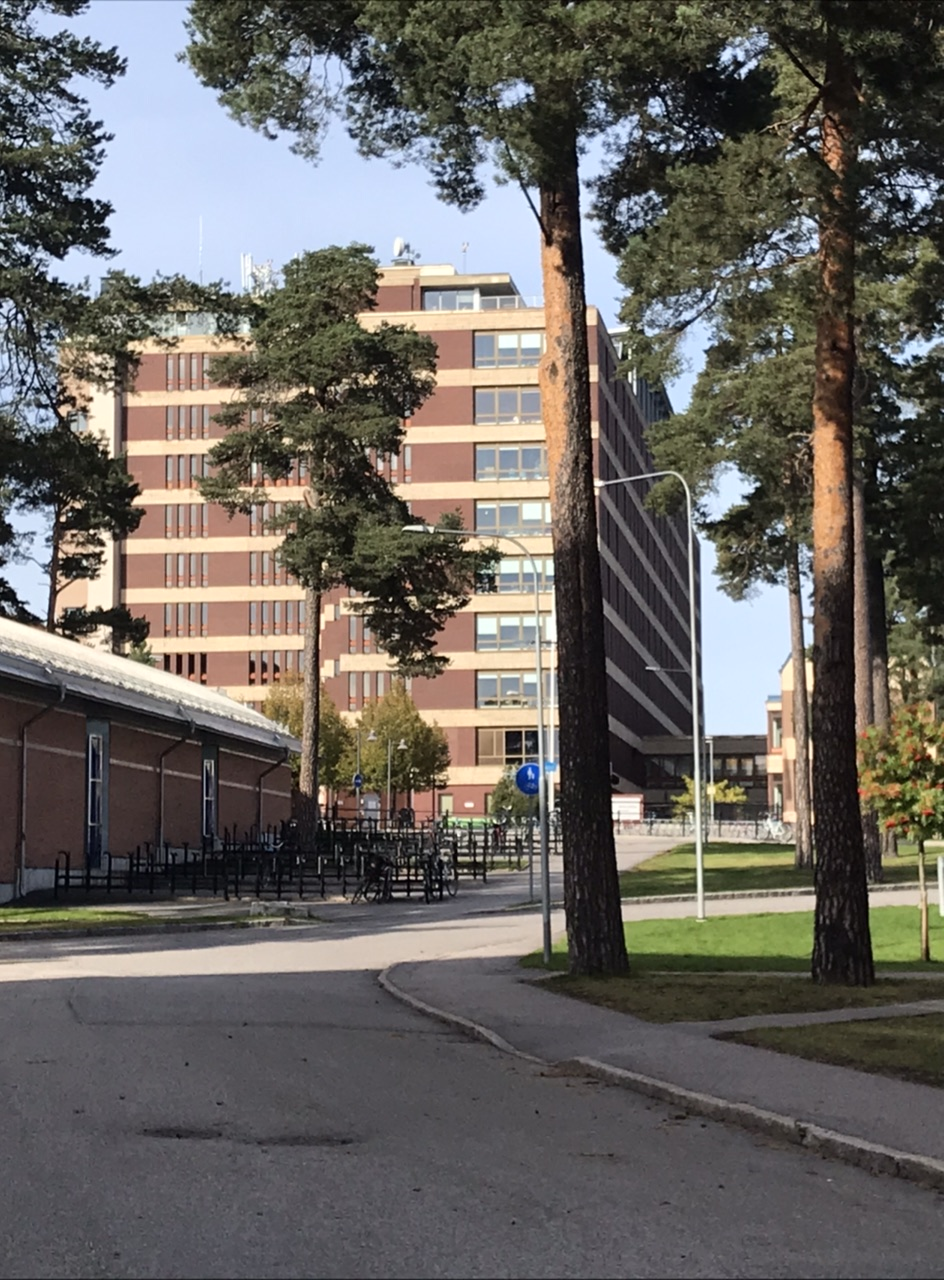
- Hospital exterior in 2019

Geography
- Location: Lasarettsvägen 1; Gävle, Sweden
- Coordinates: 60°40′41″N 17°7′10″E

Services
- Emergency department: Yes

Helipads
- Helipad: Yes (ICAO: ESJA)

History
- Opened: 12 November 1887; 138 years ago

Gävle Hospital (Swedish: Gävle sjukhus) is a public hospital in Gävle, Sweden, one of six located in Gävleborg County. Managed by Region Gävleborg, it has approximately 300 beds and operates the county's largest emergency department. There is also a heliport used exclusively for ambulance and rescue flights. Gävle Hospital also has an intensive care unit, maternity ward, paediatric clinic, and various other specialised departments.

The hospital was designed by architect Axel Kumlien and inaugurated in 1887. Considered state of the art for the era, it was equipped with modern amenities like central heating, flush toilets, and electric lights. Gävle Hospital was later the site first population-based mammogram breast cancer screening programme, led by physician Bengt Lundgren in 1974. Over the years, the hospital has undergone multiple renovations and expansions. It was named the fifth-best medium-sized hospital in Sweden by Dagens Medicin for 2016 and recognised for diabetes care in 2022. However, it has also faced scrutiny regarding workplace and patient safety.

== History ==
=== Background and founding (1767–1887) ===
Formalised healthcare in Gävle dates back to 1767, when the first city's hospital opened in the neighbourhood of Öster. It was also Sweden's fourth hospital and the first to be opened in Norrland. After this initial hospital and a replacement in Stadsträdgården were outgrown, plans were developed for a new hospital in the 1880s. Hospital architect Axel Kumlien was sent to Gävle to inspect the six location proposals. He favoured the site in Karlsborg, where an inn was already located, because of its relatively high elevation and closeness to both water and green spaces. Proximity to a nearby railway station, approximately 2 km (1.2 mi), was also deemed advantageous. Although several other medical officials preferred a site close to the present-day Gävle Concert Hall, the National Swedish Board of Health approved Kumlien's proposal for Karlsborg; Gävle Hospital was built there on donated land at a cost of 403,300 SEK and inaugurated on 12 November 1887. With space for approximately 120 beds, the new hospital was considered quite modern; it was equipped with central heating, flush toilets, and electric lights. The grounds also included a lunatic asylum, morgue, and a physician's residence.

=== Early years and epidemics (1888–1949) ===
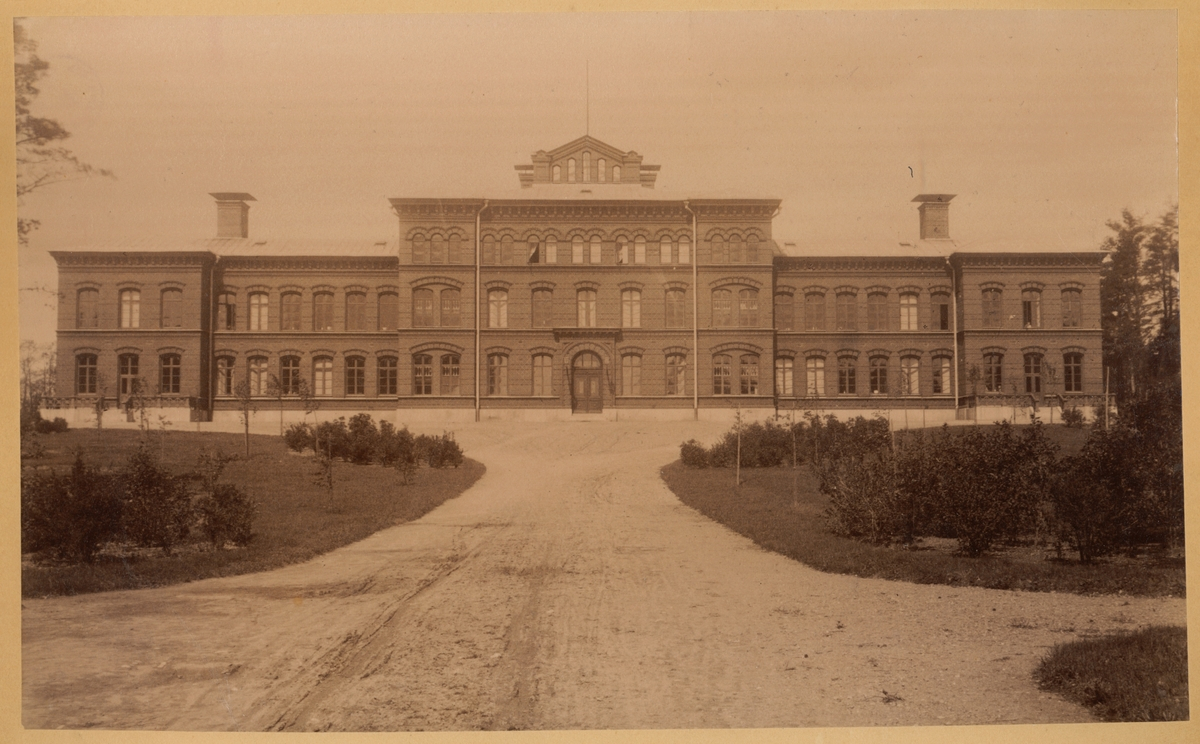
Gävle Hospital c. 1890–1892

In 1896, a so-called "epidemic pavilion" was built, to isolate patients with diseases such as Spanish flu and tuberculosis. It also had a floor for the treatment of sexually transmitted diseases like syphilis and gonorrhoea. In 1918, the County Administrative Board introduced a ban on entertainment events such as dances and plays, in response to the Spanish flu. Eight patients were said to have died of the disease at Gävle Hospital as of 2 November. In 1934, Dagens Nyheter reported that the hospital's epidemic facility was nearly full with scarlet fever patients, with 66 daily cases, and they considering requisitioning additional space in a local gymnasium. The following year, the hospital's catchment area was designated as all of Gävleborg County. A 300,000 SEK donation from Johan Westergren's widow Lotten allowed for the construction of a children's hospital on the grounds, which opened in 1948.

=== Continued operation and growth (1950–1999) ===
In the decades that followed, the hospital underwent several expansions and renovations. In the 1950s, a central kitchen and autopsy building were added. The 1960s saw the construction of a psychiatric clinic. Gävle Hospital was the site of the first population study using single-view mammograms to screen for breast cancer. The programme, which involved only one image of each breast, was developed and led by physician Bengt Lundgren. In addition to scans at the hospital itself, a mobile unit was developed to allow greater access for women in more sparsely populated areas of the county. 73,000 women over the age of 40 were screened through the programme between April 1974 and February 1979, with 320 cases of breast cancer identified.

A fire broke out at the hospital on the evening of 27 November 1974, causing five patients to require treatment for smoke inhalation. An evaluation the following year found the fire protection to be lacking despite recent renovations, and that the hospital lacked a formal plan for evacuation. A man who was working as a janitor at the hospital later confessed to setting that fire, among others. On 13 February 1975, a plane carrying members of the Västra Frölunda ice hockey team crashed on approach to Gävle–Sandviken Airport; doctors and nurses from Gävle Hospital responded directly to the scene by car before a helicopter transport was arranged. All eight people survived the crash, although the pilot and two players had to be admitted to the hospital for more extensive treatment.

On 6 May 1981, anaesthesiologists and radiologists at Gävle Hospital (alongside colleagues in Eskilstuna, Örebro, and Gothenburg) began a three-day walkout. The strike was organised by the Swedish Medical Association in response to a proposal by their employers that would have replaced traditional on-call system with regularly scheduled evening and night shifts. Emergency care was fully maintained but elective procedures were cancelled. In the mid-1980s, a three-storey underground facility was built under the hospital's emergency department. It was designed to withstand air raids during wartime. By 1996, the hospital had about 440 beds, spread across 14 departments.

=== Controversies, COVID-19, and renovations (2000–present) ===
In 2017, there were protests after management considered folding the stroke centre into the kidney and haematology departments. Due to nursing staff vacancies, the hospital reduced the number of beds in its surgical department from 22 to 12.

On 5 March 2020, the first COVID-19 patient confirmed in Gävleborg County was recorded at Gävle Hospital. By 12 March, Region Gävleborg announced a visitor ban with limited exceptions on all hospital wards in the county. Gävle Hospital opened its own testing laboratory later in the month, meaning samples would no longer need to be sent to the Karolinska or the Uppsala University Hospital. By April, the hospital was operating a separate emergency entrance for patients with COVID-19. During the course of the pandemic, the hospital experienced challenges with both infrastructure and staffing.

A nurse was convicted in November 2021 of raping several patients while he worked at Gävle Hospital. In December 2022, the Health and Social Care Inspectorate issued a report identifying "major deficiencies in care" there. In September 2024, a patient in psychiatric care attacked three staff members. Two were seriously injured. An inspection by the Swedish Work Environment Authority found the hospital's security system lacking. Two floors of the hospital had to be evacuated after a xylene leak on 18 March 2025. The gas alarm did not function as expected, prompting another Swedish Work Environment Authority investigation.

A ceremonial groundbreaking was held on 19 September 2023 to inaugurate a large construction project. The plans included a new helipad. On 6 May 2025, Region Gävleborg approved 1.1 billion SEK of funding for the hospital to improve its emergency, maternity, delivery, and neonatal facilities. Construction was expected to begin in May 2026. One of the new buildings features a 44 m (144 ft) relief of the Gavleån by artist David Svensson. In 2024 and 2025, the hospital was criticised by Gästrike räddningstjänst for alleged shortcomings with fire safety.

== Facilities and operations ==
It is one of six hospitals located in Gävleborg County, and is managed by Region Gävleborg. There are about 300 beds. Gävle Hospital operates the largest emergency department in Gävleborg County. The hospital is served by a licensed heliport (ICAO: ESJA), which is operated by Region Gävleborg, and used exclusively for ambulance and rescue flights. Gävle's maternity ward and intensive care unit had nine and six beds, respectively, as of December 2022. There is also a paediatric unit that treats children aged 0–17. The pathology department's adoption of a digital workflow was reported by Gefle Dagblad in 2018 to have reduced sample turnaround times, a change which could affect an estimated 17,000 patients referred to Gävle's pathology department each year. It has a unit for patients who have been sentenced to forensic psychiatry care. A centre for the treatment of eating disorders was established in 2004. It has one of three so-called "health squares" (Swedish: hälsotorg) in Gävleborg. The health square at Gävle Hospital provides health education and counselling, and operates support groups.

Besides medical care, the hospital also has other amenities. The hospital kitchen, updated in 2004, is used to prepare meals for patients, staff, and visitors. Gävle has both a playground and a hospital chapel. There is a library on-site, which allows patients and visitors to read newspapers and to borrow books, audiobooks, and films. The hospital has faced parking shortages for staff and visitors. An additional lot, with 340 spaces, was opened in October 2016. Bicycle parking is also available. Gävle Hospital is connected to Hudiksvall Hospital and Uppsala University Hospital by bus line #150, run by X-trafik.

== Recognition ==
It was named the fifth-best medium-sized hospital in Sweden by Dagens Medicin for 2016. Alongside Hudiksvall Hospital, Gävle received a top rating in 2022 for diabetes care.

== See also ==
- List of hospitals in Sweden
