= Gunnarsbosjön =

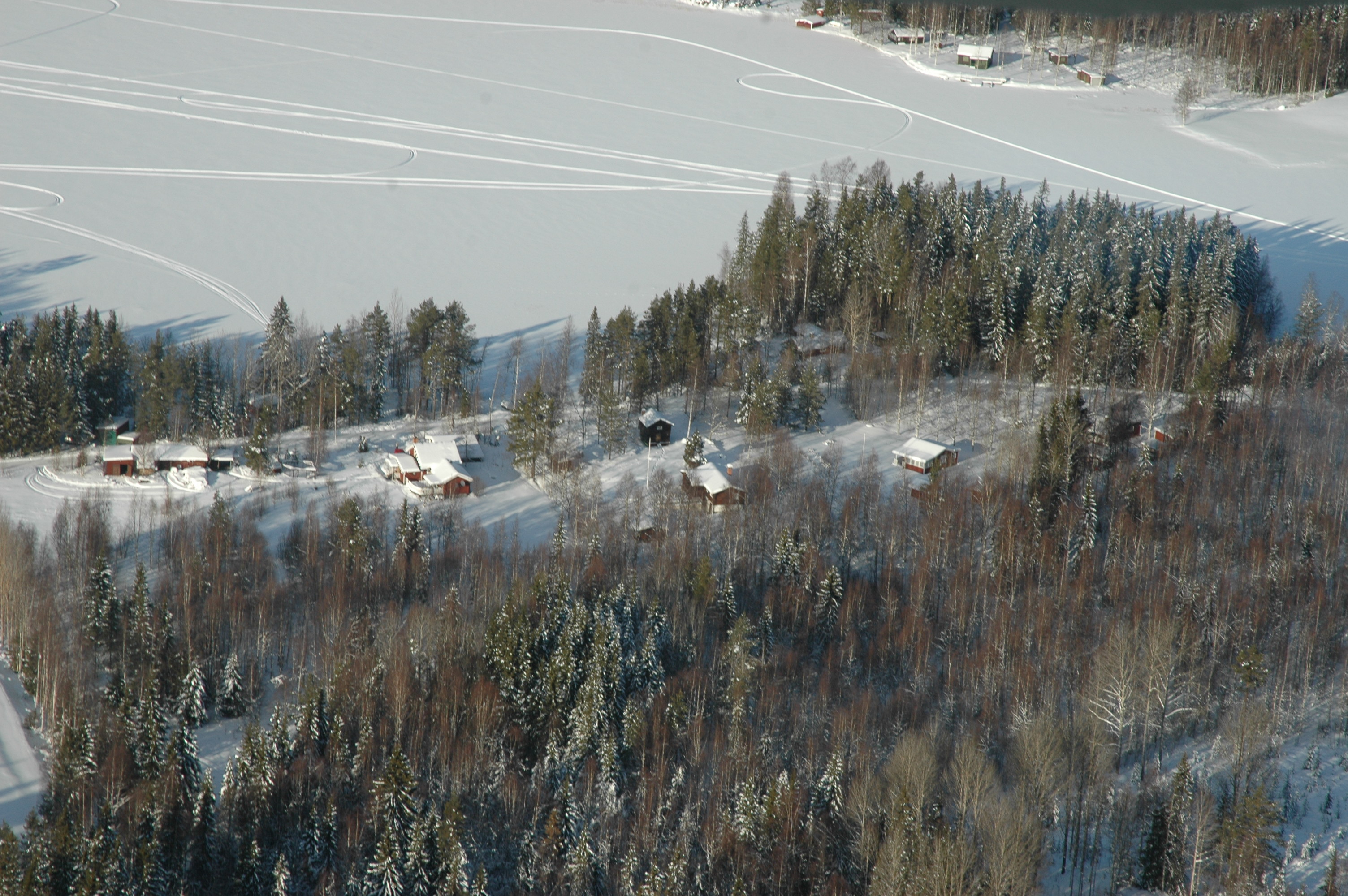

- Location within Sweden Gävleborg Location within Sweden
- Location: Gävleborg County, Sweden
- Coordinates: 61°52′0″N 16°17′0″E
- Type: Lake
- Surface area: 2 square kilometres (0.77 sq mi)

Gunnarsbosjön is a lake in Gävleborg County, Sweden, north of lake Gryttjen.
