= Gryttjen =

- Location within Sweden Gävleborg Location within Sweden
- Location: Gävleborg County, Sweden
- Coordinates: 61°48′0″N 16°17′0″E
- Type: lake

Gryttjen is a lake located to the northeast of Järvsö in Gävleborg County, Sweden. It lies along Highway 84. Near its south shore is an island named Tjuvholmen.
