= Västernorrland County =

County (län) of Sweden

Coordinates: 62°44′23″N 16°55′48″E

Västernorrland County Västernorrlands län (Swedish)
- County of Sweden
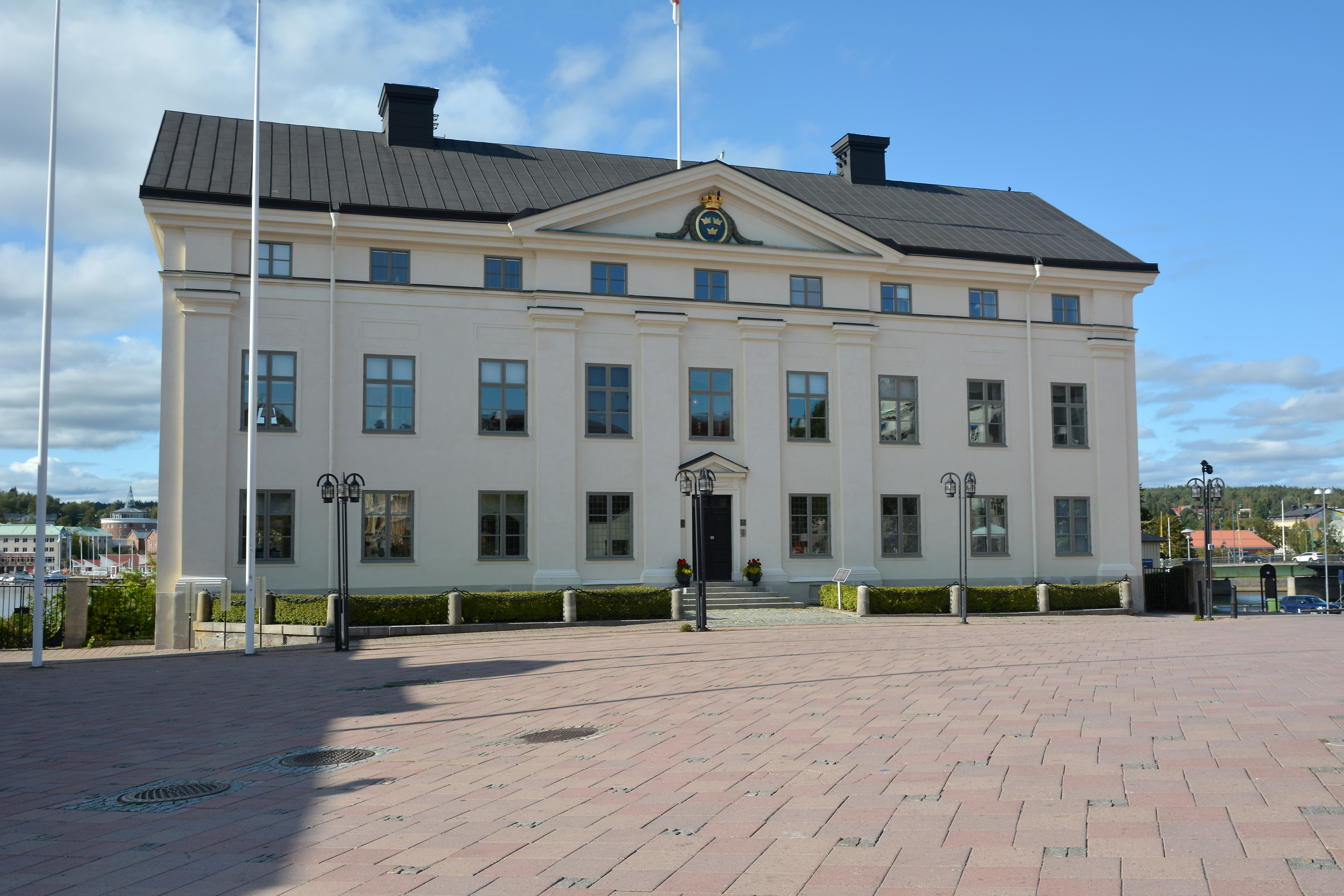
- The County Governor residence in Härnösand

- Flag Coat of arms

- Västernorrland County in Sweden

- Location map of Västernorrland County in Sweden
- Country: Sweden
- Founded: 1634
- Capital: Härnösand
- Largest city: Sundsvall
- Municipalities: 7: Ånge; Härnösand; Kramfors; Örnsköldsvik; Sollefteå; Sundsvall; Timrå

Government
  - Governor: Carin Jämtin (Social Democrats)
  - Council: Region Västernorrland

Area
  - Total: 21,683.8 km^{2} (8,372.2 sq mi)

Population (31 December 2023)
  - Total: 242,148
  - Density: 11.1672/km^{2} (28.9230/sq mi)

GDP
  - Total: SEK 91 billion €9.761 billion (2015)
- Time zone: UTC+1 (CET)
  - Summer (DST): UTC+2 (CEST)
- ISO 3166 code: SE-Y
- NUTS Region: SE321
- Website: www.y.lst.se

Västernorrland County (Swedish: Västernorrlands län, pronounced [ˈvɛstɛrˌnɔrlands ˈlɛːn]) is a county (län) in the north of Sweden, comprising the historical provinces of Ångermanland and Medelpad, as well as smaller parts of Jämtland and Hälsingland. It is bordered by the counties of Gävleborg, Jämtland, Västerbotten and the Gulf of Bothnia.

The name Västernorrland means "Western Norrland", as it was in the western part of the original Norrland (northern Sweden and northern Finland).

== Province ==
For History, Geography and Culture, see: Ångermanland or Medelpad

Västernorrland County covers approximately the historical provinces of Ångermanland (Angermannia) and Medelpad.

== Administration ==
The main aim of the county administrative board – a government agency headed by a governor – is to fulfil the goals set out in national politics by the Riksdag and the government, to coordinate the interests of the county, to promote the development of the county, to establish regional goals and safeguard the due process of law in the handling of each case. See List of Västernorrland governors.

== Politics ==
The regional council of Västernorrland is the Region Västernorrland.

== Riksdag elections ==
The table details all Riksdag election results of Västernorrland County since the unicameral era began in 1970. The blocs denote which party would support the Prime Minister or the lead opposition party towards the end of the elected parliament.

Year	Turnout	Votes	V	S	MP	C	L	KD	M	SD	NyD	Left	Right
1970	89.1	177,619	6.6	52.2		23.0	9.5	2.5	5.9			58.8	38.4
1973	92.1	178,788	6.3	50.7		27.7	5.6	2.4	6.7			57.0	40.1
1976	92.7	186,498	5.0	50.4		28.4	6.8	1.8	7.3			55.4	42.5
1979	92.0	185,794	5.4	51.2		23.6	6.5	1.8	10.8			56.6	40.9
1982	92.2	186,181	5.3	53.7	1.4	20.9	3.8	2.3	12.4			59.0	37.1
1985	90.5	183,019	5.4	53.2	1.3	17.6	10.0		12.2			58.6	39.8
1988	86.6	173,568	6.0	51.6	5.1	14.9	8.8	3.6	9.4			62.7	33.1
1991	86.8	173,566	5.1	47.9	3.1	11.3	7.3	7.1	13.0		4.7	53.0	38.7
1994	87.1	173,210	6.7	55.0	4.8	9.2	6.0	3.9	13.0		0.7	66.6	32.1
1998	81.6	157,892	14.8	45.1	4.1	6.6	3.6	10.2	13.7			64.0	34.1
2002	79.5	150,966	9.9	49.3	3.8	9.6	9.3	7.6	8.5	0.8		63.0	35.0
2006	81.5	153,417	6.7	46.0	3.8	10.6	5.4	5.7	17.2	2.2		56.5	38.8
2010	84.6	159,975	6.0	44.0	5.5	7.0	5.2	4.4	21.6	4.5		55.5	38.1
2014	86.1	162,112	5.7	46.3	4.4	6.7	3.4	3.8	15.9	10.8		56.3	29.8
2018	87.8	163,001	8.2	39.8	2.7	9.9	3.4	5.4	13.7	15.6		60.5	38.1
2022	85.2	160,500	5.8	39.4	3.4	7.5	2.7	5.4	14.0	20.1		56.1	42.2

== Municipalities ==
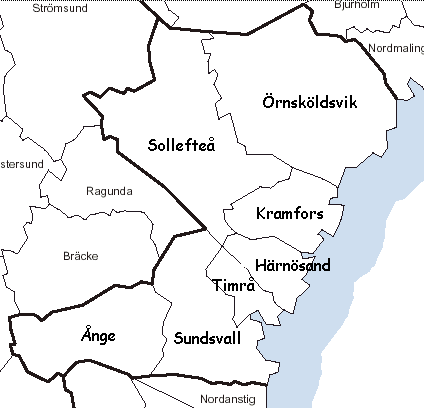
Municipal location map

In Medelpad Province:

- Sundsvall
- Timrå
- Ånge

In Ångermanland Province:

- Härnösand
- Kramfors
- Sollefteå
- Örnsköldsvik

== Demographics ==
=== Foreign background ===
SCB have collected statistics on backgrounds of residents since 2002. These tables consist of all who have two foreign-born parents or are born abroad themselves. The chart lists election years and the last year on record alone.

Location	2002	2006	2010	2014	2018	2019
Härnösand	5.9	7.7	9.1	12.7	17.4	17.7
Kramfors	5.3	6.5	8.2	11.1	15.3	15.8
Sollefteå	5.0	6.1	7.9	11.1	14.9	14.2
Sundsvall	7.4	8.4	10.1	11.9	13.9	14.4
Timrå	6.4	7.8	9.5	11.0	12.2	12.2
Ånge	4.0	5.2	6.4	7.8	10.0	9.7
Örnsköldsvik	5.0	6.0	7.2	8.3	11.1	11.5
Total	6.1	7.3	8.8	10.8	13.5	13.9
Source: SCB

== History ==
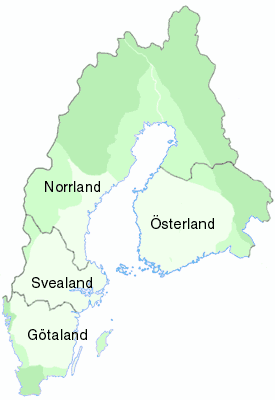
Västernorrland was in the west of Norrland

Västernorrland County was formed in 1634, when counties were introduced, replacing the older provinces. Västernorrland then included parts of Sweden north of the city of Gävle, except Jämtland and Härjedalen – which belonged to Norway – and except Finland.

The county grew and shrank significantly since its creation. The boundary adjustments:

- Västerbotten County was separated in 1637.
- Jämtland and Härjedalen joined in 1657, but they both separated as Jämtland County in 1810.
- Gävleborg County separated in 1762.
- Other minor changes have taken place.

Even though the name Västernorrland literally means "Western Norrland", it is today situated on the eastern coast of Swedish Norrland. The "west" in its name (väster) arose due to the fact that, at the time, Norrland was a much larger region, including northern Finland as well. Västernorrland was therefore the part of Norrland that lay west of the Baltic Sea, which used to be a Swedish inland sea.

== Heraldry ==
The arms for the County of Västernorrland are a combination of those of Ångermanland and Medelpad. When it is shown with a royal crown, it represents the county administrative board. Blazon: "Parted per pale, the arms of Angermannia and the arms of Medelpad."

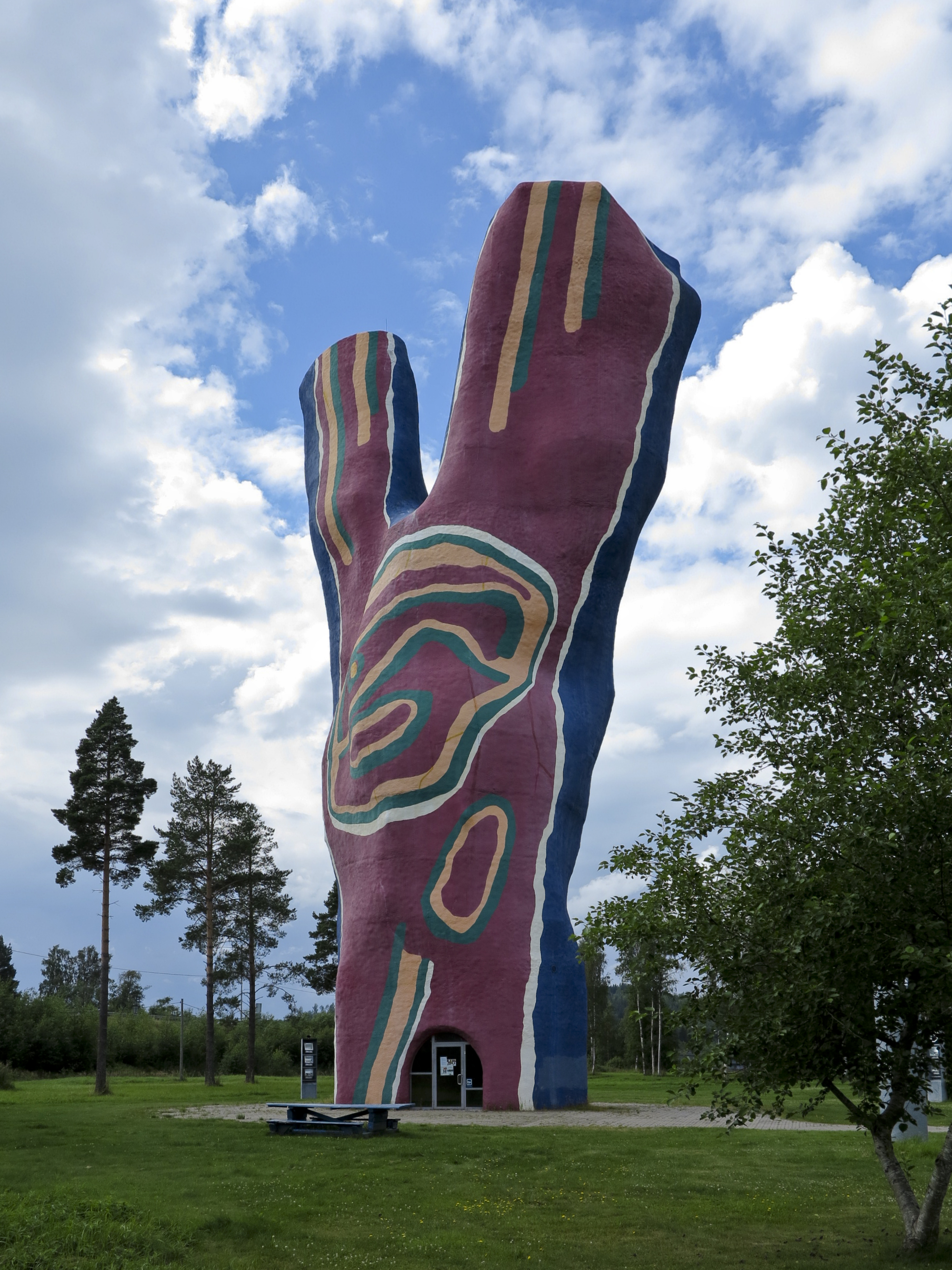
The county letter code for Västernorrland is Y, which is honored by a 30 meter tall sculpture by Bengt Lindström. It is located close to the Sundsvall–Timrå Airport, and was inaugurated in 1995.

== Miscellaneous topics ==
Local public transport in the county is provided by Din Tur.

== See also ==
- Rutberget, a 342m high mountain
- Västernorrland County Museum
