= Rutberget =

Mountain in Sweden

Coordinates: 63.36796°N 18.57100°E

Rutberget is a 342 meter high mountain north of Örnsköldsvik, Sweden.
