= Jönköping County =

County (län) of Sweden

Jönköping County Jönköpings län (Swedish)
- County of Sweden
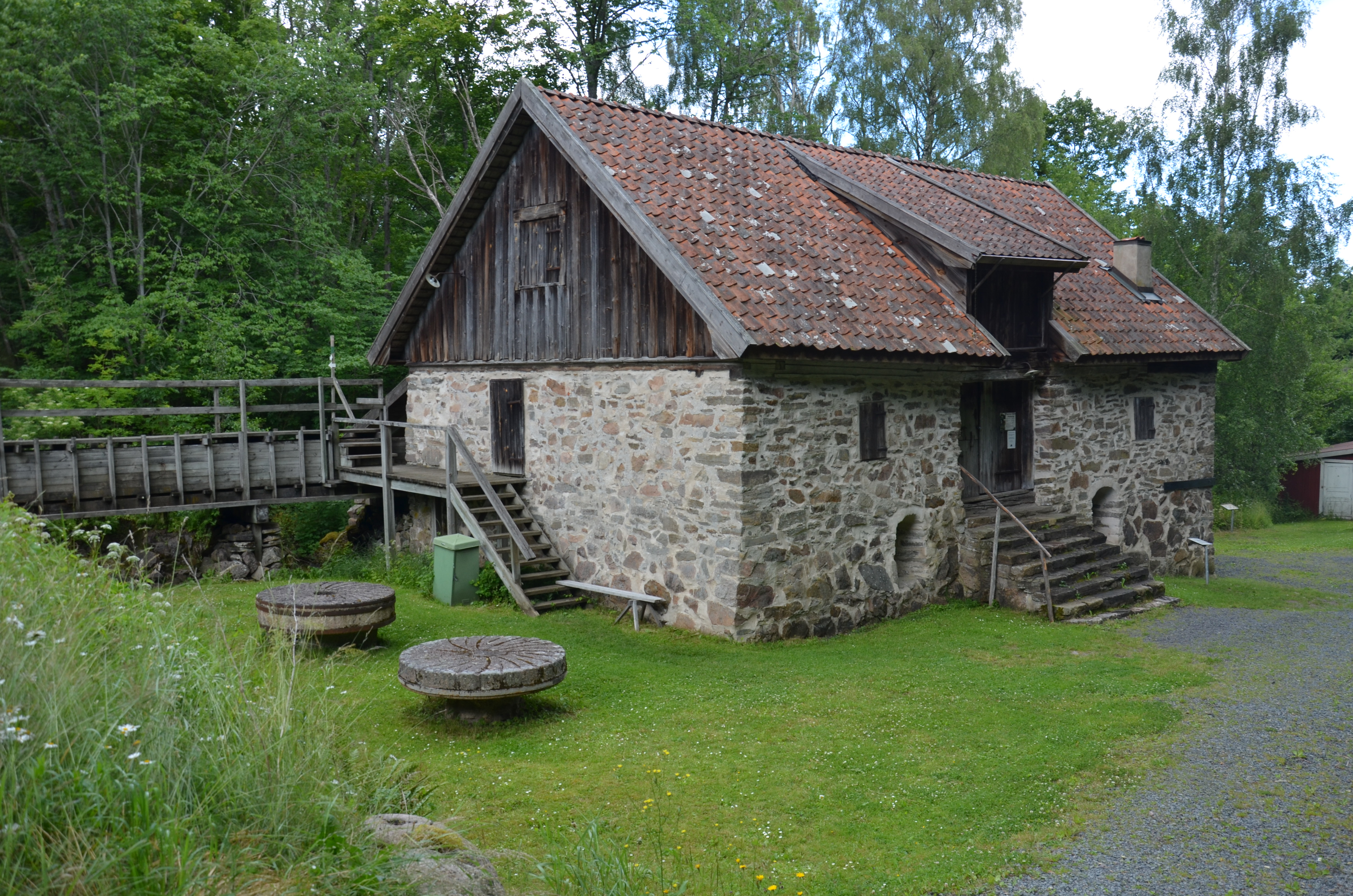

- Flag Coat of arms

- Jönköping County in Sweden

- Location map of Jönköping County in Sweden
- Coordinates: 57.75°N 14.2°E
- Country: Sweden
- Established: 1639
- Capital: Jönköping
- Municipalities: 13: Aneby; Eksjö; Gislaved; Gnosjö; Habo; Jönköping; Mullsjö; Nässjö; Sävsjö; Tranås; Vaggeryd; Värnamo; Vetlanda

Government
  - Governor: Brittis Benzler
  - Council: Region Jönköping County

Area
  - Total: 10,495.1 km^{2} (4,052.2 sq mi)

Population (31 December 2023)
  - Total: 368,856
  - Density: 35.1455/km^{2} (91.0265/sq mi)

GDP
  - Total: SEK 128 billion €13.709 billion (2015)
- Time zone: UTC+1 (CET)
  - Summer (DST): UTC+2 (CEST)
- ISO 3166 code: SE-F
- NUTS Region: SE211
- Website: www.f.lst.se

Jönköping County (Swedish: Jönköpings län, pronounced [ˈjœnːˌɕøːpɪŋs lɛːn]) is a county or län in southern Sweden. It borders the counties of Halland, Västra Götaland, Östergötland, Kalmar and Kronoberg. The total county population was 356,291 inhabitants in September 2017. The capital and largest city is Jönköping. About one quarter of the total county population lives in the combined Jönköping-Huskvarna urban area around the southern point of Lake Vättern.

== Provinces and administrative history ==
Despite being commonly used to indicate the geographical, cultural and historical region, the larger historical province (landskap) of Småland, which most of Jönköping County is part of, has no administrative or political significance today. Jönköping County has existed as an administrative division since the 17th century, and constitutes the north-western part of Småland, the other parts being Kronoberg County in the south-west and Kalmar County in the east. Jönköping County was periodically united with neighbouring Kronoberg County in the single Jönköping and Kronoberg County until 1687. Until the 18th century the administration was housed in the Renaissance fortress at Jönköping Castle, which was demolished in the 19th century; the former site of the castle is still the site of the County Administrative Board building and the Governor's residence.

Habo Municipality and Mullsjö Municipality, from the south-eastern part of the historical province of Västergötland, are since the dissolution of Skaraborg County in 1998 also part of Jönköping County; both municipalities joined Jönköping County as the results of local referendums in 1997.

== Administration ==
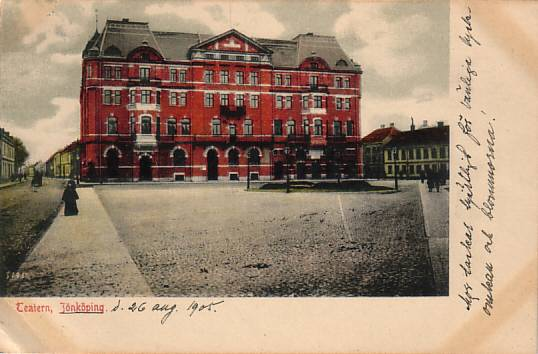
Jönköping Grand Hotel, one of city's oldest hotels, on a postcard from 1905

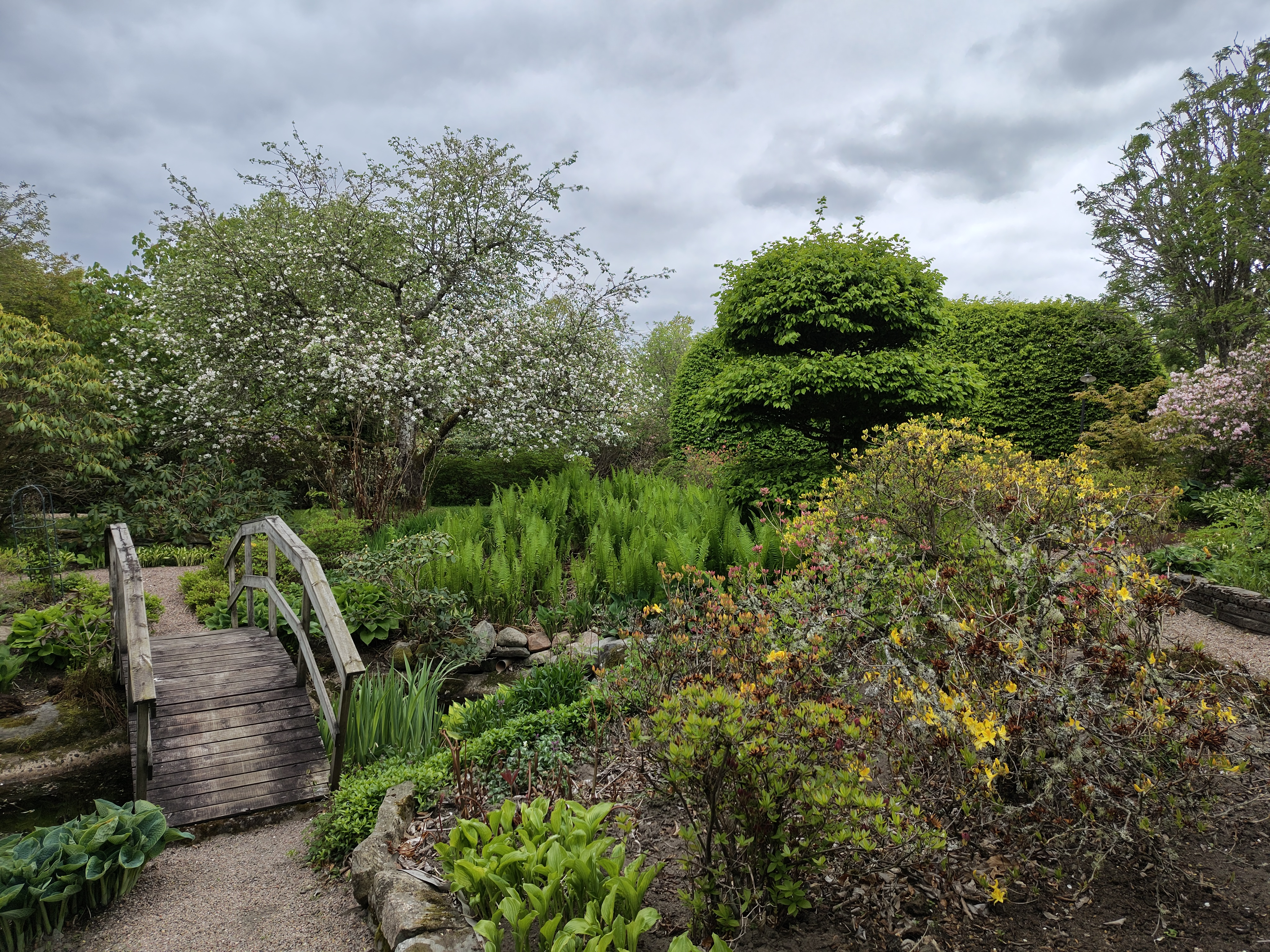
Kärrhults gård bothanical garden in Broaryd area

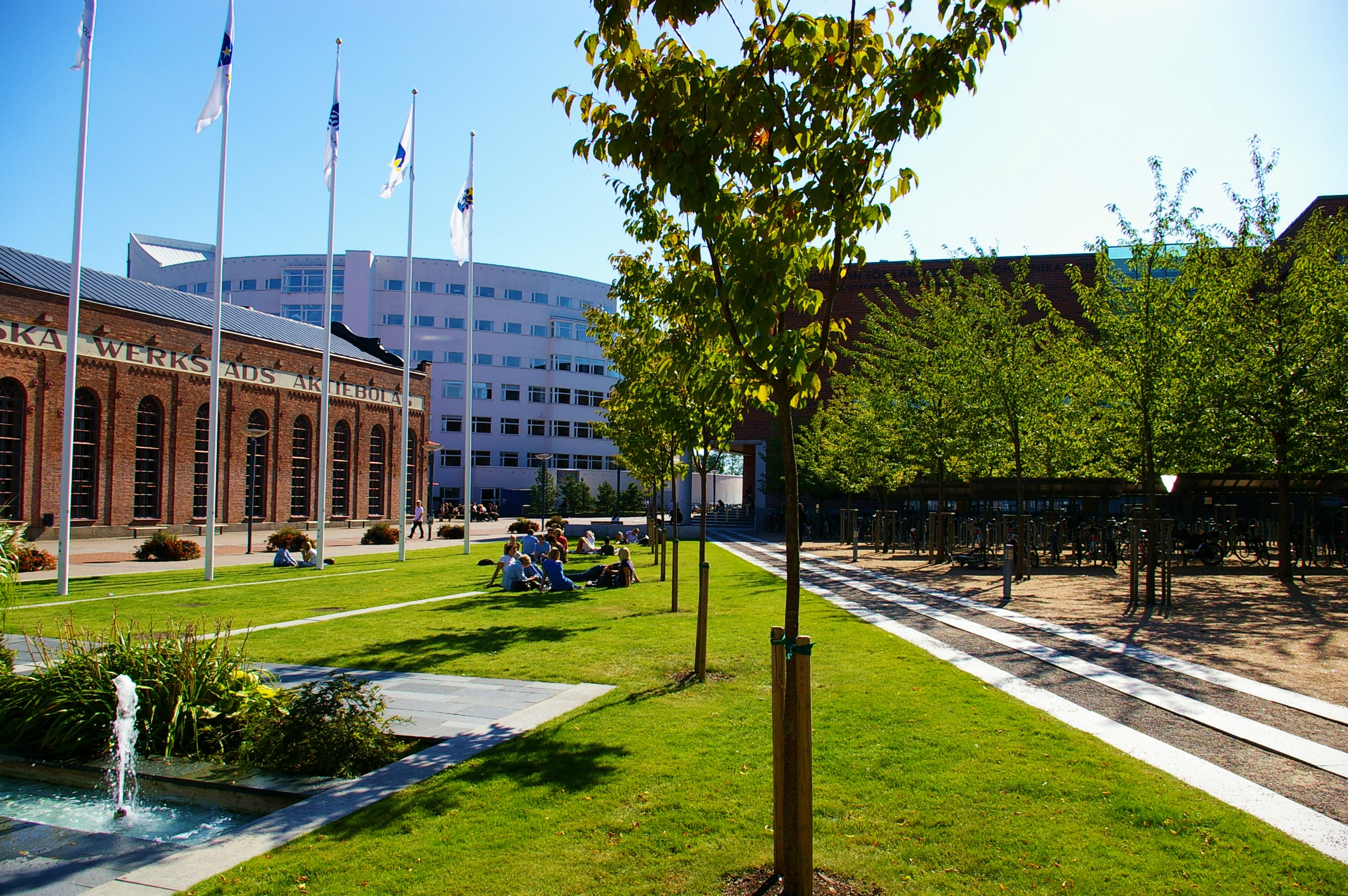
Part of the inner yard of Jönköping University

The main aim of the County Administrative Board is to fulfill the goals set in national politics by the Riksdag and the Government, to coordinate the interests and promote the development of the county, to establish regional goals and safeguard the due process of law in the handling of each case. The County Administrative Board is a Government Agency headed by a Governor. The seat of residence for the Governor or Landshövding is the city of Jönköping. See the list of Jönköping Governors.

== Politics ==
The main responsibilities of the County Council of Jönköping, or Landstinget i Jönköpings län, are the regional public healthcare system and public transport. The County Council Assembly (landstingsfullmäktige), which is the elected body for regional municipal issues, is elected every four years concurrently with the Riksdag elections.

The county's best-known parliamentary representative was the late Olof Palme, leader of the Swedish Social Democratic Party from 1969 to 1986, and twice Prime Minister of Sweden from 1969 to 1976 and from 1982 to 1986.

Jönköping County is the strongest electoral region of the Christian Democrats, who traditionally have a large following among members of evangelical churches in the region. The County Council Assembly and most of the municipalities in the county are governed by liberal-conservative, center-right coalitions. The Social Democrats have historically been strong in mill towns and industrial districts of Jönköping County.

In the 1922 prohibition referendum which would have banned the sale of alcohol in Sweden, Jönköping County at 81.5% had the strongest support for the ban.

=== Current representation in the Riksdag (2022–2026) ===
Seat	Name	Party	Notes
90	Carina Ödebrink	Social Democrats	
61	Johanna Haraldsson	Social Democrats	
183	Niklas Sigvardsson	Social Democrats	
182	Azra Muranovic	Social Democrats	
34	Jimmie Åkesson	Sweden Democrats	Party leader
120	Staffan Eklöf	Sweden Democrats	
121	Eric Westroth	Sweden Democrats	
60	Mats Green	Moderate Party	
10	Helena Bouveng	Moderate Party	
91	Acko Ankarberg Johansson	Christian Democrats	Serves as Minister for Health in the cabinet of Ulf Kristersson since 2022. Replaced by Camilla Rinaldo Miller.
33	Anders Karlsson	Centre Party	Replaced Annie Lööf on 20 February 2023.
150	Ciczie Weidby	Left Party	
151	Jakob Olofsgård	Liberals	

== Riksdag elections ==
The table details all Riksdag election results of Jönköping County since the unicameral era began in 1970. The blocs denote which party would support the Prime Minister or the lead opposition party towards the end of the elected parliament.

Year	Turnout	Votes	V	S	MP	C	L	KD	M	SD	NyD	Left	Right
1970	90.6	192,625	2.8	38.9		25.4	15.6	4.7	12.4			41.7	53.5
1973	92.4	192,883	2.8	38.1		29.2	9.9	5.5	14.1			40.9	53.2
1976	93.2	202,653	2.5	36.4		30.4	11.5	3.6	15.4			38.9	57.2
1979	92.1	201,877	3.2	37.4		23.9	11.3	4.2	19.6			40.6	54.9
1982	92.6	204,335	3.0	40.1	1.1	19.7	6.7	6.8	22.5			43.1	48.9
1985	91.1	203,979	3.1	40.2	1.0	21.7	14.3		19.4			43.3	55.4
1988	87.9	197,555	3.4	40.0	3.8	14.5	11.2	10.6	16.2			47.1	41.9
1991	88.6	200,393	2.8	34.8	2.5	11.0	7.4	16.8	18.8		5.2	37.6	53.9
1994	88.3	200,764	4.4	41.8	4.2	10.8	6.2	10.7	19.9		1.0	50.3	47.6
1998	83.7	199,750	8.8	34.4	3.6	6.7	3.2	22.8	18.4			46.8	51.1
2002	82.1	198,982	5.7	39.5	3.2	7.3	9.0	20.3	12.7	1.0		48.5	49.3
2006	83.4	205,300	4.3	35.4	3.4	8.4	5.4	16.1	22.1	3.2		43.1	51.9
2010	85.5	216,564	4.1	30.6	5.3	7.8	5.6	12.9	26.7	6.4		40.0	53.0
2014	87.0	224,596	3.9	31.8	5.4	7.9	3.6	10.4	20.3	14.6		41.1	42.2
2018	88.1	229,580	4.9	27.8	3.2	10.1	4.0	12.0	17.7	19.3		46.0	52.8
2022	85.3	231,669	4.0	29.1	3.2	7.5	3.7	9.3	18.7	23.3		43.8	55.0

== Governor ==
The present Governor (landshövding) of Jönköping County is Brittis Benzler.

== Municipalities ==
Municipalities of Jönköping County.

1. Aneby
2. Eksjö
3. Gislaved
4. Gnosjö
5. Habo
6. Jönköping
7. Mullsjö
8. Nässjö
9. Sävsjö
10. Tranås
11. Vaggeryd
12. Vetlanda
13. Värnamo

== Localities in order of size ==
The ten most populous localities of Jönköping County in 2020:

#	Locality	Population
1	Jönköping	100,579
2	Värnamo	19,822
3	Nässjö	18,479
4	Tranås	14,789
5	Vetlanda	13,674
6	Eksjö	11,023
7	Gislaved	10,269
8	Bankeryd	8,838
9	Habo	8,753
10	Mullsjö	5,755

=== Foreign background ===
SCB have collected statistics on backgrounds of residents since 2002. These tables consist of all who have two foreign-born parents or are born abroad themselves. The chart lists election years and the last year on record alone.

Location	2002	2006	2010	2014	2018	2019
Aneby	6.3	7.4	9.3	11.2	15.3	15.6
Eksjö	6.9	8.1	9.6	12.3	18.3	18.5
Gislaved	20.5	21.3	23.0	24.9	31.1	32.0
Gnosjö	24.0	24.1	26.4	30.0	33.4	33.7
Habo	6.4	6.5	7.3	7.9	9.9	10.2
Jönköping	14.3	16.0	18.3	20.3	23.8	24.7
Mullsjö	8.9	8.7	9.8	10.5	13.0	13.2
Nässjö	8.8	10.6	13.5	18.1	23.9	24.5
Sävsjö	8.7	10.7	13.1	18.3	23.4	23.7
Tranås	8.8	9.6	11.6	13.9	19.1	19.8
Vaggeryd	13.8	15.8	17.2	18.5	21.5	22.4
Vetlanda	8.2	10.0	12.3	15.0	19.0	19.5
Värnamo	16.9	19.1	20.8	23.1	26.4	26.9
Total	13.1	14.5	16.6	19.0	23.1	23.8
Source: SCB

== Heraldry ==
Jönköping County was formally granted its arms in 1942. By custom it used a combination of the lesser state arms of Sweden and the arms for the town of Jönköping. Blazon for the town of Jönköping: "Gules, a Castle with three towers Argent massoned windowed and gated Sable issuant from a Base wavy Azure".

== See also ==
- Småland Runic Inscription 99
