= Region Västmanland =

Regional council of Västmanland County, Sweden

Coordinates: 59°37′09″N 16°34′51″E

- Regional Council
- Formation: 1863
- County: Västmanland County
- Country: Sweden
- Website: regionvastmanland.se

Legislative branch
- Legislature: Regional Council
- Assembly members: 77

Executive branch
- Headquarters: Västerås

Region Västmanland, known before 1 January 2017 as Västmanland County Council (Swedish: Västmanlands läns landsting), is the regional council of Västmanland County. The region is primarily responsible for healthcare, public transport, regional development, and cultural activities.

== History ==
Healthcare in Västmanland County dates back to 1765 when the Swedish government decided to organise hospitals on a county-wide basis. The first hospital in Västerås was established in 1766 and remained the only one in the county for a long time. County councils were formally established in 1862, with the first council meeting in Västmanland held on 14 September 1862, earlier than the official date to avoid clashing with the Västerås Market.

== Responsibilities ==
Region Västmanland is responsible for a range of public services in its administrative area, including healthcare, public transport, education, and culture.

=== Healthcare ===
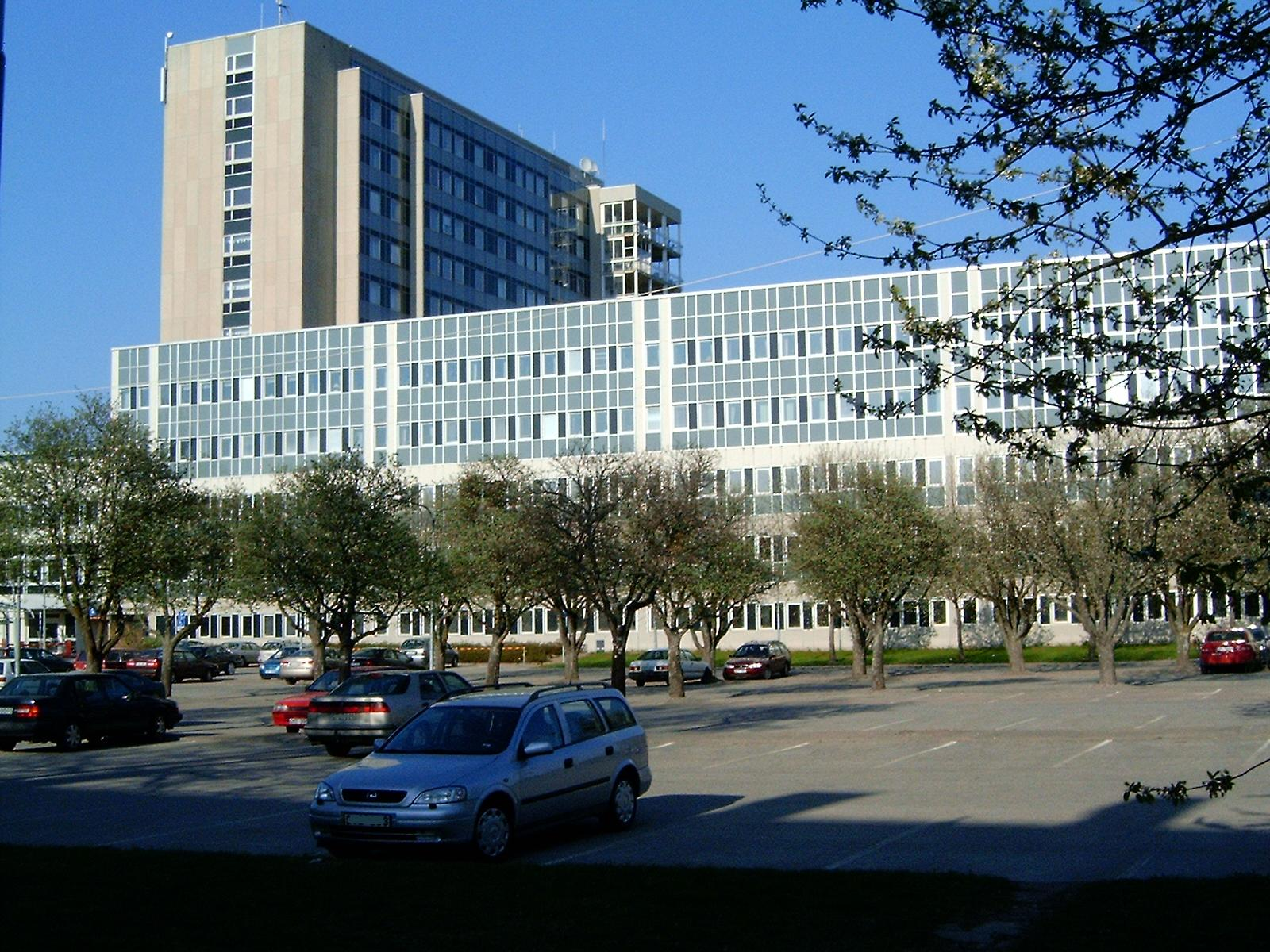
Västmanlands Hospital Västerås

Region Västmanland operates hospitals and healthcare centres across the county.

==== Hospitals ====
The region manages four hospitals:

- Västmanlands Hospital Fagersta
- Västmanlands Hospital Köping
- Västmanlands Hospital Sala
- Västmanlands Hospital Västerås

==== Healthcare divisions ====
Region Västmanland is divided into several administrative units:

- Primary Care, Psychiatry, and Disability Services (PPHV)
- Västmanlands Hospital
- Regional Administrative Services
- Folktandvården Västmanland AB (Public Dental Care)

==== Public and private health centres ====
Region Västmanland operates both publicly owned and privately run healthcare centres, where residents register for primary care services.

=== Public transport ===
On 1 January 2012, a new public transport law took effect, making Region Västmanland solely responsible for public transportation in the county. The VL brand represents public transportation managed by the region's public transport authority. The region also collaborates with other transport providers such as Svealandstrafiken, Tåg i Bergslagen, and Mälardalstrafik for regional and interregional services.

=== Education ===
Region Västmanland operates one folk high school, Tärna folkhögskola, and collaborates with universities, including Uppsala University, for clinical research and healthcare education.

=== Culture ===
Region Västmanland is responsible for cultural initiatives, including museums, theatres, and music institutions:

- Västmanlands länsmuseum (Västmanland County Museum)
- Västmanlandsmusiken (regional music institution)
- Västerås Sinfonietta
- Västmanlands Teater
- Västerås Concert Hall
- Bibliotek i Västmanland (Regional Library Network)

== Politics ==
Region Västmanland is governed by an elected regional council (regionfullmäktige) consisting of 77 members. The regional executive committee (regionstyrelsen) is responsible for executing decisions and preparing matters for the council.

=== Electoral districts ===
Västmanland County is divided into two electoral districts for regional elections:

- One covering Västerås Municipality and Sala Municipality
- One covering Norberg Municipality, Fagersta Municipality, Skinnskatteberg Municipality, Surahammar Municipality, Hallstahammar Municipality, Köping Municipality, Kungsör Municipality, and Arboga Municipality
