= Region Gävleborg =

Regional council of Gävleborg County, Sweden

- Regional Council
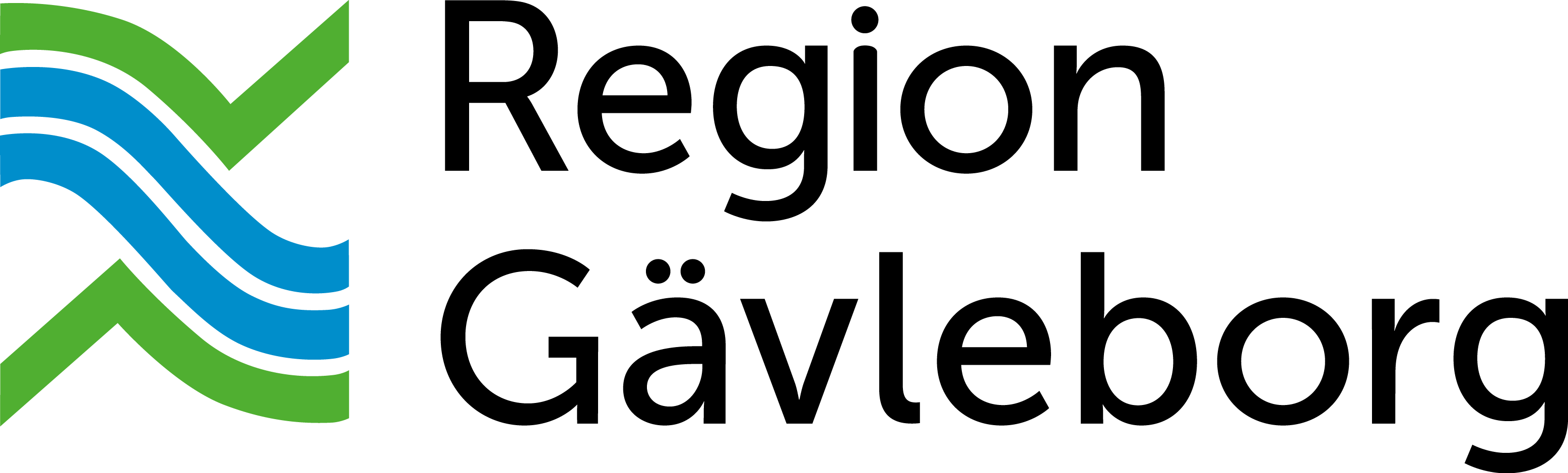
- Formation: 2015
- County: Gävleborg County
- Country: Sweden
- Website: www.regiongavleborg.se

Legislative branch
- Legislature: Regional Council
- Assembly members: 75

Executive branch
- Chairman of the Regional Executive Board: Patrik Stenvard
- First Deputy Chairman: Anna Sundberg
- Second Deputy Chairman: Eva Lindberg
- Headquarters: Gävle; 60°40′22″N 17°9′4″E

Region Gävleborg, formerly known as Gävleborg County Council (Swedish: Gävleborgs läns landsting), is the regional council for Gävleborg County, Sweden. The Region is primarily responsible for healthcare and public transport but also oversees regional development and culture.

Region Gävleborg is the Region for Gävleborg County in Sweden

== Conversion from County Council to Region ==
On 1 January 2015, Gävleborg County Council was restructured into Region Gävleborg. In addition to its traditional responsibilities such as healthcare, public transport agency X-Trafik, and cultural development, the Region now also manages infrastructure and economic growth initiatives.

== Responsibilities ==
=== Hospitals ===
- Gävle Hospital
- Hudiksvall Hospital
- Bollnäs Hospital
- Ljusdal Local Hospital
- Sandviken Local Hospital
- Söderhamn Local Hospital

=== Public Transport ===
X-Trafik is the public transport authority responsible for regional public transport in Gävleborg County, operating under Region Gävleborg.

=== Education ===
- Naturbruksgymnasiet Nytorp
- Naturbruksgymnasiet Ljusdal
- Bollnäs Folk High School (with branches in Gävle and Söderhamn)
- Forsa Folk High School
- Västerbergs Folk High School

=== Culture ===
- Gävleborg County Museum
- Hälsingland Museum

== Politics ==
Region Gävleborg is governed by the Regional Council, with the Regional Executive Board handling executive matters.
