= Region Dalarna =

Regional council of Dalarna County, Sweden

Coordinates: 60°36′36″N 15°38′12″E

- Regional Council
- Formation: 2019
- County: Dalarna County
- Country: Sweden
- Website: www.regiondalarna.se

Legislative branch
- Legislature: Regional Council
- Speaker: Jörgen Norén
- Deputy Speaker: Mikael Rosén
- Assembly members: 83

Executive branch
- Chairman of the Regional Executive Board: Elin Norén
- First Deputy Chairman: Sofia Jarl
- Second Deputy Chairman: Björn Ljungqvist
- Headquarters: Falun

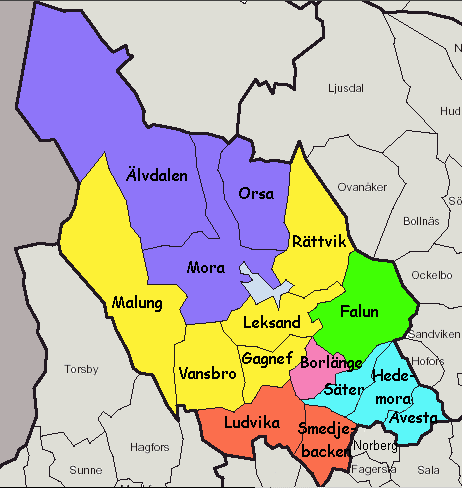
Electoral districts of Dalarna County for regional council elections

Region Dalarna, formerly known as Dalarna County Council (Swedish: Dalarnas läns landsting), is the regional council for Dalarna County, Sweden. The Region is primarily responsible for healthcare and public transport but also oversees regional development and culture. Historically it was also called Kopparberg County Council (Swedish: Kopparbergs läns landsting) (1863–1996).

== Conversion from County Council to Region ==
On 1 January 2019, Landstinget Dalarna was renamed Region Dalarna. In addition to its traditional responsibilities such as healthcare, public transport agency Dalatrafik, and culture, the Region now also manages some physical planning and infrastructure development within Dalarna County.

== Responsibilities ==
=== Hospitals ===
The central hospitals are located in Falun and Mora. Mora Hospital serves the northern and western parts of Dalarna, while Falu Hospital serves the eastern and southern parts. Smaller hospitals are located in Avesta, Ludvika, Borlänge, and Skönvik (Säter). The latter houses the county's forensic psychiatric clinic.

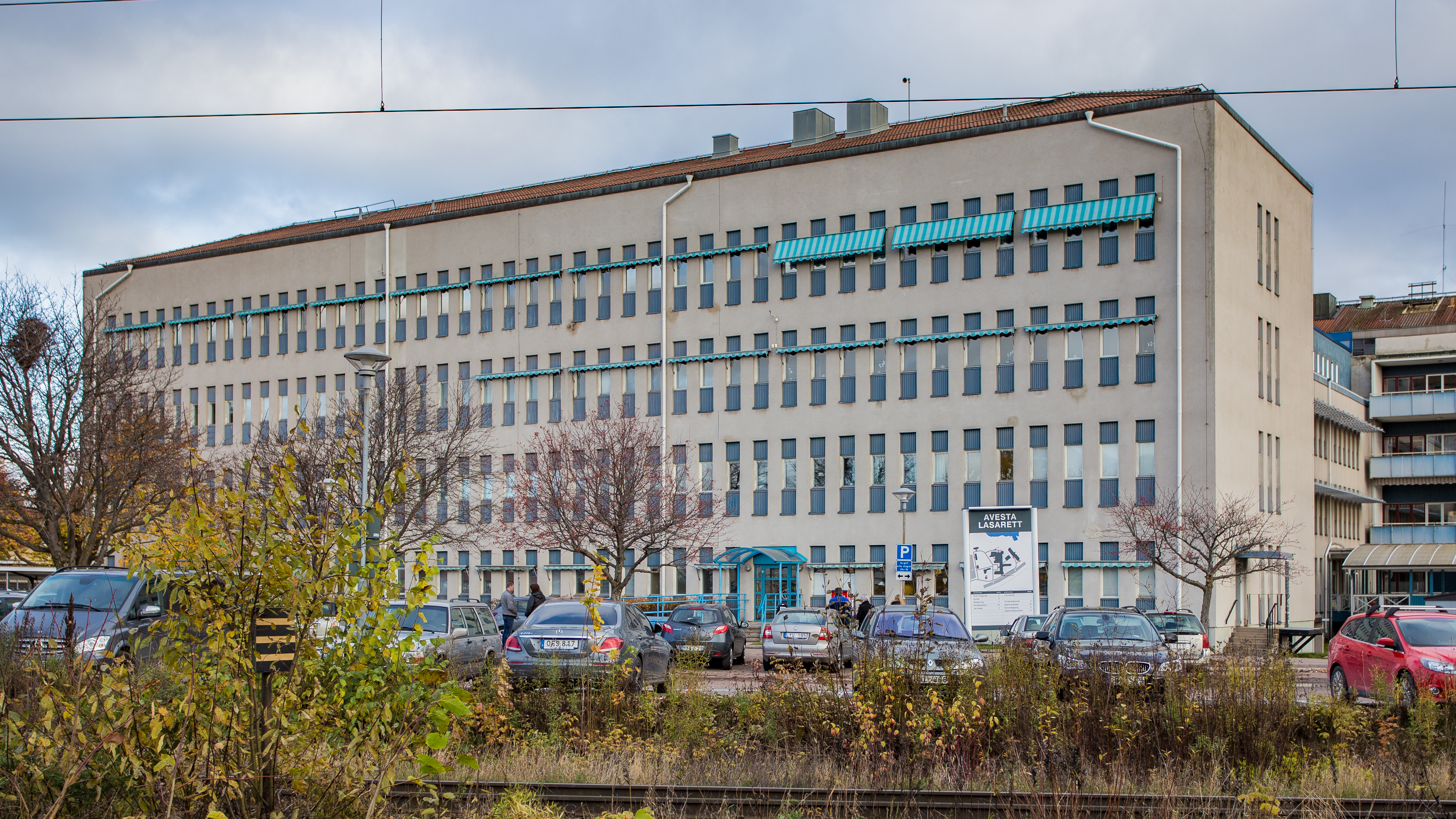
Avesta Hospital

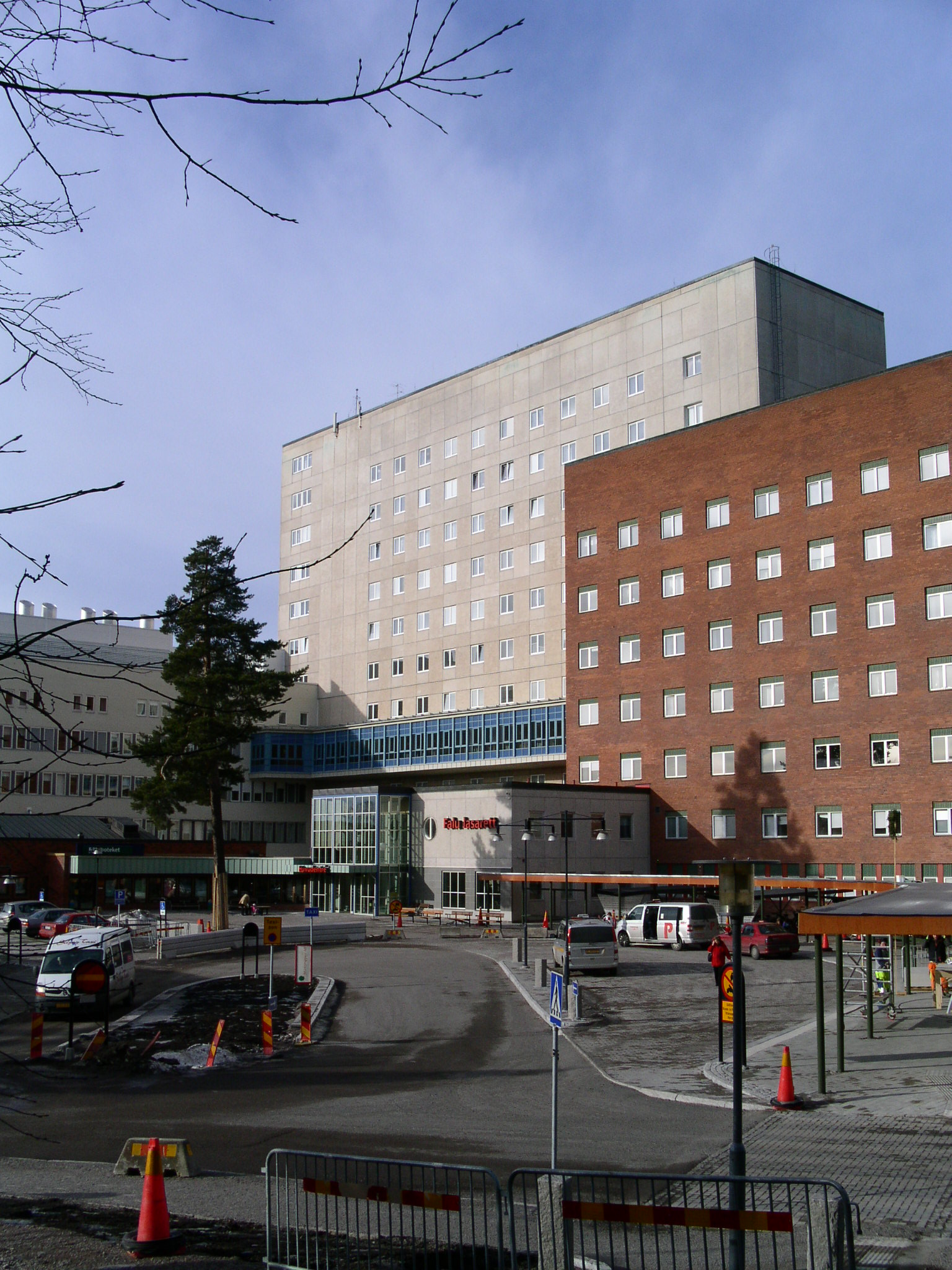
Falu Hospital

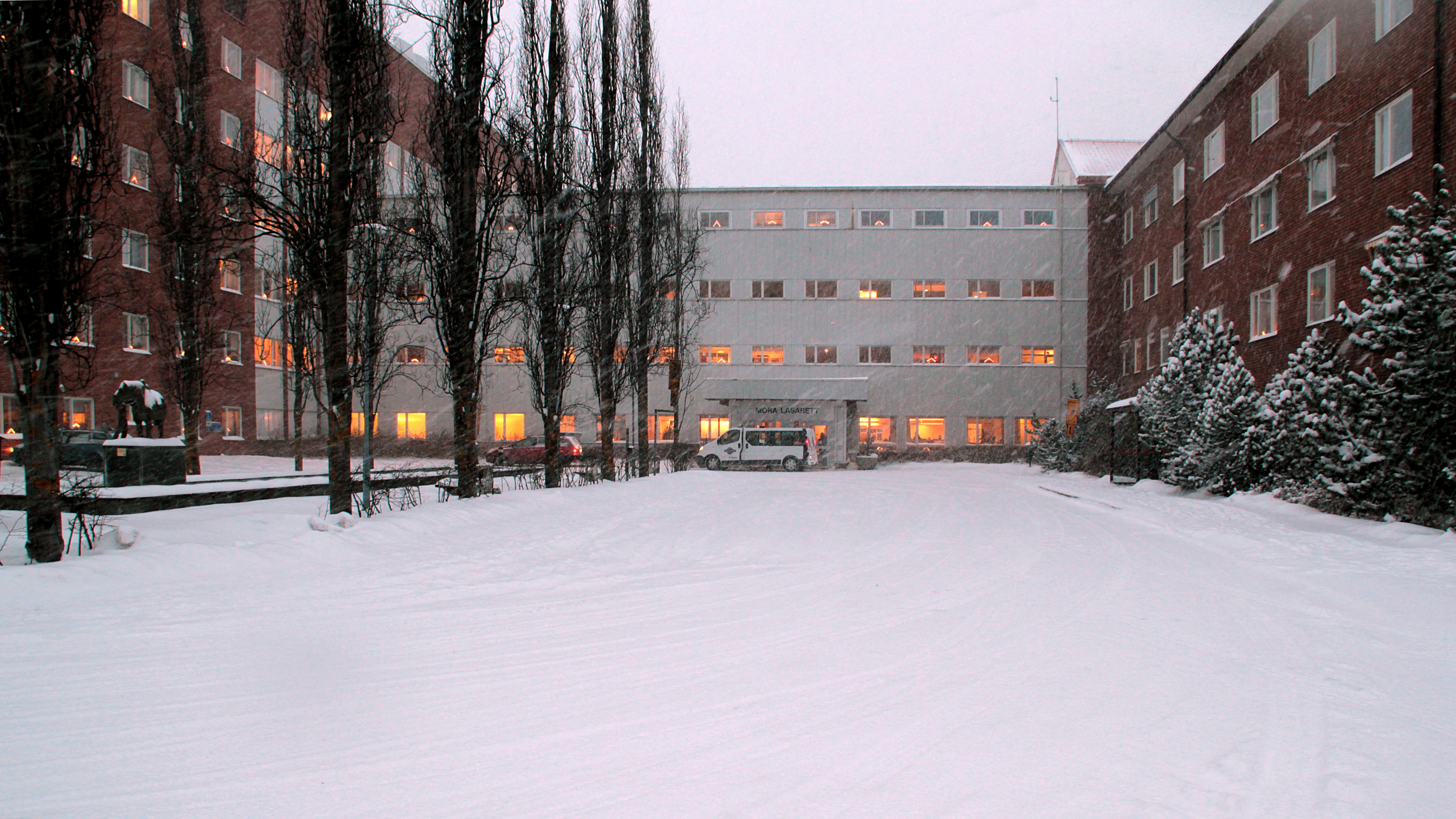
Mora Hospital

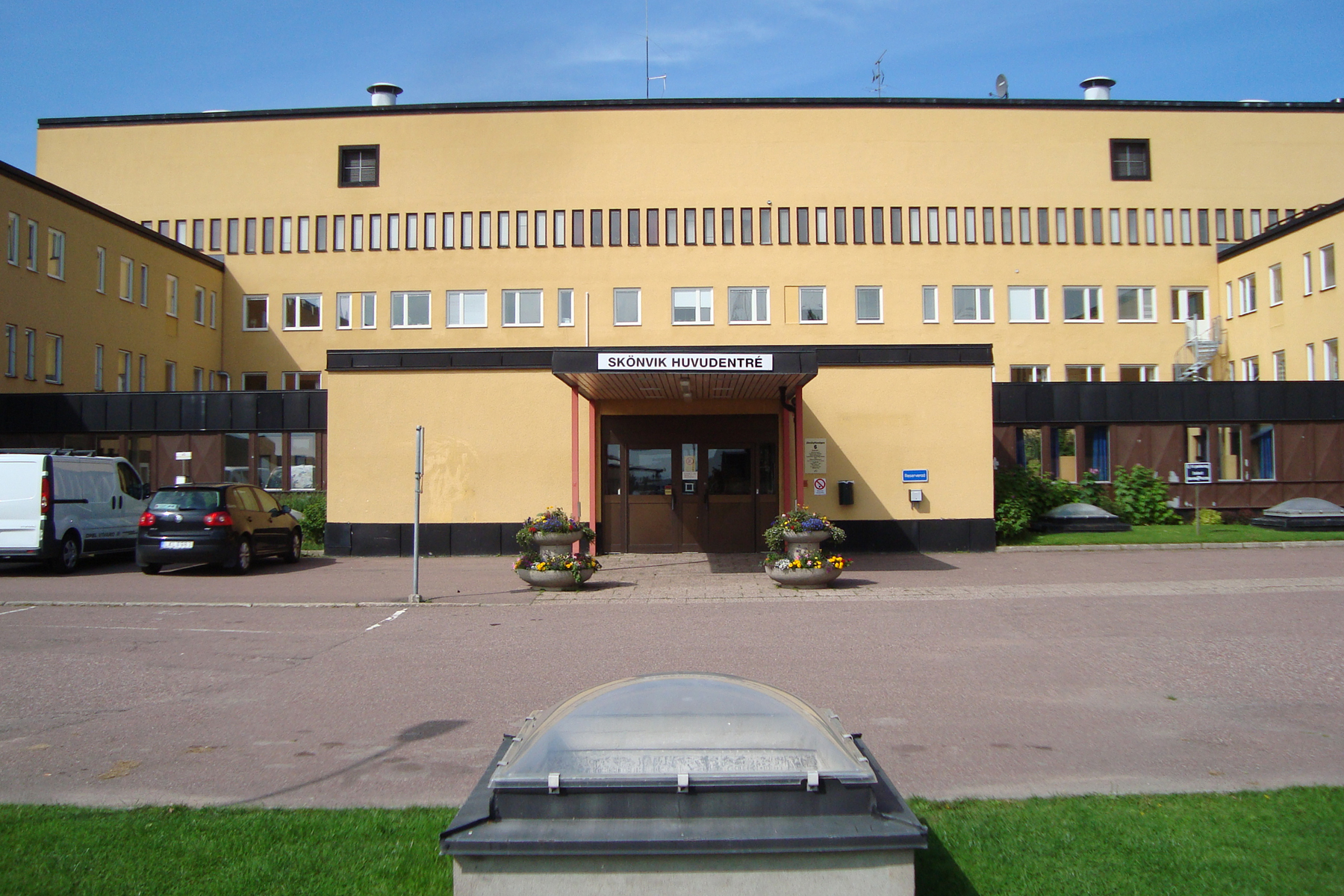
Säter Hospital with the Forensic Psychiatric Clinic in Säter

=== Public Transport ===
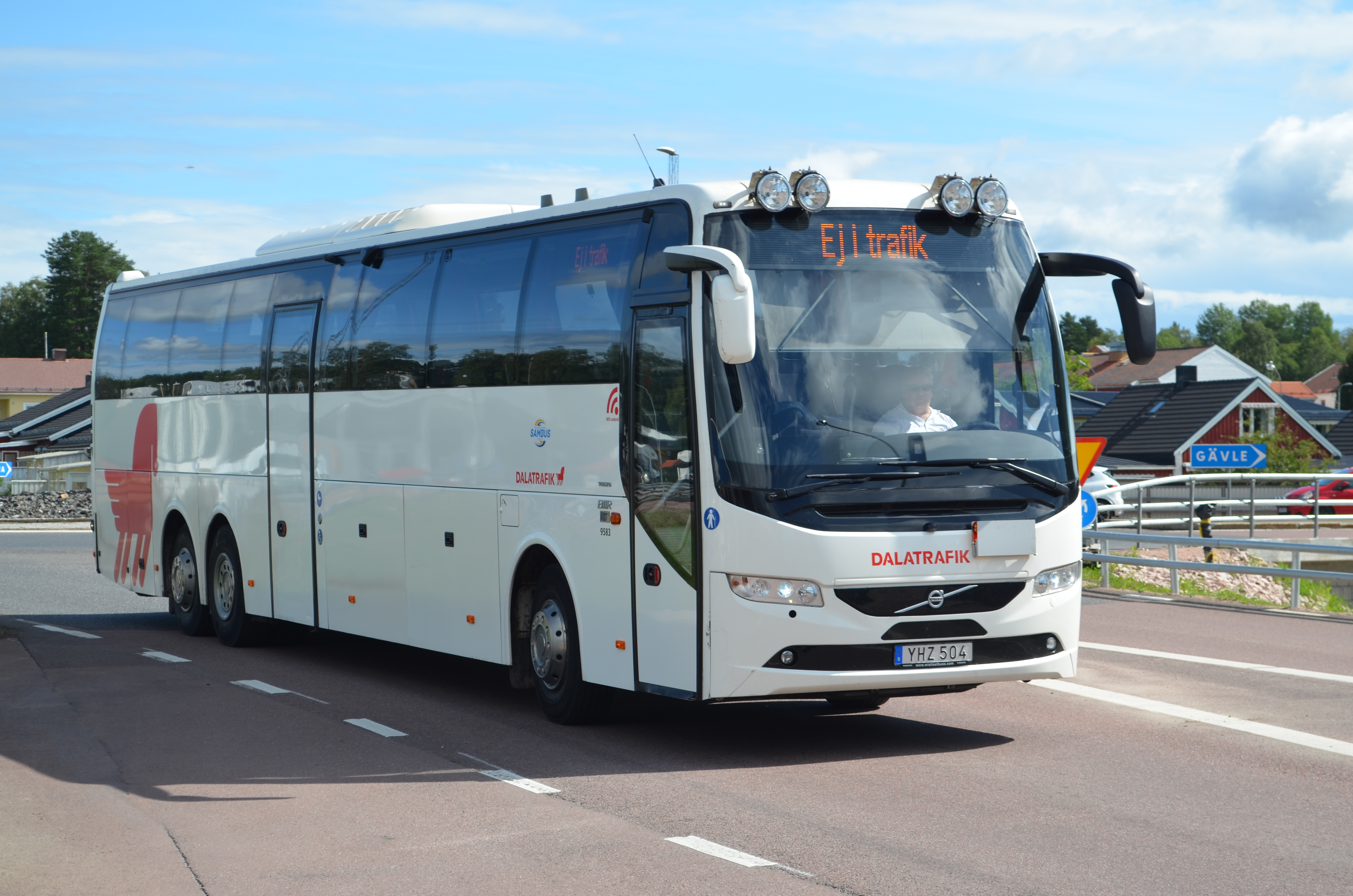
Dalatrafik bus

Dalatrafik is the public transport authority for regional public transport in Dalarna and operates as a division of Region Dalarna.

=== Education ===
- Dalarna University College in Falun and Borlänge
- Älvdalen Education Center
- The Natural Resource High School in Rättvik
- The Music Conservatory in Falun
- Fornby Folk High School in Borlänge
- Sjöviks Folk High School near Avesta
- Mora Folk High School
- Malung Folk High School

=== Culture ===
- Dalarna County Archives
- Dalarna Museum
- Dalarna County Library
- Dalateatern

== Politics ==
Region Dalarna is governed by the Regional Council, with the Regional Executive Board handling executive matters.

=== Chairman of the Regional Executive Board ===
List of Chairpersons
Name	From	To	Political Party
Alf Johansson	2002	2009	Social Democrats
Inga-Lill Persson	2009	2016	Social Democrats
Gunnar Barke	2016	2018	Social Democrats
Ulf Berg	2018	2022	Moderates
Elin Norén	2022		Social Democrats

=== Regional Council 2022–2026 ===
Chairperson		Vice Chairperson		Second Vice Chairperson	
S	Jörgen Norén	M	Mikael Rosén	KD	Torsten Larsson

=== Regional Executive Board 2022–2026 ===
Chairperson		First Vice Chairperson		Second Vice Chairperson	
S	Elin Norén	C	Sofia Jarl	M	Björn Ljungqvist

=== Majorities ===
Governing Coalitions
Term	Parties	Seats
1994–1998	Social Democrats, Centre Party	50 of 83
1998–2002	Social Democrats, Left Party	44 of 83
2002–2006	Social Democrats, Left Party (minority)	38 of 83
2006–2010	Social Democrats, Left Party	42 of 83
2010–2014	Social Democrats, Left Party, Green Party	42 of 83
2014–2018	Social Democrats, Left Party, Green Party (minority)	39 of 83
2018–2022	Moderates, Centre Party, Christian Democrats, Dalarna Healthcare Party, Green Party, Liberals	43 of 83
2022–2026	Social Democrats, Centre Party, Christian Democrats, Dalarna Healthcare Party	47 of 83

=== Municipalities ===
- Avesta Municipality
- Borlänge Municipality
- Falun Municipality
- Gagnef Municipality
- Hedemora Municipality
- Leksand Municipality
- Ludvika Municipality
- Malung-Sälen Municipality
- Mora Municipality
- Orsa Municipality
- Rättvik Municipality
- Smedjebacken Municipality
- Säter Municipality
- Vansbro Municipality
- Älvdalen Municipality
