= Region Västernorrland =

Council for Västernorrland County, Sweden

- Regional Council
- Formation: February 2018
- County: Västernorrland County
- Country: Sweden
- Website: www.rvn.se

Legislative branch
- Legislature: Regional Council
- Assembly members: 77

Executive branch
- Chairman of the Regional Executive Board: Sara Nylund
- Second Deputy Chairman: Robert Thunfors
- Headquarters: Härnösand

Region Västernorrland is the regional council for Västernorrland County, Sweden. Like all Swedish regions, Region Västernorrland is primarily responsible for healthcare, public transportation, and regional development. It also oversees cultural initiatives and public infrastructure.

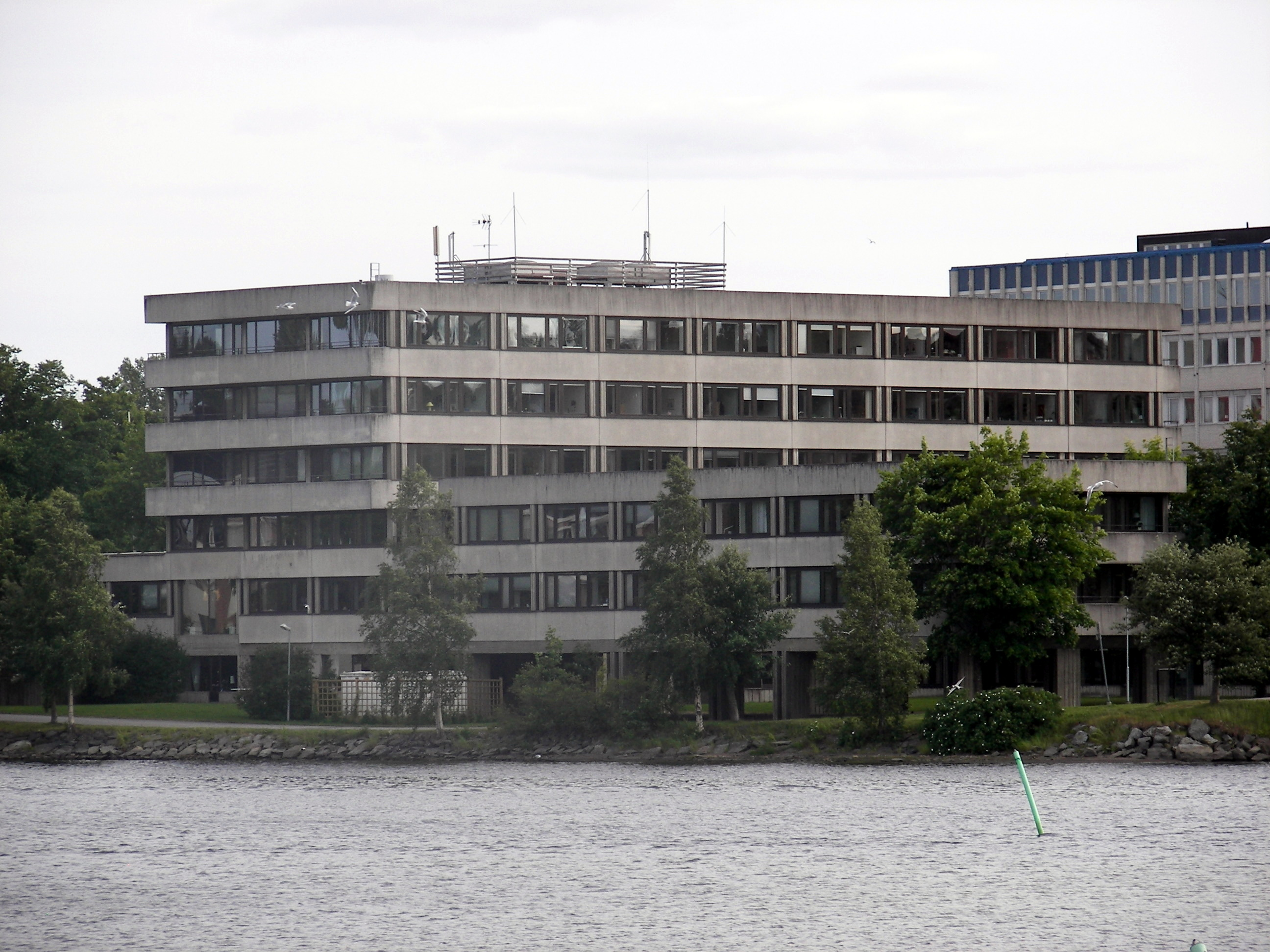
The regional headquarters in Härnösand.

== Hospitals ==
Region Västernorrland operates three hospitals in Västernorrland County:

- Länssjukhuset Sundsvall-Härnösand in Sundsvall and Härnösand
- Sollefteå Hospital in Sollefteå
- Örnsköldsvik Hospital in Örnsköldsvik

== Public Transport ==
Västernorrlands läns Trafik AB, the public transport authority of Västernorrland County is a municipal federation between the region and local municipalities, managing public transportation under the brand name Din Tur.

== Education ==
- Naturbruksgymnasiet Nordvik
- Skedom/Övergård Agricultural High School
- Räddningsgymnasiet Sandö (Rescue High School)
- Örnsköldsvik Folk High School
- Hola Folk High School
- Ålsta Folk High School

== Culture ==
- Västernorrland County Museum
- Scenkonst Västernorrland (60% owned by Region Västernorrland)
- Västernorrland County Library

== Politics & Organisation ==
On February 1, 2018, Landstinget Västernorrland officially changed its name to Region Västernorrland. The region is politically governed, with the Regional Council as the highest decision-making body. The Regional Executive Board has the main political responsibility and prepares matters for the council.

Between 2019 and October 2024, Glenn Nordlund (S) served as the Chairman of the Regional Executive Board. In October 2024, he was succeeded by Sara Nylund (S).

The Opposition Regional Councilor, who also serves as Second Deputy Chairman of the Regional Executive Board, is Robert Thunfors (previously SJVP, now an independent politician) as of 2023.

=== Electoral Districts ===
As of the 2018 regional election, the region has a single electoral district covering the entire county.
