= Region Jämtland Härjedalen =

Regional council of Jämtland County, Sweden

- Regional Council
- Formation: 2015
- County: Jämtland County
- Country: Sweden
- Website: www.regionjh.se

Legislative branch
- Legislature: Regional Council
- Assembly members: 55

Executive branch
- Headquarters: Östersund

Region Jämtland Härjedalen (Swedish: Region Jämtland Härjedalen, Southern Sami: Jïemhten Herjedaelien Dajve) formerly Jämtland County Council, and sometimes abbreviated to Region JH is the regional council for Jämtland County. The region is responsible for healthcare, dental care, and medical care. It also oversees regional development, public transport within the county, and cultural activities. The region was established on 1 January 2015 through the transformation of Jämtland County Council, and covers a population of around 130,000 people.

== History ==
=== Jämtland Landsjämnadting (1645–1862) ===
When Jämtland became Swedish after the Treaty of Brömsebro, parts of the responsibilities from the former Jamtamot were transferred to a Swedish county council. The Landsjämnadting managed regional matters such as communications and healthcare. It convened on Frösön under the decision of the county governor.

=== Jämtland County Council (1863–2014) ===
The budget decision of 1862 laid the foundation for the newly established Jämtland County Council in 1863, with representatives from Härjedalen included. In 1864, the county council also encompassed Ytterhogdal in Hälsingland, and from the 1970s, Tåsjö, Bodum, and Fjällsjö in Ångermanland.

=== Region Jämtland Härjedalen (2015–present) ===
On 1 January 2015 Jämtland County Council was transformed into Region Jämtland Härjedalen.

== Operations ==
=== Hospitals ===
The region manages one hospital, Östersund Hospital, located in central Östersund. The hospital serves a population of 128,000, which can double during the tourist season. Approximately 2,500 people work at the hospital, which has 416 beds.

=== Public transport ===
Region Jämtland Härjedalen serves as the regional public transport authority for the county. Länstrafiken i Jämtland and Norrtåg operate transport services under the authority's mandate.

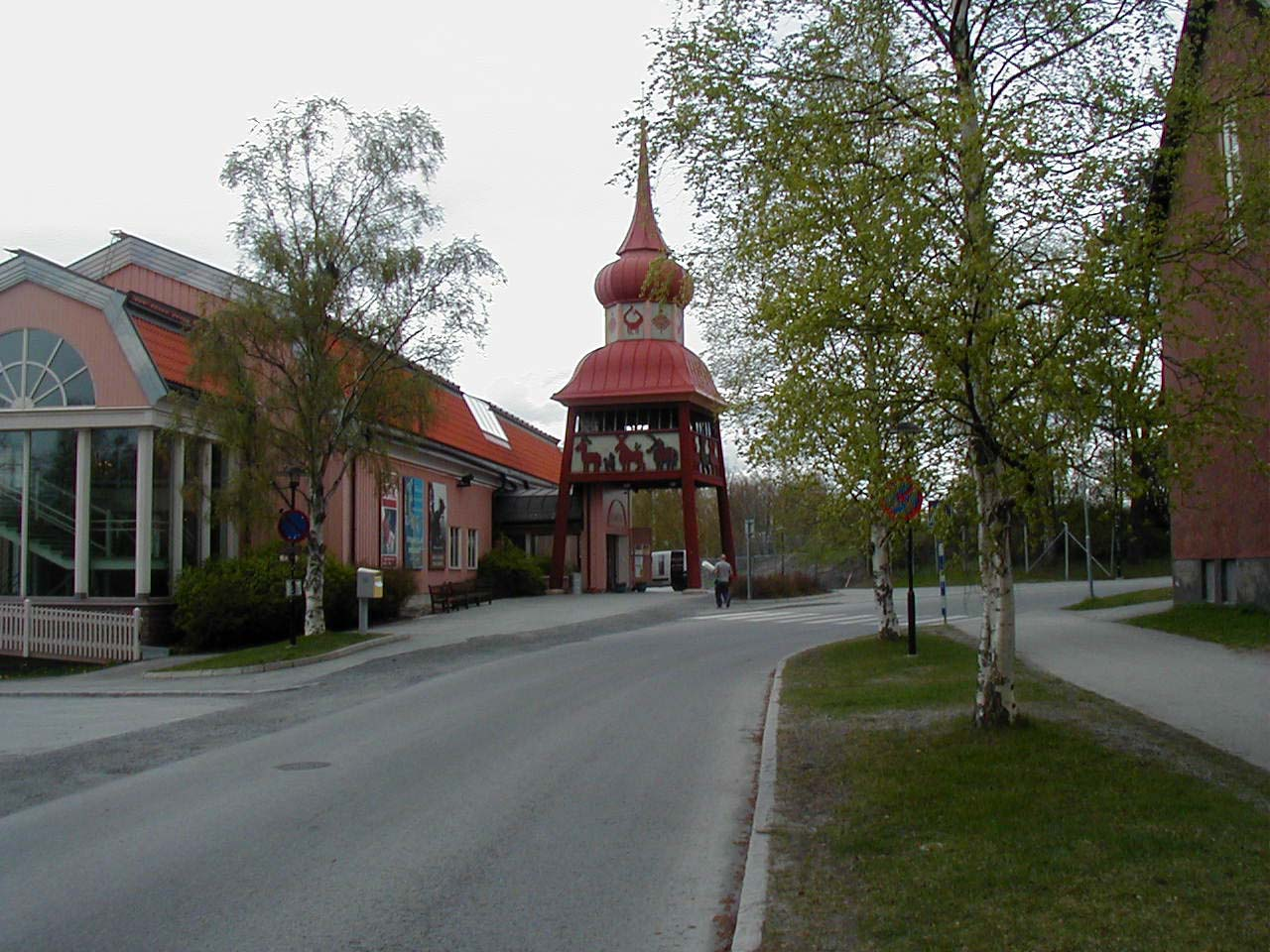
Entrance to Jamtli

=== Education ===
- Birka Folk High School
- Bäckedals Folk High School
- Åsbygdens Natural Resource High School

=== Culture ===
- Jamtli – The Jämtland county museum

== Organization ==
Region Jämtland Härjedalen is politically governed, with the Regional Council as the highest decision-making body. The Regional Board is responsible for executive matters and prepares issues for the Regional Council.

=== Electoral districts and seats ===
- Jämtland County East (Ragunda, Strömsund, and Bräcke); 10 seats
- Jämtland County West (Krokom, Åre, Berg, and Härjedalen); 19 seats
- Östersund (Östersund Municipality); 26 seats
