= Regions of Sweden =

Regional administrative division of Sweden

Regions of Sweden Sveriges regioner (Swedish)
- Sweden's regional borders
- Category: Self-governing administrative division
- Location: Sweden
- Found in: Counties
- Number: 21
- Government: Regional Assembly

In Sweden, a region (Swedish: [rɛɡɪˈuːn]) is a self-governing administrative division responsible primarily for healthcare and public transport. Sweden's regions correspond geographically to Sweden's 21 counties (Swedish: län) and were previously known as county councils (Swedish: landsting) until they were restructured and renamed in 2020. Regions (Swedish: regioner) are one of the principal administrative subdivisions of Sweden.

== Organisation and responsibilities ==
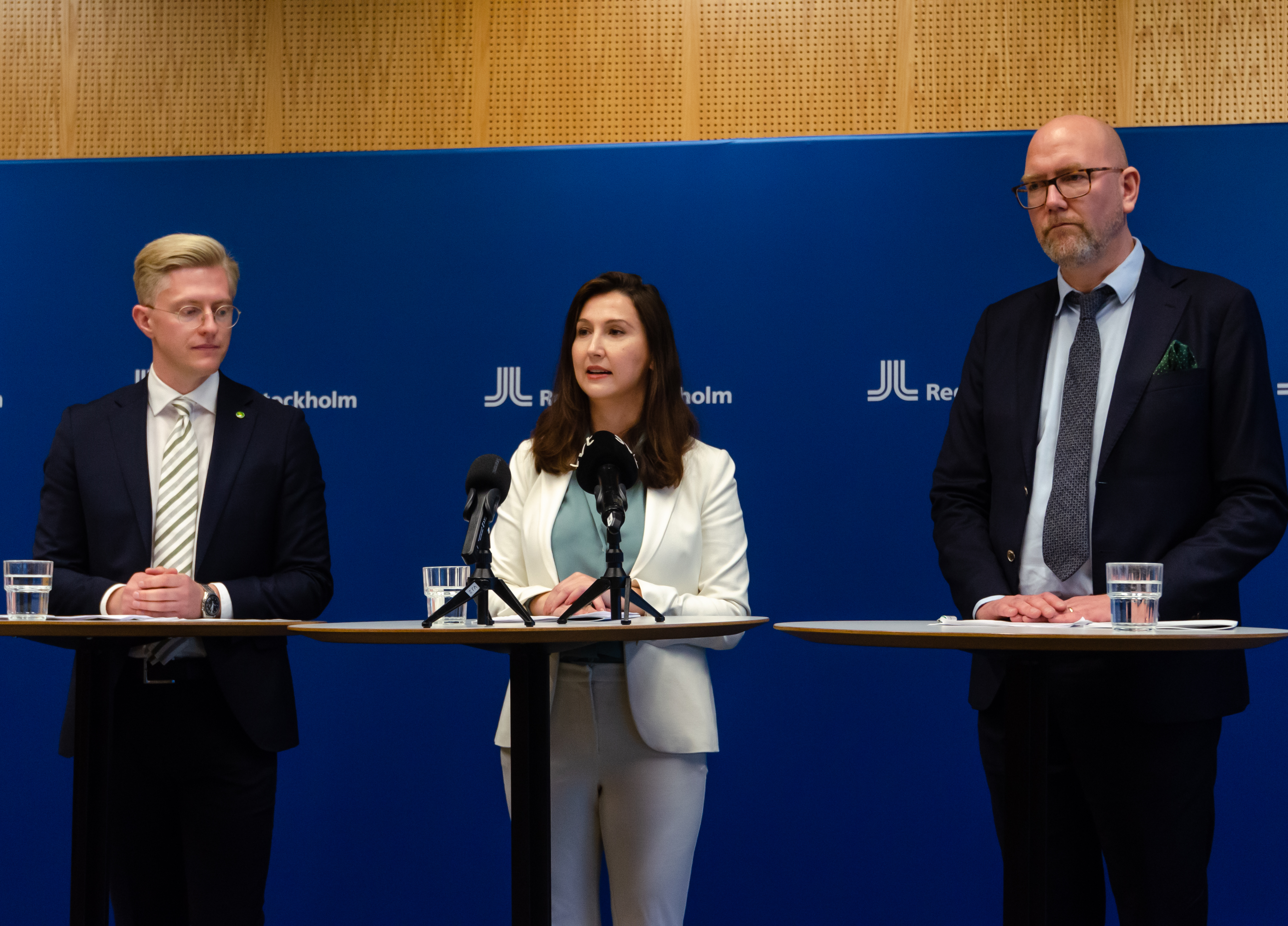
Leaders of Region Stockholm in 2022

According to the Basic Laws of Sweden, regions are described as "municipalities at the regional level". Constitutionally, regions exercise a degree of self-government that does not constitute any degree of federalism, which is consistent with Sweden's status as a unitary state. Regions are responsible for tasks in county-wide geographical areas that often require significant financial resources: primarily healthcare and public transport, but also culture and regional growth and development.

Sweden's regions are not an intermediate level of government between Sweden's national government and municipalities, as there is no hierarchical relationship between Regions and municipalities. Each operates independently with distinct roles. One notable exception is Region Gotland, which serves as both a Region and a municipality due to its unique geographical boundaries.

Each region is governed by a Regional Assembly (Swedish: regionfullmäktige) that is elected every four years in conjunction with the general election and municipal elections. Sweden's regions have financial and political autonomy within their responsibilities, and are entitled to levy income taxes to cover their costs. As of 2010, the regional assemblies had a combined total of 1,696 seats. Within the same geographical borders as the regions, there are county administrative boards, which are appointed by the national government to implement national policy, separate from regional responsibilities.

== History ==
The process of restructuring county councils into regions began gradually in 1999. As part of this reform, certain responsibilities, such as regional development, previously managed by the county administrative boards, were transferred to the regions. Notably, Region Skåne and Region Västra Götaland were formed as trial regions in 1999, merging counties and expanding their responsibilities, including regional development.

Historically, six cities were not part of any county council. These were Gävle (until 1963), Helsingborg (1963), Norrköping (1967), Stockholm (1967), Gothenburg (1997), and Malmö (1997). These cities managed their own responsibilities until they were integrated into the county council system, with Stockholm joining in 1967, and Gothenburg and Malmö in 1997.

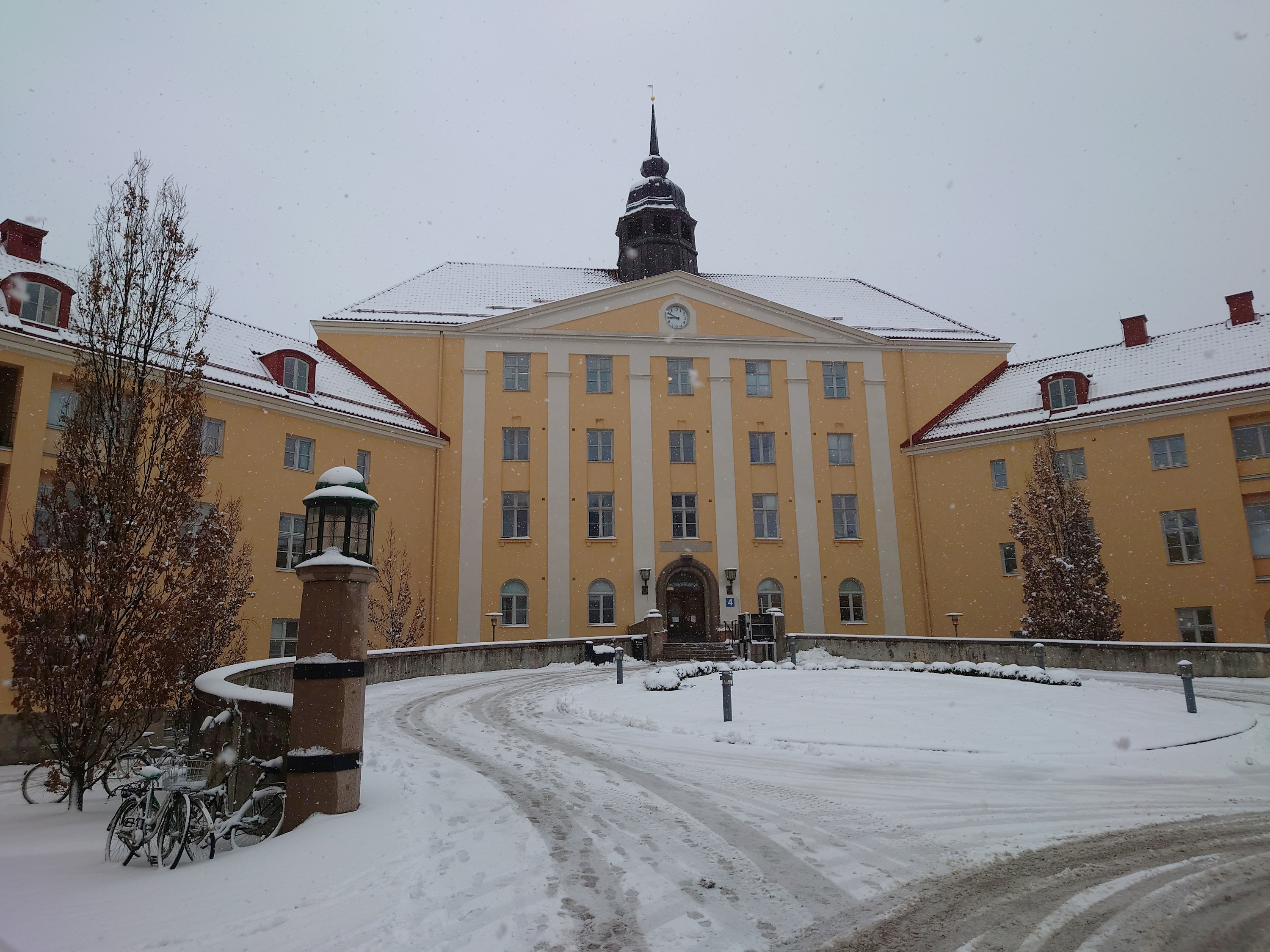
Regionhuset in Västerås, the headquarters of Region Västmanland

In the late 1990s, discussions began on a new regional organization for Sweden. Trial regional self-governing bodies were established in Kalmar County and Gotland. Further reforms saw the merger of counties in Skåne and Västra Götaland, which affected the structure and responsibilities of the relevant county councils. These changes laid the foundation for the formation of Region Skåne and Region Västra Götaland.

In the early 2000s a government committee was tasked with investigating the future responsibilities, structure, and number of councils. The committee's report, published in 2007, suggested reducing the number of counties to between six and nine, and transforming them into Regions that would handle both state responsibilities (previously managed by the County Administrative Boards) and the responsibilities of the county councils. The committee proposed that each Regionshould manage advanced healthcare and have a large university. The committee's recommendations did not result in a nationwide solution, but the trials in Skåne and Västra Götaland were formalised in 2011. This also extended regional responsibilities to Region Gotland and Region Halland.

In 2015, further restructuring took place, with the counties of Örebro, Gävleborg, and Jönköping officially becoming regions. This change also included Östergötland, Kronoberg, and Jämtland. By January 2017, Norrbotten, Uppsala, Västernorrland, and Västmanland were reclassified as regions. Stockholm, Värmland, Kalmar, and Södermanland followed suit in January 2019. Finally, on 1 January 2020, the term County Council was officially replaced by Region in the relevant laws.

== List of regions ==
	County	Region
1.	Blekinge	Region Blekinge
2.	Dalarna	Region Dalarna
3.	Gotland	Gotland Municipality (Note: The Municipality of Gotland is an exception, due to its geographical boundaries, as Gotland Municipality also has the responsibilities of a regional council.)
4.	Gävleborg	Region Gävleborg
5.	Halland	Region Halland
6.	Jämtland	Region Jämtland Härjedalen
7.	Jönköping	Region Jönköping County
8.	Kalmar	Region Kalmar County
9.	Kronoberg	Region Kronoberg
10.	Norrbotten	Region Norrbotten
11.	Skåne	Region Skåne
12.	Stockholm	Region Stockholm
13.	Södermanland	Region Sörmland
14.	Uppsala	Region Uppsala
15.	Värmland	Region Värmland
16.	Västerbotten	Region Västerbotten
17.	Västernorrland	Region Västernorrland
18.	Västmanland	Region Västmanland
19.	Västra Götaland	Region Västra Götaland
20.	Örebro	Region Örebro County
21.	Östergötland	Region Östergötland

== See also ==
- County administrative boards of Sweden
- Regional Board
- Regions of Finland
- Regions of Denmark – Administrative territorial entity of Denmark
