= Region Värmland =

Regional council in Värmland County, Sweden

Coordinates: 59°22′00″N 13°28′47″E

- Regional Council
- Formation: 2019
- County: Värmland County
- Country: Sweden
- Website: www.regionvarmland.se

Legislative branch
- Legislature: Regional Council
- Assembly members: 81

Executive branch
- Headquarters: Karlstad

Region Värmland, formerly known as Värmland County Council (Swedish: Värmlands läns landsting) is the regional council for Värmland County, Sweden. The Region is primarily responsible for healthcare, public transport, cultural policies, and education within the county. The Region was established on 1 January 2019 following the merger of the County Council, Värmlandstrafik, Karlstadsbuss, and the Kommunalförbundet Region Värmland.

== History ==
Before becoming Region Värmland, the entity was known as Värmland County Council. In 2001, a cooperative entity named Kommunalförbundet Region Värmland ("Värmland Region Local Government Association") was established to promote regional development and cooperation between the municipalities and the county council. In 2019, this evolved into the current regional structure.

== Responsibilities ==
=== Healthcare ===
Region Värmland is responsible for providing healthcare services within the county, including the operation of 30 healthcare centres and acute care hospitals located in Karlstad, Arvika, and Torsby.

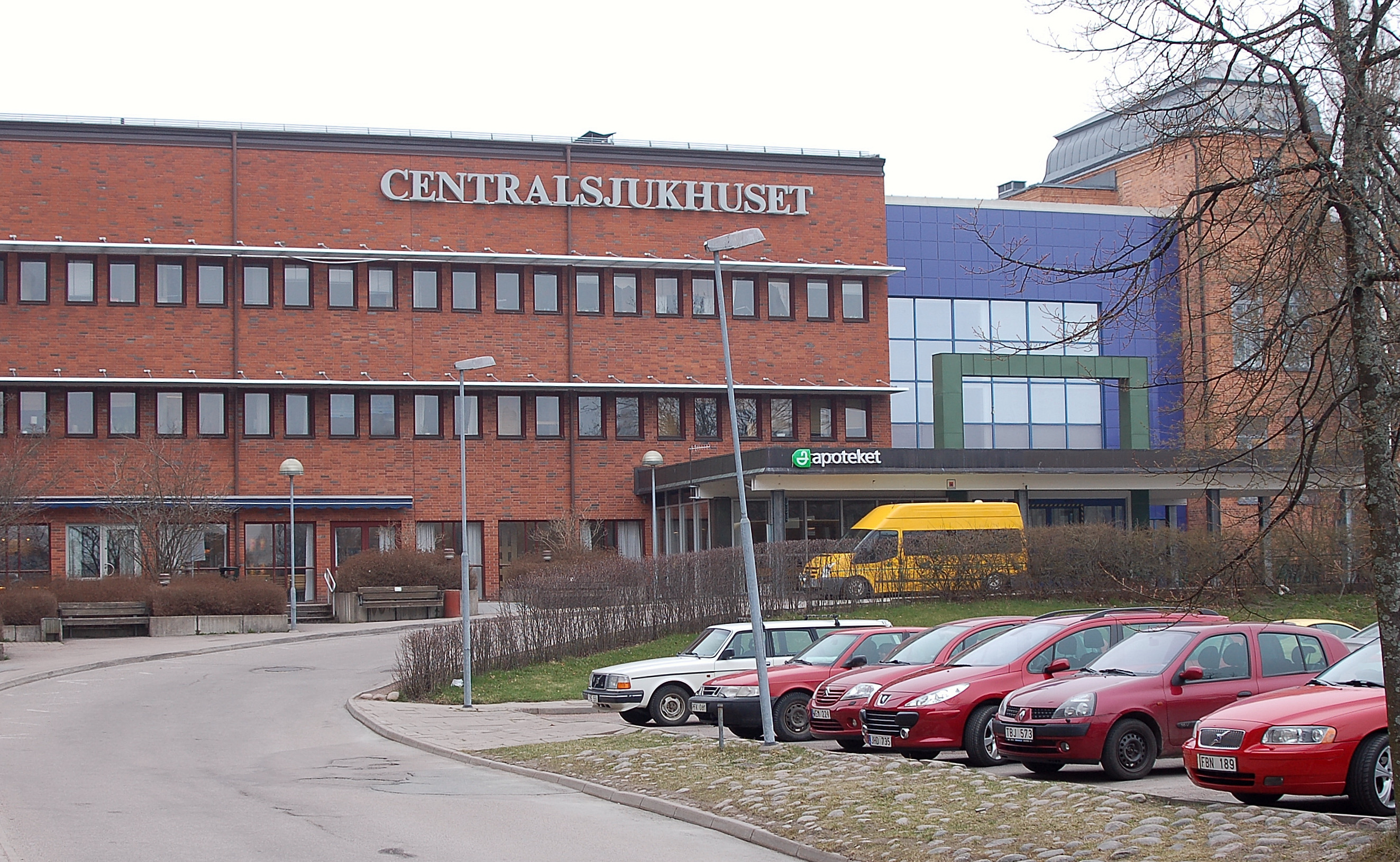
Central hospital in Karlstad

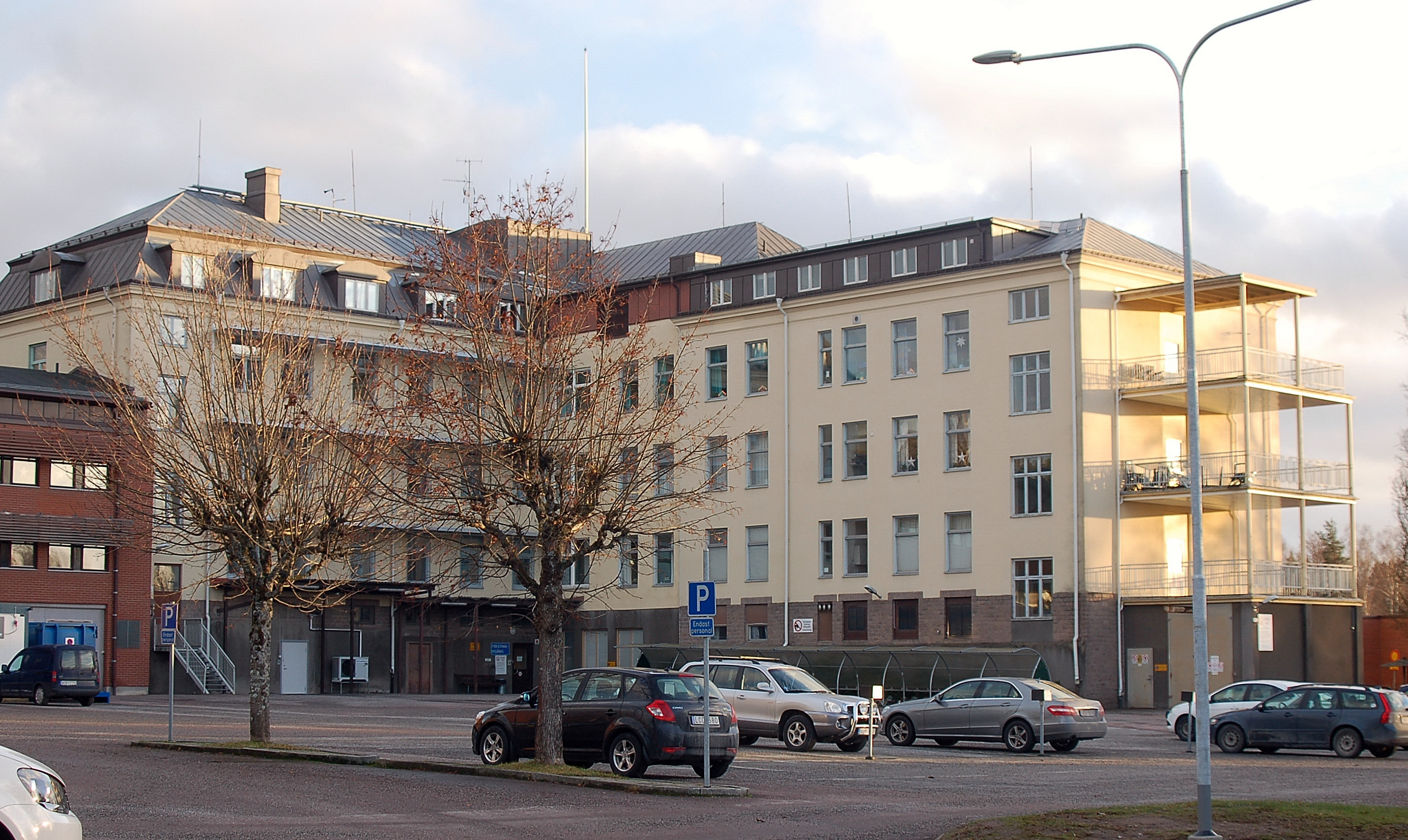
Arvika Hospital

=== Dental Care ===
The Public Dental Service (Folktandvården Värmland) operates clinics providing general dentistry in all 16 municipalities in Värmland, with seven specialist clinics and two hospital dental clinics located in Karlstad and Arvika.

=== Public Transport and Infrastructure ===
Region Värmland is responsible for regional public transport, operating under the brand Värmlandstrafik. Approximately 17 million journeys are made each year via bus and rail.

=== Education and Folk High Schools ===
Region Värmland plays an active role in coordinating education within the county. It oversees five folk high schools that provide both general and vocational courses aimed at enhancing skills and regional development.

- Ingesunds Folk High School
- Klarälvdalen Folk High School
- Kristinehamn Folk High School
- Kyrkerud Folk High School
- Molkoms Folk High School

=== Cultural Affairs ===
Region Värmland is also responsible for the region's cultural development and manages several cultural initiatives:

- Dans i Värmland – a centre for artistic dance
- Film i Värmland – a development centre for the local film industry
- Värmlands Museum and Värmlandsarkiv – managing regional history and archives
- Länsbiblioteket i Värmland – supporting local libraries within the region

=== Regional Development and Growth ===
Region Värmland focuses on strategic development plans to improve quality of life, strengthen businesses, and improve education in the region. This includes promoting energy efficiency, decreasing greenhouse gas emissions, and improving transportation links.

== Politics ==
Region Värmland is governed by a Regional Council and has an executive body called the Regional Executive Board.

=== Electoral Districts ===
Prior to 2018, Värmland was divided into five electoral districts for county elections. After this, the entire county became a single electoral unit for a more equal distribution of mandates. The former districts included:

- Östra valkretsen: Filipstads, Storfors, Kristinehamn
- Centrala valkretsen: Karlstad, Hammarö, Forshaga, Kil
- Sydvästra valkretsen: Grums, Säffle
- Västra valkretsen: Arvika, Eda, Årjäng
- Norra valkretsen: Hagfors, Munkfors, Torsby, Sunne
