= Region Jönköping County =

Regional council of Jönköping County, Sweden

Region Jönköping County Region Jönköpings län
- Regional Council
- Formation: 2015
- County: Jönköping County
- Country: Sweden
- Website: www.rjl.se

Legislative branch
- Legislature: Regional Council
- Assembly members: 81

Executive branch
- Chairman of the Regional Executive Board: Rachel De Basso
- First Deputy Chairman: Tommie Ekered
- Second Deputy Chairman: Mia Frisk
- Headquarters: Jönköping

Region Jönköping County (Swedish: Region Jönköpings län), formerly known as Jönköping County Council (Swedish: Jönköpings läns landsting), is a regional council responsible for healthcare, public transport, and cultural affairs in Jönköping County. It also coordinates regional development efforts in infrastructure, business, employment, and education. The Region was formally established on 1 January 2015 when the Swedish Parliament granted the county council extended responsibilities.

== Organisation ==
The region's operations are divided into two main sectors:

- Public Health and Healthcare
- Regional Development and Growth

This means that the Region is responsible for ensuring access to healthcare, dental care, public transport, and cultural activities. It also carries out regional development projects and coordinates growth initiatives.

The region’s annual budget is approximately 10.7 billion SEK, primarily funded by regional taxes. Residents contribute 11.21 SEK per 100 SEK earned to regional financing.

== Responsibilities ==
Region Jönköpings län oversees healthcare, public transport, and cultural affairs, as well as regional growth and infrastructure planning. The region's vision is "For a good life in an attractive county."

=== Healthcare ===
==== Health Centers ====
There are 52 healthcare centers in Jönköping County under the public healthcare choice system. The Region owns and operates 31 of them.

==== Hospitals ====
Region Jönköpings län provides healthcare across the county through three major hospitals:

- Höglandssjukhuset in Eksjö
- Länssjukhuset Ryhov in Jönköping
- Värnamo Hospital

==== Specialised Healthcare ====
The Region collaborates with Region Östergötland and Region Kalmar county on specialised care, including neurosurgery, cardiac surgery, and burn treatment. Linköping University Hospital serves as the designated referral center for highly specialized treatments.

=== Dental Care ===
==== Public Dental Care ====
Region Jönköpings län operates 27 general dental clinics.

==== Specialist Dental Care ====
Specialist dental care is provided at nine clinics and a Competence Center for Rare Dental Conditions. These facilities are part of the Odontological Institution in Jönköping, which is affiliated with Jönköping University since 2004.

=== Regional Development ===
Region Jönköpings län leads regional development initiatives by collaborating with municipalities, universities, and business organizations. Responsibilities include:

- Formulating and implementing a Regional Development Strategy
- Coordinating efforts to execute the strategy
- Allocating funds for regional growth projects
- Evaluating and reporting progress to the national government
- Managing EU structural fund programs
- Developing county-wide transport infrastructure plans

The regional public transport system, Jönköpings Länstrafik, is managed by the region. Cultural programs include Smålands Musik & Teater, Dance in Jönköpings län, Film in Jönköpings län, the County Handicraft Association, the County Library, and visual arts projects.

Region Jönköpings län also oversees:

- Tenhults Agricultural High School
- Stora Segerstad and Värnamo Agricultural High School
- Sörängens Folk High School
- Värnamo Folk High School

The Regionis a stakeholder in Smålands Turism AB and Almi Företagspartner, and it has international partnerships with Alytus County in Lithuania and the Assembly of European Regions (AER).

== Politics ==
For the 2022–2026 term, the regional government is led by a coalition of the Social Democrats (22 seats), Moderates (14 seats), and Bevara Akutsjukhusen (8 seats). Other parties represented in the regional assembly include:

- Christian Democrats (10)
- Centre Party (6)
- Liberals (3)
- Sweden Democrats (14)
- Left Party (4)

Rachel De Basso (S) serves as Chair of the Regional Executive Board.

=== Regional Executive Board 2022–2026 ===
Position	Name	Party
Chairperson	Rachel De Basso	Social Democrats
First Deputy Chair	Tommie Ekered	Moderates
Second Deputy Chair	Mia Frisk	Christian Democrats

== Electoral Districts ==
Region Jönköpings län is divided into seven electoral districts for regional elections.
