= Region Blekinge =

Local authority of Sweden

- Regional council
- Formation: 1863
- County: Blekinge County
- Country: Sweden
- Website: Official website

Legislative branch
- Legislature: Regional assembly
- Assembly members: 57
- Chair: Birgitta Ståhl (M)
- Deputy Chair: Peter Christensen (L)

Region Blekinge is a region in Blekinge County, Sweden. It was first established in 1863.

The region has 159,362 inhabitants and includes 5 municipalities. Region Blekinge is responsible for maintaining health and dental care services as well as the public transport system.

A regional institution has been formed in a cooperation project between the primary municipalities and county councils in order to take coordinated responsibility for development in the county. In the framework of this project, for example, municipal and county councils have coordinated cultural activities and are responsible for, among others, music and the allocation of funding for the county's cultural associations.

== Councillors ==
The assembly (Swedish: regionfullmäktige) consists of 57 elected councillors, led by:

- Birgitta Ståhl (M): Chairman of the Regional Assembly
- Peter Christensen (L): First Deputy Chairman of the Regional Assembly
- Kalle Sandström (S): Second Deputy Chairman of the Regional Assembly

== Mission ==
The mission of Region Blekinge is, among other things:

- To outline the regional development programme of the county.
- To co-ordinate regional development measures.
- To decide on funds for regional projects.
- To be responsible for infrastructure planning.

== Politics ==
As of the 2018 regional election, the following political parties are represented in the regional assembly.

Party	Seats	Votes	%
Social Democratic Party	19	33,974	32.48%
Sweden Democrats	12	21,509	20.56%
Moderate Party	12	20,969	20.05%
Centre Party	5	7,937	7.59%
Left Party	3	5,967	5.70%
Christian Democrats	3	5,349	5.11%
Liberals	3	5,034	4.81%
Others	-	3,654	3.49%
Total	57	104,593	100%
Turnout		106,530	85.74%

== See also ==
- Politics of Sweden
- Elections in Sweden
