= Region Kronoberg =

Regional council of Kronoberg County, Sweden

- Regional Council
- Formation: 2015
- County: Kronoberg County
- Country: Sweden
- Website: www.regionkronoberg.se

Legislative branch
- Legislature: Regional Council
- Assembly members: 61

Executive branch
- Chairman of the Regional Executive Board: Henrietta Modig Serrate (S)
- Headquarters: Växjö

Region Kronoberg, formerly known as Kronoberg County Council (Swedish: Kronobergs läns landsting), is the regional council for Kronoberg County, one of three counties in the province of Småland, Sweden. Region Kronoberg is responsible for healthcare, public transport, and regional development. The Region was established on 1 January 2015 through the merger of the Kronoberg County Council and the Southern Småland Regional Association.

== Organisation ==
Region Kronoberg is divided into three main administrations:

- Healthcare
- Regional Development
- Public Transport

The organisation has approximately 6,500 employees. The Regional Director leads the work along with directors for healthcare, regional development, and transport. They are supported by the regional staff and service departments.

=== Responsibilities ===
The main responsibilities of Region Kronoberg include:

- Healthcare and medical services
- Public transport and infrastructure
- Education and competence development
- Environmental and climate policies
- Regional planning
- Business and innovation
- Public health and culture

Region Kronoberg also owns or has interests in several companies and economic associations within culture, business, transport, and education.

== Operations ==
=== Healthcare ===
- Central Hospital in Växjö (CLV)
- Ljungby Hospital
- Psychiatric clinics at Sigfridsområdet (Sankt Sigfrid Hospital)
- 21 primary care centers
- 17 public dental clinics (Folktandvården)

=== Public Transport ===
Länstrafiken Kronoberg is the division of Region Kronoberg responsible for public transport within the county.

=== Culture ===
- Smålands Museum

== Politics ==
Since 2024, Region Kronoberg has been governed by a coalition between the Social Democrats and the Moderates.

=== Electoral Districts ===
The region is divided into two electoral districts for regional elections:

Western District:

- Ljungby Municipality
- Markaryd Municipality
- Alvesta Municipality
- Älmhult Municipality

Eastern District:

- Växjö Municipality
- Lessebo Municipality
- Uppvidinge Municipality
- Tingsryd Municipality
