= Gävleborg County =

County (län) of Sweden

Gävleborg County Gävleborgs län (Swedish)
- County of Sweden
- Flag Coat of arms

- Gävleborg County in Sweden

- Location map of Gävleborg County in Sweden
- Coordinates: 60°46′50″N 16°39′19″E
- Country: Sweden
- Founded: 1762
- Capital: Gävle
- Municipalities: 10: Bollnäs; Gävle; Hofors; Hudiksvall; Ljusdal; Nordanstig; Ockelbo; Ovanåker; Sandviken; Söderhamn

Government
  - Governor: Carina Ståhl Herrstedt
  - Council: Region Gävleborg

Area
  - Total: 18,198.9 km^{2} (7,026.6 sq mi)

Population (31 December 2023)
  - Total: 285,642
  - Density: 15.6956/km^{2} (40.6513/sq mi)

GDP
  - Total: SEK 95 billion €10.153 billion (2015)
- Time zone: UTC+1 (CET)
  - Summer (DST): UTC+2 (CEST)
- ISO 3166 code: SE-X
- NUTS Region: SE313
- Website: www.x.lst.se

Gävleborg County (Swedish: Gävleborgs län, pronounced [ˈjɛːvlɛˌbɔrjs ˈlɛːn]) is a county or län on the Baltic Sea coast of Sweden. It borders the counties of Uppsala, Västmanland, Dalarna, Jämtland, and Västernorrland. The capital is Gävle.

== Provinces ==
Gävleborg County encompasses the provinces of Gästrikland and Hälsingland, except for the northwestern part of the latter which is located in Jämtland County, most notably Ytterhogdal. Hamra församling (Hamra parish), in northeast Dalarna is also part of Gävleborg County.

== Geography ==
Gävleborg county is in eastern-central Sweden on the coast of the Gulf of Bothnia. It is made up of Dalarna, the majority of Hälsingland, and the traditional landskap (province) of Gästrikland. From a flat, level coast, it rises inland toward forested highland.

=== Lakes ===
- Gunnarsbosjön
- Dellen
- Gråsjön
- Rödjarbosjön
- Brukssjön

== Administration ==
Gävleborg County was established in 1762 when it was separated from Västernorrland County. For the list of governors see main article. The main aim of the County Administrative Board is to fulfil the goals set by the national policy by the Riksdag and the Government, to coordinate the interests and promote the development of the county, to establish regional goals and safeguard the due process of law in the handling of each case. The County Administrative Board is a Government Agency headed by a Governor. See List of Gävleborg Governors.

== Politics ==
The county council of Gävleborg or Region Gävleborg.

After the county council election in 2018, the following political parties are represented in the Gävleborg county council:

| Party | Seats | Votes | % |
|---|---|---|---|
| Social Democrats | 24 | 58,521 | 31.63% |
| Moderate Party | 11 | 27,556 | 14.89% |
| Sweden Democrats | 11 | 27,494 | 14.86% |
| Centre Party | 8 | 18,146 | 9.81% |
| Left Party | 7 | 15,809 | 8.54% |
| Health Care Party Gävleborg | 5 | 13,176 | 7.12% |
| Christian Democrats | 4 | 9,364 | 5.06% |
| Liberals | 3 | 8,440 | 4.56% |
| Green Party | 2 | 5,720 | 3.09% |
| Others | - | 805 | 0.43% |
| Total | 75 | 185,031 | 100% |
| Turnout | | 188,764 | 83.78% |

== Riksdag elections ==
The table details all Riksdag election results of Gävleborg County since the unicameral era began in 1970. The blocs denote which party would support the Prime Minister or the lead opposition party towards the end of the elected parliament.

| Year | Turnout | Votes | V | S | MP | C | L | KD | M | SD | NyD | Left | Right |
|---|---|---|---|---|---|---|---|---|---|---|---|---|---|
| 1970 | 86.6 | 183,731 | 8.0 | 52.0 | | 21.7 | 10.7 | 1.4 | 5.0 | | | 60.1 | 38.1 |
| 1973 | 89.6 | 189,221 | 8.2 | 50.1 | | 26.0 | 6.7 | 1.6 | 7.0 | | | 58.3 | 39.7 |
| 1976 | 90.5 | 198,949 | 6.3 | 50.9 | | 25.9 | 7.9 | 1.2 | 7.4 | | | 57.2 | 41.2 |
| 1979 | 89.8 | 198,508 | 6.7 | 52.2 | | 20.4 | 7.9 | 1.4 | 10.7 | | | 59.0 | 39.1 |
| 1982 | 90.7 | 202,022 | 6.7 | 54.4 | 1.8 | 16.9 | 4.4 | 1.7 | 13.9 | | | 61.1 | 35.2 |
| 1985 | 88.6 | 198,530 | 6.7 | 53.6 | 1.6 | 13.8 | 11.2 | | 12.7 | | | 60.3 | 37.7 |
| 1988 | 84.6 | 187,245 | 7.2 | 51.9 | 5.1 | 13.2 | 9.7 | 2.7 | 9.6 | | | 64.2 | 32.5 |
| 1991 | 85.3 | 188,011 | 5.8 | 46.9 | 3.4 | 10.7 | 7.9 | 6.1 | 12.8 | | 6.0 | 52.7 | 37.4 |
| 1994 | 85.3 | 186,959 | 7.9 | 53.6 | 5.5 | 9.1 | 5.8 | 3.2 | 13.2 | | 1.1 | 67.0 | 31.3 |
| 1998 | 79.4 | 170,128 | 16.6 | 42.5 | 5.1 | 7.0 | 3.5 | 9.7 | 13.9 | | | 64.2 | 34.2 |
| 2002 | 77.6 | 164,934 | 11.2 | 45.0 | 4.5 | 10.4 | 10.0 | 7.4 | 9.4 | 1.0 | | 60.6 | 37.3 |
| 2006 | 79.3 | 167,728 | 7.9 | 41.7 | 4.3 | 11.1 | 5.3 | 5.1 | 18.4 | 3.0 | | 54.0 | 40.0 |
| 2010 | 82.8 | 177,248 | 7.2 | 38.3 | 6.2 | 7.3 | 5.3 | 4.1 | 23.1 | 7.1 | | 51.7 | 39.9 |
| 2014 | 85.4 | 183,515 | 6.6 | 38.2 | 5.0 | 6.7 | 3.7 | 3.2 | 17.4 | 16.0 | | 49.8 | 31.0 |
| 2018 | 86.3 | 185,413 | 8.4 | 34.1 | 3.1 | 9.1 | 4.0 | 5.3 | 15.3 | 19.6 | | 54.6 | 44.2 |
| 2022 | 83.5 | 184,770 | 5.9 | 34.7 | 3.5 | 6.3 | 3.0 | 5.1 | 16.2 | 24.1 | | 50.4 | 48.4 |

== Municipalities ==
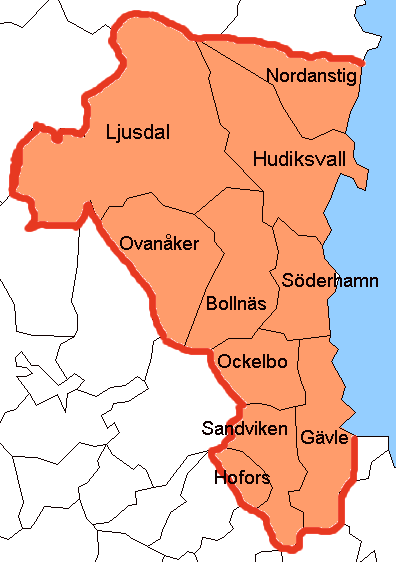

In Gästrikland Province:

- Gävle
- Hofors
- Ockelbo
- Sandviken

In Hälsingland Province:

- Bollnäs
- Hudiksvall
- Ljusdal
- Nordanstig
- Ovanåker
- Söderhamn

== Demographics ==
=== Foreign background ===
SCB have collected statistics on backgrounds of residents since 2002. These tables consist of all who have two foreign-born parents or are born abroad themselves. The chart lists election years and the last year on record alone.

| Location | 2002 | 2006 | 2010 | 2014 | 2018 | 2019 |
|---|---|---|---|---|---|---|
| Bollnäs | 4.9 | 5.6 | 7.7 | 10.8 | 14.5 | 14.7 |
| Gävle | 10.7 | 12.0 | 14.4 | 17.2 | 19.7 | 20.5 |
| Hofors | 12.4 | 13.5 | 15.3 | 16.2 | 18.8 | 19.0 |
| Hudiksvall | 5.7 | 6.5 | 7.9 | 9.6 | 11.4 | 11.8 |
| Ljusdal | 4.0 | 5.3 | 7.2 | 10.0 | 12.5 | 12.3 |
| Nordanstig | 3.9 | 4.3 | 6.8 | 9.0 | 10.7 | 10.7 |
| Ockelbo | 4.4 | 4.9 | 8.1 | 11.0 | 16.2 | 16.4 |
| Ovanåker | 2.6 | 3.5 | 4.6 | 7.1 | 10.4 | 10.8 |
| Sandviken | 8.4 | 9.8 | 12.5 | 16.3 | 21.3 | 21.9 |
| Söderhamn | 5.8 | 6.8 | 8.6 | 11.6 | 15.4 | 16.0 |
| Total | 7.5 | 8.7 | 10.8 | 13.6 | 16.7 | 17.2 |
Source: SCB

== Heraldry ==
The arms for Gävleborg County is a combination of the arms of Gästrikland and Hälsingland. When it is shown with a royal crown it represents the County Administrative Board. Blazon: "Quartered, the arms of Gästrikland and the arms of Hälsingland."

== See also ==
- Duke of Gästrikland & Duke of Hälsingland, titles for members of the royal family (see Duchies in Sweden)
  The tiles have been created for the first time for present Princess Madeleine, Duchess of Hälsingland and Gästrikland
