= Jönköping County (Riksdag constituency) =

Constituency of the Riksdag, the national legislature of Sweden

- Jönköpings Län
- Constituency for the Riksdag
- Location of Jönköping County within Sweden
- County: Jönköping
- Population: 369,721 (2025)
- Electorate: 279,116 (2026)
- Area: 11,743 km^{2} (2026)

Current constituency
- Created: 1970
- Seats: List (Note: Constituency seats only.): 11 (2002–present); 12 (1998–2002); 11 (1973–1998); 12 (1970–1973)
- Member of the Riksdag: List: Emma Brihall (C); Ilan de Basso (S); Yasmine Eriksson (SD); Mats Green (M); Johanna Haraldsson (S); Ida Kors (SD); Azra Muranovic (S); Erik Nygårds (L); Camilla Rinaldo Miller (KD); Rikard Salander (MP); Susanne Wahlström (M); Ciczie Weidby (V); Eric Westroth (SD)
- Created from: Jönköping County

Jönköping County (Swedish: Jönköpings Län) is one of the 29 multi-member constituencies of the Riksdag, the national legislature of Sweden. The constituency was established in 1970 when the Riksdag changed from a bicameral legislature to a unicameral legislature. It is conterminous with the county of Jönköping. The constituency currently elects 11 of the 349 members of the Riksdag using the open party-list proportional representation electoral system. At the 2026 general election it had 279,116 registered electors.

== Electoral system ==
Jönköping County currently elects 11 of the 349 members of the Riksdag using the open party-list proportional representation electoral system. Constituency seats are allocated using the modified Sainte-Laguë method. Only parties that reach the 4% national threshold and parties that receive at least 12% of the vote in the constituency compete for constituency seats. Supplementary levelling seats may also be allocated at the constituency level to parties that reach the 4% national threshold.

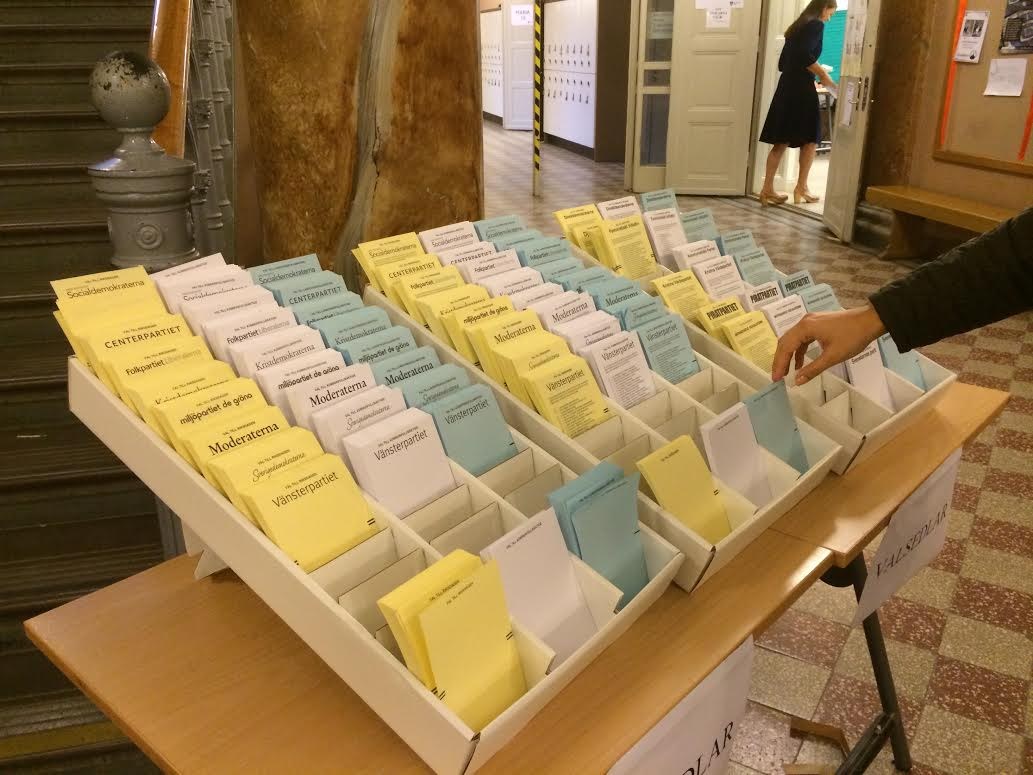
A selection of ballot papers available for voters at the 2014 general election in Stockholm - yellow for the Riksdag, blue for the regional council and white for the municipal council

Prior to 1997 voters could cast any ballot paper they wanted, though it had to contain the name of a party and the name of at least one candidate nominated by that party in the constituency. It was common for parties to hand out ballot papers with their name and list of candidates at the entrance of polling stations. Voters could delete the names of candidates or write-in the names of other candidates but in practice these options weren't used enough by voters to have any significant impact on the results and consequently elections operated as a closed system.

Since 1997, elections in Sweden follow the French model in having separate ballot papers for each party/list in a constituency. There are two ballot papers for each party - a party ballot paper (partivalsedel) with just the name of the party and a name ballot paper (namnvalsedel) with the name of the party and its list of candidates. There are also blank ballot papers (blank valsedel). Voters can initially pick as many ballot papers as they wish and then, in the secrecy of the voting booth, they select a single ballot paper of their choice. If they chose a name ballot paper they have the option of casting a preferential vote for one of their chosen party's candidates. If they chose a blank ballot paper they can write the name of any party including unregistered parties and, optionally, they can write the name of any person as their preferred candidate, even one that does not belong to their chosen party. They then place their chosen ballot paper in an envelope which is placed in the ballot box, discarding all other ballot papers they picked.

Seats won by each party/list in a constituency are allocated to its candidates in order of preference votes (a personal mandate), provided that the candidate has received at least 8% of votes cast for their party in the constituency (5% since January 2011). Any unfilled seats are then allocated to the party's remaining candidates in the order they appear on the party list (a party mandate).

== Election results ==
=== Summary ===
Election	Left V / VPK			Social Democrats S			Greens MP			Centre C			Liberals L / FP / F			Moderates M			Christian Democrats KD / KDS			Sweden Democrats SD		
Election	Votes	%	Seats	Votes	%	Seats	Votes	%	Seats	Votes	%	Seats	Votes	%	Seats	Votes	%	Seats	Votes	%	Seats	Votes	%	Seats
2026	14,106	5.96%	1	62,904	26.58%	3	9,032	3.82%	0	16,567	7.00%	1	10,874	4.59%	0	46,733	19.75%	2	24,225	10.24%	1	48,704	20.58%	3
2022	9,069	3.96%	0	66,568	29.05%	4	7,377	3.22%	0	17,078	7.45%	1	8,480	3.70%	0	42,913	18.73%	2	21,326	9.31%	1	53,338	23.28%	3
2018	11,283	4.91%	1	63,782	27.78%	3	7,401	3.22%	0	23,084	10.05%	1	9,096	3.96%	0	40,542	17.66%	2	27,437	11.95%	2	44,216	19.26%	2
2014	8,685	3.87%	0	71,487	31.83%	4	12,095	5.39%	0	17,800	7.93%	1	8,090	3.60%	0	45,594	20.30%	3	23,322	10.38%	1	32,815	14.61%	2
2010	8,775	4.05%	0	66,316	30.62%	4	11,438	5.28%	0	16,859	7.78%	1	12,134	5.60%	0	57,901	26.74%	3	27,822	12.85%	2	13,888	6.41%	1
2006	8,734	4.25%	0	72,757	35.44%	5	7,070	3.44%	0	17,290	8.42%	1	10,982	5.35%	0	45,302	22.07%	3	32,946	16.05%	2	6,514	3.17%	0
2002	11,417	5.74%	0	78,670	39.54%	5	6,400	3.22%	0	14,510	7.29%	1	17,978	9.03%	1	25,267	12.70%	2	40,316	20.26%	2	1,994	1.00%	0
1998	17,533	8.78%	1	68,773	34.43%	5	7,245	3.63%	0	13,365	6.69%	1	6,409	3.21%	0	36,820	18.43%	2	45,462	22.76%	3			
1994	8,770	4.37%	0	83,870	41.78%	5	8,369	4.17%	0	21,637	10.78%	1	12,481	6.22%	1	39,947	19.90%	3	21,549	10.73%	1			
1991	5,599	2.79%	0	69,823	34.84%	5	4,951	2.47%	0	22,032	10.99%	1	14,756	7.36%	1	37,680	18.80%	2	33,637	16.79%	2			
1988	6,659	3.37%	0	78,968	39.97%	5	7,507	3.80%	0	28,712	14.53%	2	22,081	11.18%	2	32,004	16.20%	2	20,853	10.56%	0			
1985	6,290	3.08%	0	82,093	40.25%	5	2,114	1.04%	0	44,207	21.67%	2	29,091	14.26%	2	39,646	19.44%	2	with C					
1982	6,066	2.97%	0	81,988	40.12%	5	2,303	1.13%	0	40,200	19.67%	2	13,704	6.71%	1	45,964	22.49%	3	13,879	6.79%	0			
1979	6,435	3.19%	0	75,507	37.40%	5				48,343	23.95%	3	22,813	11.30%	1	39,610	19.62%	2	8,478	4.20%	0			
1976	5,033	2.48%	0	73,849	36.44%	4				61,554	30.37%	4	23,237	11.47%	1	31,188	15.39%	2	7,378	3.64%	0			
1973	5,442	2.82%	0	73,431	38.07%	5				56,395	29.24%	3	19,077	9.89%	1	27,238	14.12%	2	10,696	5.55%	0			
1970	5,356	2.78%	0	74,904	38.89%	5				48,998	25.44%	3	30,117	15.64%	2	23,960	12.44%	2	9,025	4.69%	0			

(Excludes levelling seats. Figures in italics represent alliances/joint lists.)

=== Detailed ===
Party has received at least 4% of the vote nationally and is entitled to compete for constituency seats.

==== 2020s ====
===== 2026 =====
Results of the 2026 general election held on 13 September 2026:

Party		Votes per municipality													Total votes	%	Seats		
Party		Aneby	Eksjö	Gisla- ved	Gnosjö	Habo	Jönkö- ping	Mullsjö	Nässjö	Sävsjö	Tranås	Vagge- ryd	Värn- amo	Vet- landa	Total votes	%	Con.	Lev.	Tot.
Swedish Social Democratic Party	S	1,004	3,023	4,459	1,265	2,016	26,543	1,175	5,429	1,446	3,684	2,430	6,090	4,340	62,904	26.58%	3	0	3
Sweden Democrats	SD	1,084	2,412	4,024	1,238	1,977	16,718	1,275	4,795	1,862	2,555	2,191	4,317	4,256	48,704	20.58%	3	0	3
Moderate Party	M	818	2,207	3,532	1,090	1,909	19,385	851	3,423	1,383	2,335	1,762	4,829	3,209	46,733	19.75%	2	0	2
Christian Democrats	KD	600	1,102	1,542	785	1,127	9,467	621	1,881	954	969	1,081	2,223	1,873	24,225	10.24%	1	0	1
Centre Party	C	400	997	1,167	344	647	6,963	332	1,114	459	724	643	1,583	1,194	16,567	7.00%	1	0	1
Left Party	V	189	616	1,252	241	284	6,340	204	1,232	432	703	483	1,098	1,032	14,106	5.96%	1	0	1
Liberals	L	203	591	740	240	403	4,665	190	857	351	560	349	979	746	10,874	4.59%	0	1	1
Green Party	MP	137	486	393	119	347	4,516	231	640	172	503	276	728	484	9,032	3.82%	0	1	1
Alternative for Sweden	AfS	25	52	72	62	26	395	12	76	47	38	39	81	71	996	0.42%	0	0	0
Örebro Party	ÖP	18	53	58	24	36	275	36	122	21	41	67	72	101	924	0.39%	0	0	0
Christian Values Party	KrVP	31	42	16	23	39	288	23	35	50	20	29	75	92	763	0.32%	0	0	0
Pirate Party	PP	1	6	10	2	8	118	4	9	1	10	6	38	8	221	0.09%	0	0	0
Ambition Sweden	AS	6	18	17	7	7	66	7	27	2	14	12	12	15	210	0.09%	0	0	0
Citizens' Coalition	MED	3	6	33	3	2	33	5	7	2	5	1	17	5	122	0.05%	0	0	0
Human Rights and Democracy	MoD	7	7	1	3	1	37	3	8	3	14	0	7	2	93	0.04%	0	0	0
Communist Party of Sweden	SKP	0	1	2	0	0	27	1	3	1	2	3	10	4	54	0.02%	0	0	0
United Voice	ER	1	0	0	0	0	20	0	1	0	1	0	1	6	30	0.01%	0	0	0
Direct Democrats	DD	1	1	1	1	0	6	0	3	1	3	1	2	0	20	0.01%	0	0	0
Nordic Resistance Movement	NMR	0	0	2	0	1	3	1	3	0	0	0	2	3	15	0.01%	0	0	0
Communist Party	K	0	0	6	0	0	7	0	0	0	1	0	0	0	14	0.01%	0	0	0
RegleraAI.nu		0	0	0	0	0	0	0	14	0	0	0	0	0	14	0.01%	0	0	0
Classical Liberal Party	KLP	0	0	0	0	0	6	0	0	0	0	0	0	0	6	0.00%	0	0	0
Donald Duck Party		1	0	1	0	0	3	0	0	0	0	0	0	1	6	0.00%	0	0	0
Nuance Party	PNy	0	0	0	0	0	4	0	0	0	2	0	0	0	6	0.00%	0	0	0
Independent Rural Party	LPo	0	1	0	0	0	1	0	0	0	0	0	0	3	5	0.00%	0	0	0
Jesus		0	0	0	0	0	1	4	0	0	0	0	0	0	5	0.00%	0	0	0
Revolutionary Party		0	0	0	0	0	4	0	0	0	0	0	0	0	4	0.00%	0	0	0
A Good Sweden		0	0	0	0	0	1	0	1	0	0	0	0	0	2	0.00%	0	0	0
For the Good of All		0	0	0	0	0	0	0	0	0	0	0	2	0	2	0.00%	0	0	0
Insurgent Democrats		0	0	0	0	0	0	0	0	0	0	0	2	0	2	0.00%	0	0	0
Naturist Party		0	0	1	0	0	1	0	0	0	0	0	0	0	2	0.00%	0	0	0
The Push Buttons	Kn	0	0	0	0	0	1	0	0	0	0	1	0	0	2	0.00%	0	0	0
Unity	ENH	0	0	0	0	0	2	0	0	0	0	0	0	0	2	0.00%	0	0	0
Volt Sweden	Volt	0	0	0	0	0	1	0	1	0	0	0	0	0	2	0.00%	0	0	0
99 Black Balloons		0	0	0	0	0	1	0	0	0	0	0	0	0	1	0.00%	0	0	0
Evil Chicken Party	OKP	0	0	0	0	0	1	0	0	0	0	0	0	0	1	0.00%	0	0	0
Free Party		0	0	0	1	0	0	0	0	0	0	0	0	0	1	0.00%	0	0	0
John Party with Extra Moose		0	0	0	0	0	0	0	0	0	1	0	0	0	1	0.00%	0	0	0
Lovely		0	0	0	0	0	0	0	0	0	0	0	0	1	1	0.00%	0	0	0
Party People		0	0	0	0	0	0	0	0	0	0	1	0	0	1	0.00%	0	0	0
Pensioners' Party		0	1	0	0	0	0	0	0	0	0	0	0	0	1	0.00%	0	0	0
Responsible Intelligence in Politics		0	0	0	0	0	0	0	0	0	0	1	0	0	1	0.00%	0	0	0
Secular Humanist Party		0	0	0	0	0	0	0	0	0	0	0	1	0	1	0.00%	0	0	0
Socialist Party		0	0	0	0	0	0	0	0	0	0	0	0	1	1	0.00%	0	0	0
United Sweden		0	0	0	0	0	1	0	0	0	0	0	0	0	1	0.00%	0	0	0
Valid votes		4,529	11,622	17,329	5,448	8,830	95,900	4,975	19,681	7,187	12,185	9,376	22,169	17,447	236,678	100.00%	11	2	13
Blank votes		48	116	224	69	74	827	52	201	53	90	83	189	143	2,169	0.91%			
Rejected votes – unregistered parties		0	3	2	1	0	30	1	4	0	3	1	3	2	50	0.02%			
Rejected votes – other		5	9	10	6	3	45	3	5	3	9	3	16	9	126	0.05%			
Total polled		4,582	11,750	17,565	5,524	8,907	96,802	5,031	19,891	7,243	12,287	9,463	22,377	17,601	239,023	85.64%			
Registered electors		5,199	13,650	21,356	6,746	9,718	112,333	5,741	23,552	8,435	14,263	10,953	26,402	20,768	279,116				
Turnout		88.13%	86.08%	82.25%	81.89%	91.65%	86.17%	87.63%	84.46%	85.87%	86.15%	86.40%	84.75%	84.75%	85.64%				

The following candidates were elected:

- Constituency seats (personal mandates) - Emma Brihall (C), 1,106 votes; Mats Green (M), 3,146 votes; and Ciczie Weidby (V), 784 votes.
- Constituency seats (party mandates) - Ilan de Basso (S), 1,972 votes; Yasmine Eriksson (SD), 3 votes; Johanna Haraldsson (S), 2,262 votes; Ida Kors (SD), 336 votes; Azra Muranovic (S), 1,836 votes; Camilla Rinaldo Miller (KD), 433 votes; Susanne Wahlström (M), 510 votes; and Eric Westroth (SD), 120 votes.
- Levelling seats (party mandates) - Erik Nygårds (L), 130 votes; and Rikard Salander (MP), 287 votes.

===== 2022 =====
Results of the 2022 general election held on 11 September 2022:

Party		Votes per municipality													Total votes	%	Seats		
Party		Aneby	Eksjö	Gisla- ved	Gnosjö	Habo	Jönkö- ping	Mullsjö	Nässjö	Sävsjö	Tranås	Vagge- ryd	Värn- amo	Vet- landa	Total votes	%	Con.	Lev.	Tot.
Swedish Social Democratic Party	S	1,115	3,264	4,982	1,358	2,173	27,026	1,274	5,773	1,603	4,067	2,724	6,421	4,788	66,568	29.05%	4	0	4
Sweden Democrats	SD	1,203	2,791	4,732	1,464	1,965	17,560	1,326	5,385	2,112	2,783	2,294	4,870	4,853	53,338	23.28%	3	0	3
Moderate Party	M	749	2,038	3,321	1,139	1,690	17,559	805	3,056	1,229	2,189	1,495	4,560	3,083	42,913	18.73%	2	0	2
Christian Democrats	KD	511	912	1,334	716	920	8,207	612	1,617	1,051	832	940	1,995	1,679	21,326	9.31%	1	0	1
Centre Party	C	414	1,039	1,216	399	580	6,831	280	1,193	492	761	689	1,854	1,330	17,078	7.45%	1	0	1
Left Party	V	119	414	598	143	229	4,346	191	777	215	447	303	769	518	9,069	3.96%	0	1	1
Liberals	L	154	437	515	166	316	3,995	156	617	158	412	317	732	505	8,480	3.70%	0	1	1
Green Party	MP	122	346	317	92	269	3,795	188	586	113	383	229	528	409	7,377	3.22%	0	0	0
Christian Values Party	KrVP	25	33	7	2	34	185	19	31	58	26	22	49	72	563	0.25%	0	0	0
Alternative for Sweden	AfS	24	22	31	10	27	214	10	47	20	23	28	53	49	558	0.24%	0	0	0
Nuance Party	PNy	9	66	40	14	4	209	3	42	44	12	33	29	53	558	0.24%	0	0	0
Citizens' Coalition	MED	4	15	14	5	11	117	10	38	7	16	11	15	8	271	0.12%	0	0	0
Pirate Party	PP	3	18	10	3	5	110	7	22	5	6	12	17	5	223	0.10%	0	0	0
Human Rights and Democracy	MoD	1	13	12	0	11	98	5	12	1	24	9	9	13	208	0.09%	0	0	0
The Push Buttons	Kn	0	9	15	2	7	34	7	11	3	8	14	14	7	131	0.06%	0	0	0
Feminist Initiative	FI	2	6	3	2	2	48	2	5	1	1	3	7	6	88	0.04%	0	0	0
Independent Rural Party	LPo	2	13	4	2	3	2	5	13	6	1	4	12	9	76	0.03%	0	0	0
Socialist Welfare Party	S-V	0	0	1	0	0	70	0	1	0	0	0	3	1	76	0.03%	0	0	0
Nordic Resistance Movement	NMR	3	5	10	0	2	6	0	3	0	5	0	4	10	48	0.02%	0	0	0
Direct Democrats	DD	2	4	3	0	3	16	1	7	0	4	0	2	5	47	0.02%	0	0	0
Unity	ENH	2	4	1	0	1	17	1	3	0	3	4	4	1	41	0.02%	0	0	0
Climate Alliance	KA	1	3	0	0	1	7	1	4	1	3	0	2	1	24	0.01%	0	0	0
Sweden Out of the EU/ Free Justice Party		0	3	0	0	0	0	0	5	0	0	4	0	0	12	0.01%	0	0	0
Turning Point Party	PV	0	0	0	0	0	2	0	1	0	0	0	7	0	10	0.00%	0	0	0
Communist Party of Sweden	SKP	0	0	0	0	1	2	0	1	0	2	3	0	0	9	0.00%	0	0	0
Classical Liberal Party	KLP	0	0	1	1	1	1	0	0	0	0	0	2	1	7	0.00%	0	0	0
Hard Line Sweden		0	0	1	0	0	3	0	0	0	1	0	0	1	6	0.00%	0	0	0
Political Shift		0	0	5	0	0	1	0	0	0	0	0	0	0	6	0.00%	0	0	0
Donald Duck Party		0	1	1	0	0	2	0	0	0	0	0	0	0	4	0.00%	0	0	0
Basic Income Party	BASIP	0	1	0	0	1	0	0	0	0	0	0	0	0	2	0.00%	0	0	0
Change Party Revolution		0	0	0	0	0	2	0	0	0	0	0	0	0	2	0.00%	0	0	0
Immigrant Party		0	0	0	0	0	2	0	0	0	0	0	0	0	2	0.00%	0	0	0
Corn Party		0	0	0	0	0	0	0	0	0	0	0	0	1	1	0.00%	0	0	0
Electoral Cooperation Party		0	0	0	0	0	1	0	0	0	0	0	0	0	1	0.00%	0	0	0
Freedom Party		0	0	0	0	0	1	0	0	0	0	0	0	0	1	0.00%	0	0	0
Now That Will Be Enough		0	0	0	0	0	1	0	0	0	0	0	0	0	1	0.00%	0	0	0
Valid votes		4,465	11,457	17,174	5,518	8,256	90,470	4,903	19,250	7,119	12,009	9,138	21,958	17,408	229,125	100.00%	11	2	13
Blank votes		40	128	235	52	102	881	59	186	61	129	90	212	160	2,335	1.01%			
Rejected votes – unregistered parties		1	1	8	0	1	15	0	2	0	0	1	3	3	35	0.02%			
Rejected votes – other		5	6	19	1	3	69	6	15	3	14	3	17	13	174	0.08%			
Total polled		4,511	11,592	17,436	5,571	8,362	91,435	4,968	19,453	7,183	12,152	9,232	22,190	17,584	231,669	85.28%			
Registered electors		5,113	13,389	21,367	6,831	9,141	107,336	5,604	22,963	8,376	14,204	10,637	26,042	20,663	271,666				
Turnout		88.23%	86.58%	81.60%	81.55%	91.48%	85.19%	88.65%	84.71%	85.76%	85.55%	86.79%	85.21%	85.10%	85.28%				

The following candidates were elected:

- Constituency seats (personal mandates) - Jimmie Åkesson (SD), 17,856 votes; Mats Green (M), 3,220 votes; and Annie Lööf (C), 3,845 votes.
- Constituency seats (party mandates) - Acko Ankarberg Johansson (KD), 792 votes; Helena Bouveng (M), 513 votes; Ilan de Basso (S), 2,158 votes; Staffan Eklöf (SD), 158 votes; Johanna Haraldsson (S), 1,406 votes; Carina Ödebrink (S), 2,051 votes; Niklas Sigvardsson (S), 762 votes; and Eric Westroth (SD), 265 votes.
- Levelling seats (personal mandates) - Jakob Olofsgård (L), 493 votes; and Ciczie Weidby (V), 677 votes.

Permanent substitutions:

- Ilan de Basso (S) resigned on 26 September 2022 and was replaced by Azra Muranovic (S) on the same day.
- Annie Lööf (C) resigned on 19 February 2023 and was replaced by Anders Karlsson (C) on 20 February 2023.

==== 2010s ====
===== 2018 =====
Results of the 2018 general election held on 9 September 2018:

Party		Votes per municipality													Total votes	%	Seats		
Party		Aneby	Eksjö	Gisla- ved	Gnosjö	Habo	Jönkö- ping	Mullsjö	Nässjö	Sävsjö	Tranås	Vagge- ryd	Värn- amo	Vet- landa	Total votes	%	Con.	Lev.	Tot.
Swedish Social Democratic Party	S	1,073	3,014	5,223	1,541	1,839	24,890	1,220	5,698	1,550	3,889	2,585	6,335	4,925	63,782	27.78%	3	0	3
Sweden Democrats	SD	947	2,214	3,956	1,275	1,550	14,762	1,065	4,443	1,796	2,393	1,796	4,097	3,922	44,216	19.26%	2	0	2
Moderate Party	M	726	1,915	3,261	1,081	1,528	16,782	681	2,990	1,154	2,050	1,345	4,030	2,999	40,542	17.66%	2	0	2
Christian Democrats	KD	652	1,190	1,393	876	1,172	11,044	864	2,090	1,261	1,123	1,150	2,572	2,050	27,437	11.95%	2	0	2
Centre Party	C	573	1,403	2,110	572	679	8,300	337	1,634	695	1,127	912	2,804	1,938	23,084	10.05%	1	0	1
Left Party	V	180	534	698	166	303	5,323	259	1,047	223	657	367	834	692	11,283	4.91%	1	0	1
Liberals	L	152	494	566	187	327	4,186	127	671	166	489	316	798	617	9,096	3.96%	0	1	1
Green Party	MP	105	357	399	108	260	3,749	193	556	117	380	233	566	378	7,401	3.22%	0	1	1
Alternative for Sweden	AfS	19	30	32	14	25	228	13	67	23	45	30	70	53	649	0.28%	0	0	0
Feminist Initiative	FI	9	25	27	9	15	328	8	63	9	25	15	33	37	603	0.26%	0	0	0
Citizens' Coalition	MED	7	28	30	8	7	144	9	29	2	22	14	28	15	343	0.15%	0	0	0
Christian Values Party	KrVP	16	12	2	7	12	110	9	24	14	24	20	40	9	299	0.13%	0	0	0
Pirate Party	PP	1	29	9	3	2	61	15	17	2	24	4	11	16	194	0.08%	0	0	0
Independent Rural Party	LPo	7	26	18	2	13	31	7	25	9	2	2	17	27	186	0.08%	0	0	0
Unity	ENH	9	8	6	3	8	60	7	10	2	7	8	10	10	148	0.06%	0	0	0
Direct Democrats	DD	2	8	8	3	3	62	3	14	3	7	8	15	6	142	0.06%	0	0	0
Nordic Resistance Movement	NMR	4	5	7	0	1	12	0	11	1	3	2	2	7	55	0.02%	0	0	0
Classical Liberal Party	KLP	1	0	1	0	1	31	0	3	1	1	2	2	4	47	0.02%	0	0	0
Animal Party	DjuP	0	2	2	0	0	16	0	3	0	7	1	2	3	36	0.02%	0	0	0
Basic Income Party	BASIP	1	0	0	0	1	4	6	0	0	4	0	1	0	17	0.01%	0	0	0
Communist Party of Sweden	SKP	0	0	1	0	0	0	0	0	0	0	2	0	1	4	0.00%	0	0	0
Initiative	INI	0	0	0	0	0	1	0	0	0	0	0	1	0	2	0.00%	0	0	0
European Workers Party	EAP	0	0	1	0	0	0	0	0	0	0	0	0	0	1	0.00%	0	0	0
Parties not on the ballot		1	0	2	0	0	5	0	2	0	0	1	0	2	13	0.01%	0	0	0
Valid votes		4,485	11,294	17,752	5,855	7,746	90,129	4,823	19,397	7,028	12,279	8,813	22,268	17,711	229,580	100.00%	11	2	13
Blank votes		38	138	174	51	69	662	48	170	68	104	79	196	159	1,956	0.84%			
Rejected votes – unregistered parties		0	1	11	0	5	17	1	3	0	3	2	3	4	50	0.02%			
Rejected votes – other		0	4	7	3	5	38	0	3	3	4	2	13	4	86	0.04%			
Total polled		4,523	11,437	17,944	5,909	7,825	90,846	4,872	19,573	7,099	12,390	8,896	22,480	17,878	231,672	88.09%			
Registered electors		5,029	12,932	21,068	6,871	8,382	102,880	5,440	22,254	8,117	13,999	10,108	25,634	20,267	262,981				
Turnout		89.94%	88.44%	85.17%	86.00%	93.35%	88.30%	89.56%	87.95%	87.46%	88.51%	88.01%	87.70%	88.21%	88.09%				

The following candidates were elected:

- Constituency seats (personal mandates) - Jimmie Åkesson (SD), 15,535 votes; Andreas Carlson (KD), 1,843 votes; Mats Green (M), 3,148 votes; Annie Lööf (C), 7,132 votes; and Ciczie Weidby (V), 672 votes.
- Constituency seats (party mandates) - Acko Ankarberg Johansson (KD), 259 votes; Helena Bouveng (M), 1,443 votes; Johanna Haraldsson (S), 1,725 votes; Angelica Lundberg (SD), 184 votes; Carina Ödebrink (S), 2,110 votes; and Peter Persson (S), 2,385 votes.
- Levelling seats (personal mandates) - Emma Carlsson Löfdahl (L), 614 votes; and Emma Hult (MP), 504 votes.

Permanent substitutions:

- Peter Persson (S) resigned on 31 August 2020 and was replaced by Thomas Strand (S) on 1 September 2020.
- Thomas Strand (S) resigned on 1 September 2020 and was replaced by Diana Laitinen Carlsson (S) on the same day.
- Emma Carlsson Löfdahl (L) resigned on 31 July 2021 and was replaced by Jakob Olofsgård (L) on 1 August 2021.

===== 2014 =====
Results of the 2014 general election held on 14 September 2014:

Party		Votes per municipality													Total votes	%	Seats		
Party		Aneby	Eksjö	Gisla- ved	Gnosjö	Habo	Jönkö- ping	Mullsjö	Nässjö	Sävsjö	Tranås	Vagge- ryd	Värn- amo	Vet- landa	Total votes	%	Con.	Lev.	Tot.
Swedish Social Democratic Party	S	1,288	3,439	6,427	1,757	2,007	26,475	1,357	6,502	1,919	4,441	2,921	7,373	5,581	71,487	31.83%	4	0	4
Moderate Party	M	744	2,282	3,973	1,196	1,644	19,020	793	3,203	1,248	2,332	1,521	4,449	3,189	45,594	20.30%	3	0	3
Sweden Democrats	SD	731	1,477	2,888	916	1,119	10,891	761	3,713	1,310	1,905	1,319	2,927	2,858	32,815	14.61%	2	0	2
Christian Democrats	KD	599	958	975	822	974	9,645	809	1,767	1,067	944	1,013	2,134	1,615	23,322	10.38%	1	0	1
Centre Party	C	543	1,252	1,826	491	472	5,040	241	1,350	806	793	683	2,383	1,920	17,800	7.93%	1	0	1
Green Party	MP	213	603	665	197	393	5,932	284	989	184	680	346	901	708	12,095	5.39%	0	1	1
Left Party	V	114	381	555	150	231	3,996	230	794	189	488	298	652	607	8,685	3.87%	0	0	0
Liberal People's Party	FP	129	475	583	169	270	3,626	161	543	159	461	261	644	609	8,090	3.60%	0	1	1
Feminist Initiative	FI	36	176	146	48	82	1,619	68	228	55	191	83	223	199	3,154	1.40%	0	0	0
Pirate Party	PP	9	40	63	16	17	238	21	58	11	24	19	63	50	629	0.28%	0	0	0
Christian Values Party	KrVP	15	20	3	1	20	114	8	21	26	13	10	26	31	308	0.14%	0	0	0
Party of the Swedes	SVP	2	4	10	0	1	54	4	8	4	11	27	27	8	160	0.07%	0	0	0
Unity	ENH	2	15	6	1	7	65	8	10	2	12	12	7	7	154	0.07%	0	0	0
Independent Rural Party	LPo	0	11	9	2	14	12	1	10	7	6	5	7	6	90	0.04%	0	0	0
Animal Party	DjuP	0	3	4	2	2	29	2	6	0	4	1	4	3	60	0.03%	0	0	0
Direct Democrats	DD	0	3	3	0	0	12	0	7	0	0	2	1	2	30	0.01%	0	0	0
Classical Liberal Party	KLP	0	0	2	0	0	15	0	2	1	0	0	0	4	24	0.01%	0	0	0
Health Party		0	1	2	0	0	2	0	0	0	1	2	0	1	9	0.00%	0	0	0
Progressive Party		0	0	0	0	0	8	1	0	0	0	0	0	0	9	0.00%	0	0	0
Socialist Justice Party	RS	0	0	0	0	0	3	0	0	0	0	2	0	0	5	0.00%	0	0	0
Communist Party of Sweden	SKP	0	0	2	0	0	1	0	1	0	0	0	0	0	4	0.00%	0	0	0
Swedish Senior Citizen Interest Party	SPI	0	0	1	0	0	1	0	0	1	0	0	1	0	4	0.00%	0	0	0
Parties not on the ballot		0	3	9	2	1	31	3	6	4	2	0	2	5	68	0.03%	0	0	0
Valid votes		4,425	11,143	18,152	5,770	7,254	86,829	4,752	19,218	6,993	12,308	8,525	21,824	17,403	224,596	100.00%	11	2	13
Blank votes		44	118	208	64	95	747	52	178	60	106	86	204	174	2,136	0.94%			
Rejected votes – other		0	5	4	6	5	31	2	5	1	4	2	6	2	73	0.03%			
Total polled		4,469	11,266	18,364	5,840	7,354	87,607	4,806	19,401	7,054	12,418	8,613	22,034	17,579	226,805	87.02%			
Registered electors		5,017	12,948	21,569	6,865	8,025	100,590	5,388	22,272	8,124	14,214	9,900	25,384	20,337	260,633				
Turnout		89.08%	87.01%	85.14%	85.07%	91.64%	87.09%	89.20%	87.11%	86.83%	87.36%	87.00%	86.80%	86.44%	87.02%				

The following candidates were elected:

- Constituency seats (personal mandates) - Jimmie Åkesson (SD), 10,803 votes; Helena Bouveng (M), 2,285 votes; Andreas Carlson (KD), 2,445 votes; Mats Green (M), 3,690 votes; Annie Lööf (C), 4,670 votes; and Peter Persson (S), 4,094 votes.
- Constituency seats (party mandates) - Sotiris Delis (M), 744 votes; Dennis Dioukarev (SD), 5 votes; Johanna Haraldsson (S), 1,680 votes; Helene Petersson (S), 2,728 votes; and Thomas Strand (S), 1,320 votes.
- Levelling seats (personal mandates) - Emma Carlsson Löfdahl (FP), 471 votes; and Emma Hult (MP), 869 votes.

===== 2010 =====
Results of the 2010 general election held on 19 September 2010:

Party		Votes per municipality													Total votes	%	Seats		
Party		Aneby	Eksjö	Gisla- ved	Gnosjö	Habo	Jönkö- ping	Mullsjö	Nässjö	Sävsjö	Tranås	Vagge- ryd	Värn- amo	Vet- landa	Total votes	%	Con.	Lev.	Tot.
Swedish Social Democratic Party	S	1,129	2,982	6,142	1,712	1,873	24,397	1,283	6,454	1,770	4,110	2,733	6,601	5,130	66,316	30.62%	4	0	4
Moderate Party	M	958	3,080	5,066	1,464	2,104	23,040	1,181	4,526	1,752	3,171	2,015	5,279	4,265	57,901	26.74%	3	0	3
Christian Democrats	KD	749	1,208	1,357	1,105	1,135	11,190	869	2,073	1,238	1,134	1,212	2,638	1,914	27,822	12.85%	2	0	2
Centre Party	C	522	1,196	1,741	454	381	4,366	229	1,314	862	762	643	2,465	1,924	16,859	7.78%	1	0	1
Sweden Democrats	SD	323	623	1,286	404	426	4,583	280	1,445	647	753	610	1,394	1,114	13,888	6.41%	1	0	1
Liberal People's Party	FP	214	640	950	279	419	5,239	238	920	309	634	361	995	936	12,134	5.60%	0	1	1
Green Party	MP	195	563	700	165	358	5,301	268	977	196	742	293	913	767	11,438	5.28%	0	1	1
Left Party	V	127	387	515	156	215	3,948	223	940	209	458	268	604	725	8,775	4.05%	0	0	0
Pirate Party	PP	13	44	77	33	20	408	29	88	15	40	42	75	81	965	0.45%	0	0	0
Feminist Initiative	FI	2	21	12	5	4	146	4	36	3	12	6	15	14	280	0.13%	0	0	0
Unity	ENH	1	3	0	0	5	9	3	6	0	1	4	0	0	32	0.01%	0	0	0
Party of the Swedes	SVP	0	0	0	1	0	5	0	0	0	3	4	14	0	27	0.01%	0	0	0
National Democrats	ND	0	1	0	0	0	11	0	0	0	2	2	1	3	20	0.01%	0	0	0
Freedom Party		0	0	0	1	3	11	4	0	0	0	0	0	0	19	0.01%	0	0	0
Swedish Senior Citizen Interest Party	SPI	0	1	4	4	0	3	0	0	1	0	0	1	0	14	0.01%	0	0	0
Spirits Party		1	0	4	0	0	4	0	3	0	0	0	0	1	13	0.01%	0	0	0
Rural Democrats		4	0	4	0	0	0	0	0	0	0	0	2	0	10	0.00%	0	0	0
Classical Liberal Party	KLP	0	0	0	0	0	5	0	1	0	0	0	0	1	7	0.00%	0	0	0
Socialist Justice Party	RS	0	0	0	0	0	5	0	0	0	0	0	0	2	7	0.00%	0	0	0
European Workers Party	EAP	0	0	0	0	0	2	0	0	0	0	0	0	0	2	0.00%	0	0	0
Communist Party of Sweden	SKP	0	0	0	0	0	1	0	0	0	0	0	0	0	1	0.00%	0	0	0
Parties not on the ballot		3	2	3	0	0	11	3	2	0	1	2	4	3	34	0.02%	0	0	0
Valid votes		4,241	10,751	17,861	5,783	6,943	82,685	4,614	18,785	7,002	11,823	8,195	21,001	16,880	216,564	100.00%	11	2	13
Blank votes		59	157	240	88	96	907	49	246	73	126	87	225	190	2,543	1.16%			
Rejected votes – other		1	2	15	4	1	39	2	11	2	5	1	7	4	94	0.04%			
Total polled		4,301	10,910	18,116	5,875	7,040	83,631	4,665	19,042	7,077	11,954	8,283	21,233	17,074	219,201	85.45%			
Registered electors		4,996	12,873	21,714	6,974	7,815	97,346	5,308	22,347	8,206	14,055	9,706	24,997	20,201	256,538				
Turnout		86.09%	84.75%	83.43%	84.24%	90.08%	85.91%	87.89%	85.21%	86.24%	85.05%	85.34%	84.94%	84.52%	85.45%				

The following candidates were elected:

- Constituency seats (personal mandates) - Jimmie Åkesson (SD), 4,076 votes; Annie Johansson (C), 4,919 votes; Maria Larsson (KD), 4,962 votes; and Peter Persson (S), 5,496 votes.
- Constituency seats (party mandates) - Magdalena Andersson (M), 2,099 votes; Stefan Attefall (KD), 1,198 votes; Helena Bouveng (M), 4,533 votes; Carina Hägg (S), 3,501 votes; Bengt-Anders Johansson (M), 2,122 votes; Helene Petersson (S), 2,469 votes; and Thomas Strand (S), 1,079 votes.
- Levelling seats (personal mandates) - Tobias Krantz (FP), 1,172 votes.
- Levelling seats (party mandates) - Kew Nordqvist (MP), 479 votes.

Permanent substitutions:

- Tobias Krantz (FP) resigned on 6 October 2010 and was replaced by Emma Carlsson Löfdahl (FP) on the same day.
- Magdalena Andersson (M) resigned on 31 October 2012 and was replaced by Peter Jutterström (M) on 1 November 2012.

==== 2000s ====
===== 2006 =====
Results of the 2006 general election held on 17 September 2006:

Party		Votes per municipality													Total votes	%	Seats		
Party		Aneby	Eksjö	Gisla- ved	Gnosjö	Habo	Jönkö- ping	Mullsjö	Nässjö	Sävsjö	Tranås	Vagge- ryd	Värn- amo	Vet- landa	Total votes	%	Con.	Lev.	Tot.
Swedish Social Democratic Party	S	1,310	3,390	6,243	1,764	1,982	26,602	1,454	7,516	2,068	4,461	2,907	7,184	5,876	72,757	35.44%	5	0	5
Moderate Party	M	733	2,476	4,251	1,195	1,550	17,624	933	3,532	1,385	2,443	1,542	4,418	3,220	45,302	22.07%	3	0	3
Christian Democrats	KD	916	1,440	1,694	1,395	1,214	13,076	883	2,578	1,422	1,388	1,484	3,098	2,358	32,946	16.05%	2	0	2
Centre Party	C	543	1,266	1,787	420	436	4,472	320	1,471	910	763	651	2,118	2,133	17,290	8.42%	1	0	1
Liberal People's Party	FP	205	582	920	224	349	4,618	222	763	257	593	357	995	897	10,982	5.35%	0	1	1
Left Party	V	132	379	529	140	213	3,835	213	989	208	509	271	595	721	8,734	4.25%	0	1	1
Green Party	MP	118	384	451	126	201	3,149	182	640	123	422	192	551	531	7,070	3.44%	0	0	0
Sweden Democrats	SD	136	294	781	204	210	2,020	134	582	324	322	297	769	441	6,514	3.17%	0	0	0
June List		16	41	101	38	45	487	57	91	42	71	36	73	81	1,179	0.57%	0	0	0
Pirate Party	PP	20	47	90	31	10	398	34	86	14	66	27	88	42	953	0.46%	0	0	0
Feminist Initiative	FI	17	27	45	3	19	295	4	46	10	32	6	22	34	560	0.27%	0	0	0
Swedish Senior Citizen Interest Party	SPI	5	17	59	16	11	173	14	41	21	24	7	28	30	446	0.22%	0	0	0
Unity	ENH	5	17	4	0	3	66	4	29	4	1	5	7	8	153	0.07%	0	0	0
New Future	NYF	1	11	9	0	2	21	9	6	1	0	1	5	2	68	0.03%	0	0	0
National Socialist Front		0	0	3	6	1	7	0	4	1	3	3	9	1	38	0.02%	0	0	0
Health Care Party	Sjvåp	1	2	0	3	0	2	0	5	0	2	0	18	3	36	0.02%	0	0	0
National Democrats	ND	1	3	0	1	0	8	0	0	3	0	0	1	2	19	0.01%	0	0	0
People's Will		0	1	0	0	2	5	0	0	0	1	1	4	1	15	0.01%	0	0	0
Kvinnokraft		0	0	0	0	0	6	0	4	1	1	0	0	0	12	0.01%	0	0	0
Classical Liberal Party	KLP	0	0	0	1	0	5	0	1	0	0	0	0	0	7	0.00%	0	0	0
The Communists	KOMM	0	0	0	0	0	5	0	0	0	0	0	0	0	5	0.00%	0	0	0
Nordic Union		0	0	0	0	1	0	0	0	0	0	0	1	1	3	0.00%	0	0	0
Unique Party		0	0	0	0	0	2	0	0	0	0	0	0	0	2	0.00%	0	0	0
Socialist Justice Party	RS	0	0	0	0	0	0	0	0	0	1	0	0	0	1	0.00%	0	0	0
Other parties		1	1	22	0	2	165	1	5	1	2	2	3	3	208	0.10%	0	0	0
Valid votes		4,160	10,378	16,989	5,567	6,251	77,041	4,464	18,389	6,795	11,105	7,789	19,987	16,385	205,300	100.00%	11	2	13
Blank votes		77	193	298	82	144	1,358	73	368	132	185	128	344	301	3,683	1.76%			
Rejected votes – other		1	2	4	2	6	18	4	11	1	5	2	5	26	87	0.04%			
Total polled		4,238	10,573	17,291	5,651	6,401	78,417	4,541	18,768	6,928	11,295	7,919	20,336	16,712	209,070	83.40%			
Registered electors		5,009	12,859	21,419	6,926	7,300	93,173	5,277	22,468	8,230	13,744	9,497	24,576	20,206	250,684				
Turnout		84.61%	82.22%	80.73%	81.59%	87.68%	84.16%	86.05%	83.53%	84.18%	82.18%	83.38%	82.75%	82.71%	83.40%				

The following candidates were elected:

- Constituency seats (personal mandates) - Annie Johansson (C), 2,296 votes; and Maria Larsson (KD), 6,530 votes.
- Constituency seats (party mandates) - Magdalena Andersson (M), 1,578 votes; Stefan Attefall (KD), 636 votes; Helena Bouveng (M), 1,770 votes; Carina Hägg (S), 3,556 votes; Bengt-Anders Johansson (M), 2,797 votes; Margareta Persson (S), 2,872 votes; Helene Petersson (S), 1,319 votes; Thomas Strand (S), 1,243 votes; and Göte Wahlström (S), 906 votes.
- Levelling seats (personal mandates) - Alice Åström (V), 766 votes; and Tobias Krantz (FP), 995 votes.

===== 2002 =====
Results of the 2002 general election held on 15 September 2002:

Party		Votes per municipality													Total votes	%	Seats		
Party		Aneby	Eksjö	Gisla- ved	Gnosjö	Habo	Jönkö- ping	Mullsjö	Nässjö	Sävsjö	Tranås	Vagge- ryd	Värn- amo	Vet- landa	Total votes	%	Con.	Lev.	Tot.
Swedish Social Democratic Party	S	1,402	3,897	6,952	1,918	2,039	28,982	1,501	7,917	2,175	4,831	3,070	7,744	6,242	78,670	39.54%	5	0	5
Christian Democrats	KD	1,152	2,038	2,475	1,708	1,343	14,491	1,090	3,224	1,705	1,963	1,882	4,029	3,216	40,316	20.26%	2	1	3
Moderate Party	M	374	1,383	2,363	717	843	9,658	512	2,095	862	1,431	813	2,380	1,836	25,267	12.70%	2	0	2
Liberal People's Party	FP	300	944	1,500	420	534	7,776	341	1,301	401	938	500	1,702	1,321	17,978	9.03%	1	0	1
Centre Party	C	471	1,193	1,771	370	347	3,012	227	1,352	905	613	565	1,691	1,993	14,510	7.29%	1	0	1
Left Party	V	174	512	795	200	289	4,731	300	1,339	298	683	379	763	954	11,417	5.74%	0	1	1
Green Party	MP	120	378	455	108	165	2,648	181	606	146	381	198	528	486	6,400	3.22%	0	0	0
Sweden Democrats	SD	23	82	254	85	20	735	36	166	91	47	75	254	126	1,994	1.00%	0	0	0
Swedish Senior Citizen Interest Party	SPI	10	39	35	3	26	383	13	50	64	36	14	26	43	742	0.37%	0	0	0
New Future	NYF	18	37	64	25	29	153	19	57	14	59	44	99	69	687	0.35%	0	0	0
Socialist Party	SOC.P	19	3	57	10	13	291	18	77	2	23	24	32	17	586	0.29%	0	0	0
Unity	ENH	1	5	0	0	1	3	0	4	0	0	3	1	1	19	0.01%	0	0	0
The Communists	KOMM	0	0	1	6	0	7	0	0	0	0	0	0	0	14	0.01%	0	0	0
Norrbotten Party	NBP	0	1	6	0	0	3	0	0	0	0	0	2	0	12	0.01%	0	0	0
European Workers Party	EAP	0	0	0	0	0	0	1	0	0	0	0	2	0	3	0.00%	0	0	0
Rikshushållarna		0	0	0	0	0	1	1	0	0	0	0	0	0	2	0.00%	0	0	0
Socialist Justice Party	RS	0	0	0	0	0	1	0	0	0	0	0	0	0	1	0.00%	0	0	0
Other parties		10	4	53	7	21	101	16	31	8	30	17	40	26	364	0.18%	0	0	0
Valid votes		4,074	10,516	16,781	5,577	5,670	72,976	4,256	18,219	6,671	11,035	7,584	19,293	16,330	198,982	100.00%	11	2	13
Rejected votes		46	148	259	65	131	1,084	80	274	84	125	91	251	217	2,855	1.41%			
Total polled		4,120	10,664	17,040	5,642	5,801	74,060	4,336	18,493	6,755	11,160	7,675	19,544	16,547	201,837	82.17%			
Registered electors		4,917	12,983	21,355	6,999	6,881	89,643	5,232	22,297	8,268	13,695	9,235	23,934	20,209	245,648				
Turnout		83.79%	82.14%	79.79%	80.61%	84.30%	82.62%	82.87%	82.94%	81.70%	81.49%	83.11%	81.66%	81.88%	82.17%				

The following candidates were elected:

- Constituency seats (personal mandates) - Margareta Andersson (C), 1,696 votes; Anders Björck (M), 5,488 votes; Tobias Krantz (FP), 1,604 votes; and Alf Svensson (KD), 14,165 votes.
- Constituency seats (party mandates) - Lars Engqvist (S), 5,198 votes; Carina Hägg (S), 3,785 votes; Bengt-Anders Johansson (M), 2,797 votes; 808 votes; Maria Larsson (KD), 1,517 votes; Martin Nilsson (S), 2,125 votes; Margareta Sandgren (S), 2,306 votes; and Göte Wahlström (S), 834 votes.
- Levelling seats (personal mandates) - Alice Åström (V), 962 votes.
- Levelling seats (party mandates) - Göran Hägglund (KD), 345 votes.

Permanent substitutions:

- Anders Björck (M) resigned on 31 December 2002 and was replaced by Magdalena Andersson (M) on 1 January 2003.
- Lars Engqvist (S) resigned on 30 September 2004 and was replaced by Helene Petersson (S) on 1 October 2004.

==== 1990s ====
===== 1998 =====
Results of the 1998 general election held on 20 September 1998:

Party		Votes per municipality													Total votes	%	Seats		
Party		Aneby	Eksjö	Gisla- ved	Gnosjö	Habo	Jönkö- ping	Mullsjö	Nässjö	Sävsjö	Tranås	Vagge- ryd	Värn- amo	Vet- landa	Total votes	%	Con.	Lev.	Tot.
Swedish Social Democratic Party	S	1,171	3,354	6,334	1,633	1,788	24,948	1,316	7,200	2,007	4,180	2,705	6,675	5,462	68,773	34.43%	5	0	5
Christian Democrats	KD	1,271	2,314	2,782	1,736	1,504	16,157	1,189	3,779	1,972	2,356	2,027	4,518	3,857	45,462	22.76%	3	0	3
Moderate Party	M	612	2,014	3,437	1,078	1,199	13,686	773	3,066	1,178	2,187	1,220	3,648	2,722	36,820	18.43%	2	0	2
Left Party	V	288	873	1,243	315	441	6,863	464	1,997	496	1,101	677	1,154	1,621	17,533	8.78%	1	0	1
Centre Party	C	432	1,185	1,637	354	333	2,657	198	1,276	849	550	561	1,488	1,845	13,365	6.69%	1	0	1
Green Party	MP	172	454	629	159	211	2,649	211	637	223	394	203	643	660	7,245	3.63%	0	1	1
Liberal People's Party	FP	119	340	553	160	150	2,628	96	545	176	317	220	584	521	6,409	3.21%	0	0	0
Other parties		84	217	318	123	115	1,782	107	298	120	126	151	454	248	4,143	2.07%	0	0	0
Valid votes		4,149	10,751	16,933	5,558	5,741	71,370	4,354	18,798	7,021	11,211	7,764	19,164	16,936	199,750	100.00%	12	1	13
Rejected votes		67	199	412	97	151	1,444	100	385	74	215	88	390	265	3,887	1.91%			
Total polled		4,216	10,950	17,345	5,655	5,892	72,814	4,454	19,183	7,095	11,426	7,852	19,554	17,201	203,637	83.70%			
Registered electors		4,964	13,192	21,153	6,849	6,865	86,855	5,228	22,707	8,600	13,808	9,160	23,341	20,584	243,306				
Turnout		84.93%	83.00%	82.00%	82.57%	85.83%	83.83%	85.20%	84.48%	82.50%	82.75%	85.72%	83.78%	83.56%	83.70%				

The following candidates were elected:

- Constituency seats (personal mandates) - Alice Åström (V), 1,642 votes; Margareta Andersson (C), 2,001 votes; Anders Björck (M), 7,397 votes; and Alf Svensson (KD), 18,479 votes.
- Constituency seats (party mandates) - Åke Gustavsson (S), 3,763 votes; Carina Hägg (S), 2,704 votes; Göran Hägglund (KD), 307 votes; Göte Jonsson (M), 1,751 votes; Maria Larsson (KD), 1,069 votes; Martin Nilsson (S), 1,835 votes; Margareta Sandgren (S), 2,702 votes; and Göte Wahlström (S), 1,402 votes.
- Levelling seats (personal mandates) - Marianne Samuelsson (MP), 707 votes.

===== 1994 =====
Results of the 1994 general election held on 18 September 1994:

Party		Votes per municipality											Total votes	%	Seats		
Party		Aneby	Eksjö	Gisla- ved	Gnosjö	Jönkö- ping	Nässjö	Sävsjö	Tranås	Vagge- ryd	Värn- amo	Vet- landa	Total votes	%	Con.	Lev.	Tot.
Swedish Social Democratic Party	S	1,581	4,404	7,806	2,095	31,952	9,483	2,433	5,551	3,293	8,153	7,119	83,870	41.78%	5	0	5
Moderate Party	M	764	2,456	3,756	1,338	15,270	3,560	1,510	2,391	1,545	4,096	3,261	39,947	19.90%	3	0	3
Centre Party	C	760	1,846	2,500	661	4,968	2,164	1,373	1,029	929	2,507	2,900	21,637	10.78%	1	0	1
Christian Democratic Unity	KDS	756	1,076	1,167	955	7,938	1,754	1,164	1,117	1,097	2,480	2,045	21,549	10.73%	1	1	2
Liberal People's Party	FP	227	658	1,146	323	5,361	1,108	312	708	399	1,267	972	12,481	6.22%	1	0	1
Left Party	V	125	427	522	172	3,745	1,006	334	492	421	643	883	8,770	4.37%	0	1	1
Green Party	MP	189	620	794	189	3,010	867	260	537	299	884	720	8,369	4.17%	0	1	1
New Democracy	NyD	40	103	139	67	846	208	68	124	49	171	230	2,045	1.02%	0	0	0
Other parties		48	127	152	89	776	233	79	133	73	232	154	2,096	1.04%	0	0	0
Valid votes		4,490	11,717	17,982	5,889	73,866	20,383	7,533	12,082	8,105	20,433	18,284	200,764	100.00%	11	3	14
Rejected votes		55	137	315	83	1,184	273	84	145	60	265	222	2,823	1.39%			
Total polled		4,545	11,854	18,297	5,972	75,050	20,656	7,617	12,227	8,165	20,698	18,506	203,587	88.34%			
Registered electors		5,108	13,571	20,754	6,677	84,968	23,245	8,849	13,895	9,118	23,203	21,058	230,446				
Turnout		88.98%	87.35%	88.16%	89.44%	88.33%	88.86%	86.08%	88.00%	89.55%	89.20%	87.88%	88.34%				

The following candidates were elected: Alice Åström (V); Rune Backlund (C); Anders Björck (M); Åke Gustavsson (S); Göran Hägglund (KDS); Göte Jonsson (M); Ronny Korsberg (MP); Allan Larsson (S); Ulf Melin (M); Martin Nilsson (S); Catarina Rönnung (S); Margareta Sandgren (S); Alf Svensson (KDS); and Carl-Johan Wilson (FP).

Permanent substitutions:

- Allan Larsson (S) resigned on 14 May 1995 and was replaced by Carina Hägg (S) on 14 May 1995.
- Rune Backlund (C) resigned on 29 September 1995 and was replaced by Margareta Andersson (C) on 30 September 1995.

===== 1991 =====
Results of the 1991 general election held on 15 September 1991:

Party		Votes per municipality											Total votes	%	Seats		
Party		Aneby	Eksjö	Gisla- ved	Gnosjö	Jönkö- ping	Nässjö	Sävsjö	Tranås	Vagge- ryd	Värn- amo	Vet- landa	Total votes	%	Con.	Lev.	Tot.
Swedish Social Democratic Party	S	1,232	3,534	6,280	1,744	26,697	8,162	1,979	4,745	2,872	6,772	5,806	69,823	34.84%	5	0	5
Moderate Party	M	680	2,363	3,406	1,135	14,666	3,431	1,458	2,240	1,282	3,920	3,099	37,680	18.80%	2	0	2
Christian Democratic Unity	KDS	1,096	1,843	1,938	1,312	12,519	3,093	1,687	1,730	1,682	3,531	3,206	33,637	16.79%	2	0	2
Centre Party	C	753	1,944	2,686	610	4,805	2,358	1,355	1,022	920	2,532	3,047	22,032	10.99%	1	0	1
Liberal People's Party	FP	266	881	1,482	435	5,972	1,338	394	794	472	1,538	1,184	14,756	7.36%	1	0	1
New Democracy	NyD	305	634	1,032	394	3,448	1,005	425	705	362	952	1,116	10,378	5.18%	0	1	1
Left Party	V	70	260	378	111	2,402	680	171	366	293	447	421	5,599	2.79%	0	0	0
Green Party	MP	125	325	371	71	2,008	559	135	270	143	504	440	4,951	2.47%	0	0	0
Other parties		17	56	111	61	679	149	47	119	48	127	123	1,537	0.77%	0	0	0
Valid votes		4,544	11,840	17,684	5,873	73,196	20,775	7,651	11,991	8,074	20,323	18,442	200,393	100.00%	11	1	12
Rejected votes		42	185	364	65	1,213	304	78	158	79	278	235	3,001	1.48%			
Total polled		4,586	12,025	18,048	5,938	74,409	21,079	7,729	12,149	8,153	20,601	18,677	203,394	88.64%			
Registered electors		5,127	13,732	20,407	6,626	83,684	23,658	8,886	13,870	9,043	23,190	21,243	229,466				
Turnout		89.45%	87.57%	88.44%	89.62%	88.92%	89.10%	86.98%	87.59%	90.16%	88.84%	87.92%	88.64%				

The following candidates were elected: Rune Backlund (C); Anders Björck (M); Ingegerd Elm (S); Åke Gustavsson (S); Göran Hägglund (KDS); Göte Jonsson (M); Allan Larsson (S); Nils Nordh (S); Catarina Rönnung (S); Alf Svensson (KDS); Richard Ulfvengren (NyD); and Carl-Johan Wilson (FP).

Permanent substitutions:

- Ingegerd Elm (S) died on 20 January 1992 and was replaced by Martin Nilsson (S) on 23 January 1992.

==== 1980s ====
===== 1988 =====
Results of the 1988 general election held on 18 September 1988:

Party		Votes per municipality											Total votes	%	Seats		
Party		Aneby	Eksjö	Gisla- ved	Gnosjö	Jönkö- ping	Nässjö	Sävsjö	Tranås	Vagge- ryd	Värn- amo	Vet- landa	Total votes	%	Con.	Lev.	Tot.
Swedish Social Democratic Party	S	1,349	3,957	7,069	1,957	30,327	9,411	2,193	5,387	3,188	7,657	6,473	78,968	39.97%	5	0	5
Moderate Party	M	632	2,041	2,867	988	12,027	2,955	1,347	1,957	1,167	3,272	2,751	32,004	16.20%	2	0	2
Centre Party	C	1,045	2,399	3,413	795	6,479	3,154	1,808	1,335	1,205	3,142	3,937	28,712	14.53%	2	0	2
Liberal People's Party	FP	448	1,355	2,046	769	8,788	1,999	668	1,285	707	2,270	1,746	22,081	11.18%	2	0	2
Christian Democratic Unity	KDS	689	1,049	973	823	7,904	1,889	1,038	1,139	1,076	2,272	2,001	20,853	10.56%	0	0	0
Green Party	MP	181	533	659	191	2,922	620	257	467	195	769	713	7,507	3.80%	0	0	0
Left Party – Communists	VPK	91	322	475	185	2,932	689	149	408	320	575	513	6,659	3.37%	0	0	0
Other parties		4	13	34	11	480	49	18	17	15	105	25	771	0.39%	0	0	0
Valid votes		4,439	11,669	17,536	5,719	71,859	20,766	7,478	11,995	7,873	20,062	18,159	197,555	100.00%	11	0	11
Rejected votes		25	98	216	55	783	161	43	155	60	177	149	1,922	0.96%			
Total polled		4,464	11,767	17,752	5,774	72,642	20,927	7,521	12,150	7,933	20,239	18,308	199,477	87.86%			
Registered electors		5,022	13,623	20,221	6,513	82,519	23,625	8,615	13,920	8,825	23,024	21,138	227,045				
Turnout		88.89%	86.38%	87.79%	88.65%	88.03%	88.58%	87.30%	87.28%	89.89%	87.90%	86.61%	87.86%				

The following candidates were elected: Sven-Erik Alkemark (S); Rune Backlund (C); Anders Björck (M); Ingegerd Elm (S); Åke Gustavsson (S); Kersti Johansson (C); Per-Anders Johansson (M); Nils Nordh (S); Ingrid Ronne-Björkqvist (FP); Catarina Rönnung (S); and Carl-Johan Wilson (FP).

Permanent substitutions:

- Sven-Erik Alkemark (S) died on 16 February 1990 and was replaced by Marianne Andersson (S) on 20 February 1990.

===== 1985 =====
Results of the 1985 general election held on 15 September 1985:

Party		Votes per municipality											Total votes	%	Seats		
Party		Aneby	Eksjö	Gisla- ved	Gnosjö	Jönkö- ping	Nässjö	Sävsjö	Tranås	Vagge- ryd	Värn- amo	Vet- landa	Total votes	%	Con.	Lev.	Tot.
Swedish Social Democratic Party	S	1,360	4,195	7,133	1,923	31,949	9,852	2,223	5,648	3,245	7,854	6,711	82,093	40.25%	5	0	5
Centre Party	C	1,622	3,229	4,107	1,467	11,892	4,489	2,617	2,154	2,109	4,876	5,645	44,207	21.67%	2	1	3
Moderate Party	M	859	2,538	3,570	1,209	14,778	3,643	1,712	2,469	1,384	4,068	3,416	39,646	19.44%	2	1	3
Liberal People's Party	FP	648	1,841	2,497	911	11,038	2,826	1,068	1,912	1,027	2,817	2,506	29,091	14.26%	2	0	2
Left Party – Communists	VPK	78	283	432	155	2,784	701	115	353	306	563	520	6,290	3.08%	0	0	0
Green Party	MP	63	181	221	38	686	222	52	121	64	267	199	2,114	1.04%	0	0	0
Other parties		8	10	33	11	294	39	21	27	5	63	27	538	0.26%	0	0	0
Valid votes		4,638	12,277	17,993	5,714	73,421	21,772	7,808	12,684	8,140	20,508	19,024	203,979	100.00%	11	2	13
Rejected votes		16	80	167	34	508	138	39	68	41	137	118	1,346	0.66%			
Total polled		4,654	12,357	18,160	5,748	73,929	21,910	7,847	12,752	8,181	20,645	19,142	205,325	91.14%			
Registered electors		5,067	13,718	19,951	6,243	81,125	23,813	8,705	14,057	8,862	22,578	21,173	225,292				
Turnout		91.85%	90.08%	91.02%	92.07%	91.13%	92.01%	90.14%	90.72%	92.32%	91.44%	90.41%	91.14%				

The following candidates were elected: Rune Backlund (C); Anders Björck (M); Anita Bråkenhielm (M); Ingegerd Elm (S); Åke Gustavsson (S); Kersti Johansson (C); Göte Jonsson (M); Helge Klöver (S); Nils Nordh (S); Ingrid Ronne-Björkqvist (FP); Catarina Rönnung (S); Alf Svensson (C); and Carl-Johan Wilson (FP).

===== 1982 =====
Results of the 1982 general election held on 19 September 1982:

Party		Votes per municipality											Total votes	%	Seats		
Party		Aneby	Eksjö	Gisla- ved	Gnosjö	Jönkö- ping	Nässjö	Sävsjö	Tranås	Vagge- ryd	Värn- amo	Vet- landa	Total votes	%	Con.	Lev.	Tot.
Swedish Social Democratic Party	S	1,371	4,224	7,057	1,819	32,144	9,955	2,168	5,586	3,188	7,650	6,826	81,988	40.12%	5	0	5
Moderate Party	M	1,023	2,962	3,895	1,335	17,482	4,248	1,888	2,899	1,606	4,699	3,927	45,964	22.49%	3	0	3
Centre Party	C	1,387	3,072	4,339	1,306	9,766	4,241	2,439	1,880	1,757	4,521	5,492	40,200	19.67%	2	1	3
Christian Democratic Unity	KDS	435	762	654	530	5,209	1,247	703	939	799	1,440	1,161	13,879	6.79%	0	0	0
Liberal People's Party	FP	342	883	1,236	482	5,028	1,482	512	890	443	1,278	1,128	13,704	6.71%	1	0	1
Left Party – Communists	VPK	47	301	402	133	2,696	637	138	409	321	512	470	6,066	2.97%	0	0	0
Green Party	MP	62	162	212	27	773	237	77	149	55	261	288	2,303	1.13%	0	0	0
K-Party	K-P	1	1	2	0	39	13	2	3	2	36	2	101	0.05%	0	0	0
Other parties		0	10	19	2	49	12	0	7	1	12	18	130	0.06%	0	0	0
Valid votes		4,668	12,377	17,816	5,634	73,186	22,072	7,927	12,762	8,172	20,409	19,312	204,335	100.00%	11	1	12
Rejected votes		28	88	170	20	535	148	41	63	34	157	126	1,410	0.69%			
Total polled		4,696	12,465	17,986	5,654	73,721	22,220	7,968	12,825	8,206	20,566	19,438	205,745	92.64%			
Registered electors		5,055	13,633	19,270	6,027	79,545	23,917	8,708	13,910	8,776	22,073	21,181	222,095				
Turnout		92.90%	91.43%	93.34%	93.81%	92.68%	92.90%	91.50%	92.20%	93.51%	93.17%	91.77%	92.64%				

The following candidates were elected: Rune Backlund (C); Anders Björck (M); Anita Bråkenhielm (M); Ingegerd Elm (S); Arne Fransson (C); Åke Gustavsson (S); Kersti Johansson (C); Göte Jonsson (M); Helge Klöver (S); Nils Nordh (S); Catarina Rönnung (S); and Rolf Wirtén (FP).

Permanent substitutions:

- Rolf Wirtén (FP) resigned on 31 December 1983 and was replaced by Linnea Hörlén (FP) on 1 January 1984.

==== 1970s ====
===== 1979 =====
Results of the 1979 general election held on 16 September 1979:

Party		Votes per municipality											Total votes	%	Seats		
Party		Aneby	Eksjö	Gisla- ved	Gnosjö	Jönkö- ping	Nässjö	Sävsjö	Tranås	Vagge- ryd	Värn- amo	Vet- landa	Total votes	%	Con.	Lev.	Tot.
Swedish Social Democratic Party	S	1,172	4,095	6,337	1,634	29,763	9,367	2,047	5,199	2,868	6,773	6,252	75,507	37.40%	5	0	5
Centre Party	C	1,610	3,697	5,127	1,503	12,407	5,159	2,866	2,307	2,102	5,415	6,150	48,343	23.95%	3	0	3
Moderate Party	M	957	2,537	3,146	1,141	14,910	3,685	1,726	2,529	1,451	4,004	3,524	39,610	19.62%	2	1	3
Liberal People's Party	FP	524	1,377	1,897	650	8,765	2,498	726	1,583	724	2,179	1,890	22,813	11.30%	1	1	2
Christian Democratic Unity	KDS	233	488	393	383	3,143	675	395	522	544	973	729	8,478	4.20%	0	0	0
Left Party – Communists	VPK	59	224	456	135	2,923	767	143	380	316	549	483	6,435	3.19%	0	0	0
Communist Party of Sweden	SKP	1	8	13	0	73	18	1	19	11	30	24	198	0.10%	0	0	0
Workers' Party – The Communists	APK	0	5	8	0	50	25	10	1	4	38	5	146	0.07%	0	0	0
Other parties		5	20	29	1	152	29	6	29	14	28	34	347	0.17%	0	0	0
Valid votes		4,561	12,451	17,406	5,447	72,186	22,223	7,920	12,569	8,034	19,989	19,091	201,877	100.00%	11	2	13
Rejected votes		13	35	74	14	364	84	18	34	25	82	46	789	0.39%			
Total polled		4,574	12,486	17,480	5,461	72,550	22,307	7,938	12,603	8,059	20,071	19,137	202,666	92.13%			
Registered electors		4,942	13,602	18,756	5,820	78,790	24,163	8,665	13,876	8,639	21,662	21,068	219,983				
Turnout		92.55%	91.80%	93.20%	93.83%	92.08%	92.32%	91.61%	90.83%	93.29%	92.66%	90.83%	92.13%				

The following candidates were elected: Torsten Bengtson (C); Anders Björck (M); Anita Bråkenhielm (M); Ingegerd Elm (S); Arne Fransson (C); Åke Gustavsson (S); Linnea Hörlén (FP); Sven Johansson (C); Göte Jonsson (M); Göran Karlsson (S); Helge Klöver (S); Catarina Rönnung (S); and Rolf Wirtén (FP).

===== 1976 =====
Results of the 1976 general election held on 19 September 1976:

Party		Votes per municipality											Total votes	%	Seats		
Party		Aneby	Eksjö	Gisla- ved	Gnosjö	Jönkö- ping	Nässjö	Sävsjö	Tranås	Vagge- ryd	Värn- amo	Vet- landa	Total votes	%	Con.	Lev.	Tot.
Swedish Social Democratic Party	S	1,055	4,036	5,985	1,528	29,456	9,317	1,923	5,240	2,678	6,463	6,168	73,849	36.44%	4	1	5
Centre Party	C	1,860	4,619	6,278	1,856	16,997	6,478	3,399	3,266	2,510	6,802	7,489	61,554	30.37%	4	0	4
Moderate Party	M	727	1,873	2,425	886	12,119	2,888	1,294	1,983	1,150	3,138	2,705	31,188	15.39%	2	0	2
People's Party	F	557	1,506	1,674	623	9,127	2,701	841	1,499	710	2,113	1,886	23,237	11.47%	1	1	2
Christian Democratic Unity	KDS	202	389	379	340	2,725	546	276	468	476	941	636	7,378	3.64%	0	0	0
Left Party – Communists	VPK	44	199	349	90	2,172	668	126	292	241	515	337	5,033	2.48%	0	0	0
Communist Party of Sweden	SKP	10	14	13	5	154	49	1	28	10	44	31	359	0.18%	0	0	0
Other parties		3	3	11	0	19	13	0	2	0	4	0	55	0.03%	0	0	0
Valid votes		4,458	12,639	17,114	5,328	72,769	22,660	7,860	12,778	7,775	20,020	19,252	202,653	100.00%	11	2	13
Rejected votes		1	21	39	12	226	55	9	32	15	31	32	473	0.23%			
Total polled		4,459	12,660	17,153	5,340	72,995	22,715	7,869	12,810	7,790	20,051	19,284	203,126	93.20%			
Registered electors		4,764	13,631	18,334	5,594	78,400	24,412	8,532	13,862	8,233	21,368	20,822	217,952				
Turnout		93.60%	92.88%	93.56%	95.46%	93.11%	93.05%	92.23%	92.41%	94.62%	93.84%	92.61%	93.20%				

The following candidates were elected: Torsten Bengtson (C); Anders Björck (M); Arne Fransson (C); Åke Gustavsson (S); Linnea Hörlén (F); Sven Johansson (C); Tage Johansson (S); Göran Karlsson (S); Helge Klöver (S); Carl-Wilhelm Lothigius (M); Arne Magnusson (C); Catarina Rönnung (S); and Rolf Wirtén (F).

===== 1973 =====
Results of the 1973 general election held on 16 September 1973:

Party		Votes per municipality											Total votes	%	Seats		
Party		Aneby	Eksjö	Gisla- ved	Gnosjö	Jönkö- ping	Nässjö	Sävsjö	Tranås	Vagge- ryd	Värn- amo	Vet- landa	Total votes	%	Con.	Lev.	Tot.
Swedish Social Democratic Party	S	1,078	4,138	6,018	1,414	29,123	9,412	1,915	5,167	2,494	6,311	6,361	73,431	38.07%	5	0	5
Centre Party	C	1,542	3,996	5,897	1,733	15,809	6,013	3,001	3,067	2,272	6,220	6,845	56,395	29.24%	3	1	4
Moderate Party	M	612	1,769	2,040	721	10,378	2,650	1,302	1,658	1,012	2,707	2,389	27,238	14.12%	2	0	2
People's Party	F	503	1,298	1,435	471	7,367	2,134	696	1,341	650	1,606	1,576	19,077	9.89%	1	1	2
Christian Democratic Unity	KDS	354	615	468	401	3,856	892	449	783	583	1,277	1,018	10,696	5.55%	0	0	0
Left Party – Communists	VPK	44	187	314	97	2,367	794	135	385	249	522	348	5,442	2.82%	0	0	0
Communist Party of Sweden	SKP	2	36	8	2	105	91	9	38	23	56	27	397	0.21%	0	0	0
Communist League Marxist–Leninists (the revolutionaries)	KFML(r)	0	9	20	3	127	7	3	3	4	17	1	194	0.10%	0	0	0
Other parties		0	1	1	0	7	1	0	3	0	0	0	13	0.01%	0	0	0
Valid votes		4,135	12,049	16,201	4,842	69,139	21,994	7,510	12,445	7,287	18,716	18,565	192,883	100.00%	11	2	13
Rejected votes		7	8	21	5	69	25	7	12	4	22	8	188	0.10%			
Total polled		4,142	12,057	16,222	4,847	69,208	22,019	7,517	12,457	7,291	18,738	18,573	193,071	92.43%			
Registered electors		4,521	13,158	17,309	5,085	75,088	23,785	8,209	13,577	7,753	20,121	20,268	208,874				
Turnout		91.62%	91.63%	93.72%	95.32%	92.17%	92.58%	91.57%	91.75%	94.04%	93.13%	91.64%	92.43%				

The following candidates were elected: Torsten Bengtson (C); Anders Björck (M); Arne Fransson (C); Åke Gustavsson (S); Linnea Hörlén (F); Sven Johansson (C); Tage Johansson (S); Göran Karlsson (S); Carl-Wilhelm Lothigius (M); Arne Magnusson (C); Karl Rask (S); Catarina Rönnung (S); and Rolf Wirtén (F).

===== 1970 =====
Results of the 1970 general election held on 20 September 1970:

Party		Votes per municipality																				Total votes	%	Seats		
Party		Anders- torp	Aneby	Burse- ryd	Eksjö	Gisla- ved	Gnosjö	Hjälm- seryd	Hylte	Jönkö- ping	Nässjö	Ref- tele	Sävsjö	Södra Mo	Tranås	Unna- ryd	Vagge- ryd	Värn- amo	Vet- landa	Vill- stad	Postal votes	Total votes	%	Con.	Lev.	Tot.
Swedish Social Democratic Party	S	1,030	1,006	375	3,745	2,538	1,350	409	1,368	25,981	8,320	409	1,388	227	4,891	190	2,407	5,678	5,722	1,060	6,810	74,904	38.89%	5	0	5
Centre Party	C	486	1,256	790	3,032	853	1,407	1,143	1,416	10,866	4,954	1,120	1,311	424	2,190	565	1,823	4,824	5,851	935	3,752	48,998	25.44%	3	1	4
People's Party	F	413	698	227	1,495	449	624	331	150	9,965	2,796	172	636	242	1,605	77	905	2,163	1,935	290	4,944	30,117	15.64%	2	0	2
Moderate Party	M	372	481	292	1,119	330	575	366	277	6,544	1,926	214	612	161	1,012	187	856	2,074	1,734	300	4,528	23,960	12.44%	2	0	2
Christian Democratic Unity	KDS	39	259	33	396	92	299	169	44	2,621	601	52	201	22	496	34	442	944	794	87	1,400	9,025	4.69%	0	0	0
Left Party – Communists	VPK	52	33	16	150	144	80	16	25	2,101	618	7	89	4	361	9	249	483	343	27	549	5,356	2.78%	0	0	0
Communist League Marxists-Leninists	KFML	0	3	0	13	4	14	0	2	58	45	0	0	0	7	0	1	14	4	1	85	251	0.13%	0	0	0
Other parties		0	0	0	0	0	0	0	0	3	0	0	0	0	0	0	0	0	0	0	11	14	0.01%	0	0	0
Valid votes		2,392	3,736	1,733	9,950	4,410	4,349	2,434	3,282	58,139	19,260	1,974	4,237	1,080	10,562	1,062	6,683	16,180	16,383	2,700	22,079	192,625	100.00%	12	1	13
Rejected votes		2	0	2	7	3	3	0	2	54	15	0	5	0	34	1	6	15	11	3	65	228	0.12%			
Total polled exc. postal votes		2,394	3,736	1,735	9,957	4,413	4,352	2,434	3,284	58,193	19,275	1,974	4,242	1,080	10,596	1,063	6,689	16,195	16,394	2,703	22,144	192,853				
Postal votes		220	347	123	1,829	477	278	110	334	8,641	2,771	133	534	51	1,651	77	630	1,842	1,813	258	-22,144	-25				
Total polled inc. postal votes		2,614	4,083	1,858	11,786	4,890	4,630	2,544	3,618	66,834	22,046	2,107	4,776	1,131	12,247	1,140	7,319	18,037	18,207	2,961	0	192,828	90.62%			
Registered electors		2,771	4,541	2,013	13,170	5,284	4,962	2,827	3,907	74,167	24,195	2,288	5,306	1,203	13,653	1,260	7,887	19,786	20,335	3,225		212,780				
Turnout		94.33%	89.91%	92.30%	89.49%	92.54%	93.31%	89.99%	92.60%	90.11%	91.12%	92.09%	90.01%	94.01%	89.70%	90.48%	92.80%	91.16%	89.54%	91.81%		90.62%				

The following candidates were elected: Harald Almgren (S); Torsten Bengtson (C); Anders Björck (M); Arne Fransson (C); Åke Gustavsson (S); Sven Johansson (C); Tage Johansson (S); Göran Karlsson (S); Carl-Wilhelm Lothigius (M); Arne Magnusson (C); Karl Rask (S); Gösta Sterne (F); and Rolf Wirtén (F).

Permanent substitutions:

- Gösta Sterne (F) died on 1 February 1971 and was replaced by Linnea Hörlén (F) on 17 February 1971.
