= Wahlström =

Wahlström or Wahlstrom is a Swedish surname, which means "meadow by a stream". It may refer to:

- Becky Wahlstrom (born 1975), American actress
- Charlotte Wahlström (1849–1924), Swedish painter
- Elin Wahlström (born 1993), Swedish football player
- Emil Wahlström (born 1987), Swedish football player
- Eva Wahlström (born 1980), Finnish boxer
- Göte Wahlström (born 1951), Swedish politician
- Jarl Wahlström (1918–1999), Finnish religious leader
- Johannes Wahlström (born 1981), Swedish journalist
- Lydia Wahlström (1869–1954), Swedish historian
- Magnus Wahlström (1903–1972), American entrepreneur
- Margareta Wahlström (born 1950), Swedish diplomat and social scientist
- Mats Wahlstrom, Swedish entrepreneur and hotelier
- Oliver Wahlstrom (born 2000), American ice hockey player
- Oskar Wahlström (born 1976), Swedish football player
- Richard Wahlstrom (1931–2003), American rower
- Sigrid Wahlström (1888–1984), Swedish painter
- Susanne Wahlström (born 1973), Swedish politician

== See also ==
- Wahlström & Widstrand, a Swedish book publisher
- Wahlstrom Peak, Antarctica
- Wahlströms, a Swedish dansband from 1985
