= Erik Nygårds =

Swedish politician (born 1965)

Member of the Riksdag
- Incumbent
- Assumed office 28 September 2026
- Constituency: Jönköping County

Personal details
- Born: 12 June 1965 (age 61) Valdemarsvik, Sweden
- Party: Liberals

Lars Erik Nygårds (born 12 June 1965) is a Swedish politician from the Liberals. He has been a member of the Riksdag since 2026, elected for the Jönköping County constituency.

== Biography ==
Nygårds was born in Valdemarsvik and raised in Linköping. He has at least three years of post-secondary education and has lived in Tranås since the 1990s.

Nygårds has worked as a business developer in Nässjö and also runs a small consulting company.

== Political career ==
Nygårds has held political positions in Tranås Municipality since the 2000s. He has been a member of the municipal council and the municipal executive board, as well as chairman of the children and education committee. He has also been a member of the municipal executive board's working committee.

In the 2022 Swedish local elections, Nygårds received 77 personal votes, corresponding to 19.64 percent of the Liberals' votes in the constituency of Tranås Municipality.

At the 2026 Swedish general election, Nygårds was the Liberal Party's top name in Jönköping County. On the Liberal Party's national party list, he was in 24th place. Nygårds was elected as a member of parliament for Jönköping County in the 2026 election. He thus became one of the new members of parliament from the county after the election.

== See also ==
- List of members of the Riksdag, 2026–2030
