= Thomas Strand =

Swedish politician (born 1954)

Member of the Riksdag
- In office 1 September 2020 – 1 September 2020
- Preceded by: Peter Persson
- Succeeded by: Diana Laitinen Carlsson
- Constituency: Jönköping County
- In office 2 October 2006 – 24 September 2018
- Constituency: Jönköping County

Personal details
- Born: Lars Ingemar Thomas Strand; 1954 (age 71–72)
- Party: Social Democratic Party

Lars Ingemar Thomas Strand (born 1954) is a Swedish politician and former member of the Riksdag, the national legislature. A member of the Social Democratic Party, he represented Jönköping County between October 2006 and September 2018, and in September 2020. He has been a substitute member of the Riksdag for Martin Nilsson twice: October 2002 to December 2002 and August 2005 to September 2005.

Strand is the son of pastor Ingemar Strand and care assistant Sonia Strand (née Nord). He was educated in Värnamo and studied theology in Kumla. He was a member of the municipal council in Vaggeryd Municipality from 1992 to 2010.
