= Ida Kors =

Swedish politician (born 1982)

Member of the Riksdag
- Incumbent
- Assumed office 28 September 2026
- Constituency: Jönköping County

Personal details
- Born: 13 May 1982 (age 44) Sweden
- Party: Sweden Democrats

Ida Kors (born 13 May 1982) is a Swedish politician from the Sweden Democrats. She has been a member of the Riksdag since 2026, elected for the Jönköping County constituency.

== Biography ==
Kors is a trained treatment educator and has worked as a habilitation educator in autism and other neuropsychiatric functional variations. In 2018, she worked as a special education teacher and lived in Taberg.

=== Political career ===
Kors ran for the Sweden Democrats in the 2018 Swedish local elections in Jönköping Municipality and was elected to the municipal council.

At the 2022 Swedish local elections she continued as a member of the municipal council in Jönköping Municipality. She has also been a member of the municipal executive board and second vice-chair of the individual and family care committee and the procurement committee.

Ahead of the 2026 Swedish general election, Kors ran for the Sweden Democrats. She was elected as a member of parliament for the Jönköping County constituency and took office on 28 September 2026. In the election, she became one of the Sweden Democrats' three members of parliament from Jönköping County.

Kors has stated that she wants to work primarily on social issues in the Riksdag. She has also raised issues concerning Jönköping County, including the possible establishment of a mine at Norra Kärr.

== See also ==
- List of members of the Riksdag, 2026–2030
