= Camilla Rinaldo Miller =

Swedish politician (born 1969)

Camilla Rinaldo Miller S

Member of the Swedish Parliament for Jönköping County
- Incumbent
- Assumed office 23 March 2022
- Preceded by: Acko Ankarberg Johansson

Personal details
- Born: 20 May 1969 (age 57) Rumskulla, Kalmar County
- Party: Christian Democrats
- Profession: Politician

Camilla Maria Karolina Rinaldo Miller (born 20 May 1969) is a Swedish politician from the Christian Democrats who has been a Member of the Riksdag since 2022.

== See also ==
- List of members of the Riksdag, 2022–2026
