= Elisabet Lann =

Swedish politician (born 1977)

Minister for Health Care
- Incumbent
- Assumed office 9 September 2025
- Prime Minister: Ulf Kristersson
- Preceded by: Acko Ankarberg Johansson

Personal details
- Born: 18 February 1977 (age 49) Jönköping, Sweden
- Party: Christian Democrats

Elisabet Sara Lann (born 18 February 1977) is a Swedish politician for the Christian Democrat party. Since 9 September 2025, Lann has been the Minister for Health in Sweden for the Kristersson cabinet.

== Career ==
She was the municipal commissioner for elder care, sports and civil society in Gothenburg from 2019 to 2022 and later a municipal commissioner in opposition after the 2022 election.

=== Minister of Health Care ===
She was appointed minister of health care on 9 September 2025. Upon assuming office, she stated that she aims to increase government control of healthcare in order to reduce waiting times for treatment. During her first press conference as minister, she collapsed and received immediate medical treatment. After recovering, she explained that she had fainted due to low blood sugar.

== Personal life ==
Lann grew up in Månsarp, a small community in Jönköping County. She moved to Gothenburg in 1997 to study political science and Middle Eastern studies, eventually earning a master's degree in Peace and development studies in Jerusalem.

Lann is a survivor of the tsunami disaster in Thailand in 2004, while her younger sister died.

Political offices
Preceded by Acko Ankarberg Johansson	Minister for Health Care; 2025–present	Incumbent
