= Azra Muranovic =

Swedish politician (born 1987)

Member of the Riksdag
- Incumbent
- Assumed office 26 September 2022
- Preceded by: Ilan de Basso
- Constituency: Jönköping County

Personal details
- Born: 1987 (age 38–39)
- Party: Social Democratic Party

Azra Muranovic (born 1987) is a Swedish politician and member of the Riksdag, the national legislature. A member of the Social Democratic Party, she has represented Jönköping County since September 2022. She had previously been a member of the municipal council in Värnamo Municipality.
