= Rikard Salander =

Swedish politician (born 1981)

Member of the Riksdag
- Incumbent
- Assumed office 28 September 2026
- Constituency: Jönköping County

Personal details
- Born: 1981 (age 44–45) Gothenburg, Sweden
- Party: Green

Rikard Salander (born 1981) is a Swedish politician for the Green Party. He has been serving as a member of the Swedish Parliament since the 2026 general election, elected for the Jönköping County constituency.

== Biography ==
Salander was born in Gothenburg and lives in Nässjö Municipality. He studied three years of post-secondary education and has worked as a teacher in municipal adult education.

Salander has held political positions for the Green Party since 2009.

Ahead of the 2026 Swedish general election, Salander was in first place on the Green Party's parliamentary list in Jönköping County. He was elected to the Riksdag for the Jönköping County constituency and took office as a regular member on 28 September 2026.

== See also ==
- List of members of the Riksdag, 2026–2030
