= Acko Ankarberg Johansson =

Swedish politician (born 1964)

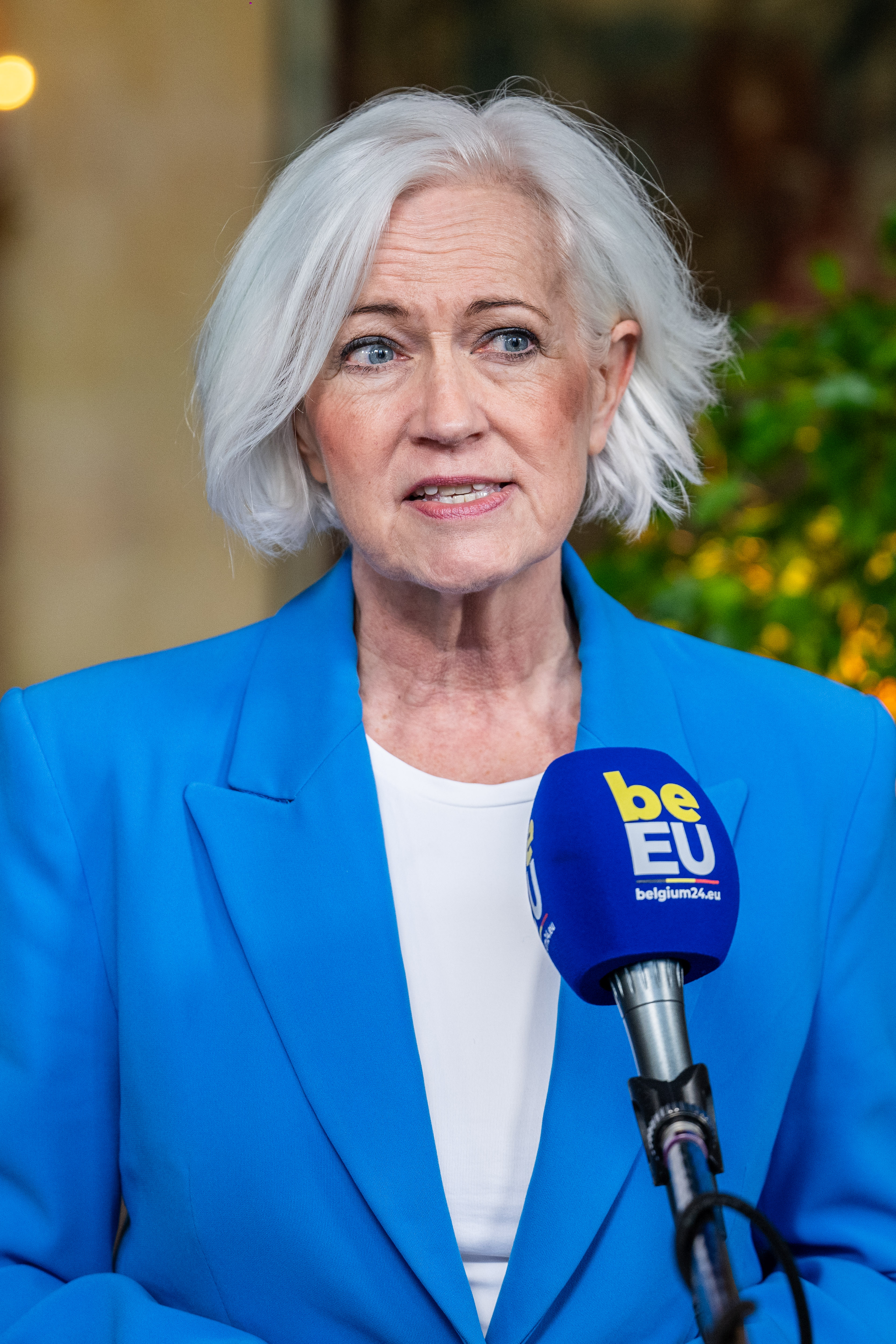
- Ankarberg Johansson in 2024

Governor of Västmanland County
- Incumbent
- Assumed office 10 November 2025
- Monarch: Carl XVI Gustaf
- Prime Minister: Ulf Kristersson
- Preceded by: Johan Sterte

Minister for Health Care
- In office 18 October 2022 – 9 September 2025
- Prime Minister: Ulf Kristersson
- Preceded by: Ardalan Shekarabi (as Minister for Health and Social Affairs)
- Succeeded by: Elisabet Lann

Member of the Riksdag
- In office 24 September 2018 – 16 September 2025
- Constituency: Jönköping County

Mayor of Jönköping
- In office 1 January 2007 – 1 January 2011
- Preceded by: Peter Persson
- Succeeded by: Mats Green

Personal details
- Born: Ann-Charlott Linnéa Cecilia Ankarberg; 29 October 1964 (age 61) Jönköping, Sweden
- Party: Christian Democrats
- Spouse: Bo Johansson (m. 1987)

Ann-Charlotte Linnea Cecilia "Acko" Ankarberg Johansson (née Ankarberg; born 29 October 1964) is a Swedish politician and civil servant serving as the Governor of Västmanland County since 10 November 2025.

She previously served as Minister for Health Care in the cabinet of Prime Minister Ulf Kristersson from October 2022 to September 2025. A member of the Christian Democrats, she has been a member of the Riksdag since 2018 and was party secretary from 2010 to 2018.

Prior to becoming party secretary in 2010, Ankarberg Johansson served as Mayor of Jönköping from 2006 to 2010.

== Honours ==
=== Foreign honours ===
- Iceland: Grand Cross of the Order of the Falcon (6 May 2025)

Party political offices
Preceded by Lennart Sjögren	Party secretary of the Christian Democrats; 2010–2018	Succeeded by Peter Kullgren
Political offices
Preceded by Peter Persson	Mayor of Jönköping; 2006–2010	Succeeded by Mats Green
Preceded by Ardalan Shekarabi	Minister for Health Care; 2022–2025	Succeeded by Elisabet Lann
Government offices
Preceded by Johan Sterte	Governor of Västmanland County; 2025–present	Incumbent
