= Niklas Sigvardsson =

Swedish politician (born 1991)

Member of the Riksdag
- Incumbent
- Assumed office 26 September 2022
- Constituency: Jönköping County

Personal details
- Born: 1991 (age 34–35)
- Party: Social Democrats

Niklas Sigvardsson (born 1991) is a Swedish politician. He was elected as Member of the Riksdag in September 2022. He represents the constituency of Jönköping County. He is affiliated with the Social Democrats.
