= Mats Green =

Swedish politician (born 1979)

Member of the Riksdag
- Incumbent
- Assumed office 29 September 2014
- Constituency: Jönköping County

Mayor of Jönköping
- In office 1 January 2011 – 1 January 2015
- Preceded by: Acko Ankarberg Johansson
- Succeeded by: Ann-Marie Nilsson

Personal details
- Born: 6 April 1979 (age 47) Huskvarna, Sweden
- Party: Moderate Party

Mats Anders Green (born 6 April 1979) is a Swedish politician of the Moderate Party. He has been Member of the Riksdag since the 2014 general election, representing his home constituency Jönköping County. He served as Mayor of Jönköping from 2011 to 2014.

In the Riksdag, Green is a member of the Committee on Civil Affairs and a deputy member of the Committee on Defence. In May 2015 the Government appointed Green as the Riksdag's only representative to The Swedish Commission for Shoreland Protection and Management, which mission was completed by December 2015. On 10 October 2017, Green was appointed his party's spokesperson on housing, being further promoted to spokesperson on employment and integration in May 2019.

Green was elected member of the national executive board of the Moderate Party at the party congress in October 2019.
