= Helena Bouveng =

Swedish politician of the Moderate Party

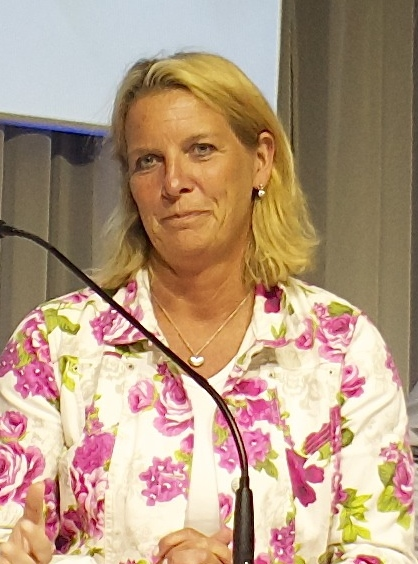

Member of the Riksdag
- In office 2 October 2006 – 28 September 2026
- Constituency: Jönköping County

Personal details
- Born: 9 August 1962 (age 64) Vetlanda, Sweden
- Party: Moderate Party

Kerstin Helena Bouveng (born 9 August 1962) is a Swedish politician of the Moderate Party. She was member of the Riksdag from 2006 to 2026, representing her home constituency Jönköping County.

Bouveng is the daughter of Nils Bouveng, founder of Sapa Group.
