= Ciczie Weidby =

Swedish politician (born 1974)

MP for Jönköping County
- Incumbent
- Assumed office 24 September 2018

Personal details
- Born: 30 August 1974 (age 52)
- Party: Left Party

Ciczie Anna Kerstin Cecilia Weidby (born 30 August 1974) is a Swedish politician from the Left Party, who has been a member of the Riksdag from Jönköping County since 2018.

She was also elected as Member of the Riksdag in September 2022.

== See also ==
- List of members of the Riksdag, 2018–2022
- List of members of the Riksdag, 2022–2026
- List of members of the Riksdag, 2026–2030
