= Emma Brihall =

Swedish politician (born 1997)

Member of the Riksdag
- Incumbent
- Assumed office 28 September 2026
- Constituency: Jönköping County

Personal details
- Born: 24 July 1997 (age 29)
- Party: Centre Party

Emma Helga Maria Brihall (born 24 July 1997) is a Swedish politician serving as a member of the Riksdag since 2026. She is the chairwoman of the Centre Party in Jönköping Municipality.
