= Carina Ödebrink =

Swedish politician (born 1961)

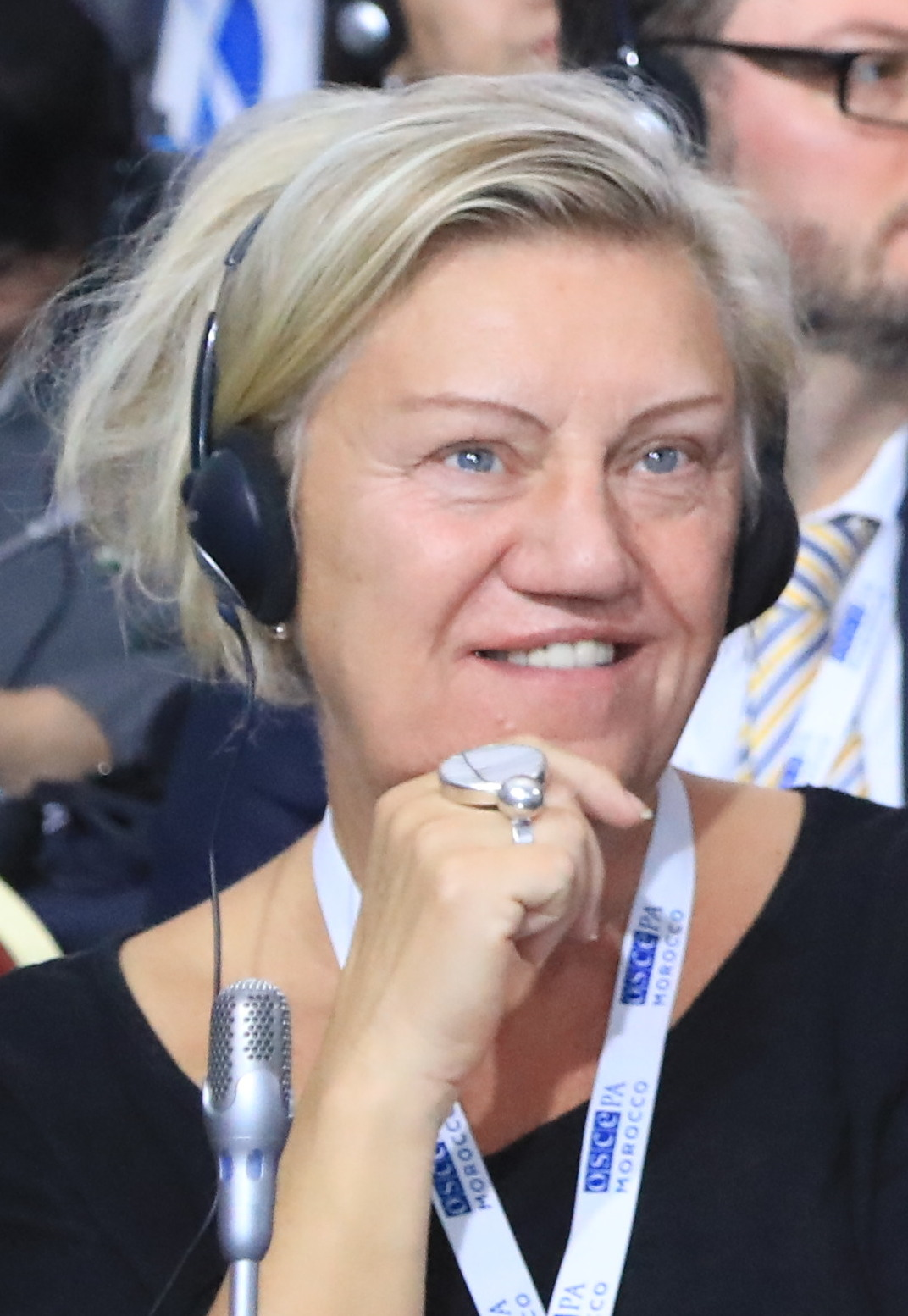
- Ödebrink in 2019

Member of the Riksdag
- Incumbent
- Assumed office 24 September 2018
- Constituency: Jönköping County

Personal details
- Born: 1961 (age 64–65)
- Party: Social Democrats

Carina Ödebrink (born 1961) is a Swedish politician. Since September 2018, she serves as Member of the Riksdag representing the constituency of Jönköping County. She was also elected as Member of the Riksdag in September 2022. She is affiliated with the Social Democrats.
