= Catarina Rönnung =

Swedish politician (born 1938)

Member of the Riksdag
- In office 3 October 1976 – 5 October 1998
- Constituency: Jönköping County

Personal details
- Born: 1938 (age 87–88)
- Party: Social Democratic Party
- Children: 3

Catarina Rönnung (born 1938) is a Swedish politician. A member of the Social Democratic Party, she represented Jönköping County in the Riksdag from 3 October 1976 to 5 October 1998. In 1991, she traveled to Ukraine to monitor the independence referendum at the behest of the Presidium and the Social Democratic Party of Ukraine. She was a member of the digital television committee in 1998. She was married to Torbjörn Rönnung from 1959 until his death in 2019. They had three children.
