= Peter Persson =

Swedish politician (born 1955)

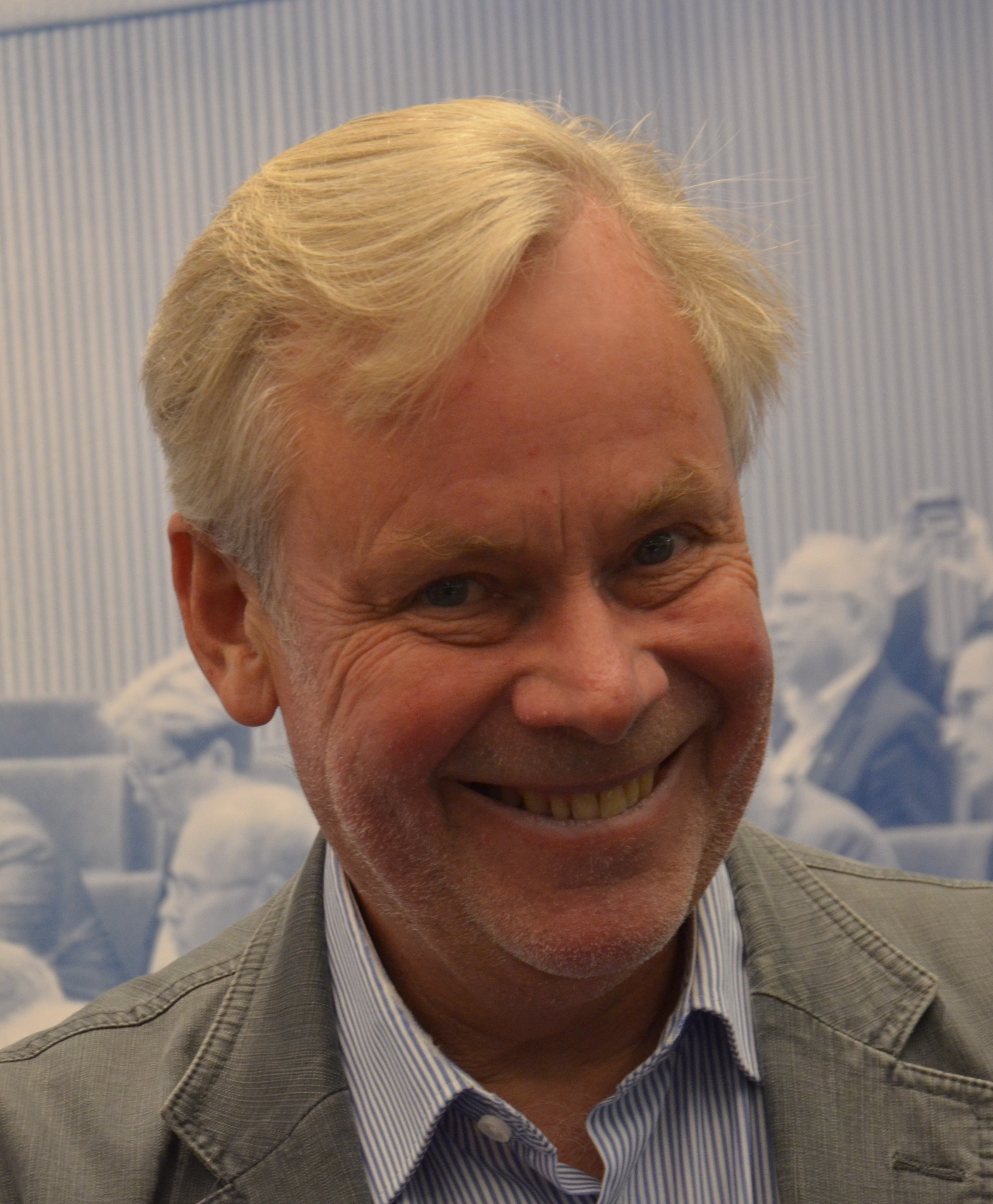
- Persson in September 2014

Member of the Riksdag
- In office 4 October 2010 – 31 August 2020
- Succeeded by: Thomas Strand
- Constituency: Jönköping County

Personal details
- Born: Leif Peter Gunnar Persson; 1955 (age 70–71)
- Party: Social Democratic Party
- Spouse: Margareta Persson

Leif Peter Gunnar Persson (born 1955) is a Swedish politician and former member of the Riksdag, the national legislature. A member of the Social Democratic Party, he represented Jönköping County between October 2010 and August 2020.

Persson is the son of Leif Persson and Ingegerd Persson (née Karlsson). He was an instrument mechanic in Nymölla from 1974 to 1984. He was a member of the municipal council in Kristianstad Municipality. He was a member of the municipal council in Jönköping Municipality between 1988 and 2010. He was married to former Riksdag member Margareta Persson. He retired from politics in 2020 and moved back to Kristianstad.
