= Sotiris Delis =

Swedish politician of the Moderate Party

Member of the Riksdag
- In office 29 September 2014 – 24 September 2018
- Constituency: Jönköping County

Personal details
- Born: 7 February 1955 (age 71) Patra, Greece
- Party: Moderate Party
- Profession: Banker

Sotiris Delis (born 7 February 1955) is a Swedish politician of the Moderate Party. He was Member of the Riksdag from the 2014 general election to the 2018 general election, representing his home constituency Jönköping County. He is a banker by profession.

In the Riksdag, Delis was a deputy member of the Committee on Foreign Affairs from January 2015 to September 2018. He was first deputy member of the Committee on Environment and Agriculture from October 2014 to January 2015.
