= Jakob Olofsgård =

Swedish politician

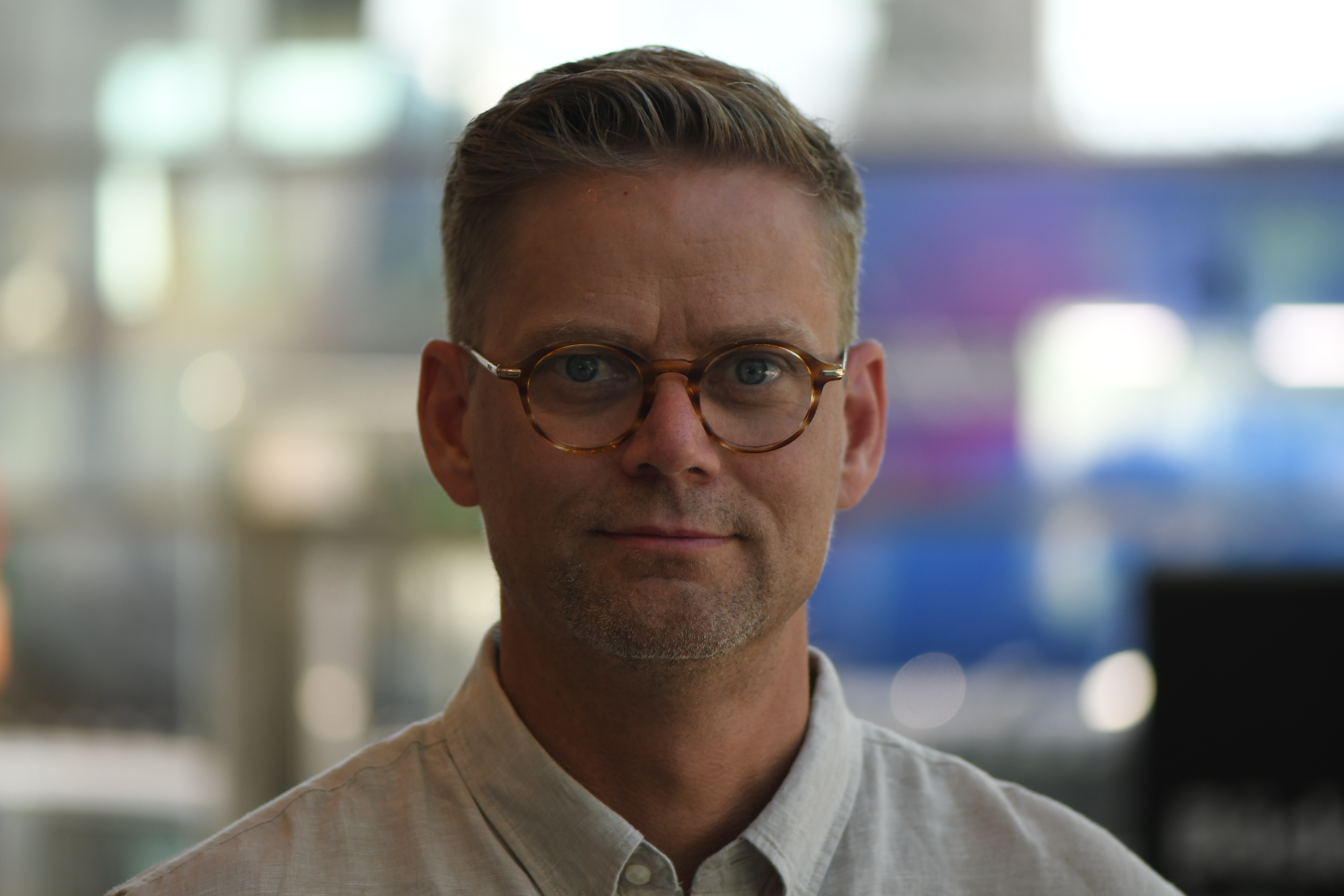
- Jakob Olofsgård in 2023

Member of the Riksdag
- Incumbent
- Assumed office 2021
- Constituency: Jönköping County

Liberal Party Secretary
- In office 12 April 2024 – 31 March 2025

Personal details
- Born: 25 July 1975 (age 50) Jönköping County, Sweden
- Party: Liberals

Jakob Pär Edgart Olofsgård (born 25 July 1975) is a Swedish politician from the Liberals. He has been a member of the Riksdag since 2021 for the Jönköping County constituency.

From 12 April 2024 to 31 March 2025, he was the Liberal Party's party secretary.

== Biography ==
Jakob Olofsgård was born and raised in Skede in Vetlanda Municipality, but has lived in Jönköping for many years. He has a background as a pastor in Equmenia Church, but worked as a project manager in the construction sector. He succeeded Emma Carlsson Löfdahl on 1 August 2021, who left her seat as a political independent in the Riksdag on 31 July 2021.

He succeeded Gulan Avci as the party's party secretary on 12 April 2024 and announced his resignation in March 2025.

== See also ==
- List of members of the Riksdag, 2022–2026
