= Emma Hult =

Swedish politician (born 1988)

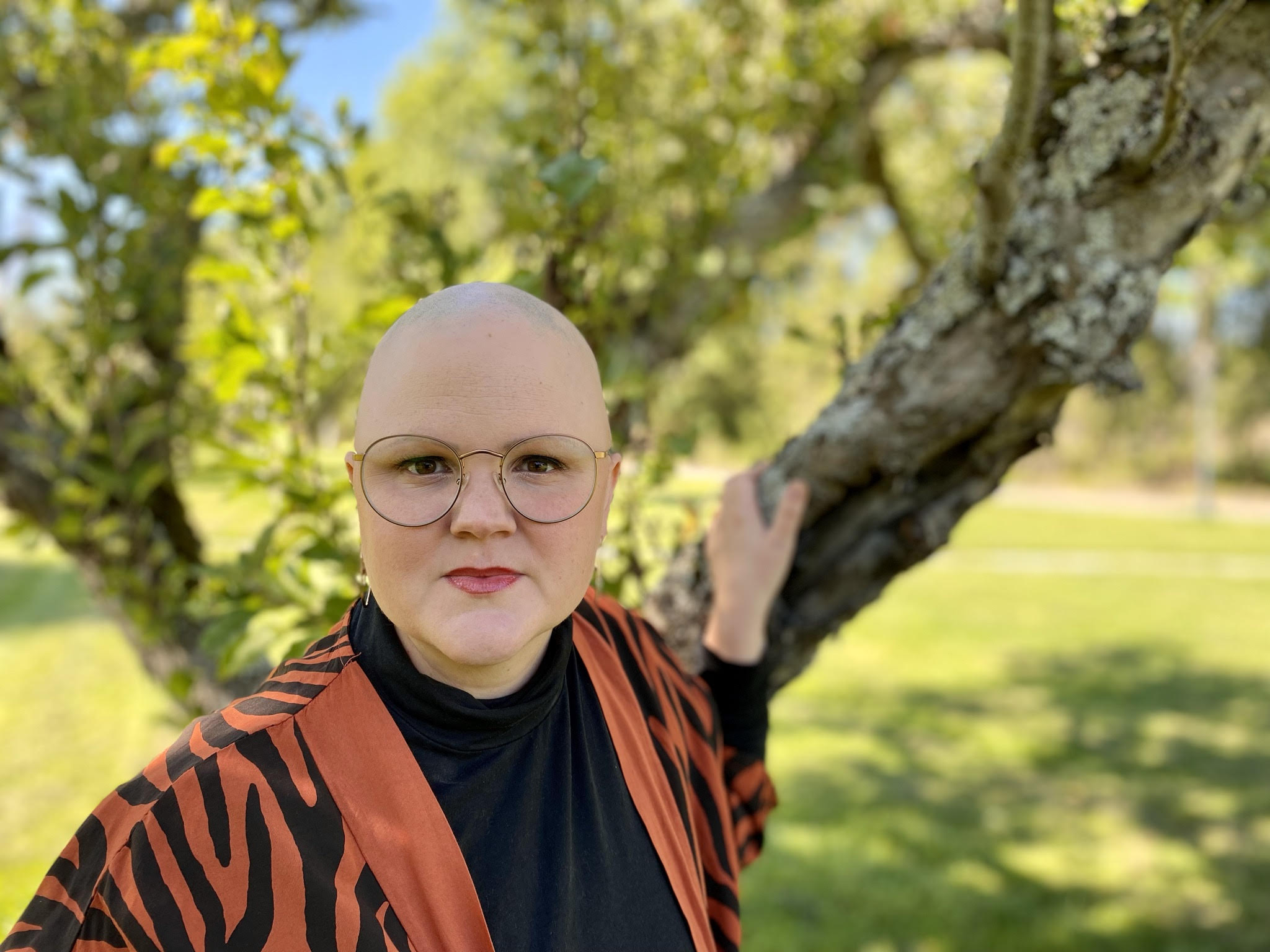
- Hult in August 2021

Member of the Riksdag
- In office 29 September 2014 – 26 September 2022
- Constituency: Jönköping County

Personal details
- Born: 1988 (age 37–38)
- Party: Green Party

Emma Ulla Elisabet Hult (born 1988) is a Swedish politician and former member of the Riksdag, the national legislature. A member of the Green Party, she represented Jönköping County between September 2014 and September 2022.

Hult was educated in Trelleborg. She studied engineering at Jönköping University and architecture at Deakin University. She was a building permit administrator from 2011 to 2012 and a development engineer from 2012 to 2014.
