= Susanne Wahlström =

Swedish politician (born 1973)

Member of the Riksdag
- Incumbent
- Assumed office 28 September 2026
- Constituency: Jönköping County

Personal details
- Born: Susana Elisabeth Susanne Svensson; 10 August 1973 (age 53) Argentina
- Party: Moderate Party

Susana Elisabeth Susanne Wahlström (née Svensson; born 10 August 1973) is a Swedish politician from the Moderate Party. She has been a member of the Riksdag since 2026, elected for the Jönköping County constituency. She has been the chairwoman of the municipal board of Habo Municipality since 1 January 2019.

She has been a substitute in the Swedish Local and Regional Authorities' Committee for EU Affairs and a substitute in the European Committee of the Regions since January 2025.

Wahlström was the chairwoman of the Moderate Women in Jönköping County from 2016 to 2020. She has been the chairwoman of the Moderate Women's Association in Jönköping County since 2023.

She has been married to Fredrik Wahlström (born 1973) since 2006.

== See also ==
- List of members of the Riksdag, 2026–2030
