= Kew Nordqvist =

Swedish politician (born 1950)

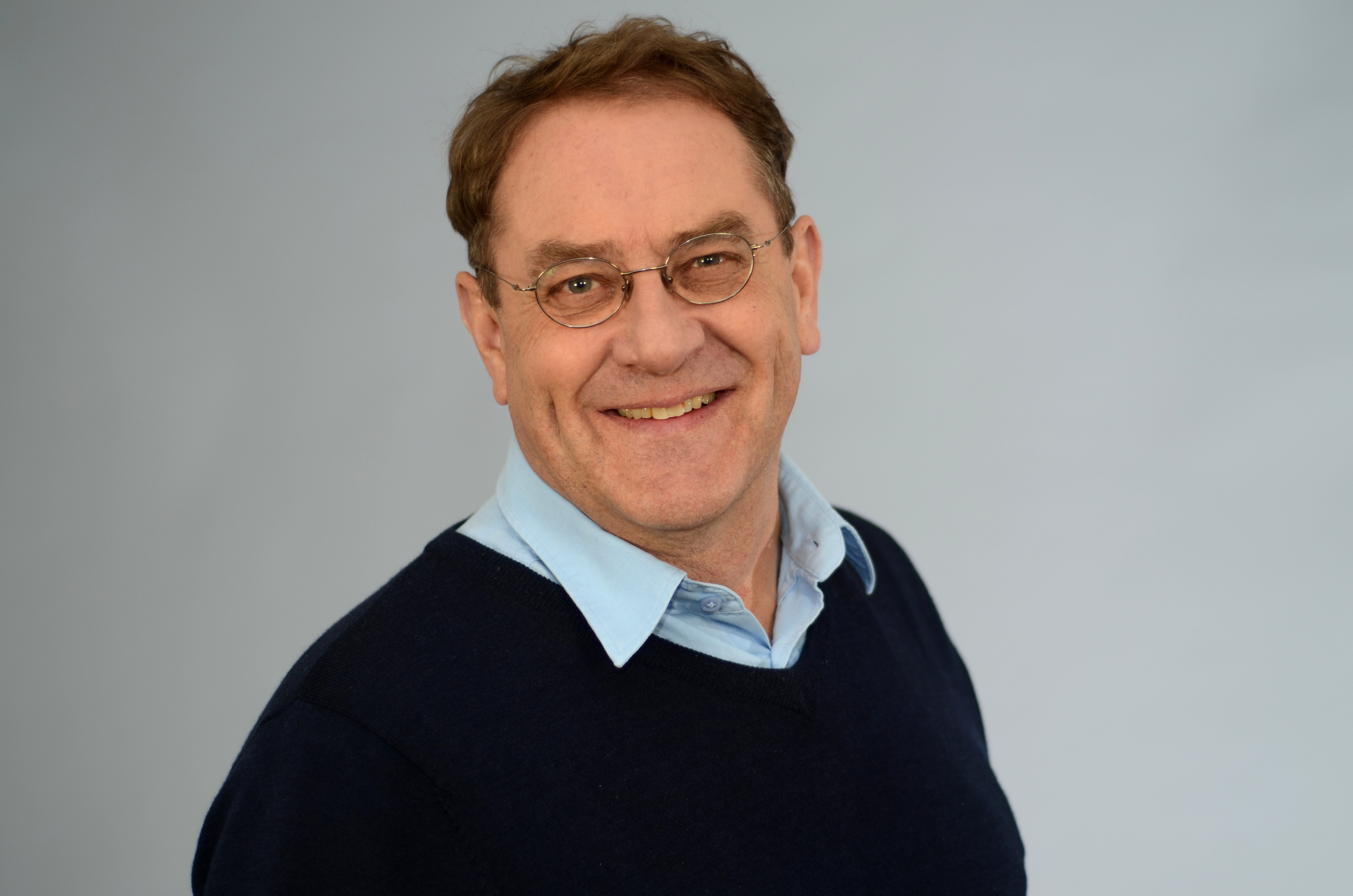
- Nordqvist in February 2012

Member of the Riksdag
- In office 4 October 2010 – 29 September 2014
- Constituency: Jönköping County

Personal details
- Born: 1950 (age 75–76)
- Party: Green Party

Kew Olle Nordqvist (born 1950) is a Swedish politician and former member of the Riksdag, the national legislature. A member of the Green Party, he represented Jönköping County from October 2010 to September 2014.
