= Emma Carlsson Löfdahl =

Swedish politician (born 1970)

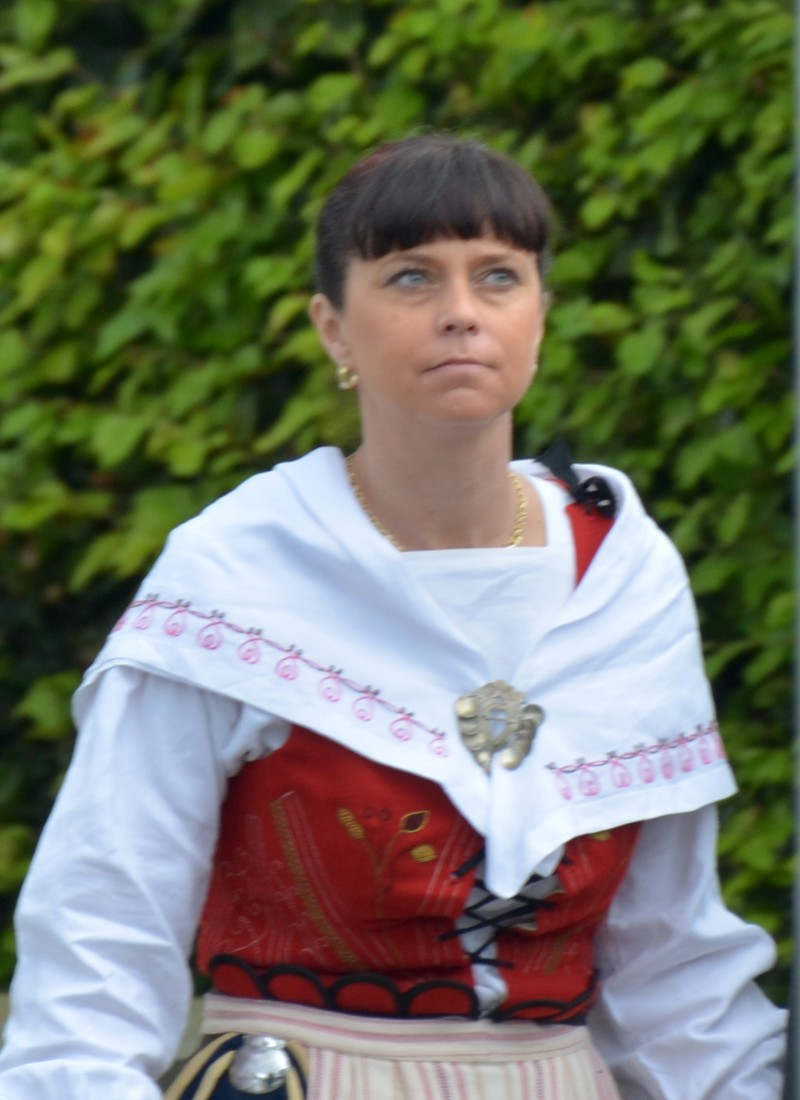
Carlsson Löfdahl in 2012

Emma Maria Carlsson Löfdahl, formerly Emma Löfdahl Landberg (born Andersson on 26 September 1970), is a former member of the Riksdag (MP) from the Jönköping County constituency. Formerly a member of the Liberals (L), she has been an independent politician since March 2019. In 2021, she announced that she would leave the Riksdag effective 1 August 2021. She was succeeded by Liberal MP Jakob Olofsgård.

== See also ==
- Member of Parliament (Sweden)
