= Johanna Haraldsson =

Swedish politician (born 1980)

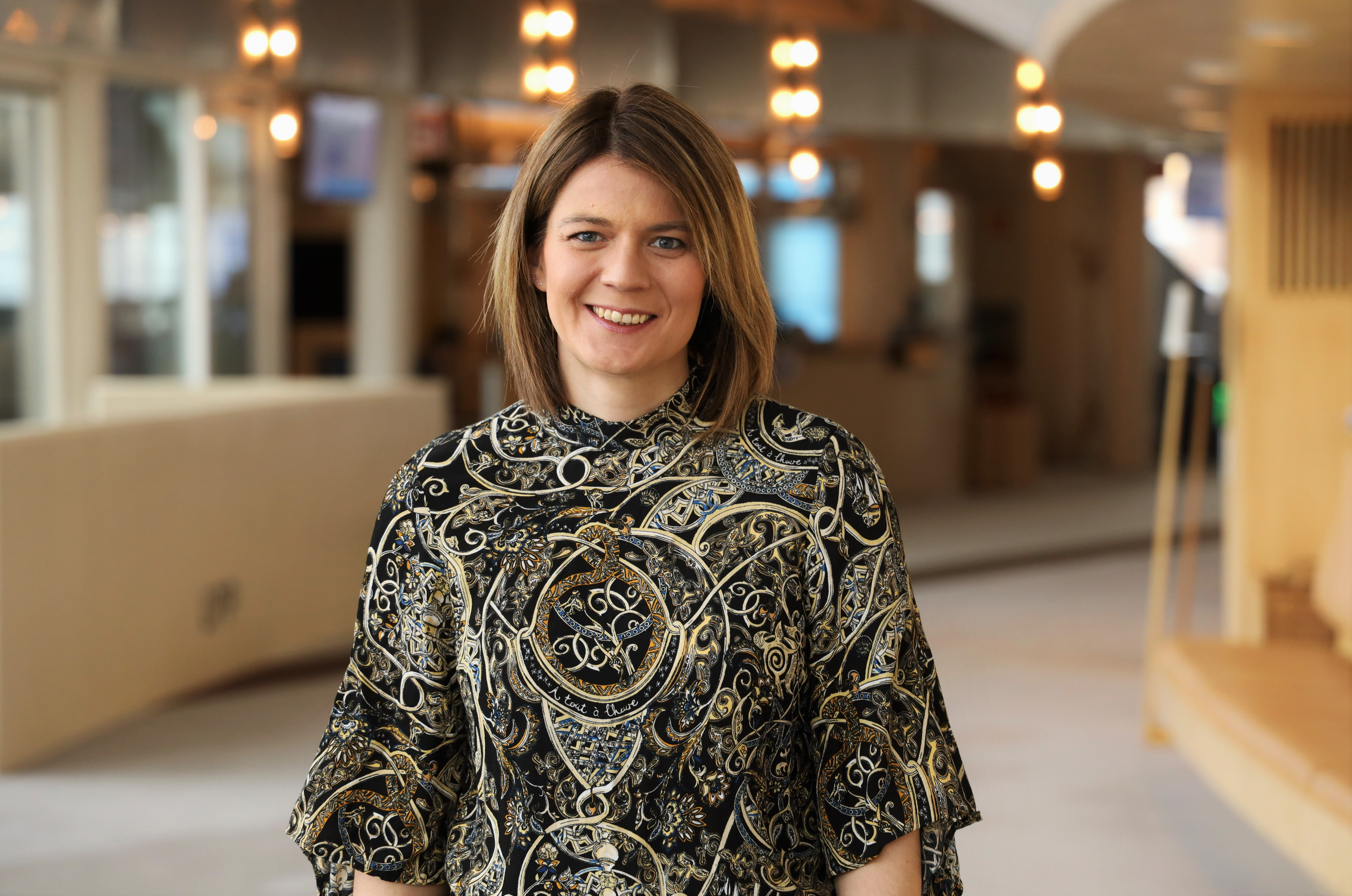

First Deputy Speaker of the Riksdag
- Incumbent
- Assumed office 28 September 2026
- Speaker: Andreas Norlén
- Preceded by: Kenneth G. Forslund

Member of the Riksdag
- Incumbent
- Assumed office 29 September 2014
- Constituency: Jönköping County

Personal details
- Born: 1980 (age 45–46)
- Party: Social Democratic Party
- Occupation: Politician

Johanna Haraldsson (born 1980) is a Swedish Social Democratic Party politician.

She was elected member of the Riksdag for the period 2014–2018, from the Jönköping County constituency, and was re-elected in 2022.
