= Sven Johansson (politician, born 1916) =

Swedish politician

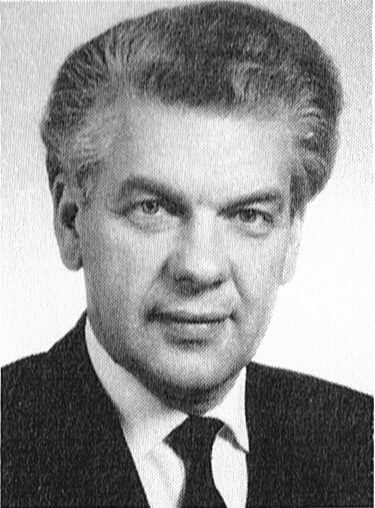
Sven Johansson

Sven Johansson, (September 6, 1916 – July 11, 1987) born in Skärstad, was a Swedish politician. Elected in Jönköping County's constituency, he was a member of the Centre Party, Johansson was a member of the second chamber of the Center Party from 1965 until 1982, when he became a member of the Christian Democrats.
