= Helene Petersson =

Swedish politician (born 1956)

Member of the Riksdag
- Incumbent
- Assumed office 2004

Personal details
- Party: Social Democratic

Helene Petersson (née Francke) (born May 30, 1956) is a Swedish Social Democratic politician, born in Sävsjö Parish, Jönköping County. She was a member of the Riksdag from 2004 to 2018.

She currently lives in Stockaryd, Sävsjö Municipality.
