= Alice Åström =

Swedish politician (born 1959)

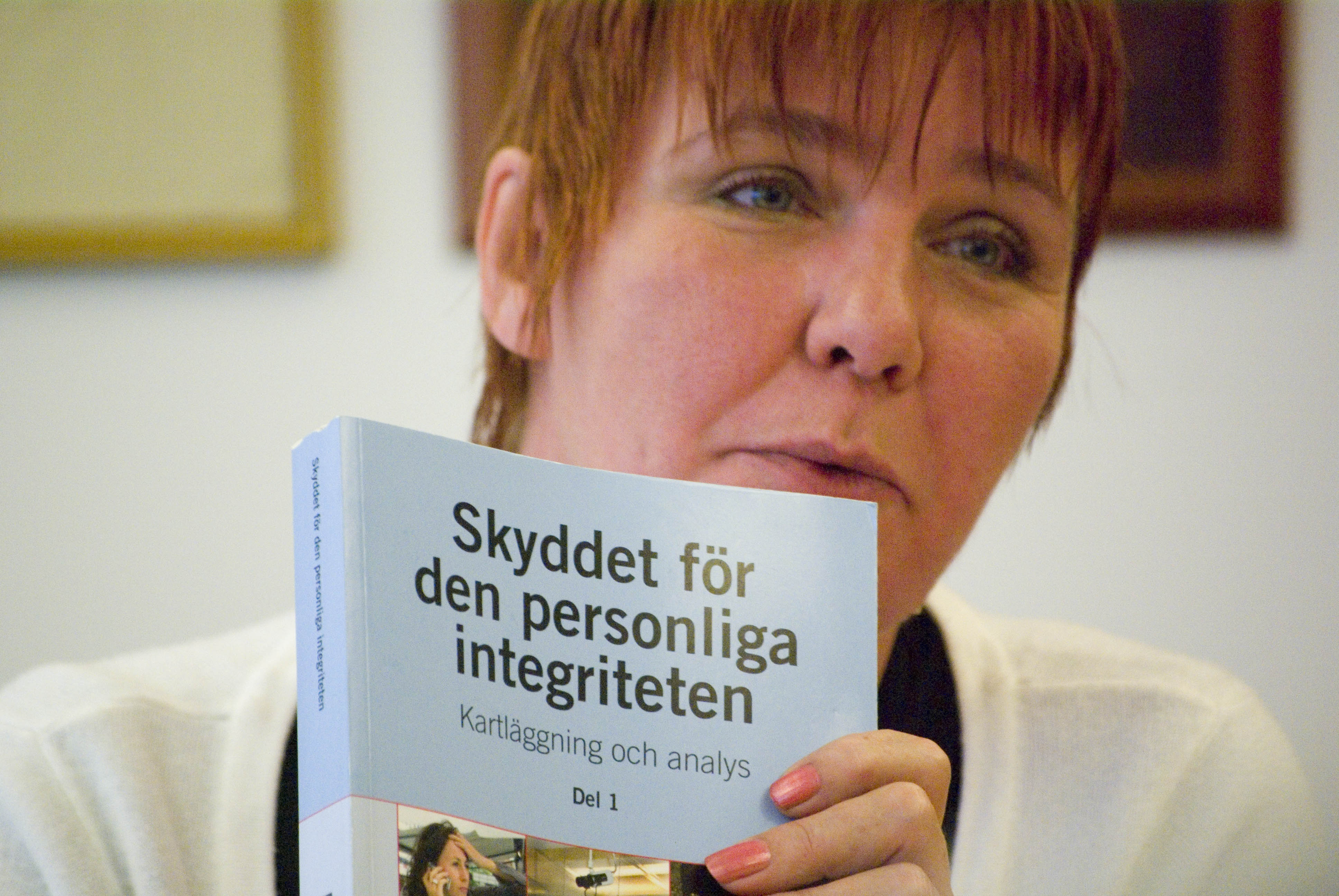
Alice Åström

Alice Åström (born 1959) is a Swedish Left Party politician. She was a member of the Riksdag from 1994 to 2010.
