= Torsten Bengtson =

Swedish politician (1914–1998)

Torsten Bengtson (10 January 1914 in Halmstad, – 4 May 1998) was a Swedish politician and member of the Centre Party.

He was a member of the Parliament of Sweden between 1950–82, in the upper house in the bicameral parliament 1950–70 and then in the new unicameral parliament 1971–82. Between 1971–79 he was the first vice speaker of the parliament. He was a delegate of the United Nations 1952–82 and member of the delegate of Sveriges Riksbank 1961–82.

Bengtson was behind a parliamentary bill that all cage birds should be released and pet birds in cage be banned. It was rejected but the publicity damaged his future political career and he rendered the nickname "Pippi-Bengtson" [Birdie Bengtsson].

His restrictive views on alcohol policy was the subject of parody by singer-songwriter Eddie Meduza in several of his songs, among others "Undanflykter", "Torsten hällde brännvin i ett glas åt Karin Söder" and "Mera Brännvin".

He is the father of tennis player Ove Bengtson.
