= Carina Hägg =

Swedish politician (born 1957)

member of the Riksdag
- In office 1995–2014

member of the Committee on Foreign Affairs
- In office 1996–2014

Representative of the Parliamentary Assembly of the Council of Europe
- In office 2010–2014

Personal details
- Born: 1957
- Political party: Swedish Social Democratic Party

Carina Hägg (born 1957) is a Swedish Social Democratic Party politician. She has been a member of the Riksdag since 1995. She is also a member of the AWEPA Governing Council.
