= Diana Laitinen Carlsson =

Swedish politician (born 1972)

Member of the Riksdag
- In office 1 September 2020 – 26 September 2022
- Constituency: Jönköping County

Personal details
- Born: 1972 (age 53–54)
- Party: Social Democrats

Diana Laitinen Carlsson (born 1972) is a Swedish politician. From September 2020 to September 2022, she served as Member of the Riksdag representing the constituency of Jönköping County.
