= Margareta Andersson =

Swedish politician (born 1948)

Margareta Andersson (born 1948) is a Swedish Centre Party politician. She was a member of the Riksdag from 1995 to 2006.
