= Göte Wahlström =

Swedish politician (born 1951)

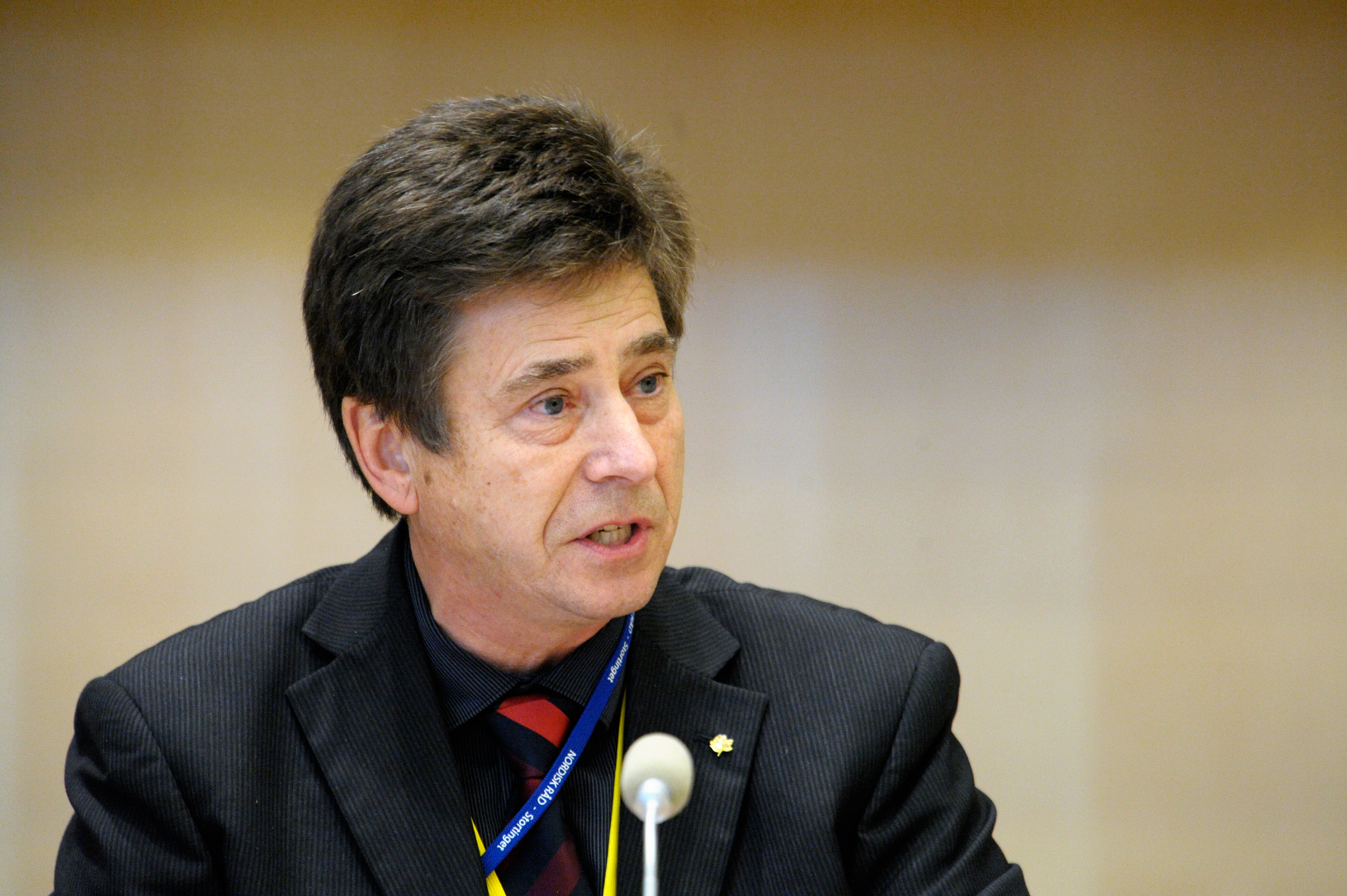
- Wahlström in November 2009

Member of the Riksdag
- In office 5 October 1998 – 4 October 2010
- Constituency: Jönköping County

Personal details
- Born: 1951 (age 74–75)
- Party: Social Democratic Party

Göte Wahlström (born 1951) is a Swedish politician and former member of the Riksdag, the national legislature. A member of the Social Democratic Party, he represented Jönköping County between October 1998 and October 2010.
