= 2022 Swedish local elections =

- September 11, 2022

All 12,614 seats in the municipal councils, and 1,720 seats in the regional councils
	Majority party	Minority party	Third party
Party	Social Democrats	Moderate	Sweden Democrats
Councillors	4,347	2,912	2,366
Councillors ±	▲72	▲202	▲336
	Fourth party	Fifth party	Sixth party
Party	Centre	Left	Christian Democrats
Councillors	1,333	958	888
Councillors ±	▼425	▲9	▲93
	Seventh party	Eighth party	Ninth party
Party	Liberals	Green	Others
Councillors	566	340	624
Councillors ±	▼217	▼103	▼29

The 2022 Swedish local elections were held on 11 September 2022 to elect the 21 regional councils and 290 municipal councils. These elections occurred concurrently with the general election.

== Background ==
Local government in Sweden is divided into two levels of democratic representation: the regional level and the municipal level. Both levels are governed by the Local Government Act (Kommunallagen) adopted in 1991. Regions and municipalities do not hold legislative powers; nonetheless, they do have executive powers in taxation (including the right to levy income taxes), and administration at their respective levels.

== Electoral system ==
Sweden uses a proportional representation system for all local elections. To vote in local elections, a person must be at least 18 years old. Unlike national elections, non-Swedish citizens can vote if they are EU citizens or if they have been registered residents in Sweden for at least three consecutive years. Seats are allocated using the Modified Sainte-Laguë method. A statutory threshold of 3% applies to regional council elections, while municipal elections have a threshold of either 2% or 3%, depending on the size of the electoral district.

== Regional Councils ==
Regional councils are responsible for healthcare, public transport, culture, and regional development. The political leadership of a region is headed by the Chair of the Regional Board (Regionstyrelsens ordförande), who is elected by each regional council via majority. The regional councils have a combined total of 1,720 seats.

Party	Votes	%	Seats	+/–
Social Democrats	2,032,541	31.68	576	+53
Moderate Party	1,224,210	19.08	328	+14
Sweden Democrats	958,137	14.94	275	+51
Left Party	570,603	8.89	147	+6
Christian Democrats	469,033	7.31	133	+14
Centre Party	405,148	6.32	120	–35
Liberals	295,120	4.60	57	–37
Green Party	207,072	3.23	31	–17
Others	253,509	3.95	53	–25
Total	6,415,373	100.00	1,720	–
Valid votes	6,415,373	98.21		
Invalid votes	8,105	0.12		
Blank votes	108,904	1.67		
Total votes	6,532,382	100.00		
Registered voters/turnout	8,147,190	80.18		
Source: val.se

=== Elected ===
Region	S	M	SD	V	KD	C	L	MP	Others	Total
Blekinge	21	11	15	3	4	3				57
Dalarna	29	16	14	6	6	7			5	83
Gävleborg	25	14	15	6	5	6			4	75
Halland	21	17	12	4	6	7	4			71
Jämtland	21	9	7	4	5	7		2		55
Jönköping	22	14	14	4	10	6	3		8	81
Kalmar	24	12	12	5	8	6				67
Kronoberg	21	13	10	5	5	4	3			61
Norrbotten	31	10	9	7	4	4			6	71
Skåne	44	33	30	12	9	7	8	6		149
Stockholm	50	31	16	18	10	9	9	6		149
Södermanland	26	15	14	5	5	4			10	79
Uppsala	31	18	14	12	9	7	5	5		101
Värmland	31	13	13	5	7	6	3		3	81
Västerbotten	27	12	6	9	5	6	3	3		71
Västernorrland	24	9	9	5	4	6			14	71
Västmanland	26	16	14	6	6	5	4			77
Västra Götaland	46	29	24	16	12	9	7	6		149
Örebro	24	14	11	6	5	5	3		3	71
Östergötland	32	22	16	9	8	6	5	3		101
Total	576	328	275	147	133	120	57	31	53	1,720
Source: val.se

== Municipal councils ==
The 290 municipal councils represent the most local level of government, responsible for local roads, schools, social services, urban planning, waste management and environmental protection. These elections will determine the distribution of approximately 12,614 seats nationwide. Following the elections, the new municipal councils will appoint municipal executive committees (kommunstyrelser).

Party	Votes	%	Seats	+/–
Social Democrats	1,904,957	29.31	3,771	+19
Moderate Party	1,332,813	20.51	2,584	+188
Sweden Democrats	945,258	14.55	2,091	+285
Left Party	535,882	8.25	811	+3
Centre Party	499,666	7.69	1,213	−390
Christian Democrats	348,420	5.36	755	+79
Liberals	340,251	5.24	509	−180
Green Party	248,448	3.82	309	−86
Others	342,997	5.28	571	−4
Total	6,498,692	100.00	12,614	−86
Valid votes	6,498,692	98.50		
Invalid votes	9,128	0.14		
Blank votes	89,870	1.36		
Total votes	6,597,690	100.00		
Registered voters/turnout	8,196,484	80.49		
Source: val.se

== Referendums ==
Three municipalities held referendums simultaneously with the municipal elections.

=== Halmstad Municipality ===
In Halmstad Municipality, the following question was asked:

Would you like to see a hotel with a restaurant and a market hall built at Österskans, as per the current proposal?

Choice	Votes	%
For	25,892	42.47
Against	35,075	57.53
Total	60,967	100.00
Valid votes	60,967	97.66
Invalid/blank votes	1,464	2.34
Total votes	62,431	100.00
Registered voters/turnout	82,095	76.05
Source: halmstad.se

=== Söderhamn Municipality ===
==== 1st Referendum ====
In Söderhamn Municipality, this was one of the questions asked:

Should Söderhamn Municipality allow wind power to be developed at Storgrundet?

Choice	Votes	%
For	4,904	35.33
Against	7,628	54.95
Abstain	1,350	9.72
Total	13,882	100.00
Valid votes	13,882	94.27
Invalid/blank votes	844	5.73
Total votes	14,726	100.00
Registered voters/turnout	20,503	71.82
Source: soderhamn.se

==== 2nd Referendum ====
This was the second question asked in Söderhamn Municipality:

Should Söderhamn Municipality allow wind power to be established within its territorial waters?

Choice	Votes	%
For	5,023	36.96
Against	7,085	52.13
Abstain	1,484	10.92
Total	13,592	100.00
Valid votes	13,592	92.30
Invalid/blank votes	1,134	7.70
Total votes	14,726	100.00
Registered voters/turnout	20,503	71.82
Source: soderhamn.se

=== Trelleborg Municipality ===
In Trelleborg Municipality, the following question was asked:

Should the approach to the Port of Trelleborg be from the east or the west?

Choice	Votes	%
East	10,507	43.71
West	9,845	40.95
Abstain	3,688	15.34
Total	24,040	100.00
Valid votes	24,040	97.56
Invalid/blank votes	600	2.44
Total votes	24,640	100.00
Registered voters/turnout	36,415	67.66
Source: trelleborg.se
