= Margareta Persson =

Swedish politician (1945–2015)

member of the Riksdag
- In office 1994–2010

Personal details
- Political party: Swedish Social Democratic Party

Margareta Persson (1945 – 18 March 2015) was a Swedish social democratic politician from Jonköping. She had been a member of the Riksdag since 1994.
