= Ilan de Basso =

Swedish politician

Ilan De Basso
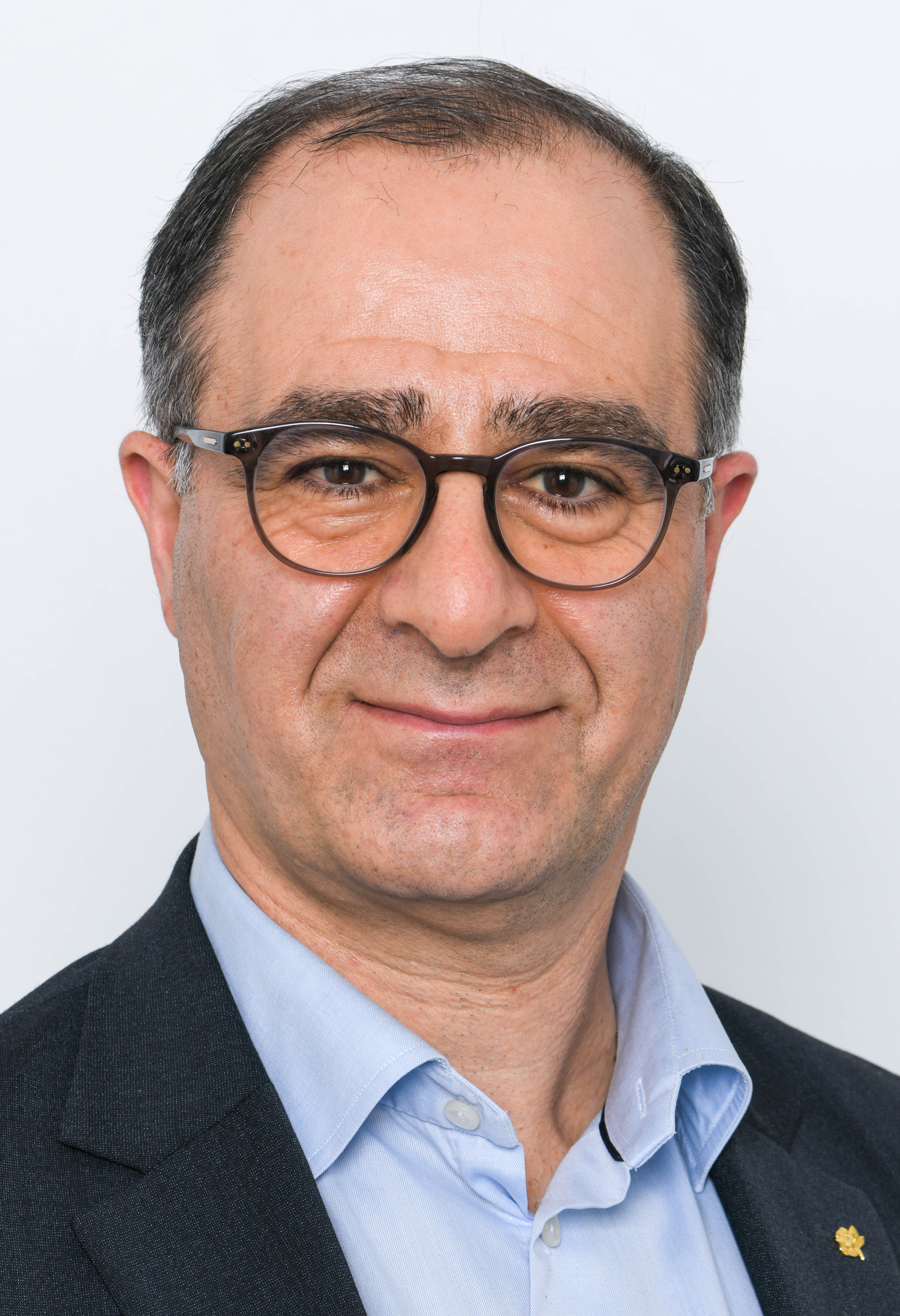

Member of the European Parliament
- In office 2021-2024
- Constituency: Sweden

Personal details
- Party: Swedish Social Democratic Party

Ilan de Basso (born 1 October 1969) is a Turkish-born ethnic Assyrian Swedish politician from the Social Democratic Party.

Ilan De Basso grew up in Stockholm and Örebro. He moved to his current hometown Jönköping in the late 1990s and has worked as a policy analyst, at the NGO Save the Children Fund, and at the Swedish Public Employment Service. He was previously a counsellor in Jönköping Municipality for 11 years, where he was responsible for education, labour market and care issues.

Ilan De Basso became a member of European Parliament on 13 December 2021, where he is a member of the Committee on Employment and Social Affairs and substitute for the committee on budgets as well as the committee on development.

== Political career ==
Since 2013, he is a member of the Swedish Social Democratic Party's national board.

In 2021, he replaced Johan Danielsson in the European Parliament when he was appointed to the Andersson Cabinet.

He was elected a Member of the Riksdag in the 2022 Swedish general election.
