= Martin Nilsson (politician) =

Swedish politician (born 1969)

Martin Nilsson (born 1969) is a Swedish social democratic politician, member of the Riksdag 1992–2006.
