= Kommunstyrelse =

The Kommunstyrelse ("municipal board") is the executive branch of local government in each of the 290 municipalities of Sweden. The term used in the English version of the Swedish Local Government Act is municipal executive committee. But there are also other translations used by particular municipalities.

The executive committee is appointed by the municipal assembly (kommunfullmäktige).

The chairman of the committee is one of the (sometimes the only) municipal commissioners (kommunalråd) and is often considered the mayor of the municipality, although there is no official office of mayor in Sweden.

The word is also used in bilingual Finland for the Finnish term kunnanhallitus.

== See also ==
- Municipalities of Sweden
