= Seal of New York =

Seal of New York may refer to:

- Seal of New York (state)
- Seal of New York City
