= Jonas Bronck =

Namesake of Bronx, New York

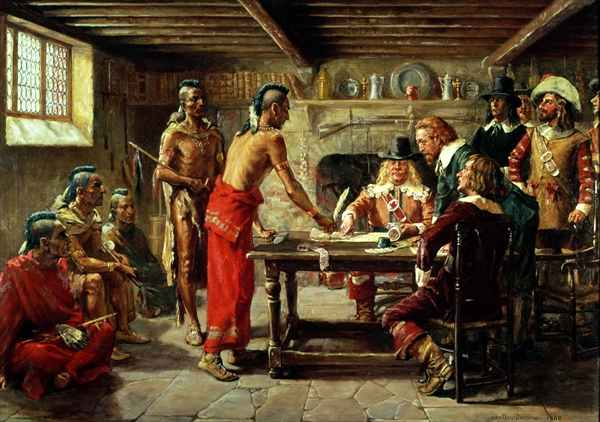
Signing the Treaty with the Indians April 22, 1642, painted in 1908 by John Ward Dunsmore

Jonas Bronck (alternatively Jonas Jonsson Brunk, Jonas Jonasson Bronk, or Jonas Jonassen Bronck) (around 1600 – 1643) was a settler in the Dutch colony of New Netherland after whom the Bronx River, and by extension, the county and New York City borough of the Bronx are named.

== Origin ==
Different theories account for Bronck's origin. The official historian of the Bronx, Lloyd Ultan, has adopted the theory that Bronck came from Sweden. The Bronx County Historical Society and other publications followed suit.

A number of sources published in the early 20th century identify Bronck as Swedish, an idea espoused by A. J. F. van Laer, archivist at the New York State Library. Gotham: A History of New York City to 1898, winner of the 1999 Pulitzer Prize for History, also parenthetically claims Bronck as a Dane. A 1908 publication portrays Bronck as a Mennonite who fled the Netherlands to Sweden because of religious persecution. In a 1977 pamphlet commemorating the founding of the borough a publication of the Bronx County Bar Association states that it "is widely accepted that Bronck came from Sweden, but claims have also been made by the Frisian Islands on the North Sea coast and by a small town in Germany".

In 1981, the Manx-Svenska Publishing Co. released a now out-of-print 19-page pamphlet, The Founder of the Bronx, authored G. V. C. Young O.B.E., after he had conducted research in the Netherlands, Sweden, and New York. Young reported that he examined crucial references: Bronck's betrothal certificate dated June 18, 1638, and Bronck's document of guarantee from April 30, 1639. The theories of Bronck's Swedish origin fundamentally rely on Young's interpretations of three key words found in these Dutch-language documents and that Jonas Bronck's relative Pieter Bronck was born in 1616 in Jönköping, Sweden. In conjunction with John Davidson of Tórshavn in the Faroe Islands and Eva Brylla from the Ortnamnsarkiv in Uppsala, Sweden, the archival texts were transcribed from their traditional script. Young states that Bronck's middle name Jonsson means that his father's first name was Jonas (excluding the Faroe reverend Morten Bronck) and further that the words referring to Bronck's birthplace and spelled "Coonstay" and "Smolach" speaks for that it is most likely that "Coonstay" was Komstad in Jönköping county and that "Smolach" was a misrecording of Småland, the province in which Jönköping is located. Young concludes Jonas Bronck was born circa 1600 in Komstad, Småland, a historic province of Sweden. This farm or small village was at this time inhabited by Jon Nilsson and his wife Marit Brunk who could be Jonas Bronck's parents or other relatives. The New York Times cites Sävsjö the seat of Sävsjö Municipality in Jönköping County, Sweden, of which Komstad was part.

== Marriage ==
On June 18, 1638, Bronck signed his banns of marriage as Jonas Jonasson Bronck. This patronym indicated that his father's name was Jonas, which supports the theory of Swedish origin. He and his Dutch wife, Teuntje Joriaens, married at the New Church in Amsterdam on July 6, 1638.

== Immigration to New Netherland ==
Jonas Bronck's decision to relocate from Europe was prompted by a number of factors.

During the late 1630s, events in both Holland and America induced significant changes in the governance of New Netherland, territory controlled by the Dutch West India Company (WIC) between the Delaware and Connecticut rivers, and north along tidewaters of the Hudson. At its heart was the trading facility of New Amsterdam on the southern tip of Manhattan Island.

Following the spectacular collapse of the Tulip mania in 1637, Holland's government contemplated the idea of taking control of New Netherland from the company and using the colony for resettlement of individuals impoverished by failed tulip bulb speculations. There also was vexation over the West India Company's failure to develop New Netherland much beyond its original function, facilitating the fur trade. By contrast, English enclaves in the region were rapidly expanding in territory, population, and viability.

New Amsterdam's inhabitants then numbered only about four hundred, a count that hardly had increased during the previous decade. Company properties in the colony showed signs of physical neglect and conditions of law and order were less than ideal. Faced with possible government expropriation, the company appointed Willem Kieft as director of New Netherland with a mandate to increase the territory's population and vitality. Arriving in 1638, Kieft promptly purchased additional Lenape lands in the environs of Manhattan and encouraged private settlement by enterprising colonists of diverse backgrounds. It also liberalized the previous Charter of Freedoms and Exemptions so that settlers were no longer encumbered with excessive responsibilities to the WIC. Previously, most real estate and commercial activity in New Netherland had been under its direct control.

These vicissitudes did not escape Bronck's notice. He was among the first to recognize promising opportunities, and along with various emigrants from Europe he crossed the Atlantic to settle in New Amsterdam's hinterlands. Vriessendael and Colen Donck were established around the same time.

In the spring of 1639, Jonas Bronck and a party of other emigrants, including his good friend, the Dane Jochem Pietersen Kuyter, departed the Dutch port of Hoorn on the Zuiderzee. In addition to passengers and crew, their ship, "De Brandt van Troyen" (Fire of Troy), was laden with numerous cattle. On June 16, the vessel was seen in the harbor of New Amsterdam.

== Site of homestead ==
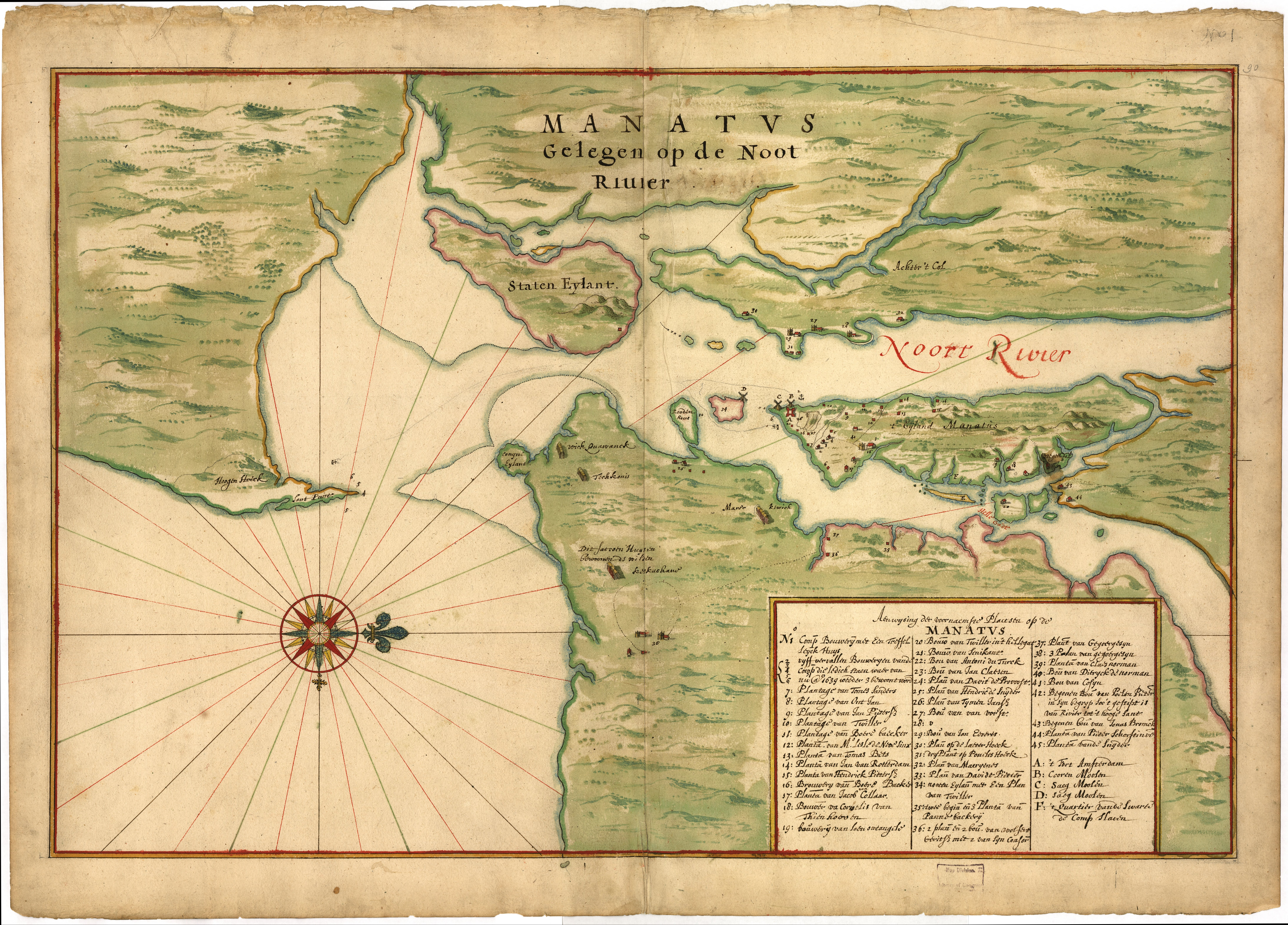
Map (c. 1639) Manhattan situated on the North Rivier with numbered key showing settlements with No. 43 representing the Bronck homestead; No. 42, across the Harlem River, represents that of Kuyter, who had sailed with Bronck and took the land on the Manhattan side of the river.

Bronck and Kuyter navigated up the East River to land that was within the territory of the Siwanoy and Wecquaesgeek groups of Wappinger who inhabited it at the time of colonialization. It is said that Bronck wrote of his new home: "The invisible hand of the Almighty Father, surely guided me to this beautiful country, a land covered with virgin forest and unlimited opportunities. It is a veritable paradise and needs but the industrious hand of man to make it the finest and most beautiful region in all the world." Kuyter chose land on the west bank on the island of Manhattan; Bronck settled on the mainland. Teuntje and Jonas Bronck's house was built by a promontory at the juncture of the Harlem River and the Bronx Kill across from Randalls Island and was constructed like "a miniature fort with stone walls and a tile roof". Bronck's farmstead consisted of approximately 274 hectares (680 acres), which being a religious man, he named Emaus. (Emmaus, according to the New Testament, is where Jesus appeared before two of his followers after his resurrection.) The site is in present-day Mott Haven, about 1,000 feet south of Bruckner Boulevard and 500 feet east of the Willis Avenue Bridge, on a tract (at approximately 40°48′13″N 73°55′33″W) now part of the Harlem River Intermodal Yard, through which runs the Oak Point Link.

== Relations with Lenape tribes ==
On April 22, 1642, a peace treaty was signed at Bronck's homestead between Dutch authorities and the Wecquaesgeek sachems Ranaqua and Tackamuck. This event is portrayed in a painting by the American artist John Ward Dunsmore (1856–1945).

On February 23, 1643, Director of New Netherland William Kieft launched an attack on refugee camps of the Weckquaesgeek and Tappan. Expansionist Mahican and Mohawk in the North (armed with guns traded by the French and English) had driven them south the year before, where they sought protection from the Dutch. Kieft refused aid despite the company's previous guarantees to the tribes to provide it. The attacks were at Communipaw (in today's Jersey City) and Corlaers Hook (lower Manhattan) in what is known as the Pavonia Massacre. The slaughter led to retaliation and attacks on many settlements outlying New Amsterdam, including some in what is now the Bronx, such as that of Anne Hutchinson. It is unknown if Bronck's death was related to the skirmishes.

== Last testament ==
Saturday May 6, 1643, not long after Jonas Bronck's death, his widow Teuntje Joriaens, together with Peter Bronck, conducted a formal inventory of the Bronck farm which was then known as Emaus. This procedure was conducted in the presence of the Rev. Everardus Bogardus, pastor of the First Reformed Dutch Church of New Amsterdam and Bronck's friend Jochem Pietersen Kuyter. According to official records of the State of New York, the latter two were identified as guardians of Bronck's widow. (In June 1643 Teuntje remarried. She and her new husband, Arent van Curler, soon thereafter departed for Beverwyck, a settlement on the North River near Fort Orange.)

The inventory lists contents of the farm Bronck and his family had built in the wilderness during the period of less than four years following his arrival in America. Buildings on the property were a stone house with a tile roof, a barn, two barracks for farm employees, and a tobacco house. The tally of Bronck's livestock was 25 animals of various kinds, plus an uncounted number of hogs, said to be running in nearby woods.

During the early 1640s, it was not uncommon for Bronck's New Amsterdam contemporaries to identify themselves on legal documents with graphic marks that also were symbols of illiteracy. By contrast, Jonas Bronck's personal library provides evidence he was literate in four languages, suggesting his education might have been as high as university level. His library was an impressive archive for its time and place, and is regarded as the earliest for which there is a detailed account in the colonial records of New York.

The following materials were listed in the inventory of Bronck's library: one Bible, folio; Calvin's Institutes, folio; Bullingeri, Schultetus Dominicalia, (Medical); Moleneri Praxis, (Moral and Practical Discourses), quarto; one German Bible, quarto; Mirror of the Sea (Seespiegel), folio; one Luther's Psalter; Sledani, (History of the Reformation), folio; Danish chronicle, quarto; Danish law book, quarto; Luther's Complete Catechism; The Praise of Christ, quarto; Petri Apiani; Danish child's book; a book called Forty Pictures of Death, by Symon Golaert; Biblical stories; Danish calendar; Survey (or View) of the Great Navigation; a parcel of eighteen Dutch and Danish pamphlets by various authors; seventeen books in manuscript, which are old; and eleven pictures, large and small.

== Bronck's becomes Bronx ==
Bronck's farm, a tract of 274 hectares (680 acres), known as the biblical Emmaus, Bronck's Land, and then just Broncksland, or simply Bronck's— covered roughly the area emanating from general vicinity of Willis Avenue and 132nd Street in the Bronx in what, today, is Mott Haven.

Following Bronck's death, and the dispersion of the few settlers, the tract passed through the hands of successive Dutch traders until 1664, when it came into the possession of Samuel Edsall, (who also had acquired a large tract on the North River known as the English Neighborhood), who held it until 1670. He sold it to Captain Richard Morris and Colonel Lewis Morris, at the time merchants of Barbados. Four years later, Colonel Morris obtained a royal patent to Bronck's Land, which afterward became the Manor of Morrisania, the second Lewis (son of Captain Richard), exercising proprietary right.

Despite Bronck having lived there for only four years, the area was known as "Broncksland" through the end of the 17th century. The current spelling came into use in 1697.

== Descendants and relations ==
Pieter Bronck also was known as Pieter Jonasson Bronck. Given the relative closeness in age and same father's name indicated by the patronym (Jonas was born about 1600, Pieter, born in 1616 in Jönköping, Sweden) it has been claimed that Pieter was a nephew or cousin to Jonas Bronck, and not a son as had been surmised. This would however in both cases mean that Jonas Bronck or his father Jonas have had a living brother with identical name, something which is unheard of in Scandinavian naming. They might instead have been brothers, as an age difference of 16 years among even full siblings is far from unlikely. Still he has been described as the "poorer cousin", and is believed to have emigrated to Beverwijck in the Hudson Valley circa 1650. The Pieter Bronck House is a registered historic place in Coxsackie, New York. The American poet William Bronk reported that he was a descendant of Pieter Bronck. The American biophysicist (and president of Rockefeller University) Detlev Bronk claimed to have been a Bronck descendant, but no evidence of lineage to Pieter's line was ever found or indicated.

== Legacy ==
=== Bronx County flag ===
Flag of The Bronx

The Bronx County flag has a horizontal tricolor (the top band is orange, the middle band is white, and the band at the bottom is blue) similar to the historical Dutch tricolor. In the center of the flag is a laurel wreath denoting honor and fame. The wreath encircles the Bronck family arms. The shield of the family arms shows the face of the sun with rays displayed rising from the sea, signifying peace, liberty, and commerce. The crest of the arms is an eagle or an auk facing eastward and with its wings expanded, representing "the hope of the New World while not forgetting the Old." The text underneath the shield is also the motto of the borough, and reads "ne cede malis", which is a Latin phrase meaning "Yield not to evil".

=== Mural ===
A mural at the Bronx County Courthouse depicting Bronck's arrival was created in the early 1930s by James Monroe Hewlett.

=== Namesakes ===
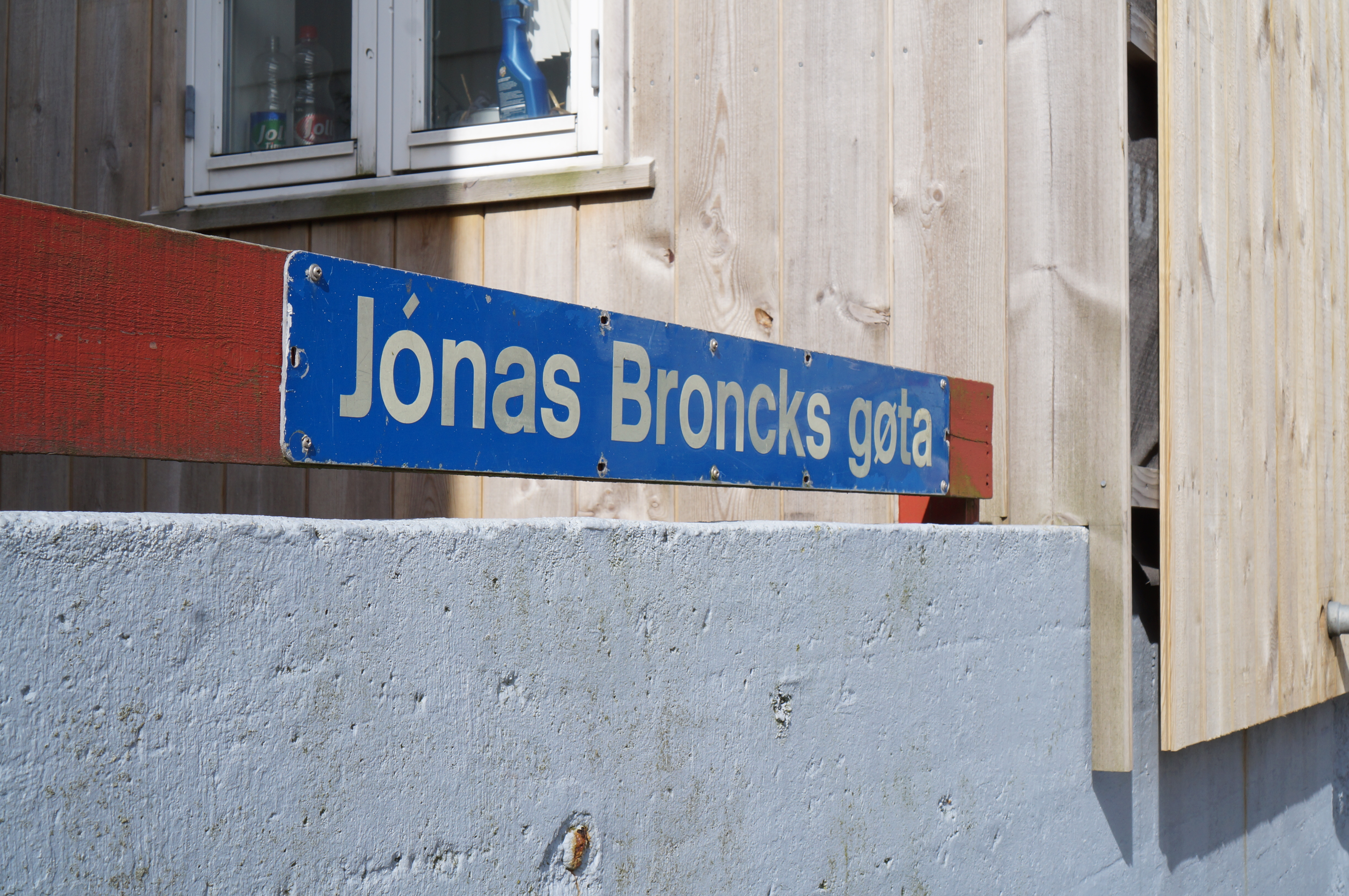
Jónas Broncks gøta, Tórshavn, the Faroe Islands

The town of Tórshavn, the capital of the Faroe Islands, has a street bearing the name Jónas Broncksgøta (Jonas Bronck's Street). One theory holds that Jonas Jonsson Bronck was born ca. 1600, son of a Lutheran minister, Morten Jespersen Bronck, and was raised in Tórshavn. That Jonas Bronck's middle name would in this case be Mortensen, not Jonsson, speaks against this theory. The Faroe family may have originated from the Norwegian district of Elverum. (At the time, the Faroe Islands were part of a political entity also comprising Iceland, Greenland, Denmark and Norway.) In 1619 the younger Bronck went to school in Roskilde, Denmark, and eventually made his way to Holland.

The Jonas Bronck Academy and Public School 43 Jonas Bronck are located in the Bronx. A local brewery produces Jonas Bronck Beer.

=== Jonas Bronck Center ===
There is a Jonas Bronck Center in Sävsjö, Sweden. where a celebration of the 375th anniversary of Jonas Bronck's settlement of the Bronx took place in August 2014. The celebration was mainly the idea of Brian G. Andersson, the former commissioner of the New York City Department of Records and Information Services, a specialist in Bronck's genealogy, a founding director of the center, and a Bronxite of Swedish origin.

== See also ==
- New Netherland settlements

== Sources ==
- Benson, Adolph B. and Naboth Hedin, eds. Swedes in America, 1638-1938 (The Swedish American Tercentenary Association. New Haven, CT: Yale University Press. 1938) ISBN 978-0-8383-0326-9
