= List of New York City historical anniversaries =

A number of New York City historical anniversaries have been commemorated as civic events by centennials and at similar landmark dates. Several of these could be considered founding myths of the city, though there have been disagreements on when it was actually "founded". For example, the Seal of New York City has been variously marked by the years 1686, 1664 and 1625 over its history, by steps attributing an earlier founding date. Sometimes these anniversaries have occasioned major celebrations, and sometimes not.

== Years commemorated ==
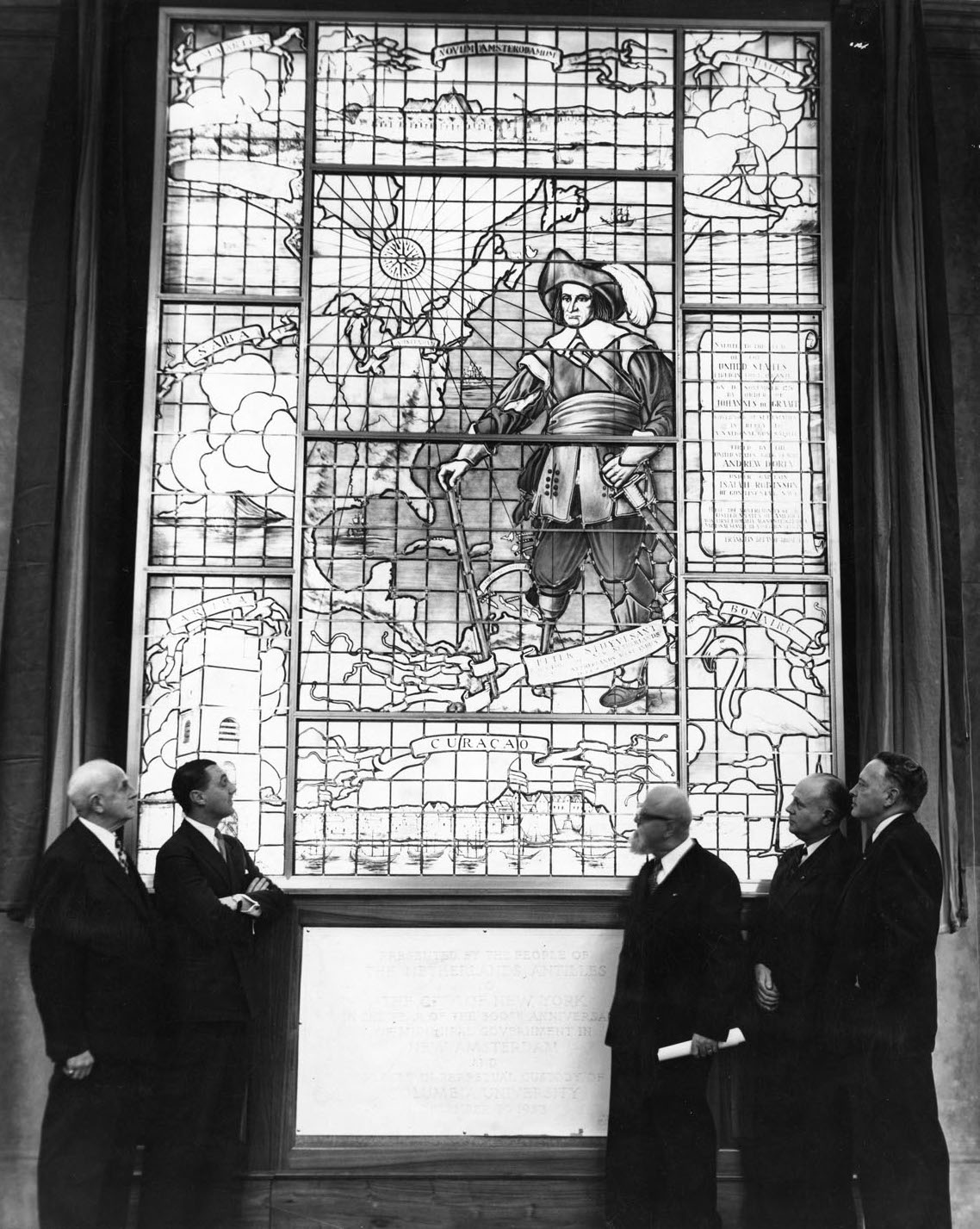
The 1954 unveiling of a stained-glass depiction of Peter Stuyvesant in Butler Library at Columbia University, a gift of the Netherlands Antilles. It commemorated the 300th anniversary of the founding of New Amsterdam, though it was actually dedicated on its 329th anniversary according to the date on the Seal of New York City, or on the 301st anniversary of the city receiving municipal rights.

=== Before English conquest ===
- 1609, September 12: Henry Hudson and his Halve Maen arrive at Hudson River

- 300th anniversary: Hudson–Fulton Celebration
- 400th anniversary: NY400 and New Amsterdam Plein and Pavilion

- 1614, October 11: New Netherland Company founded

- 300th anniversary: Commercial Tercentenary

- 1623, June 20: Dutch West India Company secures province status for New Netherland

- 1624, May: Cornelius Jacobsen May and WIC ship New Netherland arrive at Hudson River with first settlers to Governors Island (and also Fort Orange), as planned by Jessé de Forest

- 300th anniversary: Huguenot-Walloon New Netherland Commission, including Walloon Settlers Memorial at the Battery and Huguenot-Walloon half dollar

- 1625: Fort Amsterdam built as new seat of government of New Netherland at site chosen and designed by Cryn Fredericks under Willem Verhulst, and cattle transferred from Governors Island

- Date marked on 1975 flag and 1977 seal
- 350th anniversary: update of city flag and city seal after Paul O'Dwyer campaign

- 1626, May 24: Peter Minuit and his "purchase" of Manhattan

- 300th anniversary: Netherland Monument at the Battery

- 1653, February 2: New Amsterdam municipal rights after lobbying by Adriaen van der Donck

- 300th anniversary: Peter Minuit Plaza and Shorakapok Rock

=== After English conquest ===
- 1664, September 6: Conquest of New Netherland and Articles of Surrender of New Netherland

- Date marked on 1915 flag and seal
- 300th anniversary: 1964 New York World's Fair

- 1665, June 24: Thomas Willett first mayor of City of New York

- 250th anniversary: establishment of city flag and update of city seal

- 1686, April 27: Dongan Charter

- Date marked on 1686 seal
- establishment of first locally-approved city seal

- 1783, November 25: Evacuation Day

- 100th anniversary: Evacuation Day Centennial and George Washington at Federal Hall

- 1789, April 30: First inauguration of George Washington

- 100th anniversary: Washington Square Arch
- 150th anniversary: 1939 New York World's Fair

- 1898, January 1: City of Greater New York

- 25th anniversary: Silver Jubilee, civic, industrial and fraternal parades, and Municipal Educational Exposition at Grand Central Palace
- 50th anniversary: Golden Jubilee, "New York at Work" parade, Grand Central Palace exhibition, Idlewild Airport opening
- 75th anniversary: Diamond Jubilee, subject of Intro 475 protest by Gay Activists Alliance
- 100th anniversary: Greater New York Centennial
