= Komstad =

Dorp in Småland, Sweden

Coordinates: 57.40173°N 14.60925°E

Komstad is a village in the former Norra Ljunga Parish, Småland, Sweden, suited about 4 kilometres (2.5 mi) west of Sävsjö town.

It is an old village, mentioned in historical records as early as 1370.

Recent research tries to document that Jonas Bronck (c. 1600 – c. 1643), who gave name to The Bronx, New York, United States, was born in Komstad.

Komstad was previously the location for the parish's Thing and was the main village in Västra Härad (western part of Njudung). But when the railroad was constructed in the 1860s, nearby Sävsjö became the new main town in the region.
