= Vrigstad =

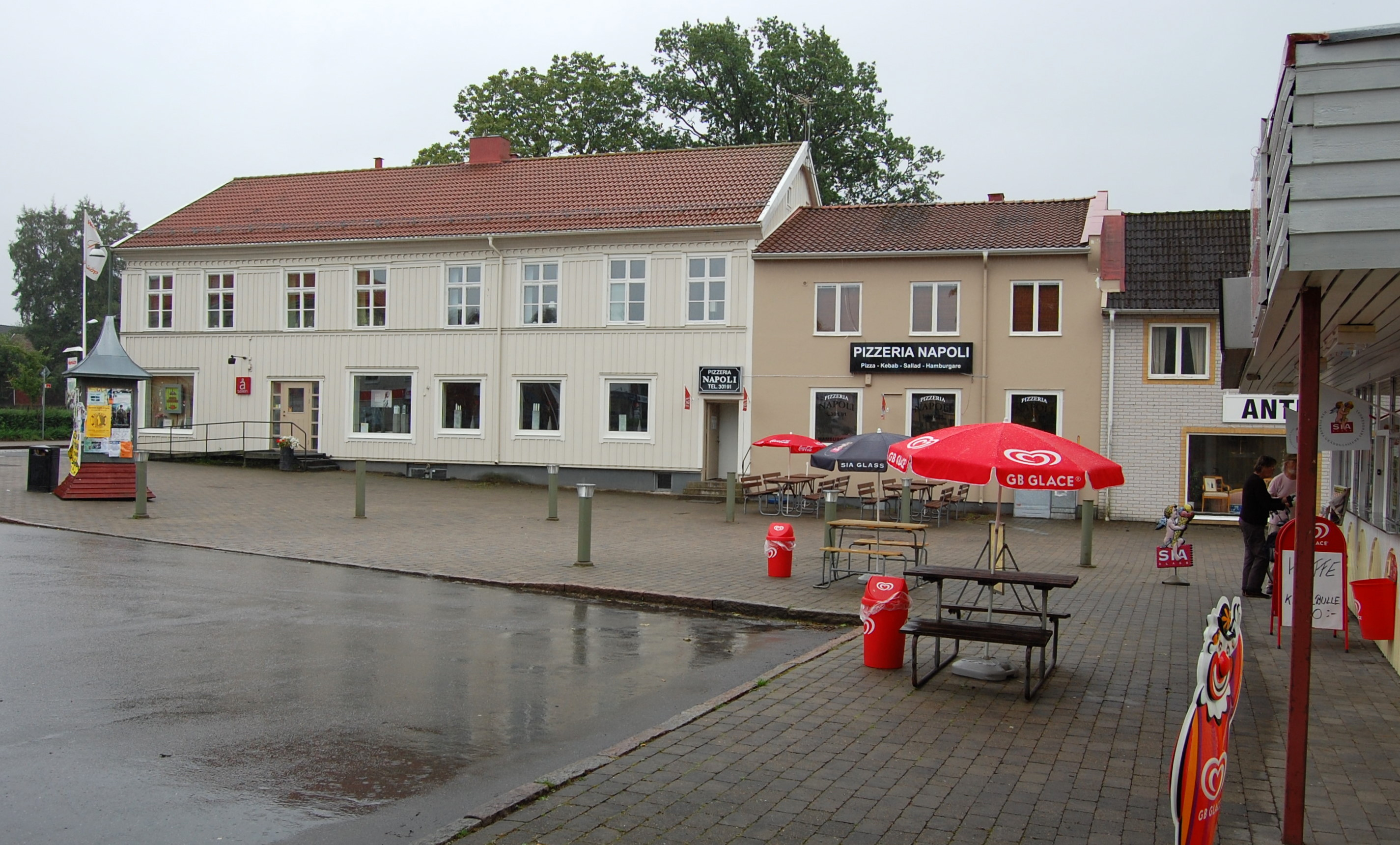

- Location within Jönköping Location within Sweden
- Coordinates: 57°21′N 14°28′E
- Country: Sweden
- Province: Småland
- County: Jönköping County
- Municipality: Sävsjö Municipality

Area
  - Total: 1.97 km^{2} (0.76 sq mi)

Population (31 December 2010)
  - Total: 1,421
  - Density: 720/km^{2} (1,900/sq mi)
- Time zone: UTC+1 (CET)
  - Summer (DST): UTC+2 (CEST)

Vrigstad (Swedish pronunciation: [ˈvrɪ̂kːsta]) is a locality situated in Sävsjö Municipality, Jönköping County, Sweden with 1,421 inhabitants in 2010.
