= Rörvik =

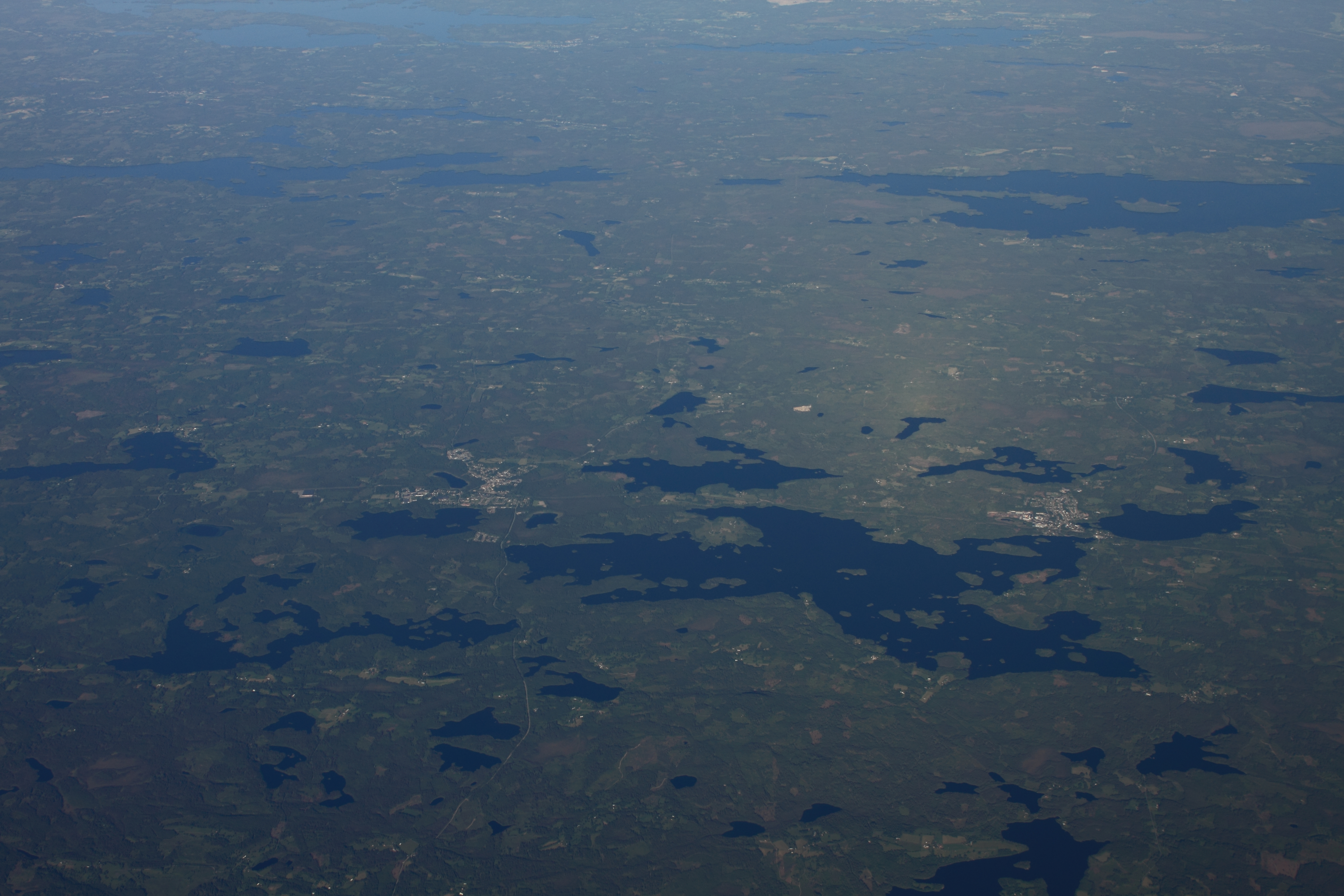
- Rörvik and Lammhult seen from an aeroplane.

- Location within Jönköping Location within Sweden
- Coordinates: 57°14′N 14°35′E
- Country: Sweden
- Province: Småland
- County: Jönköping County
- Municipality: Sävsjö Municipality

Area
  - Total: 0.93 km^{2} (0.36 sq mi)

Population (31 December 2010)
  - Total: 523
  - Density: 565/km^{2} (1,460/sq mi)
- Time zone: UTC+1 (CET)
  - Summer (DST): UTC+2 (CEST)

Rörvik is a locality situated in Sävsjö Municipality, Jönköping County, Sweden with 523 inhabitants in 2010.
