= Flags of New York City =

City of New York
- Proportion: 3∶5
- Adopted: April 6, 1915 (modified December 30, 1977)
- Design: A vertical tricolor of blue, white, and orange with a modified blue version of the Seal of New York City in the center

The flags of New York City include the flag of New York City, the respective flags of the boroughs of The Bronx, Brooklyn, Manhattan, Queens, and Staten Island, and flags of certain city departments. The city flag is a vertical tricolor in blue, white, and orange and charged in the center bar with the seal of New York City in blue. The tricolor design is derived from the flag of the Republic of the Seven United Netherlands—the Prince's Flag—as used in New Amsterdam in 1625, when that city became the capital of New Netherland.

== History ==
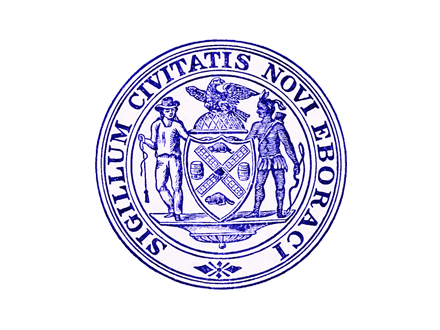
Unofficial flag featuring the then-current city seal, used before the official flag of 1915

For the first few hundred years of its existence, the City of New York lacked an official flag. First mention of a city flag was in 1824, it was described as bearing the city's coat of arms. Another early mention of one was by The New York Herald in 1856. During the Civil War the 10th New York Infantry Regiment was given a blue regimental flag that bore the state seal in the front and the city's seal in the back. By the end of the 19th century, the city was flying an unofficial flag featuring its seal in blue on a white field.

In 1914, to commemorate the 250th anniversary of the installation of the first mayor under English rule, the City Art Commission appointed a blue-ribbon committee to create the city's first official seal and flag. The committee consulted with the New-York Historical Society to study historical seals used by city government under the Dutch and English, to incorporate their symbolism into the new city seal and flag.

The committee described their proposed flag this way:

In our flag, the colors are Dutch, the arms are English, the crest is distinctively American, but the flag as such is the flag of the City, which has grown from these beginnings to be the home of all nations, the great cosmopolitan city of the world, the City of New York. — Committee of the Art Commission Associates, Seal and Flag of the City of New York, p. 84

The flag was approved on April 6, 1915, and first unveiled to the public on June 24.

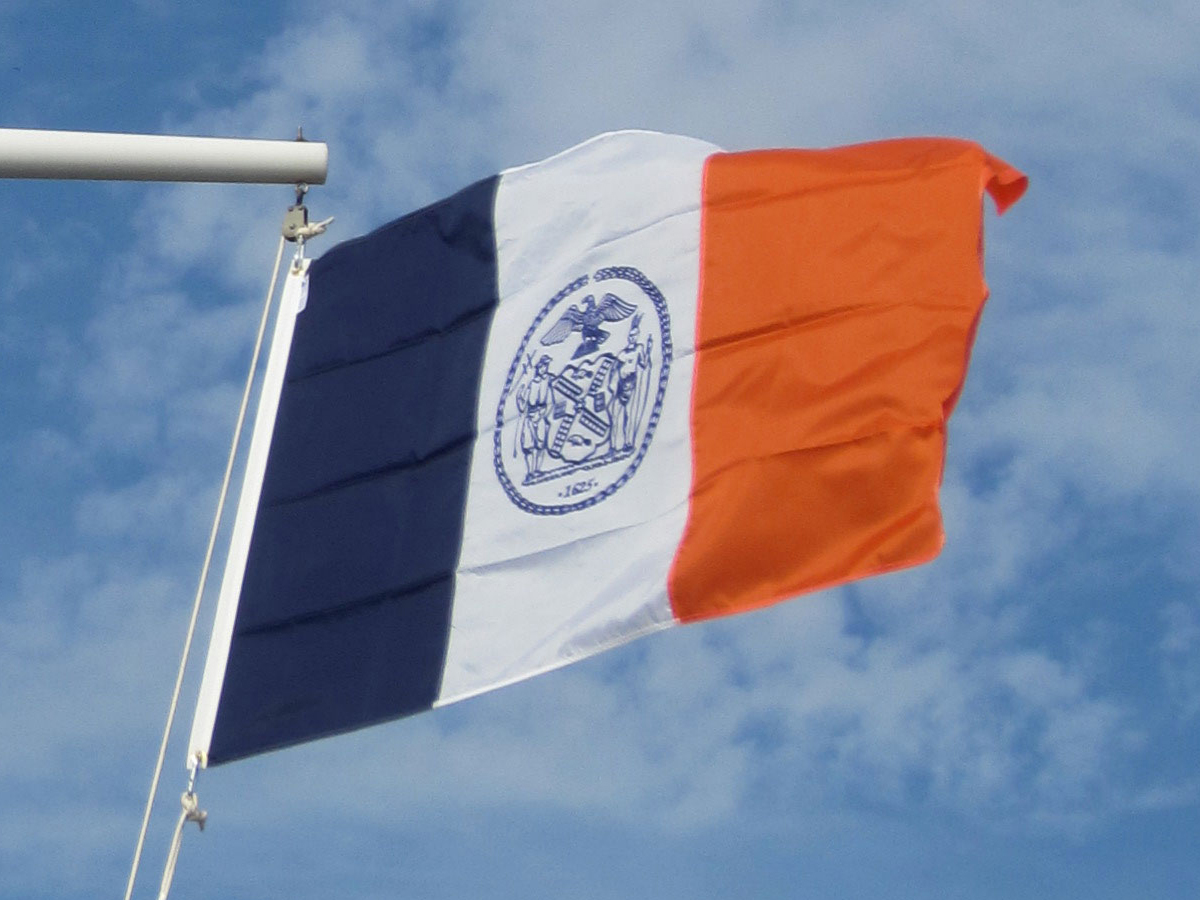
The flag unfurled and fluttering, mounted on a city park yardarm

The current design dates from December 30, 1977, when the seal was subtly modified. The date was changed from 1664 (when the Kingdom of England took possession) to 1625. The change was proposed by the Irish-born Paul O'Dwyer, president of the City Council, to emphasize the Dutch contributions to the city's history and downplay the British legacy. The choice of date was controversial at the time; an aide to First Deputy Mayor James A. Cavanagh concluded: "In researching the validity of this proposal, I find no basis for 1625 as the founding date." An aide to then-mayor Abe Beame suggested that 1624 would be a more accurate date, as that was when the city was actually chartered as a legal Dutch entity. Author Edwin G. Burrows had another perspective on the debate, saying "You have to wonder if they didn't pick either 1626 or 1625 just to beat Boston, settled in 1630." Nonetheless, the mayor signed O'Dwyer's legislation.

== Design ==
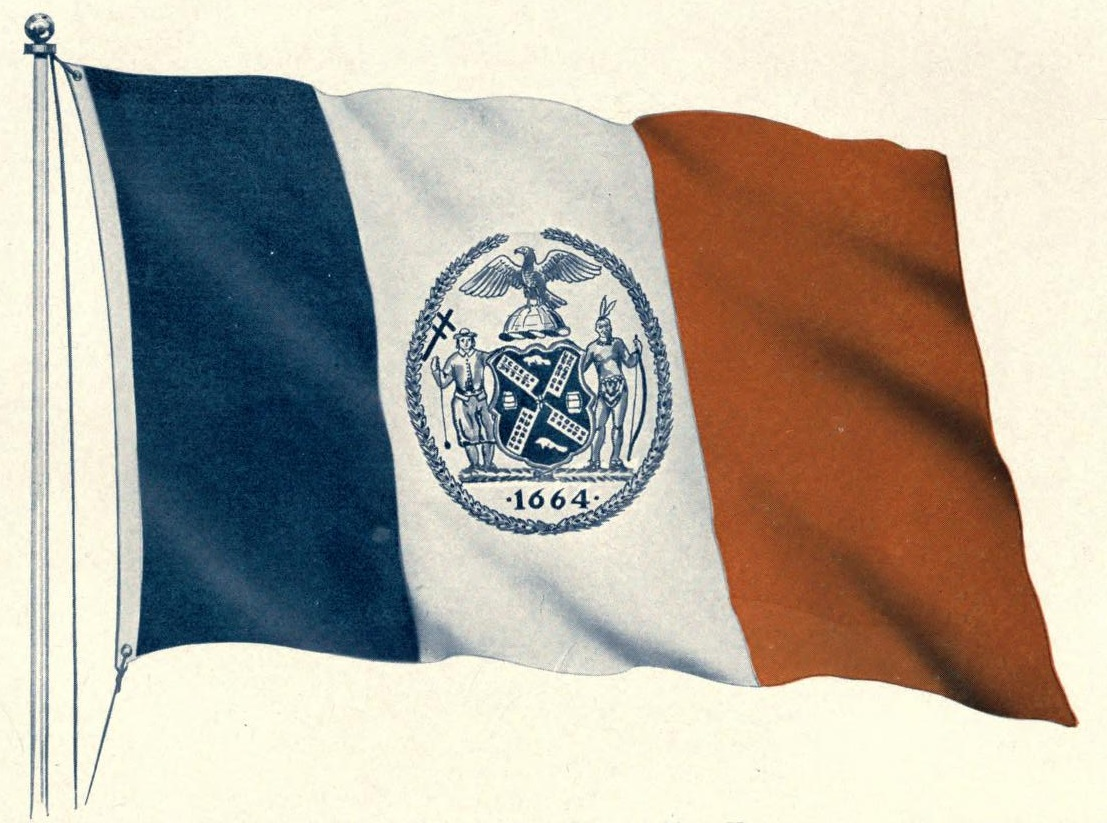
The city's first official flag, 1915

Section 2-103 of the New York City Administrative Code ("Official city flag") establishes the design as follows:

A flag combining the colors orange, white and blue arranged in perpendicular bars of equal dimensions (the blue being nearest to the flagstaff) with the standard design of the seal of the city in blue upon the middle, or white bar, omitting the legend Sigillum Civitatis Novi Eboraci, which colors shall be the same as those of the flag of the United Netherlands in use in the year sixteen hundred twenty-five.

=== Colors ===
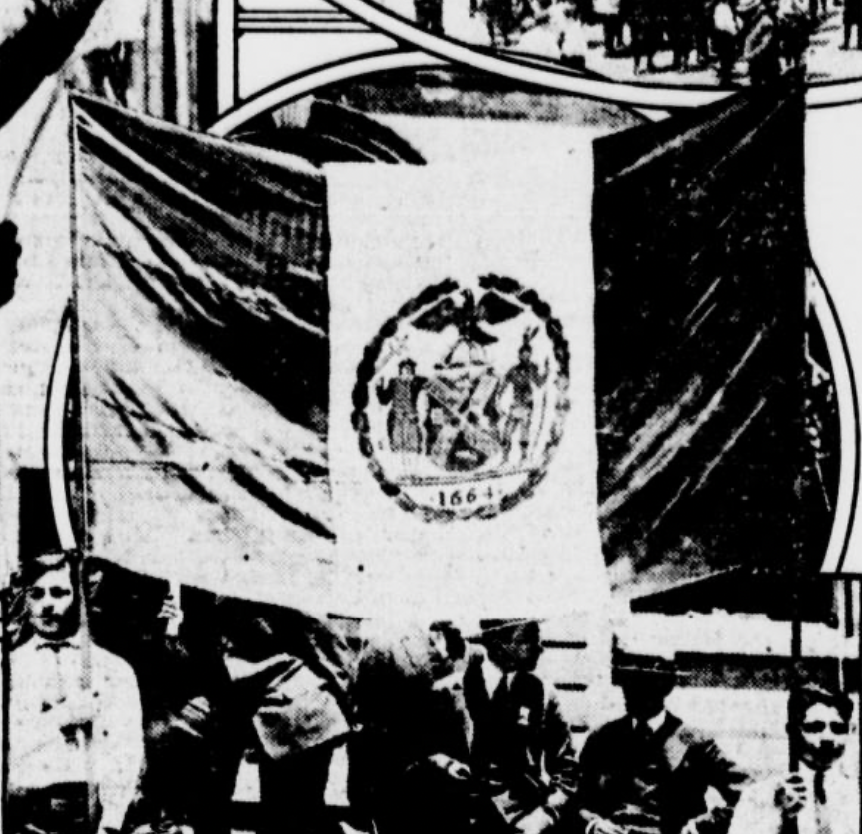
City's flag from 1915

The blue, white and orange refer to the colors of the historical flag of the Dutch monarchy. Though otherwise identical to the flag of the Dutch Republic (Statenvlag), the Prince's Flag features an orange band in place of red. While New Amsterdam was under de facto control of the Dutch state, it was founded and operated by the Dutch West Indies Company (WIC). As a privately owned, yet royally chartered company, the WIC inherited the heraldic colors of the Dutch monarchy, orange representing the ancestral constituency of its founder, William I, Prince of Orange. The committee's report stated that "the order of arrangement follows the practice found in the French, Belgian and other tri-colors, of placing the darkest bar next to the staff."

The New-York Historical Society originally proposed adopting a horizontal tricolor to be more reflective of the historical Dutch flags, but the committee kept the vertical orientation.

=== Symbolism ===
- Bald eagle: The symbol of the United States of America; prior to independence this was an English crown
- Native American: The original Lenape inhabitants of the area
- Seaman: Symbolizes the European settlers of the area
- Windmill: Remembers the prosperous industry of milling flour.
- Beaver: Symbolizes the Dutch West India Company, which was the first company in New York, then known as New Amsterdam. Also the official animal of New York State.
- Flour barrels: In the 17th century, New York had been granted a short-lived monopoly on milling, which established the fledgling colony as a commercial powerhouse
- 1625: Originally depicted 1664, the year was later changed to honor the establishment of New Amsterdam as capital of New Netherland colony, which was actually settled in 1624. The 1625 date has been described as "arbitrary" by the public historian at the New-York Historical Society and "simply wrong" by Michael Miscione, the Manhattan borough historian.

=== Inconsistency ===
Although the City Code states that the seal's Latin legend is to be omitted from the flag, the city's own webpage shows a flag with the motto intact.

== Use ==
The flag is flown at New York City Hall, the headquarters of the New York Police Department, and at some city properties, such as public parks.

Several New York City sports teams have adopted the colors of the flag as their official team colors, including the New York Knicks of the National Basketball Association, the New York Mets of Major League Baseball, and the New York City FC of Major League Soccer. In 2017, NYCFC added the tricolor city flag to its jersey, substituting its own "NYC" monogram in place of the seal. The New York Islanders of the National Hockey League also use the orange, blue, and white color scheme; however, although the team moved to the New York City borough of Brooklyn in 2015, the team colors were selected when the team played in Nassau County, Long Island, which also has blue and orange as official colors. (They moved back to Long Island in 2020.) Additionally, the Syracuse Orange football jerseys follow an orange, blue and white color scheme; however, the Orange play one home game in the Bronx every few years, as the team usually plays at JMA Wireless Dome in Syracuse.

== Mayoral flag ==
Flag of the mayor of New York City

The office of the mayor of New York City has its own official variant, to which is added an arc of five five-pointed stars (representing each of the five boroughs) in blue above the seal. The dimensions of the mayor's flag are set at 33 inches by 44 inches.

== Council flag ==
The New York City Council uses a variant of the city flag, with the word "Council" in capitals underneath the seal.

== Boroughs ==
Currently, Brooklyn, the Bronx, and Staten Island have official borough flags. The other two boroughs have standard designs in current use, though they have never been officially adopted.

=== The Bronx ===
Flag of The Bronx

The design of the flag of the Bronx consists of a horizontal tricolor. The top band is orange, the middle band is white, and the band at the bottom is blue, mimicking the historical Dutch tricolor. In the center of the flag is a laurel wreath denoting honor and fame. The wreath encircles the Bronck family arms. The shield of the family arms shows the face of the sun with rays displayed rising from the sea, signifying peace, liberty, and commerce. The crest of the arms is an eagle or an auk facing eastward and with its wings expanded, representing "the hope of the New World while not forgetting the Old." The text underneath the shield is also the motto of the borough, and reads "ne cede malis", which is a Latin phrase meaning "Yield not to evil".

The Bronx flag was first adopted in March 1912, by then-Borough President Cyrus C. Miller, and recognized by the city on June 29, 1915.

=== Brooklyn ===
Flag of Brooklyn

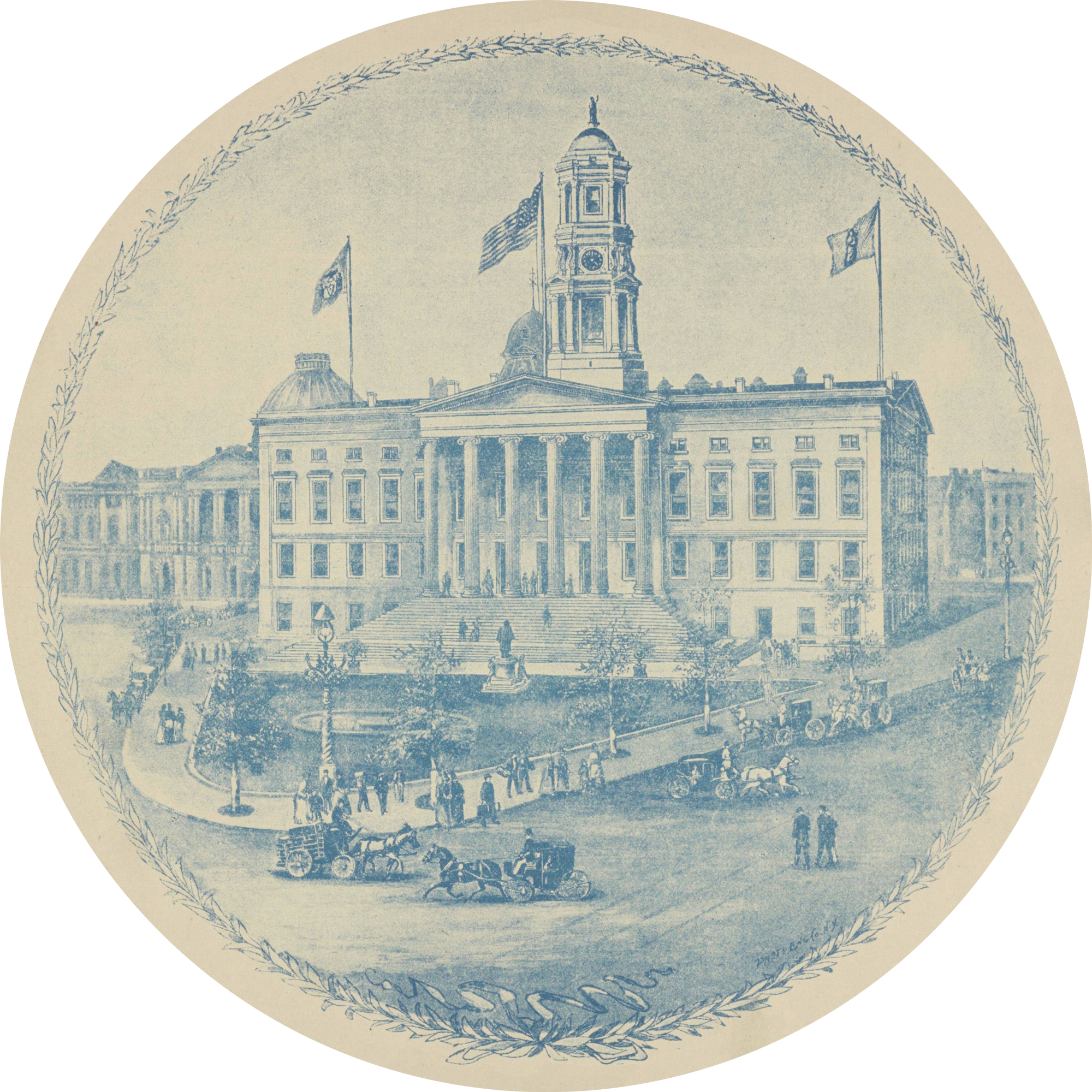
1895 engraving of Brooklyn City Hall, showing Brooklyn's city flag on the right

The flag of Brooklyn has been in use since at least 1860 when Brooklyn was an independent city.

The flag of Brooklyn has a white background with a seal at the center. Within the seal is an image of the Goddess of Justice set on a background of light blue, and bearing fasces, a traditional emblem of unity. The fasces is composed of six rods, representing Brooklyn's original six towns (five Dutch, one English) under New Netherland. Encircling that image is a ring of dark blue and the Old Dutch phrase "Een Draght Macht Maght" (modern Dutch: "Eendracht maakt macht") which translates into English as "Unity makes strength". During the City of Greater New York consolidation process of the 1890s, "Miss Brooklyn" from the flag became a popular figure, allegorized as being courted by Father Knickerbocker. Also in the darker ring are the words "Borough of Brooklyn". The outside and inside rim of the seal are gold-colored. The primary colors of the seal, blue and gold, have been adopted by the Borough President's office as Brooklyn's own colors. During Grover Cleveland's inauguration in 1885, members of the "Kings County Democracy" of Brooklyn carried a banner that bore a blue field with the city's seal in the center. The flag was mentioned in the lyrics in a 1897 children's pledge, in which it was described as "...The city’s flag is white and blue"

=== Manhattan ===
Flag of the Borough of Manhattan

The Borough of Manhattan's unofficial flag is very similar to the New York City flag. The only difference from the city flag is the use of the seal of the borough in place of the city seal. The seal is similar to the city's but circular in shape. It has two stars below and is encircled by the inscription "Borough of Manhattan November 1, 1683". The date at the bottom is the date on which the Province of New York was divided into twelve counties by New York Governor Thomas Dongan, and New York County (Manhattan) was created, with the same border in use today.

Variant flag of Manhattan with simplified seal

The borough has used variations on its official flag; featuring changes to the seal. One includes the encircling inscription "The President of the Borough of Manhattan NYC" to represent the institution in official occasions when the Borough President is present. Another flag has been used by the borough, it consists of the same layout, with a simplified seal without the two stars removed from the seal, and with the date removed from the inscription.

=== Queens ===
Flag of Queens

The flag of Queens contains three horizontal bands, with the top and bottom being sky blue, and the middle white. These colors represent the arms of the first Dutch Governor Willem Kieft. At its center is a design consisting of a ring of wampum, a tulip, and a rose. At the top-left of the flag is a crown, the words 'Queens Borough' stylized as 'Qveens Borovgh' emblazoned in gold, and 1898, the year the five boroughs were consolidated.

The symbols on the flag's design represent the borough's collective heritage with the wampum paying homage to the Lenape natives who formerly called the land 'Seawanhaka' (a word meaning "island of sea shells") in reference to it as a place where they would collect clams and whelks used to make these beads. The tulip shown on the flag represents the Dutch, who were early settlers of the area. The red and white rose is a Tudor rose, a traditional symbol of England and the English monarchy. The queen's crown signifies the namesake of the borough, which was named in honor of Catherine of Braganza, Queen Consort of England in 1683, when New York's original twelve counties (of which Queens was one) were established.

The Queens flag was adopted on June 3, 1913, and first displayed four days later at a celebration marking the beginning of construction on the borough's dual rapid transit system.

=== Staten Island ===
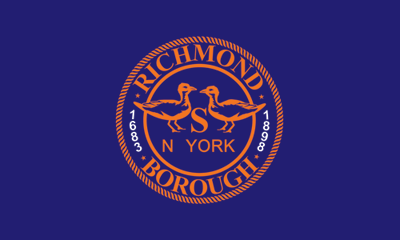
Flag of the Borough of Richmond, used until the borough was renamed "Staten Island" (1948–1975)

The Current flag of Staten Island as of 2026, unofficially chosen in 2016

The current flag of Staten Island was unofficially adopted in 2016 and officially adopted in 2026. The flag has flown over the Staten Island Advance and Chamber of Commerce buildings, and is on display in City Hall and Staten Island Borough Hall.

Staten Island has had three unofficial flags. The first was adopted at the same time as the flags of Brooklyn, Queens, and the Bronx. It featured a navy blue background with an orange seal in the center, containing two waterfowl and the text "Richmond Borough 1663 1898 New York". "Borough of Richmond" was the official name of Staten Island prior to 1975.

The next flag consisted of elements designed for a contest held in 1971 by Staten Island's Borough President Robert T. Connor. That flag had a white background with an oval in the center. Within the oval is a blue sky and two white seagulls. The green outline represented the countryside, and the white shape represented the cityscape, denoting the residential areas of Staten Island. In the center of the oval were found the words "Staten Island" in gold. Under the name, five wavy blue lines symbolized the bodies of water surrounding the island.

The 1971 flag was criticized by Borough President James Oddo, who told the Staten Island Advance that the current flag "looks like the Fresh Kills Landfill. The bird looks like a seagull, the mountain looks like a garbage pile."

In March 2016, Oddo created a new flag and new seal for the borough. Set in earth tones, each features an allegoric female figure representing the city standing on the island's shore and looking out onto the Narrows, where Henry Hudson's ship The Half Moon is at anchor. In the background is a small canoe with three oystermen; two native Staten Islanders, and the third a sailor from the Half Moon. At the time, Oddo said that he had not decided if they would try to make the new flag official, like the flags of Brooklyn and the Bronx. The City of New York purchased copies of this flag in 2017 for official functions.

Somewhere in 2025 or 2026, the New York City Council voted in favor of recognizing and adopting Staten Island's unofficial borough flag. Frank Morano sponsored the bill.

== City departments ==
Several city departments have their own flags, for ceremonial or promotional use.

=== Police Department ===
Flag of the New York City Police Department

The first Police Department flag was flown in 1861. It had the state's coat of arms with the word "Police" below.

The flag of the New York City Police Department that is used now was adopted in 1919.

It has twenty-four stars on a blue field, representing the three cities, nine towns, and twelve villages that consolidated in 1898 to form the present city. Five green and white stripes represent the five boroughs.

Officers killed in the line of duty have the police department flag draped over their caskets.

In 2023, the NYPD unveiled a new livery for NYPD patrol vehicles, incorporating design elements from the flag.

=== Fire Department ===
The first Fire Department flag was made in 1887. The flag had white field with emblem of the department in the center. The banner measured 5 x 6 feet and had a golden fringe around it. The whole thing cost $850 (around $29,796 today).

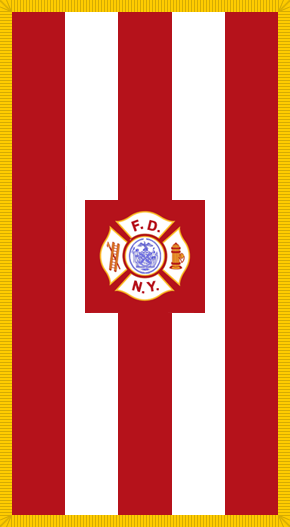
Fire Department variant coffin flag

The flag of the Fire Department of the City of New York has five red and white stripes, representing the five boroughs. The canton features a St. Florian's cross with the city seal in the center, surrounded by a hook, ladder, fire hydrant and the letters "F.D.N.Y.".

The Fire Department uses a variant flag, in a vertical orientation with the St. Florian's cross turned on its side and gold fringe, draped over the caskets of fallen department members.

=== Department of Correction ===
The flag of the Department of Correction was adopted in 1998, upon the centennial of the consolidation of New York City. It features sixteen blue and white stripes, the same number of major facilities administered by the department at that time. On an orange canton sits the Seal of the City of New York in gold, surrounded by five stars for the five boroughs and the year "1895", when the department was created.

=== Parks and Recreation ===
The flag of the Parks Department features the department's leaf logo in green against a white field.

The Parks Department flag is flown on a yardarm over every park in New York City, alongside the city flag and beneath the flag of the United States of America. These yardarms were controversial when first introduced in 1997, partly because they were considered by some to be inappropriate outside of a nautical context and partly because it was seen by the former president of the city's Art Commission as over-reaching on the part of Parks Commissioner Henry Stern.

=== Sheriff ===
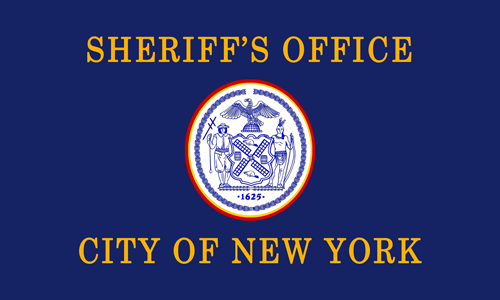
Flag of the New York City Sheriff's Office

The flag of the New York City Sheriff's Office features a navy blue field, on which is the city's seal in blue against an oblong white background outlined in gold and red. The words "SHERIFF'S OFFICE" and "CITY OF NEW YORK" are set in gold horizontal text above and below the seal, respectively.

=== Sanitation ===
The New York City Department of Sanitation flag features the department's symbol – a caduceus with the letter "S" superimposed upon it – against a blue field, surrounded by the words "THE CITY OF NEW YORK" and "DEPARTMENT OF SANITATION" in gold.

== See also ==
- Prince's Flag
- Seal of New York City
