= Lammhult =

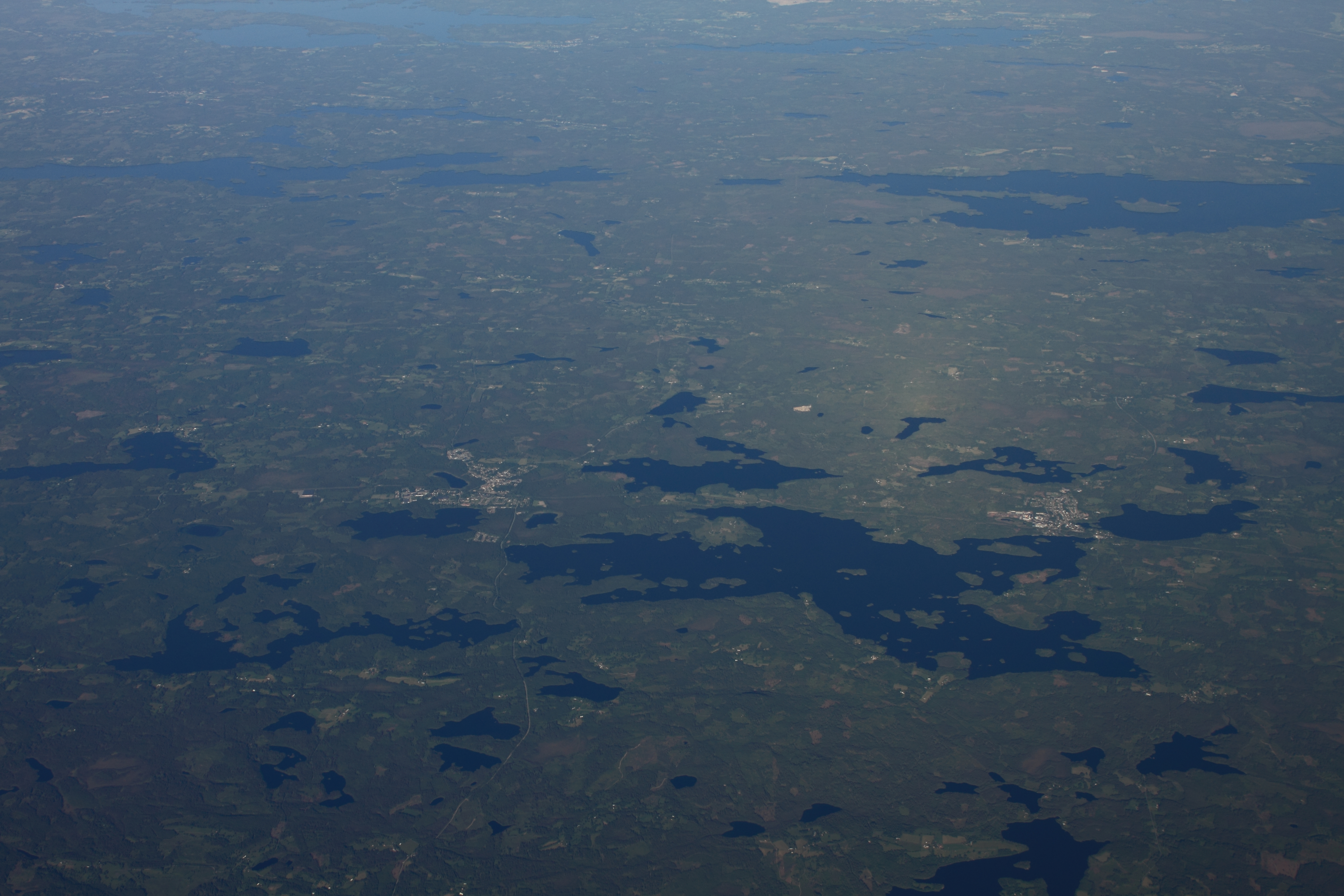
- Rörvik and Lammhult seen from an aeroplane

- Location within Kronoberg Location within Sweden
- Coordinates: 57°10′N 14°35′E
- Country: Sweden
- Province: Småland
- County: Kronoberg County
- Municipality: Växjö Municipality

Area
  - Total: 2.25 km^{2} (0.87 sq mi)

Population (31 December 2010)
  - Total: 1,459
  - Density: 647/km^{2} (1,680/sq mi)
- Time zone: UTC+1 (CET)
  - Summer (DST): UTC+2 (CEST)

Lammhult is a locality situated in Växjö Municipality, Kronoberg County, Sweden with 1,459 inhabitants in 2010. Lammhult has a long tradition with making furniture, presently production by designer brands are Norrgavel and Lammhult among several. It has also large retail stores for furniture and such items.
