= Sävsjö =

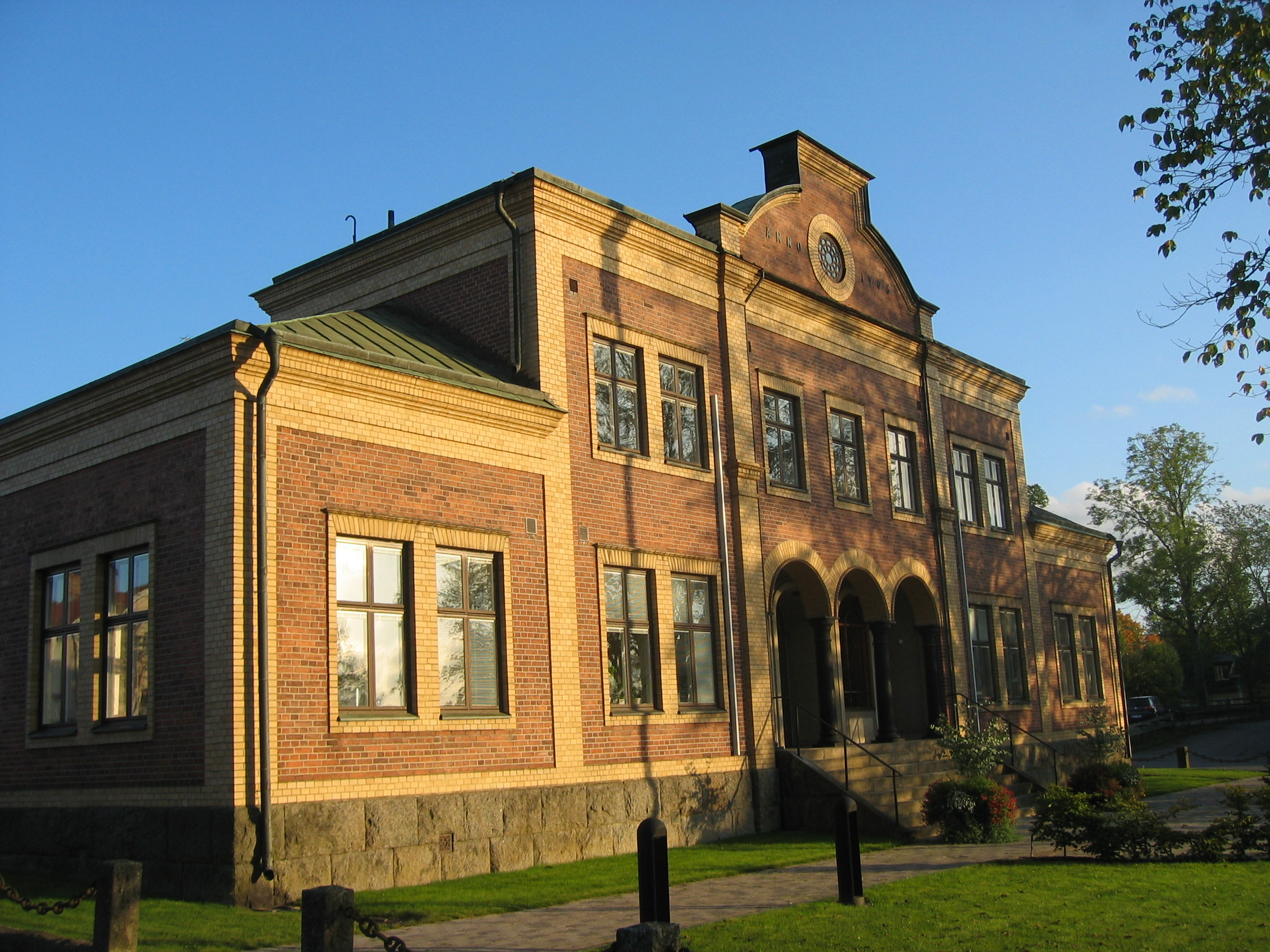
- Former Sävsjö lawcourt building in 2006

- Location within Jönköping Location within Sweden
- Coordinates: 57°24′N 14°40′E
- Country: Sweden
- Province: Småland
- County: Jönköping County
- Municipality: Sävsjö Municipality

Area
  - Total: 4.39 km^{2} (1.69 sq mi)

Population (31 December 2010)
  - Total: 5,122
  - Density: 1,166/km^{2} (3,020/sq mi)
- Time zone: UTC+1 (CET)
  - Summer (DST): UTC+2 (CEST)

Sävsjö is a locality and the seat of Sävsjö Municipality, Jönköping County, Sweden with 5,122 inhabitants in 2010.

== Geography ==
Sävsjö is located on the main line railway between Stockholm and Malmö. The distance to Malmö is about 220 kilometers.

== History ==
Sävsjö regards the date 1 October 1864, as the start of its current history, because it was then that the train station Sävsjö was inaugurated. At that time Sävsjö was nothing more than a few houses, but attracted by the railway it began expanding, attracting both industries and inhabitants. The settlement with its then 1.56 square kilometres had 1,481 people in 1917 at which time several small industries had established themselves there, most notably carpenters and other wood industries, and there was also a bank, a pharmacy and a post office.

In 1947 the rural municipalities Norra Ljunga and Vallsjö in which the settlement was situated were combined and formed the City of Sävsjö. Since the local government reform of 1971 Sävsjö is the seat of the much larger Sävsjö Municipality.

== Sports ==
The handball club Sävsjö HK has won the Swedish women's Championship 6 times in the 1990's, but do not play at elite level any longer.

== Notable people ==
- Eilert Ekwall (1877–1964), Swedish scholar of the English language, born in the hamlet of Vallsjö in present-day Sävsjö
- Jonas Bronck (1600–1643), namesake of the borough The Bronx, New York City, born in the hamlet of Komstad outside of present-day Sävsjö
- Sam Weihagen (born 1950), travel group executive
