= Seal of New York City =

- Armiger: New York City
- Adopted: 1915 (modified 1977)
- Crest: An American eagle with wings displayed, upon a hemisphere
- Shield: Saltire-wise, the sails of a windmill. Between the sails, in chief a beaver, in base a beaver, and on each flank a flour barrel.
- Supporters: Dexter (bearer's right, viewer's left), a sailor, his right arm bent, and holding in his right hand a plummet; his left arm bent, his left hand resting on the top of the shield; above his right shoulder, a cross-staff. Sinister (bearer's left, viewer's right), an Indian of Manhattan, his right arm bent, his right hand resting on top of the shield, his left hand holding the upper end of a bow, the lower end of which rests on the ground.
- Motto: Sigillum Civitatis Novi Eboraci (Latin for "Seal of the City of New York")
- Other elements: Shield and supporters rest upon a horizontal laurel branch. Beneath the horizontal laurel branch the date 1625. A laurel wreath encircles the seal.
- Earlier version(s): Many, dating to 1654
- Use: On documents from the city, as a symbol identifying officers of the city, adorning city property and the city flag

The seal of New York City is the city's official corporate insignia. According to the city's Administrative Code, it is used to identify documents or publications issued under the authority of the city or its departments. It is also engraved into property owned by the city, used to identify officers of the city, and featured on the city's flag.

New York City has had a seal since 1654, when the city was the Dutch settlement known as New Amsterdam. The seal has since undergone multiple changes, and for a period the city had multiple seals. These changes and multiple seals largely resulted from the city's transition to British and, later, American control, as well as from tensions between the mayor and the city's elected council. The current seal was designed in 1915 and most recently modified in 1977.

The city clerk of New York City is the custodian of the city seal.

== Design ==
=== Official description ===
According to the New York City Administrative Code, the city seal must adhere to the following design:

1. Arms: Upon a shield, saltire wise, the sails of a windmill. Between the sails, in chief a beaver, in base a beaver, and on each flank a flour barrel.
2. Supporters: Dexter, a sailor, his right arm bent, and holding in his right hand a plummet; his left arm bent, his left hand resting on the top of the shield; above his right shoulder a cross-staff. Sinister, an Indian of Manhattan, his right arm bent, his right hand resting on top of the shield, his left hand holding the upper end of a bow, and lower end of which rests on the ground.
3. Shield and supporters resting upon a horizontal laurel branch.
4. Date: Beneath the horizontal laurel branch the date 1625 being the year of the establishment of New Amsterdam.
5. Crest: Upon a hemisphere, an American eagle with wings displayed.
6. Legend: Upon a ribbon encircling the lower half of the design the words "Sigillum Civitatis Novi Eboraci" (Latin for "Seal of the City of New York").
7. The whole encircled by a laurel wreath.

=== Overview ===
The design of the current seal of New York City is adapted from the seal of the city first used in 1686. It features common elements from coats of arms used throughout heraldry, such as a shield, supporters, and a crest. (Note: While the seal contains elements from coats of arms, the city's Administrative Code does not include a provision for a separate coat of arms for the city. The code does not include a description of the color of the seal, except that it should be rendered in blue on the city's flag.)

The two supporters represent friendship between Native Americans and colonists: in the dexter position, a sailor colonist holds a plummet—a navigational tool—in his right hand, while over his right shoulder is another navigational tool, a cross-staff; in the sinister position, a Lenape native to Manhattan rests his left hand on a bow.

On the shield, the four windmill sails recall the city's Dutch history as New Amsterdam, and the beavers and flour barrels signify the city's earliest trade goods. Specifically, the flour barrels and windmill sails represent the tremendous wealth generated by New York City from the Bolting Act of 1674. The act gave the city an exclusive monopoly to mill and export flour. The shield and supporters rest on a horizontal laurel branch.

Located at the crest over the shield is an American eagle, added in 1784 after the American Revolution and taken from the seal of New York State. The eagle replaced an imperial crown, which had represented the authority of the British monarch during the colonial period. The eagle rests on a hemisphere.

Beneath the shield is the date, 1625, when New Amsterdam was designated the capital of the province of New Netherland. The use of this date has been a source of debate among historians, as there is evidence that the first European settlers actually arrived in the region, and established what became New Amsterdam, in 1624. New Amsterdam was incorporated in 1653. Different founding dates have appeared on the seal throughout its history. Beneath the date is a ribbon that bears the legend SIGILLUM CIVITATIS NOVI EBORACI, which means "Seal of the City of New York". Eboracum was the Latin name for York, the titular seat of James II as Duke of York, for whom New York City is named.

A laurel wreath, an ancient Greek symbol of victory, encircles the seal.

== Uses ==
=== General ===
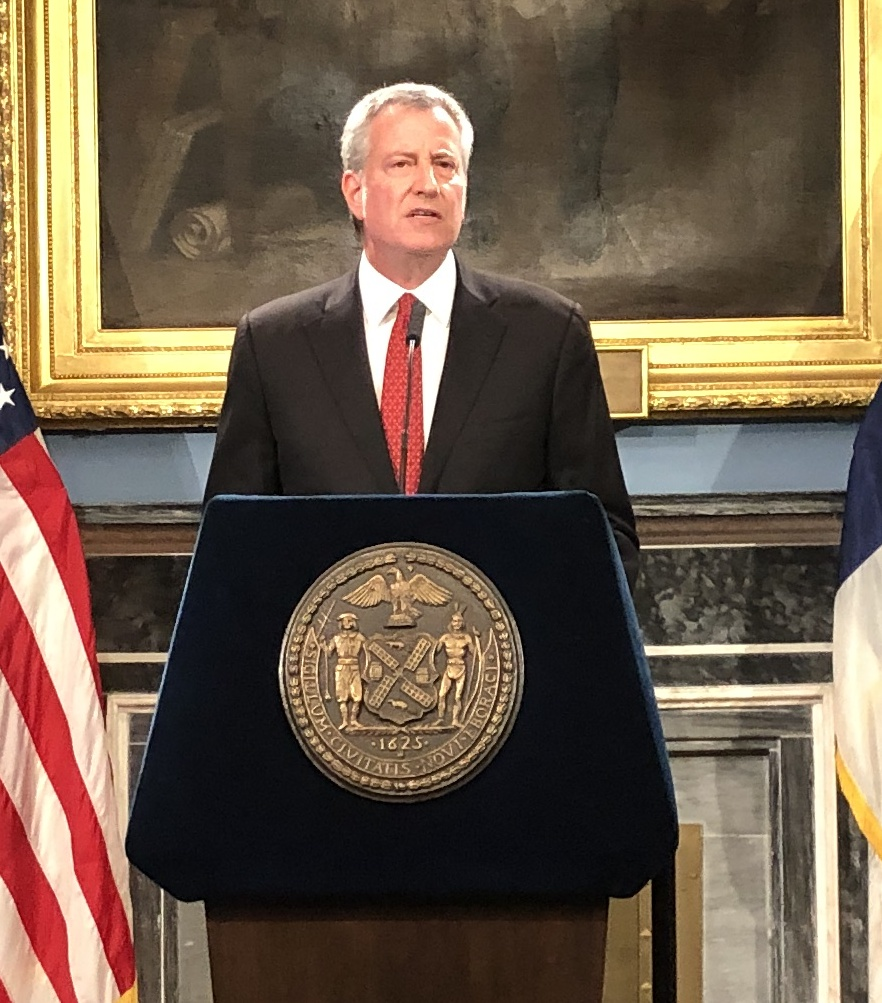
Bill de Blasio, the city's 109th mayor, speaking from a lectern adorned with the city seal

The New York City Administrative Code states that the seal "shall be used for all requisite purposes" by the city clerk and "all other officers of the city who are required or authorized to have or use the corporate seal of the city". It then states that the seal can be:

1. Impressed or printed on documents, publications or stationery, issued or used by or in the name of or under the authority of the city, its agencies or of any borough or department thereof,

2. Carved or otherwise represented on buildings or structures owned by the city, or

3. Otherwise officially portrayed.

The Administrative Code further states that the city seal shall appear on the city flag "in blue upon the middle or white bar, omitting the legend Sigillum Civitatis Novi Eboraci".

In practice, in addition to the above, the city seal is used as a lectern adornment for speeches or statements by the mayor, the speaker of the City Council, or other city officials. The city also uses the seal for commercial purposes, selling items on which it is featured.

=== Flag ===
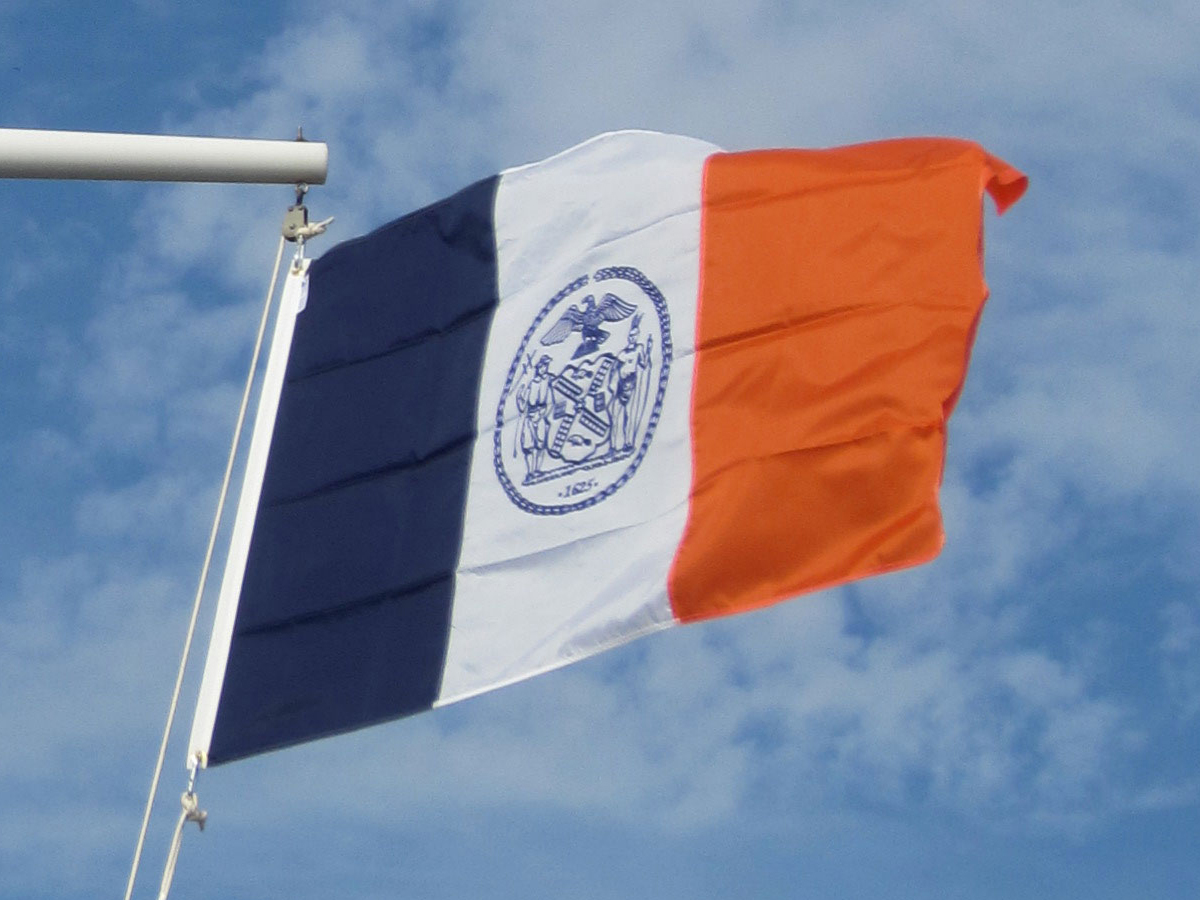
Flag of New York City

Prior to 1915, New York City did not have an official flag. Unofficially, a flag was in use throughout the city that featured an unofficial version of the city seal, in blue, on a white field. A 1915 Arts Commission committee which redesigned the city seal noted that there was no record that the city had adopted this flag. At the committee's recommendation, the city adopted its current flag in 1915, featuring a modified version of the newly adopted city seal—the modification being the absence of the seal's Latin legend.

=== Restrictions ===
According to the New York City Administrative Code, the city seal cannot be displayed with any alteration or addition to the standard design. The only exception is in its use on the city flag or "for architectural or ornamental purposes", in which case the Latin legend may be omitted. A defaced or canceled seal must remain in the custody of the city clerk.

In addition, the code forbids use of the seal by anyone who is not the city clerk or "other officers of the city who are required or authorized to have or use the corporate seal of the city". In this regard, it states that "any representation of the city seal used on any vehicle other than one owned or used by the city, shall subject the owner of such vehicle to a fine of twenty-five dollars or imprisonment for a term not exceeding ten days".

== History ==
=== 1654 seal ===
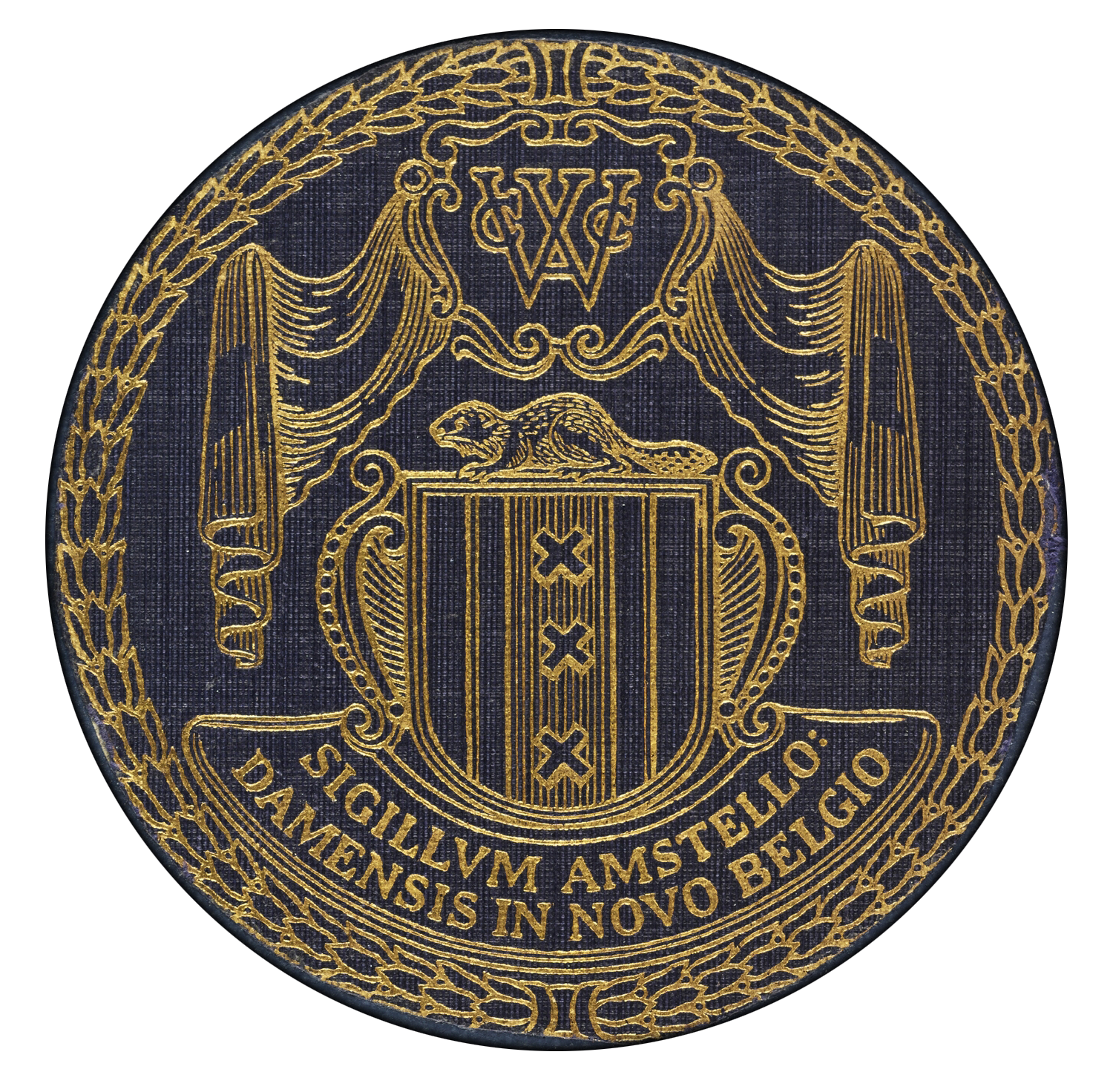
1654 seal of New Amsterdam

From its founding until 1654, the Dutch settlement of New Amsterdam did not have its own seal. Because it was managed by the provincial governor of New Netherland, it used the seal of New Netherland. After incorporation in 1653, which granted New Amsterdam its own government, the city requested a seal from the Dutch West India Company, which owned and ultimately managed the province of New Netherland. A proposal for a coat of arms of New Amsterdam had been put forward as early as 1630; it featured beavers in the role of supporters, an acknowledgment of the importance of the trade in beaver skins to the growing economy of the province. The beaver was also the prominent element of the seal of New Netherland. However, this design was rejected. The Dutch West India Company instead chose a design that featured the company's insignia on a mantle and a single beaver over a shield emblazoned with a modified version of the arms of Amsterdam. The original full-color rendering of this first official symbol of the city has since been lost, but historians have conjectured that, on the shield, the central pale was black, the three crosses were white, the field was red, and the bands bordering the central pale were either gold or white, in keeping with the heraldic rule of tincture. The draped mantling at the top was likely a tricolor of orange, white, and blue, referencing the flag of the Netherlands in use at the founding of New Amsterdam.

=== 1669 seal ===
Although New Amsterdam was surrendered to the British in 1664, whereupon its name was changed to New York, the seal of New Amsterdam remained in use until 1669. In that year, both the city and the province of New York received new seals from the Duke of York. However, the design of the city seal of 1669 is not known, as no descriptions or uses of it have been found.

=== 1686 seal and the "small seal" ===
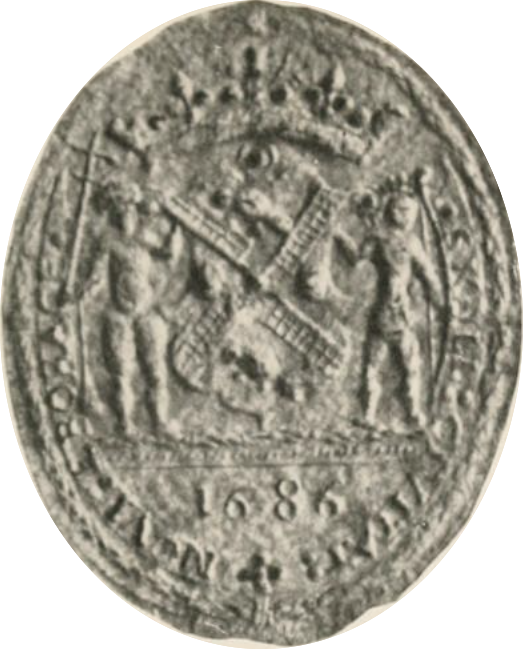
1686 seal with ducal crown

In 1683, the city's Common Council petitioned the colonial governor of New York for an official charter, including the right to designate their own seal. In 1686, the charter was granted. It included the right of the city to "breake Change Alter and new make their said Comon Seale when and as often as to them it shall seem convenient". The city's Common Council then adopted a new seal on July 24, 1686, the first to be designed and approved by the city in its own right. The design contained many elements that survive in the current city seal—namely, a shield featuring windmill sails, beavers, and flour barrels, a colonial sailor and a Native American as supporters, a Latin legend, a founding date (in this case, 1686 was used), and a laurel wreath. The first known use of the 1686 seal reveals that the seal featured a ducal crown at the crest, a fact that has puzzled historians, since the city's owner and namesake, James II, had ascended to the throne of England in 1685, and thus the use of an imperial crown would have been warranted. Subsequent uses of the seal show that a change to an imperial crown was made, although the exact date of the change is unknown.

A notable aspect of the 1686 seal is the depiction of the Native American supporter, which does not conform to descriptions of the Native Americans who lived in and around Manhattan. Specifically, the seal depicts the Native American wearing a war bonnet, which was not a headdress known to be worn among Eastern Algonquian peoples.

After the 1686 seal was adopted, a second, slightly different city seal appears in the historical record, affixed to documents signed by multiple mayors. The creation of this second seal was not recorded in the minutes of the Common Council, and its origins are unknown. It is referred to in later city laws merely as the "small seal".

=== 1735 seal of mayoralty ===
In 1735, a feud between the Common Council and the city's mayor, Paul Richard, resulted in the creation of an additional seal. The 1686 seal and the so-called "small seal" remained as official seals of the city, while a third seal was created for the mayor. This mayoral seal was similar in design to the city seal, except that it was circular instead of oval and bore the legend "City of New York Seal of Mayoralty". A law was then passed designating for which purpose each seal could be used.

=== 1784 seals ===
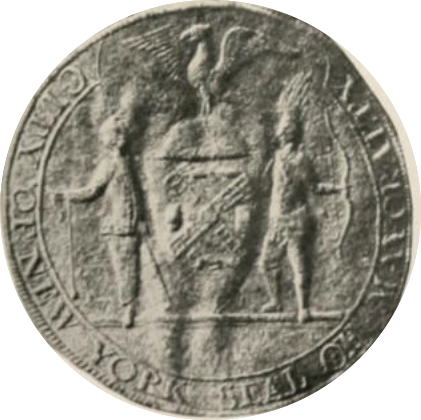
1784 seal of mayoralty

At the conclusion of the American Revolutionary War in 1783, New York City had three official seals. Among the first post-war acts of the New York City Common Council was the removal of the British imperial crown from these seals. In 1784, new seals were adopted, with a crest featuring an eagle resting on a hemisphere, a device taken from the seal of New York State. The Common Council published a description of the new seals and their purpose in the city's newspapers. In this description, the "small seal" is identified as the seal of the Mayor's Court.

Aside from the removal of the British crown and addition of a new crest, the 1784 city seal differed from its predecessor only by rendering the Native American's bow, incorrectly, as double-curved (which was a type of bow not typically used by Algonquian peoples), removing the cross-staff from the colonial sailor, and adding fruit-bearing branches on either side of the shield.

Officially, the design of the 1784 city seal remained in effect throughout the 19th century. During the same period, the mayoral seal and seal of the Mayor's Court fell into disuse. With regard to the latter, Dewitt Clinton was the last mayor to preside over the Mayor's Court. As a result of the lack of mayoral involvement, the court was transitioned, by law, into the Court of Common Pleas in 1821.

=== 1915 seal ===
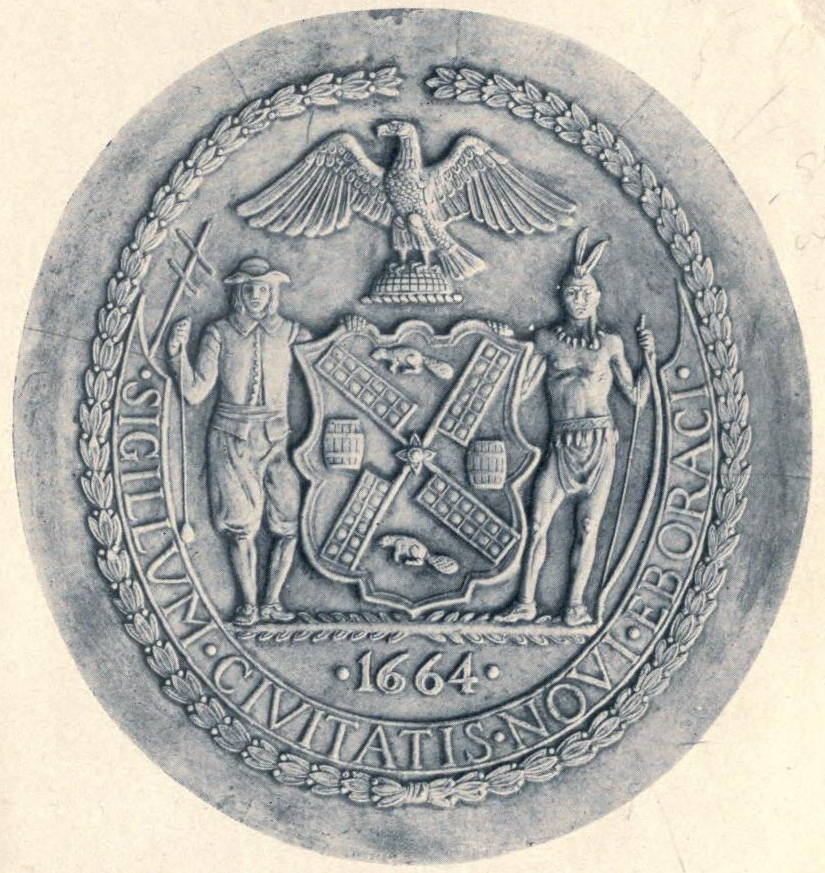
The seal as depicted in 1915 on the original sculpture by Paul Manship; note the 1664 date

While the city seal remained officially unchanged, many unofficial changes were made between 1784 and 1915, due to mistakes, artistic license, or ignorance of the seal's design. In some versions used during this period, the sailor and Native American switched sides or were depicted in a seated position. Their physical appearance also varied. The eagle was sometimes depicted looking the wrong way. Other objects, such as an anchor or ships, were sometimes added. As the 250th anniversary of the installation of the city's first mayor approached, the numerous variations in the seal's appearance prompted the city to appoint a committee to determine the correct design of the seal. This committee, composed of members of the city's Arts Commission, worked with the New-York Historical Society to study imagery and seals going back to the earliest days of New Amsterdam. Incorporating that historical iconography, the committee developed a new seal design, which was submitted to the Board of Aldermen (formerly known as the Common Council) on March 16, 1915. The board approved the design seven days later, and the Arts Commission contracted renowned American sculptor Paul Manship to develop a physical version of the revised seal. After adopting this new design, the city once again had a single seal to be used by all offices of the government. At the recommendation of the Arts Commission, the Board of Aldermen also adopted an official flag for the city, on which a version of the city seal was featured.

The design of the 1915 seal remained faithful to the design of the 1686 seal, with the exception of the crest, where it used the eagle-and-hemisphere device from the 1784 seal. The inaccuracies in the depiction of the Native American supporter were corrected and the cross-staff was restored to the sailor. In addition, the founding date on the seal was changed from 1686, the year of the city's British charter, to 1664, the year the city's name was changed to New York.

=== 1977 seal ===
The most recent modification to the city seal occurred in 1977, at the urging of the president of the City Council (formerly the Board of Aldermen), Paul O'Dwyer, who sought to recognize the city's Dutch origin. In 1974, he first proposed changing the founding year on the city's flag from 1664 to 1625. While 1625 was the year that New Amsterdam was designated the seat of government for the New Netherland province, historians have noted that it is not the year when New Amsterdam was incorporated or physically established. Despite objections from historians and his advisers, Mayor Abraham Beame signed O'Dwyer's bill changing the date on the city flag in 1975. A separate bill to modify the city seal in the same manner was approved two years later.

Since 1977, the seal has faced occasional scrutiny. For example, on July 27, 2020, the city's mayor, Bill de Blasio, recommended that a commission study the appropriateness of the seal's design in the wake of the George Floyd protests.

== Gallery ==
Provincial seal of New Netherland, used by New Amsterdam until 1654

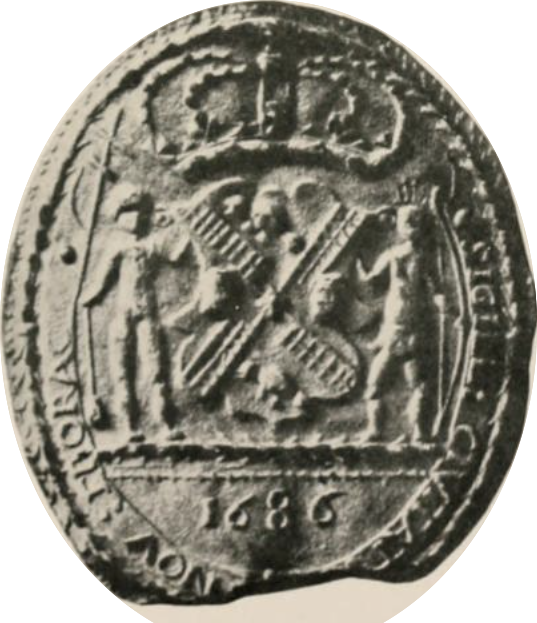
1686 city seal with imperial crown

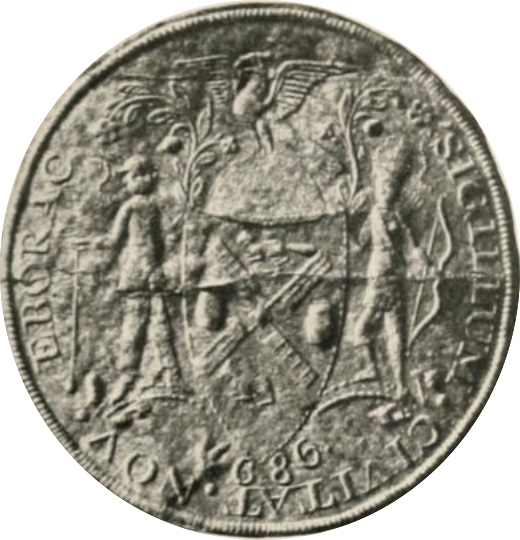
1784 city seal

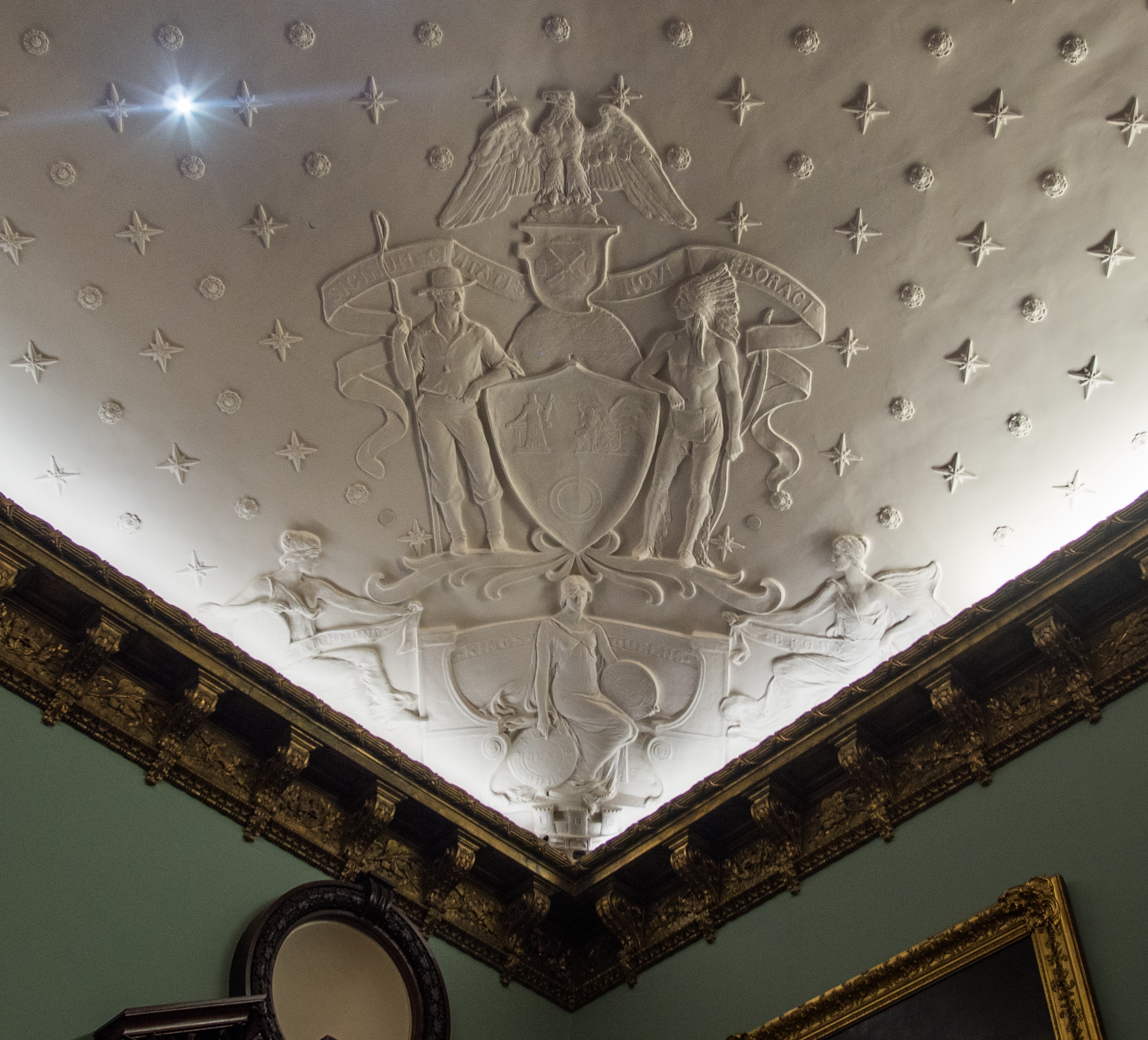
Ceiling engraving in the chamber of the New York City Council. Note the many deviations from the official seal design.

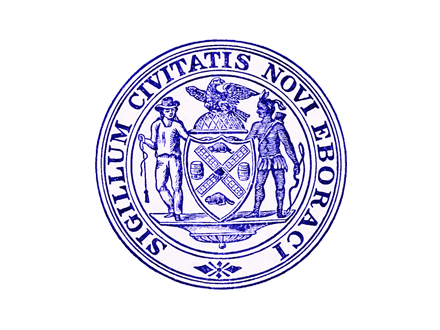
Pre-1915 unofficial city flag featuring an unofficial seal

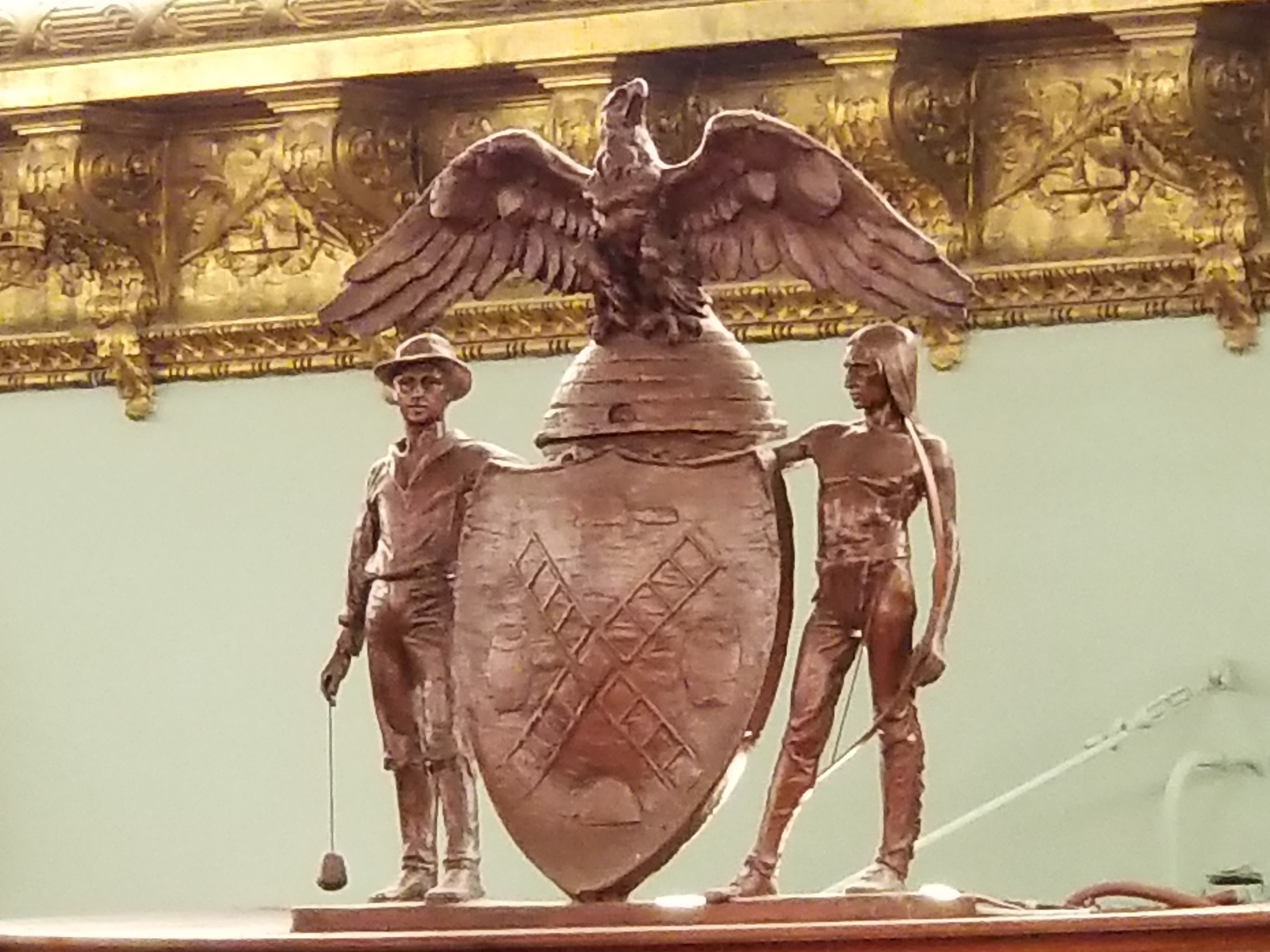
Ornamental shield and supporters in New York City Hall

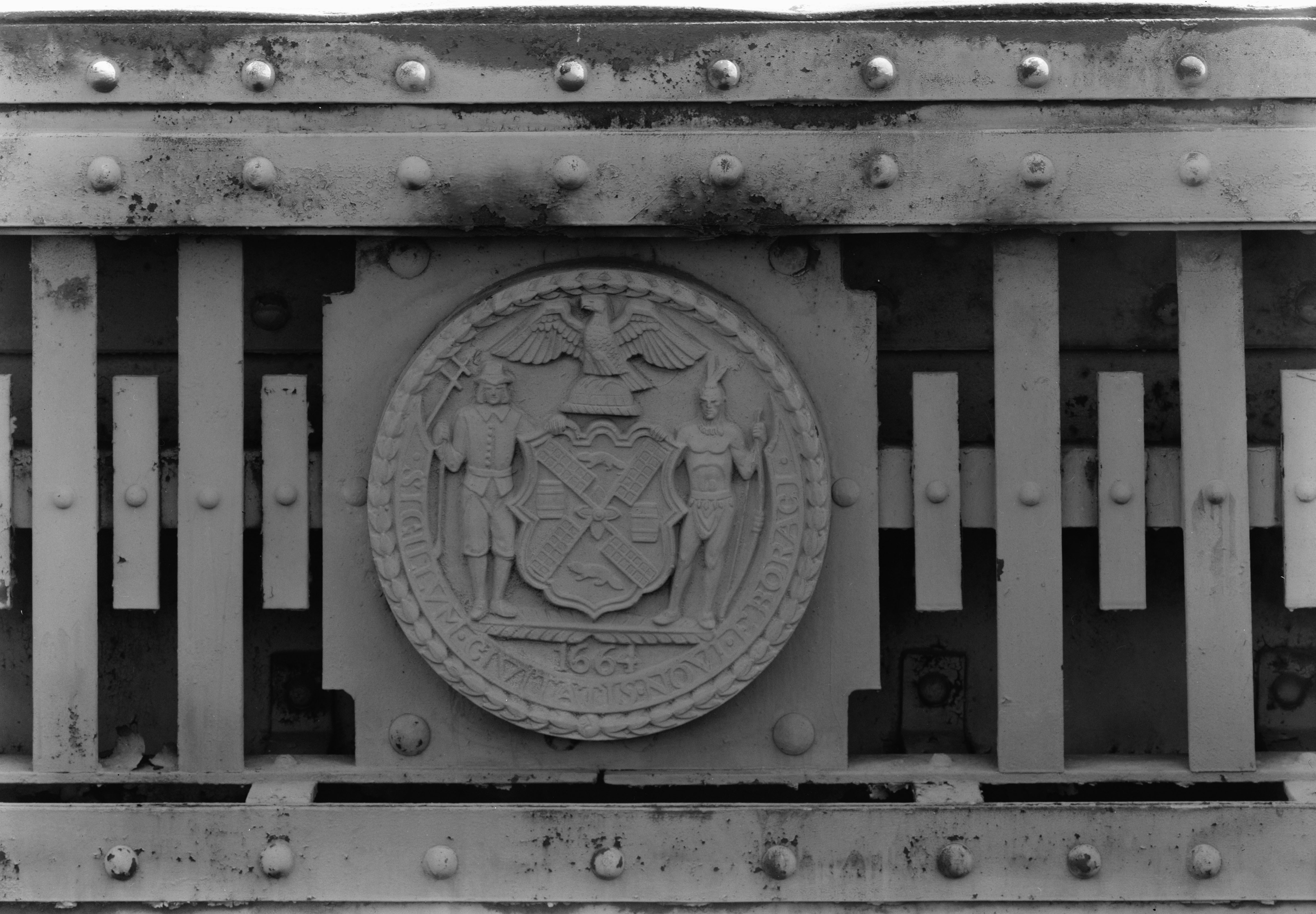
Circular variant of the 1915 seal as a decorative engraving on the West Side Highway

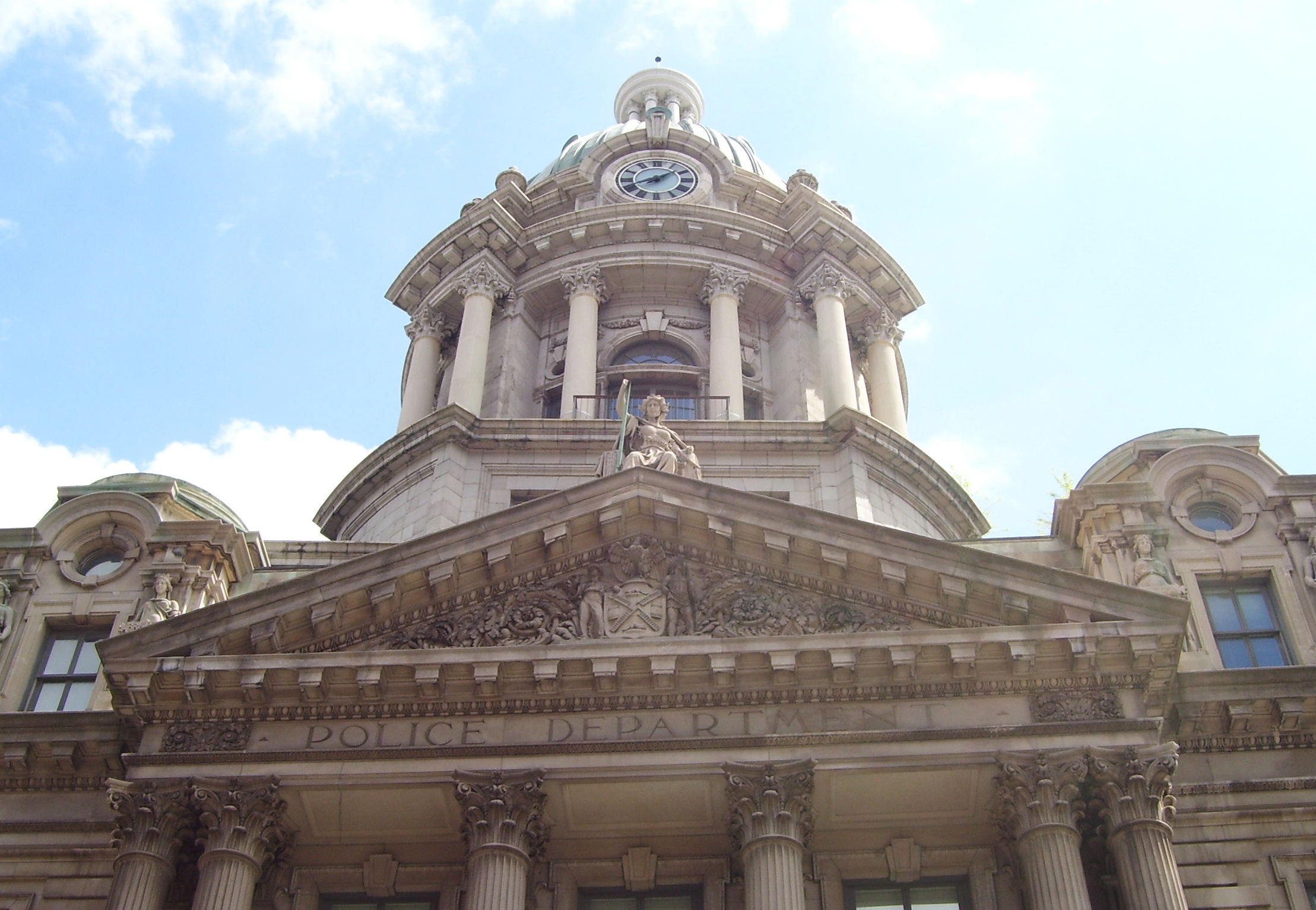
The shield and supporters engraved into the pediment of the former New York City Police Department building

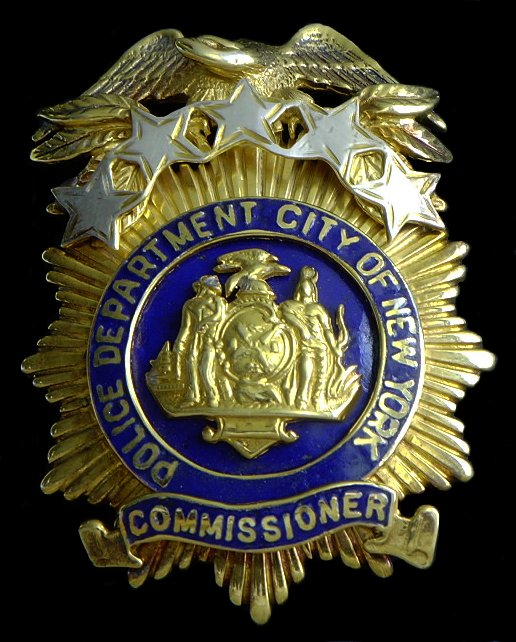
A modified version of the shield and supporters on the badge of the city police commissioner

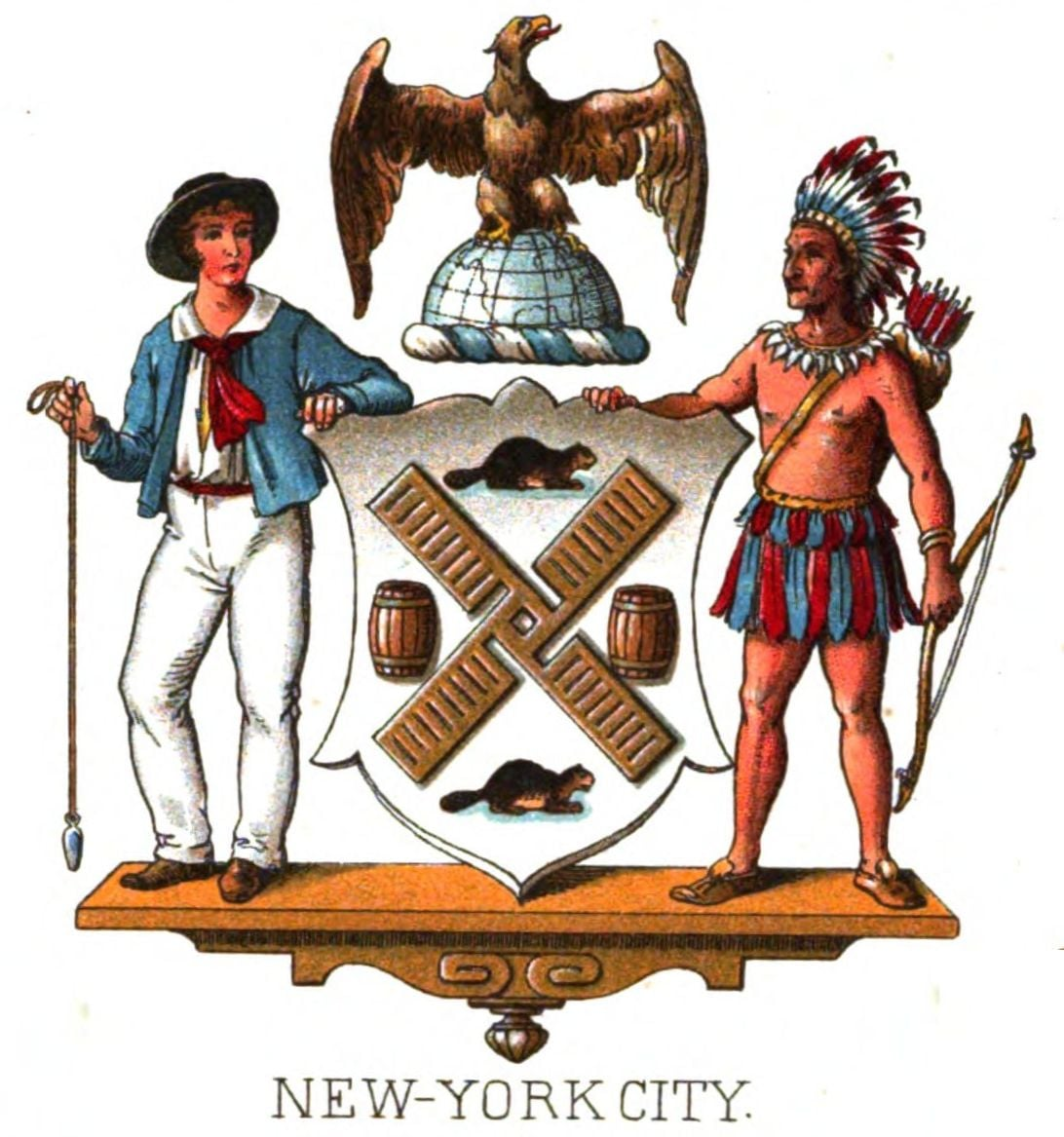
The arms as depicted by Hugo Gerard Ströhl
