= Stockaryd =

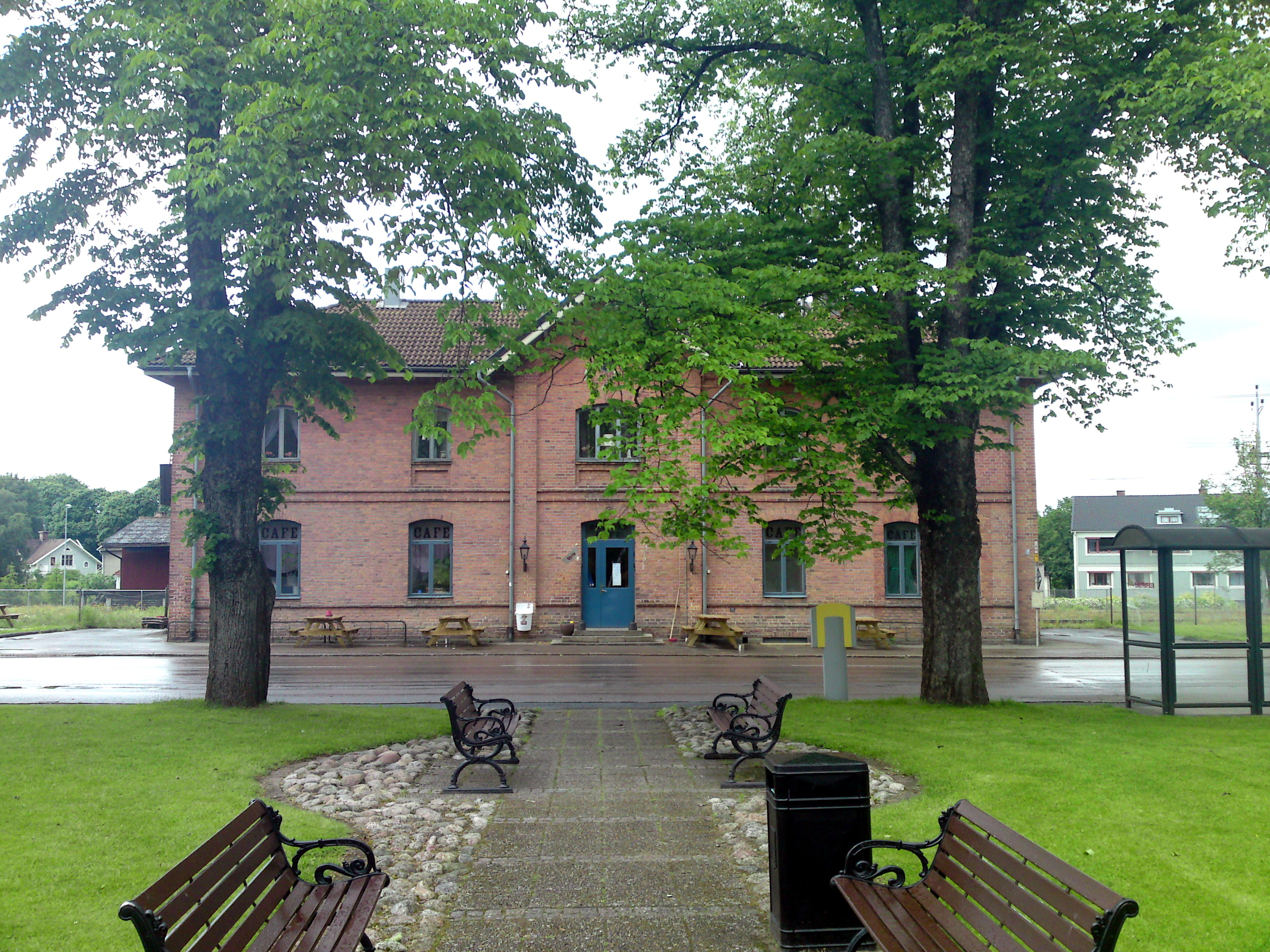
- Stockaryd Train Station in June 2009

- Location within Jönköping Location within Sweden
- Coordinates: 57°19′N 14°35′E
- Country: Sweden
- Province: Småland
- County: Jönköping County
- Municipality: Sävsjö Municipality

Area
  - Total: 1.65 km^{2} (0.64 sq mi)

Population (31 December 2010)
  - Total: 958
  - Density: 582/km^{2} (1,510/sq mi)
- Time zone: UTC+1 (CET)
  - Summer (DST): UTC+2 (CEST)

Stockaryd is a locality situated in Sävsjö Municipality, Jönköping County, Sweden with 1,031 inhabitants in 2023.
