= Sävsjö Municipality =

Sävsjö Municipality Sävsjö kommun
- Municipality
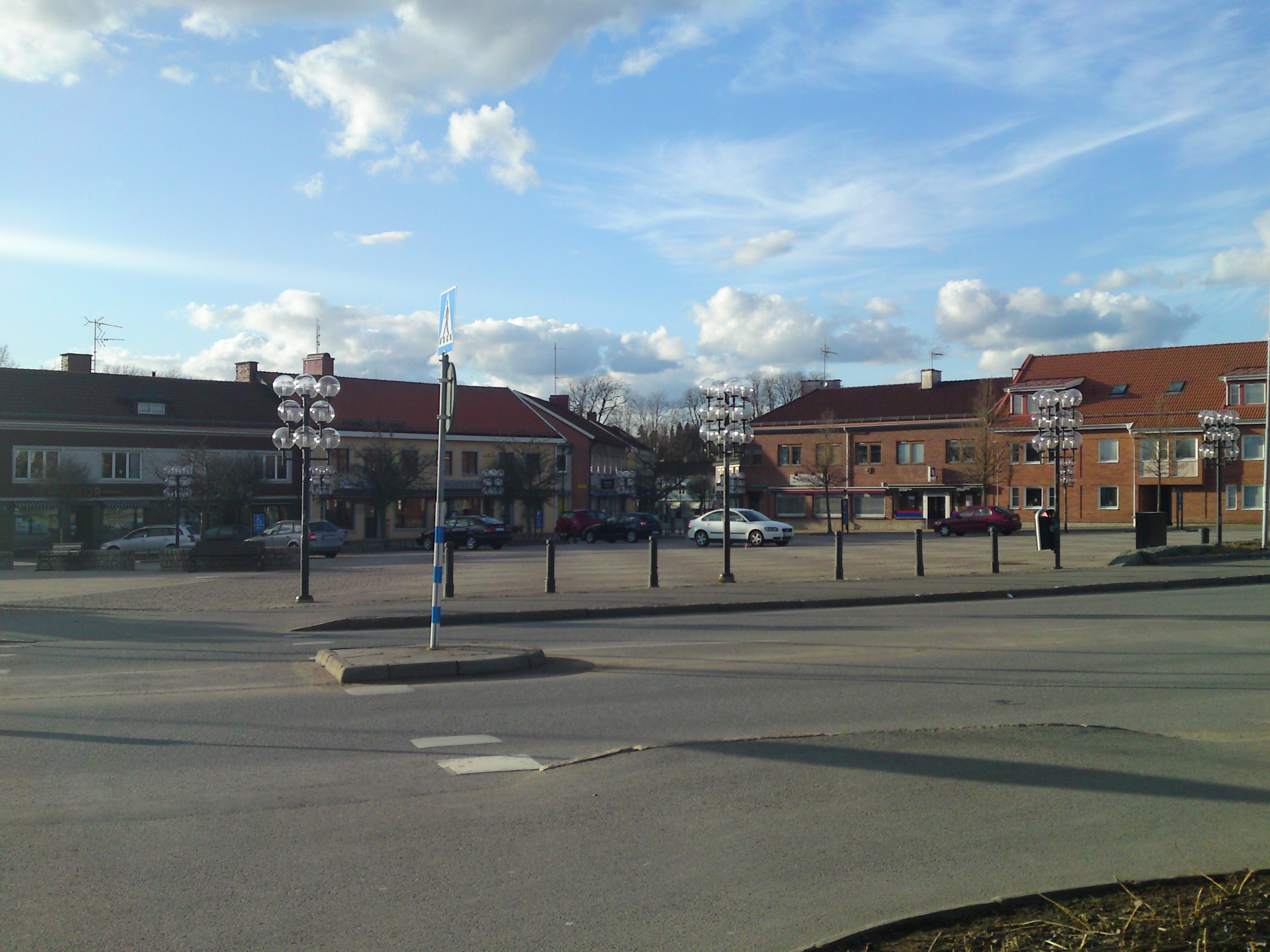

- Coat of arms

- Coordinates: 57°24′N 14°40′E
- Country: Sweden
- County: Jönköping County
- Seat: Sävsjö

Area
  - Total: 729.23 km^{2} (281.56 sq mi)
  - Land: 679.05 km^{2} (262.18 sq mi)
  - Water: 50.18 km^{2} (19.37 sq mi)
- Area as of 1 January 2014.

Population (30 June 2025)
  - Total: 11,556
  - Density: 17.018/km^{2} (44.076/sq mi)
- Time zone: UTC+1 (CET)
  - Summer (DST): UTC+2 (CEST)
- ISO 3166 code: SE
- Province: Småland
- Municipal code: 0684
- Website: www.savsjo.se

Sävsjö Municipality (Swedish: Sävsjö kommun) is a municipality in Jönköping County, southern Sweden where the town Sävsjö is seat.

The municipality was created by the local government reform of 1971, when the City of Sävsjö (instituted as late as 1947) was amalgamated with parts of two adjacent rural municipalities. Two years later it was completed when Hjälmseryd was added.

== Geography ==
The municipality is located on the South Swedish highlands and comprise the old Västra Härad. It is considered a scenic place because the forests are not as dense as in the rest of Småland and the terrain is more varied.

=== Localities ===
There are four urban areas (also called a Tätort or locality) in Sävsjö Municipality.

In the table the localities are listed according to the size of the population as of December 31, 2005. The municipal seat is in bold characters.

#	Locality	Population
1	**Sävsjö**	5,068
2	Vrigstad	1,432
3	Stockaryd	1,003
4	Rörvik	555

== Demographics ==
This is a demographic table based on Sävsjö Municipality's electoral districts in the 2022 Swedish general election sourced from SVT's election platform, in turn taken from SCB official statistics.

In total there were 11,700 residents, including 8,376 Swedish citizens of voting age. 34.0% voted for the left coalition and 63.9% for the right coalition. Indicators are in percentage points except population totals and income.

Location	Residents	Citizen adults	Left vote	Right vote	Employed	Swedish parents	Foreign heritage	Income SEK	Degree
Location			%	%					
Rörvik	1,244	908	26.3	71.3	82	82	18	22,900	31
Stockaryd	1,663	1,218	32.9	65.3	79	78	22	22,509	29
Sävsjö Ljunga	1,998	1,476	35.6	62.6	79	77	23	23,332	30
Sävsjö S	2,568	1,832	37.8	59.6	75	70	30	24,264	30
Sävsjö Vallsjö	2,174	1,499	38.5	58.9	80	67	33	25,306	30
Vrigstad	2,053	1,443	28.7	70.3	84	85	15	25,606	34
Source: SVT

== History ==
The area has been inhabited since early Stone Age. Both archeological finds and the five medieval churches from the 12th century stands as reminiscence from those days. A few kilometers from where the town Sävsjö is located today, was for instance the centre of the old administrative court house called Västra Härad Court.

== Today ==
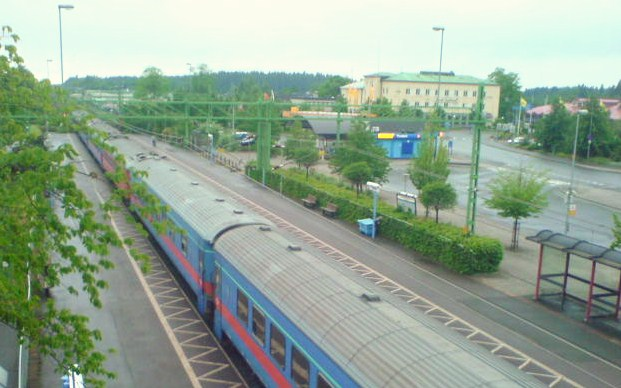
Train departing from Sävsjö station towards Malmö, with Sävsjö market place and Grand Hotel to the right.

Sävsjö Municipality is working hard to increase its population. It currently has a half-price offer when buying plots of land with the intention of building a house here.

Politically Sävsjö Municipality is a stronghold of the Kristdemokraterna, the Christian Democrats (12 mandates of 39). The party is the largest in the municipal assembly (kommunfullmäktige).

In contemporary Sweden today, Sävsjö Municipality is perhaps most known for the successful handball team Sävsjö HK.
