= Seal of New York (state) =

Official government emblem of the U.S. state of New York

Great Seal of the State of New York
- Armiger: State of New York
- Adopted: 1882
- Supporters: Liberty and Justice
- Motto: Excelsior, E Pluribus Unum
- Earlier version
- Use: Former Seal of New York used in 1901 until 2020

Coat of arms of the State of New York

Versions
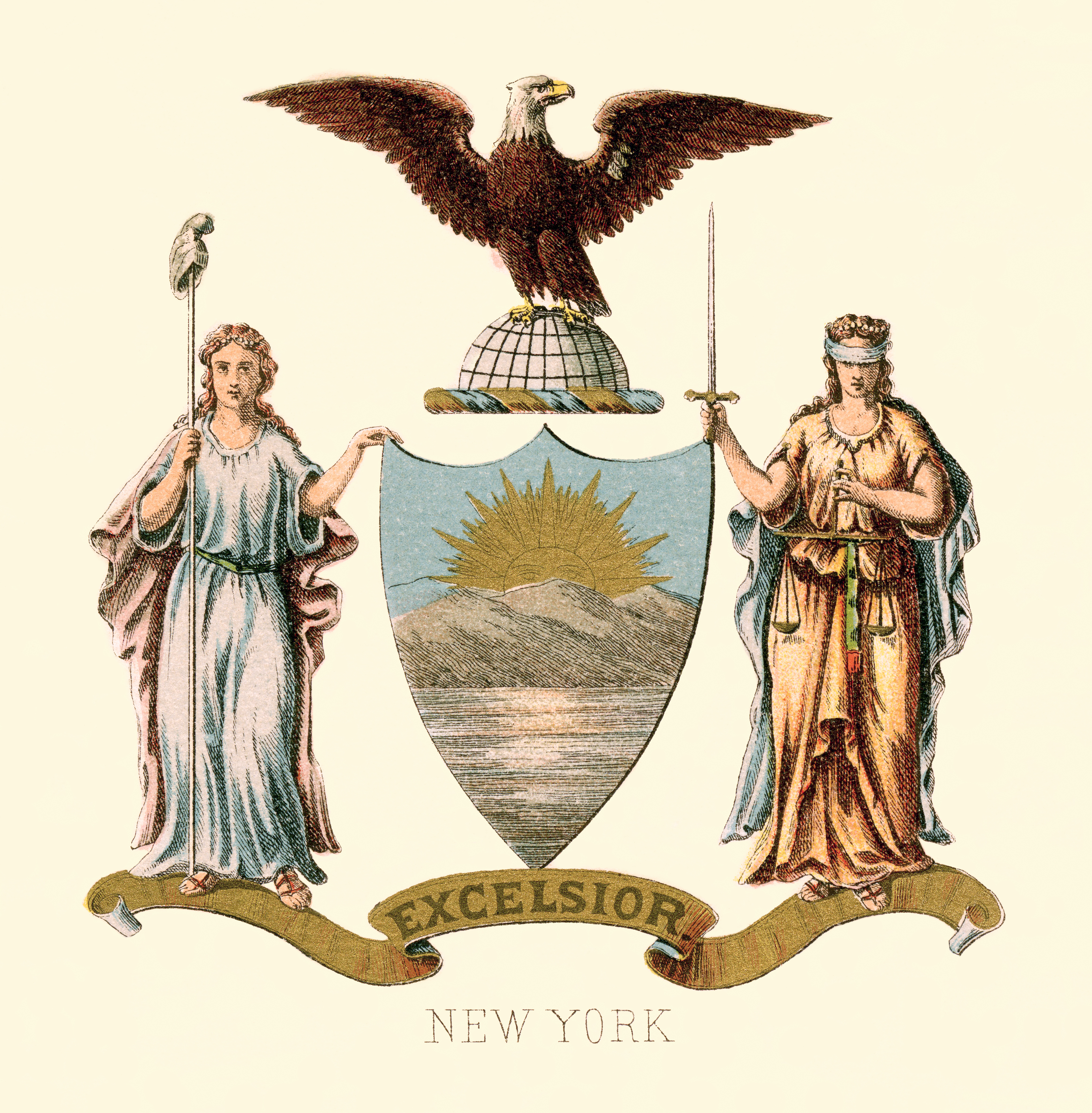
- Historical coat of arms, illustrated (1876)
- Armiger: State of New York
- Adopted: 1778
- Supporters: Liberty and Justice
- Motto: Excelsior, E Pluribus Unum
- Earlier version
- Use: Coat of Arms of New York used in 1896 until addition of second motto in 2020

The state seal of New York features the state arms (officially adopted in 1778) surrounded by the words "The Great Seal of the State of New York". A banner below shows the New York State motto Excelsior, Latin for "Ever Upward", and the secondary motto E Pluribus Unum, Latin for "Out of Many, One"—adopted in 2020.

Allegorical figures of Liberty (left) and Justice (right) support the shield and an American eagle spreads its wings above on a world globe. Liberty's left foot treads on a crown, a symbol of freedom from the Kingdom of Great Britain, and holds a staff topped with a Phrygian Cap, a symbol of freedom and the pursuit of liberty. Justice is blindfolded and holds a sword in one hand and a scale in the other, symbolizing impartiality and fairness.

The center shield displays a masted ship and a sloop on the Hudson River (symbols of inland and foreign commerce) bordered by a grassy shore and a mountain range with the sun rising behind it.

== History ==
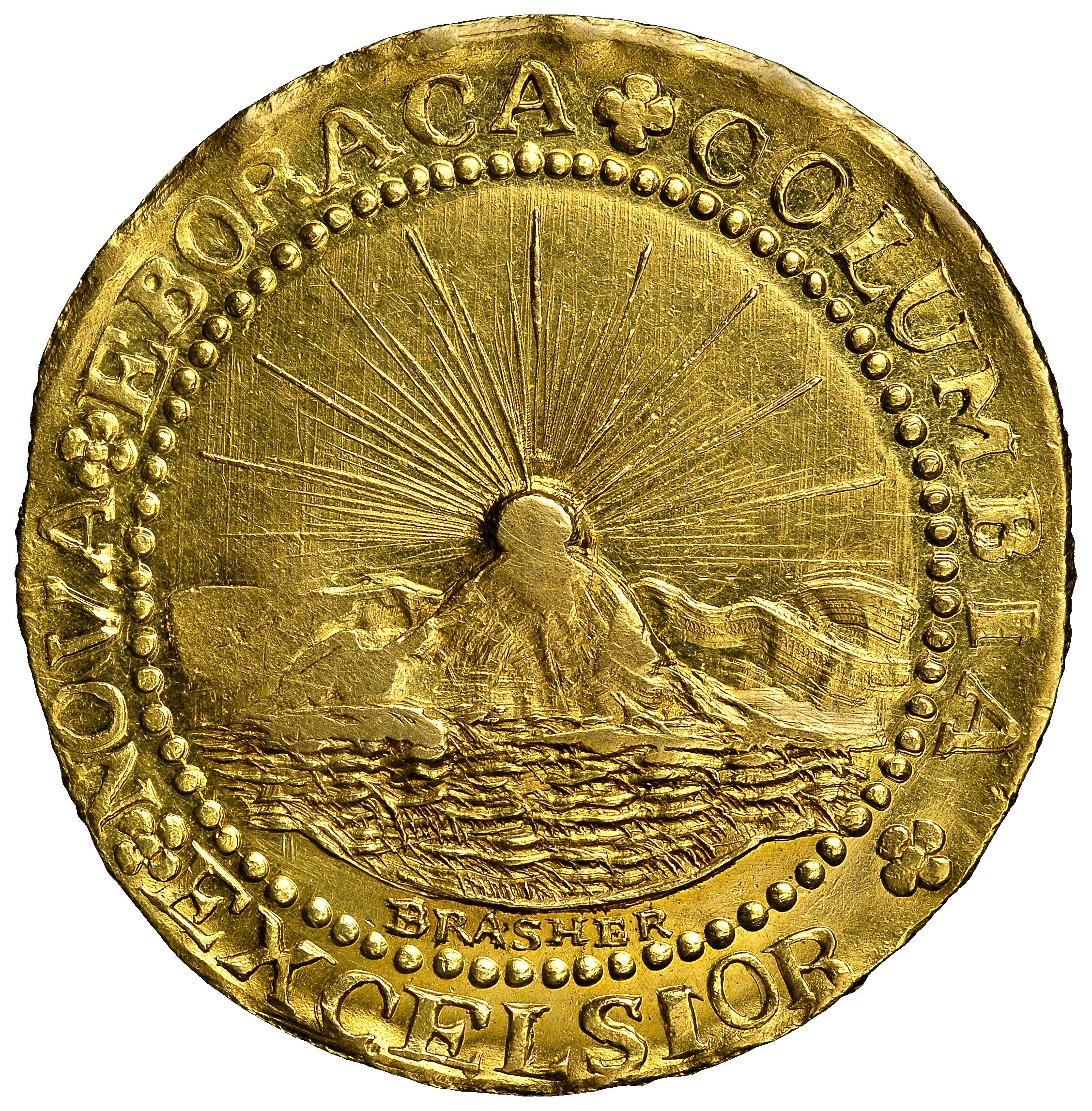
The original seal appeared on the Brasher Doubloon, a gold coin privately minted in New York City in 1787

The first seal of New York was created by a committee appointed April 15, 1777, with the intent that it be used "for all the purposes for which the Crown Seal was used under the Colony." On the front of the seal there is an image of a rising sun with the motto "Excelsior" and the legend "The Great Seal of the State of New York." On the back is an image of a rock in the ocean with the legend "Frustra," 'in vain', symbolizing how the strength of New York State would stand up against the waves that crashed against it.

The first seal was formally established by chapter 112 of the Laws of 1778, with some modifications in 1798 and 1809. There were apparently some informal variations over time as well, which led to the formation of a commission, in 1880, to determine the "exact description of the arms established in 1778." The commission's conclusions, which were reported to the New York Legislature in 1881 and included "a description of the arms in language such as might be sufficient for the exact arms of the state to be constructed," resulted in the fourth version of the seal, established by chapter 190 of the (New York State) laws of 1881.

In April 2020, New York passed a state budget which included a modification to the state arms; E Pluribus Unum ("Out of many, one") was appended to the existing motto.

Seal of the New York Court of Appeals

Seal of the New York State Police

== See also ==
- Coat of arms of New York
