= Results of the 1976 Swedish general election =

1976 Swedish general election results

General elections were held in Sweden on 19 September 1976. Results were published by the Statistical Central Bureau.

== National results ==
| Party | Votes | % | Seats | | | |
| Party | Votes | % | Con. | Lev. | Tot. | +/– |
|---|---|---|---|---|---|---|
| Swedish Social Democratic Party | 2,324,603 | 42.75 | 139 | 13 | 152 | –4 |
| Centre Party | 1,309,669 | 24.08 | 79 | 7 | 86 | –4 |
| Moderate Party | 847,672 | 15.59 | 50 | 5 | 55 | +4 |
| People's Party | 601,556 | 11.06 | 34 | 5 | 39 | +5 |
| Left Party Communists | 258,432 | 4.75 | 8 | 9 | 17 | –2 |
| Christian Democratic Unity | 73,844 | 1.36 | 0 | 0 | 0 | 0 |
| Communist Party | 17,309 | 0.32 | 0 | 0 | 0 | 0 |
| Other parties | 4,663 | 0.09 | 0 | 0 | 0 | 0 |
| Total | 5,437,748 | 100.00 | 310 | 39 | 349 | –1 |
| Valid votes | 5,437,748 | 99.65 | | | | |
| Invalid/blank votes | 19,295 | 0.35 | | | | |
| Total votes | 5,457,043 | 100.00 | | | | |
| Registered voters/turnout | 5,947,077 | 91.76 | | | | |
Source: Nohlen & Stöver

== Results by region ==
=== Percentage share ===
| Location | Turnout | Share | Votes | S | C | M | FP | VPK | KDS | Other | Left | Right |
|---|---|---|---|---|---|---|---|---|---|---|---|---|
| Götaland | 92.1 | 48.2 | 2,619,204 | 40.6 | 26.1 | 16.5 | 11.6 | 3.5 | 1.4 | 0.3 | 44.1 | 54.2 |
| Svealand | 91.6 | 37.0 | 2,012,547 | 42.7 | 20.8 | 17.5 | 11.7 | 5.8 | 1.0 | 0.6 | 48.5 | 50.0 |
| Norrland | 91.0 | 14.8 | 805,997 | 49.9 | 25.6 | 7.9 | 7.9 | 6.3 | 1.9 | 0.9 | 56.2 | 41.4 |
| Total | 91.8 | 100.0 | 5,437,748 | 42.7 | 24.1 | 15.6 | 11.1 | 4.8 | 1.4 | 0.4 | 47.5 | 50.7 |
Source: SCB

=== By votes ===
| Location | Turnout | Share | Votes | S | C | M | FP | VPK | KDS | Other | Left | Right |
|---|---|---|---|---|---|---|---|---|---|---|---|---|
| Götaland | 92.1 | 48.2 | 2,619,204 | 1,062,932 | 684,391 | 432,756 | 302,784 | 91,493 | 37,702 | 7,146 | 1,154,425 | 1,419,931 |
| Svealand | 91.6 | 37.0 | 2,012,547 | 859,264 | 418,876 | 351,608 | 234,981 | 116,145 | 20,590 | 11,083 | 975,409 | 1,005,465 |
| Norrland | 91.0 | 14.8 | 805,997 | 402,407 | 206,402 | 63,308 | 63,791 | 50,794 | 15,552 | 3,743 | 453,201 | 333,501 |
| Total | 91.8 | 100.0 | 5,437,748 | 2,324,603 | 1,309,669 | 847,672 | 601,556 | 258,432 | 73,844 | 21,972 | 2,583,035 | 2,758,997 |
Source: SCB

== Results by constituency ==
=== Percentage share ===
| Location | Land | Turnout | Share | Votes | S | C | M | FP | VPK | KDS | Other | Left | Right | Margin |
| Location | | % | % | | % | % | % | % | % | % | % | % | % | |
|---|---|---|---|---|---|---|---|---|---|---|---|---|---|---|
| Blekinge | G | 92.0 | 1.9 | 103,248 | 49.5 | 22.0 | 12.6 | 10.5 | 3.3 | 1.5 | 0.6 | 52.8 | 45.1 | 8,007 |
| Bohuslän | G | 91.7 | 3.2 | 175,069 | 37.6 | 25.8 | 15.5 | 16.3 | 3.7 | 1.1 | 0.1 | 41.3 | 57.6 | 28,476 |
| Gothenburg | G | 90.1 | 5.3 | 290,365 | 38.9 | 15.9 | 17.5 | 18.2 | 8.1 | 0.9 | 0.6 | 47.0 | 51.5 | 13,183 |
| Gotland | G | 90.7 | 0.7 | 36,105 | 37.7 | 37.3 | 13.4 | 8.3 | 2.6 | 0.6 | 0.1 | 40.2 | 59.0 | 6,784 |
| Gävleborg | N | 90.5 | 3.7 | 198,949 | 50.9 | 25.9 | 7.4 | 7.9 | 6.3 | 1.2 | 0.4 | 57.2 | 41.2 | 31,766 |
| Halland | G | 92.8 | 2.7 | 146,371 | 35.4 | 35.1 | 15.9 | 10.3 | 2.4 | 0.7 | 0.2 | 37.7 | 61.4 | 34,592 |
| Jämtland | N | 90.4 | 1.7 | 91,474 | 47.9 | 31.7 | 7.9 | 7.0 | 3.8 | 1.3 | 0.4 | 51.7 | 46.6 | 4,753 |
| Jönköping | G | 93.2 | 3.7 | 202,653 | 36.4 | 30.4 | 15.4 | 11.5 | 2.5 | 3.6 | 0.2 | 38.9 | 57.2 | 37,097 |
| Kalmar | G | 92.3 | 3.0 | 164,975 | 43.3 | 29.6 | 15.1 | 6.7 | 3.2 | 1.9 | 0.1 | 46.6 | 51.4 | 7,922 |
| Kopparberg | S | 90.9 | 3.5 | 189,286 | 46.3 | 30.2 | 9.3 | 8.1 | 4.2 | 1.4 | 0.3 | 50.6 | 47.7 | 5,473 |
| Kristianstad | G | 91.6 | 3.4 | 182,955 | 39.1 | 30.1 | 16.8 | 10.5 | 1.8 | 1.4 | 0.3 | 40.9 | 57.4 | 30,153 |
| Kronoberg | G | 92.2 | 2.1 | 113,411 | 37.6 | 34.2 | 15.4 | 7.6 | 3.5 | 1.4 | 0.3 | 41.1 | 57.2 | 18,193 |
| Fyrstadskretsen | G | 91.9 | 5.7 | 309,027 | 45.9 | 16.0 | 21.6 | 11.8 | 3.8 | 0.6 | 0.4 | 49.7 | 49.3 | 961 |
| Malmöhus | G | 93.6 | 3.4 | 184,759 | 42.1 | 27.1 | 17.8 | 10.9 | 1.4 | 0.7 | 0.1 | 43.5 | 55.7 | 22,553 |
| Norrbotten | N | 90.3 | 3.1 | 169,641 | 53.7 | 18.2 | 8.1 | 6.0 | 11.2 | 2.0 | 0.7 | 64.9 | 32.4 | 55,176 |
| Skaraborg | G | 91.8 | 3.2 | 175,734 | 34.8 | 34.4 | 15.3 | 10.7 | 2.5 | 2.1 | 0.2 | 37.3 | 60.4 | 40,537 |
| Stockholm | S | 90.3 | 8.7 | 471,070 | 38.1 | 13.3 | 24.8 | 13.3 | 8.8 | 0.8 | 0.9 | 47.0 | 51.4 | 20,758 |
| Stockholm County | S | 92.6 | 9.1 | 495,207 | 37.3 | 19.4 | 22.3 | 13.4 | 6.2 | 0.7 | 0.6 | 43.5 | 55.2 | 57,710 |
| Södermanland | S | 92.8 | 3.0 | 163,147 | 49.8 | 22.1 | 12.5 | 10.8 | 3.1 | 1.4 | 0.3 | 52.9 | 45.4 | 12,126 |
| Uppsala | S | 91.3 | 3.0 | 149,325 | 42.2 | 25.1 | 14.3 | 11.3 | 5.4 | 1.2 | 0.6 | 47.6 | 50.6 | 4,552 |
| Värmland | S | 92.2 | 3.6 | 196,183 | 46.1 | 25.8 | 13.2 | 9.8 | 4.0 | 0.7 | 0.3 | 50.1 | 48.8 | 2,512 |
| Västerbotten | N | 90.9 | 2.9 | 159,435 | 45.3 | 26.3 | 8.8 | 11.7 | 4.1 | 3.3 | 0.5 | 49.3 | 46.8 | 4,006 |
| Västernorrland | N | 92.7 | 3.4 | 186,498 | 50.4 | 28.4 | 7.3 | 6.8 | 5.0 | 1.8 | 0.3 | 55.4 | 42.5 | 23,999 |
| Västmanland | S | 91.7 | 3.0 | 163,608 | 50.3 | 21.0 | 11.6 | 11.2 | 4.3 | 1.2 | 0.4 | 54.6 | 43.8 | 17,747 |
| Älvsborg N | G | 92.3 | 2.9 | 155,343 | 39.3 | 30.4 | 13.3 | 12.6 | 3.0 | 1.4 | 0.1 | 42.3 | 56.2 | 21,617 |
| Älvsborg S | G | 93.6 | 2.2 | 118,587 | 38.9 | 28.4 | 18.9 | 9.4 | 2.9 | 1.2 | 0.1 | 41.8 | 56.8 | 17,757 |
| Örebro | S | 91.9 | 3.4 | 184,721 | 48.7 | 24.0 | 10.8 | 10.0 | 4.3 | 1.7 | 0.4 | 53.0 | 44.8 | 15,106 |
| Östergötland | G | 92.3 | 4.8 | 260,602 | 46.2 | 23.3 | 15.3 | 9.4 | 3.5 | 2.0 | 0.3 | 49.7 | 48.0 | 4,390 |
| Total | | 91.8 | 100.0 | 5,437,748 | 42.7 | 24.1 | 15.6 | 11.1 | 4.8 | 1.4 | 0.4 | 47.5 | 50.7 | 175,862 |
Source: SCB

=== By votes ===
| Location | Land | Turnout | Share | Votes | S | C | M | FP | VPK | KDS | Other | Left | Right | Margin |
| Location | | % | % | | | | | | | | | | | |
|---|---|---|---|---|---|---|---|---|---|---|---|---|---|---|
| Blekinge | G | 92.0 | 1.9 | 103,248 | 51,122 | 22,674 | 13,024 | 10,852 | 3,435 | 1,545 | 596 | 54,557 | 46,550 | 8,007 |
| Bohuslän | G | 91.7 | 3.2 | 175,069 | 65,809 | 45,153 | 27,151 | 28,454 | 6,473 | 1,864 | 165 | 72,282 | 100,758 | 28,476 |
| Gothenburg | G | 90.1 | 5.3 | 290,365 | 112,916 | 46,080 | 50,674 | 52,827 | 23,482 | 2,583 | 1,803 | 136,398 | 149,581 | 13,183 |
| Gotland | G | 90.7 | 0.7 | 36,105 | 13,594 | 13,463 | 4,847 | 2,999 | 931 | 230 | 41 | 14,525 | 21,309 | 6,784 |
| Gävleborg | N | 90.5 | 3.7 | 198,949 | 101,254 | 51,470 | 14,773 | 15,740 | 12,495 | 2,413 | 804 | 113,749 | 81,983 | 31,766 |
| Halland | G | 92.8 | 2.7 | 146,371 | 51,762 | 51,393 | 23,325 | 15,084 | 3,448 | 1,073 | 286 | 55,210 | 89,802 | 34,592 |
| Jämtland | N | 90.4 | 1.7 | 91,474 | 43,850 | 28,952 | 7,235 | 6,395 | 3,485 | 1,232 | 325 | 47,335 | 42,582 | 4,753 |
| Jönköping | G | 93.2 | 3.7 | 202,653 | 73,849 | 61,554 | 31,188 | 23,237 | 5,033 | 7,378 | 414 | 78,882 | 115,979 | 37,097 |
| Kalmar | G | 92.3 | 3.0 | 164,975 | 71,489 | 48,860 | 24,843 | 11,059 | 5,351 | 3,127 | 246 | 76,840 | 84,762 | 7,922 |
| Kopparberg | S | 90.9 | 3.5 | 189,286 | 87,669 | 57,205 | 17,604 | 15,425 | 8,038 | 2,698 | 647 | 95,707 | 90,234 | 5,473 |
| Kristianstad | G | 91.6 | 3.4 | 182,955 | 71,596 | 55,041 | 30,818 | 19,184 | 3,294 | 2,526 | 496 | 74,890 | 105,043 | 30,153 |
| Kronoberg | G | 92.2 | 2.1 | 113,411 | 42,638 | 38,737 | 17,506 | 8,600 | 4,012 | 1,624 | 294 | 46,650 | 64,843 | 18,193 |
| Fyrstadskretsen | G | 91.9 | 5.7 | 309,027 | 141,723 | 49,529 | 66,625 | 36,344 | 11,736 | 1,877 | 1,193 | 153,459 | 152,498 | 961 |
| Malmöhus | G | 93.6 | 3.4 | 184,759 | 77,771 | 50,048 | 32,832 | 20,108 | 2,664 | 1,205 | 131 | 80,435 | 102,988 | 22,553 |
| Norrbotten | N | 90.3 | 3.1 | 169,641 | 91,182 | 30,923 | 13,742 | 10,316 | 18,975 | 3,389 | 1,114 | 110,157 | 54,981 | 55,176 |
| Skaraborg | G | 91.8 | 3.2 | 175,734 | 61,075 | 60,387 | 26,860 | 18,832 | 4,467 | 3,764 | 349 | 65,542 | 106,079 | 40,537 |
| Stockholm | S | 90.3 | 8.7 | 471,070 | 179,710 | 62,543 | 116,787 | 62,680 | 41,542 | 3,642 | 4,166 | 221,252 | 242,010 | 20,758 |
| Stockholm County | S | 92.6 | 9.1 | 495,207 | 184,948 | 96,243 | 110,671 | 66,357 | 30,613 | 3,520 | 2,855 | 215,561 | 273,271 | 57,710 |
| Södermanland | S | 92.8 | 3.0 | 163,147 | 81,178 | 36,114 | 20,419 | 17,577 | 5,058 | 2,286 | 515 | 86,236 | 74,110 | 12,126 |
| Uppsala | S | 91.3 | 3.0 | 149,325 | 63,017 | 37,407 | 21,392 | 16,807 | 8,037 | 1,818 | 847 | 71,054 | 75,606 | 4,552 |
| Värmland | S | 92.2 | 3.6 | 196,183 | 90,503 | 50,630 | 25,918 | 19,286 | 7,843 | 1,466 | 537 | 98,346 | 95,834 | 2,512 |
| Västerbotten | N | 90.9 | 2.9 | 159,435 | 72,186 | 42,009 | 13,972 | 18,679 | 6,480 | 5,241 | 868 | 78,666 | 74,660 | 4,006 |
| Västernorrland | N | 92.7 | 3.4 | 186,498 | 93,935 | 53,048 | 13,586 | 12,661 | 9,359 | 3,277 | 632 | 103,294 | 79,295 | 23,999 |
| Västmanland | S | 91.7 | 3.0 | 163,608 | 82,245 | 34,361 | 18,936 | 18,311 | 7,110 | 1,944 | 701 | 89,355 | 71,608 | 17,747 |
| Älvsborg N | G | 92.3 | 2.9 | 155,343 | 61,029 | 47,153 | 20,611 | 19,509 | 4,627 | 2,248 | 166 | 65,656 | 87,273 | 21,617 |
| Älvsborg S | G | 93.6 | 2.2 | 118,587 | 46,174 | 33,734 | 22,467 | 11,174 | 3,444 | 1,431 | 163 | 49,618 | 67,375 | 17,757 |
| Örebro | S | 91.9 | 3.4 | 184,721 | 89,994 | 44,373 | 19,881 | 18,538 | 7,904 | 3,216 | 815 | 97,898 | 82,792 | 15,106 |
| Östergötland | G | 92.3 | 4.8 | 260,602 | 120,385 | 60,585 | 39,985 | 24,521 | 9,096 | 5,227 | 803 | 129,481 | 125,091 | 4,390 |
| Total | | 91.8 | 100.0 | 5,437,748 | 2,324,603 | 1,309,669 | 847,672 | 601,556 | 258,432 | 73,844 | 21,972 | 2,583,035 | 2,758,897 | 175,862 |
Source: SCB

== 1973–1976 bloc comparison ==
=== Percentage share ===
| Constituency | Land | Votes 1973 | Left 1973 | Right 1973 | Win 1973 | Votes 1976 | Left 1976 | Right 1976 | Win 1976 | Change |
| Constituency | | | % | % | % | | % | % | % | % |
|---|---|---|---|---|---|---|---|---|---|---|
| Blekinge | G | 98,425 | 53.71 | 44.26 | 9.45 | 103,248 | 52.84 | 45.09 | 7.75 | 1.70 |
| Bohuslän | G | 161,583 | 41.91 | 56.38 | 14.47 | 175,069 | 41.29 | 57.55 | 16.26 | 1.79 |
| Gothenburg | G | 282,771 | 46.58 | 50.96 | 4.38 | 290,365 | 46.97 | 51.51 | 4.54 | 0.16 |
| Gotland | G | 34,186 | 39.01 | 61.29 | 22.28 | 36,105 | 40.23 | 59.02 | 18.79 | 3.49 |
| Gävleborg | N | 189,221 | 58.26 | 39.73 | 18.53 | 198,949 | 57.17 | 41.21 | 15.96 | 2.57 |
| Halland | G | 134,086 | 39.26 | 59.53 | 20.27 | 146,371 | 37.72 | 61.35 | 23.63 | 3.36 |
| Jämtland | N | 86,774 | 52.32 | 45.75 | 6.57 | 91,474 | 51.75 | 46.55 | 5.20 | 1.37 |
| Jönköping | G | 192,883 | 40.89 | 53.32 | 12.43 | 202,653 | 38.92 | 57.23 | 18.31 | 5.88 |
| Kalmar | G | 157,126 | 47.73 | 49.67 | 1.94 | 164,975 | 46.58 | 51.38 | 4.80 | 2.86 |
| Kopparberg | S | 178,106 | 51.91 | 45.91 | 6.00 | 189,286 | 50.56 | 47.67 | 2.89 | 3.11 |
| Kristianstad | G | 172,529 | 43.07 | 55.12 | 12.05 | 182,955 | 40.93 | 57.41 | 16.48 | 4.43 |
| Kronoberg | G | 107,136 | 42.82 | 55.19 | 12.37 | 113,411 | 41.13 | 57.18 | 16.05 | 3.68 |
| Fyrstadskretsen | G | 302,027 | 51.61 | 47.18 | 4.43 | 309,027 | 49.66 | 49.35 | 0.31 | 4.12 |
| Malmöhus | G | 167,424 | 45.61 | 53.32 | 7.71 | 184,759 | 43.54 | 55.74 | 12.20 | 4.49 |
| Norrbotten | N | 157,383 | 65.53 | 31.64 | 33.89 | 169,641 | 64.94 | 32.41 | 32.53 | 1.36 |
| Skaraborg | G | 166,654 | 38.53 | 58.24 | 19.71 | 175,734 | 37.30 | 60.36 | 23.06 | 3.35 |
| Stockholm | S | 469,386 | 48.56 | 49.42 | 0.86 | 471,070 | 46.97 | 51.37 | 4.40 | 3.54 |
| Stockholm County | S | 452,123 | 45.27 | 52.95 | 7.68 | 495,207 | 43.53 | 55.18 | 11.65 | 3.97 |
| Södermanland | S | 154,732 | 54.48 | 43.32 | 11.16 | 163,147 | 52.86 | 45.43 | 7.43 | 3.73 |
| Uppsala | S | 139,874 | 48.45 | 49.28 | 0.83 | 149,325 | 47.58 | 50.63 | 3.05 | 2.22 |
| Värmland | S | 188,565 | 53.20 | 45.43 | 7.77 | 196,183 | 50.13 | 48.85 | 1.28 | 6.49 |
| Västerbotten | N | 150,036 | 48.86 | 46.46 | 2.40 | 159,435 | 49.34 | 46.83 | 2.51 | 0.11 |
| Västernorrland | N | 178,788 | 57.03 | 40.08 | 16.95 | 186,498 | 55.39 | 42.52 | 12.87 | 4.08 |
| Västmanland | S | 155,418 | 56.03 | 41.98 | 14.05 | 163,608 | 54.62 | 43.77 | 10.85 | 3.20 |
| Älvsborg N | G | 144,775 | 43.59 | 54.32 | 10.73 | 155,343 | 42.27 | 56.18 | 13.91 | 3.18 |
| Älvsborg S | G | 113,450 | 42.71 | 55.42 | 12.71 | 118,587 | 41.84 | 56.81 | 14.97 | 2.26 |
| Örebro | S | 177,310 | 54.55 | 42.69 | 11.86 | 184,721 | 53.00 | 44.82 | 8.18 | 3.68 |
| Östergötland | G | 247,375 | 51.34 | 45.62 | 5.72 | 260,602 | 49.69 | 48.00 | 1.69 | 4.03 |
| Total | | 5,160,146 | 48.89 | 48.81 | 0.08 | 5,437,748 | 47.50 | 50.74 | 3.24 | 3.32 |
Source: SCB

=== By votes ===
| Constituency | Land | Votes 1973 | Left 1973 | Right 1973 | Win 1973 | Votes 1976 | Left 1976 | Right 1976 | Win 1976 | Change |
| Constituency | # | | | | | | | | | |
|---|---|---|---|---|---|---|---|---|---|---|
| Blekinge | G | 98,425 | 52,860 | 43,563 | 9,297 | 103,248 | 54,557 | 46,550 | 8,007 | 1,290 |
| Bohuslän | G | 161,583 | 67,727 | 91,102 | 23,375 | 175,069 | 72,282 | 100,758 | 28,476 | 5,101 |
| Gothenburg | G | 282,771 | 131,716 | 144,094 | 12,378 | 290,365 | 136,398 | 149,581 | 13,183 | 805 |
| Gotland | G | 34,186 | 13,337 | 20,378 | 7,041 | 36,105 | 14,525 | 21,309 | 6,784 | 257 |
| Gävleborg | N | 189,221 | 110,242 | 75,173 | 35,069 | 198,949 | 113,749 | 81,983 | 31,766 | 3,303 |
| Halland | G | 134,086 | 52,636 | 79,816 | 27,180 | 146,371 | 55,210 | 89,802 | 34,592 | 7,412 |
| Jämtland | N | 86,774 | 45,400 | 39,696 | 5,704 | 91,474 | 47,335 | 42,582 | 4,753 | 951 |
| Jönköping | G | 192,883 | 78,873 | 102,710 | 23,837 | 202,653 | 78,882 | 115,979 | 37,097 | 13,260 |
| Kalmar | G | 157,126 | 75,003 | 78,042 | 3,039 | 164,975 | 76,840 | 84,762 | 7,922 | 4,883 |
| Kopparberg | S | 178,106 | 92,455 | 81,765 | 10,690 | 189,286 | 95,707 | 90,234 | 5,473 | 5,217 |
| Kristianstad | G | 172,529 | 74,309 | 95,092 | 20,783 | 182,955 | 74,890 | 105,043 | 30,153 | 9,370 |
| Kronoberg | G | 107,136 | 45,875 | 59,129 | 13,254 | 113,411 | 46,650 | 64,843 | 18,193 | 4,939 |
| Fyrstadskretsen | G | 302,027 | 155,886 | 142,504 | 13,382 | 309,027 | 153,459 | 152,498 | 961 | 12,421 |
| Malmöhus | G | 167,424 | 76,361 | 89,281 | 12,920 | 184,759 | 80,435 | 102,988 | 22,553 | 9,633 |
| Norrbotten | N | 157,383 | 103,128 | 49,794 | 53,334 | 169,641 | 110,157 | 54,981 | 55,176 | 1,842 |
| Skaraborg | G | 166,654 | 64,212 | 97,053 | 32,841 | 175,734 | 65,542 | 106,079 | 40,537 | 7,696 |
| Stockholm | S | 469,386 | 227,954 | 231,964 | 4,010 | 471,070 | 221,252 | 242,010 | 20,758 | 16,748 |
| Stockholm County | S | 452,123 | 204,669 | 239,389 | 34,720 | 495,207 | 215,561 | 273,271 | 57,710 | 22,990 |
| Södermanland | S | 154,732 | 84,293 | 67,027 | 17,266 | 163,147 | 86,236 | 74,110 | 12,126 | 5,140 |
| Uppsala | S | 139,874 | 67,767 | 68,936 | 1,169 | 149,325 | 71,054 | 75,606 | 4,552 | 3,383 |
| Värmland | S | 188,565 | 100,315 | 85,672 | 14,643 | 196,183 | 98,346 | 95,834 | 2,512 | 12,131 |
| Västerbotten | N | 150,036 | 73,308 | 69,714 | 3,594 | 159,435 | 78,666 | 74,660 | 4,006 | 412 |
| Västernorrland | N | 178,788 | 101,959 | 71,656 | 30,303 | 186,498 | 103,294 | 79,295 | 23,999 | 6,304 |
| Västmanland | S | 155,418 | 87,078 | 65,245 | 21,833 | 163,608 | 89,355 | 71,608 | 17,747 | 4,086 |
| Älvsborg N | G | 144,775 | 63,114 | 78,641 | 15,527 | 155,343 | 65,656 | 87,273 | 21,617 | 6,090 |
| Älvsborg S | G | 113,450 | 48,449 | 62,870 | 14,421 | 118,587 | 49,618 | 67,375 | 17,757 | 3,336 |
| Örebro | S | 177,310 | 96,727 | 75,699 | 21,028 | 184,721 | 97,898 | 82,792 | 15,106 | 5,922 |
| Östergötland | G | 247,375 | 127,003 | 112,853 | 14,150 | 260,602 | 129,481 | 125,091 | 4,390 | 9,760 |
| Total | | 5,160,146 | 2,522,656 | 2,518,858 | 3,798 | 5,437,748 | 2,583,035 | 2,758,897 | 175,862 | 179,660 |
Source: SCB

== Municipal summary ==
| Location | County | Turnout | Votes | S | C | M | FP | VPK | KDS | Other | Left | Right |
|---|---|---|---|---|---|---|---|---|---|---|---|---|
| Alvesta | Kronoberg | 92.5 | 12,431 | 36.2 | 37.6 | 14.4 | 7.0 | 2.6 | 1.6 | 0.6 | 38.9 | 59.0 |
| Aneby | Jönköping | 93.6 | 4,458 | 23.7 | 41.7 | 16.3 | 12.5 | 1.0 | 4.5 | 0.3 | 24.7 | 70.5 |
| Arjeplog | Norrbotten | 87.4 | 2,751 | 48.2 | 20.9 | 4.5 | 6.5 | 17.1 | 2.1 | 0.5 | 65.3 | 32.0 |
| Arvidsjaur | Norrbotten | 90.3 | 5,604 | 53.7 | 19.1 | 4.3 | 6.2 | 13.5 | 2.5 | 0.7 | 67.3 | 29.6 |
| Avesta | Kopparberg | 92.3 | 18,178 | 55.9 | 24.6 | 6.2 | 6.4 | 4.9 | 1.6 | 0.4 | 60.7 | 37.2 |
| Berg | Jämtland | 87.5 | 6,027 | 39.5 | 42.7 | 7.4 | 5.8 | 3.2 | 1.2 | 0.1 | 42.7 | 55.9 |
| Boden | Norrbotten | 91.3 | 19,110 | 53.8 | 18.7 | 10.0 | 7.6 | 7.2 | 2.2 | 0.6 | 61.0 | 36.2 |
| Bollnäs | Gävleborg | 89.9 | 18,903 | 45.2 | 30.8 | 6.2 | 8.9 | 6.8 | 1.6 | 0.5 | 52.0 | 45.9 |
| Borgholm | Kalmar | 91.8 | 7,581 | 25.8 | 50.1 | 14.2 | 5.2 | 2.5 | 2.2 | 0.1 | 28.3 | 69.5 |
| Borlänge | Kopparberg | 91.9 | 30,166 | 52.9 | 25.3 | 7.9 | 8.1 | 4.2 | 1.3 | 0.3 | 57.1 | 41.3 |
| Bräcke | Jämtland | 92.3 | 6,612 | 55.9 | 29.1 | 5.6 | 4.5 | 4.2 | 0.6 | 0.2 | 60.1 | 39.2 |
| Eksjö | Jönköping | 92.9 | 12,639 | 31.9 | 36.5 | 14.8 | 11.9 | 1.6 | 3.1 | 0.1 | 33.5 | 63.3 |
| Emmaboda | Kalmar | 93.7 | 7,746 | 45.8 | 34.7 | 10.5 | 4.3 | 2.6 | 1.7 | 0.4 | 48.4 | 49.5 |
| Falkenberg | Halland | 93.2 | 22,653 | 34.2 | 42.3 | 14.1 | 7.4 | 1.3 | 0.7 | 0.1 | 35.5 | 63.7 |
| Falun | Kopparberg | 90.8 | 32,507 | 38.0 | 30.8 | 14.2 | 11.7 | 3.8 | 1.1 | 0.4 | 41.8 | 56.7 |
| Gagnef | Kopparberg | 92.9 | 6,184 | 41.6 | 38.6 | 6.3 | 9.0 | 2.6 | 1.8 | 0.2 | 44.1 | 53.9 |
| Gotland | Gotland | 90.7 | 36,105 | 37.7 | 37.3 | 13.4 | 8.3 | 2.6 | 0.6 | 0.1 | 40.2 | 59.0 |
| Gislaved | Jönköping | 93.6 | 17,114 | 35.0 | 36.7 | 14.2 | 9.8 | 2.0 | 2.2 | 0.2 | 37.0 | 60.6 |
| Gnosjö | Jönköping | 95.5 | 5,328 | 28.7 | 34.8 | 16.6 | 11.7 | 1.7 | 6.4 | 0.1 | 30.4 | 63.2 |
| Gällivare | Norrbotten | 87.0 | 15,619 | 51.5 | 14.0 | 9.5 | 4.8 | 17.8 | 0.8 | 1.6 | 69.3 | 28.3 |
| Gävle | Gävleborg | 90.4 | 58,357 | 53.2 | 19.6 | 10.1 | 10.6 | 4.8 | 1.1 | 0.5 | 58.0 | 40.3 |
| Halmstad | Halland | 92.0 | 49,167 | 42.3 | 25.4 | 16.8 | 10.9 | 3.6 | 0.9 | 0.2 | 45.9 | 53.1 |
| Haparanda | Norrbotten | 88.8 | 4,949 | 46.6 | 25.9 | 12.1 | 4.4 | 8.9 | 1.3 | 0.7 | 55.5 | 42.4 |
| Hedemora | Kopparberg | 91.3 | 11,203 | 48.3 | 30.5 | 8.7 | 6.8 | 3.5 | 1.5 | 0.5 | 51.8 | 46.1 |
| Hofors | Gävleborg | 90.7 | 9,226 | 61.5 | 15.6 | 5.4 | 5.5 | 11.1 | 0.6 | 0.4 | 72.6 | 26.4 |
| Hudiksvall | Gävleborg | 89.6 | 24,611 | 43.1 | 35.4 | 6.5 | 6.3 | 7.2 | 1.1 | 0.4 | 50.3 | 48.2 |
| Hultsfred | Kalmar | 92.7 | 12,640 | 43.2 | 31.3 | 14.0 | 6.0 | 2.6 | 2.8 | 0.1 | 45.8 | 51.3 |
| Hylte | Halland | 94.1 | 7,560 | 35.4 | 44.0 | 11.8 | 6.6 | 1.3 | 0.7 | 0.2 | 36.7 | 62.3 |
| Härjedalen | Jämtland | 87.3 | 8,768 | 56.5 | 26.2 | 5.6 | 5.7 | 4.6 | 1.1 | 0.3 | 61.1 | 37.5 |
| Högsby | Kalmar | 93.4 | 5,640 | 44.3 | 31.2 | 13.4 | 4.8 | 3.2 | 3.0 | 0.0 | 47.5 | 49.4 |
| Jokkmokk | Norrbotten | 85.0 | 4,831 | 56.5 | 14.7 | 7.2 | 6.7 | 13.1 | 1.1 | 0.7 | 69.3 | 28.4 |
| Jönköping | Jönköping | 93.1 | 72,769 | 40.5 | 23.4 | 16.7 | 12.5 | 3.0 | 3.7 | 0.2 | 43.5 | 52.6 |
| Kalix | Norrbotten | 93.7 | 12,606 | 62.0 | 17.8 | 7.2 | 4.0 | 7.2 | 1.1 | 0.7 | 69.1 | 29.0 |
| Kalmar | Kalmar | 91.9 | 36,272 | 44.2 | 23.1 | 18.9 | 9.1 | 3.3 | 1.2 | 0.3 | 47.5 | 51.0 |
| Karlshamn | Blekinge | 91.0 | 21,128 | 51.4 | 20.9 | 11.6 | 9.0 | 4.9 | 2.0 | 0.3 | 56.2 | 41.5 |
| Karlskrona | Blekinge | 92.1 | 41,793 | 47.8 | 20.4 | 13.6 | 12.9 | 2.8 | 1.5 | 1.0 | 50.6 | 46.9 |
| Kiruna | Norrbotten | 85.1 | 17,083 | 56.8 | 12.2 | 6.5 | 7.0 | 15.8 | 1.1 | 0.5 | 72.6 | 25.8 |
| Krokom | Jämtland | 90.4 | 8,890 | 45.1 | 36.4 | 7.3 | 6.6 | 2.5 | 1.8 | 0.2 | 47.6 | 50.3 |
| Kungsbacka | Halland | 93.7 | 24,557 | 26.5 | 33.3 | 21.8 | 15.7 | 2.2 | 0.5 | 0.1 | 28.7 | 70.8 |
| Laholm | Halland | 92.5 | 13,792 | 26.8 | 51.1 | 13.2 | 7.2 | 1.2 | 0.5 | 0.1 | 28.0 | 71.4 |
| Leksand | Kopparberg | 90.7 | 8,977 | 35.2 | 38.3 | 11.7 | 10.0 | 2.0 | 2.7 | 0.1 | 37.2 | 60.0 |
| Lessebo | Kronoberg | 95.0 | 6,083 | 55.0 | 23.2 | 9.1 | 5.1 | 6.6 | 1.1 | 0.0 | 61.6 | 37.3 |
| Ljungby | Kronoberg | 92.0 | 17,397 | 33.0 | 39.9 | 14.8 | 7.3 | 2.6 | 2.1 | 0.3 | 35.5 | 62.0 |
| Ljusdal | Gävleborg | 87.4 | 14,834 | 44.8 | 32.9 | 5.4 | 6.5 | 8.3 | 1.6 | 0.3 | 53.1 | 44.9 |
| Ludvika | Kopparberg | 90.4 | 22,021 | 57.4 | 19.5 | 7.7 | 6.3 | 7.8 | 0.9 | 0.4 | 65.2 | 33.5 |
| Luleå | Norrbotten | 91.4 | 42,612 | 50.9 | 18.6 | 10.3 | 8.3 | 9.7 | 1.7 | 0.6 | 60.6 | 37.1 |
| Malung | Kopparberg | 92.7 | 8,454 | 46.3 | 32.5 | 8.3 | 8.4 | 3.2 | 1.1 | 0.2 | 49.5 | 49.3 |
| Markaryd | Kronoberg | 92.2 | 7,623 | 40.5 | 34.6 | 11.9 | 7.1 | 3.1 | 2.6 | 0.3 | 43.5 | 53.6 |
| Mora | Kopparberg | 89.5 | 12,209 | 36.6 | 41.2 | 11.0 | 7.0 | 2.7 | 1.0 | 0.6 | 39.2 | 59.2 |
| Mönsterås | Kalmar | 92.4 | 8,823 | 48.3 | 26.0 | 13.5 | 4.7 | 4.5 | 2.9 | 0.0 | 52.8 | 44.3 |
| Mörbylånga | Kalmar | 92.6 | 7,915 | 35.2 | 35.8 | 18.6 | 7.9 | 1.8 | 0.6 | 0.1 | 37.1 | 62.3 |
| Nordanstig | Gävleborg | 90.0 | 7,955 | 39.9 | 40.6 | 3.8 | 6.3 | 6.7 | 2.2 | 0.4 | 46.6 | 50.8 |
| Nybro | Kalmar | 93.1 | 14,805 | 45.3 | 30.9 | 12.7 | 5.3 | 3.8 | 2.0 | 0.1 | 49.1 | 48.9 |
| Nässjö | Jönköping | 93.0 | 22,660 | 41.1 | 28.6 | 12.7 | 11.9 | 2.9 | 2.4 | 0.3 | 44.1 | 53.3 |
| Ockelbo | Gävleborg | 90.4 | 4,535 | 52.2 | 33.0 | 5.8 | 5.1 | 2.8 | 0.7 | 0.4 | 55.1 | 43.9 |
| Olofström | Blekinge | 92.7 | 9,583 | 51.3 | 23.5 | 10.2 | 8.3 | 4.0 | 2.3 | 0.4 | 55.3 | 42.0 |
| Orsa | Kopparberg | 87.6 | 4,744 | 37.8 | 38.3 | 9.7 | 7.7 | 4.5 | 1.9 | 0.1 | 42.4 | 55.6 |
| Oskarshamn | Kalmar | 92.3 | 18,746 | 49.2 | 22.3 | 13.4 | 8.8 | 3.3 | 2.6 | 0.2 | 52.6 | 44.6 |
| Ovanåker | Gävleborg | 92.1 | 9,317 | 40.1 | 39.1 | 6.0 | 9.4 | 2.5 | 2.7 | 0.2 | 42.5 | 54.5 |
| Pajala | Norrbotten | 88.7 | 5,978 | 46.7 | 17.1 | 8.2 | 2.8 | 22.7 | 2.1 | 0.4 | 69.4 | 28.1 |
| Piteå | Norrbotten | 93.7 | 24,412 | 57.8 | 20.7 | 5.8 | 4.8 | 6.4 | 4.1 | 0.4 | 64.2 | 31.3 |
| Ragunda | Jämtland | 92.1 | 5,464 | 55.2 | 30.4 | 5.2 | 4.0 | 3.7 | 1.4 | 0.1 | 58.9 | 39.6 |
| Ronneby | Blekinge | 92.1 | 20,158 | 50.4 | 25.9 | 11.3 | 8.4 | 2.9 | 0.8 | 0.3 | 53.3 | 45.6 |
| Rättvik | Kopparberg | 86.5 | 7,202 | 34.4 | 38.7 | 12.6 | 8.9 | 3.7 | 1.4 | 0.2 | 38.1 | 60.2 |
| Sandviken | Gävleborg | 92.0 | 29,067 | 57.7 | 20.6 | 7.8 | 6.8 | 5.8 | 0.9 | 0.2 | 63.6 | 35.3 |
| Smedjebacken | Kopparberg | 92.5 | 8,731 | 60.3 | 21.3 | 6.3 | 5.7 | 5.3 | 1.0 | 0.2 | 65.5 | 33.3 |
| Strömsund | Jämtland | 91.2 | 12,402 | 54.6 | 29.9 | 4.9 | 4.2 | 4.8 | 1.3 | 0.4 | 59.4 | 38.9 |
| Säter | Kopparberg | 92.0 | 6,989 | 39.4 | 39.9 | 8.3 | 7.0 | 2.9 | 2.2 | 0.2 | 42.3 | 55.3 |
| Sävsjö | Jönköping | 92.2 | 7,860 | 24.5 | 43.2 | 16.5 | 10.7 | 1.6 | 3.5 | 0.0 | 26.1 | 70.4 |
| Söderhamn | Gävleborg | 92.2 | 22,144 | 57.2 | 21.7 | 6.3 | 5.7 | 8.0 | 0.7 | 0.4 | 65.2 | 33.7 |
| Sölvesborg | Blekinge | 92.4 | 10,586 | 49.0 | 21.5 | 15.4 | 10.0 | 2.8 | 1.2 | 0.0 | 51.8 | 46.9 |
| Tingsryd | Kronoberg | 90.3 | 10,111 | 31.4 | 42.3 | 17.2 | 5.0 | 3.1 | 1.0 | 0.0 | 34.4 | 64.5 |
| Torsås | Kalmar | 91.5 | 5,397 | 30.8 | 42.7 | 16.7 | 6.2 | 0.8 | 2.8 | 0.0 | 31.6 | 65.6 |
| Tranås | Jönköping | 92.4 | 12,778 | 41.0 | 25.6 | 15.5 | 11.7 | 2.3 | 3.7 | 0.2 | 43.3 | 52.8 |
| Uppvidinge | Kronoberg | 92.1 | 7,841 | 42.0 | 35.1 | 11.2 | 5.2 | 5.7 | 0.8 | 0.0 | 47.6 | 51.5 |
| Vaggeryd | Jönköping | 94.6 | 7,775 | 34.4 | 32.3 | 14.8 | 9.1 | 3.1 | 6.1 | 0.1 | 37.5 | 56.2 |
| Vansbro | Kopparberg | 90.9 | 6,022 | 42.6 | 36.3 | 7.9 | 5.9 | 4.5 | 2.7 | 0.0 | 47.1 | 50.1 |
| Varberg | Halland | 92.7 | 28,642 | 36.1 | 37.7 | 13.3 | 9.5 | 2.1 | 0.8 | 0.5 | 38.2 | 60.5 |
| Vetlanda | Jönköping | 92.6 | 19,252 | 32.0 | 38.9 | 14.1 | 9.8 | 1.8 | 3.3 | 0.2 | 33.8 | 62.7 |
| Vimmerby | Kalmar | 93.3 | 11,234 | 34.1 | 42.9 | 14.8 | 4.7 | 2.1 | 1.4 | 0.1 | 36.2 | 62.4 |
| Värnamo | Jönköping | 93.8 | 20,020 | 32.3 | 34.0 | 15.7 | 10.6 | 2.6 | 4.7 | 0.2 | 34.9 | 60.2 |
| Västervik | Kalmar | 91.4 | 28,176 | 48.0 | 25.8 | 14.1 | 6.0 | 4.4 | 1.6 | 0.1 | 52.4 | 45.9 |
| Växjö | Kronoberg | 92.2 | 41,514 | 36.8 | 30.5 | 17.7 | 9.9 | 3.7 | 1.1 | 0.3 | 40.3 | 58.0 |
| Åre | Jämtland | 91.0 | 6,412 | 41.6 | 35.0 | 9.3 | 9.1 | 2.5 | 2.2 | 0.2 | 44.1 | 53.4 |
| Älmhult | Kronoberg | 92.8 | 10,411 | 40.6 | 32.6 | 16.6 | 5.7 | 2.8 | 1.5 | 0.2 | 43.4 | 54.9 |
| Älvdalen | Kopparberg | 88.4 | 5,699 | 38.4 | 41.0 | 6.1 | 8.4 | 3.2 | 1.6 | 1.2 | 41.6 | 55.6 |
| Älvsbyn | Norrbotten | 91.6 | 6,188 | 54.0 | 19.3 | 3.9 | 4.7 | 12.9 | 4.8 | 0.4 | 66.9 | 27.8 |
| Östersund | Jämtland | 90.7 | 36,899 | 44.3 | 30.6 | 10.3 | 9.1 | 3.9 | 1.3 | 0.5 | 48.2 | 50.0 |
| Överkalix | Norrbotten | 89.8 | 3,712 | 58.5 | 21.0 | 3.7 | 2.4 | 13.4 | 0.5 | 0.5 | 71.9 | 27.2 |
| Övertorneå | Norrbotten | 91.1 | 4,186 | 44.3 | 29.7 | 8.1 | 2.6 | 13.5 | 1.2 | 0.5 | 57.8 | 40.4 |
| Total | | 92.8 | 5,437,748 | 42.7 | 24.1 | 15.6 | 11.1 | 4.8 | 1.4 | 0.4 | 47.5 | 50.7 |
Source: SCB

== Results by municipality ==
Votes by municipality. The municipalities are the color of the party that got the most votes within the coalition that won relative majority. Some municipalities have been split since 1976, so may be different to apparent results.

Cartogram of the map to the left with each municipality rescaled to the number of valid votes cast.

Map showing the voting shifts from the 1973 to the 1976 election. Darker blue indicates a municipality voted more towards the parties that formed the centre-right bloc. Darker red indicates a municipality voted more towards the parties that form the left-wing bloc.

Votes by municipality as a scale from red/Left-wing bloc to blue/Centre-right bloc.

Cartogram of vote with each municipality rescaled in proportion to number of valid votes cast. Deeper blue represents a relative majority for the centre-right coalition, brighter red represents a relative majority for the left-wing coalition.

The listing of the results have been made with the 21st-century county mergers in mind to enable consistency. As a result, the Scanian and West Gothian constituencies that were in separate counties as of 1973 have been listed under their current counties, although the names of the original constituency from 1976 are included. "Share" denotes how large a share of the constituency each municipality had as well as the share of the national vote of 5,168,996 held by the overall constituency.

Counties not in accordance with provinces include the three Småland counties of Jönköping, Kalmar (including Öland) and Kronoberg. From an enlarged perspective, the three provinces of Västergötland, Bohuslän and Dalsland form Västra Götaland. In 1976 those consisted of three separate counties, namely, Bohuslän, Skaraborg and Älvsborg. Skåne County did not exist in 1976 either, with the province divided between Kristianstad County in the north and Malmöhus County in the south. Örebro County is divided between three separate provinces centered around Närke. As a result, Västmanland County is smaller than the province. Stockholm County is also consisting part of the provinces of Södermanland and Uppland, the latter of which forms Uppsala County in its north. Farther north, Gävleborg is a merger between Gästrikland and Hälsingland, Västernorrland consists of Medelpad and Ångermanland, whereas Lapland is divided between Västerbotten and Norrbotten counties. Härjedalen is a single municipality roughly corresponding with the provincial borders, merged into Jämtland County.

Regarding constituency results, two votes for the Left Party Communists in the Västerbotten constituency were not located towards any municipality in the official results. Therefore the municipal totals for the left bloc were off by two votes in the municipal and constituency count.

=== Blekinge ===
| Location | Turnout | Share | Votes | S | C | M | FP | VPK | KDS | Other | L-vote | R-vote | Left | Right | Margin |
| Location | % | % | | % | % | % | % | % | % | % | | | % | % | |
|---|---|---|---|---|---|---|---|---|---|---|---|---|---|---|---|
| Karlshamn | 91.0 | 20.5 | 21,128 | 51.4 | 20.9 | 11.6 | 9.0 | 4.9 | 2.0 | 0.3 | 11,880 | 8,764 | 56.2 | 41.5 | 3,116 |
| Karlskrona | 92.1 | 40.5 | 41,793 | 47.8 | 20.4 | 13.6 | 12.9 | 2.8 | 1.5 | 1.0 | 21,150 | 19,616 | 50.6 | 46.9 | 1,534 |
| Olofström | 92.7 | 9.3 | 9,583 | 51.3 | 23.5 | 10.2 | 8.3 | 4.0 | 2.3 | 0.4 | 5,301 | 4,025 | 55.3 | 42.0 | 1,276 |
| Ronneby | 92.1 | 19.5 | 20,158 | 50.4 | 25.9 | 11.3 | 8.4 | 2.9 | 0.8 | 0.3 | 10,739 | 9,182 | 53.3 | 45.6 | 1,557 |
| Sölvesborg | 92.4 | 10.3 | 10,586 | 49.0 | 21.5 | 15.4 | 10.0 | 2.8 | 1.2 | 0.0 | 5,487 | 4,963 | 51.8 | 46.9 | 524 |
| Total | 92.0 | 1.9 | 103,248 | 49.5 | 22.0 | 12.6 | 10.5 | 3.3 | 1.5 | 0.6 | 54,557 | 46,550 | 52.8 | 45.1 | 8,007 |
Source: SCB

=== Dalarna ===
Kopparberg County

| Location | Turnout | Share | Votes | S | C | M | FP | VPK | KDS | Other | L-vote | R-vote | Left | Right | Margin |
| Location | % | % | | % | % | % | % | % | % | % | | | % | % | |
|---|---|---|---|---|---|---|---|---|---|---|---|---|---|---|---|
| Avesta | 92.3 | 9.6 | 18,178 | 55.9 | 24.6 | 6.2 | 6.4 | 4.9 | 1.6 | 0.4 | 11,043 | 6,771 | 60.7 | 37.2 | 4,272 |
| Borlänge | 91.9 | 15.9 | 30,166 | 52.9 | 25.3 | 7.9 | 8.1 | 4.2 | 1.3 | 0.3 | 17,222 | 12,460 | 57.1 | 41.3 | 4,762 |
| Falun | 90.8 | 17.2 | 32,507 | 38.0 | 30.8 | 14.2 | 11.7 | 3.8 | 1.1 | 0.4 | 13,602 | 18,422 | 41.8 | 56.7 | 4,820 |
| Gagnef | 92.9 | 3.3 | 6,184 | 41.6 | 38.6 | 6.3 | 9.0 | 2.6 | 1.8 | 0.2 | 2,728 | 3,333 | 44.1 | 53.9 | 605 |
| Hedemora | 91.3 | 5.9 | 11,203 | 48.3 | 30.5 | 8.7 | 6.8 | 3.5 | 1.5 | 0.5 | 5,803 | 5,167 | 51.8 | 46.1 | 636 |
| Leksand | 90.7 | 4.7 | 8,977 | 35.2 | 38.3 | 11.7 | 10.0 | 2.0 | 2.7 | 0.1 | 3,339 | 5,389 | 37.2 | 60.0 | 2,050 |
| Ludvika | 90.4 | 11.6 | 22,021 | 57.4 | 19.5 | 7.7 | 6.3 | 7.8 | 0.9 | 0.4 | 14,353 | 7,378 | 65.2 | 33.5 | 6,975 |
| Malung | 92.7 | 4.5 | 8,454 | 46.3 | 32.5 | 8.3 | 8.4 | 3.2 | 1.1 | 0.2 | 4,183 | 4,164 | 49.5 | 49.3 | 19 |
| Mora | 89.5 | 6.5 | 12,209 | 36.6 | 41.2 | 11.0 | 7.0 | 2.7 | 1.0 | 0.6 | 4,792 | 7,225 | 39.2 | 59.2 | 2,433 |
| Orsa | 87.6 | 2.5 | 4,744 | 37.8 | 38.3 | 9.7 | 7.7 | 4.5 | 1.9 | 0.1 | 2,010 | 2,637 | 42.4 | 55.6 | 627 |
| Rättvik | 86.5 | 3.8 | 7,202 | 34.4 | 38.7 | 12.6 | 8.9 | 3.7 | 1.4 | 0.2 | 2,744 | 4,336 | 38.1 | 60.2 | 1,592 |
| Smedjebacken | 92.5 | 4.6 | 8,731 | 60.3 | 21.3 | 6.3 | 5.7 | 5.3 | 1.0 | 0.2 | 5,723 | 2,905 | 65.5 | 33.3 | 2,818 |
| Säter | 92.0 | 3.7 | 6,989 | 39.4 | 39.9 | 8.3 | 7.0 | 2.9 | 2.2 | 0.2 | 2,958 | 3,862 | 42.3 | 55.3 | 904 |
| Vansbro | 90.9 | 3.2 | 6,022 | 42.6 | 36.3 | 7.9 | 5.9 | 4.5 | 2.7 | 0.0 | 2,835 | 3,018 | 47.1 | 50.1 | 183 |
| Älvdalen | 88.4 | 3.0 | 5,699 | 38.4 | 41.0 | 6.1 | 8.4 | 3.2 | 1.6 | 1.2 | 2,372 | 3,167 | 41.6 | 55.6 | 795 |
| Total | 90.9 | 3.5 | 189,286 | 46.3 | 30.2 | 9.3 | 8.1 | 4.2 | 1.4 | 0.3 | 95,707 | 90,234 | 50.6 | 47.7 | 5,473 |
Source: SCB

=== Gotland ===
| Location | Turnout | Share | Votes | S | C | M | FP | VPK | KDS | Other | L-vote | R-vote | Left | Right | Margin |
| Location | % | % | | % | % | % | % | % | % | % | | | % | % | |
|---|---|---|---|---|---|---|---|---|---|---|---|---|---|---|---|
| Gotland | 90.7 | 100.0 | 36,105 | 37.7 | 37.3 | 13.4 | 8.3 | 2.6 | 0.6 | 0.1 | 14,525 | 21,309 | 40.2 | 59.0 | 6,784 |
| Total | 90.7 | 0.7 | 36,105 | 37.7 | 37.3 | 13.4 | 8.3 | 2.6 | 0.6 | 0.1 | 14,525 | 21,309 | 40.2 | 59.0 | 6,784 |
Source: SCB

=== Gävleborg ===
| Location | Turnout | Share | Votes | S | C | M | FP | VPK | KDS | Other | L-vote | R-vote | Left | Right | Margin |
| Location | % | % | | % | % | % | % | % | % | % | | | % | % | |
|---|---|---|---|---|---|---|---|---|---|---|---|---|---|---|---|
| Bollnäs | 89.9 | 9.5 | 18,903 | 45.2 | 30.8 | 6.2 | 8.9 | 6.8 | 1.6 | 0.5 | 9,834 | 8,669 | 52.0 | 45.9 | 1,165 |
| Gävle | 90.4 | 29.3 | 58,357 | 53.2 | 19.6 | 10.1 | 10.6 | 4.8 | 1.1 | 0.5 | 33,867 | 23,534 | 58.0 | 40.3 | 10,333 |
| Hofors | 90.7 | 4.6 | 9,226 | 61.5 | 15.6 | 5.4 | 5.5 | 11.1 | 0.6 | 0.4 | 6,700 | 2,438 | 72.6 | 26.4 | 4,262 |
| Hudiksvall | 89.6 | 12.4 | 24,611 | 43.1 | 35.4 | 6.5 | 6.3 | 7.2 | 1.1 | 0.4 | 12,388 | 11,851 | 50.3 | 48.2 | 537 |
| Ljusdal | 87.4 | 7.5 | 14,834 | 44.8 | 32.9 | 5.4 | 6.5 | 8.3 | 1.6 | 0.3 | 7,882 | 6,659 | 53.1 | 44.9 | 1,223 |
| Nordanstig | 90.0 | 4.0 | 7,955 | 39.9 | 40.6 | 3.8 | 6.3 | 6.7 | 2.2 | 0.4 | 3,708 | 4,040 | 46.6 | 50.8 | 332 |
| Ockelbo | 90.4 | 2.3 | 4,535 | 52.2 | 33.0 | 5.8 | 5.1 | 2.8 | 0.7 | 0.4 | 2,497 | 1,991 | 55.1 | 43.9 | 506 |
| Ovanåker | 92.1 | 4.7 | 9,317 | 40.1 | 39.1 | 6.0 | 9.4 | 2.5 | 2.7 | 0.2 | 3,961 | 5,082 | 42.5 | 54.5 | 1,121 |
| Sandviken | 92.0 | 14.6 | 29,067 | 57.7 | 20.6 | 7.8 | 6.8 | 5.8 | 0.9 | 0.2 | 18,475 | 10,260 | 63.6 | 35.3 | 8,215 |
| Söderhamn | 92.2 | 11.1 | 22,144 | 57.2 | 21.7 | 6.3 | 5.7 | 8.0 | 0.7 | 0.4 | 14,437 | 7,459 | 65.2 | 33.7 | 6,978 |
| Total | 90.5 | 3.7 | 198,949 | 50.9 | 25.9 | 7.4 | 7.9 | 6.3 | 1.2 | 0.4 | 113,749 | 81,983 | 57.2 | 41.2 | 31,766 |
Source: SCB

=== Halland ===
| Location | Turnout | Share | Votes | S | C | M | FP | VPK | KDS | Other | L-vote | R-vote | Left | Right | Margin |
| Location | % | % | | % | % | % | % | % | % | % | | | % | % | |
|---|---|---|---|---|---|---|---|---|---|---|---|---|---|---|---|
| Falkenberg | 93.2 | 15.5 | 22,653 | 34.2 | 42.3 | 14.1 | 7.4 | 1.3 | 0.7 | 0.1 | 8,032 | 14,433 | 35.5 | 63.7 | 6,401 |
| Halmstad | 92.0 | 33.6 | 49,167 | 42.3 | 25.4 | 16.8 | 10.9 | 3.6 | 0.9 | 0.2 | 22,564 | 26,090 | 45.9 | 53.1 | 3,526 |
| Hylte | 94.1 | 5.2 | 7,560 | 35.4 | 44.0 | 11.8 | 6.6 | 1.3 | 0.7 | 0.2 | 2,774 | 4,712 | 36.7 | 62.3 | 1,938 |
| Kungsbacka | 93.7 | 16.8 | 24,557 | 26.5 | 33.3 | 21.8 | 15.7 | 2.2 | 0.5 | 0.1 | 7,037 | 17,377 | 28.7 | 70.8 | 10,340 |
| Laholm | 92.5 | 9.4 | 13,792 | 26.8 | 51.1 | 13.2 | 7.2 | 1.2 | 0.5 | 0.1 | 3,859 | 9,854 | 28.0 | 71.4 | 5,995 |
| Varberg | 92.7 | 19.6 | 28,642 | 36.1 | 37.7 | 13.3 | 9.5 | 2.1 | 0.8 | 0.5 | 10,944 | 17,336 | 38.2 | 60.5 | 6,392 |
| Total | 92.8 | 2.7 | 146,371 | 35.4 | 35.1 | 15.9 | 10.3 | 2.4 | 0.7 | 0.2 | 55,210 | 89,802 | 37.7 | 61.4 | 34,592 |
Source: SCB

=== Jämtland ===
| Location | Turnout | Share | Votes | S | C | M | FP | VPK | KDS | Other | L-vote | R-vote | Left | Right | Margin |
| Location | % | % | | % | % | % | % | % | % | % | | | % | % | |
|---|---|---|---|---|---|---|---|---|---|---|---|---|---|---|---|
| Berg | 87.5 | 6.6 | 6,027 | 39.5 | 42.7 | 7.4 | 5.8 | 3.2 | 1.2 | 0.1 | 2,575 | 3,368 | 42.7 | 55.9 | 793 |
| Bräcke | 92.3 | 7.2 | 6,612 | 55.9 | 29.1 | 5.6 | 4.5 | 4.2 | 0.6 | 0.2 | 3,971 | 2,589 | 60.1 | 39.2 | 1,382 |
| Härjedalen | 87.3 | 9.6 | 8,768 | 56.5 | 26.2 | 5.6 | 5.7 | 4.6 | 1.1 | 0.3 | 5,357 | 3,285 | 61.1 | 37.5 | 2,072 |
| Krokom | 90.4 | 9.7 | 8,890 | 45.1 | 36.4 | 7.3 | 6.6 | 2.5 | 1.8 | 0.2 | 4,233 | 4,469 | 47.6 | 50.3 | 236 |
| Ragunda | 92.1 | 6.0 | 5,464 | 55.2 | 30.4 | 5.2 | 4.0 | 3.7 | 1.4 | 0.1 | 3,218 | 2,163 | 58.9 | 39.6 | 1,055 |
| Strömsund | 91.2 | 13.6 | 12,402 | 54.6 | 29.9 | 4.9 | 4.2 | 4.8 | 1.3 | 0.4 | 7,365 | 4,825 | 59.4 | 38.9 | 2,540 |
| Åre | 91.0 | 7.0 | 6,412 | 41.6 | 35.0 | 9.3 | 9.1 | 2.5 | 2.2 | 0.2 | 2,829 | 3,424 | 44.1 | 53.4 | 595 |
| Östersund | 90.7 | 40.3 | 36,899 | 44.3 | 30.6 | 10.3 | 9.1 | 3.9 | 1.3 | 0.5 | 17,787 | 18,459 | 48.2 | 50.0 | 672 |
| Total | 90.4 | 1.7 | 91,474 | 47.9 | 31.7 | 7.9 | 7.0 | 3.8 | 1.3 | 0.4 | 47,335 | 42,582 | 51.7 | 46.6 | 4,753 |
Source: SCB

=== Jönköping ===
| Location | Turnout | Share | Votes | S | C | M | FP | VPK | KDS | Other | L-vote | R-vote | Left | Right | Margin |
| Location | % | % | | % | % | % | % | % | % | % | | | % | % | |
|---|---|---|---|---|---|---|---|---|---|---|---|---|---|---|---|
| Aneby | 93.6 | 2.2 | 4,458 | 23.7 | 41.7 | 16.3 | 12.5 | 1.0 | 4.5 | 0.3 | 1,099 | 3,144 | 24.7 | 70.5 | 2,045 |
| Eksjö | 92.9 | 6.2 | 12,639 | 31.9 | 36.5 | 14.8 | 11.9 | 1.6 | 3.1 | 0.1 | 4,235 | 7,998 | 33.5 | 63.3 | 3,763 |
| Gislaved | 93.6 | 8.4 | 17,114 | 35.0 | 36.7 | 14.2 | 9.8 | 2.0 | 2.2 | 0.2 | 6,334 | 10,377 | 37.0 | 60.6 | 4,043 |
| Gnosjö | 95.5 | 2.6 | 5,328 | 28.7 | 34.8 | 16.6 | 11.7 | 1.7 | 6.4 | 0.1 | 1,618 | 3,365 | 30.4 | 63.2 | 1,747 |
| Jönköping | 93.1 | 35.9 | 72,769 | 40.5 | 23.4 | 16.7 | 12.5 | 3.0 | 3.7 | 0.2 | 31,628 | 38,243 | 43.5 | 52.6 | 6,615 |
| Nässjö | 93.0 | 11.2 | 22,660 | 41.1 | 28.6 | 12.7 | 11.9 | 2.9 | 2.4 | 0.3 | 9,985 | 12,067 | 44.1 | 53.3 | 2,082 |
| Sävsjö | 92.2 | 3.9 | 7,860 | 24.5 | 43.2 | 16.5 | 10.7 | 1.6 | 3.5 | 0.0 | 2,049 | 5,534 | 26.1 | 70.4 | 3,485 |
| Tranås | 92.4 | 6.3 | 12,778 | 41.0 | 25.6 | 15.5 | 11.7 | 2.3 | 3.7 | 0.2 | 5,532 | 6,748 | 43.3 | 52.8 | 1,216 |
| Vaggeryd | 94.6 | 3.8 | 7,775 | 34.4 | 32.3 | 14.8 | 9.1 | 3.1 | 6.1 | 0.1 | 2,919 | 4,370 | 37.5 | 56.2 | 1,451 |
| Vetlanda | 92.6 | 9.5 | 19,252 | 32.0 | 38.9 | 14.1 | 9.8 | 1.8 | 3.3 | 0.2 | 6,505 | 12,080 | 33.8 | 62.7 | 5,575 |
| Värnamo | 93.8 | 9.9 | 20,020 | 32.3 | 34.0 | 15.7 | 10.6 | 2.6 | 4.7 | 0.2 | 6,978 | 12,053 | 34.9 | 60.2 | 5,075 |
| Total | 93.2 | 3.7 | 202,653 | 36.4 | 30.4 | 15.4 | 11.5 | 2.5 | 3.6 | 0.2 | 78,882 | 115,979 | 38.9 | 57.2 | 37,097 |
Source: SCB

=== Kalmar ===
| Location | Turnout | Share | Votes | S | C | M | FP | VPK | KDS | Other | L-vote | R-vote | Left | Right | Margin |
| Location | % | % | | % | % | % | % | % | % | % | | | % | % | |
|---|---|---|---|---|---|---|---|---|---|---|---|---|---|---|---|
| Borgholm | 91.8 | 4.6 | 7,581 | 25.8 | 50.1 | 14.2 | 5.2 | 2.5 | 2.2 | 0.1 | 2,143 | 5,267 | 28.3 | 69.5 | 3,124 |
| Emmaboda | 93.7 | 4.7 | 7,746 | 45.8 | 34.7 | 10.5 | 4.3 | 2.6 | 1.7 | 0.4 | 3,752 | 3,831 | 48.4 | 49.5 | 79 |
| Hultsfred | 92.7 | 7.7 | 12,640 | 43.2 | 31.3 | 14.0 | 6.0 | 2.6 | 2.8 | 0.1 | 5,793 | 6,482 | 45.8 | 51.3 | 689 |
| Högsby | 93.4 | 3.4 | 5,640 | 44.3 | 31.2 | 13.4 | 4.8 | 3.2 | 3.0 | 0.0 | 2,681 | 2,786 | 47.5 | 49.4 | 105 |
| Kalmar | 91.9 | 22.0 | 36,272 | 44.2 | 23.1 | 18.9 | 9.1 | 3.3 | 1.2 | 0.3 | 17,225 | 18,495 | 47.5 | 51.0 | 1,270 |
| Mönsterås | 92.4 | 5.3 | 8,823 | 48.3 | 26.0 | 13.5 | 4.7 | 4.5 | 2.9 | 0.0 | 4,662 | 3,907 | 52.8 | 44.3 | 755 |
| Mörbylånga | 92.6 | 4.8 | 7,915 | 35.2 | 35.8 | 18.6 | 7.9 | 1.8 | 0.6 | 0.1 | 2,933 | 4,928 | 37.1 | 62.3 | 1,995 |
| Nybro | 93.1 | 9.0 | 14,805 | 45.3 | 30.9 | 12.7 | 5.3 | 3.8 | 2.0 | 0.1 | 7,265 | 7,234 | 49.1 | 48.9 | 31 |
| Oskarshamn | 92.3 | 11.4 | 18,746 | 49.2 | 22.3 | 13.4 | 8.8 | 3.3 | 2.6 | 0.2 | 9,852 | 8,354 | 52.6 | 44.6 | 1,498 |
| Torsås | 91.5 | 3.3 | 5,397 | 30.8 | 42.7 | 16.7 | 6.2 | 0.8 | 2.8 | 0.0 | 1,705 | 3,538 | 31.6 | 65.6 | 1,833 |
| Vimmerby | 93.3 | 6.8 | 11,234 | 34.1 | 42.9 | 14.8 | 4.7 | 2.1 | 1.4 | 0.1 | 4,067 | 7,007 | 36.2 | 62.4 | 2,940 |
| Västervik | 91.4 | 17.1 | 28,176 | 48.0 | 25.8 | 14.1 | 6.0 | 4.4 | 1.6 | 0.1 | 14,762 | 12,933 | 52.4 | 45.9 | 1,829 |
| Total | 92.3 | 3.0 | 164,975 | 43.3 | 29.6 | 15.1 | 6.7 | 3.2 | 1.9 | 0.1 | 76,840 | 84,762 | 46.6 | 51.4 | 7,922 |
Source: SCB

=== Kronoberg ===
| Location | Turnout | Share | Votes | S | C | M | FP | VPK | KDS | Other | L-vote | R-vote | Left | Right | Margin |
| Location | % | % | | % | % | % | % | % | % | % | | | % | % | |
|---|---|---|---|---|---|---|---|---|---|---|---|---|---|---|---|
| Alvesta | 92.5 | 11.0 | 12,431 | 36.2 | 37.6 | 14.4 | 7.0 | 2.6 | 1.6 | 0.6 | 4,830 | 7,338 | 38.9 | 59.0 | 2,508 |
| Lessebo | 95.0 | 5.4 | 6,083 | 55.0 | 23.2 | 9.1 | 5.1 | 6.6 | 1.1 | 0.0 | 3,745 | 2,271 | 61.6 | 37.3 | 1,474 |
| Ljungby | 92.0 | 15.3 | 17,397 | 33.0 | 39.9 | 14.8 | 7.3 | 2.6 | 2.1 | 0.3 | 6,197 | 10,785 | 35.5 | 62.0 | 4,588 |
| Markaryd | 92.2 | 6.7 | 7,623 | 40.5 | 34.6 | 11.9 | 7.1 | 3.1 | 2.6 | 0.3 | 3,318 | 4,088 | 43.5 | 53.6 | 770 |
| Tingsryd | 90.3 | 8.9 | 10,111 | 31.4 | 42.3 | 17.2 | 5.0 | 3.1 | 1.0 | 0.0 | 3,480 | 6,518 | 34.4 | 64.5 | 3,038 |
| Uppvidinge | 92.1 | 6.9 | 7,841 | 42.0 | 35.1 | 11.2 | 5.2 | 5.7 | 0.8 | 0.0 | 3,734 | 4,039 | 47.6 | 51.5 | 305 |
| Växjö | 92.2 | 36.6 | 41,514 | 36.8 | 30.5 | 17.7 | 9.9 | 3.7 | 1.1 | 0.3 | 16,826 | 24,087 | 40.3 | 58.0 | 7,261 |
| Älmhult | 92.8 | 9.2 | 10,411 | 40.6 | 32.6 | 16.6 | 5.7 | 2.8 | 1.5 | 0.2 | 4,520 | 5,717 | 43.4 | 54.9 | 1,197 |
| Total | 92.2 | 2.1 | 113,411 | 37.6 | 34.2 | 15.4 | 7.6 | 3.5 | 1.4 | 0.3 | 46,650 | 64,843 | 41.1 | 57.2 | 18,193 |
Source: SCB

=== Norrbotten ===
| Location | Turnout | Share | Votes | S | C | M | FP | VPK | KDS | Other | L-vote | R-vote | Left | Right | Margin |
| Location | % | % | | % | % | % | % | % | % | % | | | % | % | |
|---|---|---|---|---|---|---|---|---|---|---|---|---|---|---|---|
| Arjeplog | 87.4 | 1.6 | 2,751 | 48.2 | 20.9 | 4.5 | 6.5 | 17.1 | 2.1 | 0.5 | 1,797 | 880 | 65.3 | 32.0 | 917 |
| Arvidsjaur | 90.3 | 3.3 | 5,604 | 53.7 | 19.1 | 4.3 | 6.2 | 13.5 | 2.5 | 0.7 | 3,771 | 1,659 | 67.3 | 29.6 | 2,112 |
| Boden | 91.3 | 11.3 | 19,110 | 53.8 | 18.7 | 10.0 | 7.6 | 7.2 | 2.2 | 0.6 | 11,657 | 6,917 | 61.0 | 36.2 | 4,740 |
| Gällivare | 87.0 | 9.2 | 15,619 | 51.5 | 14.0 | 9.5 | 4.8 | 17.8 | 0.8 | 1.6 | 10,820 | 4,424 | 69.3 | 28.3 | 6,396 |
| Haparanda | 88.8 | 2.9 | 4,949 | 46.6 | 25.9 | 12.1 | 4.4 | 8.9 | 1.3 | 0.7 | 2,749 | 2,100 | 55.5 | 42.4 | 649 |
| Jokkmokk | 85.0 | 2.8 | 4,831 | 56.5 | 14.7 | 7.2 | 6.7 | 13.1 | 1.1 | 0.7 | 3,364 | 1,379 | 69.6 | 28.5 | 1,985 |
| Kalix | 93.7 | 7.4 | 12,606 | 62.0 | 17.8 | 7.2 | 4.0 | 7.2 | 1.1 | 0.7 | 8,714 | 3,662 | 69.1 | 29.0 | 5,052 |
| Kiruna | 85.1 | 10.1 | 17,083 | 56.8 | 12.2 | 6.5 | 7.0 | 15.8 | 1.1 | 0.5 | 12,409 | 4,399 | 72.6 | 25.8 | 8,010 |
| Luleå | 91.4 | 25.1 | 42,612 | 50.9 | 18.6 | 10.3 | 8.3 | 9.7 | 1.7 | 0.6 | 25,817 | 15,820 | 60.6 | 37.1 | 9,997 |
| Pajala | 88.7 | 3.5 | 5,978 | 46.7 | 17.1 | 8.2 | 2.8 | 22.7 | 2.1 | 0.4 | 4,151 | 1,678 | 69.4 | 28.1 | 2,473 |
| Piteå | 93.7 | 14.4 | 24,412 | 57.8 | 20.7 | 5.8 | 4.8 | 6.4 | 4.1 | 0.4 | 15,679 | 7,641 | 64.2 | 31.3 | 8,038 |
| Älvsbyn | 91.6 | 3.6 | 6,188 | 54.0 | 19.3 | 3.9 | 4.7 | 12.9 | 4.8 | 0.4 | 4,142 | 1,723 | 66.9 | 27.8 | 2,419 |
| Överkalix | 89.8 | 2.2 | 3,712 | 58.5 | 21.0 | 3.7 | 2.4 | 13.4 | 0.5 | 0.5 | 2,669 | 1,008 | 71.9 | 27.2 | 1,661 |
| Övertorneå | 91.1 | 2.5 | 4,186 | 44.3 | 29.7 | 8.1 | 2.6 | 13.5 | 1.2 | 0.5 | 2,418 | 1,691 | 57.8 | 40.4 | 727 |
| Total | 90.3 | 3.1 | 169,641 | 53.7 | 18.2 | 8.1 | 6.0 | 11.2 | 2.0 | 0.7 | 110,157 | 54,981 | 64.9 | 32.4 | 55,176 |
Source: SCB

=== Skåne ===
==== Kristianstad ====
| Location | Turnout | Share | Votes | S | C | M | FP | VPK | KDS | Other | L-vote | R-vote | Left | Right | Margin |
| Location | % | % | | % | % | % | % | % | % | % | | | % | % | |
|---|---|---|---|---|---|---|---|---|---|---|---|---|---|---|---|
| Bromölla | 93.1 | 4.0 | 7,272 | 61.3 | 16.2 | 8.5 | 7.9 | 4.5 | 1.2 | 0.4 | 4,782 | 2,374 | 65.8 | 32.6 | 2,408 |
| Båstad | 92.5 | 4.3 | 7,849 | 18.8 | 45.9 | 23.2 | 9.7 | 0.7 | 0.8 | 0.9 | 1,526 | 6,188 | 19.4 | 78.8 | 4,662 |
| Hässleholm | 91.5 | 17.7 | 32,319 | 34.7 | 34.6 | 15.5 | 11.3 | 1.8 | 1.9 | 0.2 | 11,793 | 19,827 | 36.5 | 61.3 | 8,034 |
| Klippan | 91.6 | 5.9 | 10,709 | 39.7 | 32.4 | 16.7 | 8.8 | 1.3 | 1.0 | 0.0 | 4,393 | 6,212 | 41.0 | 58.0 | 1,819 |
| Kristianstad | 91.7 | 25.2 | 46,177 | 44.0 | 23.5 | 16.7 | 12.3 | 2.0 | 1.2 | 0.2 | 21,231 | 24,274 | 46.0 | 52.6 | 3,043 |
| Osby | 91.9 | 5.1 | 9,347 | 41.4 | 34.3 | 10.7 | 8.5 | 2.9 | 2.0 | 0.2 | 4,136 | 5,006 | 44.2 | 53.6 | 870 |
| Perstorp | 91.8 | 2.5 | 4,564 | 42.7 | 29.0 | 14.9 | 9.6 | 1.9 | 1.6 | 0.1 | 2,037 | 2,446 | 44.6 | 53.6 | 409 |
| Simrishamn | 89.8 | 7.6 | 13,912 | 37.8 | 30.0 | 17.7 | 11.5 | 1.4 | 0.8 | 0.1 | 5,442 | 8,241 | 39.1 | 59.2 | 2,799 |
| Tomelilla | 89.5 | 4.8 | 8,700 | 32.3 | 37.5 | 17.5 | 10.5 | 0.9 | 0.9 | 0.4 | 2,891 | 5,693 | 33.2 | 65.4 | 2,802 |
| Åstorp | 92.5 | 4.0 | 7,282 | 47.8 | 26.0 | 15.1 | 8.9 | 1.4 | 0.8 | 0.1 | 3,577 | 3,640 | 49.1 | 50.0 | 63 |
| Ängelholm | 91.7 | 10.6 | 19,358 | 31.9 | 33.1 | 23.3 | 9.5 | 1.3 | 0.9 | 0.1 | 6,418 | 12,753 | 33.2 | 65.9 | 6,335 |
| Örkelljunga | 92.0 | 3.2 | 5,883 | 24.1 | 36.2 | 25.3 | 10.0 | 0.9 | 3.5 | 0.0 | 1,467 | 4,209 | 24.9 | 71.5 | 2,742 |
| Östra Göinge | 92.1 | 5.2 | 9,583 | 51.7 | 24.4 | 11.3 | 8.0 | 2.5 | 2.0 | 0.1 | 5,197 | 4,180 | 54.2 | 43.6 | 1,017 |
| Total | 91.6 | 100.0 | 182,955 | 39.1 | 30.1 | 16.8 | 10.5 | 1.8 | 1.4 | 0.3 | 74,890 | 105,043 | 40.9 | 57.4 | 30,153 |
Source: SCB

==== Fyrstadskretsen ====
| Location | Turnout | Share | Votes | S | C | M | FP | VPK | KDS | Other | L-vote | R-vote | Left | Right | Margin |
| Location | % | % | | % | % | % | % | % | % | % | | | % | % | |
|---|---|---|---|---|---|---|---|---|---|---|---|---|---|---|---|
| Helsingborg | 91.7 | 22.0 | 68,101 | 44.8 | 21.5 | 18.7 | 11.2 | 2.9 | 0.7 | 0.2 | 32,454 | 34,965 | 47.7 | 51.3 | 2,511 |
| Landskrona | 92.2 | 8.1 | 24,899 | 55.3 | 15.5 | 16.5 | 9.4 | 2.2 | 0.8 | 0.3 | 14,336 | 10,310 | 57.6 | 41.4 | 4,026 |
| Lund | 93.4 | 16.5 | 50,934 | 37.2 | 19.8 | 20.3 | 13.9 | 7.6 | 0.5 | 0.6 | 22,825 | 27,544 | 44.8 | 54.1 | 4,719 |
| Malmö | 91.5 | 53.4 | 165,093 | 47.6 | 13.9 | 22.7 | 11.7 | 3.2 | 0.5 | 0.4 | 83,844 | 79,679 | 50.8 | 48.3 | 4,165 |
| Total | 91.9 | 5.7 | 309,027 | 45.9 | 16.0 | 21.6 | 11.8 | 3.8 | 0.6 | 0.4 | 153,459 | 152,498 | 49.7 | 49.3 | 961 |
Source: SCB

==== Malmöhus ====
| Location | Turnout | Share | Votes | S | C | M | FP | VPK | KDS | Other | L-vote | R-vote | Left | Right | Margin |
| Location | % | % | | % | % | % | % | % | % | % | | | % | % | |
|---|---|---|---|---|---|---|---|---|---|---|---|---|---|---|---|
| Bjuv | 93.7 | 4.7 | 8,653 | 57.2 | 21.4 | 9.6 | 9.0 | 2.0 | 0.7 | 0.0 | 5,124 | 3,465 | 59.2 | 40.0 | 1,659 |
| Burlöv | 94.4 | 4.9 | 8,962 | 52.9 | 16.2 | 16.2 | 11.4 | 3.0 | 0.2 | 0.1 | 5,017 | 3,919 | 56.0 | 43.7 | 1,098 |
| Eslöv | 92.0 | 9.4 | 17,418 | 43.2 | 31.9 | 14.3 | 8.4 | 1.7 | 0.6 | 0.0 | 7,821 | 9,496 | 44.9 | 54.5 | 1,675 |
| Höganäs | 94.6 | 7.8 | 14,366 | 39.4 | 21.3 | 25.7 | 11.1 | 1.4 | 1.0 | 0.1 | 5,863 | 8,354 | 40.8 | 58.2 | 2,491 |
| Hörby | 91.5 | 4.5 | 8,262 | 24.8 | 44.7 | 13.6 | 14.0 | 1.1 | 1.9 | 0.0 | 2,136 | 5,971 | 25.8 | 72.3 | 3,835 |
| Höör | 91.7 | 3.7 | 6,913 | 28.1 | 37.4 | 19.2 | 12.7 | 1.4 | 1.1 | 0.0 | 2,039 | 4,789 | 29.5 | 69.3 | 2,750 |
| Kävlinge | 95.0 | 6.7 | 12,470 | 48.4 | 23.9 | 15.3 | 10.5 | 1.6 | 0.2 | 0.1 | 6,231 | 6,197 | 50.0 | 49.7 | 34 |
| Lomma | 96.0 | 5.3 | 9,738 | 37.4 | 22.4 | 25.1 | 13.2 | 1.7 | 0.2 | 0.0 | 3,806 | 5,905 | 39.1 | 60.6 | 2,099 |
| Sjöbo | 91.5 | 5.3 | 9,714 | 31.2 | 44.2 | 14.0 | 9.0 | 0.9 | 0.6 | 0.0 | 3,113 | 6,539 | 32.0 | 67.3 | 3,426 |
| Skurup | 93.2 | 4.3 | 8,033 | 38.2 | 38.2 | 13.1 | 9.0 | 0.8 | 0.7 | 0.1 | 3,135 | 4,835 | 39.0 | 60.2 | 1,700 |
| Staffanstorp | 95.8 | 5.3 | 9,712 | 37.0 | 24.8 | 22.1 | 14.0 | 1.6 | 0.4 | 0.1 | 3,749 | 5,920 | 38.6 | 61.0 | 2,171 |
| Svalöv | 93.5 | 4.5 | 8,381 | 40.8 | 36.6 | 13.3 | 7.2 | 1.3 | 0.8 | 0.0 | 3,527 | 4,787 | 42.1 | 57.1 | 1,260 |
| Svedala | 95.3 | 4.7 | 8,641 | 47.7 | 24.6 | 14.9 | 10.5 | 1.2 | 0.9 | 0.1 | 4,230 | 4,326 | 49.0 | 50.1 | 96 |
| Trelleborg | 92.7 | 12.3 | 22,779 | 52.8 | 21.2 | 13.8 | 9.8 | 1.5 | 0.8 | 0.0 | 12,373 | 10,203 | 54.3 | 44.8 | 2,170 |
| Vellinge | 95.9 | 7.5 | 13,847 | 29.6 | 20.2 | 33.8 | 15.0 | 1.0 | 0.3 | 0.1 | 4,239 | 9,550 | 30.6 | 69.0 | 5,311 |
| Ystad | 92.4 | 9.1 | 16,870 | 46.6 | 24.3 | 16.5 | 11.0 | 1.0 | 0.5 | 0.2 | 8,032 | 8,732 | 47.6 | 51.8 | 700 |
| Total | 93.6 | 3.4 | 184,759 | 42.1 | 27.1 | 17.8 | 10.9 | 1.4 | 0.7 | 0.1 | 80,435 | 102,988 | 43.5 | 55.7 | 22,553 |
Source: SCB

=== Stockholm area ===
==== Stockholm ====
| Location | Turnout | Share | Votes | S | C | M | FP | VPK | KDS | Other | L-vote | R-vote | Left | Right | Margin |
| Location | % | % | | % | % | % | % | % | % | % | | | % | % | |
|---|---|---|---|---|---|---|---|---|---|---|---|---|---|---|---|
| Stockholm | 90.3 | 100.0 | 471,070 | 38.1 | 13.3 | 24.8 | 13.3 | 8.8 | 0.8 | 0.9 | 221,252 | 242,010 | 47.0 | 51.4 | 20,758 |
| Total | 90.3 | 8.7 | 471,070 | 38.1 | 13.3 | 24.8 | 13.3 | 8.8 | 0.8 | 0.9 | 221,252 | 242,010 | 47.0 | 51.4 | 20,758 |
Source: SCB

==== Stockholm County ====
| Location | Turnout | Share | Votes | S | C | M | FP | VPK | KDS | Other | L-vote | R-vote | Left | Right | Margin |
| Location | % | % | | % | % | % | % | % | % | % | | | % | % | |
|---|---|---|---|---|---|---|---|---|---|---|---|---|---|---|---|
| Botkyrka | 91.3 | 7.2 | 35,835 | 42.8 | 18.5 | 17.0 | 14.1 | 6.5 | 0.7 | 0.5 | 17,642 | 17,755 | 49.2 | 49.5 | 113 |
| Danderyd | 95.7 | 3.7 | 18,306 | 18.1 | 15.6 | 47.9 | 14.3 | 3.4 | 0.3 | 0.4 | 3,929 | 14,251 | 21.5 | 77.8 | 10,322 |
| Ekerö | 95.0 | 1.8 | 9,079 | 30.3 | 24.2 | 25.2 | 14.2 | 5.3 | 0.6 | 0.2 | 3,237 | 5,770 | 35.7 | 63.6 | 2,533 |
| Haninge | 91.1 | 5.5 | 27,014 | 42.5 | 20.7 | 15.3 | 12.7 | 7.3 | 0.6 | 0.9 | 13,461 | 13,143 | 49.8 | 48.7 | 318 |
| Huddinge | 91.6 | 7.5 | 36,923 | 39.9 | 18.8 | 18.3 | 14.0 | 7.6 | 0.7 | 0.6 | 17,524 | 18,898 | 47.5 | 51.2 | 1,374 |
| Järfälla | 93.6 | 6.1 | 30,032 | 38.4 | 17.1 | 21.2 | 15.8 | 6.1 | 0.9 | 0.4 | 13,374 | 16,254 | 44.5 | 54.1 | 2,880 |
| Lidingö | 94.4 | 5.0 | 24,580 | 21.7 | 15.2 | 41.3 | 15.9 | 4.8 | 0.4 | 0.6 | 6,525 | 17,795 | 26.5 | 72.4 | 11,270 |
| Nacka | 93.0 | 6.7 | 33,249 | 33.7 | 15.5 | 28.0 | 14.3 | 7.3 | 0.5 | 0.8 | 13,635 | 19,186 | 41.0 | 57.7 | 5,551 |
| Norrtälje | 90.9 | 5.2 | 25,568 | 40.3 | 31.0 | 14.9 | 8.8 | 3.5 | 1.3 | 0.2 | 11,187 | 14,001 | 43.8 | 54.8 | 2,814 |
| Nynäshamn | 93.2 | 2.5 | 12,464 | 50.1 | 22.1 | 10.4 | 9.6 | 6.7 | 0.8 | 0.3 | 7,077 | 5,245 | 56.8 | 42.1 | 1,832 |
| Sigtuna | 91.5 | 3.0 | 14,925 | 40.0 | 24.8 | 17.7 | 11.4 | 5.2 | 0.4 | 0.6 | 6,738 | 8,039 | 45.1 | 53.9 | 1,301 |
| Sollentuna | 94.4 | 5.6 | 27,668 | 33.0 | 19.8 | 24.7 | 14.8 | 6.3 | 1.0 | 0.5 | 10,861 | 16,399 | 39.3 | 59.3 | 5,538 |
| Solna | 91.6 | 7.6 | 37,628 | 37.2 | 13.3 | 25.0 | 15.0 | 7.8 | 0.8 | 0.9 | 16,922 | 20,073 | 45.0 | 53.3 | 3,151 |
| Sundbyberg | 91.3 | 3.8 | 18,704 | 48.3 | 14.0 | 15.6 | 12.1 | 8.6 | 0.4 | 0.8 | 10,644 | 7,819 | 56.9 | 41.8 | 2,825 |
| Södertälje | 90.9 | 8.9 | 43,826 | 44.4 | 22.2 | 15.9 | 10.4 | 5.5 | 1.0 | 0.6 | 21,854 | 21,252 | 49.9 | 48.5 | 602 |
| Tyresö | 93.3 | 3.2 | 15,775 | 37.3 | 19.2 | 19.1 | 15.8 | 7.7 | 0.5 | 0.3 | 7,096 | 8,534 | 45.0 | 54.1 | 1,438 |
| Täby | 94.4 | 5.2 | 25,606 | 28.2 | 19.6 | 31.5 | 14.5 | 5.0 | 0.5 | 0.6 | 8,506 | 16,811 | 33.2 | 65.7 | 8,305 |
| Upplands-Bro | 93.0 | 1.7 | 8,312 | 43.1 | 20.5 | 17.3 | 12.3 | 6.1 | 0.6 | 0.2 | 4,090 | 4,155 | 49.2 | 50.0 | 65 |
| Upplands-Väsby | 92.4 | 3.2 | 15,635 | 41.4 | 20.1 | 17.1 | 13.8 | 6.5 | 0.6 | 0.5 | 7,487 | 7,970 | 47.9 | 51.0 | 483 |
| Vallentuna | 94.2 | 1.8 | 8,936 | 31.5 | 27.3 | 23.2 | 12.0 | 4.2 | 1.2 | 0.6 | 3,188 | 5,584 | 35.7 | 62.5 | 2,396 |
| Vaxholm | 93.5 | 3.2 | 16,064 | 33.1 | 22.4 | 24.3 | 14.0 | 5.4 | 0.5 | 0.3 | 6,177 | 9,756 | 38.5 | 60.7 | 3,579 |
| Värmdö | 92.6 | 1.8 | 9,078 | 42.7 | 20.4 | 19.4 | 10.7 | 5.8 | 0.7 | 0.3 | 4,407 | 4,581 | 48.5 | 50.5 | 174 |
| Total | 92.6 | 9.1 | 495,207 | 37.3 | 19.4 | 22.3 | 13.4 | 6.2 | 0.7 | 0.6 | 215,561 | 273,271 | 43.5 | 55.2 | 57,710 |
Source: SCB

=== Södermanland ===
| Location | Turnout | Share | Votes | S | C | M | FP | VPK | KDS | Other | L-vote | R-vote | Left | Right | Margin |
| Location | % | % | | % | % | % | % | % | % | % | | | % | % | |
|---|---|---|---|---|---|---|---|---|---|---|---|---|---|---|---|
| Eskilstuna | 92.2 | 35.2 | 57,466 | 51.8 | 18.5 | 12.1 | 12.6 | 3.4 | 1.3 | 0.4 | 31,711 | 24,828 | 55.2 | 43.2 | 6,883 |
| Flen | 93.1 | 7.1 | 11,658 | 49.2 | 26.9 | 11.3 | 8.1 | 2.8 | 1.6 | 0.1 | 6,062 | 5,393 | 52.0 | 46.3 | 669 |
| Katrineholm | 93.0 | 13.5 | 22,037 | 51.1 | 24.2 | 11.4 | 9.2 | 2.0 | 1.8 | 0.3 | 11,707 | 9,872 | 53.1 | 44.8 | 1,835 |
| Nyköping | 93.3 | 25.8 | 42,083 | 47.5 | 24.5 | 13.9 | 9.3 | 2.9 | 1.5 | 0.3 | 21,210 | 20,090 | 50.4 | 47.7 | 1,120 |
| Oxelösund | 93.1 | 5.2 | 8,480 | 61.4 | 14.4 | 8.1 | 8.6 | 6.4 | 0.7 | 0.4 | 5,749 | 2,635 | 67.8 | 31.1 | 3,114 |
| Strängnäs | 93.1 | 9.2 | 14,931 | 41.4 | 24.1 | 16.8 | 13.6 | 2.7 | 0.9 | 0.3 | 6,588 | 8,156 | 44.1 | 54.6 | 1,568 |
| Vingåker | 93.5 | 4.0 | 6,492 | 46.8 | 28.6 | 9.4 | 10.3 | 2.6 | 2.2 | 0.1 | 3,209 | 3,136 | 49.4 | 48.3 | 73 |
| Total | 92.8 | 3.0 | 163,147 | 49.8 | 22.1 | 12.5 | 10.8 | 3.1 | 1.4 | 0.3 | 86,236 | 74,110 | 52.9 | 45.4 | 12,126 |
Source: SCB

=== Uppsala ===
| Location | Turnout | Share | Votes | S | C | M | FP | VPK | KDS | Other | L-vote | R-vote | Left | Right | Margin |
| Location | % | % | | % | % | % | % | % | % | % | | | % | % | |
|---|---|---|---|---|---|---|---|---|---|---|---|---|---|---|---|
| Enköping | 90.7 | 13.5 | 20,160 | 41.2 | 32.6 | 14.3 | 8.1 | 2.6 | 1.1 | 0.1 | 8,835 | 11,073 | 43.8 | 54.9 | 2,238 |
| Håbo | 92.7 | 3.6 | 5,444 | 40.0 | 25.8 | 18.0 | 11.7 | 3.7 | 0.6 | 0.1 | 2,381 | 3,021 | 43.7 | 55.5 | 640 |
| Tierp | 92.9 | 9.6 | 14,355 | 52.8 | 27.2 | 7.1 | 8.7 | 2.0 | 2.1 | 0.1 | 7,871 | 6,174 | 54.8 | 43.0 | 1,697 |
| Uppsala | 91.0 | 60.4 | 90,209 | 38.1 | 23.0 | 16.5 | 13.4 | 7.0 | 1.2 | 0.8 | 40,658 | 47,719 | 45.1 | 52.9 | 7,061 |
| Älvkarleby | 94.0 | 4.5 | 6,727 | 71.6 | 13.1 | 4.8 | 5.8 | 4.0 | 0.6 | 0.1 | 5,085 | 1,596 | 75.6 | 23.7 | 3,489 |
| Östhammar | 90.8 | 8.3 | 12,430 | 46.6 | 31.2 | 10.4 | 6.9 | 3.4 | 1.4 | 0.1 | 6,224 | 6,023 | 50.1 | 48.5 | 201 |
| Total | 91.3 | 3.0 | 149,325 | 42.2 | 25.1 | 14.3 | 11.3 | 5.4 | 1.2 | 0.6 | 71,054 | 75,606 | 47.6 | 50.6 | 4,552 |
Source: SCB

=== Värmland ===
| Location | Turnout | Share | Votes | S | C | M | FP | VPK | KDS | Other | L-vote | R-vote | Left | Right | Margin |
| Location | % | % | | % | % | % | % | % | % | % | | | % | % | |
|---|---|---|---|---|---|---|---|---|---|---|---|---|---|---|---|
| Arvika | 90.4 | 9.7 | 18,963 | 42.4 | 28.8 | 12.1 | 11.4 | 4.5 | 0.6 | 0.3 | 8,880 | 9,918 | 46.8 | 52.3 | 1,038 |
| Eda | 92.1 | 3.3 | 6,526 | 49.3 | 30.7 | 9.9 | 6.8 | 2.5 | 0.7 | 0.1 | 3,376 | 3,096 | 51.7 | 47.4 | 280 |
| Filipstad | 92.4 | 5.5 | 10,695 | 59.1 | 17.4 | 9.3 | 8.0 | 5.3 | 0.6 | 0.2 | 6,889 | 3,717 | 64.4 | 34.8 | 3,172 |
| Forshaga | 94.4 | 3.9 | 7,574 | 55.7 | 23.8 | 8.6 | 8.1 | 2.9 | 0.8 | 0.1 | 4,434 | 3,069 | 58.5 | 40.5 | 1,365 |
| Grums | 92.2 | 3.7 | 7,231 | 55.0 | 24.6 | 7.9 | 7.3 | 4.2 | 0.8 | 0.2 | 4,282 | 2,877 | 59.2 | 39.8 | 1,405 |
| Hagfors | 93.9 | 6.7 | 13,178 | 60.4 | 20.4 | 7.0 | 4.5 | 6.7 | 0.7 | 0.2 | 8,838 | 4,205 | 67.1 | 31.9 | 4,633 |
| Hammarö | 94.0 | 3.8 | 7,400 | 57.4 | 16.9 | 11.2 | 9.2 | 4.4 | 0.3 | 0.6 | 4,569 | 2,765 | 61.7 | 37.4 | 1,804 |
| Karlstad | 92.6 | 25.6 | 50,261 | 41.8 | 22.6 | 18.8 | 12.1 | 3.8 | 0.5 | 0.4 | 22,960 | 26,875 | 45.7 | 53.5 | 3,915 |
| Kil | 93.8 | 3.4 | 6,647 | 37.7 | 29.2 | 14.2 | 15.9 | 2.0 | 0.5 | 0.4 | 2,644 | 3,940 | 39.8 | 59.3 | 1,296 |
| Kristinehamn | 92.5 | 9.7 | 18,977 | 47.7 | 22.7 | 13.1 | 10.9 | 4.2 | 1.2 | 0.1 | 9,857 | 8,869 | 51.9 | 46.7 | 988 |
| Munkfors | 94.4 | 2.0 | 3,978 | 67.1 | 15.8 | 5.7 | 7.0 | 3.6 | 0.6 | 0.1 | 2,815 | 1,136 | 70.8 | 28.6 | 1,679 |
| Storfors | 95.1 | 1.8 | 3,566 | 58.9 | 19.5 | 10.1 | 6.6 | 3.3 | 1.3 | 0.2 | 2,219 | 1,291 | 62.2 | 36.2 | 928 |
| Sunne | 92.2 | 5.0 | 9,894 | 32.2 | 42.2 | 15.0 | 8.5 | 1.3 | 0.5 | 0.2 | 3,310 | 6,512 | 33.5 | 65.8 | 3,202 |
| Säffle | 91.2 | 6.8 | 13,414 | 37.9 | 35.7 | 13.1 | 9.5 | 2.5 | 1.1 | 0.1 | 5,416 | 7,833 | 40.4 | 58.4 | 2,417 |
| Torsby | 90.7 | 5.8 | 11,376 | 44.9 | 28.5 | 11.7 | 6.2 | 7.7 | 0.7 | 0.3 | 5,982 | 5,276 | 52.6 | 46.4 | 706 |
| Årjäng | 86.2 | 3.3 | 6,503 | 27.7 | 40.9 | 14.9 | 12.7 | 1.1 | 2.6 | 0.1 | 1,875 | 4,455 | 28.8 | 68.5 | 2,580 |
| Total | 92.2 | 3.6 | 196,183 | 46.1 | 25.8 | 13.2 | 9.8 | 4.0 | 0.7 | 0.3 | 98,346 | 95,834 | 50.1 | 48.8 | 2,512 |
Source: SCB

=== Västerbotten ===
| Location | Turnout | Share | Votes | S | C | M | FP | VPK | KDS | Other | L-vote | R-vote | Left | Right | Margin |
| Location | % | % | | % | % | % | % | % | % | % | | | % | % | |
|---|---|---|---|---|---|---|---|---|---|---|---|---|---|---|---|
| Lycksele | 91.0 | 6.2 | 9,826 | 46.9 | 19.1 | 7.1 | 15.7 | 3.9 | 7.1 | 0.3 | 4,992 | 4,112 | 50.8 | 41.8 | 880 |
| Nordmaling | 92.5 | 3.4 | 5,452 | 43.6 | 31.8 | 9.8 | 9.2 | 2.1 | 3.5 | 0.0 | 2,493 | 2,769 | 45.7 | 50.8 | 276 |
| Norsjö | 88.3 | 4.2 | 6,715 | 48.2 | 23.6 | 6.1 | 13.8 | 5.2 | 3.0 | 0.1 | 3,583 | 2,919 | 53.4 | 43.5 | 664 |
| Robertsfors | 92.3 | 3.3 | 5,231 | 33.4 | 40.8 | 7.8 | 12.6 | 1.7 | 3.1 | 0.6 | 1,834 | 3,204 | 35.1 | 61.3 | 1,370 |
| Skellefteå | 90.7 | 30.8 | 49,133 | 49.8 | 24.8 | 8.8 | 9.7 | 3.4 | 3.1 | 0.5 | 26,151 | 21,254 | 53.2 | 43.3 | 4,897 |
| Sorsele | 87.7 | 1.7 | 2,718 | 41.1 | 25.5 | 5.4 | 15.1 | 4.7 | 8.0 | 0.1 | 1,246 | 1,252 | 45.8 | 46.1 | 6 |
| Storuman | 87.2 | 3.4 | 5,439 | 39.8 | 24.7 | 10.1 | 15.9 | 2.7 | 6.5 | 0.1 | 2,314 | 2,761 | 42.5 | 50.8 | 447 |
| Umeå | 91.8 | 31.4 | 49,986 | 42.4 | 26.9 | 10.0 | 11.8 | 5.7 | 2.1 | 1.1 | 24,031 | 24,363 | 48.1 | 48.7 | 332 |
| Vilhelmina | 90.7 | 3.7 | 5,971 | 50.6 | 24.4 | 4.7 | 11.3 | 3.9 | 4.9 | 0.3 | 3,254 | 2,412 | 54.5 | 40.4 | 842 |
| Vindeln | 90.7 | 3.1 | 4,996 | 35.3 | 32.7 | 10.4 | 15.5 | 1.9 | 4.0 | 0.1 | 1,861 | 2,930 | 37.2 | 58.6 | 1,069 |
| Vännäs | 90.8 | 4.8 | 7,669 | 40.1 | 31.2 | 10.4 | 12.2 | 2.9 | 3.1 | 0.2 | 3,296 | 4,124 | 43.0 | 53.8 | 828 |
| Åsele | 90.9 | 4.0 | 6,299 | 54.1 | 24.7 | 4.6 | 11.4 | 3.3 | 1.9 | 0.1 | 3,609 | 2,560 | 57.3 | 40.6 | 1,049 |
| Total | 90.9 | 2.9 | 159,435 | 45.3 | 26.3 | 8.8 | 11.7 | 4.1 | 3.3 | 0.6 | 78,766 | 74,660 | 49.3 | 46.8 | 4,006 |
Source: SCB

=== Västernorrland ===
| Location | Turnout | Share | Votes | S | C | M | FP | VPK | KDS | Other | L-vote | R-vote | Left | Right | Margin |
| Location | % | % | | % | % | % | % | % | % | % | | | % | % | |
|---|---|---|---|---|---|---|---|---|---|---|---|---|---|---|---|
| Härnösand | 92.8 | 10.3 | 19,137 | 42.0 | 34.1 | 11.0 | 6.5 | 4.7 | 1.4 | 0.3 | 8,935 | 9,881 | 46.7 | 51.6 | 946 |
| Kramfors | 94.1 | 11.0 | 20,546 | 54.2 | 28.9 | 5.4 | 3.0 | 6.9 | 1.4 | 0.1 | 12,570 | 7,656 | 61.2 | 37.3 | 4,914 |
| Sollefteå | 93.6 | 10.2 | 19,108 | 55.8 | 27.3 | 7.1 | 2.9 | 5.2 | 1.5 | 0.2 | 11,649 | 7,129 | 61.0 | 37.3 | 4,520 |
| Sundsvall | 91.7 | 34.0 | 63,430 | 49.3 | 26.0 | 8.7 | 8.9 | 5.3 | 1.2 | 0.5 | 34,667 | 27,658 | 54.7 | 43.6 | 7,009 |
| Timrå | 93.0 | 6.7 | 12,414 | 57.8 | 25.2 | 4.1 | 4.9 | 6.1 | 1.7 | 0.1 | 7,935 | 4,247 | 63.9 | 34.2 | 3,688 |
| Ånge | 91.6 | 5.3 | 9,950 | 52.0 | 31.6 | 4.5 | 4.3 | 6.0 | 1.5 | 0.1 | 5,773 | 4,021 | 58.0 | 40.4 | 1,752 |
| Örnsköldsvik | 93.0 | 22.5 | 41,913 | 48.8 | 30.1 | 6.0 | 8.5 | 3.2 | 3.1 | 0.3 | 21,765 | 18,703 | 51.9 | 44.6 | 3,062 |
| Total | 92.7 | 3.4 | 186,498 | 50.4 | 28.4 | 7.3 | 6.8 | 5.0 | 1.8 | 0.3 | 103,294 | 79,295 | 55.4 | 42.5 | 23,999 |
Source: SCB

=== Västmanland ===
| Location | Turnout | Share | Votes | S | C | M | FP | VPK | KDS | Other | L-vote | R-vote | Left | Right | Margin |
| Location | % | % | | % | % | % | % | % | % | % | | | % | % | |
|---|---|---|---|---|---|---|---|---|---|---|---|---|---|---|---|
| Arboga | 92.9 | 6.0 | 9,789 | 49.9 | 23.6 | 11.4 | 10.4 | 3.4 | 1.1 | 0.1 | 5,219 | 4,448 | 53.3 | 45.4 | 771 |
| Fagersta | 92.7 | 6.1 | 9,994 | 62.0 | 15.6 | 8.5 | 8.3 | 4.6 | 0.6 | 0.3 | 6,662 | 3,239 | 66.7 | 32.4 | 3,423 |
| Hallstahammar | 92.3 | 6.6 | 10,852 | 59.4 | 16.5 | 8.8 | 8.5 | 5.2 | 1.2 | 0.4 | 7,007 | 3,671 | 64.6 | 33.8 | 3,336 |
| Heby | 90.5 | 5.4 | 8,762 | 42.1 | 38.3 | 6.6 | 7.7 | 3.8 | 1.2 | 0.2 | 4,027 | 4,612 | 46.0 | 52.6 | 585 |
| Kungsör | 93.2 | 3.3 | 5,325 | 47.1 | 25.9 | 9.1 | 12.2 | 4.4 | 1.0 | 0.3 | 2,741 | 2,514 | 51.5 | 47.2 | 227 |
| Köping | 91.7 | 10.3 | 16,913 | 53.5 | 23.1 | 8.8 | 8.2 | 4.0 | 1.8 | 0.5 | 9,727 | 6,793 | 57.5 | 40.2 | 2,934 |
| Norberg | 92.3 | 2.7 | 4,438 | 61.0 | 18.7 | 7.9 | 5.5 | 5.9 | 0.8 | 0.2 | 2,968 | 1,425 | 66.9 | 32.1 | 1,543 |
| Sala | 92.5 | 8.6 | 13,996 | 39.6 | 34.8 | 10.9 | 10.4 | 2.7 | 1.3 | 0.2 | 5,920 | 7,862 | 42.3 | 56.2 | 1,942 |
| Skinnskatteberg | 92.4 | 2.0 | 3,347 | 61.5 | 21.0 | 6.4 | 4.9 | 4.6 | 1.3 | 0.4 | 2,211 | 1,081 | 66.1 | 32.3 | 1,130 |
| Surahammar | 94.4 | 3.9 | 6,421 | 65.1 | 14.1 | 6.6 | 7.0 | 6.0 | 0.8 | 0.5 | 4,566 | 1,773 | 71.1 | 27.6 | 2,793 |
| Västerås | 90.9 | 45.1 | 73,771 | 47.4 | 17.3 | 14.8 | 14.3 | 4.5 | 1.2 | 0.5 | 38,307 | 34,190 | 51.9 | 46.3 | 4,117 |
| Total | 91.7 | 3.0 | 163,608 | 50.3 | 21.0 | 11.6 | 11.2 | 4.3 | 1.2 | 0.4 | 89,355 | 71,608 | 54.6 | 43.8 | 17,747 |
Source: SCB

=== Västra Götaland ===
==== Bohuslän ====
| Location | Turnout | Share | Votes | S | C | M | FP | VPK | KDS | Other | L-vote | R-vote | Left | Right | Margin |
| Location | % | % | | % | % | % | % | % | % | % | | | % | % | |
|---|---|---|---|---|---|---|---|---|---|---|---|---|---|---|---|
| Härryda | 93.4 | 7.2 | 12,624 | 34.2 | 25.9 | 16.7 | 18.2 | 4.3 | 0.6 | 0.2 | 4,861 | 7,667 | 38.5 | 60.7 | 2,806 |
| Kungälv | 93.0 | 10.2 | 17,927 | 36.0 | 28.4 | 16.7 | 14.6 | 3.4 | 0.9 | 0.0 | 7,061 | 10,695 | 39.4 | 59.7 | 3,634 |
| Lysekil | 92.3 | 5.9 | 10,259 | 52.0 | 17.6 | 12.7 | 14.0 | 3.1 | 0.5 | 0.0 | 5,649 | 4,555 | 55.1 | 44.4 | 1,094 |
| Munkedal | 91.7 | 4.0 | 6,982 | 36.8 | 37.0 | 13.0 | 10.0 | 2.1 | 1.1 | 0.0 | 2,714 | 4,189 | 38.9 | 60.0 | 1,475 |
| Mölndal | 92.4 | 17.2 | 30,053 | 39.1 | 20.7 | 15.2 | 17.7 | 6.1 | 1.0 | 0.2 | 13,577 | 16,127 | 45.2 | 53.7 | 2,550 |
| Orust | 88.9 | 4.0 | 7,019 | 29.7 | 38.7 | 14.3 | 15.4 | 1.7 | 0.2 | 0.0 | 2,202 | 4,801 | 31.4 | 68.4 | 2,599 |
| Partille | 93.1 | 9.8 | 17,078 | 35.8 | 19.1 | 18.5 | 19.8 | 5.7 | 1.0 | 0.0 | 7,090 | 9,797 | 41.5 | 57.4 | 2,707 |
| Sotenäs | 91.2 | 3.7 | 6,522 | 44.6 | 20.8 | 14.7 | 16.6 | 2.0 | 1.2 | 0.0 | 3,044 | 3,399 | 46.7 | 52.1 | 355 |
| Stenungsund | 92.0 | 5.1 | 8,865 | 35.5 | 29.2 | 15.6 | 16.3 | 3.0 | 0.4 | 0.0 | 3,410 | 5,419 | 38.5 | 61.1 | 2,009 |
| Strömstad | 88.7 | 3.6 | 6,353 | 41.7 | 29.1 | 12.8 | 13.1 | 1.8 | 1.4 | 0.0 | 2,769 | 3,491 | 43.6 | 55.0 | 722 |
| Tanum | 89.1 | 4.3 | 7,546 | 24.8 | 41.2 | 17.1 | 15.1 | 1.3 | 0.5 | 0.0 | 1,970 | 5,540 | 26.1 | 73.4 | 3,570 |
| Tjörn | 89.7 | 3.9 | 6,861 | 21.4 | 27.1 | 19.3 | 27.2 | 1.4 | 3.5 | 0.0 | 1,570 | 5,049 | 22.9 | 73.6 | 3,479 |
| Uddevalla | 91.0 | 17.8 | 31,077 | 44.1 | 26.5 | 12.7 | 12.4 | 3.5 | 0.5 | 0.2 | 14,816 | 16,039 | 47.7 | 51.6 | 1,223 |
| Öckerö | 91.5 | 3.4 | 5,903 | 24.5 | 20.2 | 23.6 | 23.8 | 1.8 | 6.1 | 0.0 | 1,549 | 3,990 | 26.2 | 67.6 | 2,441 |
| Total | 91.7 | 3.2 | 175,069 | 37.6 | 25.8 | 15.5 | 16.3 | 3.7 | 1.1 | 0.1 | 72,282 | 100,758 | 41.3 | 57.6 | 28,476 |
Source: SCB

==== Gothenburg ====
| Location | Turnout | Share | Votes | S | C | M | FP | VPK | KDS | Other | L-vote | R-vote | Left | Right | Margin |
| Location | % | % | | % | % | % | % | % | % | % | | | % | % | |
|---|---|---|---|---|---|---|---|---|---|---|---|---|---|---|---|
| Gothenburg | 90.1 | 100.0 | 290,365 | 38.9 | 15.9 | 17.5 | 18.2 | 8.1 | 0.9 | 0.6 | 136,398 | 149,581 | 47.0 | 51.5 | 13,183 |
| Total | 90.1 | 5.3 | 290,365 | 38.9 | 15.9 | 17.5 | 18.2 | 8.1 | 0.9 | 0.6 | 136,398 | 149,581 | 47.0 | 51.5 | 13,183 |
Source: SCB

==== Skaraborg ====
| Location | Turnout | Share | Votes | S | C | M | FP | VPK | KDS | Other | L-vote | R-vote | Left | Right | Margin |
| Location | % | % | | % | % | % | % | % | % | % | | | % | % | |
|---|---|---|---|---|---|---|---|---|---|---|---|---|---|---|---|
| Falköping | 92.5 | 12.9 | 22,711 | 30.5 | 40.5 | 15.5 | 9.2 | 2.1 | 2.1 | 0.1 | 7,394 | 14,803 | 32.6 | 65.2 | 7,409 |
| Grästorp | 91.9 | 2.1 | 3,710 | 22.0 | 46.6 | 18.9 | 10.4 | 1.2 | 0.9 | 0.1 | 861 | 2,814 | 23.2 | 75.8 | 1,953 |
| Gullspång | 90.6 | 2.6 | 4,544 | 39.3 | 36.6 | 12.4 | 7.5 | 1.8 | 2.2 | 0.1 | 1,868 | 2,571 | 41.1 | 56.6 | 703 |
| Götene | 91.8 | 4.7 | 8,238 | 36.0 | 32.7 | 13.5 | 12.2 | 2.3 | 3.2 | 0.0 | 3,158 | 4,812 | 38.3 | 58.4 | 1,654 |
| Habo | 93.6 | 2.5 | 4,344 | 28.4 | 34.0 | 17.2 | 14.1 | 1.4 | 4.9 | 0.0 | 1,295 | 2,835 | 29.8 | 65.3 | 1,540 |
| Hjo | 91.9 | 3.0 | 5,329 | 36.5 | 30.3 | 18.4 | 8.8 | 2.0 | 3.9 | 0.1 | 2,054 | 3,062 | 38.5 | 57.5 | 1,008 |
| Karlsborg | 94.2 | 3.3 | 5,787 | 43.8 | 30.9 | 12.6 | 9.4 | 1.2 | 2.0 | 0.1 | 2,606 | 3,061 | 45.0 | 52.9 | 455 |
| Lidköping | 90.7 | 13.2 | 23,206 | 38.6 | 29.4 | 13.9 | 12.0 | 4.2 | 1.6 | 0.2 | 9,929 | 12,853 | 42.8 | 55.4 | 2,924 |
| Mariestad | 91.4 | 8.9 | 15,624 | 39.3 | 28.7 | 15.2 | 11.0 | 2.8 | 2.4 | 0.5 | 6,580 | 8,588 | 42.1 | 55.0 | 2,008 |
| Mullsjö | 94.7 | 1.9 | 3,383 | 27.0 | 37.7 | 15.4 | 13.1 | 1.3 | 5.5 | 0.0 | 958 | 2,240 | 28.3 | 66.2 | 1,282 |
| Skara | 92.3 | 6.7 | 11,728 | 35.4 | 32.6 | 16.9 | 11.4 | 2.4 | 1.3 | 0.1 | 4,431 | 7,132 | 37.8 | 60.8 | 2,701 |
| Skövde | 91.1 | 16.2 | 28,509 | 37.3 | 30.2 | 14.4 | 12.5 | 3.2 | 2.0 | 0.4 | 11,549 | 16,280 | 40.5 | 57.1 | 4,731 |
| Tibro | 91.4 | 4.0 | 7,031 | 37.0 | 33.4 | 11.3 | 12.2 | 2.8 | 3.1 | 0.1 | 2,799 | 4,002 | 39.8 | 56.9 | 1,203 |
| Tidaholm | 93.3 | 5.1 | 9,003 | 43.4 | 33.0 | 10.3 | 7.8 | 3.0 | 2.3 | 0.2 | 4,184 | 4,597 | 46.5 | 51.1 | 413 |
| Töreboda | 90.8 | 4.0 | 6,946 | 33.3 | 41.3 | 14.9 | 7.2 | 1.8 | 1.3 | 0.2 | 2,434 | 4,408 | 35.0 | 63.5 | 1,974 |
| Vara | 92.2 | 8.9 | 15,641 | 20.7 | 45.0 | 22.5 | 9.4 | 1.3 | 1.1 | 0.0 | 3,442 | 12,021 | 22.0 | 76.9 | 8,579 |
| Total | 91.8 | 3.2 | 175,734 | 34.8 | 34.4 | 15.3 | 10.7 | 2.5 | 2.1 | 0.2 | 65,542 | 106,079 | 37.3 | 60.4 | 40,537 |
Source: SCB

==== Älvsborg N ====
| Location | Turnout | Share | Votes | S | C | M | FP | VPK | KDS | Other | L-vote | R-vote | Left | Right | Margin |
| Location | % | % | | % | % | % | % | % | % | % | | | % | % | |
|---|---|---|---|---|---|---|---|---|---|---|---|---|---|---|---|
| Ale | 93.3 | 8.3 | 12,869 | 44.5 | 28.4 | 9.9 | 11.5 | 4.1 | 1.5 | 0.0 | 6,257 | 6,408 | 48.6 | 49.8 | 151 |
| Alingsås | 92.3 | 12.0 | 18,632 | 34.7 | 28.9 | 15.0 | 16.4 | 2.8 | 2.0 | 0.0 | 7,000 | 11,241 | 37.6 | 60.3 | 4,241 |
| Bengtsfors | 91.6 | 5.5 | 8,496 | 42.5 | 35.0 | 9.5 | 9.0 | 2.0 | 1.9 | 0.1 | 3,784 | 4,540 | 44.5 | 53.4 | 756 |
| Dals-Ed | 90.4 | 2.2 | 3,473 | 24.0 | 52.4 | 11.1 | 8.1 | 1.4 | 3.1 | 0.0 | 881 | 2,485 | 25.4 | 71.6 | 1,604 |
| Färgelanda | 92.0 | 3.0 | 4,657 | 31.9 | 47.6 | 12.6 | 5.6 | 1.4 | 0.8 | 0.0 | 1,552 | 3,065 | 33.3 | 65.8 | 1,513 |
| Herrljunga | 94.0 | 4.0 | 6,250 | 24.5 | 41.0 | 19.5 | 12.1 | 1.6 | 1.3 | 0.0 | 1,633 | 4,535 | 26.1 | 72.6 | 2,902 |
| Lerum | 94.8 | 11.0 | 17,101 | 30.0 | 26.5 | 19.3 | 18.9 | 4.1 | 1.0 | 0.2 | 5,835 | 11,066 | 34.1 | 64.7 | 5,231 |
| Lilla Edet | 92.3 | 4.4 | 6,794 | 48.1 | 30.1 | 8.9 | 8.5 | 3.2 | 1.0 | 0.1 | 3,486 | 3,231 | 51.3 | 47.6 | 255 |
| Mellerud | 92.8 | 4.8 | 7,408 | 30.1 | 44.2 | 14.7 | 7.4 | 1.4 | 2.2 | 0.0 | 2,333 | 4,909 | 31.5 | 66.3 | 2,576 |
| Trollhättan | 91.2 | 20.2 | 31,409 | 50.8 | 21.3 | 9.9 | 12.7 | 3.9 | 1.1 | 0.1 | 17,190 | 13,816 | 54.7 | 44.0 | 3,374 |
| Vårgårda | 92.8 | 3.7 | 5,734 | 22.8 | 41.0 | 18.0 | 15.3 | 1.2 | 1.8 | 0.0 | 1,372 | 4,258 | 23.9 | 74.3 | 2,886 |
| Vänersborg | 91.8 | 15.0 | 23,355 | 40.4 | 29.6 | 13.4 | 12.1 | 3.0 | 1.3 | 0.1 | 10,137 | 12,881 | 43.4 | 55.2 | 2,744 |
| Åmål | 90.8 | 5.9 | 9,165 | 44.0 | 29.8 | 13.9 | 9.1 | 1.8 | 1.3 | 0.2 | 4,196 | 4,838 | 45.8 | 52.8 | 642 |
| Total | 92.3 | 2.9 | 155,343 | 39.3 | 30.4 | 13.3 | 12.6 | 3.0 | 1.4 | 0.1 | 65,656 | 87,273 | 42.3 | 56.2 | 21,617 |
Source: SCB

==== Älvsborg S ====
| Location | Turnout | Share | Votes | S | C | M | FP | VPK | KDS | Other | L-vote | R-vote | Left | Right | Margin |
| Location | % | % | | % | % | % | % | % | % | % | | | % | % | |
|---|---|---|---|---|---|---|---|---|---|---|---|---|---|---|---|
| Borås | 93.1 | 57.4 | 68,107 | 41.5 | 23.0 | 19.9 | 10.6 | 3.6 | 1.2 | 0.2 | 30,705 | 36,464 | 45.1 | 53.5 | 5,759 |
| Mark | 94.4 | 17.4 | 20,588 | 43.0 | 31.1 | 16.0 | 5.7 | 3.1 | 1.0 | 0.0 | 9,505 | 10,877 | 46.2 | 52.8 | 1,372 |
| Svenljunga | 93.7 | 5.9 | 7,028 | 31.1 | 40.0 | 20.0 | 6.7 | 0.9 | 1.3 | 0.0 | 2,252 | 4,684 | 32.0 | 66.6 | 2,432 |
| Tranemo | 95.0 | 6.6 | 7,828 | 36.7 | 37.8 | 14.8 | 8.3 | 1.3 | 1.1 | 0.0 | 2,976 | 4,767 | 38.0 | 60.9 | 1,791 |
| Ulricehamn | 93.9 | 12.7 | 15,036 | 26.5 | 39.1 | 20.1 | 11.2 | 1.3 | 1.7 | 0.1 | 4,180 | 10,583 | 27.8 | 70.4 | 6,403 |
| Total | 93.6 | 2.2 | 118,587 | 38.9 | 28.4 | 18.9 | 9.4 | 2.9 | 1.2 | 0.1 | 49,618 | 67,375 | 41.8 | 56.8 | 17,757 |
Source: SCB

=== Örebro ===
| Location | Turnout | Share | Votes | S | C | M | FP | VPK | KDS | Other | L-vote | R-vote | Left | Right | Margin |
| Location | % | % | | % | % | % | % | % | % | % | | | % | % | |
|---|---|---|---|---|---|---|---|---|---|---|---|---|---|---|---|
| Askersund | 91.2 | 4.2 | 7,787 | 46.5 | 31.2 | 10.1 | 7.3 | 2.2 | 2.7 | 0.1 | 3,788 | 3,781 | 48.6 | 48.6 | 7 |
| Degerfors | 95.0 | 4.3 | 8,034 | 61.9 | 19.3 | 5.9 | 5.9 | 4.7 | 2.1 | 0.2 | 5,356 | 2,494 | 66.7 | 31.0 | 2,862 |
| Hallsberg | 92.7 | 6.1 | 11,329 | 49.6 | 28.1 | 7.8 | 9.1 | 3.4 | 1.9 | 0.1 | 6,004 | 5,101 | 53.0 | 45.0 | 903 |
| Hällefors | 92.2 | 3.9 | 7,235 | 64.5 | 15.7 | 5.0 | 5.4 | 7.7 | 1.5 | 0.3 | 5,223 | 1,885 | 72.2 | 26.1 | 3,338 |
| Karlskoga | 92.6 | 13.6 | 25,049 | 53.9 | 18.2 | 11.1 | 10.0 | 5.2 | 1.0 | 0.5 | 14,813 | 9,849 | 59.1 | 39.3 | 4,964 |
| Kumla | 92.2 | 6.3 | 11,553 | 47.3 | 25.9 | 8.9 | 10.6 | 4.6 | 2.6 | 0.1 | 5,997 | 5,240 | 51.9 | 45.4 | 757 |
| Laxå | 92.5 | 3.0 | 5,591 | 51.6 | 25.6 | 6.9 | 8.2 | 4.0 | 3.2 | 0.5 | 3,106 | 2,275 | 55.6 | 40.7 | 831 |
| Lindesberg | 92.0 | 8.9 | 16,420 | 45.8 | 31.6 | 10.2 | 7.2 | 3.1 | 1.8 | 0.2 | 8,031 | 8,052 | 48.9 | 49.0 | 21 |
| Ljusnarsberg | 89.6 | 2.6 | 4,776 | 58.2 | 23.0 | 6.8 | 3.9 | 6.3 | 1.6 | 0.1 | 3,081 | 1,610 | 64.5 | 33.7 | 1,471 |
| Nora | 91.5 | 3.4 | 6,277 | 49.0 | 25.8 | 9.3 | 9.7 | 3.9 | 2.2 | 0.1 | 3,319 | 2,814 | 52.9 | 44.8 | 505 |
| Örebro | 91.5 | 43.7 | 80,670 | 44.5 | 23.8 | 13.2 | 12.3 | 4.1 | 1.6 | 0.7 | 39,180 | 39,691 | 48.6 | 49.2 | 511 |
| Total | 91.9 | 3.4 | 184,721 | 48.7 | 24.0 | 10.8 | 10.0 | 4.3 | 1.7 | 0.4 | 97,898 | 82,792 | 53.0 | 44.8 | 15,106 |
Source: SCB

=== Östergötland ===
| Location | Turnout | Share | Votes | S | C | M | FP | VPK | KDS | Other | L-vote | R-vote | Left | Right | Margin |
| Location | % | % | | % | % | % | % | % | % | % | | | % | % | |
|---|---|---|---|---|---|---|---|---|---|---|---|---|---|---|---|
| Boxholm | 93.4 | 1.6 | 4,134 | 54.0 | 27.7 | 7.9 | 4.6 | 4.2 | 1.3 | 0.2 | 2,407 | 1,664 | 58.2 | 40.3 | 743 |
| Finspång | 94.2 | 6.1 | 15,981 | 55.8 | 19.5 | 10.3 | 8.1 | 3.3 | 2.5 | 0.4 | 9,451 | 6,073 | 59.1 | 38.0 | 3,378 |
| Kinda | 93.3 | 2.8 | 7,412 | 34.1 | 40.0 | 14.7 | 6.2 | 1.7 | 3.4 | 0.0 | 2,648 | 4,511 | 35.7 | 60.9 | 1,863 |
| Linköping | 92.7 | 29.0 | 75,520 | 43.1 | 21.3 | 17.4 | 11.3 | 4.4 | 2.2 | 0.4 | 35,831 | 37,758 | 47.4 | 50.0 | 1,927 |
| Mjölby | 92.4 | 6.6 | 17,128 | 46.5 | 28.1 | 12.5 | 7.7 | 3.1 | 2.0 | 0.1 | 8,494 | 8,264 | 49.6 | 48.2 | 230 |
| Motala | 92.3 | 12.5 | 32,644 | 51.0 | 21.7 | 12.3 | 9.5 | 3.4 | 1.9 | 0.2 | 17,762 | 14,196 | 54.4 | 43.5 | 3,566 |
| Norrköping | 91.1 | 30.1 | 78,564 | 47.4 | 20.1 | 17.6 | 9.5 | 3.5 | 1.6 | 0.4 | 39,994 | 37,033 | 50.9 | 47.1 | 2,961 |
| Söderköping | 92.6 | 2.7 | 6,954 | 33.2 | 37.4 | 17.3 | 8.3 | 1.7 | 1.9 | 0.1 | 2,431 | 4,380 | 35.0 | 63.0 | 1,949 |
| Valdemarsvik | 93.6 | 2.4 | 6,229 | 46.7 | 30.4 | 13.0 | 5.3 | 2.8 | 1.9 | 0.1 | 3,079 | 3,028 | 49.4 | 48.6 | 51 |
| Ydre | 93.8 | 1.2 | 3,031 | 25.8 | 45.2 | 11.3 | 12.7 | 1.5 | 3.4 | 0.1 | 826 | 2,098 | 27.3 | 69.2 | 1,272 |
| Åtvidaberg | 93.9 | 3.4 | 8,862 | 54.5 | 24.6 | 10.6 | 6.2 | 1.7 | 2.3 | 0.1 | 4,987 | 3,666 | 56.3 | 41.4 | 1,321 |
| Ödeshög | 92.4 | 1.6 | 4,143 | 36.1 | 37.8 | 13.1 | 7.5 | 1.8 | 3.6 | 0.1 | 1,571 | 2,420 | 37.9 | 58.4 | 849 |
| Total | 92.3 | 4.8 | 260,602 | 46.2 | 23.3 | 15.3 | 9.4 | 3.5 | 2.0 | 0.3 | 129,481 | 125,091 | 49.7 | 48.0 | 4,390 |
Source: SCB
