= Frinnaryd =

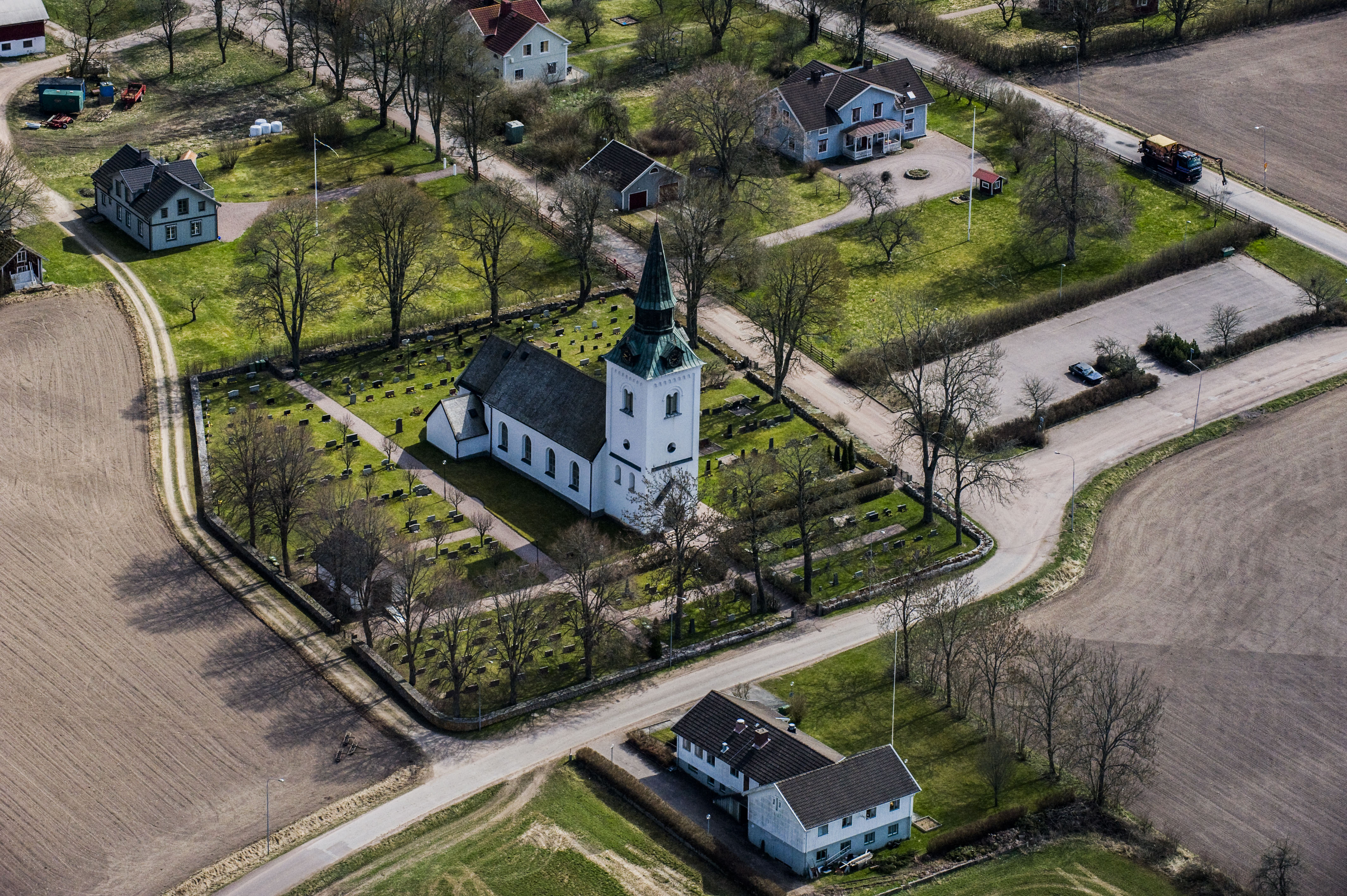

- Location within Jönköping Location within Sweden
- Coordinates: 57°56′N 14°49′E
- Country: Sweden
- Province: Småland
- County: Jönköping County
- Municipality: Aneby Municipality

Area
  - Total: 0.51 km^{2} (0.20 sq mi)

Population (2017)
  - Total: 226
  - Density: 401/km^{2} (1,040/sq mi)
- Time zone: UTC+1 (CET)
  - Summer (DST): UTC+2 (CEST)

Frinnaryd is a locality situated in Aneby Municipality, Jönköping County, Sweden with 226 inhabitants in 2017.
