= Aneby =

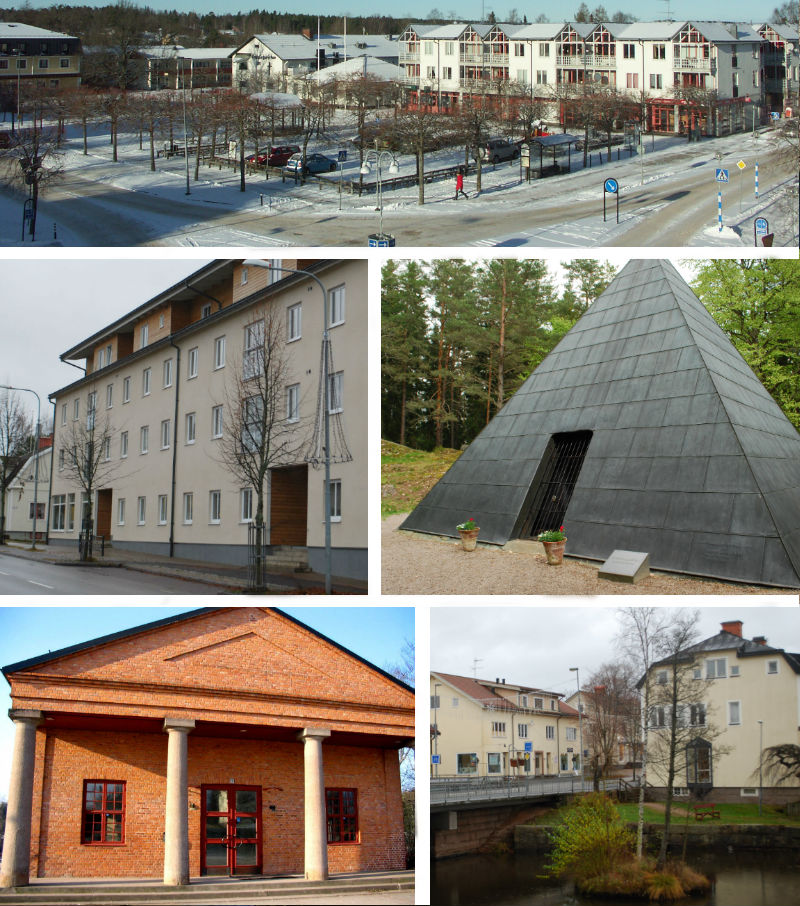
- Top: the main square of Aneby. Mid-left: a recent architectural addition. Mid-right: burial site of Malte Liewen Stierngranat. Bottom left: the concert hall. Bottom right: the river of Svartån.

- Location within Jönköping Location within Sweden
- Coordinates: 57°50′N 14°48′E
- Country: Sweden
- Province: Småland
- County: Jönköping County
- Municipality: Aneby Municipality

Area
  - Total: 3.37 km^{2} (1.30 sq mi)

Population (31 December 2010)
  - Total: 3,367
  - Density: 1,000/km^{2} (2,600/sq mi)
- Time zone: UTC+1 (CET)
  - Summer (DST): UTC+2 (CEST)

Aneby is a locality and the seat of Aneby Municipality in Jönköping County, Sweden. While the municipality has about 6500 inhabitants, half live in the central town of Aneby. The municipality lies amidst the south Swedish highlands, 45 kilometers from Jönköping and can be found along highway route 34 that stretches from Tranås in the north to Eksjö in the south.

== History ==
Though the 1900s brought the most dramatic changes to Aneby, there is evidence that supports there being humans around since the Stone Age. Though one event prior to the events of the early 20th century was also quite important to this once primarily rural society which is the construction of a rail line in (inaugurated 1874) that stretched from Aneby to Nässjö, which is still used to this day. This brought better communications to the city and conspired to its growth. A problem at the time was that most of the land in the area was owned by Johan Axel Schreiber who owned the farm Aneby gård. However, this all changed once Anders Petter Andersson came to town, bought the farm from Schreiber in 1906 and started selling parts of land to people who wanted to settle in the area, as well as creating roads. This caused the society to grow at a significant rate. A total of 120 apartments were constructed from 1906 - the year Andersson started selling land - to 1920. But the city's growth did not stop there: every year up until the 1950s at least one new company started up in the area, among them a butcher, car repair shop and brewery

1966 was the year when Aneby municipality was created due to Bredaryd's and Hullaryd's municipalities' fusing into one. A few years later, in 1978, a study concentrating on population growth concluded that the municipality of Aneby would reach 6975 inhabitants in 1990. This turned out to be an underestimate as the municipality grew to 7159 inhabitants that year. This was, however, the turning point for the growth of the municipality as it in 2015 has 6521 people living within its borders

== Geography ==
The landscape is characterized by Rut plateau terrain with intersecting valley routes and altitudes between, some in the form of long rock drumlins. The bottom of the valley is on 200 and the heights on 300 m about sea level or higher. The river of Svartån flows from south to north and forms between Aneby Lake and Lake Ralången the 19-meter-high (62 ft) waterfall Stalpet. Moraine soils dominate, but the glacial lake sediments and glacier valleys occurs. Quaternary scientifically interesting formations are beach terraces, sandspit and a series of small transverse ridges, which runs perpendicular to the main esker in Bredestad Valley. Aneby is 70% covered by forests, mainly coniferous forest. Where deciduous forest and pastures occurs the landscape becomes brighter.

The agricultural landscape is characterized by the way of height buildings. The farms lie singly or in tandem on the crest or slope positions, with field closest to the farm and pasture and forest further down the slope. Higher up the frost risk is less and the soil finer than the boulder-strewn soil in the bottom of the valleys.

== Population ==
The municipality has had a stable population growth since the mid-1980s. About 60% live in urban areas and 52% in the main town.

== Trade and industry ==
Aneby can be counted as agriculture and forestry municipality (7% of the working population is employed in agriculture and forestry). The transport geographically favorable location and the availability raw wood material and labor have favored industrialization. About 33% of the workforce are linked to industrial activity, concentrated in the central town. The previously dominant timber industry in recent years has declined in importance, and the economy is now more diversified and dominated by small and medium enterprises. Among the larger companies include Attends Healthcare AB (dressings and medical supplies), Hags AB (park and play equipment for the outdoor environment), Anebyhus AB (house production) and Fläkt Woods AB (vents), all in the main town. Approximately 1/3 of the workforce is employed in the public sector.
