= Sundhultsbrunn =

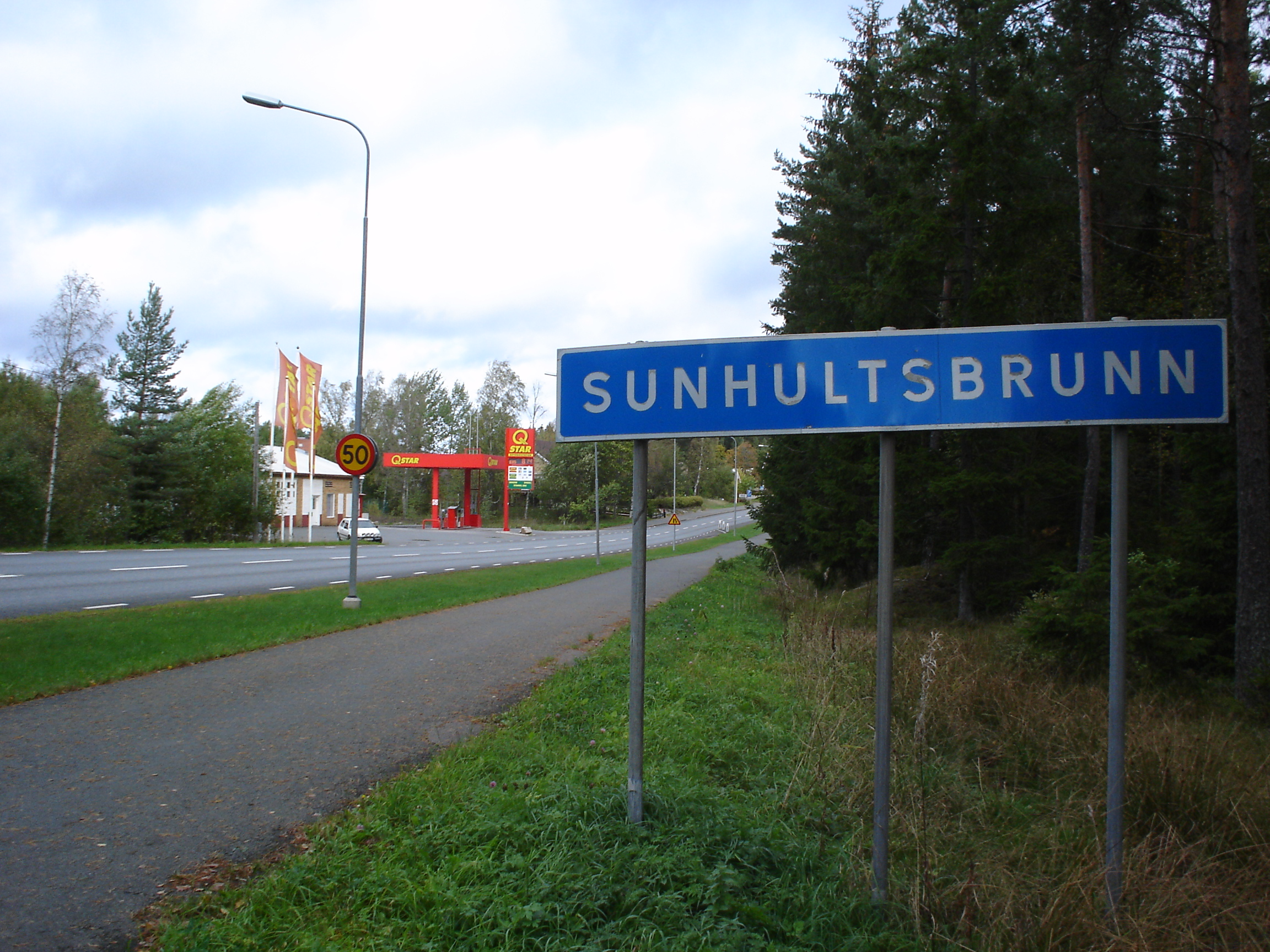

- Location within Jönköping Location within Sweden
- Coordinates: 57°55′N 14°54′E
- Country: Sweden
- Province: Småland
- County: Jönköping County
- Municipality: Aneby Municipality

Area
  - Total: 0.40 km^{2} (0.15 sq mi)

Population (31 December 2010)
  - Total: 311
  - Density: 776/km^{2} (2,010/sq mi)
- Time zone: UTC+1 (CET)
  - Summer (DST): UTC+2 (CEST)

Sundhultsbrunn is a locality situated in Aneby Municipality, Jönköping County, Sweden with 311 inhabitants in 2010.
