= Aneby Municipality =

Aneby Municipality Aneby kommun
- Municipality
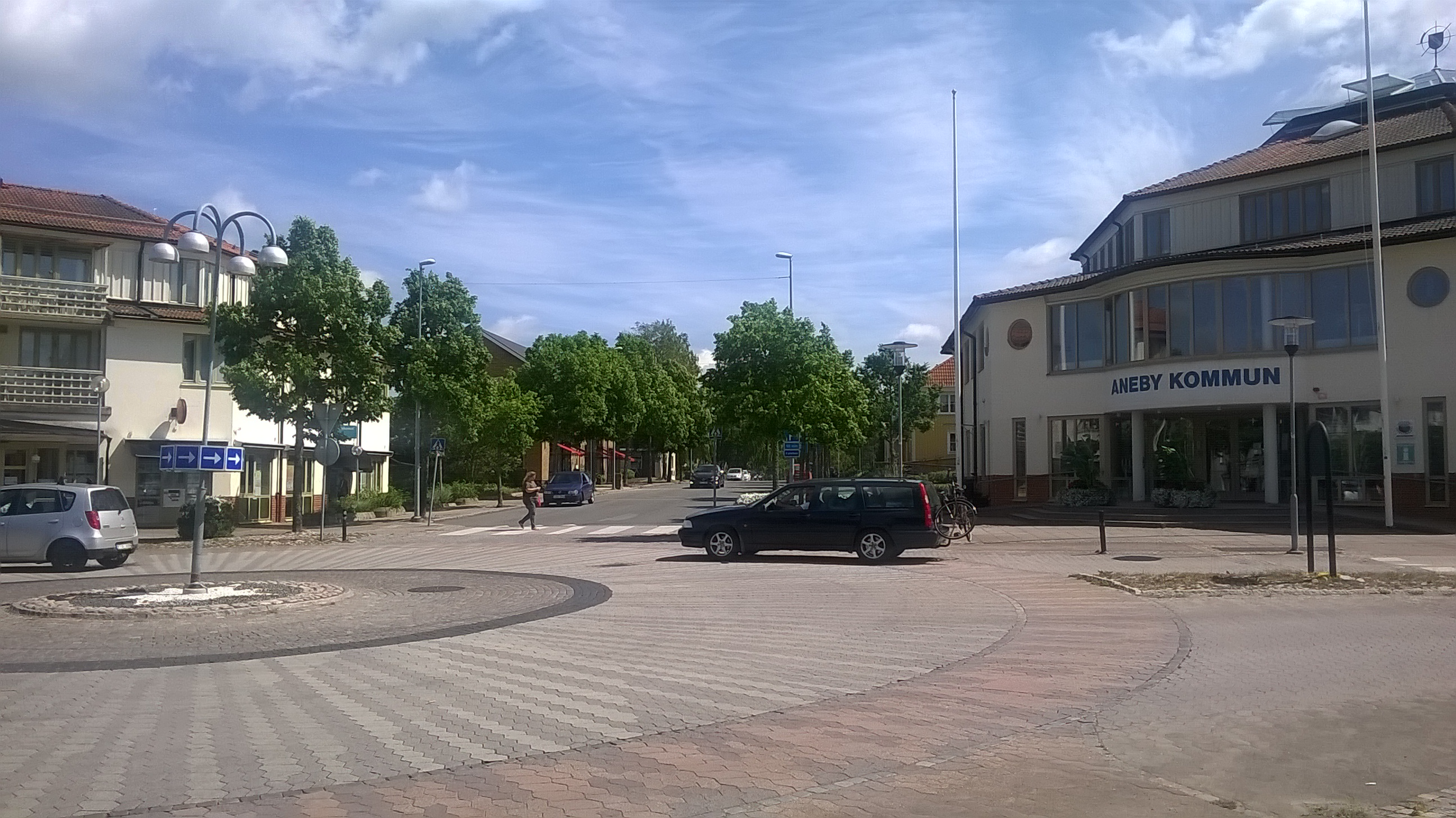

- Coat of arms

- Coordinates: 57°50′N 14°48′E
- Country: Sweden
- County: Jönköping County
- Seat: Aneby

Area
  - Total: 553.89 km^{2} (213.86 sq mi)
  - Land: 517.76 km^{2} (199.91 sq mi)
  - Water: 36.13 km^{2} (13.95 sq mi)
- Area as of 1 January 2014.

Population (30 June 2025)
  - Total: 6,817
  - Density: 13.17/km^{2} (34.10/sq mi)
- Time zone: UTC+1 (CET)
  - Summer (DST): UTC+2 (CEST)
- ISO 3166 code: SE
- Province: Småland
- Municipal code: 0604
- Website: www.aneby.se

Aneby Municipality (Swedish: Aneby kommun) is a municipality in Jönköping County in southern Sweden, where the town Aneby is the seat.

The municipality was formed in 1967 when the municipalities of Bredestad and Hullaryd, both created in 1952 were amalgamated. The name was taken from the largest locality, Aneby, which was chosen as the seat. Before 1952 there were nine municipalities in the area.

== Localities ==
There are 3 urban areas (or localities) in Aneby Municipality.

In the table the localities are listed according to the size of the population as of December 31, 2005. The municipal seat is in bold characters.

#	Locality	Population
1	**Aneby**	3,374
2	Sundhultsbrunn	314
3	Frinnaryd	225

== Demographics ==
This is a demographic table based on Aneby Municipality's electoral districts in the 2022 Swedish general election sourced from SVT's election platform, in turn taken from SCB official statistics.

In total there were 6,887 residents, including 5,113 Swedish citizens of voting age. 39.6% voted for the left coalition and 58.6% for the right coalition. Indicators are in percentage points except population totals and income.

Location	Residents	Citizen adults	Left vote	Right vote	Employed	Swedish parents	Foreign heritage	Income SEK	Degree
Location			%	%					
Aneby S	2,478	1,761	42.5	55.6	77	73	27	22,185	32
Aneby V	2,466	1,920	38.3	60.0	86	91	9	27,506	34
Aneby Ö	1,943	1,432	40.1	58.4	84	88	12	26,175	31
Source: SVT

== Demography ==
Aneby Municipality is the smallest municipality in the county. In 1994, the population in the municipality was at an all-time high of 7,300 persons, which is attributed to refugees from former Yugoslavia. The population has since decreased, to the regret of the officials who are promoting to get it populated to the 8,000 inhabitants its service is designated for.

== Politics ==
Result of the 2010 election:

- Moderate Party 22,59%
- Centre Party 12,31%
- Liberal People's Party 5,05%
- Christian Democrats 17,66%
- Swedish Social Democratic Party 26,62%
- Left Party 2,99%
- Green Party 4,60%
- Sweden Democrats 7,62%
- Other Parties 0,57%
