= Grand Hotel (Lund) =

Hotel in Lund, Sweden

Coordinates: 55°42′13.8″N 13°11′21.9″E

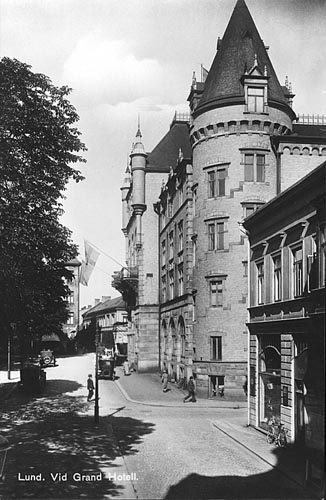
Grand Hotel in the 1920s

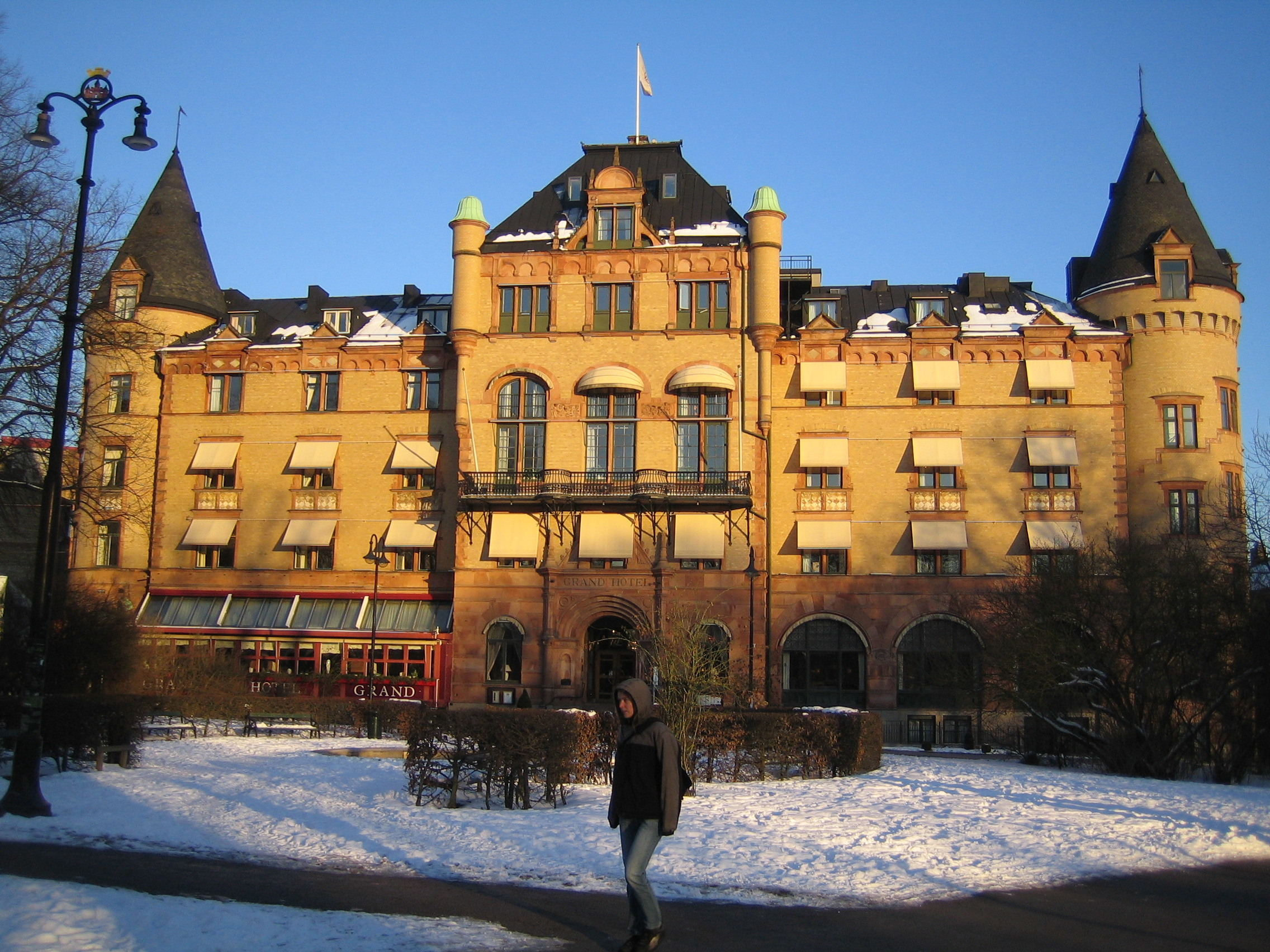
Grand Hotel seen from Bantorget

Grand Hotel in Lund, Sweden has been described as one of the city's oldest and most noteworthy hotels and restaurants. The hotel dates back to the late 19th century.

Constructed according to the design of Alfred Hellerström and inaugurated in 1899.
