= Academy of Lund =

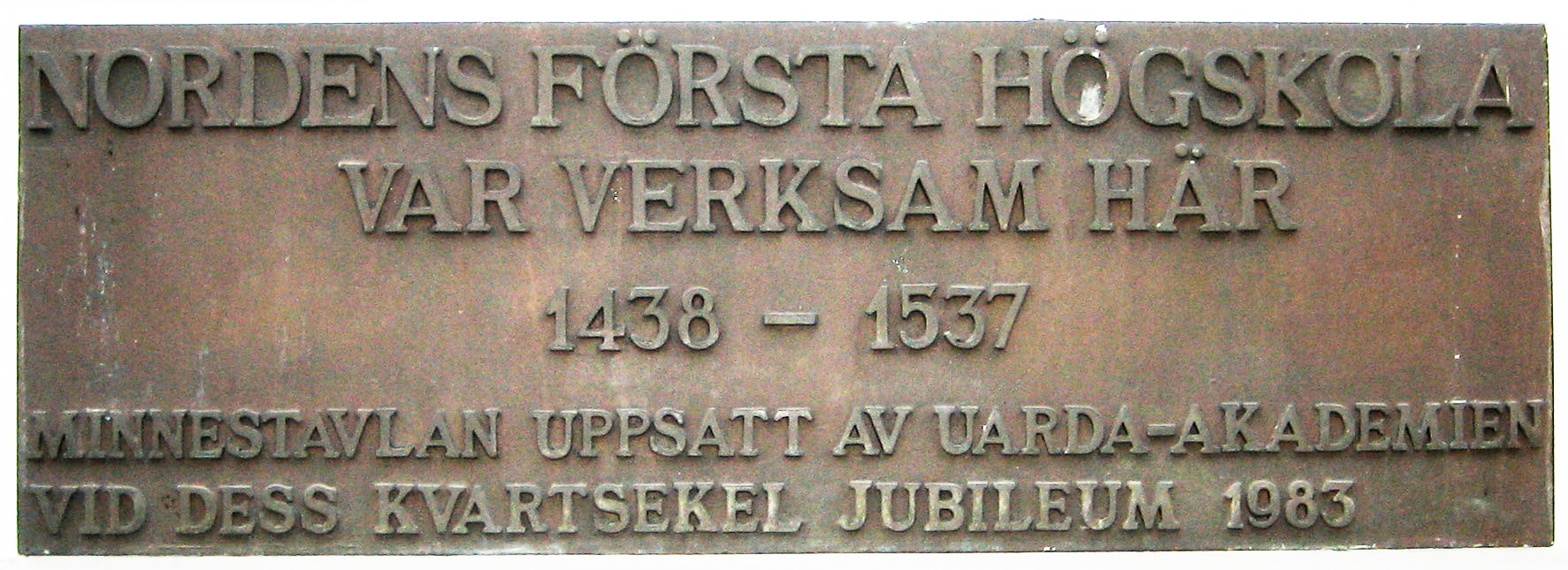
A sign in Klostergatan ("Monastery street"), Lund, marking the location of the Academy of Lund.

The Academy of Lund or Studium generale was a university in the Nordic countries. It was founded together with the Grey Friars' monastery in the 1400s, when Lund was under Danish rule. In existence for more than a century, the academy was suppressed in 1537 when the Reformation reached Denmark. The present-day Lund University is a separate institution, founded in 1666.
