= Värpinge =

Area in southern Sweden

Coordinates: 55°42′13″N 13°8′50″E

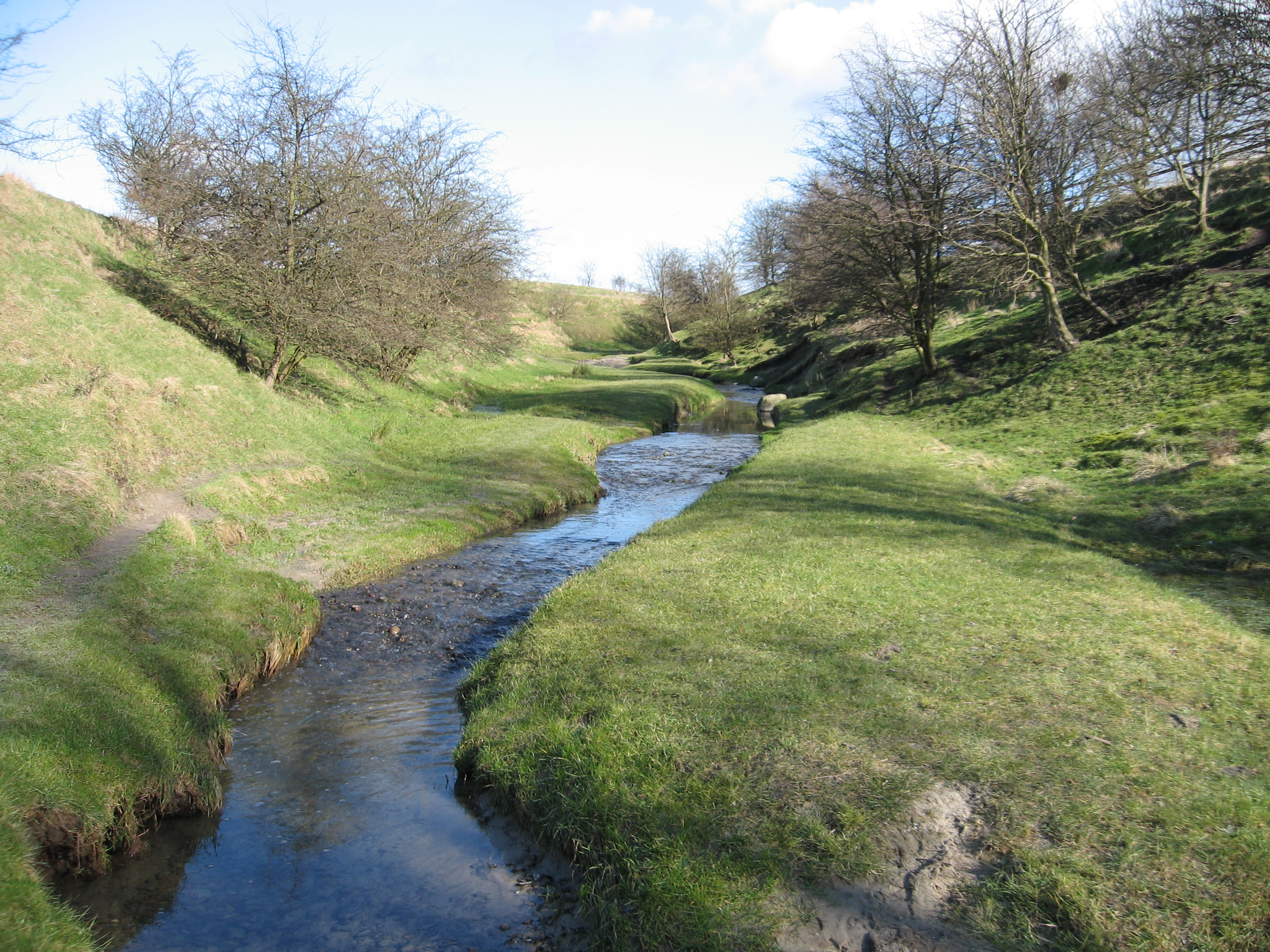
Rinnebäcken

Värpinge is a borough in western Lund, Skåne in southern Sweden. The borough covers both rural, the old Värpinge village and newer neighborhoods (close to central Lund). Värpinge is most of the times referred to as a suburb. Large parts of the area were built in the beginning of 1990. Bigger roads that go through the city district are Västra Ringen and Trollebergsvägen. Värpinge is adjacent to Rinnebäcksravinen. The area was previously called Västra Fäladen.
