= Lunds Boxningssällskap =

Swedish boxing club

- Full name: Lunds Boxningssällskap
- Short name: Lunds BS
- Sport: Boxing
- Founded: 1941
- Region: Sweden
- Based in: Lund
- Head coach: Per-Arne Ljung

Lunds Boxningsällskap or Lunds BS is a successful boxing club in Lund, Sweden, founded in 1941. The club has produced Swedish Champions and a World Champion. The club is located in Idrottshallen by Högevallsbadet in Lund. Per-Arne Ljung is the head coach.

== World Champions ==
- 2001, 2005 Anna Laurell

== Swedish Champions ==
- 2001, 2002, 2004 Said El-Tahan
- 2001, 2003, 2006, 2008 Anna Laurell
