= Stadsparken, Lund =

Park in Lund, Sweden

Stadsparken
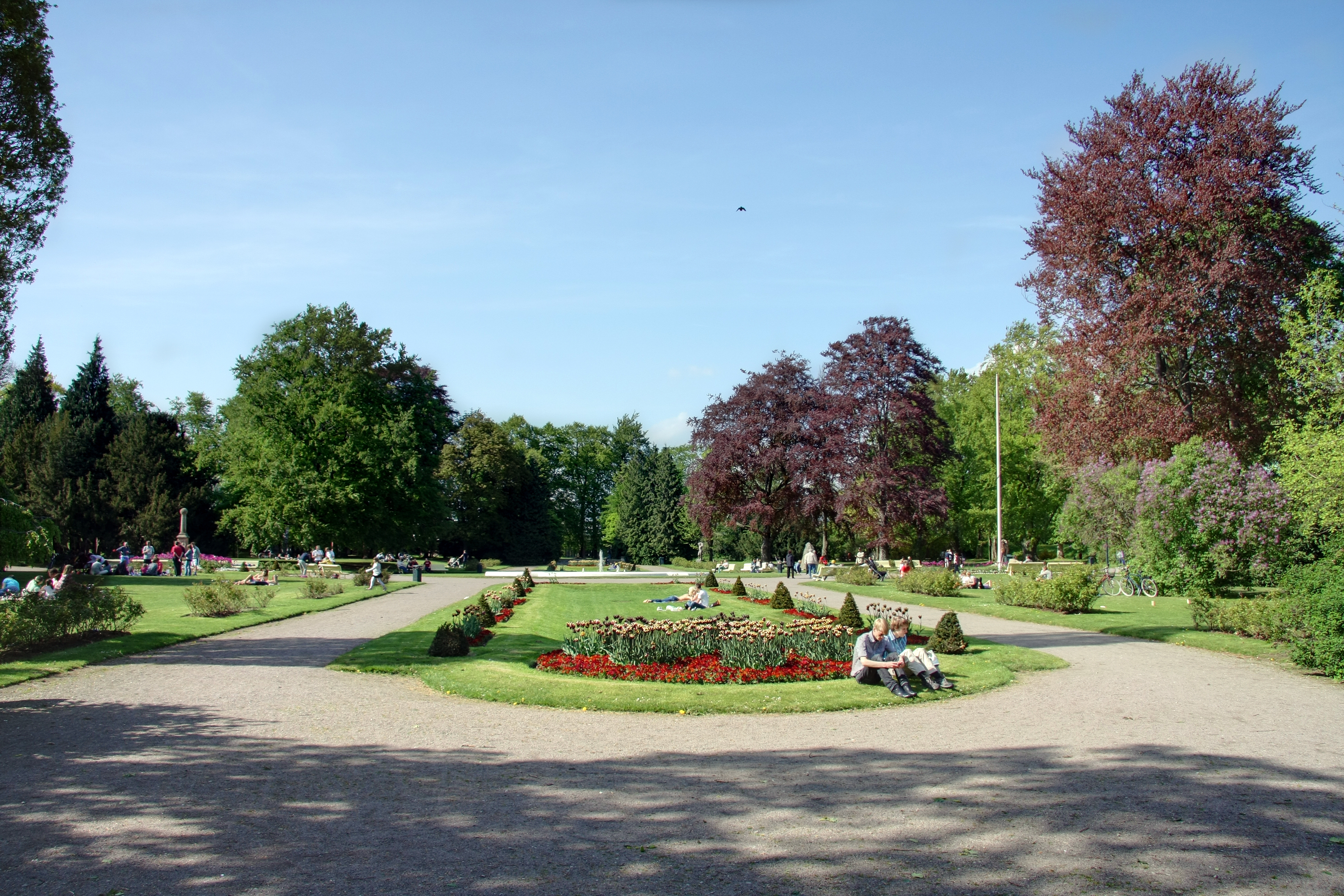
- Stadsparken in Lund
- Interactive map of Stadsparken
- Location: Lund, Sweden
- Coordinates: 55°41′56.73″N 13°11′7.89″E
- Opened: 1911
- Owner: Lund Municipality
- Status: Open year round

Stadsparken (Swedish for City's park) is a park located in central Lund. It is located within the historic Lund city area in Lund municipality in Skåne. The park celebrated its 100th anniversary in 2011. Stadsparken houses several sculptures by Gunnar Nordborg and Egon Möller-Nielsen, among others, as well as a small garden maze designed by Oscar Reutersvärd.

== Walpurgis Night ==
The last day of April, known as Walpurgis Night or Valborg in Swedish, is celebrated in Stadsparken. It has historically been Sweden's largest Valborg celebration. In 2023, an estimated 35000 people participated in Valborg at Stadsparken.

== History ==
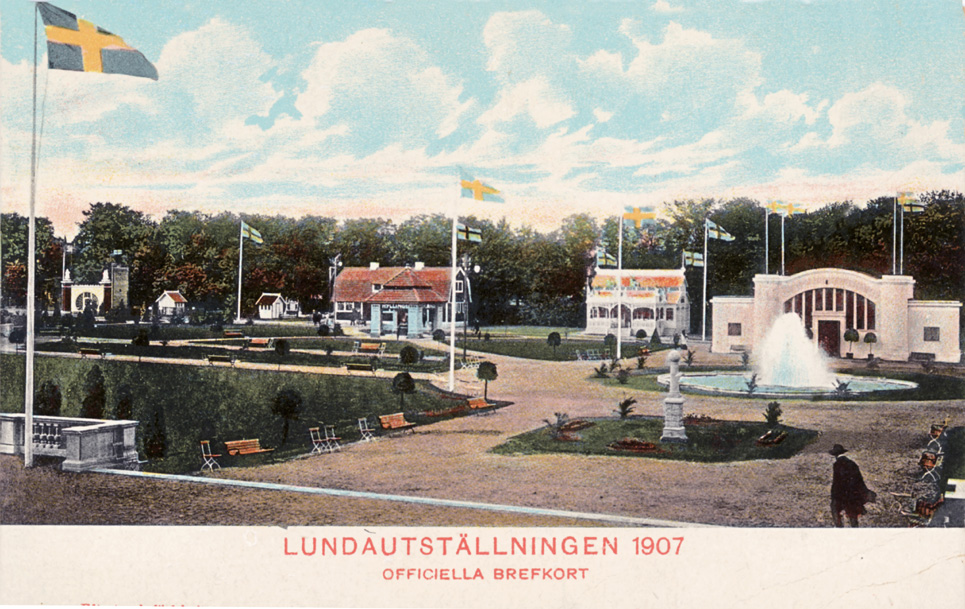
Postcard from Lundautställningen (1907), before this area became a park

City of Lund bought this plot of land in 1904. In 1907, before the area became a park, Lundautställningen exhibition was held here. In 1907 Lundautställningen had 1427 exhibitors and attracted more than ten times as many visitors as Lund's population at the time. In 1911, Stadsparken was inaugurated and opened to the public.
