= Lund =

City in Scania, Sweden

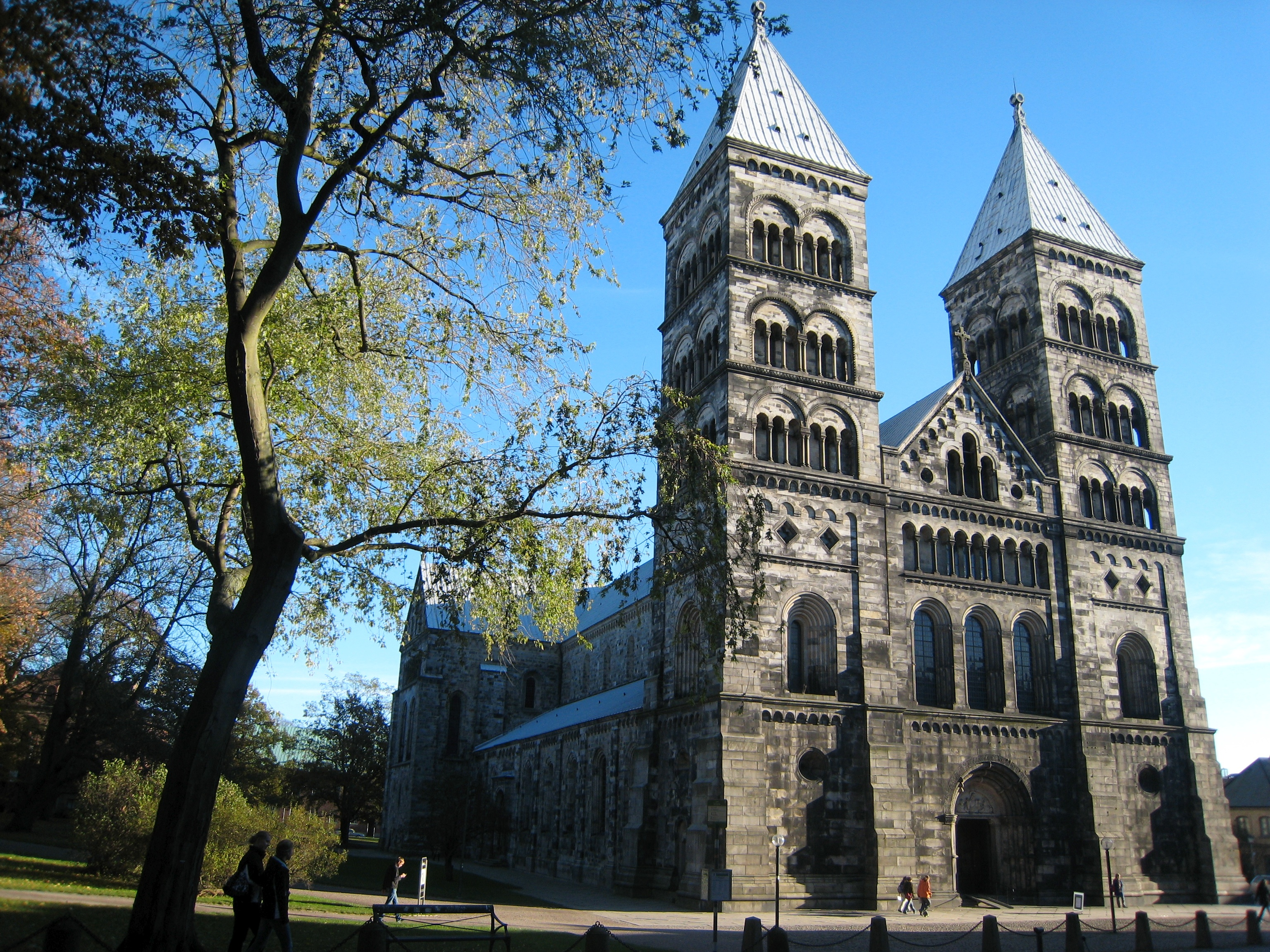
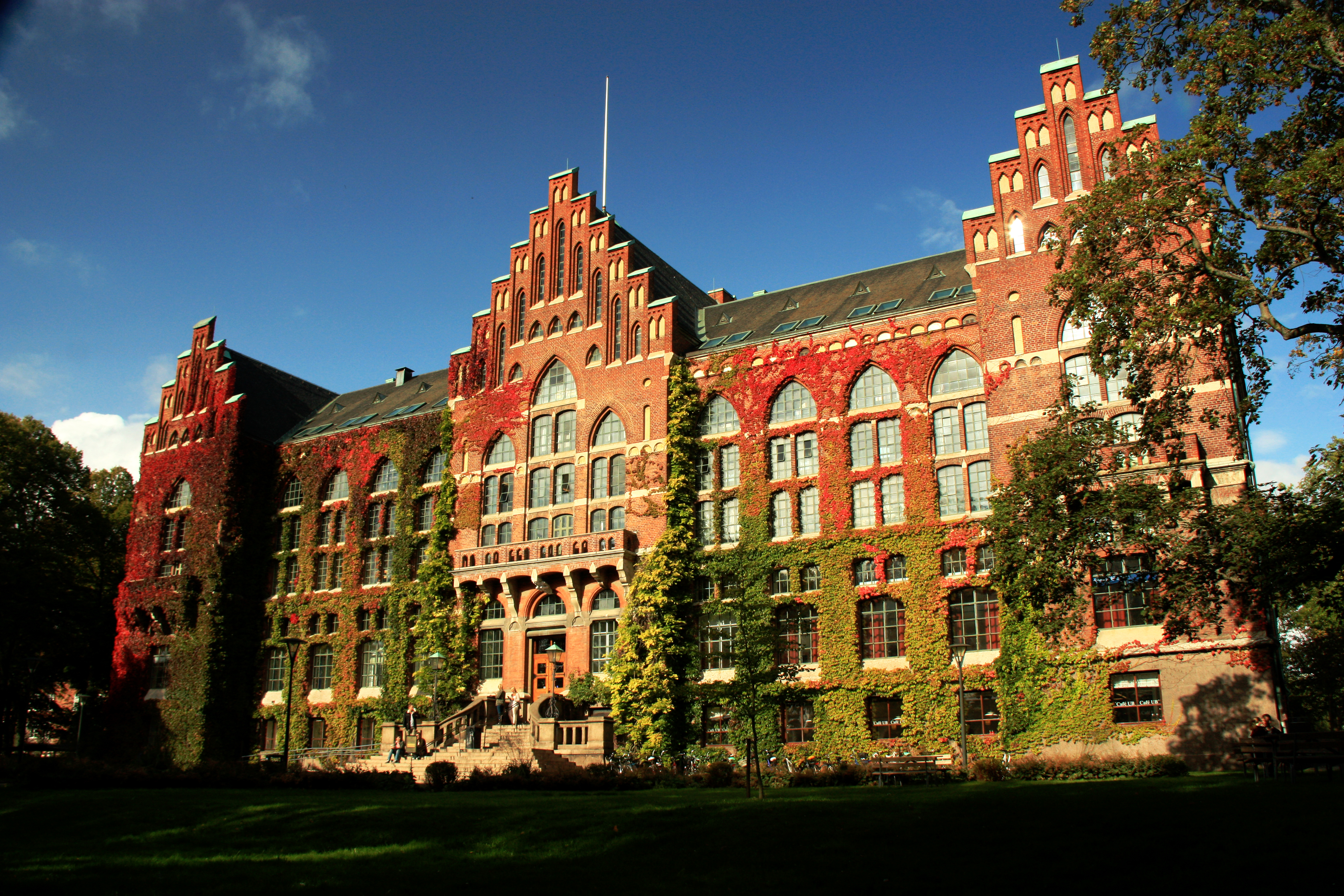
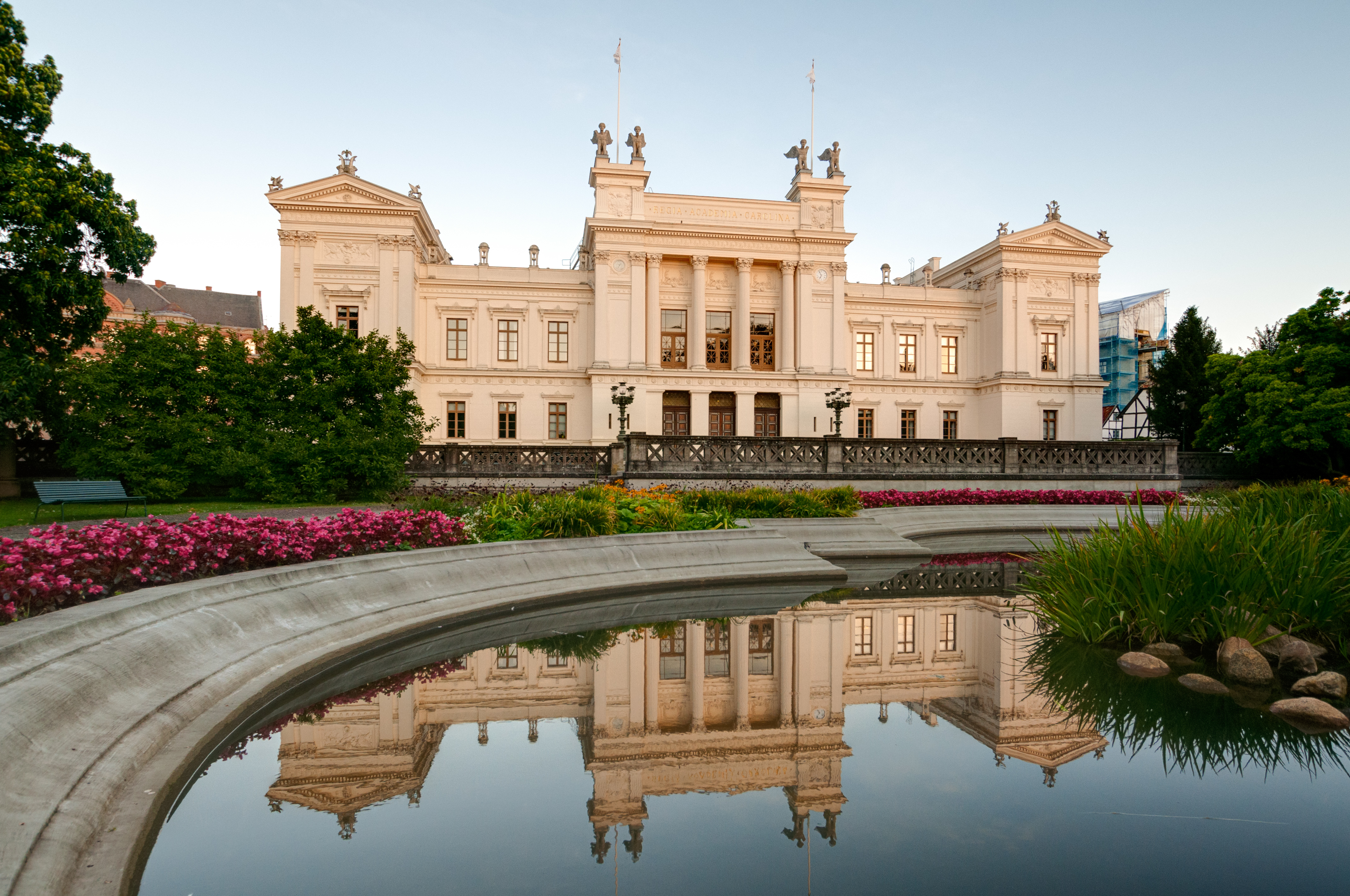
- Clockwise from top: Lund Cathedral and Lundagård; Lund University Main Building; Lund University library.

- Coat of arms
- Motto: Idéernas stad (Eng: The city of ideas)
- Location within Scania Location within Sweden Location within European Union
- Coordinates: 55°42′14″N 13°11′42″E
- Country: Sweden
- Province: Scania
- County: Scania County
- Municipality: Lund Municipality

Area
  - Total: 26.37 km^{2} (10.18 sq mi)

Population (2020)
  - Total: 94,393
  - Density: 3,580/km^{2} (9,300/sq mi)
- Demonym(s): Lundensare, Lundabo
- Time zone: UTC+1 (CET)
  - Summer (DST): UTC+2 (CEST)
- Website: lund.se/en/

Lund (/lʊnd/, US also /lʌnd/ LU(U)ND; Swedish: [ˈlɵnːd]) is a city in the province of Scania, southern Sweden. The town had 94,393 inhabitants out of a municipal total of 130,288 as of 2023. It is the seat of Lund Municipality, Scania County. The Öresund Region, which includes Lund, is home to more than 4.2 million people.

Archeologists date the founding of Lund to around 990, when Scania was part of Denmark. From 1103 it was the seat of the Catholic Archdiocese of Lund, and the towering Lund Cathedral, built c. 1090–1145, still stands at the centre of the town. Denmark ceded the city to Sweden in the Treaty of Roskilde in 1658.

Lund University, established in 1666, is one of Scandinavia's oldest and largest institutions for education and research. The university and its buildings dominate much of the centre of the city, and have led to Lund becoming a regional centre for high-tech industry.

== History ==
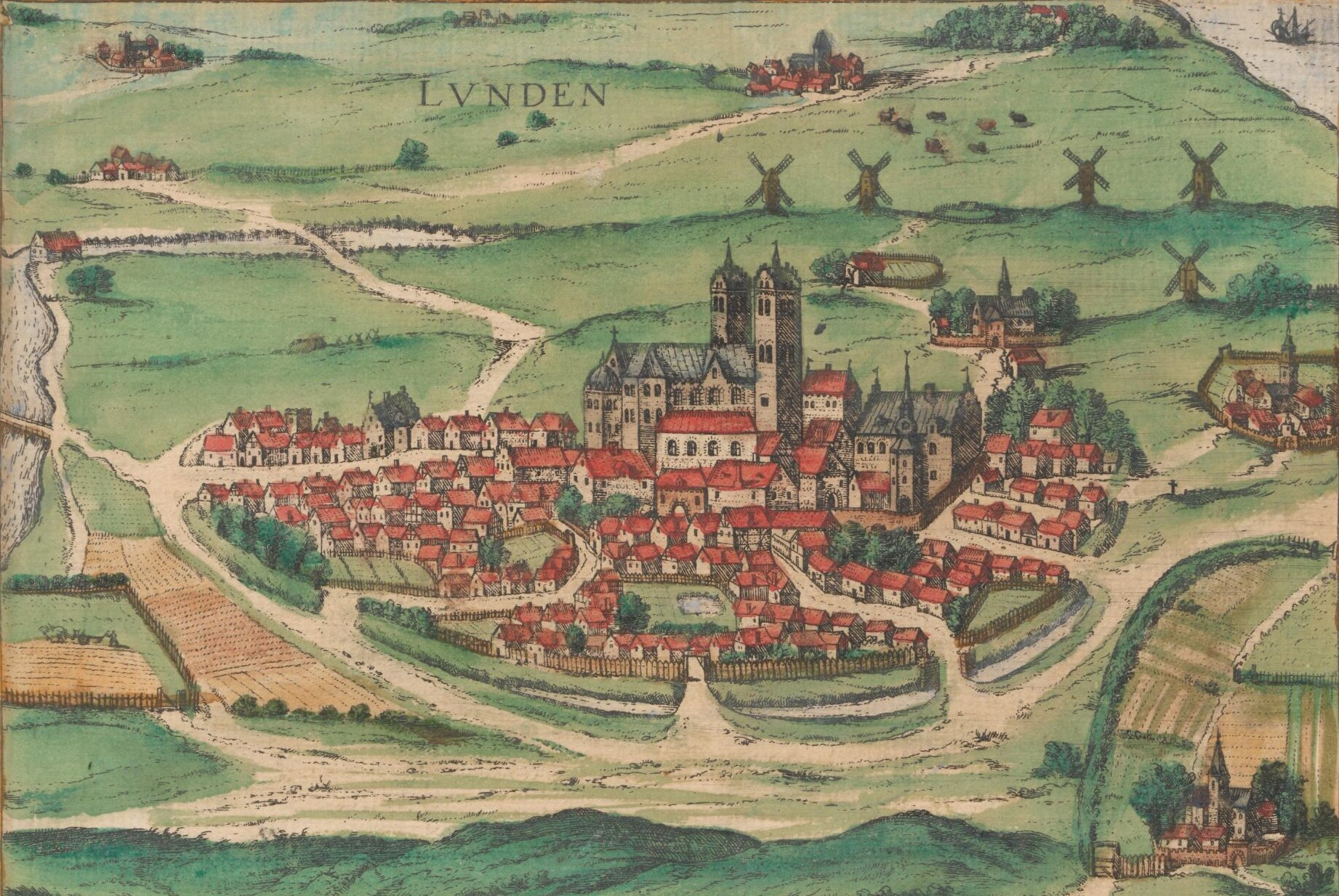
An engraving of Lund in or around 1594. By Frans Hogenbergs in the pictorial work Civitates orbis terrarum (the cities of the world).

Along with Sigtuna, Lund is the oldest city in present-day Sweden. Lund's origins are unclear. Until the 1980s, the city was thought to have been founded around 1020 by either Sweyn I Forkbeard or his son Canute the Great of Denmark. The area was then part of the kingdom of Denmark. However, recent archaeological discoveries suggest that the first settlement dated to c. 990, possibly the relocation of settlers at Uppåkra. The Uppåkra settlement dates back to the first century B.C. and its remains are at the present site of the village of Uppåkra. King Sweyn I Forkbeard moved Lund to its present location, a distance of some five kilometres (3.1 miles). The new location of Lund, on a hill and across a ford, gave the new site considerable defensive advantages in comparison with Uppåkra, situated on the highest point of a large plain.

The organisation of the Danish church begun under the rule of Canute the Great. Lund became the see of one of seven dioceses in 1048. In 1104 it became an archbishopric. Lund's ecclesiastical province comprised Scandinavia and even Garðar on Greenland.

Saint Mary Minor church was founded c. 1060. This was a post church with palisade walls, also called Sancta Maria, and was discovered in 1911 on a site just south of the great square, Stortorget. That church had been built in the mid 11th century; 1060 is postulated through dendrochronology.

The diocese of nearby Dalby was absorbed in 1066. Lund Cathedral was similarly founded in or shortly after 1103. In 1152, the Norwegian archdiocese of Nidaros was founded as a separate province of the church, independent of Lund. In 1164 Sweden also acquired an archbishop of its own, although he was nominally subordinate to the archbishop of Lund. The diocese of Lund is today a diocese in the Church of Sweden.

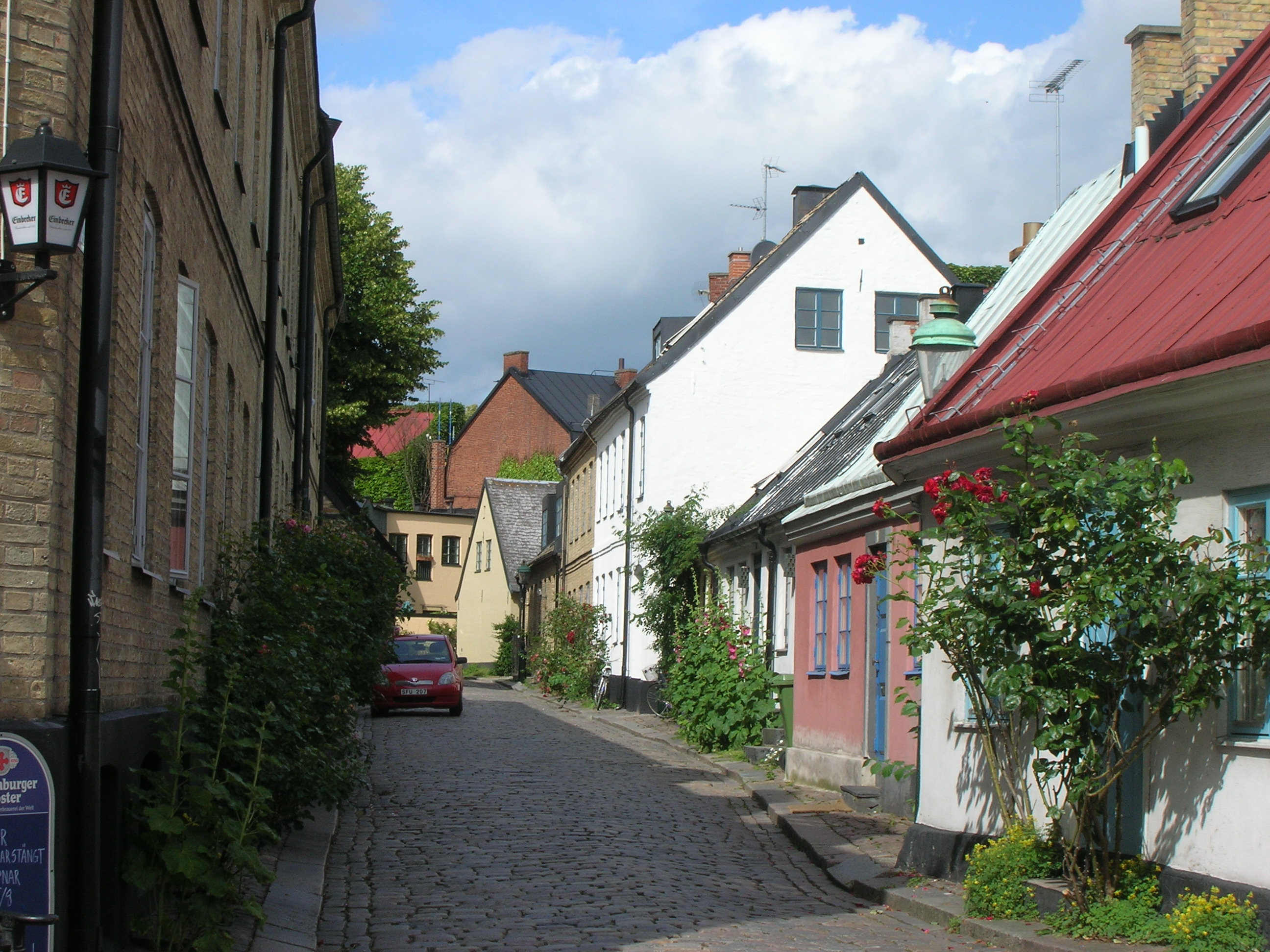
Hjortgatan, a street in the Kulturkvadraten neighborhood of Lund

Lund Cathedral School (Katedralskolan) was founded in 1085 by the Danish king Canute the Saint. This is the oldest school in Scandinavia and one of the oldest in Northern Europe. Many prominent people were educated there, among them the actor Max von Sydow and several high-ranking politicians.

Lund was ceded to Sweden in 1658 as part of the terms of the Treaty of Roskilde. It was, however, recaptured by Denmark in 1676 during the early phases of the Scanian War. The exceptionally bloody Battle of Lund was fought just north of the city in 1676, and ended in a decisive Swedish victory; Swedish control of Scania was again confirmed in the Peace of Lund later. Sweden's control over Scania, and hence Lund, was again confirmed by another treaty in 1720.

Scandinavia's first university, the Academy of Lund was founded in the 1400s. It was suppressed during the Danish Reformation in 1537. The present Lund University was established in 1666.

In 1943, during the Second World War, Lund was accidentally bombed by a British aircraft. No deaths were reported, though some people were injured by glass fragments.

Over the second half of the 20th century the population of Lund more than doubled, driven in large part by the growth of the university and high tech industries. For example, Tetra Pak, the food packaging and processing company, was founded in Lund in 1951. Suburbs were added to the outer edges of the city: Klostergården, Norra Fäladen and Linero in the 1960s, Norra Nöbbelöv in the 1970s, Gunnesbo in the 1980s and Värpinge in the 1990s.

== Geography ==
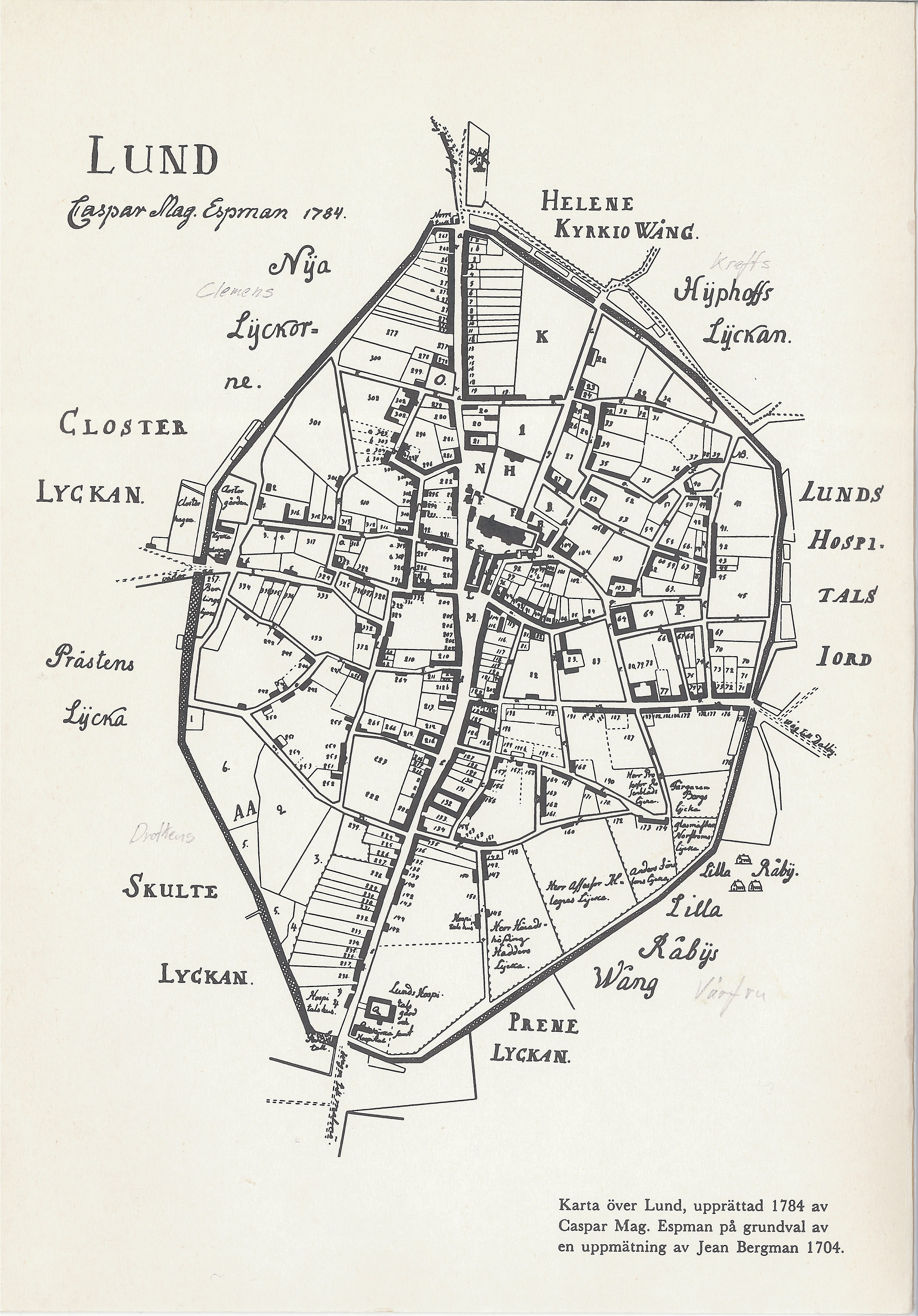
Kaspar Magnus Espman's map of Lund from 1784, showing the structure of the medieval centre.

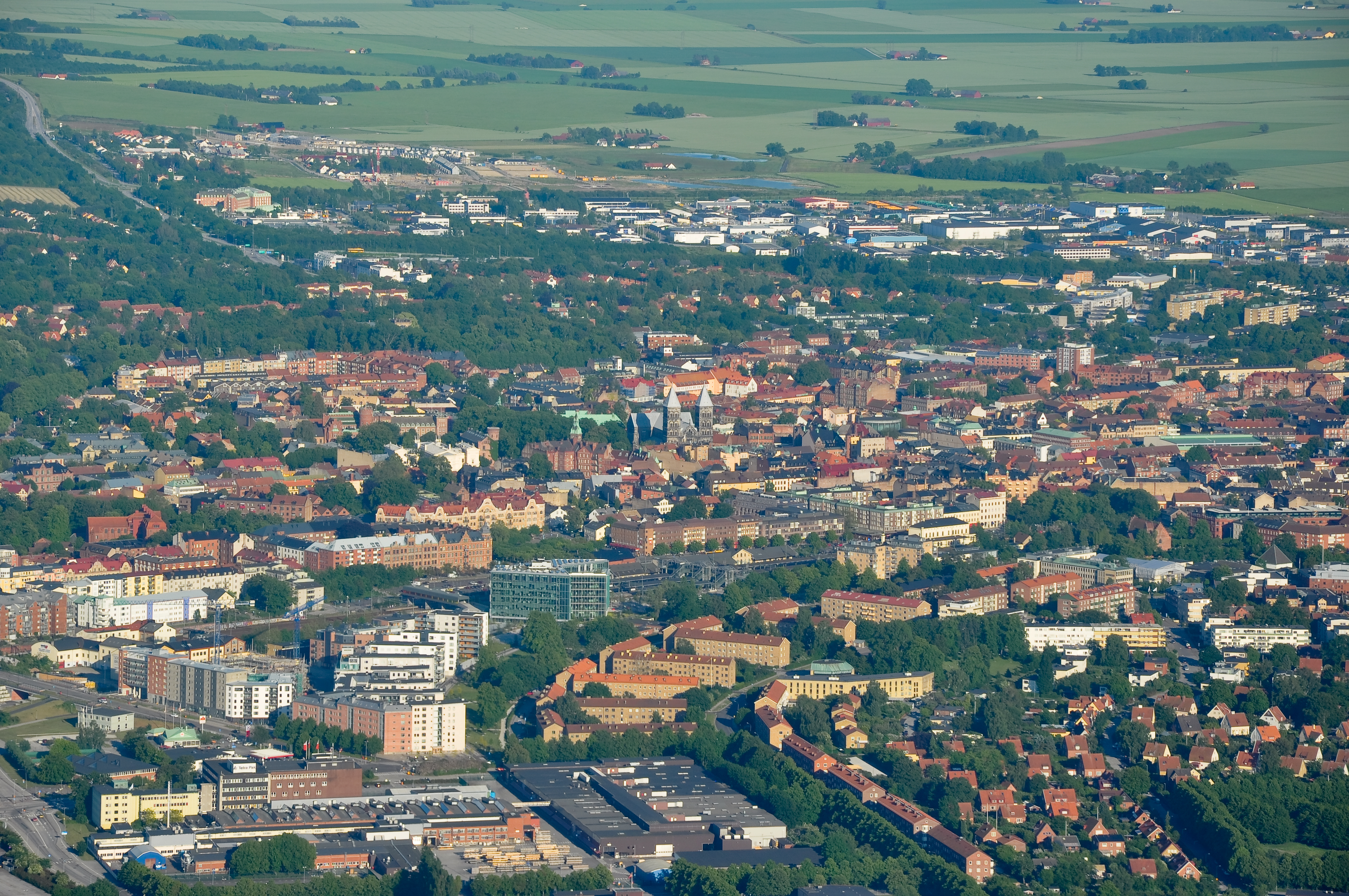
Aerial view in 2015

Lund is located in Sweden's largest agricultural district, in the south-west of Scania, less than ten kilometres (6.2 miles) from the sandy shore of the Öresund Strait. Its location on the south-facing slope of the Romeleåsen horst leads to the city rising from the low-lying Höje River in the south to 86 metres (282 feet) above mean sea level in the north. From the top of the Sankt Hans Hill it is possible to see Copenhagen, the capital of Denmark. The nearest large Swedish city, Malmö, is about 15 kilometres (9.3 miles) to the south-west. Other Swedish cities are more distant: Gothenburg is 250 kilometres (160 miles) away, the capital Stockholm is 600 kilometres (370 miles) distant, and Umeå lies 1,200 kilometres (750 miles) to the north.

The central part of Lund largely retains its medieval street layout. A few buildings from the Middle Ages remain, including Lund Cathedral, Liberiet, St. Peter's Priory, the restaurant Stäket and Krognoshuset. Many of today's buildings in the centre were constructed in the late 1800s, including Katedralskolan, the Grand Hotel and the main building and library of Lund University.

=== City squares ===
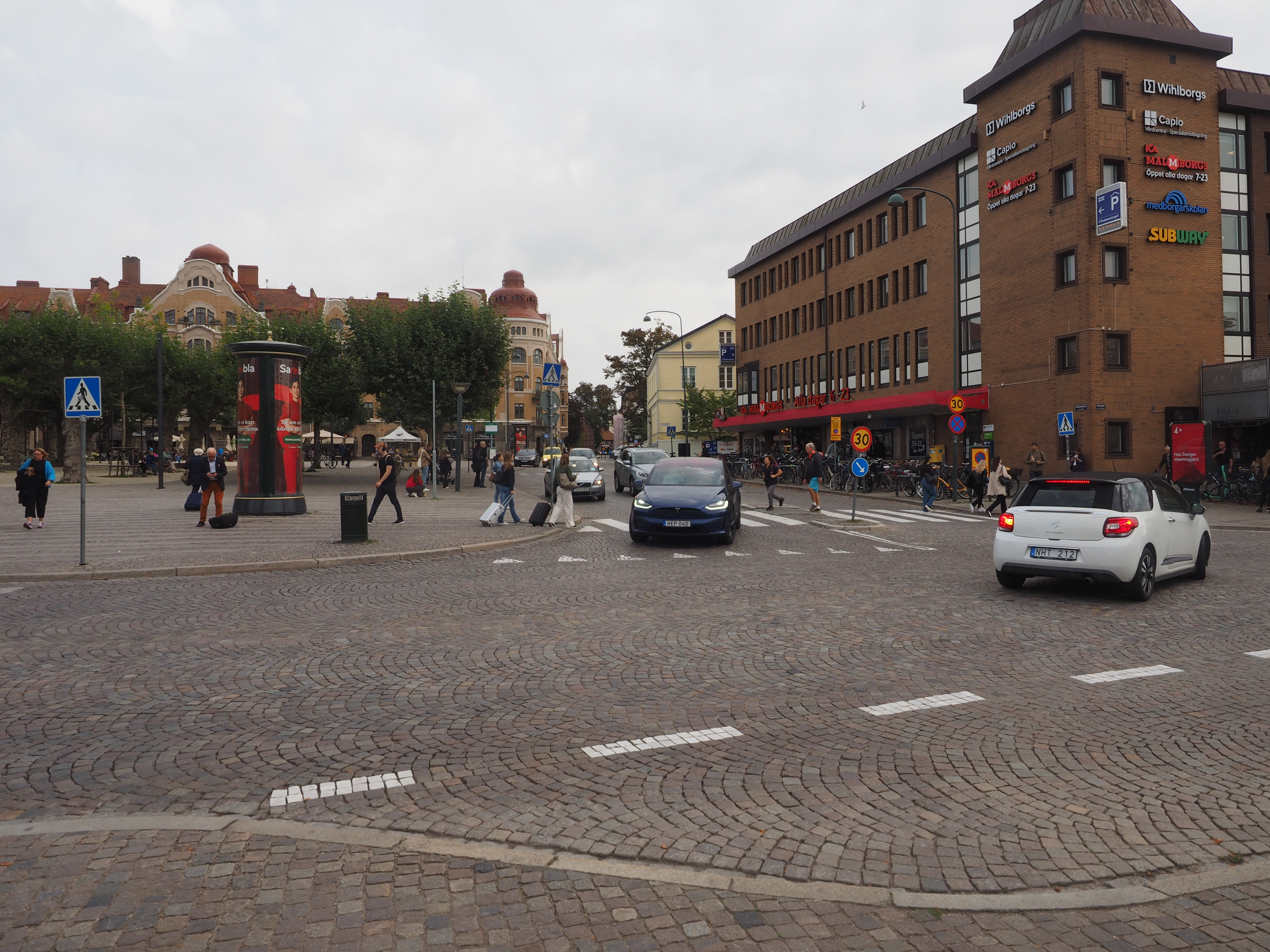
A view of central Lund just outside the railway station. Clemenstorget is on the left.

Lund contains four main city squares connected by a number of roads and passages that form the main city centre, which includes numerous restaurants, shops and bars. Clemenstorget is a tree-covered city square located alongside the railway and the station; it hosts a small market and is the central terminus of the city's tramway. Bantorget is a green park square close to the central station, and Lund's Grand Hotel is located there. The city hall is located on the main city square, Stortorget, which often features concerts and various cultural and political events. Mårtenstorget hosts the Lund Market Hall; it has many restaurants, food trucks and bars around it and serves as a market square during the daytime. In earlier times, the square was used as a cattle market and was known as "Oxtorget". Smaller city squares in Lund include Domkyrkoplatsen, Petriplatsen, Västra stationstorget, Sockertorget and Knut den Stores Torg.

=== Parks and nature ===
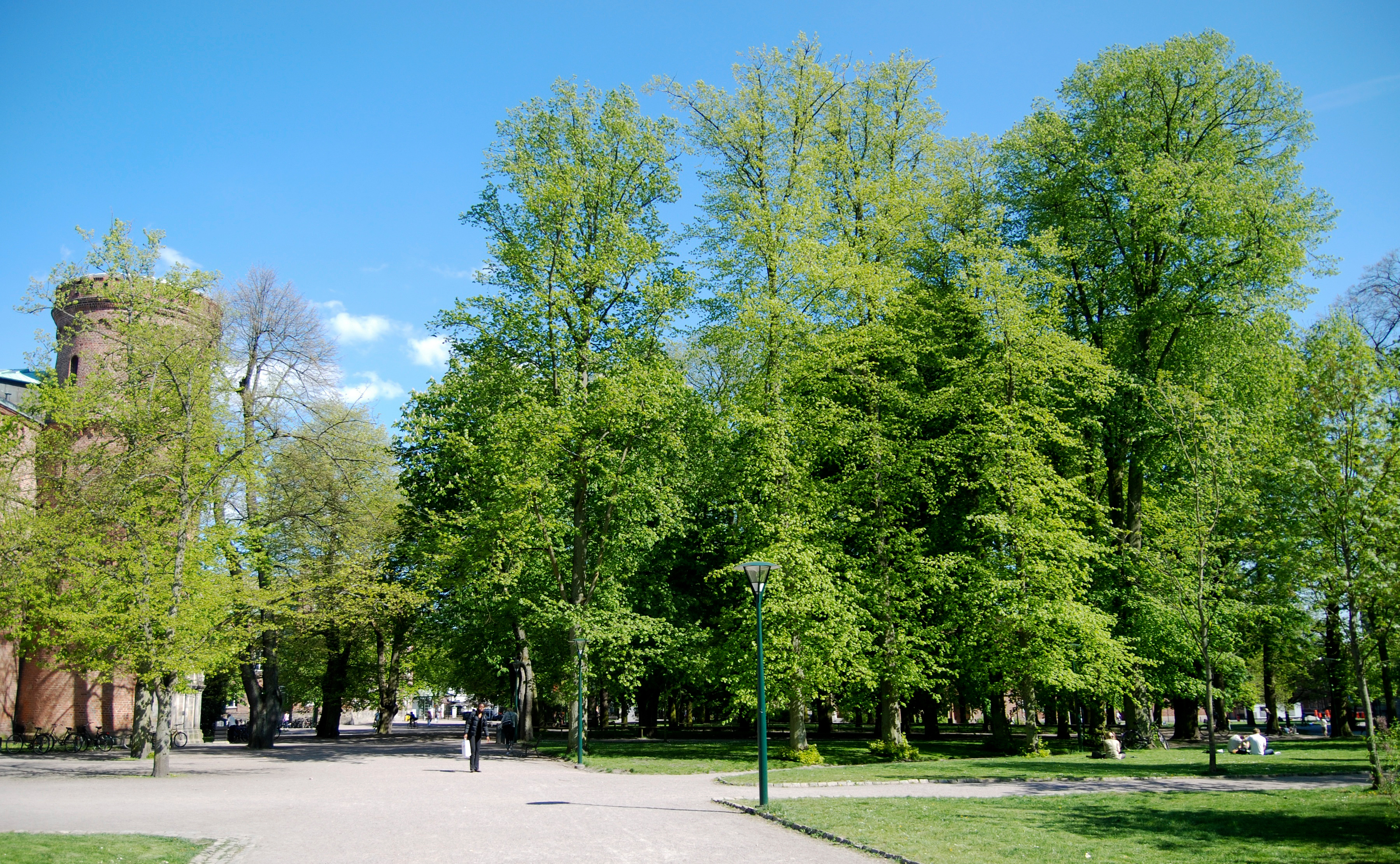
The Lundagård park in central Lund.

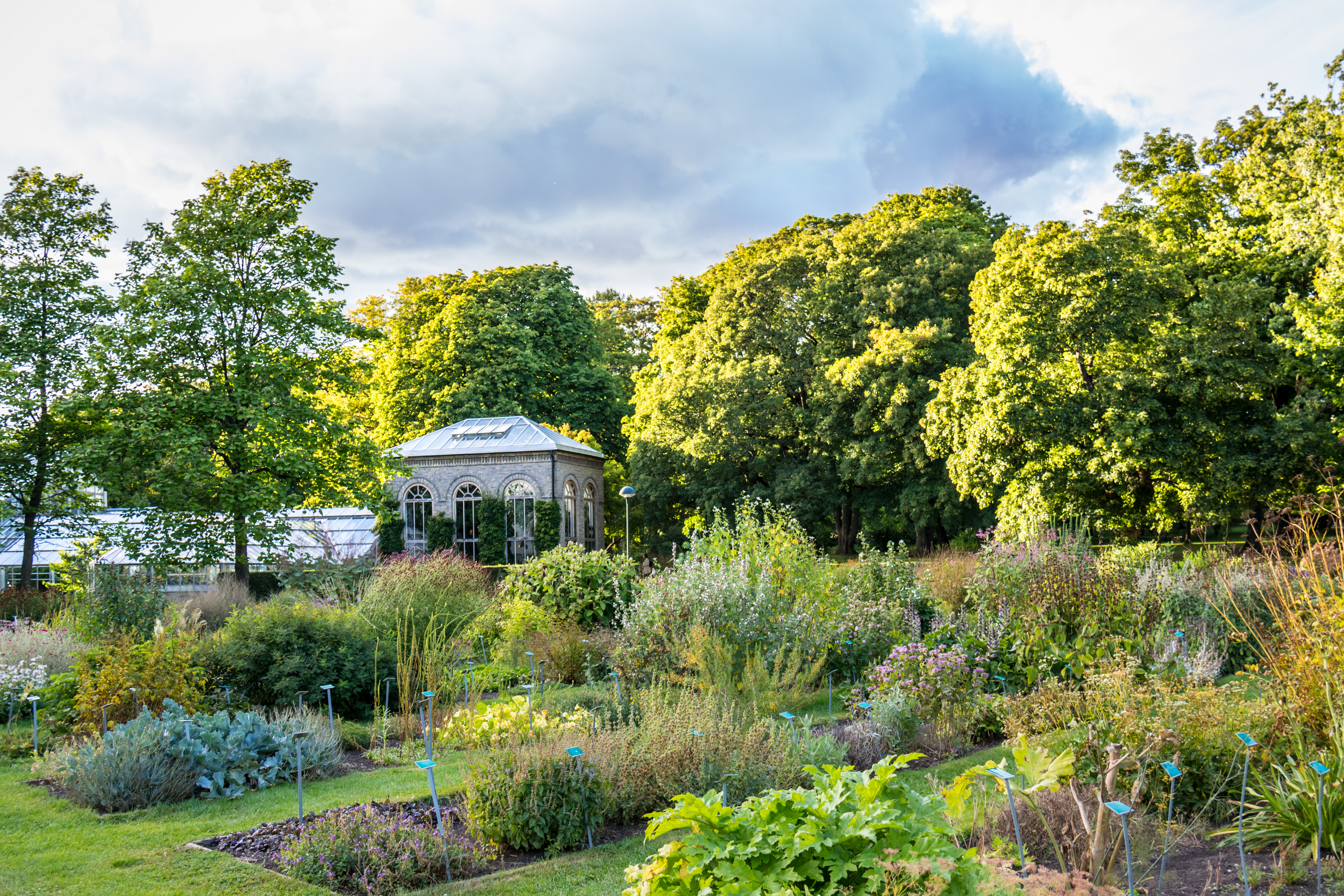
The Botanical Garden in Lund

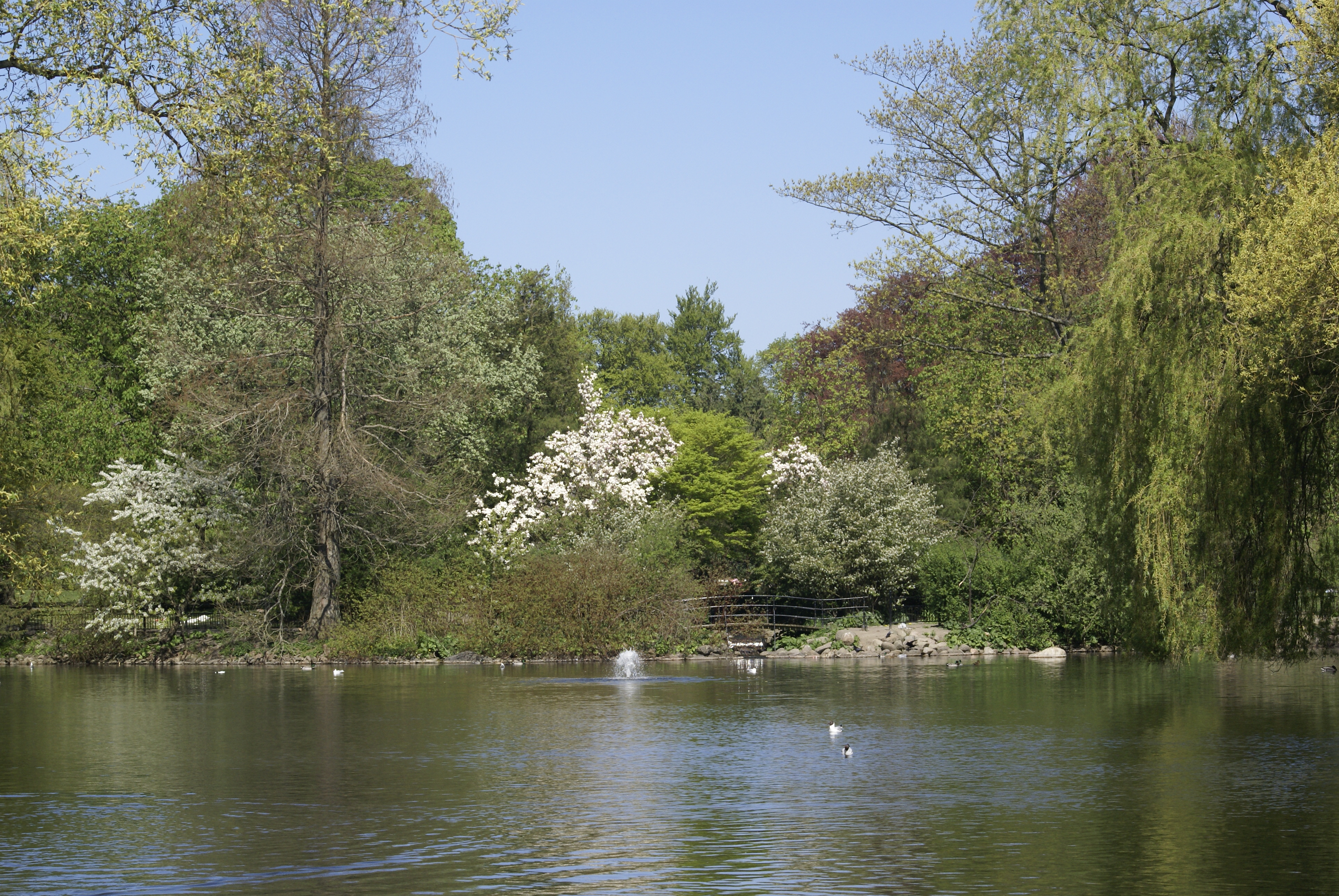
The pond in Stadsparken.

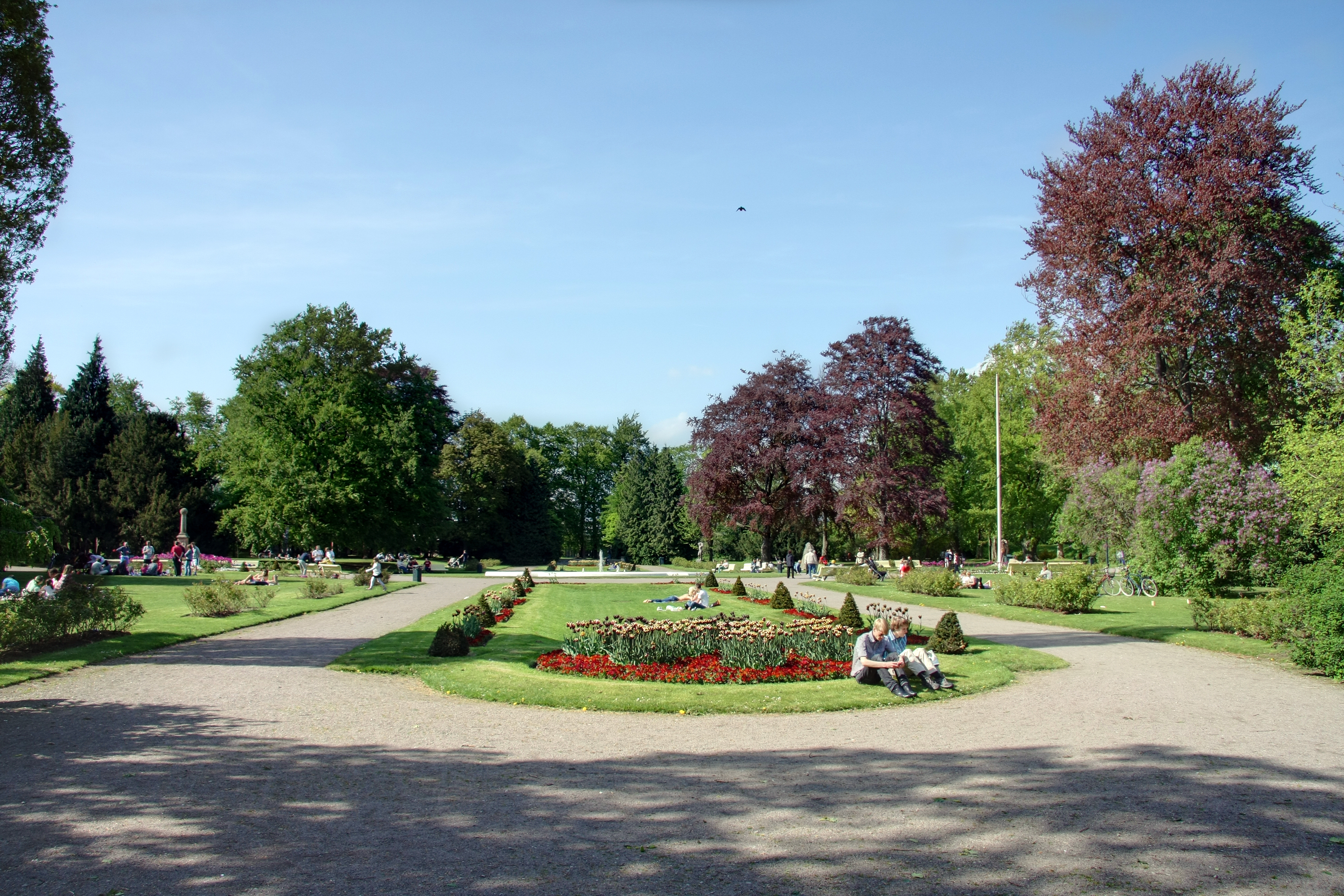
Stadsparken - Lund's main city park.

Lund's most central park is Lundagård, which, along with the adjoining University square, forms the centre of the University. The park is dominated by historic buildings including Lund Cathedral, Lund University Main Building, and Kungshuset. The trees of the park are home to a large colony of rooks.

The much larger main city park (Stadsparken) is located in the south-west corner of the city center. The site was used for the Lund Exhibition in 1907 and subsequently developed into a public park between 1909 and 1911. The park contains planted gardens, a small lake, a playground and bandstands, as well as the public swimming center Högevallsbadet and the former buildings of Lund Observatory. It also has a menagerie that houses different varieties of birds.

Other significant areas of greenery in the city include the Botanical Garden (Botaniska trädgården) and Sankt Hans Hill in the north of the city. The nature preserve Rinnebäck Gorge (Rinnebäcksravinen), The Källby dams (Källby dammar) and the community park Folkparken are located in the western part of the city. The nature preserve Nöbbelövs Marshland (Nöbbelövs mosse) is located in the northwest of the city.

Popular places for swimming close to the city are the beaches in neighboring Lomma, Bjärred and Malmö and lakes such as the nature preserve Billebjer and the Dalby quarry (Dalby stenbrott) in the eastern countryside of the city.

=== Climate ===
Lund, like the rest of far southern Sweden, has an oceanic climate. The climate is relatively mild compared to other locations at similar latitudes, or even somewhat further south, mainly because of its proximity to the sea. Because of Lund's northerly latitude, daylight lasts as long as 17 hours at midsummer, and only around 7 hours in mid-winter.

Summers are warm and pleasant with average high temperatures of 23 °C (73 °F) and lows of around 14 °C (57 °F), but temperatures often exceed 25 °C (77 °F) and heat waves are common during the summer. Winters are quite chilly, with temperatures steady between −1 and 3 °C (30 and 37 °F). Lund has arguably the mildest climate of the country in average highs. In terms of yearly means and average lows Falsterbo, a fellow medieval town some 50 kilometers away, is marginally milder.

Rainfall is light to moderate throughout the year with an average of 169 wet days. Snowfall occurs sparingly, mainly from December to March, but snow cover does not typically remain for a long time, and some winters are virtually free of snow.

Climate data for Lund, 1991–2020 normals and extremes
Month	Jan	Feb	Mar	Apr	May	Jun	Jul	Aug	Sep	Oct	Nov	Dec	Year
Record high °C (°F)	10.9 (51.6)	14.0 (57.2)	19.3 (66.7)	27.1 (80.8)	28.9 (84.0)	36.3 (97.3)	34.3 (93.7)	34.4 (93.9)	31.1 (88.0)	22.4 (72.3)	17.1 (62.8)	12.0 (53.6)	36.3 (97.3)
Mean maximum °C (°F)	7.7 (45.9)	8.4 (47.1)	13.8 (56.8)	20.7 (69.3)	24.8 (76.6)	27.6 (81.7)	29.4 (84.9)	28.9 (84.0)	23.6 (74.5)	17.8 (64.0)	12.3 (54.1)	8.9 (48.0)	30.8 (87.4)
Mean daily maximum °C (°F)	3.0 (37.4)	3.4 (38.1)	6.7 (44.1)	12.7 (54.9)	17.5 (63.5)	20.6 (69.1)	23.2 (73.8)	22.7 (72.9)	18.2 (64.8)	12.5 (54.5)	7.4 (45.3)	4.3 (39.7)	12.7 (54.8)
Daily mean °C (°F)	0.9 (33.6)	1.0 (33.8)	3.2 (37.8)	7.8 (46.0)	12.4 (54.3)	15.8 (60.4)	18.3 (64.9)	17.9 (64.2)	14.0 (57.2)	9.3 (48.7)	5.2 (41.4)	2.3 (36.1)	9.0 (48.2)
Mean daily minimum °C (°F)	−1.2 (29.8)	−1.1 (30.0)	0.2 (32.4)	3.7 (38.7)	7.9 (46.2)	11.5 (52.7)	13.9 (57.0)	13.9 (57.0)	10.7 (51.3)	6.6 (43.9)	3.2 (37.8)	0.3 (32.5)	5.8 (42.4)
Mean minimum °C (°F)	−10.3 (13.5)	−8.4 (16.9)	−6.0 (21.2)	−2.1 (28.2)	1.9 (35.4)	6.2 (43.2)	9.4 (48.9)	8.5 (47.3)	4.3 (39.7)	−0.8 (30.6)	−3.9 (25.0)	−8.0 (17.6)	−12.8 (9.0)
Record low °C (°F)	−18.8 (−1.8)	−16.0 (3.2)	−16.3 (2.7)	−5.7 (21.7)	−1.2 (29.8)	3.4 (38.1)	6.6 (43.9)	5.3 (41.5)	0 (32)	−8.5 (16.7)	−9.7 (14.5)	−19.4 (−2.9)	−19.4 (−2.9)
Average precipitation mm (inches)	54.5 (2.15)	42.7 (1.68)	39.7 (1.56)	33.9 (1.33)	43.1 (1.70)	62.9 (2.48)	62.3 (2.45)	79.3 (3.12)	60.5 (2.38)	68.1 (2.68)	61.3 (2.41)	67.8 (2.67)	676.1 (26.62)
Source 1: SMHI Open Data
Source 2: SMHI 1991-2020 normals

Climate data for Lund 2011-2024; precipitation 1961–1990
Month	Jan	Feb	Mar	Apr	May	Jun	Jul	Aug	Sep	Oct	Nov	Dec	Year
Record high °C (°F)	10.9 (51.6)	14.0 (57.2)	19.3 (66.7)	25.3 (77.5)	28.9 (84.0)	36.3 (97.3)	34.3 (93.7)	34.4 (93.9)	31.1 (88.0)	22.4 (72.3)	15.1 (59.2)	12.0 (53.6)	34.4 (93.9)
Mean maximum °C (°F)	7.8 (46.0)	8.1 (46.6)	14.8 (58.6)	20.4 (68.7)	25.6 (78.1)	27.8 (82.0)	30.0 (86.0)	29.1 (84.4)	24.3 (75.7)	18.3 (64.9)	12.5 (54.5)	9.1 (48.4)	30.9 (87.6)
Mean daily maximum °C (°F)	3.8 (38.8)	5.2 (41.4)	7.9 (46.2)	13.3 (55.9)	18.3 (64.9)	22.1 (71.8)	23.4 (74.1)	23.5 (74.3)	19.4 (66.9)	13.3 (55.9)	8.6 (47.5)	5.5 (41.9)	13.7 (56.6)
Daily mean °C (°F)	1.8 (35.2)	2.6 (36.7)	4.2 (39.6)	8.4 (47.1)	13.2 (55.8)	17.1 (62.8)	18.5 (65.3)	18.5 (65.3)	15.3 (59.5)	10.5 (50.9)	6.3 (43.3)	3.6 (38.5)	10.0 (50.0)
Mean daily minimum °C (°F)	0.0 (32.0)	0.6 (33.1)	1.0 (33.8)	4.1 (39.4)	8.4 (47.1)	12.4 (54.3)	14.0 (57.2)	14.2 (57.6)	11.5 (52.7)	7.7 (45.9)	4.1 (39.4)	1.9 (35.4)	6.7 (44.0)
Mean minimum °C (°F)	−11.4 (11.5)	−8.3 (17.1)	−6.9 (19.6)	−1.9 (28.6)	1.7 (35.1)	6.2 (43.2)	9.7 (49.5)	8.3 (46.9)	3.9 (39.0)	−1.3 (29.7)	−4.3 (24.3)	−7.6 (18.3)	−13.3 (8.1)
Record low °C (°F)	−18.8 (−1.8)	−14.6 (5.7)	−16.3 (2.7)	−5.7 (21.7)	−0.7 (30.7)	3.4 (38.1)	8.1 (46.6)	5.3 (41.5)	0.0 (32.0)	−8.5 (16.7)	−9.7 (14.5)	−19.4 (−2.9)	−19.4 (−2.9)
Average precipitation mm (inches)	56.4 (2.22)	41.3 (1.63)	36.3 (1.43)	30.0 (1.18)	41.3 (1.63)	66.2 (2.61)	69.2 (2.72)	91.6 (3.61)	44.8 (1.76)	71.2 (2.80)	65.0 (2.56)	69.7 (2.74)	683 (26.89)
Mean monthly sunshine hours	43.6	62.8	143.4	215.2	258.7	247.6	251.7	211.9	173.8	110.3	49.9	29.1	1,798
Source 1: SMHI Open Data
Source 2: SMHI Average Data 2002–2018

== Demographics ==
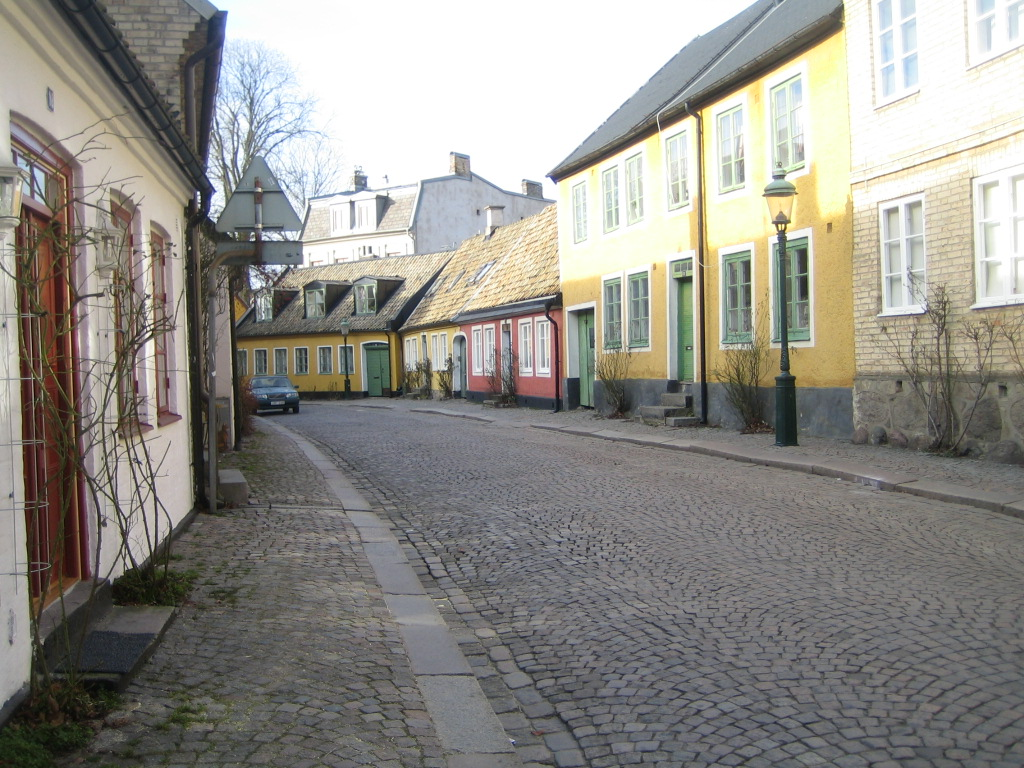
Adelgatan ("Nobility Street" in current Swedish but originally meant Main Street), Lund

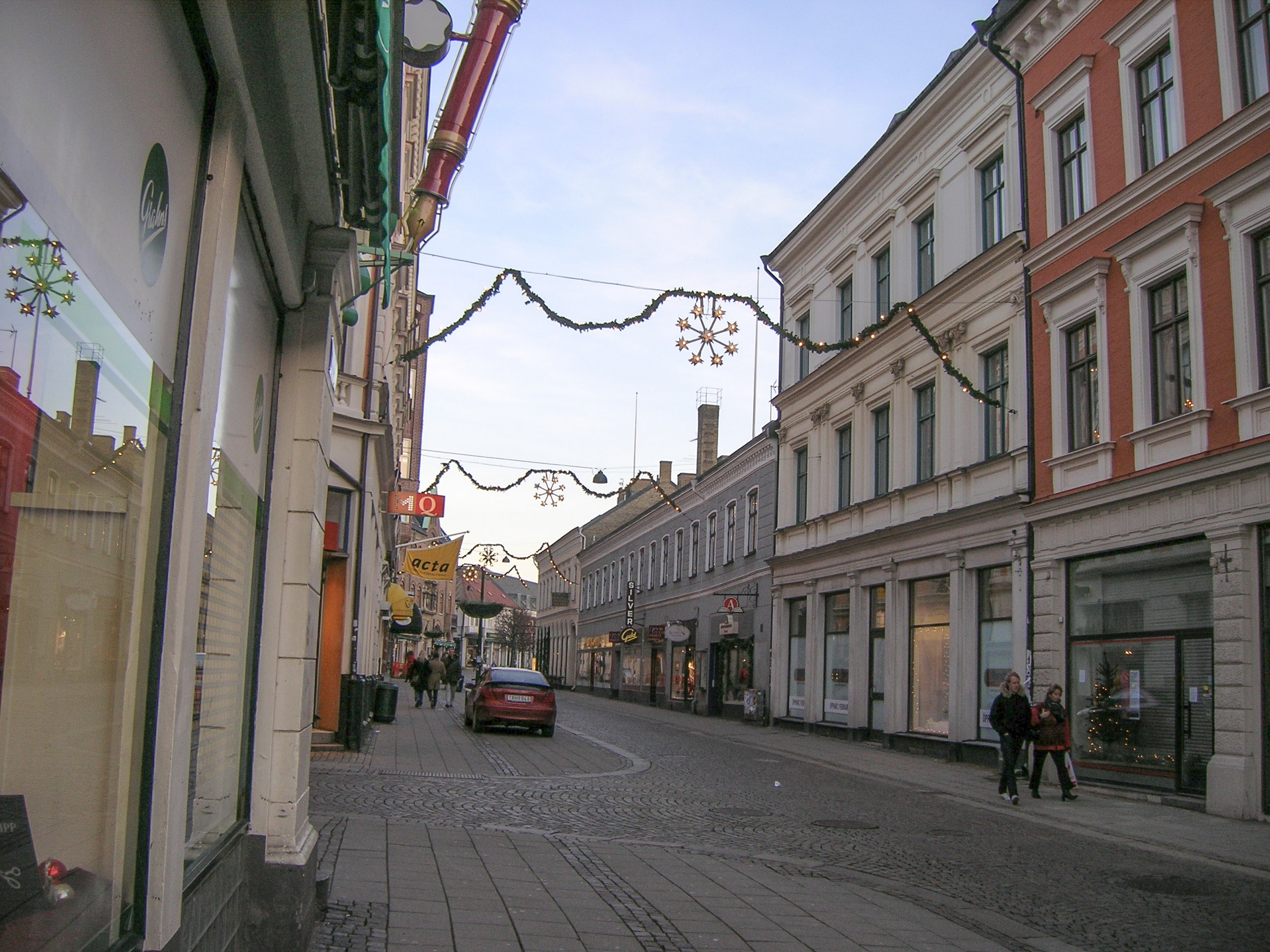
Lilla Fiskaregatan, the main pedestrian street in Lund.

Lund's population has grown steadily throughout the past century. In 2024, 23.5 percent of the municipality's residents were born outside Sweden. Approximately 35 percent of the inhabitants—and the share is rising—had a foreign background in 2024, meaning they were either born abroad themselves or born in Sweden to two foreign-born parents. If one also includes Swedish-born residents with one parent born outside Europe (a group that, based on national patterns, is estimated to account for around 5 percent of the population), the broader share of the population with ties to migration from outside Europe would reach approximately 40 percent. Students at Lund University make up a significant portion of the city's population.

Year	Population
1960	39,568
1965	45,043
1970	52,359
1975	55,047
1980	55,130
1990	62,909
1995	71,450
2000	73,840
2005	76,188
2010	82,476
2015	87,244
2018	91,940
2020	94,393
2024	approx. 96,000-98,000

Students at Lund University constitute a significant part of the city's population, influencing both demographic patterns and social structures. At the start of each term, the number of international students increases sharply; for example, approximately 700 newly arrived international students participated in the Spring Arrival Day 2025, marking the beginning of the term for many exchange and master’s students.

The large and rapidly fluctuating student population has been shown to be linked to challenges in housing provision in Lund. Despite extensive housing development, structural problems remain in meeting students' needs for affordable and long-term accommodation, particularly at the start of the academic term when demand is at its peak. A review by the Swedish National Union of Students and local commentators indicates that Lund is regularly flagged red in the national housing report for student cities, signaling that many students experience insecure access to housing and high rents relative to student financial aid.

These conditions may contribute to increased pressure on the local housing market and social infrastructure, as students often seek housing for shorter periods and compete for limited resources with both permanent residents and newly arrived groups.

== Governance ==
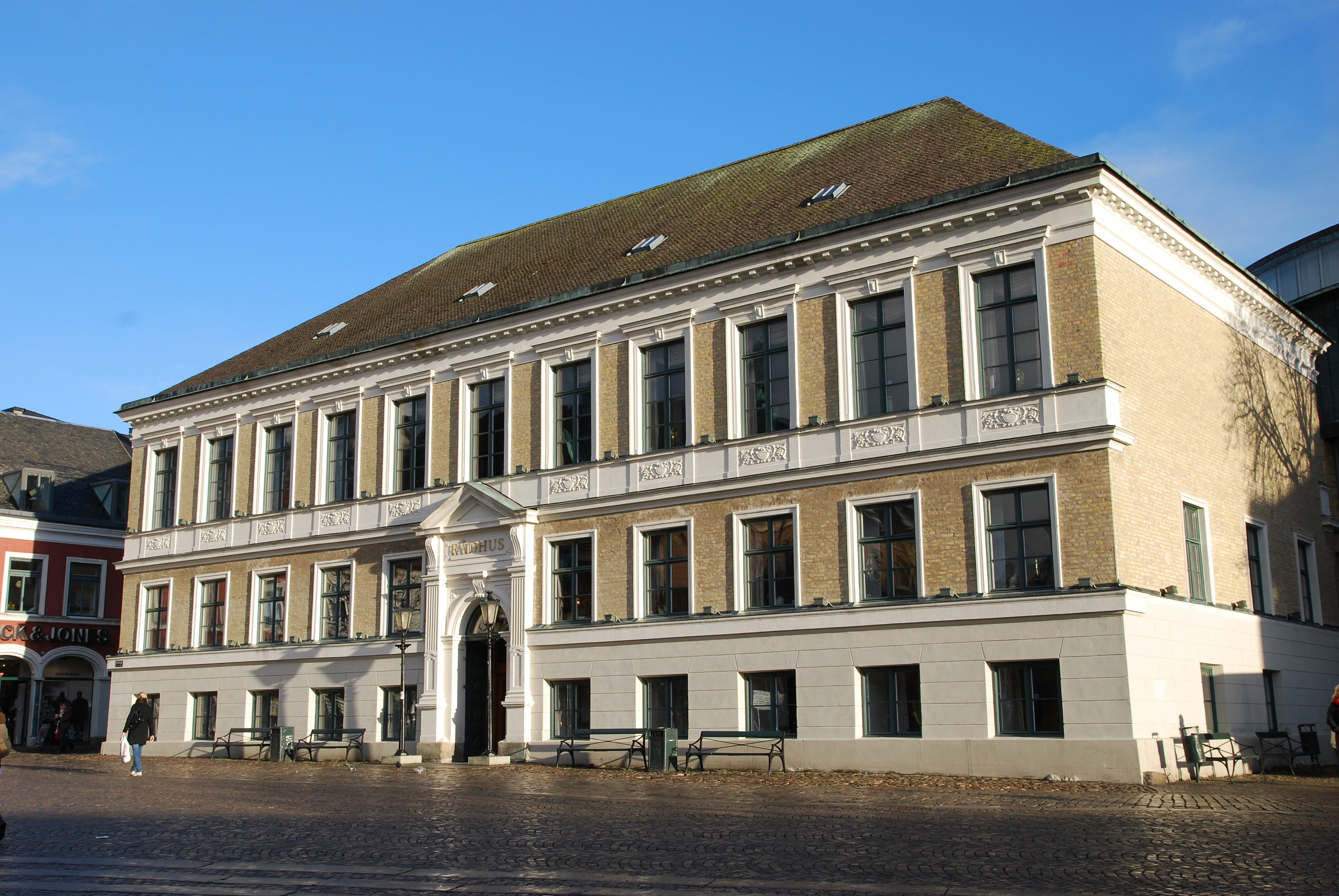
The old town hall (Lunds rådhus) on Stortorget square is used as offices by Lund Municipality.

Lund is governed by Lund Municipality. The municipality is responsible for the city of Lund, nearby settlements including Dalby, Södra Sandby and Veberöd, and the surrounding countryside. It reached its current form in 1974 following the absorption of a number of nearby municipalities. In 2014 the city itself was officially divided into 14 administrative divisions.

The municipality is governed by a municipal assembly (kommunfullmäktige) of 65 members, who elect a municipal executive committee (kommunstyrelse) of 13 members. Since October 2018 the mayor and chairman of the executive committee (kommunstyrelsens ordförande) has been Philip Sandberg of the Liberals.

== Education ==
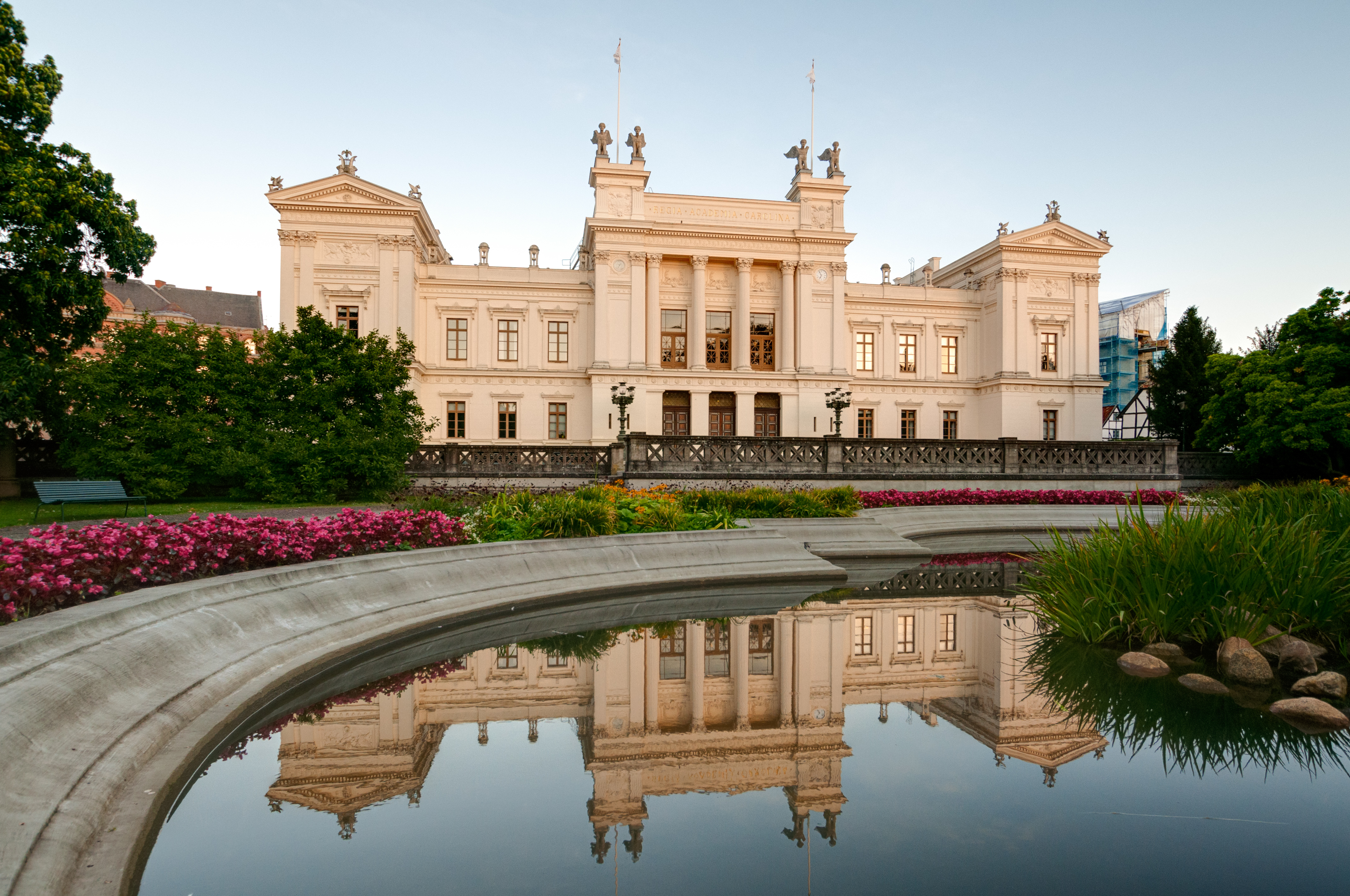
Lund University main building

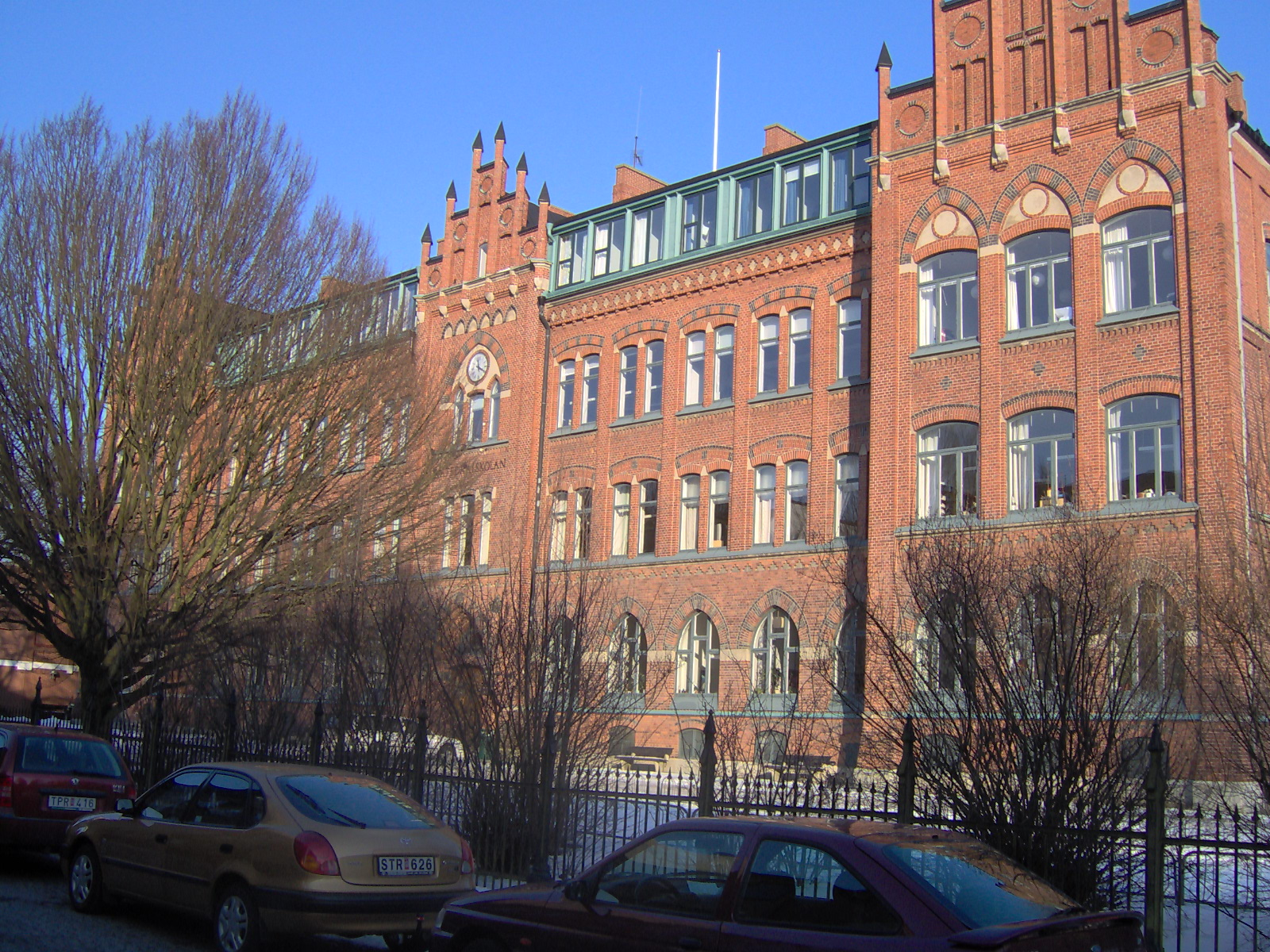
One of the buildings of Katedralskolan, Lund Cathedral school.

=== Lund University ===
The university dominates much of the centre of Lund. It was founded in 1666 following the transfer of Scania to Sweden under the Treaty of Roskilde and is the second-oldest university in Sweden after Uppsala University. Its traditional centre is in Lundagård park but stretches out towards the north east of the city where the large engineering faculty is located. Today, Lund University is one of northern Europe's largest, with eight faculties, 41,000 students and over 2,000 separate courses. It is and has consistently ranked in the world top 100 universities and is a member of the League of European Research Universities as well as the global Universitas 21 network.

=== Other educational institutions ===
Katedralskolan (Lund Cathedral School) founded in 1085, is the oldest school in Scandinavia. Today it is a high gymnasium with about 1,400 students studying in five different programmes.

Östervångskolan is a specialskola (special school) for deaf and hard of hearing students, providing education in Swedish and Swedish Sign Language. It accepts students from Skåne and surrounding areas. The school was founded in 1871 as Skånes Anstalt för Döfstumma i Lund (Skåne's Institute for the Deaf and Mute in Lund) and had its premises on Östervångsvägen until 2016 when it relocated to Tunaskolan. The International School of Lund Katedralskolan (ISLK) later moved to the Östervångsvägen site.

The Royal Swedish Physiographic Society is a learned society based in Lund.

== Culture ==
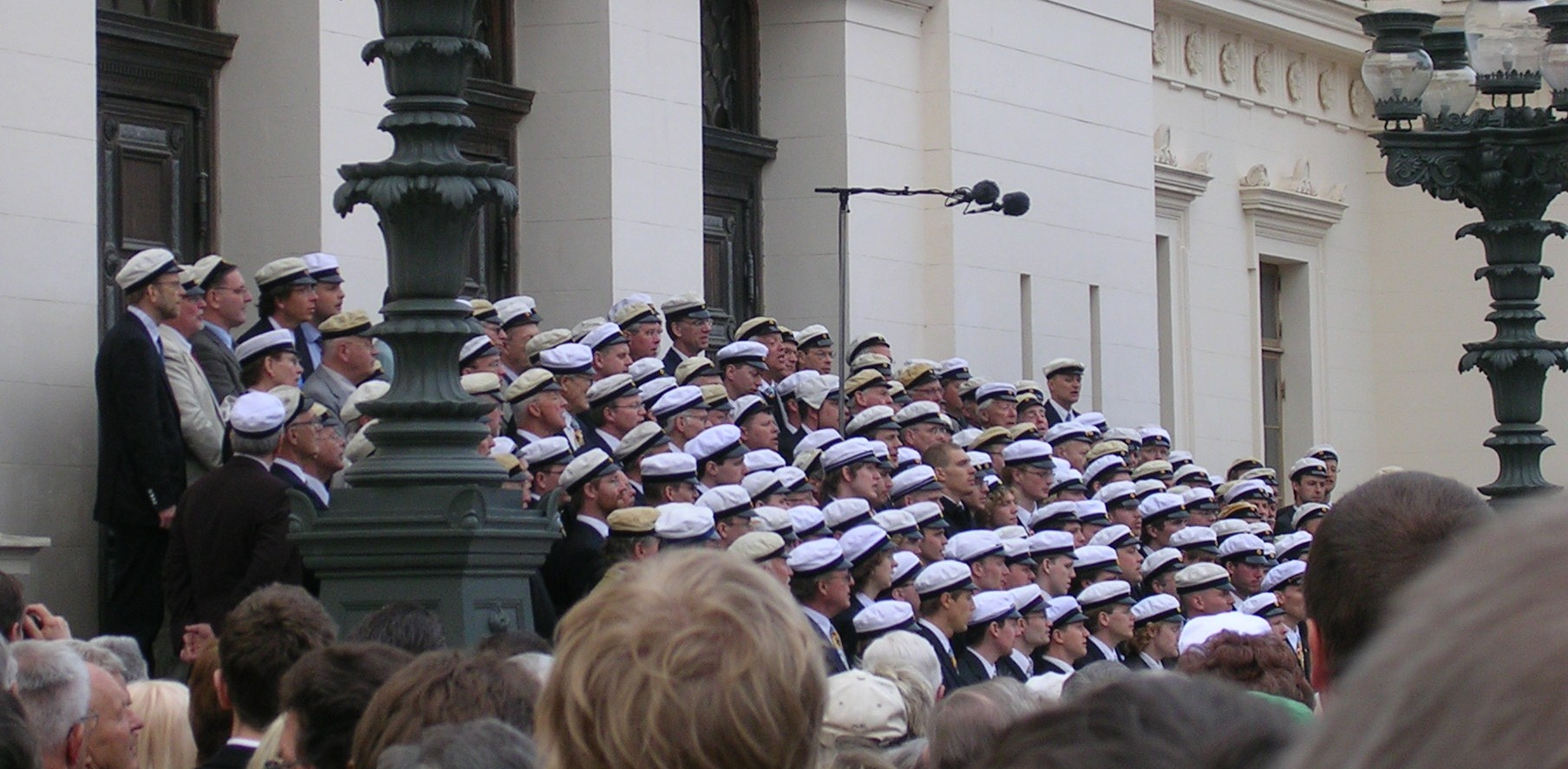
Lund University Male Voice Choir at the Lund University main building on 1 May 2005

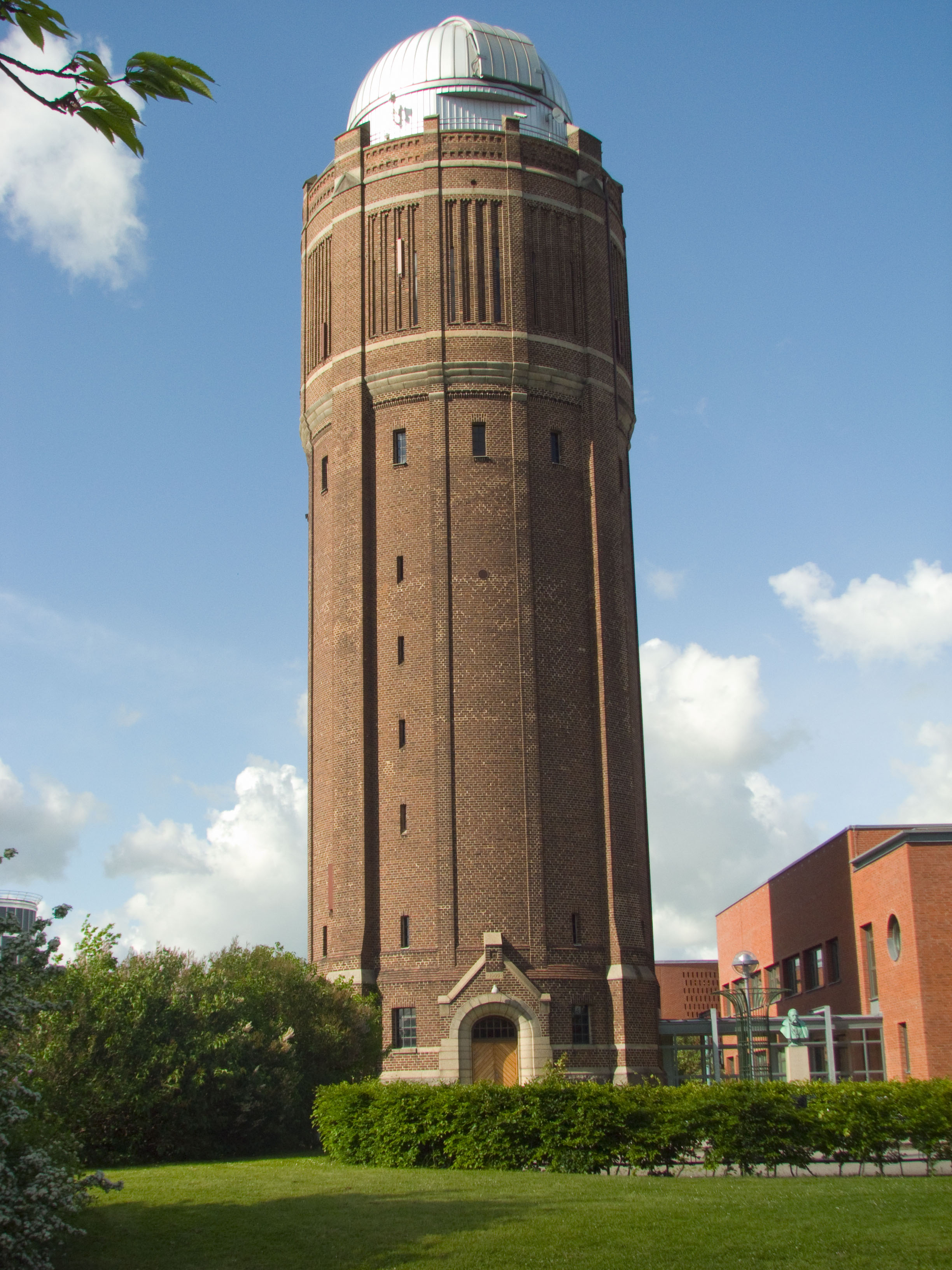
Lund University observatory

The culture in Lund is characterised by the university education and research, and the large student population, including 28% international students and student traditions, such as a student theatre group since 1886. A substantial part of the student night-life is located at student fraternities called 'Nations'.

Lund Cathedral, the former Catholic and the now Lutheran cathedral in Lund, is the seat of the bishop of Lund of the Church of Sweden. Lund also has a city theatre (though without a professional local ensemble of its own) and a number of other places for concerts and theatres.

=== Literature, theatre and cinema ===
Numerous prominent figures from the literary world lived and worked in Lund, often in association with the university and theatre. Prominent examples include Esias Tegnér, writer, poet and bishop, and August Strindberg, playwright, novelist and poet. A longer list is given below with other notable natives. The Lund novel is a genre in its own right, a bildungsroman in which a young student experiences life in Lund, Copenhagen and sometimes Österlen whilst maturing as an individual. The Lund novel is exemplified by the work of Fritiof Nilsson Piraten and Frank Heller.

The spex are a form of student theatre particular to Nordic universities, with a strong tradition in Lund. They are parodistic musical plays, often setting well-known music to new lyrics and mixing up the historical and the present in unconventional intrigues. Comedians Hans Alfredson and Anders Jansson started their careers in the Lund spex.

The concluding scenes in Ingmar Bergman's classic film Wild Strawberries are set in Lund.

The Lund International Architecture Film Festival is held annually in the autumn.

Lund joined the UNESCO Creative Cities Network and was named a UNESCO City of Literature in October 2025. Lund became the second Swedish literature city after Gothenburg. The city promotes young people from the university in field of literature and hosts annually "Litteralund", the largest festival in Sweden for child literature.

=== Museums ===
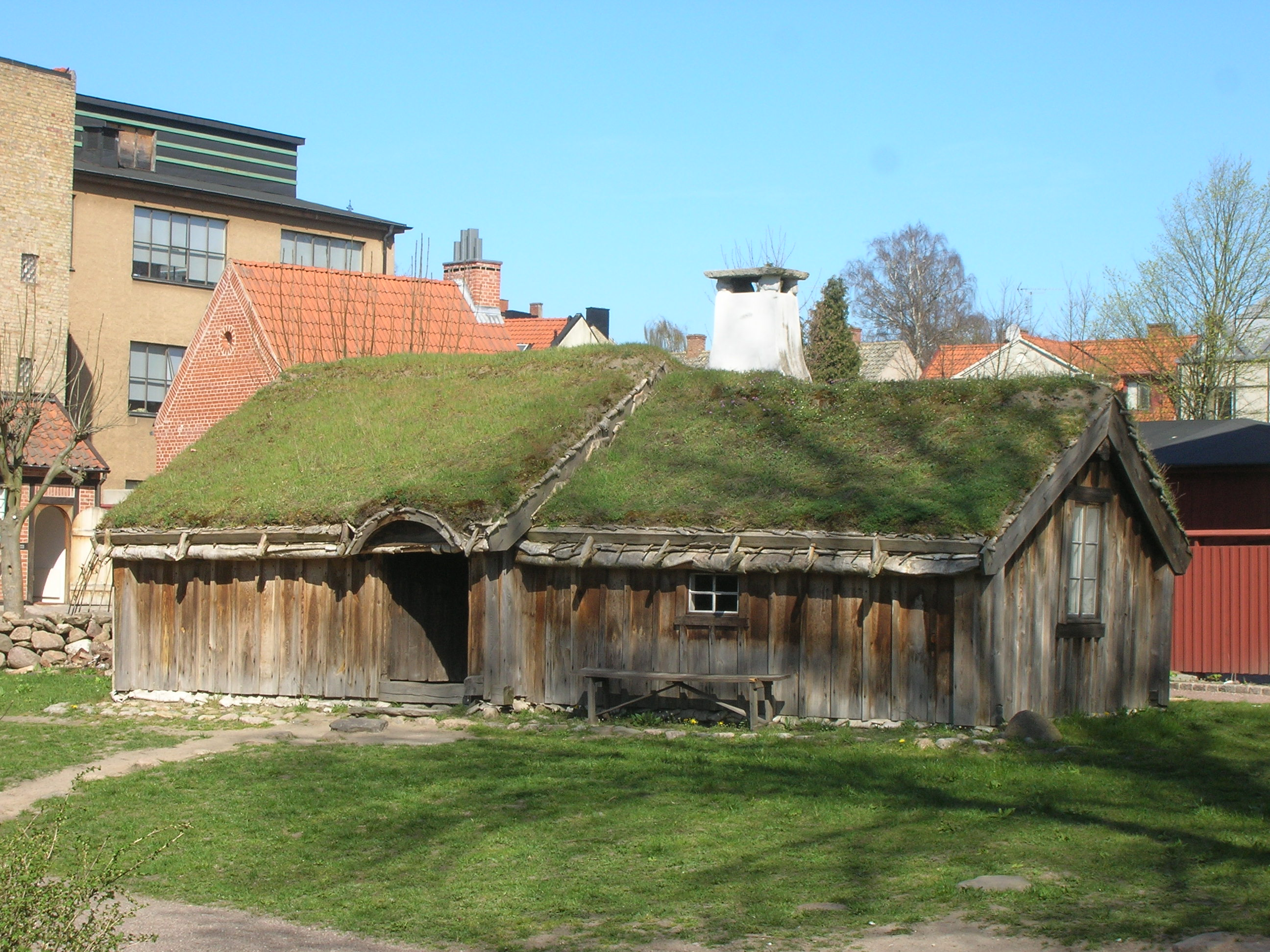
The Bosmåla cottage is part of the open-air museum Kulturen, which hosts a collection of historical Scanian buildings.

Lund hosts the largest open-air museum of Scania, Kulturen. Kulturen is the second oldest dedicated open-air museum in the world. Founded in 1892 by Georg Karlin, it consists of more than 30 buildings, as well as collections exhibiting Scanian art, crafts, local archaeology and history.

Several museums are attached to the university. The Historical Museum at Lund University is based in the Lundagård park. Its exhibitions were updated in 2018 and cover the history, archeology and zoology of Scania. There is a separate Lund Cathedral museum. The Museum of Sketches for Public Art is a unique museum that documents the development of public artworks. The Vattenhallen Science Center, connected to the university's engineering faculty, has an interactive presentation of science and research.

=== Lundakarnevalen ===
Lundakarnevalen has been held every four years since the mid-nineteenth century; anecdotal accounts reference its beginnings to a wedding in 1849 (the four-year intervals place the party in 2002, 2006, 2010, etc.). Arranged by the students of the university, from the 1950s onwards the event has grown in size and intensity (with some 5,500 volunteers 2010), but it remains an amateur event. Midway between a music and stage fair, a city festival, and an outpouring of satire, parody and general madness. Some students dress up in costumes, often relating to and poking fun at current issues, and parade in wagons. Others perform humorous skits in the evenings. The carnival revues and other stage entertainments have launched a number of well-known entertainers and actors over the years.

=== Music ===
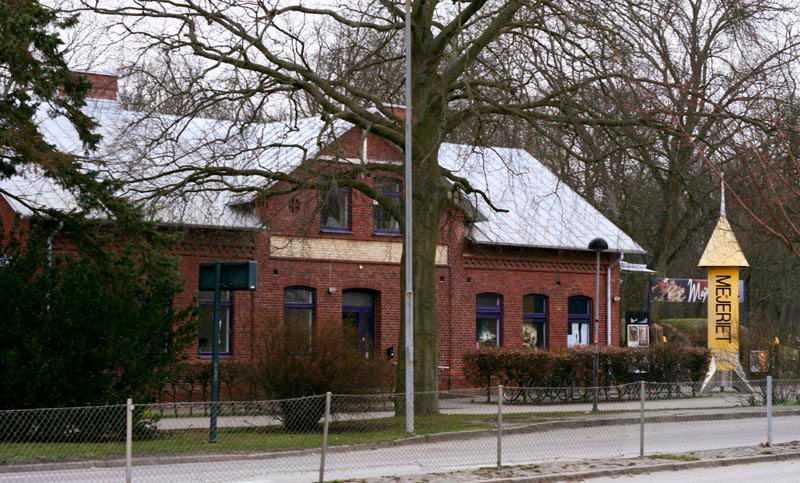
Lund's cultural venue, Mejeriet

Lund has long been a regional centre for classical and church music. In particular, Lund is renowned for its vibrant amateur choir scene, with choirs such as Carolinae damkör, Domkyrkokören, Katedralkören, Lunds akademiska kör, Lund Chamber Choir (Swedish: Lunds Kammarkör), Lunds Studentsångförening, Lunds vokalensemble, and the Svanholm Singers. Since 2006, Lund has been the host of the biannual Lund International Choral Festival. Classical orchestras based in the city include the Lund City Orchestra, the Academic Orchestra and Lund New Chamber Orchestra.

In more recent decades, Lund has also developed a lively pop and jazz scene. The cultural venue Mejeriet opened in 1987 in a former dairy building just outside the city park. It has hosted concerts by both well-known and emerging bands. The pop singer and television presenter Måns Zelmerlöw was born and grew up in Lund. Artists associated with Lund include DJ and record producer Axwell, rock musician Kal P. Dal, rapper Timbuktu, indie pop group The Radio Dept., and singer and songwriter Amanda Jenssen. The music venue Olympen, hosted many famous artists from 1971 to 2009.

=== Sports ===
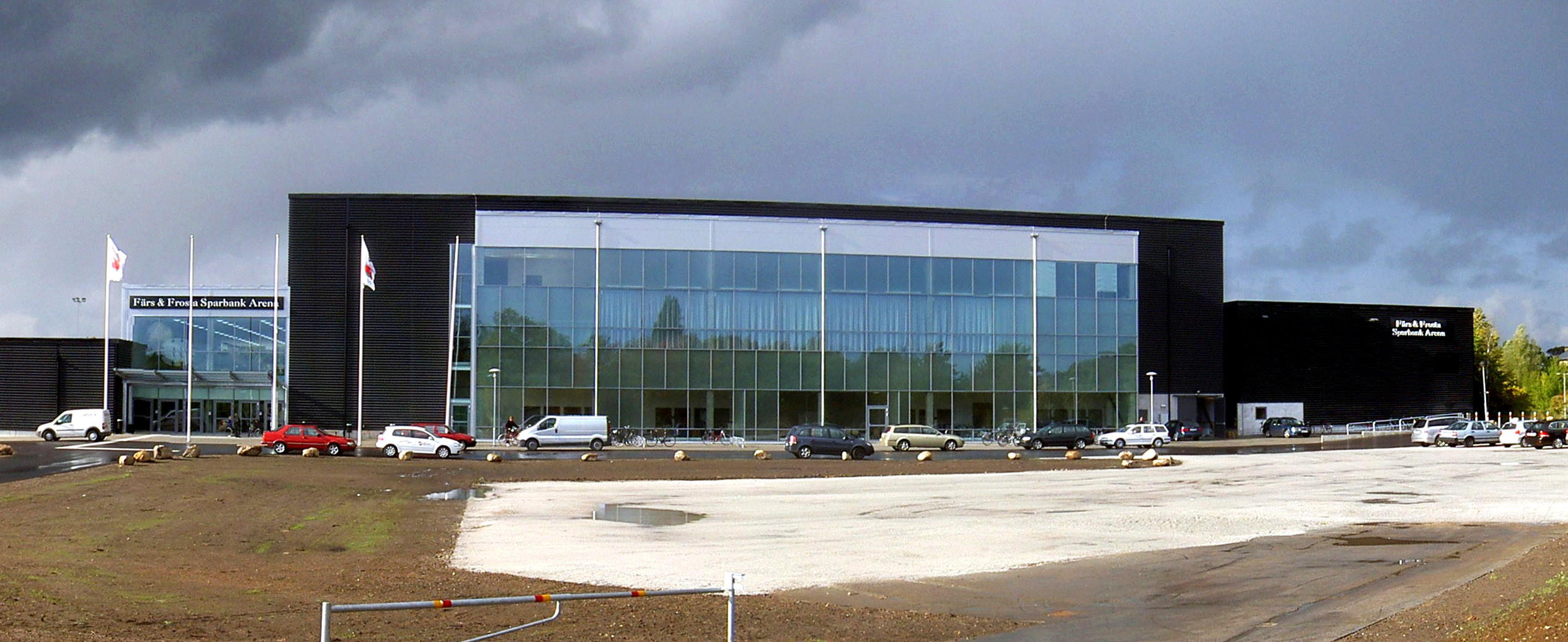
The Sparbanken Skåne Arena is a large sports hall adjoining the city park in Lund. Until 2014 it was known as the Färs och Frosta Sparbank Arena.

Lund's handball team, LUGI HF has played in both the men's and women's top leagues. Lund hosted matches from the 2011 Handball World Championship in the Sparbanken Skåne Arena. Lund has a chess team, Lunds ASK, that for decades has been among the top teams in Sweden. Lund has two Division 1 football clubs, Torns IF and Lunds BK. It is also the birthplace of the online football manager game Hattrick. Lugi Rugbyklubb, based in Lund, is one of Sweden's few rugby clubs. Lund has a boxing association called Lunds Boxningssällskap.

== Transport ==
=== Railways ===
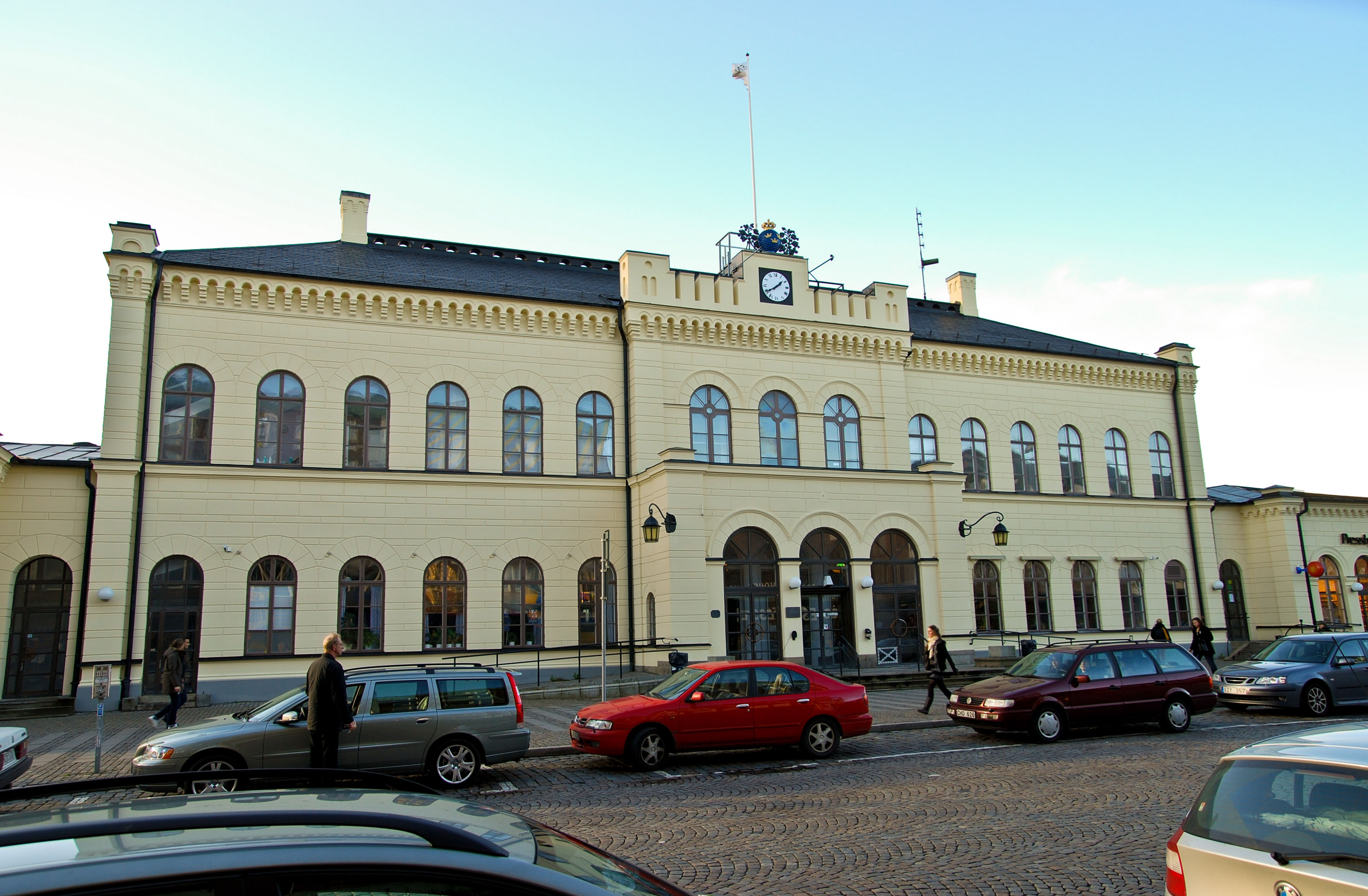
Lund railway station

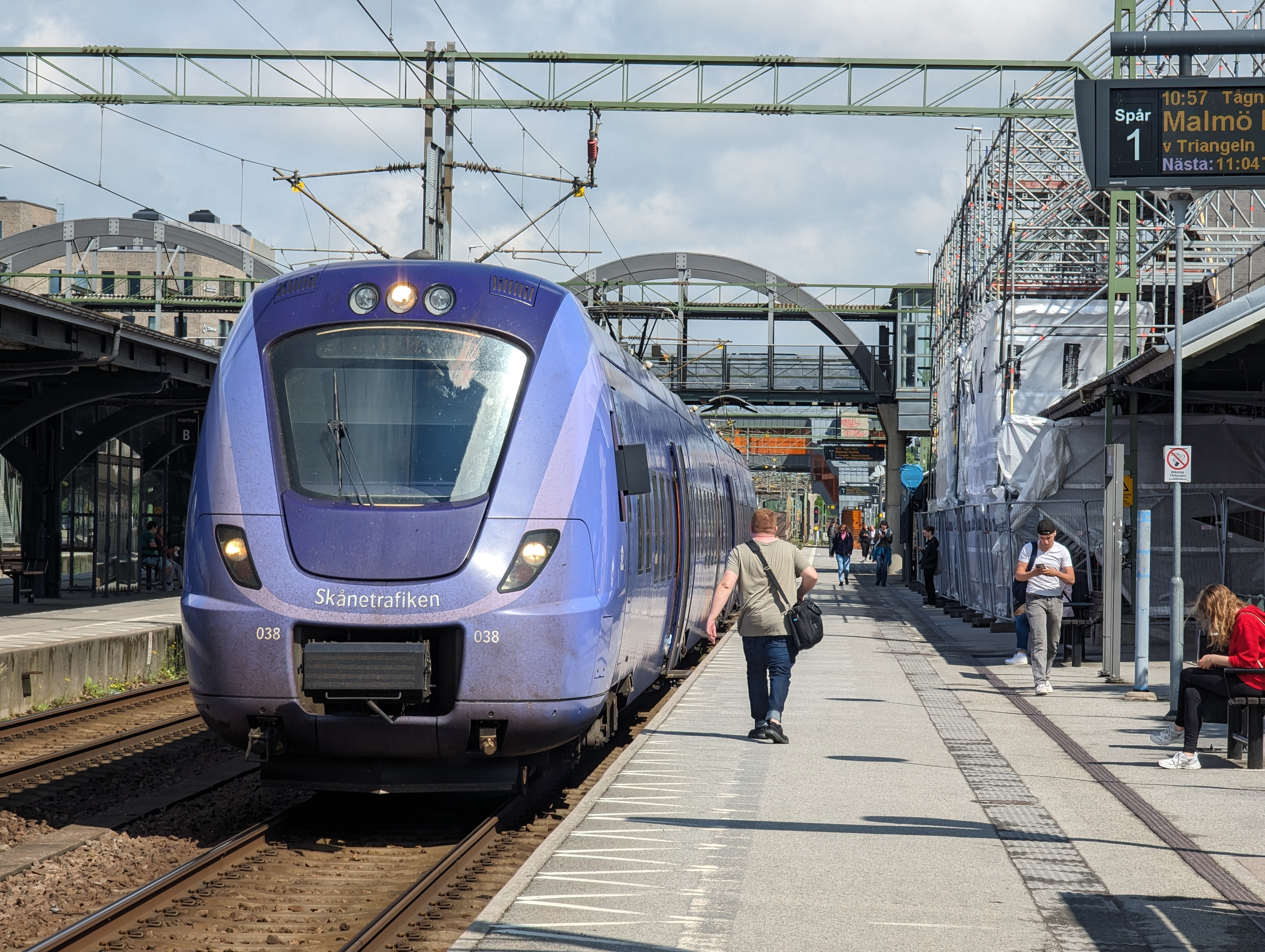
A Skånetrafiken X61 train at Lund railway station

Lund is a railway junction and is well served by rail traffic. The main railway station, Lund Central, is Sweden's third busiest railway station, with around 37 000 passengers per day as of 2013. Another, smaller station serves the suburb of Gunnesbo in the north-west of the city. Lund has been on the Southern Main Line, which connects Malmö and Stockholm, since it opened in 1856. The West Coast Line to Gothenburg branches off the Southern Main Line just north of Lund Central station. Thus there are direct services to all of Sweden's three largest cities, as well as to Copenhagen and Helsingør via the Öresund Bridge. Rail services to Denmark, and within Scania and neighbouring counties, are mainly provided by the Øresundståg. These trains are operated jointly by Skånetrafiken in Scania and the Danish State Railways in Denmark. Longer distance services, notably to Stockholm, are provided by SJ. Local traffic is served by the Pågatåg electric multiple units, which provide stopping services within Scania.

=== Cycling ===
Lund has been praised for its cycling infrastructure. There are 4,800 bike parking spaces in the town, including a multi-storey facility at the railway station, over 260 km (162 mi) of cyclepaths and cycle lanes, and 43% of journeys within the city take place by bicycle. There has been no increase in car usage for the past 10 years.

=== Buses ===
Since 2019, the bus network in Lund has been licensed to the company Vy Buss, overseen by Skånetrafiken. They operate green-coloured buses which are electric. The buses run on a total of seven bus lines. A survey carried out on behalf of Region Skåne in 2015 found that 11% of Lund residents used the bus network regularly.

=== Tramway ===
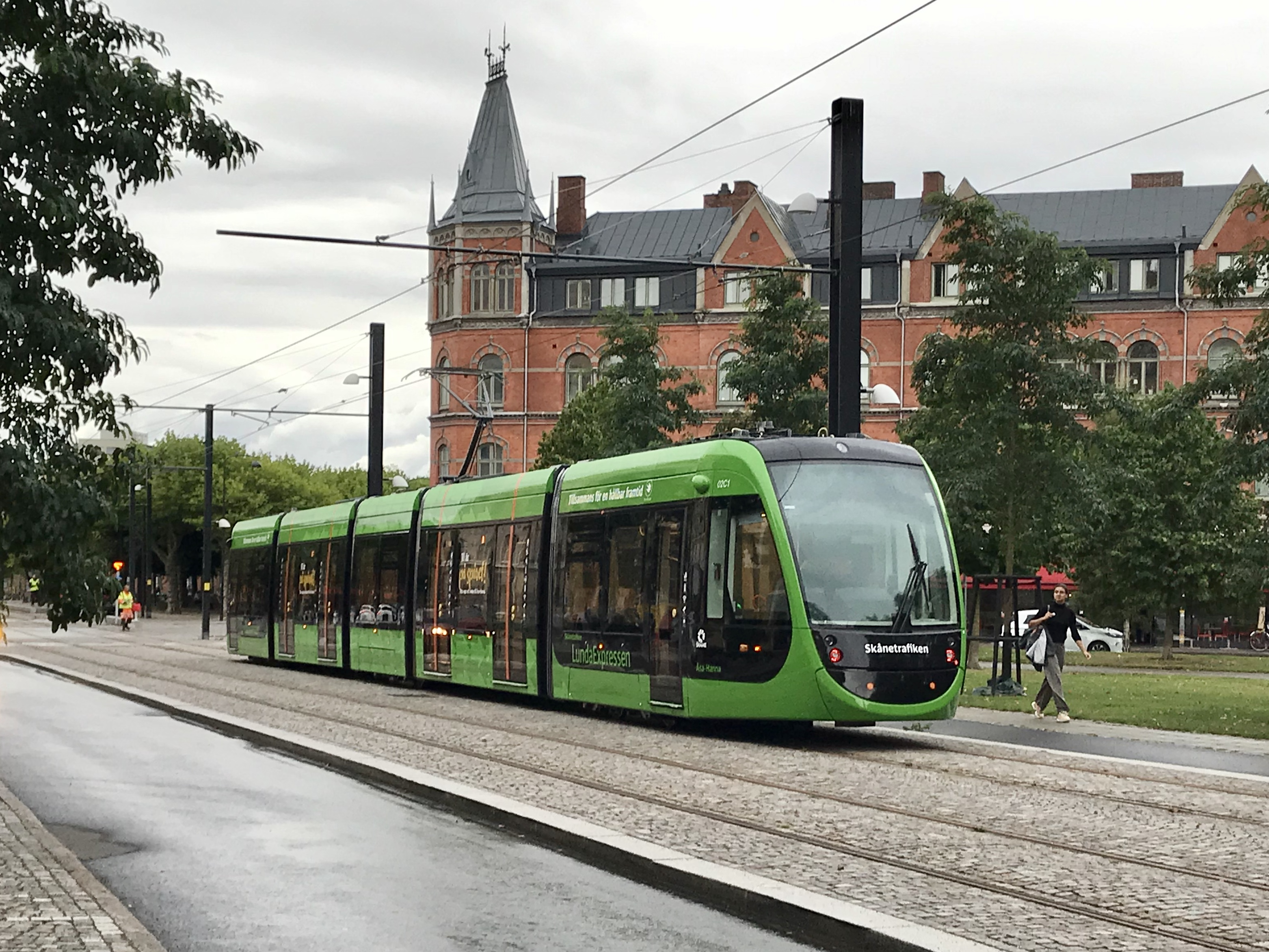
A tram on Lund's tramway.

The Lund Tramway opened to the public on December 13, 2020. Plans were approved in 2015 to initiate a 6 km (3.7 mi) tram network to provide faster and higher-capacity commuter transport in central Lund. The 15-minute tram ride connects Lund Central Station with the hospital, Lund University (LTH), Ideon Science Park, the new district of Brunnshög, the MAX IV synchrotron light source, and the European Spallation Source.

Long-term plans to extend this network to the suburban towns of Bjärred (via Öresundsvägen), Dalby, Staffanstorp and Södra Sandby have been shelved.

=== Major roads ===
Lund has been connected to the motorway network since 1953 when the E22 was opened between Lund and Malmö. The E22 was the first motorway in Sweden, and was originally built around the edge of the town; however following the expansion of the suburbs out to the east in the latter half of the 20th century it now passes through the city. The E22 forms the main north-south trunk route through Lund. The largest east-west road is the multi-lane northern ring road which also passes through the city limits. There are also other connections to most major roads in the area, for example the E6 via Riksväg 16, and the Länsväg 108 which connects to the E65.

=== Airports ===
Lund is served by Copenhagen Airport, the largest airport in the Nordic countries, which can be reached by frequent direct trains in about 35 minutes. The second airport in the area, Malmö Airport, is located about 26 kilometres (16 miles) away and is mainly used for domestic flights. There was a small airstrip, Hasslanda Flygfält, to the south of Lund, primarily used for private and charter flights; the airstrip closed in 2008.

== Economy ==
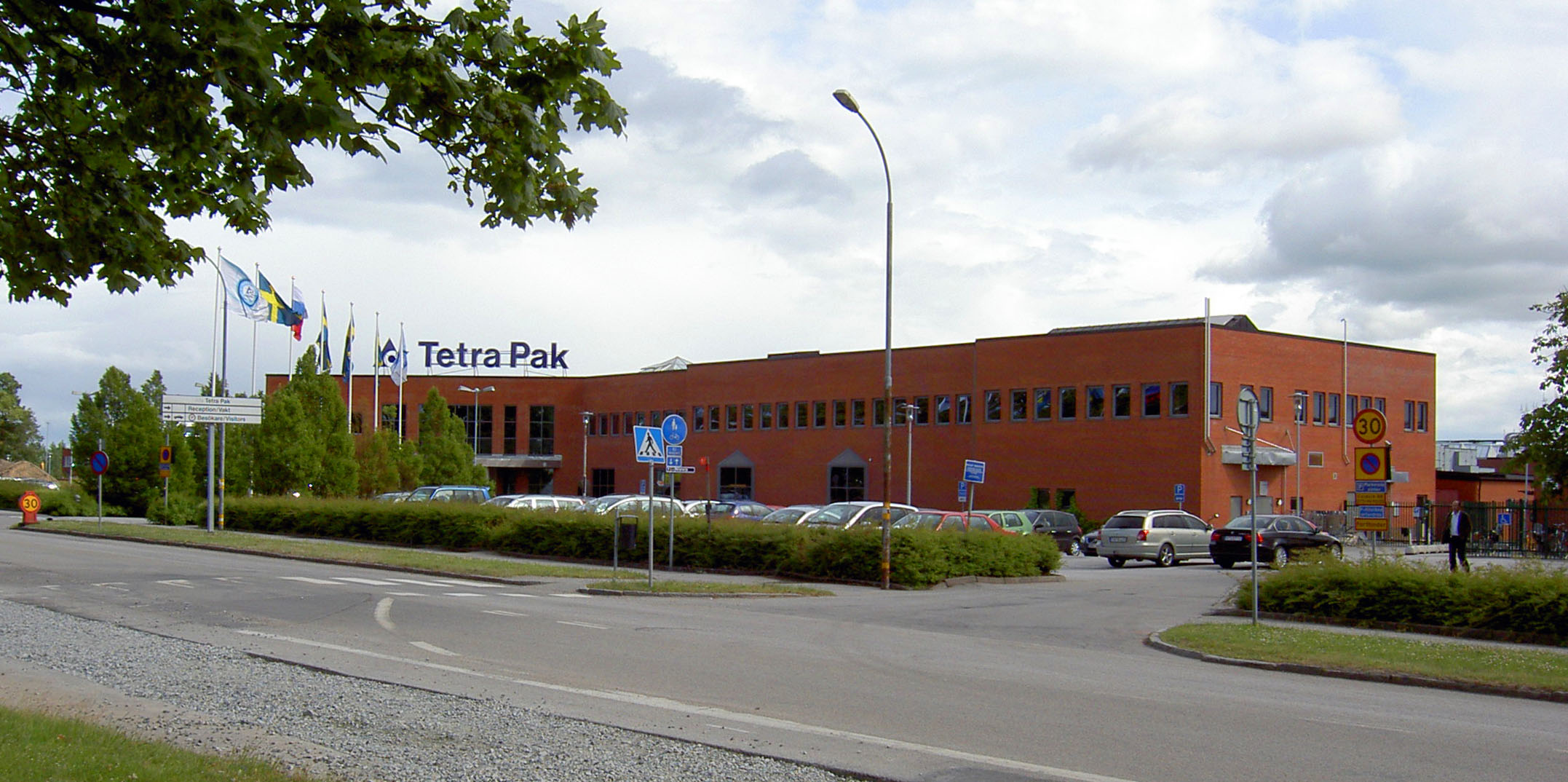
The main factory building of Tetra Pak, located in the south of Lund.

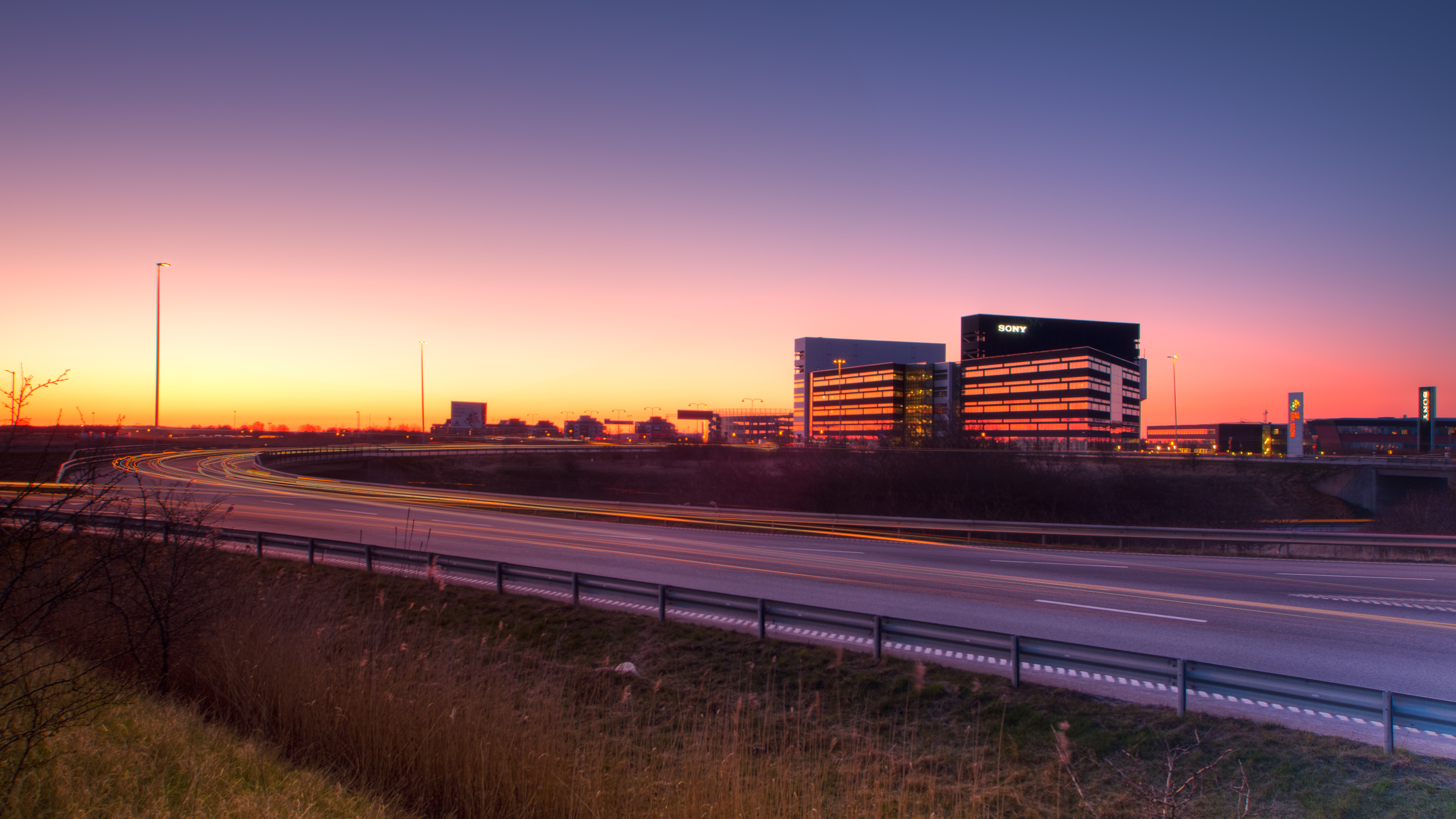
Sony Mobile offices in Lund

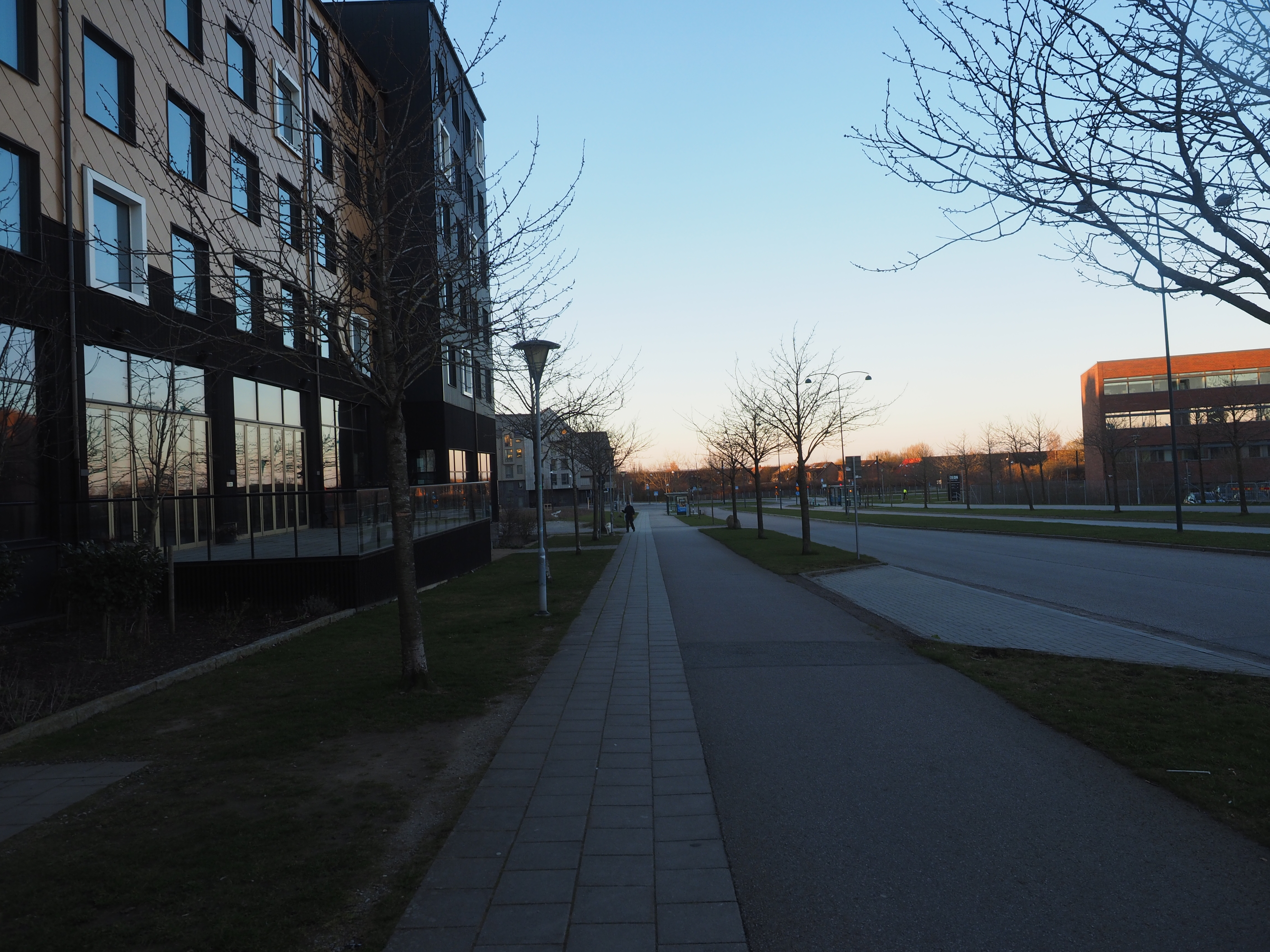
Telefongatan near the Ideon Science Park

Lund is a regional centre for high tech companies, several of which are based in the north-east of the city. Companies with offices in Lund include Sony Mobile Communications, Ericsson, Arm Holdings, and Microsoft. The Swedish telecommunications company Doro has its head office in Lund. Gambro, one of the key companies in the development of the artificial kidney, was founded in Lund in 1964 and retains a significant presence in the city. Alfa Laval, the international manufacturer of heat exchangers and separators, have a factory in Lund, and Tetra Pak have their headquarters and part of production in town. Network video camera maker Axis Communications was founded in Lund in 1984 and maintains its headquarters in the city as an independently operated subsidiary of Canon. Other important industries include pharmaceuticals, biotechnology, and publishing and library services.

Skåne University Hospital and Lund University are major employers, with extensive research facilities. In particular, the Lund Institute of Technology has connections with the high tech industry in the city. A science park, Ideon Science Park, was founded in 1983 as a collaboration between Lund University, Lund Municipality and Wihlborgs Fastigheter AB. As of 2016 it hosts about 350 companies, employing 2,700 people. Many of these are high tech companies that have ties to the university.

The 2010s have seen the development of two major research facilities in Lund, both in collaboration with the university. MAX IV is the world's most brilliant synchrotron light source and a Swedish national facility. It was inaugurated on 21 June 2016. The European Spallation Source (ESS) is a pulsed neutron source under construction on a site just north of MAX IV. ESS is expected to directly employ about 450 people when it is completed in around 2023.

Tetra Pak was founded in Lund in 1951 by Ruben Rausing. Their principal product is packages and equipment for aseptic packaging of food, principally using plastic-coated cardboard. As of January 2015 Tetra Pak employed around 3,500 staff at their headquarters in Lund.

The pharmaceutical company AstraZeneca used to have a large presence in Lund but their offices closed in 2010. The site was re-developed as a research park named Medicon Village. As of 2016 over 1,200 people worked in more than 100 organisations based at Medicon Village.

== Notable residents ==
- Axwell, professional DJ
- Rolf-Göran Bengtsson, Olympic equestrian
- Martin Dahlin, footballer
- Timbuktu (Jason Diakité), hip-hop and reggae artist
- Kim Ekdahl du Rietz, handball player
- Joel Ekstrand, footballer
- Olle Hagnell (1924–2011), psychiatrist and professor
- Mikael Håfström, film writer and director
- Anders Jansson, comedian
- Amanda Jenssen, singer
- Joachim Johansson, tennis player
- Helena Josefsson, singer
- Niklas Krog, novelist (young adult books)
- Nils Grandelius, chess grandmaster
- Isabelle Haak, volleyball player
- Indrek Martinson (1937–2009), Estonian-born physicist
- Albert Levan (1905–1998), botanist and geneticist
- Cecilia Lindqvist (1932–2021), Sinologist
- Roger Ljung, footballer
- Jan Malmsjö, actor
- Beata Mårtensson-Brummer (1889–1956), painter, ceramist
- Lukas Moodysson, film writer, director
- Otto Andreas Lowson Mörch (1828–1878), zoologist
- Johann Christoph Muhrbeck (1733–1805), philosopher
- Andreas Palicka, handball player
- Gösta Pettersson (born 1937), biochemist
- Ivo Pekalski, footballer
- The Radio Dept., band
- Ola Svensson, pop singer
- Max von Sydow, actor
- Linus Thörnblad, Olympic high jumper
- Johan Wester, comedian
- Elin Wägner, feminist writer
- Rolf Edling, Olympic fencer
- Måns Zelmerlöw, pop singer and winner of Eurovision Song Contest 2015.

=== Literary residents ===
- Brita Egardt (1916–1990), ethnologist, folklorist
- Vilhelm Ekelund, poet
- Hjalmar Gullberg, writer, poet and translator
- Britt G. Hallqvist, writer, poet and translator
- Ola Hansson, writer, poet and critic
- Albert Kivikas, Estonian-born writer and journalist
- Bengt Lidforss, natural scientist and writer
- Carl Linnaeus (1707–1778), scientist and author
- Vladimir Oravsky author and film director
- Anders Österling, writer, poet, translator and critic
- Lars Norén, poet and playwright
- Göran Sonnevi, poet and translator
- August Strindberg, playwright
- Esaias Tegnér, writer and bishop
- Nils Runeberg (fictional), character of Jorge Luis Borges' Three Versions of Judas

== See also ==
- Lund Principle, an important principle in ecumenical relations between Christian churches.
- Uppsala
- All Saints Abbey, Lund
- Östra Torn
