= Lund Chamber Choir =

The Lund Chamber Choir (Swedish: Lunds Kammarkör) is a mixed choir from Lund, Sweden. The choir was founded by Eva Svanholm Bohlin in 1983 and she remained the choir's conductor until 2003. Between 2004 and 2011 the choir was led by Håkan Olsson Reising; in 2011 Daniel Åberg was elected as the new conductor of the Lund Chamber Choir. For a long time, the choir was associated to the Cathedral School of Lund, but is independent today. It is used as a representation choir at the Lund Cathedral.

Most often, the Lund Chamber Choir performs a cappella, and the repertoire comprises music from the Renaissance to the present. However, it has also performed orchestral choir works such as Mozart's Requiem and Handel's Messiah. The latter was given in 2009 at Holy Trinity Sloane Street in London together with soloists and orchestra from the Guildhall School of Music and Drama.

The choir has toured in Europe, Asia, and the United States of America and has successfully participated in several choir competitions. During recent years, the Lund Chamber Choir has given concerts e.g. at the American Choral Directors Association's Convention in Saint Louis in 2006, in Stockholm in 2007, Torrevieja in Spain in 2009, and Oxford and London in 2009.

== Recordings ==
- Nu stige jublets ton (Swedish Christmas music) (1997)
- La luna asoma
- I Afrodites trädgård (2008)

== Sources ==
- The website of Lund Chamber Choir
