= Universitetshuset =

Universitetshuset may refer to the following university buildings in Sweden:

- Universitetshuset at Uppsala University, see University Hall (Uppsala University)
- Universitetshuset at Lund University, see Lund University Main Building
- The main building of Umeå University
