= Radio UPF =

Swedish student radio show

Radio UPF is a Swedish student radio show, aired bi-weekly on Thursdays 5pm on Radio AF, the student radio station of Lund University. The show is made by the Association of Foreign Affairs in Lund (also known as UPF Lund) and focuses on foreign relations and international politics.

The show has been awarded the Swedish Radioakademin's grand prize for "best local radio" in 2006, 2007 and 2010.
