= Katedralskolan, Lund =

Lund Cathedral School
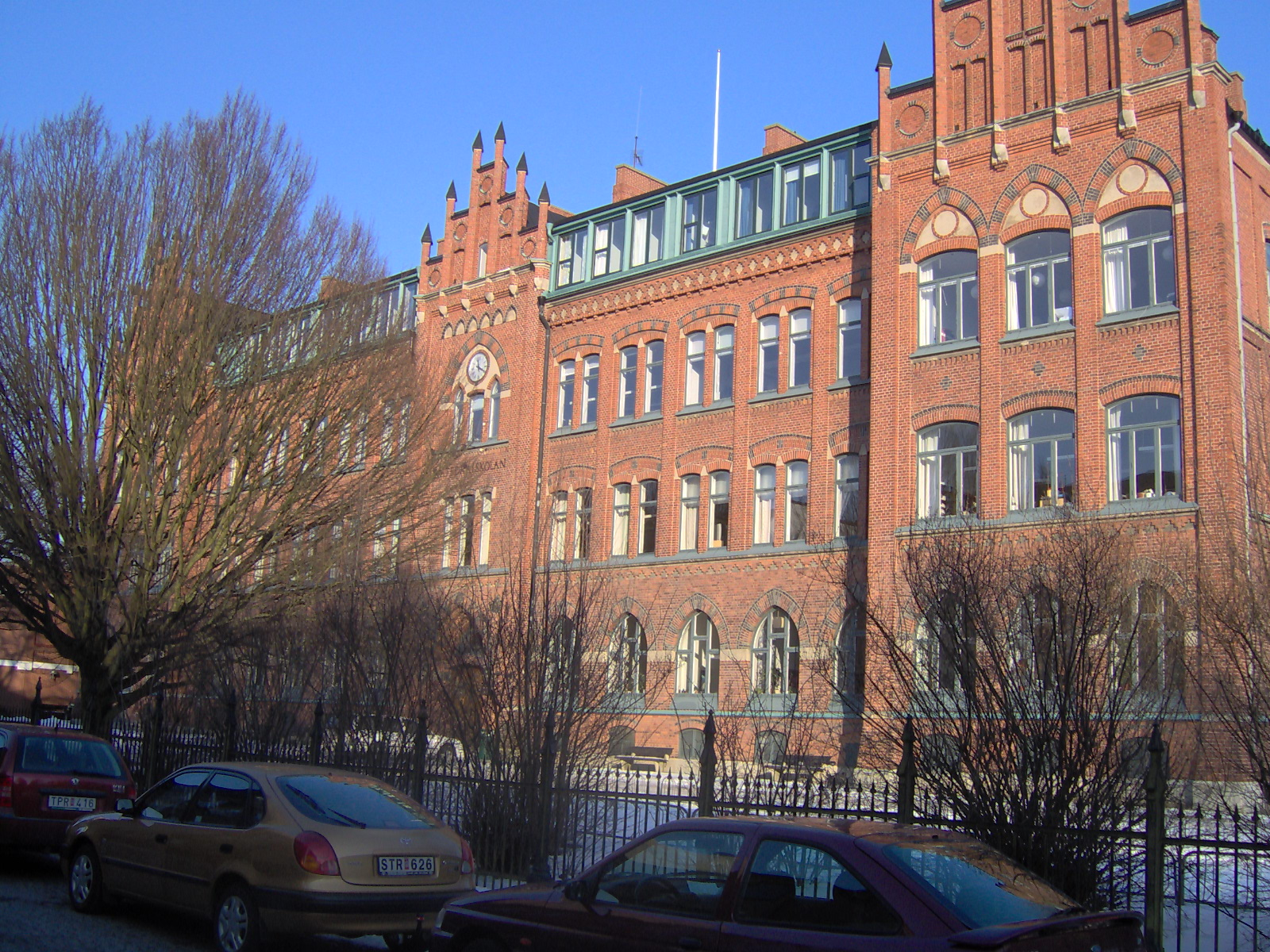
- Lund, Scania; Sweden

Information
- Type: Public
- Established: 1085 AD
- School district: Lund, Scania
- Head of school: Johan Pålsson
- Staff: 50
- Faculty: 100
- Grades: 10-12
- Enrollment: 1450
- Website: Link

Katedralskolan (Lund Cathedral School) is a school in Lund, Sweden, which was founded in 1085 by the Danish king Canute the Saint. It is the oldest school in Scandinavia and one of the oldest schools in Northern Europe. As with all upper secondary schools in Sweden, an application is required for admittance and it is considered one of the toughest schools to get accepted to in Lund.

== History ==
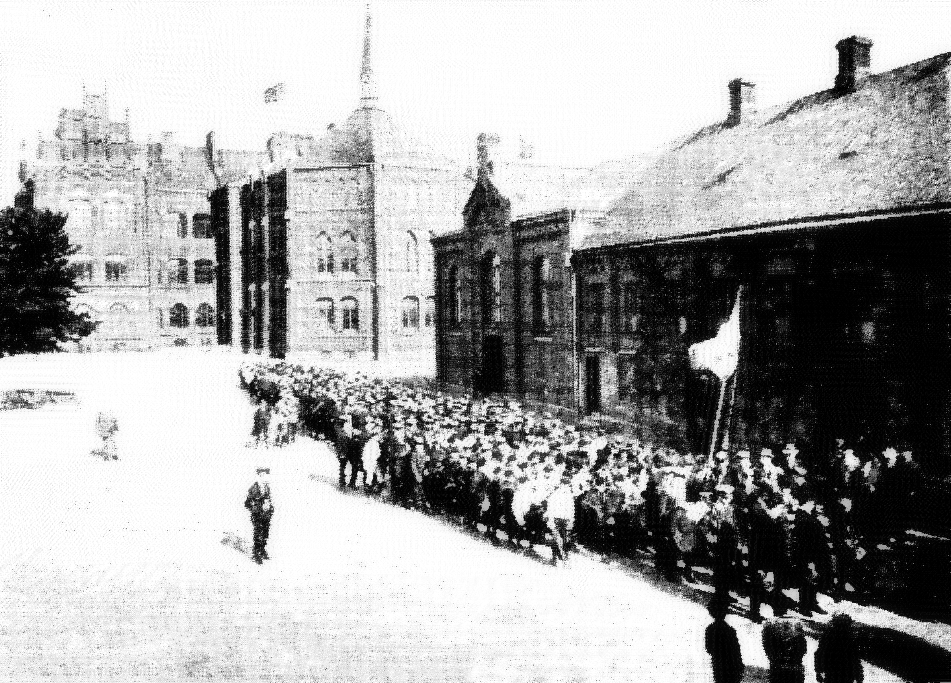
The Cathedral School in 1912.

The school was founded by a donation from the Danish king Canute the Saint. In the beginning, it was most likely a cathedral school, a seminary for the training of priests and other clergy within the church. Its clerical roots are also the origin of the school's name. During the Scanian Wars and the transition to Swedish rule, the school was for a while reduced to an insignificant elementary school with just two classes. For the first 750 years of its existence, the school was located directly adjacent to the Cathedral in Lund. However, in 1837, the school acquired Viffertska gården, which has been considered one of the most prestigious buildings in Lund since the 16th century. For two years at the beginning of the 18th century, the Swedish king Charles XII had his residence there.

Despite many wars and several transitions between Danish and Swedish rule, the school has maintained some form of teaching continuously since it was founded in 1085.

== Today ==
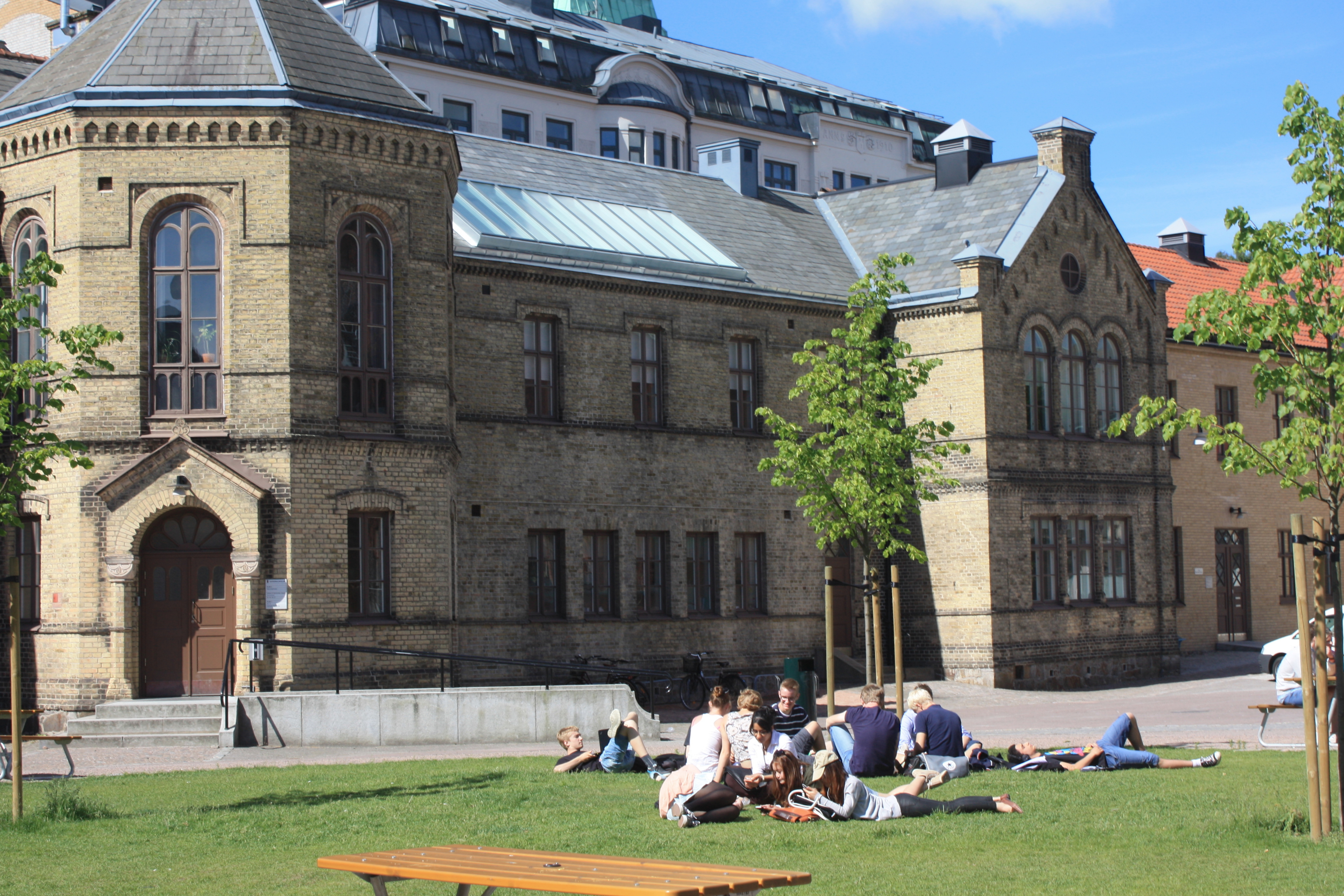
Students in the school's inner court

Today, the Cathedral School is an Upper Secondary School, or gymnasium, with about 1500 students attending five different programmes; the Science Programme (Naturvetenskapsprogrammet), the Social Science Programme (Samhällsvetenskapsprogrammet), the Economy Programme (Ekonomiprogrammet), the IB Diploma Programme and the History programme.

The History Programme was instituted in 2009 as a part of a government initiative to instate special programmes in theoretical subjects in selected schools in the country. It is the only History programme in Sweden. As of now, it is offered as a special variant of the Social Science programme (Spetsutbildning i Historia). The programme operates with a close connection to Lund university, as it includes university courses and feedback from proffersors at the university during the third year of studies.

The Cathedral School currently resides in six buildings; The main building, The Charles XII house, The Brunius house, The Svanegatshouse, Cathedral School West and the Svane School. Several currently well-known people have attended it, among whom are actor Max von Sydow and several high-ranking politicians. Among the famous students are Swedish sport stars Max Salminen and Henrik Stenson.

== Student Societies ==
There are a number of Student Societies in the school, the two most venerable ones being the theatre association Scenia (a word game alluding to 'wikt:scene' and the Latin name of the province of Lund, Scania) and the photographic society Asarna (a similar word game alluding to Norse mythology and to the ASA standard for analogue photography).

Scenia was started in 1945 by a group of students, including the later famous actor Max von Sydow. The drama group arranged and performed a variety of different Swedish plays and it became a tradition that passed on to younger students after graduation. Scenia was active throughout the 1950s but was then laid on ice until it was reborn as Katterevyn in the 1980s, that today is considered a Spex and is arranged every spring. About 150 students are involved in the process each year, and it is performed at Akademiska Föreningen (AF-borgen) in Lundagård. In May 2008, "God Afton Vackra Mask" ("Good Evening, Beautiful Mask"), alluding to the murder of king Gustav III, was performed.

In 2016, a team from the school became the first from Scandinavia to win a title (in the Varsity Bowl Division) in the International History Bee and Bowl European Championships, which were held in Berlin that year.
