= Association des Jeunes pour la Sensibilisation et la Solidarité =

Coordinates: 14°41′34″N 17°26′48″W

Association des Jeunes por la Sensibilisation et la Solidarite
- Abbreviation: AJSS
- Formation: September 23, 2005; 20 years ago
- Type: NGO
- Legal status: Association
- Purpose: Educational
- Headquarters: Dakar, Senegal
- Region served: West Africa
- Members: approximately 400
- Official language: Wollof, French, English a
- Staff: 4
- Volunteers: 400
- Website: ajss.onlc.fr/0-PRESENTATION-DE-LAJSS.html

The Association des Jeunes pour la Sensibilisation et la Solidarité (AJSS) is a Senegalese organization whose stated aims are to help young Senegalese away from poverty, criminality and emigration. The AJSS was officially established 23 September 2005 after a meeting held by young people from Sicap-Liberté The AJSS has approximately 400 members.

== Board of directors ==
The Board of Directors consists of The President of AJSS, The secretary general, The treasurer and The program coordinator.

=== President ===
The current president of AJSS is Mohamadou Keba Danso. Mr Danso was born in 1984 and has an educational background from Media Centre de Dakar.

=== Secretary general ===
The current secretary general of AJSS is Fama Constance Diop. Ms Diop was born in 1987 and has an educational background from both IAM - School of Management and CESAG.

=== Treasurer ===
The current treasurer of AJSS is Bakary Diatta. Mr Diatta was born in 1985 and has an educational background from UCAD.

=== Program coordinator ===
The current program coordinator of AJSS is Assane Diop. Mr Diop was born in Dakar and has an educational background from University of Cheikh Anta Diop. Also he is researcher and sociologue at the same time.

== Media ==
The AJSS appeared on a segment in the Swedish radioshow radio UPF where Mr Danso talks about the main aims of the organization AJSS.
