= Projekt Sex =

Sexual health organization

- (P6)
- Type: Student Organization
- Established: 1991
- Affiliations: Lund University; Studentlund; Students for Sexual Health (SfSH)
- Students: around 700 (40 active members)
- Location: Lund, Scania, Sweden
- Website: http://www.projekt6.se

Projekt Sex (P6) is an independent organization working for the students of Lund University to promote sexual health on a physical, emotional and social level. It was founded in 1991 in Lund in Sweden. and belongs to the umbrella organization of the student life in Lund, Studentlund, and the national umbrella organization Students for Sexual Health (SfSH). The method which is used by P6 is called Peer Education, which means that students educate other students.

== Activities ==
To promote sexual health on a physical, emotional and social level among students of Lund University, all students are welcome to pick up free condoms, lube and more information, for example about sexuality or where to get tested, from its office on the 4th floor of the AF Building in Lund. To reach students outside of the P6 office, Projekt Sex organizes many events: the most well-known are the condom raids happening during student parties and in nation clubs, where condoms are handed out and peer education takes place. Every second Thursday, P6 has its own radio show airing on Radio AF. Additionally, the organization includes an active LGBTQ-group which hosts movie nights, discussion evenings and monthly brunches. Every fourth year, Projekt Sex is also active in the student carnival Lundakarnevalen. The membership in P6 is free of charge, but students need to be members of the student umbrella organization Studentlund. P6 is also present at Campus Helsingborg, an additional campus of Lund University.

== History ==
Projekt Sex (P6) started as a peer education project under the Studenthealth and Skin Clinic in 1991. The project was launched after survey results had shown that years of frightening propaganda only had a short-term effect on the improvement of student's sexual health and that the numbers of sexually transmitted diseases among students was reaching extreme levels. The project P6 turned out to be successful; on three occasions during the 1990s, large studies were conducted which all showed a consistent positive effect. The project received a lot of attention internationally and several projects with P6 as a role model have been launched around the world until today, for example in India, China and Uganda. Around 2003, several similar projects were launched in Sweden and today there are more than 10 Swedish student organizations working with sexual health among students. In the fall of 2009, these organizations, with support from the already established organization P6, formed the national umbrella organization Students for Sexual Health (SfSH). Nowadays, P6 in Lund has around 700 members, of which 40-50 are active members, and keeps growing.
