= Lundagård (park) =

Park in Lund, Sweden

Coordinates: 55°42′17″N 13°11′37″E

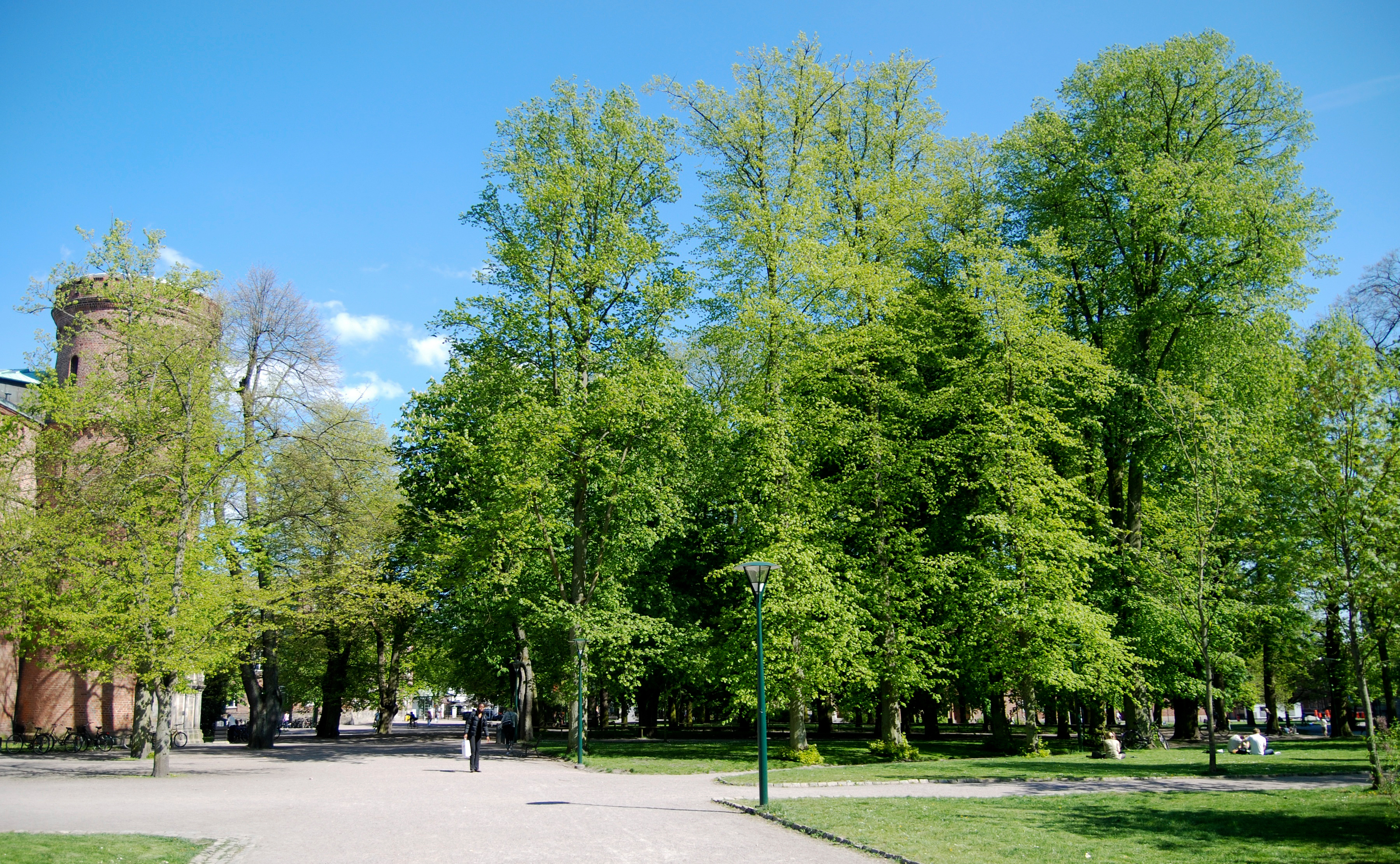
A part of the park.

Lundagård is a park located in Lund, Sweden. It is situated between the Lund University Main Building in the North, and Lund Cathedral in the South with Kungshuset in between.

== History ==
Lundagård was originally the name of the archbishop's fortress built in the early 12th century just north of Lund Cathedral. For a long time a walled garden separated "town" from "gown". Today, the one remaining gate (of the original three) is the entrance to the Kulturen museum. The park known today was designed in 1745 by the Royal architect Carl Hårleman and originally included a botanical garden.

Kungshuset, built in 1584 as a residence by the Danish king, later became the first main building of Lund University. As the university expanded the botanical garden was replaced by Universitetsplatsen in the 1880s and the new university building, located just north of Kungshuset.

Other buildings in Lundagård are the AF Borgen, the Lund University Historical Museum and Palaestra et Odeum. Tegnérsplatsen is located between the Historical Museum and the AF Borgen and contains a statue of Esaias Tegnér. In the centre of Lundagård is a statue entitled "the man that breaks free from the rock". At Universitetsplatsen is Runstenskullen, a small height with a collection of Runestones created in 1868.
