= AF Borgen =

Academic building in Sweden

Coordinates: 55°42′19″N 13°11′45″E

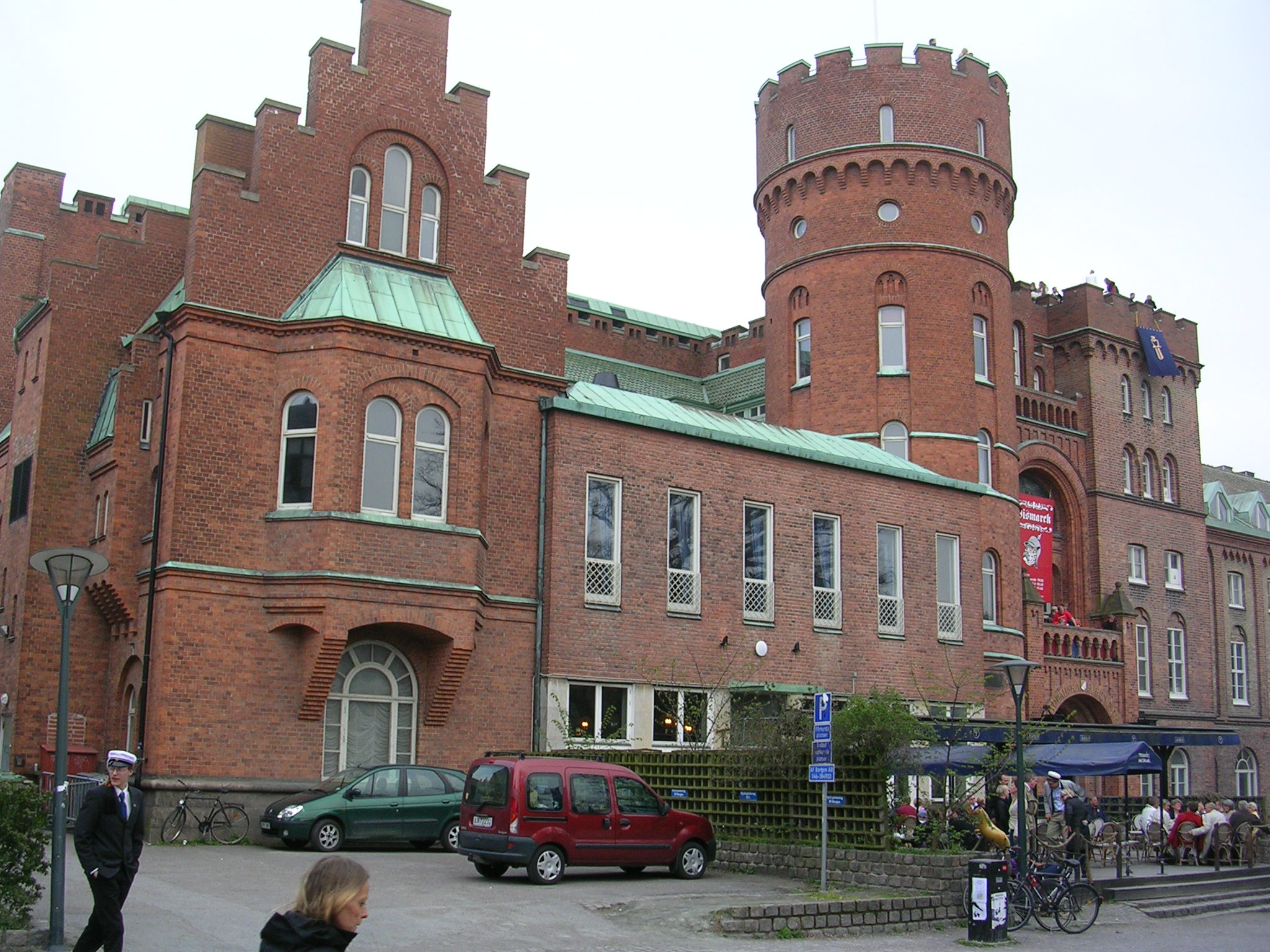
AF Borgen

AF Borgen, originally known as Akademiska Föreningens Stora Sal, is the house of The Academic Society in Lund, Sweden, constructed in 1848, situated opposite the University Main Building in Lundagård. AF Borgen houses a great hall, which has held concerts by artists such as Depeche Mode, Phil Lynott, Accept and Uriah Heep. AF Borgen also host The Academic Societies committeé such as Lund's Student Theater.

The AF Association (AF-Sällskapet) was formed many years ago to secure the future maintenance of AF Borgen. The Association is made up of selected partner companies that value student life in Lund and wish to contribute to AF Borgen’s preservation through their long-term commitment. The Association’s members include AF Bostäder, Alfa Laval, Axis, Handelsbanken, Sparbanken Skåne and Tetra Pak.
