= Elisabet Wentz-Janacek =

Swedish author and composer (1923–2014)

Elisabet Wentz-Janacek (20 August 1923 – 2014) was a Swedish author, composer, musicologist, organist, and teacher, who is best known for mapping 20,000 melody variants for Swedish hymns and helping to create the Swedish Choral Registrar. She was born in Stockholm and received a certificate, and later an honorary doctorate, from Lund University.

Wentz-Janacek wrote a biography of musician John Enninger, articles for music journals, and contributed to a book on Swedish clergyman and Nobel Prize winner Nathan Soderblom, who was a personal acquaintance of her father. Her published writing includes:

- Folk Variants and New Songs: a Small Study from Southern Sweden 1820–1900 in Yearbook for Liturgy and Hymnology - Volume 36 - p. 273
- John Enninger: Spelman, Kongl., Kammarmusikus, Klockare (available only in Swedish)
- Northern European Countries in Workbook for the Evangelical Hymnbook, vol. 4, Songs from Other Countries and Languages, ed. Wolfgang Fischer pp. 27–39. Göttingen: Vandenhoeck & Ruprecht, 2000
- Swedish Choral Registrar (a collection of 20,000 different melody variants for Swedish hymns)
- Swedish Choral Registrar: Facts and Reflections in Hymnology: Nordisk Tidskrift XXXV pp. 193–197. 2006
- Wentz-Janacek played organ and directed the children's choir at Lund Cathedral. Her musical compositions were published by Håkan Ohlssohns Boktryckeri, Proprius Musik AB, and Verbum Publications. They include:

== Organ ==
- arrangements of Scandinavian melodies
- Marsch ur Svit i folklig stil (March from Suite in Folk Style)
- Partita on "Then Som Frisker aer Och Sund"
- Partita on "Veni Creator Spiritus"

== Vocal ==
- Chorale 106
- Easter Music
- folk songs arranged for children's choir and recorders
- hymns
- "Ja, Jag Vill Sjunga" (Yes, I Want to Sing)
- "Nu Vilar Hela Jorden" (Now the Whole Earth is Resting; based on a work by John Enninger)
- "Satt en Ring Paa Hans Hand" (Put a Ring on His Hand)
- Tvaa Skaanska Koraler (Two Scandinavian Chorales)
- "Tystnad, Ljus" (Silence, Light)
