= Lund University =

Swedish university

Coordinates: 55°42′21″N 13°11′36″E

- Lunds universitet
- Latin: Universitas Lundensis
- Former names: Royal Caroline Academy; Latin: Regia Academia Carolina
- Motto: Ad utrumque
- Motto in English: Prepared for both^{[Note a]}
- Type: Public research university
- Established: 1666; 360 years ago
- Affiliations: Universitas 21; LERU; EUA; ASAIHL
- Budget: SEK 11.2 billion
- Vice-Chancellor: Erik Renström
- Academic staff: 8,500 (2026)
- Administrative staff: 3,000 (2026)
- Students: 46,000 (31,000 FTE)
- Location: Lund, Scania, Sweden
- Campus: Urban
- Colors: Dark blue and bronze
- Nickname: LU
- Website: Official website

Lund University (Swedish: Lunds universitet) is a public research university in Sweden and one of Northern Europe's oldest universities. The university is located in the city of Lund in the Swedish province of Scania (Swedish: Skåne). The university was officially founded in 1666 on the location of the old studium generale next to Lund Cathedral.

Lund University has nine faculties, with additional campuses in the cities of Malmö and Helsingborg, with around 46,000 students in 265 different programmes and 1,516 freestanding courses. The university has 560 partner universities in approximately 70 countries. It belongs to the League of European Research Universities as well as the global Universitas 21 network. Among those associated with the university are five Nobel Prize winners, a Fields Medal winner, prime ministers and business leaders.

Two major facilities for materials research have been recent strategic priorities in Lund: MAX IV, a synchrotron radiation laboratory – inaugurated in June 2016, and European Spallation Source (ESS), a new European facility that will provide up to 100 times brighter neutron beams than existing facilities today, to be fully operational in 2028.

The university centres on the Lundagård park adjacent to the Lund Cathedral, with various departments spread in different locations in town, but mostly concentrated in a belt stretching north from the park connecting to the university hospital area and continuing out to the northeastern periphery of the town, where one finds the large campus of the Faculty of Engineering.

== History ==
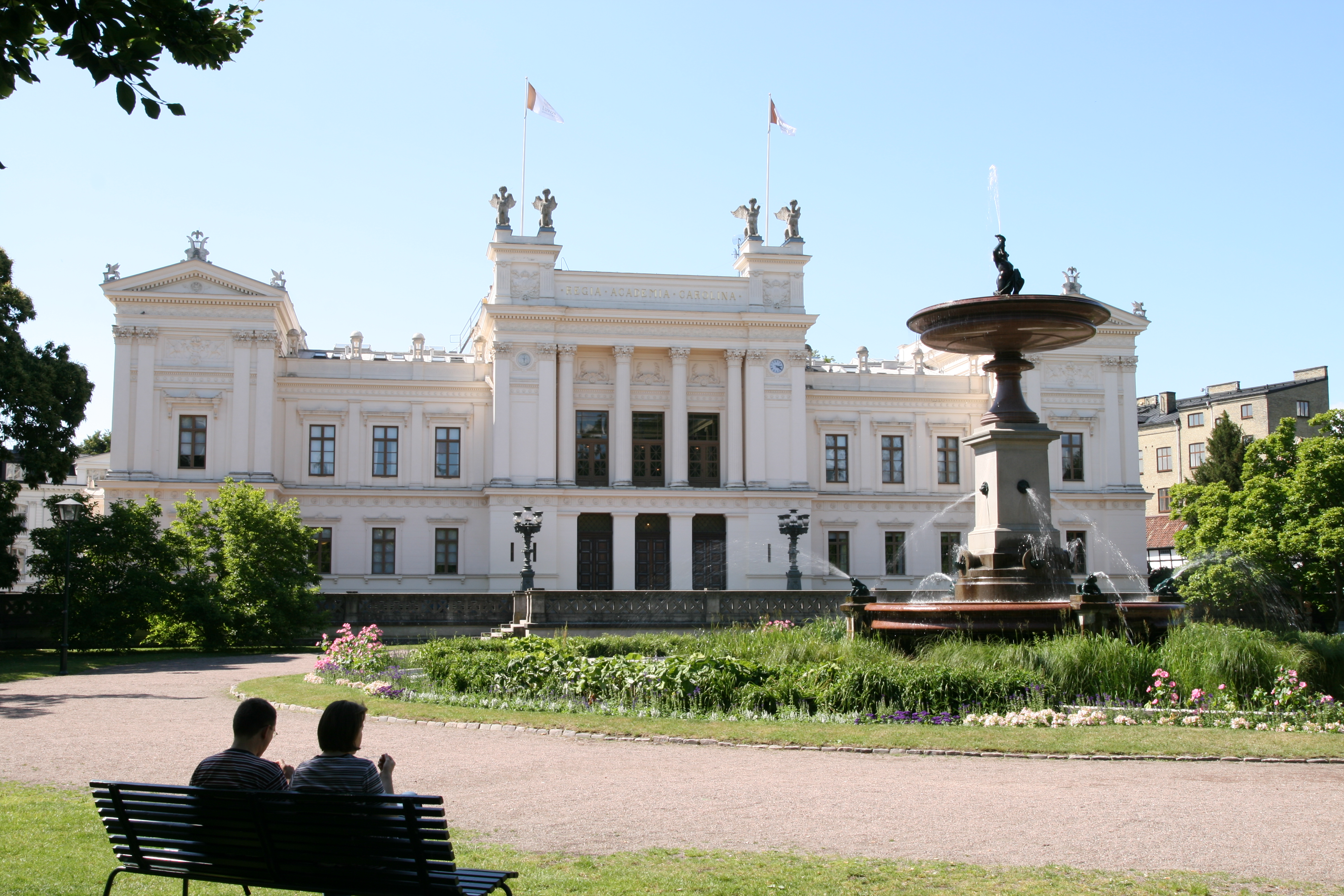
Lund University Main Building, built in 1882, designed by Helgo Zettervall

=== Medieval origins ===
The city of Lund has a long history as a centre for learning and was the ecclesiastical centre and seat of the archbishop of Denmark. A cathedral school (the Katedralskolan) for the training of clergy was established in 1085 and is today Scandinavia's oldest school.

In 1425, a Franciscan studium generale (a medieval university) was founded in Lund next to the Lund Cathedral (with baccalaureate degree started in 1438), making it the oldest institution of higher education in Scandinavia followed by studia generalia in Uppsala in 1477 and Copenhagen in 1479. After Sweden won Scania from Denmark in the 1658 Treaty of Roskilde, the university was founded in 1666 on the location of the old studium generale next to Lund Cathedral. The studium generale had not survived the Lutheran Reformation of 1536, which is why the university is considered a separate institution when founded in 1666.

=== 17th–19th centuries ===
After the Treaty of Roskilde in 1658, the Scanian lands came under the possession of the Swedish Crown, which founded the university in 1666 as a means of making Scania Swedish by educating teachers in Swedish and culturally integrate the Scania region with Sweden. The university was named Academia Carolina after Charles X Gustav of Sweden until the late 19th century when Lund University became the widespread denomination. It was the fifth university under the Swedish king, after Uppsala University (1477), the University of Tartu (1632, now in Estonia), the Academy of Åbo (1640, now in Finland), and the University of Greifswald (founded 1456; Swedish 1648–1815, now in Germany).

The university was at its founding granted four faculties: Law, Theological, Medicine and Philosophy. They were the cornerstones, and for more than 200 years this system was in effect. Towards the end of the 17th century, the number of students hovered around 100. Some notable professors in the early days were Samuel Pufendorf, a juridical historian; and Canutus Hahn and Kristian Papke in philosophy.

The Scanian War in 1676 led to a shut-down, which lasted until 1682. The university was re-opened largely due to regional patriots, but the university was not to enjoy a high status until well into the 19th century. Lecturing rooms were few, and lectures were held in the Lund Cathedral and its adjacent chapel. The professors were underpaid.

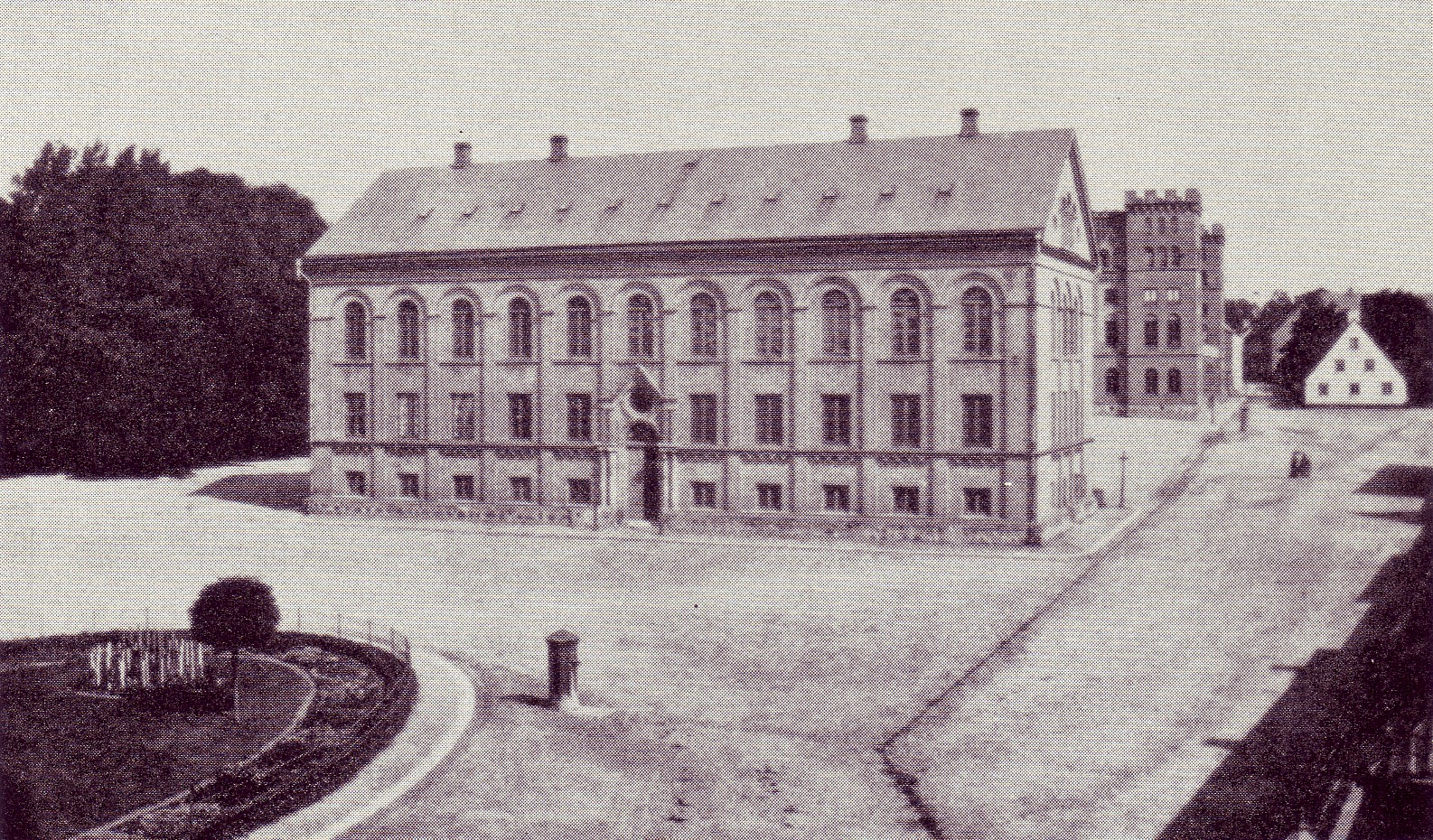
View of the Historical Museum building in the 19th century

In 1716, Charles XII of Sweden entered Lund. He stayed in Lund for two years, in between his warlike expeditions. Lund and the university attracted a temporary attention boost. The most notable lecturer during this time was Andreas Rydelius.

Peace was finally restored with the death of Charles XII in 1718, and during the first half of the 18th century, the university was granted added funds. The number of students was now around 500. Despite not being on par with Uppsala University, it had built a solid reputation and managed to attract prominent professors.

Around 1760 the university's reputation dropped as the number of students fell below 200, most of whom hailed from around the province. However, by 1780 its reputation was largely restored and continued to rise through the 1820s. This was largely owing to popular and well-educated lecturers particularly in philology; the prominent professor Esaias Tegnér was a particularly notable character with widespread authority. He, in turn, attracted others towards Lund. One of these was the young theological student C. G. Brunius, who studied ancient languages under Tegnér and was later to become a professor of Greek. With time he was to devote himself to architecture and he redesigned several of Lund's buildings, as well as churches of the province.

In 1829, the murder at Locus Peccatorum occurred in the Locus Peccatorum residence at the university. Jacob Wilhelm Blomdahl, a theology student, beat his fellow student Anders Landén to death in the night. Blomdahl was later executed for the murder, and the controversy the murder created around the conditions of student life were a factor in the creation of Akademiska Föreningen in the 1830s.

In 1845 and 1862 Lund co-hosted Nordic student meetings together with the University of Copenhagen.

A student called Elsa Collin was the first woman in the whole of Sweden to take part in a spex (a student comedy show).

=== 20th century – present ===
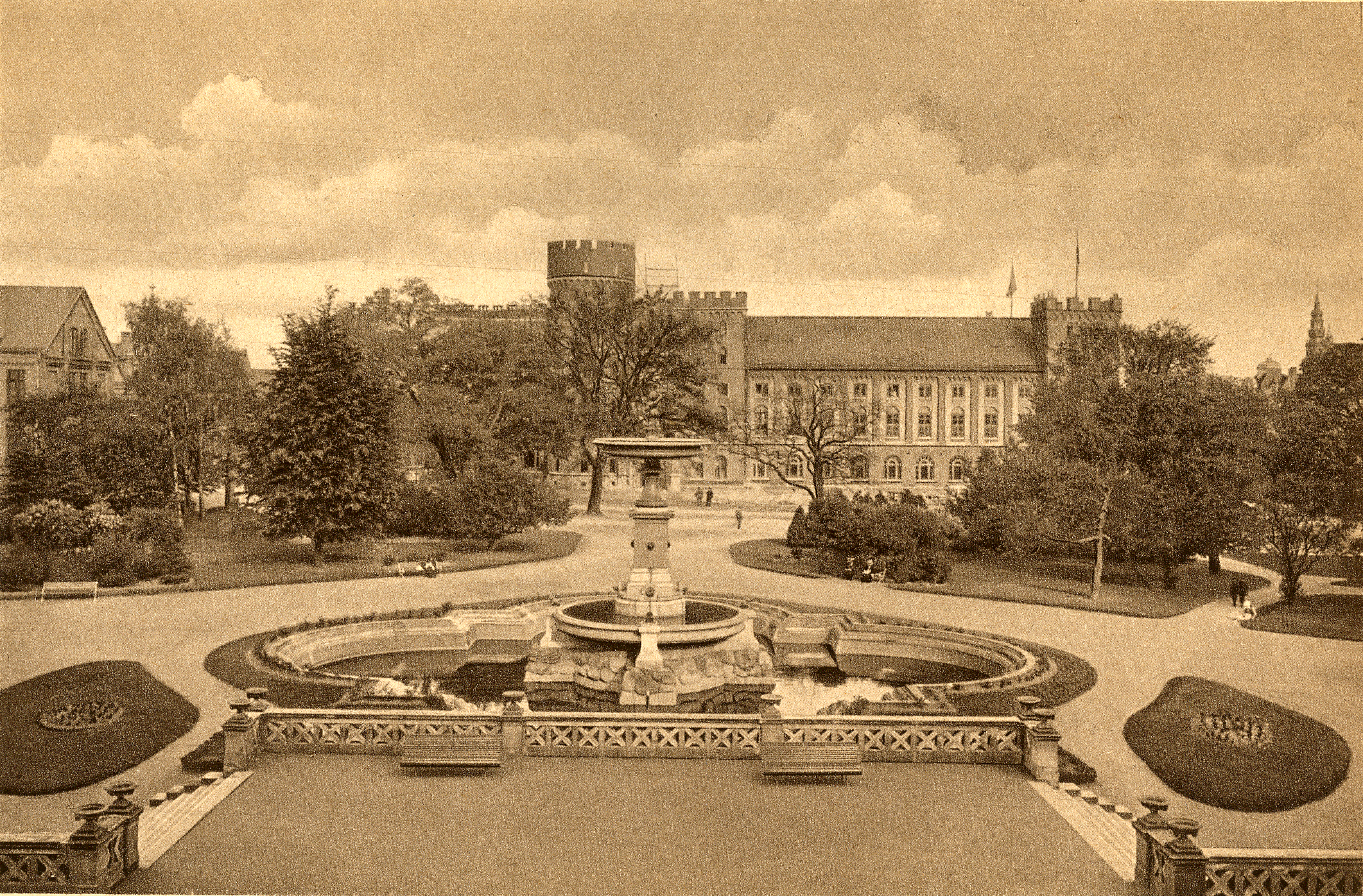
The University Square in the 1910s

In the early 20th century, the university had a student population as small as one thousand, consisting largely of upper-class pupils training to become civil servants, lawyers and doctors. In the coming decades, it started to grow significantly until it became one of the country's largest. In 1964 the social sciences were split from the Faculty of Humanities. Lund Institute of Technology was established in 1961 but was merged with Lund University eight years later.

In recent years, Lund University has been very popular among applicants to Swedish higher education institutions, both nationally and internationally. For studies starting in autumn 2012, Lund received 11,160 foreign master's applications from 152 countries, which was roughly one third of all international applications to Swedish universities.

== Women at the university ==
The first woman to study in Lund was Hildegard Björck (spring of 1880) who had previously studied in Uppsala and had been the first Swedish woman ever to get an academic degree. Her tenure in Lund was however very brief and the medical student Hedda Andersson who entered the university later in 1880 (two years before the next woman to do so) is usually mentioned as the first woman at Lund University. Hilma Borelius was the first woman who finished a doctorate in Lund, in 1910. The first woman to be appointed to a professor's chair was the historian Birgitta Odén in 1965, though Carin Boalt was made a professor at the Faculty of Engineering, which at the time was a separate institution, in 1964. In 1992 Boel Flodgren, Professor of Business Law, was appointed rector magnificus (or, strictly speaking, rectrix magnifica) of Lund University. As such, she was the first woman to be the head of a European university.

== Campus ==
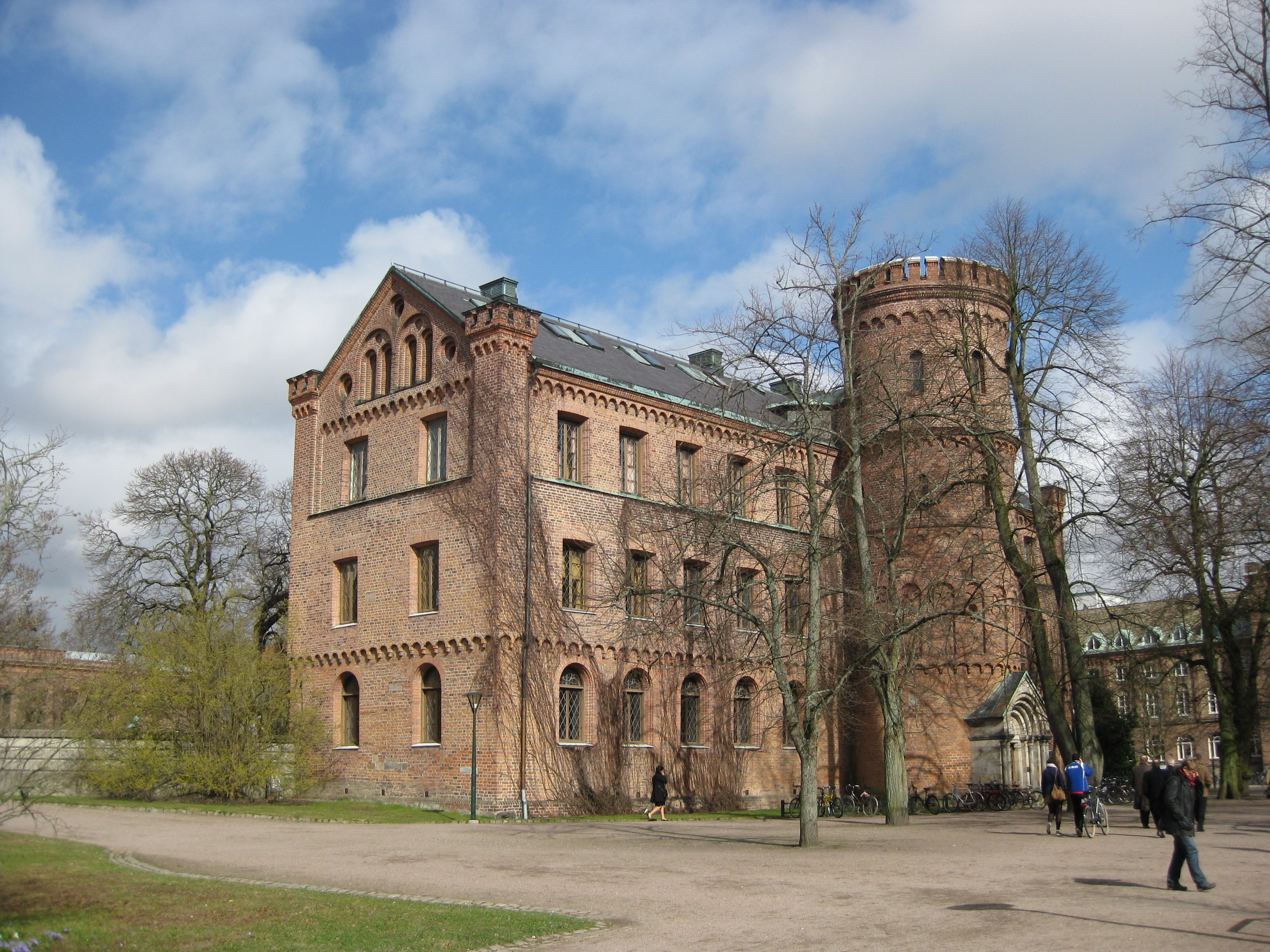
Kungshuset, the oldest university building (completed 1584)

The university's facilities are mainly located in the small city of Lund in Scania, about 15 km away from central Malmö and 50 km from Copenhagen. The large student and staff population makes an impact on the city, effectively making it a university town. Over a hundred university buildings scatter around town, most of them in an area covering more than 1 km^{2}, stretching towards the north-east from Lundagård park in the very centre of town. Buildings in and around Lundagård include the main building, Kungshuset, the Historical Museum and the Academic Society's headquarters. The main library building is located in a park 400 meters to the north, followed by the large hospital complex.

Lund University has a satellite campus in nearby Malmö, Sweden's third-largest city. The Faculty of Fine and Performing Arts' three academies: Malmö Art Academy, Malmö Academy of Music and Malmö Theatre Academy, are all located in Malmö. The city is also the location of Skåne University Hospital, where Lund University performs a considerable amount of research and medical training.

Campus Helsingborg is, as the name suggests, located in the city of Helsingborg, almost 50 km from Lund. Opened in 2000, it consists of a building in the city center, right next to the central train station and the harbor. Nearly 3,000 students are based on the campus. The Department of Service Management and the Department of Communication and Media are among those located at the campus in Helsingborg.

Teaching and training at the School of Aviation (LUSA) take place at an airfield next to the town of Ljungbyhed, about 40 km away from Lund.

== Museums, collections and archives ==
=== Skissernas Museum ===
Skissernas Museum, The International Gallery

Skissernas Museum – the Museum of Artistic Process and Public Art – is an art museum focusing on the artistic creative process. It houses the world's largest collection sketches, models and preparatory works for public art.

The museum exhibits modern and contemporary art from small pencil drawings to colourful, monumental paintings and large-scale plaster sculptures. There are sketches by for example Barbara Hepworth, Henri Matisse, Sonia Delaunay, Henry Moore and Fernand Léger, and one of Europe’s foremost collections of sketches by Mexican monumental painters such as Diego Rivera and David Alfaro Siqueiros. The Swedish Gallery exhibits works by Sigrid Hjertén, Isaac Grünewald and Siri Derkert and contemporary artists such as Linn Fernström, Gerhard Nordström and Matthias van Arkel.

=== Historical Museum ===
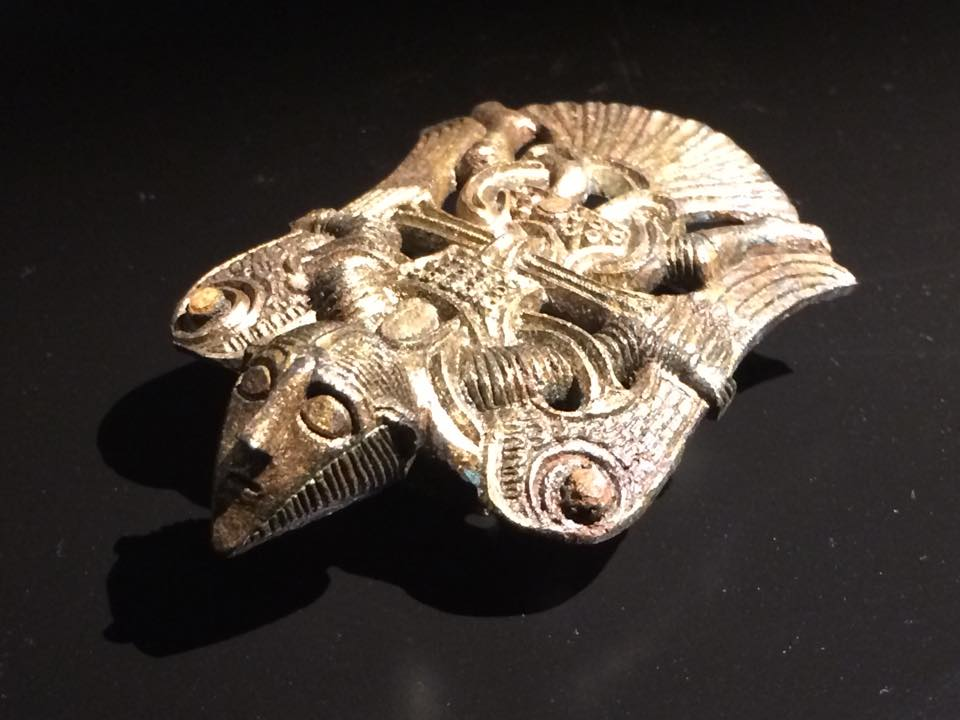
Historical Museum, find from Uppåkra, possibly depicting Völund, (eng. Wayland the Smith) from norse mythology

The Historical Museum at Lund University is the largest museum in southern Sweden for archaeological finds, coins, medieval church art and cultural history collections, illustrating the development of humans and society from the Ice Age to the present day. Including the finds from Uppåkra, the richest Iron Age settlement in the Nordic countries. It is a museum of regional history and archaeology, whose exhibition spaces are located in the Lundagård park in the historic old town of Lund, on Krafts torg, in the immediate vicinity of Lund cathedral. The museum is part of Lund University’s public activities and dates back to the 18th century.

=== Botanical Garden ===
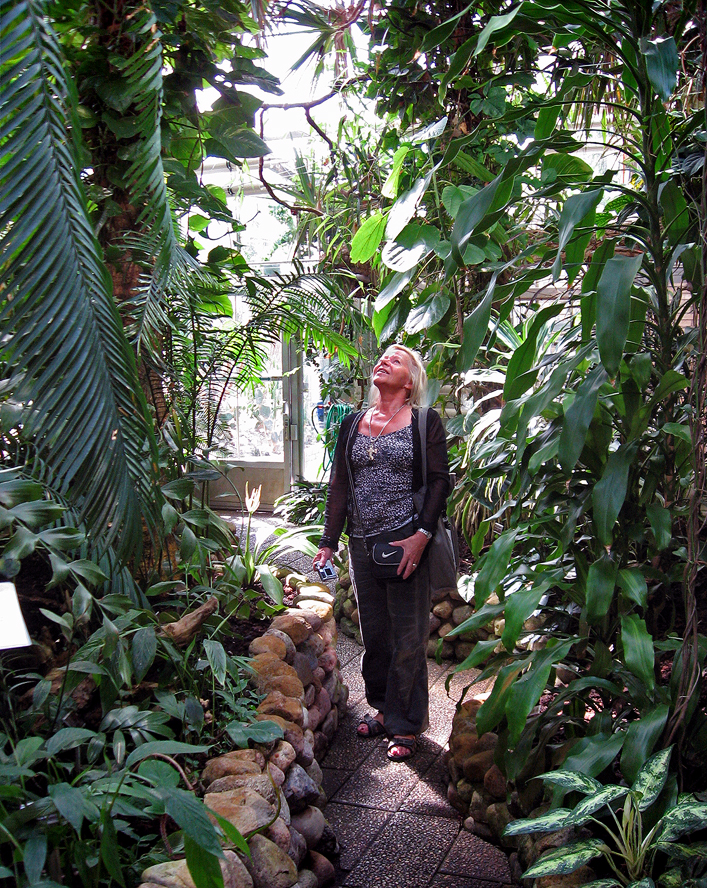
Botanical Garden, greenhouse interior

Botaniska trädgården is a botanical garden in central Lund, Sweden, open to the public daily without charge. The living collections include plants from around the world and feature both wild species and plants cultivated by humans for a variety of purposes. The heritage-listed 8 hectares site contains 7000 species of plants, of which 2000 are found in the greenhouses representing nine different climate zones.

=== Lund University Library ===
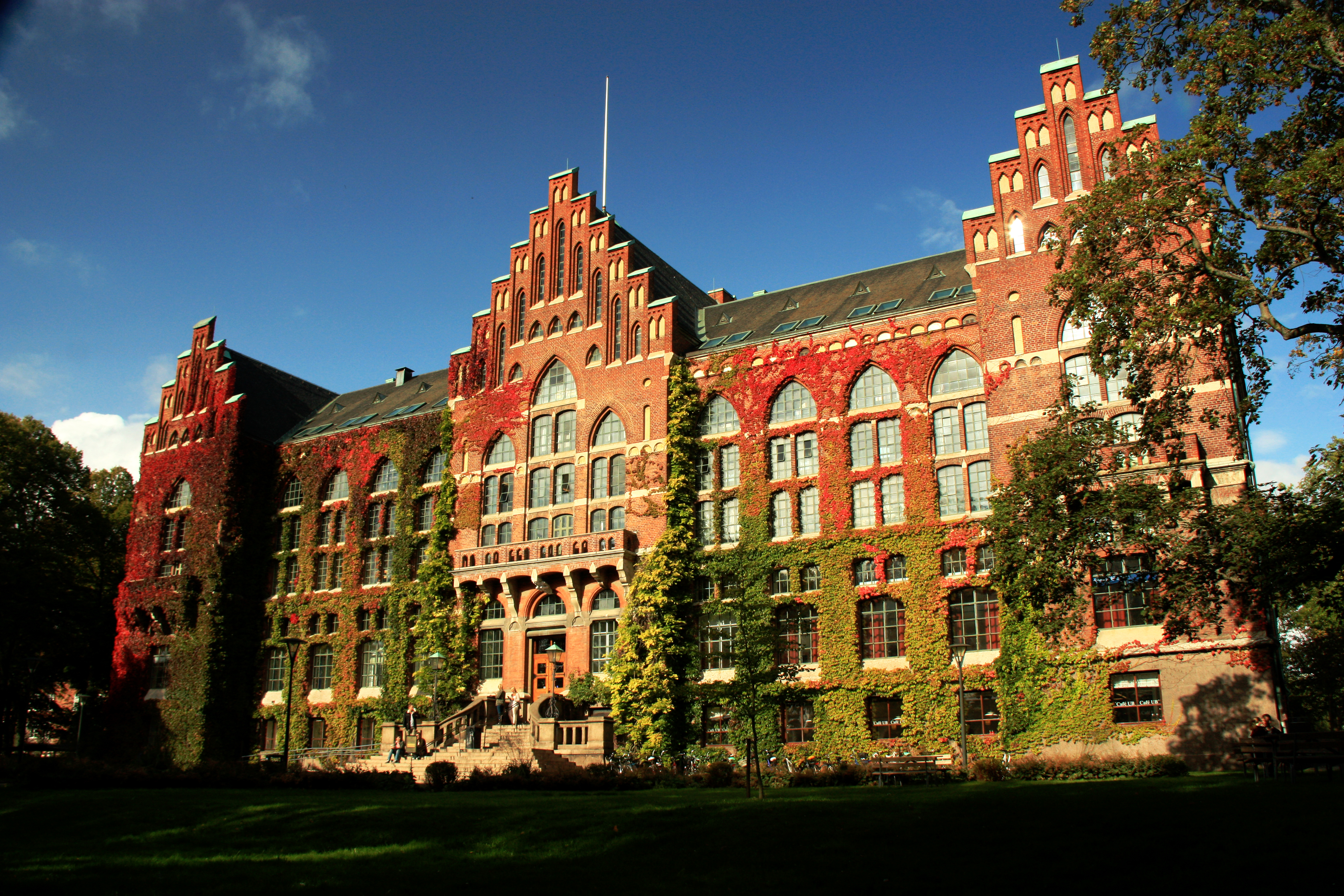
Lund University Library, building from 1907, voted Sweden's most beautiful building in 2019!

Lund University library was established in 1668 at the same time as the university and is one of Sweden's oldest and largest libraries. Since 1698 it has received legal deposit copies of everything printed in the country. Today six Swedish libraries receive legal deposit copies, but only Lund and the Royal Library in Stockholm are required to keep everything for posterity. Swedish imprints make up half of the collections, which amount to 170,000 linear meters of shelving (2006). The library serves 620,000 loans per year, the staff is 200 full-time equivalents, and the 33 branch libraries house 2600 reading room desks. The current main building at Helgonabacken, designed by architect Alfred Hellerström, opened in 1907. It was named Sweden's most beautiful building in 2019. The old library building was Liberiet close to the city's cathedral. Liberiet was built as a library in the 15th century but now serves as a cafe.

=== Biological Museum ===
The Biological Museum is a research collection, not having public exhibitions. It possesses about 13 million specimens of plants and animals. The museum was founded by Kilian Stobaeus, a teacher of Carl Linnaeus, in 1735. It is divided into three sections: the herbarium, the entomological collections and the zoological collections. The collections are particularly rich in specimens from Sweden and the other Nordic countries, and hold more than 40,000 type specimens. The collections were previously known as the Botanical Museum and Museum of Zoology. These were merged into the Biological Museum in 2005. The museum is a part of the Department of Biology, Faculty of Sciences. It holds the historically important collections of Johan Wilhelm Zetterstedt, Carl Gustaf Thomson, Carl Adolph Agardh, Anders Jahan Retzius, Erik Acharius, Axel Gustaf Gyllenkrok and Sven Nilsson.

== Hospital ==
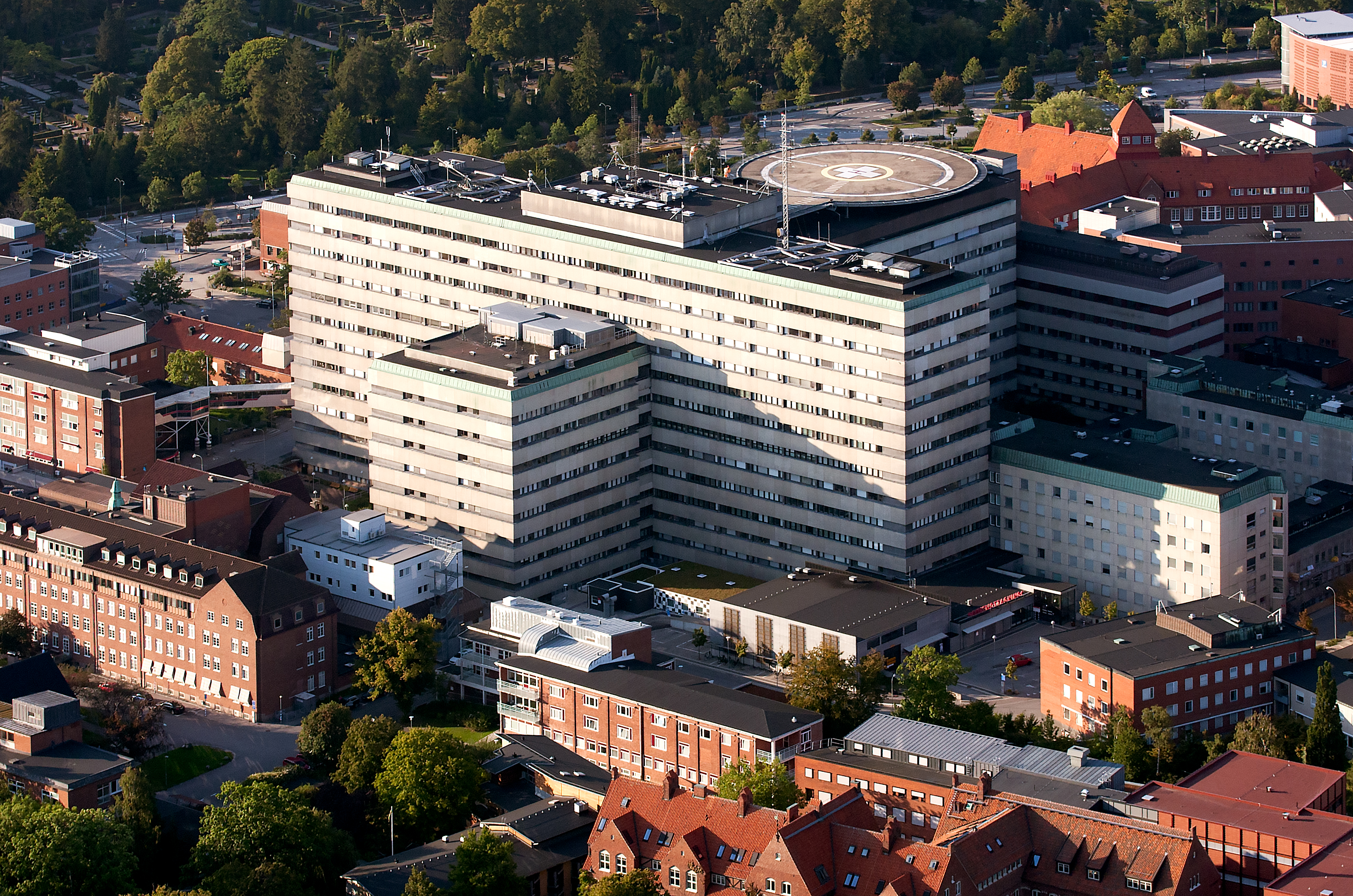
University Hospital

Education and research in the health sciences at the university are operated in cooperation with Skåne University Hospital, located in both Lund and Malmö. Medical education takes place in the Biomedical Centre, next to the hospital in Lund. Nursing and occupational therapy were taught in the Health Sciences Centre nearby, but have since then moved to the newly inaugurated Forum Medicum, which brings all health sciences disciplines under one roof. The university also operates the Clinical Research Centre in Malmö, featuring many specialized laboratories. There are over 100 faculty.

== Accommodation ==
LU Accommodation offers housing in the cities of Lund, Malmö and Helsingborg. There are different room types including dormitory rooms, studio flats and one and two-bedroom apartments.

== Organisation ==
=== Administration ===
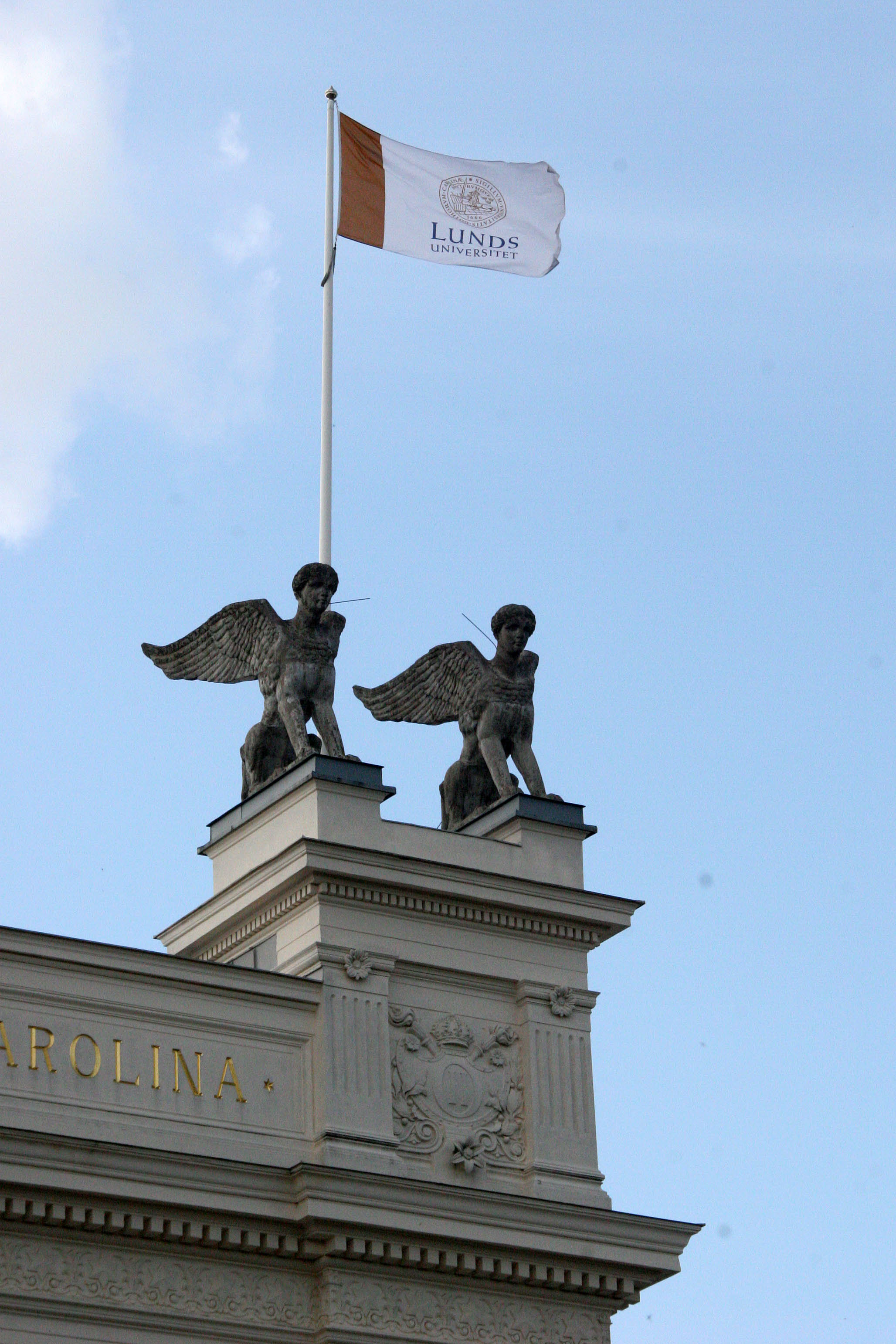
Sphinxes overlooking Lundagård Park

The University Board is the university's highest decision-making body. The Board comprises the Vice-Chancellor, representatives of the teaching staff and students, and representatives of the community and business sector. Chair of the board is Margot Wallström. Executive power lies with the Vice-Chancellor and the University Management Group, to which most other administrative bodies are subordinate.

=== Faculties ===
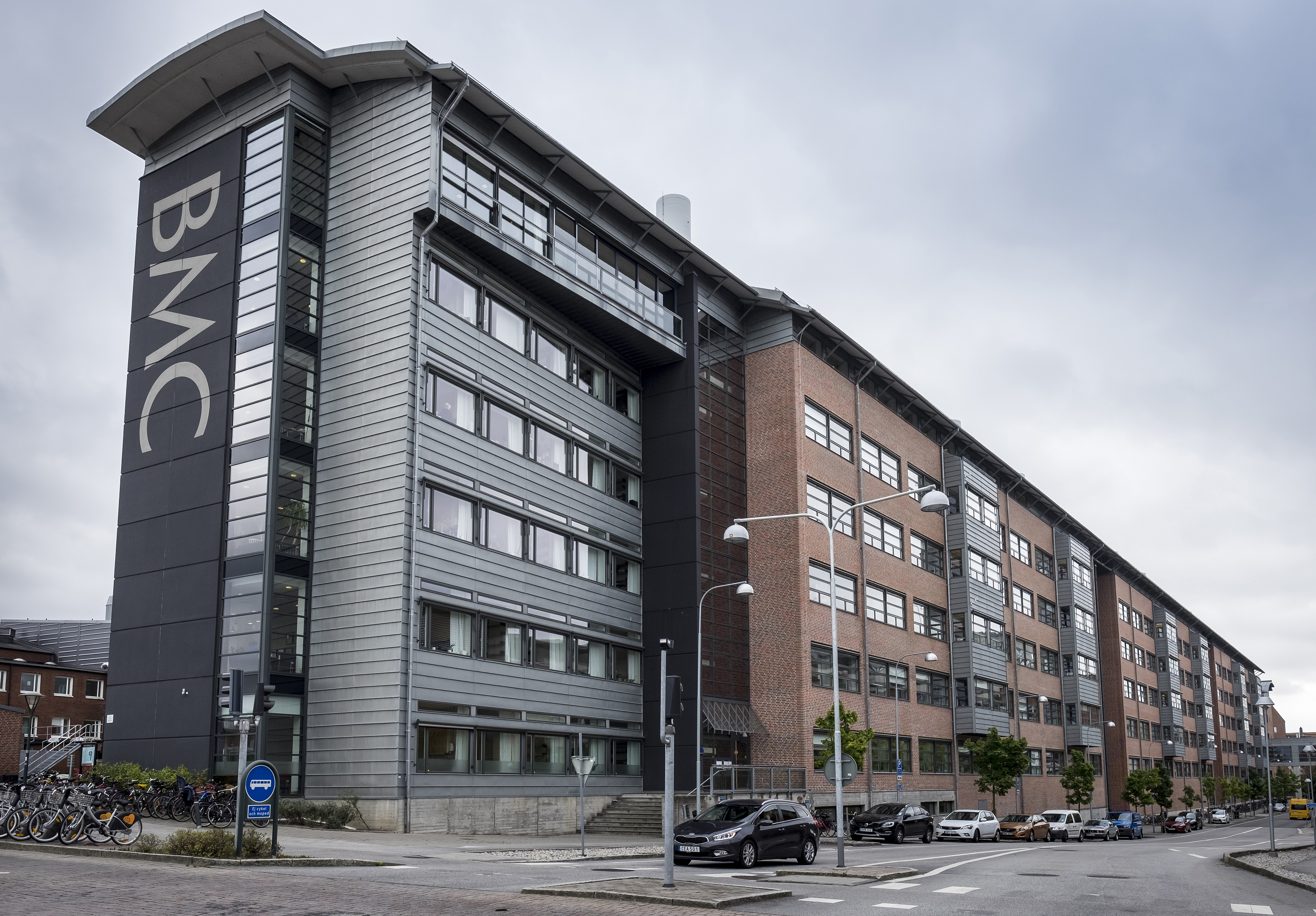
BMC, center for research in biology and medicine

Lund University is divided into nine faculties:

- Faculties of Humanities and Theology
- Faculty of Engineering (LTH)
- Faculty of Fine & Performing Arts
- Faculty of Law
- Faculty of Medicine
- Faculty of Science
- Faculty of Social Sciences
- School of Aviation
- School of Economics and Management

=== Research centres ===
The university is also organised into more than 20 institutes and research centres, such as:

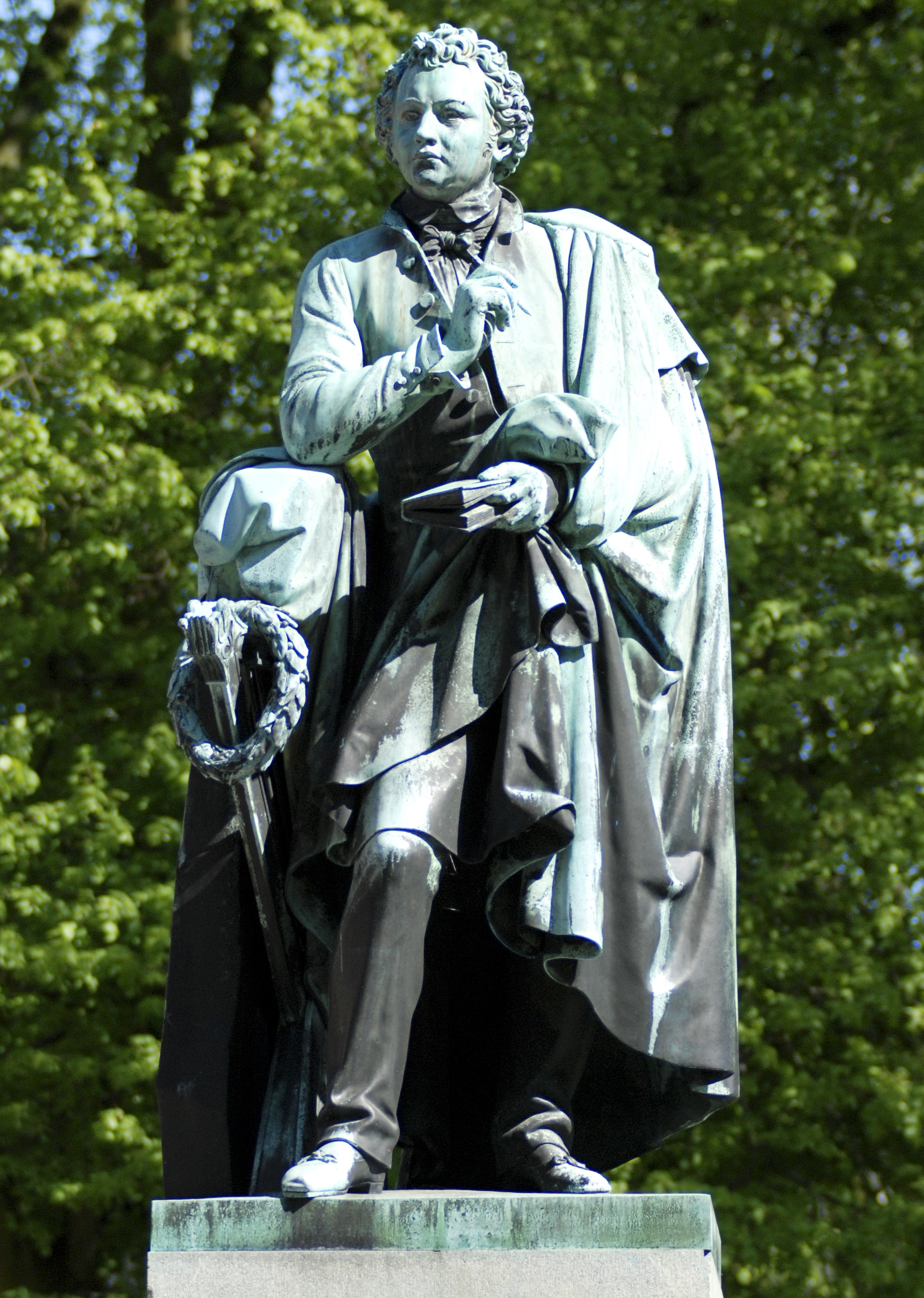
Esaias Tegnér statue near the towering Lund Cathedral

- Lund University Centre for Sustainability Studies (LUCSUS)
- Biomedical Centre
- Centre for Biomechanics
- Centre for Chemistry and Chemical Engineering - Kemicentrum
- Centre for East and South-East Asian Studies
- Centre for European Studies
- Centre for Geographical Information Systems (GIS Centrum)
- Centre for Innovation, Research and Competence in the Learning Economy (CIRCLE)
- Center for Middle Eastern Studies at Lund University
- Centre for Molecular Protein Science
- Centre for Preparedness and Resilience (LUPREP)
- Centre for Risk Analysis and Management (LUCRAM)
- International Institute for Industrial Environmental Economics at Lund University (IIIEE)
- Lund Functional Food Science Centre
- Lund Center for the History of Knowledge (LUCK)
- Lund University Diabetes Centre (LUDC)
- MAX lab - Accelerator physics, synchrotron radiation and nuclear physics research
- Pufendorf Institute
- Raoul Wallenberg Institute of Human Rights and Humanitarian Law
- Swedish South Asian Studies Network

== Academics ==
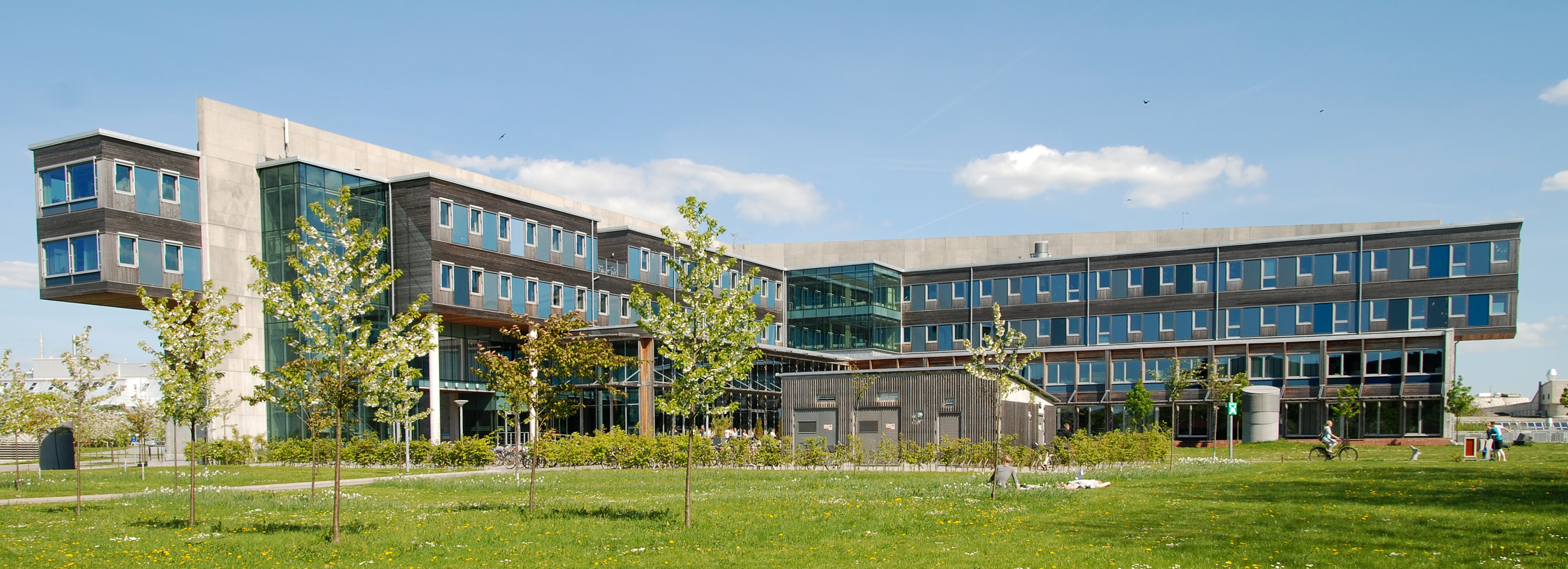
LTH's Design Centre

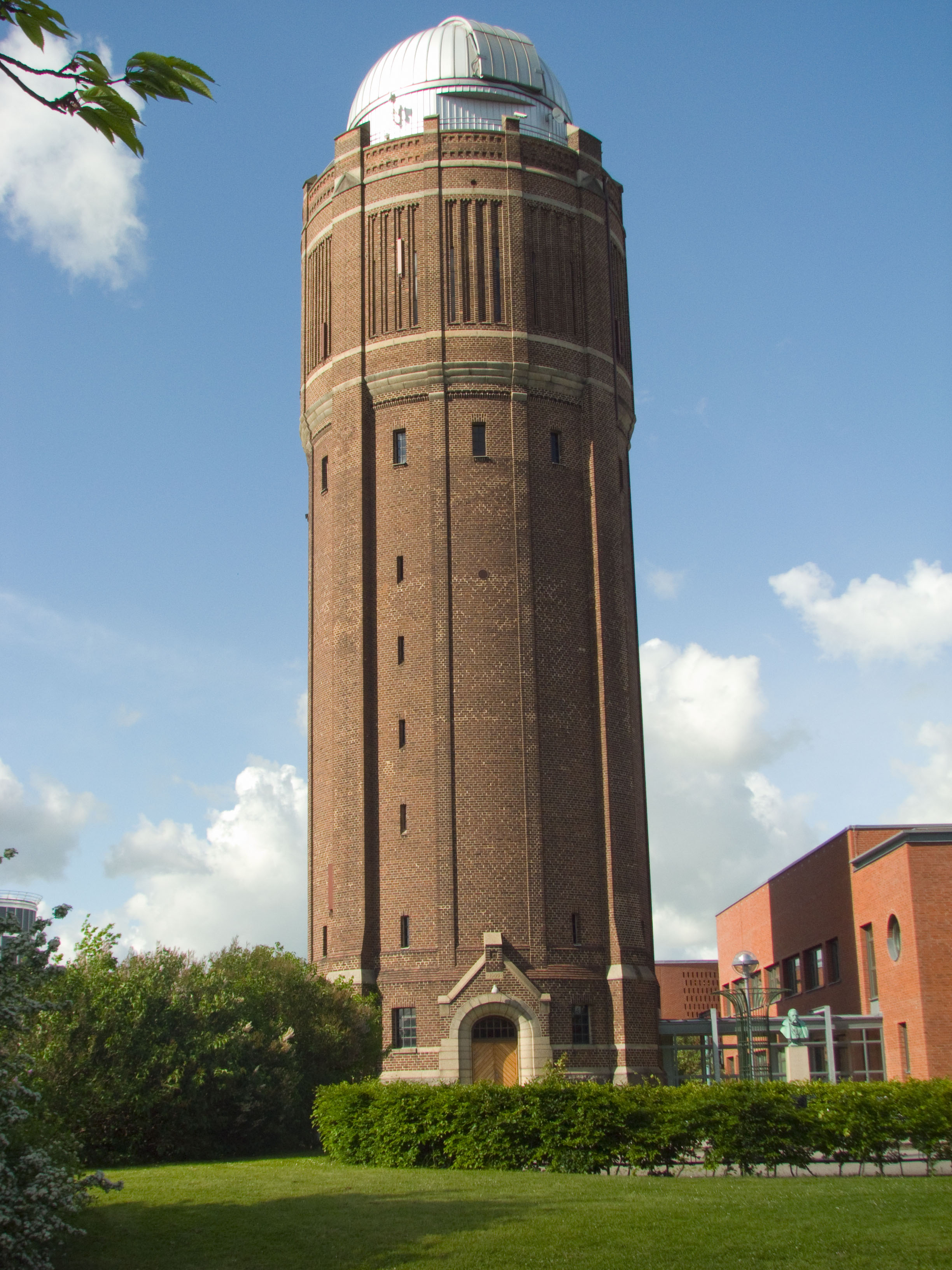
University Observatory

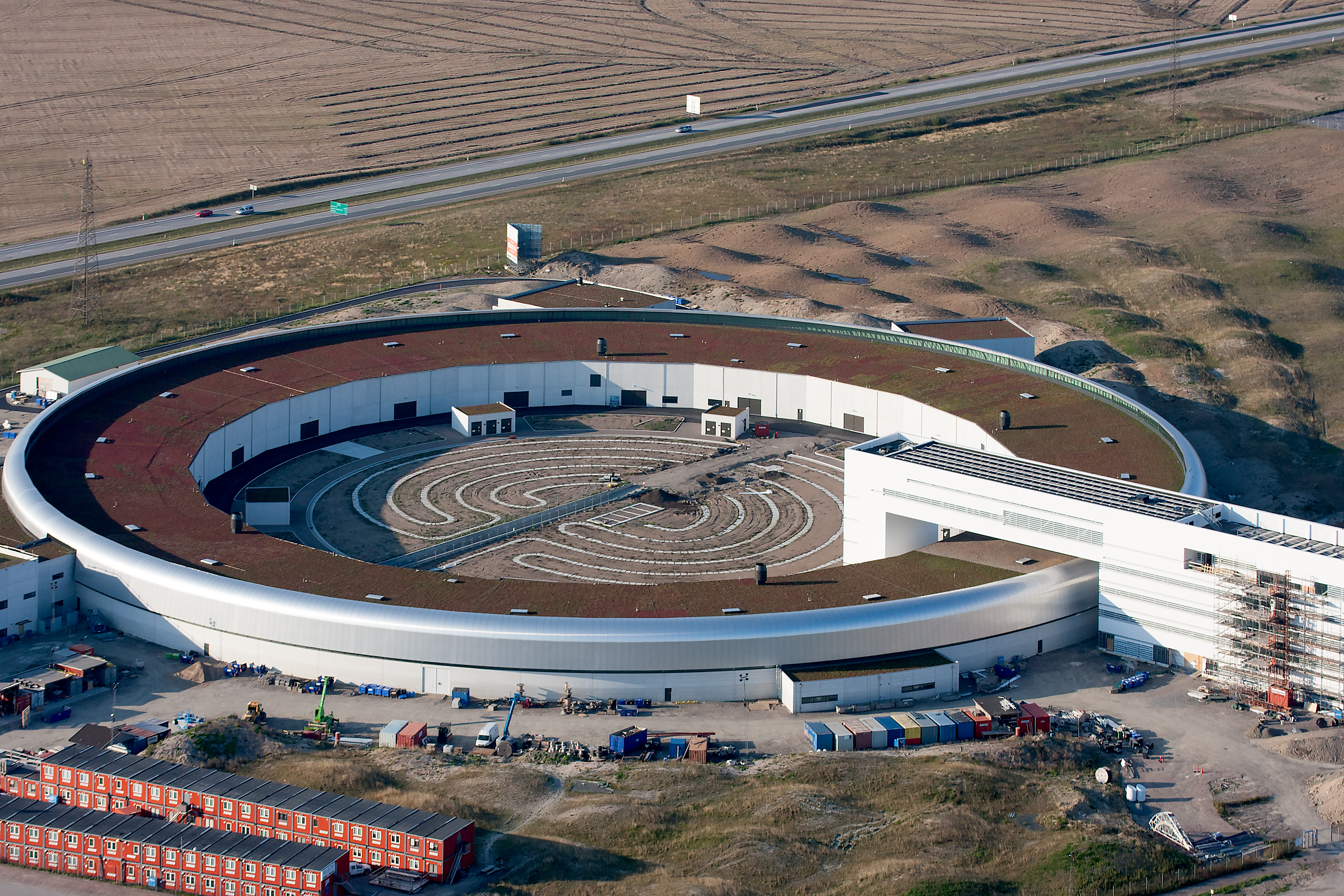
MAX IV synchrotron radiation laboratory

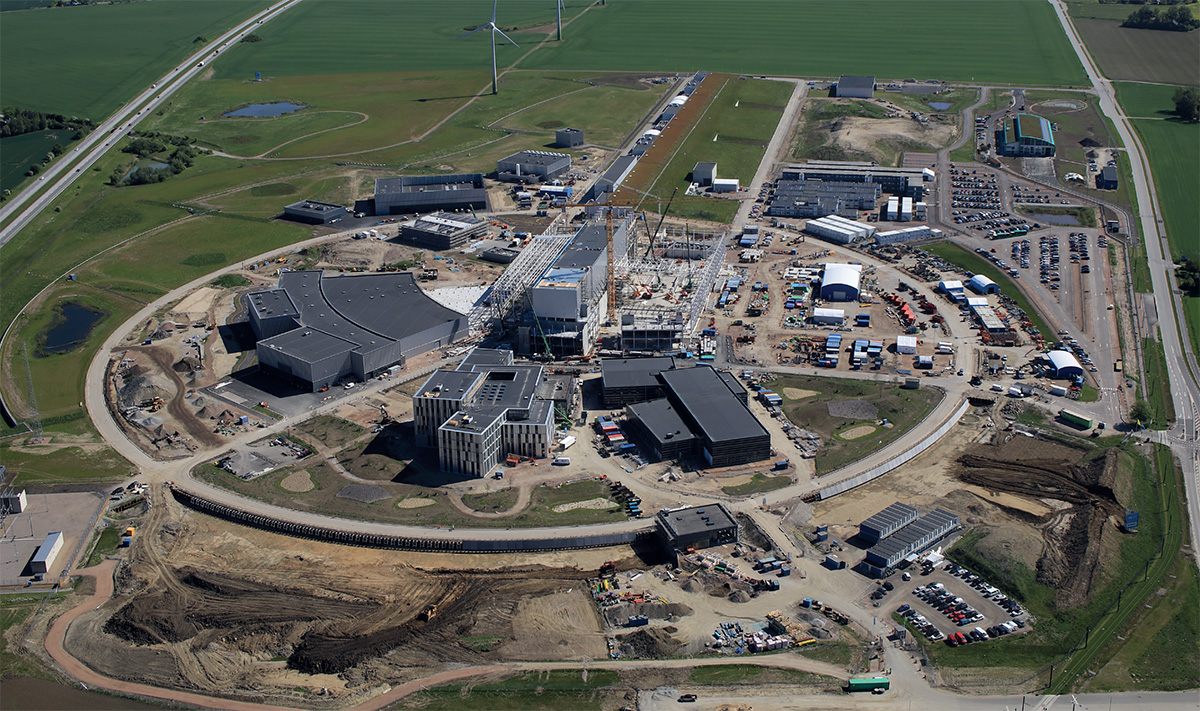
European Spallation Source (ESS): a multidiciplinary research facility at Lund

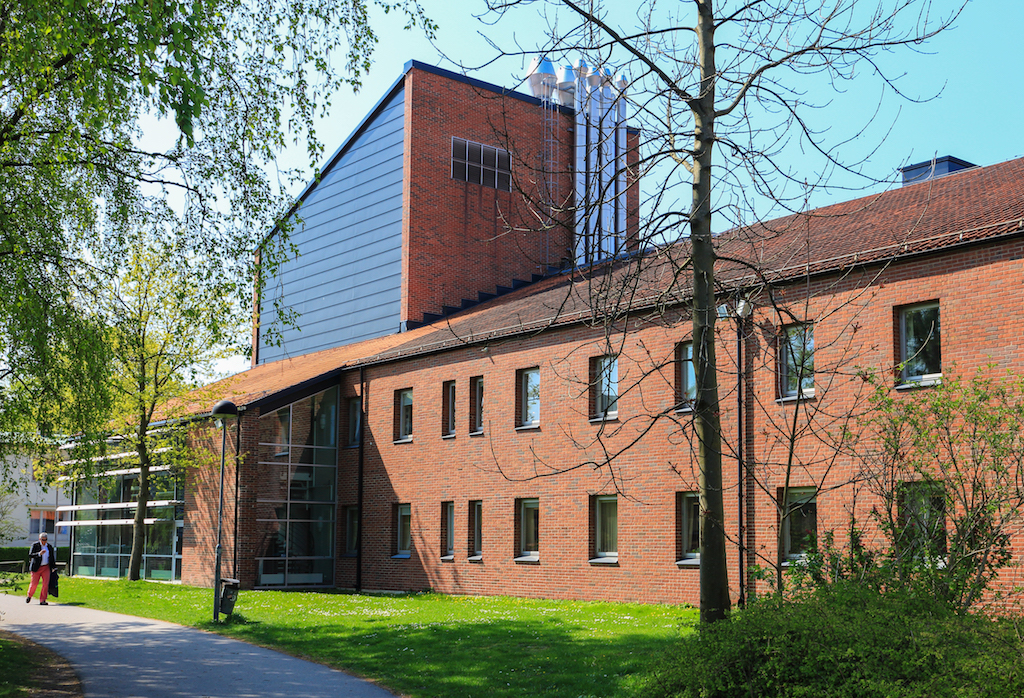
Nano-science & technology Lab

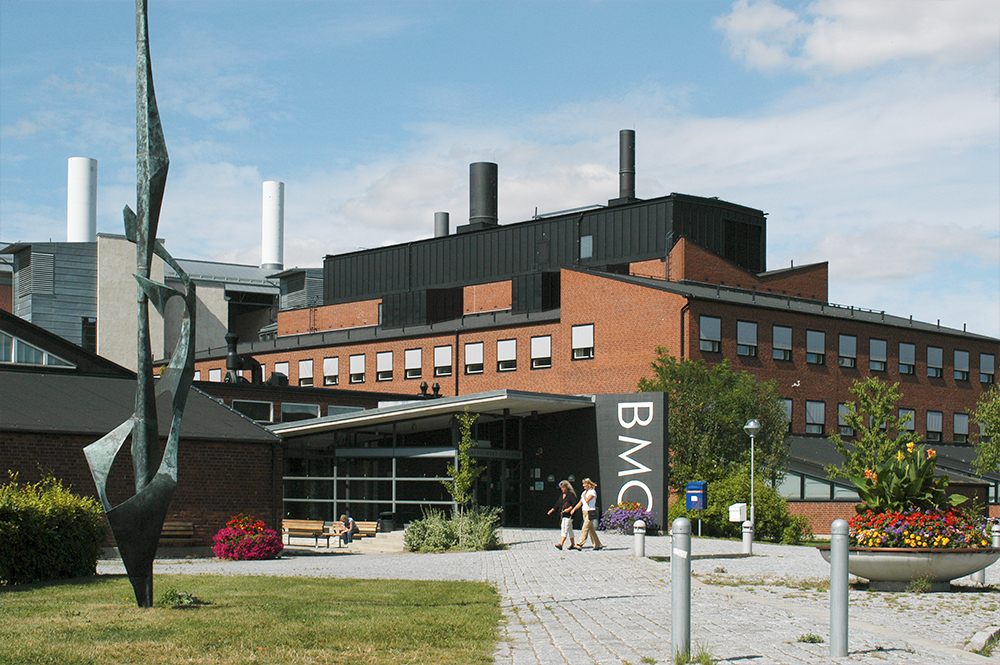
Bio Medical Center

=== Education ===
The university offers around 265 educational programmes and some 1516 courses. Lund University offers 10 Bachelor's degree programmes and more than 130 Master's programmes in English, allowing foreign students to study at the university. The university offers 6 of the 10 most popular master's programs in Sweden (2021), in terms of the numbers of applications. Five of those programs are offered at the School of Economics and Management (LUSEM). The LUSEM Master's in Finance ranks 36th in the world, according to the Financial Times annual global ranking. The Financial Times Master's programmes in Management ranking places Lund 44th in the world.

=== Research ===
Lund University is well known as one of Scandinavia's largest research universities. It ranks among top performers in the European Union in terms of papers accepted for publication in scientific journals. It is also Sweden's top receiver of research grants from the EU, and places fifth among european universities in funding from Horizon Europe. The university is active in many internationally important research areas, such as neurology, nanotechnology, climate change and stem cell biology.

=== Innovation ===
One of the most famous innovations based on research from Lund University is diagnostic ultrasound, which is today a routine method of examination in hospitals around the world. Other examples of pioneering innovations are the artificial kidney, which laid the foundations for the multinational company Gambro and which makes life easier for dialysis patients worldwide, and Bluetooth technology, which enables wireless communication over short distances. Here is a sample selection of discoveries from Lund through the ages.

- 1847: Ice Age theory
- 1887: Rydberg's constant
- 1916: The M series and new methods of measurement
- 1926: The first respirator
- 1944: The Tetrahedron packing method
- 1946: The artificial kidney
- 1953: Medical ultrasound
- 1956: Human chromosome number
- 1957: Dopamine
- 1962: The Falck-Hillarp method, Partial differential equations
- 1963: Lactose intolerance
- 1966: Asthma medicine
- 1967: Nicorette
- 1969: New radiocontrast agent
- 1971: The modern day medical ventilator
- 1972: The Inkjet printer
- 1987: Inhaler for asthma medicine
- 1990: Oat milk
- 1991: Proviva (probiotic drink)
- 1993: Qlik – data visualization software
- 1994: Bluetooth
- 1997: Precise biometrics – fingerprint reader
- 1999: Digital diagnostic support
- 2000: LUCAS device for automated CPR
- 2004: Facial recognition technology
- 2005: Hövding invisible cycling helmet
- 2008: Cancer diagnostics using MR technology
- 2009: Treatment of pre-eclampsia
- 2012: The world's most water-efficient shower
- 2013: A unique new method for simpler and more accurate cancer diagnosis
- 2014: Protein diagnostics of cancer
- 2018: Suture-TOOL. A surgical device for fast and standardized closure of the abdominal wall

=== Rankings ===
University rankings

Global – Overall
- ARWU World: 101–150 (2024)
- QS World: 72 (2026)
- RUR World: 51 (2026)
- THE World: 95 (2025)
- USNWR Global: =125 (2025)

Lund University consistently ranks among the top 100 universities in the world, with several subjects ranked in the top 50 and higher. Lund was ranked 72nd in the world in the 2026 QS World University Rankings, making it the top ranked comprehensive university in Sweden. It is the most popular university in Sweden for international applicants and was ranked as the 40th most international university in the world by Times Higher in 2021. Lund ranks 1st in the World in the 2026 QS World University Sustainability Ranking. Lund is the highest-ranked university in the Nordic region according to the QS World University Rankings: Europe 2026, where it is also placed joint 12th in Europe.

The QS World University Rankings by Subject for 2021 places Lund in the top 50 in the following subjects: Geography (24th), Development Studies (32nd), Environmental Sciences (44th) and Nursing (47th). QS also has a separate ranking for business Master's (the QS Business Masters Rankings), where Lund University is ranked in the categories 'Marketing' (42nd) and 'Finance' (47th) in 2022. Additionally, the Times Higher subject rankings for 2021 places Lund in 65th place in Law.

Lund University ranks 51st in the RUR World University Rankings. RUR places Lund in the top tier for the following disciplines: Humanities (32nd), Life Sciences (12th), Medical Sciences (35th), Natural Sciences (18th), Social Sciences (89th), and Technical Sciences (38th).

In 2025, Lund placed 74th in the Times Higher Education (THE) World Reputation Ranking.

== Student life ==
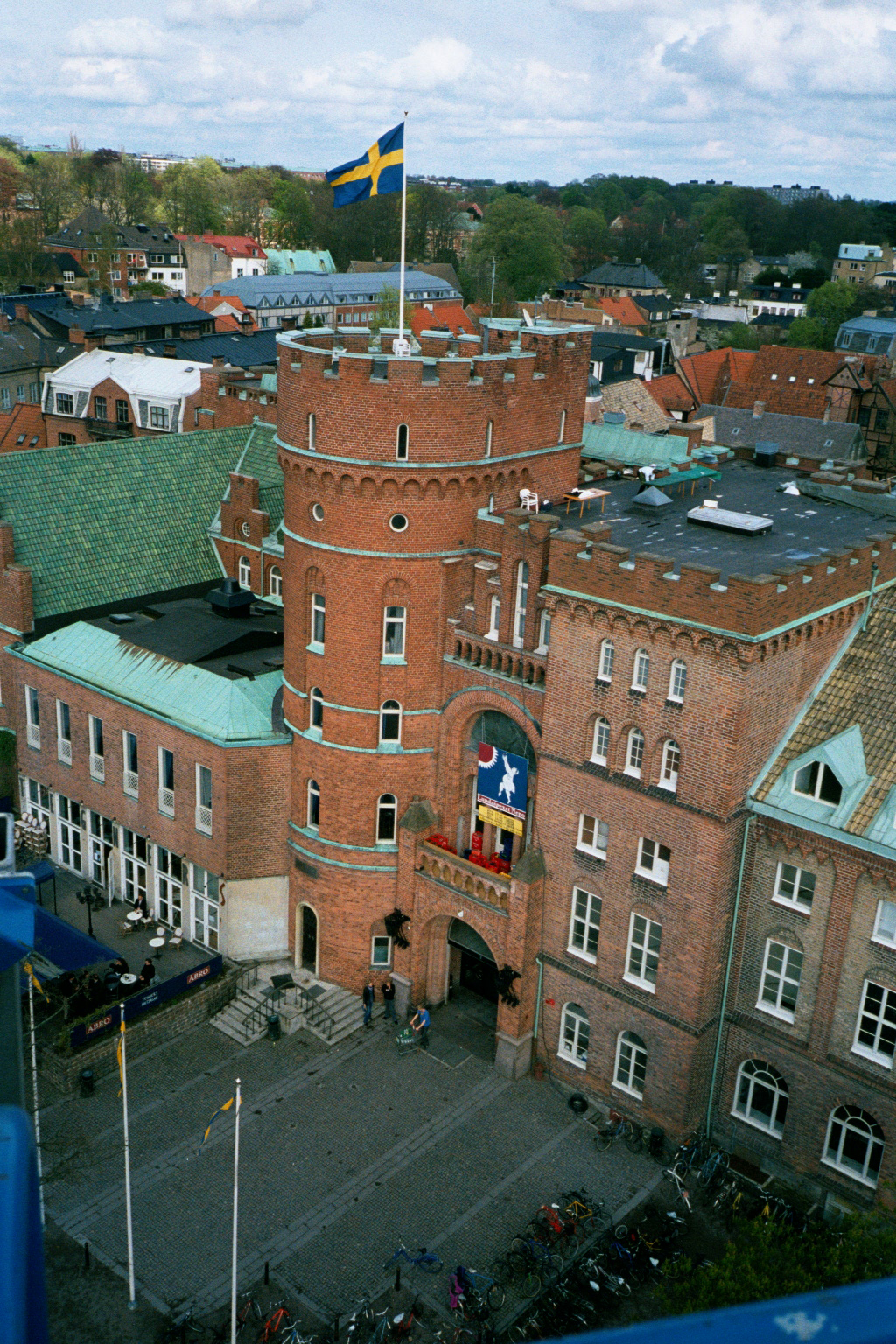
AF-borgen, the student-run complex at the heart of student life in Lund, May 2002

Lund student life is based on three central structures: the student nations, the Academic Society (AF) and the student unions. Until 1 July 2010, students were required to enroll in a student union, nation and AF in order to receive grades at the university, but this is no longer compulsory. Students may still enroll in these organizations if they wish.

=== Student nations ===
The nations in Lund are a central part of the university's history, initially serving as residential colleges for students, organized by geographic origin. Östgöta Nation, the oldest nation, was established in 1668, two years after the university was founded. While the nations still offer limited housing, today they are best described as student societies.

Today students may enroll in any nation, although the nations still preserve their geographic names. In most cases, it does not matter what nation one enrolls in, but different nations offer different activities for interested students.

Each nation has student housing, but the accommodations in no way meet demand, and they are usually appointed according to a queue system. Most nations tend to have at least one pub evening per week, with a following night club. The solemn peak event in the course of an activity year is the organization of student balls once a year. Most well known of the nation balls (as opposed to balls organized by student unions) is the ball hosted by Göteborgs Nation - called the "Gustaf II Adolf Ball" (also known as the "GA-Ball"). Most nations also host at least one banquet per week, where a three-course dinner is served. Each nation also has different activities based on students' interests. All activities within the nations are run by volunteer workers.

=== The Academic Society ===
In 1830, Professor Carl Adolph Agardh formed Akademiska Föreningen (The Academic Society), commonly referred to as AF, with the goal of "developing and cultivating the academic life" by bringing students and faculty from all departments and student nations together in one organization. Prince Oscar, then Sweden's Chancellor of Education, donated 2000 Kronor to help found the society. In 1848, construction began on AF-borgen (the AF Fortress), which is located opposite the Main Building in Lundagård. To this day, AF is the center of student life in Lund, featuring many theater companies, mainly spexes and Lund's Student Theater, a prize-winning student radio (Radio AF), and organizing the enormous Lundakarnevalen (the Lund Carnival) every four years. "AF Bostäder", an independent foundation with close ties to Akademiska Föreningen, maintains over 5,700 student residences in Lund.

=== Student unions ===
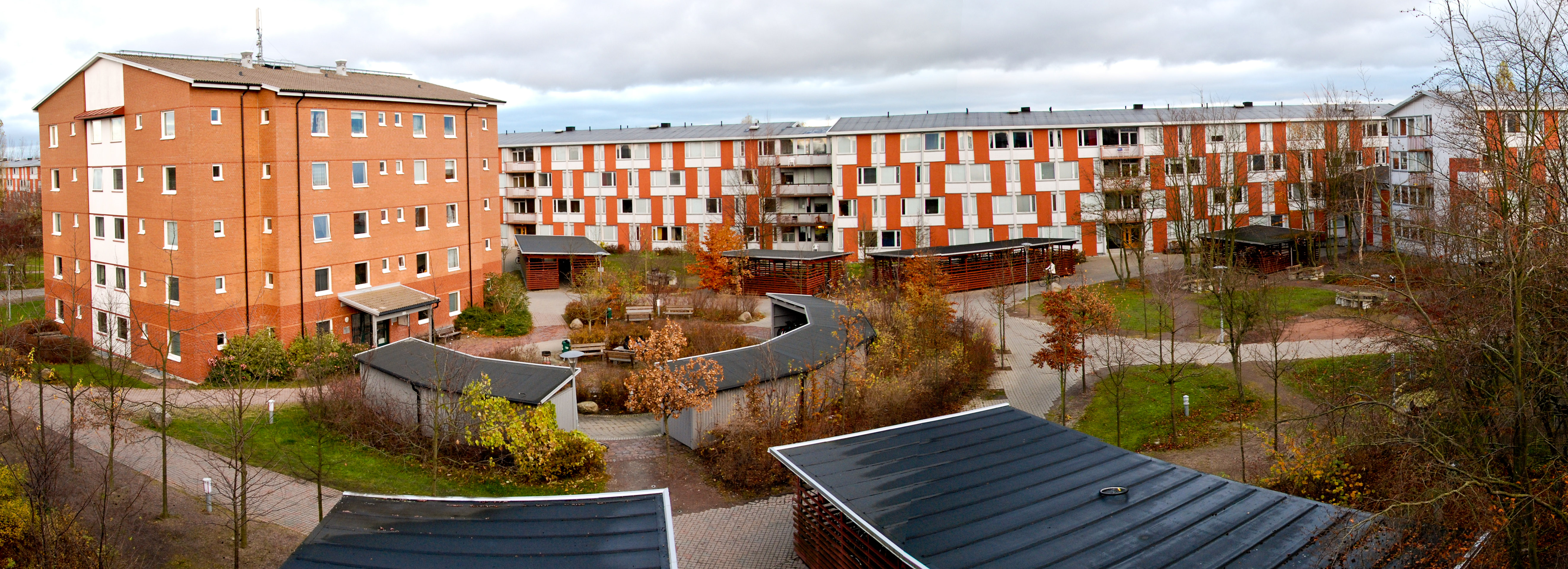
The Delphi residential area, located in the northern part of Lund, is one of the large student housing complexes run by AF Bostäder.

The student unions represent students in various decision-making boards within the university and counsel students regarding their rights, housing and career options. There are nine student unions, one for each faculty and an additional union for doctoral students. Lund's Doctoral Student Union is further divided into councils, one for each faculty except for the faculties of engineering and fine and performing arts.

The unions are incorporated into the Association of Lund University Student Unions (LUS). It has two full-time representatives who go to weekly meetings with the vice-chancellor and other organizational university bodies. The student union association runs services such as a loan institute, a day-care center and a website with housing information. It also publishes the monthly Lundagård magazine.

== Notable people ==
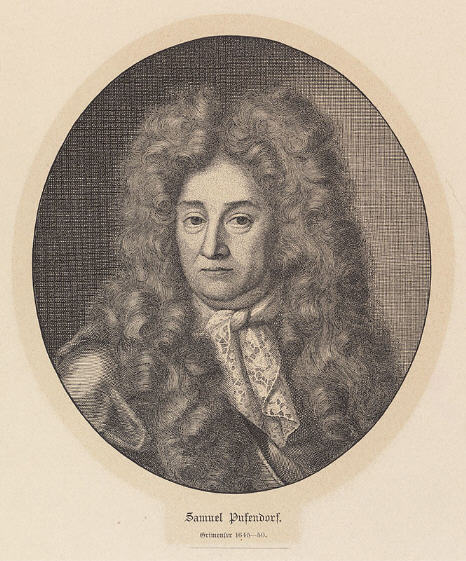
Samuel von Pufendorf

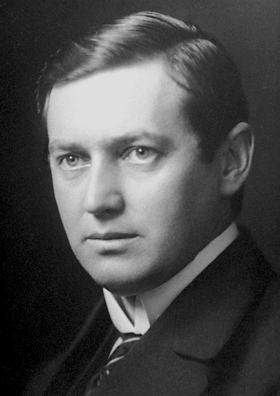
Karl Manne Siegbahn, Nobel Prize in Physics

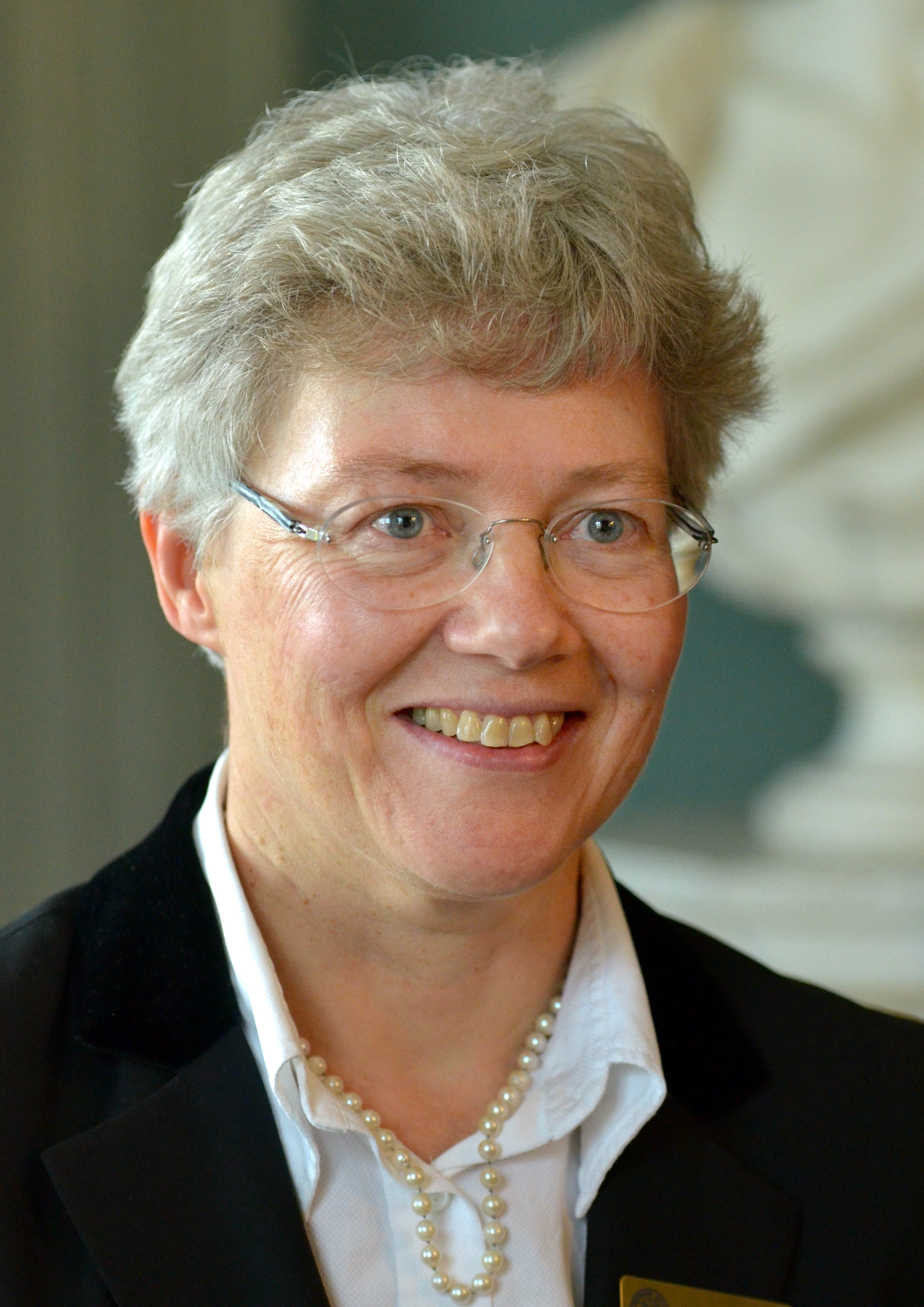
Anne L'Huillier, Nobel Prize in Physics

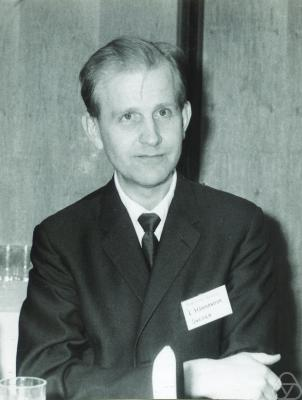
Lars Hörmander, Fields Medal in 1962

Alumni and faculty of Lund University are associated with, among other things: five Nobel Prizes, a Fields Medal, the creation of the first implantable pacemaker, the development of echocardiography, the spread of modern physiotherapy, the discovery of the role of dopamine as an independent neurotransmitter, the determination of the number of chromosomes of man, the establishment of osseointegration, the development of the Bluetooth technology, and the development of the modern-day medical ventilator.

The following is a selected list of some notable people who have been affiliated with Lund University as students or academics.

=== Humanities and economics ===
Samuel Pufendorf (1632–1694) was a notable jurist and philosopher known for his natural law theories, influencing Adam Smith as well as Thomas Jefferson. Olof von Dalin (1708–1763) was an influential Swedish writer and historian of the late enlightenment era. Peter Wieselgren (1800–1877) was a Swedish priest, literature critic and prominent leader of the Swedish temperance movement. Knut Wicksell (1851–1926) was an influential economist, sometimes considered one of the founders of modern macroeconomics. Oscar Olsson (1877–1950) was an important developer of self-education in Sweden and known as the father of study circles. Bertil Ohlin (1899–1979) received the Nobel Prize in economic sciences in 1977 for theories concerning international trade and capital, and was the leader of the Liberal's Peoples Party (Folkpartiet) for 23 years. Gunnar Jarring (1907–2002) was Sweden's ambassador in UN 1956–1958, and Sweden's ambassador in Washington DC 1958–1964. Britta Holmström (1911–1992) was the founder of Individuell Människohjälp (IM), a human rights organization with activities in 12 countries. Torsten Hägerstrand (1916–2004) was an internationally renowned geographer, considered the father of 'time geography' and receiver of the Lauréat Prix International de Géographie Vautrin Lud in 1992. Judith Wallerstein (1921–2012) was a renowned psychologist and internationally recognized authority on the effects of marriage and divorce on children and their parents. The first person from Iceland to earn a degree in archaeology, Ólafía Einarsdóttir, studied for her MA and PhD at Lund.

=== Biology and medicine ===
Carl Linnaeus (1707–1778), began his academic career in Lund by studying medicine and botany for a year before moving to Uppsala. He is known as the father of modern taxonomy, and is also considered one of the fathers of modern ecology. Pehr Henrik Ling (1776–1839) is considered the prime developer of natural gymnastics, the father of Swedish massage, and one of the most important contributors to the development and spread of modern physical therapy. Carl Adolph Agardh (1787–1859) made important contributions to the study of algae and played an important role as a politician in raising educational standards in Sweden. Elias Magnus Fries (1794–1878) was a notable botanist who played a prominent role in the creation of the modern taxonomy of mushrooms. Nils Alwall (1904–1986) was a pioneer in hemodialysis who constructed the first practical dialysis machine, commercialized by The Gambro Company. Rune Elmqvist (1906–1996) was a physician and medical engineer who developed the first implantable pacemaker as well as the first inkjet ECG printer. Lars Leksell (1907–1986) was a notable neurosurgeon who was the father of radiosurgery and later the inventor of the Gamma Knife. Inge Edler (1911–2001) developed the medical ultrasonography in 1953, commonly known as echocardiography, together with Hellmuth Hertz, and was awarded the Lasker Clinical Medical Research Award in 1977. Sune Bergström (1916–2004) and Bengt Samuelsson (1934–2024) were awarded the Nobel Prize in Physiology or Medicine in 1982 for "discoveries concerning prostaglandins and related biologically active substances". Arvid Carlsson (1923–2018) was awarded the Nobel Prize in Physiology or Medicine in 2000 for "discoveries concerning signal transduction in the nervous system" and is noted for having discovered the role of dopamine as an independent neurotransmitter.

=== Mathematics, engineering and physical sciences ===
Per Georg Scheutz (1785–1873) was a Swedish lawyer, publicist and inventor who created the first working programmable difference engine with a printing unit. Martin Wiberg (1826–1905) was a prolific inventor who, among many things, created the first difference engine the size of the sewing machine that could calculate and print logarithmic tables. Johannes Rydberg (1854–1919) was a renowned physicist famous for the Rydberg formula and the Rydberg constant. Carl Charlier (1862–1934) was an internationally acclaimed astronomer who made important contributions to astronomy as well as statistics and was awarded the James Craig Watson Medal in 1924 and the Bruce Medal in 1933. Manne Siegbahn (1886–1978), a student of Rydberg, was awarded the Nobel Prize in Physics 1924 for his discoveries and research in the field of X-ray spectroscopy. Oskar Klein (1894–1977) was an internationally renowned theoretical physicist famous for the Klein-Kaluza theory, the Klein-Gordon equation, and the Klein-Nishina formula. Pehr Edman (1916–1977) was a renowned biochemist who developed a method for sequencing proteins, known as the Edman degradation, and has been called the father of modern biochemistry. Hellmuth Hertz (1920–1990) developed the echocardiography together with Inge Edler (see above), and was also the first to develop the inkjet technology of printing. Lars Hörmander (1931–2012) is sometimes considered the foremost contributor to the modern theory of linear partial differential equations and received the Fields Medal in 1962 for his early work on equations with constant coefficients. Karl Johan Åström (1934–) is a notable control theorist, who in 1993 was awarded the IEEE Medal of Honor for "fundamental contributions to theory and applications of adaptive control technology". Sven Mattisson (1955–) is an electrical engineer who was one of the developers of the Bluetooth technology. In 2023, Anne L'Huillier (1958-), professor since 1997, was awarded the Nobel Prize in Physics for her work in attosecond physics. Danish structural chemist, crystallographer and scientific director Sine Larsen was interim acting director for MAX-Lab during the transition to the MAX IV Laboratory.

=== Politics and law ===
Rutger Macklean (1742–1816) was a prominent captain, politician and land owner remembered for introducing agricultural reforms leading to more effective large-scale farming in Sweden. Ernst Wigforss (1881–1977) was Sweden's finance minister 1925–1926 and 1932–1949 and has been considered the 'foremost developer of the Swedish Social Democracy'. Östen Undén (1886–1974) was an internationally recognized professor of law and Sweden's minister of foreign affairs 1924–1926 and 1945–1962. Tage Erlander (1901–1985) was Sweden's prime minister 1945–1969, potentially a record of uninterrupted tenure in parliamentary democracies, and led his party through eleven elections. Ingvar Carlsson (1934–) served as Sweden's prime minister 1986–1991 and 1994–1996 and as Sweden's deputy prime minister 1982–1986. Rupiah Banda (1937–2022) was the president of Zambia 2008–2011 and its vice president 2006–2008. Leif Silbersky (1938–2024) was a notable lawyer and author famous for representing so-called high-profile cases in Sweden. Marianne Lundius (1949–) was between 2010 and 2016 the president of the Supreme court of Sweden, the first female justice in this position. Utoni Nujoma (1952–) was Namibia's minister of foreign affairs 2010–2012 and is since 2012 the country's minister of justice.

=== Literature and culture ===
Thomas Thorild (1759–1808) was a notable Swedish writer, poet, and philosopher who, among many things, was an early proponent of gender equality. Esaias Tegnér (1782–1846) was an influential writer, poet, bishop and professor of the Greek language, perhaps most famous for his work Frithiofs Saga. Viktor Rydberg (1828–1895) was a notable journalist, writer and researcher, most famous for his works Tomten and Singoalla and regarded as one of Sweden's most important authors of the 19th century. Frans G Bengtsson (1894–1954) was a Swedish writer and poet famous for his novels The Long Ships (Röde Orm) which have been translated to at least 23 languages. Fritiof Nilsson Piraten (1895–1972) was a Swedish lawyer and popular author, known for his works Bombi Bitt och Jag and Bock i Örtagård. Hjalmar Gullberg (1898–1961) was a notable writer and poet who was also the head of the Swedish Radio Theatre 1936–1950. Ivar Harrie (1899–1973) was one of the founders of the newspaper Expressen, as well as its editor in chief 1944–1960. Elisabet Wentz-Janacek (1923 – 2014) was a composer and musicologist who mapped 20,000 different melody variants for Swedish hymns and helped create the Swedish Choral Registrar. Hans Alfredsson (1931–2017) was a Swedish comedian, author and actor, sometimes regarded as the foremost representative of the so-called Lundahumorn (the humor from Lund). Agnes von Rosen was a bullfighter and stunt performer who spent most of her later years in Mexico. Axwell (Born as Axel Christofer Hedfors, 1977–) is a world-renowned DJ, perhaps best known as a member of the trio the Swedish House Maffia. Elisabet Wentz-Janacek was a musicologist, organist, and major contributor to the Swedish Choral Registrar.

=== Business and entrepreneurship ===
Hans Rausing (1926–2019) was the managing director of Tetra Pak 1954–1985, the company's chairman 1985–1993, and has been ranked as the third richest man in Sweden. Pehr G. Gyllenhammar (1935–) is a businessman who was the CEO and chairman of Volvo 1971–1983 and 1983–1993 respectively, the chairman of Procordia 1990–1992, Aviva 1998–2005, Investment AB Kinnevik 2004–2007, and is the current vice chairman of Rothschild Europe. Bertil Hult (1941–) founded EF Education from his dormitory in Lund and was the company's CEO until 2002 and chairman until 2008. Olof Stenhammar (1941–) is a Swedish financier and businessman who founded Optionsmäklarna, OM, which later changed its name to OMX and today is a part of the NASDAQ OMX Group. Michael Treschow (1943–) is the current chairman of Unilever and was the CEO of Atlas Copco and Elektrolux 1991–1998 and 1998–2002 respectively, as well as the chairman of Ericsson 2002–2011. Stefan Persson (1947–) was the CEO of H&M 1982–1997 and has been the company's chairman since 1998 and has been ranked among the top ten richest men in the world. Dan Olofsson (1950–) is a Swedish entrepreneur and philanthropist who founded the company Sigma and the foundation Star for Life and is a large shareholder in the company ÅF. Anders Dahlvig (1957–) was the CEO and President of the IKEA group between 1999 and 2009, during which IKEA experienced an average growth of 11 percent, and is the current chairman of the New Wave Group. Charlotta Falvin (1966–) is a Swedish businesswoman who is the chairman of the companies Teknopol, Barista, Multi-Q and Ideon AB and the previous CEO of TAT and Decuma. Ann-Sofie Johansson is the Creative Advisor and former Head of Design for fashion retailer H&M. Cristina Stenbeck (1977–) is a Swedish businesswoman who is the current chairman of Investment AB Kinnevik.

== Partner universities ==
Lund University cooperates with universities on all continents, both in areas of research and student exchange.

Partners include the University of California system, The University of North Carolina, Nanyang Technological University, Heidelberg University, the University of Tokyo and the University of Texas.

Apart from being a member of the LERU and Universitas 21 networks, the university participates in the European Erasmus and Nordplus programs. It also coordinates several intercontinental projects, mostly through the Erasmus Mundus program.

The university is an active member of the University of the Arctic. UArctic is an international cooperative network based in the Circumpolar Arctic region, consisting of more than 200 universities, colleges, and other organizations with an interest in promoting education and research in the Arctic region.

== See also ==
- Fernström Prize
- List of early modern universities in Europe
- Open Access Scholarly Publishers Association, of which Lund University Library is a member
- Projekt Sex
- Royal Swedish Physiographic Society in Lund

== Notes ==
^Note a Prepared for both the book and the sword – to study and to defend the country in times of war. The lion in Lund University's seal holds a book in one hand, and a sword in the other.
