= Lund University Main Building =

Building in Lund, Sweden

- Universitetshuset i Lund
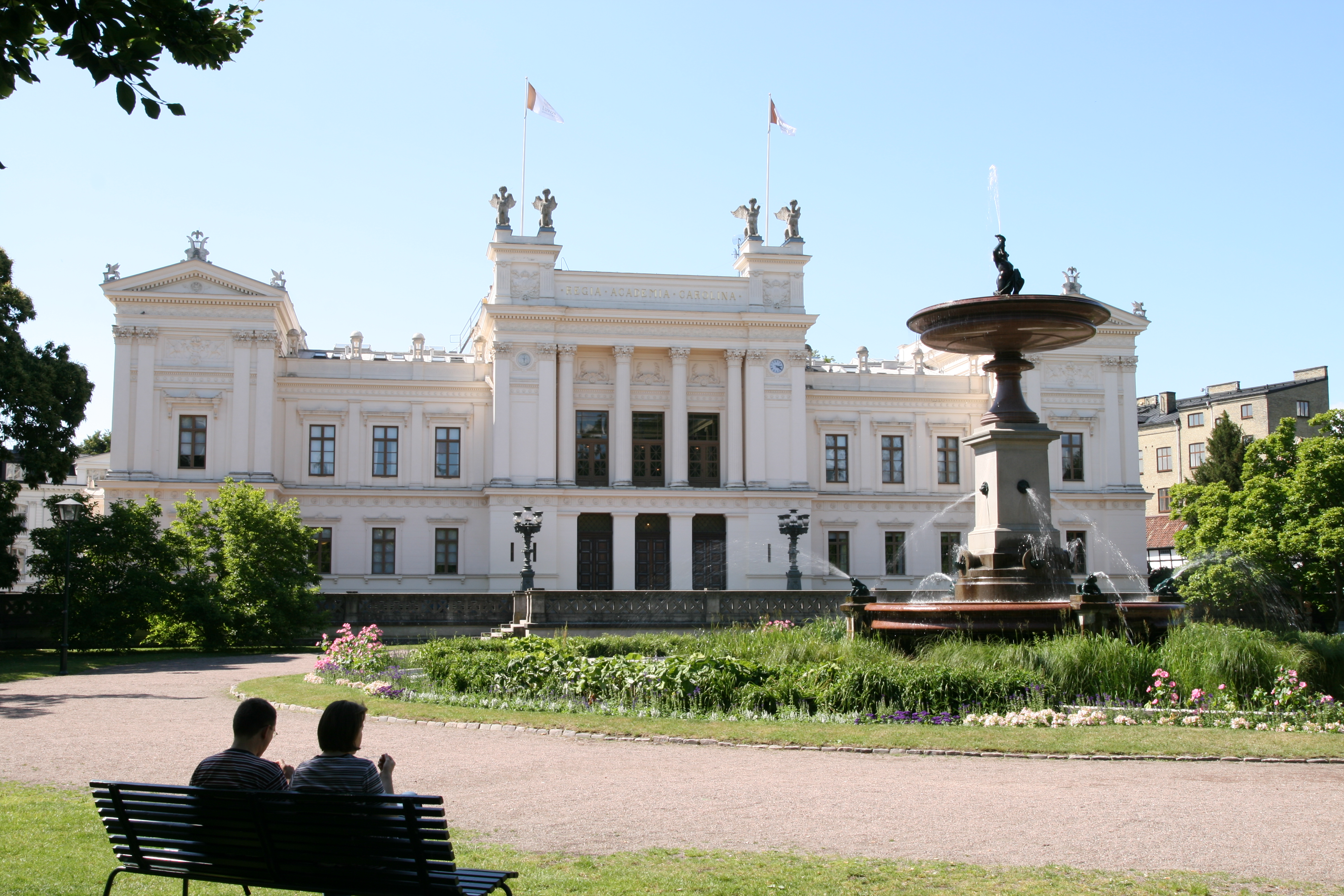
- The main building of the University of Lund
- Interactive map of the Lund University Main Building area

General information
- Type: Building
- Location: 55°42′21″N 13°11′36″E, Sweden
- Opened: 1882
- Owner: Government of Sweden through National Property Board

Technical details
- Material: concrete, bricks

Design and construction
- Architect: Helgo Zettervall

Website
- Universitetshuset, Lund

The main building of the Lund University (Universitetshuset in Swedish) was designed by architect Helgo Zettervall and inaugurated by King Oscar II in 1882. Construction began in 1874, when the old main building Kungshuset had become too small for the growing number of students.

The design is characterised by Zettervall's fascination with classical antiquity, and features columns and fancy copings. There were originally four sphinxes on the roof, but they had to be removed within 30 years because of bad quality. In the 1990s, four new sphinxes were placed on the roof.

Like many of Zettervall's buildings, it was criticized for a lack of uniformity and not being well thought out.

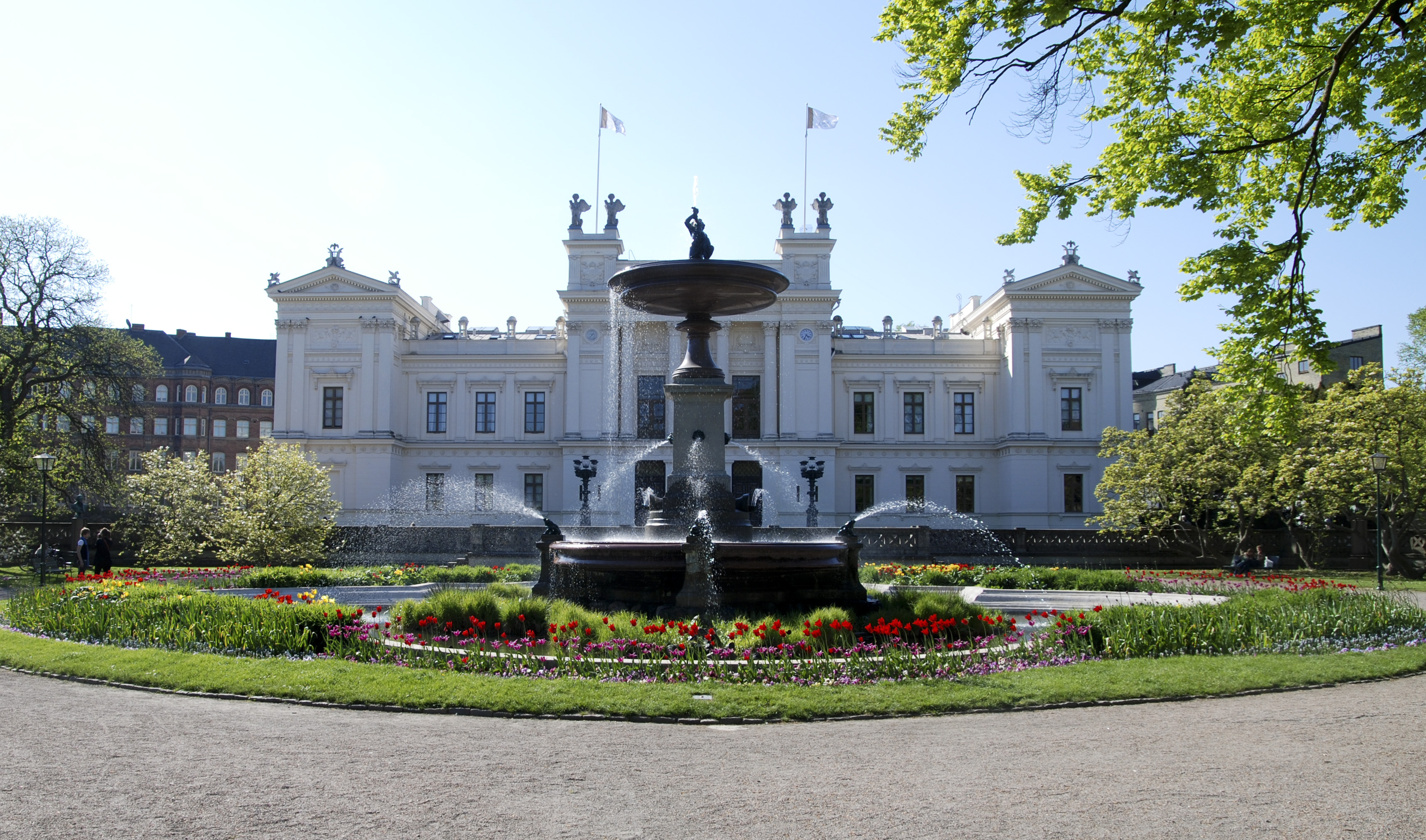
Front

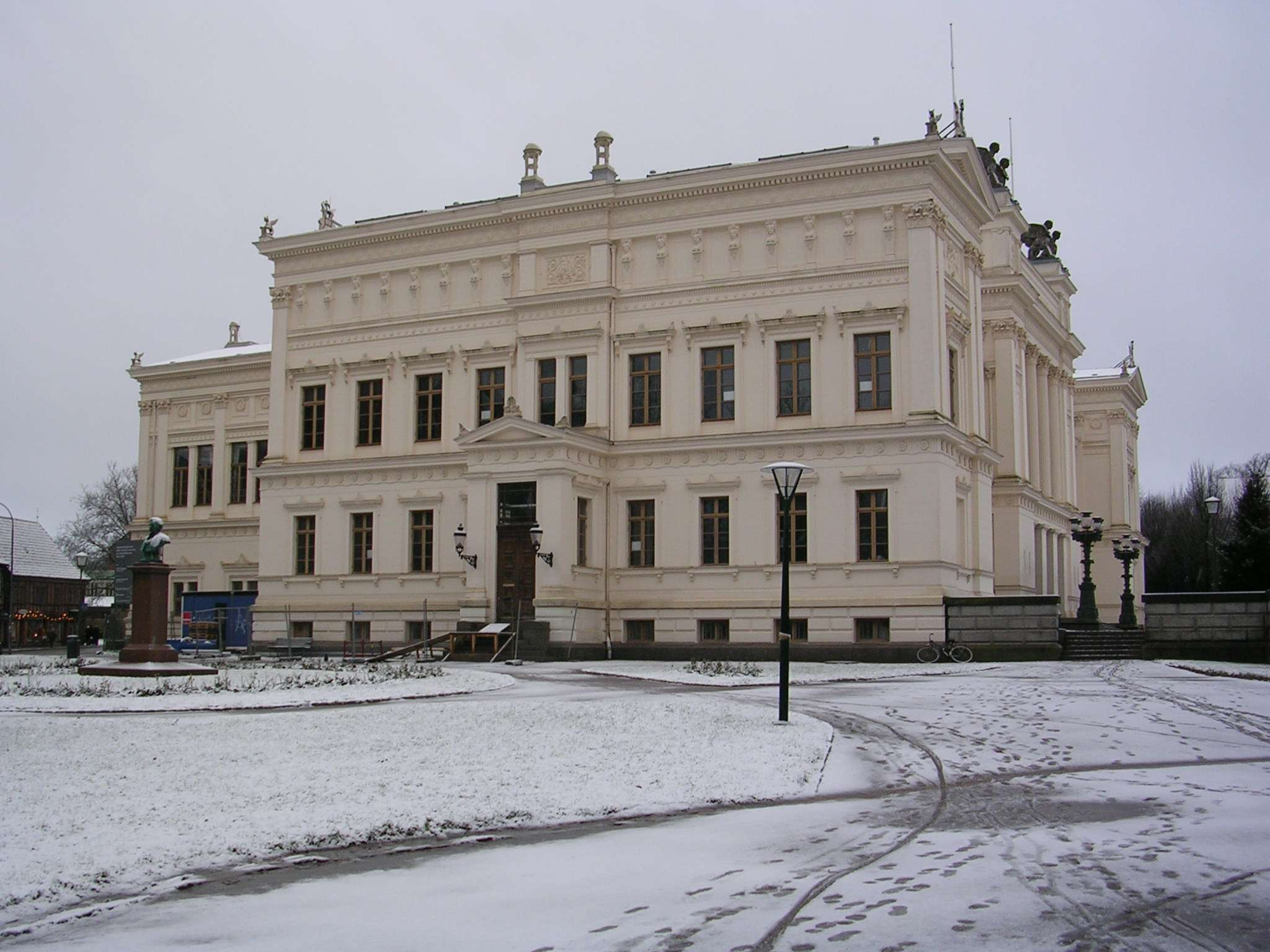
South side

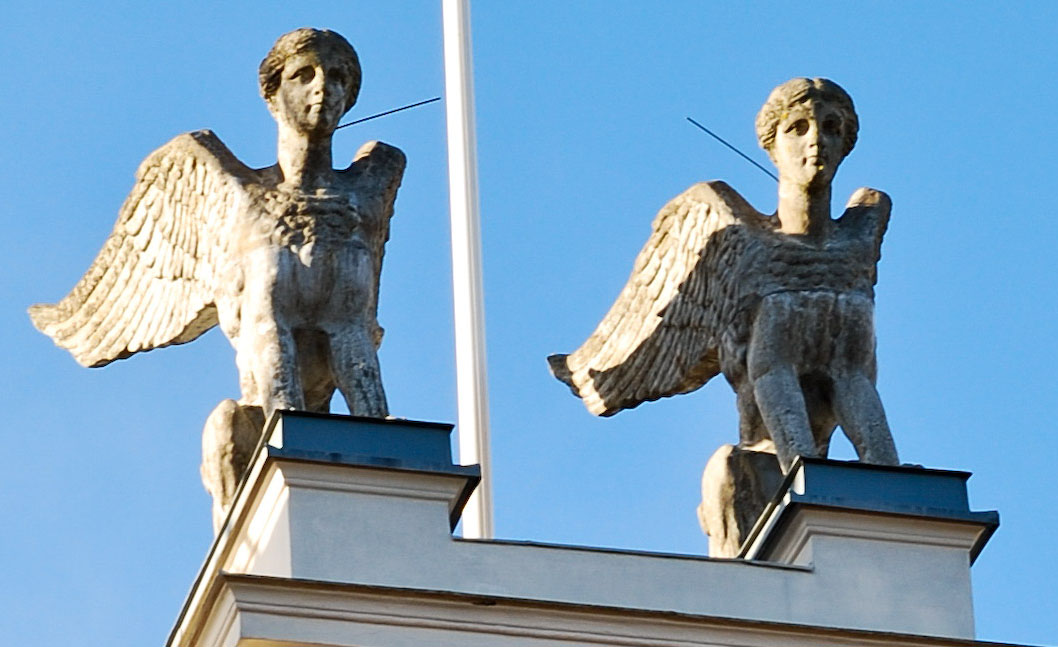
Sphinxes
