= Radio AF 99.1 =

Student radio station in Sweden

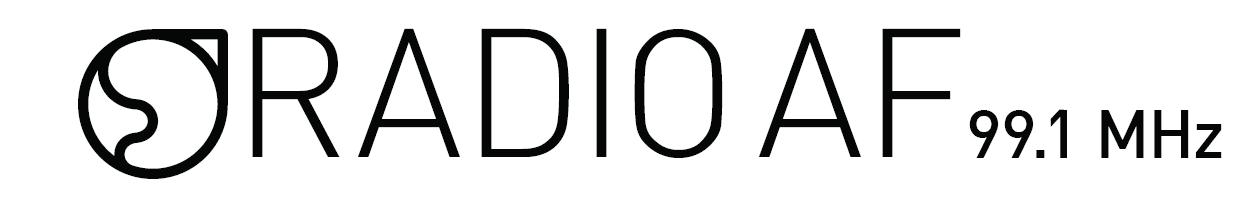
Radio AF - Lunds studentradio

Radio AF in Lund, Sweden, is the largest student radio station in Scandinavia, and the second largest in Europe.

Radio AF started broadcasting November 1, 1982. It broadcasts news aimed at the students at Lund University, and a wide variety of music. Radio AF was the start of the career of many Swedish radio personalities and comedians. The current station manager is Ivar Harby Samuelsson. The station used to broadcast analog radio in the Lund area on 99.1 MHz and 91.1 MHz, but has since June 2014 moved on to round-the-clock broadcasting and podcasting via the official website.

== About ==
Radio AF is run by volunteering students and has a continuous 24 hour broadcast. The programming varies from music, news, comedy, talk shows and entertainment.

== History ==
The city of Lund was given permission to start community radio broadcasting in 1982 and began broadcasts November 1, the same year. Among the first that went on air was Lunds Studentkår, the student body of Lund, and Akademiska Föreningen, the academic society, both combined under the name Radio LSAF. They broadcast more than eight hours a week, mainly music and student information. After a project under the name Radio P4 in the summer of 1984 along with Radio TLTH and Radio Concorde, the three stations joined under the name Radio AF.

One of the objectives of the project was to influence public opinion in the direction of a less restricted and more free radio climate, which led to 40,000 signatures in support of commercial advertisements on the newly started Radio P4.

Radio AF/P4 then continued throughout the eighties, calling themselves Radio P4 in the summer, with a more youthful profile, and Radio AF during the semesters, with focus on student information. Many of Sweden's biggest radio personalities originate from this time.

In June 1991, Radio AF moved to its current premises in the AF-building, centrally located in Lund, and began broadcasting on frequency 99.1 MHz. In 2014 the station aimed for an all digital approach to the content provided, and designed a new official site to further the programming of the channel digitally.

== Station management ==
Station manager	Assistant station manager	Date
Ivar Harby Samuelsson	Elin von Vultée Widtfelt, Viktor Ferdinand Kovács	Fall 2025
André Krisping	Elin von Vultée Widtfelt	Spring 2025
André Krisping	Frida Johannisson	Fall 2024
Li Brundell	Elin Hilling	Spring 2024
Li Brundell	Jennifer Garpvall	Fall 2023
Daniel Solvold	Li Brundell	Fall 2022
Lovike Cedervall	Li Brundell	Spring 2022
Lovike Cedervall	Oskar Andreasson	Fall 2021
Hanna Viberg	Oskar Andreasson	Spring 2021
Hanna Viberg	Alexander Johansson	Fall 2020
Vincent Wilhelmsson	Alexander Johansson	Spring 2020
Vincent Wilhelmsson	Julia Karlsson	Fall 2019
Kajsa Oscarsson	Julia Karlsson	Spring 2019
Kajsa Oscarsson	Johan Christiansen	Fall 2018
Annie Gunnarsson	Adam Olofson	July 2017 - June 2018
Axel Eriksson	Adam Hallberg	Spring 2017
Axel Eriksson	Klara Kylhammar	2016
Lina Asp	Julia Wikström	Fall 2015
Mattias Torstensson	Lina Asp	Spring 2015
Mattias Torstensson	Hanna Nyberg	Fall 2014
Erik Adell	Mikaela Månsson	Spring 2014
Erik Adell	Frida Tranvik	Fall 2013
Aron Klingberg	Frida Tranvik	Spring 2013
Aron Klingberg	Christofer Carlsson	2012
