= Gävle fishermen =

Name for fishermen from the Swedish city of Gävle

The Gävle fishermen (Swedish: Gävlefiskarna) were fishermen from the Swedish town of Gävle who specialized in herring fishing along the Norrland coast from the 15th to the 19th centuries. From 1557 to 1776, they held a monopoly, granted by the Swedish monarchy, which encompassed all fishing activities along the coastline, extending over approximately 2000 kilometers. The Gävle fishermen established and maintained fishing villages along the coast where they conducted their fishing operations. Their primary residences, however, remained in Gävle. Every year, the fishing families sailed to their village in the spring, fished there during the summer, and sold the produced salted herring at markets in central Sweden in the fall. The Gävle fishermen's long-distance voyages faced increasing competition from other fishermen, and this led to a decline in such practices starting from the late 16th century. The tradition of these voyages eventually came to an end, marked by the last documented trip undertaken by Erik August Grellson and Erik Wilhelm Högberg to Trysunda in 1899.

== History ==
=== Beginnings ===
In the early 15th century, fishermen originating from central Swedish towns, notably Gävle, initiated extended journeys along the Norrland coast with the primary aim of herring fishing. Crucial advancements in fish processing techniques, particularly salting, played a pivotal role in enabling these long-distance voyages. Until the 14th century, people ate Baltic herring fresh or dried. However, a significant shift occurred when Lübeck merchants began exporting salt from the Lüneburg saltworks to regions in Scandinavia with lower salt availability. This transformation elevated the importance of fishing in these areas. Notably, the Hanseatic League played a significant role in marketing salted herring as a Lenten dish throughout Europe.

Located at the mouth of the Gavleån River in the Gulf of Bothnia, Gävle was originally a small fishing village, that received a town charter from King Christopher III in 1446. Initially, Gävle fishermen competed with those from towns further south for the best fishing spots. However, a significant turning point occurred in 1557 when they were accorded an exclusive privilege by King Gustav Wasa to engage in fishing activities along the Norrland coast. In return for this privilege, they paid a tax to the crown, amounting to every tenth ton of salted herring. By 1559, the community of Gävle fishermen had expanded, comprising 149 fishermen located in various fishing villages, primarily along the Ångermanland coast. Their combined catch for that year reached 340 barrels of herring.

=== Competition from other fishermen and decline ===
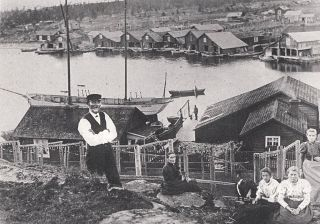
Familie Grellson in Trysunda, 1895

During the late 16th and early 17th centuries, a period of significant change and competition unfolded in the fishing industry of Norrland. Newly established towns north of Gävle sought to assert control over the lucrative fishing grounds, sparking disputes and occasional conflicts between the Gävle fishermen and their rivals. In 1623, the town of Sundsvall was granted access by the crown to some of the most productive fishing grounds in Medelpad. As part of this arrangement, the Gävle fishermen were permitted to continue using the harbors, albeit in exchange for rent. Among these harbors, the fishing village of Ulvöhamn emerged as a crucial hub, facilitating trade and serving as a pivotal link between Stockholm and northern Sweden. Despite certain trade restrictions, local farmers engaged in an illegal exchange, primarily involving the purchase of salt. However, the citizens of Härnösand, desiring control over this lucrative trade, successfully lobbied for a prohibition in 1646. Nonetheless, both fishermen and farmers found ways to circumvent the ban. In 1668, King Charles XI responded to petitions from the citizens of Härnösand by imposing a decree obliging Gävle fishermen to visit Härnösand in the spring and autumn, subjecting them to inspections there. This arrangement aimed to limit the transport of goods beyond the necessary salt for spring salting and equivalent quantities of salted herring in the fall. The Gävle fishermen, however, voiced complaints to the king regarding the time-consuming inspections. As a resolution, beginning in 1675, inspectors were dispatched from Härnösand to the fishing villages to conduct visits, effectively putting an end to illegal trade practices. This change was also driven by the substantial fines imposed for violating the law, leading to a cessation of illegal trade around 1700. By 1701, Gävle fishermen had discontinued their long-distance voyages to Medelpad due to the escalating competition from fishermen based in Sundsvall. Some Gävle fishermen redirected their efforts to other fishing villages further north, while others settled in Medelpad. Consequently, their numbers declined to 71 by 1737, and they frequented fewer fishing villages, which were situated even farther north than in the early 17th century.

In 1766, a significant change occurred when the king abolished the water regime, restoring fishing rights to landowners. This decision marked the end of the Gävle fishermen's exclusive privilege to fish across Norrland. Consequently, they were compelled to lease their former fishing villages, and fishing activities continued for approximately another century. However, in October 1802, Gävle fishermen faced one of the most tragic incidents in their history. During this period, a devastating storm struck as three fishermen and their families were returning to Gävle. Tragically, their boat capsized off the coast of Åland, leading to the loss of all seventeen occupants.

The decline of fishing trips had many causes, one of the main reasons was the stronger competition from other fishermen. Many of the Gävle fishermen originally came from Ångermanland, their ancestors had moved to Gävle and become members of the citizenry there. Now more and more fishermen decided to settle down, often in their old fishing villages. The reasons were the desire for better housing and the construction of railroads from the west coast of Sweden to the east coast. There, the Gävle fishermen had previously sold their salt herring; with the railroad, fresh fish could be transported in large quantities and sold more cheaply than salt herring. Gävle's economy also became more and more oriented towards trade, and together with the beginning of industrialization, many workers were needed there. The last Gävle fishermen at the end of the 19th century were Erik August Grellson's family and Erik Wilhelm Högberg. They sailed to Trysunda for the last time in 1899. Högberg still sailed to Skeppsmalen every spring on a steamboat until 1914, fished there during the summer, and returned home to Gävle in the fall. When he died at Christmas 1914, the Gävle fishermen tradition ended for good.

== Spring voyage ==
The Gävle fishermen typically commenced their fishing trips around the transition between April and May, coinciding with the onset of the sea ice melting. The entire family, along with household servants, would gather for these journeys, and sometimes multiple families would embark together in a single boat. For the duration of the summer, they brought with them most of what they would require, including household items, provisions (including live animals), salt for the preservation of fish, and trade goods for interactions with the local population. While the fishermen brought their nets from Gävle and other tools to the fishing village during the winter, the barrels used for storing salted herring were not transported but instead crafted anew each summer. The journey covered distances of up to 350 kilometers and typically took one to two weeks, but according to tradition, individual fishermen were reputed to have covered this distance in as little as 48 hours when benefiting from favorable winds.

== Fishing villages ==
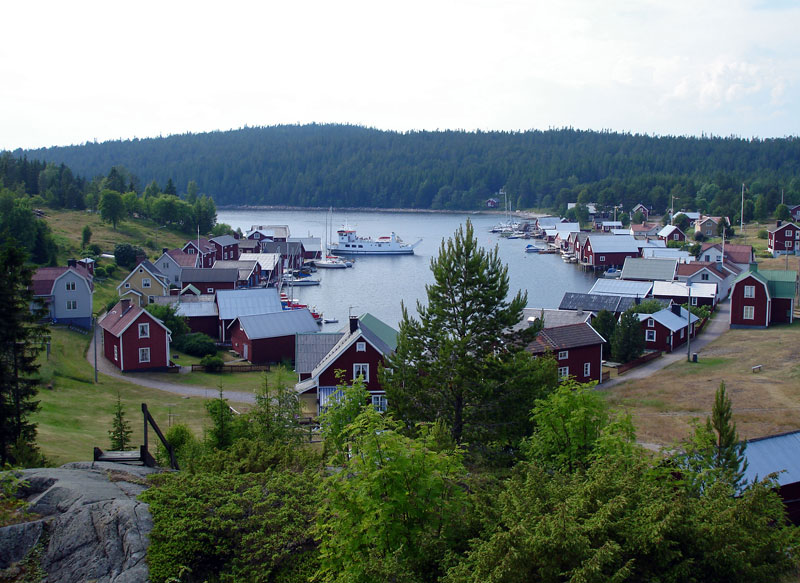
Trysunda, one of the oldest Gävle fishing villages.

Families traveling to their fishing villages brought along goats and sheep, with the occasional inclusion of pigs and cows. Goats held significant importance for the Gävle fishermen due to their role as milk providers, and many families owned multiple goats. Goats were preferred over cows for transport, as they were better suited to the modest conditions on the islands and were easier to transport. Pigs, while able to consume fish waste, resulted in slightly tainted meat consequently.

At the outset, the families of the fishermen resided in simple log houses featuring a single room and a fireplace built from natural stone. Furnishings were limited to essential items like beds, tables, and chairs. After each fishing trip, the fishermen would haul their boats ashore. As time progressed, houses became more elaborate, boasting multiple rooms and built from wooden boards. Nevertheless, their interiors remained rather modest. In a typical fishing village during the early 19th century, sheds encircled a bay, with boats resting on the adjacent beach and dwellings situated above them. Boathouses designed for shelter from inclement weather were only erected towards the end of the 19th century, with some of the older sheds being converted for this purpose. These sheds, oriented with their gables facing the water, served as storage spaces for vats, barrels, and tools. On the water-facing side, they featured docks for the loading and unloading of boats. Originally, these dwellings and sheds were unpainted; it was not until the early 20th century that they adopted the distinctive Falun red color.

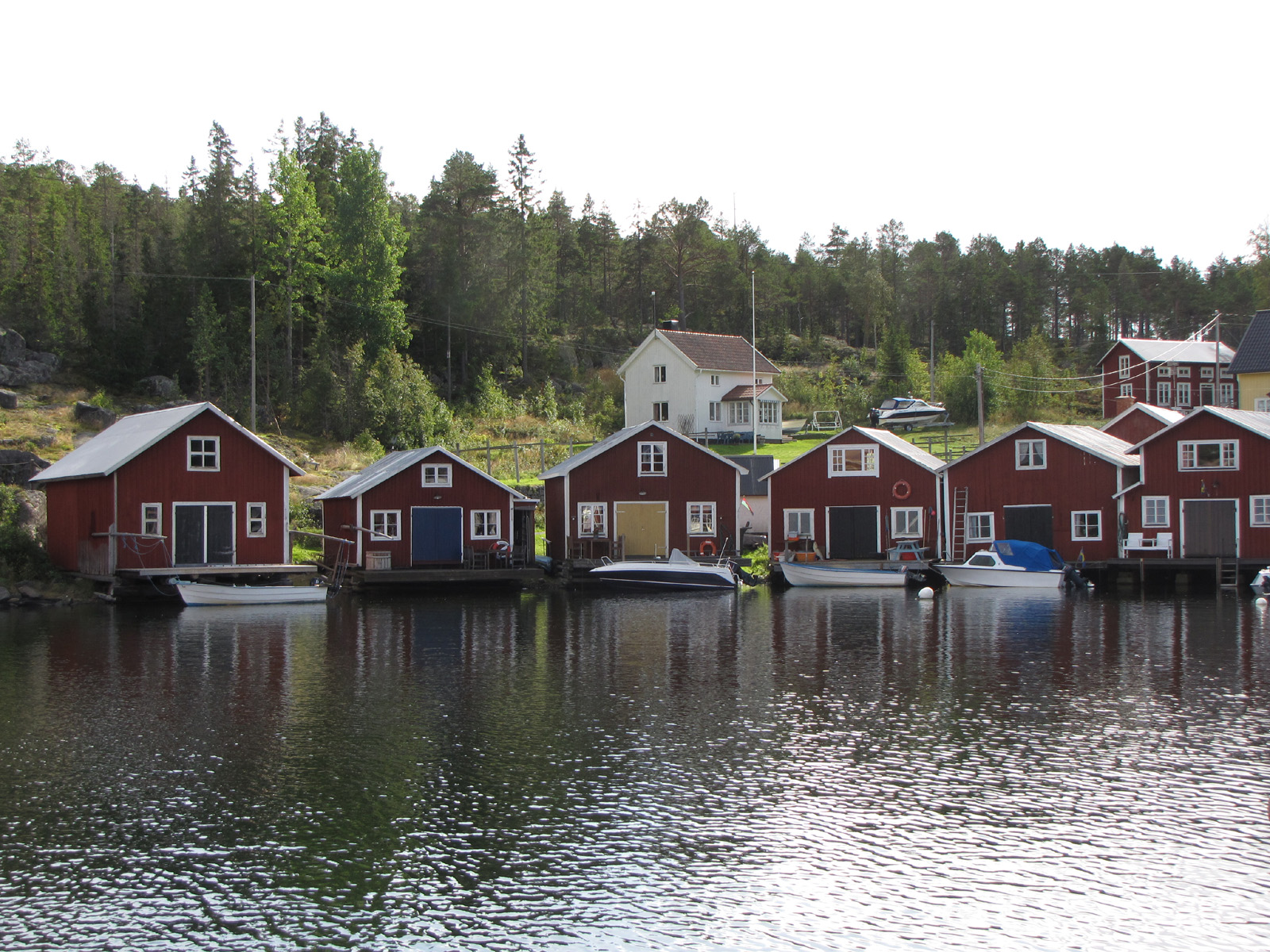
Boathouses in Bönhamn

Annually, during the spring, the fishermen of a village, collectively established regulations that were binding for all community members. These regulations encompassed various aspects, including fishing methods and assistance for the less fortunate residents. An elder was selected as the chairman of the fishermen, supported by several assessors. This governing body received legal recognition through an oath administered by the Landshövding (the highest-ranking official in a Swedish county). The primary responsibility of the elder was to ensure that all fishermen adhered to the established social norms. Violations, such as minor theft, altercations, or tampering with another fisherman's nets, could result in penalties or public exposure at the pillory. In the case of gross violations, the fisherman in question could be expelled from the fishing village, but in most cases, such cases were heard by ordinary courts. In 1852, the state implemented a judicial reform that abolished these village courts as part of efforts to centralize and standardize the legal system.

Within the fishing villages, the Gävle fishermen built small chapels, with Ulvö gamla kapell from 1622 being the oldest surviving example. These chapels served as places for communal gatherings, where the fishermen would convene every Sunday for prayer and scripture readings from the Bible. Given the considerable distance to the nearest church, parish priests made infrequent visits, often only a few times a year, to these remote villages. In addition to their function as prayer rooms, the chapels also had a practical use, in the absence of dedicated storage sheds in the fishing villages, they functioned as storage facilities for the fishermen's tools during the winter months.

The Gävle fishermen utilized a total of 87 fishing villages at various points in time. Predominantly, these villages, numbering 43 in total, were situated in Hälsingland, spanning the coastal region from Söderhamn to Sundsvall. As of around 1800, the distribution of fishing villages was mostly in Gästrikland and Ångermanland. The northernmost fishing villages with specified locations were found near Örnsköldsvik. There were likely additional fishing villages even further north, with several fishing families in Gävle originating from the Umeå region. Typically, these villages accommodated between three and ten families each. In the largest fishing village operated by the Gävle fishermen, Ulvöhamn, a maximum of 27 Gävle fishermen resided with their families in the year 1791. Below is a list of all 87 fishing villages utilized by the Gävle fishermen, arranged geographically from south to north, along with their respective parishes and provinces of location.

List of fishing villages

Fishing village	Parish	Provinces
Långsand	Älvkarleby	Uppland
Limön	Gävle	Gästrikland
Bönan	Gävle	Gästrikland
Utvalnäs	Gävle	Gästrikland
Eggegrund	Gävle	Gästrikland
Lövgrund	Gävle	Gästrikland
Vitgrund	Gävle	Gästrikland
Edsköklabb	Hille	Gästrikland
Iggön	Hille	Gästrikland
Säljemar	Hille	Gästrikland
Gåsholma	Hamrånge	Gästrikland
Axmarby	Hamrånge	Gästrikland
Kusökalv	Hamrånge	Gästrikland
Rävskär	Hamrånge	Gästrikland
Kalvhararna	Söderhamn	Hälsingland
Trollharen	Skog	Hälsingland
Kultebo	Söderala	Hälsingland
Storjungfrun	Söderhamn	Hälsingland
Maråker	Söderala	Hälsingland
Grimshararna	Söderhamn	Hälsingland
Skatön	Söderhamn	Hälsingland
Stålnäs	Norrala	Hälsingland
Prästgrundet	Söderhamn	Hälsingland
Sydosten	Norrala	Hälsingland
Sillören	Norrala	Hälsingland
Skärså	Norrala	Hälsingland
Karskär	Enånger	Hälsingland
Ravelsnäs	Enånger	Hälsingland
Bergön	Enånger	Hälsingland
Sörön	Enånger	Hälsingland
Fjäle	Enånger	Hälsingland
Vätnäs udde	Enånger	Hälsingland
Agön	Agö	Hälsingland
Kråkön	Agö	Hälsingland
Bergön	Rogsta	Hälsingland
Olmen	Hudiksvall	Hälsingland
Hölick	Rogsta	Hälsingland
Kuggörarna	Rogsta	Hälsingland
Arnö	Rogsta	Hälsingland
Bålsön	Rogsta	Hälsingland
Dråsviken	Rogsta	Hälsingland
Lakbäcken	Rogsta	Hälsingland
Rönnskär	Rogsta	Hälsingland
Stensjö	Rogsta	Hälsingland
Stockviken	Rogsta	Hälsingland
Sågtäkten	Rogsta	Hälsingland
Rönnskär	Harmånger	Hälsingland
Lönnånger	Jättendal	Hälsingland
Jättholmarna	Jättendal	Hälsingland
Vitöarna	Jättendal	Hälsingland
Härte	Jättendal	Hälsingland
Sörfjärden	Gnarp	Hälsingland
Vattingen	Gnarp	Hälsingland
Sladdhamn	Gnarp	Hälsingland
Bäcksand	Gnarp	Hälsingland
Fågelharen	Gnarp	Hälsingland
Ravelsnäs	Gnarp	Hälsingland
Skatan	Njurunda	Medelpad
Brämökalv	Njurunda	Medelpad
Brämön	Njurunda	Medelpad
Lörudden	Njurunda	Medelpad
Spikhamn	Alnö	Medelpad
Röhamn	Alnö	Medelpad
Åstaholmsudden	Tynderö	Medelpad
Storhamn	Tynderö	Medelpad
Skeppshamn	Tynderö	Medelpad
Balsviken	Häggdånger	Ångermanland
Svenskär	Häggdånger	Ångermanland
Hemsö	Hemsö	Ångermanland
Storön	Nora	Ångermanland
Berghamn	Nora	Ångermanland
Sörfällsviken	Nordingrå	Ångermanland
Barsta	Nordingrå	Ångermanland
Låssman	Nordingrå	Ångermanland
Bönhamn	Nordingrå	Ångermanland
Rävsön	Nordingrå	Ångermanland
Gnäggen	Nätra	Ångermanland
Norrfällsviken	Nordingrå	Ångermanland
Marviksgrunnan	Nätra	Ångermanland
Ulvöhamn	Nätra	Ångermanland
Sandviken	Nätra	Ångermanland
Trysunda	Nätra	Ångermanland
Grisslan	Själevad	Ångermanland
Skeppsmalen	Grundsunda	Ångermanland
Skagen	Grundsunda	Ångermanland
Långholmarna	Grundsunda	Ångermanland
Granö	Grundsunda	Ångermanland

== Catching and preservation methods ==
Fishing operations were conducted by small teams consisting of fishermen's sons and servants. During the summer months, family heads embarked on trade voyages along the Baltic coast, reaching as far as Gdansk and Königsberg, utilizing the family's larger vessel for this purpose. From spring until mid-July, the fishermen employed fine-mesh purse seines measuring approximately 15 meters in width and 90 meters in length in the bays near their fishing villages. This method of fishing relied on collective effort. A crew in a boat would take the net halfway into the water. Upon encountering a school of herring within the bay, they circled it before returning to the shore. Collaboratively, the fishermen gradually tightened the resulting loop until they could collectively bring the catch ashore. Starting from mid-July until the end of September, they engaged in open-sea fishing using standard nets, two fathoms in width. These nets were submerged in the seabed, weighted with stones, and kept upright with the assistance of floats. The process of setting the nets in the evening was a collective endeavor, with the fishermen returning to haul them in between three and four o'clock during the night. In addition to the primary catch, small quantities of salmon and eel were also procured to supplement the somewhat monotonous diet.

The preparation of salted herring was a collaborative effort between women and men. The process began with gutting the caught herring, followed by soaking it in a strong brine for a day. This step served to extract the blood from the fish's flesh, resulting in a whitened appearance. On the following day, after draining the brine from the fish using wooden baskets, the herring was stacked in vats and covered with salt. After approximately a week, the fish could be packed into barrels with brine for preservation. Another method of preserving herring was through the creation of surströmming, achieved by acidification. After gutting and washing the herring, it was allowed to thoroughly drain. Subsequently, the herring was mixed with salt and placed in barrels exposed to the sun for several weeks. This fermentation process preserved the fish. Fishermen earned an additional income by processing the herring's innards. These innards were soaked in brine for a day, then laid out on rocks to dry, and eventually sold to local farmers. The farmers used the offal as cattle feed.

== Sale and income ==
The fishermen sold their salt herring partially during the summer and autumn at local markets before their families returned to Gävle in early October. One of the significant markets in Ångermanland was located in Nätra, attracting residents, traveling merchants, and at times, Sami people. Nätra was renowned for its linen, and in exchange for salt herring, the Gävle fishermen received linen cloth, as well as items such as wood tar, various foodstuffs (including poultry), and, in earlier times, skins. From Gävle, the salt herring made its way to Bergslagen and Dalarna. Key trading locations for the Gävle fishermen included the annual midsummer and October markets in Älvkarleby. They seldom sold herring to Stockholm in the south, as competition from local fishermen there was not tolerated. The earnings from these sales were crucial for financing a significant portion of the fishermen's winter livelihood and the upcoming spring trip.

The catches of the fishermen varied significantly due to annual fluctuations in herring stocks. For instance, in 1742, a total of 6,500 barrels of salted herring were produced, but this number dropped to 2,700 the following year. Over the next few years, the quantity increased again to around 5,000 barrels, with the number of fishermen remaining relatively stable during this period. The peak production occurred in 1816 when 10,000 barrels of salted herring were produced annually. However, by 1839, the production had dropped to 2,048 barrels, with the 117 active fishermen producing an average of 17.5 barrels each. In 1844, 105 fishermen produced a total of 3,346 barrels of salted herring, averaging about 32 barrels per fisherman. The year 1850 marked the last highly productive year, with an annual production of 5,408 barrels and an average of 52.5 barrels per fisherman among the 103 active fishermen. Afterward, production quantities continued to decline. In 1890, there were only 339 barrels in total, produced by 64 fishermen, with an average of 5 barrels per fisherman.

Due to the sharp fluctuations in income, most fishermen had to rely on taking out loans to tide them over bad years. During prosperous years, they enjoyed middle-class lifestyles, but they seldom managed to repay their debts, becoming increasingly burdened with financial obligations. According to tax returns from Gävle fishermen, 91.8 percent of them were categorized as "poor" in 1759 due to low catches. By 1765, the number of impoverished fishermen had decreased to 12.5 percent. Even during bountiful years, fishermen struggled to compete financially with the city's wealthiest residents, the merchants. The constant cycle of highs and lows prevented many from accumulating economic reserves to avoid taking on debt during less productive periods. At most, one-tenth of the fishermen improved their financial status by the end of their lives, while at least a quarter were left destitute. Losing a fishing boat in a storm or to ice often spelled financial ruin, as the funds needed to build a new one were typically unavailable, and families could no longer travel to their fishing grounds.

== Boats ==
The Gävle fishermen employed galleasses, open clinker-built boats, for their long-distance voyages. Originally, these boats were equipped solely with a mainsail, but in the mid-18th century, their rigging was altered. The galleasses were then outfitted with square sails on the mainmast, mizzenmast, and jib. The size of these vessels varied significantly; wealthier fishermen could load up to 120 tons for trading voyages. On average, these boats were designed for approximately 30 to 50 tons, while the galleasses of poorer fishermen sometimes could only carry 15 tons. The last galleass employed for long-distance voyages was the Anna, built in the early 19th century. It belonged to Erik August Grellson and had a registered size of 44 tons. After Grellson's final voyage to Trysunda in 1895, he sold the boat to a sawmill. Following its conversion into a prahm, it ran aground and sank in 1916 while transporting timber off Söderhamn.

Within the fishing villages, the fishermen utilized smaller boats for their daily fishing activities. The largest of these rowboats were approximately 26 feet in length and were employed in purse seine fishing. For fishing with regular nets, they used boats about 24 feet long. These rowboats, much like the galleasses, were built using the clinker method, comprising up to 14 transverse frames and four or five planks. The primary material used by the boat builders was spruce, occasionally reinforced with twisted wood.

== Life in Gävle ==
In Gävle, the fishermen resided in the eastern quarters of the city, situated along the estuaries of the Gavleån, known as Östra Lillån and Islands Lillån. These areas featured warehouses and sheds where the boats were moored. Above them were barns, storage facilities, and outbuildings. and at the very top were the two-story dwellings with gables facing the street. The plots had an elongated shape, with the dwelling house occupying nearly the entire width, and a path leading to the open space in front of the farm buildings. In contrast to the simple dwellings found in the fishing villages, the houses in Gävle were comfortable and spacious, and some were even luxuriously furnished.

The Gävle fishermen were organized into the Fishermen's Association starting in 1738. Until the mid-19th century, they constituted the largest group within Gävle's citizenry. Together with the craftsmen's guild, they held influence over the selection of town officials. The community had a shared treasury to support impoverished members and widows of fishermen. In 1865, the fishermen's guild had to be dissolved due to changing laws, and it was succeeded by the "Fischerverein" (Fishermen's Association).

Within their close-knit social circles, the fishermen maintained strong bonds, and many of them were related to each other. Foreign fishermen could more easily gain citizenship if they married fishermen's daughters or widows. Through their connections in the fishing villages, everyone was well-acquainted with each other. Sometimes, sons or daughters of one fisherman worked as farmhands or maidservants for other fishermen. On occasion, the Gävle fishermen brought young men from the area around their village to Gävle in the fall. These individuals would study at Uppsala University during the winter and then return to their families with the fishermen in the spring.
