= Lund, Texas =

Lund
- Unincorporated community
- Location within the state of Texas Lund (the United States)
- Coordinates: 30°24′24″N 97°23′47″W
- Country: United States
- State: Texas
- County: Travis
- Time zone: UTC-6 (Central (CST))
  - Summer (DST): UTC-5 (CDT)

Lund is a small unincorporated community in northeastern Travis County, Texas, United States. It is located within the Greater Austin metropolitan area.

== History ==
Late in the 1880s, Swedes began to settle in Lund. It was initially called Pleasant Hill. A post office with the name of either a local family or the town in Sweden was established there in 1899. The community served as the hub of a sizable Swedish agricultural hamlet that grew as an outpost of the New Sweden region four miles to the west. N. M. Anderson, August Thornquist, and Gustaf Seaholm were Lund's first settlers. Other Swedish families settled in the area in the 1890s. The pastor of the New Sweden Lutheran Church was Dr. J. A. Stamline. On January 16, 1897, the Bethlehem congregation in Lund was founded with 19 communicants and 20 children. P. V. Nelson, Nels Ankarstolpe, and J. E. Rivers donated 112 acres (45 ha) of land to the congregation, and another acre was set aside for a communal cemetery. Construction of the church began in the autumn of 1899. In 1989, the Bethlehem Lutheran Church was still in operation. Lund had a general store, two cotton gins, and a blacksmith shop in the 1890s. From their residence in Lund, two brothers named Carl and Fred Bergman wrote letters to their sisters who lived in Sweden. They wrote, "West of us there live nothing but Swedes for a distance of about sixteen miles," in a letter dated January 23, 1896. "A peculiar variety of people dwell east, south, and north of us, including Americans, Germans, Bohemians, Negroes, and Mexicans." Large crops were generated by the fertile countryside, and the new immigrants in Lund started to identify more with Americans than with Swedes. Twenty-seven Lund natives fought in World War I, while several others did the same in World War II. Lund was seriously damaged by a storm on April 7, 1980. The Lund Bethlehem Lutheran Church had to be destroyed after being upended from its foundation. To replace the original church, a sizable brick building with a bell tower was constructed.

== Geography ==
Lund is located in northeastern Travis County.

== Education ==
The year 1891 saw the establishment of a Swedish Lutheran Sunday school by Dr. J. A. Stamline. The first school in Lund was established in the fall of 1894, and the initial academic year was three months long. The schoolhouse had windows on two sides and was 25 ft (7.6 m) by 25 ft (7.6 m) in size.

Lund School 1930

The school at Lund was closed in 1947 due to a decline in the population of the rural area, and the Manda school district subsequently incorporated it along with the schools in Carlson, New Sweden, and Kimbro. They all came together to form the Elgin Independent School District in 1963.

Schools that are zoned for the community are Neidig Elementary School, Elgin Middle School, and Elgin High School.
