= Daniel Bernhardsson =

Swedish footballer

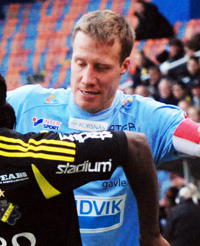

Personal information
- Date of birth: 31 January 1978 (age 48)
- Place of birth: Årsunda, Sweden
- Height: 1.82 m (5 ft 11 1/2 in)
- Position: Defender

Youth career
- Årsunda IF

Senior career*
Years	Team	Apps	(Gls)
2000–2013	Gefle IF	392	(42)
- * Club domestic league appearances and goals

Daniel Bernhardsson (born 31 January 1978) is a Swedish former footballer who played as a defender. He has played over 300 matches for Gefle IF and he served as team captain.
