= Sälgsjön =

- Location within Sweden Gävleborg Location within Sweden
- Coordinates: 60°37′N 17°07′E
- Country: Sweden
- Province: Gästrikland
- County: Gävleborg County
- Municipality: Gävle Municipality

Area
  - Total: 0.28 km^{2} (0.11 sq mi)

Population (31 December 2010)
  - Total: 207
  - Density: 737/km^{2} (1,910/sq mi)
- Time zone: UTC+1 (CET)
  - Summer (DST): UTC+2 (CEST)

Sälgsjön is a locality situated in Gävle Municipality, Gävleborg County, Sweden with 207 inhabitants in 2010.
