= Storsjön (Gästrikland) =

Lake in Sweden

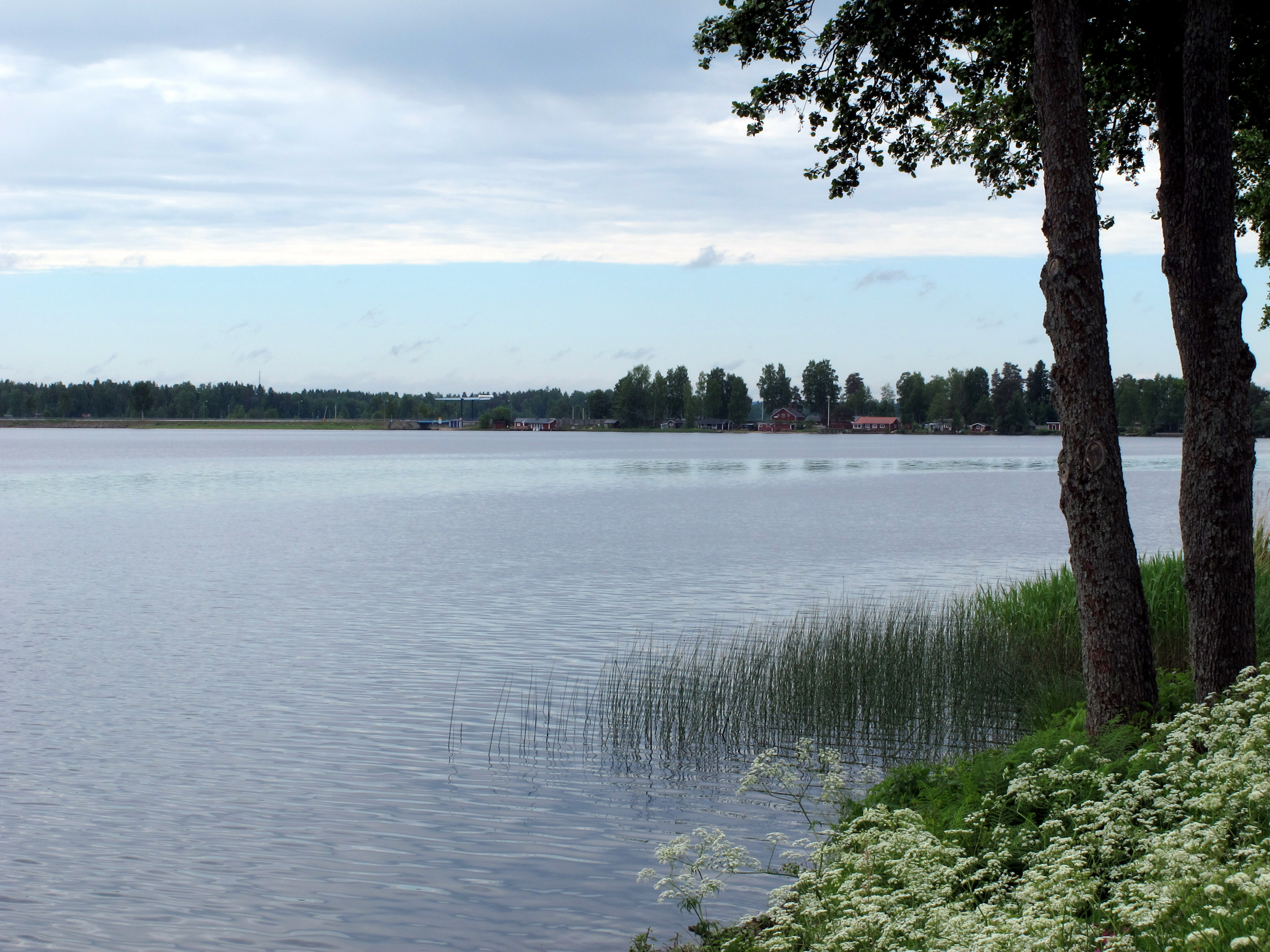
- Storsjön from the boulder ridge between Årsunda and Sandviken

- Location within Sweden Gävleborg Location within Sweden
- Location: Gävleborg
- Coordinates: 60°33′54.98″N 16°44′59.07″E
- Basin countries: Sweden
- Surface area: 70.6 km^{2} (27.3 sq mi)
- Max. depth: 15 m (49 ft)
- Shore length^{1}: 140 km (87 mi)
- Surface elevation: 62 m (203 ft)
- Settlements: Sandviken & Gävle
- ^{1} Shore length is not a well-defined measure.

Storsjön (Swedish pronunciation: [ˈstǔːɧœn], lit. 'The Great Lake') is a lake in Gävle Municipality and Sandviken Municipality in Gästrikland and is a part of Gavleån. Storsjön has an area of a 70.6 km^{2} (27.3 sq mi), a greatest depth of 15 metres (49 ft), and is approximately 62 metres (203 ft) above sea level. The lake is drained by Gavleån. Experimental fishing has proved that there are many different varieties of fish here, such as perch, bream, sea bream and ruffe.

An old saying says that the lake has "just as many islands as there are days in a year" which should not be interpreted literally, but simply means that they are too many to count (a more accurate figure would be around 150 islands). Storsjön is mostly around 2–5 metres (6.6–16.4 ft) in depth.

Old sources claim that Storsjön previously went by the name of Odensjön. This could possibly be proven by a 17th-century map where Gavleån, that flows through Gävle, is called Odensjöströmmen (lit. "Stream of Odensjön"). Storsjön is connected to Gavleån, which is connected to the sea.

== Fish ==
By experimental fishing, these fishes have been caught:

- Perch
- Bream
- Sea bream
- Ruffe
- Pike
- Sander
- Cyprinidae
- Bleak
- Roach
- European smelt
- Crucian carp
- Rudd
- Vendace
- Tench
- Vimba vimba

== Compounds related to the lake ==
- Sandvikens segelsällskap SSS (lit. "Sandviken Yacht Club")
- Föreningen Rädda Storsjön (lit. "Compound Save the Great Lake")

== Beaches ==
Water samples are taken at the following beaches in Storsjön:

- Hedåsbadet, Sandviken
- Strandbaden, Årsunda
- Sörtuttsbadet, Sandviken

== Catchment areas ==
Storsjön is a part of catchment area (671779-155196) which the Swedish Meteorological and Hydrological Institute calls Utloppet av Storsjön (lit. "The outlet of the Great Lake"). The median height is 67 metres (220 ft) above sea level, and the area is 149 km^{2} (58 sq mi). If all the 367 catchment areas are counted upstream the accumulated area would be a 2,168.02 km^{2} (837.08 sq mi). The catchment area Gavleån flows into the sea. The catchment area mostly contains forest (36%). The catchment area has a 70.48 km^{2} (27.21 sq mi) of water surface, giving it a lake percentage of 47.3%. Settlements in the area contain the size of 10.37 km^{2} (4.00 sq mi), or 7% of the catchment area.
