= Norrlandet =

- Location within Sweden Gävleborg Location within Sweden
- Coordinates: 60°43′N 17°16′E
- Country: Sweden
- Province: Gästrikland
- County: Gävleborg County
- Municipality: Gävle Municipality

Area
  - Total: 1.14 km^{2} (0.44 sq mi)

Population (31 December 2010)
  - Total: 329
  - Density: 288/km^{2} (750/sq mi)
- Time zone: UTC+1 (CET)
  - Summer (DST): UTC+2 (CEST)

Norrlandet is a locality situated in Gävle Municipality, Gävleborg County, Sweden with 329 inhabitants in 2010.
