= Hagsta =

- Location within Sweden Gävleborg Location within Sweden
- Coordinates: 60°55′N 17°01′E
- Country: Sweden
- Province: Gästrikland
- County: Gävleborg County
- Municipality: Gävle Municipality

Area
  - Total: 0.74 km^{2} (0.29 sq mi)

Population (2005-12-31)
  - Total: 200
  - Density: 272/km^{2} (700/sq mi)
- Time zone: UTC+1 (CET)
  - Summer (DST): UTC+2 (CEST)

Hagsta is a village situated in Gävle Municipality, Gävleborg County, Sweden with 200 inhabitants in 2005.
