= Norrsundet =

- Location within Sweden Gävleborg Location within Sweden
- Coordinates: 60°57′N 17°08′E
- Country: Sweden
- Province: Gästrikland
- County: Gävleborg County
- Municipality: Gävle Municipality

Area
  - Total: 2.24 km^{2} (0.86 sq mi)

Population (31 December 2010)
  - Total: 968
  - Density: 433/km^{2} (1,120/sq mi)
- Time zone: UTC+1 (CET)
  - Summer (DST): UTC+2 (CEST)

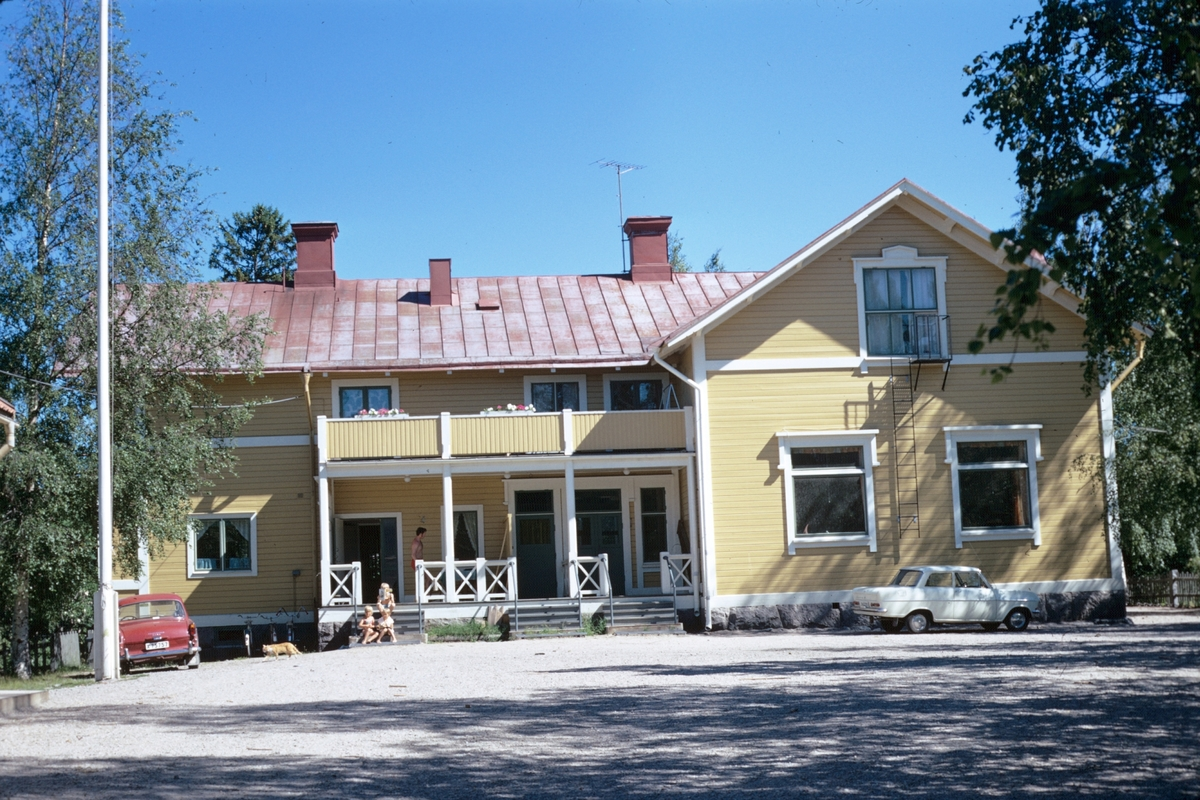
Ådala school in Norrsundet, Sweden, built in 1897, known today as "Norrsundets Arbetarmuseum".

Norrsundet is a locality situated in Gävle Municipality, Gävleborg County, Sweden with 968 inhabitants in 2010.
