= Totra =

- Location within Sweden Gävleborg Location within Sweden
- Coordinates: 60°55′N 17°04′E
- Country: Sweden
- Province: Gästrikland
- County: Gävleborg County
- Municipality: Gävle Municipality

Area
  - Total: 0.76 km^{2} (0.29 sq mi)

Population (31 December 2010)
  - Total: 273
  - Density: 360/km^{2} (930/sq mi)
- Time zone: UTC+1 (CET)
  - Summer (DST): UTC+2 (CEST)

Totra is a locality situated in Gävle Municipality, Gävleborg County, Sweden, with 273 inhabitants in 2010.
