= Lunds =

Lunds may refer to:

== Places ==
- Lunds, North Yorkshire, England, a hamlet
- Lunds, Wisconsin, United States, an unincorporated community

== Other uses ==
- Lunds ASK, a Premier League chess club in Lund, Sweden
- Lunds BK, a football club in Lund, Sweden
- Lunds Boxningssällskap, a boxing club in Lund, Sweden
- Lunds Nation, one of 13 student nations of Lund University

== See also ==
- Lunds & Byerlys, an American supermarket operator
- Lunds Studentsångförening, a Swedish amateur choir
- Lund's Anarchist Group, a former Swedish organisation
- Lund's amphibious rat, a mammal of southeastern South America.
- Lund's Atlantic tree-rat, a mammal found in Brazil
- Lund's fly, an insect originally from tropical Africa
- Lund's node, in the gall bladder
- Lund's teiid, a lizard found in Brazil
- Lund's Blue Anchor Line, a former shipping company which operated between the United Kingdom, South Africa and Australia
- Lund's Bristol ware, porcelain
- Lund's Tower, a folly in North Yorkshire, England
- Lund (disambiguation)
