= Samuel Asklöf =

Swedish ice hockey player

- Born: 12 February 1998 (age 27) Gävle, Sweden
- Height: 5 ft 9 in (175 cm)
- Weight: 154 lb (70 kg; 11 st 0 lb)
- Position: Centre
- Shot: Left
- Played for: Brynäs IF
- Playing career: 2016–2020

Samuel Asklöf (born 12 February 1998) is a former Swedish professional ice hockey centre who played in the Swedish Hockey League (SHL).
