= Lund (disambiguation) =

Lund is a city in the province of Scania (Skåne), southern Sweden.

Lund may also refer to:

== Places ==
=== Canada ===
- Lund, British Columbia, an unincorporated village

=== Denmark ===
- Lund, Horsens, in Horsens Municipality

=== England ===
- Lund, East Riding of Yorkshire, a village near Beverley
- Lund, North Yorkshire, a hamlet near Selby, in the East Riding of Yorkshire until 1974

=== Sweden ===
- Lund, Gävle, a locality
- Lund Municipality, a municipality in Skåne
- Diocese of Lund, a Church of Sweden (Evangelical Lutheran) diocese

=== Norway ===
- Lund Municipality (Norway), a municipality in Rogaland county
- Lund, Kristiansand, a borough in the city of Kristiansand in Agder county
- Lund, Namsos, a village in the municipality of Namsos in Trøndelag county

=== United States ===
- Lund Township, Douglas County, Minnesota
- Lund, Nevada, a small town and census-designated place
- Lund, Texas, an unincorporated community
- Lund, Utah, an unincorporated village
- Lund, Wisconsin, an unincorporated community

== People and fictional characters ==
- Lund (surname), including a list of people and fictional characters
- Lund (tribe), a Baloch tribe in Pakistan

== Transportation ==
- Lund Airport, a former private airport near Lund, Sweden
- Lund Central Station, a railway station in Lund, Sweden
- Lund tramway, Lund, Sweden
- Lund Highway, a road in southern Utah, United States

== Other uses ==
- Battle of Lund, part of the Scanian War, fought in 1676 near Lund, Sweden
- Lund Chamber Choir, a choir in Lund, Sweden
- Lund Observatory, Lund, Sweden
- Lund University, Lund, Sweden

== See also ==
- Lund Cathedral, a Lutheran church in Lund, Sweden
- Lund Principle, in ecumenical relations between Christian churches
- Lunds (disambiguation)
- LundXY, a Danish angel investment and startup catalyst firm
- White Lund Industrial Estate, the main employment area in Morecambe
