= Trödje =

- Location within Sweden Gävleborg Location within Sweden
- Coordinates: 60°49′N 17°12′E
- Country: Sweden
- Province: Gästrikland
- County: Gävleborg County
- Municipality: Gävle Municipality

Area
  - Total: 0.70 km^{2} (0.27 sq mi)

Population (31 December 2010)
  - Total: 333
  - Density: 476/km^{2} (1,230/sq mi)
- Time zone: UTC+1 (CET)
  - Summer (DST): UTC+2 (CEST)

Trödje (Swedish pronunciation: [ˈtrœ̂jːɛ, ˈtrœ̂dːjɛ]) is a locality situated in Gävle Municipality, Gävleborg County, Sweden with 333 inhabitants in 2010.
