= Berg, Gävle =

Berg
- Location within Sweden Gävleborg Location within Sweden
- Coordinates: 60°56′N 17°01′E
- Country: Sweden
- Province: Gästrikland
- County: Gävleborg County
- Municipality: Gävle Municipality

Area
  - Total: 0.50 km^{2} (0.19 sq mi)

Population (31 December 2010)
  - Total: 213
  - Density: 422/km^{2} (1,090/sq mi)
- Time zone: UTC+1 (CET)
  - Summer (DST): UTC+2 (CEST)

Berg is a locality situated in Gävle Municipality, Gävleborg County, Sweden with 213 inhabitants in 2010.
