= Björke =

- Location within Sweden Gävleborg Location within Sweden
- Coordinates: 60°46′N 17°12′E
- Country: Sweden
- Province: Gästrikland
- County: Gävleborg County
- Municipality: Gävle Municipality

Area
  - Total: 0.60 km^{2} (0.23 sq mi)

Population (31 December 2010)
  - Total: 349
  - Density: 582/km^{2} (1,510/sq mi)
- Time zone: UTC+1 (CET)
  - Summer (DST): UTC+2 (CEST)

Björke is a locality situated in Gävle Municipality, Gävleborg County, Sweden with 349 inhabitants in 2010.

== See also ==
- Björke boat
