= Morten Lund =

Morten Lund may refer to:

- Morten Lund (musician) (born 1972), Danish jazz drummer
- Morten Lund (investor) (born 1972), Danish businessman
- Morten Lund (politician) (born 1945), Norwegian politician

== See also ==
- Lund (disambiguation)
