= Hamrångefjärden =

- Location within Sweden Gävleborg Location within Sweden
- Coordinates: 60°54′N 17°04′E
- Country: Sweden
- Province: Gästrikland
- County: Gävleborg County
- Municipality: Gävle Municipality

Area
  - Total: 1.57 km^{2} (0.61 sq mi)

Population (31 December 2010)
  - Total: 509
  - Density: 324/km^{2} (840/sq mi)
- Time zone: UTC+1 (CET)
  - Summer (DST): UTC+2 (CEST)

Hamrångefjärden is a locality situated in Gävle Municipality, Gävleborg County, Sweden with 509 inhabitants in 2010.
