= Björke boat =

Björke boat / Hille boat
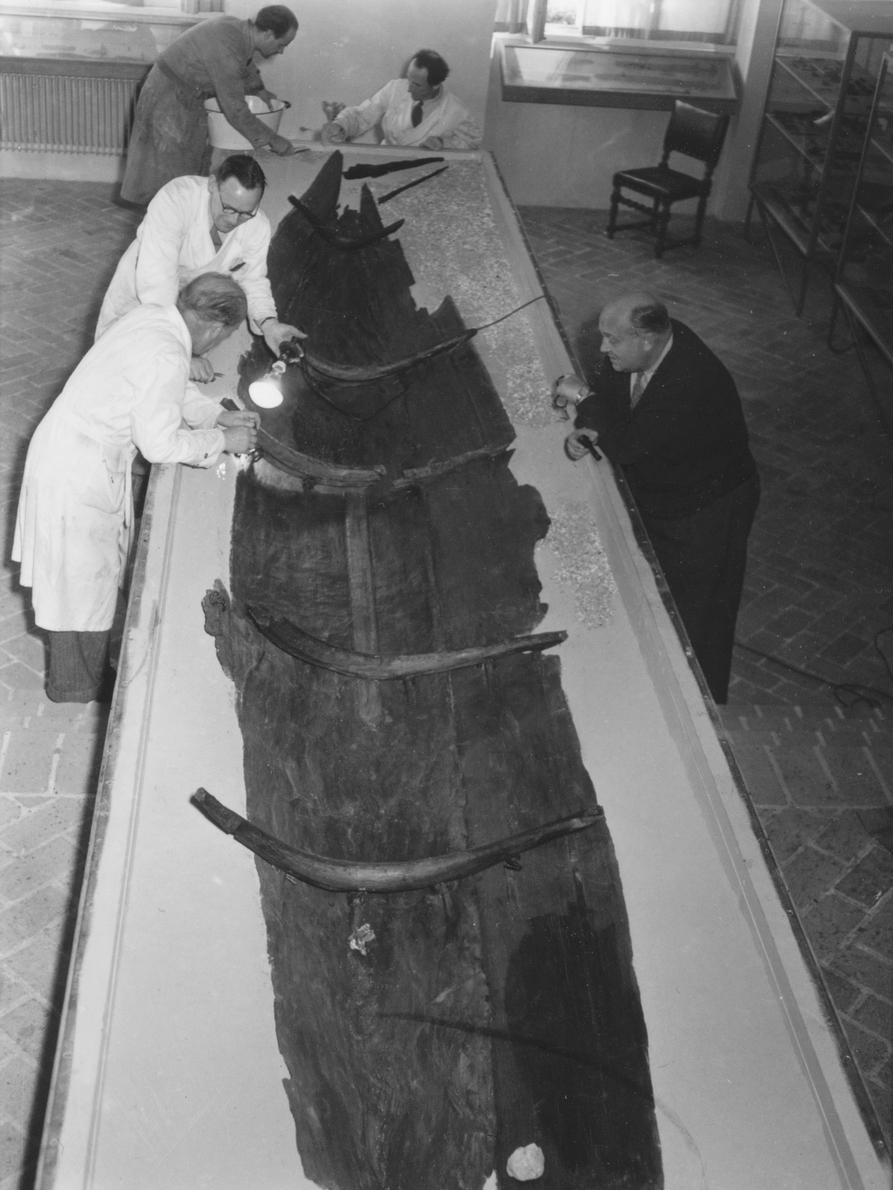
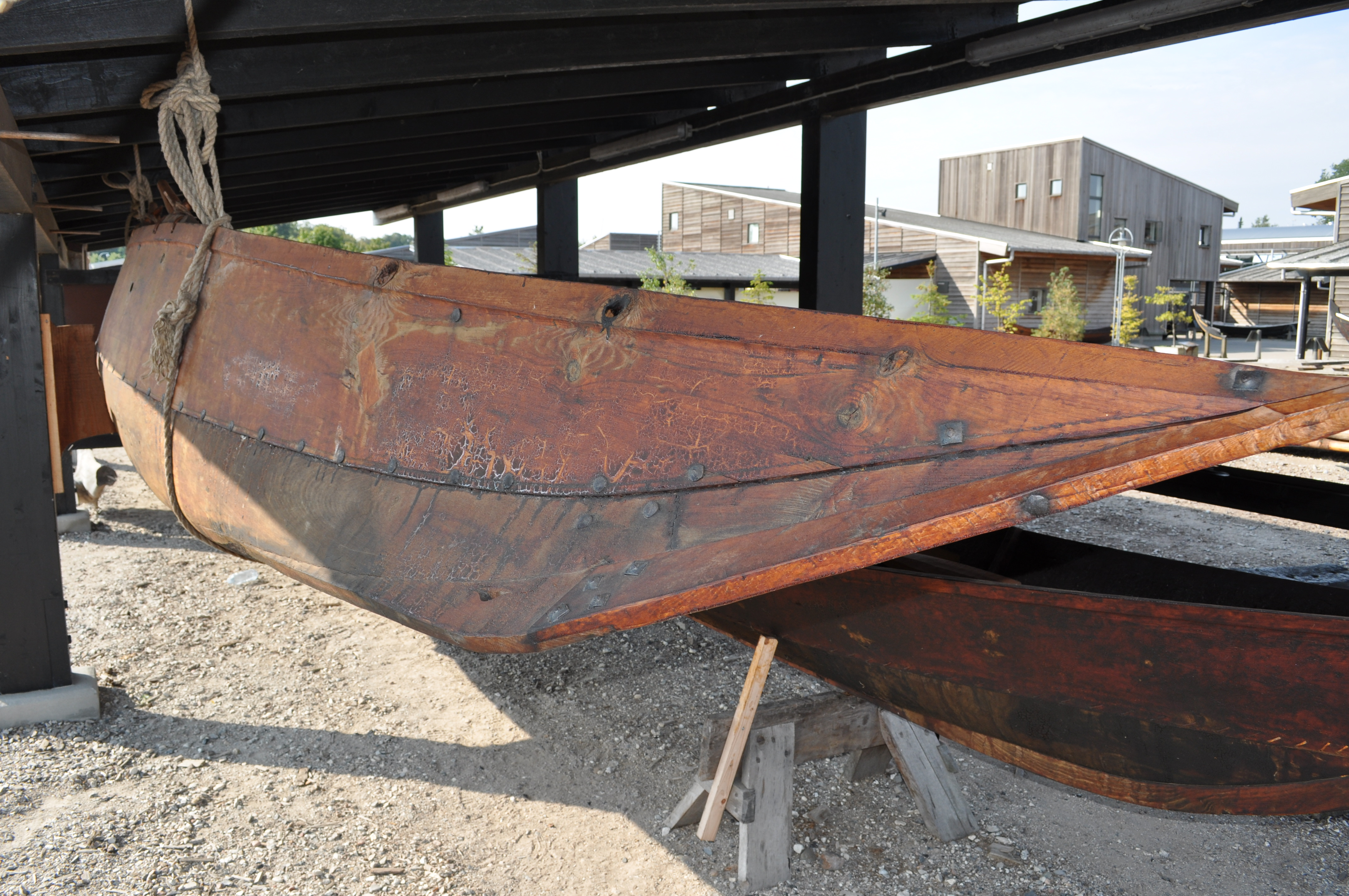
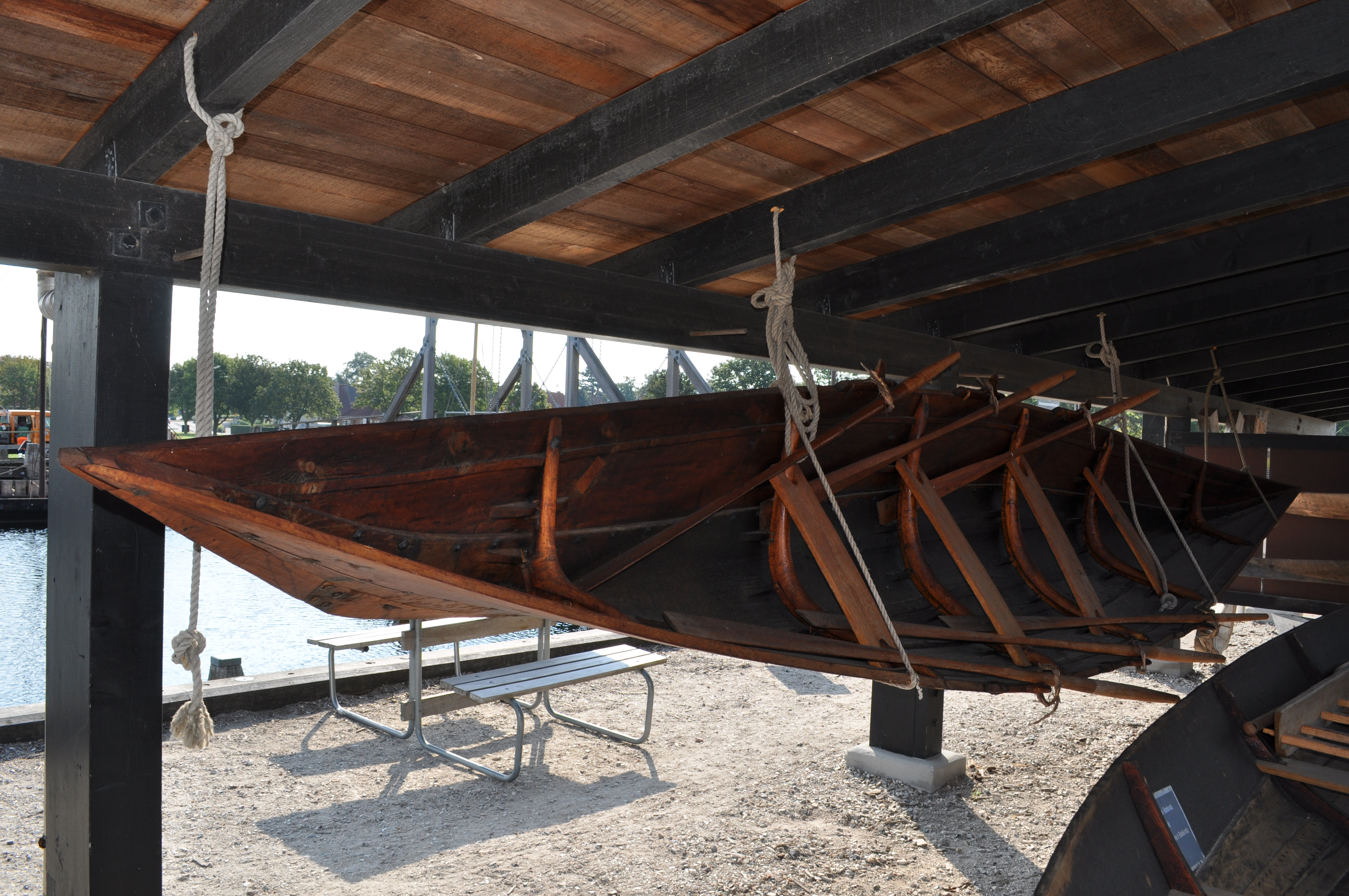
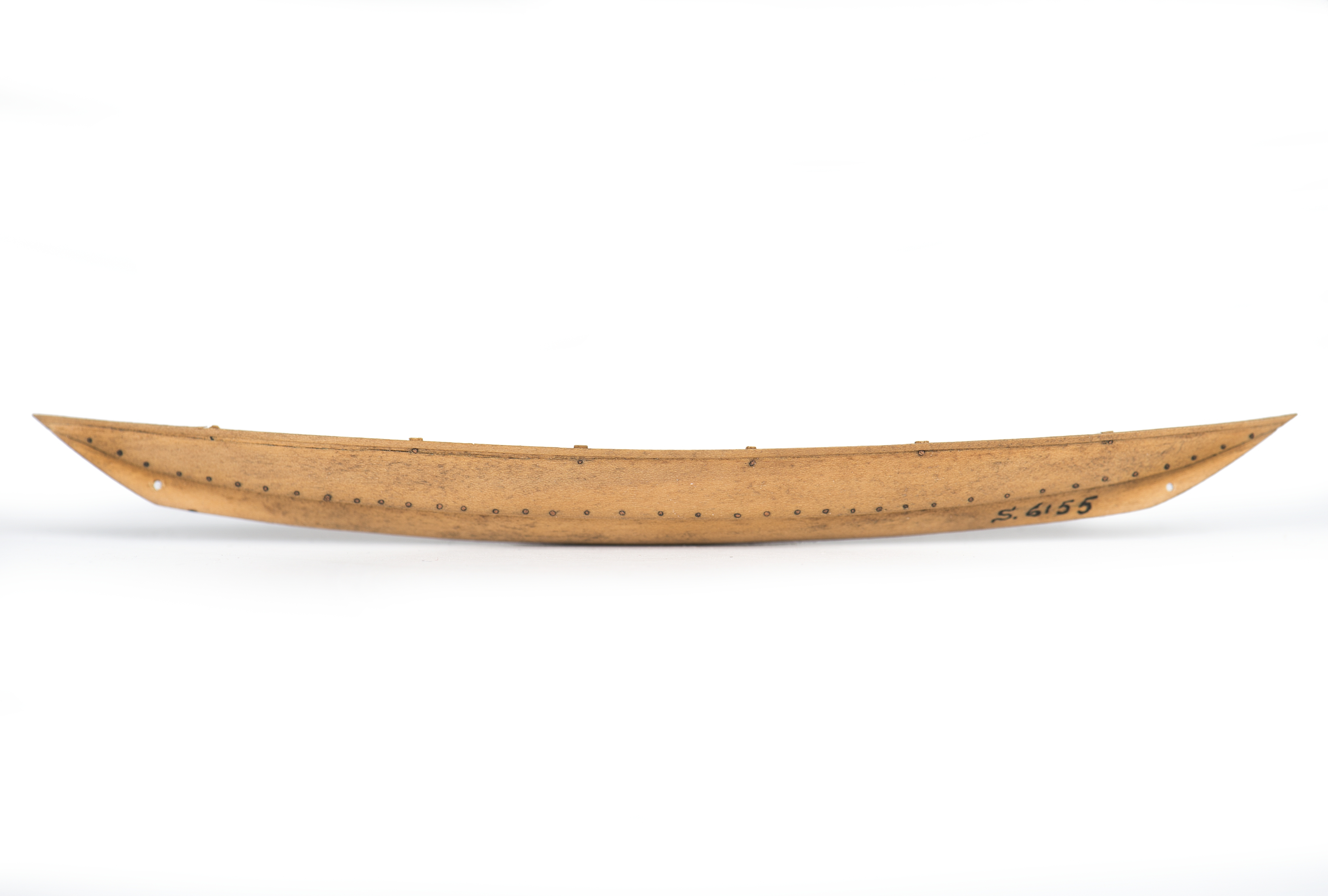
- Top left: Björke boat when found
- Top right: Replica of the Björke boat, built at the Viking Ship Museum in Roskilde
- Lower left: Replica of the Björke boat, built at the Viking Ship Museum in Roskilde
- Lower right: Model of the Björke boat

The Björke boat, or Hille boat (Swedish: Björkebåten, Hillebåten), is a prehistoric boat from Björke, in the Hille district of Gävle Municipality, Sweden, dated to around 320 AD (± 70 years), and buried around 400 AD. It was found during a cleanup of a canal in the fall of 1947, and is, together with the Nydam boat from Denmark (ca 320 AD), some of the earliest examples of clinker boat building in the world.

It can be viewed at the Gävleborg County museum in their permanent exhibition.

== Description ==
The Björke boat is 7.22 meters long and 1.24 meters wide. Its bottom consists of a hollowed-out log of linden. The boat is to be considered a log boat, but its sides are raised with a board on each side of pine. This upper planking is arranged as clinker planking and is attached to struts that lie inside the lower part of the boat. The board was attached with iron nails that were riveted on the inside. It has six frames (ribs) on each side, consisting of bent branches from spruce, sewn to the hull.

At the time of the find, there was a 67 kg round stone placed on a birch bark mat inside the boat, the purpose of which may have been to provide ballast. The boat was probably propelled with paddles, since there were no holes for oars.

== Dating ==
Dating the ship has been hard. The boat was preserved with glycerol to hold it together, making it impossible to determine its age using the C14 radiocarbon dating.

The former curator of the Gävleborg County museum, Philibert Humbla (1896–1952), concluded that the boat probably dates from the 1st century AD, which garnered support when a so-called "pollen analysis" was carried out. However, some Norwegian scientists doubted this, and concluded that the vessel was hardly older than the 7th century AD.

Much later, it was found that a person from Björke, Erland Olsson, had a small piece of wood from the boat, left untouched from the glycerol treatment. Dating the piece in 1984, using the C14 methord, dates the boat to the 5th century AD, more specifically 320 AD, plus/minus 70 years, and buried around 400 AD.

== See also ==
- Nydam boat
