= Bönan =

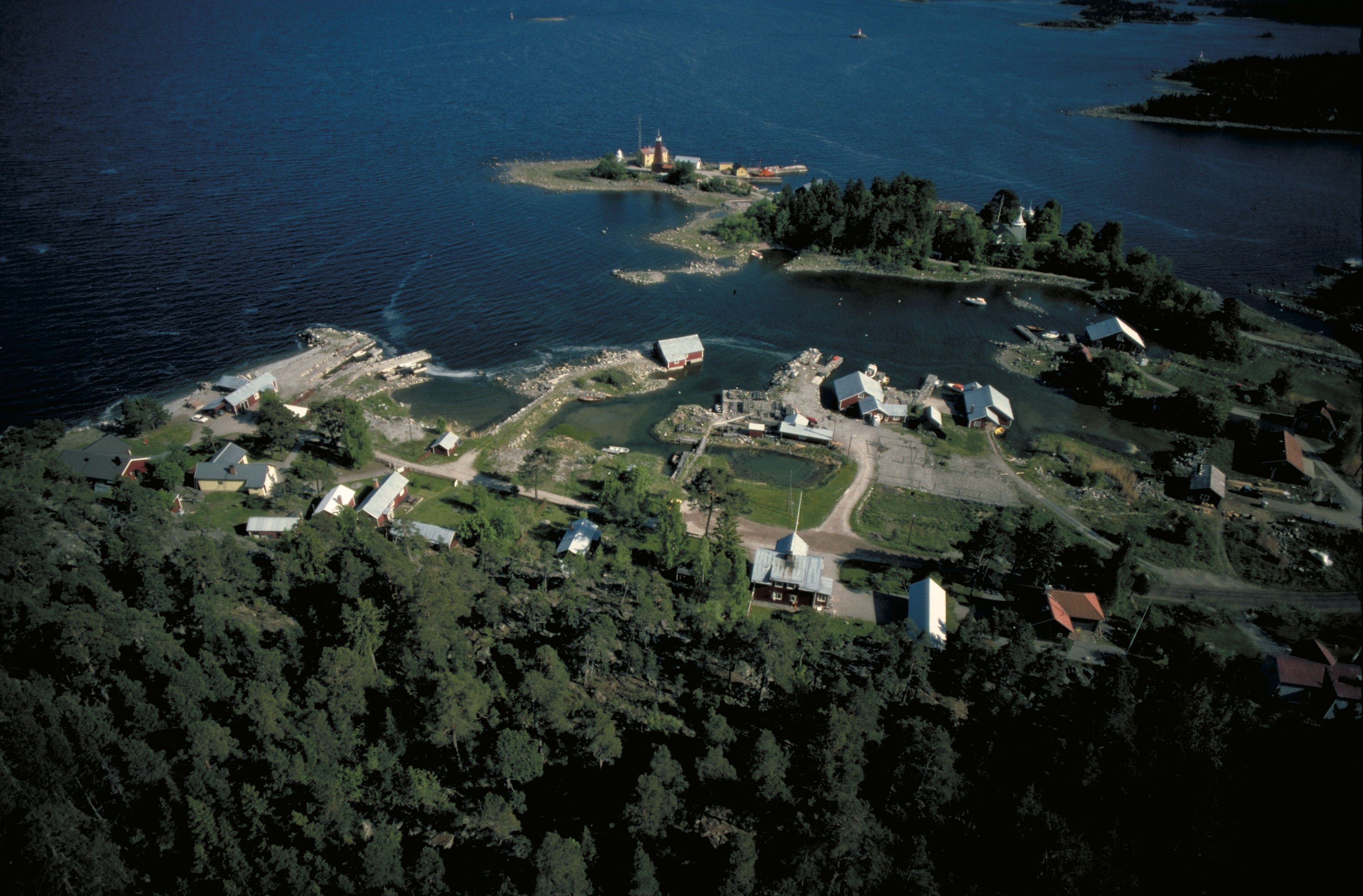
- Bönan - KMB

- Location within Sweden Gävleborg Location within Sweden
- Coordinates: 60°44′N 17°18′E
- Country: Sweden
- Province: Gästrikland
- County: Gävleborg County
- Municipality: Gävle Municipality

Area
  - Total: 0.79 km^{2} (0.31 sq mi)

Population (31 December 2010)
  - Total: 316
  - Density: 400/km^{2} (1,000/sq mi)
- Time zone: UTC+1 (CET)
  - Summer (DST): UTC+2 (CEST)

Bönan is a locality situated in Gävle Municipality, Gävleborg County, Sweden with 316 inhabitants in 2010.
