= Ulvö gamla kapell =

Church building in Örnsköldsvik Municipality, Sweden

Coordinates: 63°01′21″N 18°38′59″E

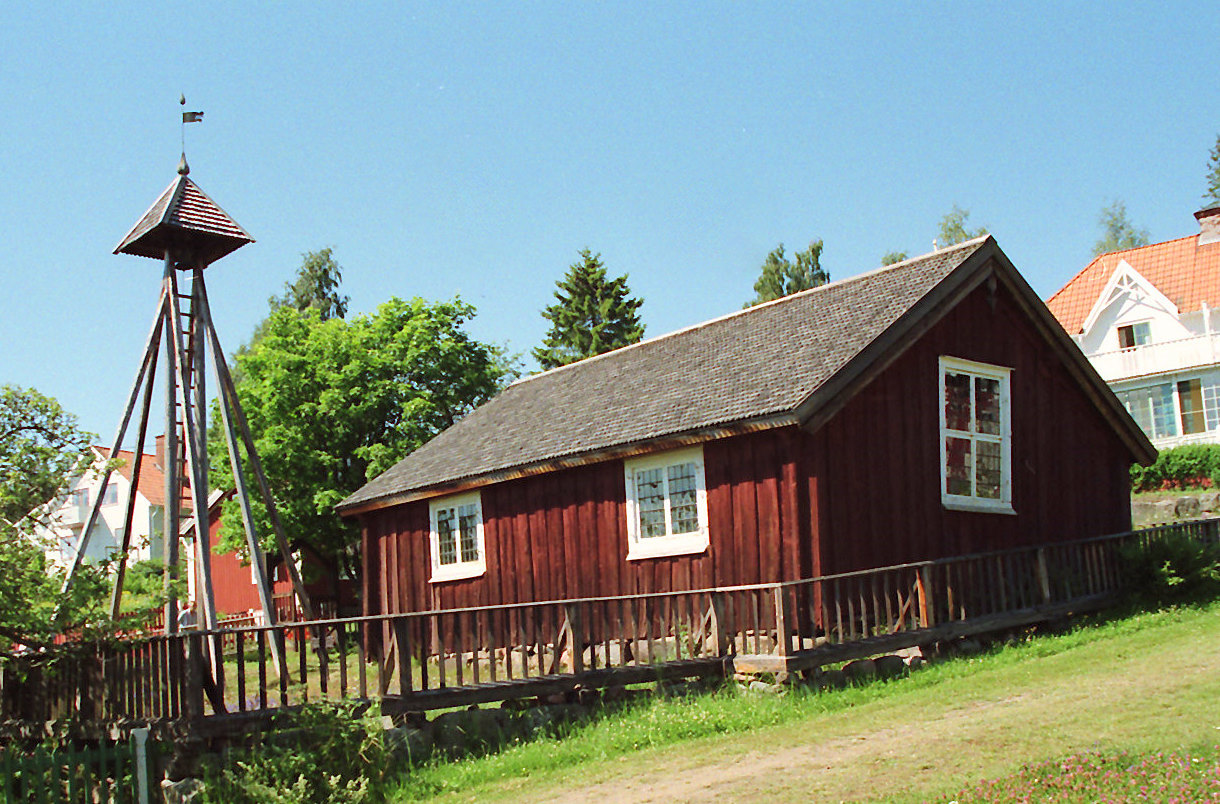
Ulvö gamla kapell

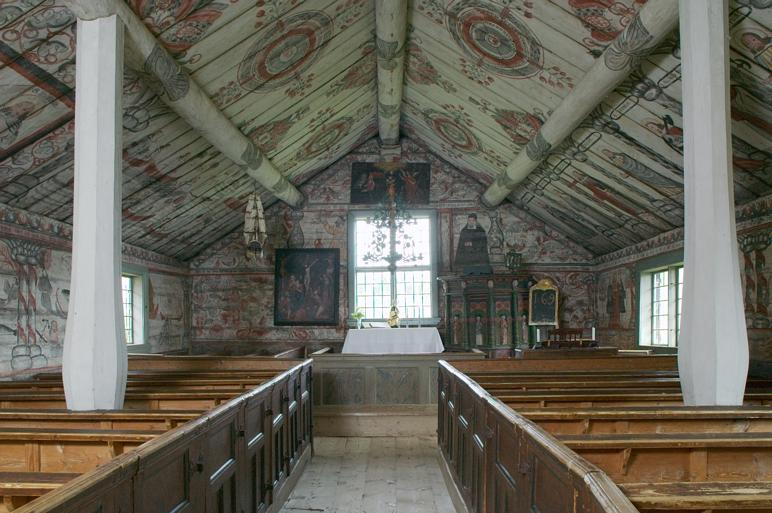
View into the chapel

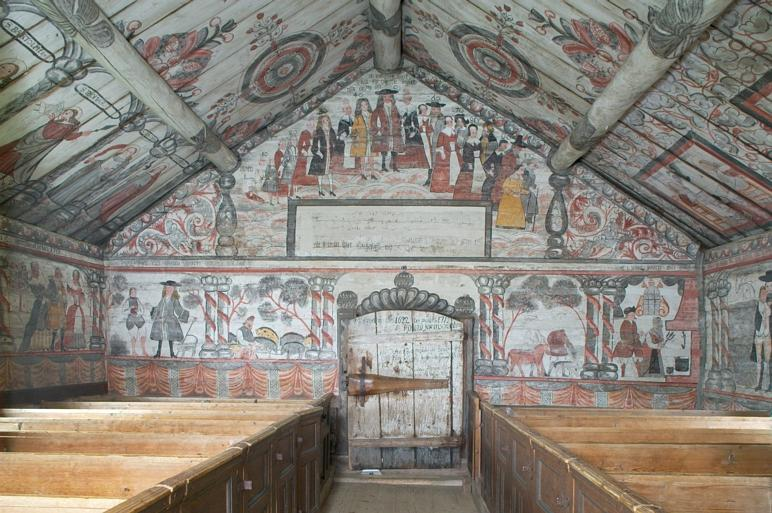
Western cross wall with door

Ulvö gamla kapell (Swedish for Old Chapel of Ulvön) is a wooden chapel in Ulvöhamn, the main settlement on the island of Ulvön in the Swedish municipality of Örnsköldsvik. It was built in 1622 by Gävle fishermen; Lutheran services were held there regularly until 1894. Due to population decline, the chapel’s significance diminished over the course of the 20th century, leading to its deconsecration in 2010 by the pastor of the Nätra parish, who had been responsible for it until then. Ulvö gamla kapell is one of three painted chapels of the Gävle fishermen and is considered to be the most beautiful. It was designated a listed building by the Västernorrland County Council in 1996.

== History ==
Gävle fishermen fished in Ulvöhamn from the beginning of the 17th century at the latest and built chapels in their fishing villages. Ulvö gamla kapell, built in 1622, is the oldest surviving of these chapels. Originally, the building stood at the western entrance to Ulvösundet; it was moved to its current position in the center of Ulvöhamn around 1740 at the latest. Next to the chapel is a small cemetery, which was consecrated in 1745 by the parish priest of Nätra parish. There, the island’s inhabitants buried passing sailors who died on Ulvön. Until 1920, the islanders buried their own dead in Nätra; since then, they have been buried on a small island in Bysjön on Norra Ulvön.

Ulvön initially only served as a fishing base for the fishermen during the summer months. The priest from Nätra only came to Ulvön on a few Sundays a year; usually a Gävle fisherman or theology student (some of whom spent the summer on Ulvön) led the meetings. A service was held in the chapel every Sunday and public holiday; there were also short daily devotions. These were abolished in the course of the 19th century, one of the consequences of the decline of the fishing trips. It was strictly forbidden to work or engage in trade on Sundays; fishermen who broke this rule were fined heavily by the municipality. It was forbidden to enter the harbor during church services; arriving sailors had to leave their boat a short distance from the village and walk the rest of the way. In the autumn, the chapel was closed after a final communal prayer. When there were no sheds yet in Ulvöhamn, it served as a tool store for the fishermen in winter.

In 1874, a pilot on board a ship from Gothenburg contracted smallpox; a total of 14 people died of the disease on Ulvön. They were buried together next to the chapel, and a small, still-standing iron cross was erected in their memory. At the end of the 19th century, the last Gävle fishermen left Ulvön, and the chapel slowly fell into disrepair. The municipality planned to demolish it and erect a larger building, for which King Oscar II granted permission in December 1888. However, when the king visited the chapel in August 1890, he was impressed by the paintings inside. He donated 200 kronor to the people of Ulvöhamn for the preservation of the building, after which the demolition plans were dropped. The Västernorrlands Museum bought the entire complex for 500 kronor in February 1892 and has maintained it ever since. Construction of the new Ulvö kyrka began in the autumn of 1892; it was consecrated in August 1894. After only sporadic church services were held in the Ulvö gamla kapell in the 20th century, it was deconsecrated in April 2010 to make it possible for both church and civil weddings to be celebrated in it.

== Architecture ==
The rectangular wooden building is built as a log house, about ten meters long, seven meters wide, and clad with Falun red boards. There are two lead-framed windows on each long side and one on the eastern cross wall. When windows were retrofitted into the north wall in 1839, the paintings there were damaged. A wooden bell tower was erected in 1758. A small copper bell rang at church services and when the fishermen left for their fishing grounds. To ensure that everyone had an equal chance of catching fish, it was forbidden to set off before the bell rang. Originally, there was a whipping post in front of the chapel, though it was never used. A wooden fence surrounds the entire complex.

== Equipment ==
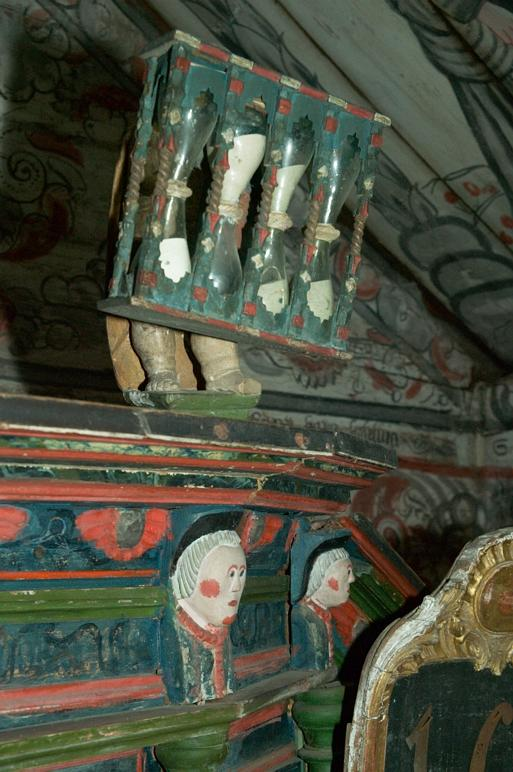
Pulpit hourglass

=== General ===
A massive lock hangs on the gate of the chapel. The exterior is adorned with a wooden statue believed to date from the 15th century. It depicts God seated, holding a globe in his left hand while raising his right hand in blessing. Together with seven other wooden statues that have been kept at the Västernorrlands Museum since the 1930s, it likely belonged to a winged altar. Inside the chapel, several rows of simple wooden benches flank a central aisle. To the right of the entrance is an offering box, the contents of which were distributed to the poorest people in the village. On the eastern cross wall opposite the entrance, there is a richly decorated 17th-century pulpit without a sounding board. The angular pulpit box is decorated with carved pillars and plants in blue, green and red; wooden figures stand between the pillars. The pillars, the figures placed in niches, and the arches above them are characteristic features of Renaissance pulpits. A four-glass pulpit hourglass stands on the upper edge of the basket. The fishermen of Ulvöhamn purchased the pulpit in 1753 from the parish of Vibyggerå; previously, there had been none in the chapel.

Two 18th-century oil paintings hang on the east wall: Jesus on the cross to the north of the window and the Annunciation above the window. Two wooden chandeliers, believed to date from the 18th century, are mounted above the central aisle. Near the pulpit hangs the three-masted votive ship Gustaf från Gefle, which is rigged as a full-rigged ship. It was donated in 1770 by three Gävle fishermen who originally came from the mainland near Ulvön. The ship was restored in 1945.

=== Paintings ===
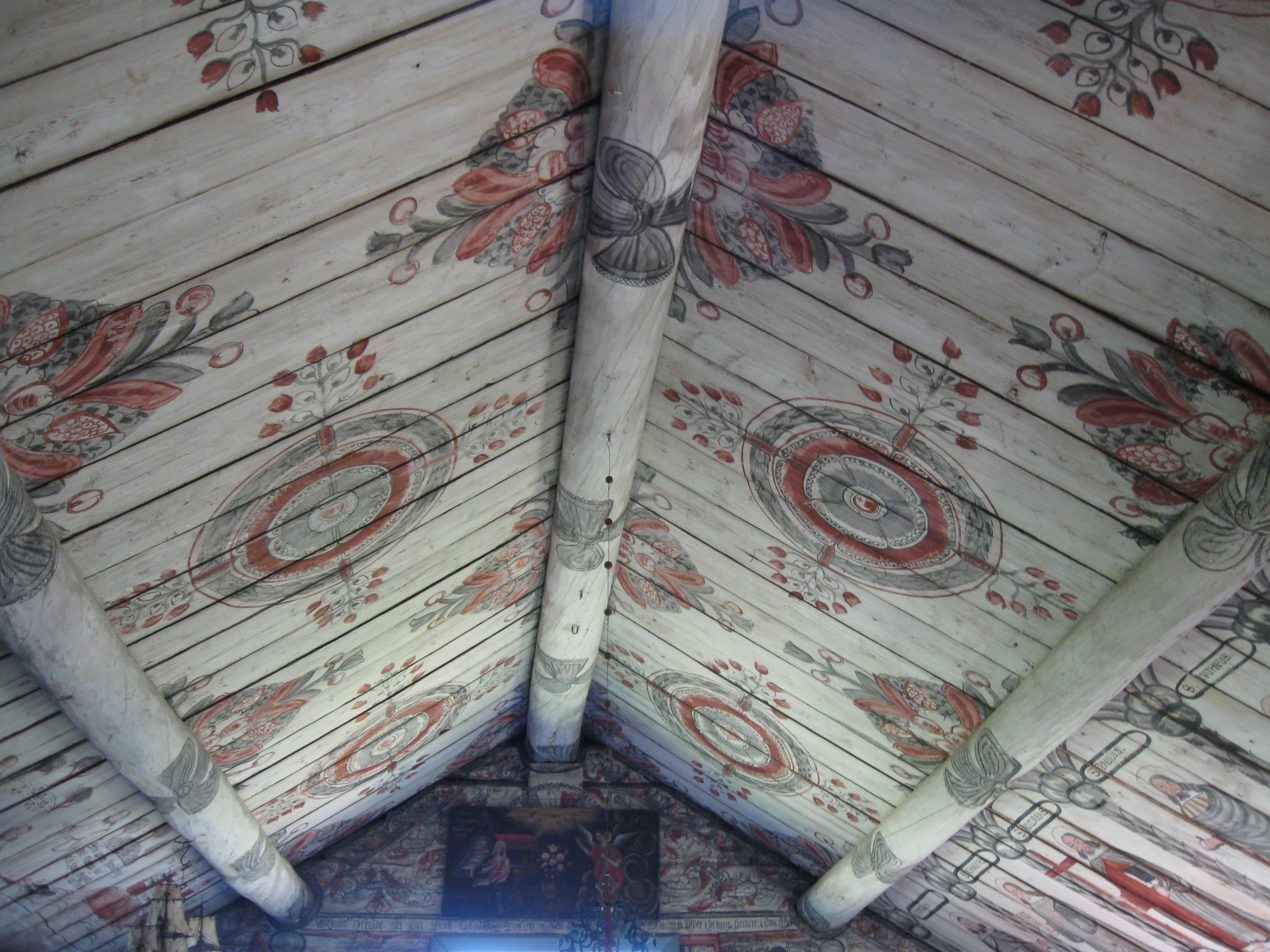
Roof of the chapel

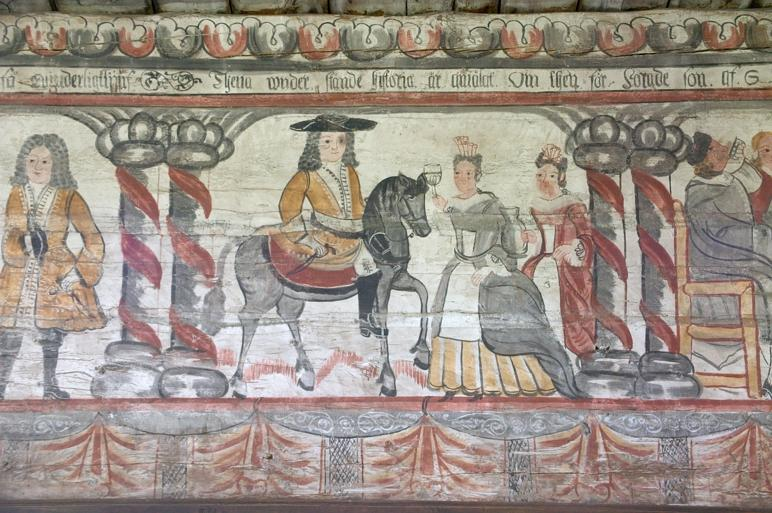
The Prodigal Son on horseback

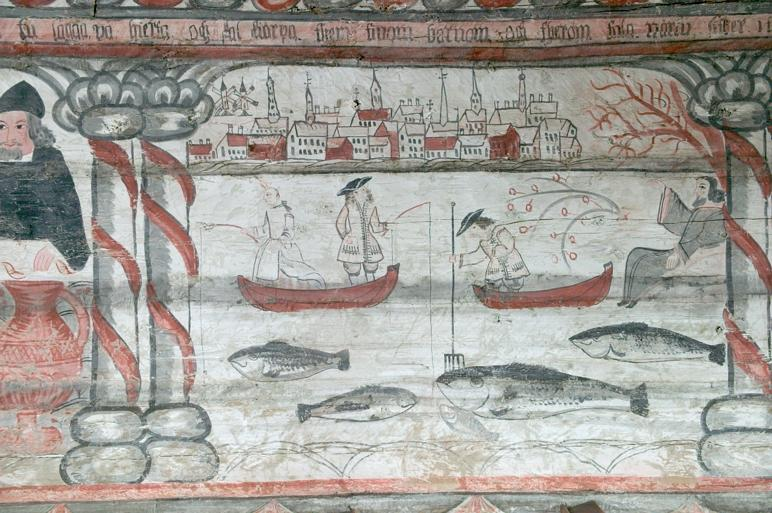
Fishing scene with Jesus on the beach

The walls and roof of the chapel are completely painted inside with distemper. The work was carried out in 1719 by Roland Johansson Öberg, a farmer from Sörbyn on Ulvön born around 1675. He had already decorated the chapel in the fishing village of Barsta in 1699. According to the inscriptions on the doorway, the theology student Nicolaus Alanger was preaching in the chapel at the time of the painting, and the theological content of the paintings probably originates from him.

The paintings on the roof are divided into three sections. The northern and southern halves of the roof are each subdivided by a wooden beam; while the lower sections each have their own theme, the two middle quarters of the roof form a single pictorial field. The south side, framed by pilasters, depicts the twelve apostles. Paul of Tarsus is depicted in place of Jude Thaddeus. The north side depicts the four evangelists: John with an eagle and an open book (in which the verse “For God so loved the world,” John 3:16, can be read), Luke with a bull, Mark with a lion, and Matthew with a book in his hand and the winged figure beside him. The center of the roof is decorated with plants and a scene featuring boats and fishermen at work, who are being blessed by Jesus.

A painted band of leaves runs along the walls beneath the roof. Below it are explanations of the paintings and biblical references. At the eastern end of the southern long wall, two disciples are depicted together with Jesus on the road to Emmaus. On the rest of the south wall, the entire western cross wall, and part of the north wall, the Parable of the Prodigal Son is told in nine (originally perhaps ten) scenes, with the depiction running clockwise from south to north. In the first scene, the son leaves his parents' house, dressed in 17th-century style. The second scene shows him approaching two women in elegant attire; one holds a bottle and the other a cup. The third image depicts the prodigal son at a drinking party with men and women who take away his inheritance, which he keeps in a pouch. The fourth scene depicts him surrounded by prostitutes. The images starting with the fifth scene appear on the western cross wall, where the entrance is also located. There, the son arrives penniless at a herd of pigs, which he tends in the sixth scene. The seventh and eighth scenes, on the other side of the entrance, are preserved only in fragments. The ninth image, the only scene on the north wall, depicts the prodigal son’s return to his parents’ home. A presumed tenth scene has been preserved only as a fragment due to the installation of windows and is therefore no longer identifiable.

Above the doorway is a Lebenstreppe with a married couple, below which is the inscription "About man's age from one to one hundred years." All the paintings on the western cross wall were damaged during the construction of an organ loft (which no longer exists) in the 1870s. On the northern long side, three scenes relating to the sea are painted alongside the homecoming of the prodigal son. The first painting shows two fishing boats with fishermen casting their lines, while Jesus sits nearby on the beach with one hand raised in blessing. Above the boats, a city lies in the background. The second scene depicts Jonah and the whale, with a water deity and a nymph below. In the third scene, a fisherman is hauling in his full net, while another fisherman in his boat raises his hands in wonder or gratitude. On the eastern cross wall, north of the window, the Binding of Isaac is depicted, and on the southern side, above the pulpit, the Church Father Augustine of Hippo.

== Bibliography ==
- Albert Eskeröd: Gävlebornas strömmingsfiske. In: Ur Gävle stads historia. Edited by Philibert Humbla, Gävle 1946, pp. 321–360.
- Jan Moritz: Gävlefiskarna i Ångermanland. W-Sönst., Gävle 1992.
- Kjell E. G. Söderberg: Ulvö gamla kapell. Kulturnämnden i Örnsköldsviks kommun, Örnsköldsvik 1972.
- Kjell E. G. Söderberg: Ulvöhamn – två bilder ur ett fiskeläges historia. Göteborg 1995.
