= Gavleån =

Gävle River
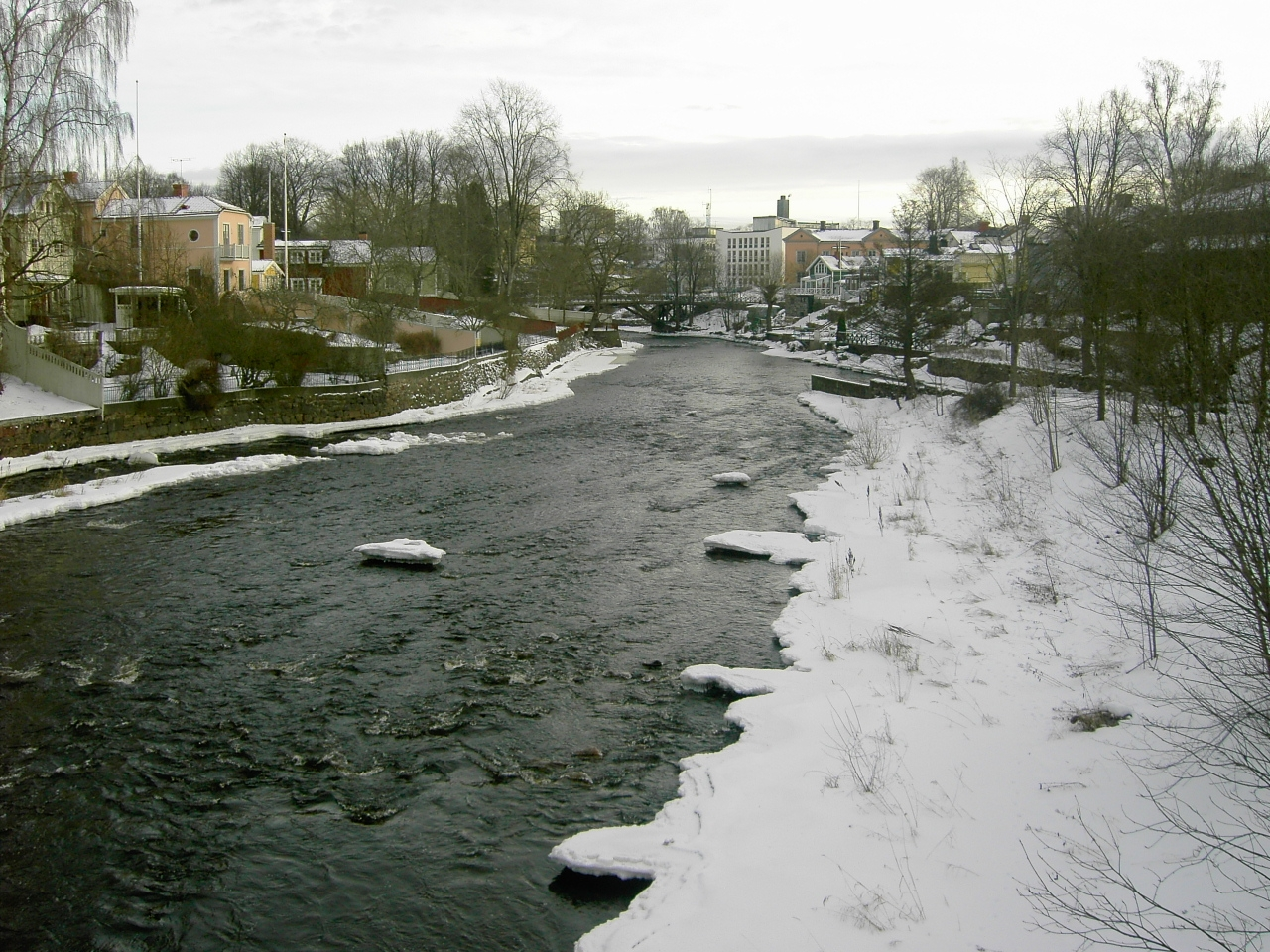
- Native name: Gavleån (Swedish)

Location
- Country: Sweden

Physical characteristics
- Mouth: Gävle Bay in the Bothnian Sea
  - location: Gävle
  - coordinates: 60°40′50″N 17°11′00″E
- Length: 129 km (80 mi)
- Basin size: 2,459.5 km^{2} (949.6 sq mi)
- Discharge
  - average: 21 m^{3}/s (740 cu ft/s)

Gavleån or Gävle River is a watercourse in the middle Gästrikland of Sweden from Storsjön to Gävle Bay (Gävlebukten) in the Bothnian Sea.
