= Axmarby =

Coordinates: 61°00′N 17°06′E

Axmarby (Swedish pronunciation: [aksmarˈbyː]) is a smaller locality in Gävle Municipality, Sweden. It has an athletics club called Axmarby IF.
