= Granön, Söderhamn =

Swedish peninsula

Granön
- Peninsula
- Location within Sweden
- Coordinates: 61.090899°N 17.196872°E
- Country: Sweden
- County: Gävleborg County
- Municipality: Söderhamn

Granön is a peninsula and the location of the Trollharen fishing village in the Söderhamn Municipality of Sweden. Until recently it was extremely isolated.

== Location ==
Granön is a peninsula in the extreme southeast of the Söderhamn Municipality. Trollharen is a small port on the east coast of peninsula on the Gulf of Bothnia. The Axmar Nature Reserve lies to the south and east of Trollharen, including the coastal strip and the off-shore islands.

== History ==
Taxation records from 1542 note the presence of farms on Granön. Over the years, the name was spelled differently: Grenöne, Granöna, Gränne, Grönö and Granö. In 1721, the Russians invaded the area, burning many of the coastal communities. According to legend Granön was spared because their pilot said there was only an old woman with some hens on Granön. For many years the farmers only had restricted fishing rights, as defined by the authorities in Gävle.

In the 1800s, Gävle lifted the restrictions on fishing. However, the fishing village of Trollharen, established on what was once an island, was probably only settled after 1850. Until the 1920s, the people lived in small cottages in Trollharen in the summer, then moved to permanent houses in Granöby for the winter months. The main catch was herring, sold fresh, salted, pickled or smoked. Other fish included salmon, whitefish, eel, pike, perch and later cod. The fishermen used to row with their catch to Söderhamn, a journey that took eight hours.

After World War I, increasing numbers of people moved to live permanently at Trollharen. On 10 October 1926, the Baltic cargo ship ran aground at Trollharen. She was refloated on 15 October. As late as 1928, Granön had only a few small farmhouses and associated fishing cottages and was most easily accessed by boat. The population peaked in the 1940s with 13 fishermen and their families. The last fisherman died in 1983, at the age of 80.

Today, the Granön Vägförening is a leisure area with 54 properties and about 25 hectares (62 acres) of land, including beaches and green space.
