= Elgin High School (Texas) =

Public high school in Elgin, Texas

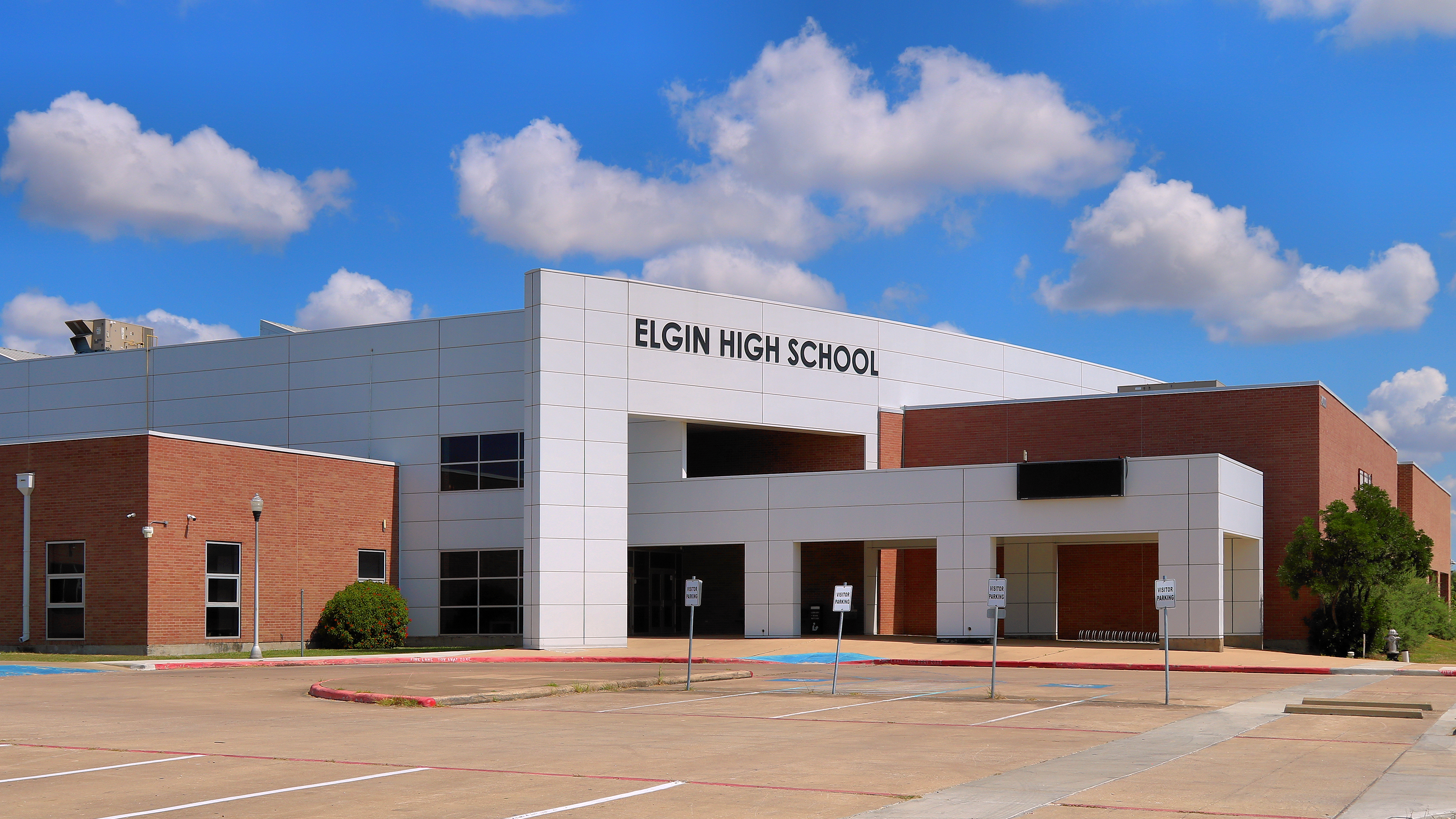

Location
- 14000 County Line Road; Elgin, Travis County, Texas 78621-2515; United States; 30.3662°N 97.4044°W

Information
- School type: Public, high school
- Locale: Rural: Fringe
- School district: Elgin ISD
- NCES School ID: 481836001728
- Principal: Dr. Jason Rodman
- Assistant principals: Kelsey Jones; Ernesto Wallace; Jesse Perez; Randy Mathisen
- Teaching staff: 92.06 (on an FTE basis)
- Grades: 9–12
- Enrollment: 1,808 (2025-2026)
- Student to teacher ratio: 19.32
- Colors: Purple & White
- Athletics conference: UIL Class 5A
- Mascot: Wildcat/Lady Wildcat
- Website: Elgin High School website

Elgin High School is a public high school located in Elgin, Texas (USA) and classified as a 5A school by the UIL. It is part of the Elgin Independent School District located in north central Bastrop County and extends westward into Travis County and eastward into Lee County. During 2025-2026, Elgin High School had an enrollment of 1,808 students. The school received an overall rating of "C" from the Texas Education Agency for the 2024–25 school year.

== Athletics ==
The Elgin Wildcats compete in the following sports

- Baseball
- Basketball
- Cross Country
- Football
- Golf
- Powerlifting
- Soccer
- Softball
- Swimming
- Tennis
- Track and Field
- Volleyball

=== State Titles ===
- Boys Powerlifting
  - 2022(5A) Abdias Castillo - 242 class
- Boys Powerlifting
  - 2021(5A) Jordan Hood - 308 class
- Boys Cross Country
  - 2007(3A)
- Boys Golf
  - 1959(1A), 1960(1A)
- Girls Powerlifting
  - 2022(5A) Nya Kirk Jones - 259 class
- Girls Track
  - 1987(3A)
