= Storjungfrun =

Island in Sweden

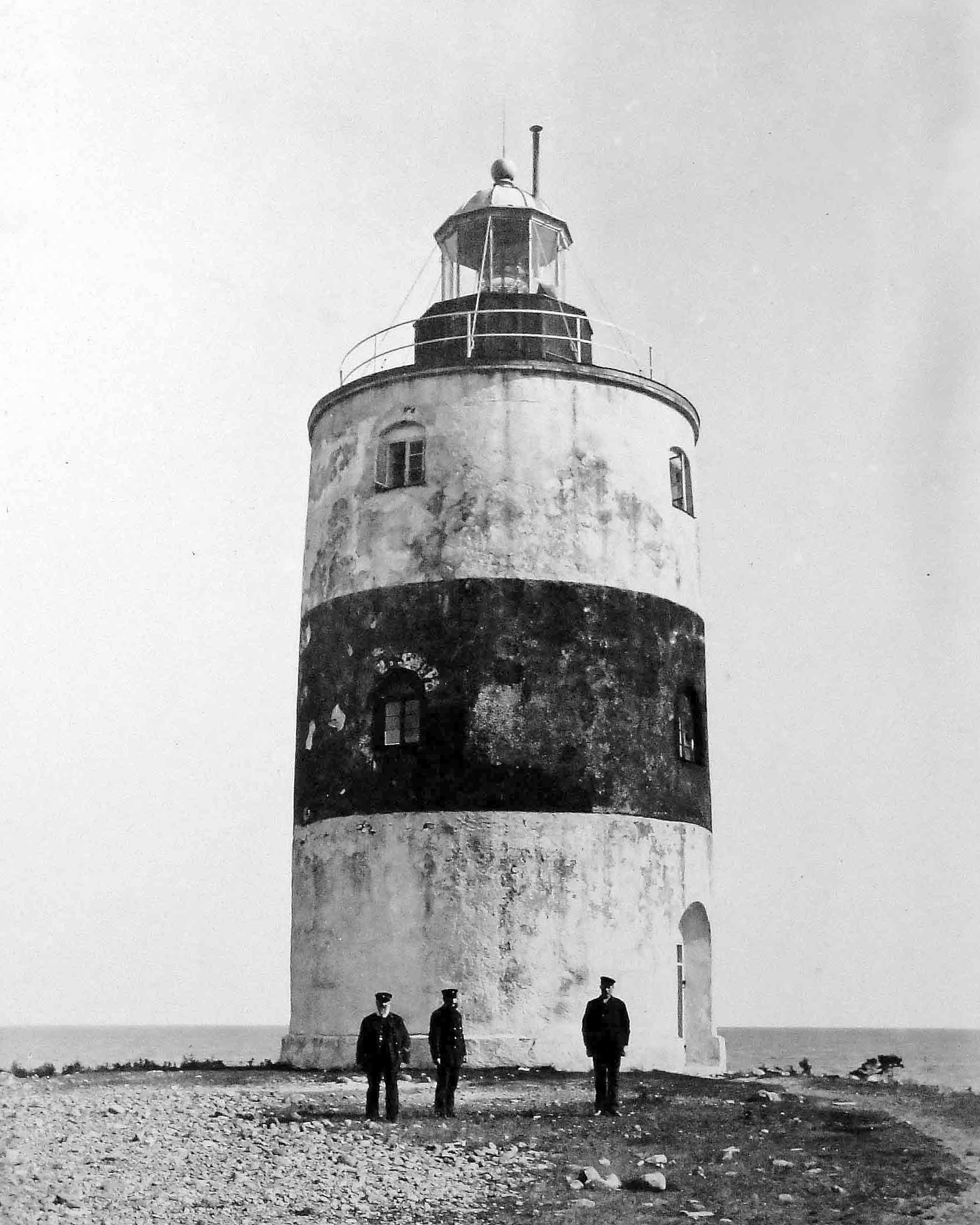
- Storjungfrun lighthouse

- Location within Sweden

Geography
- Location: Bothnian Sea
- Coordinates: 61°10′4″N 17°20′4.5″E
- Area: 3.13 km^{2} (1.21 sq mi)
- Highest elevation: 1 m (3 ft)

Administration
- Sweden
- County: Gävleborg
- Municipality: Söderhamn

Demographics
- Population: none

Additional information
- Time zone: CET (UTC+1)
  - Summer (DST): CEST (UTC+2)

Storjungfrun (formerly Stora Jungfrun), is an island in the Bothnian Sea that was granted by the crown in 1620 to the city of Söderhamn "for pasture". The island forms a nature reserve off the coast of Vallvik.

The current name has been in use since 1650. Previously the island was called Helgön.

For many years, Gävle fishermen fished around the island and also built the Storjungfrun chapel (SV). Over time, they were pushed back by the local population and eventually completely excluded. In the 1930s, there were around thirty people living in the harbor, which was significantly fewer than before.

In 1838, a lighthouse with a light positioned 27.5 meters above sea level was built on Storjungfrun. The lighthouse consists of a white, round, about 21.3 meter high stone tower with a black belt at the top under the lantern. It formerly also had a red middle belt. Since January 25, 1935, the lighthouse has been a listed building. The lighthouse was automated and demanned in 1964.
