= Rävskär =

Island in Nagu, Finland

Geography
- Coordinates: 59°52′6″N 23°18′55″E
- Adjacent to: Aspharudjupet channel

Administration
- Finland
- Region: Uusimaa
- Municipality: Raseborg

Additional information
- Time zone: EET (UTC+02:00)
  - Summer (DST): EEST (UTC+03:00)

Rävskär is an island in the Finnish archipelago, covering roughly 6 hectares with a perimeter of about 1 km. It is surrounded with some islets that are also part of the island.

Ravskar is situated in the middle of Koö, Gloskär, Grevskär and Svartholmen, and it belongs to the municipality of Raseborg.
