= New Sweden, Texas =

New Sweden
- Unincorporated community
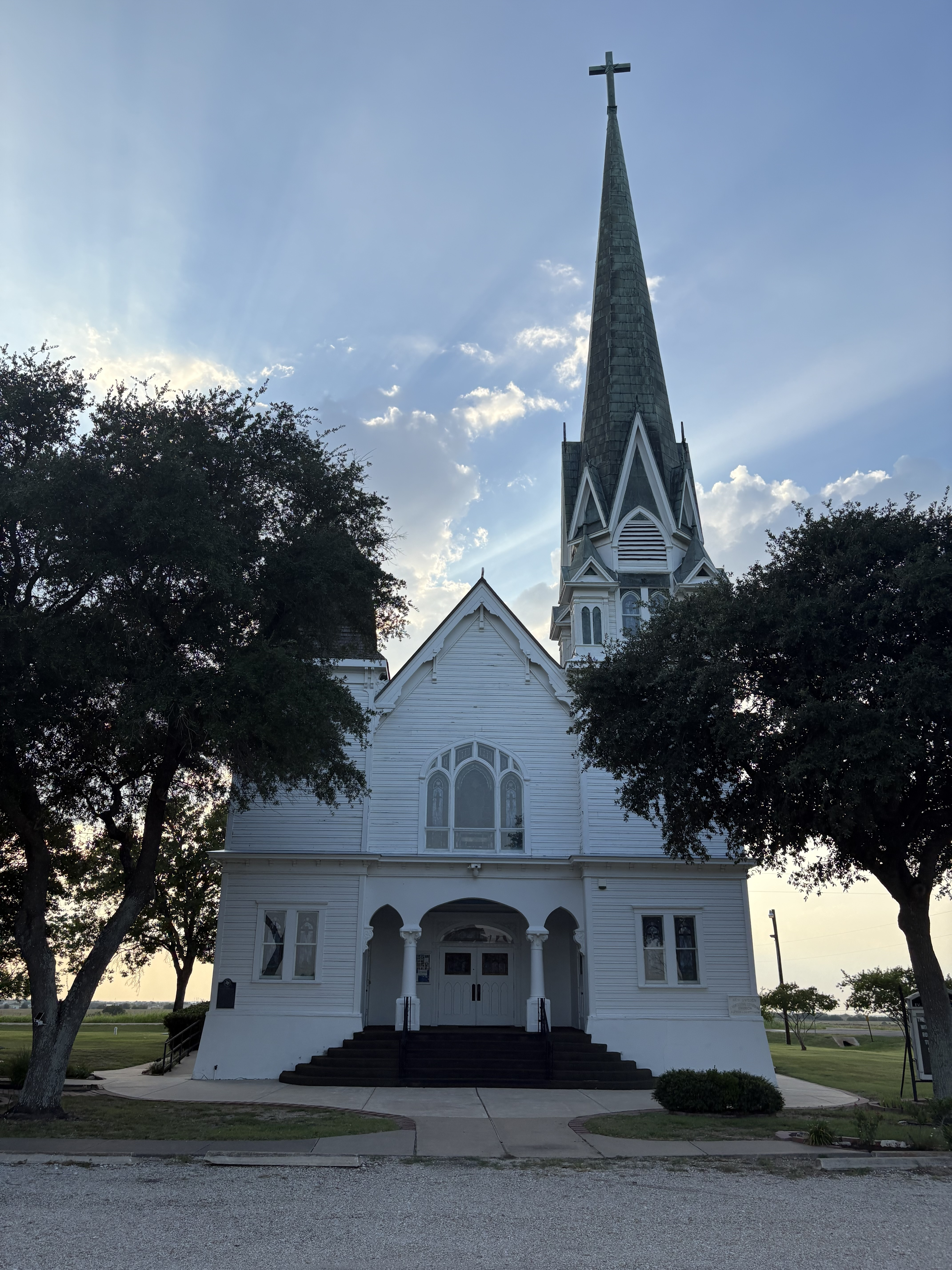
- Front of the New Sweden Evangelical Lutheran Church, New Sweden, Texas, August 2025

- Location within the state of Texas New Sweden (the United States)
- Coordinates: 30°24′31″N 97°30′47″W
- Country: United States
- State: Texas
- County: Travis
- Time zone: UTC-6 (Central (CST))
  - Summer (DST): UTC-5 (CDT)

New Sweden is a small unincorporated community in northeastern Travis County, Texas, United States. It is located within the Greater Austin metropolitan area.

== History ==
When it was founded in 1873, the community was known as Knight's Ranch; however, once the New Sweden Lutheran Church was built there in 1876, the name of the place changed to New Sweden (often written New Sweeden). In 1882, a cotton gin was put into service at New Sweden, and a post office followed in 1887. By the middle of the 1890s, the community had 42 residents and two general businesses. Its population had grown to 104 by 1900. Mail serving the neighborhood was delivered to Manor when the post office was shut down in 1902. The population had decreased to 25 by the early 1930s, but by the end of the decade, 60 people were living there and remained at that number through 1990.

The first pioneers of this settlement, with a few exceptions, came from the historic Swedish province of Småland. The church has a Manor mailing address. It is recognized by its steeple. In 2009, the estimated population was 60.

== Geography ==
New Sweden is on Farm to Market Road 973, five miles northeast of Manor in northeastern Travis County.

== Education ==
New Sweden hosted a common school district until it joined the Manda school district with other communities in the early 1940s.

Today, the community is served by the Manor Independent School District. Schools serving the community are Shadowglen Elementary School, Manor Middle School, and Manor High School.

== Gallery ==
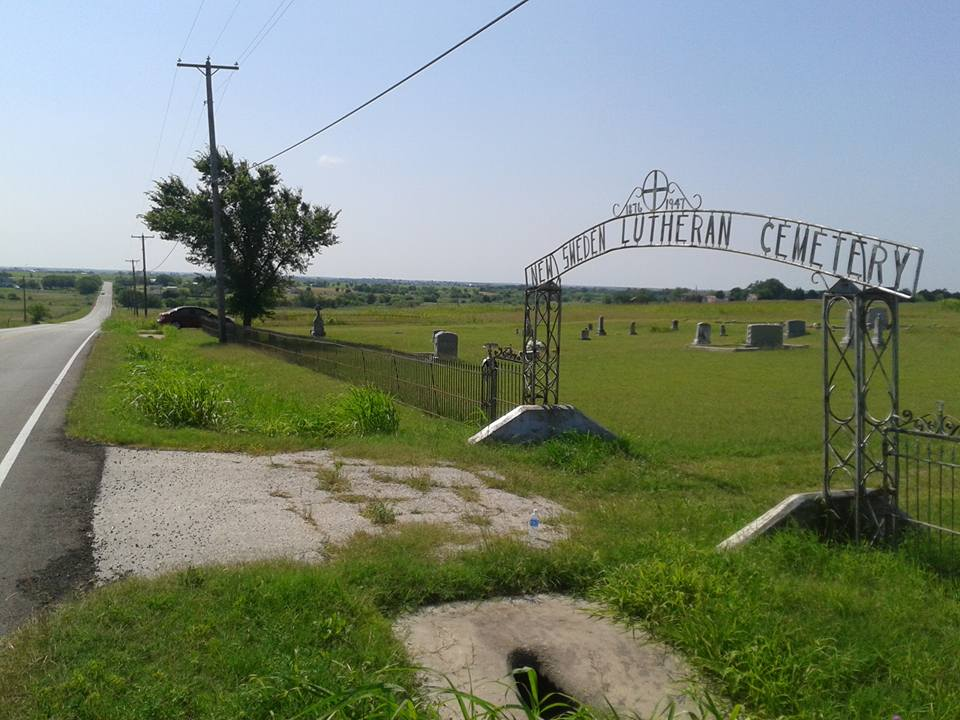
The New Sweden Lutheran Cemetery in New Sweden, Texas

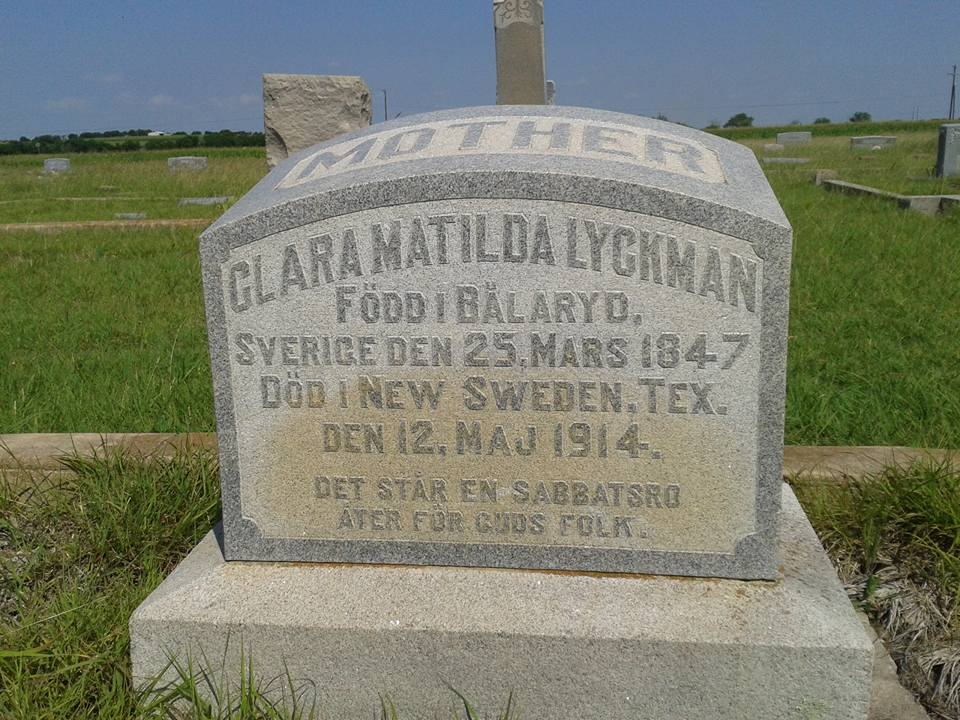
A gravestone written in Swedish at the Lutheran cemetery in New Sweden, Texas
