= Elgin Independent School District =

School district in Texas, United States

Location
- Elgin, Texas ESC Region 13 USA
- Coordinates: 30.3525°N 97.3773°W

District information
- Type: Public Independent school district
- Grades: EE through 12
- Superintendent: Jana Rueter
- Schools: 9 (2024–25)
- NCES District ID: 4818360

Students and staff
- Students: 5,941 (2024–25)
- Teachers: 310.1 (2024–25) (on full-time equivalent (FTE) basis)
- Student–teacher ratio: 19.21 (2024–25)

Other information
- Website: Elgin ISD

Elgin Independent School District is a public school district based in Elgin, Texas (USA).

The district is located in northern Bastrop County, includes parts of Manor, and extends into small portions of Travis and Lee counties.

In 2009, the school district was rated "academically acceptable" by the Texas Education Agency.

== Schools ==
As of the 2024–2025 school year, the district operates nine schools.

High schools

- Elgin High School (Grades 9-12)

Middle schools

- Elgin Middle School (Grades 7-8)
- Middle School No. 2 (opening 2027)
- Elgin Intermediate School (Grades 5-6)

Elementary schools

- Booker T. Washington Elementary School (Grades K-5)
- Elgin Elementary School (Grades EE-5)
- Harvest Ridge Elementary School (Grades PK-5)
- Neidig Elementary School (Grades K-5)
- Trinity Ranch Elementary School (Grades PK-5)
- Elementary No. 6 (opening date TBA)

Alternative schools

- Phoenix High School (Grades 9-12)
- Bastrop County Juvenile Boot Camp (Grades 7-12)
