= Lunds ASK =

Swedish chess club

- Type: Competitive Chess Club
- Founded: 1906 (Originally); 1956 (Restarted)
- Location: Lund
- Country: Sweden
- Major events: Lund Open; LASK Open; Lund Blitz Open
- Website: Official Website

Lunds ASK or Lund's Academic Chess Club (Lunds Akademiska Schackklubb) is a Premier League chess club who play in Lund, Sweden, and were founded in 1906. The team originally consisted of people connected to Lund University. Between 1920 and 1956, the club did not have any activity.

After being restarted in 1956, the team won the Swedish national premier league eight times: 1965, 1966, 1967, 1970, 1972, 1976, 1977, and 1978. Following each of the league wins, they represented Sweden in the European Club Cup. They currently play in the premier league (Elitserien) and in 2006 they came second.

== Notable games ==
Ivan Sokolov v Niclas Hjelm, Swedish Team Championship, Lunds ASK, 16 March 2001

1. d4 d5 2. c4 dxc4 3. Nf3 Nf6 4. e3 e6 5. Bxc4 a6 6. O-O c5 7. Qe2 b5 8. Bb3 Bb7 9. a4 b4 10. Nbd2 Nbd7 11. Nc4 Be7 12. a5 O-O 13. Bd2 Qc7 14. Rfc1 Rac8 15. Ba4 Bc6 16. Bxc6 Qxc6 17. Nce5 Qb7 18. Nxd7 Nxd7 19. Be1 Rc7 20. Rc2 Rfc8 21. Rac1 h6 22. h3 Bd6 23. dxc5 Rxc5 24. Nd4 R8c7 25. Rxc5 Nxc5 26. Rc4 Nd7 27. Rc2 Rxc2 28. Qf1 Rc4 29. Qxc4 Ne5 30. Qc2 Nd7 31. b3 Bc5 32. Qc4 Qe4 33. Qxa6 Bxd4 34. Qc8+ Nf8 35. Bxb4 Be5 36. Qxf8+ Kh7 37. Be1 1-0

Predrag Nikolić v Alexander Chernin, Swedish Team Championship, Lunds ASK, 16 March 2001

1. d4 Nf6 2. c4 e6 3. Nf3 d5 4. Nc3 Bb4 5. Bg5 dxc4 6. e4 c5 7. Bxc4 cxd4 8. Nxd4 Bxc3+ 9. bxc3 Qa5 10. Nb5 a6 11. Nd6+ Ke7 12. f4 Nc6 13. Qd2 Rd8 14. Rd1 e5 15. Nxc8+ Raxc8 16. Bd5 Qc5 17. Rf1 Rd6 18. c4 Kf8 19. fxe5 Nxe5 20. Be3 Qa3 21. Bd4 Nxe4 22. Qb2 Qxb2 23. Bxb2 Nxc4 24. Rxf7+ Ke8 25. Bxg7 Ne3 26. Rf8+ Kd7 27. Rxc8 Nxd1 28. Bxb7 Nef2 29. Rc2 Nd3+ 30. Ke2 Nf4+ 31. Kf3 Ng6 32. g3 1-0

== Notable members ==
- Leif Erlend Johannessen
