= Årsunda =

- Coat of arms

- Location within Sweden Gävleborg Location within Sweden
- Coordinates: 60°32′N 16°44′E
- Country: Sweden
- Province: Gästrikland
- County: Gävleborg County
- Municipality: Sandviken Municipality

Area
  - Total: 1.25 km^{2} (0.48 sq mi)

Population (31 December 2010)
  - Total: 1,008
  - Density: 805/km^{2} (2,080/sq mi)
- Time zone: UTC+1 (CET)
  - Summer (DST): UTC+2 (CEST)

Årsunda is a locality situated in Sandviken Municipality, Gävleborg County, Sweden with 1,008 inhabitants in 2010.

== Sports ==
The following sports clubs are located in Årsunda:

- Årsunda IF
