= Årsunda IF =

Swedish football club

- Full name: Årsunda Idrottsförening
- Nickname(s): ÅIF
- Ground: Årsunda IP; Årsunda; Sweden
- Chairman: Anders Andersson
- League: Division 4 Gestrikland
Home colours	Away colours

Årsunda IF is a Swedish football club located in Årsunda.

== Background ==
Årsunda IF currently plays in Division 4 Gestrikland which is the sixth tier of Swedish football. They play their home matches at the Årsunda IP in Årsunda.

The club is affiliated to Gestriklands Fotbollförbund. Årsunda IF have competed in the Svenska Cupen on 17 occasions and have played 24 matches in the competition.

== Season to season ==
In their most successful period Årsunda IF competed in the following divisions:

Season	Level	Division	Section	Position	Movements
1966	Tier 4	Division 4	Gästrikland	1st	Promoted
1967	Tier 3	Division 3	Norra Svealand	2nd	
1968	Tier 3	Division 3	Södra Norrland Nedre	8th	
1969	Tier 3	Division 3	Södra Norrland Nedre	10th	Relegated
1970	Tier 4	Division 4	Gästrikland	2nd	

In recent seasons Årsunda IF have competed in the following divisions:

Season	Level	Division	Section	Position	Movements
2006*	Tier 7	Division 5	Gästrikland	7th	
2007	Tier 7	Division 5	Gästrikland	2nd	Promoted
2008	Tier 6	Division 4	Gästrikland	10th	
2009	Tier 6	Division 4	Gästrikland	10th	
2010	Tier 6	Division 4	Gästrikland	5th	
2011	Tier 6	Division 4	Gästrikland	7th	

* League restructuring in 2006 resulted in a new division being created at Tier 3 and subsequent divisions dropping a level.
