= Gävle Municipality =

Gävle Municipality Gävle kommun
- Municipality
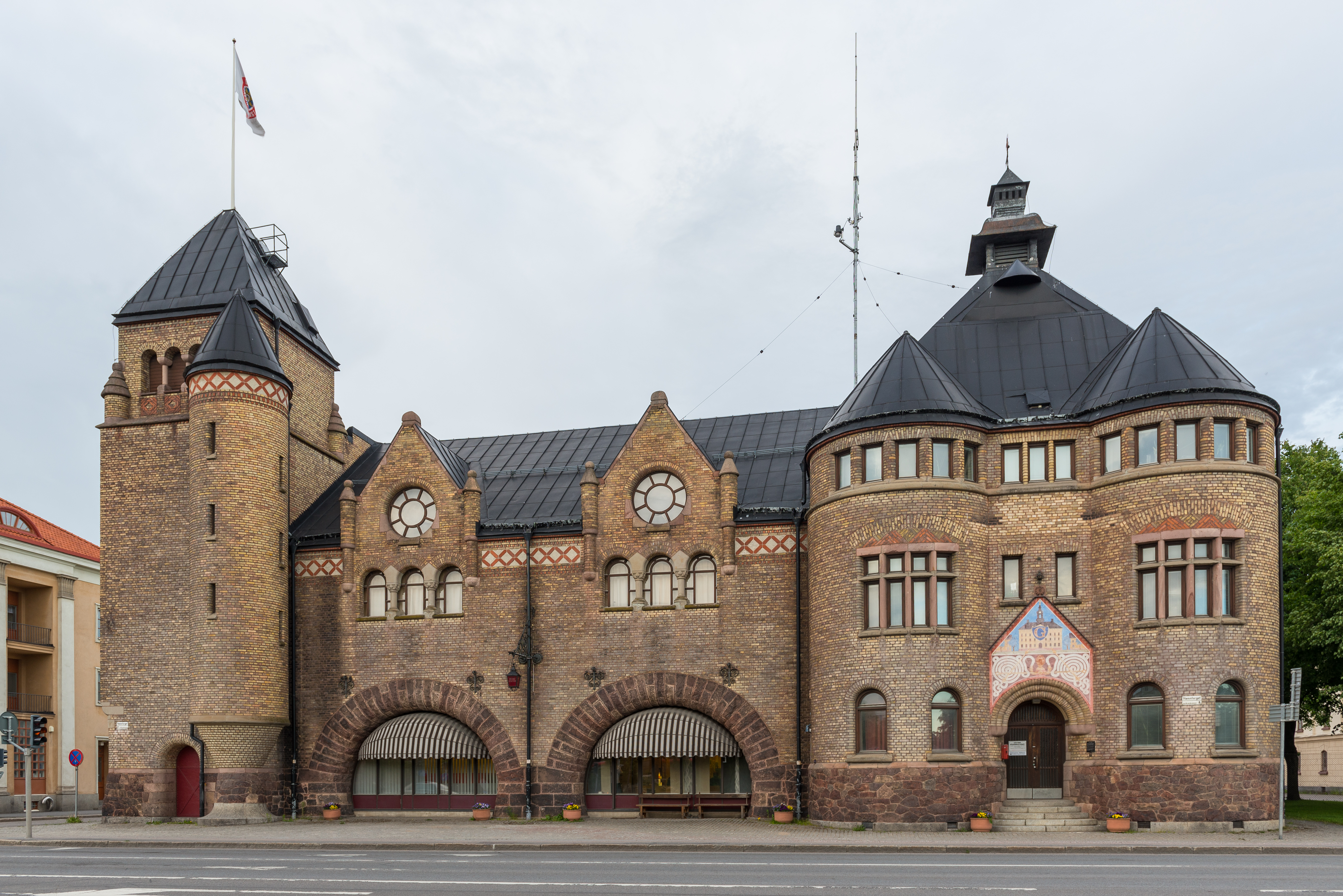
- Gävle Firestation

- Coat of arms

- Coordinates: 60°40′N 17°10′E
- Country: Sweden
- County: Gävleborg County
- Seat: Gävle

Area
  - Total: 3,199.84 km^{2} (1,235.47 sq mi)
  - Land: 1,613.37 km^{2} (622.93 sq mi)
  - Water: 1,586.47 km^{2} (612.54 sq mi)
- Area as of 1 January 2014.

Population (30 June 2025)
  - Total: 104,030
  - Density: 64.480/km^{2} (167.00/sq mi)
- Time zone: UTC+1 (CET)
  - Summer (DST): UTC+2 (CEST)
- ISO 3166 code: SE
- Province: Gästrikland
- Municipal code: 2180
- Website: www.gavle.se

Gävle Municipality (Swedish: Gävle kommun) is a municipality in east central Sweden. The municipal seat is located in the Stad (city) of Gävle.

Geographically the municipality is situated north of the mouth of the river Dalälven and is the southernmost municipality of the historical land of Norrland.

The present municipality was created in 1971, when the City of Gävle was amalgamated with four surrounding rural municipalities. All of them were original entities, instituted as municipalities by the local government acts of 1862. The area had not been affected by the national subdivision reform in 1952.

== Geography ==
Gävle is situated by the Baltic Sea near the mouth of the river Dalälven. At 60 degrees north and 17 degrees east, Gävle has the same latitude as Helsinki and the same longitude as Vienna and Cape Town.

Gävle has a similar continental climate to the rest of central Sweden with an average temperature of −5 °C (23 °F) in January and 17 °C (63 °F) in July. Yearly rainfall is around 600 mm (24 in).

=== Localities ===
Data from 2000.

| Town | Population | Area (km^{2}) |
|---|---|---|
| Gävle | 92,681 | 41.58 |
| Valbo | 6,984 | 8.14 |
| Forsbacka | 1,716 | 1.71 |
| Hedesunda | 1,071 | 1.67 |
| Norrsundet | 1,044 | 1.89 |
| Bergby | 834 | 1.91 |
| Forsby | 617 | 0.87 |
| Hamrångefjärden | 558 | 1.57 |
| Furuvik | 472 | 0.96 |
| Åbyggeby | 457 | 0.87 |
| Lund | 380 | 1.14 |
| Björke | 362 | 0.58 |
| Trödje | 321 | 0.67 |
| Bönan | 273 | 0.65 |
| Totra | 255 | 0.76 |
| Berg | 231 | 0.51 |
| Hagsta | 206 | 0.74 |

== Economy ==
Major employers in Gävle:

1. Gävle Municipality 8,000
2. County Council 8,000
3. Stora Enso 1,200
4. Ericsson 1,100
5. BillerudKorsnäs 1,100
6. Lantmäteriet 900

=== Whisky ===
Mackmyra Whisky in Valbo, a suburb of Gävle, is the only whisky distillery in Sweden. Malt whisky is produced since 1999.

== Demographics ==
This is a demographic table based on Gävle Municipality's electoral districts in the 2022 Swedish general election sourced from SVT's election platform, in turn taken from SCB official statistics.

In total there were 78,868 Swedish citizens of voting age resident in the municipality. 48.9% voted for the left coalition and 49.8% for the right coalition. Indicators are in percentage points except population totals and income.

| Location | Residents | Citizen adults | Left vote | Right vote | Employed | Swedish parents | Foreign heritage | Income SEK | Degree |
| Location | | | % | % | | | | | |
|---|---|---|---|---|---|---|---|---|---|
| Andersberg C | 2,576 | 1,324 | 74.7 | 20.5 | 49 | 25 | 75 | 12,443 | 19 |
| Andersberg N | 1,720 | 1,276 | 53.3 | 44.3 | 73 | 67 | 33 | 24,148 | 40 |
| Andersberg-Sälgsjön | 1,859 | 1,476 | 49.6 | 49.6 | 81 | 81 | 19 | 27,276 | 40 |
| Bergby-Axmar | 1,683 | 1,416 | 42.9 | 55.6 | 82 | 93 | 7 | 23,236 | 25 |
| Björke-Trödje | 2,124 | 1,708 | 37.4 | 61.6 | 88 | 94 | 6 | 29,602 | 37 |
| Bomhus C | 1,629 | 1,155 | 48.9 | 50.6 | 89 | 87 | 13 | 30,616 | 49 |
| Bomhus N | 1,796 | 1,381 | 42.7 | 56.1 | 82 | 85 | 15 | 27,566 | 38 |
| Bomhus SO | 1,861 | 1,370 | 51.1 | 47.5 | 82 | 85 | 15 | 25,202 | 33 |
| Bomhus SV | 2,010 | 1,434 | 49.0 | 49.9 | 85 | 85 | 15 | 28,901 | 41 |
| Bomhus V | 2,108 | 1,482 | 50.9 | 48.0 | 71 | 74 | 26 | 20,459 | 35 |
| Bomhus Ö | 2,018 | 1,553 | 42.9 | 56.7 | 89 | 90 | 10 | 30,638 | 40 |
| Brynäs C | 1,999 | 1,732 | 55.6 | 42.2 | 72 | 76 | 24 | 21,964 | 35 |
| Brynäs S | 2,024 | 1,619 | 55.7 | 42.4 | 72 | 67 | 33 | 22,721 | 39 |
| Brynäs V | 1,800 | 1,339 | 56.9 | 40.9 | 71 | 62 | 38 | 21,588 | 35 |
| Brynäs Ö | 2,075 | 1,546 | 55.8 | 41.6 | 68 | 60 | 40 | 20,873 | 31 |
| Forsbacka | 1,892 | 1,545 | 46.4 | 53.1 | 78 | 87 | 13 | 25,011 | 32 |
| Fridhem | 1,716 | 1,226 | 50.8 | 48.0 | 92 | 90 | 10 | 34,474 | 68 |
| Furuvik-Ytterharnäs | 1,367 | 1,016 | 39.8 | 59.6 | 87 | 92 | 8 | 29,847 | 42 |
| Gävle Strand | 1,696 | 1,563 | 45.2 | 53.8 | 80 | 79 | 21 | 31,057 | 47 |
| Hagaström C | 2,162 | 1,572 | 50.8 | 48.2 | 90 | 93 | 7 | 32,233 | 60 |
| Hedesunda N | 1,324 | 1,057 | 34.9 | 64.0 | 82 | 92 | 8 | 23,444 | 24 |
| Hedesunda S | 1,381 | 1,119 | 39.9 | 58.5 | 87 | 94 | 6 | 25,984 | 31 |
| Hemlingby | 2,249 | 1,709 | 42.7 | 56.6 | 90 | 92 | 8 | 33,071 | 56 |
| Hemsta | 1,671 | 1,484 | 54.2 | 44.5 | 78 | 81 | 19 | 24,991 | 43 |
| Hille | 2,319 | 1,718 | 45.1 | 54.2 | 89 | 95 | 5 | 30,366 | 48 |
| Nordost | 2,029 | 1,363 | 64.4 | 33.6 | 58 | 33 | 67 | 15,621 | 25 |
| Norr | 1,304 | 1,128 | 47.0 | 52.1 | 83 | 81 | 19 | 26,267 | 49 |
| Norrlandet-Utvalnäs | 2,317 | 1,766 | 37.0 | 62.6 | 88 | 92 | 8 | 35,076 | 35 |
| Norrsundet-Hamrångef. | 1,655 | 1,334 | 49.3 | 49.8 | 73 | 89 | 11 | 21,631 | 22 |
| Norrtull-Lexe | 2,103 | 1,805 | 51.5 | 47.9 | 84 | 88 | 12 | 29,883 | 56 |
| Olsbacka | 1,569 | 1,168 | 50.1 | 49.3 | 85 | 87 | 13 | 30,740 | 57 |
| Stigslund | 2,209 | 1,780 | 47.9 | 51.4 | 85 | 89 | 11 | 27,352 | 46 |
| Strömsbro | 2,391 | 1,930 | 45.2 | 54.3 | 88 | 93 | 7 | 31,506 | 56 |
| Sätra C | 2,120 | 1,551 | 60.5 | 37.7 | 63 | 60 | 40 | 17,831 | 36 |
| Sätra NO | 2,201 | 1,520 | 61.3 | 35.3 | 70 | 56 | 44 | 20,414 | 38 |
| Sätra NV | 2,200 | 1,596 | 53.2 | 45.1 | 83 | 74 | 26 | 29,093 | 52 |
| Sätra V | 2,280 | 1,558 | 52.1 | 46.2 | 80 | 73 | 27 | 25,727 | 43 |
| Sätra Ö | 2,902 | 1,539 | 60.9 | 35.0 | 54 | 32 | 68 | 11,899 | 34 |
| Söder V | 2,123 | 1,881 | 49.6 | 48.8 | 79 | 80 | 20 | 25,261 | 42 |
| Söder Ö | 2,155 | 1,846 | 49.3 | 48.0 | 79 | 79 | 21 | 24,303 | 42 |
| Södertull | 1,867 | 1,710 | 49.0 | 49.8 | 78 | 85 | 15 | 24,406 | 45 |
| Sörby | 2,432 | 1,770 | 54.1 | 43.6 | 76 | 72 | 28 | 23,291 | 44 |
| Valbo C | 2,123 | 1,601 | 45.5 | 53.1 | 83 | 90 | 10 | 26,306 | 34 |
| Valbo N | 2,081 | 1,683 | 46.5 | 52.3 | 77 | 86 | 14 | 22,290 | 32 |
| Valbo V | 2,174 | 1,631 | 44.0 | 55.7 | 90 | 95 | 5 | 31,360 | 44 |
| Valbo Ö-Hagaström | 2,518 | 1,907 | 42.7 | 56.7 | 90 | 93 | 7 | 31,798 | 45 |
| Vallbacken | 2,054 | 1,753 | 52.7 | 46.0 | 80 | 85 | 15 | 26,492 | 52 |
| Villastaden | 2,215 | 1,812 | 42.4 | 57.1 | 66 | 86 | 14 | 24,501 | 65 |
| Väster N | 1,813 | 1,666 | 48.5 | 49.8 | 83 | 85 | 15 | 27,724 | 52 |
| Väster S | 1,448 | 1,314 | 49.0 | 50.2 | 81 | 81 | 19 | 24,479 | 41 |
| Åbyggeby | 2,162 | 1,555 | 39.7 | 59.8 | 91 | 95 | 5 | 31,767 | 44 |
| Öster-Alderholmen | 1,432 | 881 | 65.5 | 30.7 | 59 | 36 | 64 | 16,442 | 29 |
Source: SVT

== Politics ==
The municipal assembly (kommunfullmäktige) has 65 members, elected for a four-year period. The last election was held in September 2022. Eight parties are represented in the assembly. The largest party is the Swedish Social Democratic Party which has 21 seats. The current chairman of the municipal assembly is the liberal Per-Åke Fredriksson, with the current chairman of the municipal executive committee (kommunstyrelsen) is Åsa Wiklund Lång.

== Education ==
The University College of Gävle currently enrolls 12,500 students.

It offers courses of study at six departments: Business Administration, Education and Psychology, Caring Sciences and Sociology, Humanities and Social Sciences, Mathematics, Natural and Computer Sciences and Technology, and Built Environment.

Some courses are given in English taught both to visiting students from foreign partner institutions and to Swedish students.

== Twin towns – sister cities ==
Gävle is twinned with:

- Galva, United States
- Gjøvik, Norway
- Jūrmala, Latvia
- Næstved, Denmark
- Rauma, Finland

== See also ==
- Municipalities of Sweden
- List of Swedish municipalities
- International Ice Hockey Federation World Championships (1995)
- List of Gävleborg Governors
