= Gästrikland =

Historical province of Sweden

Coordinates: 60°33′25″N 16°47′35″E

- Historical province
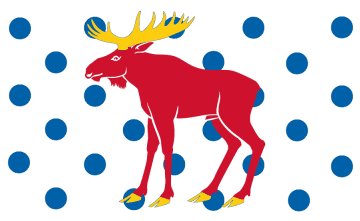
- Flag Coat of arms

- Country: Sweden
- Land: Norrland
- Counties: Gävleborg County; Uppsala County

Area
  - Total: 4,200 km^{2} (1,600 sq mi)

Population (31 December 2023)
  - Total: 156,869
  - Density: 37/km^{2} (97/sq mi)

Ethnicity
  - Language: Swedish

Culture
  - Flower: Convallaria
  - Animal: Capercaillie
  - Bird: Black-throated diver
  - Fish: Baltic herring
- Time zone: UTC+1 (CET)
  - Summer (DST): UTC+2 (CEST)

Gästrikland (Swedish pronunciation: [ˈjɛ̌sːtrɪkland]) is a historical province or landskap on the eastern coast of Sweden. It borders Uppland, Västmanland, Dalarna, Hälsingland and the Gulf of Bothnia. Gästrikland is the southernmost and the most densely populated of the Norrland provinces.

The Latin name of the province is Gestricia. Before 1900, the spelling Gestrikland was also used in Swedish.

== Administration ==
The traditional provinces of Sweden serve no administrative or political purposes, but are historical and cultural entities. In the case of Gästrikland the province constitutes the southern part of the administrative county, län, Gävleborg County.

== Heraldry ==
Arms granted in 1560. As with other provinces the arms is represented with a ducal coronet. Blazon: "Argent Hurty an Elk statant Gules attired and hoofed Or." A coat of arms for Gävleborg County was granted in 1938, combining the arms of Gästrikland and Hälsingland.

== Geography ==
Gästrikland is often called the gate to Norrland (the northern Sweden part that is traditionally considered scarcely populated, largely unexplored until the 15th century, and with a terrain dominated by forests, mountains and lakes). Gästrikland was often called the gate to Norrland because from Gästrikland people went on to the north part of Sweden.

The province uses the slogan "the Iron Kingdom" ("Järnriket").

The main parts of Gästrikland consists of plains, which in the south and east transcends into fertile agricultural areas. To the north the west the terrain becomes hilly and forest covered, unsuitable for agrarian tasks. In the north-western corner one also finds Gästrikland's highest mountain, the Lustigknopp (literally "Funny-hood"), of 402 meters height; this mountain also constitutes the meeting point of the three provinces Gästrikland, Hälsingland and Dalarna.

Few larger water areas are found, but a multitude of small ones, and of the total area around 1/10 is water. Its largest lake is Storsjön with an area of 72 km^{2}, in its central parts.

Gästrikland has one National park: Färnebofjärden.

=== Sub-divisions ===
The sub-division of municipalities is done within the county, not the province. But as the province coincide with the southern municipal borders in Gävleborg County, the following municipalities are in effect located in Gästrikland:

1. Gävle Municipality
2. Sandviken Municipality
3. Hofors Municipality
4. Ockelbo Municipality

For tourism purposes Älvkarleby Municipality is also considered a part of Gästrikland.

Historically, Gästrikland was sub-divided into chartered cities and court districts. Its cities were: Gävle (chartered around 1400) and Sandviken (chartered in 1943). Its two court districts were Gästriklands västra tingslag and Gästriklands östra tingslag.

== Elections ==
=== Riksdag ===
Year	%	Votes	V	S	MP	C	L	KD	M	SD	NyD	Other
1973	89.8	95,368	7.3	54.6		20.9	7.1	1.3	8.3			0.4
1976	90.9	101,185	5.6	55.2		20.1	8.8	1.0	8.8			0.4
1979	90.4	101,356	6.2	56.2		14.6	8.9	1.0	12.5			0.6
1982	91.5	103,288	6.3	58.2	1.6	11.9	4.7	1.2	15.9			0.2
1985	89.7	101,893	6.6	56.7	1.4	8.9	11.9		14.0			0.5
1988	85.6	96,422	7.1	54.8	4.8	8.7	10.9	2.1	11.0			0.7
1991	86.3	96,601	5.6	50.1	3.1	6.3	8.8	5.1	14.2		6.2	0.6
1994	86.2	95,893	7.5	56.2	4.8	5.6	6.8	2.6	14.8		1.2	0.5
1998	80.4	88,102	16.1	45.0	4.6	4.0	4.0	9.1	15.8			1.3
2002	78.6	86,428	11.0	48.6	4.4	5.4	11.1	6.9	10.5	1.3		0.7
2006	80.6	89,278	8.1	43.2	4.6	7.0	6.3	4.6	20.1	3.1		2.9
2010	84.3	95,294	7.4	38.2	6.6	5.2	6.1	3.7	24.6	7.1		1.2
2014	86.4	99,021	7.0	37.5	5.3	4.8	4.5	3.0	18.7	15.9		3.3
2018	87.2	100,971	8.6	33.7	3.3	6.5	4.9	4.8	16.6	20.4		1.3

== History ==
Gästrikland was a part of Uppland until 14th or 15th century. Mining and iron production became important industries in the 5th century and the iron works of Hofors and Sandviken still employ about 6,500 people, producing specialized steel and other special metals.

== Sports ==
Football in the province is administered by Gestriklands Fotbollförbund. Ice hockey is also popular, with Brynäs IF.
