= Lund tramway =

Tramway in Lund, Sweden

- A tram on the Lund tramway (2024)

Operation
- Locale: Lund, Sweden
- Open: 13 December 2020
- Status: In use
- Routes: 1
- Owner: Lund Municipality
- Operator: Keolis tendered by Skånetrafiken

Infrastructure
- Track gauge: 1,435 mm (4 ft 8 1/2 in) standard gauge
- Propulsion system: Electric
- Electrification: 750 V DC catenary

Statistics
- Route length: 5.5 km (3.4 mi)

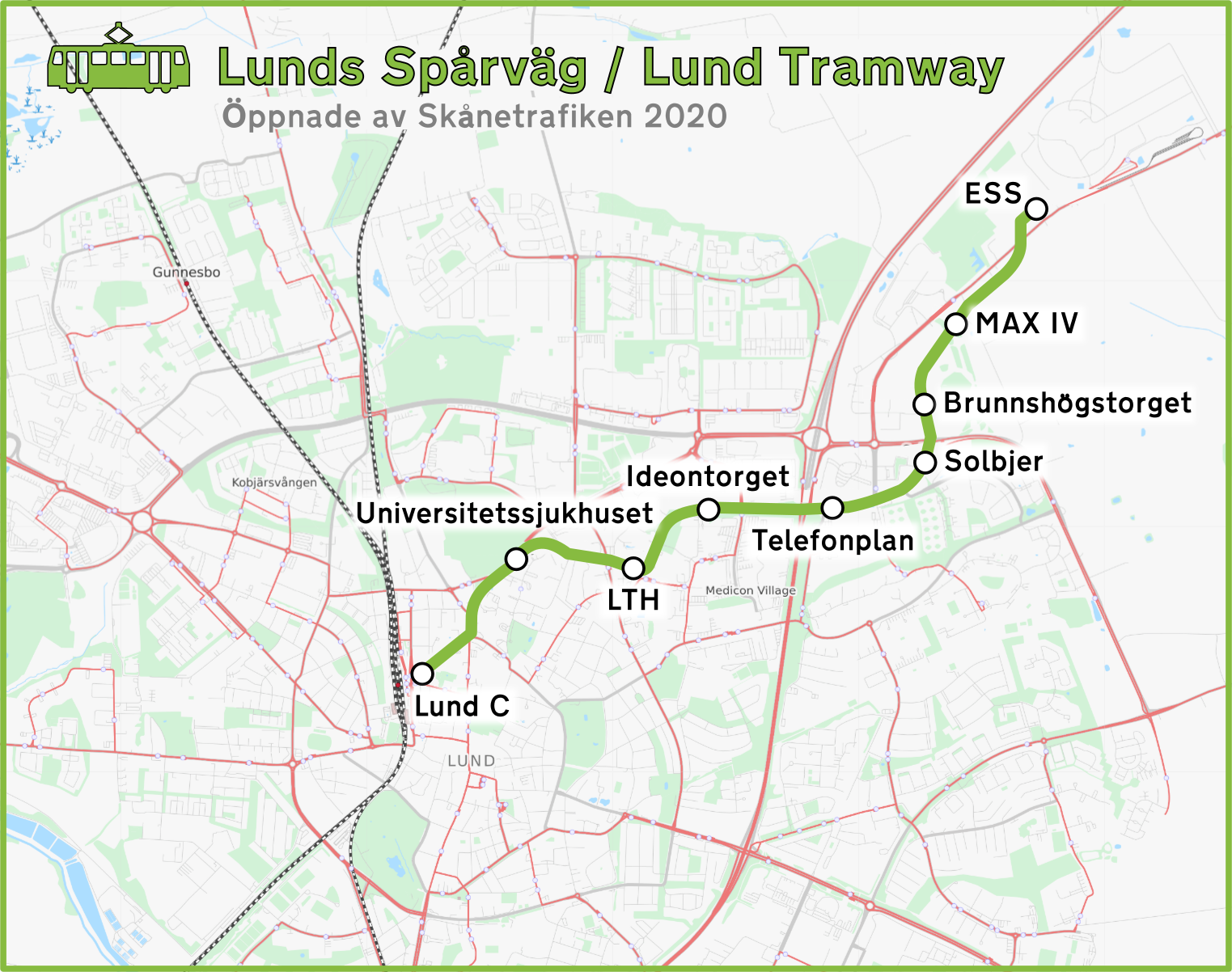

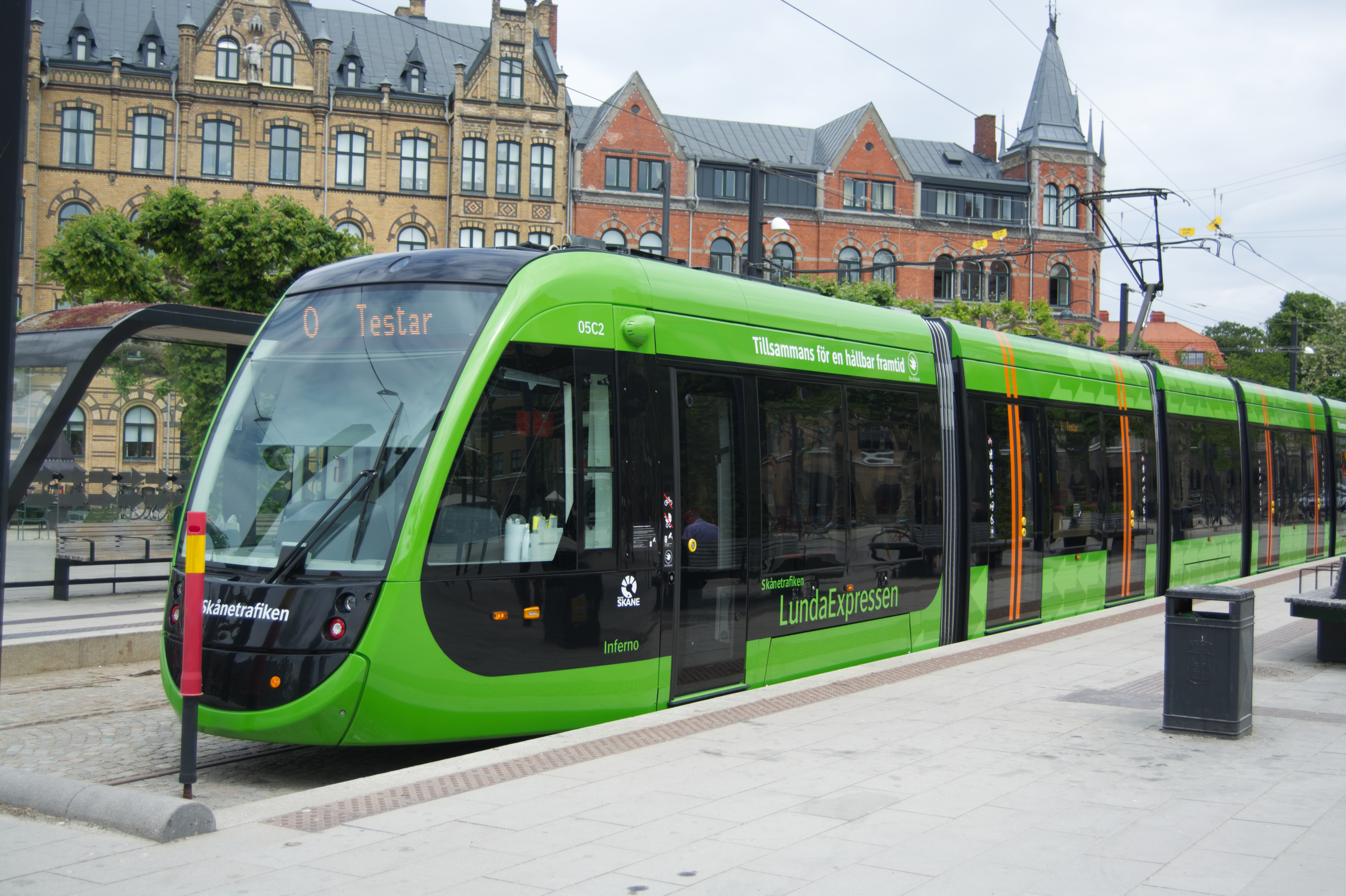
Tram stop Clemenstorget, near Lund C

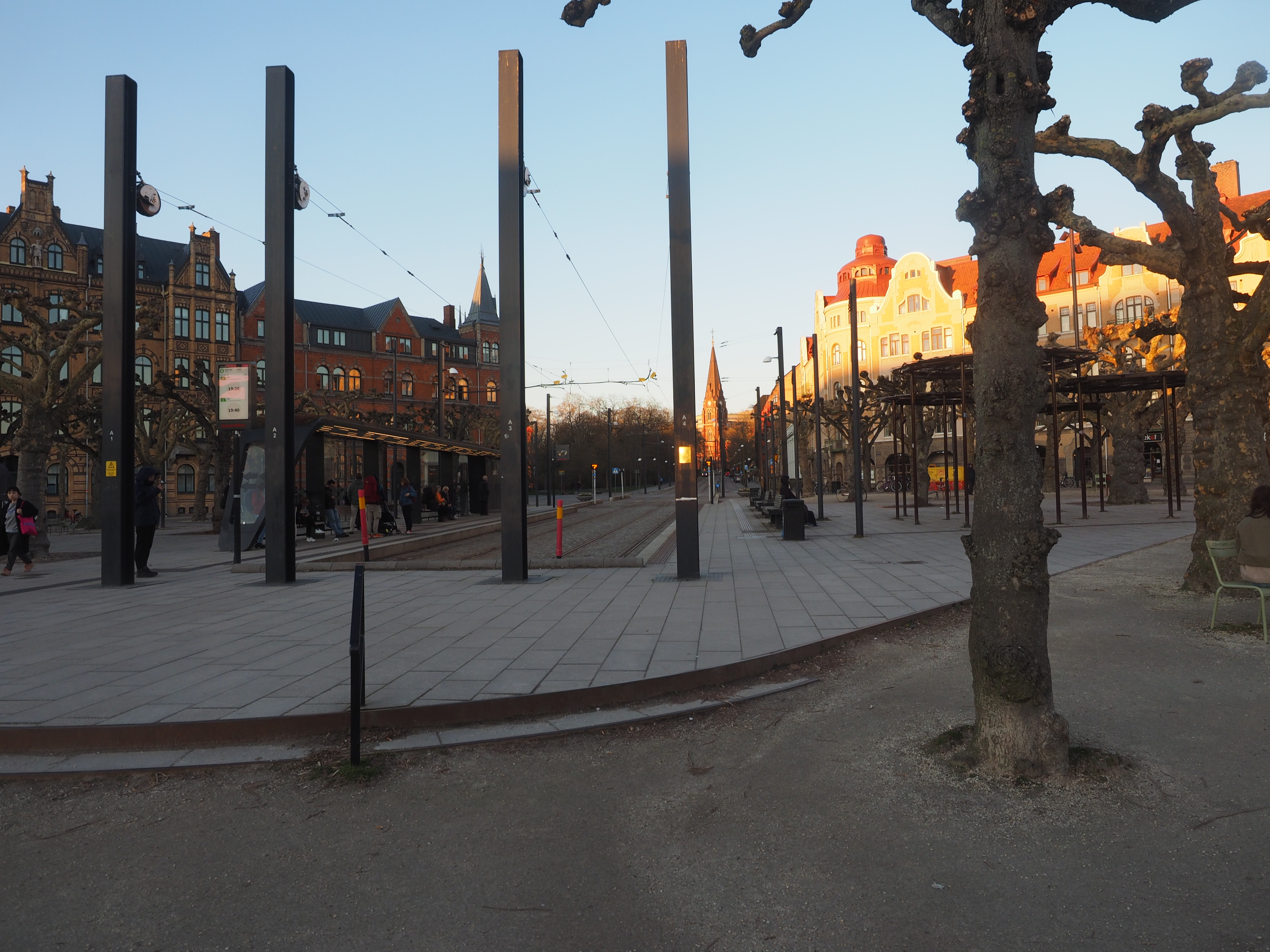
A view of the terminus stop of the Lund tramway at Clemenstorget

The Lund tramway (Swedish: Lunds spårväg), marketed as LundaExpressen, consists of a single double-track 5.5 km (3.4 mi) 9-stop tram line in Lund, Sweden.

The Lund tramway was inaugurated on 12 December 2020. It connects Lund Central Station with the hospital, Lund University (LTH), Ideon Science Park, the new upcoming district of Brunnshög, the MAX IV synchrotron light source, and the European Spallation Source with a 15-minute tram ride. It is the fourth modern city tramway in Sweden, after Stockholm and neighbouring municipalities, Gothenburg and Norrköping, and the first all-new tramway system in Sweden since 1911.

The Lund tramway is operated by Skånetrafiken, which also operates the city and regional buses and trains.

The first of the CAF-manufactured trams was delivered on 29 July 2020, and is named Åsa-Hanna, after the 1918 novel of the same name by Lund-born Elin Wägner. The tram line opened to the public on Lucia day, 13 December 2020. The project has been jointly funded in different parts by Lund municipality, Region Skåne, Skånetrafiken and the Swedish state, costing 1.5 billion SEK (approximately 148 million euro).

== History ==
There were plans in the late 19th and early 20th century to build a tramway in Lund, as many other Swedish cities did around the same time, but these never came to fruition.

Plans for the so-called "Lundalänken" system started in the late 1980s, and the modern incarnation of the tramway plans date to 2003, with the bus route Lundalänken operating through the Lund University Central Hospital area and the Faculty of Engineering at the Lund University being designed with the possibility of future conversion into a tramway in mind. The system consisted of the city bus lines 6 and 20 as well as the regional bus lines 166 and 169. Formal planning for construction of the tramway began in 2010.

The proposed tramway was a dominant issue in Lund's municipal politics during the 2010s, with political parties changing stances on the tramway throughout the period. The tram issue also led to the formation of a new local political party, with veteran Folkpartiet (Liberals) politician Sverker Oredsson among others forming Förnyalund (Renew Lund/For The New Lund) ahead of the 2014 elections.

Construction of the nearly 6-kilometre-long (3.7 mi) tram line, to achieve faster and higher-capacity public transport between Lund Central Station and many of the largest workplaces in the city, was formally approved in 2015.

In December 2015, a decision was made to construct a tramway between Lund Central Station and the European Spallation Source research centre. Construction started on 15 February 2017. The contract with Skanska was signed in May 2016.

The municipality of Lund invested a total of about 890 million krona in the tramway project. The state of Sweden financed the project with a further 373 million krona through two national investments to develop lasting cities and public transport. This was in addition to funding from the region: 297 million krona for the CAF Urbos trams and 270 million krona for the depot. The total cost of the entire project amounted to approximately 1,500 million krona. The municipality of Lund also receives income from construction and marketing rights along the tramway.

In 2018, the right-wing coalition in control of the municipal government announced that no expansion of trams would be planned for the rest of the 2018-2022 term.

The tram system opened on 13 December 2020. The opening was originally scheduled to occur on 12 December, with a celebratory inauguration event at which Johan Wester would be in attendance, but those plans were foiled by the COVID-19 pandemic. The inauguration was held digitally instead, with service commencing the next day.

=== Teething issues ===
After the introduction of the tram, issues soon emerged with the formation of flat spots on the wheels of the trams due to repeated rapid braking. This culminated in all trams being out of service on 1 February 2021, less than two months after service started. Due to the unexpected speed at which these issues emerged, no lathe for the wheels was available at the time, resulting in issues with keeping the service operating as intended. A lathe designed for the trams was brought into use in May 2021.

Disagreements with the manufacturer, CAF, over the issue with flat spots, along with other complaints, meant that Skånetrafiken did not take formal possession of all trams until July 2022. Tram services were set to run at 10-minute intervals during rush hour starting in August 2022. With the timetable change of December 2025, tram service was improved a 7.5-minute headway during rush hour.

== Structure ==
The Lund tramway is a conventional electric tramway with bi-directional trams. The track width is 1435 mm. The trams are powered by 750 volts direct current via overhead lines mounted 5.5 metres over the tracks. The Lund tramway is not equipped with railway-type signals and trams obey normal traffic signals at street intersections.

The trams operate mostly in an exclusive right-of-way, but they cross other traffic at intersections. The buses that previously used the street St Laurentiigatan were diverted permanently in December 2016 and now follow the streets Spolegatan and Kung Oskars väg instead. The buses that previously operated at Lundalänken were also rerouted.

The trams pass under the street Tornavägen and the European route E22. Most of the tracks of the trams are on grass. There are nine stops with platforms 35 metres long. The municipality of Lund is responsible for maintenance of the tramway infrastructure, whereas the trams and the depot are owned by the region of Skåne (Scania), with the depot being located to the east of the north-eastern terminus ESS.

In December 2018, a contract was signed for the use of the latter of two sections for a depot in Brunshög for servicing of the trams and infrastructure such as the signal system. The delay of the order of the depot construction, about a year after the trams, has meant that the tramway should be ready before construction is complete, and that the signal system that is to be placed there cannot be completed. In October 2019 there was an announcement that the complicated nature of the project has meant a further delay.

== Rolling stock ==
The Lund tramway operates seven 33-metre-long low-floor trams of the model Urbos 100. The trams were ordered by Skånetrafiken in May 2018 from the Spanish company Construcciones y Auxiliar de Ferrocarriles (CAF). The trams were built at the CAF factory in Zaragoza, Spain. Each tram has a capacity of 200 passengers with 40 seats. The contract specified ten years of maintenance. Each trams carries a name, similarly to the Pågatåg trains of Skånetrafiken. The names were chosen from a survey from Lund's citizens in 2019, in which citizens could propose names with a connection to the city. The first tram was named Åsa-Hanna, after Elin Wägner's 1917 novel. The other trams are named Sfinxen, Lindeman, Blåtand, Brandklipparen, Inferno and Saxo Grammaticus.

The first tram, Åsa-Hanna, was delivered to Lund on 29 July 2020. During the delivery, an older tram that was owned by the tramway museum in Malmköping was rented to be able to eventually assist Åsa-Hanna in service and at the depot. Åsa-Hanna was the first tram to undergo the first test route of the system on 17 August 2020. The last trams of the first contract were delivered in December 2020. At the start of the tram service, four trams had been delivered to lund: Åsa-Hanna, Sfinxen, Blåtand and Brandklipparen. Three of these trams were planned for use in passenger service on the opening day of 13 December 2020; the fourth tram was planned to be a reserve tram. As of December 2020, all seven trams were expected to be delivered and ready for service by 1 February 2021. This did not come to fruition, and by summer 2022, only four of the trams ordered by Skånetrafiken had been placed in service. Shortly after the change in schedule in August 2022 the remaining trams were ready for service, with the exception of Blåtand, which had been damaged in an accident on Midsummer eve in the same year.

In autumn 2025, the tram Sfinxen returned to service after a minor modification. This modification included the addition of new stop-request buttons for the impaired on priority seats at each end of the tram. The idea is to have all the other trams also receive such a retrofit, as a higher level of traffic security will be required when the headway of 7.5 minutes is introduced. This denser traffic also requires five of the seven trams to be in service simultaneously, in contrast to four at the present headway of 10 minutes.

== Formation ==
The Lund tramway is part of Skånetrafiken's city express concept called "Lundaexpressen". This concept as a whole is similar in design of the trams and their interiors to the Malmöexpressen and Helsingborgsexpressen.

The trams in Lund are equipped with more standing places than normal seats. The motivation for this is to ease traffic on the tramway so passengers stay on the tram for shorter distances, and also that the tram line passes by the Skåne University Hospital. Accessible seats and functions on the trams are marked with an orange colour whiule the rest of the interior of the tram is based on black and gray nuances.

Nine tram stops on the tram line are protected against the weather and are heated with radiation in wintertime. These stops have real-time displays of the tram traffic.

== Tram lines ==
The Lund tramway has one line, with the line number 1. The trip from Lund C to ESS takes about 15 minutes. Since 20 August 2023 the tram service has been operated by Keolis. The drivers alternate between driving buses and driving trams. The service was previously operated by Vy Buss.

The tram schedule is at its shortest intervals of 7.5 minutes at peak times on weekdays, at 15 minutes in normal traffic and at 20 minutes in times of lower traffic. On Saturdays the scheduled interval is 15 minutes for the most of the day. On Sundays the interval is 20 minutes for the whole day.

Line	Route	Length (km)	Interval (trams per hour)
1	Lund Central Station – ESS	5.5	8-3

== Stops ==
- Lund C
- Lund University Central Hospital
- LTH
- Ideon Science Park
- Telefonplan
- Solbjer
- Brunnshögtorget
- MAX IV Laboratory
- ESS

== Criticism ==
During the proposal and planning stage the project was met with criticism and protests among the citizens of Lund. Support by the different political parties was far from unanimous, with the Moderate Party, Förnyalund, the Christian Democrats, the Feminist Initiative, the Centre Party and the Sweden Democrats being opposed to the tramway. During the implementation phase the project exceeded its budget numerous times, and the construction ended up costing about 130 million krona more than what was originally planned. The total sum ended up at about 900 million krona, compared to the 867 million that had originally been budgeted for the construction. In addition to this, the Skåne (Scania) region had to pay about 570 million krona for the trams themselves and for the new depot.

== Future expansion ==
Since the beginning of the project, there have been plans to extend the system with a new line to neighbouring Staffanstorp as well as Dalby, Linero and Södra Sandby or to new developments to the North and East of the current endpoint at the European Spallation Source, and to Staffanstorp via Tetra Pak through the centre of Lund, as well as to the west towards the municipalities of Lomma and Bjärred. No decision for future expansion was made in the overall plan in 2018.

The main boulevard of the planned area Västerbro is also being developed to have the ability to support light rail tracks in the future.

== Gallery ==
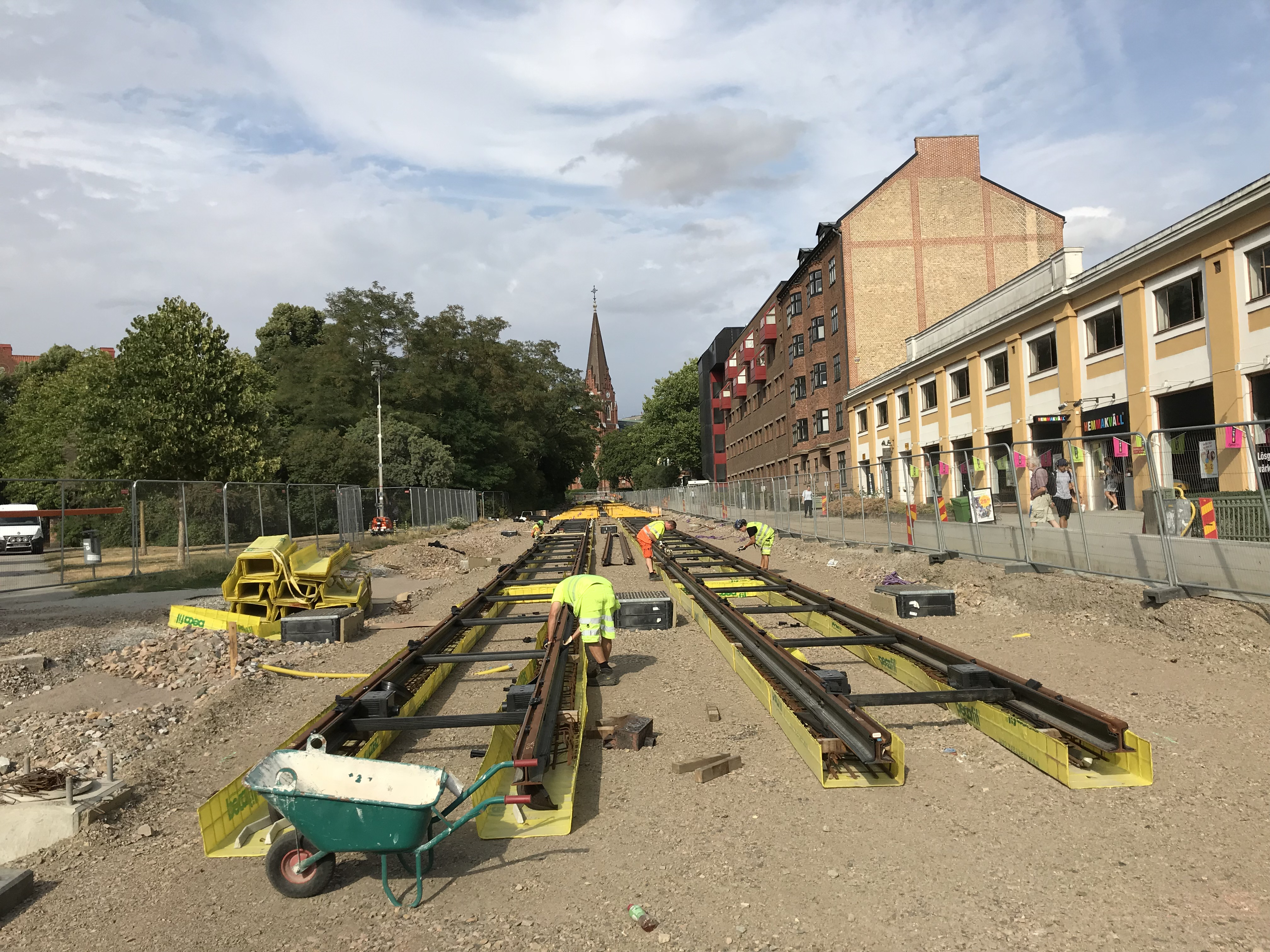
Tram track construction on the street Sankt Laurentigatan between Clemenstorget and the All Saints Church in August 2018.

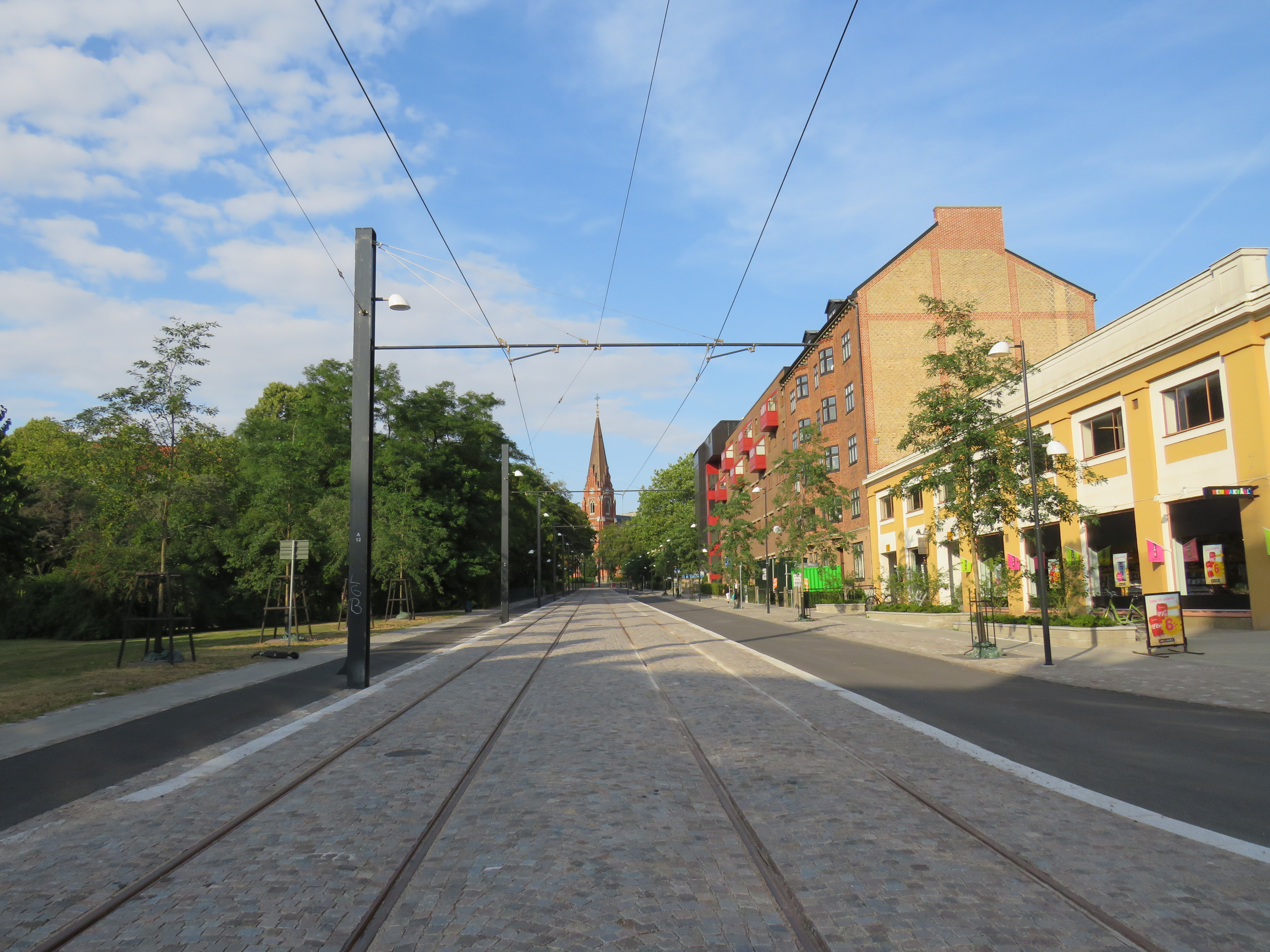
The same track after one year.

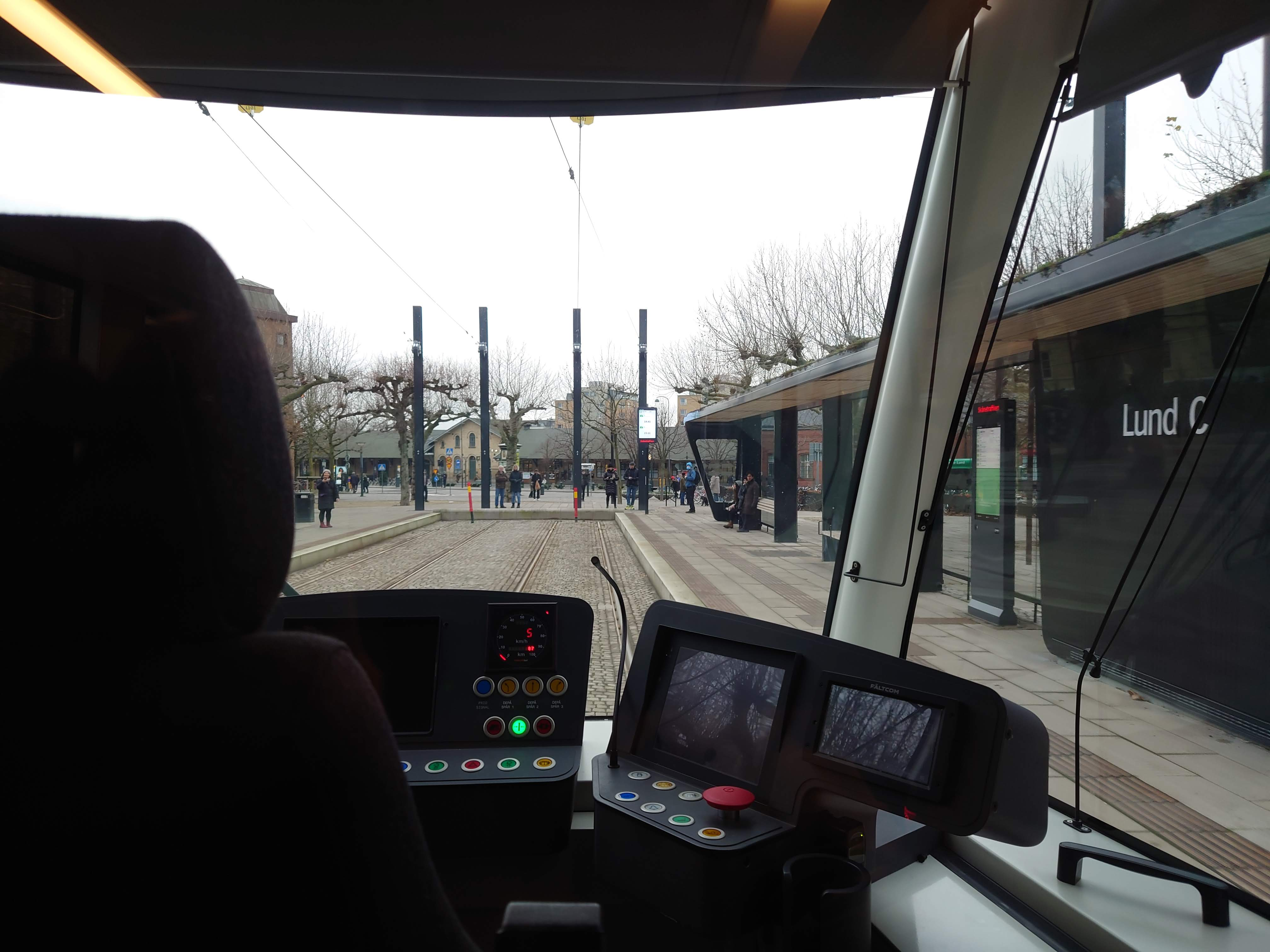
A view from the driver's cabin towards the Lund C tram stop.

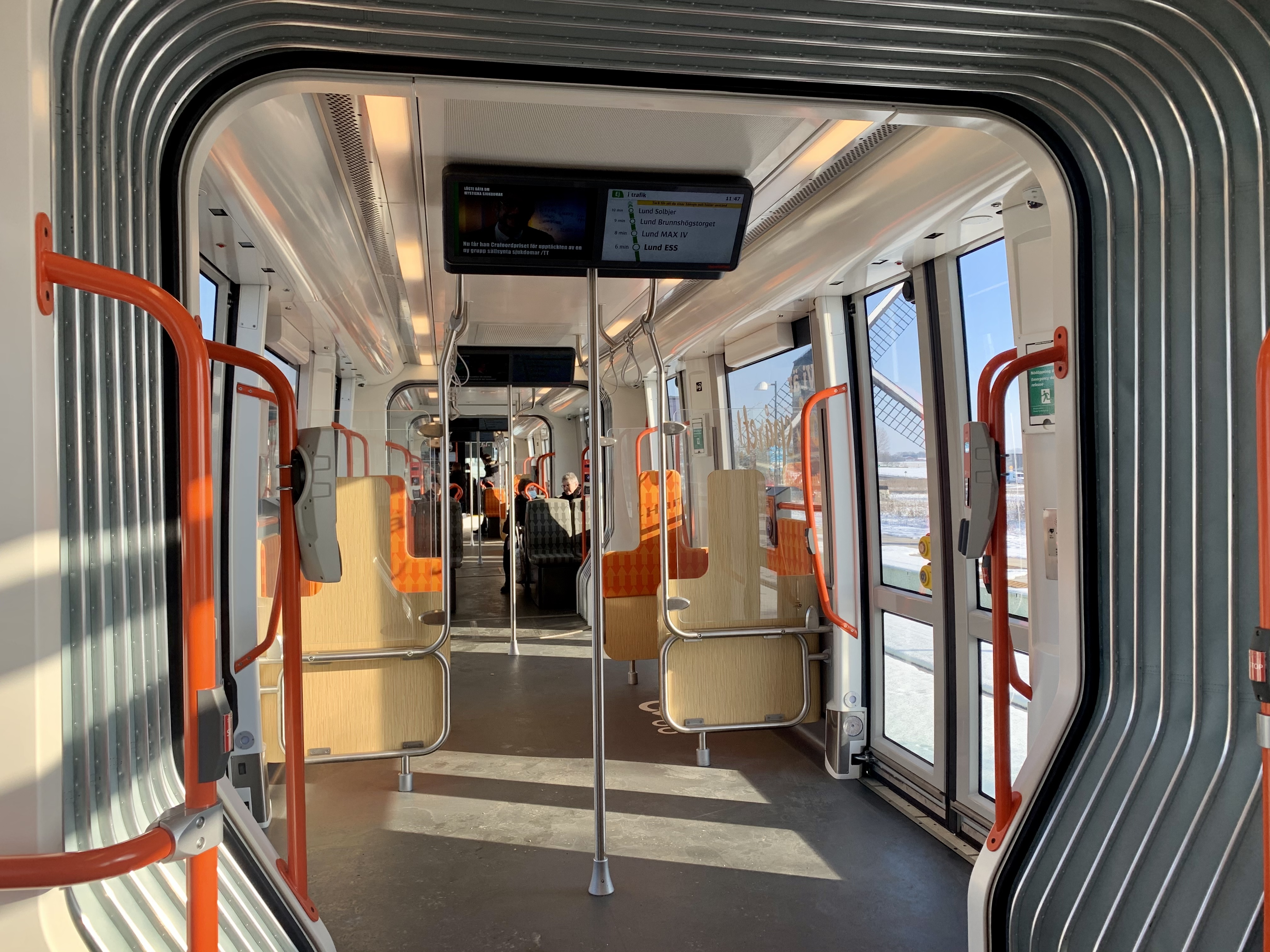
Interior of a tram.

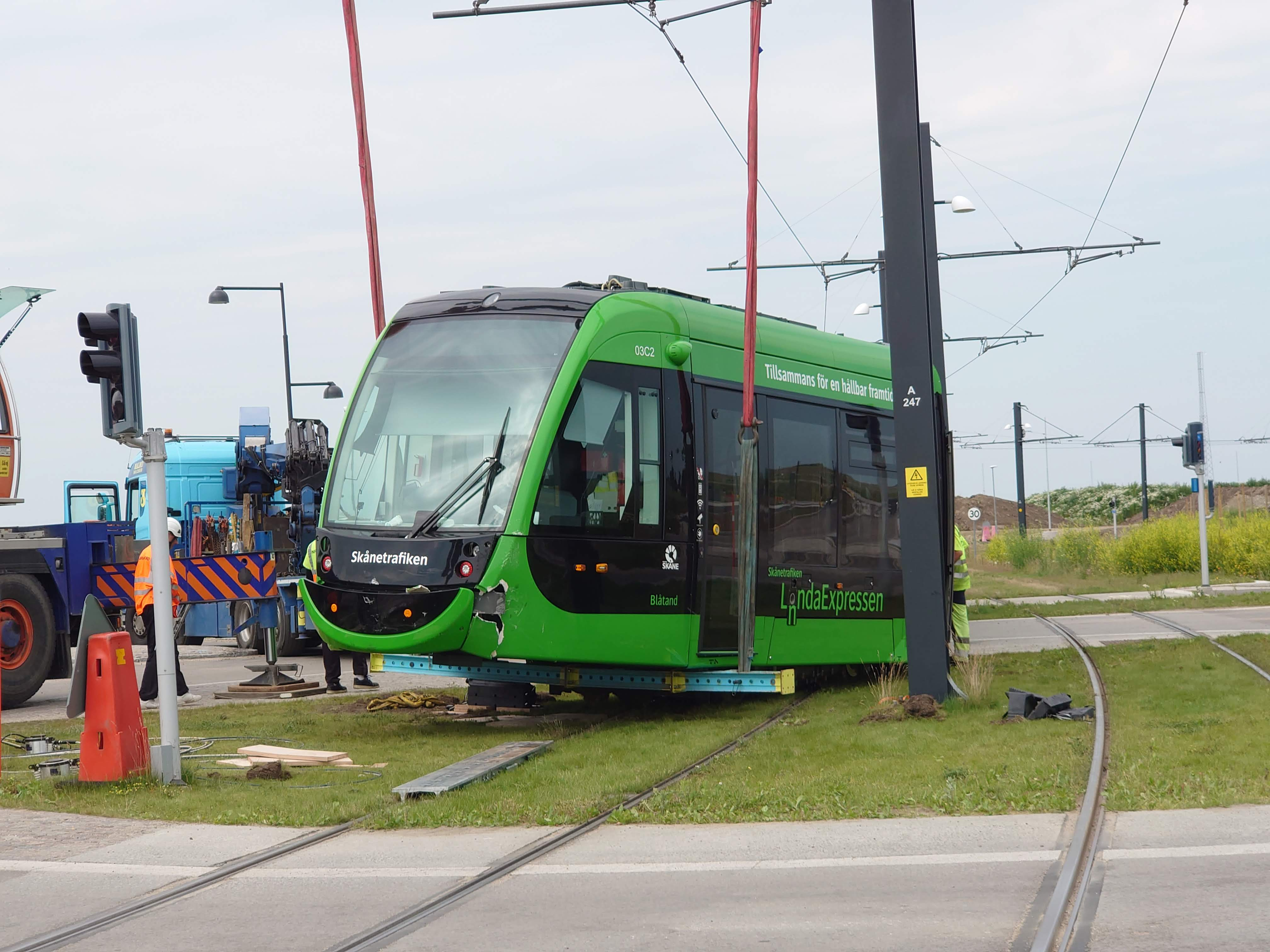
"Blåtand" is lifted back on the tracks after a collision on Midsummer Day 2022.

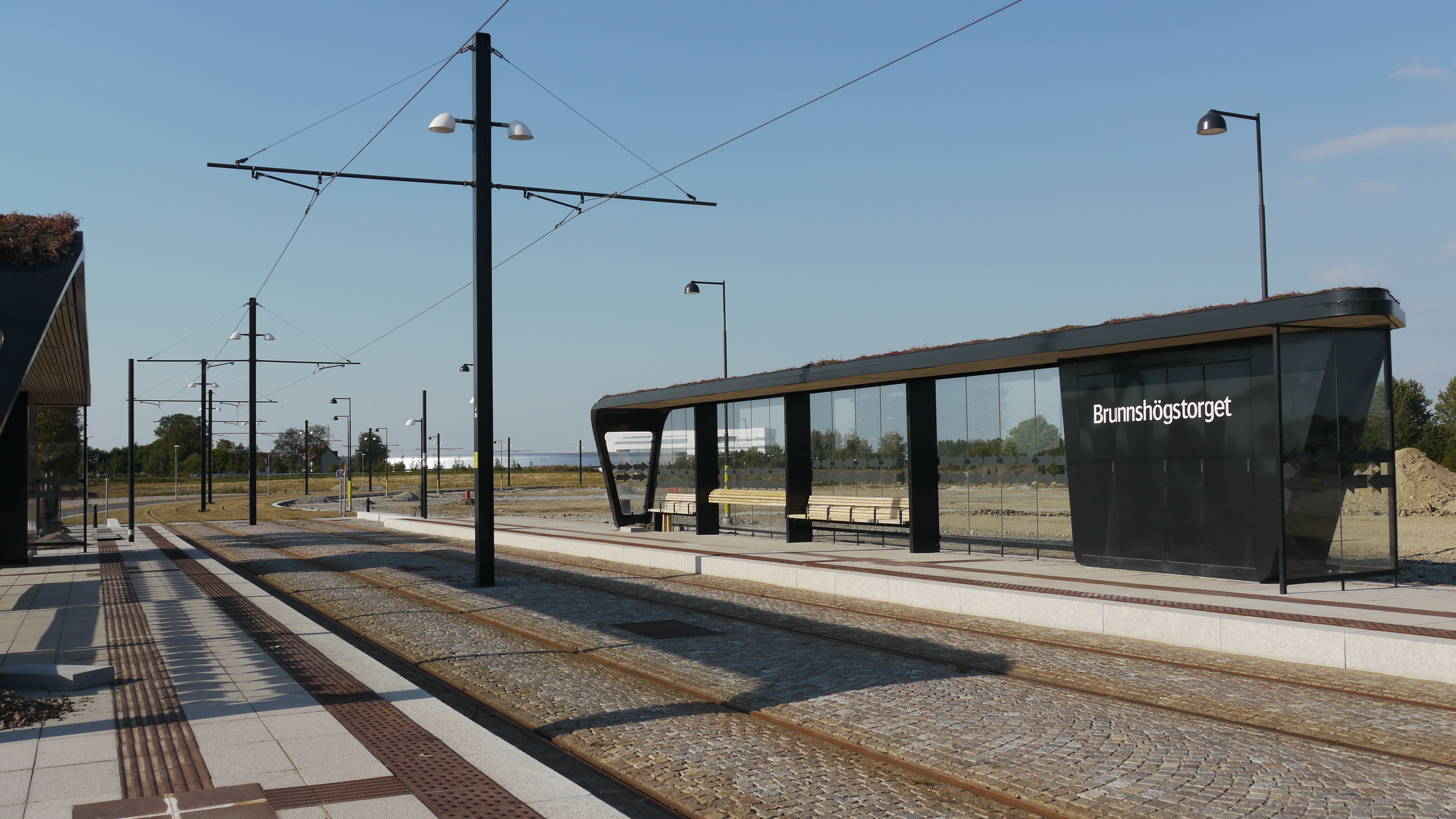
The tram stop Brunnhöstorget.

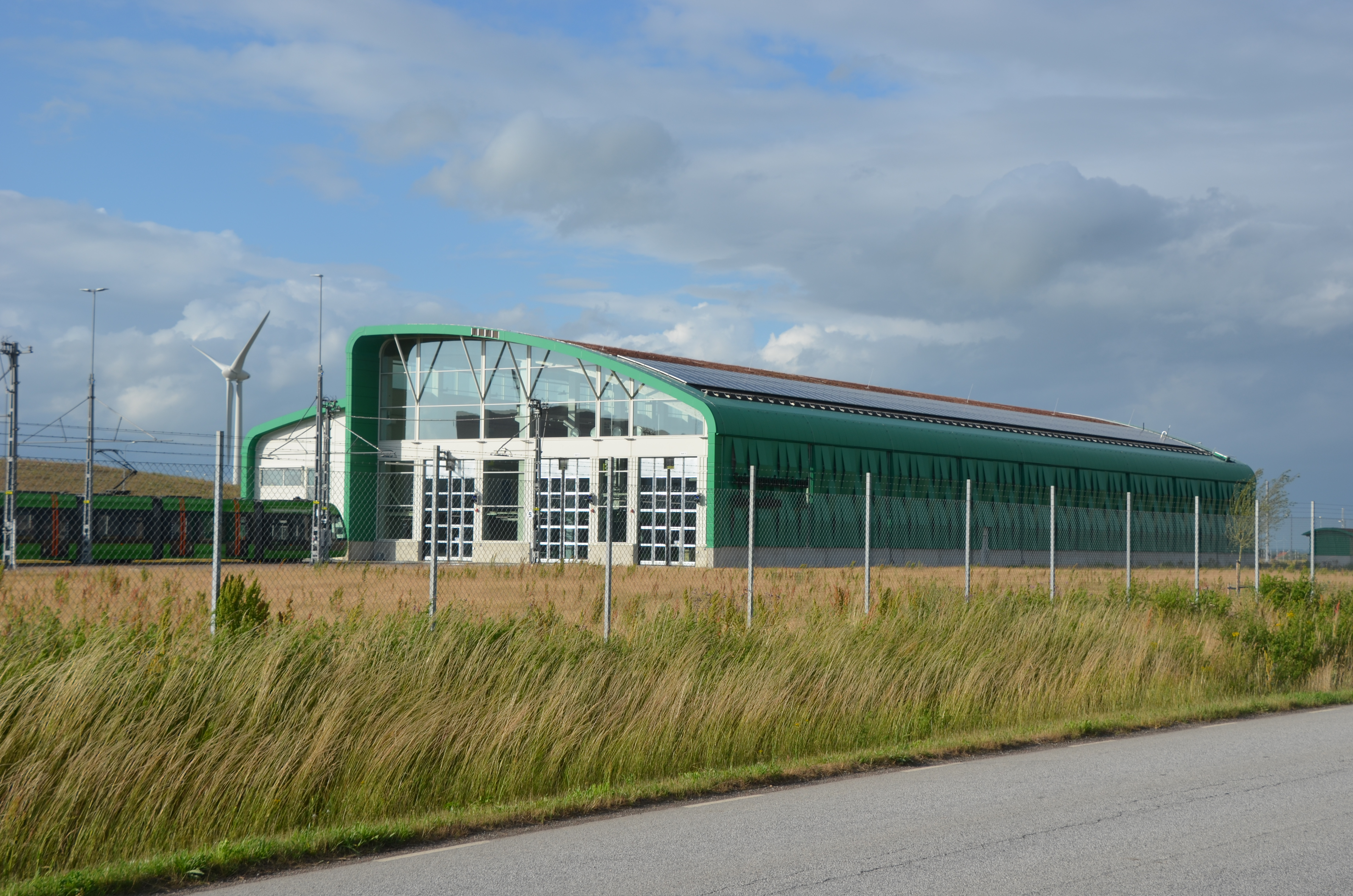
The tram depot.
