= Vomb Church =

- Vombs kyrka
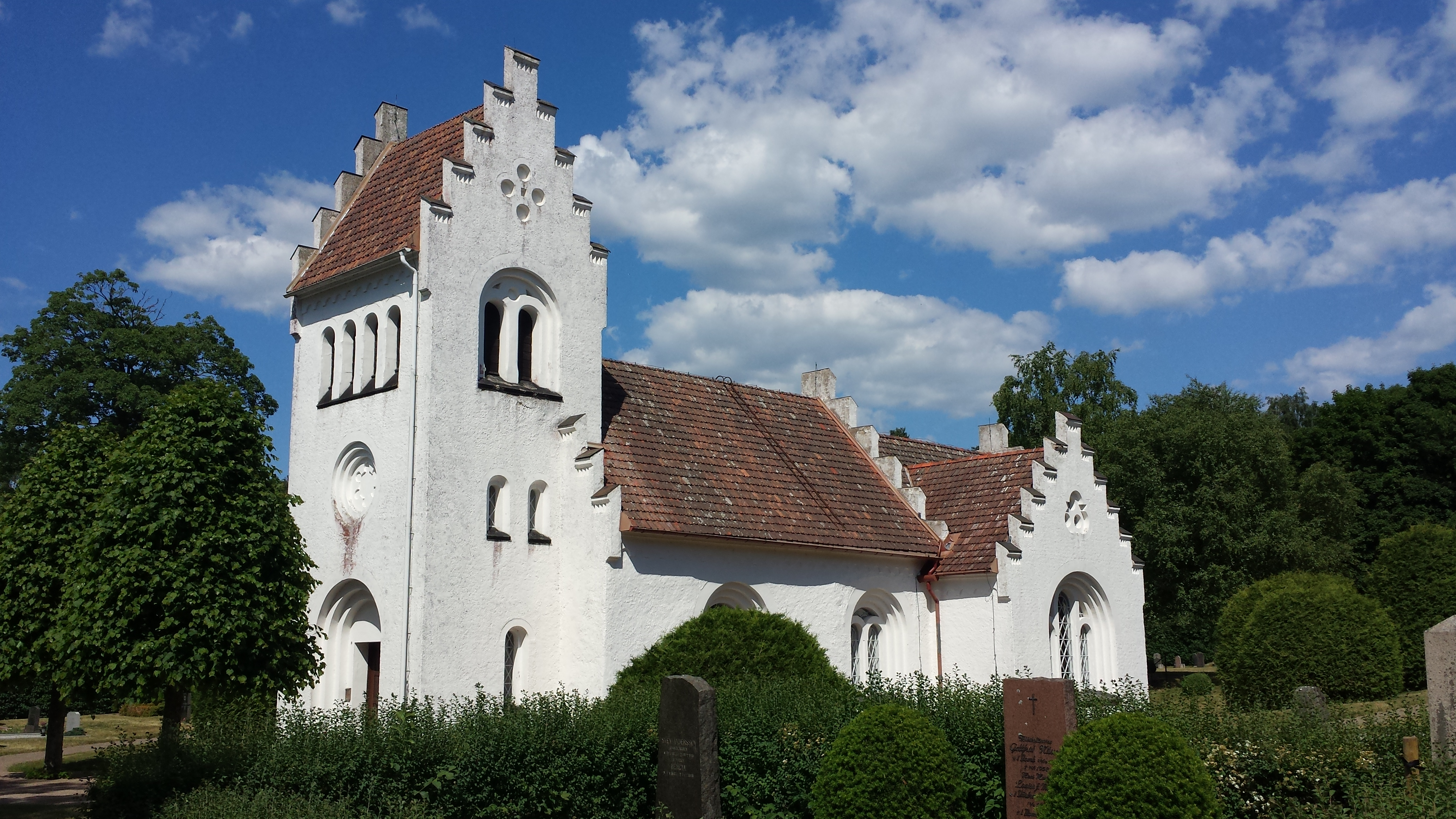
- Vomb Church

- 55°40′22″N 13°22′09″E
- Country: Sweden
- Denomination: Church of Sweden

Vomb Church (Swedish: Vombs kyrka) is a medieval church in Vomb, Lund Municipality in the province of Skåne, Sweden.

== History ==
The church dates from the middle of the 13th century. The first church consisted of a nave, chancel and apse. The vaults were built in the 15th century, replacing an earlier wooden ceiling. The church was heavily altered in 1870–1871, when architect Helgo Zettervall redesigned it in a Romanesque Revival style, adding the presently visible tower, transepts, new windows and a new apse. In 1986, remains of medieval murals were uncovered underneath layers of whitewash in the nave. They depict the Passion of Christ and the fall of man. Older, even more fragmentary remains of murals have also been discovered on the walls of the nave.

== Furnishings ==
The altarpiece of the church is from the late 16th century. It depicts the Last Supper and carries the monogram of Danish King Christian IV (At the time, Skåne was part of Denmark). The pulpit is from the same time period, and is one of the oldest preserved in the province of Skåne. The baptismal font is from the 13th century.
