= Clemenstorget =

Public square in Lund, Sweden

Coordinates: 55°42′25.9″N 13°11′18.3″E

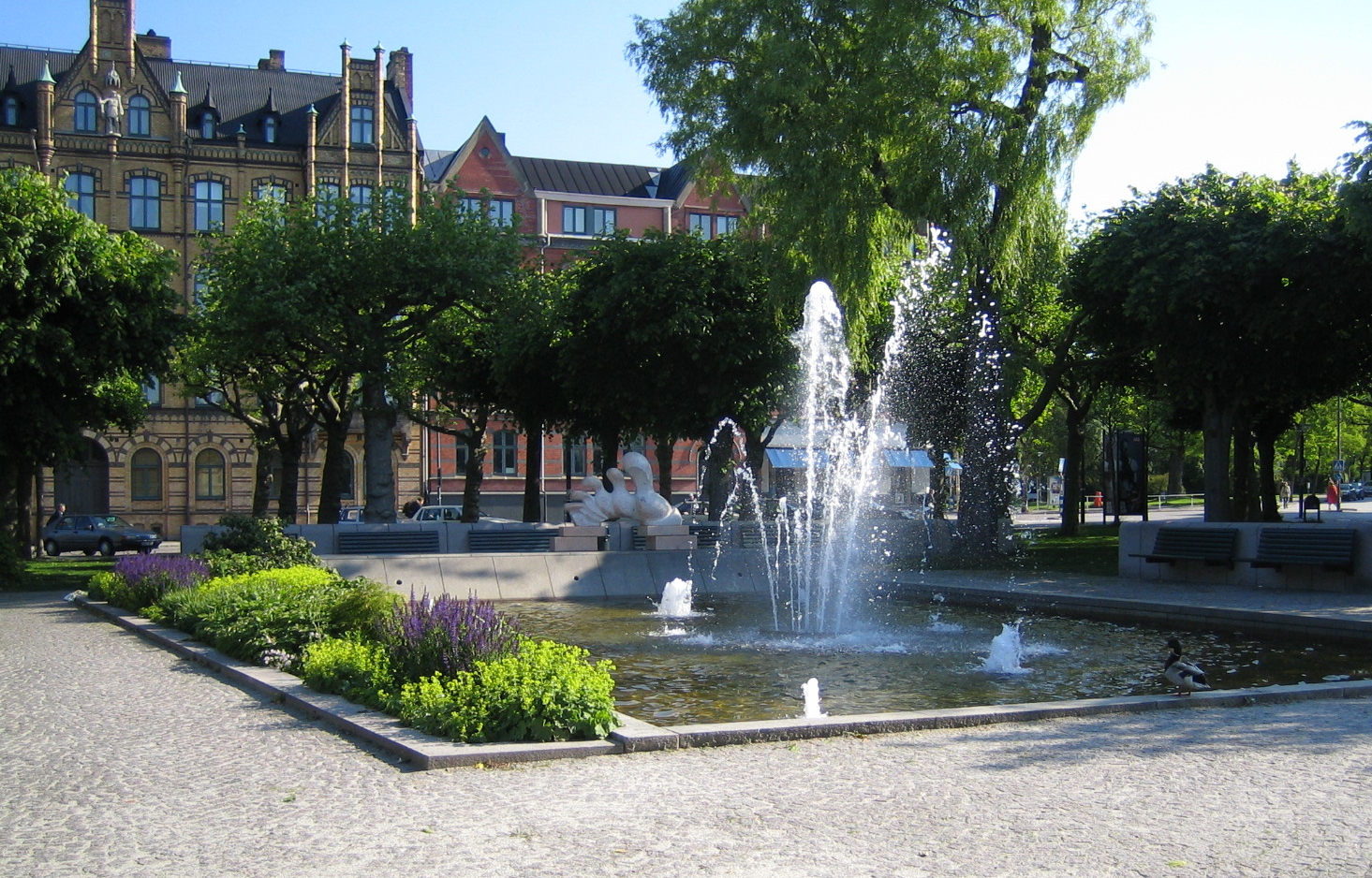
The fountain pool at the centre of Clemenstorget. There are Platanus trees around the fountain pool.

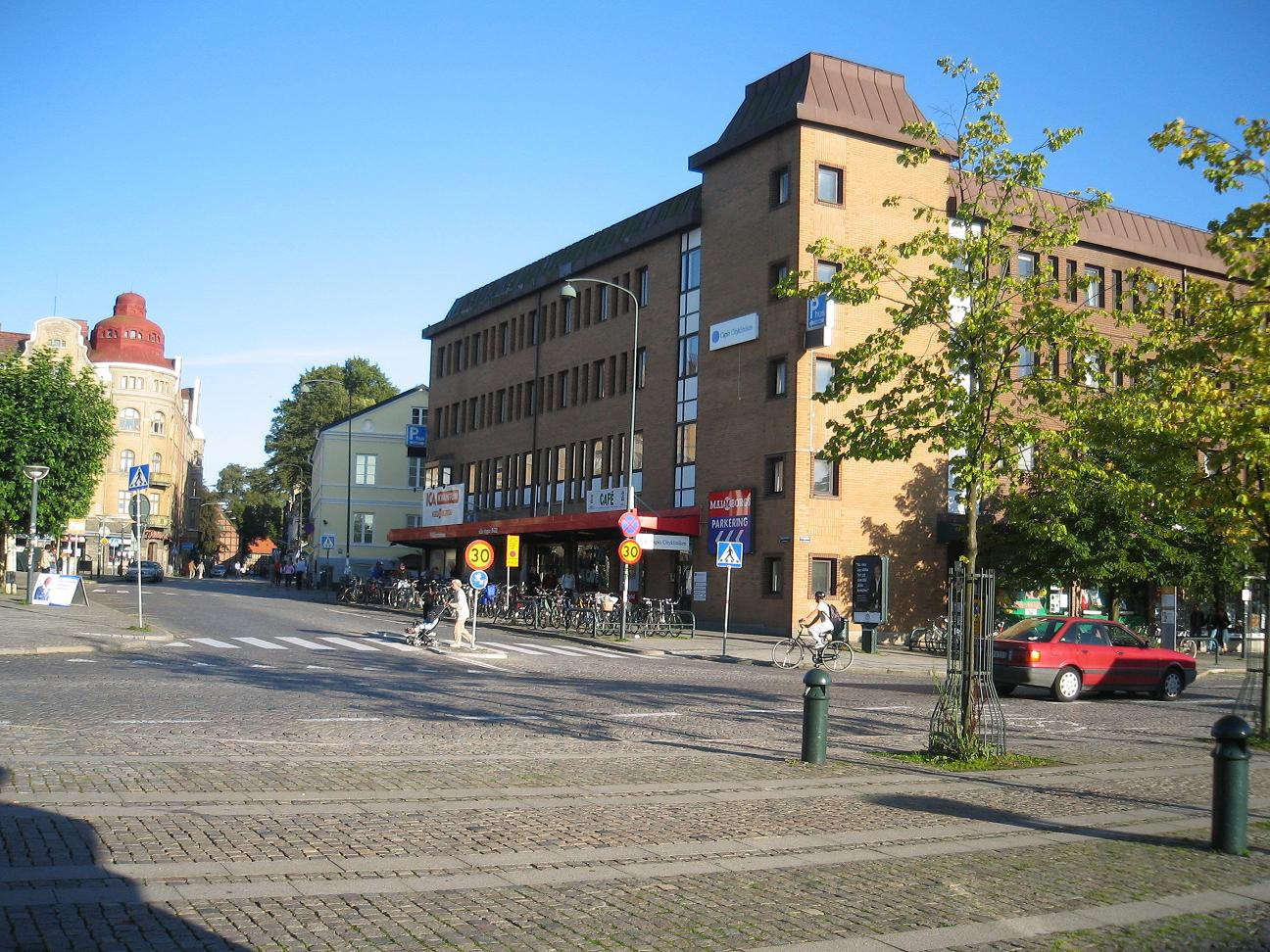
The south side of Clemenstorget. To the left of Malmborgs is the so-called Broméska hus built in 1858. Where Malmborgs now stands was an Art Nouveau building from 1900 to 1974.

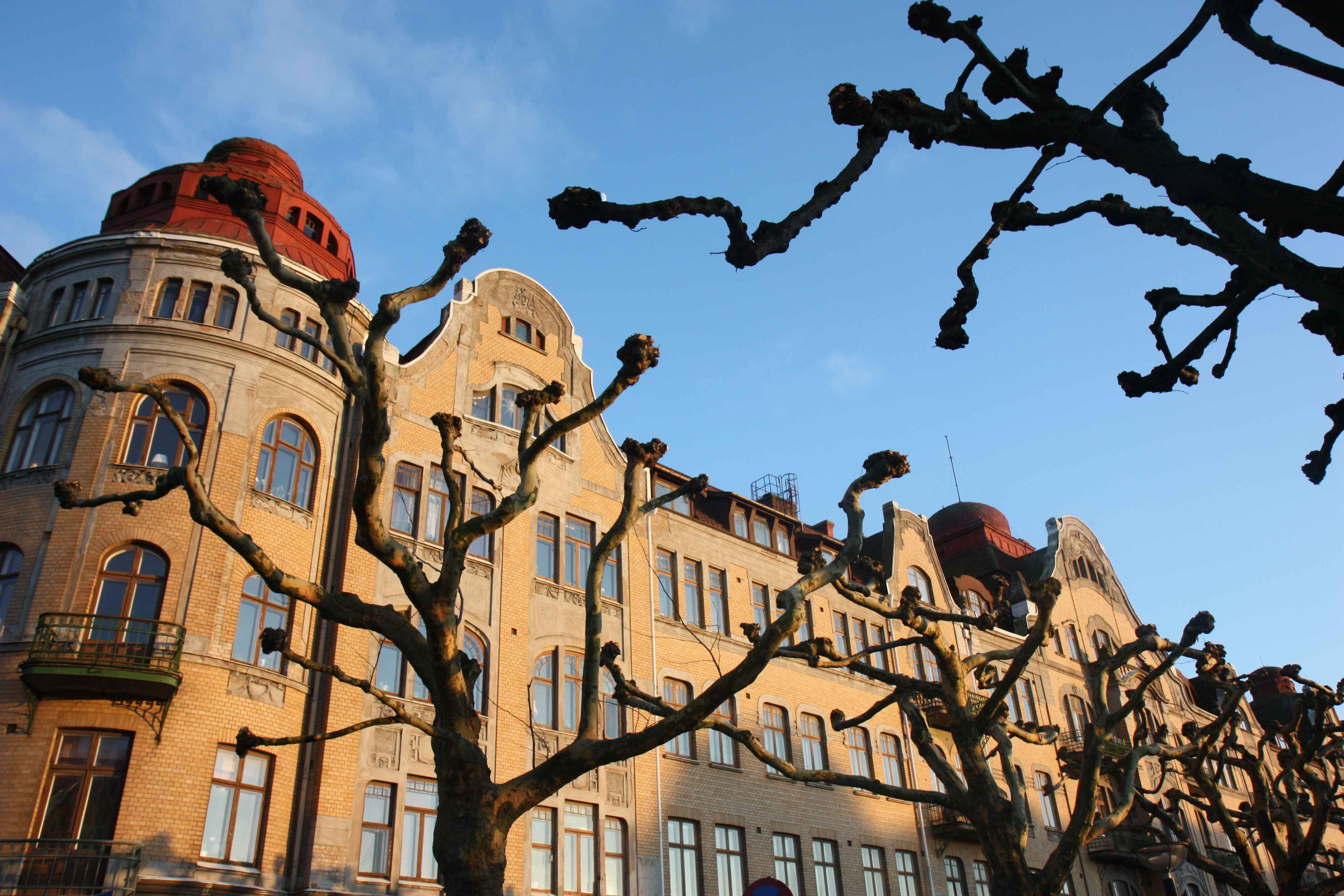
Art Nouveau buildings near Clemenstorget in 2012.

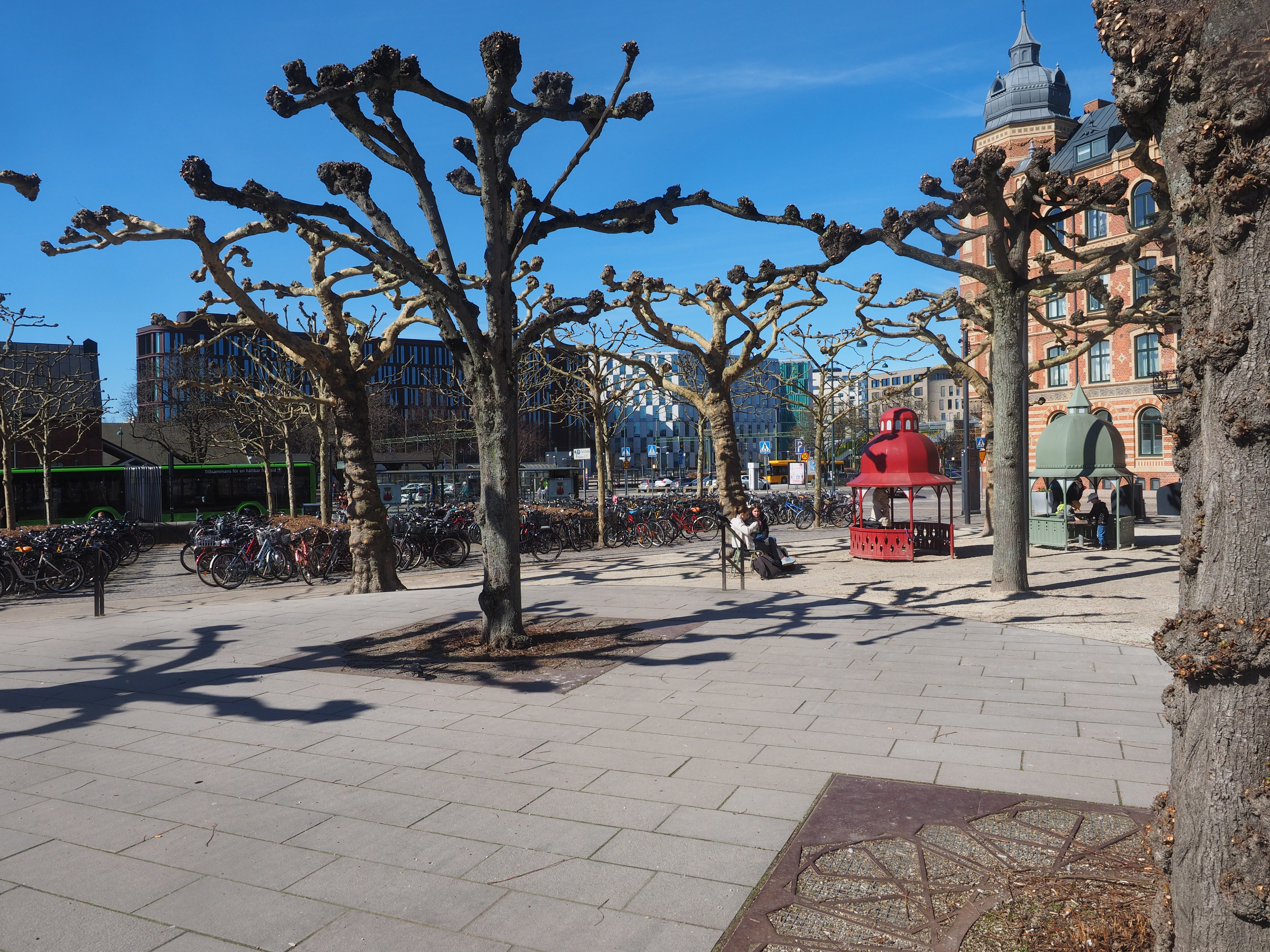
Clemenstoget in April 2025.

Clemenstorget is a public square in Lund, Sweden. It is located about 100 metres (300 ft) to the northeast of Lund Central Station and is one of the largest squares in the city. Clemenstorget is known for its market activity, most of all flea markets.

== History ==
The square was founded in the 1890s and was originally called Clementstorget (the name was changed in 1923). Several houses were built around the square, including imposing stone houses on the north and east sides of the square. On the west side of the square is the customs house, now used for auctions, and there has been a pedestrian bridge over the railway station since 1997.

The municipality of Lund planned a rectangular zoning plan to the east of the square in the late 19th century, which was never carried out. Instead the Spoletorp area was built to the north of the square, which is an example of a well-preserved lush stone house block from the early 20th century. The stone houses planned to the northeast opposite the All Saints Church were never built, instead the Lindeberg school and the Ribbing sanatorium were built in a lush and respected park milieu- Decades later, there was discussion about a "renovation plan" for the square, the outcome of which was that all houses in the area, except for one Art Nouveau building on the south side of the square from 1900 were preserved. A supermarket and office building was constructed in 1975-77, with a car park underneath, and this building now significantly dominates the south side.

All sides of the square, except for the east side, have later received frequent traffic from the city and regional buses, as the Lund Central Station is located right next to the square.

On 5 April 2003 the sculpture Eos, den rosenfingrade by Staffan Niblén was built near the pool in the middle of the square. The sculpture was later removed in June 2017 because the square was being renovated for the Lund tramway. In spring 2017 eight trees were moved to Brunnshög to make way for the tram line. The sculpture Eos was moved back to the square, at a new place, on 4 December 2020.

The central terminus of the Lund tramway, called Lund C, is located diagonally across the square.

== Sources ==
- Clemenstorget at the website of the municipality of Lund
