= Södra Sandby Church =

Coordinates: 55°43′18″N 13°20′28″E

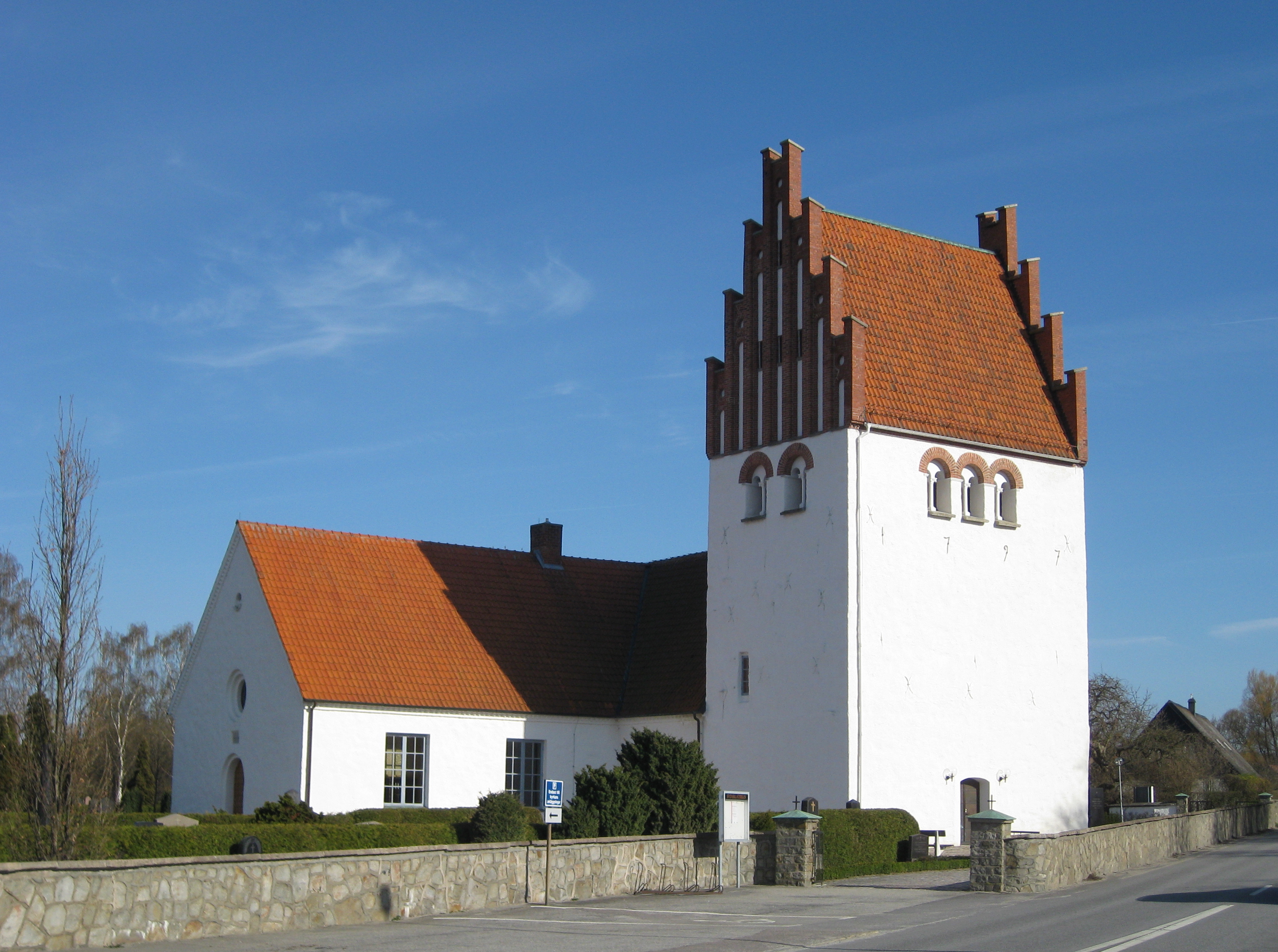
Södra Sandby Church, view of the exterior

Södra Sandby Church (Swedish: Södra Sandby kyrka) is a medieval Lutheran church in Södra Sandby in the province of Scania, Sweden. It belongs to the Diocese of Lund.

== History and architecture ==
The oldest parts of the church date from the late 12th or early 13th century. The tower was added in 1797 and rebuilt into its present form in 1911. The north transept was built in 1847 and the choir rebuilt in 1911. The baptismal font is the oldest item in the church; it dates from the late 12th century. The altarpiece dates from the early 17th century and is Renaissance in style. The facade of the organ screen dates from the 1870s and was designed by Helgo Zettervall.
