= Oscar Fredrik Church =

Cathedral in Gothenburg, Sweden

Coordinates: 57°41′48″N 11°56′50″E

- Oscar Fredriks kyrka
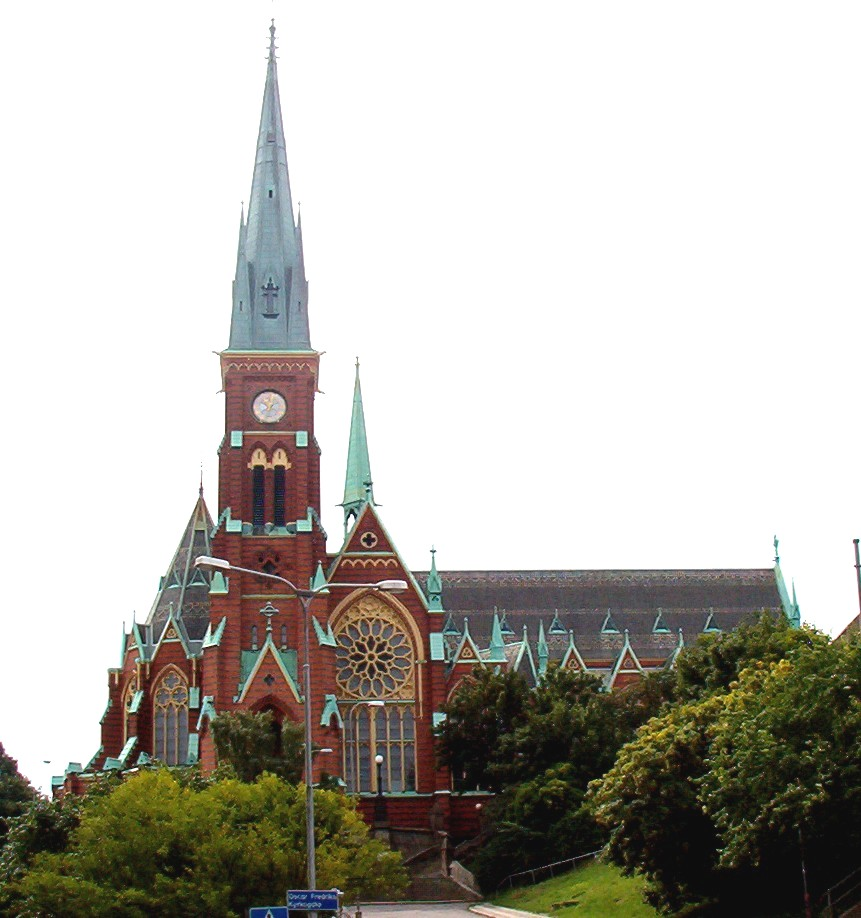
- Oscar Fredrik Church in August 2005
- Oscar Fredrik Church
- Location: Oscar Fredriks kyrkogata, off Vegastan, District of Olivedal
- Country: Sweden
- Denomination: Church of Sweden

History
- Consecrated: 2 April 1893

Architecture
- Architect: Helgo Zetterwall

Administration
- Diocese: Gothenburg
- Parish: Oscar Fredrik

Oscar Fredrik Church (Swedish: Oscar Fredriks kyrka) is a church in Olivedal in Gothenburg, Sweden. It was drawn by Helgo Zetterwall and erected in the 1890s. Belonging to the Gothenburg Oscar Fredrik Parish of the Church of Sweden (Swedish: Svenska Kyrkan), it was inaugurated on Easter Sunday, Sunday, 2 April 1893.

The church is built on Dahlin's mountain, after the merchant Samuel Dahlin who had a shipping company and several boardyards in the area where the First Long Street today is drawn up.

The church and the parish got its name from king Oscar II (Oscar Fredrik being his full name). He visited the church in 1898 and then wrote his name in its guestbook.

The style is Neo Gothic, but the influence is not the Nordic gothic style but rather the style one can find in the large cathedrals in continental Europe. The spire at 70 metres (230 ft) makes its Gothenburg's tallest church building.

The interior is uniform in lush greenish colours. Originally, the church had 1 685 seats. A large organ stands at one end.

The church has since been restored four times: 1915, 1940, 1974, and 2020. During the last renovation in 2020, the slate roof was replaced, the interior was cleaned and the walls were re-cleaned.
