= Förnyalund =

Local political party in Lund, Sweden

- Chairperson: Börje Hed
- Founded: January 2014
- Ideology: Localism; Tramway opposition
- Municipal council: 4 / 65

Website
- fornyalund.se

Förnyalund (FNL), written by the party as FörNyaLund, is a local political party in Lund, Sweden. The party was formed in January 2014 by opponents of the tramway being planned in Lund at the time. FNL was part of the governing coalition in the municipal council of Lund in the 2018-2022 term.

== Policy ==
Förnyalund has mainly profiled itself in urban planning and cultural environment issues and also works against the use of arable land for development. FNL has also been prominent in issues surrounding development in Lunds town centre. The party has expressed opposition against a proposed conference centre near the old court house and St. Peter's Priory.

== 2018-2022 term ==
The party received 6.37% of the votes in the 2014 municipal election and 8.57% in the 2018 municipal election; it advancing from four to six mandates. In the 2018-2022 term FNL, was a part of the governing coalition, the so-called Lund Quintet, in the municipal council of Lund. The party held the chairmanship of the Technical Committee (Tekniska nämnden) and the Culture and Recreation Committee (Kultur och fritidsnämnden), as well as the vice-chairmanship of the Construction Committee (Byggnadsnämnden).

== History of the party ==
Börje Hed, doctor of technology, became FörNyaLund's first municipal commissioner (kommunalråd). Jan Annerstedt, professor of sustainable economy, took over after Börje Hed in 2020. The party's first chair was history professor and former Folkpartiet politician Sverker Oredsson. He was succeeded in 2015 by Anne Landin, professor of construction sciences at the Faculty of Engineering at LTH, Lund University. Landin was succeeded by Maria Nermark, psychologist and chairperson of Region Skånes Psychologist Association. Ann Tångmark, architect SAR, became the new chairperson of the party in 2019 and is today vice-chairperson. Ann Tångmark was succeeded as chair by Börje Hed in 2020.

== Electoral results ==
Election	Votes	%	Seats	+/-	Government
2014	4,834	6.37 (#7)	4 / 65	▲4	Opposition
2018	6,870	8.57 (#7)	6 / 65	▲2	Coalition
2022	5,249	6.38 (#7)	4 / 65	▼2	Opposition
