= Folke Zettervall =

Swedish architect (1862–1955)

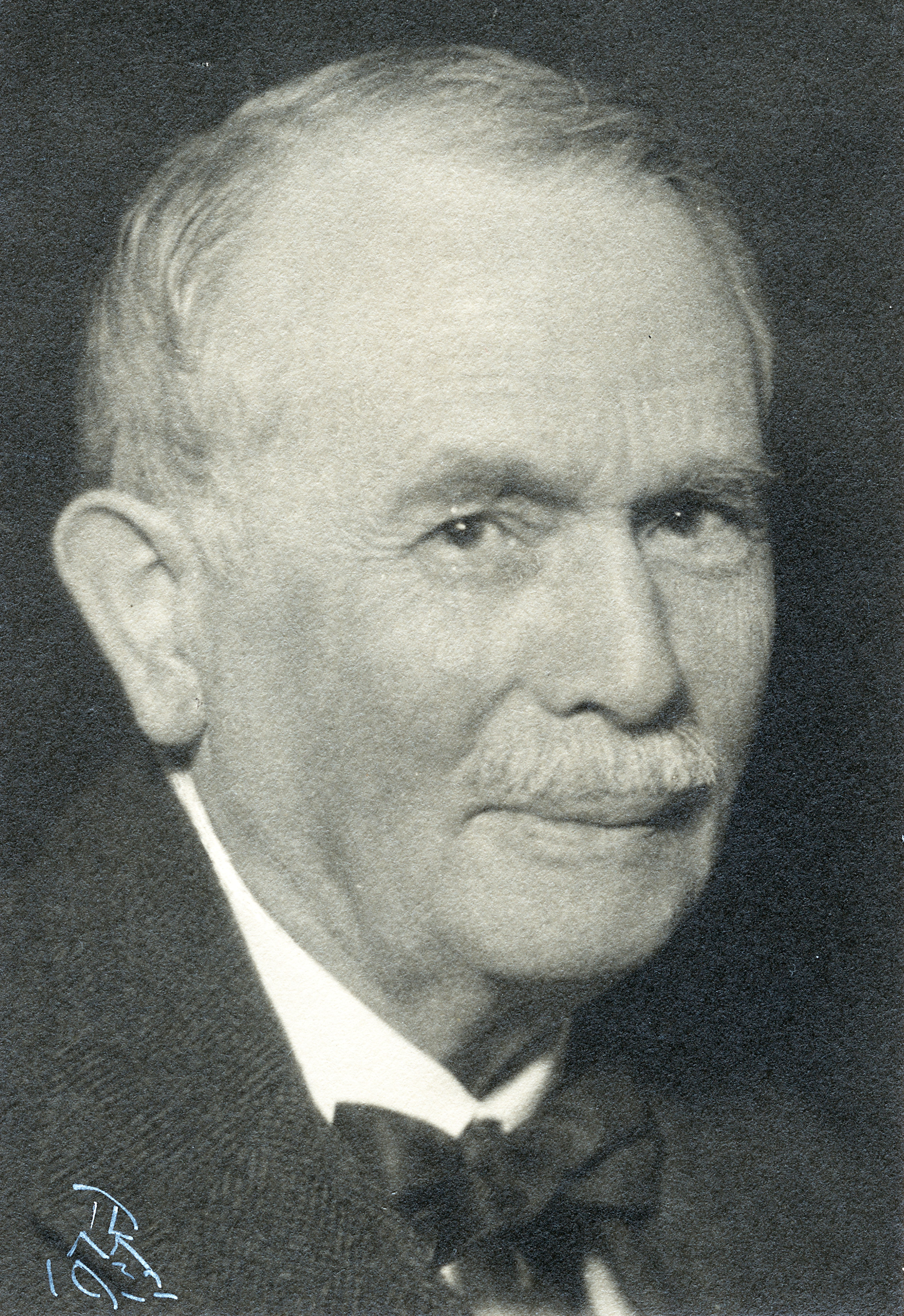
- Folke Zettervall
- Born: 21 October 1862; Lund
- Died: 12 March 1955 (aged 92)
- Father: Helgo Zettervall (1831–1907)

Signature
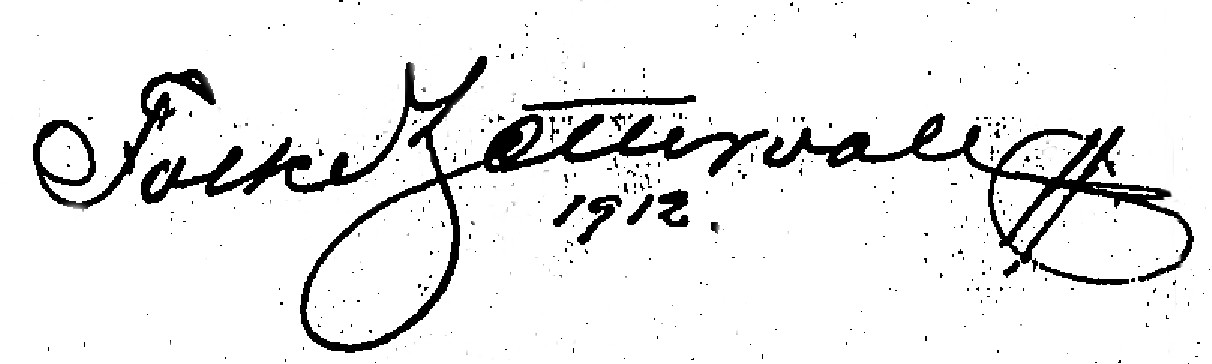

Folke Zettervall (21 October 1862 – 12 March 1955) was a Swedish architect and head architect with the Swedish State Railways (Statens Järnvägar) between 1895 and 1930.

== Biography ==
Zettervall was born at Lund, Sweden. He was the son of architect Helgo Zettervall (1831–1907). He started his studies at Katedralskolan (Högre Allmänna Läroverket) in Uppsala and continued in Copenhagen at Copenhagen Technical College (Københavns Tekniske Skole). He continued his education in architecture at the Royal Danish Academy of Fine Arts (Kunst-Akademiets Arkitekturskole) from 1885 to 1888.

After graduation, Zettervall was licensed as an architect and first worked for his father who was chief of Board superintendent for the administration of state buildings (Överintendentsämbetet). In 1890 he was recruited by Adolf W. Edelsvärd (1824–1919) to work on the architectural office of the Swedish national railway system, Statens Järnvägar. When Edelsvärd retired in 1895, Zettervall first became acting architect and in 1898 he became the National Railroad's chief architect until 1931.

During his career, Hann Zettervall draw about 260 station houses which were built throughout Sweden. In addition, he had a number of other commissions including drawing the plans for Suntak Church (Suntaks kyrka) at Tidaholm, the former courthouse at Krylbo (Krylbo tingshus) and the county hall at Sollefteå (Sollefteå tingshus).

== Style ==
Zettervall was influenced by the Richardson style when he designed several railway stations in Sweden during the 1800s.

== Gallery ==
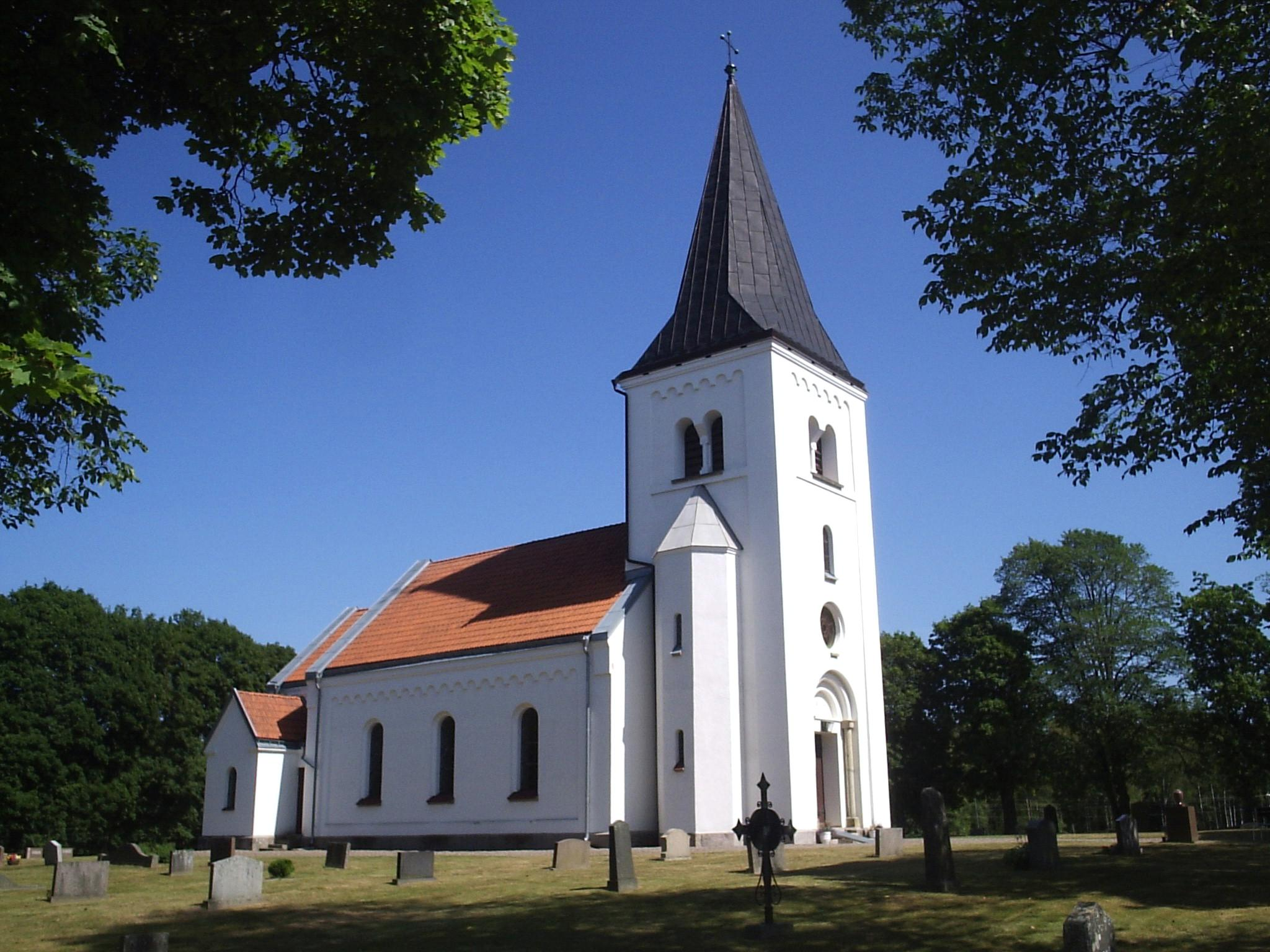
Suntak Church (1902)

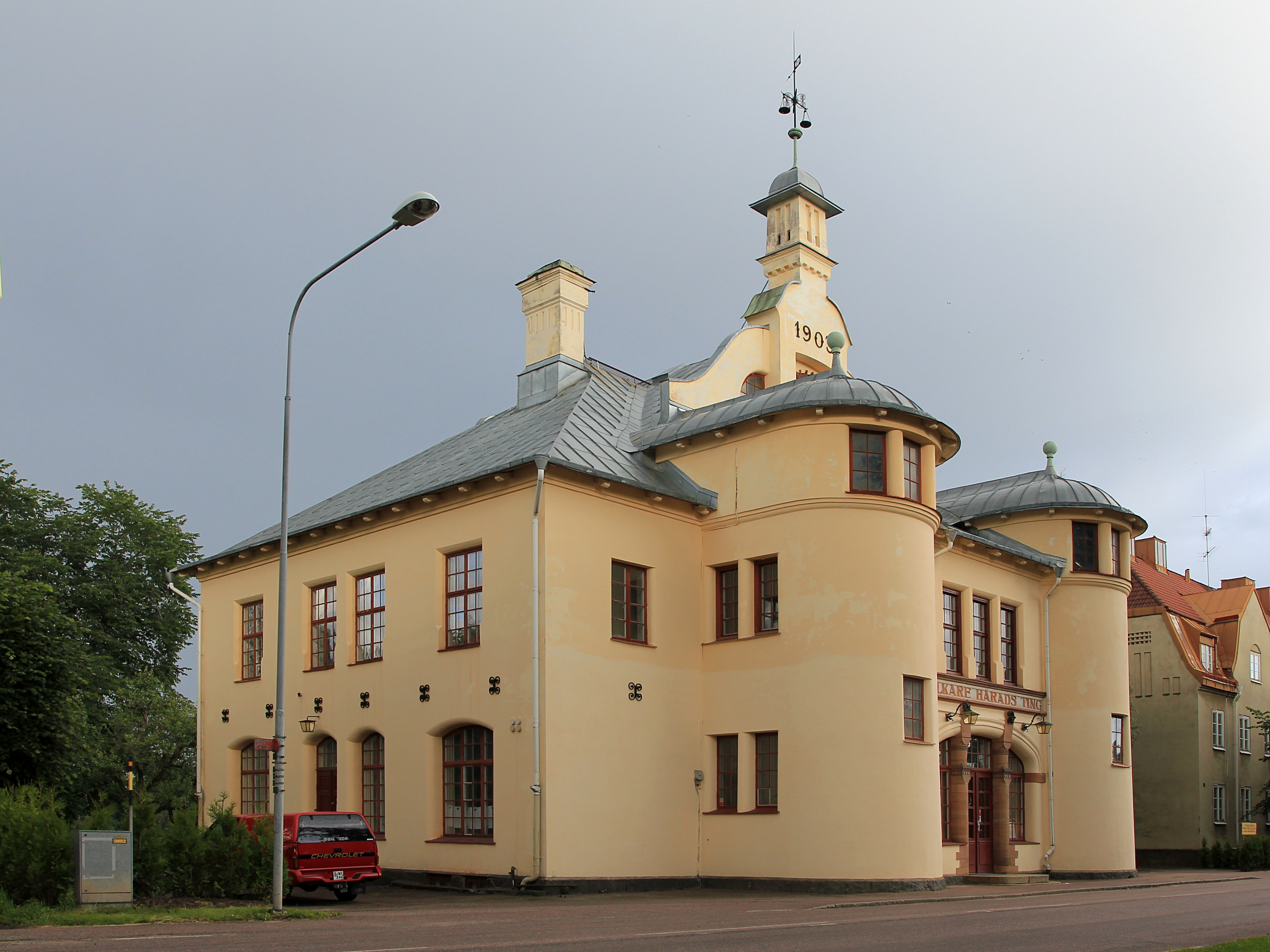
Krylbo Courthouse (1903)

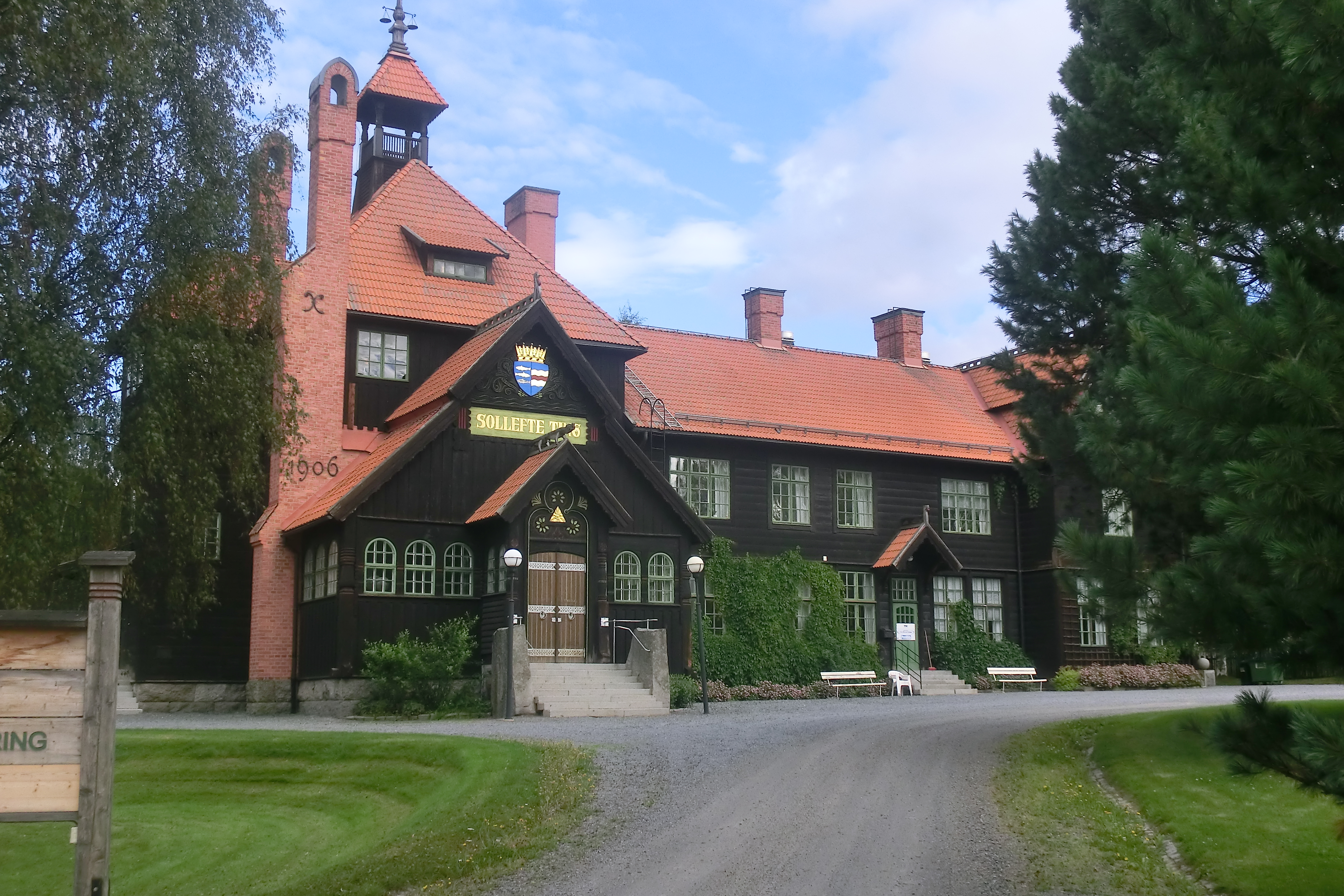
Sollefteå City Hall (1906)

== See also ==
- Architecture of Sweden
