= Torna Hällestad =

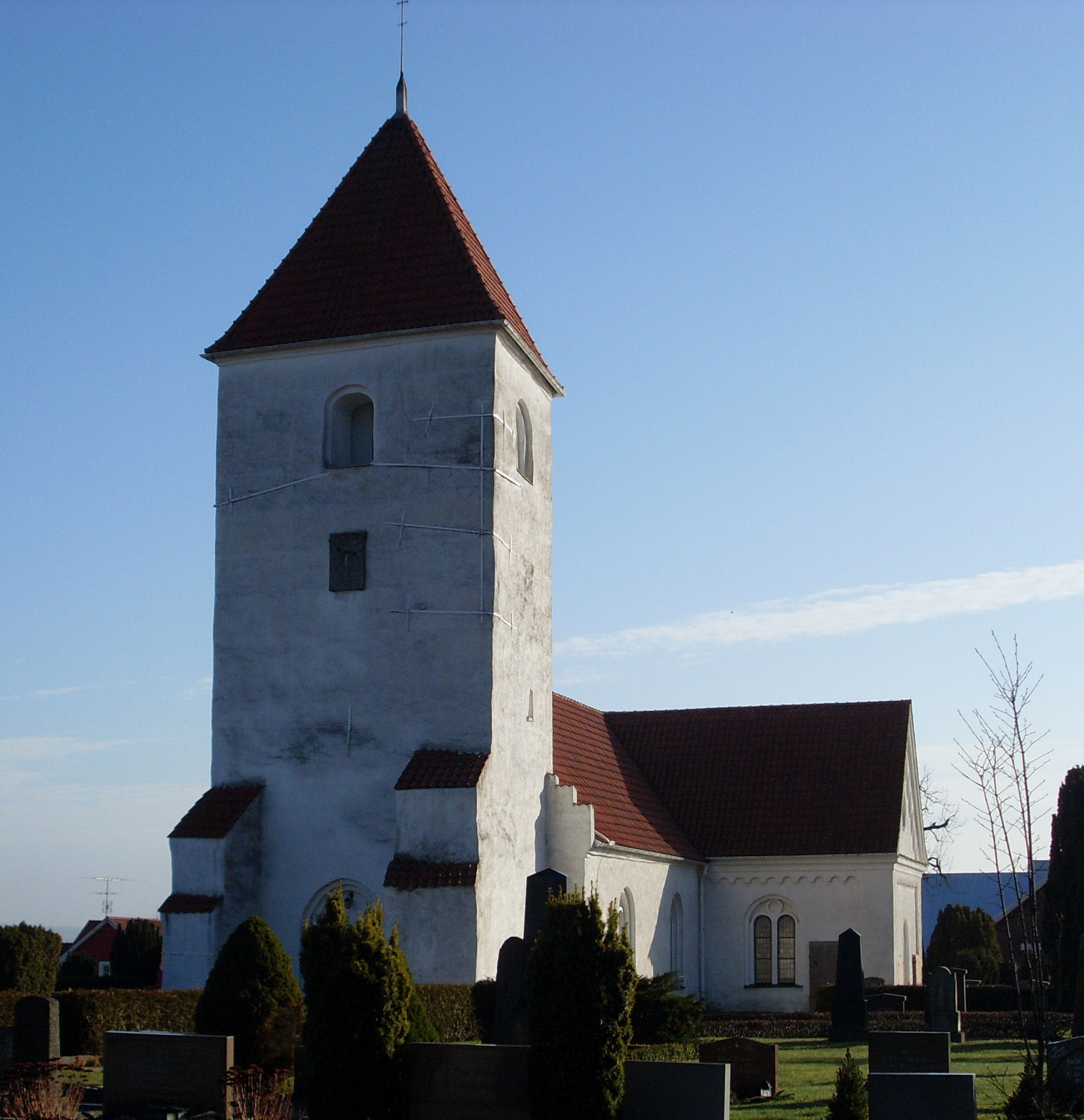
- Torna Hällestad Church

- Location within Skåne Location within Sweden
- Coordinates: 55°41′N 13°25′E
- Country: Sweden
- Province: Skåne
- County: Skåne County
- Municipality: Lund Municipality

Area
  - Total: 0.38 km^{2} (0.15 sq mi)

Population (31 December 2010)
  - Total: 584
  - Density: 1,544/km^{2} (4,000/sq mi)
- Time zone: UTC+1 (CET)
  - Summer (DST): UTC+2 (CEST)

Torna Hällestad is a locality situated in Lund Municipality, Skåne County, Sweden with 584 inhabitants in 2010.

== History ==
The town church, dating from the 12th century, features mural paintings from the 15th century. Three Viking age runestones, dating from the 10th century, were walled into the structure in the 19th century.
