= Södra Sandby =

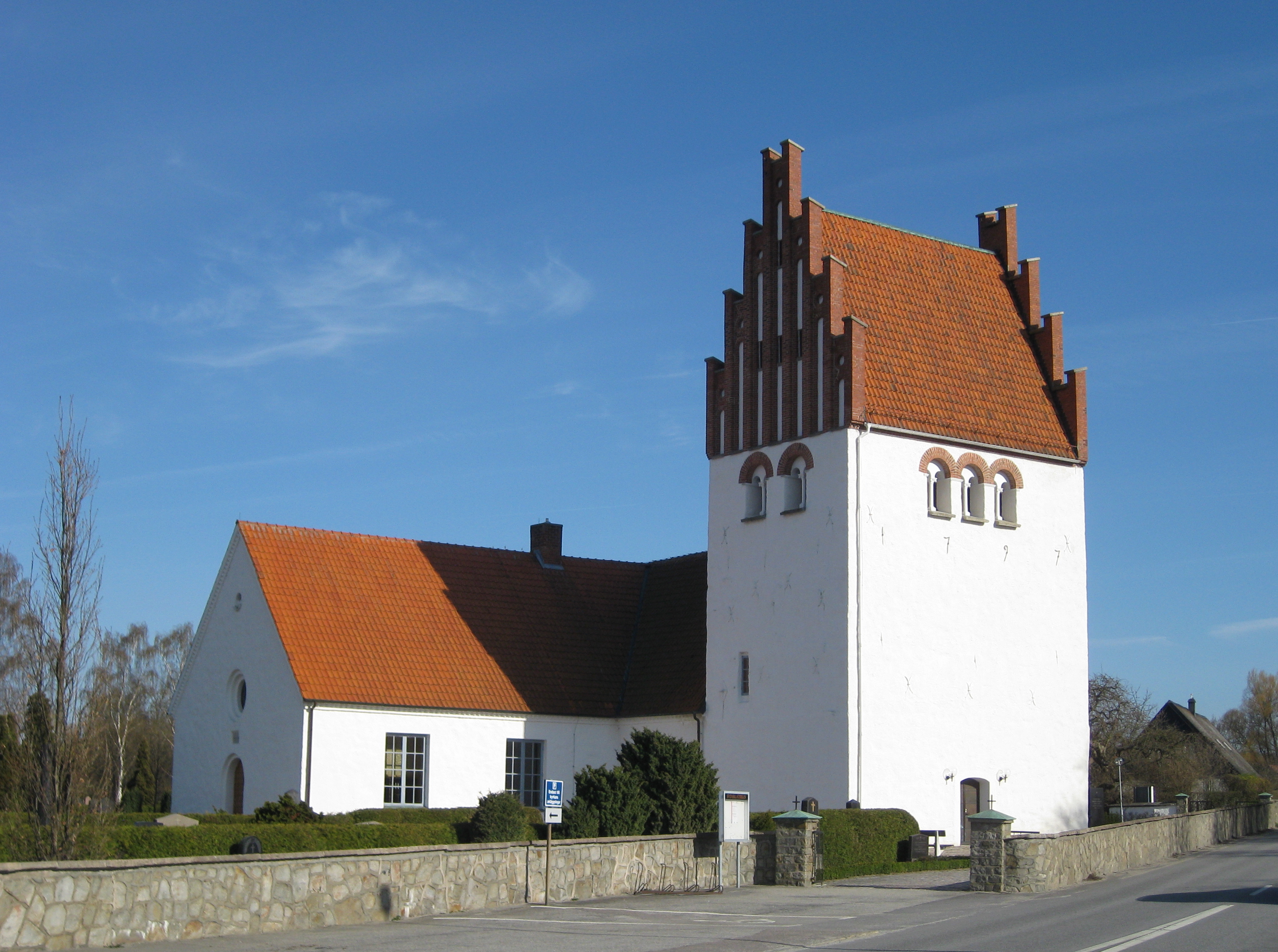
- Södra Sandby Church

- Location within Skåne Location within Sweden
- Coordinates: 55°43′N 13°21′E
- Country: Sweden
- Province: Skåne
- County: Skåne County
- Municipality: Lund Municipality

Area
  - Total: 3.63 km^{2} (1.40 sq mi)

Population (31 December 2010)
  - Total: 6,136
  - Density: 1,690/km^{2} (4,400/sq mi)
- Time zone: UTC+1 (CET)
  - Summer (DST): UTC+2 (CEST)

Södra Sandby is the second largest locality in Lund Municipality, Skåne County, Sweden with 6,136 inhabitants in 2010. It is situated about 10 kilometers east of Lund and 30 kilometers northeast of Malmö.

The Sandbian Age of the Ordovician Period of geological time is named for Södra Sandby where the Lindegård Formation crops out.

The oldest parts of the Södra Sandby Church date from the late 12th century.
