= All Saints Church, Lund =

Coordinates: 55°42′34.5″N 13°11′39″E

All Saints Church
- Allhelgonakyrkan
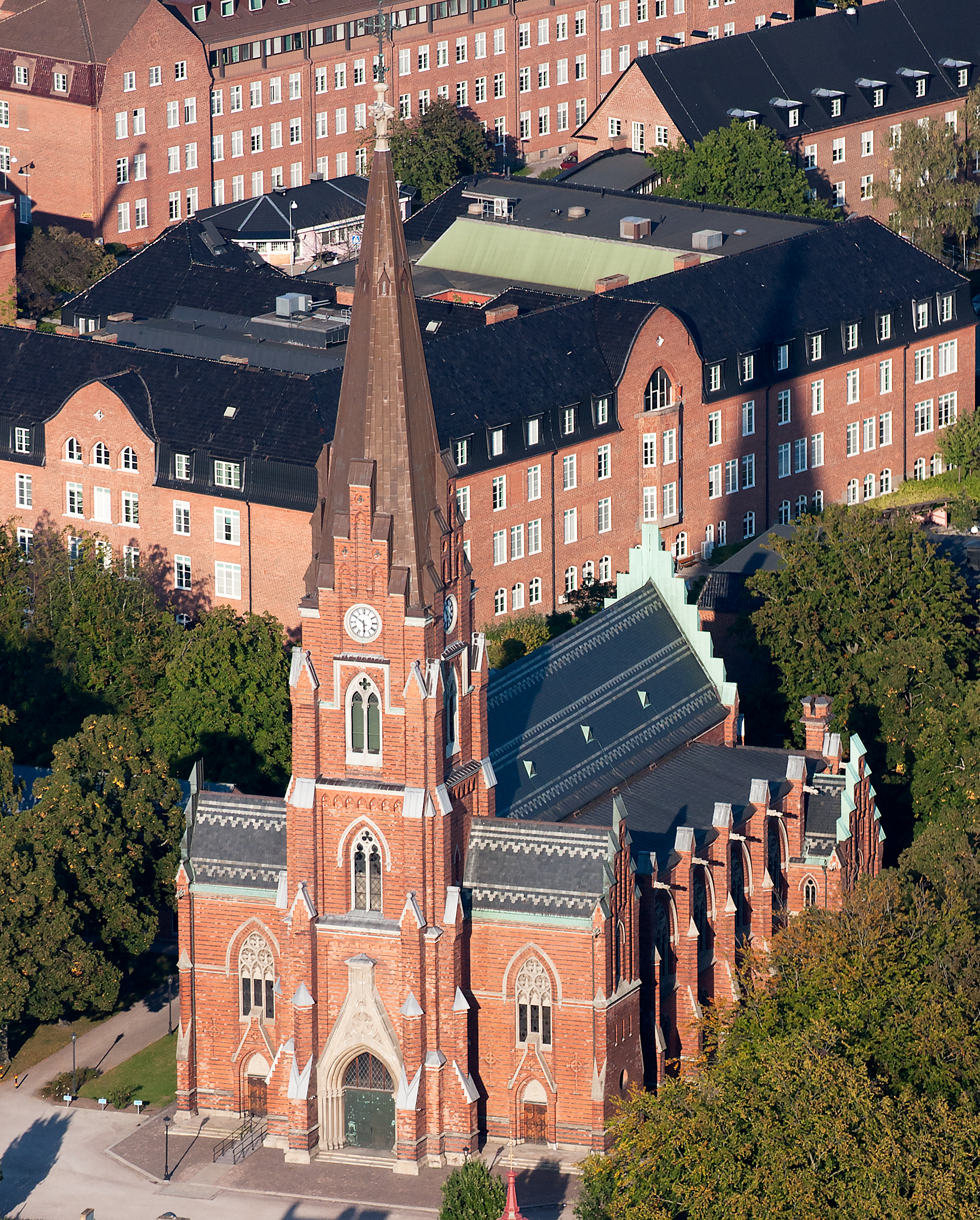
- September 2014 aerial view of the church
- All Saints Church
- Location: Lund
- Country: Sweden
- Denomination: Church of Sweden

History
- Consecrated: 1 November 1891

Administration
- Diocese: Lund
- Parish: Lund All Saints Parish

All Saints Church (Swedish: Allhelgonakyrkan) is a church in Lund, Sweden. Belonging to the Lunds All Saints Parish (Lunds Allhelgonaförsamling) of the Diocese of Lund, it was opened on All Saints' Day 1891. It is situated roughly 600 meters north of Lund Cathedral.

== History ==
It was designed by architect Helgo Zettervall (1831–1907) in Gothic Revival style. The altar is made of uncut cement. The decorative painting in the church is made by Svante Thulin (1837–1918). The baptismal font is made of polished cement and includes a copper bowl. It is performed by Sven Bengtsson. The altarpiece essay shows a crucifix and was made of wood by Carl Johan Dyfverman (1844–1892). The tower has three bells, cast by M & O Ohlsson bell foundry in Ystad which were inaugurated in 1966.

The church tower is 72 m high, making it Lund's second tallest building (after Ideon Gateway). It is in neo-Gothic style and can be seen far out over the plain. The tower currently has three bells, cast by Ohlsson's bell foundry in Ystad, and these were inaugurated in 1966 when the church turned 75. In total there are about 2,000 seats in the church. In the summer of 2009, the church underwent a renovation during which 5,000-6,000 of its stones were replaced.

== See also ==
- Lund 1 Runestone

== Other sources ==
- Wrangel, Ewert (1893) Allhelgonakyrkan i Lund : det gamla och det nya templet skildrade (Lund : Lindstedt)
