= Lund Municipality =

Lunds kommun
- Municipality
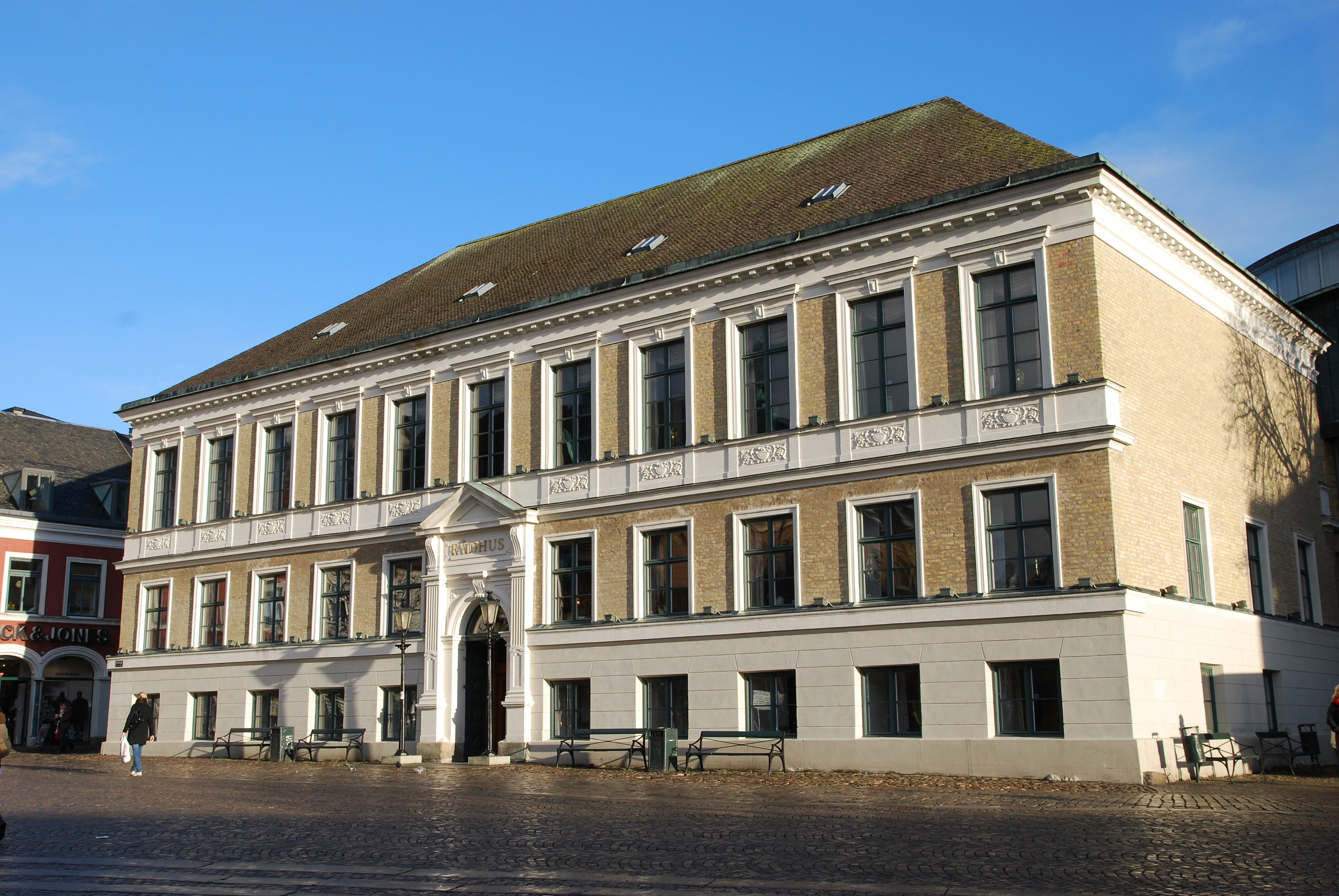
- Lund City Hall

- Coat of arms

- Coordinates: 55°42′N 13°12′E
- Country: Sweden
- County: Scania County
- Seat: Lund

Government
  - Mayor: Mats Helmfrid (Moderaterna)

Area
  - Total: 439.91 km^{2} (169.85 sq mi)
  - Land: 427.23 km^{2} (164.95 sq mi)
  - Water: 12.68 km^{2} (4.90 sq mi)
- Area as of 1 January 2014.

Population (30 June 2025)
  - Total: 130,534
  - Density: 305.54/km^{2} (791.33/sq mi)
- Time zone: UTC+1 (CET)
  - Summer (DST): UTC+2 (CEST)
- ISO 3166 code: SE
- Province: Scania
- Municipal code: 1281
- Website: www.lund.se
- Density is calculated using land area only.

Lund Municipality (Swedish: Lunds kommun) is a municipality in Scania County, southern Sweden. Its seat is the city of Lund.

As most municipalities in Sweden, the territory of municipality consists of many former local government units, united in a series of amalgamations. The number of original entities (as of 1863) is 22. At the time of the nationwide municipal reform of 1952 the number had been reduced to six. In 1967 the rural municipality Torn (itself created in 1952) was added to Lund. The City of Lund was made a unitary municipality in 1971 and amalgamated with Dalby, Genarp, Södra Sandby and Veberöd in 1974 completing the process. Since 2016, the municipality is subdivided into 16 districts for the purposes of population and land registration.

Dalby Söderskog, one of Sweden's national parks, is located within the municipality near Dalby. The municipal bird of Lund is the Eurasian penduline tit.

== Localities ==
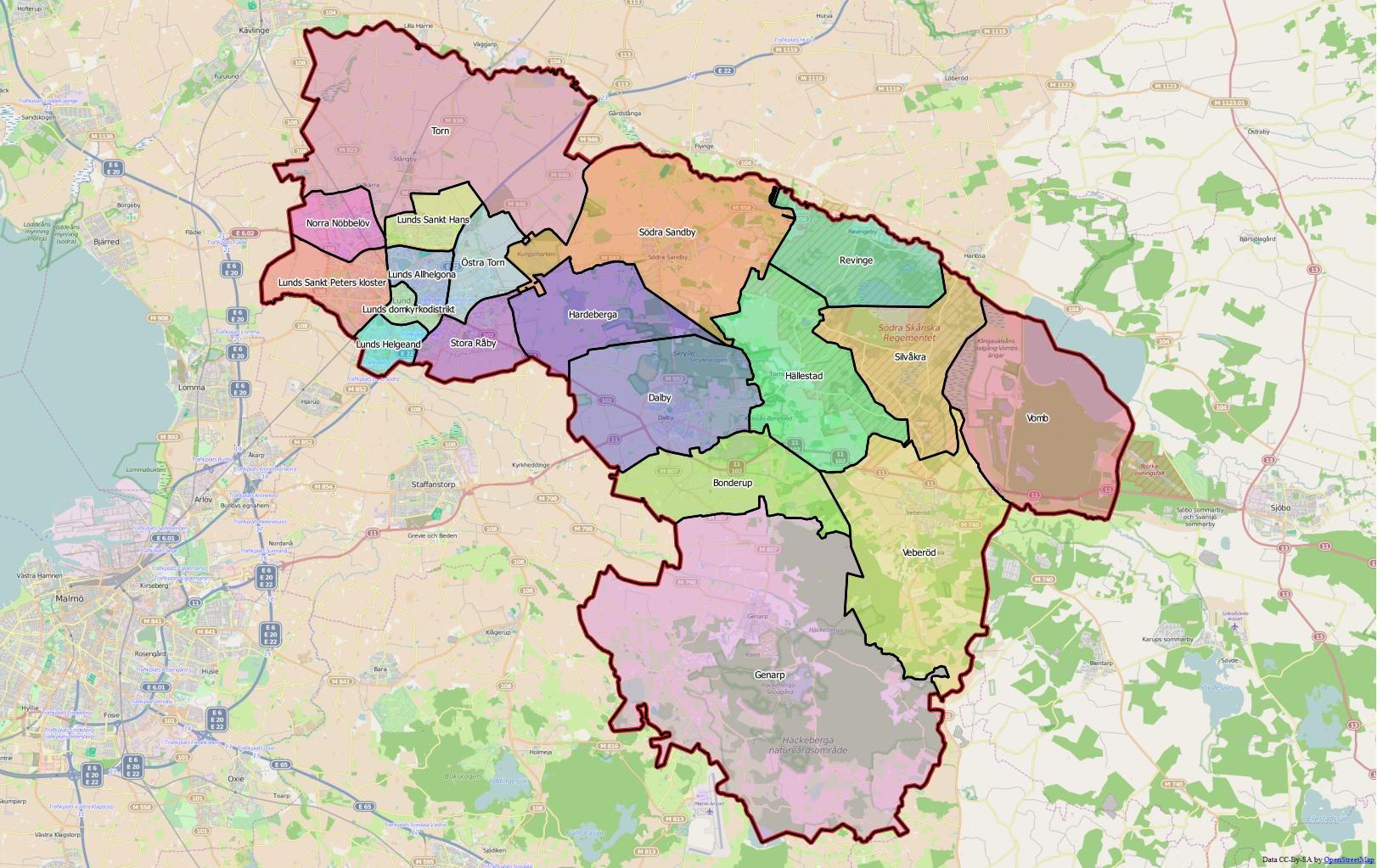
Districts in the municipality

There are nine urban areas in Lund Municipality:

#	Locality	Population
1	Lund	91,940
2	Dalby	6,486
3	Södra Sandby	6,285
4	Veberöd	4,971
5	Genarp	2,956
6	Stångby	2,032
7	Torna Hällestad	713
8	Revingeby	536
9	Vallkärra	425

== Demographics ==
This is a demographic table based on Lund Municipality's electoral districts in the 2022 Swedish general election sourced from SVT's election platform, in turn taken from SCB official statistics.

In total there were 127,202 residents, including 93,503 Swedish citizens of voting age. 57.1% voted for the left coalition and 41.4% for the right coalition. This was in stark contrast to the rest of the Skåne Southern constituency, that was won by the right with a sizeable margin. Indicators are in percentage points except population totals and income.

Location	Residents	Citizen adults	Left vote	Right vote	Employed	Swedish parents	Foreign heritage	Income SEK	Degree
Location			%	%					
Annehem	1,896	1,330	49.6	49.8	83	75	25	44,129	89
Brunnshög	1,175	942	57.2	41.5	66	61	39	16,877	76
Centrum, Clemens rote	1,290	1,134	57.5	41.5	64	77	23	25,871	77
Centrum, Drottens rote	1,663	1,416	54.9	43.7	70	81	19	27,856	80
Centrum, Färgaren	1,390	1,118	59.4	38.3	63	73	27	20,738	74
Centrum, Krafts rote	1,246	1,084	54.6	44.1	58	76	24	18,322	80
Centrum, Vårfru rote	1,426	1,294	53.6	45.3	53	82	18	14,157	78
Dalby, C-Nyvång	1,568	1,143	51.7	47.4	79	81	19	26,561	65
Dalby Kolonin	1,652	1,193	57.5	41.2	78	83	17	25,714	58
Dalby, Norrevång	1,628	1,173	52.3	46.4	82	88	12	30,333	65
Dalby, Pinnmöllan	1,222	810	62.0	36.9	83	86	14	29,543	62
Dalby, Stationen	1,579	941	47.7	51.3	79	77	23	30,236	58
Delfi	1,438	954	64.0	33.2	19	59	41	1,556	92
Fäladstorget	981	678	60.3	37.4	70	53	47	23,348	79
Galjevången	1,771	1,406	53.2	45.3	55	78	22	17,001	84
Genarp, Ekesvång	1,839	1,400	39.7	59.0	85	87	13	30,367	51
Genarp, Slätterna	2,270	1,537	43.8	55.1	83	80	20	29,277	52
Gunnesbo, Fornängen	1,745	1,331	58.3	39.5	80	68	32	28,371	56
Gunnesboparken	1,931	1,426	62.3	35.5	73	59	41	26,138	61
Gylleholm	1,188	752	60.5	38.1	33	64	36	3,623	86
Hospitalsgården	1,781	1,406	58.4	40.4	74	74	26	24,952	71
Klostergården C	1,365	895	65.5	33.1	64	51	49	19,850	60
Klostergården N	1,156	902	49.7	48.5	76	71	29	30,768	72
Klostergården SV	1,613	1,365	64.4	34.6	76	77	23	24,185	66
Klostergården SÖ	1,387	862	67.9	28.2	52	41	59	14,222	59
Klosterhusen	1,491	1,231	61.3	38.0	68	80	20	24,411	77
Kobjer-Sliparelyckan	1,765	1,330	67.9	31.1	74	77	23	28,794	80
Ladugårdsmarken	1,640	1,058	60.9	36.5	71	47	53	25,172	63
Linero, Gårdarike	1,661	1,179	57.2	41.2	79	60	40	30,157	69
Linero, Tre högars park	1,744	1,342	59.5	39.0	69	62	38	25,869	64
Linero, Vikingaparken	1,378	922	66.4	28.9	48	30	70	12,972	43
Mårtens Fälad	2,062	1,426	60.7	38.4	82	75	25	34,977	82
Mårtenslund	1,176	1,026	55.7	43.1	66	80	20	21,555	78
Måsen	1,151	920	58.7	40.3	64	74	26	23,028	81
Möllevången V	1,166	851	58.2	40.7	67	69	31	26,199	80
Möllevången Ö	1,175	810	59.2	38.9	57	68	32	17,073	78
N Fäladen, Borgareparken	1,657	1,277	66.9	31.6	62	73	27	27,003	86
N Fäladen, Kämnärsr. NV	957	690	68.5	28.7	38	65	35	4,131	87
N Fäladen, Kämnärsr. SÖ	1,063	698	65.9	32.1	26	65	35	2,689	90
N Fäladen, Rådhusr.	1,262	835	75.2	23.0	57	33	67	14,685	48
Nilstorp	1,882	1,377	59.4	39.5	74	85	15	31,168	84
Norra Nöbbelöv	802	595	59.7	38.8	82	77	23	32,395	83
Norränga	1,458	929	57.1	40.5	66	47	53	19,207	51
Nöbbelöv-Oscarshem	1,783	1,277	58.4	40.5	82	74	26	31,904	77
Nöbbelöv C	1,551	1,109	55.7	40.7	70	56	44	21,117	54
Nöden	1,471	1,248	58.7	40.8	61	78	22	18,456	79
Offerkällan	1,496	1,104	62.9	32.4	69	44	56	21,349	59
Olshög-Professorsstaden	1,731	1,361	51.1	46.4	57	76	24	26,569	83
Papegojelyckan V	1,898	1,385	69.9	28.7	68	59	41	20,587	61
Papegojelyckan Ö	1,629	1,331	58.3	40.0	73	77	23	25,307	76
Pilelyckan-Rådmansvången	1,420	1,093	66.6	31.3	72	76	24	24,201	74
Plantagelyckan	1,630	1,396	55.4	43.5	71	80	20	27,436	81
Revingelyckan-Margretedal	1,543	1,402	53.7	44.9	69	82	18	26,186	80
Råbylund	2,278	1,336	53.6	45.2	75	64	36	30,268	73
Sandby C	1,407	1,034	49.1	50.2	77	82	18	24,411	47
Sandby, Fågelsång	2,060	1,491	52.6	46.7	86	83	17	32,064	70
Sandby, Kyrkovång	2,026	1,410	48.7	50.3	85	82	18	31,495	63
Sandby, Västervång	1,291	905	50.1	48.3	86	84	16	31,453	65
Sandby, Östervång	1,932	1,407	45.8	53.2	86	85	15	30,006	61
Sankt Hans park	1,144	750	68.2	29.3	65	43	57	24,396	72
Sankt Lars	2,060	1,349	61.3	37.5	75	64	36	28,107	71
Spoletorp V	1,576	1,360	50.1	48.6	78	83	17	33,598	84
Spoletorp Ö	1,588	1,199	59.5	39.3	52	70	30	15,679	82
Stampelyckan-Planetstaden	1,344	1,096	60.7	38.8	59	78	22	15,635	83
Torn	1,938	1,255	52.7	46.4	86	80	20	34,184	69
Torna Hällestad	1,016	727	63.0	35.2	84	88	12	32,983	77
Tuna	1,594	1,219	58.1	40.5	28	67	33	3,263	89
Ulrikedal	1,106	999	66.6	31.9	35	73	27	4,465	92
Vallkärra	1,783	1,166	58.9	40.8	84	81	19	35,582	78
Veberöd, Björkhaga	1,772	1,202	38.4	60.9	84	85	15	30,914	45
Veberöd, Gamla byn	1,625	1,222	40.5	59.1	81	86	14	25,127	46
Veberöd, Idala	1,666	1,158	39.6	58.9	88	88	12	31,394	57
Veberöd Raggeborg	1,413	1,012	40.7	58.5	84	86	14	27,349	45
Vildanden	1,658	993	68.4	29.9	42	47	53	4,413	84
Vipelyckan	1,577	1,374	55.5	43.8	73	78	22	26,464	76
Värpinge-Klosters Fälad	1,517	1,082	58.0	40.7	74	68	32	26,979	68
Värpinge gård	1,841	1,391	64.1	34.1	72	60	40	23,601	62
Väster	1,436	1,175	59.0	39.0	72	75	25	26,322	72
Ö Torn, Gåsaftonen	1,622	1,223	63.3	35.2	71	66	34	26,237	73
Ö Torn, Orkesterparken	1,549	998	65.6	33.1	76	68	32	29,957	79
Ö Torn, Spexaren	1,769	1,149	77.5	20.4	80	74	26	31,851	82
Ö Torn, Vänortsparken	1,772	1,127	59.9	38.2	70	57	43	29,097	78
Source: SVT

== Municipal council ==
In the 2018 municipal election, no bloc was able to gain control of the executive, a five-party minority coalition consisting of the four Alliance parties and local party FörNyaLund was formed as a result. Philip Sandberg of the Liberals heads the executive. The election results are presented in the table below. The turnout was 86.37%.

Party	Votes	%	Seats	±
Social Democrats	16,348	20.39	13	−2
Moderate Party	13,169	16.43	11	−2
Liberals	10,753	13.41	9	+2
Green Party	7,623	9.51	6	−3
Sweden Democrats	7,544	9.41	6	+1
Left Party	6,899	8.61	6	+1
FörNyaLund	6,870	8.57	6	+2
Centre Party	5,020	6.26	4	+1
Feminist Initiative	2,285	2.85	2	0
Christian Democrats	2,162	2.70	2	0
Others	1,492	1.86		
Invalid/blank votes	828			
Total	80,993	86.37	65	-

== International relations ==
=== Twin towns — sister cities ===
The municipality is twinned with the following local government areas:

In Nordic countries:
- (Iceland) Dalvíkurbyggð
- (Norway) Hamar Municipality
- (Finland) Porvoo
- (Denmark) Viborg Municipality
Rest of the world:
- (Portugal) Coimbra
- (Germany) Greifswald
- (China) Hangzhou
- (Nicaragua) León
- (France) Nevers
- (Ukraine) Rivne
- (Poland) Zabrze
