= Helgo Zettervall =

Swedish architect (1831-1907)

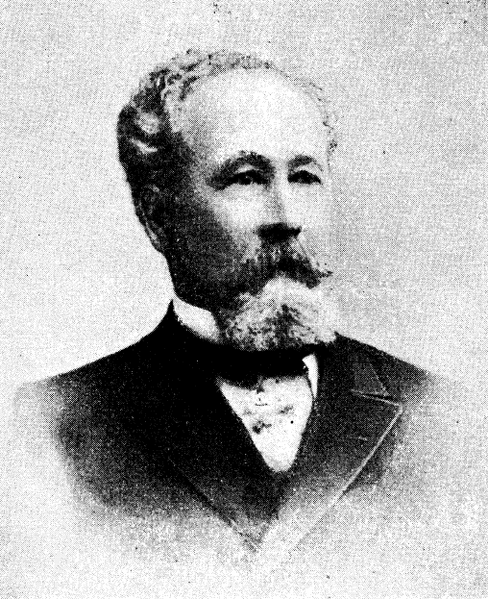
Helgo Zettervall, 1901

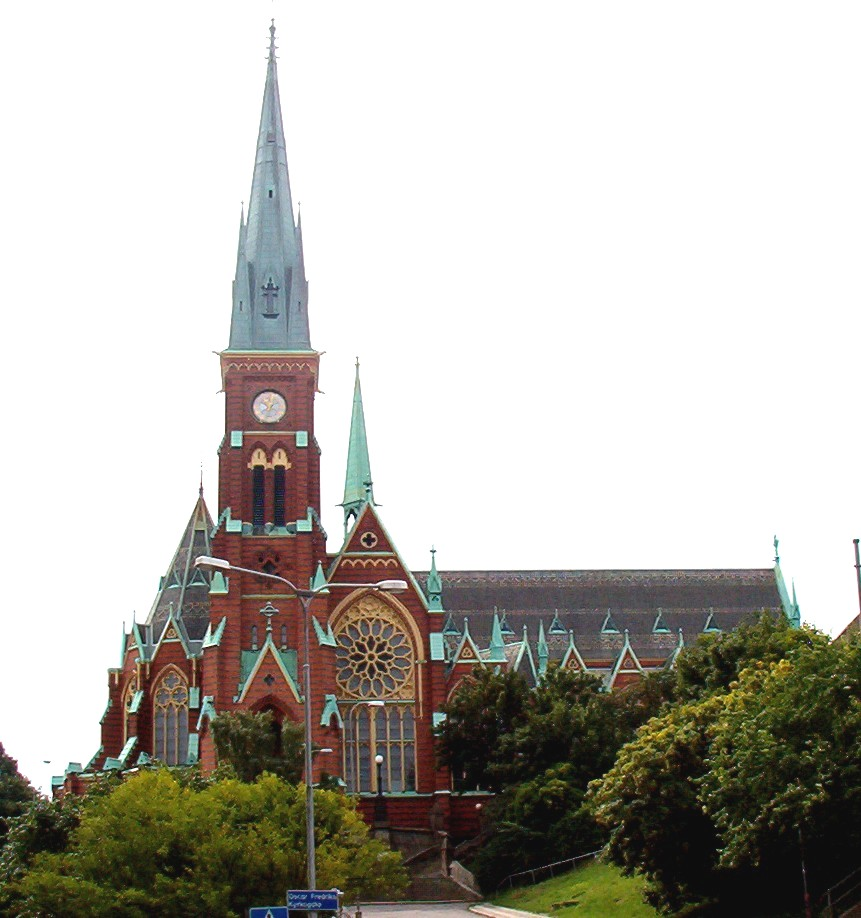
Oscar Fredrik Church in Gothenburg was erected in the 1890s

Helgo Nikolaus Zettervall, older spelling Zetterwall, (21 November 1831 – 17 March 1907) was a Swedish architect and professor of the Royal Swedish Academy of Arts. He is best known for his drastic restorations of churches and other buildings around Sweden.

== Biography ==
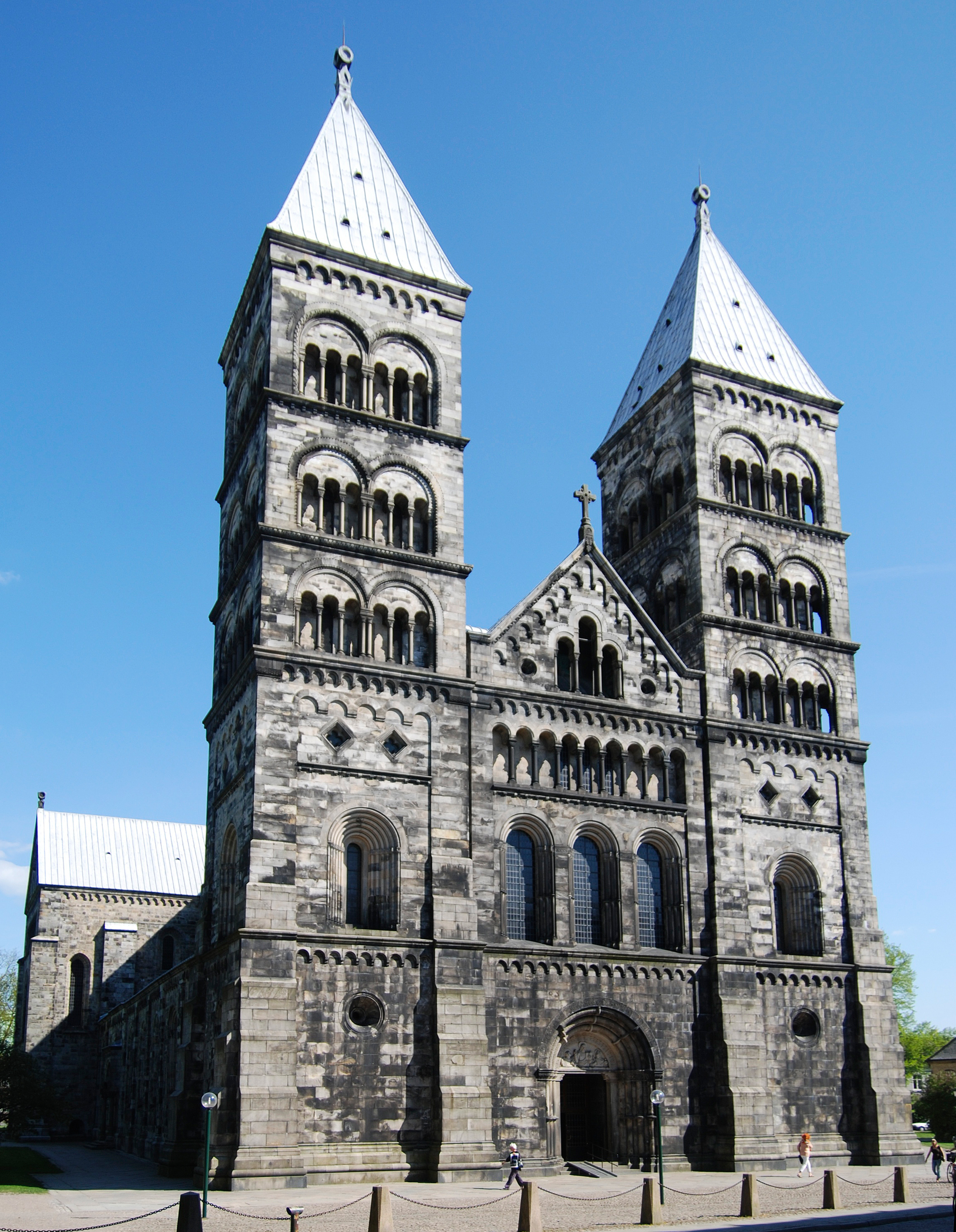
Lund Cathedral underwent extensive restoration between 1860–1902 under the direction of Helgo Zettervall.

Zettervall was born at Lidköping in Västra Götaland County, Sweden. He attended the Royal Swedish Academy of Fine Arts where he studied under Fredrik Wilhelm Scholander (1816–1881) and graduated during 1860. In 1862, he conducted a study trip to Germany, France and Italy.

After completing his studies Zettervall took over the restoration of Lund Cathedral from Carl Georg Brunius. Zettervall got the job after several more experienced architects had declined the job due to fear of Brunius. As the architect of the Cathedral, Zettervall also got other commissions for both church and other works in the Scania region. Some notable ones are Lund University Main Building (Universitetshuset), All Saints Church (Allhelgonakyrkan) in Lund and Nosaby Church.

He was chief of Board superintendent for the administration of state buildings (Överintendentsämbetet) from 1882–97. Zettervall was the chief architect in the restoration of old buildings and churches in Sweden during the period 1860–90. Among other commissions, Zettervall designed the plans for the renovation Uppsala Cathedral (1886–1893), Linköping Cathedral (1877–86), Skara Cathedral (1886–94) and Uppsala Cathedral (1885–93), as well as the Kalmar Castle (1886–90).

Oscar Fredrik Church (Oscar Fredriks kyrka) in Gothenburg was constructed on the basis of plans drawn by Helgo Zetterwall. The church was inaugurated on 2 April 1893 and is a prime example of Northern European Gothic Revival architecture.

== Style ==
Zettervall was a proponent of Gothic Revival architecture and is most commonly associated with his design of the plans for the extensive restoration of Lund Cathedral during the late 19th century. His influence has been criticized for his restoration principles. His restorations were often not intended to bring back old looks, but according to Zettervall to restore them according to the ideals in the style they were originally built in. One example of this is Zettervall changing the silloutte of Lund Cathederal's towers.

== Personal life ==
In 1861, he married Ida Anna Christina Lagergren. He was father to architect Folke Zettervall (1862–1955). He became an honorary member of the Royal Swedish Academy of Letters, History and Antiquities in 1884 and in 1897 was made a member of the Royal Swedish Academy of Sciences. He died in Stockholm during 1907 and was buried in the family plot at Norra begravningsplatsen

== See also ==
- Eugène Viollet-le-Duc
- George Gilbert Scott

== Other sources ==
- Bodin, Anders (2016) Zettervall i Lund : arkitektur och stadsbyggnad i 1800-talet (Lund: Föreningen Gamla Lund)
