= 2018 Nyköping municipal election =

Swedish local election

Nyköping Municipality held a municipal election on 9 September 2018, on the same day as the general and regional elections.

== Results ==
The number of seats remained at 61 with the Social Democrats winning the most at 20, a drop of two from 2014.

Party	Votes	%	Seats	±
Social Democrats	11,935	32.3	20	-2
Moderates	9,449	25.6	16	+2
Sweden Democrats	4,345	11.8	7	+1
Centre Party	3,011	8.2	5	0
Left Party	2,156	5.8	4	+1
Green Party	2,034	5.5	3	-3
Christian Democrats	1,855	5.0	3	+1
Liberals	1,698	4.6	3	0
Others	411	1.1	0	0
Invalid/blank votes	546			
Total	36,894	100	61	0
Source: val.se

=== By constituency ===
Location	Turnout	Share	Votes	S	M	SD	C	V	MP	KD	L	Other
East	87.8	34.8	12,828	28.7	29.4	10.7	8.1	5.9	5.7	5.2	5.1	1.2
North	84.3	31.7	11,682	36.1	21.2	13.4	8.3	5.7	5.2	5.0	4.0	1.0
West	86.6	33.6	12,384	32.5	25.9	11.3	8.2	5.9	5.6	4.9	4.6	1.1
Total	86.3	100.0	36,894	32.3	25.6	11.8	8.2	5.8	5.5	5.0	4.6	1.1
Source: val.se

== Urban and rural votes ==
=== Percentage share ===
Location	Share	Votes	S	M	SD	C	V	MP	KD	L	Other
Nyköping	67.3	24,836	34.5	26.3	10.0	6.0	5.9	6.0	4.9	5.2	1.1
Rural votes	30.8	11,354	27.7	24.5	15.7	12.8	5.5	4.3	5.3	3.2	1.0
Postal vote	1.9	704									
Total	100.0	36,894	32.3	25.6	11.8	8.2	5.8	5.5	5.0	4.6	1.1
Source: val.se

=== By votes ===
Location	Share	Votes	S	M	SD	C	V	MP	KD	L	Other
Nyköping	67.3	24,836	8,576	6,521	2,494	1,493	1,467	1,486	1,220	1,296	283
Rural votes	30.8	11,354	3,147	2,782	1,788	1,451	619	484	601	364	118
Postal vote	1.9	704	212	146	63	67	70	64	34	38	10
Total	100.0	36,894	11,935	9,449	4,345	3,011	2,156	2,034	1,855	1,698	411
Source: val.se

== Elected ==
Location	S	M	SD	C	V	MP	KD	L	Total
East	6	6	2	2	2	1	1	1	21
North	7	4	3	1	1	1	1	1	19
West	7	6	2	2	1	1	1	1	21
Total	20	16	7	5	4	3	3	3	61
Source: val.se

== Electoral wards ==
There were three constituencies, the Eastern, Northern and Western. The number of late-incoming postal ballots were 704 or 1.9% of the total ballots cast.

=== Nyköping ===
Location	Area	Turnout	Share	Votes	S	M	SD	C	V	MP	KD	L	Other
Alla Helgona	E	80.4	4.7	1,177	26.8	28.5	11.9	6.0	7.0	8.0	4.3	5.5	2.0
Brandholmen	E	88.4	6.0	1,497	33.0	28.8	8.1	7.1	5.3	4.7	5.6	6.1	1.3
Bryngelstorp	E	92.6	5.8	1,440	28.9	35.1	6.6	6.5	3.8	5.5	4.6	8.2	0.9
Centrum	W	83.9	6.5	1,619	29.5	32.6	10.1	5.8	6.4	6.2	4.1	3.9	1.4
Helgona	N	88.2	7.1	1,768	29.5	27.8	14.4	7.0	5.0	3.7	5.9	5.8	0.9
Herrhagen	W	79.5	7.2	1,797	35.8	28.9	5.1	6.5	6.4	6.7	5.8	4.0	0.7
Högbrunn	W	85.1	4.5	1,129	32.1	27.6	11.4	7.6	6.4	5.5	3.8	4.2	1.4
Isaksdal	N	85.0	5.9	1,461	33.3	23.5	10.1	6.0	6.8	5.8	6.6	6.2	1.5
Långsätter	W	89.8	4.1	1,020	37.9	25.0	8.9	6.0	5.6	4.9	4.6	5.8	1.3
Oppeby	W	86.4	4.7	1,175	40.3	22.1	12.3	6.1	5.3	5.4	4.6	3.3	0.6
Oppeby gård	N	79.6	2.5	610	42.8	16.4	17.4	4.6	6.9	4.1	3.6	3.8	0.5
Rosenkälla	E	87.5	5.0	1,246	35.2	30.3	8.5	5.5	5.1	5.0	5.3	3.9	1.1
Stadsfjärden	W	86.3	5.2	1,282	29.1	31.7	9.1	5.5	5.8	6.7	4.9	6.2	1.0
Stenkulla	E	79.2	5.1	1,260	38.1	20.6	13.8	6.1	6.4	3.7	5.5	4.8	1.1
Väster	W	79.6	5.6	1,392	26.9	25.8	11.4	8.2	7.1	6.3	6.8	6.3	1.1
V Brandkärr	N	69.5	5.1	1,276	57.9	11.2	7.7	3.3	5.3	8.3	2.8	2.8	0.7
Öster	E	85.4	5.8	1,435	31.1	28.7	10.3	4.8	6.8	6.8	4.8	5.5	1.1
Östra Bergen	E	85.0	4.8	1,183	31.5	27.4	10.7	5.6	5.2	5.2	6.5	6.3	1.7
Ö Brandkärr	N	78.1	4.3	1,069	47.9	14.7	7.9	4.2	6.5	11.4	3.6	2.6	1.2
Total			100.0	24,836	34.5	26.3	10.0	6.0	5.9	6.0	4.9	5.2	1.1
Source: val.se

=== Rural areas ===
Location	Area	Turnout	Share	Votes	S	M	SD	C	V	MP	KD	L	Other
Bergshammar	W	90.2	8.1	924	28.9	31.0	13.5	10.2	3.9	4.8	3.6	3.8	0.4
Kila	N	85.8	7.5	855	25.0	21.9	18.8	16.8	4.7	2.9	6.1	2.1	1.6
Koppartorp	W	91.8	4.8	540	26.7	19.1	13.1	17.4	5.6	4.8	5.0	6.1	2.2
Lunda	W	84.9	6.5	743	25.2	18.2	21.1	16.0	3.9	3.4	7.5	3.0	1.7
Nävekvarn	W	85.0	6.8	773	36.9	18.2	17.2	7.0	7.2	5.4	4.8	2.5	0.8
Runtuna	E	87.5	8.9	1,008	23.5	23.0	15.6	17.2	5.1	5.0	7.9	2.0	0.8
Råby-Ripsa	N	89.3	3.9	441	25.6	24.9	17.0	13.8	4.1	2.9	7.0	3.2	1.4
Stigtomta C	W	90.1	7.8	889	35.9	27.2	13.3	6.9	4.4	3.9	3.4	4.7	0.3
Stigtomta outer	W	87.8	8.8	998	28.4	21.1	17.2	13.2	6.1	5.0	5.7	2.3	0.9
Svärta	E	89.4	7.3	831	25.4	34.3	12.4	8.7	5.5	5.4	4.3	3.1	0.8
Tuna	W	88.6	9.0	1,024	35.3	24.4	12.1	7.2	4.5	4.0	6.9	4.4	1.2
Tystberga	E	81.6	13.2	1,500	21.6	26.9	16.3	14.8	8.5	4.1	3.9	2.9	1.0
Vrena	N	86.9	7.3	828	24.4	23.7	17.9	18.2	4.7	3.1	4.0	2.9	1.1
Total			100.0	11,354	27.7	24.5	15.7	12.8	5.5	4.3	5.3	3.2	1.0
Source: val.se
