= 2006 Nyköping municipal election =

Swedish local election

Nyköping Municipality in Sweden held a municipal election on 17 September 2006.

== Results ==
The number of seats remained at 61 with the Social Democrats winning the most at 26, a drop of three from 2002. The number of valid ballots cast were 31,589.

Party	Votes	%	Seats	±
Social Democrats	13,502	42.7	26	-3
Moderates	7,035	22.3	14	+6
Centre Party	2,518	8.0	5	+2
Christian Democrats	2,313	7.3	5	-1
People's Party	2,306	7.3	5	-2
Left Party	1,657	5.2	3	-2
Green Party	2,575	4.8	3	0
Sweden Democrats	613	1.9	0	0
Others	119	0.4	0	0
Invalid/blank votes	869			
Total	32,458	100	61	0
Source: val.se

=== By constituency ===
Location	Turnout	Share	Votes	S	M	C	KD	FP	V	MP	SD	Other
Eastern	83.6	33.0	10,415	38.6	25.0	8.3	7.7	8.4	4.7	5.4	1.6	0.3
Northern	79.3	31.3	9,885	46.1	19.0	8.9	6.8	5.7	5.6	4.9	2.6	0.5
Western	83.5	35.7	11,289	43.7	22.7	6.9	7.4	7.6	5.4	4.2	1.7	0.3
Total	82.2	100.0	31,589	42.7	22.3	8.0	7.3	7.3	5.2	4.8	1.9	0.4
Source: val.se

== Urban and rural votes ==
=== Percentage points ===
Location	Share	Votes	S	M	C	KD	FP	V	MP	SD	Other
Nyköping	65.9	20,832	45.2	22.3	5.1	7.4	8.1	5.4	4.7	1.6	0.3
Rural vote	33.3	10,511	38.2	22.1	13.8	7.2	5.7	4.8	5.0	2.7	0.5
Postal vote	0.8	246									
Total	100.0	31,589	42.7	22.3	8.0	7.3	7.3	5.2	4.8	1.9	0.4
Source: val.se

=== By votes ===
Location	Share	Votes	S	M	C	KD	FP	V	MP	SD	Other
Nyköping	65.9	20,832	9,421	4,642	1,061	1,541	1,682	1,120	971	325	69
Rural vote	33.3	10,511	4,020	2,324	1,448	759	596	506	526	284	48
Postal vote	0.8	246	61	69	9	13	28	31	29	4	2
Total	100.0	31,589	13,502	7,035	2,518	2,313	2,306	1,657	1,526	613	119
Source: val.se

== Electoral wards ==
There were three constituencies: Eastern, Northern and Western. Helgona, Herrhagen, Högbrunn and Väster had some sparsely populated rural areas part of the districts, but were all majority urban.

=== Nyköping ===
Location	Area	Turnout	Share	Votes	S	M	C	KD	FP	V	MP	SD	Other
Alla Helgona	E	77.9	6.7	1,395	39.9	27.3	4.2	7.4	8.4	5.5	5.5	1.4	0.3
Brandholmen	E	86.5	5.2	1,089	45.1	23.4	4.5	8.1	9.2	3.9	4.3	1.4	0.2
Bryngelstorp	E	90.6	6.4	1,335	36.1	30.8	4.2	9.7	11.8	2.5	3.2	1.2	0.4
Centrum	W	82.2	7.7	1,597	37.6	32.6	3.6	7.2	9.9	4.6	3.6	0.6	0.4
Helgona	N	82.0	6.6	1,375	43.8	25.7	5.3	6.2	7.9	3.7	4.9	2.0	0.4
Herrhagen	W	78.0	5.8	1,203	49.2	20.2	5.8	5.5	6.7	6.8	4.7	0.8	0.2
Högbrunn	W	81.3	5.0	1,033	42.1	23.4	7.2	6.8	7.1	6.4	5.3	1.4	0.4
Isaksdal	N	83.8	6.5	1,361	43.1	20.1	5.2	8.7	8.3	5.9	6.6	1.8	0.4
Långsätter	W	88.1	4.5	947	48.4	19.4	4.6	7.6	9.1	5.5	3.7	1.6	0.1
Oppeby	W	82.8	5.4	1,127	57.6	14.1	4.9	7.0	6.3	4.5	3.1	2.3	0.2
Oppeby gård	N	74.0	2.7	555	61.4	10.5	4.0	8.5	3.4	4.5	4.1	2.9	0.7
Rosenkälla	E	80.7	4.9	1,028	50.3	22.5	4.2	6.7	5.4	5.0	3.7	2.2	0.0
Stenkulla	N	74.7	4.7	983	57.8	9.9	4.3	6.7	5.7	6.9	5.4	2.8	0.5
Väster	W	78.9	7.3	1,527	35.6	27.5	5.4	7.8	10.9	5.5	5.5	1.4	0.4
V Brandkärr	N	63.0	3.8	794	62.2	8.2	5.0	7.6	1.8	10.3	3.0	1.6	0.3
Öster	E	82.9	6.9	1,444	38.4	24.8	7.3	6.1	9.7	6.6	6.0	0.9	0.3
Östra Bergen	E	81.6	5.0	1,044	42.0	22.6	5.8	8.2	10.1	3.6	5.8	1.3	0.5
Ö Brandkärr	N	73.1	4.8	995	51.6	15.5	5.6	8.0	5.9	7.0	3.9	2.0	0.4
Total			100.0	20,832	45.2	22.3	5.1	7.4	8.1	5.4	4.7	1.6	0.3
Source:val.se

=== Rural areas ===
Location	Area	Turnout	Share	Votes	S	M	C	KD	FP	V	MP	SD	Other
Bergshammar	W	88.4	7.4	778	39.1	26.6	8.4	9.1	6.0	4.0	4.5	2.1	0.3
Kila	N	81.1	7.4	773	34.7	22.3	17.1	7.1	4.1	4.1	5.8	4.1	0.6
Koppartorp	W	89.9	4.7	491	40.9	18.7	12.0	7.3	9.0	4.9	4.3	2.9	0.0
Lunda	W	79.3	6.5	687	37.3	18.6	16.0	11.2	5.2	4.8	2.8	3.3	0.7
Nävekvarn	W	85.7	8.3	875	48.6	17.9	8.8	6.4	4.6	6.6	4.5	2.2	0.5
Runtuna	E	83.9	9.0	943	30.0	25.7	20.0	8.9	4.0	3.2	6.4	1.2	0.5
Råby-Ripsa	N	85.5	3.8	404	32.9	31.4	14.4	3.0	6.2	3.2	5.0	4.0	0.0
Stigtomta C	N	87.8	8.2	857	48.5	19.8	8.8	5.3	6.7	4.2	3.7	2.9	0.1
Stigtomta outer	N	82.7	8.9	940	34.3	22.1	18.0	5.6	4.5	5.5	5.9	3.4	0.7
Svärta	E	86.8	5.9	625	37.1	20.3	12.5	7.0	8.8	5.9	6.4	1.9	0.0
Tuna	W	85.8	8.8	924	47.3	19.6	8.8	7.4	5.6	5.1	3.5	2.3	0.5
Tystberga	E	79.0	13.5	1,423	31.1	23.3	15.3	7.7	6.8	5.5	7.0	2.8	0.5
Vrena	N	84.1	7.5	791	37.9	23.0	17.2	6.2	3.9	4.4	3.5	2.9	0.9
Total			100.0	10,511	38.2	22.1	13.8	7.2	5.7	4.8	5.0	2.7	0.5
Source: val.se
