= 2010 Nyköping municipal election =

Swedish election

Nyköping Municipality in Sweden held a municipal election on 19 September 2010. This was part of the local elections and held on the same day as the general election.

== Results ==
The number of seats remained at 61 with the Social Democrats winning the most at 23, a drop of three from 2006.

Party	Votes	%	Seats	±
Social Democrats	13,400	39.8	23	-3
Moderates	8,401	25.0	15	+1
Green Party	2,575	7.7	6	+3
Centre Party	2,356	7.0	4	-1
People's Party	2,355	7.0	4	-1
Left Party	1,545	4.6	3	0
Christian Democrats	1,496	4.4	3	-2
Sweden Democrats	1,471	4.4	3	+3
Others	48	0.1	0	0
Invalid/blank votes	550			
Total	34,197	100	61	0
Source: val.se

=== By constituency ===
Location	Turnout	Share	Votes	S	M	MP	C	FP	V	KD	SD	Other
Eastern	85.4	32.9	11,085	36.3	28.0	7.7	7.0	8.0	4.2	4.9	3.8	0.1
Northern	81.0	31.9	10,722	43.2	20.7	7.7	7.8	6.0	5.2	4.1	5.3	0.1
Western	84.3	35.2	11,840	40.1	26.1	7.6	6.2	7.0	4.4	4.3	4.1	0.2
Total	83.6	100.0	33,647	39.8	25.0	7.7	7.0	7.0	4.6	4.4	4.4	0.1
Source: val.se

== Urban and rural votes ==
=== Percentages ===
Location	Share	Votes	S	M	MP	C	FP	V	KD	SD	Other
Nyköping	66.4	22,333	42.1	24.9	8.2	4.1	7.7	4.4	4.5	3.9	0.1
Rural vote	32.6	10,974	35.5	25.0	6.3	12.8	5.7	4.9	4.3	5.4	0.2
Postal vote	1.0	340									
Total	100.0	33,647	39.8	25.0	7.7	7.0	7.0	4.6	4.4	4.4	0.1
Source: val.se

=== By votes ===
Location	Share	Votes	S	M	MP	C	FP	V	KD	SD	Other
Nyköping	66.4	22,333	9,407	5,569	1,824	924	1,718	981	1,016	868	26
Rural vote	32.6	10,974	3,898	2,740	692	1,410	622	538	468	588	18
Postal vote	1.0	340	95	92	59	22	15	26	12	15	4
Total	100.0	33,647	13,400	8,401	2,575	2,356	2,355	1,545	1,496	1,471	48
Source: val.se

== Electoral wards ==
There were three constituencies: Eastern, Northern and Western. Helgona, Herrhagen, Högbrunn and Väster had a minority of their electorates located in sparsely populated rural areas, but were predominantly in the Nyköping urban area.

=== Nyköping ===
Location	Area	Turnout	Share	Votes	S	M	MP	C	FP	V	KD	SD	Other
Alla Helgona	E	82.4	6.9	1,542	37.8	29.2	9.5	3.4	8.0	4.4	4.2	3.4	0.1
Brandholmen	E	87.6	5.3	1,173	41.5	27.5	5.6	3.9	9.7	4.0	4.9	2.7	0.0
Bryngelstorp	E	91.0	6.1	1,360	34.6	33.6	6.8	4.7	10.7	2.3	4.9	2.4	0.1
Centrum	W	82.9	7.8	1,739	32.9	37.0	7.1	3.2	8.0	3.3	4.7	3.7	0.1
Helgona	N	84.0	7.2	1,613	37.0	27.3	6.6	6.5	8.8	4.8	4.5	4.3	0.1
Herrhagen	W	82.1	6.0	1,337	47.2	21.5	8.7	4.1	8.2	4.7	3.4	2.1	0.1
Högbrunn	W	81.0	4.9	1,085	38.9	27.4	7.9	6.4	6.2	5.0	3.5	4.6	0.2
Isaksdal	N	83.2	6.4	1,419	41.6	21.9	9.8	3.6	8.2	5.9	4.7	4.2	0.0
Långsätter	W	88.5	4.3	955	47.5	20.8	10.1	2.1	8.2	4.6	4.2	2.5	0.0
Oppeby	W	84.9	5.0	1,108	50.8	18.6	6.8	4.5	5.6	4.7	3.9	4.9	0.3
Oppeby gård	N	74.7	2.5	555	55.5	12.1	5.6	3.6	5.2	5.0	4.7	7.9	0.4
Rosenkälla	E	83.1	5.3	1,175	46.2	23.8	6.5	4.0	6.9	4.1	5.4	3.1	0.0
Stenkulla	N	78.2	5.5	1,225	49.5	17.4	8.2	3.2	6.6	5.0	4.3	5.8	0.1
Väster	W	79.0	7.0	1,568	33.4	31.0	9.7	4.9	8.5	3.6	5.1	3.6	0.2
V Brandkärr	N	65.2	3.9	877	64.8	7.0	11.5	2.3	1.7	5.1	2.7	4.9	0.0
Öster	E	83.0	6.7	1,492	36.1	26.7	8.8	5.1	9.9	4.9	4.6	3.6	0.3
Östra Bergen	E	83.8	4.8	1,061	39.0	27.0	8.6	4.5	7.5	3.7	6.4	3.2	0.1
Ö Brandkärr	N	73.2	4.7	1,049	51.0	15.5	8.9	3.0	5.2	5.0	5.4	5.9	0.1
Total			100.0	22,333	42.1	24.9	8.2	4.1	7.7	4.4	4.5	3.9	0.1
Source:val.se

=== Rural areas ===
Location	Area	Turnout	Share	Votes	S	M	MP	C	FP	V	KD	SD	Other
Bergshammar	W	87.2	7.8	854	36.5	29.7	6.2	8.9	6.9	3.4	4.3	3.6	0.4
Kila	N	82.4	7.3	801	33.5	22.8	6.0	19.2	4.1	5.1	4.5	4.7	0.0
Koppartorp	W	88.5	4.6	502	35.1	19.1	6.2	20.7	7.6	5.2	2.6	3.6	0.0
Lunda	W	79.9	6.7	740	35.3	22.2	4.7	12.4	5.8	4.3	7.6	7.2	0.5
Nävekvarn	W	85.0	7.9	866	45.2	21.2	6.2	6.6	4.7	6.1	4.2	5.8	0.0
Runtuna	E	84.7	8.4	990	29.4	27.3	6.2	17.4	4.8	4.0	6.1	4.7	0.1
Råby-Ripsa	N	84.0	3.9	427	27.6	29.0	7.5	15.9	6.3	4.7	3.0	5.9	0.0
Stigtomta C	N	89.7	8.1	893	43.1	23.0	6.4	5.6	7.1	4.8	3.6	6.2	0.3
Stigtomta outer	N	84.9	8.8	968	37.2	23.9	6.3	13.3	5.4	5.1	3.1	5.7	0.1
Svärta	E	87.9	6.3	695	32.8	32.1	5.6	10.1	7.5	4.5	3.2	4.3	0.0
Tuna	W	86.7	8.8	963	42.7	23.9	6.1	7.4	5.5	4.6	4.0	5.7	0.1
Tystberga	E	81.4	13.6	1,496	29.7	25.8	8.1	13.2	5.9	5.7	4.9	6.5	0.2
Vrena	N	84.7	7.1	779	32.3	24.4	5.3	21.8	3.1	5.8	2.7	4.4	0.3
Total			100.0	10,974	35.5	25.0	6.3	12.8	5.7	4.9	4.3	5.4	0.2
Source: val.se
