= 2014 Nyköping municipal election =

Swedish local election

Nyköping Municipality held a municipal election on 14 September 2014. This was part of the local elections and being held on the same day as the general election.

== Results ==
The number of seats remained at 61 with the Social Democrats winning the most at 22, a drop of one from 2010.

Party	Votes	%	Seats	±
Social Democrats	13,110	36.9	20	-2
Moderates	8,119	22.8	14	-1
Sweden Democrats	2,942	8.3	6	+3
Green Party	2,939	8.3	6	0
Centre Party	2,760	7.8	5	+1
Left Party	1,912	5.4	3	0
People's Party	1,716	4.8	3	-1
Christian Democrats	1,855	3.5	2	-1
Feminist Initiative	729	2.0	0	0
Others	85	0.2	0	0
Invalid/blank votes	618			
Total	36,191	100	61	0
Source: val.se

=== By constituency ===
Location	Turnout	Share	Votes	S	M	SD	MP	C	V	FP	KD	F!	Other
Eastern	87.1	33.5	11,928	32.9	25.6	7.7	8.6	8.1	5.7	5.2	3.6	2.1	0.3
Northern	82.9	31.4	11,183	40.1	19.1	9.4	8.1	8.3	5.3	4.3	3.2	1.8	0.2
Western	86.0	35.0	12,462	37.7	23.5	7.8	8.0	6.9	5.1	4.9	3.7	2.2	0.2
Total	85.3	100.0	35,573	36.9	22.8	8.3	8.3	7.8	5.4	4.8	3.5	2.0	0.2
Source: val.se

== Urban and rural ==
=== Percentage points ===
Turnout	Share	Votes	S	M	SD	MP	C	V	FP	KD	F!	Other
Nyköping	67.0	23,821	38.8	23.5	7.0	8.7	5.3	5.3	5.4	3.5	2.1	0.2
Rural areas	31.4	11,178	33.1	21.4	10.7	7.1	13.1	5.4	3.4	3.7	1.8	0.2
Postal vote	1.6	574										
Total	100.0	35,573	36.9	22.8	8.3	8.3	7.8	5.4	4.8	3.5	2.0	0.2

=== By votes ===
Turnout	Share	Votes	S	M	SD	MP	C	V	FP	KD	F!	Other
Nyköping	67.0	23,821	9,250	5,605	1,676	2,072	1,267	1,271	1,295	828	509	48
Rural areas	31.4	11,178	3,702	2,395	1,200	789	1,462	602	384	419	198	27
Postal vote	1.6	574	158	119	66	78	31	39	37	14	22	10
Total	100.0	35,573	13,110	8,119	2,942	2,939	2,760	1,912	1,716	1,261	729	85

== Elected ==
Location	S	M	SD	MP	C	V	FP	KD	Total
Eastern	6	5	2	2	2	1	1	1	20
Northern	8	4	2	2	2	1	1		20
Western	8	5	2	2	1	1	1	1	21
Total	22	14	6	6	5	3	3	2	61
Source: val.se

== Electoral wards ==
There were three constituencies, Eastern, Northern and Western. Helgona, Herrhagen, Högbrunn and Väster covered some sparsely populated rural areas, but had the vast majority of the wards within the confines of Nyköping's urban area.

=== Nyköping ===
Location	Area	Turnout	Share	Votes	S	M	SD	MP	C	V	FP	KD	F!	Other
Alla Helgona	E	81.0	6.8	1,628	33.5	25.7	8.1	10.3	4.7	6.6	5.9	2.9	2.0	0.2
Brandholmen	E	89.4	5.9	1,398	40.2	26.5	5.9	6.7	4.1	4.9	5.9	3.6	2.2	0.0
Bryngelstorp	E	90.4	6.1	1,451	32.9	30.5	4.6	7.9	6.9	4.3	7.6	3.4	1.8	0.1
Centrum	W	82.7	8.0	1,897	32.2	32.1	6.3	7.4	4.9	4.6	6.0	3.6	2.7	0.1
Helgona	N	84.5	6.9	1,644	37.0	25.9	9.1	7.0	6.6	4.1	5.7	3.0	1.5	0.2
Herrhagen	W	83.7	6.3	1,496	40.3	23.0	4.7	11.4	5.0	4.6	4.9	3.3	2.4	0.3
Högbrunn	W	82.6	4.6	1,104	36.1	20.8	8.5	7.9	8.1	7.5	5.3	2.8	2.6	0.3
Isaksdal	N	86.6	6.3	1,496	38.4	20.3	7.3	9.6	5.0	6.1	6.4	4.1	2.9	0.0
Långsätter	W	91.0	4.3	1,016	44.0	21.2	5.4	8.9	4.0	4.8	6.7	3.3	1.5	0.2
Oppeby	W	83.7	4.7	1,111	48.1	19.2	7.5	6.5	6.1	4.2	2.9	4.1	1.2	0.3
Oppeby gård	N	79.7	2.6	623	51.5	13.8	10.4	5.9	5.8	4.8	3.2	3.7	0.6	0.2
Rosenkälla	E	87.6	5.4	1,287	40.5	26.1	5.8	7.0	5.4	4.4	5.1	3.9	1.7	0.2
Stenkulla	N	79.1	5.3	1,254	42.9	18.8	9.7	5.5	4.9	6.7	5.7	2.5	2.9	0.3
Väster	W	80.1	6.7	1,605	31.9	28.3	6.7	7.9	5.7	5.7	6.4	4.2	3.0	0.3
V Brandkärr	N	66.4	2.7	641	60.8	8.0	8.0	10.3	4.4	4.5	1.9	1.1	0.8	0.3
Öster	E	84.9	6.7	1,599	31.7	26.6	7.5	10.4	5.8	6.4	5.7	3.4	2.4	0.1
Östra Bergen	E	83.5	4.9	1,167	33.2	24.5	6.7	9.4	5.4	6.0	5.8	5.0	3.3	0.7
Ö Brandkärr	N	72.8	5.9	1,404	50.6	11.3	6.8	15.3	2.8	5.5	2.9	3.7	1.1	0.1
Total			100.0	23,821	38.8	23.5	7.0	8.7	5.3	5.3	5.4	3.5	2.1	0.2
Source: val.se

=== Rural areas ===
Location	Area	Turnout	Share	Votes	S	M	SD	MP	C	V	FP	KD	F!	Other
Bergshammar	W	88.3	8.0	891	35.8	26.8	8.6	8.6	8.2	3.0	3.5	2.8	2.6	0.0
Kila	N	81.9	7.4	827	26.6	19.3	13.2	5.2	19.8	6.7	2.9	4.8	1.2	0.2
Koppartorp	W	90.4	4.8	540	34.3	17.4	8.3	7.2	15.2	7.2	5.0	2.8	2.4	0.2
Lunda	W	85.6	7.0	786	32.6	17.9	14.2	5.7	14.2	3.7	2.4	7.5	1.5	0.1
Nävekvarn	W	85.8	7.4	825	41.5	17.9	11.0	7.3	7.2	7.6	2.5	3.5	1.1	0.4
Runtuna	E	87.8	8.9	998	26.9	22.0	11.9	7.8	18.1	4.2	2.6	4.5	1.5	0.4
Råby-Ripsa	N	85.6	3.9	432	28.9	24.8	12.7	6.3	15.5	4.9	2.3	1.6	2.1	0.9
Stigtomta C	N	90.3	8.1	908	40.7	22.9	9.5	6.3	4.8	5.9	4.6	3.2	1.9	0.1
Stigtomta outer	N	87.1	8.6	965	33.5	20.5	11.3	7.4	13.7	3.9	3.3	4.4	2.1	0.0
Svärta	E	88.7	6.4	713	30.7	28.6	9.1	8.4	11.6	5.0	3.8	1.8	0.7	0.1
Tystberga	E	81.3	13.3	1,488	27.2	21.2	11.0	7.9	15.6	7.9	2.8	3.6	2.3	0.6
Tuna	W	88.4	9.1	1,016	43.0	19.3	8.6	7.3	6.9	3.9	5.4	4.1	1.5	0.0
Vrena	N	84.2	7.1	789	29.5	20.8	10.4	5.2	20.7	5.2	3.5	2.5	2.0	0.1
Total			100.0	11,178	33.1	21.4	10.7	7.1	13.1	5.4	3.4	3.7	1.8	0.2
Source: val.se
