= 1998 Nyköping municipal election =

Swedish local election

Nyköping Municipality in Sweden held a municipal election on 20 September 1998. The election was part of the local elections and held on the same day as the general election.

== Results ==
The number of seats remained at 61 with the Social Democrats winning the most at 25, a drop of nine from 1994, losing its overall majority. The number of valid ballots cast were 30,603.

Party	Votes	%	Seats	±
Social Democrats	13,020	42.5	25	-9
Moderates	6,645	21.7	13	+1
Left Party	2,904	9.5	6	+3
Christian Democrats	2,507	8.2	6	+5
Centre Party	2,432	7.9	5	-1
People's Party	1,692	5.5	3	0
Green Party	1,225	4.0	3	+1
Others	178	0.6	0	0
Invalid/blank votes	766			
Total	31,369	100	61	0
Source: SCB

=== By constituency ===
Location	Turnout	Share	Votes	S	M	V	KD	C	FP	MP	Other
Eastern (3nd)	82.7	32.7	10,021	37.9	25.6	8.5	8.6	8.4	6.4	4.2	0.5
Northern (1st)	79.9	31.6	9,684	45.9	17.5	10.7	8.0	8.7	4.2	4.3	0.7
Western (2nd)	82.8	35.6	10,898	43.9	21.9	9.3	8.0	6.8	5.9	3.6	0.5
Total	81.8	100.0	30,603	42.5	21.7	9.5	8.2	7.9	5.5	4.0	0.6
Source: SCB

== Urban and rural vote ==
=== Percentage points ===
Location	Share	Votes	S	M	V	KD	C	FP	MP	Other
Nyköping	66.2	20,245	44.4	22.1	9.8	8.1	5.1	6.2	3.7	0.6
Rural vote	33.2	10,153	39.1	20.7	8.9	8.4	13.7	4.1	4.6	0.5
Postal vote	0.7	205								
Total	100.0	30,603	42.5	21.7	9.5	8.2	7.9	5.5	4.0	0.6
Source: val.se

=== By votes ===
Location	Share	Votes	S	M	V	KD	C	FP	MP	Other
Nyköping	66.2	20,245	8,990	4,480	1,976	1,642	1,031	1,258	743	125
Rural vote	33.2	10,153	3,970	2,097	906	853	1,392	421	466	48
Postal vote	0.7	205	60	68	22	12	9	13	16	5
Total	100.0	30,603	13,020	6,645	2,904	2,507	2,432	1,692	1,225	178
Source: SCB

== Electoral wards ==
=== Nyköping ===
Location	#	Area	Share	Votes	S	M	V	KD	C	FP	MP	Other
Alla Helgona	8	E	6.7	1,347	38.5	32.0	7.1	8.2	4.5	6.2	3.0	0.4
Brandholmen	16	E	4.9	1,002	46.9	20.3	9.0	8.4	6.1	6.5	2.3	0.6
Bryngelstorp	17	E	6.1	1,244	33.3	34.8	4.3	8.3	5.1	10.9	3.2	0.2
Centrum	1	W	7.6	1,531	33.6	36.6	6.9	8.4	3.8	6.7	3.4	0.5
Helgona		N	6.5	1,309	43.5	22.2	9.1	9.4	4.7	6.3	4.5	0.4
Herrhagen	6	W	4.9	990	52.1	18.2	9.0	5.9	4.6	5.6	4.2	0.4
Högbrunn	4	W	4.8	979	45.5	19.0	11.0	7.3	7.3	4.9	4.6	0.5
Isaksdal	10	N	6.6	1,338	43.7	18.3	11.4	9.0	5.2	6.4	5.0	1.0
Långsätter	5	W	4.7	956	44.9	17.9	11.1	7.2	5.9	8.2	4.4	0.5
Oppeby	7	W	5.9	1,203	56.7	14.5	9.6	6.2	5.5	3.9	2.6	0.9
Oppeby gård	3	N	3.0	605	56.7	9.1	14.9	8.3	5.5	2.1	3.0	0.5
Rosenkälla	14	E	5.6	1,136	49.2	18.8	8.8	8.5	3.8	6.1	4.0	0.8
Stenkulla	15	N	5.3	1,071	58.6	9.0	11.2	7.9	4.7	4.9	2.5	1.1
Väster	2	W	7.5	1,525	35.5	28.5	8.7	10.7	5.0	7.8	3.5	0.3
V Brandkärr	12	N	3.5	718	59.2	6.8	15.3	5.2	6.5	1.7	4.3	1.0
Öster	9	E	6.7	1,348	38.6	26.9	11.6	7.3	3.9	6.4	4.7	0.4
Östra Bergen	13	E	5.3	1,069	38.5	25.4	9.7	8.0	6.3	8.0	3.3	0.8
Ö Brandkärr	11	N	4.3	874	47.8	14.1	14.2	9.5	5.7	4.5	3.1	1.1
Total			100.0	20,245	44.4	22.1	9.8	8.1	5.1	6.2	3.7	0.6
Source: SCB

=== Rural areas ===
Location	Area	Share	Votes	S	M	V	KD	C	FP	MP	Other
Bergshammar	W	7.4	753	40.6	23.0	7.4	7.6	10.8	6.4	4.0	0.3
Kila	N	7.6	772	36.0	21.4	7.6	8.2	17.6	1.4	7.3	0.5
Koppartorp	W	4.4	443	38.8	11.5	13.1	9.0	11.7	11.3	4.5	0.0
Lunda	W	7.0	714	41.9	17.4	9.9	11.5	13.6	2.9	2.7	0.1
Nävekvarn	W	7.8	787	52.4	15.9	10.9	6.9	6.9	2.9	3.3	0.9
Runtuna	E	9.0	911	26.2	27.3	6.9	9.8	20.9	3.1	5.8	0.0
Råby-Rönö	N	3.6	369	30.1	23.8	11.4	7.6	18.2	2.2	6.5	0.3
Stigtomta 1	N	8.5	858	49.8	18.8	7.2	8.5	6.6	5.0	3.8	0.2
Stigtomta 2	N	8.9	902	36.7	25.3	7.9	6.3	13.7	4.2	5.1	0.8
Svärta	E	5.4	549	36.8	20.4	10.0	8.9	14.6	4.9	4.2	0.2
Tuna	W	9.3	944	46.8	19.5	7.8	7.9	8.9	5.3	2.9	0.8
Tystberga	E	13.2	1,336	32.5	19.4	9.9	10.2	16.6	4.0	6.5	0.9
Vrena	N	8.0	815	38.9	21.8	9.4	6.1	18.2	2.5	2.7	0.4
Total		100.0	10,153	39.1	20.7	8.9	8.4	13.7	4.1	4.6	0.5
Source: SCB
