= 2002 Nyköping municipal election =

Swedish local election

Nyköping Municipality in Sweden held a municipal election on 15 September 2002.

== Results ==
The number of seats remained at 61 with the Social Democrats winning the most at 29, an increase of four from 1998. The number of valid ballots cast were 30,844.

| Party | Votes | % | Seats | ± |
|---|---|---|---|---|
| Social Democrats | 14,358 | 46.6 | 29 | +4 |
| Moderates | 4,544 | 14.8 | 8 | -5 |
| People's Party | 3,382 | 11.0 | 7 | +4 |
| Christian Democrats | 2,313 | 8.3 | 6 | 0 |
| Left Party | 2,385 | 7.7 | 5 | -1 |
| Centre Party | 2,151 | 7.0 | 3 | -2 |
| Green Party | 1,151 | 3.7 | 3 | 0 |
| Others | 314 | 1.0 | 0 | 0 |
| Invalid/blank votes | 543 | | | |
| Total | 31,387 | 100 | 61 | 0 |
Source: val.se

=== By constituency ===
| Location | Turnout | Share | Votes | S | M | FP | KD | V | C | MP | Other |
|---|---|---|---|---|---|---|---|---|---|---|---|
| Eastern | 83.0 | 32.9 | 10,145 | 42.7 | 17.0 | 12.8 | 8.5 | 6.7 | 7.5 | 4.0 | 1.0 |
| Northern | 78.5 | 31.6 | 9,758 | 49.4 | 12.0 | 8.8 | 8.2 | 8.8 | 7.8 | 3.8 | 1.3 |
| Western | 82.2 | 35.5 | 10,941 | 47.6 | 15.1 | 11.2 | 8.2 | 7.8 | 5.8 | 3.5 | 0.9 |
| Total | 81.3 | 100.0 | 30,844 | 46.6 | 14.7 | 11.0 | 8.3 | 7.7 | 7.0 | 3.7 | 1.0 |
Source: val.se

== Urban and rural votes ==
=== Percentage points ===
| Location | Share | Votes | S | M | FP | KD | V | C | MP | Other |
|---|---|---|---|---|---|---|---|---|---|---|
| Nyköping | 66.6 | 20,535 | 48.4 | 14.8 | 11.8 | 8.1 | 8.2 | 4.2 | 3.4 | 1.0 |
| Rural vote | 32.8 | 10,132 | 43.1 | 14.4 | 9.3 | 8.7 | 6.7 | 12.5 | 4.3 | 1.1 |
| Postal vote | 0.6 | 177 | | | | | | | | |
| Total | 100.0 | 30,844 | 46.6 | 14.7 | 11.0 | 8.3 | 7.7 | 7.0 | 3.7 | 1.0 |
Source: val.se

=== By votes ===
| Location | Share | Votes | S | M | FP | KD | V | C | MP | Other |
|---|---|---|---|---|---|---|---|---|---|---|
| Nyköping | 66.6 | 20,535 | 9,948 | 3,048 | 2,415 | 1,664 | 1,691 | 870 | 698 | 201 |
| Rural vote | 32.8 | 10,132 | 4,368 | 1,454 | 942 | 879 | 675 | 1,266 | 436 | 112 |
| Postal vote | 0.6 | 177 | 42 | 42 | 25 | 16 | 19 | 15 | 17 | 1 |
| Total | 100.0 | 30,844 | 14,358 | 4,544 | 3,382 | 2,559 | 2,385 | 2,151 | 1,151 | 314 |
Source: val.se

== Constituencies ==
=== Nyköping Eastern ===
| Location | Turnout | Share | Votes | S | M | FP | KD | V | C | MP | Other |
|---|---|---|---|---|---|---|---|---|---|---|---|
| Alla Helgona | 78.7 | 13.8 | 1,400 | 43.3 | 22.5 | 12.5 | 6.7 | 7.1 | 4.1 | 3.0 | 0.8 |
| Brandholmen | 87.0 | 9.6 | 975 | 51.8 | 13.3 | 13.4 | 8.1 | 6.4 | 3.4 | 2.7 | 0.9 |
| Bryngelstorp | 91.7 | 13.3 | 1,354 | 40.3 | 21.0 | 18.5 | 9.4 | 3.8 | 3.6 | 2.9 | 0.5 |
| Rosenkälla | 80.2 | 10.7 | 1,088 | 52.0 | 14.1 | 11.0 | 7.2 | 7.3 | 3.6 | 3.8 | 1.1 |
| Runtuna | 83.7 | 8.9 | 902 | 31.0 | 16.6 | 8.0 | 10.9 | 5.0 | 21.8 | 5.3 | 1.3 |
| Svärta | 87.0 | 5.5 | 554 | 43.1 | 12.8 | 12.6 | 8.3 | 7.4 | 11.9 | 3.4 | 0.4 |
| Tystberga | 78.5 | 13.2 | 1,343 | 36.9 | 13.8 | 10.7 | 9.2 | 7.7 | 15.0 | 5.4 | 1.0 |
| Öster | 80.3 | 14.0 | 1,423 | 42.2 | 16.7 | 13.8 | 9.5 | 8.6 | 3.5 | 4.8 | 0.9 |
| Östra Bergen | 81.4 | 10.4 | 1,052 | 45.8 | 17.4 | 11.8 | 7.7 | 6.7 | 5.8 | 4.1 | 0.7 |
| Postal vote | | 0.5 | 54 | | | | | | | | |
| Total | 83.0 | 32.9 | 10,145 | 42.7 | 17.0 | 12.8 | 8.5 | 6.7 | 7.5 | 4.0 | 1.0 |
Source: val.se

=== Nyköping Northern ===
| Location | Turnout | Share | Votes | S | M | FP | KD | V | C | MP | Other |
|---|---|---|---|---|---|---|---|---|---|---|---|
| Helgona | 80.5 | 13.6 | 1,324 | 47.9 | 13.6 | 11.6 | 7.9 | 8.6 | 5.5 | 3.0 | 2.0 |
| Isaksdal | 82.8 | 13.7 | 1,339 | 47.0 | 12.6 | 11.5 | 8.9 | 10.2 | 4.0 | 4.7 | 1.2 |
| Kila | 79.5 | 7.6 | 742 | 36.8 | 16.2 | 5.4 | 12.4 | 5.7 | 17.1 | 5.4 | 1.1 |
| Oppeby gård | 77.8 | 5.9 | 578 | 60.9 | 6.9 | 5.9 | 8.7 | 10.0 | 3.1 | 2.1 | 2.4 |
| Råby-Ripsa | 86.9 | 4.3 | 415 | 38.6 | 14.9 | 10.8 | 7.7 | 7.0 | 12.8 | 6.7 | 1.4 |
| Stenkulla | 76.5 | 10.8 | 1,058 | 61.7 | 7.0 | 8.8 | 6.8 | 8.9 | 3.6 | 2.6 | 0.6 |
| Stigtomta C | 88.0 | 8.8 | 862 | 55.1 | 11.6 | 9.6 | 7.5 | 6.4 | 6.5 | 2.2 | 1.0 |
| Stigtomta outer | 81.2 | 9.3 | 907 | 40.2 | 18.1 | 8.9 | 7.6 | 5.1 | 13.9 | 5.1 | 1.1 |
| Vrena | 84.4 | 8.2 | 797 | 43.0 | 15.6 | 6.8 | 7.7 | 7.3 | 15.1 | 3.6 | 1.0 |
| V Brandkärr | 60.6 | 8.2 | 796 | 60.1 | 4.9 | 4.6 | 4.9 | 14.7 | 6.4 | 2.4 | 2.0 |
| Ö Brandkärr | 70.5 | 9.2 | 895 | 50.2 | 10.1 | 9.3 | 9.7 | 11.3 | 4.5 | 4.0 | 1.0 |
| Postal vote | | 0.5 | 45 | | | | | | | | |
| Total | 78.5 | 31.3 | 9,758 | 49.4 | 12.0 | 8.8 | 8.2 | 8.8 | 7.8 | 3.8 | 1.3 |
Source: val.se

=== Nyköping Western ===
| Location | Turnout | Share | Votes | S | M | FP | KD | V | C | MP | Other |
|---|---|---|---|---|---|---|---|---|---|---|---|
| Bergshammar | 85.0 | 6.8 | 742 | 46.5 | 16.2 | 10.9 | 8.4 | 4.9 | 8.5 | 3.8 | 0.9 |
| Centrum | 81.7 | 14.1 | 1,547 | 37.4 | 26.2 | 14.3 | 7.0 | 7.7 | 3.1 | 3.4 | 0.9 |
| Herrhagen | 78.0 | 9.9 | 1,080 | 52.6 | 11.8 | 9.4 | 8.0 | 10.1 | 4.4 | 3.4 | 0.4 |
| Högbrunn | 79.5 | 8.9 | 972 | 48.8 | 12.9 | 10.8 | 6.6 | 9.6 | 6.3 | 3.9 | 1.2 |
| Koppartorp | 84.8 | 4.1 | 450 | 47.1 | 9.1 | 10.9 | 7.8 | 8.7 | 11.2 | 3.8 | 1.3 |
| Lunda | 77.9 | 6.4 | 700 | 44.1 | 13.0 | 8.6 | 11.1 | 6.4 | 13.0 | 3.1 | 0.6 |
| Långsätter | 84.8 | 8.6 | 944 | 55.2 | 10.5 | 11.7 | 8.6 | 7.9 | 3.6 | 2.2 | 0.3 |
| Nävekvarn | 80.3 | 7.3 | 797 | 51.8 | 12.8 | 8.4 | 6.3 | 9.9 | 4.5 | 4.4 | 1.9 |
| Oppeby | 85.4 | 10.8 | 1,177 | 61.5 | 8.5 | 8.5 | 7.1 | 6.9 | 4.0 | 2.7 | 0.8 |
| Tuna | 86.7 | 8.4 | 921 | 49.7 | 13.4 | 10.4 | 7.3 | 6.1 | 8.5 | 3.5 | 1.2 |
| Väster | 78.5 | 14.0 | 1,533 | 38.0 | 19.3 | 14.7 | 11.5 | 7.0 | 4.6 | 3.9 | 0.8 |
| Postal vote | | 0.7 | 78 | | | | | | | | |
| Total | 84.3 | 35.7 | 10,941 | 47.6 | 15.1 | 11.2 | 8.2 | 7.8 | 5.8 | 3.5 | 0.9 |
Source: val.se
