= 1994 Nyköping municipal election =

Swedish local election

Nyköping Municipality in Sweden held a municipal election on 18 September 1994. The election was part of the local elections and held on the same day as the general election.

== Results ==
The number of seats remained at 61 with the Social Democrats winning the most at 34, a gain of eight from 1991, thus gaining an overall majority with around 53% of the vote. The number of valid ballots cast were 32,367.

Party	Votes	%	Seats	±
Social Democrats	17,140	53.0	34	+8
Moderates	5,912	18.3	12	-1
Centre Party	2,773	8.6	6	-1
People's Party	2,012	6.2	3	-2
Left Party	1,569	4.8	3	+1
Green Party	1,177	3.6	2	+2
Christian Democrats	953	2.9	1	-2
New Democracy	222	0.7	0	-4
Others	609	1.9	0	-1
Invalid/blank votes	583			
Total	32,950	100	61	0
Source: SCB

=== By constituency ===
Location	Turnout	Share	Votes	S	M	C	FP	V	MP	KDS	NyD	Other
Eastern (3nd)	87.8	33.0	10,683	47.9	22.1	9.4	7.6	3.8	3.7	3.6	0.7	1.1
Northern (1st)	86.0	30.0	9,702	59.4	12.7	7.8	4.7	5.5	3.5	2.4	0.7	3.3
Western (2nd)	88.0	37.0	11,982	52.2	19.3	8.5	6.2	5.2	3.6	2.9	0.6	1.4
Total	87.3	100.0	32,367	53.0	18.3	8.6	6.2	4.8	3.6	2.9	0.7	1.9
Source: SCB

== Urban and rural vote ==
=== Percentage points ===
Location	Share	Votes	S	M	C	FP	V	MP	KDS	NyD	Other
Nyköping	66.5	21,508	55.4	18.8	5.5	6.9	5.0	3.3	2.8	0.7	1.5
Rural vote	33.0	10,674	48.2	17.0	14.7	4.8	4.6	4.2	3.2	0.7	2.6
Postal vote	0.6	185									
Total	100.0	32,367	53.0	18.3	8.6	6.2	4.8	3.6	2.9	0.7	1.9
Source: val.se

=== By votes ===
Location	Share	Votes	S	M	C	FP	V	MP	KDS	NyD	Other
Nyköping	66.5	21,508	11,917	4,049	1,187	1,485	1,072	720	604	146	328
Rural vote	33.0	10,674	5,149	1,814	1,573	512	488	446	342	74	276
Postal vote	0.6	185	74	49	13	15	9	11	7	2	5
Total	100.0	32,367	17,140	5,912	2,773	2,012	1,569	1,177	953	222	609
Source: SCB

== Electoral wards ==
=== Nyköping ===
Location	#	Area	Share	Votes	S	M	C	FP	V	MP	KDS	NyD	Other
Alla Helgona	8	E	6.6	1,409	50.7	25.0	6.0	8.1	3.8	2.1	3.3	0.4	0.6
Brandholmen	16	E	5.1	1,093	58.4	18.2	6.2	5.9	3.4	3.8	2.6	0.8	0.6
Bryngelstorp	17	E	6.1	1,316	38.6	31.5	5.5	14.5	1.9	2.7	3.7	0.5	1.1
Centrum	1	W	7.1	1,519	38.4	36.1	4.5	8.4	4.9	3.5	2.2	0.7	1.3
Helgona		N	6.8	1,457	53.6	15.2	6.3	5.4	6.5	3.0	2.9	0.5	6.5
Herrhagen	6	W	4.1	883	58.6	16.0	4.3	7.5	7.1	3.5	2.0	0.3	0.7
Högbrunn	4	W	4.9	1,062	56.9	16.0	9.2	5.4	5.4	3.6	2.5	0.6	0.5
Isaksdal	10	N	6.7	1,440	58.6	13.9	5.5	6.8	6.2	4.0	2.3	0.9	1.9
Långsätter	5	W	4.8	1,032	55.2	17.5	4.7	7.8	6.3	4.9	2.1	0.4	1.0
Oppeby	7	W	5.8	1,251	66.0	11.3	5.6	4.4	4.6	3.0	2.2	0.5	2.6
Oppeby gård	3	N	3.2	680	70.6	5.7	4.7	3.4	5.4	5.3	2.4	0.4	2.1
Rosenkälla	14	E	5.7	1,227	56.7	18.8	5.3	6.7	4.8	2.9	2.8	1.5	0.6
Stenkulla	15	N	5.6	1,214	71.3	7.1	4.9	4.9	4.9	2.5	2.5	0.7	1.2
Väster	2	W	7.0	1,501	46.0	25.0	6.3	8.5	5.1	3.2	4.1	0.5	1.4
V Brandkärr	12	N	4.0	866	77.8	4.0	4.5	0.5	8.0	2.2	1.7	0.7	0.8
Öster	9	E	7.0	1,498	50.3	23.6	4.3	7.7	5.0	4.1	3.1	0.7	1.3
Östra Bergen	13	E	5.2	1,121	51.8	22.0	6.2	7.8	3.3	3.4	3.3	1.1	1.1
Ö Brandkärr	11	N	4.4	939	62.8	11.9	5.0	5.6	4.7	3.8	4.0	1.2	0.9
Total			100.0	21,508	55.4	18.8	5.5	6.9	5.0	3.3	2.8	0.7	1.5
Source: SCB

=== Rural areas ===
Location	Area	Share	Votes	S	M	C	FP	V	MP	KDS	NyD	Other
Bergshammar	W	7.6	815	44.9	19.6	14.4	6.6	4.3	3.3	4.5	0.5	1.8
Kila	W	7.7	817	49.4	19.6	14.4	2.8	3.5	5.8	3.2	0.6	1.0
Koppartorp	W	4.0	429	48.7	12.8	16.6	9.6	5.4	4.2	2.3	0.2	0.2
Ludgo	E	3.6	380	30.8	24.5	24.7	5.3	3.2	4.2	5.0	0.8	1.6
Lunda	W	6.9	740	50.0	13.1	18.9	3.0	5.7	3.4	3.6	1.1	1.2
Nävekvarn	W	7.8	837	63.6	11.5	6.0	3.5	7.0	3.0	3.0	1.9	0.6
Runtuna	E	5.6	597	36.3	19.4	22.3	4.9	4.9	5.2	5.5	0.3	1.2
Råby-Rönö	N	6.5	693	36.1	24.7	16.3	3.8	6.2	4.9	2.6	0.4	5.1
Stigtomta 1	N	8.6	921	59.1	13.8	7.2	6.7	4.1	2.3	1.2	0.2	5.4
Stigtomta 2	N	6.9	735	45.4	17.0	14.3	4.4	3.9	4.5	1.5	0.8	8.2
Svärta	E	5.3	563	46.5	16.5	16.3	5.2	5.5	5.5	2.5	0.4	1.6
Tuna	W	9.6	1,022	54.1	16.7	9.9	5.9	4.1	3.2	2.4	0.3	3.3
Tystberga	E	13.3	1,416	43.4	16.9	18.4	4.7	3.5	5.2	5.1	0.7	2.1
Vrena	N	6.6	709	53.2	15.5	16.4	2.5	3.7	4.5	2.0	1.3	1.0
Total		100.0	10,674	48.2	17.0	14.7	4.8	4.6	4.2	3.2	0.7	2.6
Source: SCB
