= Kilaån =

Coordinates: 58°44′N 17°01′E

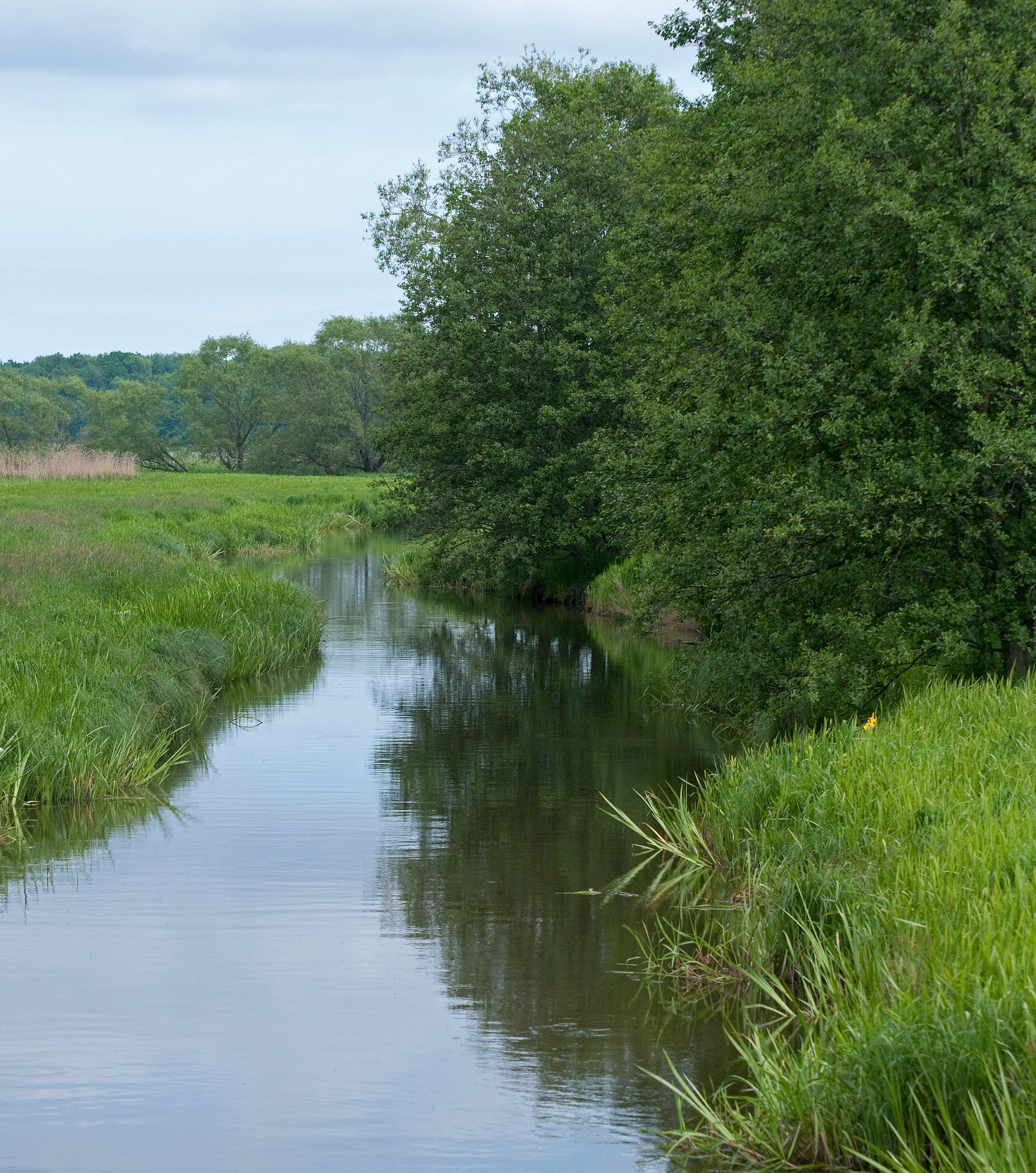

Location
- Country: Sweden
- Counties: Södermanland, Östergötland
- Municipalities: Norrköping, Nyköping

Physical characteristics
- Source: Vitsjön, Norrköping Municipality
  - elevation: 105 metres (344 ft)
- Mouth: Baltic Sea
  - location: Nyköping
  - elevation: 0 metres (0 ft)
- Length: 63 km (39 mi)
- Basin size: 432.2 km^{2} (166.9 sq mi)

Kilaån is a river primarily running through the southern parts of Södermanland County in Sweden. Its exodus is in south Nyköping on the Södermanland coast. The river's mouth is only a few hundred metres from the larger river of Nyköpingsån. The peninsula of Arnö and Oxelösund is reached by crossing the small river, being only a few metres wide. The river passes by the rural localities of Stavsjö, Jönåker and Bergshammar on its way through Nyköping Municipality to the shoreline. It forms a sizeable river valley called Kiladalen in the last 30 kilometres (19 mi) of its course, with elevated forests to its south and rolling hills to the north. The southern hills above the valley extend upwards of 100 metres (330 ft) above sea level. The river is also relatively flat from the beginning of said valley, with the confluence of the Ålberga and Vreta rivers into the main Kilaån being at merely 7 metres (23 ft) in spite of being at a distance from the river's mouth.
