= Södermanland Runic Inscription 49 =

Coordinates: 58.80537°N 16.70623°E

The Södermanland Runic Inscription 49 is a Viking Age runestone engraved in Old Norse with the Younger Futhark runic alphabet. The style of the runestone is a categorized as Fp. It is located in Ene in Nyköping Municipality.

== Inscription ==
þurþr : auk : tuki + raistu + stain + þansi + aftiʀ + bysiu ++ faþur sin ¤ han + uarþ tauþr : o kniri :
Þorðr {} ok {} Toki {} ræistu {} stæin {} þannsi {} æftiʀ {} Bysiu, {} faður sinn. {} Hann {} varð dauðr {} a knarri. {}
"Þórðr and Tóki raised this stone in memory of Bysja, their father. He died on the cargo-ship."
