= Buskhyttan =

- Location within Södermanland Location within Sweden
- Coordinates: 58°40′N 16°57′E
- Country: Sweden
- Province: Södermanland
- County: Södermanland County
- Municipality: Nyköping Municipality

Area
  - Total: 0.49 km^{2} (0.19 sq mi)

Population (31 December 2020)
  - Total: 208
  - Density: 458/km^{2} (1,190/sq mi)
- Time zone: UTC+1 (CET)
  - Summer (DST): UTC+2 (CEST)
- Climate: Cfb

Buskhyttan is a locality situated in Nyköping Municipality, Södermanland County, Sweden with 225 inhabitants in 2010.

== Elections ==
Buskhyttan belongs to the Koppartorp district, which comprises the rural eastern portion of Tunaberg. Unlike fellow Tunaberg district, less rural and more left-wing Nävekvarn, Koppartorp is more of a swing district between the traditional blocs.

=== Riksdag ===
Year	%	Votes	V	S	MP	C	L	KD	M	SD	ND	Other
1973	94.0	519	3.1	44.1		38.5	3.9	1.2	9.1			0.2
1976	94.6	437	3.0	38.7		41.6	4.1	2.5	9.8			0.2
1979	92.2	412	1.2	44.4		33.0	5.1	1.9	13.8			0.5
1982	92.7	414	2.7	44.4	1.9	32.1	3.4	1.9	13.5			0.0
1985	92.3	436	5.7	44.0	3.0	20.6	11.7		14.7			0.2
1988	89.3	436	5.0	44.7	6.7	21.8	7.6	2.1	11.7			0.5
1991	88.1	437	3.9	39.1	3.0	16.7	7.6	6.2	14.2		9.4	0.0
1994	90.7	435	4.6	48.3	5.7	17.0	3.7	3.7	15.6		0.2	1.1
1998	86.0	444	14.4	41.0	4.5	8.8	5.0	12.6	12.4			1.4
2002	85.6	457	7.2	46.4	5.5	11.8	10.9	8.8	7.4	1.1		0.9
2006	90.5	488	7.0	35.9	5.5	11.1	9.0	5.5	22.1	3.5		0.4
2010	89.9	507	5.9	30.6	6.3	13.2	9.5	5.7	23.3	5.3		0.2
2014	90.9	542	6.6	31.2	5.2	12.2	6.6	3.5	18.1	13.3		3.3
2018	91.7	545	6.6	29.5	5.5	14.3	4.2	5.7	15.6	18.2		0.4
