= Svärtaån =

Coordinates: 58°46′N 17°05′E

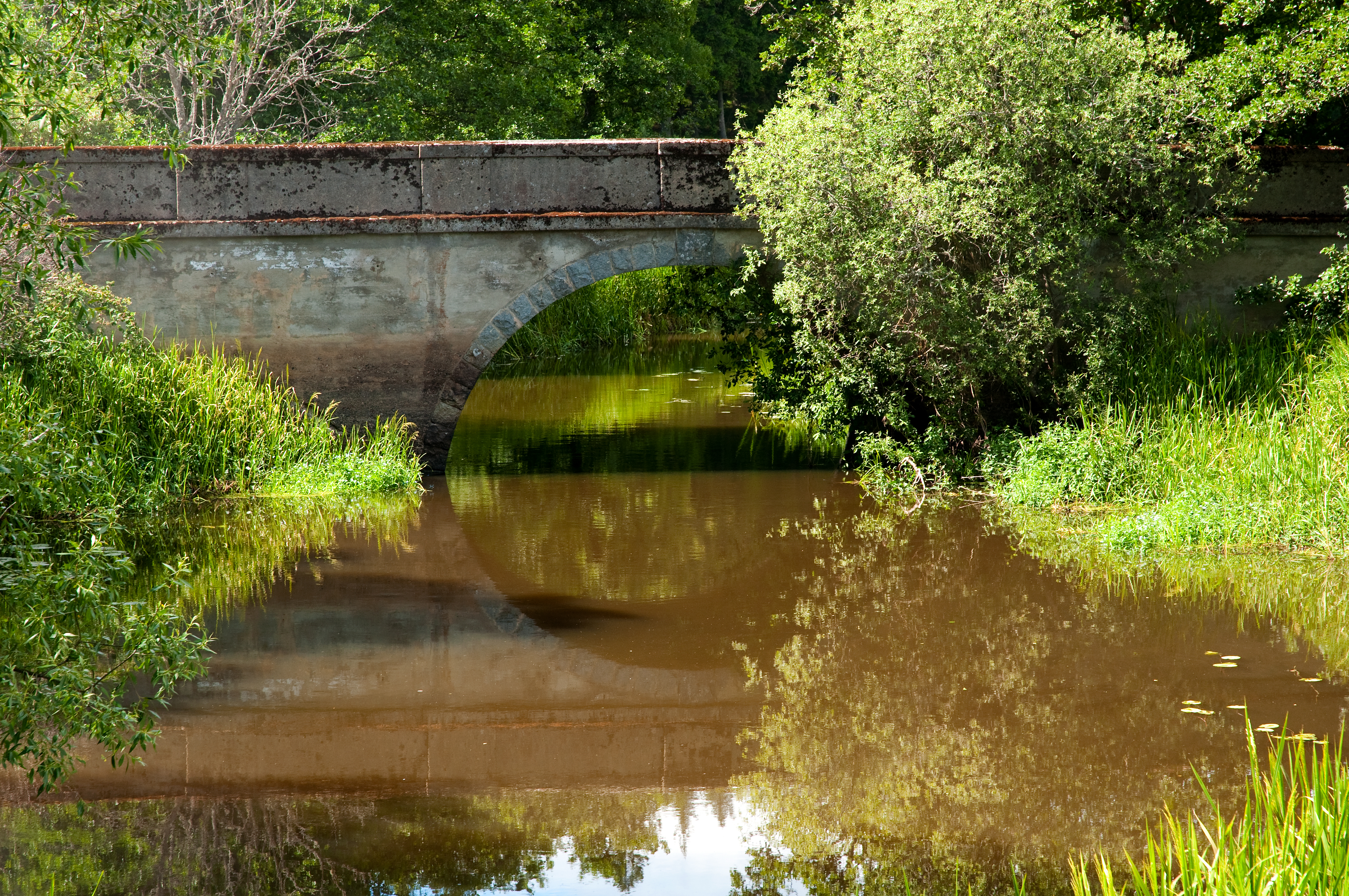

Location
- Country: Sweden
- County: Södermanland
- Municipality: Nyköping

Physical characteristics
- Length: 39 km (24 mi)
- Basin size: 372.0 km^{2} (143.6 sq mi)

Svärtaån is a river in the eastern parts of Nyköping Municipality in Södermanland, Sweden. The river drains into the Baltic Sea near the village of Sjösa and takes its name from the district of Svärta, which is predominantly runs through. The largest lake in the river system is Likstammen close to the source. The terrain in the area is low, but with many rolling hills and the river runs up well below 100 metres (330 ft) above sea level.
