= Svalsta =

- Location within Södermanland Location within Sweden
- Coordinates: 58°44′N 16°52′E
- Country: Sweden
- Province: Södermanland
- County: Södermanland County
- Municipality: Nyköping Municipality

Area
  - Total: 0.77 km^{2} (0.30 sq mi)

Population (31 December 2020)
  - Total: 1,111
  - Density: 1,400/km^{2} (3,700/sq mi)
- Time zone: UTC+1 (CET)
  - Summer (DST): UTC+2 (CEST)
- Climate: Cfb

Svalsta (local pronunciation Sválsta) is a locality situated in Nyköping Municipality, Södermanland County, Sweden with 1,078 inhabitants in 2010.
