= Nyköping Municipality =

Nyköping Municipality Nyköpings kommun
- Municipality
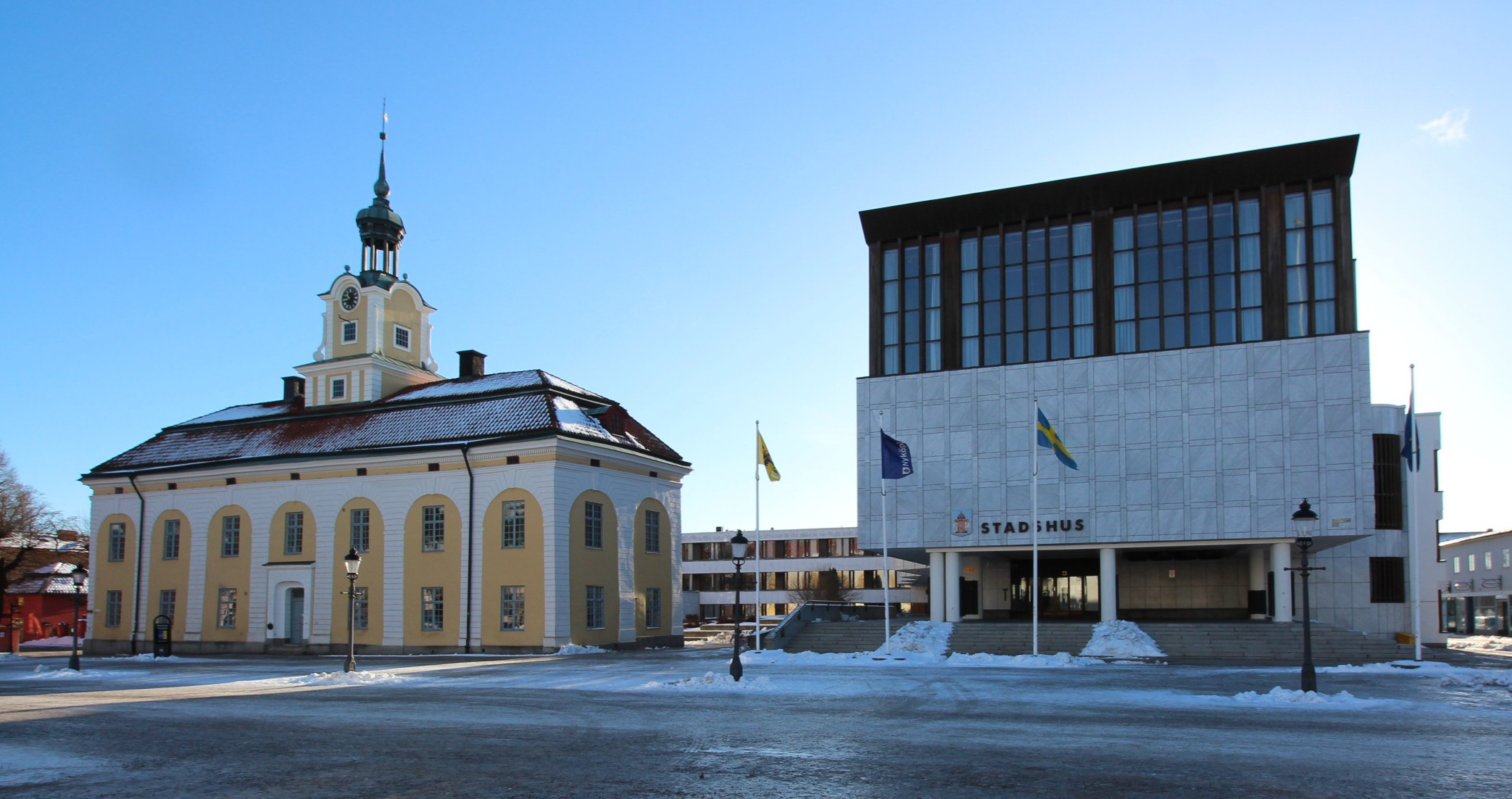
- Nyköping City Halls

- Flag Coat of arms

- Coordinates: 58°45′N 17°00′E
- Country: Sweden
- County: Södermanland County
- Seat: Nyköping

Area
  - Total: 2,066.41 km^{2} (797.85 sq mi)
  - Land: 1,420.84 km^{2} (548.59 sq mi)
  - Water: 645.57 km^{2} (249.26 sq mi)
- Area as of 1 January 2014.

Population (30 June 2025)
  - Total: 58,483
  - Density: 41.161/km^{2} (106.61/sq mi)
- Time zone: UTC+1 (CET)
  - Summer (DST): UTC+2 (CEST)
- ISO 3166 code: SE
- Province: Södermanland
- Municipal code: 0480
- Website: www.nykoping.se www.visitnykoping.se

Nyköping Municipality (Swedish: Nyköpings kommun) is a municipality in Södermanland County in southeast Sweden. Its seat is located in the city of Nyköping, which is containing a majority of the residents. Its southern tip in the district of Tunaberg is the southernmost point of mainland Svealand, one of the three original crowns forming Sweden. Nyköping is the administrative capital of Södermanland and hosts both the governors' residence and the regional council.

The municipality was created in 1971 with the amalgamation of the City of Nyköping and a great number of other municipalities. It was split up in three parts in 1992, when Gnesta Municipality and Trosa Municipality were created. The rural areas of the modern municipality is a merger between the historical rural districts of Jönåker in the west and Rönö in the east. The northwestern part of the Jönåker hundred was replaced by the southeastern part of Oppunda. The village of Jönåker itself became part of the municipality as a result of the mergers. Politically, Nyköping is historically dominated by the Social Democrats, although margins between the coalitions have been closer in some recent elections. Employment has transformed from industry to more of a commuter and service town in recent decades.

Nyköping itself is on a wide inlet and has a seasonal tourist port that often freezes in winter. The rural and rugged coastline is a distinct feature of the municipality. The local climate has four distinct seasons. Snow cover in winter is variable and by contrast, especially seaside summer nights are warm by Nordic standards. Nyköpingsån is the largest river running through the municipality, with its basin forming a lake district around the village of Vrena in the north with the lakes of Yngaren and Långhalsen dominating the landscape. The largest lake of the drainage basin is Båven somewhat further east. Kilaån and Svärtaån are the other sizeable river systems draining into the Baltic Sea within the municipality.

In the rural part of the municipality, the majority live in the many inland villages where Stigtomta is the largest. There are also several villages of the Kila valley to the west of town, with a total of about 4,400 people in the three districts following the lowest course of the river. Elsewhere, the municipality is sparsely populated. Tystberga is the main village of the rural eastern parts and Nävekvarn the main settlement of the southern coast, with both being in relative isolation.

== Geography ==
The following localities are large enough as in having more than 200 inhabitants to qualify under the Swedish definition of a locality. Many of these localities are former seats of rural municipalities.

- Nyköping (seat)
- Arnö (part of the Nyköping urban area)
- Bergshammar
- Buskhyttan
- Enstaberga
- Jönåker
- Nävekvarn
- Runtuna
- Sjösa
- Stavsjö
- Stigtomta
- Svalsta
- Vrena
- Tystberga
- Ålberga

Of those, only Buskhyttan, Nävekvarn and Sjösa are either onshore or near-coastal settlements, the rest being in the municipality's interior. Nävekvarn is the only other settlement than Nyköping to maintain a harbour and a seaside environment.

In addition there are numerous smaller settlements not large enough to meet the classification. The most significant of those are Aspa, Bränn-Ekeby, Koppartorp, Lappetorp, Lid, Lästringe, Ripsa, Råby and Svärta. Seaside mixed residence/holiday home areas also include Helgö, Horn, Hummelvik, Skeppsvik, Svärdsklova, Uttervik, Vålarö and Örstig.

The western area of the rural part of the municipality is more densely populated than the eastern side, with Stigtomta and the tri-village conurbation of Bergshammar, Svalsta and Enstaberga being located on that side. Skavsta Airport is also located in this section of the municipality. In 2018, there were 8,699 Swedish citizens of voting age registered in rural electoral wards set west of National Road 53 that goes roughly through the centre of the municipality compared to only 4,362 east of the road. This meant that 2/3 of the rural populace was in the western portion of the municipality.

The majority of residents, however, are living in Nyköping's urban area.

=== Bodies of water ===
Nyköping Municipality has a vast coastline on the Baltic Sea and several freshwater bodies. The two largest lakes are Yngaren and Båven, both connected to the sea through Nyköpingsån, a narrow river passing through Nyköping, entering through the lake of Långhalsen some 10 kilometres (6.2 mi) north of town.

== Demographics ==
This is a demographic table based on Nyköping Municipality's electoral districts in the 2022 Swedish general election sourced from SVT's election platform, in turn taken from SCB official statistics.

In total 57,507 people were residents, including 43,569 Swedish citizens of voting age. 50.6% voted for the left coalition and 48.1% for the right coalition. Of the 37 electoral districts, the median values were 82% employment, 85% Swedish background with 15% foreign background, a median income of 25,988 kronor and a college degree rate of 36%. With some of the largest districts having on average lower income, less employment, fewer college degree recipients and more people of foreign background, the averages would vary from said means. Indicators are in percentage points except population totals and income.

| Location | Residents | Citizen adults | Left vote | Right vote | Employed | Swedish parents | Foreign heritage | Income SEK | Degree |
| Location | | | % | % | | | | | |
|---|---|---|---|---|---|---|---|---|---|
| Alla Helgona | 1,739 | 1,437 | 49.3 | 49.8 | 71 | 78 | 22 | 24,023 | 35 |
| Arnö Herrhagen | 1,940 | 1,414 | 61.9 | 36.6 | 69 | 57 | 43 | 21,848 | 34 |
| Arnö Långsätter | 1,526 | 1,054 | 56.6 | 42.2 | 87 | 82 | 18 | 29,552 | 43 |
| Bergshammar | 1,515 | 1,075 | 44.9 | 53.2 | 87 | 87 | 13 | 30,002 | 43 |
| Brandholmen | 1,970 | 1,661 | 45.7 | 53.5 | 82 | 83 | 17 | 29,354 | 44 |
| Bryngelstorp | 1,585 | 1,185 | 51.3 | 48.5 | 91 | 92 | 8 | 31,718 | 56 |
| Centrum | 1,525 | 1,363 | 49.9 | 48.1 | 77 | 72 | 28 | 25,928 | 39 |
| Ekensberg | 1,234 | 860 | 54.5 | 42.0 | 69 | 51 | 49 | 20,778 | 34 |
| Hagalund | 1,475 | 1,043 | 53.0 | 46.6 | 82 | 88 | 12 | 27,516 | 43 |
| Helgona | 1,467 | 1,037 | 44.5 | 54.7 | 85 | 86 | 14 | 30,064 | 42 |
| Högbrunn | 1,558 | 1,301 | 51.3 | 47.7 | 81 | 86 | 14 | 27,139 | 36 |
| Isaksdal | 2,022 | 1,462 | 54.4 | 43.9 | 76 | 70 | 30 | 23,340 | 39 |
| Kila | 1,306 | 1,006 | 43.7 | 55.6 | 86 | 90 | 10 | 26,136 | 33 |
| Koppartorp | 717 | 594 | 55.1 | 44.9 | 86 | 92 | 8 | 26,787 | 34 |
| Lunda | 1,216 | 941 | 40.9 | 57.8 | 84 | 92 | 8 | 24,979 | 27 |
| Nicolai | 1,042 | 893 | 51.9 | 46.4 | 79 | 83 | 17 | 25,932 | 40 |
| Nävekvarn | 1,077 | 898 | 51.7 | 48.1 | 76 | 87 | 13 | 22,778 | 32 |
| Oppeby | 1,583 | 1,269 | 53.1 | 45.9 | 83 | 86 | 14 | 26,228 | 41 |
| Oppeby gård | 1,562 | 1,299 | 52.2 | 45.7 | 75 | 79 | 21 | 20,406 | 32 |
| Rosenhill | 1,829 | 1,225 | 48.4 | 50.8 | 90 | 84 | 16 | 33,790 | 57 |
| Rosenkälla | 1,631 | 1,210 | 58.2 | 40.3 | 78 | 77 | 23 | 23,396 | 40 |
| Runtuna | 1,439 | 1,118 | 42.7 | 56.3 | 84 | 90 | 10 | 25,799 | 36 |
| Råby-Ripsa | 692 | 543 | 43.6 | 55.3 | 88 | 93 | 7 | 27,544 | 34 |
| Stadsfjärden | 1,872 | 1,495 | 48.0 | 51.1 | 79 | 77 | 23 | 26,599 | 45 |
| Stenkulla | 2,123 | 1,566 | 51.2 | 46.7 | 75 | 66 | 34 | 22,844 | 35 |
| Stigtomta C | 1,387 | 983 | 47.2 | 51.4 | 88 | 92 | 8 | 28,772 | 34 |
| Stigtomta Ytter | 1,580 | 1,184 | 43.8 | 55.7 | 87 | 93 | 7 | 27,361 | 35 |
| Svärta | 1,503 | 1,133 | 44.0 | 55.6 | 88 | 90 | 10 | 29,561 | 43 |
| Tuna | 1,645 | 1,156 | 49.0 | 50.2 | 87 | 87 | 13 | 28,940 | 35 |
| Tystberga | 2,120 | 1,590 | 46.8 | 51.8 | 83 | 84 | 16 | 25,988 | 29 |
| Vrena | 1,159 | 954 | 44.8 | 53.6 | 83 | 89 | 11 | 24,908 | 32 |
| Väster | 1,181 | 994 | 49.7 | 48.8 | 78 | 80 | 20 | 25,245 | 42 |
| Västra Brandkärr | 1,687 | 1,179 | 67.6 | 30.3 | 52 | 45 | 55 | 16,305 | 19 |
| Ängstugan | 1,538 | 1,268 | 57.9 | 41.7 | 82 | 85 | 15 | 24,329 | 38 |
| Öster | 1,969 | 1,661 | 51.4 | 47.7 | 84 | 81 | 19 | 26,202 | 38 |
| Östra Bergen | 1,639 | 1,401 | 49.6 | 48.9 | 81 | 85 | 15 | 25,981 | 42 |
| Östra Brandkärr | 2,454 | 1,117 | 69.7 | 26.1 | 53 | 28 | 72 | 14,699 | 23 |
Source: SVT

== Industry ==
The municipality has 3,000 companies but more than 50% are sole traders. Only 80 have more than 25 employees; of those 33 have more than 50 employees.

A former military airfield in the municipality serves now as a civilian airport called Stockholm-Skavsta Airport.

== Education ==
Nyköping is the site of the Nyköpings Gymnasium, formerly consisting of two schools: Gripen and Tessin as well as a smaller one located within the Stockholm-Skavsta Airport. Tessin was a high school noted for the strength of its curricula in humanities, arts, and social studies. Gripen was instead noted for the science and technical programs. The merger between the two organizations eventually led to an expanded Gripen being the sole public high school in the municipality.

== Tourist attraction ==
Nyköpingshus, a medieval castle, draws many thousands of tourists yearly, especially for its summer outdoor play, Nyköpings gästabud, dramatizing 14th-century events in which king Birger Magnusson and Queen Märta invited his two brothers Valdemar and Erik to the castle, ostensibly for a banquet of reconciliation after a civil war in which Valdemar and Erik had once imprisoned Birger. During the banquet at Nyköpingshus, Birger arrested Valdemar and Erik and committed them to the dungeon, where, according to legend, they starved to death. Shortly thereafter supporters of Valdemar and Erik forced Birger and Märta to flee to Denmark.

== Elections ==
=== Municipal elections ===
- 1973
- 1976
- 1979
- 1982
- 1985
- 1988
- 1991
- 1994
- 1998
- 2002
- 2006
- 2010
- 2014
- 2018

=== Riksdag elections ===
Only parties that have won representation during this timeframe are listed in results.

Sweden Democrats have their results from 1988 to 1998 listed as "0.0" even though those were decimals higher, since the SCB did not publish those results in detail at a municipal level since the party was not in realistic contention to enter the Riksdag. From 1991 Trosa Municipality and Gnesta Municipality had separate elections rending significant boundary changes.

Overall results
| Year | Turnout | Votes | V | S | MP | C | L | KD | M | SD | NyD | Left | Right |
|---|---|---|---|---|---|---|---|---|---|---|---|---|---|
| 1973 | 92.5 | 38,826 | 3.2 | 49.0 | | 26.5 | 6.6 | 2.0 | 12.4 | | | 52.2 | 45.4 |
| 1976 | 93.3 | 42,083 | 2.9 | 47.5 | | 24.5 | 9.3 | 1.5 | 13.9 | | | 50.4 | 47.7 |
| 1979 | 92.4 | 42,594 | 3.7 | 48.5 | | 18.6 | 9.1 | 1.5 | 18.1 | | | 52.2 | 45.9 |
| 1982 | 92.8 | 43,665 | 3.9 | 49.1 | 1.8 | 16.7 | 4.8 | 1.6 | 22.0 | | | 53.0 | 43.4 |
| 1985 | 91.2 | 43,865 | 3.7 | 47.7 | 1.8 | 12.9 | 13.0 | | 20.7 | | | 51.3 | 46.7 |
| 1988 | 87.8 | 42,503 | 4.4 | 46.1 | 5.7 | 11.9 | 11.3 | 2.3 | 17.9 | | | 56.2 | 41.1 |
| 1991 | 89.5 | 32,093 | 3.4 | 42.5 | 2.8 | 9.0 | 8.2 | 6.6 | 19.5 | | 7.3 | 45.9 | 43.4 |
| 1994 | 88.8 | 32,570 | 5.1 | 51.2 | 4.5 | 7.5 | 6.4 | 3.9 | 19.7 | | 0.7 | 60.7 | 37.6 |
| 1998 | 83.7 | 30,627 | 10.6 | 43.2 | 4.1 | 5.5 | 4.0 | 12.3 | 18.8 | | | 57.9 | 40.6 |
| 2002 | 82.7 | 30,854 | 7.3 | 47.4 | 4.3 | 5.9 | 11.2 | 9.3 | 12.9 | 0.8 | | 59.1 | 39.6 |
| 2006 | 84.1 | 31,922 | 4.8 | 40.4 | 5.2 | 7.3 | 6.7 | 7.6 | 23.6 | 2.4 | | 50.4 | 45.2 |
| 2010 | 85.7 | 33,999 | 4.8 | 34.4 | 8.2 | 6.0 | 7.0 | 5.4 | 27.9 | 5.3 | | 47.3 | 46.3 |
| 2014 | 87.4 | 35,684 | 4.8 | 34.0 | 7.5 | 6.0 | 4.5 | 4.4 | 23.0 | 12.6 | | 46.3 | 37.9 |
| 2018 | 88.7 | 36,687 | 6.4 | 32.0 | 4.5 | 8.5 | 4.5 | 6.4 | 20.1 | 16.1 | | 51.4 | 47.1 |

Rural results by current borders
| Year | % | Votes | V | S | MP | C | L | KD | M | SD | NyD | Other |
|---|---|---|---|---|---|---|---|---|---|---|---|---|
| 1973 | 92.7 | 9,668 | 2.4 | 44.0 | | 35.6 | 4.7 | 2.2 | 10.9 | | | 0.2 |
| 1976 | 93.8 | 10,047 | 1.6 | 43.2 | | 33.8 | 7.2 | 1.5 | 12.6 | | | 0.2 |
| 1979 | 92.8 | 10,318 | 2.5 | 44.3 | | 27.4 | 7.5 | 1.4 | 16.5 | | | 0.5 |
| 1982 | 93.3 | 10,475 | 2.5 | 45.5 | 1.7 | 25.1 | 4.1 | 1.9 | 19.3 | | | 0.1 |
| 1985 | 91.9 | 10,472 | 2.8 | 43.9 | 2.0 | 21.0 | 11.5 | | 18.6 | | | 0.1 |
| 1988 | 89.1 | 10,183 | 3.7 | 43.6 | 5.9 | 19.1 | 8.7 | 2.6 | 16.3 | | | 0.2 |
| 1991 | 89.5 | 10,535 | 3.0 | 38.6 | 3.2 | 15.4 | 6.5 | 6.9 | 17.5 | | 8.5 | 0.4 |
| 1994 | 89.3 | 10,663 | 5.1 | 47.6 | 5.0 | 13.4 | 5.0 | 4.3 | 17.7 | | 0.8 | 1.2 |
| 1998 | 84.4 | 10,166 | 10.5 | 40.7 | 4.6 | 9.6 | 2.7 | 13.4 | 17.5 | | | 1.1 |
| 2002 | 83.7 | 10,143 | 6.8 | 44.7 | 4.8 | 10.8 | 9.0 | 10.1 | 12.5 | 0.8 | | 0.5 |
| 2006 | 85.5 | 10,563 | 4.8 | 37.1 | 5.0 | 11.7 | 5.4 | 7.7 | 23.1 | 3.3 | | 1.9 |
| 2010 | 86.9 | 11,074 | 5.1 | 31.4 | 7.1 | 9.5 | 6.0 | 5.2 | 28.3 | 6.1 | | 1.2 |
| 2014 | 88.0 | 11,268 | 4.9 | 31.2 | 6.3 | 9.3 | 3.5 | 4.2 | 21.9 | 15.5 | | 3.2 |
| 2018 | 88.7 | 11,477 | 6.0 | 28.5 | 4.0 | 10.8 | 3.2 | 6.8 | 18.4 | 20.8 | | 1.6 |

== See also ==
- Nävsjön
