= Enstaberga =

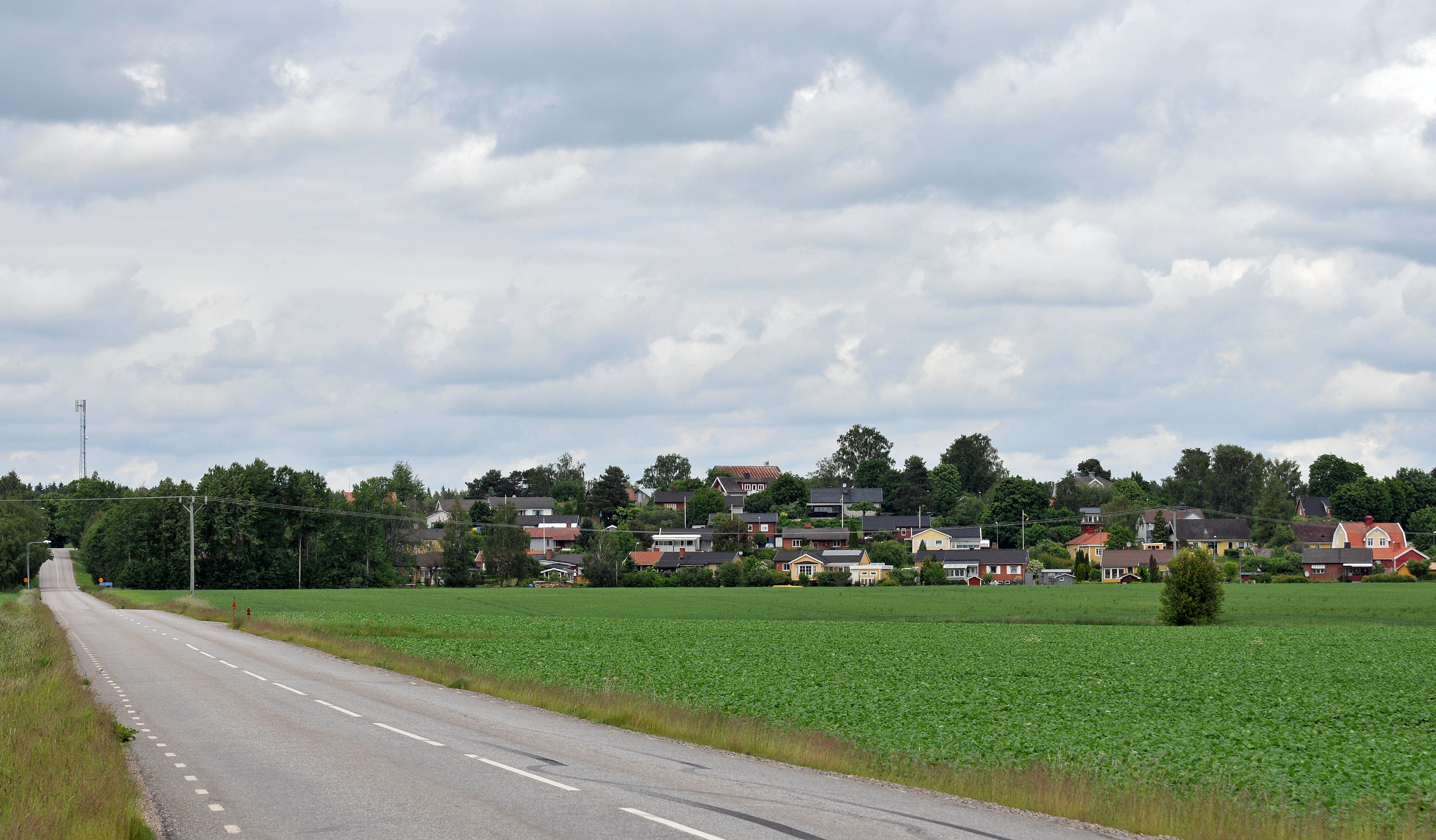

- Location within Södermanland Location within Sweden
- Coordinates: 58°45′N 16°51′E
- Country: Sweden
- Province: Södermanland
- County: Södermanland County
- Municipality: Nyköping Municipality

Area
  - Total: 0.59 km^{2} (0.23 sq mi)

Population (31 December 2020)
  - Total: 441
  - Density: 750/km^{2} (1,900/sq mi)
- Time zone: UTC+1 (CET)
  - Summer (DST): UTC+2 (CEST)
- Climate: Cfb

Enstaberga (local pronunciation Énstabärja) is a locality in Nyköping Municipality, Södermanland County, Sweden, with 430 inhabitants in 2010. It is about 10 kilometres (6.2 mi) west of downtown Nyköping on the Tuna plain, in the Kila Valley.

Enstaberga is located close to the locality of Svalsta, to which there is a floodlit road with a cycling path alongside over a field of a few hundred metres. It also features a floodlit cycling path that extends to Nyköping, passing through the village of Bergshammar 4 kilometres (2.5 mi) to its east, with the three forming a wider agglomeration of between 2,000 and 3,000 people.
