= Tunaberg =

Tunaberg is a district that is a former parish and municipality in the southern portion of Nyköping Municipality, Södermanland County, Sweden. It has the southernmost mainland point of Svealand, the middle of the three lands of Sweden.

Its largest settlement is the seaside locality of Nävekvarn, a historical industrial settlement that also holds a natural harbour, about 23 kilometres (14 mi) from the Nyköping town centre. This is also where the sole grocery store of the district is located. There is a forested geography in the district with a rocky coastline. Its largest lake is Nävsjön right on the Östergötland border. Alongside it a few kilometres eastward, there are several reservoirs around Gälkhyttan, near the border to the Tuna district to the north.

In the east of the district there is a bay where Tunaberg is near Oxelösund across the water. This part is more agrarian with farmlands surrounding the second largest settlement of Buskhyttan. The church that bears the name of the district, the Tunaberg Church is located in the small settlement of Koppartorp on the old and smaller road between the two main settlements. The modern road instead goes straight through the rural parts between Nyköping and Nävekvarn.

== Settlements ==
- Buskhyttan
- Koppartorp
- Nävekvarn

=== Minor settlements ===
- Frankhyttan
- Gälkhyttan
- Hummelvik
- Kovik
- Pumptorp
- Skeppsvik
- Uttervik

== Notable people ==
- Carl Peter Thunberg 1743–1828), naturalist, died in Tunaberg

== See also ==
- Bråviken
- Nävsjön
- Tunaberg Church

== National elections ==
Tunaberg used to be a single municipality but have since the merger into Nyköping Municipality in the early 1970s been divided into two separate electoral districts: Koppartorp and Nävekvarn covering the eastern and western parts respectively. Due to the historical industrial and agrarian split of the district, Nävekvarn has been a consistent left-wing electoral district, whereas Koppartorp generally has been a swing district between both blocs depending on nationwide trends.

=== Koppartorp ===
| Year | % | Votes | V | S | MP | C | L | KD | M | SD | ND | Other |
|---|---|---|---|---|---|---|---|---|---|---|---|---|
| 1973 | 94.0 | 519 | 3.1 | 44.1 | | 38.5 | 3.9 | 1.2 | 9.1 | | | 0.2 |
| 1976 | 94.6 | 437 | 3.0 | 38.7 | | 41.6 | 4.1 | 2.5 | 9.8 | | | 0.2 |
| 1979 | 92.2 | 412 | 1.2 | 44.4 | | 33.0 | 5.1 | 1.9 | 13.8 | | | 0.5 |
| 1982 | 92.7 | 414 | 2.7 | 44.4 | 1.9 | 32.1 | 3.4 | 1.9 | 13.5 | | | 0.0 |
| 1985 | 92.3 | 436 | 5.7 | 44.0 | 3.0 | 20.6 | 11.7 | | 14.7 | | | 0.2 |
| 1988 | 89.3 | 436 | 5.0 | 44.7 | 6.7 | 21.8 | 7.6 | 2.1 | 11.7 | | | 0.5 |
| 1991 | 88.1 | 437 | 3.9 | 39.1 | 3.0 | 16.7 | 7.6 | 6.2 | 14.2 | | 9.4 | 0.0 |
| 1994 | 90.7 | 435 | 4.6 | 48.3 | 5.7 | 17.0 | 3.7 | 3.7 | 15.6 | | 0.2 | 1.1 |
| 1998 | 86.0 | 444 | 14.4 | 41.0 | 4.5 | 8.8 | 5.0 | 12.6 | 12.4 | | | 1.4 |
| 2002 | 85.6 | 457 | 7.2 | 46.4 | 5.5 | 11.8 | 10.9 | 8.8 | 7.4 | 1.1 | | 0.9 |
| 2006 | 90.5 | 488 | 7.0 | 35.9 | 5.5 | 11.1 | 9.0 | 5.5 | 22.1 | 3.5 | | 0.4 |
| 2010 | 89.9 | 507 | 5.9 | 30.6 | 6.3 | 13.2 | 9.5 | 5.7 | 23.3 | 5.3 | | 0.2 |
| 2014 | 90.9 | 542 | 6.6 | 31.2 | 5.2 | 12.2 | 6.6 | 3.5 | 18.1 | 13.3 | | 3.3 |
| 2018 | 91.7 | 545 | 6.6 | 29.5 | 5.5 | 14.3 | 4.2 | 5.7 | 15.6 | 18.2 | | 0.4 |

=== Nävekvarn ===
| Year | % | Votes | V | S | MP | C | L | KD | M | SD | NyD | Left | Right |
|---|---|---|---|---|---|---|---|---|---|---|---|---|---|
| 1973 | 93.7 | 648 | 6.0 | 70.8 | | 12.3 | 4.6 | 1.1 | 5.2 | | | 76.9 | 21.9 |
| 1976 | 93.4 | 746 | 3.2 | 66.5 | | 18.0 | 3.6 | 0.7 | 7.8 | | | 69.7 | 29.4 |
| 1979 | 91.2 | 799 | 4.3 | 65.1 | | 14.9 | 4.0 | 0.6 | 10.5 | | | 69.3 | 29.4 |
| 1982 | 91.5 | 841 | 4.8 | 68.3 | 1.7 | 10.4 | 2.7 | 1.1 | 10.9 | | | 73.0 | 24.1 |
| 1985 | 91.1 | 843 | 4.7 | 65.6 | 1.9 | 9.4 | 8.5 | | 9.8 | | | 70.3 | 27.8 |
| 1988 | 87.6 | 773 | 5.6 | 63.4 | 6.9 | 4.9 | 6.0 | 2.8 | 10.1 | | | 75.8 | 21.0 |
| 1991 | 87.4 | 817 | 5.3 | 54.2 | 4.7 | 6.9 | 3.7 | 5.5 | 12.0 | | 7.6 | 59.5 | 28.0 |
| 1994 | 88.9 | 833 | 8.0 | 62.4 | 3.5 | 4.7 | 2.9 | 4.1 | 12.5 | | 1.4 | 71.9 | 24.1 |
| 1998 | 82.1 | 779 | 14.0 | 52.6 | 3.6 | 4.4 | 1.3 | 10.1 | 11.9 | | | 70.2 | 27.7 |
| 2002 | 80.0 | 784 | 11.5 | 52.0 | 5.6 | 4.7 | 6.7 | 6.7 | 10.8 | 1.5 | | 69.1 | 28.8 |
| 2006 | 86.1 | 860 | 6.4 | 48.0 | 5.1 | 7.2 | 4.7 | 7.3 | 16.3 | 3.0 | | 59.5 | 35.5 |
| 2010 | 85.7 | 857 | 6.9 | 38.6 | 7.8 | 5.5 | 5.1 | 4.3 | 24.5 | 6.5 | | 53.3 | 39.4 |
| 2014 | 87.2 | 831 | 7.2 | 40.0 | 7.0 | 5.5 | 2.1 | 3.7 | 16.1 | 16.3 | | 54.2 | 27.4 |
| 2018 | 87.2 | 775 | 7.0 | 36.0 | 4.3 | 7.4 | 1.7 | 5.7 | 14.1 | 22.2 | | 54.6 | 43.6 |
| 2022 | 84.0 | 746 | 6.6 | 35.1 | 5.8 | 4.3 | 2.9 | 6.3 | 13.8 | 25.1 | | 51.7 | 48.1 |
