= Stigtomta =

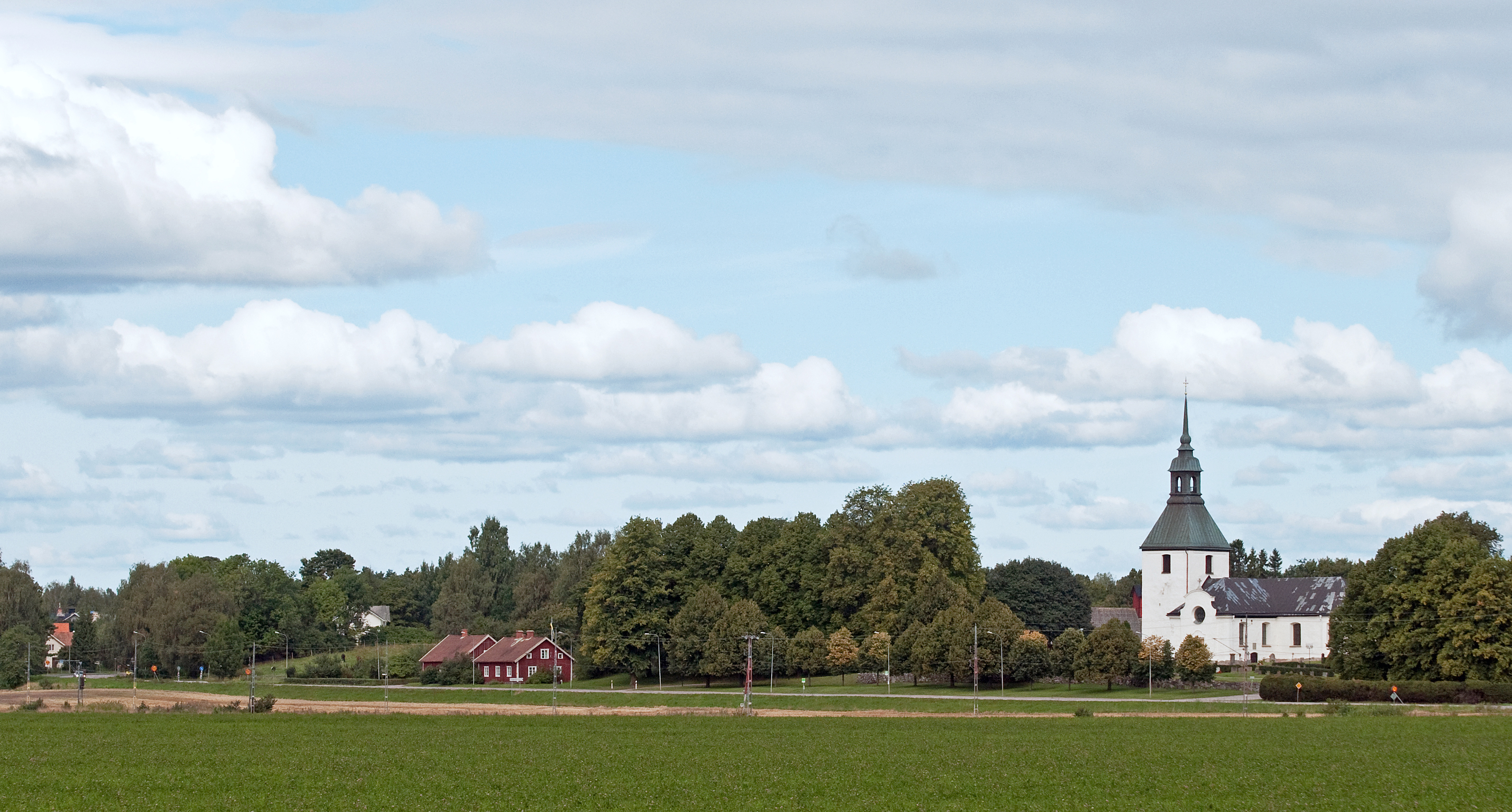
- Stigtoma urban area in Nyköping municipality

- Location within Södermanland Location within Sweden
- Coordinates: 58°48′N 16°47′E
- Country: Sweden
- Province: Södermanland
- County: Södermanland County
- Municipality: Nyköping Municipality

Area
  - Total: 1.79 km^{2} (0.69 sq mi)

Population (31 December 2020)
  - Total: 1,914
  - Density: 1,070/km^{2} (2,770/sq mi)
- Time zone: UTC+1 (CET)
  - Summer (DST): UTC+2 (CEST)
- Climate: Cfb

Stigtomta is a locality situated in Nyköping Municipality, Södermanland County, Sweden with 1,942 inhabitants in 2010. It is located around 15 kilometres outside the city centre of Nyköping.

== Riksdag elections ==
Year	%	Votes	V	S	MP	C	L	KD	M	SD	NyD	Left	Right
1973	93.2	1,383	2.5	41.3		37.1	5.7	1.6	11.8			43.7	54.6
1976	94.4	1,564	2.1	44.1		29.5	10.5	0.7	12.9			46.2	52.8
1979	94.5	1,565	2.7	46.3		22.4	10.7	0.4	16.4			49.0	49.5
1982	94.4	1,601	2.9	48.7	2.1	21.0	4.9	0.7	19.6			51.6	45.5
1985	92.6	1,615	2.7	46.5	2.2	13.9	16.0		18.7			49.2	48.6
1988	89.7	1,574	3.6	48.4	3.9	15.4	12.0	1.1	15.2			55.8	42.7
1991	90.4	1,627	3.5	43.6	2.6	12.0	8.2	4.4	17.5		7.9	47.1	42.2
1994	90.2	1,659	4.5	53.3	4.4	9.8	7.4	2.5	16.5		0.8	62.3	36.1
1998	84.9	1,767	9.7	44.5	4.6	8.0	2.9	12.1	17.5			58.9	40.5
2002	85.0	1,786	5.7	50.3	4.4	8.8	9.1	8.9	11.9	0.6		60.3	38.7
2006	86.2	1,809	4.9	40.7	4.3	11.3	5.1	6.0	22.6	3.2		49.9	44.9
2010	88.6	1,886	5.2	35.5	6.6	8.3	6.8	4.4	26.1	6.1		47.3	45.7
2014	90.4	1,900	4.4	34.5	6.1	8.3	3.8	3.7	21.2	15.0		45.1	37.1
2018	90.2	1,919	5.8	30.6	4.5	8.7	3.6	6.3	19.6	19.5		49.7	49.0
