= Ålberga =

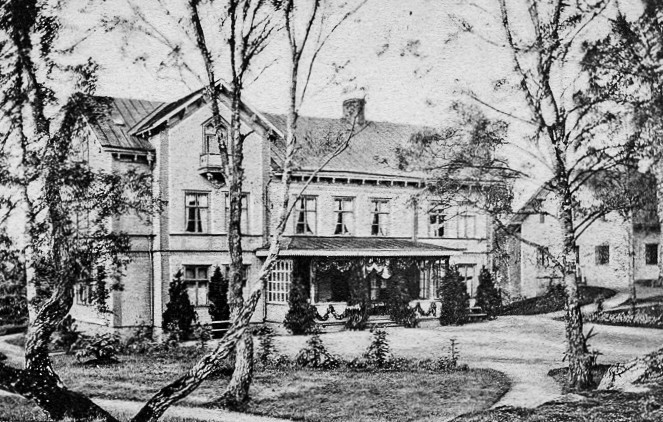
- Ålberga gård

- Location within Södermanland Location within Sweden
- Coordinates: 58°44′N 16°34′E
- Country: Sweden
- Province: Södermanland
- County: Södermanland County
- Municipality: Nyköping Municipality

Area
  - Total: 0.45 km^{2} (0.17 sq mi)

Population (31 December 2020)
  - Total: 219
  - Density: 490/km^{2} (1,300/sq mi)
- Time zone: UTC+1 (CET)
  - Summer (DST): UTC+2 (CEST)
- Climate: Dfb

Ålberga (local pronunciation Ålbärja) is a locality situated in Nyköping Municipality, Södermanland County, Sweden with 247 inhabitants in 2010.

== Elections ==
Ålberga and Stavsjö are the two main settlements of the Kila electoral ward.

=== Riksdag ===
Year	%	Votes	V	S	MP	C	L	KD	M	SD	NyD	Other	Left	Right
1973	88.2	724	1.8	51.8		28.7	4.3	2.9	10.4			0.1	53.6	43.4
1976	92.0	727	1.0	50.3		29.3	5.1	3.6	10.6			0.1	51.3	45.0
1979	90.2	722	2.6	48.3		26.2	6.4	1.4	15.0			0.1	51.0	47.5
1982	92.4	790	2.0	48.9	1.8	22.9	2.9	1.6	19.9			0.0	50.9	45.7
1985	91.7	817	2.8	46.1	2.1	20.9	8.4		19.3			0.2	49.0	48.7
1988	85.3	767	4.0	44.7	7.3	19.9	5.2	2.3	16.0			0.4	56.1	41.2
1991	87.6	837	2.3	39.1	3.3	14.1	4.5	7.0	19.1		9.9	0.6	41.3	44.8
1994	87.0	824	4.4	48.8	6.4	11.4	2.8	4.0	19.8		0.8	1.6	59.6	38.0
1998	82.4	785	7.1	39.6	7.4	8.9	1.4	12.7	20.4			2.4	54.1	43.4
2002	80.1	745	6.0	40.0	5.5	10.1	7.1	14.4	15.3	1.2		0.4	51.5	46.8
2006	83.1	782	4.0	34.4	6.0	11.6	3.7	7.0	26.5	5.1		1.7	44.4	48.8
2010	84.8	806	5.2	31.9	6.6	9.6	4.8	5.7	28.9	5.7		1.6	43.7	49.0
2014	84.5	832	6.4	26.8	5.3	10.2	2.9	4.6	22.4	17.3		4.2	38.5	40.0
2018	86.9	857	6.2	25.4	3.4	12.6	3.0	6.7	17.4	23.5		1.9	47.6	50.5
2022	86.8	863	4.6	27.0	4.2	7.9	2.8	5.8	18.0	29.1			43.7	55.6
