= Tystberga =

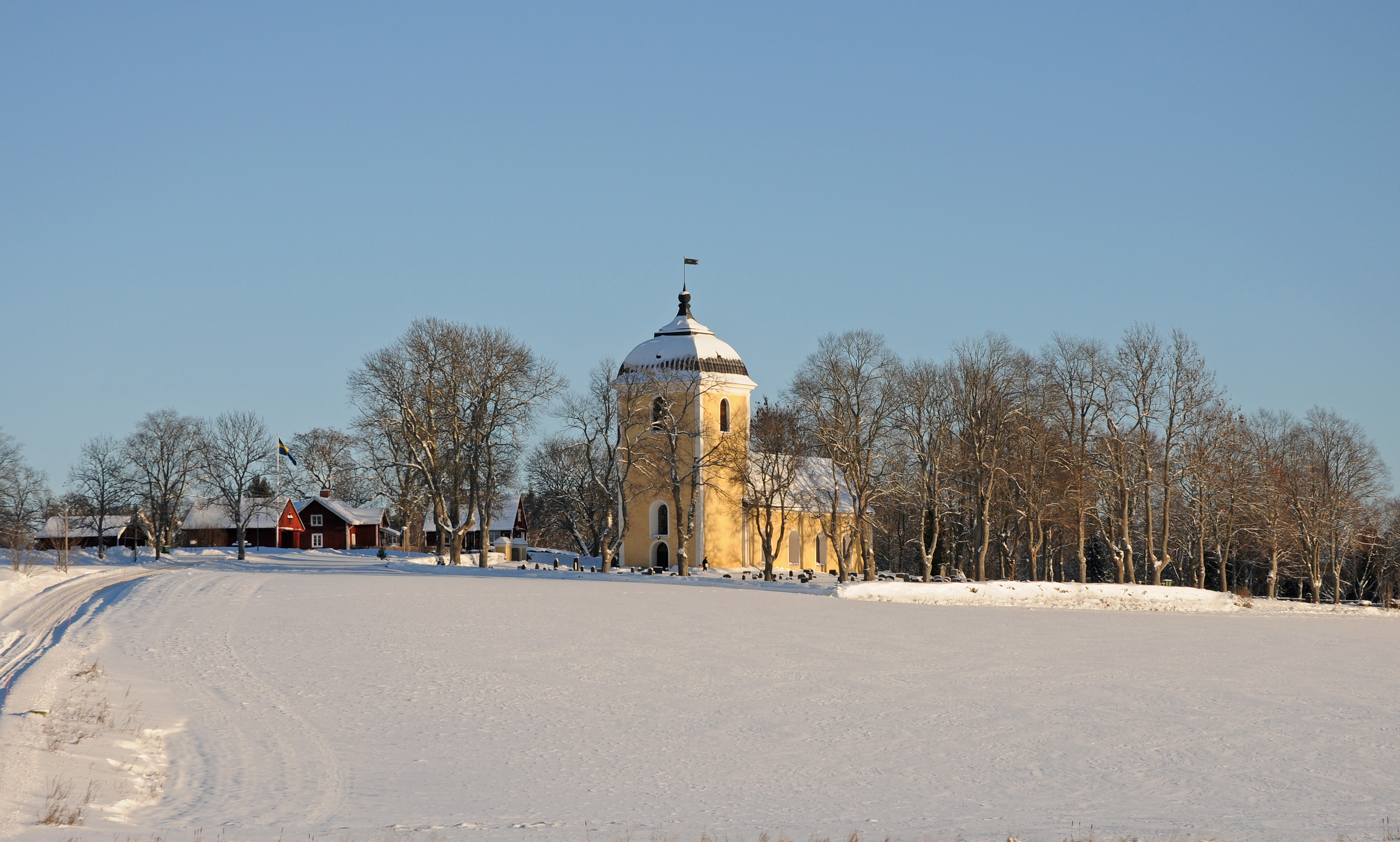
- Tystberga parish church in December 2010

- Location within Södermanland Location within Sweden
- Coordinates: 58°51′N 17°14′E
- Country: Sweden
- Province: Södermanland
- County: Södermanland County
- Municipality: Nyköping Municipality

Area
  - Total: 0.92 km^{2} (0.36 sq mi)

Population (31 December 2020)
  - Total: 895
  - Density: 970/km^{2} (2,500/sq mi)
- Time zone: UTC+1 (CET)
  - Summer (DST): UTC+2 (CEST)
- Climate: Cfb

Tystberga (local pronunciation Tystbärja) is a locality situated in Nyköping Municipality, Södermanland County, Sweden with 828 inhabitants as of 2010.

== Elections ==
Tystberga is the seat of the namesake electoral ward.

=== Riksdag ===
Year	%	Votes	V	S	MP	C	L	KD	M	SD	ND	Other
1973	92.9	1,117	2.6	40.6		38.0	3.9	3.8	10.8			0.3
1976	91.8	1,315	1.2	39.8		38.8	5.9	1.6	12.4			0.3
1979	91.5	1,331	3.7	40.7		33.1	5.4	1.7	15.0			0.5
1982	91.8	1,291	3.2	40.8	1.2	30.1	3.8	2.3	18.6			0.1
1985	90.1	1,231	2.5	41.3	1.8	27.3	9.7		17.2			0.1
1988	87.3	1,201	4.7	38.8	7.3	23.8	8.4	3.7	13.1			0.2
1991	87.6	1,358	3.2	33.6	3.4	18.6	6.7	8.2	16.1		9.7	0.6
1994	88.2	1,406	5.0	41.0	5.3	16.6	6.2	5.8	17.6		0.9	1.7
1998	82.3	1,325	11.7	33.4	5.8	11.2	3.0	16.1	17.7			1.1
2002	80.1	1,332	8.0	38.1	5.5	13.2	10.6	10.1	13.4	0.5		0.6
2006	82.1	1,440	5.6	29.6	6.2	13.1	6.0	8.0	24.9	3.5		3.2
2010	84.0	1,516	6.5	26.7	8.0	10.1	5.7	5.4	29.5	6.5		1.7
2014	84.7	1,507	6.4	27.1	5.8	10.6	3.8	3.6	22.0	16.2		4.7
2018	85.6	1,529	8.3	22.8	4.1	13.5	3.0	6.8	16.4	22.9		2.2
