= Runtuna =

- Location within Södermanland Location within Sweden
- Coordinates: 58°52′30″N 17°04′45″E
- Country: Sweden
- Province: Södermanland
- County: Södermanland County
- Municipality: Nyköping Municipality

Area
  - Total: 0.35 km^{2} (0.14 sq mi)

Population (31 December 2010)
  - Total: 250
  - Density: 715/km^{2} (1,850/sq mi)
- Time zone: UTC+1 (CET)
  - Summer (DST): UTC+2 (CEST)
- Climate: Cfb

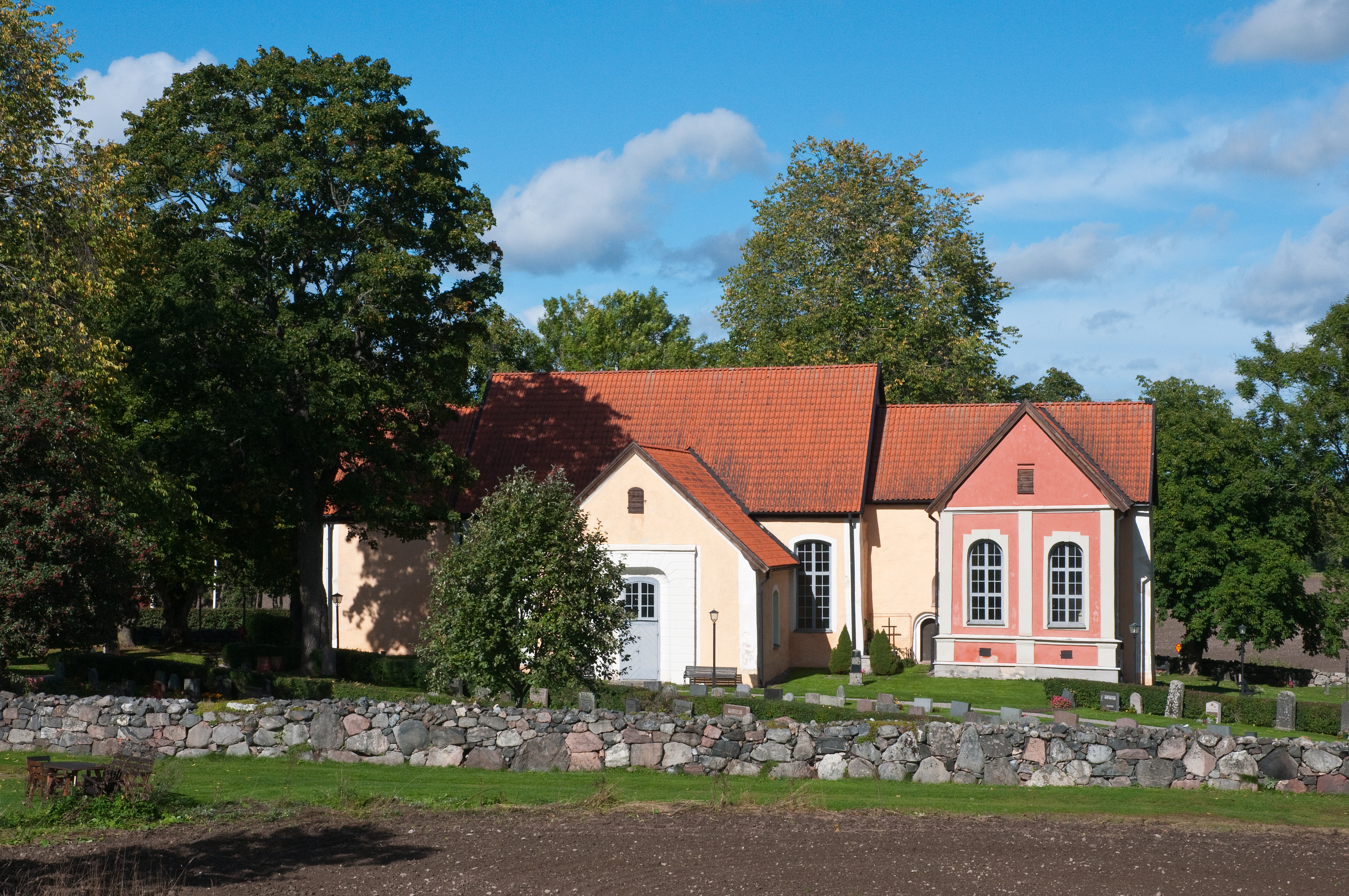
Runtuna

Runtuna (local pronunciation Runntúna) is a locality situated in Nyköping Municipality, Södermanland County, Sweden with 250 inhabitants in 2010.

== Elections ==
Runtuna has an electoral ward part of the Nyköping East constituency. The area covers a larger landmass than Runtuna's locality area, being adjacent to the Runtuna parish and the church that is about 4 kilometres (2.5 mi) northwest of the village. It has also been merged with the electoral district of Ludgo, growing larger during the 1973-2018 period.

Year	%	Votes	V	S	MP	C	L	KD	M	SD	ND	Other
1973	95.8	530	3.2	30.8		46.0	5.7	3.6	10.6			0.2
1976	96.5	544	1.3	32.7		46.1	6.1	2.4	11.2			0.2
1979	95.7	559	2.9	34.2		37.0	7.3	2.1	15.9			0.5
1982	95.0	591	1.4	37.1	1.7	34.2	4.1	3.2	18.4			0.0
1985	93.3	591	2.9	34.3	1.9	31.1	9.3		20.3			0.2
1988	91.8	598	4.2	30.8	5.7	26.4	8.4	4.0	20.2			0.3
1991	89.0	599	2.3	27.5	3.3	20.7	6.7	10.2	19.5		9.5	0.2
1994	90.0	595	5.0	36.5	6.4	20.2	3.9	5.2	20.8		0.3	1.7
1998	83.1	914	7.9	29.4	4.6	16.8	2.5	15.6	22.5			0.5
2002	84.7	901	5.3	33.3	5.9	19.1	8.2	13.0	13.5	1.1		0.5
2006	85.2	941	3.1	28.7	6.5	20.5	4.3	9.4	24.0	1.5		2.1
2010	87.1	988	3.4	26.2	8.2	13.7	5.5	6.6	29.5	5.1		1.9
2014	89.1	989	4.3	26.2	6.7	12.8	2.2	5.5	23.9	15.1		3.4
2018	88.9	1,001	6.1	25.6	4.3	14.0	2.4	7.4	19.4	19.5		1.4
