= Jönåker =

- Location within Södermanland Location within Sweden
- Coordinates: 58°44′N 16°43′E
- Country: Sweden
- Province: Södermanland
- County: Södermanland County
- Municipality: Nyköping Municipality

Area
  - Total: 0.96 km^{2} (0.37 sq mi)

Population (31 December 2020)
  - Total: 628
  - Density: 650/km^{2} (1,700/sq mi)
- Time zone: UTC+1 (CET)
  - Summer (DST): UTC+2 (CEST)
- Climate: Cfb

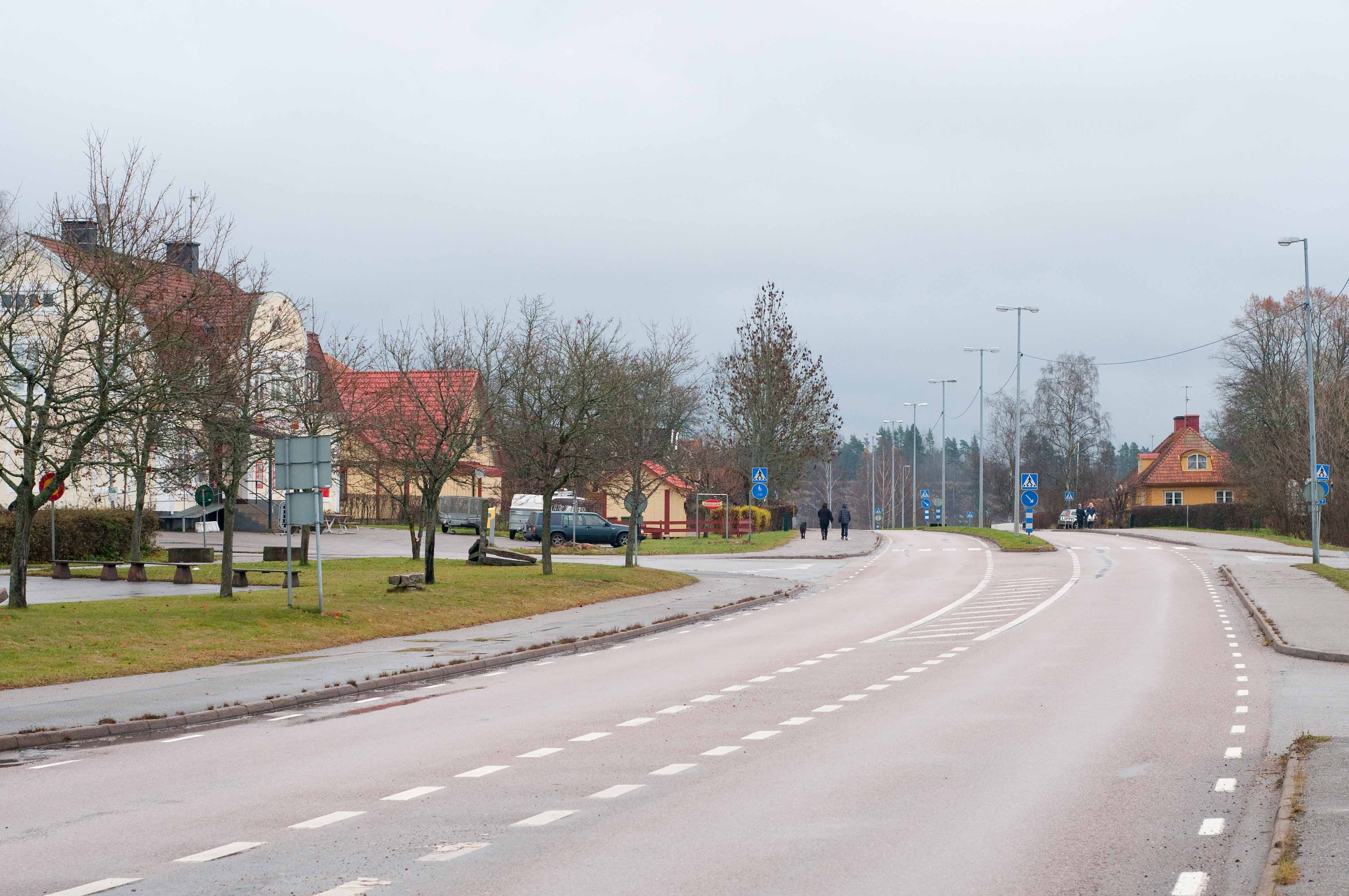
Street in Jönåker

Jönåker is a locality situated in Nyköping Municipality, Södermanland County, Sweden with 617 inhabitants in 2010. Jönåker is known locally for being situated right on a steep hill by local standards and the trading house, the so-called "Kalle in the hill" former gas station (Swedish: Kalle i Backen). The railway passes through Jönåker, but trains do not stop there, instead twisting around the hill on the route between Nyköping and Norrköping.

== Elections ==
Jönåker forms the Lunda electoral district in Nyköping Municipality, named after the local church atop the hill that Jönåker sits beneath. Lunda used to be a swing district in that it can go the way of both traditional coalitions, although it is solidly to the right of urban Nyköping throughout its history. Since 1973, while the district swung back and forth between the coalitions several times, the winning margins were rarely close. In 2022, the area had shifted back decisively to the right and became the only district where the Sweden Democrats won a major plurality in the municipality.

=== Riksdag ===
Year	%	Votes	V	S	MP	C	L	KD	M	SD	NyD	Left	Right
1973	89.6	734	1.4	42.2		36.2	4.6	4.0	11.6			43.6	52.5
1976	91.3	753	0.9	39.7		37.6	6.6	2.3	12.9			40.6	57.1
1979	89.4	730	2.5	42.6		31.0	6.3	3.6	13.7			45.1	51.0
1982	88.2	727	1.8	43.3	1.0	30.5	5.0	3.2	15.3			45.1	50.8
1985	88.2	730	2.2	43.0	2.5	29.5	8.5		14.0			45.2	51.9
1988	83.3	706	2.5	44.6	7.2	22.7	7.1	4.2	11.6			54.4	41.4
1991	87.1	744	2.8	38.2	2.8	20.6	5.6	6.9	13.8		9.1	41.0	46.9
1994	86.6	741	5.3	49.3	4.5	15.9	3.0	5.5	14.0		0.9	59.0	38.5
1998	82.2	731	10.4	44.5	3.1	9.6	2.0	17.6	12.6			58.0	41.7
2002	78.7	696	5.9	47.7	3.3	11.2	7.8	14.1	9.5	0.3		56.9	42.5
2006	80.6	693	3.6	37.5	3.5	12.3	4.6	12.0	21.5	3.5		44.6	50.4
2010	83.1	761	3.8	30.6	5.3	10.6	5.0	8.0	26.4	8.5		39.7	50.1
2014	87.2	796	3.0	32.0	4.4	9.3	3.0	8.0	17.2	20.2		39.4	37.6
2018	86.3	766	4.4	27.2	3.0	12.8	2.2	9.4	14.1	25.2		47.4	50.9
2022	85.2	792	2.7	26.8	3.7	7.8	2.7	6.8	15.5	32.6		40.9	57.6
