= Arnö =

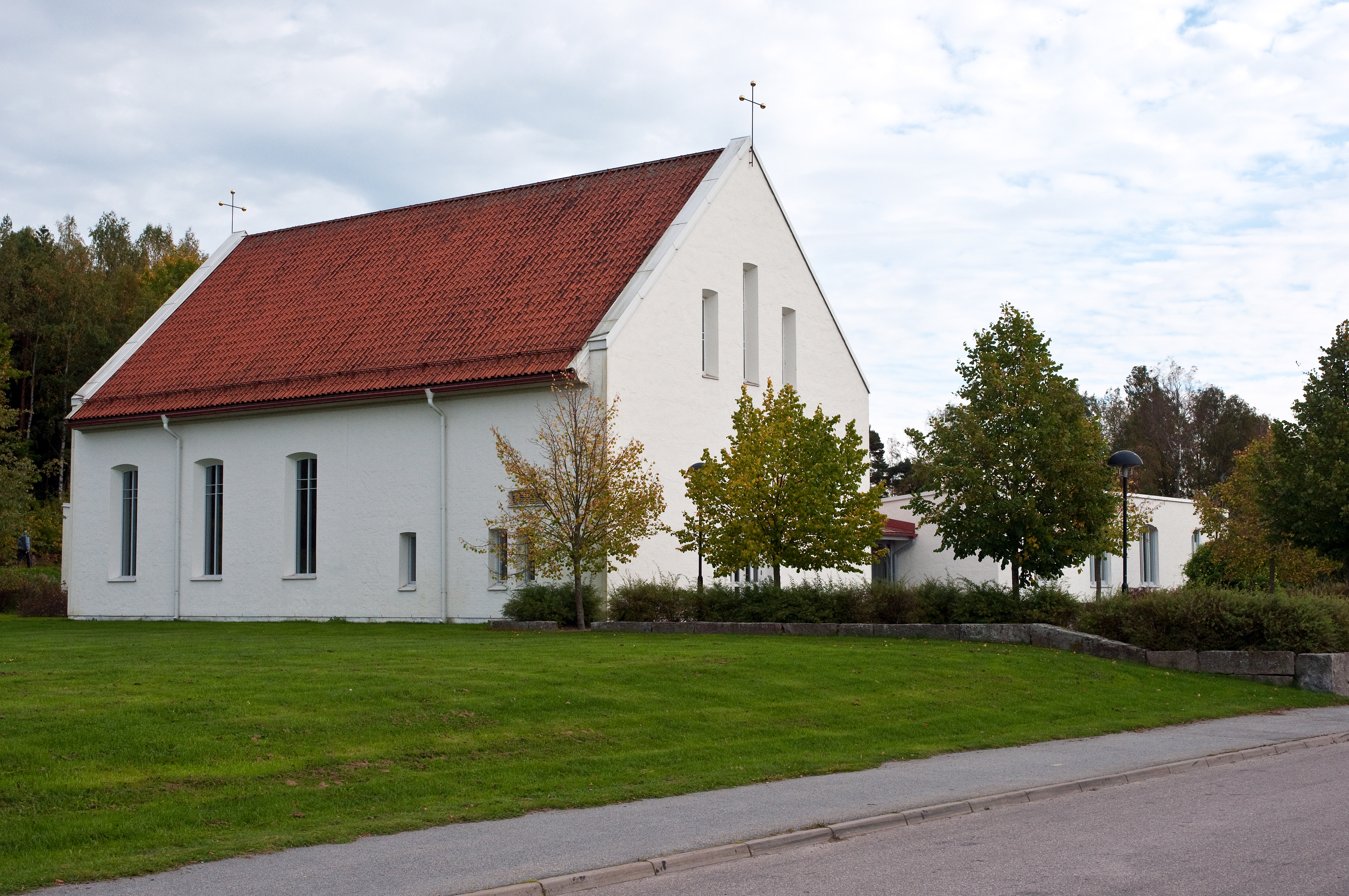

- Location within Södermanland Location within Sweden
- Coordinates: 58°44′N 17°01′E
- Country: Sweden
- Province: Södermanland
- County: Södermanland County
- Municipality: Nyköping Municipality

Area
  - Total: 2.10 km^{2} (0.81 sq mi)

Population (31 December 2010)
  - Total: 3,871
  - Density: 1,843/km^{2} (4,770/sq mi)
- Time zone: UTC+1 (CET)
  - Summer (DST): UTC+2 (CEST)

Arnö is a locality situated in Nyköping Municipality, Södermanland County, Sweden with 3,871 inhabitants in 2010.

== Geography ==
Arnö is situated on a peninsula on the south side of the bay, with Nyköping on the north side. Locally, Arnö is considered a part of main Nyköping, but is designated a locality due to the mile-long stretch between Nyköping and itself. The populated area was mainly built in the 1970s and has become a southern suburb of Nyköping, being in walking distance from the city. Expansion is planned eastwards towards the beach of Örstigsnäs. It is also located relatively near the town of Oxelösund, with its outer premises forming the municipal line.

== Riksdag elections ==
Year	%	Votes	V	S	MP	C	L	KD	M	SD	NyD	Left	Right
1973	93.2	1,634	3.0	59.4		19.3	6.2	2.8	9.1			62.4	34.5
1976	93.2	1,632	2.3	57.0		18.4	10.3	2.1	9.6			59.4	38.4
1979	93.6	1,554	3.8	59.5		12.9	9.7	1.8	11.8			63.3	34.4
1982	94.9	1,478	5.8	54.5	2.1	11.1	5.5	1.6	19.0			60.3	35.7
1985	94.2	1,640	5.7	52.2	1.3	6.7	15.5		18.4			57.9	40.6
1988	92.1	1,653	6.2	49.6	5.1	7.3	14.1	1.9	15.1			61.0	36.4
1991	92.4	1,610	4.7	44.5	2.6	3.5	12.5	5.7	19.9		5.8	49.2	41.6
1994	92.0	1,860	7.3	54.1	4.8	3.1	9.1	3.1	17.0		0.6	66.3	32.3
1998	84.8	1,807	10.7	48.8	4.6	3.5	4.0	9.8	16.8			64.1	34.1
2002	82.4	1,959	9.0	53.4	4.3	3.5	10.4	8.6	9.9	0.4		66.8	32.3
2006	84.5	2,134	4.9	45.4	5.7	5.0	7.2	6.2	23.1	1.5		56.0	41.4
2010	87.3	2,277	4.8	40.8	9.8	3.2	7.5	4.4	25.0	3.5		55.4	40.1
2014	88.7	2,492	4.2	37.6	11.1	3.7	5.0	3.8	22.6	9.1		52.9	35.1
2018	85.2	2,772	6.9	36.8	4.9	8.6	4.9	5.5	21.3	10.2		57.3	41.9

== Cityscape ==
The locality is divided into four areas. The northwestern area is named Herrhagen, which is a high-density residential area with mostly apartments. Långsätter is the largest area, located in between the circular road. It consists of villas as well as Tract housing. The northeastern area is named Kuggnäs after an old farm. The buildings in that area is mostly villas. The last area is Finntorp and Björkö, which together forms an area for manufacturing industries as well as commerce. The local prison of the Nyköping Municipality area is located here as well as the spare parts storage center of Saab Automobile.
