= Sjösa =

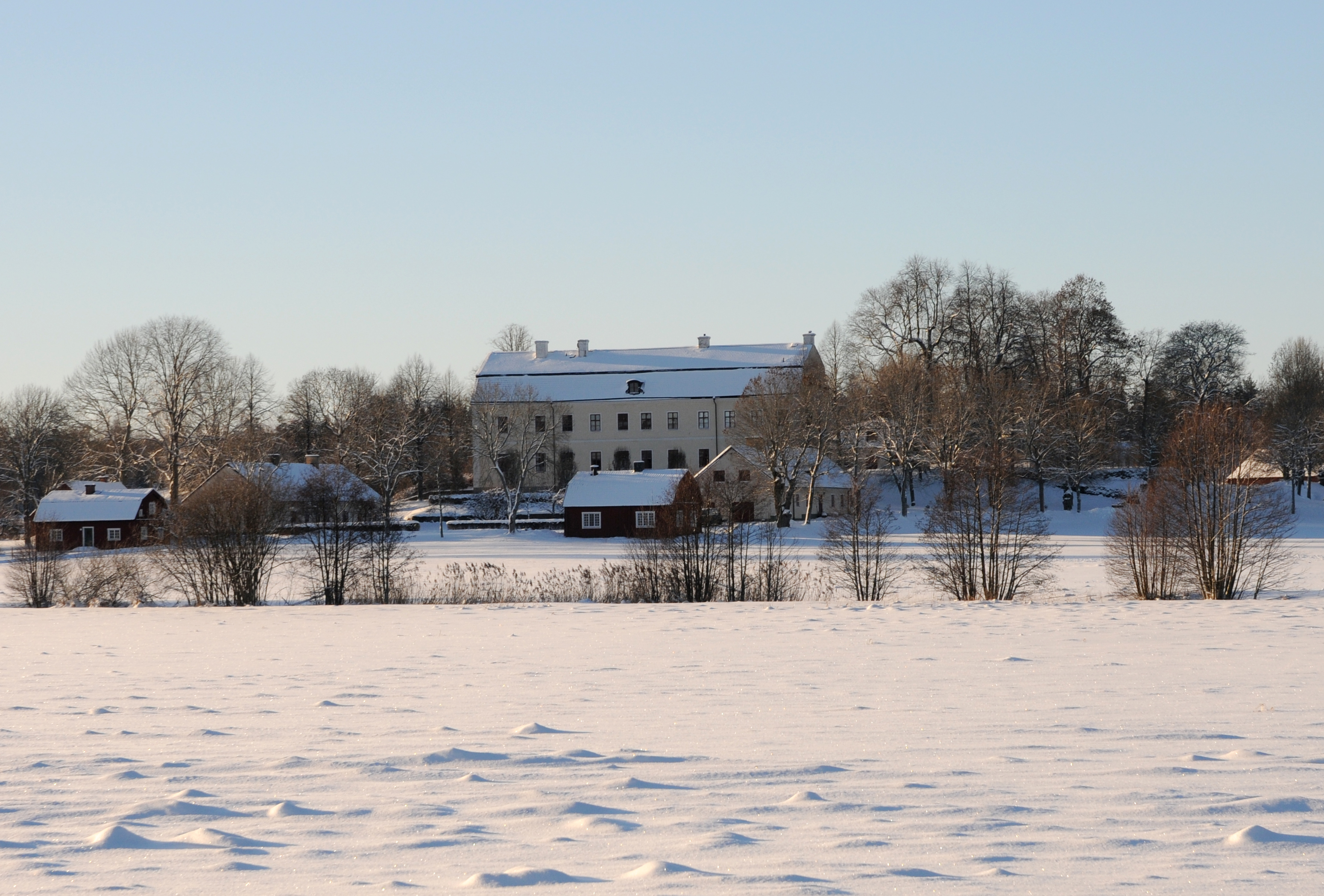
- Sjösa farm in December 2010

- Location within Södermanland Location within Sweden
- Coordinates: 58°46′N 17°05′E
- Country: Sweden
- Province: Södermanland
- County: Södermanland County
- Municipality: Nyköping Municipality

Area
  - Total: 0.52 km^{2} (0.20 sq mi)

Population (31 December 2020)
  - Total: 487
  - Density: 940/km^{2} (2,400/sq mi)
- Time zone: UTC+1 (CET)
  - Summer (DST): UTC+2 (CEST)
- Climate: Cfb

Sjösa is a locality situated in Nyköping Municipality, Södermanland County, Sweden with 483 inhabitants in 2010.

== Elections ==
Sjösa is the sole locality in the otherwise rural Svärta electoral ward that covers the area around Svärta Church a few miles to its northwest.

=== Riksdag ===
Year	%	Votes	V	S	MP	C	L	KD	M	SD	NyD	Left	Right
1973	92.5	470	2.6	44.9		34.3	5.5	3.0	9.1			47.4	48.9
1976	94.0	549	2.2	43.0		30.8	11.3	0.7	11.7			45.2	53.7
1979	95.6	610	1.8	45.2		23.3	9.3	1.3	18.5			47.0	51.1
1982	95.8	597	1.5	42.7	2.7	24.8	5.5	2.2	20.6			46.9	50.9
1985	93.8	579	2.4	39.7	1.9	22.6	12.1		21.2			42.1	56.0
1988	93.9	580	3.1	41.4	7.4	19.3	8.6	2.6	17.6			51.9	45.5
1991	92.0	553	2.9	37.3	3.6	17.4	8.1	8.3	13.2		7.8	40.1	47.0
1994	92.0	567	6.3	43.6	6.9	14.8	5.8	4.4	16.0		0.7	56.8	41.1
1998	86.5	558	11.1	37.8	5.7	11.5	2.3	15.4	15.8			54.7	45.0
2002	88.2	557	7.5	44.3	4.5	11.3	10.2	9.7	11.1	0.7		56.4	42.4
2006	88.2	628	5.3	35.2	7.3	11.3	7.6	8.4	19.3	3.8		47.8	46.7
2010	90.0	701	5.1	25.3	8.4	8.0	6.9	4.9	36.1	5.3		38.8	55.8
2014	90.3	719	4.2	28.2	8.9	6.8	3.9	3.5	27.5	14.7		41.3	41.7
2018	90.6	834	5.8	27.8	4.8	9.7	4.0	6.4	21.8	19.1		48.1	51.2
2022	89.9	1,013	4.3	27.1	4.3	8.2	3.4	3.7	25.7	22.9		44.0	55.6
