= Nävekvarn =

- Location within Södermanland Location within Sweden
- Coordinates: 58°38′N 16°48′E
- Country: Sweden
- Province: Södermanland
- County: Södermanland County
- Municipality: Nyköping Municipality

Area
  - Total: 1.11 km^{2} (0.43 sq mi)

Population (31 December 2020)
  - Total: 779
  - Density: 702/km^{2} (1,820/sq mi)
- Time zone: UTC+1 (CET)
  - Summer (DST): UTC+2 (CEST)
- Climate: Cfb

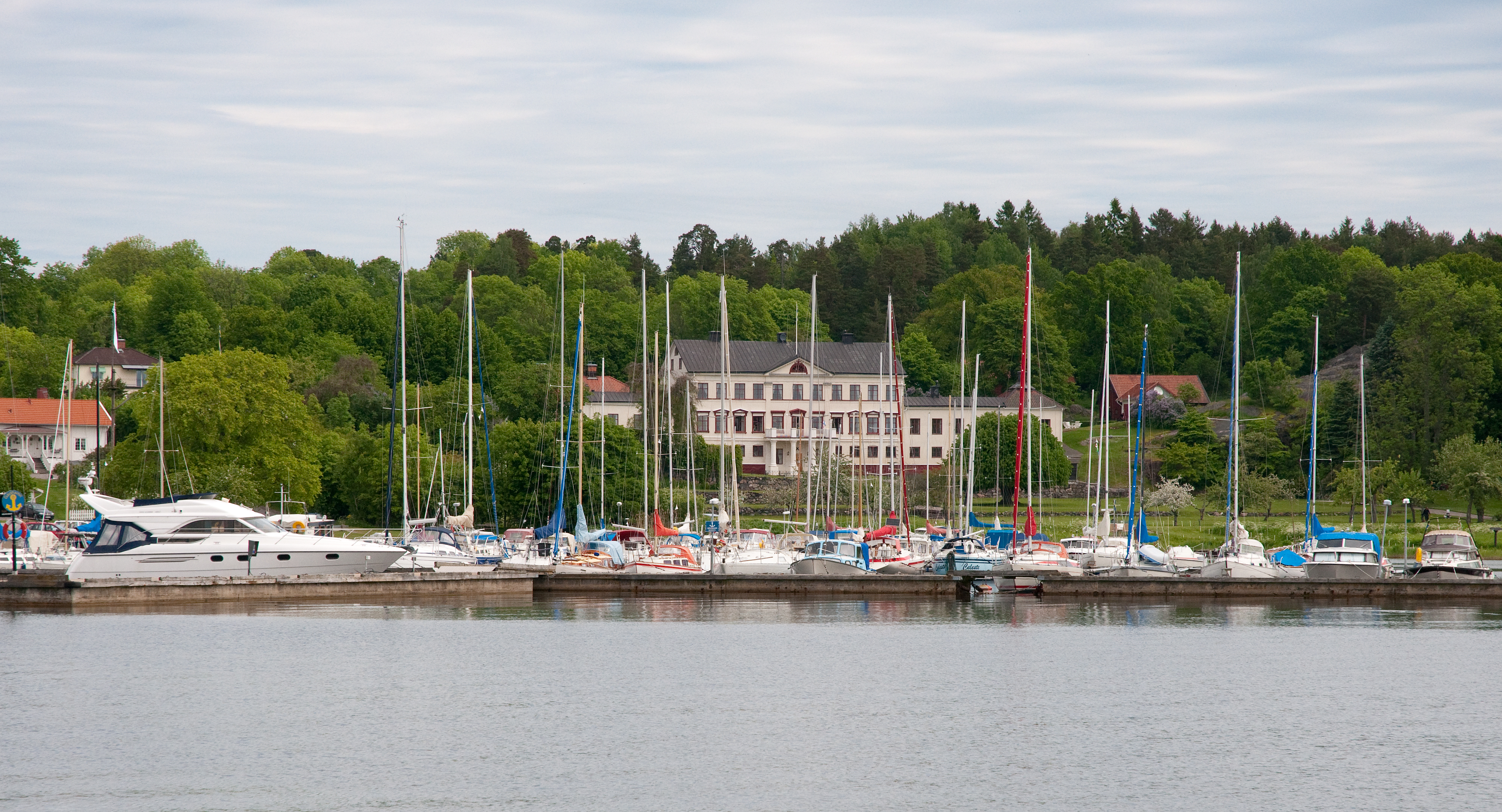
Nävekvarn at the port

Nävekvarn (Swedish pronunciation: [nɛvɛˈkvɑːɳ]) is a locality situated in Tunaberg, Nyköping Municipality, Södermanland County, Sweden with 795 inhabitants in 2010.

== Election results ==
Nävekvarn has a municipal constituency that covers the locality and the surrounding forests. In all references, the results for Nävekvarn are being found under Nyköping's.

=== Riksdag ===
Year	%	Votes	V	S	MP	C	L	KD	M	SD	NyD	Left	Right
1973	93.7	648	6.0	70.8		12.3	4.6	1.1	5.2			76.9	21.9
1976	93.4	746	3.2	66.5		18.0	3.6	0.7	7.8			69.7	29.4
1979	91.2	799	4.3	65.1		14.9	4.0	0.6	10.5			69.3	29.4
1982	91.5	841	4.8	68.3	1.7	10.4	2.7	1.1	10.9			73.0	24.1
1985	91.1	843	4.7	65.6	1.9	9.4	8.5		9.8			70.3	27.8
1988	87.6	773	5.6	63.4	6.9	4.9	6.0	2.8	10.1			75.8	21.0
1991	87.4	817	5.3	54.2	4.7	6.9	3.7	5.5	12.0		7.6	59.5	28.0
1994	88.9	833	8.0	62.4	3.5	4.7	2.9	4.1	12.5		1.4	71.9	24.1
1998	82.1	779	14.0	52.6	3.6	4.4	1.3	10.1	11.9			70.2	27.7
2002	80.0	784	11.5	52.0	5.6	4.7	6.7	6.7	10.8	1.5		69.1	28.8
2006	86.1	860	6.4	48.0	5.1	7.2	4.7	7.3	16.3	3.0		59.5	35.5
2010	85.7	857	6.9	38.6	7.8	5.5	5.1	4.3	24.5	6.5		53.3	39.4
2014	87.2	831	7.2	40.0	7.0	5.5	2.1	3.7	16.1	16.3		54.2	27.4
2018	87.2	775	7.0	36.0	4.3	7.4	1.7	5.7	14.1	22.2		54.6	43.6
2022	84.0	746	6.6	35.1	5.8	4.3	2.9	6.3	13.8	25.1		51.7	48.1
