= Nyköpingsån =

Coordinates: 58°45′N 17°01′E

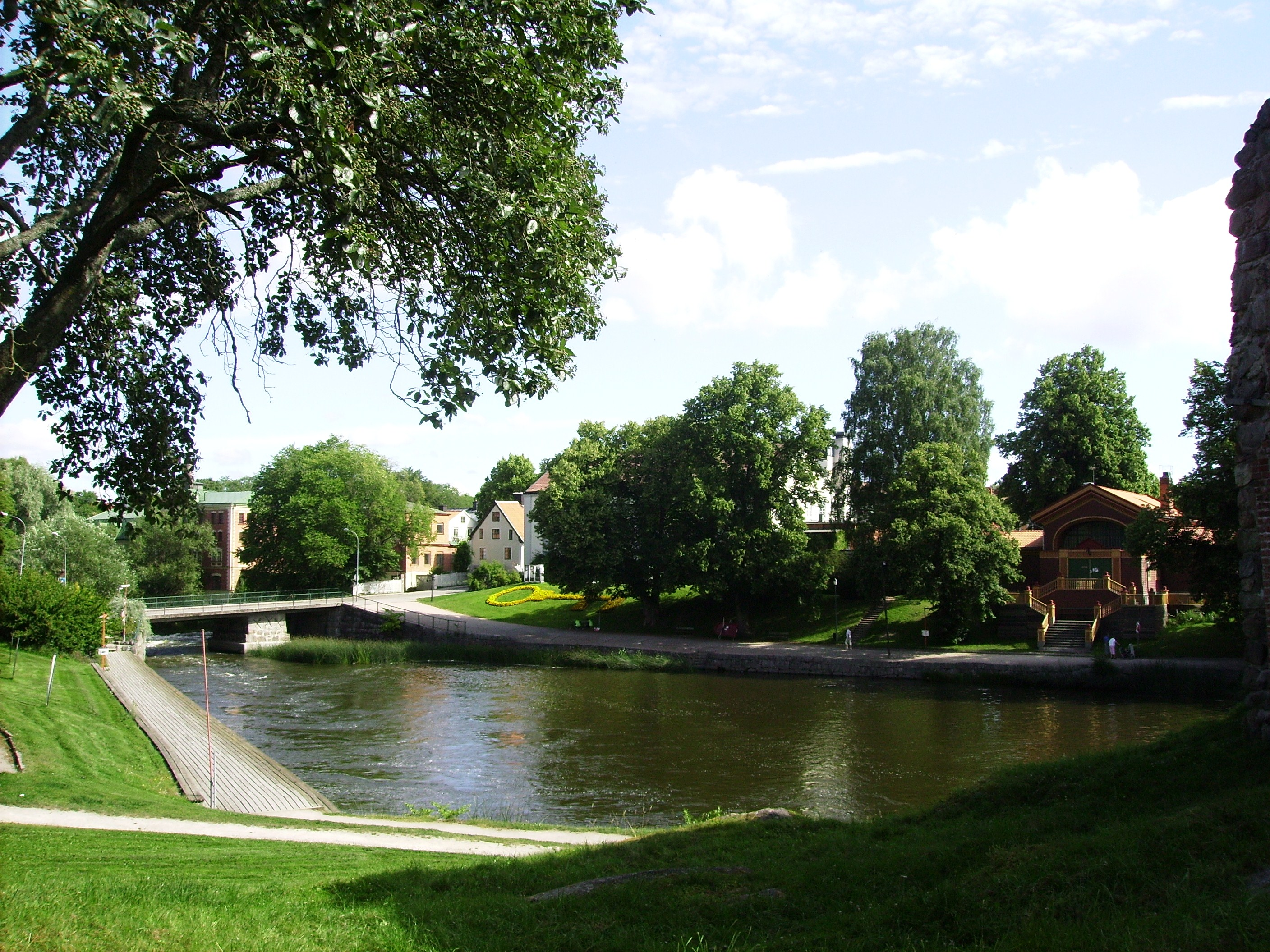
- Nyköpingsån near its outflow in downtown Nyköping.

Location
- Country: Sweden
- Counties: Södermanland, Örebro, Östergötland
- Municipalities: Askersund, Finspång, Flen, Gnesta, Hallsberg, Katrineholm, Norrköping, Nyköping, Vingåker, Örebro

Physical characteristics
- Source
  - location: Svartsjön, Hallsberg Municipality
  - elevation: 187 metres (614 ft)
- Mouth
  - location: Nyköping
  - elevation: 0 metres (0 ft)
- Length: 150 km (93 mi)
- Basin size: 3,631.6 km^{2} (1,402.2 sq mi)
- Discharge
  - average: 23 m^{3}/s (810 cu ft/s)

Nyköpingsån is a river primarily flowing through Södermanland County in Sweden. The river is named after Nyköping, where it flows into the Baltic Sea. Nyköping is also the largest settlement on the river proper and a large part of the drainage area water is in the corresponding municipality. Nyköpingsån is one of two rivers to flow into the harbour of Nyköping, the other being Kilaån that winds through the southwestern part of the municipality eastwards from Kolmården.

The highest source of the river is the small lake of Svartsjön in Hallsberg Municipality, Örebro County at 187 metres (614 ft) above sea level. The innermost source and furthest western part is Norra Dovrasjön also in Hallsberg Municipality at a somewhat lower elevation. The innermost and most elevated riverside locality is in Åsbro at 100 metres (330 ft) when the river passes through the lake of Tisaren. Although a shorter and lower route, it also leads into the lake of Tisnaren in Östergötland County in the north of Finspång Municipality. That source is further down towards but not quite at Simonstorp in Norrköping Municipality, making it a tri-county river. The river flows out of several sizeable lakes in Södermanland's interior, the two largest being Båven and Yngaren. Notably, the village of Vrena 24 kilometres (15 mi) northwest of Nyköping is surrounded by lakes in the drainage area and the small river passing through the village connects the western and eastern parts of the river system.

Most of the river and its drainage area lakes are navigable by small boats, except for hydroelectrical, artificial waterfalls in Nyköping. Some river passages between lakes are very narrow. At the innermost part, the gap between two lakes in the drainage area of Nyköpingsån and the one of Vättern and Motala ström is just above 110 metres (360 ft). This narrowly avoids making the area between Motala and Nyköping a natural island. Also near Simonstorp the system is also merely a kilometer away from where the source of the aforementioned Kilaån is.

== Locations in the drainage area ==
The localities are listed sorted after distance to the maritime outflow in Nyköping.

- Åsbro
- Svennevad
- Kilsmo
- Brevens bruk
- Högsjö
- Vingåker
- Regna
- Hävla
- Katrineholm
- Flen
- Sparreholm
- Vadsbro
- Björkvik
- Bettna
- Vrena
- Stigtomta
- Nyköping

== Larger lakes ==
- Båven
- Hallbosjön
- Kolsnaren
- Lidsjön
- Långhalsen
- Sottern
- Tisnaren
- Yngaren
