= Yngaren =

Lake of Södermanland, Sweden

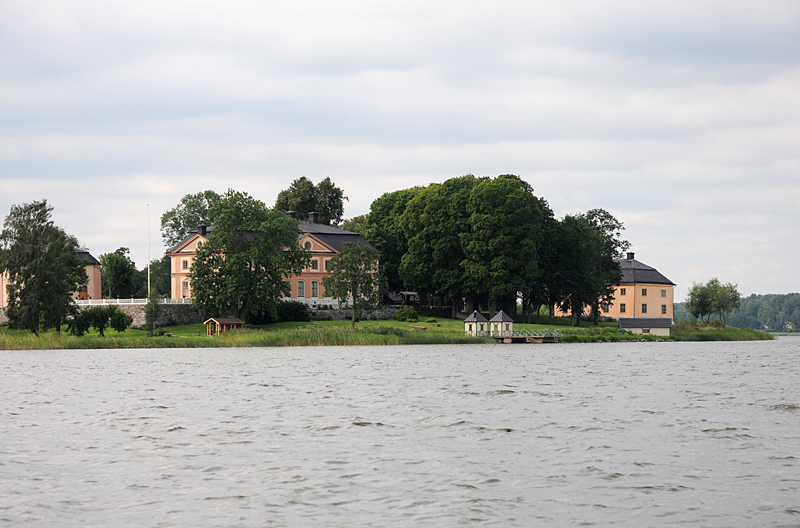
- Åkerö Castle seen across Lake Yngaren

- Location within Södermanland
- Coordinates: 58°52′N 16°35′E
- Basin countries: Sweden

Yngaren is a lake in Södermanland County, Sweden. It is the second largest lake within Södermanland's interior after Båven.

== Geography ==
Yngaren is located in south-central Södermanland and drains into small river Nyköpingsån through lakes Hallbosjön and Långhalsen followed by Stadsfjärden of downtown Nyköping into the Baltic Sea. The lake is relatively shallow and tends to easily freeze over to water ice during winter even after short spells below freezing due to its narrow and shallow nature. Even so, its maximum depth of about 20 metres (66 ft) makes it deeper than most lakes in Södermanland. Yngaren is part of a lake system drained into Nyköpingsån with the aforementioned Hallbosjön and Långhalsen together with Torpsjön, Lidsjön, Båven and some smaller lakes. Together, these bodies of water dominate the geography of central Södermanland.

== Demographics ==
Yngaren is located within three different municipalities. The southern half of the lake is set within Nyköping Municipality, the north-western part in Katrineholm Municipality and the north-eastern part in Flen Municipality. None of the municipal seats are set on the lake and are all about 20 kilometres (12 mi) from the nearest shoreline.

=== Settlements ===
These settlements are located either at or near Yngaren's shoreline and have their respective municipal districts follow the lake.

- Bettna (Flen)
- Björkvik (Katrineholm)
- Stigtomta (Nyköping)
- Vrena (Nyköping)
