= Vrena =

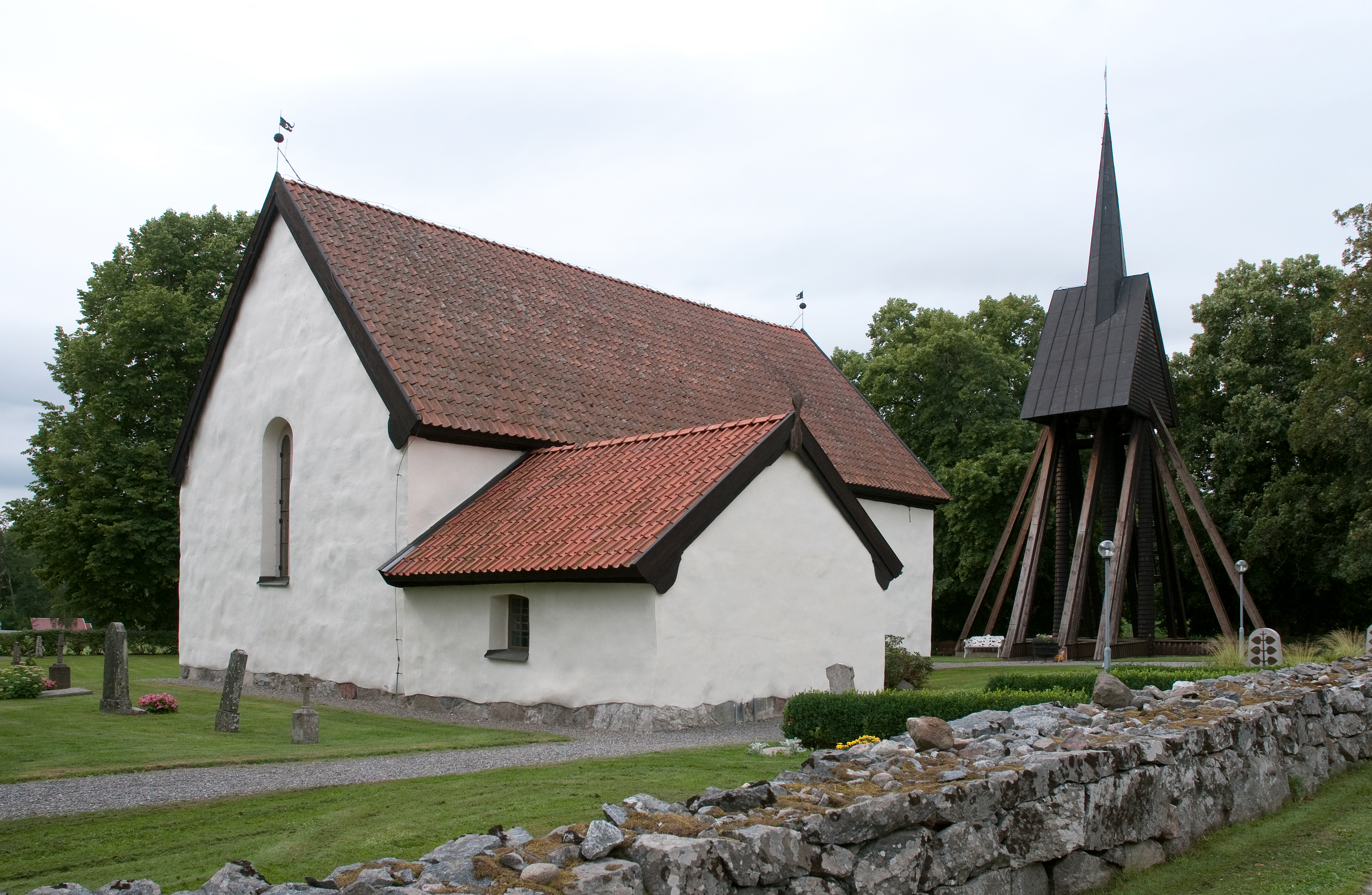
- Vrena Church

- Location within Södermanland Location within Sweden
- Coordinates: 58°52′N 16°41′E
- Country: Sweden
- Province: Södermanland
- County: Södermanland County
- Municipality: Nyköping Municipality

Area
  - Total: 0.97 km^{2} (0.37 sq mi)

Population (31 December 2020)
  - Total: 643
  - Density: 660/km^{2} (1,700/sq mi)
- Time zone: UTC+1 (CET)
  - Summer (DST): UTC+2 (CEST)
- Climate: Cfb

Vrena (local pronunciation Vréna) is a locality situated in Nyköping Municipality, Södermanland County, Sweden with 630 inhabitants as of 2015.

== Geography ==
Vrena is located between the lakes of Hallbosjön and Långhalsen along national road 52. The larger lake of Yngaren is also close. The area is surrounded by lakes in multiple directions and is situated on a narrow branch of elevated land that separates the various Sörmlandic lake basins. Vrena's shorelines are at about 19 metres (62 ft) of elevation. The village is about 24 kilometres (15 mi) northwest from downtown Nyköping and 26 kilometres (16 mi) south of the smaller town of Flen. The fully open sea is about 30 kilometres (19 mi) to the southeast. Vrena is also nearly halfway between the settlements of Stigtomta and Bettna, the latter on the other side of the nearby boundary of Flen Municipality.

The local climate is mild for its latitude. Lake moderation vanishes in winter since those frequently freeze over. During summer the surrounding waters lower diurnal temperature variation, rendering milder days and warmer nights than would be expected for a location in the Sörmlandic interior. The nearest weather stations at similar low elevation are in the inland Flodafors and the seaside Oxelösund, with Vrena's lakeside climate a mixture of the two.

== Elections ==
Vrena has an electoral ward in Nyköping Municipality, covering the village and the surrounding areas around Yngaren. Although the locality's industrial roots rendered it left-wing in the past, in the early 21st century the pattern flipped as Vrena became more of a residential commuter village, thus switching to the right.

=== Riksdag ===
Year	%	Votes	V	S	MP	C	L	KD	M	SD	NyD	Other	Left	Right
1973	92.1	570	3.0	54.9		26.7	4.0	2.8	8.1			0.5	57.9	38.8
1976	95.5	760	1.6	50.3		29.1	5.4	2.4	11.1			0.3	51.8	45.5
1979	92.1	745	1.9	51.0		25.0	6.3	2.1	13.3			0.3	52.9	44.6
1982	93.0	752	2.3	52.1	0.8	22.3	4.0	2.7	15.8			0.0	54.4	42.2
1985	93.0	745	3.0	51.3	1.3	20.0	8.5		16.0			0.0	54.2	44.4
1988	90.6	710	3.5	51.5	4.1	19.2	6.2	1.4	13.8			0.3	59.2	39.2
1991	89.9	707	2.7	48.2	3.0	16.4	4.5	3.0	16.0		5.8	0.4	50.9	39.9
1994	89.3	702	3.7	53.6	4.7	15.4	2.6	2.4	16.4		0.6	0.7	62.0	36.8
1998	85.8	809	12.1	41.1	3.1	10.6	1.7	12.4	18.2			0.7	56.4	42.9
2002	85.6	807	7.8	43.6	4.6	12.0	7.1	9.4	14.4	0.2		0.9	56.0	42.9
2006	85.6	801	5.1	38.3	3.8	13.1	4.4	6.6	24.0	3.0		1.7	47.2	48.1
2010	86.7	773	6.5	31.1	4.5	14.5	4.0	4.5	27.7	5.8		1.4	42.0	50.7
2014	86.5	790	4.8	28.9	4.7	14.3	2.8	3.5	22.7	14.7		3.7	38.4	43.3
2018	87.2	827	5.6	23.4	3.1	11.7	3.5	8.2	18.9	21.6		1.9	45.8	52.2
2022	86.5	812	4.1	29.3	3.2	8.3	2.8	6.4	20.3	24.0		1.6	44.8	53.6
