= Mellösa Church =

Coordinates: 59.0992°N 16.5550°E

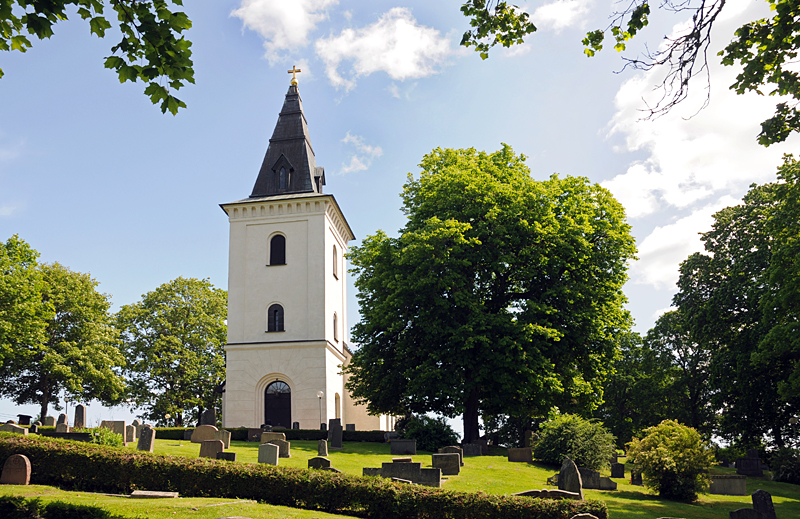
- Mellösa Church in June 2011
- Mellösa Church
- Location: Mellösa
- Country: Sweden
- Denomination: Church of Sweden
- Website: Mellösa församling

Administration
- Diocese: Strängnäs
- Parish: Mellösa Parish

Mellösa Church is a church building in Mellösa parish in Flen, Södermanland County, Sweden.

== The church building ==
The church was built in the 13th century and the latest change exterior was made in 1874, when the tower was built. The baptismal font, which is from the 12th century, is the oldest object in the church. According to Mellösa in Sörmlandsleden, the church received its location where two oxen had dragged a log and finally lied down.
