= Sparreholm Castle =

- Sparrholms slott
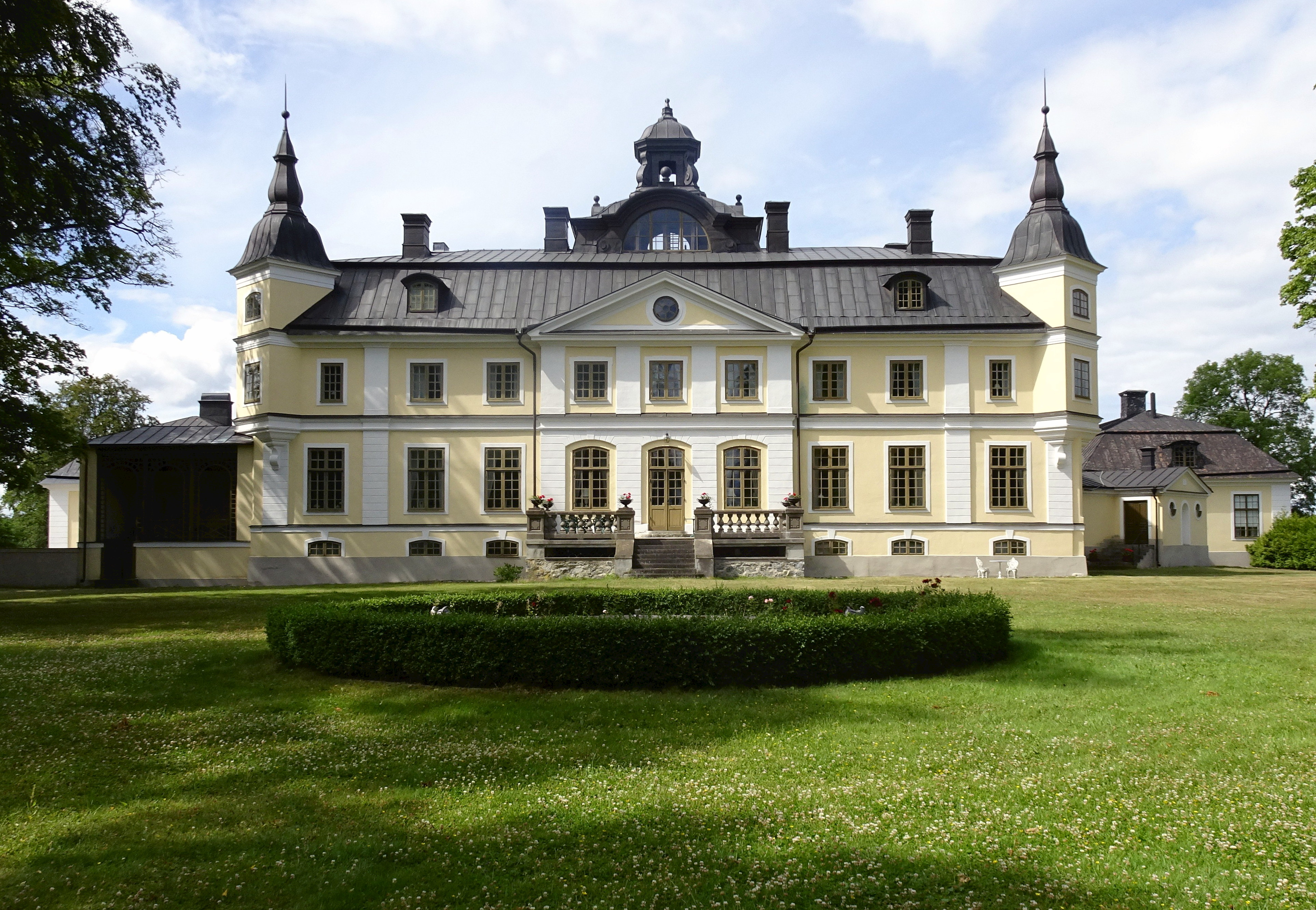
- Interactive map of the Sparreholm Castle area

General information
- Location: Flen Municipality, Södermanland County, Sweden, Sweden

Sparreholm Castle (Swedish: Sparreholms slott) is a manor house in Flen Municipality, Södermanland County, Sweden. The estate is located on Lake Båven just outside the community of Sparreholm in Hyltinge parish.

== History ==
The main house received its current appearance in the 1890s, according to drawings by architect Johan August Westerberg (1836-1900). At the manor, there are conference facilities and a café. The Sparreholm automobile museum is located in a separate hall east of the manor. South of the manor, in the former carriage house, is a large collection of jukeboxes. On the ground floor of the building is the bicycle museum.

== See also ==
- List of castles in Sweden
