= Bettna =

- Location within Södermanland Location within Sweden
- Coordinates: 58°54′N 16°38′E
- Country: Sweden
- Province: Södermanland
- County: Södermanland County
- Municipality: Flen Municipality

Area
  - Total: 0.99 km^{2} (0.38 sq mi)

Population (31 December 2020)
  - Total: 375
  - Density: 380/km^{2} (980/sq mi)
- Time zone: UTC+1 (CET)
  - Summer (DST): UTC+2 (CEST)

Bettna is a locality situated in Flen Municipality, Södermanland County, Sweden with 412 inhabitants in 2010. It is also a parish with the same name.

Bettna is located at a similar distance from Flen, Katrineholm and Nyköping (20-30 km) and about 5 kilometres (3.1 mi) from the nearest village of Vrena across the Nyköping municipal line. The boundary goes a few hundred metres from the village entrance by national road 52. The topography around the village is generally flat with occasional rolling hills and little elevation is covered when travelling to either of the three nearby municipal centres. It lies at roughly 30 metres (98 ft) above sea level. Bettna is also adjacent to the lake Yngaren and also has other lakes in its vicinity.

The oldest part of the church was built in the 12th century. Its organ was approved by the Swedish king Gustaf III shortly before his assassination in 1792. The organ was reconstructed in 1988.

The Swedish post-impressionist painter Nils von Dardel was born in Bettna in 1888.

== Riksdag elections ==
The village of Bettna proper forms a district with the smaller village of Vadsbro to its north and the surrounding agrarian and forested lands. It has been voting for the opposite centre-right coalitions in every election of the unicameral era compared to the municipal seat of Flen and the municipality as a whole.

Year	%	Votes	V	S	MP	C	L	KD	M	SD	NyD	Left	Right
1973	93.8	1,080	2.2	34.3		42.4	6.0	1.3	13.8			36.5	62.2
1976	92.6	1,042	1.4	32.0		45.1	5.0	1.1	15.5			33.4	65.5
1979	92.9	1,054	1.3	32.8		38.5	6.1	0.8	20.3			34.2	65.7
1982	93.8	1,057	1.6	32.8	1.5	36.0	2.7	1.6	23.7			34.4	62.4
1985	90.1	1,026	2.1	32.8	1.7	31.3	9.2		22.8			35.0	63.3
1988	88.6	992	2.4	31.4	6.3	28.4	9.1	1.6	20.6			40.0	58.1
1991	88.7	1,027	2.6	27.5	5.2	20.8	5.6	7.2	21.7		9.1	30.1	55.3
1994	88.4	1,029	4.3	34.0	6.6	20.0	4.2	3.9	24.9		0.6	44.9	53.0
1998	83.6	892	7.2	26.5	8.9	15.7	2.1	14.5	24.0			42.5	56.3
2002	85.2	957	4.7	31.5	6.0	19.5	7.9	11.4	16.9	0.5		42.1	55.8
2006	85.4	928	3.3	28.0	6.3	18.9	3.4	7.1	27.5	2.5		37.6	56.9
2010	83.6	961	3.3	24.2	7.6	16.9	4.5	4.9	32.3	5.0		35.2	58.5
2014	81.1	923	5.2	24.2	5.5	14.5	2.7	3.7	27.2	14.7		34.9	48.1
2018	84.0	1,043	5.8	20.3	4.7	14.9	3.0	8.8	21.7	19.2		45.7	52.6
