= Malmköping =

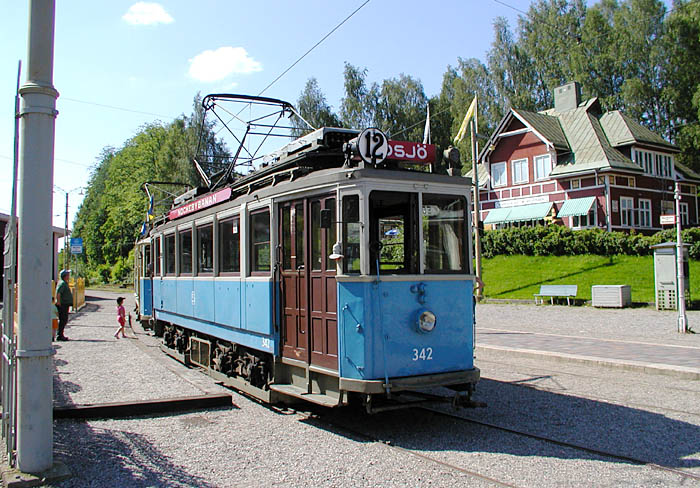
- A heritage tram in Malmköping

- Coat of arms

- Location within Södermanland Location within Sweden
- Coordinates: 59°08′N 16°44′E
- Country: Sweden
- Province: Södermanland
- County: Södermanland County
- Municipality: Flen Municipality

Area
  - Total: 1.31 km^{2} (0.51 sq mi)

Population (31 December 2020)
  - Total: 2,180
  - Density: 1,660/km^{2} (4,310/sq mi)
- Time zone: UTC+1 (CET)
  - Summer (DST): UTC+2 (CEST)

Malmköping is a locality situated in Flen Municipality, Södermanland County, Sweden with 2 180 inhabitants in 2020.

Malmköping is located about 15 kilometers north-east of the municipal seat Flen. It is a tourist attraction due to its many annual markets. The traditions of markets in Malmköping goes back more than two centuries, as Malmköping got market town rights (köping) in 1785.

In the center of Malmköping there is a ski slope located, also known as Malmabacken which was established in 1965.

There is also a museum tramway in Malmköping, the Museispårvägen Malmköping, which runs heritage trams from most of the Swedish tramway systems.

Olympian Helge Meuller was born here.

== Riksdag elections ==
Year	%	Votes	V	S	MP	C	L	KD	M	SD	NyD	Left	Right
1973	92.5	2,106	2.6	41.5		31.1	10.1	1.8	12.9			44.1	54.1
1976	92.1	2,144	2.1	41.0		31.4	9.5	1.9	14.0			43.1	54.9
1979	92.3	1,709	2.4	44.2		22.7	9.8	1.8	18.6			46.6	51.1
1982	91.0	1,723	2.6	47.6	2.1	18.6	5.6	1.8	21.4			50.3	45.6
1985	90.0	1,707	2.9	46.7	2.9	14.6	13.4		19.3			49.6	48.4
1988	84.8	1,635	2.9	43.7	7.4	14.0	11.1	2.8	15.1			56.8	40.2
1991	84.8	1,704	2.2	41.0	3.4	11.2	7.2	9.0	18.2		7.9	43.2	45.5
1994	86.3	1,742	4.6	47.2	6.5	9.3	6.4	4.8	19.7		0.6	58.4	40.3
1998	78.9	1,552	11.4	39.9	5.9	7.0	3.2	11.8	19.6			57.3	41.6
2002	77.3	1,974	6.6	41.4	6.4	8.7	10.9	10.3	13.6	0.9		54.5	43.6
2006	80.8	2,035	4.7	38.2	5.2	11.8	5.2	6.0	24.2	3.1		48.1	47.3
2010	81.0	2,020	5.2	31.1	6.9	12.6	5.0	5.6	24.8	8.1		43.2	48.0
2014	84.0	2,005	4.6	31.1	5.8	10.7	4.3	3.3	20.6	16.6		41.5	39.0
2018	84.7	2,017	5.2	26.8	4.2	10.8	4.1	5.5	20.3	21.7		47.0	51.6

== In literature ==
Jonas Jonasson's 2009 novel The Hundred-Year-Old Man Who Climbed Out of the Window and Disappeared opens in Malmköping. The movie, however, is recorded in Munkedal, Bohuslän.
