= Åmmeberg =

- Location within Örebro Location within Sweden
- Coordinates: 58°52′N 15°00′E
- Country: Sweden
- Province: Närke
- County: Örebro County
- Municipality: Askersund Municipality

Area
  - Total: 2.12 km^{2} (0.82 sq mi)

Population (31 December 2010)
  - Total: 590
  - Density: 279/km^{2} (720/sq mi)
- Time zone: UTC+1 (CET)
  - Summer (DST): UTC+2 (CEST)

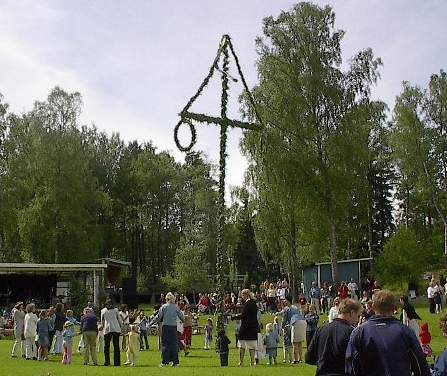
Dance around the maypole during the Midsummer celebration, in Åmmeberg, Sweden.

Åmmeberg is a locality situated in Askersund Municipality, Örebro County, Sweden with 590 inhabitants in 2010. It is situated at an estuary by a fjord of lake Vättern. It existed as early as the 12th century and had a mill owned by the convent in Riseberga. It was the regional centre of trade until the founding of Askersund.

The first Swedish female aviator, Elsa Andersson, died at age 24 outside Åmmeberg during a parachute jump 22 January 1922 (her third ever).

According to local tradition Queen Christina of Sweden was to confer upon Åmmeberg city privileges, but her carriage broke down in Askersund, and the queen who preferred not travel any further decided that Askersund was to have the city rights.

It was the port of the mining industry in Zinkgruvan, an industry started by a Belgian company Vieille Montagne 1857. The mine belongs to Lundin Mining since June 2004.

It is the summerhome of former Sweden's ambassador to Switzerland, the novelist Jan Mårtenson, and has a small harbour and a seaside-golf course.

== Riksdag elections ==
Åmmeberg is forming an electoral ward with nearby Zinkgruvan. While historically the area has been left-wing with an industrial and mining heritage, this has gradually been eroded in the 21st century, with the electoral ward going to the right-leaning parties for the first time in 2018.

Year	%	Votes	V	S	MP	C	L	KD	M	SD	NyD	Left	Right
1973	90.7	888	3.7	62.5		19.1	4.8	5.0	4.8			66.2	28.8
1976	90.5	906	2.0	61.3		22.4	5.0	2.6	6.7			63.2	34.1
1979	91.1	904	4.5	62.8		15.8	5.3	2.7	7.7			67.4	28.9
1982	92.2	951	5.0	63.9	1.1	12.8	3.3	3.3	10.7			68.9	26.8
1985	88.4	906	4.5	62.8	1.2	12.7	8.8		10.0			67.1	31.6
1988	88.0	859	5.8	62.7	4.2	8.0	7.2	3.5	8.4			72.8	23.6
1991	85.4	818	5.4	52.9	2.6	7.8	5.1	7.8	10.6		7.7	58.3	31.4
1994	87.5	856	8.8	62.4	2.8	5.8	4.4	3.2	12.0		0.6	73.9	25.5
1998	79.8	780	21.4	47.2	2.4	4.0	2.3	8.8	12.4			71.0	27.6
2002	80.3	758	14.6	48.7	2.0	5.5	8.7	6.2	10.8	2.4		65.3	31.3
2006	80.3	751	7.2	48.7	1.9	7.2	5.3	5.5	18.4	4.4		57.8	36.4
2010	80.3	743	4.3	41.0	3.1	4.2	5.5	4.2	28.9	7.9		48.5	42.8
2014	82.0	721	6.1	39.5	2.6	5.3	2.9	3.3	16.8	21.2		48.3	28.3
2018	83.9	812	5.4	33.0	1.2	6.3	3.6	4.2	15.8	30.0		45.9	53.6
