= Zinkgruvan =

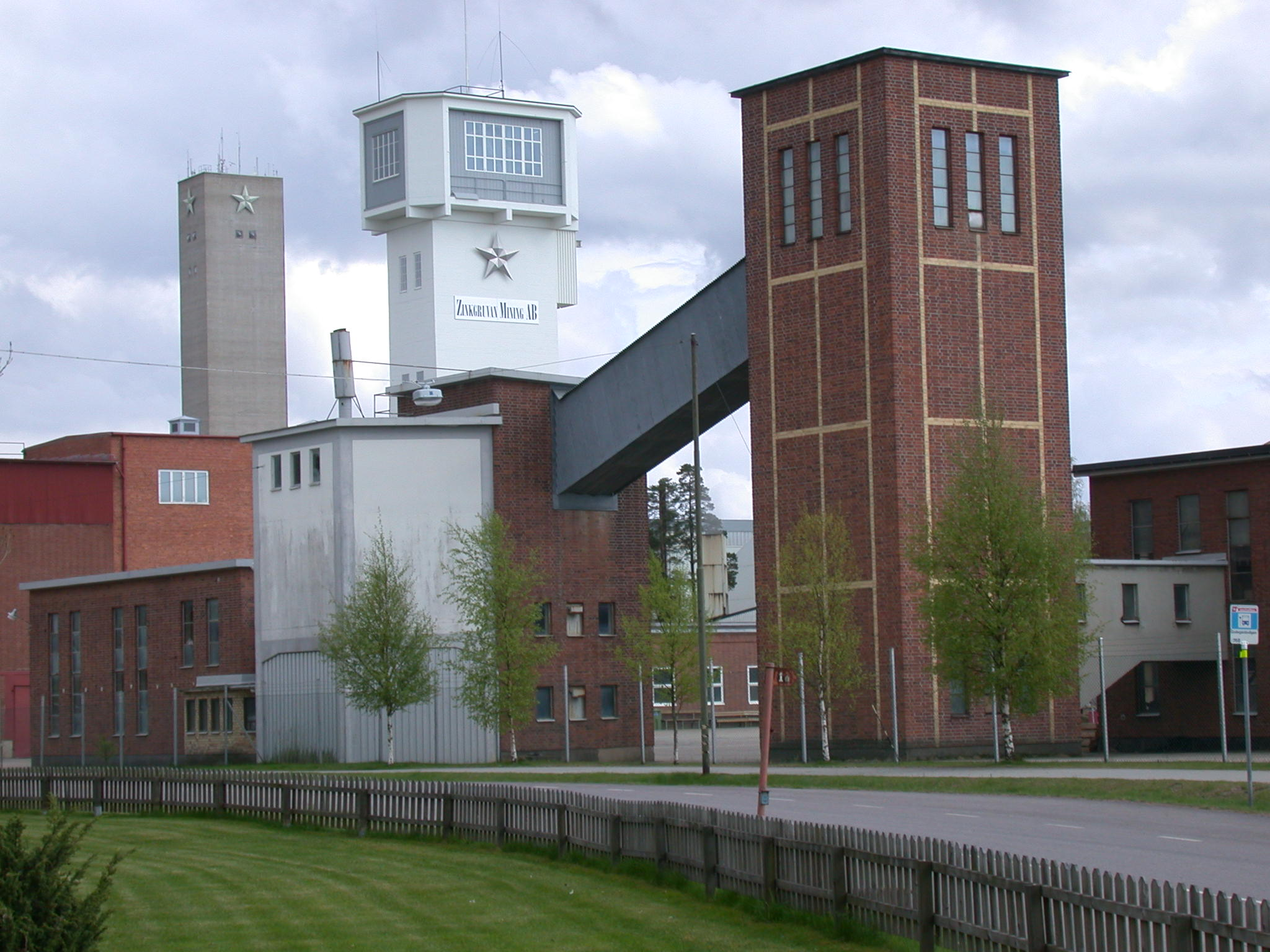
- Zinkgruvan zinc mine

- Location within Örebro Location within Sweden
- Coordinates: 58°49′N 15°05′E
- Country: Sweden
- Province: Närke
- County: Örebro County
- Municipality: Askersund Municipality

Area
  - Total: 2.25 km^{2} (0.87 sq mi)

Population (31 December 2010)
  - Total: 391
  - Density: 174/km^{2} (450/sq mi)
- Time zone: UTC+1 (CET)
  - Summer (DST): UTC+2 (CEST)

Zinkgruvan is a locality situated in Askersund Municipality, Örebro County, Sweden. It had 391 inhabitants in 2010.

It is situated close to Sweden's second largest lake, Vättern. The village is famous for its mining industry started by the Belgian company Vieille Montagne in 1857, hence the name Zinkgruvan (literally "the zinc mine" in English). Zinkgruvan was founded around the mine in the 1860s, and the history of the village is closely tied to the history of the mine. The people living in Zinkgruvan are mostly mine workers.

Zinkgruvan also contains several ski facilities, including an illuminated cross country ski track. The ski association in Zinkgruvan uses snow cannons to ensure that the ski-track is provided with snow during the entire winter. An old ice hockey rink in the village is filled with ice in the winter for public entertainment. Zinkgruvan is home to a museum that documents the history of the mining industry in the town.

== Riksdag elections ==
Zinkgruvan is forming an electoral ward with nearby Åmmeberg. While historically the area has been heavily left-wing due to the mining works, this has gradually been eroded in the 21st century, with the electoral ward going to the right-leaning parties for the first time in 2018.

Year	%	Votes	V	S	MP	C	L	KD	M	SD	NyD	Left	Right
1973	90.7	888	3.7	62.5		19.1	4.8	5.0	4.8			66.2	28.8
1976	90.5	906	2.0	61.3		22.4	5.0	2.6	6.7			63.2	34.1
1979	91.1	904	4.5	62.8		15.8	5.3	2.7	7.7			67.4	28.9
1982	92.2	951	5.0	63.9	1.1	12.8	3.3	3.3	10.7			68.9	26.8
1985	88.4	906	4.5	62.8	1.2	12.7	8.8		10.0			67.1	31.6
1988	88.0	859	5.8	62.7	4.2	8.0	7.2	3.5	8.4			72.8	23.6
1991	85.4	818	5.4	52.9	2.6	7.8	5.1	7.8	10.6		7.7	58.3	31.4
1994	87.5	856	8.8	62.4	2.8	5.8	4.4	3.2	12.0		0.6	73.9	25.5
1998	79.8	780	21.4	47.2	2.4	4.0	2.3	8.8	12.4			71.0	27.6
2002	80.3	758	14.6	48.7	2.0	5.5	8.7	6.2	10.8	2.4		65.3	31.3
2006	80.3	751	7.2	48.7	1.9	7.2	5.3	5.5	18.4	4.4		57.8	36.4
2010	80.3	743	4.3	41.0	3.1	4.2	5.5	4.2	28.9	7.9		48.5	42.8
2014	82.0	721	6.1	39.5	2.6	5.3	2.9	3.3	16.8	21.2		48.3	28.3
2018	83.9	812	5.4	33.0	1.2	6.3	3.6	4.2	15.8	30.0		45.9	53.6

== Geography ==
In addition to Vättern, the area around Zinkgruvan contains several minor lakes. Zinkgruvan, as many small villages in Sweden, is popular with German tourists during the summer. Tourist attractions include the natural surroundings of the town and the elk that live nearby. Selling accessories and souvenirs to tourists is a major source of income for residents of Zinkgruvan. The headframe of the mine, containing the elevators that move miners and ore in the mine shaft, is a major landmark in the village and is well over 70m high. While some residents regard it as a unique feature of the town, it has been criticized for its Soviet-style architecture.

Climate data for Zinkgruvan 1981-2010
Month	Jan	Feb	Mar	Apr	May	Jun	Jul	Aug	Sep	Oct	Nov	Dec	Year
Mean daily maximum °C (°F)	−1.4 (29.5)	−1.4 (29.5)	2.9 (37.2)	8.8 (47.8)	15.3 (59.5)	19.4 (66.9)	20.3 (68.5)	19.5 (67.1)	14.5 (58.1)	9.3 (48.7)	3.4 (38.1)	−0.1 (31.8)	9.2 (48.6)
Daily mean °C (°F)	−4.1 (24.6)	−4.3 (24.3)	−1.1 (30.0)	3.5 (38.3)	9.8 (49.6)	14.3 (57.7)	15.4 (59.7)	14.6 (58.3)	10.1 (50.2)	5.9 (42.6)	0.9 (33.6)	−2.4 (27.7)	5.2 (41.4)
Mean daily minimum °C (°F)	−6.8 (19.8)	−7.2 (19.0)	−5.1 (22.8)	−1.7 (28.9)	4.3 (39.7)	9.2 (48.6)	10.5 (50.9)	9.8 (49.6)	5.7 (42.3)	2.5 (36.5)	−1.6 (29.1)	−4.8 (23.4)	1.2 (34.2)

== See also ==
- Broken Hill ore deposit (Australia)
