= Mellösa =

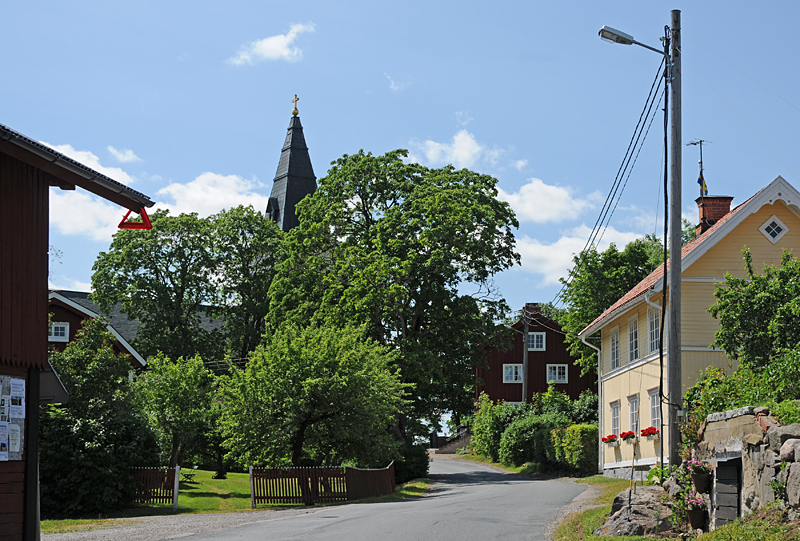
- Mellösa Village

- Location within Södermanland Location within Sweden
- Coordinates: 59°06′N 16°33′E
- Country: Sweden
- Province: Södermanland
- County: Södermanland County
- Municipality: Flen Municipality

Area
  - Total: 0.87 km^{2} (0.34 sq mi)

Population (31 December 2020)
  - Total: 544
  - Density: 630/km^{2} (1,600/sq mi)
- Time zone: UTC+1 (CET)
  - Summer (DST): UTC+2 (CEST)

Mellösa (Swedish pronunciation: [ˈmɛ̂ˌlːøːsa], locally [ˈmɛ̂lːsa]) is a locality situated in Flen Municipality, Södermanland County, Sweden. It had 535 inhabitants in 2010. In 2001, Mellösa became the first book town in Sweden.

== Landmarks ==
- Mellösa Church

== Riksdag elections ==
Year	%	Votes	V	S	MP	C	L	KD	M	SD	NyD	Left	Right
1973	89.8	742	3.5	41.1		37.1	8.9	1.5	8.0			44.6	53.9
1976	93.3	816	3.7	39.6		37.5	9.1	1.2	8.9			43.3	55.5
1979	92.1	837	3.6	40.5		29.5	8.4	1.3	16.2			44.1	54.1
1982	93.7	872	4.9	41.7	2.8	25.9	5.4	1.5	17.8			46.7	49.1
1985	92.2	848	5.0	42.2	2.7	22.5	11.8		15.3			47.2	49.6
1988	90.9	821	6.3	42.9	6.2	20.3	9.3	2.7	12.2			55.4	41.8
1991	87.6	826	5.0	36.3	4.0	17.1	9.1	8.0	13.3		6.9	41.3	47.5
1994	88.7	842	6.8	45.7	6.2	12.7	6.3	3.7	16.3		1.1	58.7	39.0
1998	84.4	745	11.1	37.6	6.3	10.6	3.8	10.2	17.4			55.0	42.0
2002	88.0	774	7.5	44.3	5.4	11.1	9.2	7.9	11.8	1.8		57.2	39.9
2006	86.5	790	5.6	39.6	5.4	13.2	5.6	5.8	19.7	3.0		50.6	44.3
2010	87.4	779	4.1	32.2	6.4	13.0	4.1	4.5	28.5	6.7		42.7	50.1
2014	87.6	775	5.7	28.3	4.6	12.5	3.7	4.0	18.6	19.6		38.6	38.8
2018	88.3	788	7.4	26.1	3.0	12.7	4.4	5.8	17.0	22.0		49.2	49.2
