= Sörmlandsleden =

Hiking trail in Södermanland, Sweden

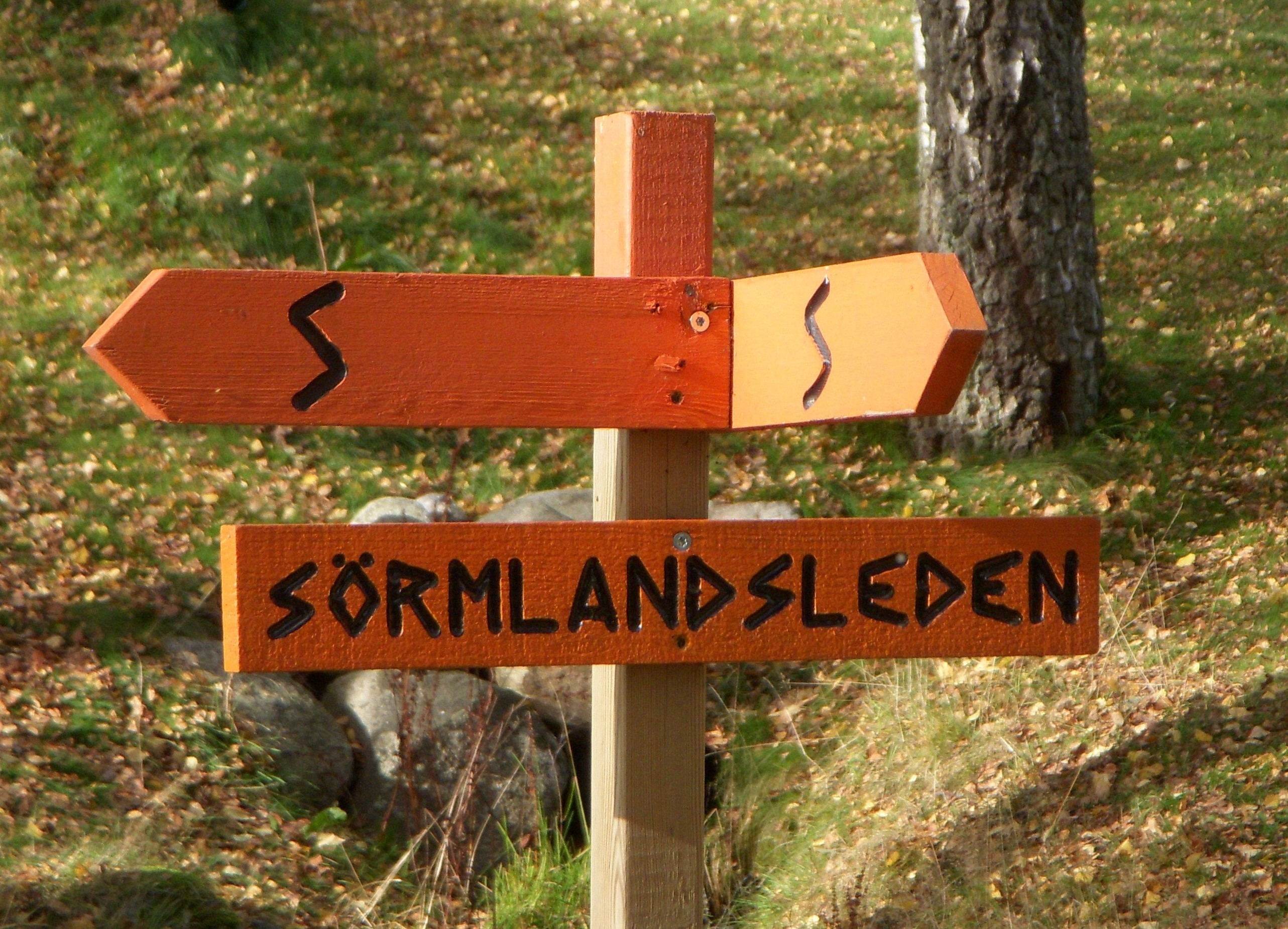
- One of many trail signs in the route.
- Length: 1,000 kilometres (620 mi) approximately
- Location: Södermanland, Sweden
- Trailheads: Björkhagen
- Use: Hiking
- Season: All year

Sörmlandsleden ("Sörmland trail")" is a system of hiking trails covering a total of approximately 1,000 kilometres (620 mi) of walking paths in Södermanland, south of Stockholm, Sweden.

The trails pass through several nature reserves, areas of cultural tradition and several historical monuments.

== Route and description ==
The trail begins in Björkhagen, Stockholm and passes through several places like Stockholm, Nynäshamn, Södertälje, Trosa, Nyköping, Oxelösund, Katrineholm, Hälleforsnäs and Malmköping. It also has several branches that go to places like Flen, Eskilstuna, Gnesta and Mariefred.

The trails also pass through Tyresta National Park, Nackareservatet, Paradiset Nature Reserve, Stora Träsket Nature Reserve, Linudden Nature Reserve, Stora Bötet Nature Reserve, Strandstuviken Nature Reserve and Tullgarn Nature Reserve.

The trail is either marked with orange coloured rings around trees or using poles and signs with symbols or the letter "S" on an orange background. The trails pass through several sorts of terrain with different grade of difficulty.

Along the trails are rest areas, lean-tos, campsites, log cabins and other shelters. There are several springs to refill with drinking water.

The trails are divided into over 100 sections. The length of a section varies between 3 and 17 km (11 mi), most commonly around 10 km (6 mi).

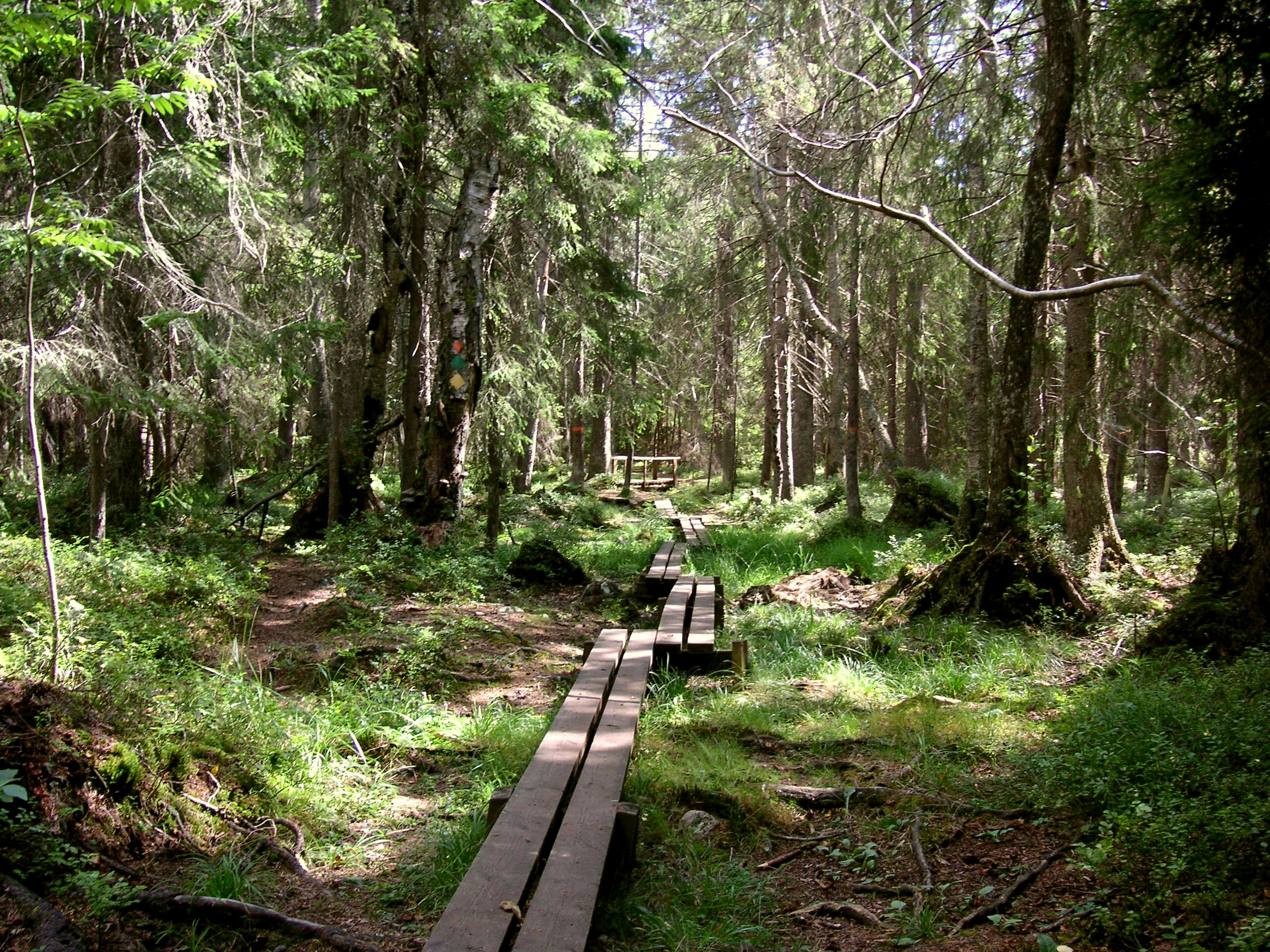
The trail in Paradisets nature reserve.
