= Rönneshytta =

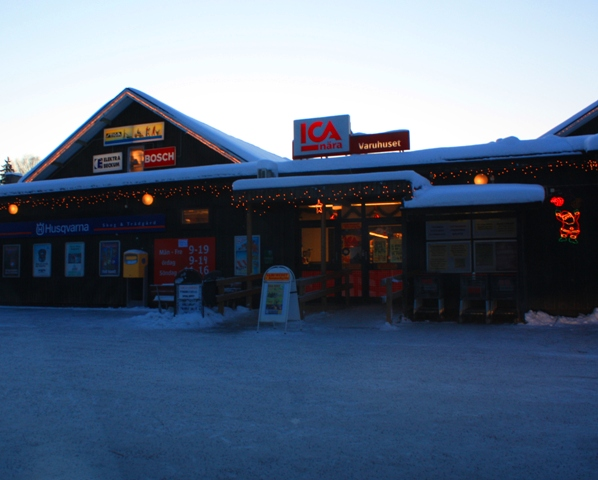
- Rönneshytta

- Location within Örebro Location within Sweden
- Coordinates: 58°56′N 15°02′E
- Country: Sweden
- Province: Närke
- County: Örebro County
- Municipality: Askersund Municipality

Area
  - Total: 0.71 km^{2} (0.27 sq mi)

Population (31 December 2010)
  - Total: 283
  - Density: 397/km^{2} (1,030/sq mi)
- Time zone: UTC+1 (CET)
  - Summer (DST): UTC+2 (CEST)

Rönneshytta is a locality situated in Askersund Municipality, Örebro County, Sweden with 283 inhabitants in 2010.
