= Vibyholm Castle =

17th century Swedish manor house

Coordinates: 58°59′30″N 16°51′51″E

- Årdala, Flen Municipality, Sweden
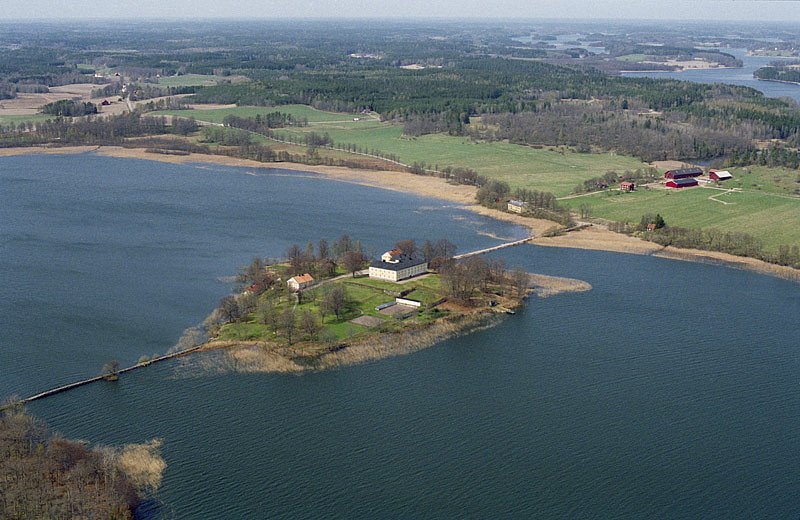
- Vibyholm on Båven

Site information
- Type: Castle

Site history
- Built: 1622-1626
- Built by: Casper van Panten

Vibyholm Castle (Swedish: Vibyholms slott) is a manor house at Årdala, Flen Municipality, Sweden. The main building is located on an island in Lake Båven.

== History ==
Vibyholm was built between 1622 and 1630 in Dutch High Renaissance style under design by Dutch architect Caspar van Panten (1585-1630). Restoration was made in 1798 following drawings by Swedish architect Carl Christoffer Gjörwell (1766-1837). In the middle of the 19th century, restoration to the house was undertaken under the direction of Swedish architect Lars Jacob von Röök (1778-1867).

== See also ==
- List of castles in Sweden
