= Brevens bruk =

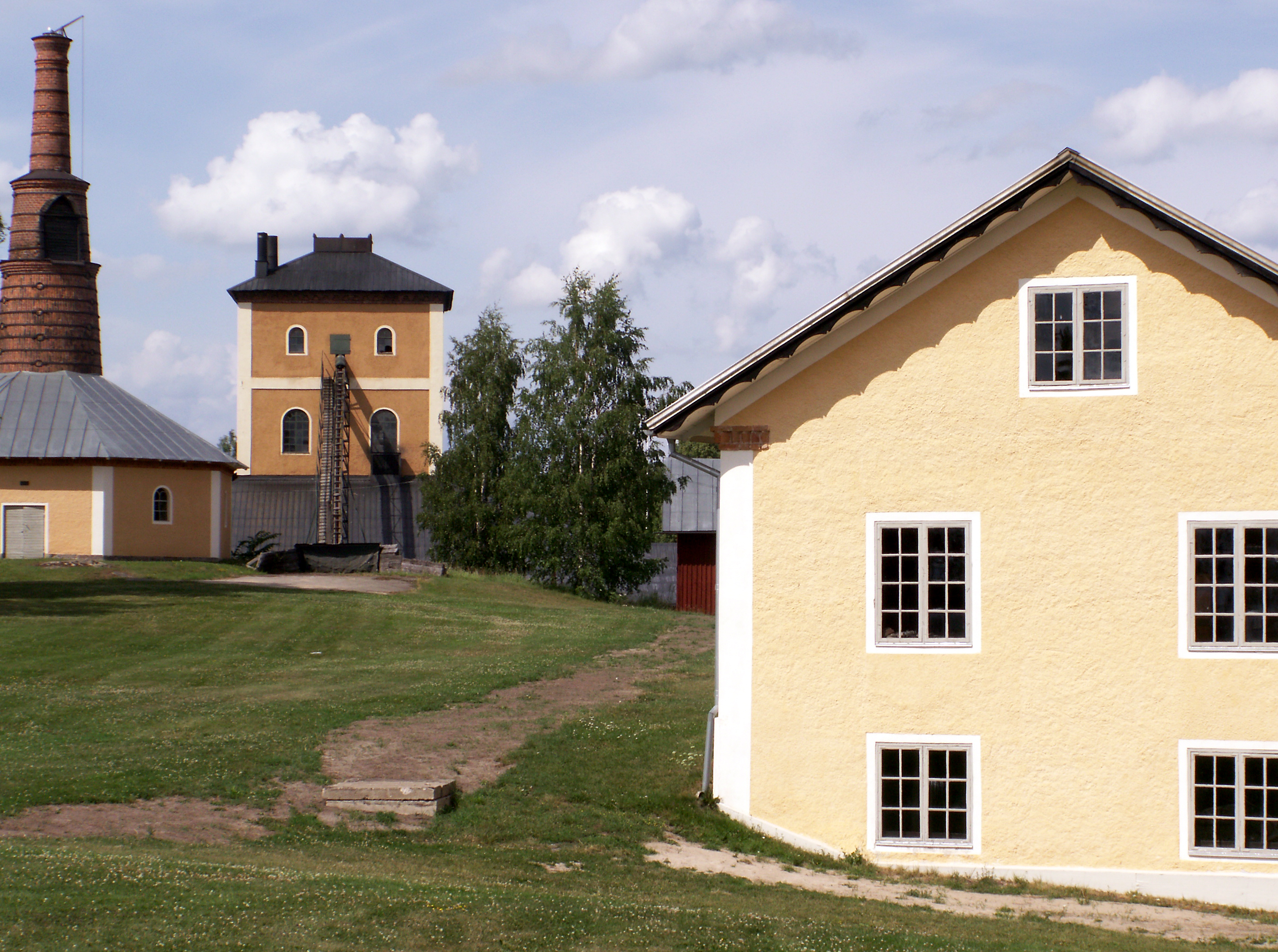
- Brevens bruk
- Interactive map of Brevens bruk
- Coordinates: 59°04′N 15°31′E
- Country: Sweden
- Province: Närke
- County: Örebro County
- Municipality: Örebro Municipality

Area
  - Total: 0.79 km^{2} (0.31 sq mi)

Population (2007-12-31)
  - Total: 121
  - Density: 0/km^{2} (0/sq mi)
- Time zone: UTC+1 (CET)
  - Summer (DST): UTC+2 (CEST)

Brevens bruk is a minor locality in Örebro Municipality, Örebro County, Sweden. 121 people were living there in 2007. Brevens bruk is located near the tripoint of Örebro, Södermanland and Östergötland counties. It is situated in a tri-village area more or less halfway on the road between Högsjö across the Sörmlandic border and Kilsmo to its north. It is famous for a traditional Swedish midsummer celebration held every year. Thousands of people from neighbouring areas gather and celebrate. The celebration has drawn attention all the way to Germany and hundreds of German tourists share in the celebration.

== Riksdag elections ==
Year	%	Votes	V	S	MP	C	L	KD	M	SD	NyD	Left	Right
1973	94.7	604	0.5	58.3		25.3	7.0	5.0	4.0			58.8	36.3
1976	93.5	586	2.0	53.8		27.5	6.8	5.5	4.3			55.8	38.6
1979	73.4	444	2.3	48.2		28.8	5.6	5.6	7.9			50.5	42.3
1982	68.9	404	3.0	53.7	1.5	25.0	3.7	7.4	5.7			56.7	34.4
1985	68.6	380	4.2	49.7	1.6	25.8	10.8		5.5			53.9	42.1
1988	71.8	378	4.5	46.6	3.2	20.4	13.0	7.7	4.0			51.1	37.3
1991	72.9	394	5.3	42.9	2.3	15.2	8.6	10.7	7.6		6.9	48.2	42.1
1994	73.5	388	10.3	51.8	5.4	10.6	6.2	5.7	8.2		1.3	67.5	30.7
1998	82.3	425	13.4	45.6	6.1	7.5	1.9	10.1	10.4			65.2	29.9
2002	80.8	395	8.1	49.4	5.1	9.6	7.3	10.1	6.6	1.3		62.5	33.7
2006	83.2	403	3.7	47.1	4.5	9.9	6.0	6.7	13.2	5.5		55.3	35.7
2010	79.8	394	5.6	43.9	3.3	9.4	6.3	5.3	18.0	7.6		52.8	39.1
2014	80.2	395	7.3	34.7	4.1	8.4	3.8	5.3	11.6	21.3		46.1	29.1
2018	80.5	402	8.5	30.8	1.7	8.2	3.5	5.7	10.0	30.3		49.3	49.5
