= Strandstuviken Nature Reserve =

Nature reserve in Södermanland, Sweden

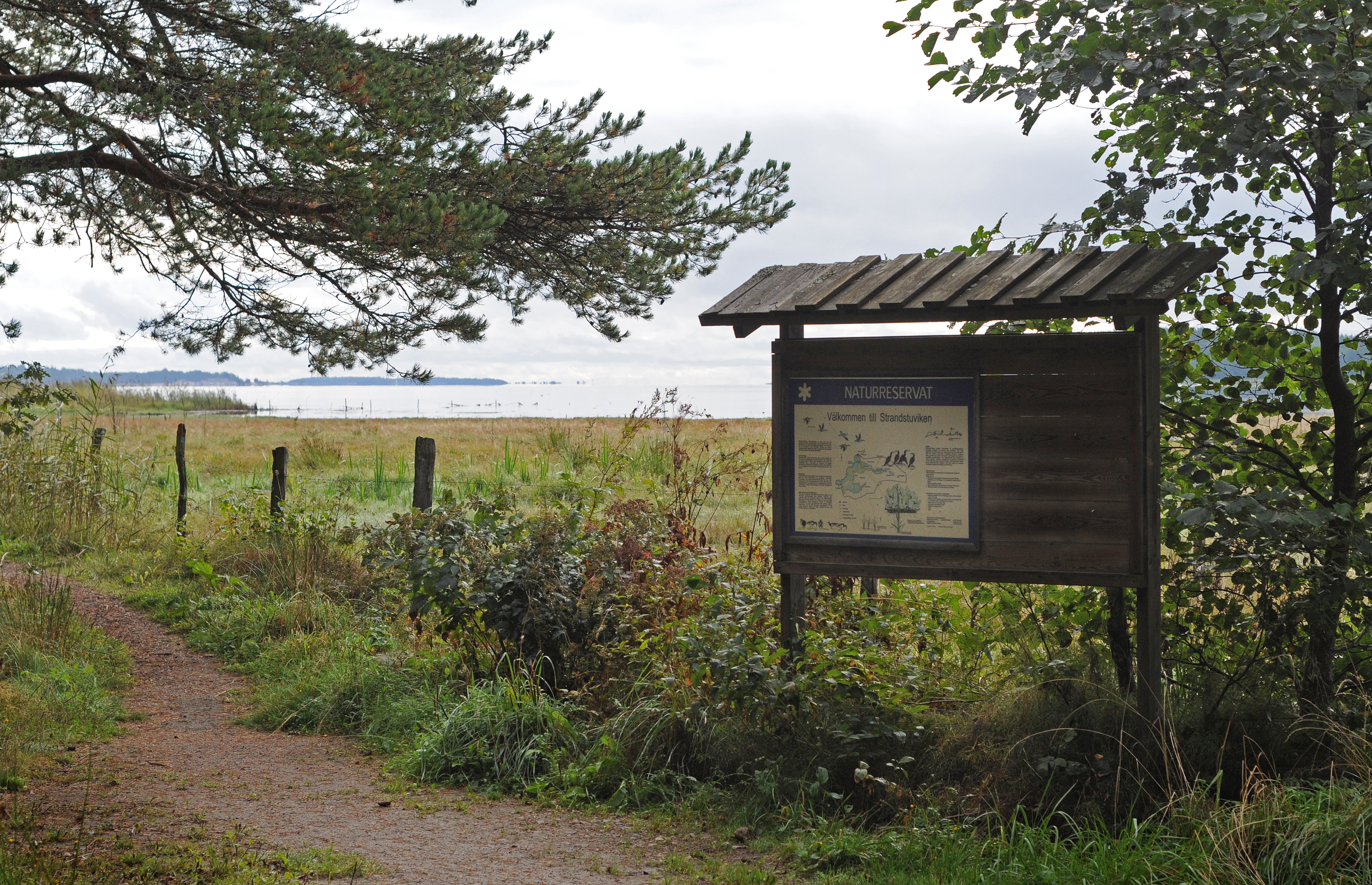
- Entrance to the nature reserve

- Location within Södermanland
- Location: Sweden
- Nearest city: Nyköping
- Coordinates: 58°42′28″N 17°06′18″E
- Area: 990 ha (2,400 acres)
- Established: 1989

Strandstuviken Nature Reserve (Swedish: Strandstuvikens naturreservat) is a nature reserve in Södermanland County in Sweden. It is part of the EU-wide Natura 2000-network.

The nature reserve lies along a stretch the Baltic Sea coast and is one of the most important stop-over areas for migratory birds. It consists of several narrow spits, shallow bays and beach meadows, as well as a variation of forest types further inland. Sörmlandsleden passes through the reserve.

== Bird-life ==
Strandstuviken Nature Reserve is first and foremost an important area for resting migratory birds, and is well known by local ornithologists; in the northern part of the nature reserve there is an observation tower for the convenience of bird-watchers. The bird-fauna of the area is among the best documented in the entire county. Among the birds that use the nature reserve as a stop-over are tufted duck, common pochard, greater scaup, common goldeneye, northern pintail, Eurasian wigeon, mute swan, whooper swan, goosander and smew, as well as almost all types of waders found in Sweden. In addition, certain species use the area as a breeding ground: such species include raven, little ringed plover and grey heron.

== Flora ==
The nature reserve also provides a habitat for some unusual plants. Sesleria caerulea and Gentianella uliginosa are examples of plants that thrive in this landscape, which is of a type that is becoming less and less common.
