= Ernfrid Bogstedt =

Swedish artist

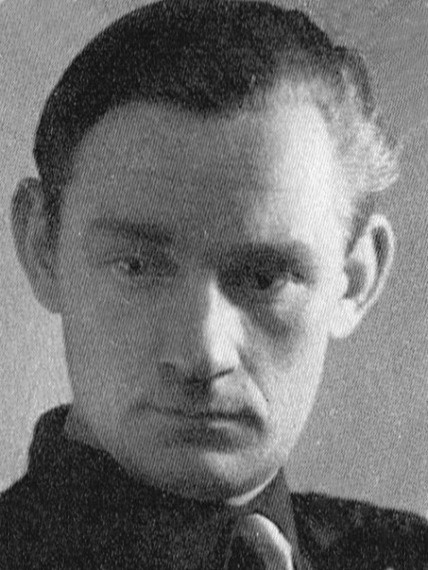
- Born: Oskar Ernfrid Bogstedt; 8 January 1908; Björkvik, Sweden
- Died: 17 August 1989 (aged 81); Stockholm, Sweden
- Resting place: Skogskyrkogården, Stockholm
- Occupation: Artist
- Spouse: Edit Bogstedt
- Parent(s): Augusta Bogstedt (née Sjögren) (1885-1953); Oskar Bogstedt (1879-1968)
- Family: Margareta (1902–1992) (sister); Märtha (1904–1976) (sister); Karin (1905–1905) (sister); Helga (1906–1906) (sister); Alford (1910–1969) (brother); Alfhild (1912–1999) (sister); Bernt (1915–1976) (brother); Gunvor (1916–2002) (sister); Britta (1918–2016) (sister); Maj-Li (1922–1975) (sister); Manfred (1925–2012) (brother); Ulla (1928–2017) (sister)

Oskar Ernfrid Bogstedt (8 January 1908 – 17 August 1989) was a Swedish artist. Bogstedt had exhibits together with Beppe Wolgers. He was related to the musician Stefan Bogstedt.
