= Stora Bötet Nature Reserve =

Nature reserve in Södermanland, Sweden

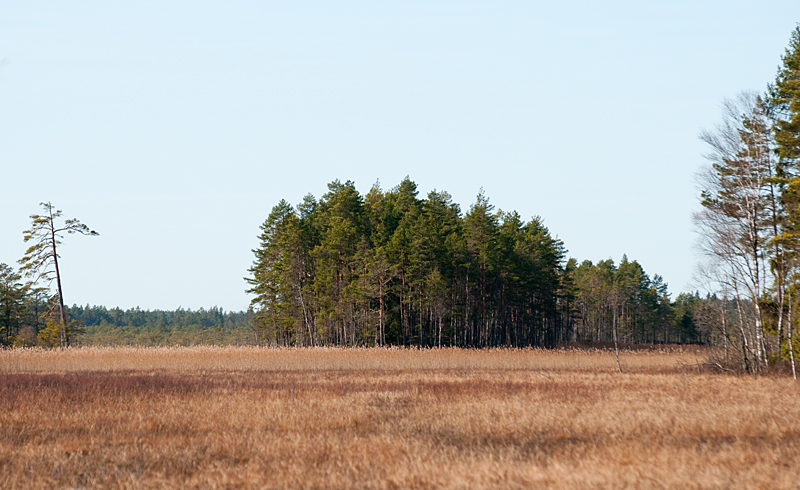

- Location within Södermanland
- Location: Sweden
- Nearest city: Nyköping
- Coordinates: 58°40′48″N 16°46′58″E
- Area: 324.4 ha (802 acres)
- Established: 1997

Stora Bötet Nature Reserve (Swedish: Stora Bötets naturreservat) is a nature reserve in Södermanland County in Sweden. It is part of the EU-wide Natura 2000-network.

The nature reserve serves to protect one of the largest bogs in the Södermanland County. The bog has a sparse vegetation, consisting mainly of Scots pine, Marsh Labrador tea and bog bilberry. The bog has a rich bird-life, with the black grouse using the area for their annual mating ritual. Different species of waders and ducks can also be found in the nature reserve, as well as owls in certain years. Sörmlandsleden passes through the nature reserve.
