= Skebokvarn =

- Location within Södermanland Location within Sweden
- Coordinates: 59°04′N 16°42′E
- Country: Sweden
- Province: Södermanland
- County: Södermanland County
- Municipality: Flen Municipality

Area
  - Total: 0.61 km^{2} (0.24 sq mi)

Population (31 December 2020)
  - Total: 204
  - Density: 330/km^{2} (870/sq mi)
- Time zone: UTC+1 (CET)
  - Summer (DST): UTC+2 (CEST)

Skebokvarn is a village situated in Flen Municipality, Södermanland County, Sweden with 218 inhabitants in 2005.
