= Sparreholm =

- Location within Södermanland Location within Sweden
- Coordinates: 59°04′N 16°49′E
- Country: Sweden
- Province: Södermanland
- County: Södermanland County
- Municipality: Flen Municipality

Area
  - Total: 1.16 km^{2} (0.45 sq mi)

Population (31 December 2020)
  - Total: 739
  - Density: 637/km^{2} (1,650/sq mi)
- Time zone: UTC+1 (CET)
  - Summer (DST): UTC+2 (CEST)

Sparreholm is a locality situated in Flen Municipality, Södermanland County, Sweden with 741 inhabitants in 2010.

== Riksdag elections ==
Year	%	Votes	V	S	MP	C	L	KD	M	SD	NyD	Left	Right
1973	92.6	1,542	3.2	41.6		34.4	6.1	1.5	13.0			44.8	53.5
1976	92.6	1,468	1.8	43.3		35.3	6.9	0.5	12.1			45.1	54.3
1979	91.8	1,444	4.4	42.8		27.9	8.4	0.8	15.1			47.2	51.5
1982	91.2	1,405	3.8	44.1	1.6	25.5	4.1	0.6	19.7			47.9	49.3
1985	90.2	1,383	3.0	45.2	2.7	19.1	10.2		19.2			48.2	48.4
1988	86.3	1,297	4.3	41.6	7.0	18.8	8.6	1.7	17.0			53.0	44.4
1991	85.9	1,286	3.9	37.1	3.8	15.5	6.3	5.4	20.6		6.9	41.0	47.7
1994	87.5	1,330	5.9	43.5	5.9	13.6	3.9	2.8	22.0		1.4	55.4	42.3
1998	80.1	1,204	10.0	36.5	5.8	9.2	2.9	13.0	21.5			52.3	46.7
2002	79.9	1,153	8.8	39.0	4.0	10.4	9.2	9.9	16.1	1.9		51.9	45.6
2006	81.6	1,191	5.0	40.7	4.1	11.3	6.1	6.4	22.6	2.8		49.8	46.4
2010	84.0	1,200	4.9	33.4	5.4	10.2	4.9	4.3	29.1	6.3		43.8	48.4
2014	85.3	1,236	6.2	30.3	4.0	11.1	4.0	3.6	20.3	18.1		40.5	39.1
2018	85.3	1,117	6.4	26.9	3.1	9.9	3.7	6.2	19.6	22.9		46.3	52.4
