= Linudden Nature Reserve =

Nature reserve in Södermanland, Sweden

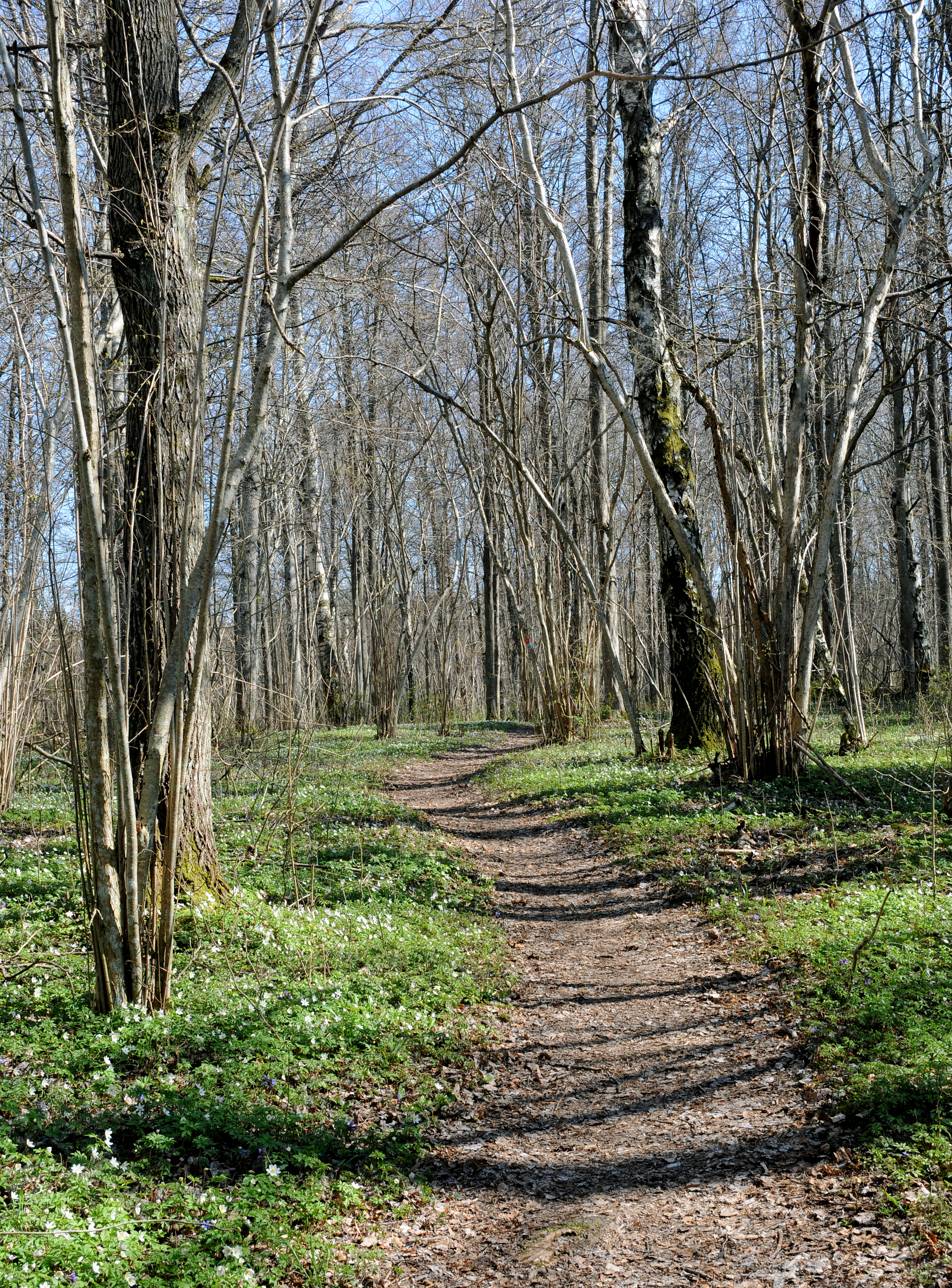

- Location within Södermanland
- Location: Sweden
- Nearest city: Nyköping
- Coordinates: 58°43′57″N 17°05′19″E
- Area: 11 ha (27 acres)
- Established: 1947

Linudden Nature Reserve (Swedish: Linuddens naturreservat) is a nature reserve in Södermanland County in Sweden. It is part of the EU-wide Natura 2000-network.

The purpose of the nature reserve is to preserve an area of mixed broadleaf forest dominated by birch, aspen, linden and common hazel. The flora contains species such as unspotted lungwort, Viola mirabilis, common toothwort and giant bellflower. The nature reserve also has a rich bird-life, rich in Old World warblers but the nature reserve also serves as a habitat for species such as nightingale, Eurasian wryneck and different kinds of woodpeckers. Sörmlandsleden passes through the nature reserve.
