= Stora Träsket Nature Reserve =

Nature reserve in Stockholm, Sweden

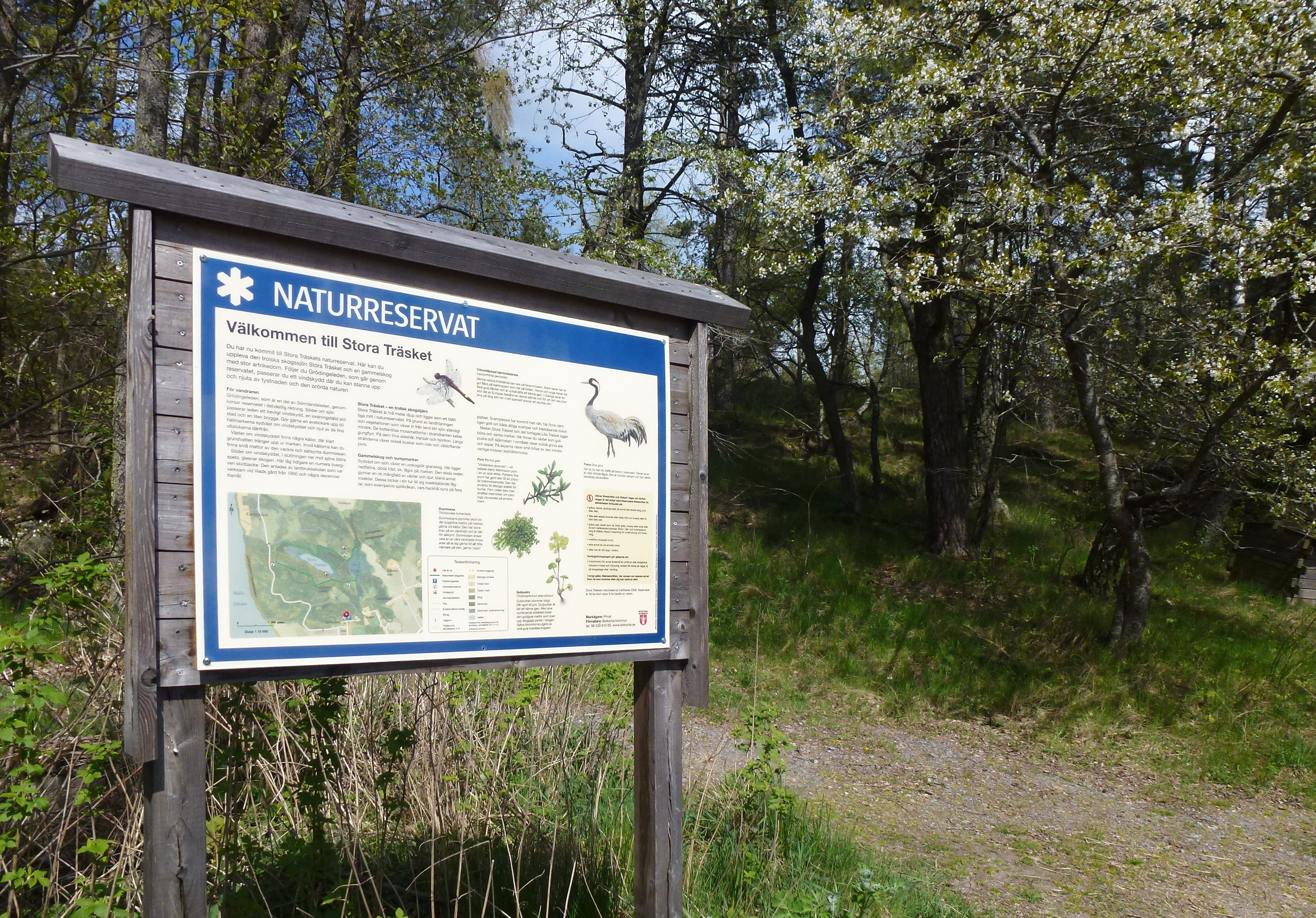

- Location within Stockholm
- Location: Sweden
- Nearest city: Södertälje
- Coordinates: 59°07′11″N 17°42′33″E

Stora Träsket Nature Reserve (Swedish: Stora Träskets naturreservat) is a nature reserve in Botkyrka Municipality close to Stockholm, Sweden.

The nature reserve protects an area of wildlife around the lake Stora Träsket. The lake, with a maximum depth of 2 metres (6.6 ft) is naturally becoming smaller with time, supporting large areas of reeds and floating mats at its fringes. These areas are a habitat for, among other species, the orchid Hammarbya paludosa and several species of sundew. On land, the lake is surrounded by old-growth forest containing several species which are used to identify areas of high ecological value; these include Goodyera repens, Chimaphila umbellata and Geastrum pectinatum, among others.

The hiking trail Sörmlandsleden passes through the nature reserve.
