= Båven =

Lake in Nyköping Municipality, Södermanland County, Sweden

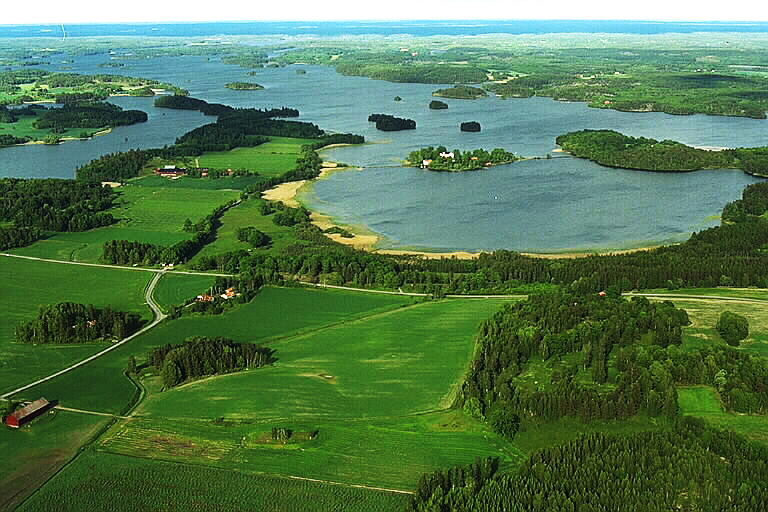

- Location within Sweden
- Coordinates: 59°1′0″N 16°56′31″E
- Basin countries: Sweden

Båven (Swedish pronunciation: [ˈbǒːvɛn]) is a lake in the municipalities of Flen, Gnesta, and Nyköping in Södermanland, Sweden. The lake is characterized by branches and many islands, with over 500 km of shoreline. Around Båven there are a number of estates and manors, including Sparreholm, Vibyholm and Rockelstad.

The lake has relatively clean water and a rich bird life with many bird protection areas. The lake is one of the few aquatic habitats in Sweden inhabited by the wels catfish.
