= Kolsnaren =

Lake in Vingåker Municipality, Sweden

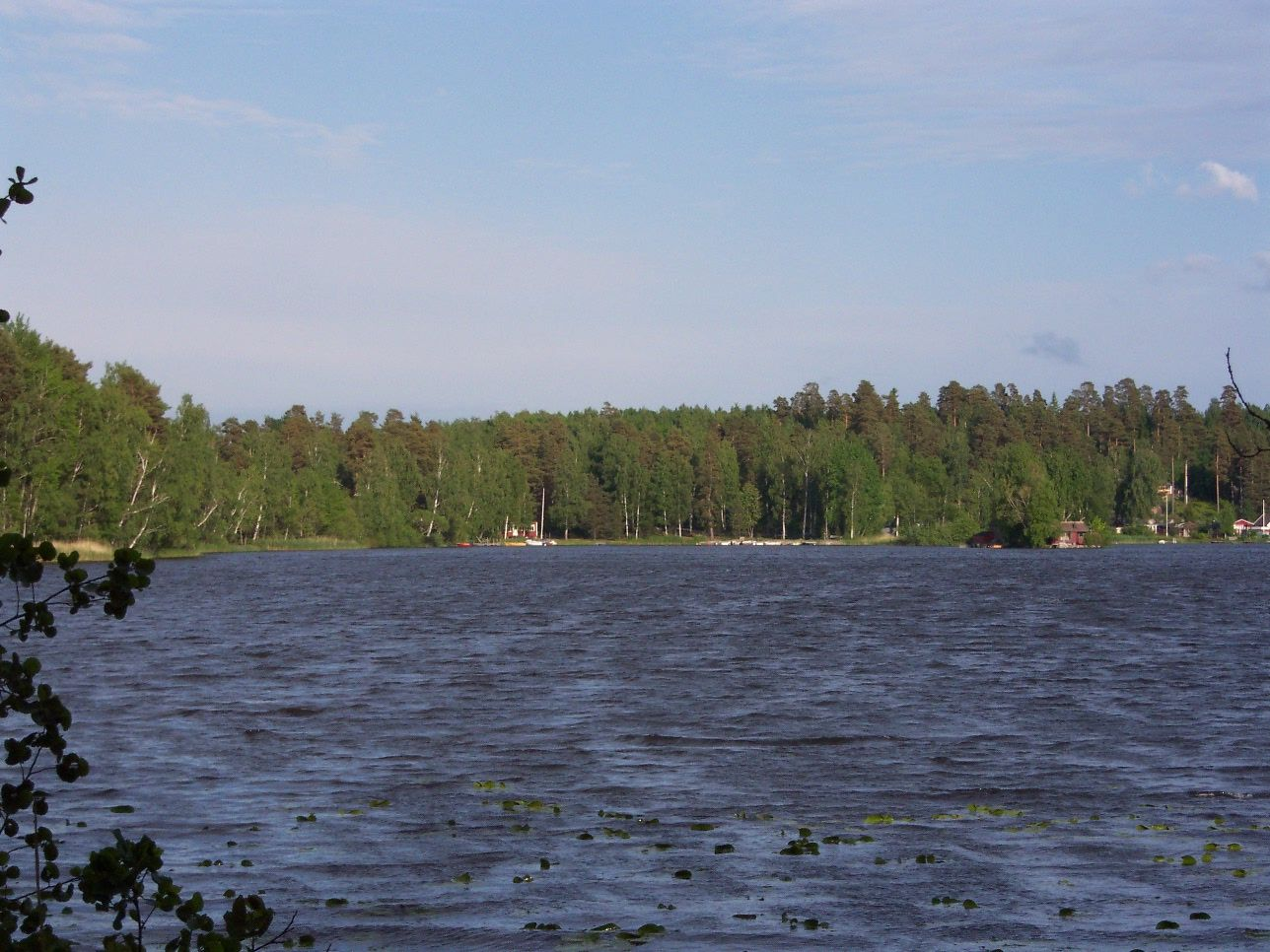

- Location within Södermanland
- Coordinates: 59°02′N 16°01′E
- Basin countries: Sweden

Kolsnaren (Swedish pronunciation: [ˈkôːlsnarɛn] or [ˈkôːlsnaɳ]) is a lake in Södermanland, Sweden.
