= Åsbro =

- Location within Örebro Location within Sweden
- Coordinates: 59°00′N 15°03′E
- Country: Sweden
- Province: Närke
- County: Örebro County
- Municipality: Askersund Municipality

Area
  - Total: 2.17 km^{2} (0.84 sq mi)

Population (31 December 2010)
  - Total: 1,164
  - Density: 536/km^{2} (1,390/sq mi)
- Time zone: UTC+1 (CET)
  - Summer (DST): UTC+2 (CEST)

Åsbro is a locality situated in Askersund Municipality, Örebro County, Sweden with 1,164 inhabitants in 2010.
