= Kilsmo =

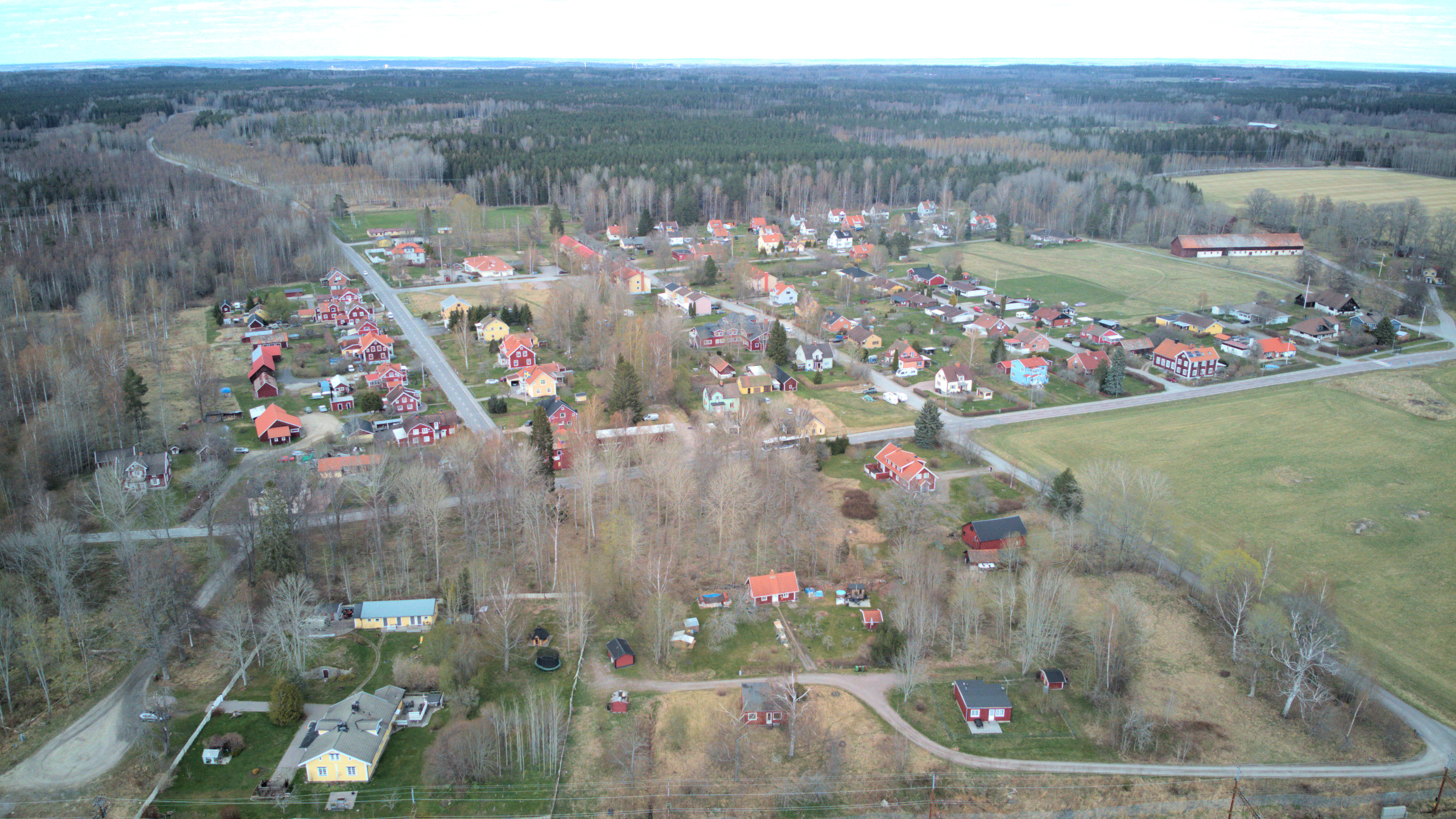

- Location within Örebro Location within Sweden
- Coordinates: 59°04′N 15°31′E
- Country: Sweden
- Province: Närke
- County: Örebro County
- Municipality: Örebro Municipality

Area
  - Total: 0.50 km^{2} (0.19 sq mi)

Population (31 December 2010)
  - Total: 263
  - Density: 526/km^{2} (1,360/sq mi)
- Time zone: UTC+1 (CET)
  - Summer (DST): UTC+2 (CEST)

Kilsmo is a locality situated in Örebro Municipality, Örebro County, Sweden with 263 inhabitants in 2010.

== Riksdag elections ==
Year	%	Votes	V	S	MP	C	L	KD	M	SD	NyD	Left	Right
1973	94.7	604	0.5	58.3		25.3	7.0	5.0	4.0			58.8	36.3
1976	93.5	586	2.0	53.8		27.5	6.8	5.5	4.3			55.8	38.6
1979	73.4	444	2.3	48.2		28.8	5.6	5.6	7.9			50.5	42.3
1982	68.9	404	3.0	53.7	1.5	25.0	3.7	7.4	5.7			56.7	34.4
1985	68.6	380	4.2	49.7	1.6	25.8	10.8		5.5			53.9	42.1
1988	71.8	378	4.5	46.6	3.2	20.4	13.0	7.7	4.0			51.1	37.3
1991	72.9	394	5.3	42.9	2.3	15.2	8.6	10.7	7.6		6.9	48.2	42.1
1994	73.5	388	10.3	51.8	5.4	10.6	6.2	5.7	8.2		1.3	67.5	30.7
1998	82.3	425	13.4	45.6	6.1	7.5	1.9	10.1	10.4			65.2	29.9
2002	80.8	395	8.1	49.4	5.1	9.6	7.3	10.1	6.6	1.3		62.5	33.7
2006	83.2	403	3.7	47.1	4.5	9.9	6.0	6.7	13.2	5.5		55.3	35.7
2010	79.8	394	5.6	43.9	3.3	9.4	6.3	5.3	18.0	7.6		52.8	39.1
2014	80.2	395	7.3	34.7	4.1	8.4	3.8	5.3	11.6	21.3		46.1	29.1
2018	80.5	402	8.5	30.8	1.7	8.2	3.5	5.7	10.0	30.3		49.3	49.5
