= Tisnaren =

Lake in Katrineholm Municipality, Sweden

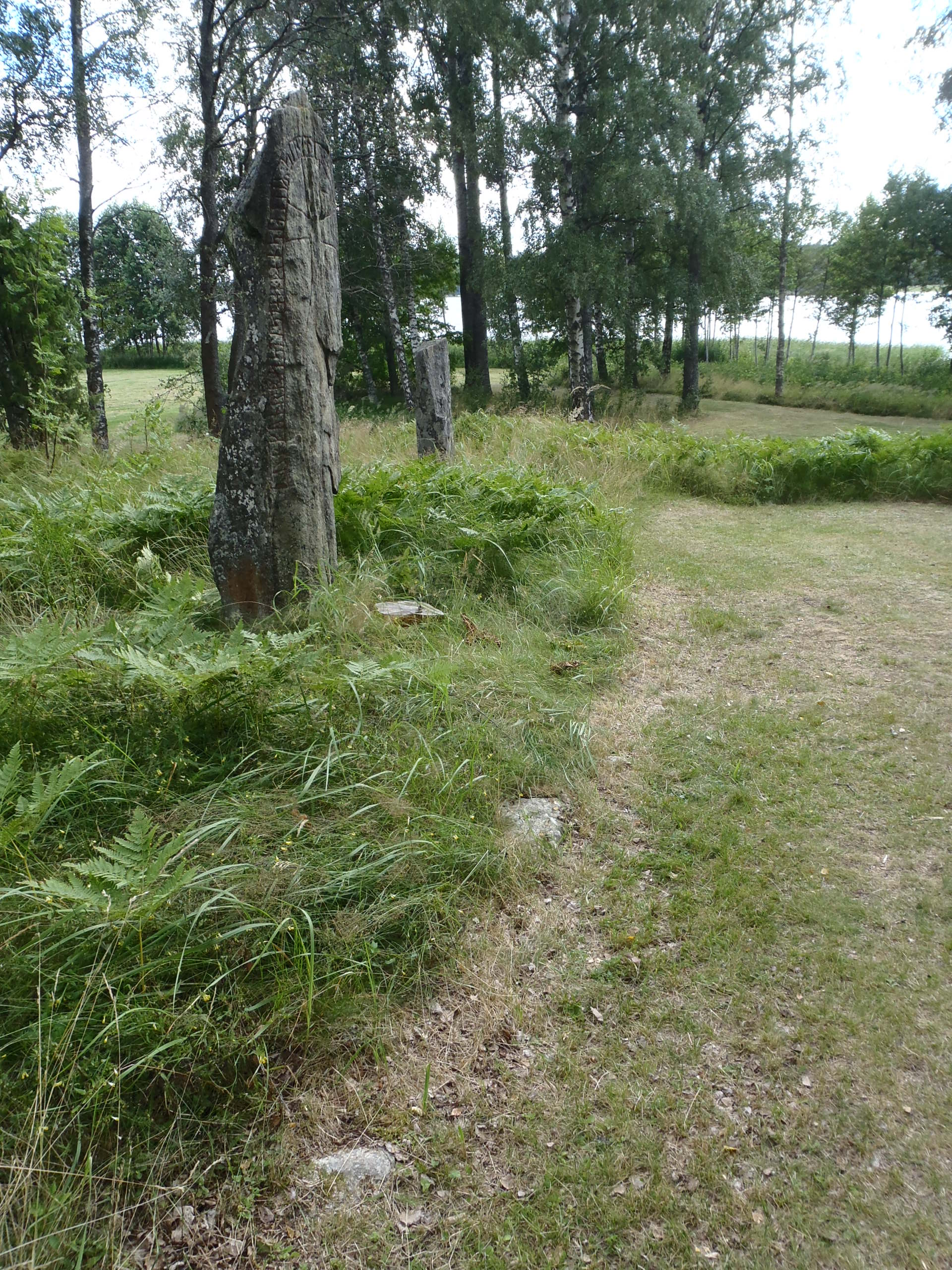
- Woods around Tisnaren Lake are home to runes and ancient monuments

- Location within Södermanland
- Coordinates: 58°57′N 15°57′E
- Basin countries: Sweden

Tisnaren (Swedish pronunciation: [ˈtîːsnarɛn, ˈtîːsnaɳ]) is a lake of Södermanland, Sweden.
