= Askersund Municipality =

Askersund Municipality Askersunds kommun
- Municipality
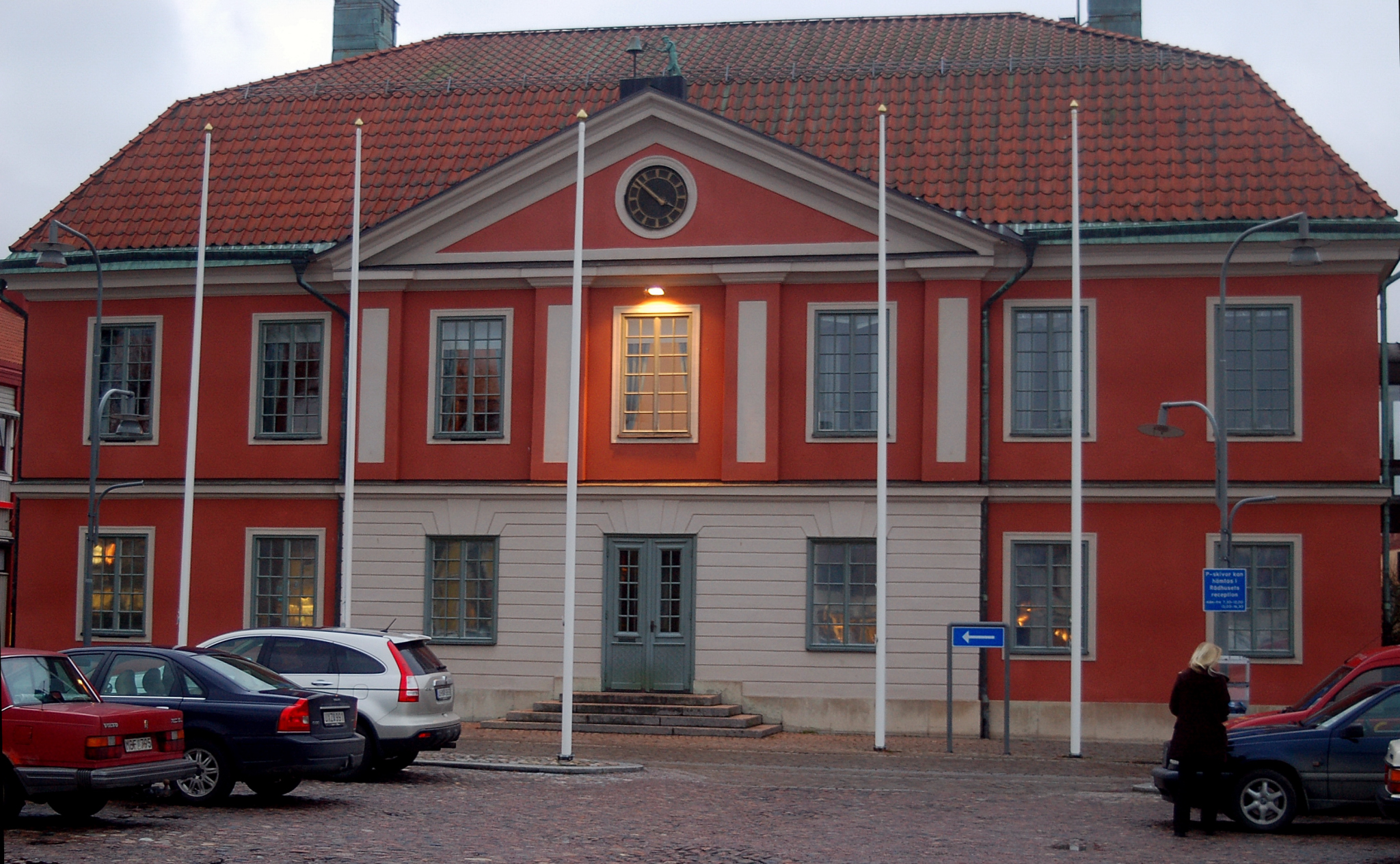
- Askersund Town Hall

- Coat of arms

- Coordinates: 58°53′N 14°54′E
- Country: Sweden
- County: Örebro County
- Seat: Askersund

Area
  - Total: 1,019.74 km^{2} (393.72 sq mi)
  - Land: 815.99 km^{2} (315.06 sq mi)
  - Water: 203.75 km^{2} (78.67 sq mi)
- Area as of 1 January 2014.

Population (30 June 2025)
  - Total: 11,446
  - Density: 14.027/km^{2} (36.330/sq mi)
- Time zone: UTC+1 (CET)
  - Summer (DST): UTC+2 (CEST)
- ISO 3166 code: SE
- Province: Närke
- Municipal code: 1882
- Website: www.askersund.se

Askersund Municipality (Swedish: Askersunds kommun) is a municipality in Örebro County in central Sweden. Its seat is located in the city of Askersund.

The present municipality was created in 1971, when the former City of Askersund was merged with the rural municipalities Hammar and Lerbäck.

== Localities ==
- Askersund (seat)
- Zinkgruvan
- Lerbäck
- Mariedamm
- Åmmeberg
- Åsbro

== Twin towns ==
Askersund's two twin towns with the year of its establishing:

1. (1945) Eura, Finland
2. (1990) Jordanów, Poland

== Demographics ==
This is a demographic table based on Askersund Municipality's electoral districts in the 2022 Swedish general election sourced from SVT's election platform, in turn taken from SCB official statistics.

In total there were 11,518 residents, including 9,144 Swedish citizens of voting age. 44.8% voted for the left coalition and 53.7% for the right coalition. Indicators are in percentage points except population totals and income.

Location	Residents	Citizen adults	Left vote	Right vote	Employed	Swedish parents	Foreign heritage	Income SEK	Degree
Location			%	%					
Hammar-Olshammar	1,496	1,244	38.0	61.2	83	90	10	25,265	22
Klockarbacken	1,198	933	42.2	55.6	83	88	12	23,035	30
Mariedamm-Lerbäck	1,303	1,006	43.2	55.0	84	91	9	24,647	26
Närlunda	1,965	1,521	48.1	50.2	82	86	14	24,026	24
Sjöängen	1,954	1,620	50.9	47.4	80	85	15	22,259	29
Snavlunda	692	557	51.5	47.5	88	95	5	27,052	32
Åmmeberg-Zinkgruvan	1,241	969	41.2	57.5	83	92	8	28,148	21
Åsbro	1,669	1,294	43.4	55.2	81	90	10	25,061	25
Source: SVT

== Elections ==
These are the results of the elections in the municipality since the first election after the municipal reform, being held in 1973. The exact results of Sweden Democrats were not listed at a municipal level by SCB from 1988 to 1998 due to the party's small size at the time. "Turnout" denotes the percentage of eligible people casting any ballots, whereas "Votes" denotes the number of valid votes only.

=== Riksdag elections ===
Year	Turnout	Votes	V	S	MP	C	L	KD	M	SD	NyD	Left	Right
1973	90.1	7,452	2.4	47.7		29.9	7.4	4.0	8.5			50.1	45.8
1976	91.2	7,787	2.2	46.5		31.2	7.3	2.7	10.1			48.7	48.6
1979	90.2	7,820	2.9	47.1		24.1	7.7	2.9	14.5			50.0	46.3
1982	90.9	8,058	2.9	50.8	1.2	21.0	5.0	3.3	15.9			53.7	41.9
1985	89.6	7,936	3.0	50.6	0.9	19.9	10.8		14.6			53.6	45.3
1988	86.9	7,651	4.0	49.8	3.5	16.5	9.2	4.8	12.2			57.5	37.9
1991	86.8	7,769	3.2	43.8	2.3	13.1	6.2	9.5	14.8		6.6	47.0	43.6
1994	87.3	7,957	5.6	52.4	3.9	11.0	5.5	5.4	14.9		0.8	61.9	36.8
1998	81.8	7,273	12.8	42.5	3.6	8.5	3.5	11.5	15.8			58.9	39.3
2002	81.0	7,186	8.5	45.4	3.2	10.5	8.7	9.3	11.1	2.1		57.1	39.6
2006	82.7	7,371	5.4	43.9	3.5	10.9	5.2	7.5	18.6	3.7		52.7	42.2
2010	84.8	7,628	4.6	39.4	4.9	8.1	4.9	6.0	25.6	5.8		48.9	44.6
2014	86.7	7,664	4.4	37.9	4.1	8.5	3.1	4.4	17.4	17.7		46.4	33.4
2018	88.6	7,818	5.5	32.2	2.3	9.2	3.0	6.8	16.5	23.3		49.1	49.5
