= Långhalsen =

Lake in Katrineholm Municipality, Sweden

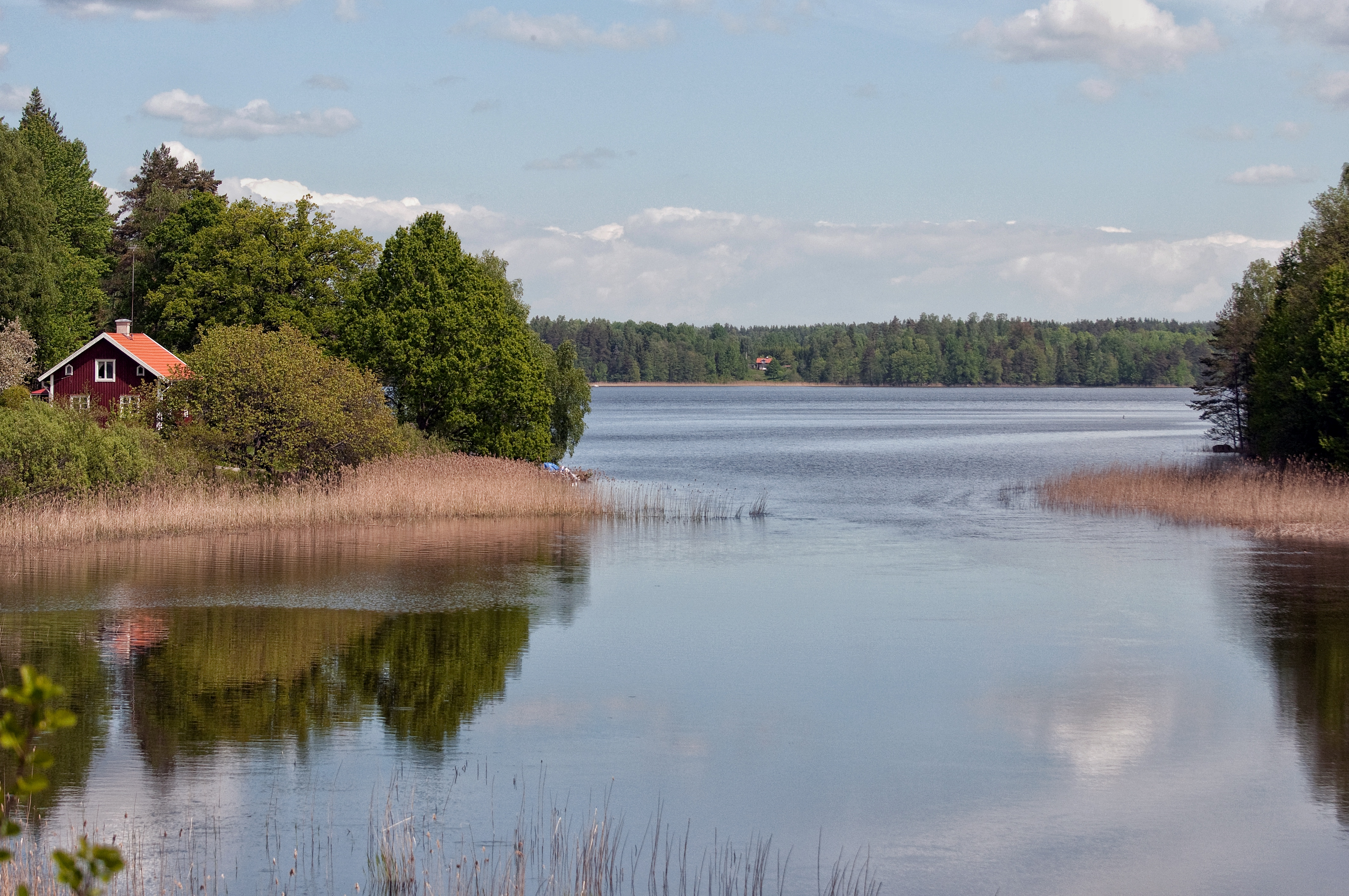

- Location within Södermanland Location within Sweden
- Coordinates: 58°53′N 16°45′E
- Basin countries: Sweden

Långhalsen is a lake predominantly in Nyköping Municipality, Södermanland, Sweden that is part of the Nyköpingsån drainage area. There is a very small portion of the lake's northern inlet that is part of Flen Municipality. There are three nearby lakes directly connected to its north that also are named Långhalsen due to their similar shapes, although they are considered separate lakes due to being connected by narrow rivers and straits. The lake surface is located at 19 metres (62 ft) above sea level with multiple inlets and has several islands, the highest of which rises to 53 metres (174 ft).
