= Björkvik =

- Location within Södermanland Location within Sweden
- Coordinates: 58°50′N 16°31′E
- Country: Sweden
- Province: Södermanland
- County: Södermanland County
- Municipality: Katrineholm Municipality

Area
  - Total: 0.96 km^{2} (0.37 sq mi)

Population (31 December 2020)
  - Total: 518
  - Density: 540/km^{2} (1,400/sq mi)
- Time zone: UTC+1 (CET)
  - Summer (DST): UTC+2 (CEST)
- Climate: Dfb

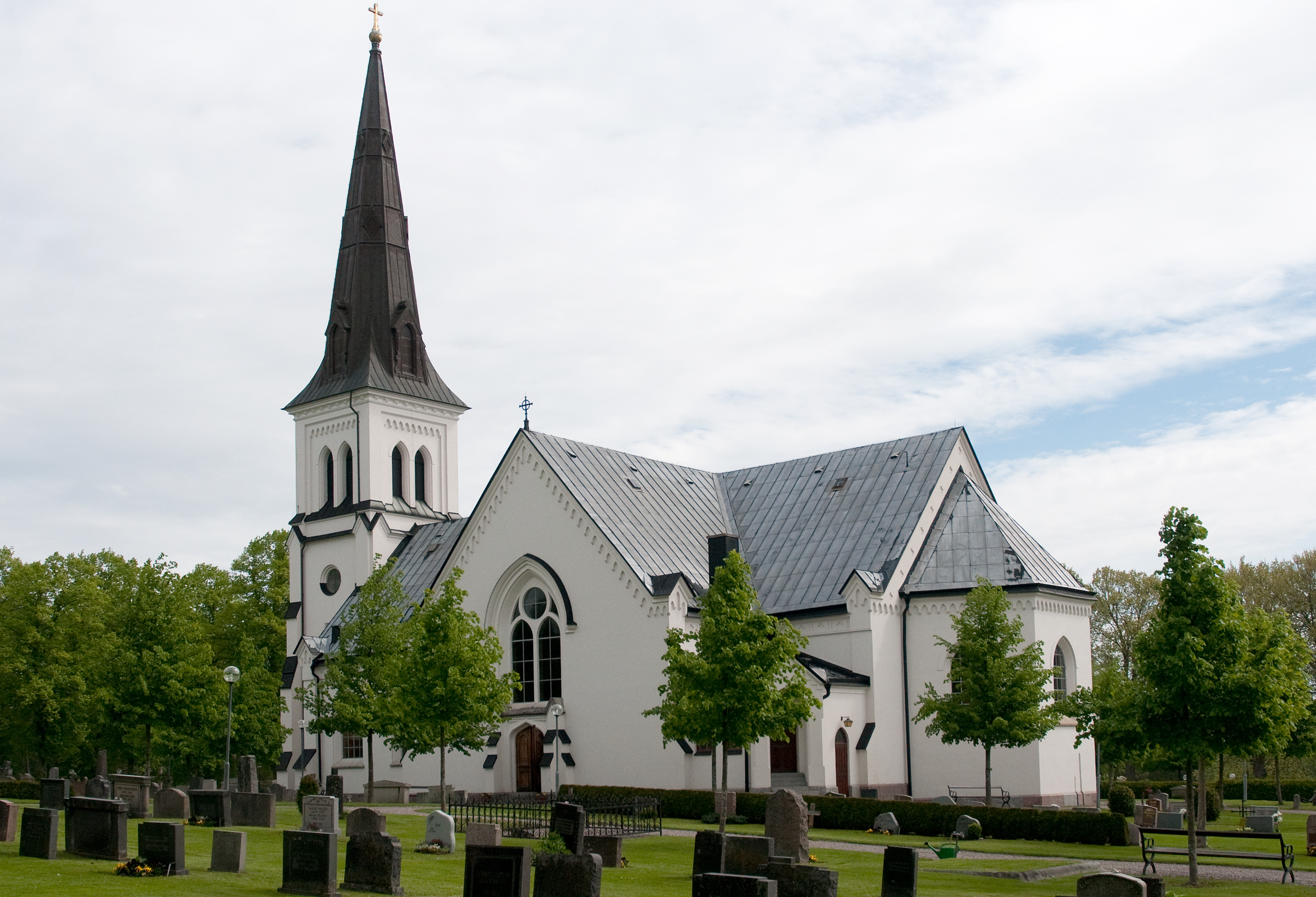

Björkvik is a locality situated in Katrineholm Municipality, Södermanland County, Sweden with 492 inhabitants in 2010. It is primarily a farming community interspersed by forests and lakes, with some larger estates dating back to the 17th century.

== Notable people from Björkvik ==
- Ernfrid Bogstedt, Swedish artist
