= Hallbosjön =

Lake in Nyköping Municipality, Sweden

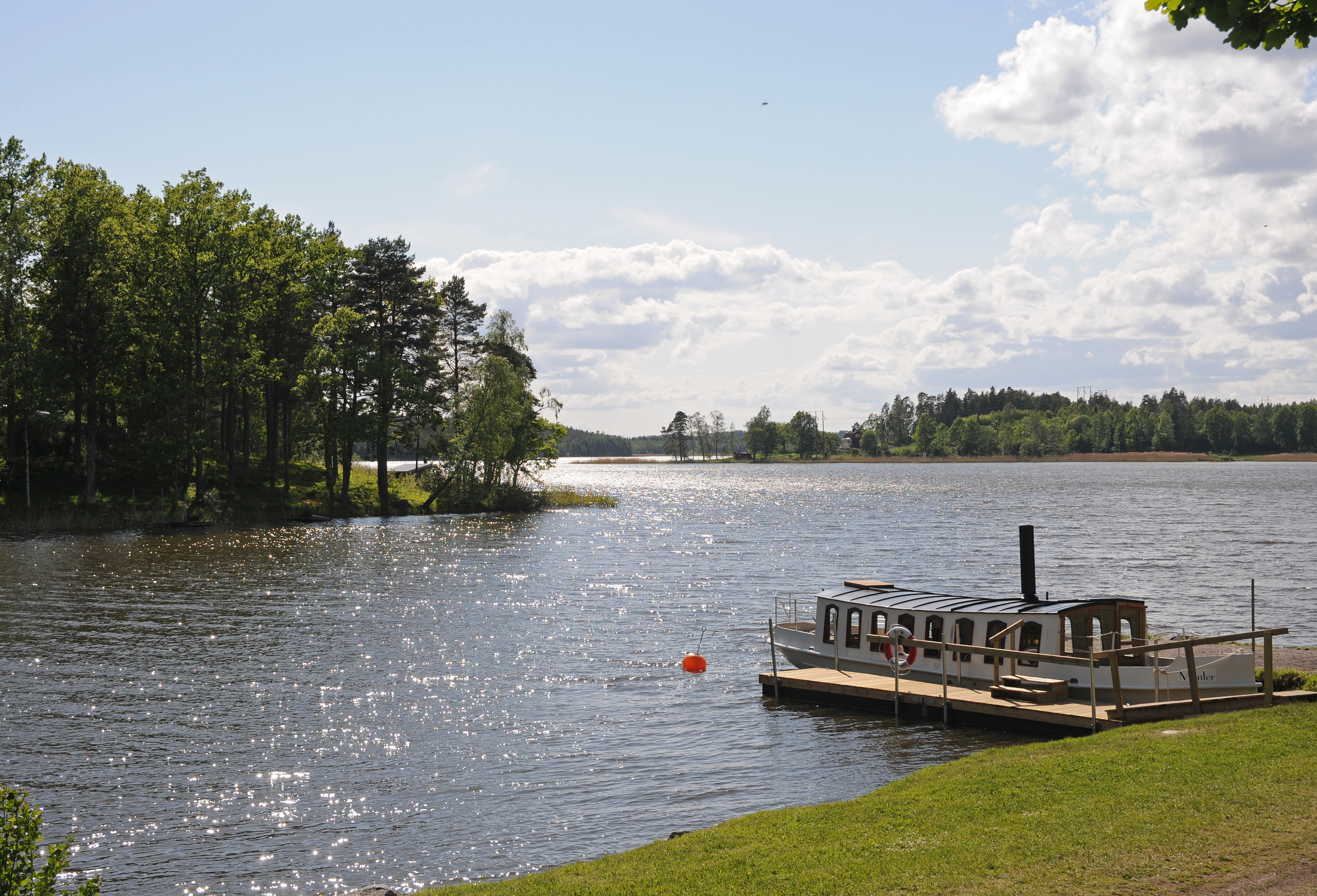

- Location within Södermanland
- Coordinates: 58°50′N 16°41′E
- Basin countries: Sweden

Hallbosjön is a lake in Södermanland County, Sweden.
