= Flen =

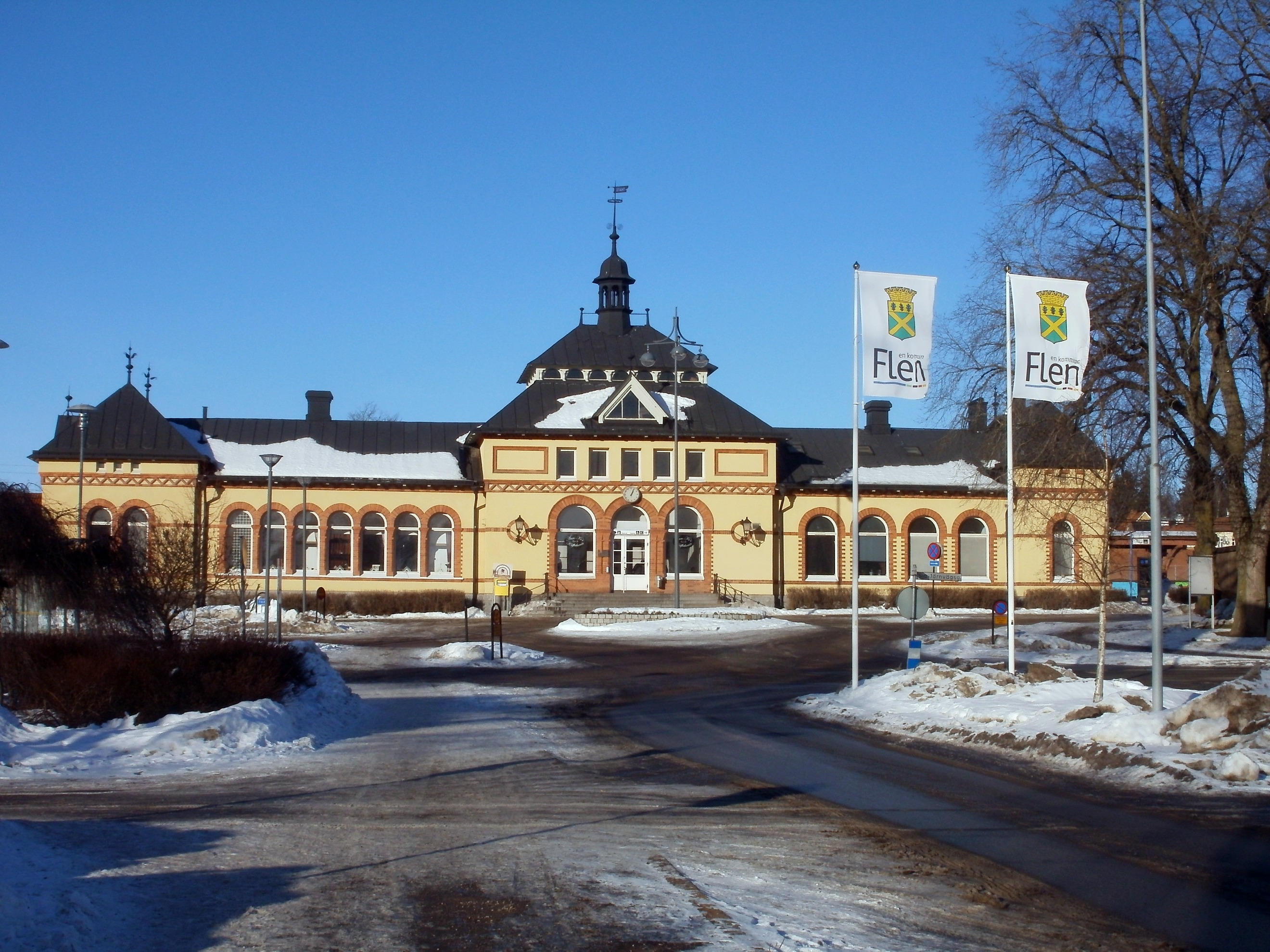
- Flen railway station

- Coat of arms

- Location within Södermanland Location within Sweden
- Coordinates: 59°03′N 16°35′E
- Country: Sweden
- Province: Södermanland
- County: Södermanland County
- Municipality: Flen Municipality

Area
  - Total: 4.45 km^{2} (1.72 sq mi)

Population (31 December 2020)
  - Total: 6,577
  - Density: 1,480/km^{2} (3,830/sq mi)
- Time zone: UTC+1 (CET)
  - Summer (DST): UTC+2 (CEST)

Flen (Swedish pronunciation: [fleːn]) is a locality and the seat of Flen Municipality, Södermanland County, Sweden with 6,229 inhabitants in 2010.

Flen evolved as a railway junction and got the title of a city in 1949. Since 1971 it is the seat of the much larger Flen Municipality.

Other things which made Flen famous is "Violen från Flen", a song written by Ulf Peder Olrog in the 1940s. The town also plays an important role in "Du ringde från Flen", a 1992 dansband song by Grönwalls. The town is also mentioned in the Kent song "Flen/Paris" on the 2005 EP The hjärta & smärta EP and "Ensam lång väg hem" on the 2010 album En plats i solen. The famous Equestrians Carl Green and Sigurd Svensson was born here.

Flen is known as the 'city of ice cream' because it is the location of GB Glace, the biggest ice cream company in Sweden.

Flen is also famous for having the world's northernmost vineyard, in Blacksta.

== Riksdag elections ==
This list charts the urban area of Flen itself rather than the namesake municipality of which Flen is the seat.

Year	%	Votes	V	S	MP	C	L	KD	M	SD	NyD	Left	Right
1973	92.0	4,383	3.2	54.3		21.1	8.8	2.1	10.4			57.5	40.2
1976	91.8	4,575	3.0	53.4		21.0	8.7	2.2	11.6			56.3	41.3
1979	90.5	4,708	3.7	53.6		16.2	9.7	1.9	14.4			57.3	40.3
1982	91.8	4,708	4.2	57.6	1.1	12.6	4.4	2.4	17.1			61.8	34.1
1985	89.5	4,556	4.5	57.5	1.2	10.7	10.9		14.8			62.0	33.5
1988	85.4	4,270	5.5	55.7	4.3	9.2	10.0	2.5	12.4			65.5	31.5
1991	84.4	4,117	4.4	51.7	2.3	8.1	7.7	6.5	14.7		4.2	56.1	37.0
1994	86.3	4,197	6.3	59.1	3.8	5.1	5.3	3.6	15.2		0.7	69.1	29.1
1998	79.9	3,910	13.4	48.7	3.5	3.6	2.6	10.7	15.8			65.6	32.7
2002	77.6	3,781	7.9	54.5	3.8	3.8	9.6	7.5	10.5	0.8		66.1	31.5
2006	79.0	3,843	5.8	54.6	3.1	4.5	4.9	5.4	17.4	2.5		63.6	32.3
2010	79.2	3,824	6.2	46.2	5.1	3.7	5.2	5.0	21.6	6.3		57.5	35.6
2014	82.2	3,939	5.7	42.1	4.8	3.5	3.1	3.7	16.3	18.6		52.6	26.7
2018	80.5	3,877	7.6	40.7	3.1	5.1	2.6	5.2	15.0	19.8		56.4	42.6
