= Flen Municipality =

Flen Municipality Flens kommun
- Municipality
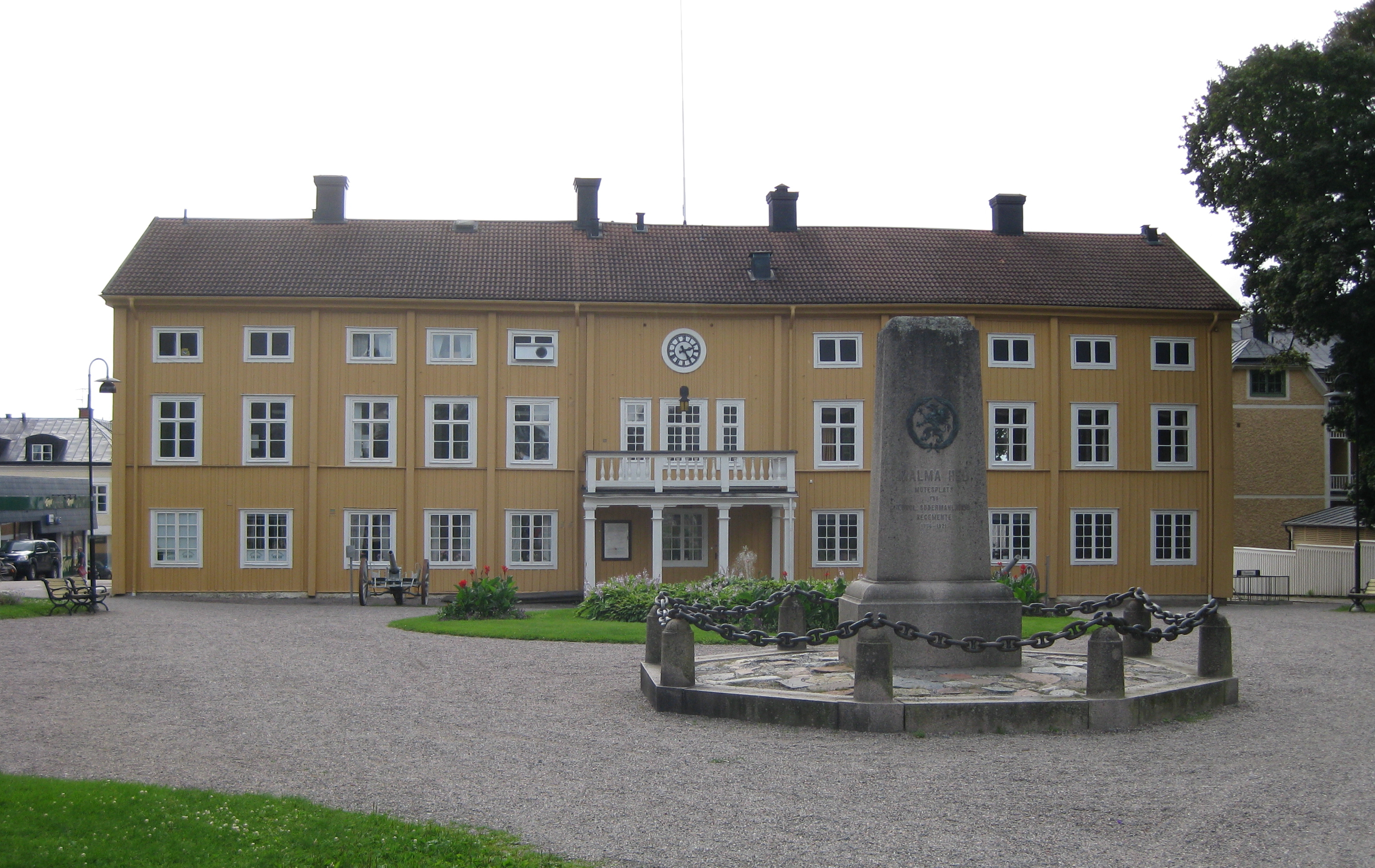

- Flag Coat of arms

- Coordinates: 59°03′N 16°35′E
- Country: Sweden
- County: Södermanland County
- Seat: Flen

Area
  - Total: 826.04 km^{2} (318.94 sq mi)
  - Land: 718.83 km^{2} (277.54 sq mi)
  - Water: 107.21 km^{2} (41.39 sq mi)
- Area as of 1 January 2014.

Population (30 June 2025)
  - Total: 15,295
  - Density: 21.278/km^{2} (55.109/sq mi)
- Time zone: UTC+1 (CET)
  - Summer (DST): UTC+2 (CEST)
- ISO 3166 code: SE
- Province: Södermanland
- Municipal code: 0482
- Website: www.flen.se

Flen Municipality (Swedish: Flens kommun) is a municipality in central Södermanland County in southeast Sweden. Its seat is located in the city of Flen.

The present municipality was formed in 1971 through the amalgamation of the City of Flen (instituted in 1949), the market town (köping) Malmköping and the surrounding countryside, including a southeastern portion of the former Oppunda hundred that was split between Flen and Nyköping municipalities. It also includes all of the former Villåttinge hundred.

== Geography ==
Flen Municipality is a lowland inland municipality that falls to 19 metres (62 ft) above sea level on the lakes of Långhalsen and Torpfjärden in the southeastern area. The highest peak is at 103 metres (338 ft) on the tripoint between Flen, Gnesta and Strängnäs municipalities.

== Localities ==
Figures from Statistics Sweden, 2004.

- Flen 6,107
- Malmköping 2,006
- Hälleforsnäs 1,737
- Sparreholm 799
- Skebokvarn 225
- Mellösa 549
- Bettna 410
- Vadsbro 118

Of these places, Malmköping, located about 15 km north of Flen, surpasses Flen as a tourism attraction due to its two annual markets. The traditions of markets in Malmköping goes back centuries, as Malmköping got market town rights (became a köping) already in 1785.

== Elections ==
The following results are since the 1972 municipal reform onwards.

=== Riksdag ===
Year	Turnout	Votes	V	S	MP	C	L	KD	M	SD	NyD	Left	Right
1973	93.5	11,513	3.2	49.4		26.8	8.0	1.8	10.6			52.6	45.4
1976	93.1	11,658	2.8	49.2		26.9	8.1	1.6	11.3			52.0	46.3
1979	92.3	11,747	3.5	49.5		21.9	8.5	1.5	14.6			53.0	45.0
1982	93.2	11,762	4.0	52.1	1.6	18.5	4.4	1.6	17.5			56.1	40.4
1985	91.2	11,499	4.2	51.9	1.8	15.3	10.6		15.4			56.1	41.3
1988	87.3	10,821	5.0	50.2	5.2	14.3	9.3	2.3	13.2			60.4	36.8
1991	87.0	10,765	4.1	45.4	3.1	11.8	7.0	6.4	15.6		6.1	49.5	40.8
1994	87.7	10,924	6.1	52.1	5.0	9.2	5.1	3.6	17.1		0.7	63.2	35.0
1998	81.4	9,924	12.1	43.3	4.9	6.8	2.7	11.2	17.6			60.3	38.3
2002	80.3	9,724	7.5	48.1	4.5	7.5	9.2	8.6	12.1	1.0		60.1	37.4
2006	81.9	9,911	5.4	46.5	4.3	8.7	4.9	5.6	20.2	2.7		56.2	39.4
2010	84.7	10,271	5.5	38.7	5.9	8.2	4.8	4.9	24.2	6.9		50.1	42.3
2014	85.4	10,136	5.5	36.2	4.9	7.5	3.4	3.5	18.6	17.8		46.6	33.0
2018	86.0	10,118	6.2	33.0	3.5	8.3	3.2	5.6	16.9	21.2		51.7	46.9

== Demographics ==
This is a demographic table based on Flen Municipality's electoral districts in the 2022 Swedish general election sourced from SVT's election platform, in turn taken from SCB official statistics.

Flen is a poor municipality by lower Svealand standards. As of 2022 it was a rather segregated municipality with very high levels of ethnic minority populations concentrated south of the railway, while people of Swedish background are in a sizeable majority in the outer parts of town and in the countryside. Every district was beneath the median income of its southern neighbour Nyköping. In total there were 16,271 inhabitants with 11,959 Swedish citizen adults eligible to vote. The political demographics were 50.4 % for the left bloc and 48.4 % for the right bloc, with the left dominating the town and the right sizeably winning the villages and countryside. No district reached 35% college graduates and unemployment was high throughout much of the municipality. Indicators are in percentage points except population totals and income.

Location	Residents	Citizen adults	Left vote	Right vote	Employed	Swedish parents	Foreign heritage	Income SEK	Degree
Location			%	%					
Bettna	1,502	1,199	42.2	56.5	82	88	12	24,876	30
Flens C	1,359	877	64.8	34.2	63	52	48	18,802	25
Flens N	1,479	1,197	51.0	48.0	80	79	21	24,872	30
Flens S	1,554	893	68.5	27.5	50	26	74	14,764	19
Flens V	1,218	965	57.1	42.3	71	63	37	20,676	26
Flens Ö	1,284	963	47.3	50.4	74	66	34	23,164	31
Helgesta-Hyltinge	1,558	1,289	46.3	52.6	82	85	15	23,559	34
Hälleforsnäs	1,684	1,160	53.2	45.9	63	64	36	19,390	23
Malmköping V	1,546	1,104	42.4	56.6	68	73	27	20,273	23
Malmköping Ö	1,796	1,303	47.0	51.2	77	84	16	22,908	30
Mellösa	1,291	1,009	47.5	51.6	83	89	11	25,069	34
Source: SVT

== Sister City ==
- Vareš, Bosnia and Herzegovina
