= 1988 Swedish general election =

1988 election for the Swedish parliament

- 18 September 1988

All 349 seats in the Riksdag 175 seats needed for a majority
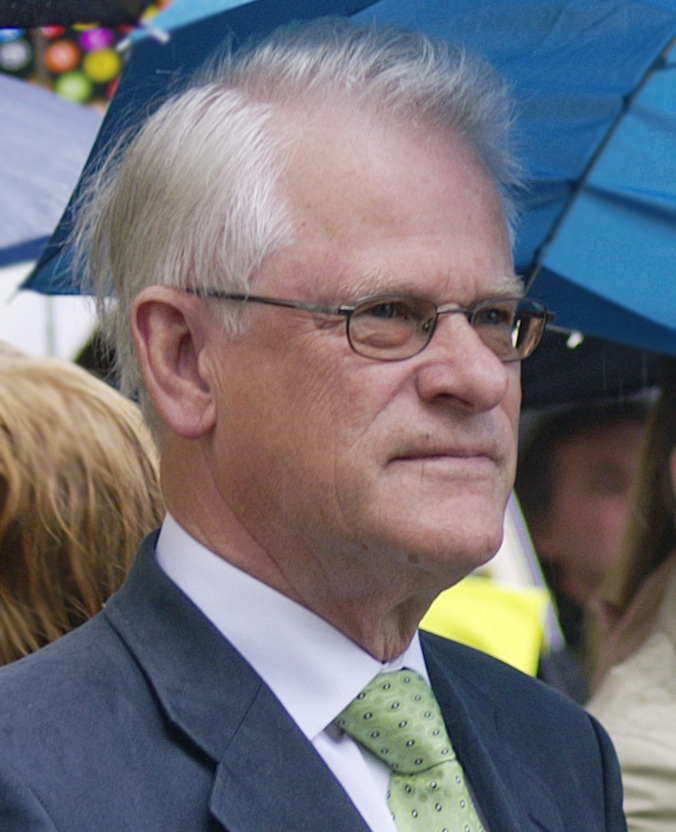

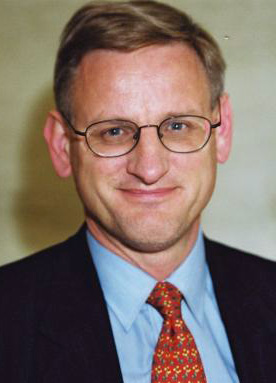

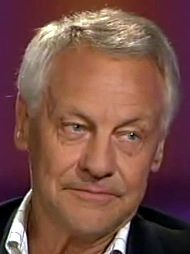

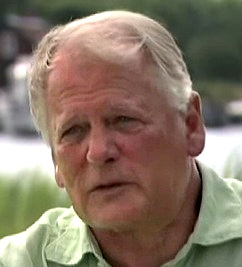

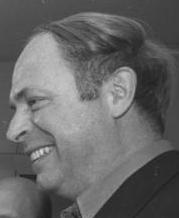

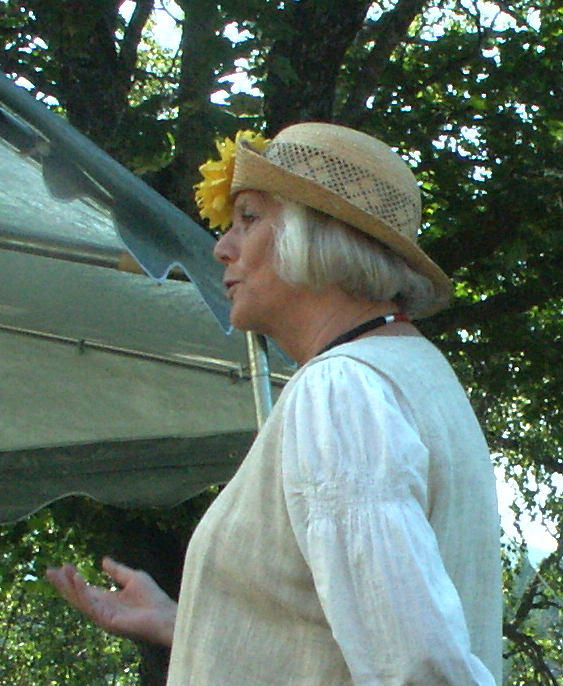

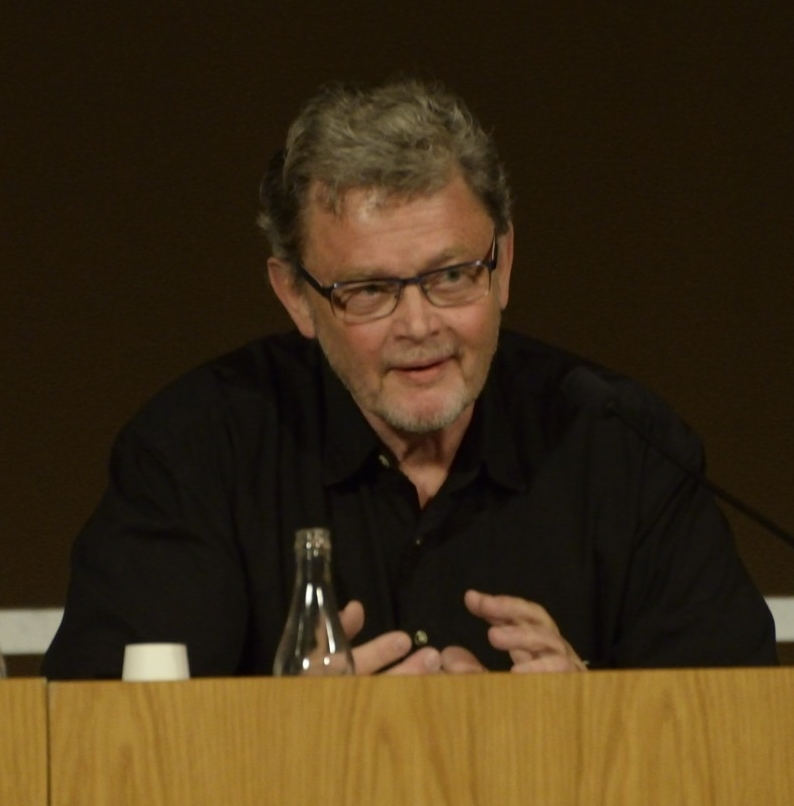
	First party	Second party	Third party
Leader	Ingvar Carlsson	Carl Bildt	Bengt Westerberg
Party	Social Democrats	Moderate	People's
Last election	159	76	51
Seats won	156	66	44
Seat change	▼3	▼10	▼7
Popular vote	2,321,826	983,226	655,720
Percentage	43.21%	18.30%	12.20%
Swing	▼1.67 pp	▼3.33 pp	▼2.23 pp
	Fourth party	Fifth party	Sixth party
Leader	Olof Johansson	Lars Werner	Eva Goës; Birger Schlaug
Party	Centre	Left Communists	Green
Last election	43	19	0
Seats won	42	21	20
Seat change	▼1	▲2	▲20
Popular vote	607,240	314,031	296,935
Percentage	11.30%	5.84%	5.53%
Swing	▲2.48 pp	▲0.48 pp	▲4.03 pp
- Map of the election, showing the distribution of constituency and levelling seats, as well as the largest political bloc within each constituency.
PM before election
Ingvar Carlsson
Social Democrats
Elected PM
Ingvar Carlsson
Social Democrats

General elections were held in Sweden on 18 September 1988. The Swedish Social Democratic Party remained the largest party in the Riksdag, winning 156 of the 349 seats.

The Swedish Green Party won seats in the Riksdag for the first time.

The Sweden Democrats (SD) ran for the first time and received 1,118 votes.

== Debates ==
1988 Swedish general election debates
Date	Time (CEST)	Organizers	Moderators	P Present I Invitee N Non-invitee					
Date	Time (CEST)	Organizers	Moderators	S	M	L	C	V	Refs
16 Sep	21:30	Sveriges Television	Gösta Spjuth; Maud Zachrisson	P Ingvar Carlsson, Kjell-Olof Feldt	P Carl Bildt	P Bengt Westerberg	P Olof Johansson	P Lars Werner	

== Results ==
Party	Votes	%	Seats	+/–
Swedish Social Democratic Party	2,321,826	43.21	156	–3
Moderate Party	983,226	18.30	66	–10
People's Party	655,720	12.20	44	–7
Centre Party	607,240	11.30	42	–1
Left Party Communists	314,031	5.84	21	+2
Green Party	296,935	5.53	20	+20
Christian Democratic Society Party	158,182	2.94	0	–1
Other parties	36,559	0.68	0	0
Total	5,373,719	100.00	349	0
Valid votes	5,373,719	98.76		
Invalid/blank votes	67,331	1.24		
Total votes	5,441,050	100.00		
Registered voters/turnout	6,330,023	85.96		
Source: Nohlen & Stöver

=== Seat distribution ===
Constituency	Total seats	Seats won								
Constituency	Total seats	By party						By coalition		
Constituency	Total seats	S	M	F	C	V	MP	Left	Right	Others
Älvsborg North	11	4	2	2	2		1	4	6	1
Älvsborg South	6	3	1	1	1			3	3	
Blekinge	6	4	1		1			4	2	
Bohus	12	5	2	2	1	1	1	6	5	1
Fyrstadskretsen	20	9	5	2	1	1	2	10	8	2
Gävleborg	12	6	1	1	2	1	1	7	4	1
Gothenburg	19	7	4	3	1	2	2	9	8	2
Gotland	2	1			1			1	1	
Halland	11	4	2	2	2		1	4	6	1
Jämtland	5	3	1		1			3	2	
Jönköping	11	5	2	2	2			5	6	
Kalmar	10	5	2	1	2			5	5	
Kopparberg	12	6	1	1	2	1	1	7	4	1
Kristianstad	12	5	3	1	2		1	5	6	1
Kronoberg	6	3	1	1	1			3	3	
Malmöhus	13	6	3	1	2		1	6	6	1
Norrbotten	10	6	1	1	1	1		7	3	
Örebro	11	6	1	2	1	1		7	4	
Östergötland	17	8	3	2	2	1	1	9	7	1
Skaraborg	11	5	2	1	2		1	5	5	1
Södermanland	9	5	2	1	1			5	4	
Stockholm County	37	13	10	6	2	3	3	16	18	3
Stockholm Municipality	30	10	8	5	1	4	2	14	14	2
Uppsala	12	5	2	2	1	1	1	6	5	1
Värmland	12	6	2	1	2	1		7	5	
Västerbotten	10	5	1	1	2	1		6	4	
Västernorrland	12	6	1	1	2	1	1	7	4	1
Västmanland	10	5	2	1	1	1		6	4	
Total	349	156	66	44	42	21	20	177	152	20
Source: Statistics Sweden

=== By municipality ===
Votes by municipality. The municipalities are the color of the party that got the most votes within the coalition that won relative majority.

Cartogram of the map to the left with each municipality rescaled to the number of valid votes cast.

Map showing the voting shifts from the 1985 to the 1988 election. Darker blue indicates a municipality voted more towards the parties that formed the centre-right bloc. Darker red indicates a municipality voted more towards the parties that form the left-wing bloc.

Votes by municipality as a scale from red/Left-wing bloc to blue/Centre-right bloc.

Cartogram of vote with each municipality rescaled in proportion to number of valid votes cast. Deeper blue represents a relative majority for the centre-right coalition, brighter red represents a relative majority for the left-wing coalition.
