= Chip =

Chip may refer to:

== Food ==
- Chip (snack), thinly sliced and deep-fried gastro item
  - Potato chips (US) or crisp (UK)
- Chips (fried potato strips) (UK) or french fries (US) (common as a takeout side)
- Game chips, thin chip/French fries
- Chocolate chip

== Sports and gaming ==
- Chip (association football), a type of football shot
- Chip (golf), a type of golf shot
- Casino token, often referred to as a chip
- Chip, one of the mascots of the University of Colorado at Boulder
- Chip, the mascot of Rhode Island FC

== People and fictional characters ==
- Chip (name), a list of people and fictional characters with either the given name or nickname
- Chip (rapper), English hip hop recording artist born Jahmaal Noel Fyffe in 1990
- King Chip (born 1986), stage name of American hip hop rapper Charles Jawanzaa Worth, formerly known as Chip tha Ripper
- Chip Douglas, American songwriter, musician, and record producer Douglas Hatlelid (born 1942)
- Chip Taylor, stage name of American songwriter James Wesley Voight (born 1940)
- Chip Fairway, a ring name of American professional wrestler Brett J. Keen (1972–2011)

== Biology ==
- Chromatin immunoprecipitation (ChIP), a molecular biology method to map DNA sites
- STUB1, a human gene also known as CHIP (C terminus of HSC70-Interacting Protein)
- Clonal hematopoiesis of indeterminate potential (CHIP)

== Computing ==
- Chip, a monolithic integrated circuit without its packaging, a microchip
  - An integrated circuit mounted on a surface mount chip carrier
- Chip (CDMA), the fundamental unit of transmission in code-division multiple access (CDMA)
- Chip (GUI), a graphical user interface element for input grouping and tagging
- CHIP (computer), Linux dev board built by Next Thing Co. and marketed as a miniature computer
- CHIP (programming language), based on Prolog
- CHIP-8, a video game programming language in the 1970s
- ChucK for iPhone/iPad (ChiP), a programming language used for music synthesis
- Connected Home over IP (CHIP), a protocol for home automation

== Finance ==
- Chip (stock market), description of stock of a particular quality
- Clearing House Interbank Payments System (CHIPS), a United States private clearing house for large-value transactions

== Organizations and programs ==
- California Highway Patrol (CHiP), a law enforcement agency of California
  - "CHiPs" (TV series), (1977-1983) based on the enforcement agency
  - "CHiPs" (2017 film), based on the TV series, directed by Dax Shepard
- CHIP Holding, a German-based publishing house
- Children's Health Insurance Program (CHIP), a US federal government program
- Community Housing and Infrastructure Program (CHIP), an Australian government funding program, along with its Community Development Employment Projects
- Masonic Child Identification Programs, a charitable initiative by North American Masonic lodges

== Other uses ==
- Chip language, spoken in Nigeria
- Swarf, also known as chips, the debris or waste resulting from metalworking operations
- CHIP (magazine), a German computer magazine
  - Chip-India, Indian edition of German computer magazine CHIP

== See also ==
- "Chip Chip", a 1961 song written by Jeff Barry, Clifford Crawford, and Arthur Resnick and performed by Gene McDaniels
- Chips (disambiguation)
- Chipper (disambiguation)
- Chipping (disambiguation)
- Ch!pz, a Dutch band
