= Chipper =

Chipper may refer to:

== People ==
- Chipper (nickname)
- Chipper (surname)

== Arts, entertainment, and media ==
- Chipper the chipmunk, a Beanie Baby
- Chipper, a children's book by James Lincoln Collier

== Other uses ==
- Chipper (dog), a dog in the RCA family
- Chipper (drugs), an occasional tobacco smoker or drug user
- Tree chipper or wood chipper, a machine used for reducing wood into smaller parts
- USS Chipper, the name of more than one United States Navy ship
- Chipper (golf), a type of golf club
- A fish and chip shop in Hiberno-English
- A nickname for Chocolate-covered potato chips
- Chipper, a chip card that competed with the Chipknip

== See also ==
- Chip (disambiguation)
- Chipping (disambiguation)
- Crisp (disambiguation)
