= Chipping =

Chipping may refer to:

== Places ==
=== England ===
Chipping is a prefix used in a number of place names in England, probably derived from ceapen, an Old English word meaning 'market', although the meaning may alternatively derive from (or via) the medieval English word chepynge, meaning 'long market square'. It was sometimes historically spelled Chepying.

- Chipping, Hertfordshire
- Chipping, Lancashire
- Chipping Barnet, Greater London (formerly Hertfordshire)
- Chipping Campden, Gloucestershire
- Chipping Norton, Oxfordshire
- Chipping Ongar, Essex
- Chipping Sodbury, Gloucestershire
- Chipping Warden, Northamptonshire
- Chepping Wycombe, Buckinghamshire

=== Elsewhere ===
- Chipping Norton, New South Wales, a suburb of Sydney in Australia

== Other uses ==
- Chipping (rock climbing)
- Chipping, chip tuning a car's ECU system
- Chipping, installing a modchip into a game console
- Chipping, using a woodchipper
- Chipping, being a chipper (tobacco), or occasional drugs user
- Chipping, a method of propagating plant bulbs, linked to twin-scaling
- Chipping, the process of inserting a microchip implant (animal)
- Chipping potato, a potato variety well-suited to making potato chips
- Chip (golf), a type of golf shot
- Chipping, or chip coding, in telecommunications theory, a method for encoding signals with many diverse applications

== See also ==
- Chip (disambiguation)
- Chipper (disambiguation)
- Chippenham (disambiguation)
- Loose chippings
