= Chips =

Chips most commonly refers to:

- Chips or french fries, long chunks of potato that have been deep fried or baked
- Chip (snack), or crisps, a snack food in the form of thin crispy slices
  - Potato chips, thin crispy slices of deep-fried or baked potatoes

Chips may also refer to:

== People ==
- Chips (nickname), various people
- Chips Rafferty, stage name of Australian actor John William Pilbean Goffage (1909–1971)
- Chips Mackinolty (born 1954), Australian artist

== Arts, entertainment, and media ==
=== Music ===
- Chips (album), from the eponymous Swedish group
- Chips (Swedish band), a Swedish pop band
- The Chips, a short-lived New York City doo-wop vocal group
- Chips (Irish band), active 1969 to 1980s
- "Chips", a song by Azealia Banks off the mixtape Fantasea

=== Television ===
- CHiPs, a television series about the California Highway Patrol
- "CHiPs (Space Ghost Coast to Coast)", an episode of Space Ghost Coast to Coast

=== Other arts, entertainment, and media ===
- CHiPs (film), a 2017 film version of the series
- Chips (literary magazine), the award-winning literary and art magazine of Bethesda-Chevy Chase High School
- Illustrated Chips, a British comic published from 1890 to 1953
- Chips, a separate pull-out section of Whizzer and Chips, a British comic published from 1969 to 1990
- Chips, a character in the animated series Adventure Time episode "Chips & Ice Cream"
- Mr. Chips, an English schoolteacher in James Hilton's novella Goodbye, Mr. Chips and its film adaptations

== Businesses ==
- Chips (coffee shop), a historic coffee shop in Los Angeles, California
- Chips (company), based in Åland, Finland, producer of potato chips and other food products
- Chips and Technologies (often stylized as CHIPS on their products), one of the first fabless microprocessor companies
- Clearing House Interbank Payments System, an American payment settlement scheme

== Computing and technology ==
- Chips, monolithic integrated circuits without their packaging, the bare semiconductor dice
- Common Hybrid Interface Protocol System (CHIPS), defines a computer network's interface and protocol systems used in serial and wireless communications
- CHIPS (satellite), Cosmic Hot Interstellar Plasma Spectrometer Satellite, a satellite launched in 2003
- Cookies Having Independent Partitioned State (CHIPS), an experimental browser cookie standard

== Other uses ==
- Children's Health Insurance Program
- Chips (dog), an American wardog who served in World War II
- Chips, Manchester, an apartment building
- The Chips (train), a passenger train that operates over the Blue Mountains between Lithgow and Sydney
- CHIPS and Science Act, IC chip legislation in the United States enacted in 2022
- Woodchips

== See also ==
- Chip (disambiguation)
