= Chip shot =

Chip shot may refer to:

- Chip (golf), a golf shot also known as half-swing
- Chip (association football), an association football shot also known as a lob
- Chip shot (gridiron football), a short field goal attempt in gridiron football
- Chip (curling), a takeout shot striking a rock at an angle
- Chip shot (idiom), a phrase denoting that an attempted action has a low degree of difficulty

== See also ==
- Chip (disambiguation)
