= Nyköping =

Place in Södermanland, Sweden

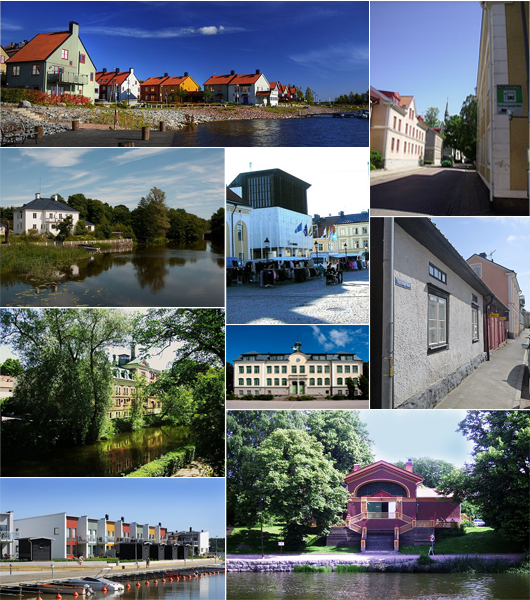
- Images of Nyköping

- Flag Coat of arms

- Location within Södermanland Location within Sweden
- Coordinates: 58°45′11″N 17°00′31″E
- Country: Sweden
- Province: Södermanland
- County: Södermanland County
- Municipality: Nyköping Municipality
- Founded: 1187

Area
  - City: 13.43 km^{2} (5.19 sq mi)
- Elevation: 20 m (66 ft)

Population (31 December 2020)
  - City: 38,780
  - Density: 2,225/km^{2} (5,760/sq mi)
  - Metro: 57,633
- Time zone: UTC+1 (CET)
  - Summer (DST): UTC+2 (CEST)
- Postal code: 611 xx
- Area code: (+46) 155
- Website: www.nykoping.se (in English)

Nyköping (Swedish pronunciation: [ˈnŷːˌɕøːpɪŋ]) is a locality and the seat of Nyköping Municipality, Södermanland County, Sweden, with 32,759 inhabitants as of 2017. The city is also the capital of Södermanland County.

Including Arnö, the locality on the southern shore of the bay just a couple of kilometres from the city centre, Nyköping would have above 36,000 inhabitants. Commonly, Arnö is referred to as a part of the city proper. It forms a wider conurbation with the neighbouring minor municipality and town of Oxelösund 10 kilometres (6.2 mi) south of its outskirts. The municipality is much larger, although sparsely populated outside of the urban area.

Nyköping directly translates to "New Chipping" in English. The prefix ny is translated as "new" and köping is an archaic Swedish word and cognate to the English chipping, commonly used as a suffix for cities in the south central region of the country. Nyköping is the name that appears on coins in 1230 and in historical records from the 13th century. Aros is the name of the town found in the archaeological records from before 1230, indicating a new era and a new name sometime around 1230. The city is located near the open Baltic Sea on the Stadsfjärden inlet, and is regarded as a coastal location. Rivers Nyköpingsån and Kilaån reach the Baltic Sea through the southern end of downtown. The former river splits the town down the middle into an eastern and western part. The river Svärtaån empties into the sea by the locality Sjösa, east of the town. There are multiple other inlets in the municipality, which has an extensive shoreline.

Typical of the region, the landscape is influenced by post-glacial rebound after the latest ice age. For thousands of years, the land of downtown Nyköping was an archipelago where the hills in town today formed many islands, while the flatter parts of the town were the seafloor. With four peaks above 50 metres (160 ft), the highest point within town limits is 59 metres (194 ft) at Ekensberg in the northeastern fringes.

Nyköping is also the home of Stockholm Skavsta Airport, which is located less than 10 kilometres (6.2 mi) from the city centre. Nyköping is part of the wider area of the Mälaren Valley, located around 100 kilometres (62 mi) south of inner Stockholm and 60 kilometres (37 mi) east of Norrköping, the nearest larger city. The municipal border between Nyköping and Norrköping marks the point where the historical lands Götaland and Svealand converge on the east coast.

It retains an oceanic/continental climate hybrid, causing warm summers and winters around the freezing point with variable snow cover.

== History ==
The area bears traces of settlers since around 2000 BC. In the early medieval age, around 1000 AD, Nyköping was a capital of one of the many Swedish petty kingdoms. In the 13th century, construction on the Nyköping Fortress begun; the following century it became the strongest fortress in the country. The coat of arms probably depicts the fortress, or one of its towers.

In 1317, the Nyköping Banquet took place, a renowned episode in Sweden's history, when King Birger of Sweden captured his two brothers as revenge for earlier sufferings and had them imprisoned without food until they starved to death (See Nyköpings gästabud).

The earliest known charter dates from 1444, making it one of the now defunct Cities in Sweden. In the 16th century, Nyköping became the seat of Duke Charles, who later became Charles IX of Sweden. With the status of a Royal residential seat, Nyköping was at its peak of development.

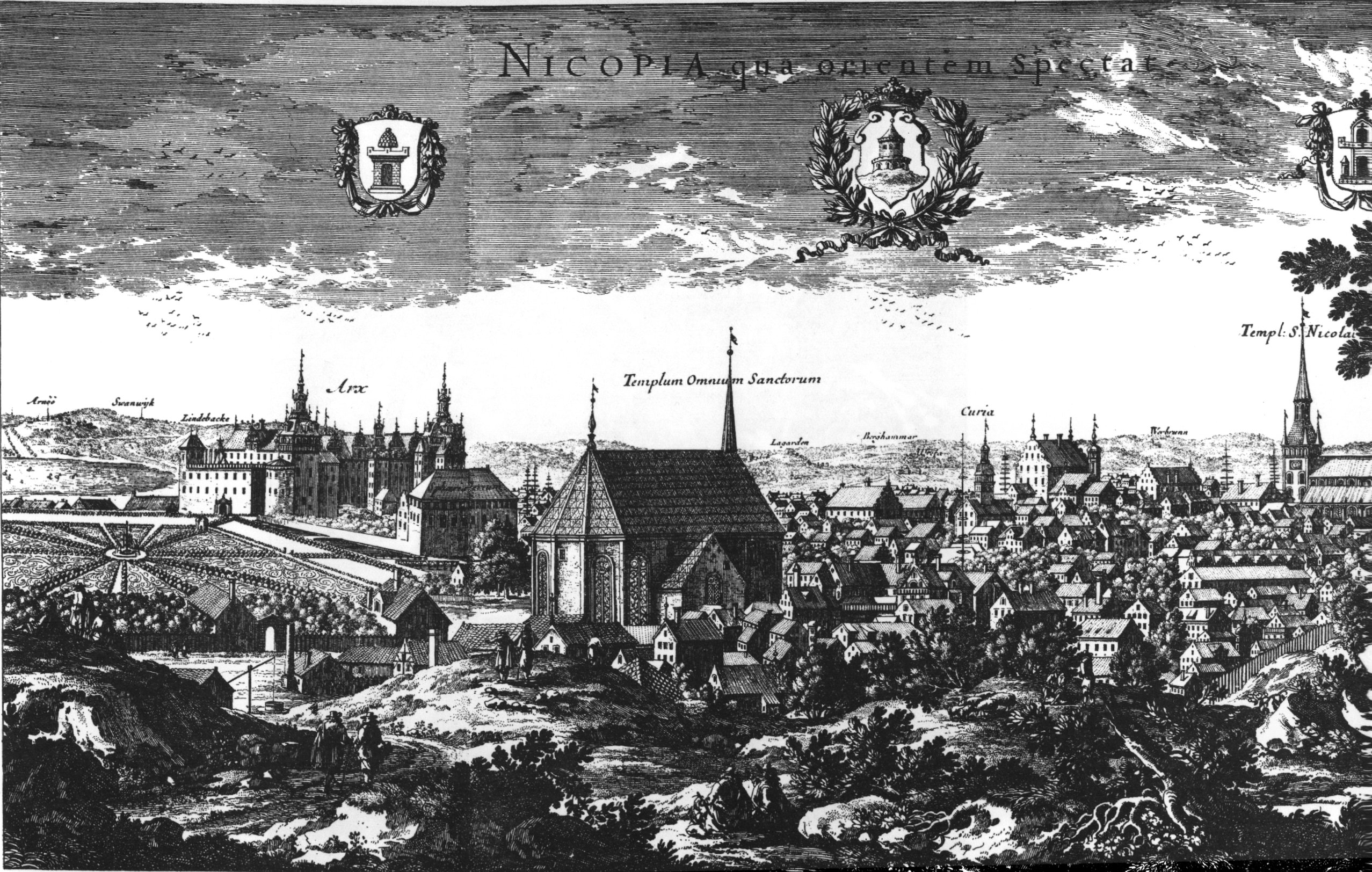
Nyköping, in an engraving from 1690 to 1710

In 1665 large parts of the city including the fortress were damaged in a fire. The same thing happened again in 1719 when Russian troops invaded the city. It was then rebuilt with its current street plan.

Nyköping was industrialized relatively early compared to the rest of Sweden. In the early 19th century, textile industry was established, and the population soon rose as Nyköping's industry grew. In 1879, C.A. Wedholms mejerikärlsfabrik was founded, starting to produce milk churns. Wedholms still has activity in Nyköping and is a milk cooling tank manufacturer.

Map of Nyköping at the end of the 19th century

=== 20th century ===
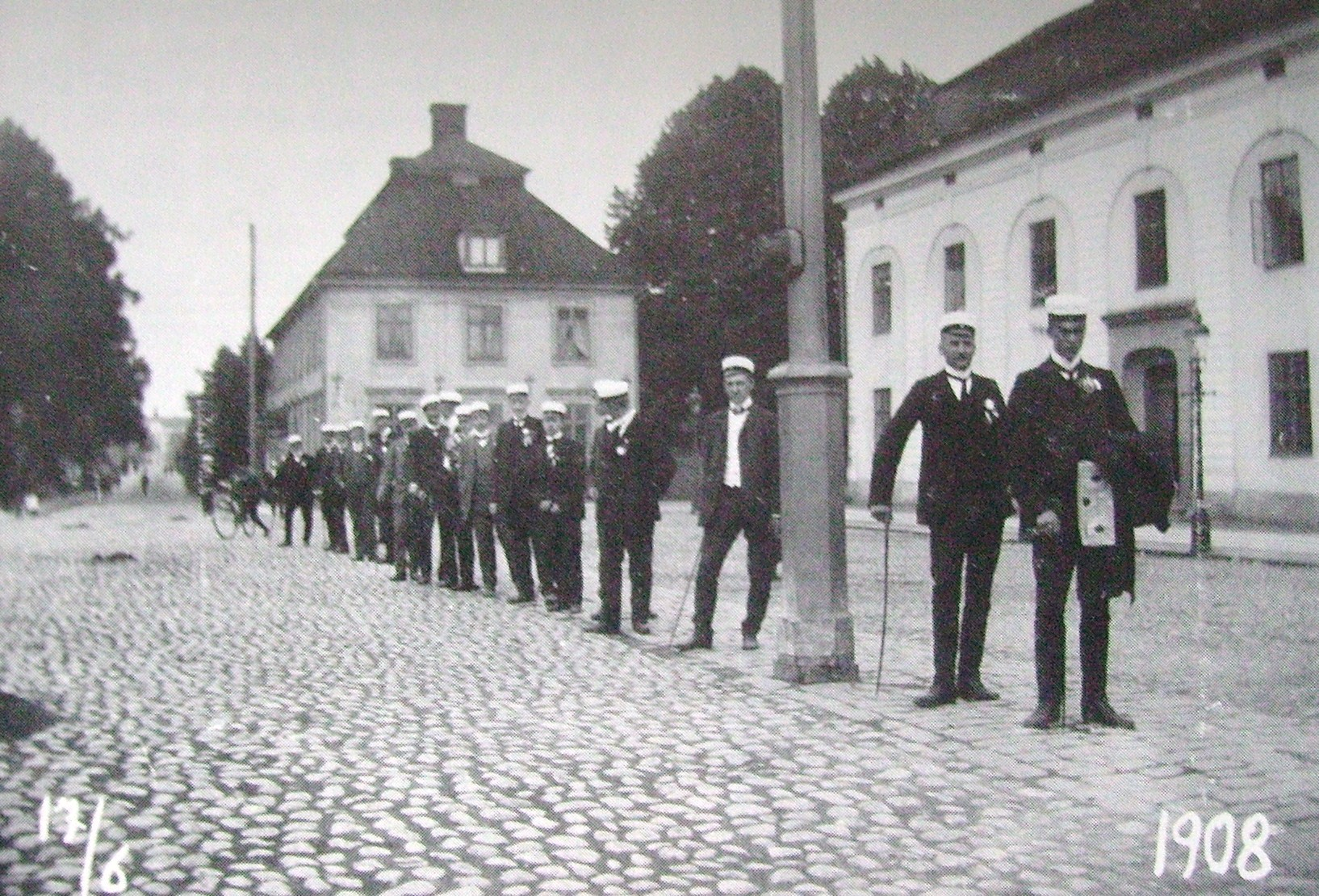
Students pose along the street in 1908

Nyköping was the town where Nordiska Kompaniet had its furniture factory. The business created a spin-off named ANA, which licence-built American and English cars, as Plymouth, De Soto, Hillman and Sunbeam. The company was later purchased by Saab Automobile and led to SAAB becoming the largest employer in the town during the 1980s, as well as the relocation of the headquarters to Spelhagen. But when GM bought SAAB from Investor AB, the headquarters was moved back to Trollhättan and about two thousand lost their jobs.

=== Military history ===
Nyköping has been a stronghold for the reconnaissance squadrons of the Swedish Air Force. Between 1941 and 1980, the nearby Stockholm Skavsta Airport hosted the Södermanland Wing (F 11), which had three squadrons with reconnaissance aircraft. It was the only dedicated reconnaissance wing in the Swedish Air Force. The city has also hosted the flying school of the Swedish Army which was located at Brandholmen between 1963 and 1985.

== Geography ==
=== Position ===
Nyköping lies about 100 kilometres (62 mi) south-west of the capital Stockholm along the Baltic Sea. It is roughly 60 kilometres (37 mi) north-east of Norrköping, both cities being accessible by highway-divided motorway. It is also about 80 kilometres (50 mi) south of Eskilstuna; the largest settlement of the county. The northern areas of the city is on exactly the same parallel of 58° 46' N as Canadian "polar bear capital of the world" Churchill, demonstrating how warm the climate is in comparison in spite of its northerly latitude. The southern edge of the municipality also straddles the same parallel as the northernmost point of mainland Scotland at Thurso – that has a much more narrower range of temperature. The southern edge of the municipality is the southernmost point of Svealand, the middle of Sweden's traditional three crown lands that once formed the country. The city is located at a few miles more southerly latitude than the country's northernmost west coast town of Strömstad. The line of 17°E goes through Nyköping, thus the city is eight minutes ahead in solar time of the GMT +1 line that Sweden follows for its time zone.

=== Living environment ===
Nyköping is the exodus of a small river named Nyköpingsån (Nyköping River), which runs through the city centre, dividing the city into a natural eastern and western part. Due to the narrowness of the river, there are a full seven crossings available for automobile traffic, one of them being for the E4. For pedestrians and bikers, an additional seven bridges are available, and in addition to that there is also one bridge for train traffic. All automobile bridges except E4 also carry pedestrian sidewalks, which means transport is seldom made longer than the actual distance. There is also a small pedestrian bridge in an unpopulated nature reserve called Hållet that is very close to the E4 route.

The small river Kilaån separates Nyköping and Arnö, with that river being even narrower. Also separating Nyköping and Arnö is the so-called Stadsfjärden (the City bay), which is a bay stretching around the Arnö peninsula down to the neighboring municipality of Oxelösund. Stadsfjärden is primarily used for tourist shipping and canoeing, with an internationally renowned canoeing stadium being situated along the northern shore. The port is much smaller than Oxelösund's and is primarily used for civil traffic, as opposed to cargo shipments and ferry traffic which is dominated by nearby ports of Oxelösund and Nynäshamn. This is due to the port being some 15 kilometres from open sea as opposed to Oxelösund's position on the edge of the peninsula. Even though Nyköping is a relatively flat city there are some hills in the northern parts of the town, barely reaching 50 metres altitude. The city centre is essentially just above sea level and does not rise above 20 metres altitude, although it contains hills surrounding it.

=== Populated areas of Nyköping ===
- Brandholmen
- Brandkärr
- Bryngelstorp
- Ekensberg
- Fågelbo
- Isaksdal
- Harg
- Herrhagen (at Arnö)
- Högbrunn
- Kuggnäs (at Arnö)
- Långsätter (at Arnö)
- Malmbryggshagen
- Myntan (at Arnö)
- Oppeby
- Oxbacken
- Påljungshage
- Rosenkälla
- Stenkulla
- Väster (the West)
- Öster (the East)
- Östra bergen (the Eastern Mountains)

The area of Gumsbacken only carries a large shopping mall centre but is part of the city proper.

=== Connected areas ===
The rural localities of Sjösa, Bergshammar, Svalsta and Enstaberga located within 10 kilometres (6.2 mi) are connected to the city centre by cycle tracks with permanent lighting. In addition there is a nature and coastal area called Tjuvholmen east of the city centre that is part of the locality with many holiday homes. Tjuvholmen lacks an asphalted access road and is in general seen as a rural area in spite of its proximity to the city centre. East of Arnö on the southern shore there are similar areas such as Örstig, which is connected by asphalt road and cycle tracks to Arnö and Nyköping. Other nearby rural areas on the southern shore include holiday home areas such as Linudden and Örstigsnäs, as well as the coastal camping place of Strandstugeviken. There is also lighted cycling tracks all the way south roughly 15 kilometres (9.3 mi) to the neighbouring city Oxelösund, making pedestrian and biking transport to nearby areas effective and avoids potentially dangerous contacts with motor vehicles.

== Elections ==
Nyköping is the seat of Nyköping Municipality and this table just records how the urban area (including Arnö) has voted, contrasting with the rural electoral wards.

=== Riksdag ===
Year	%	Votes	V	S	MP	C	L	KD	M	SD	ND	Other
1973	91.5	20,920	3.3	53.9		20.1	7.2	2.0	13.0			0.5
1976	91.9	21,930	3.3	53.4		17.3	10.0	1.7	14.0			0.4
1979	90.8	21,533	4.1	54.6		12.0	9.5	1.6	17.7			0.5
1982	91.2	21,967	4.6	54.9	1.7	10.9	5.0	1.8	21.0			0.2
1985	89.0	22,017	4.0	53.8	1.6	7.8	13.3		19.3			0.3
1988	86.7	21,245	4.8	51.2	5.0	7.1	11.9	2.3	17.3			0.5
1991	88.2	21,210	3.6	44.7	2.5	5.9	9.0	6.5	20.3		6.7	0.9
1994	87.1	21,560	5.2	53.3	4.2	4.7	7.1	3.7	20.3		0.7	0.9
1998	82.1	20,168	10.7	44.7	3.9	3.5	4.6	11.8	19.3			1.7
2002	81.1	20,444	7.7	49.1	4.0	3.6	12.3	9.0	13.0	0.7		0.6
2006	82.1	21,026	4.8	42.3	5.1	5.2	7.3	7.5	23.8	2.0		1.9
2010	83.8	22,502	4.6	36.0	8.6	4.3	7.5	5.5	27.6	4.9		1.0
2014	85.4	23,751	4.8	35.6	7.9	4.4	4.9	4.5	23.6	11.1		3.2
2018	85.9	24,430	6.6	33.7	4.6	7.4	5.1	6.3	20.9	14.0		1.4

== Transportation ==
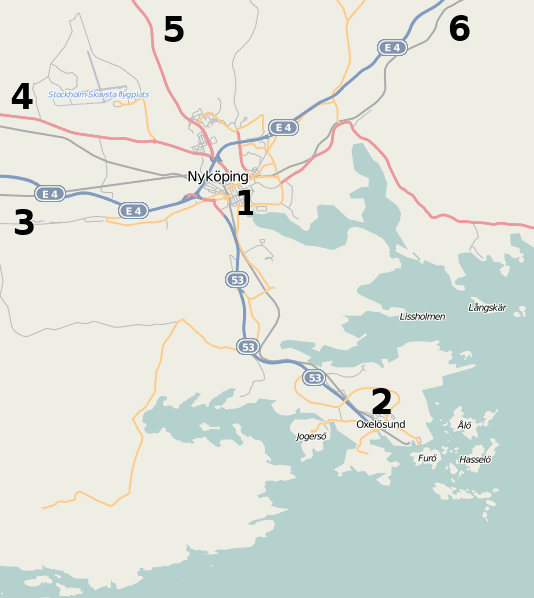
Map of regional transportation, showing (1) Nyköping, (2) Oxelösund, (3) motorway E4 and railroad towards the airport, Norrköping and Malmö, (4) road 52 and railroad towards Katrineholm and Kumla, (5) road 53 towards Malmköping and Eskilstuna, (6) motorway E4 and railroad towards Södertälje and Stockholm

=== Buses ===
Nyköping's intercity and city bus-links are operated by Nobina Sverige. The city bus network consists of seven lines:

Number	Origin	Final destination	Frequency	Distance
1	Bryngelstorp	Harg	Every 15 minutes	11.4 km (7.1 mi)
2	Arnö	Brandkärr	Every 15 minutes	7.8 km (4.8 mi)
3	Bus station	Brandholmen	Twice an hour	3.4 km (2.1 mi)
160	Myntan (North Arnö)	Myntan (North Arnö)	Every 40 minutes	NA
161	Bus station	Bus station (via Brandkärr)	10 times/day	NA
162	Bus station	Bus station (via Isaksdal)	10 times/day	NA
164	Bryngelstorp	Bus station	Morning bus, 1 time/day	NA

Map of city bus lines

Coaches to Stockholm and Gothenburg are operated by Flixbus.

=== Rail ===
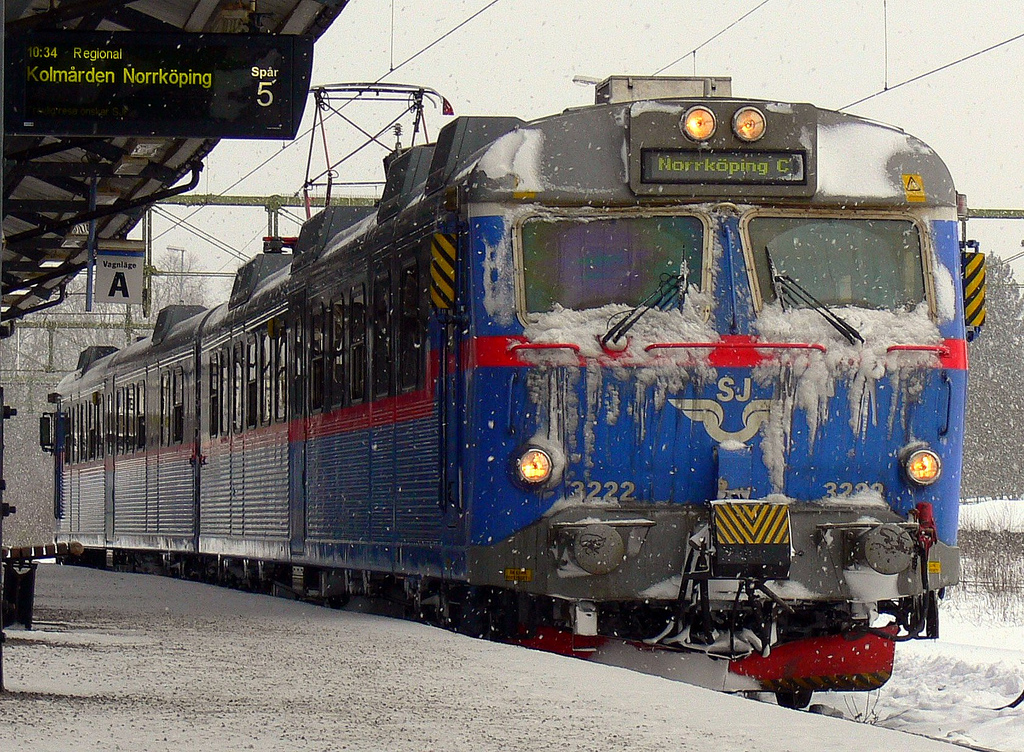
A SJ X12 at the "Nyköping C" railway station

The city is located on a branch line to the Södra stambanan. Scheduled railway connections on the line is provided by SJ AB. These are mostly operated by Rc-hauled trainsets. SJ does currently not operate any X 2000 services to Nyköping.

Line	Vehicles	Operator
Stockholm – Nyköping – Norrköping	SJ Rc	SJ AB

The planned new high-speed rail Ostlänken going from Stockholm to Linköping will have two stops in the city, one at the new planned train station and one at Skavsta Airport. The railway will later be connected with the planned high-speed rail Götalandsbanan going from Linköping to Gothenburg, which will make it possible to go from Stockholm to Gothenburg in two hours. It is planned to be finished between 2033 and 2035.

=== Air ===
Stockholm-Skavsta Airport offers intra-European routes on Ryanair and Wizz Air. The airport is located about 10 kilometers outside of the city and is connected with bus from the city center. The nearest large airport is Stockholm Arlanda Airport which is located 137 km (85 mi) north east of Nyköping.

== Climate ==
Nyköping has, along with the rest of Mälardalen, a relatively mild humid continental climate (Dfb). In recent decades, the climate has more resembled a four-season oceanic climate. Winter averages around the freezing point during daytime with only the cold nights causing winter conditions in many winters. Summer average highs are between 20 °C (68 °F) and 23 °C (73 °F) depending on month and weather patterns. However, both summers and winters have been significantly warmer and colder, respectively, than the averages. Temperatures over 30 °C (86 °F) are occasional but not overly common, with temperatures above 32 °C (90 °F) unknown in recent decades. Winters are normally tempered by the Gulf Stream influence from the west and the Baltic Sea to the east, but when cold air breaks through cold temperatures can occur, sometimes for a prolonged time. As typical of southern Sweden there is a slight seasonal lag, meaning that the warmest period is often occurring during the second half of summer.

The seaside effect due to southerlies frequently travelling over water often prevents heat waves from impacting Nyköping, resulting in lower diurnals with very mild nights, while Norrköping to its west often is hot during the day and cools down at night.

The inland areas of the municipality are very much similar to the coastal areas, but the weather station at Skavsta shows lower summer mean temperatures than Oxelösund, indicating that the inner city wider urban area nearer the water has milder nights year round. Both stations are within a meteorological relevant range from the city centre.

After many years without any weather station, the SMHI set up a precipitation reader in Nyköping in 2020. The nearest temperature station is seaside at Femöre in Oxelösund, about 10 kilometres (6.2 mi) south by air. Nyköping is slightly warmer during the day than Oxelösund during summer and shoulder seasons, while being somewhat colder during winter days and nights year round.

Climate data for Nyköping
Month	Jan	Feb	Mar	Apr	May	Jun	Jul	Aug	Sep	Oct	Nov	Dec	Year
Mean daily maximum °C (°F)	1 (34)	1 (34)	6 (43)	11 (52)	16 (61)	20 (68)	23 (73)	22 (72)	17 (63)	11 (52)	6 (43)	3 (37)	11 (53)
Mean daily minimum °C (°F)	−4 (25)	−4 (25)	−2 (28)	1 (34)	6 (43)	10 (50)	13 (55)	12 (54)	8 (46)	4 (39)	2 (36)	−2 (28)	4 (39)
Average precipitation mm (inches)	40.8 (1.61)	27.2 (1.07)	28.2 (1.11)	32.2 (1.27)	33.1 (1.30)	46.0 (1.81)	66.4 (2.61)	58.4 (2.30)	56.7 (2.23)	50.8 (2.00)	56.2 (2.21)	49.0 (1.93)	544.9 (21.45)
Source: SMHI.se

== Sports ==
Nyköping has two major sport clubs:

- Nyköpings Boll- och Idrottsällskap is the local Division 2 football club; they play their home matches at the Rosvalla Nyköping Eventcenter.
- Nyköpings Hockey is the local ice hockey club; its home rink is PEAB Arena.

Other clubs are football club Harg, the football and handball teams of IFK Nyköping and also includes Onyx in floorball.

The city is yet to have a team in the major football or hockey leagues of Sweden, with stints in the second tiers being the greatest achievements for both main sides.

== Gallery ==
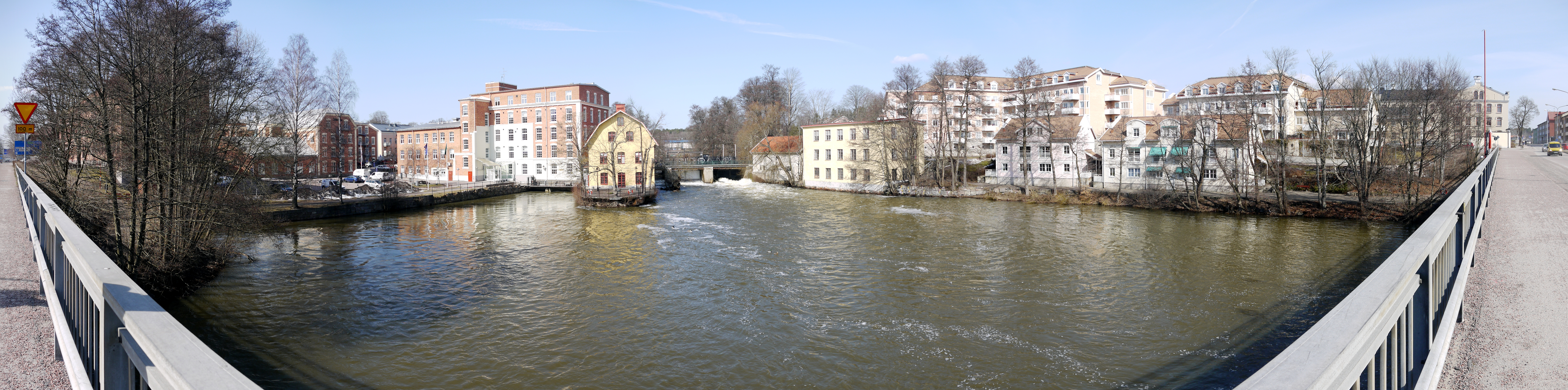
Panoramic view of the northern downtown Forsbron part of Nyköping (2010)

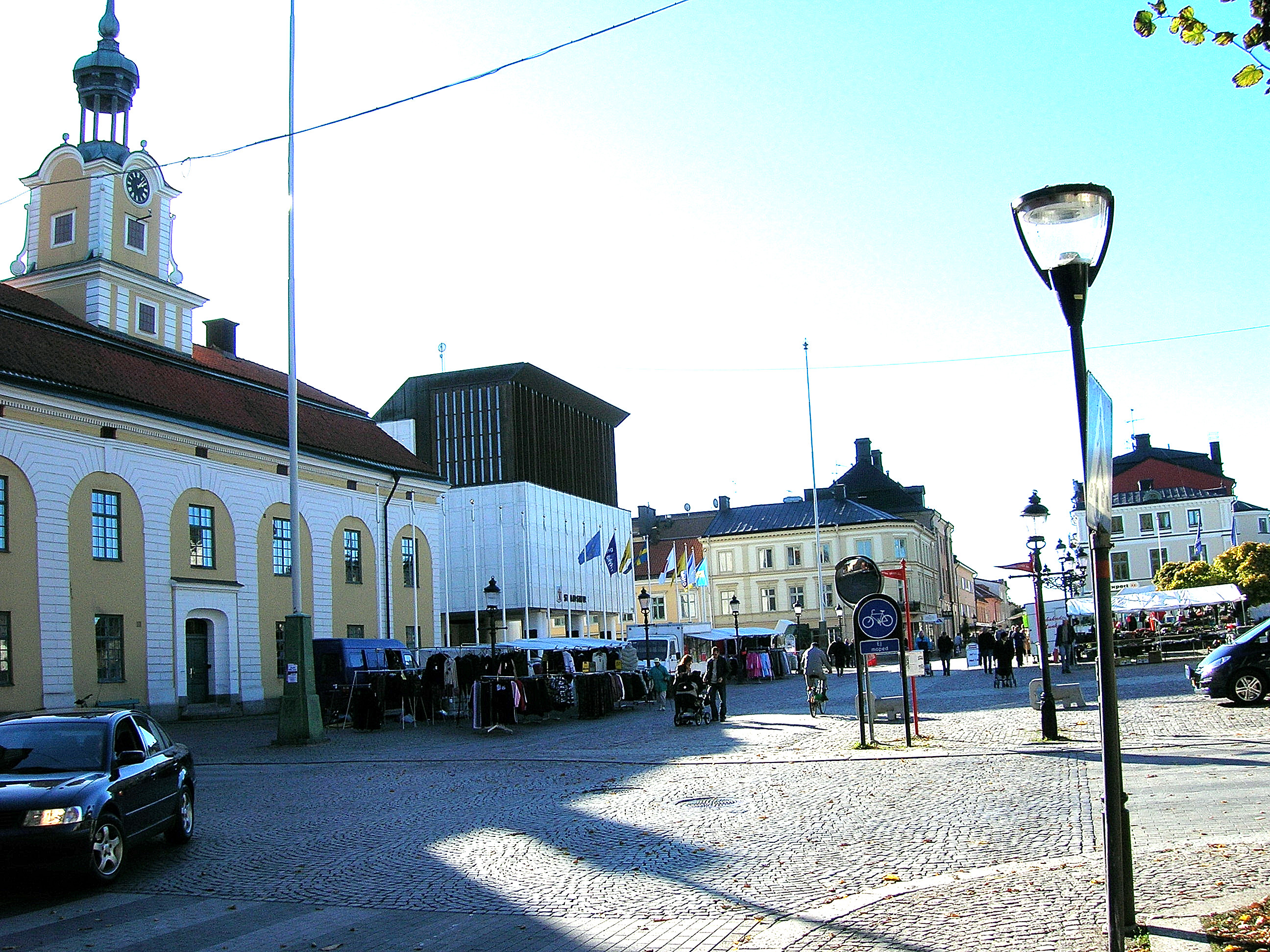
City hall

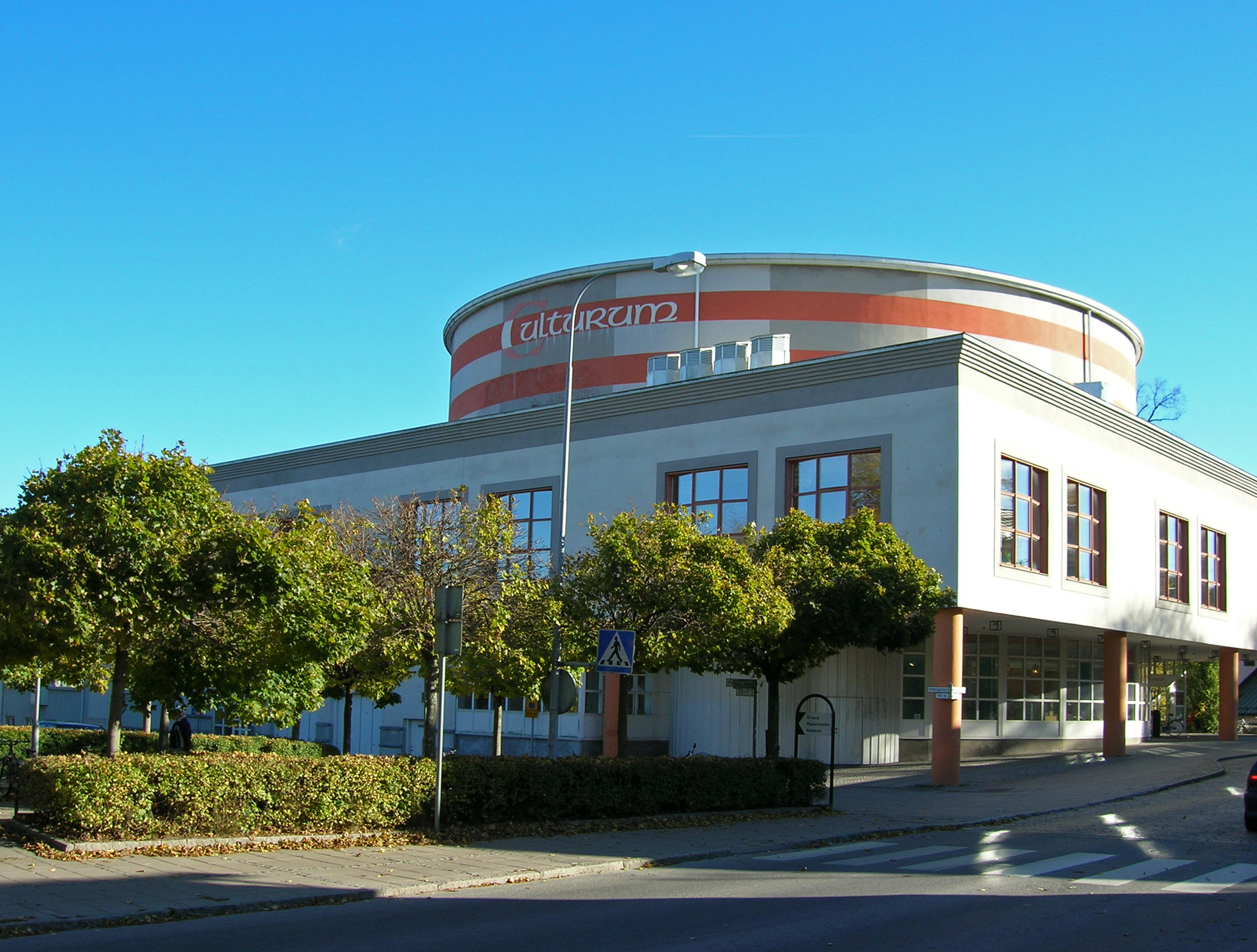
Library and cultural center

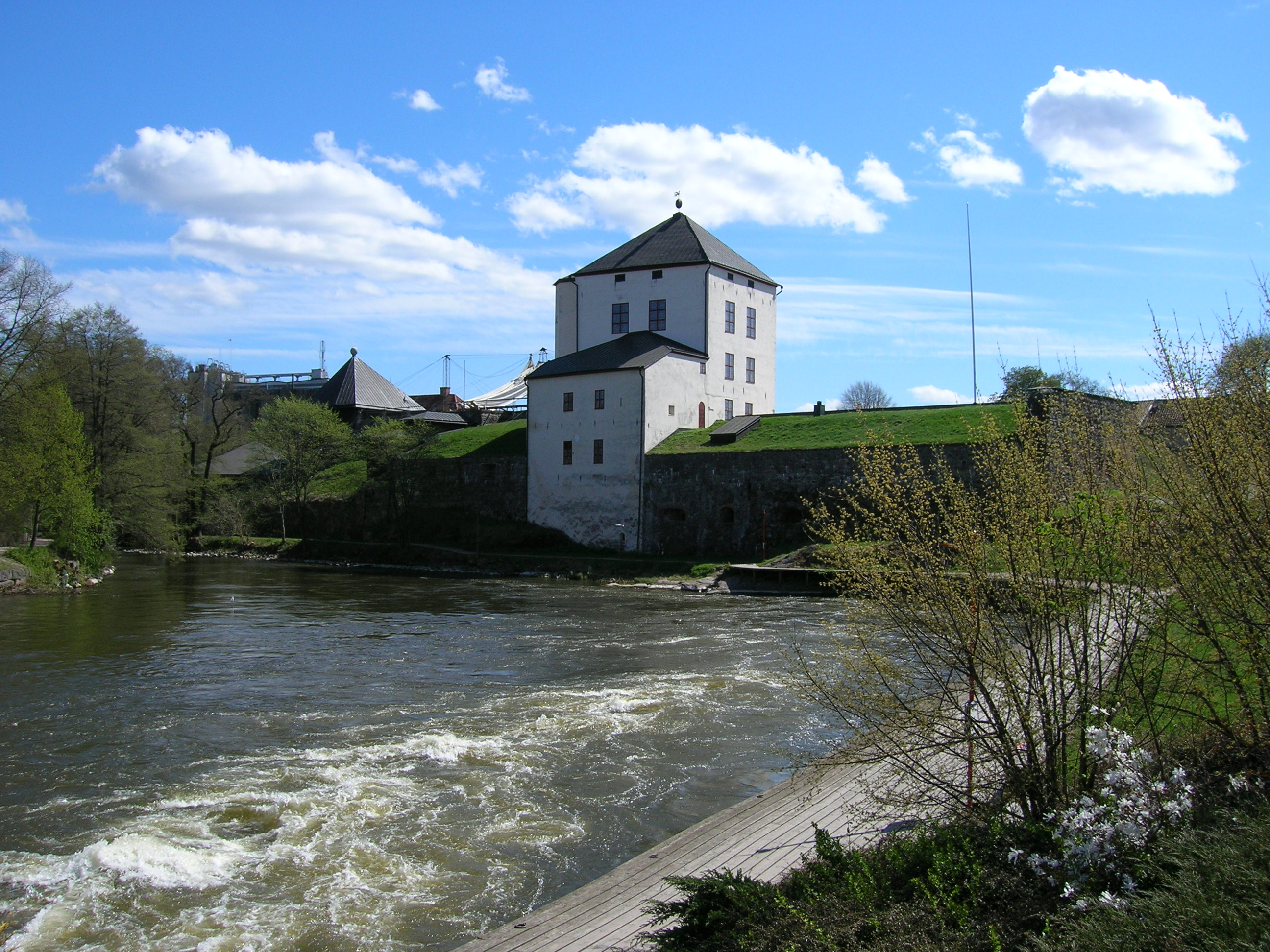
Nyköping Castle

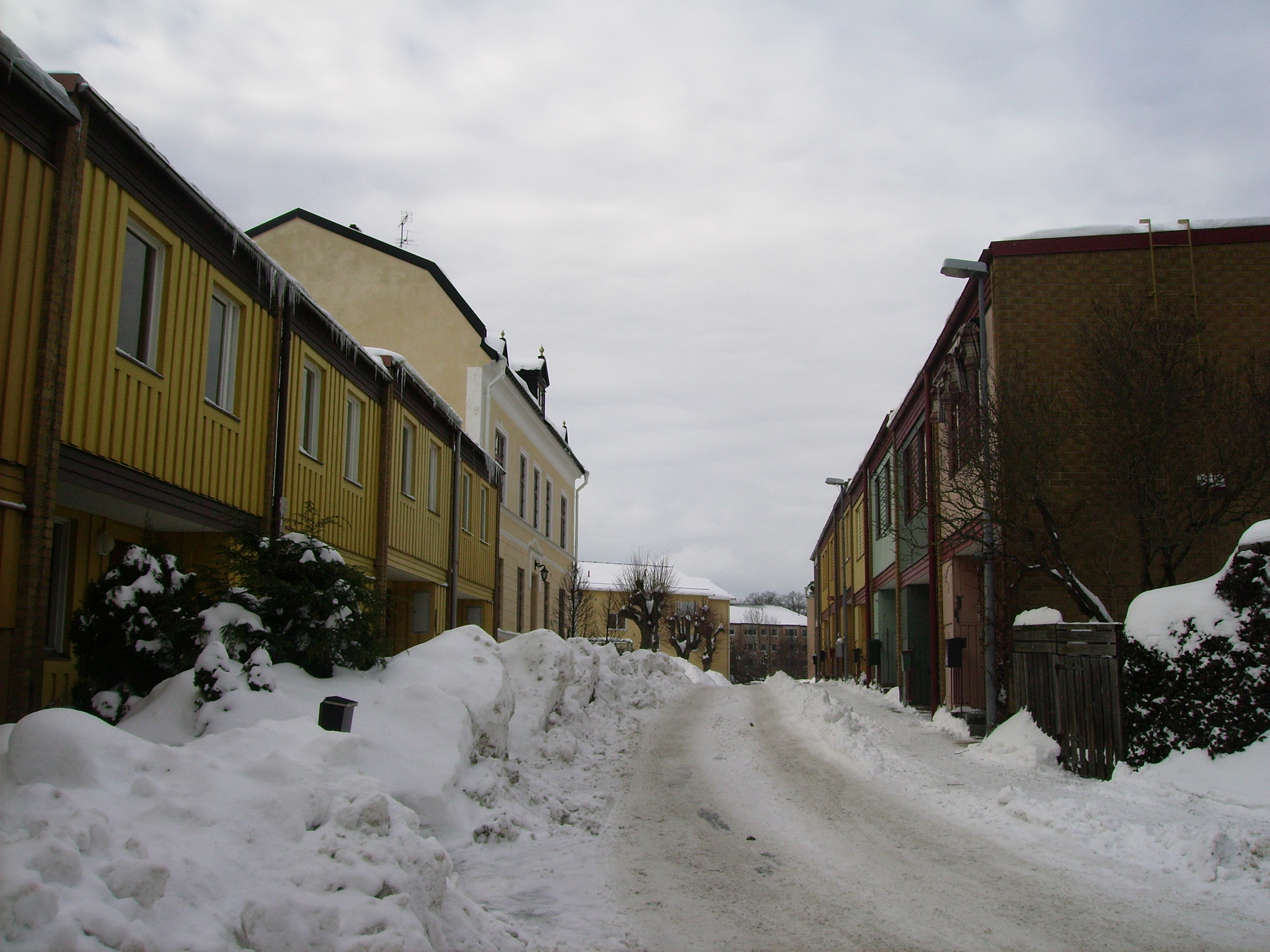
Vattengränd, the oldest street in Nyköping

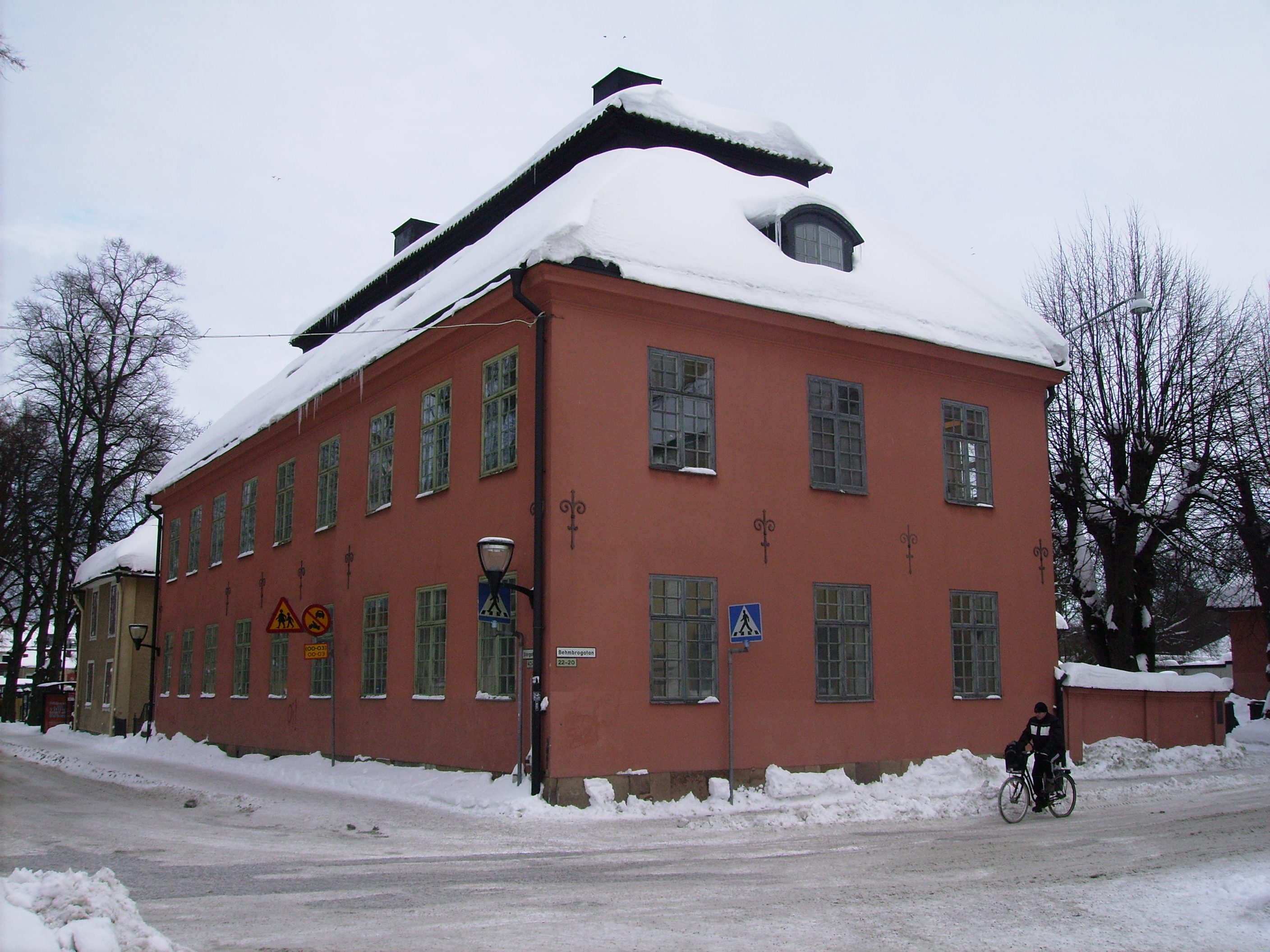
Westerlingska gården

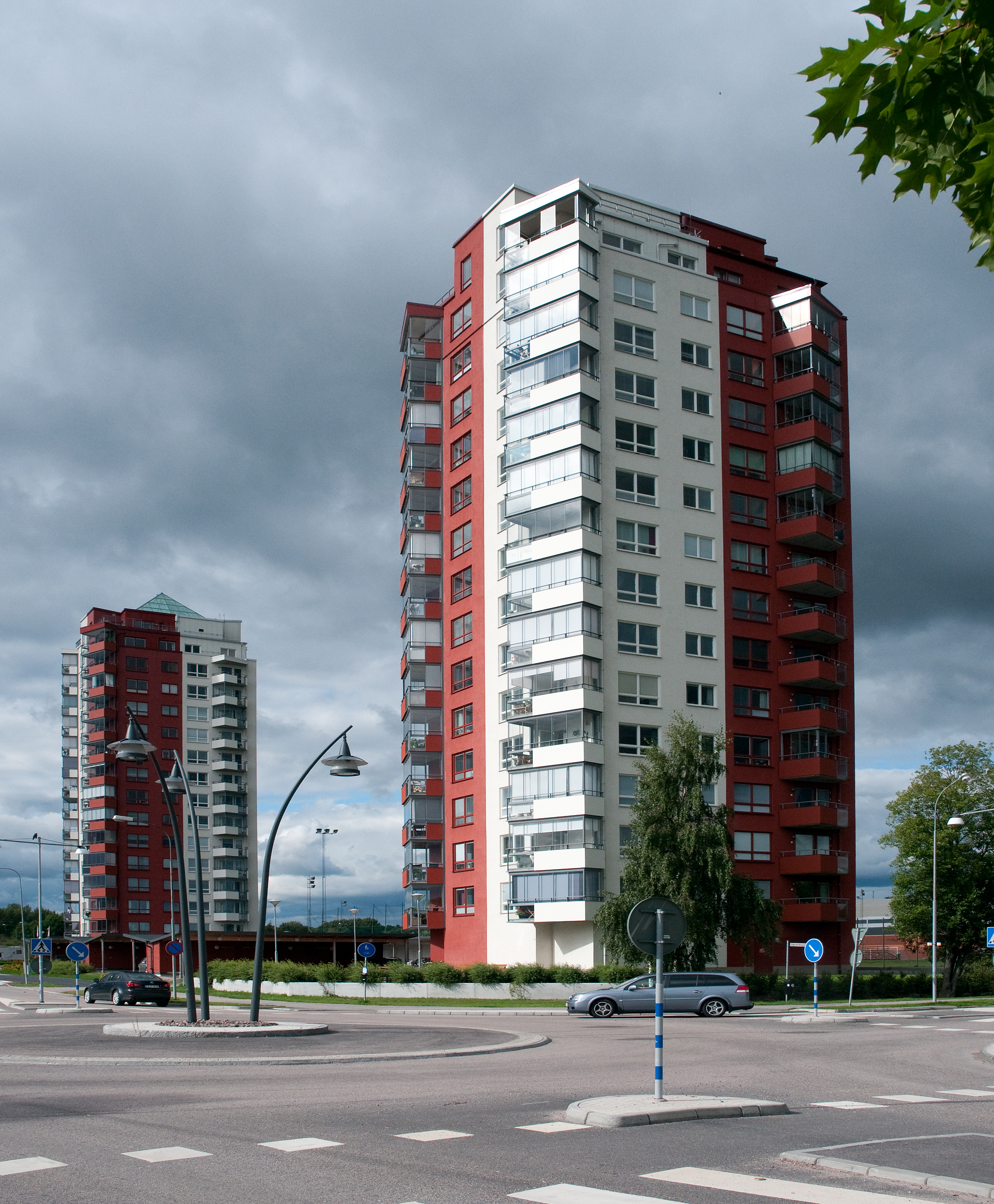
Rosvalla Highrise

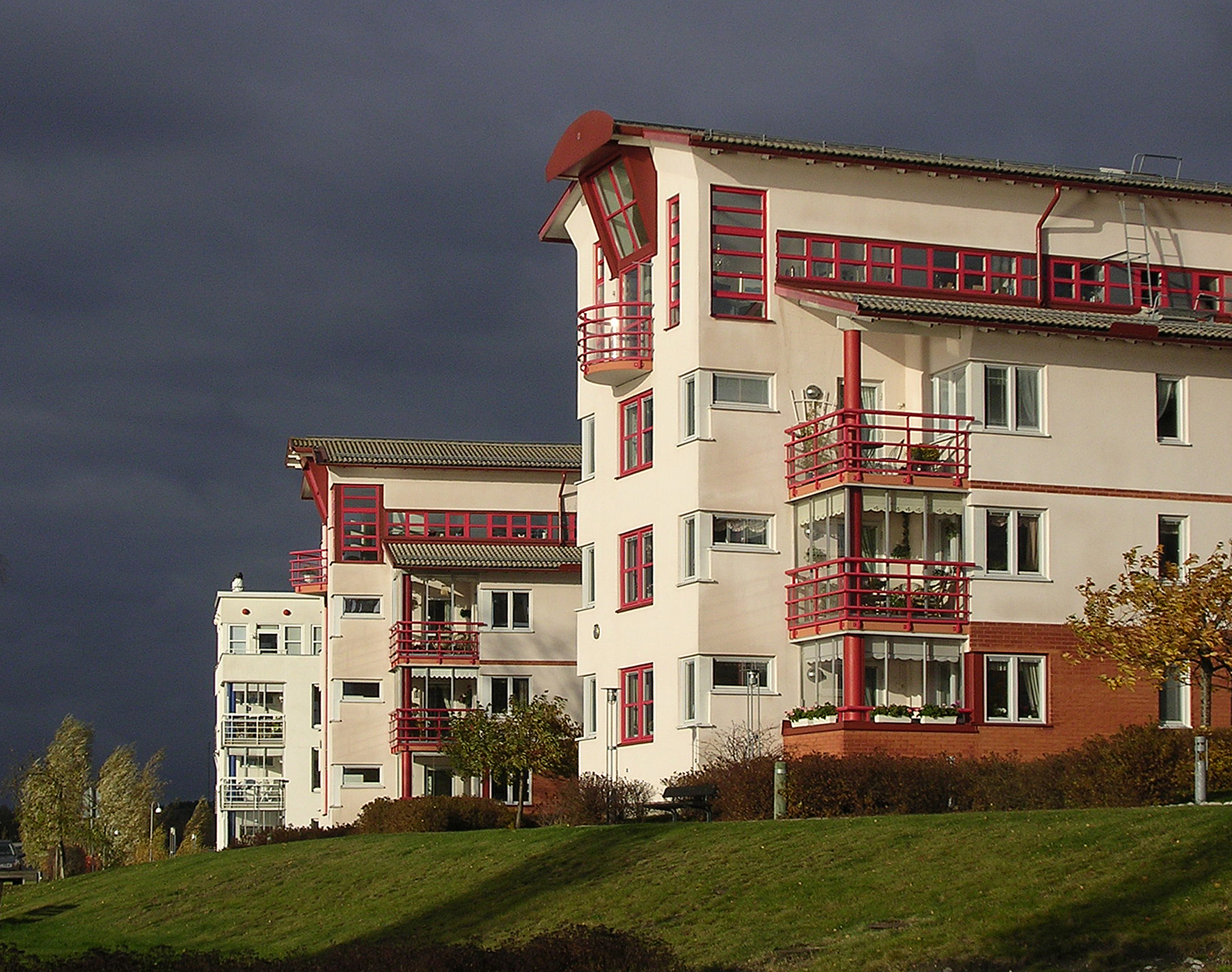
Brandholmen Seaside houses

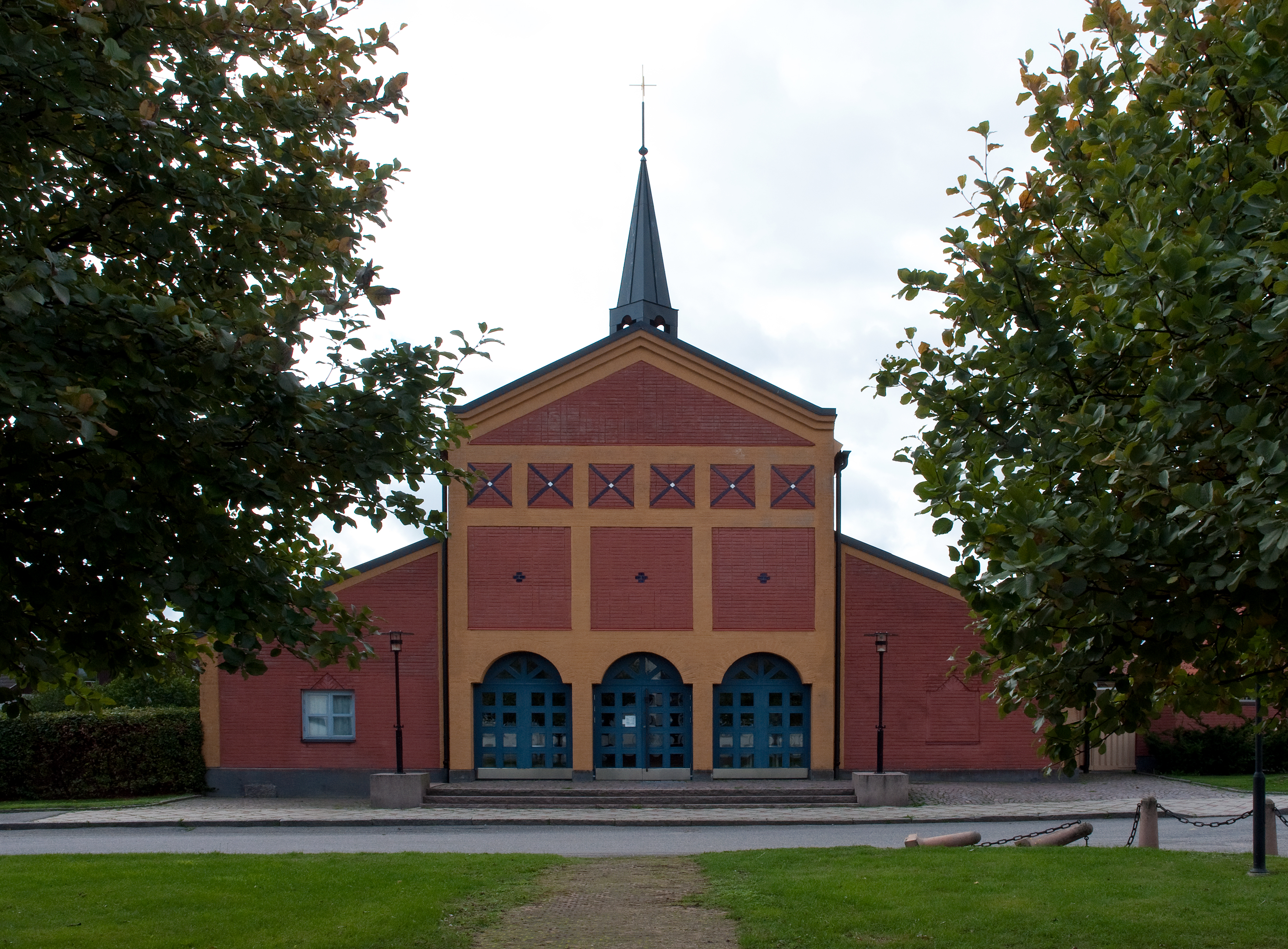
Sankta Anna Catholic Church

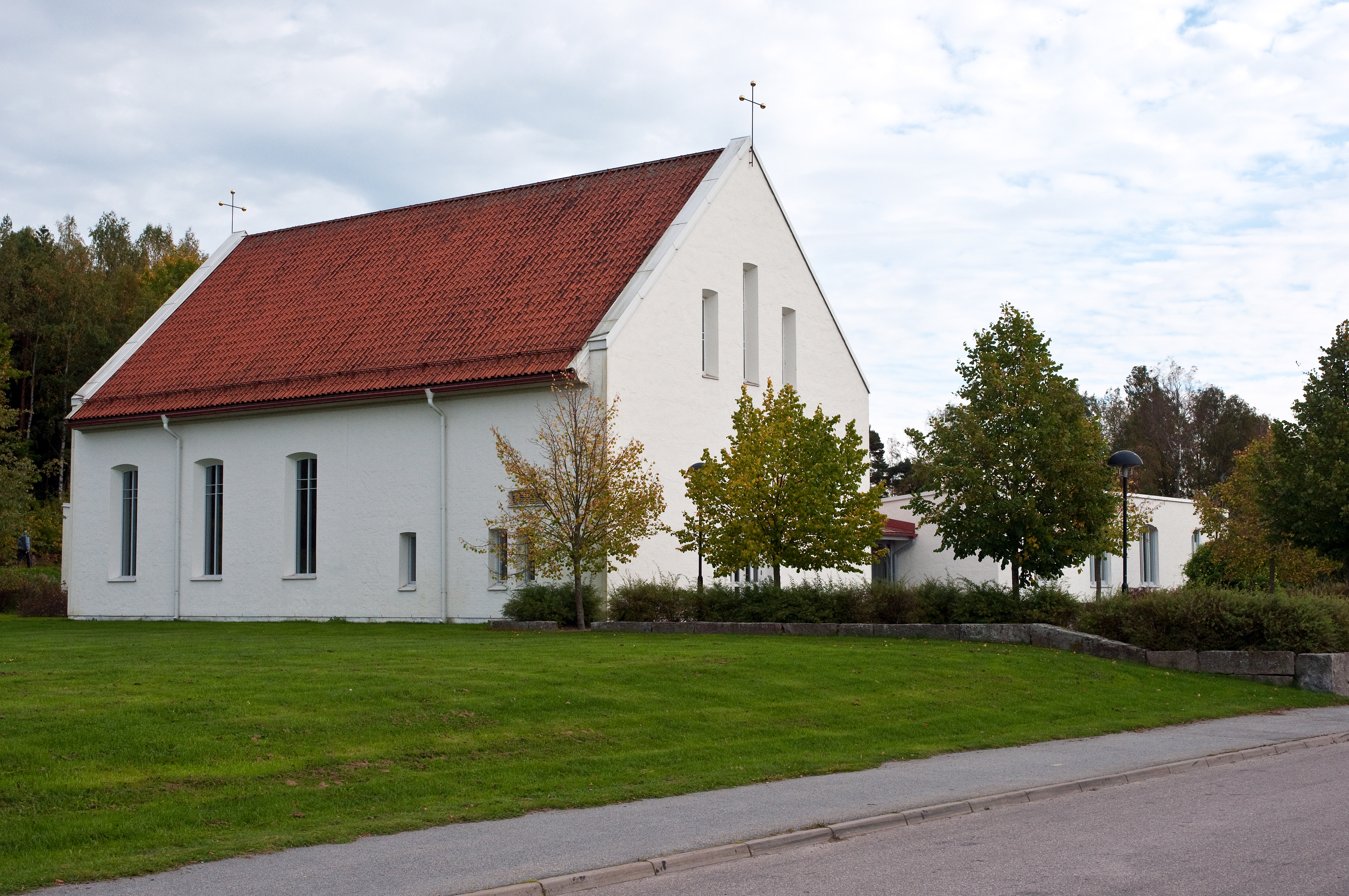
Sankta Katarina Lutheran Church, Arnö

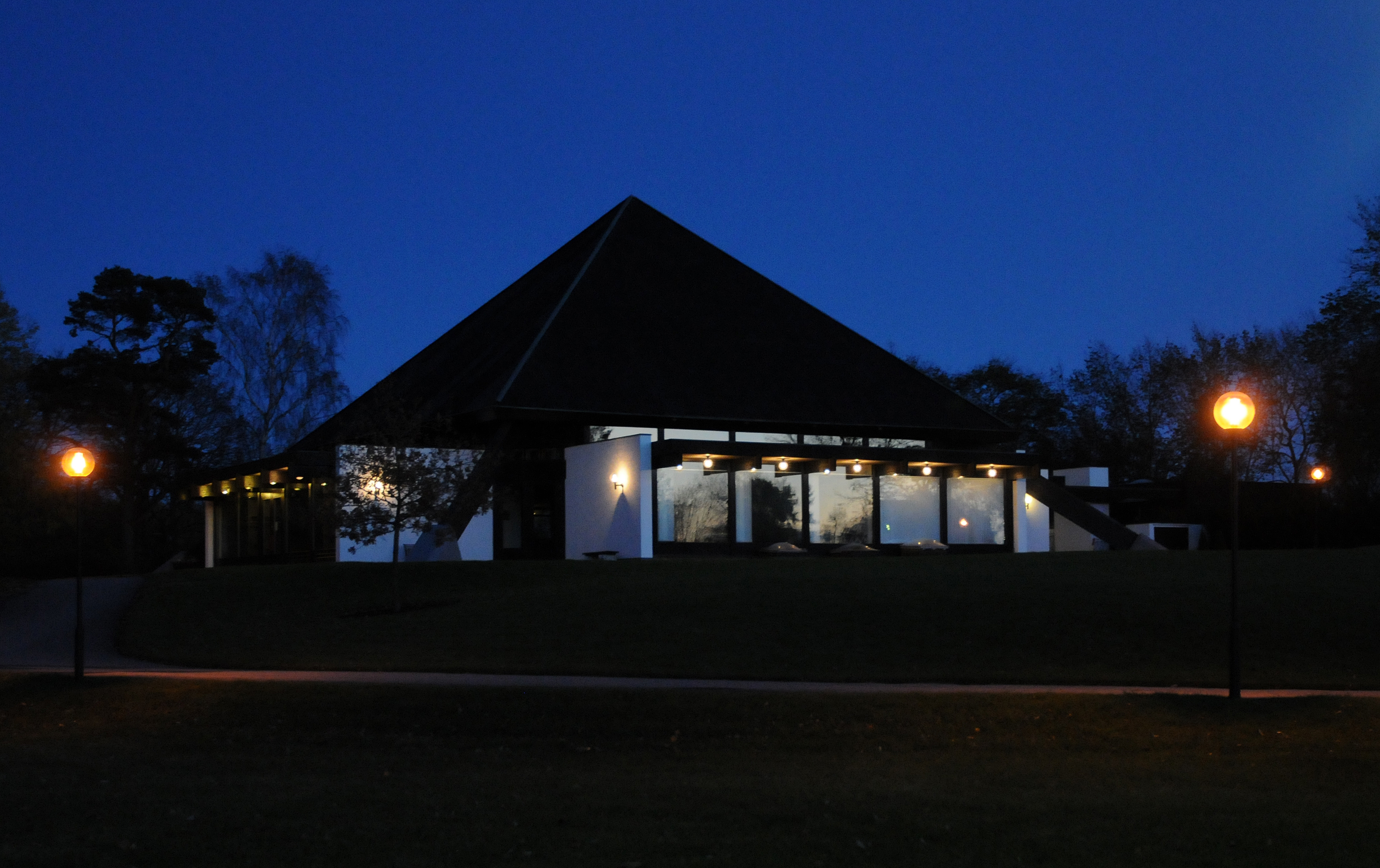
Hjortensberg Pentecostal Church

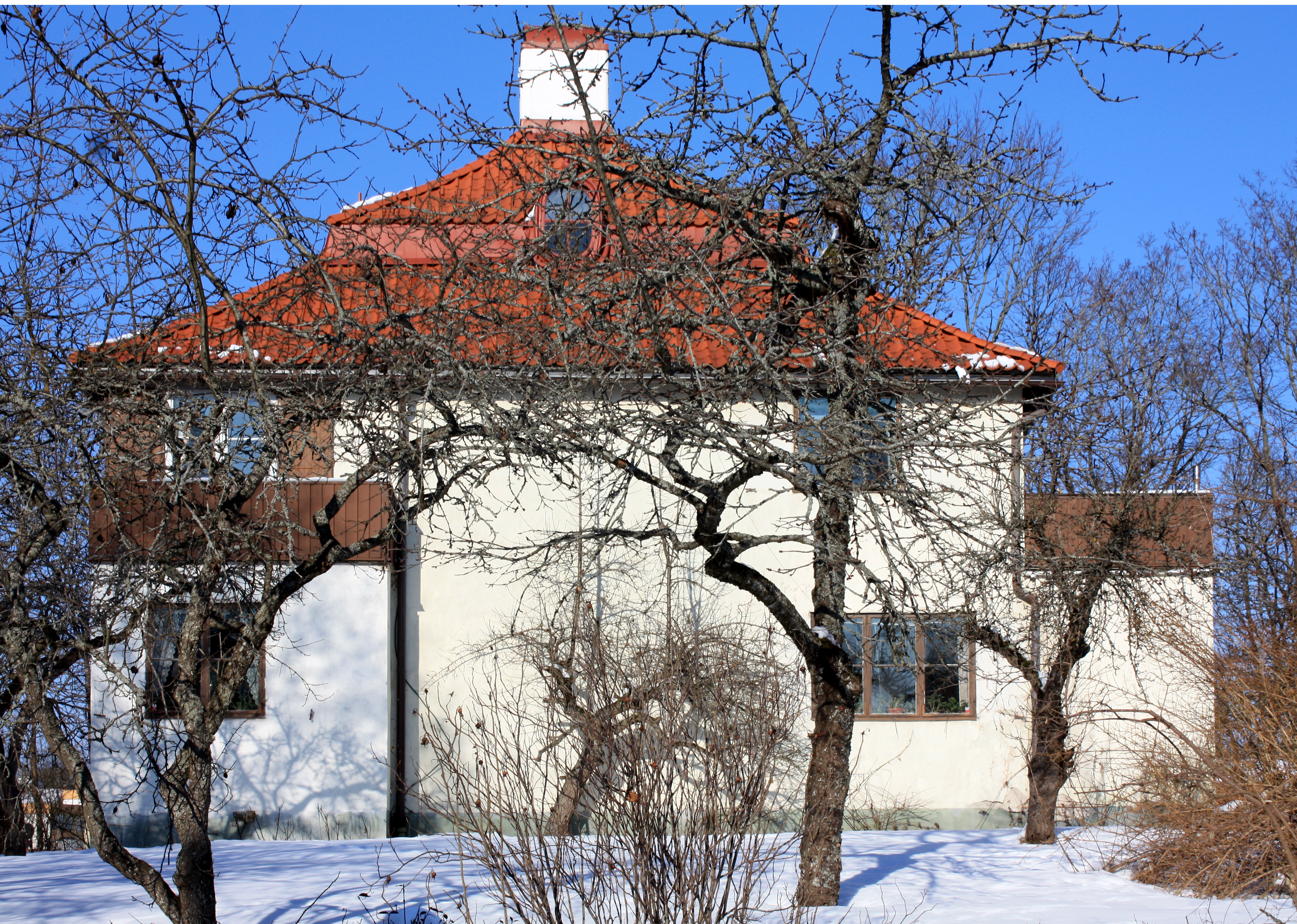
Villa Sturegården, by architect Gunnar Asplund

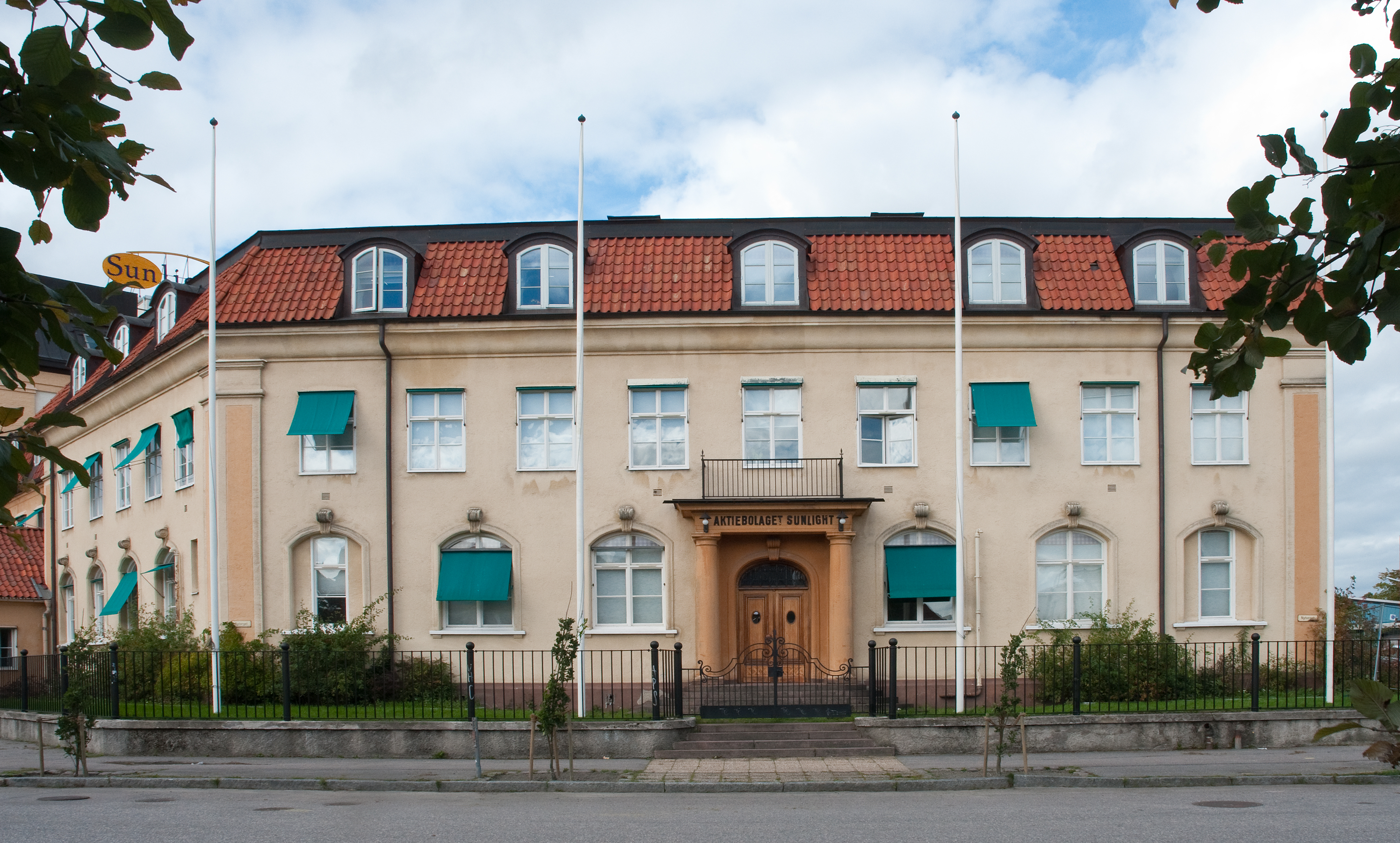
Former headquarters of Sunlights AB

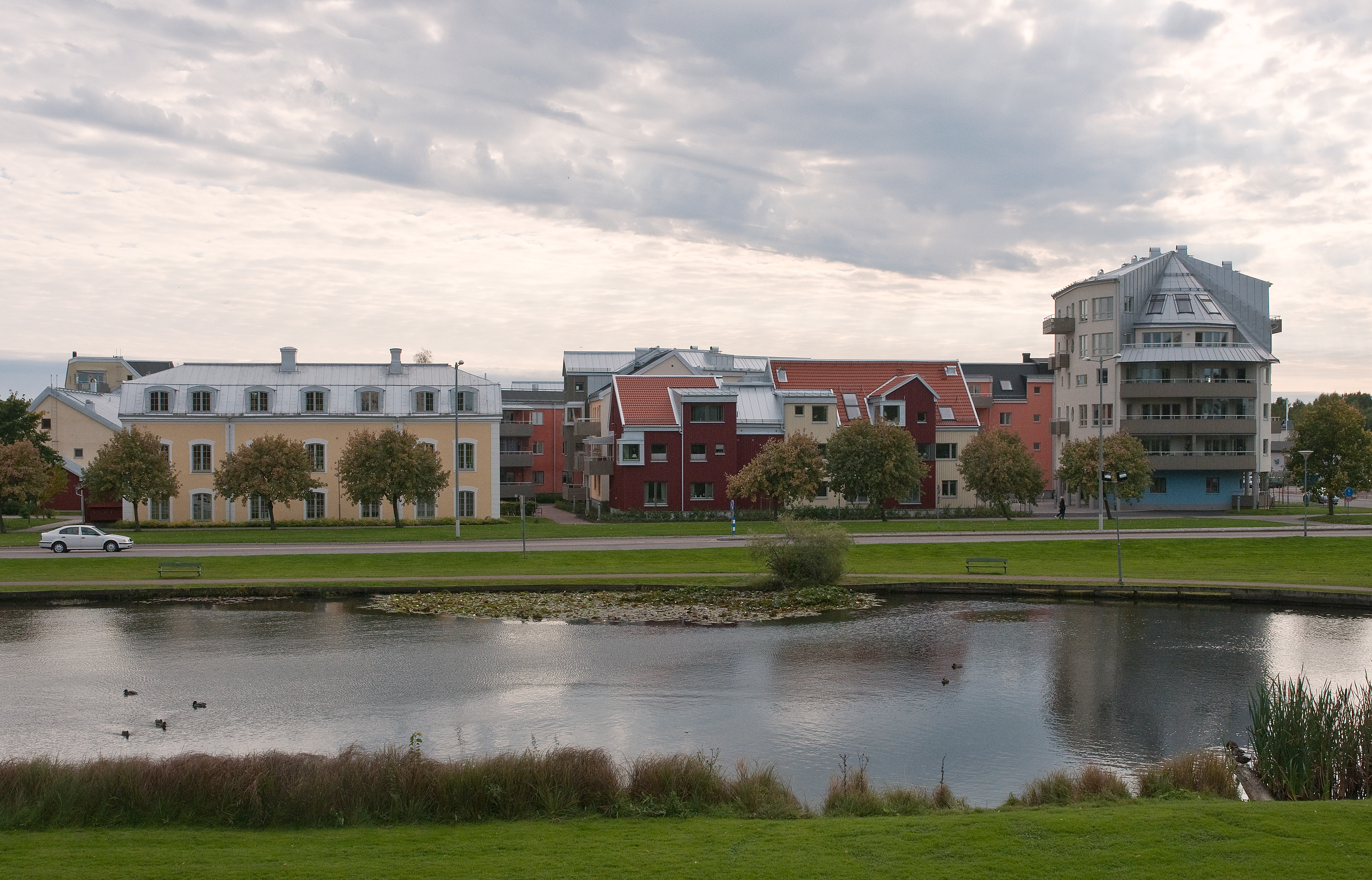
Spelhagen, former location of AB Nyköpings Automobilfabrik

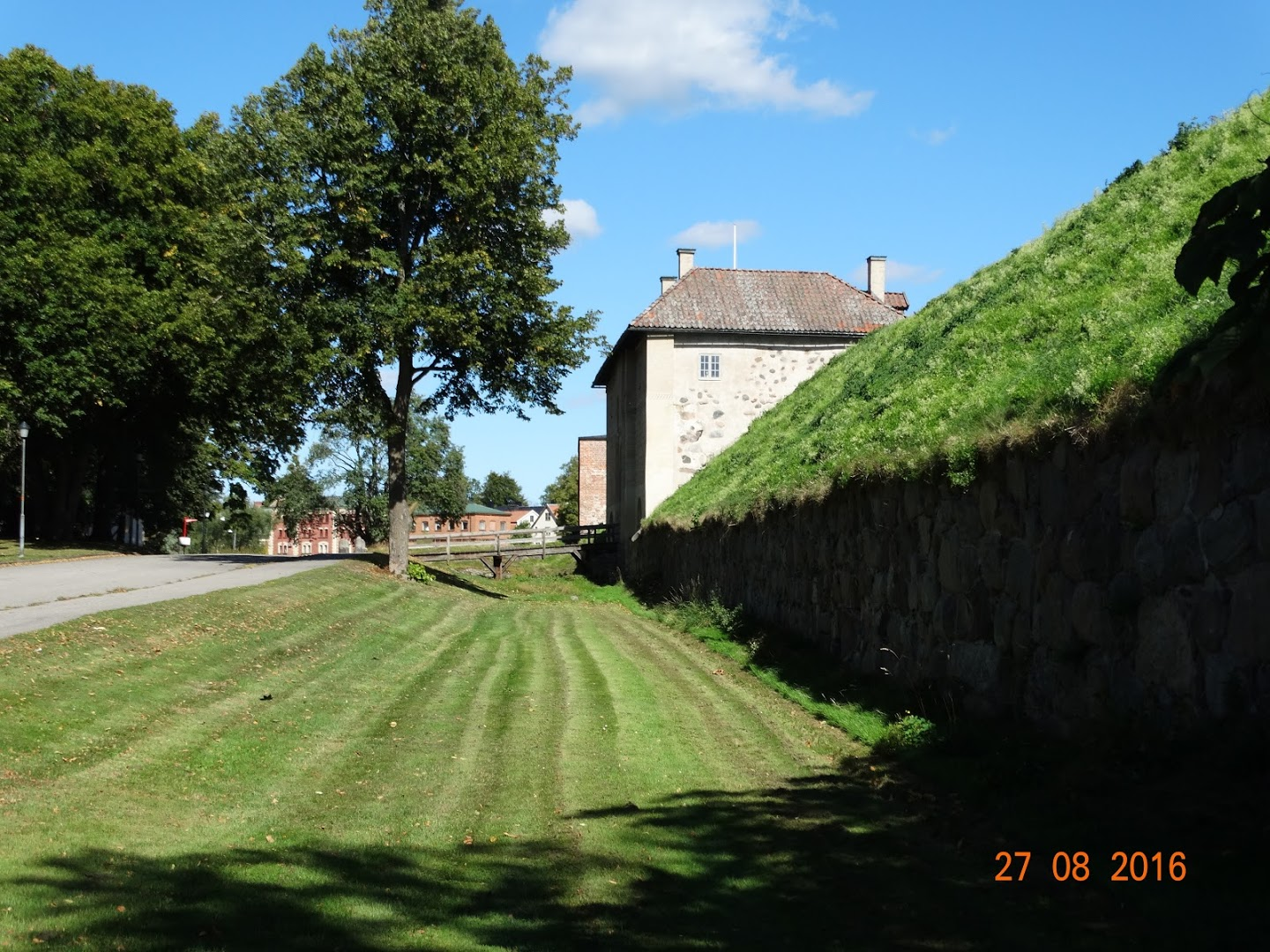
Castle main gate

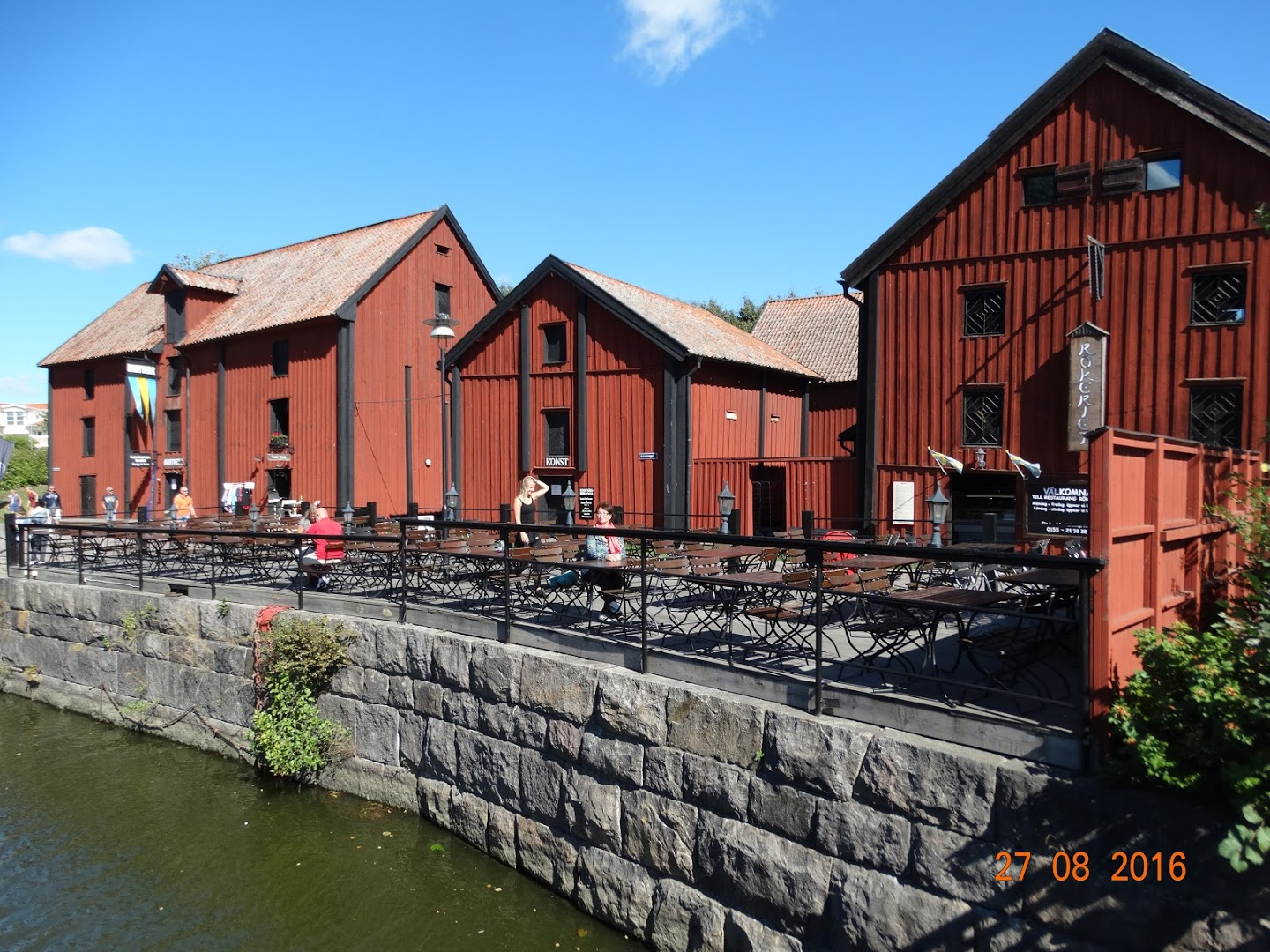
Rökeriet Nyköping

== Twin cities ==
- Iisalmi, Finland
- Lauf an der Pegnitz, Germany
- Notodden, Norway
- Nykøbing Falster, Denmark
- Salacgrīva, Latvia
- Kangaroo Point, Australia
- Ōarai, Japan
