= Intelligent Computing CHIP magazine (India) =

Defunct technology magazine

- Categories: Computer magazines
- Frequency: Monthly
- First issue: March 1998
- Final issue: August 2013
- Company: Infomedia 18
- Country: India
- Language: English
- Website: Official website

Intelligent Computing CHIP (IC CHIP) was a monthly Information Technology magazine published by Network 18 Publishing Ltd (formerly Infomedia 18 Ltd.) since December 2003. It was the Indian edition of the German monthly CHIP, which is a registered trademark of Vogel Burda Holding Inc. It was shut down in September 2013.

Jamshed Avari served as the Deputy Editor-in-chief of the magazine from January 2010 to June 2013. Sharon Khare served as Deputy Editor from July 2013 to September 2013.

== About ==
IC Chip was launched in India in March 1998. It was earlier published in India by Exicom India Ltd from Jasubhai Digital Media under a licensing agreement with Vogel-Veriag of Germany. It touched a circulation of 120,000. However, financial issues led to Jasubhai parting ways with Vogel, and launching their own magazine called Digit.

Later, the magazine was licensed to Infomedia 18. IC CHIP carried a free, dual layer DVD and a supplement called CHIP Insider every month. The DVD contained software, game demos, Linux Distros and tools, and CHIP archives. It also carried a few videos such as Tech Toyz videos and game trailers. Another supplement, CHIP Plus, was discontinued before the magazine shut down, was meant for beginners. It contained guides and tutorials on various IT-related topics.

On 22 October 2013, Chip subscribers received an e-mail regarding the discontinuation of IC CHIP.

== Download CHIP Asia ==
Download CHIP Asia was a community introduced in 2008. Download CHIP Asia, which was discontinued in 2012, enabled users of the CHIP website to download software, write reviews, and recommend software to be featured.
