= Game-Art-HQ =

Website

Game-Art-HQ.com
- Website type: Gaming / Art
- Owner: Privately Owned
- Creator: Reinhold Hoffmann
- Revenue: Not-for-Profit
- Website: http://www.game-art-hq.com/
- Commercial: Yes
- Registration: Free
- Launched: June 21, 2011; 15 years ago
- Current status: Active

Game-Art-HQ is a website that provides game related artworks which were released by game developers as well as detailed fan art and sometimes cosplay photos. Unique to this website are art projects and tributes organized about video games. These have been featured on many web portals like chip.de Eventhubs and Shoryuken. One of them, the Street Fighter Anniversary Art Tribute, was organized in cooperation with Capcom While fan art is mostly used for drawn art, Game Art HQ also considers cosplay, sculptures and crafts as artworks relevant for the site. Additionally, there are interviews with game producers, artists and cosplay models done from time to time. The website aims to promote art by video game companies as well as helping independent artists to get more exposure. While there are many communities supporting and showing fan art, there are strong guidelines and quality standards on Game Art HQ. Another difference with portals which show fan art to generate revenue is that Game Art HQ is publishing the artworks only with the clear permission by the creator(s).

== History ==
In June 2011, the German site founder Reinhold Hoffmann registered the Game-Art-HQ domain and started the website on 21 June as a blog about artworks related to video games. This concept was the base for later ideas like galleries for now over 1500 different games and game characters. The first community project on Game Art HQ was a little tribute to Battle Arena Toshinden and its characters. Fourteen artists participated in this fan art tribute. Following were art contests and growing art tribute projects like the Street Fighter 25th Anniversary Tribute with over 200 artists in cooperation with Capcom. They celebrated the 20th Anniversary of the Doom games on the 10th of December 2013 with an art tribute which was featured on multiple websites like Kotaku or Eurogamer. In 2014, they celebrated the 20th Anniversary of the Sony PlayStation by illustrating 45 games through fan art.

== Today ==
Today, the website is featuring over 1500 professional artists who show their game-related art. Their video game art tributes like "Link's Blacklist" are promoted on multiple mainstream game portals like kotaku, IGN as well as magazines like Chip.de.

== Art Contests ==
Art Contests on Game Art HQ are held annually and usually last for 30–90 days. They are often about using specific tools to draw or a specific style to draw like traditional tools or the "Chibi Art" contests. Winners are determined through the votes by ten members of the community, and prizes are usually funded through the ad revenue on the website.

== Community ==
Currently (October 2017) around 8000 artists form the community of Game Art HQ. Community-driven projects are mostly organised via the group of the website on DeviantArt.
