= USS Chipper =

USS Chipper has been the name of more than one United States Navy ship, and may refer to:

- USS Chipper (SP-256), later USS SP-256, a patrol vessel in commission from 1917 to 1918
- USS Chipper (SP-1049), a patrol vessel and ferryboat in commission from 1917 to 1919
