= Chiper =

Chiper is a surname. Notable people with the surname include:

- Claudia Chiper (born 1995), Moldovan footballer
- Gheorghe Chiper (born 1978), Romanian figure skater

== See also ==
- Chipper (surname)
