= AB Nyköpings Automobilfabrik =

Swedish automobile manufacturer

Saab-ANA
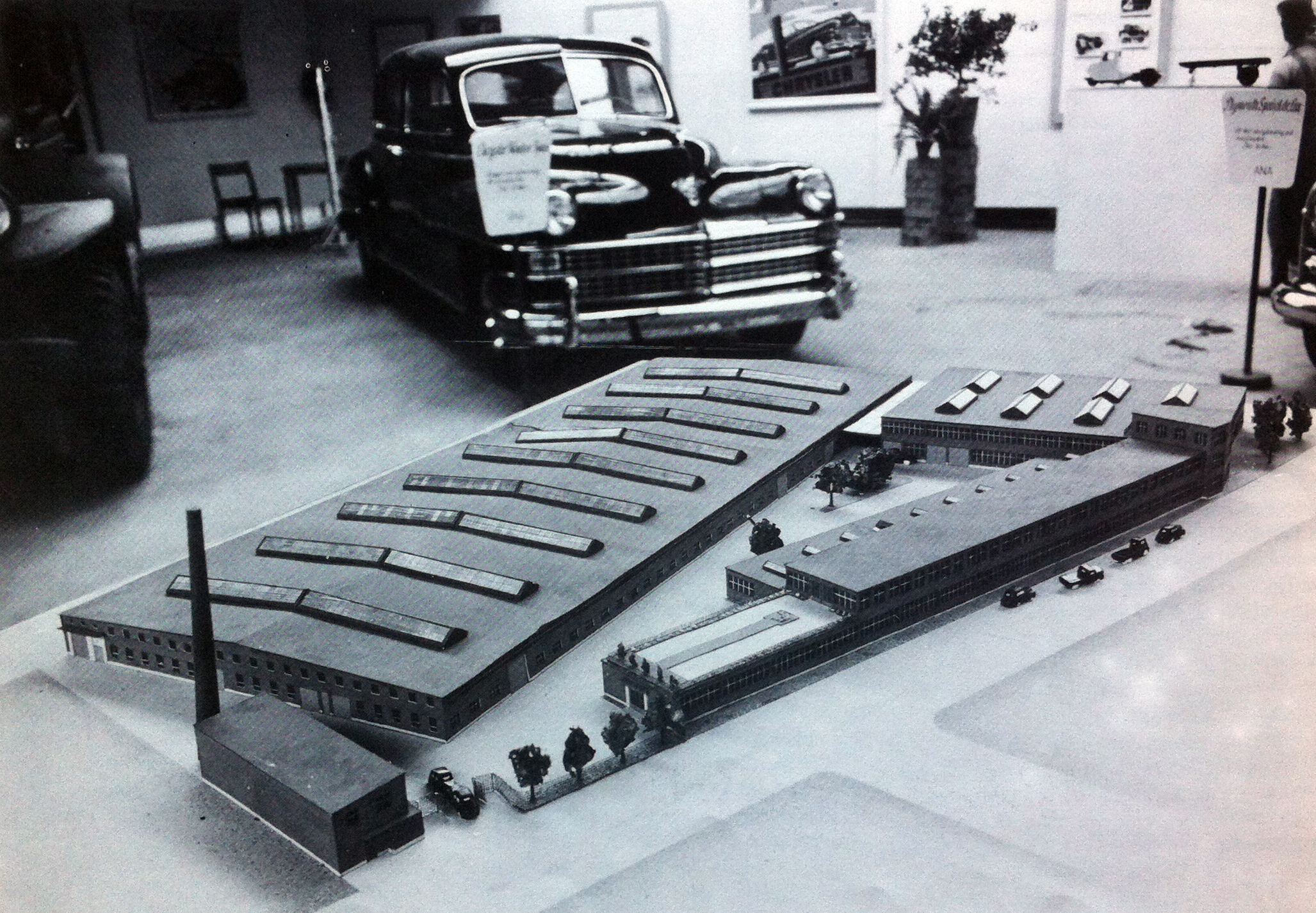
- Model of the ANA factory 1948
- Formerly: AB Nyköpings Automobilfabrik (1937–1960); SAAB-ANA (1960–1965)
- Industry: Automobile manufacturing, import and sales; Aircraft sales; Motorcycle sales; Farm equipment sales
- Founded: 1937; 89 years ago
- Headquarters: Nyköping, Sweden
- Parent: Nordiska Kompaniet (1937–1960); SAAB (from 1960)
- Subsidiaries: AB Farming

AB Nyköpings Automobilfabrik (ANA), founded in 1937, was an automobile manufacturer in Nyköping, Sweden.

== History ==
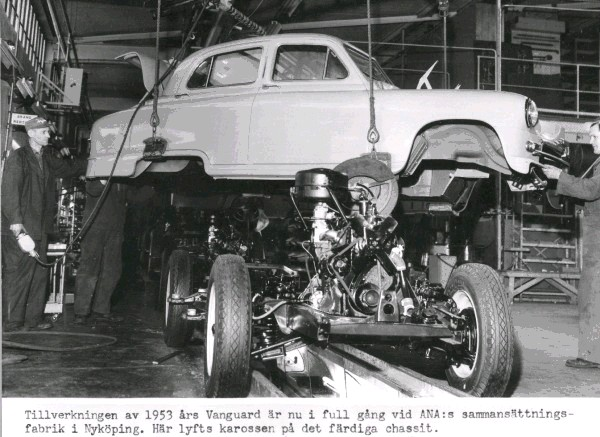
Assembly of Standard Vanguard in 1953

It assembled trucks for Chrysler, DeSoto, Plymouth, Fargo and later Škoda and Standard and from the mid-1950s Simca. From 1946, they sold Piper aircraft. The company was founded as a subsidiary of Nordiska Kompaniet.

During the 1960s, the company distributed Massey Ferguson tractors, developing a modified version of the Ferguson hitch called the Swedish Hitch.

In 1960, the company was bought by Saab and renamed Saab-ANA and transformed into a SAAB dealership. In 2013, ANA started selling BMW and Mini and in some years they made police versions of BMW cars and motorcycles. Some production re-emerged when NEVS bought the bankruptcy estate and in 2016, NEVS ended the Saab brand name. Hedin Bil bought ANA Motorcentrum AB on July 2, 2017, and car sales and workshop services continued under the name Trollhättan AB and Hedin bil in Lysekil.
