= Oxbacken =

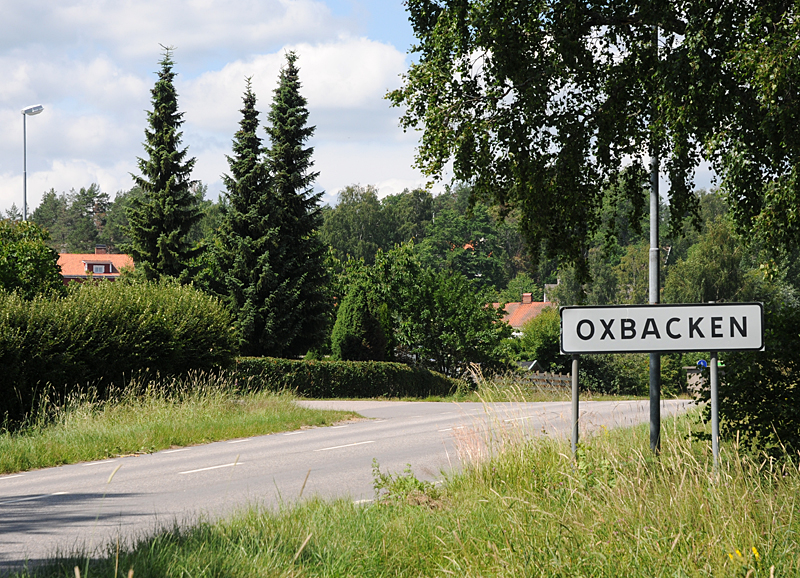

- Location within Södermanland Location within Sweden
- Coordinates: 58°47′N 17°00′E
- Country: Sweden
- Province: Södermanland
- County: Södermanland County
- Municipality: Nyköping Municipality

Area
  - Total: 0.18 km^{2} (0.069 sq mi)

Population (2005-12-31)
  - Total: 220
  - Density: 1,229/km^{2} (3,180/sq mi)
- Time zone: UTC+1 (CET)
  - Summer (DST): UTC+2 (CEST)

Oxbacken is a former locality situated in Nyköping Municipality, Södermanland County, Sweden with 220 inhabitants in 2005. Since 2010 it is included statistically in Nyköping urban area.
