= Chipper (surname) =

Chipper is a surname. Notable people with the surname include:

- Eric Chipper (1915–1996), Canadian football player
- John Chipper (1910–1980), British politician

== See also ==
- Chipper (disambiguation)
- Chiper, another surname
