= Plant propagation =

Process by which new plants grow

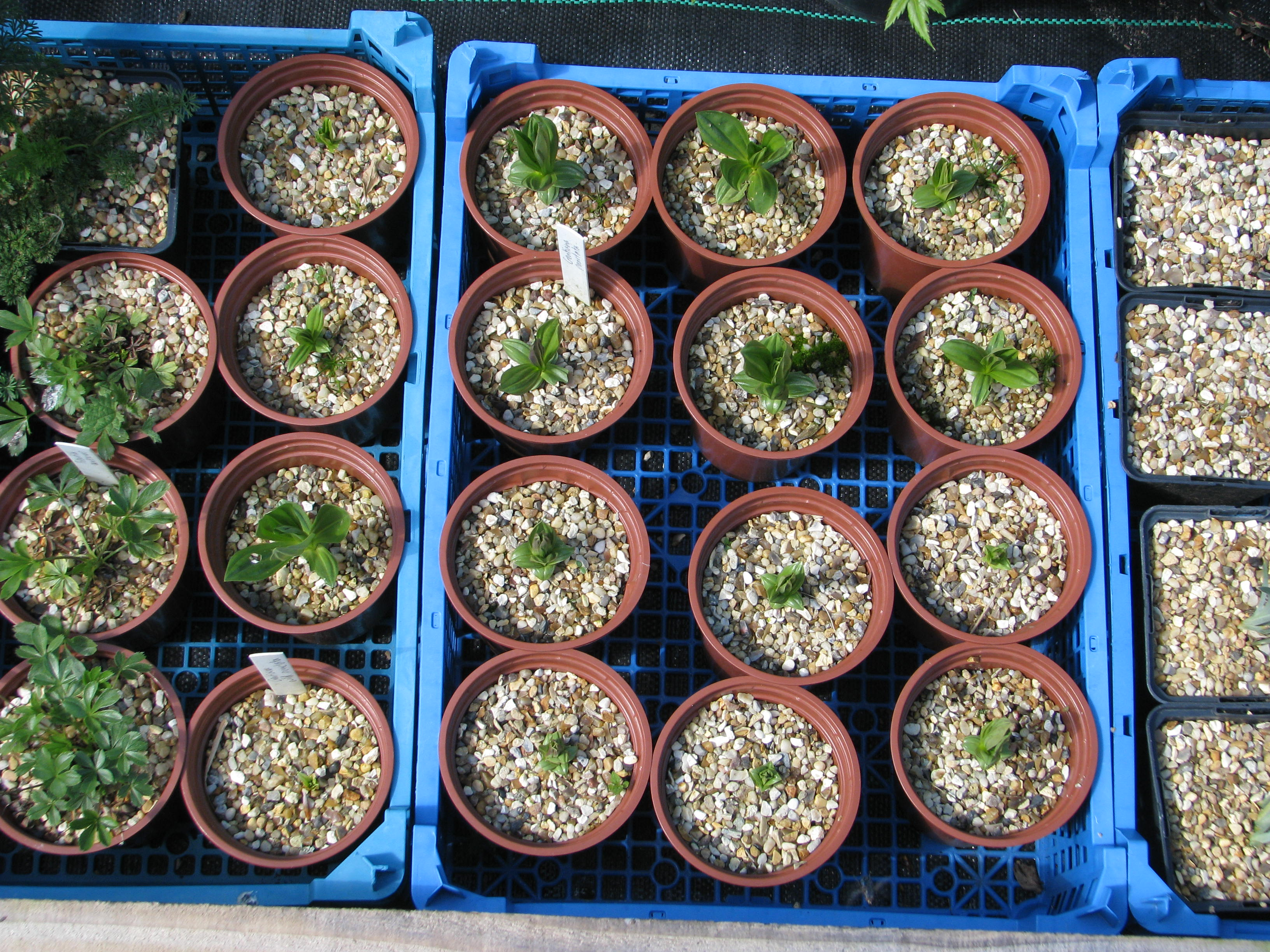
Gentian seedlings in a plant nursery

Plant propagation is the process by which new plants grow from various sources, including seeds, cuttings, and other plant parts. Plant propagation can refer to both man-made and natural processes.

Propagation typically occurs as a step in the overall cycle of plant growth. For seeds, it happens after ripening and dispersal; for vegetative parts, it happens after detachment or pruning; for asexually-reproducing plants, such as strawberry, it happens as the new plant develops from existing parts.

Countless plants are propagated each day in horticulture and agriculture.

Plant propagation is vital to agriculture and horticulture, not just for human food production but also for forest and fibre crops, as well as traditional and herbal medicine. It is also important for plant breeding.

== Etymology ==
The term "propagation" comes from the Old French propagacion "offshoot, offspring" (13c.) and directly from Latin propagationem (nominative propagatio) "a propagation, extension, enlargement,". this now means "the act of producing a new plant from a parent plant."

== Sexual propagation ==
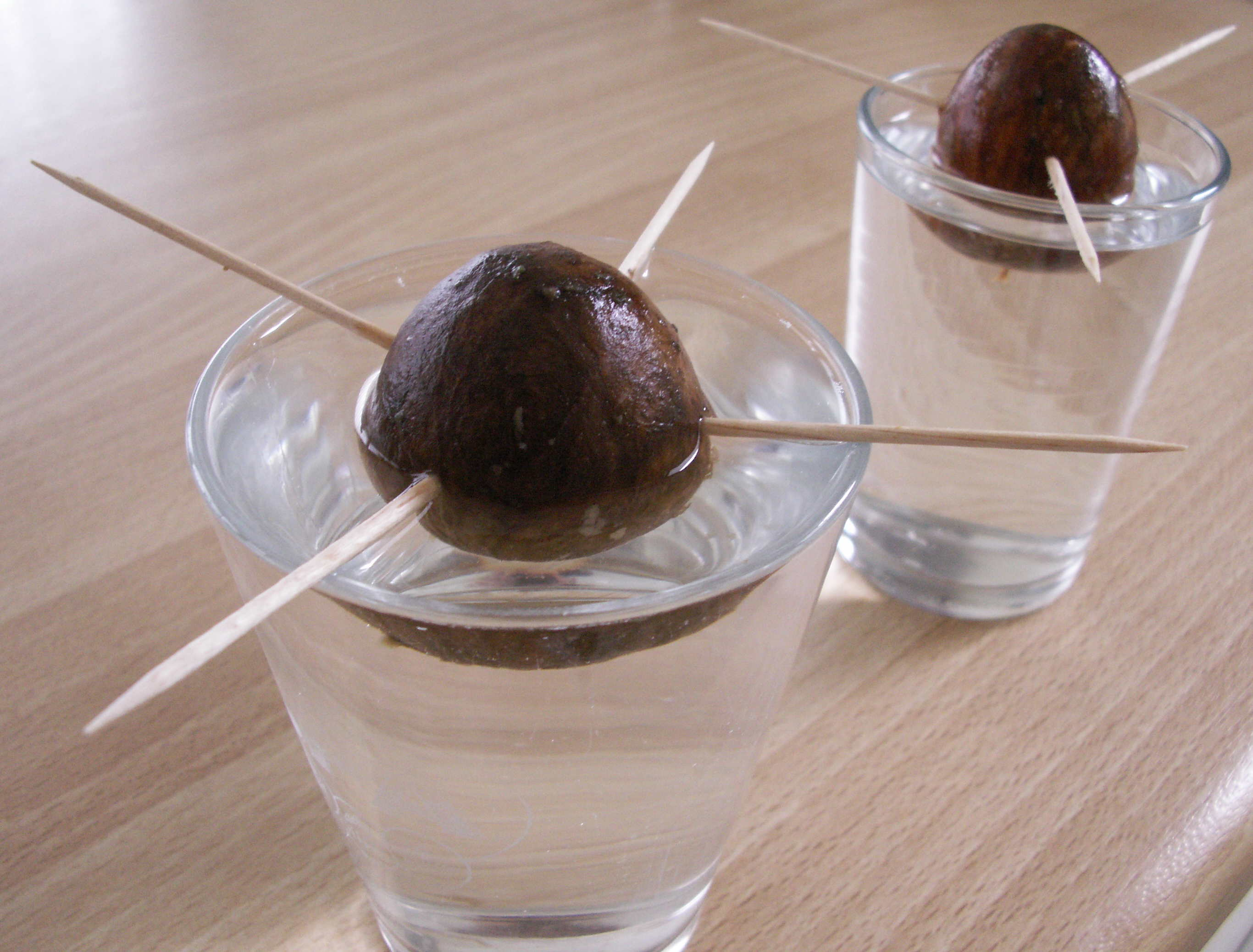
One way to germinate an avocado seed

Seeds and spores can be used for reproduction (e.g. sowing). Seeds are typically produced from sexual reproduction within a species because genetic recombination has occurred. A plant grown from seeds may have different characteristics from its parents. Some species produce seeds that require special conditions to germinate, such as cold treatment. The seeds of many Australian plants and plants from southern Africa and the American west require smoke or fire to germinate. Some plant species, including many trees, do not produce seeds until they reach maturity, which may take many years. Seeds can be difficult to acquire, and some plants do not produce seed at all. Some plants (like certain plants modified using genetic use restriction technology) may produce seed, but not a fertile seed. In certain cases, this is done to prevent the accidental spreading of these plants, for example by birds and other animals.

== Asexual propagation ==
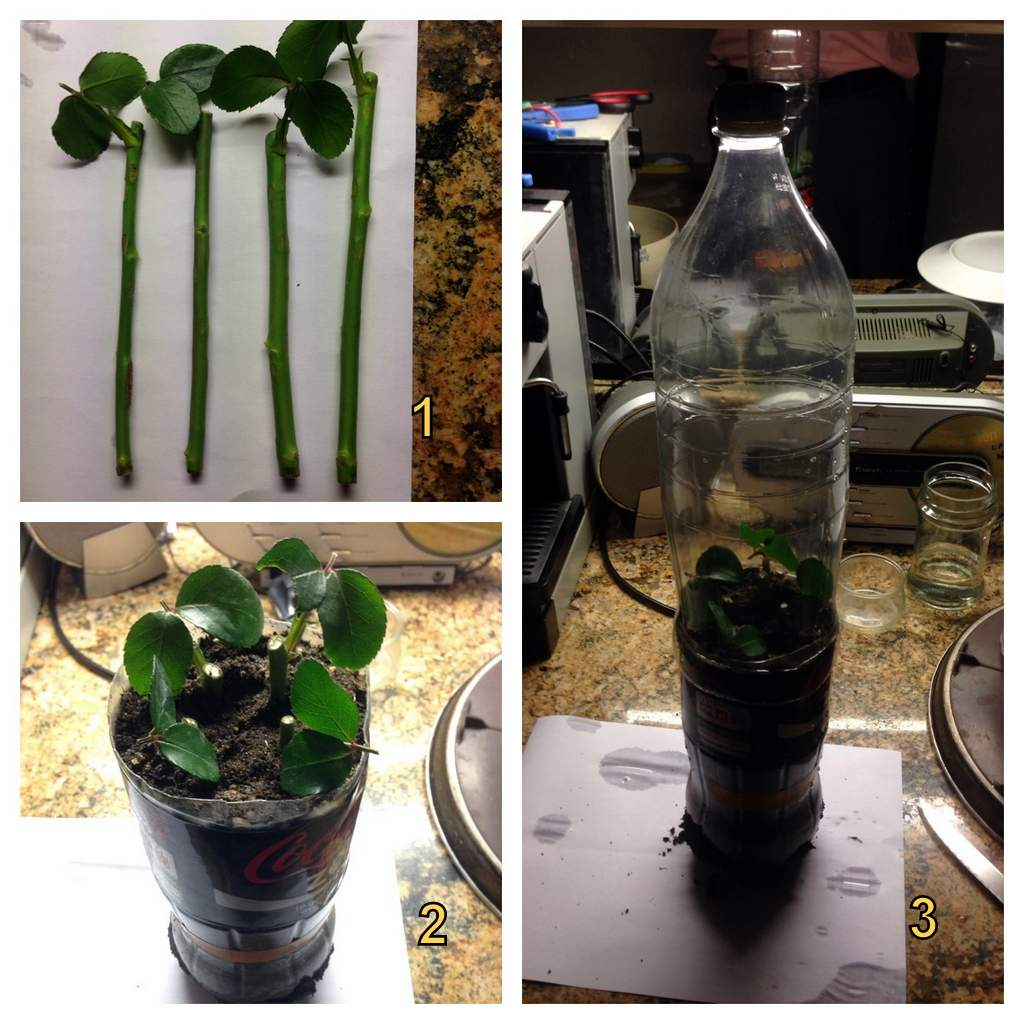
Rose cuttings under plastic bottle greenhouse

Plant roots, stems, and leaves have a number of mechanisms for asexual or vegetative reproduction, which horticulturists employ to multiply or clone plants rapidly, such as in tissue culture and grafting. Plants are produced using material from a single parent and as such, there is no exchange of genetic material, therefore vegetative propagation methods almost always produce plants that are identical to the parent.

In some plants, seeds can be produced without fertilization and the seeds contain only the genetic material of the parent plant. Therefore, propagation via asexual seeds or apomixis is asexual reproduction but not vegetative propagation.

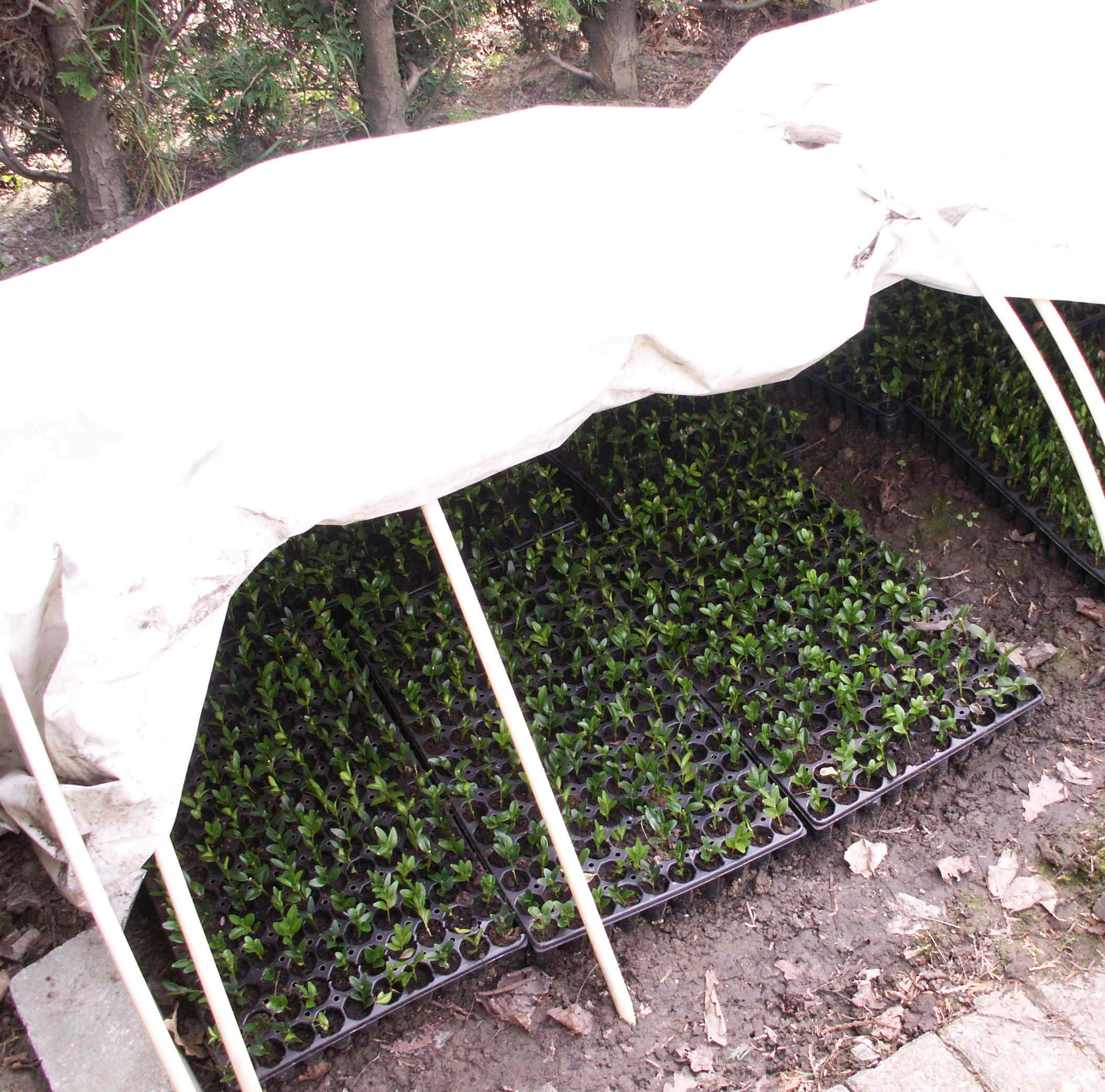
Softwood stem cuttings rooting in a controlled environment

Techniques for vegetative propagation include:

- Air or ground layering
- Division
- Grafting and bud grafting, widely used in fruit tree propagation
- Micropropagation
- Offsets
- Stolons (runners)
- Storage organs such as bulbs, corms, tubers, and rhizomes
- Striking or cuttings
- Twin-scaling

== Heated propagator ==
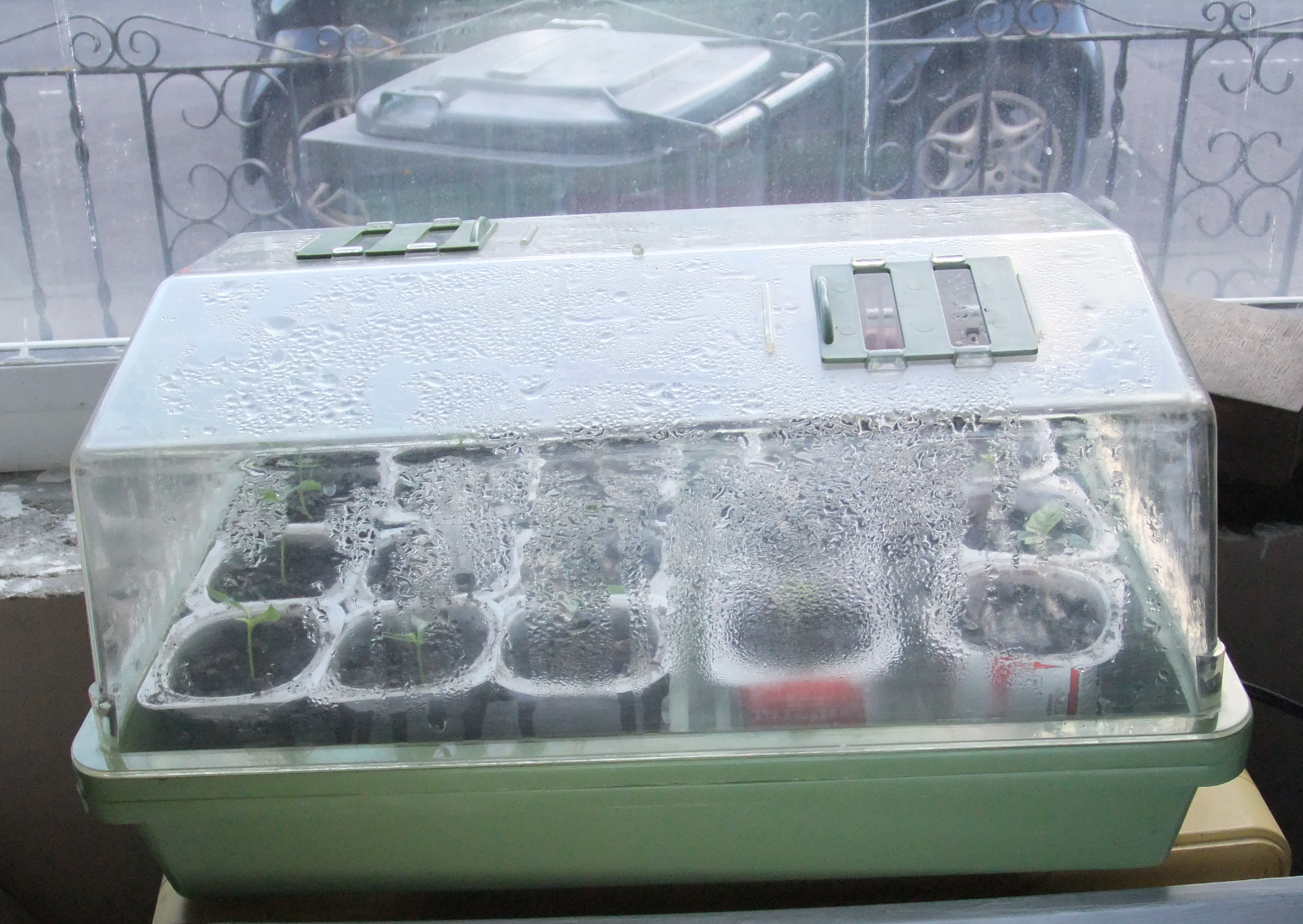
Electric propagator, filled with pepper plant seedlings, in front of a house window.

A heated propagator is a horticultural device to maintain a warm and damp environment for seeds and cuttings to grow in. They generally provide bottom heat (maintained at a particular temperature) and high humidity, which is essential in successful seed germination and in helping cuttings to take root. In colder climates they are sometimes used for plants like peppers and sweet peas which need warmer environments (about 15°C, for the plants listed) in order to germinate. If excessive condensation forms on the inside of the lid, the gardener can open the ventilating holes to regulate the temperature a little.

Non-electric propagators (mainly a seed tray and a clear plastic lid) are a lot cheaper to purchase than a heated propagator, but without the constant regulated warmth and bottom heat provided by a heated propagator, growth of seedlings tends to be slower and less consistent (with increased risk of seeds failing to germinate).

== Seed propagation mat ==
An electric seed-propagation mat is a heated rubber mat covered by a metal cage that is used in gardening. The mats are made so that planters containing seedlings can be placed on top of the metal cage without the risk of starting a fire. Another example is a seedling heat mat, multiple layers of durable, water resistant plastic material with insulated heating coils embedded inside (similar to underfloor heating systems, but with rubber mat instead of flooring). In extreme cold, gardeners place a loose plastic cover over the planters/mats which creates a sort of miniature greenhouse. The constant and predictable heat allows people to raise seedlings in the winter months when the weather is generally too cold for seedlings to survive naturally outside. When combined with a lighting system, many plants can be grown indoors using these mats. This can increase the variety of plants that a gardener can use.

== See also ==
- Adventitious
- Clonal colony
- Fruit tree propagation
- Orthodox seed
- Recalcitrant seed
- Selection methods in plant breeding based on mode of reproduction
- Propagation of grapevines
- Weeping willow (tree) is an ornamental tree (Salix babylonica and related hybrids
- Propagation of Christmas trees
- Hemerochory
- Escaped plant

== Bibliography ==
- Charles W. Heuser (1997). The Complete Book of Plant Propagation. Taunton Press. ISBN 1561582344.
