= Common Hybrid Interface Protocol System =

Common Hybrid Interface Protocol System (CHIPS) is the definition of a computer network that consists of a mixture of common serial data protocols such as RS-232 and RS-485, or can be even PC keyboard interface communication. CHIPS may also consist of Bluetooth and Wi-Fi for wireless communication can be installed on all major hardware platforms.

There are several CHIPS projects and products available today where such systems are i.e. MISOLIMA DOLLx8 and Olivetti's "Mael Gateasy". As new bus systems are gaining market shares, there will always be needs for CHIPS to enable serial network protocols to be integrated into one single connection point. By using CHIPS, it will be possible to control I/O data from different sources and systems without having the need to install several serial interface cards and drivers.

CHIPS users will, in most cases, be able to work with several serial data transceiver sources at the same time. Such serial data might originate from PC Keyboards, CANbus, RS and wireless communication where all data connects into one or several CHIPS units that communicate over the mixed serial data protocols.

Due to some mixed baud rates between the connected systems, the compatibility with CHIPS means that some devices will have reduced transfer rates, but CHIPS are primary designed for Lab-, office-, home-, factory- and building automation also used in Internet of Things.
