= USS Chipper (SP-256) =

Patrol vessel of the United States Navy

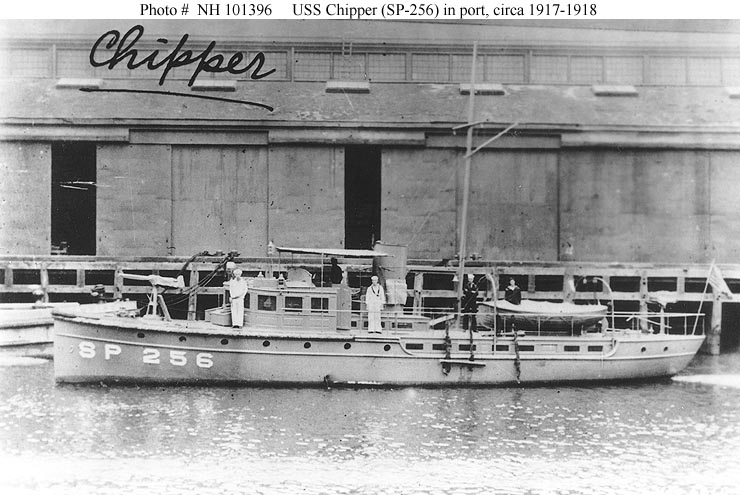
- USS Chipper, later USS SP-256, during World War I.

History

United States
- Name: USS Chipper (1917–1918); USS SP-256 (1918)
- Namesake: Chipper was her previous name retained; SP-256 was her section patrol number
- Builder: New York Yacht, Launch and Engine Company, Morris Heights, the Bronx, New York
- Completed: 1913
- Acquired: 15 June 1917
- Commissioned: late July 1917
- Renamed: USS SP-256 April 1918
- Fate: Returned to owner 4 December 1918
- Notes: Operated as civilian motorboat Chipper 1913-1917 and from December 1918

General characteristics
- Type: Patrol vessel
- Length: 69 ft (21 m)

The first USS Chipper (SP-256), later USS SP-256, was a United States Navy patrol vessel in commission from 1917 to 1918.

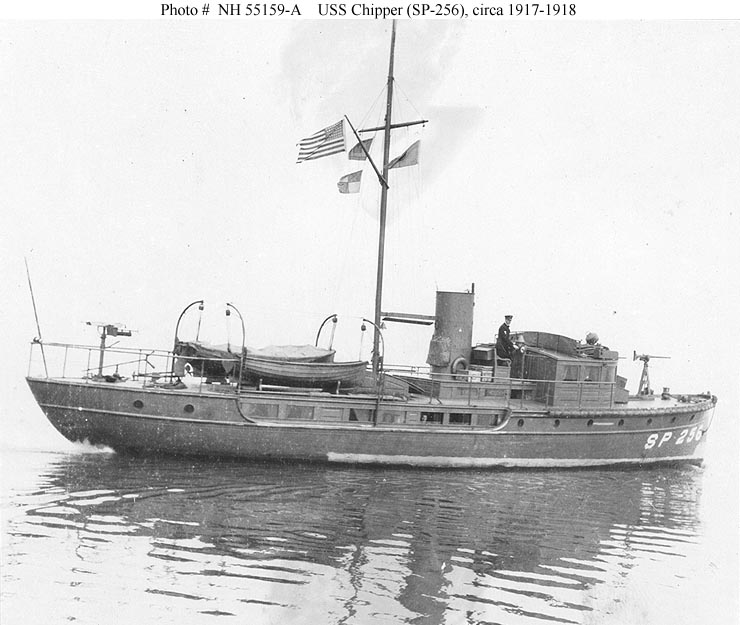
USS Chipper, later USS SP-256, during World War I.

Chipper was built as a civilian motorboat of the same name in 1913 by the New York Yacht, Launch and Engine Company at Morris Heights in the Bronx, New York. The U.S. Navy leased her on 15 June 1917 from her owner, C. Wetherill of Erika, Virginia, for World War I service as a patrol vessel. She was commissioned about six weeks later, in late July 1917, as USS Chipper (SP-256).

Chipper spent the rest of World War I on section patrol duty along the United States East Coast. She was renamed USS SP-256 in April 1918.

SP-256 was returned to Wetherill on 4 December 1918.

Chipper should not be confused with another patrol vessel and ferryboat, USS Chipper (SP-1049), which also was in commission in the U.S. Navy during World War I.
