= Tech Toyz =

TV show

- Country of origin: India

Production
- Executive producer: Megha Vishwanath
- Running time: 21 minutes

Original release
- Network: CNBC TV18

Tech Toyz is a weekly round-up of everything in the world of technology and information that airs on CNBC-TV18. It covers product launches and provides reviews and comparisons between products available in the market. The show is anchored by Megha Vishawnath.

== Online ==
Shows of the current season of Tech Toyz are available as complete episodes on the TV18 official website and on the popular video-sharing site YouTube.

== Anchors ==
Suresh Venkat is Executive Producer with CNBC TV18. Prior to this, he was Programming Head with Radio City in Bangalore and anchored a Saturday program Brunch with the Boss.
