= USS Chipper (SP-1049) =

Patrol vessel of the United States Navy

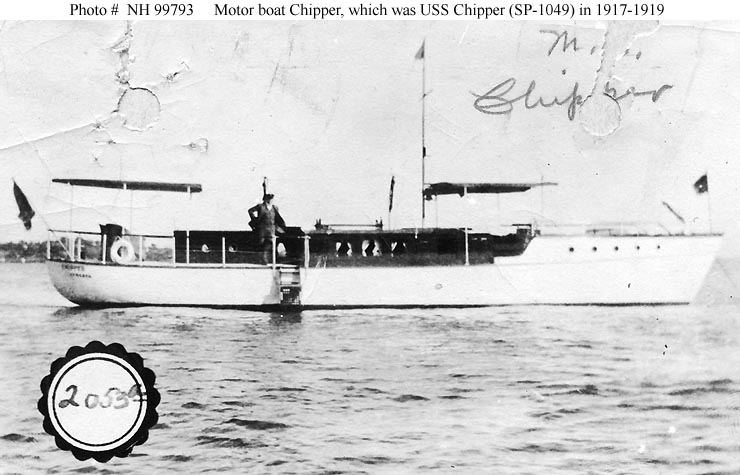
- Chipper as a civilian motorboat sometime between 1909 and 1917, prior to her U.S. Navy service.

History

United States
- Name: USS Chipper
- Namesake: Previous name retained
- Completed: 1909
- Acquired: 21 July 1917
- Commissioned: 24 July 1917
- Fate: Returned to owner 24 March 1919
- Notes: Operated as civilian motorboat Chipper 1909-1917 and from 1919

General characteristics
- Type: Patrol vessel and ferryboat
- Length: 56 ft (17 m)

The second USS Chipper (SP-1049), was a United States Navy patrol vessel and ferryboat in commission from 1917 to 1919.

Chipper was built as a civilian motorboat of the same name in 1909 at Morris Heights in the Bronx, New York. The U.S. Navy leased her on 21 July 1917 for World War I service as a patrol vessel. She was commissioned as USS Chipper (SP-1049) on 24 July 1917.

Attached to the 4th Naval District, Chipper initially performed section patrol duty at Philadelphia, Pennsylvania, then was employed on ferry duties at the United States Naval Academy in Annapolis, Maryland. In March 1918 she was transferred to the 5th Naval District, and in August 1918 was reported to be serving at Naval Air Station Anacostia in Washington, D.C.

Chipper was returned to her owner on 24 March 1919.

Chipper should not be confused with another patrol vessel, USS Chipper (SP-256), later USS SP-256, which also was in commission in the U.S. Navy during World War I.
