= Chips (literary magazine) =

Magazine published by Bethesda-Chevy Chase High School

Chips is Bethesda-Chevy Chase High School's literary magazine. The magazine was started in 1937 and is published annually.

== Awards ==
Chips has, throughout its existence, received many awards, notably from the Columbia Scholastic Press Association (CSPA) and the National Council of Teachers of English (NCTE).

- CSPA, High School Silver Magazine Crown
- Maryland District of Columbia Scholastic Press Association Gold Rating: 2009-2011
- National Council of Teachers of English Highest Award: 2001, 2002, 2005, 2009-2011
- Journalism Education Association Best of Show Award: 2001

== Staff ==
- Editor in chief: Rebeca Ventura
- Writing editor: Matthew Carr
- Art editors: Mia Garret and Luna Nash
- Promotions editor: Josefina Eggleton
- Layout editor: Gigi Lopez
- Faculty sponsor: Dawn Charles
