= Twin-scaling =

Method of plant propagation

Twin-scaling is a vegetative propagation technique first developed in Hippeastrum, in which bulbs with a basal plate are divided into scale sections that include tissue capable of forming adventitious bulblets; the method has since been applied to other bulbous monocots with similar regenerative capacity.

== Purpose ==
Twin-scaling is practiced by professional growers and skilled amateurs to increase bulbs that would naturally propagate very slowly, or to speed up the production of desirable cultivars. Using twin-scaling, it is possible to multiply one bulb into 16 to 32 (or more) viable bulbs in a couple of years, whereas natural propagation might only lead to a doubling every two years or so. It is one of a number of propagation techniques (such as "scooping", "scoring" and "chipping") based on the fact that an accidentally damaged bulb will often regenerate by forming small bulblets or bulbils on the damaged surface. Commercial growers have obtained as many as 100 twin-scales from a single bulb.

== Method ==
The dormant bulb which is to be twin-scaled has its surface sterilized by removing its dry tunic and carefully trimming off its roots and any dead tissue, while leaving a layer of sound basal plate intact, then dipping the clean bulb in dilute bleach (or another suitable disinfectant). The bulb is then sliced cleanly from top to bottom several times, creating 8 or 16 segments, depending on the size of the bulb. At this stage, the segments are called "chips" (many growers are content with simply chipping a bulb into 4 or 8 and do not divide the bulb further).

True twin-scaling involves further subdivision of the chips to create pairs of scales, joined by a small part of the basal plate. The twin-scales are then treated with fungicide before being mixed with moist, sterile Vermiculite, sealed in plastic bags and left in a fairly warm, dark location until new bulblets form. Some species may require alternate periods of warm and cool storage to initiate bulblet growth.

The tiny bulbs are planted into pots or trays of compost and allowed to grow on for a year or more, until they are large enough to survive in individual pots or the open ground. They usually take several years to reach flowering size, although some bulblets of Galanthus have been known to flower in their first year.
