= Chippenham (disambiguation) =

Chippenham is a town in Wiltshire, England.

Chippenham may also refer to:

- Chippenham (UK Parliament constituency), a UK parliamentary constituency covering the North Wiltshire area
- Chippenham, Cambridgeshire, a village and civil parish in England
- Chippenham Parkway or State Route 150, Virginia, United States

== See also ==
- Cippenham, Berkshire, England
