= Chip (magazine) =

German computer and communications magazine

- Cover of CHIP Plus (German edition), September 2024
- Editor: Manuel Schreiber
- Categories: Computer magazines
- Frequency: Monthly
- Circulation: 420,000 / month
- Publisher: CHIP Communications
- First issue: September 1978; 47 years ago
- Company: CHIP Holding
- Country: Germany
- Based in: Munich
- Language: German
- Website: www.CHIP.de
- ISSN: 0170-6632

Chip is a computer and communications magazine published by CHIP Holding (formerly Vogel Burda Holding GmbH) in several countries of Europe and Asia. The German edition of CHIP was launched in September 1978 and is one of Germany's oldest and largest computer magazines with 418,019 copies sold in average each month of the 4th quarter 2008.

Competitors in its German home market include Computer Bild, PC-Welt and c't.

== CHIP Online ==
CHIP Online is the independent web portal of the CHIP brand. It is one of the most-visited media portals in the German language area, providing hardware and software tests and price comparisons, as well as a large downloading and a community portal. As of March 2019, it is a top 30 site in Germany according to Alexa traffic rankings. CHIP Online is operated by CHIP Digital GmbH.

== Magazine ==
Currently there are these German different magazines available:

- CHIP Plus
- CHIP Foto Video mit DVD
- CHIP Test & Kauf
- CHIP Linux

From 1998 to 2013, an Indian edition titled Intelligent Computing CHIP was published.
