= Chipper (drugs) =

Recreational drug user

A chipper is an occasional recreational-drug user who does not use drugs with the regularity or frequency that is typical of addiction. It is used particularly to refer to occasional users of opiates and tobacco smokers.

It can also refer to people who use various recreational drugs, but none habitually.

== "Social" smokers ==
Such occasional users of tobacco are sometimes thought of as social smokers which is similar in meaning to social drinkers. However, evidence indicates that this only characterizes a minority of chippers. The prevalence of non-daily smoking in the U.S. has increased by 40% between 1996 and 2001.

== Tipping point ==
Chippers are given as an example in The Tipping Point; if chippers begin smoking above a certain threshold (or tipping point), then they will develop regular cravings and become addicted.

== History ==
The term dates at least to the 1970s, where it is used in reference to opiate use.

The term was notably used in reference to tobacco by psychologist Dr. Saul Shiffman, a professor at the University of Pittsburgh.

== See also ==
- Cigarette smoking among college students#Social smokers
