= CHIP Holding =

German-based publishing house

CHIP Holding GmbH is a German-based publishing house owned by Hubert Burda Media. Its core activity is the publication of special-interest, country, and language-specific print and online media in the information and communication technology sector. 15 countries with over 50 publications (including CHIP magazine as well as other computer game magazines and business-to-business journals) are covered throughout Europe and Asia. CHIP Communications GmbH (formerly Vogel Burda Communications) is a 100 percent subsidiary of CHIP Holding.

== History ==
=== 2000 ===
The Vogel Burda Group founded as a joint venture media company in September, 2000 by two of Germany's leading publishers, the Vogel Media Group and Hubert Burda Media. Under the joint holding company, CHIP-Holding GmbH (later known as Vogel Burda Holding GmbH, Munich, Germany) in which both parties have a 50% share, there was a company for print media, Vogel Burda Communication GmbH. Here Vogel is responsible for publishing management from formerly Vogel Computer Press Munich. Burda appointed a director of finance (CFO). Within the joint company all Vogel Computer Press' print media to-date, as well as the Vogel Media Group's international computer publishing companies in the Czech Republic, Poland, Hungary, Romania, Italy, Turkey, China, Malaysia and Singapore are combined, including co-operations with the license partners in India, Indonesia, Ukraine and Greece.

CHIP Online GmbH — also a component of the new alliance — converted into a stock-exchange-listed company. CHIP Online developed into the leading German-language computer portal with extension to a widely recognised e-commerce platform. In 2002 CHIP Xonio Online GmbH was created from the merger of CHIP Online International and Xonio GmbH. As of 2002, the company operates and markets the Chip Online computer portal (www.chip.de), Download.de download portal (www.download.de, later merged with CHIP Online) and the Xonio mobile communications portal (www.xonio.com).

All Vogel Computer Media's employees are being transferred to the new joint company.

=== 2008 ===
On October 8, 2007 Hubert Burda Media announced the acquisition of remaining parts of CHIP and CHIP Xonio from the Vogel Medien company. Two month later it was announced about reorganization of Vogel Burda Holding with a changing the management structure. On 1 January 2008 Vogel Burda Holding renamed to CHIP Holding. The holding itself divides into CHIP Communications GmbH (formerly Vogel Burda Communications) and CHIP XONIO Online GmbH.

The current CHIP Communications portfolio comprises renowned and successful mediums such as CHIP, CHIP FOTO-VIDEO digital and CHIP Test & Kauf. This also includes websites, line extensions, books, specials and DVDs. Through the website ZEHN.DE the publishing house has expanded its editorial spectrum.

The CHIP Xonio Online operates and markets the computer portal CHIP Online and the mobile portal Xonio (www.xonio.com).

=== 2013 ===
In October 2013 the company name CHIP Xonio Online GmbH was changed to CHIP Digital GmbH as the Xonio brand was already defunct for a while because the Xonio portal had been integrated into CHIP Online back in 2009.
