= Stoorn =

Coordinates: 65°11′54″N 19°36′32″E

Stoorn is a giant wooden elk (moose) planned to be built in northern Norrland in Sweden. The elk, intended as a tourist attraction, will be 45 m (148 ft) high, 47 m (154 ft) long, and will contain three floors of 500 m^{2} each, and one floor of 250 m^{2}. It will hold a restaurant, conference centre and a 350-capacity concert hall. There will be a panorama deck in the antlers. Access to the body of the elk will be through an elevator in a large pine tree the elk will appear to be biting on.

The elk is of such magnitude that while its front legs will be positioned in Arvidsjaur municipality in the county of Norrbotten, the hind legs will be in Skellefteå Municipality in Västerbotten. Because of these circumstances, it took a while for the $9 million project to get approval. In November 2007, it received its go-ahead, and building was planned to start before the end of the year. As of March 2011, nothing has happened. As of 2018, the project is ongoing but still searching for and procuring financing.

The name "Stoorn" means "the big one" in the local dialect.
