= 1994 Swedish general election =

- 18 September 1994

All 349 seats in the Riksdag 175 seats needed for a majority
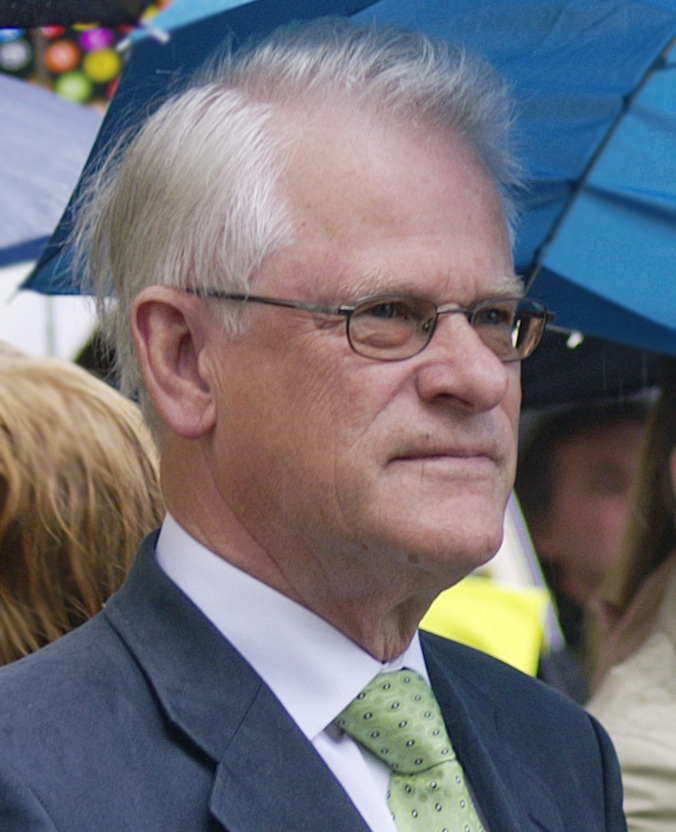

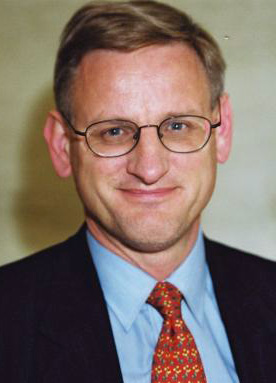

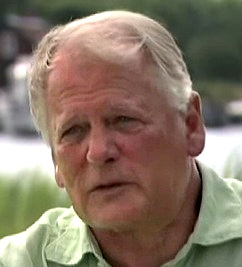

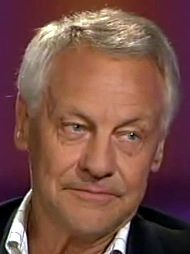

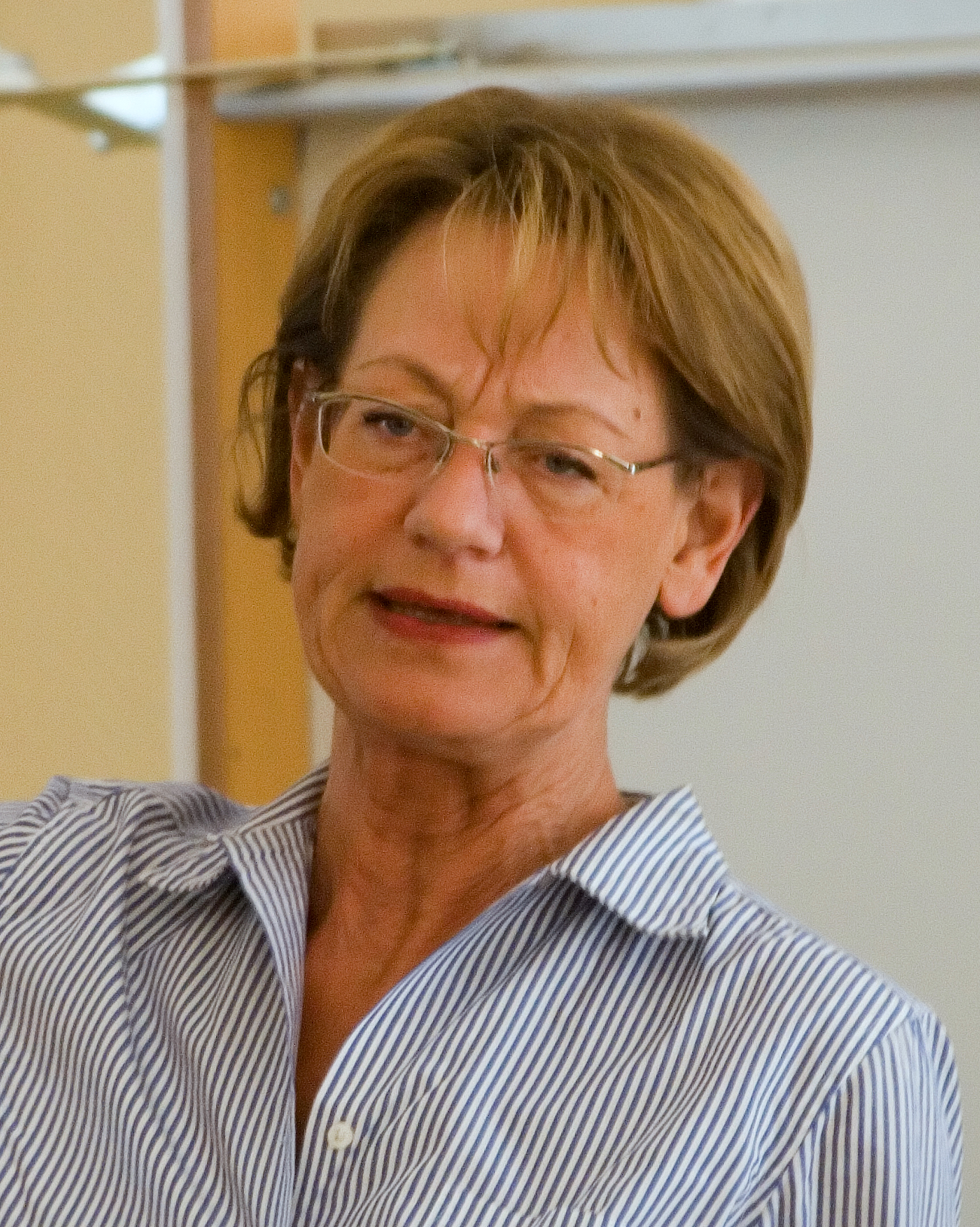

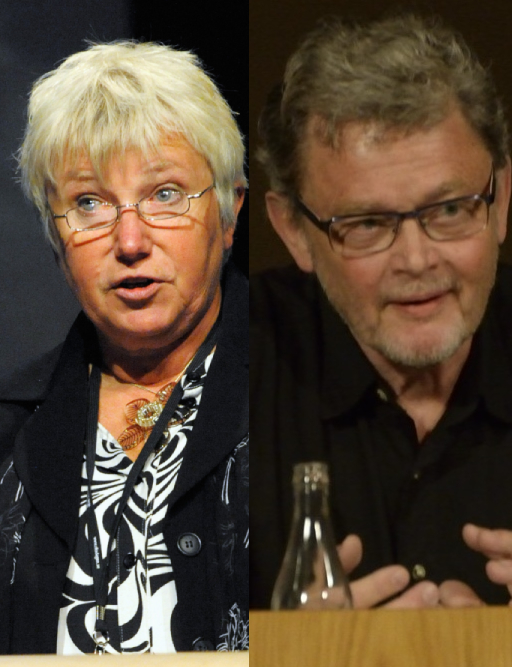

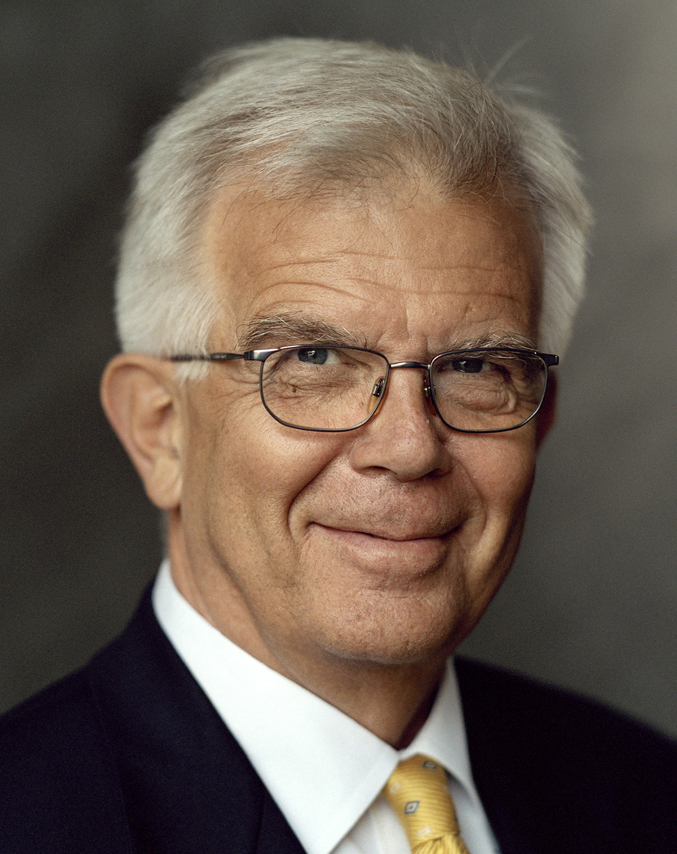
	First party	Second party	Third party
Leader	Ingvar Carlsson	Carl Bildt	Olof Johansson
Party	Social Democrats	Moderate	Centre
Last election	138	80	31
Seats won	161	80	27
Seat change	▲23	Steady	▼4
Popular vote	2,513,905	1,243,253	425,153
Percentage	45.25%	22.38%	7.65%
Swing	▲7.54 pp	▲0.46 pp	▼0.85 pp
	Fourth party	Fifth party	Sixth party
Leader	Bengt Westerberg	Gudrun Schyman	Marianne Samuelsson; Birger Schlaug
Party	Liberal People's	Left	Green
Last election	33	16	0
Seats won	26	22	18
Seat change	▼7	▲6	▲18
Popular vote	399,556	342,988	279,042
Percentage	7.19%	6.17%	5.02%
Swing	▼1.94 pp	▲1.66 pp	▲1.64 pp
	Seventh party
Leader	Alf Svensson
Party	Christian Democrats
Last election	26
Seats won	15
Seat change	▼11
Popular vote	225,974
Percentage	4.07%
Swing	▼3.07 pp
- Map of the election, showing the distribution of constituency and levelling seats, as well as the largest political bloc within each constituency.
PM before election
Carl Bildt
Moderate
Elected PM
Ingvar Carlsson
Social Democrats

General elections were held in Sweden on 18 September 1994. The Swedish Social Democratic Party remained the largest party in the Riksdag, winning 161 of the 349 seats. Led by Ingvar Carlsson, the party returned to power and formed a minority government after the election. This was the final time the Social Democrats recorded above 40% of the vote before the party's vote share steeply declined four years later and never recovered. The Greens also returned to the Riksdag in the 1994 elections, after a three-year absence.

The election saw the largest bloc differences for a generation, with the red-green parties making sizeable inroads into the blue heartlands of inner Småland and Western Götaland, at an even higher rate than 1988. The Social Democrats gathered more than 50% of the vote in all five northern counties, Blekinge, Södermanland, Västmanland and Örebro.

In spite of the loss of power, the Moderates retained their 80 seats and gained 0.5% from 1991. Due to the sizeable losses of their coalition, the net difference between the blocs was 53, with the red-greens making up 201 and the blue parties 148.

The Christian Democrats fared poorly, merely beating the threshold by 3,752 votes. New Democracy, a right-wing populist political party which had entered the Riksdag three years earlier, performed poorly, losing most of its voters and all of its seats in the Riksdag. In total the party's vote share dropped from 6.7% in 1991 to 1.2% in 1994. The election introduced an extended electoral cycle of four years, replacing the previous three-year terms.

The proportion of women elected to the Riksdag increased from 34% in 1991 to 40%, following a campaign by the Stödstrumporna (lit. 'The Support stockings') before the elections.

They were the first elections in the world in which the official results were published live on the nascent internet.

== Debates ==
1994 Swedish general election debates
Date	Time	Organizers	Moderators	P Present I Invitee N Non-invitee								
Date	Time	Organizers	Moderators	S	M	L	C	KD	NyD	V	MP	Refs
Sep 16	20:00	Sveriges Television	Pia Brandelius; Maud Zachrisson	P Ingvar Carlsson	P Carl Bildt	P Bengt Westerber	P Olof Johansson	P Alf Svensson	P Vivianne Franzén	P Gudrun Schyman	P Birger Schlaug	

== Results ==
Party	Votes	%	Seats	+/–
Swedish Social Democratic Party	2,513,905	45.25	161	+23
Moderate Party	1,243,253	22.38	80	0
Centre Party	425,153	7.65	27	–4
Liberal People's Party	399,556	7.19	26	–7
Left Party	342,988	6.17	22	+6
Green Party	279,042	5.02	18	+18
Christian Democratic Society Party	225,974	4.07	15	–11
New Democracy	68,663	1.24	0	–25
Other parties	57,006	1.03	0	0
Total	5,555,540	100.00	349	0
Valid votes	5,555,540	98.50		
Invalid/blank votes	84,853	1.50		
Total votes	5,640,393	100.00		
Registered voters/turnout	6,496,120	86.83		
Source: Nohlen & Stöver

=== Seat distribution ===
Constituency	Total seats	Seats won									
Constituency	Total seats	By party							By coalition		
Constituency	Total seats	S	M	C	F	V	MP	KDS	Left	Right	Others
Älvsborg North	12	5	2	1	1	1	1	1	6	5	1
Älvsborg South	6	3	2	1					3	3	
Blekinge	6	4	2						4	2	
Bohus	13	5	3	1	1	1	1	1	6	6	1
Gävleborg	12	6	2	1	1	1	1		7	4	1
Gothenburg	17	7	4		2	2	1	1	9	7	1
Gotland	2	2							2		
Halland	9	4	3	1	1				4	5	
Jämtland	5	3	1	1					3	2	
Jönköping	14	5	3	1	1	1	1	2	6	7	1
Kalmar	11	5	2	2		1		1	6	5	
Kopparberg	13	6	2	1	1	1	1	1	7	5	1
Kristianstad	12	6	3	1	1			1	6	6	
Kronoberg	6	3	2	1					3	3	
Malmö	8	5	3						5	3	
Malmöhus North	10	5	3	1	1				5	5	
Malmöhus South	12	5	4	1	1		1		5	6	1
Norrbotten	11	8	1	1		1			9	2	
Örebro	13	6	2	1	1	1	1	1	7	5	1
Östergötland	15	7	3	1	1	1	1	1	8	6	1
Skaraborg	12	5	2	1	1	1	1	1	6	5	1
Södermanland	11	5	2	1	1	1	1		6	4	1
Stockholm County	36	14	11	2	3	2	2	2	16	18	2
Stockholm Municipality	26	9	8	1	3	2	2	1	11	13	2
Uppsala	12	5	3	1	1	1	1		6	5	1
Värmland	11	6	2	1	1	1			7	4	
Västerbotten	11	5	1	1	1	1	1	1	6	4	1
Västernorrland	12	6	2	1	1	1	1		7	4	1
Västmanland	11	6	2	1	1	1			7	4	
Total	349	161	80	27	26	22	18	15	183	148	18
Source: Statistics Sweden

=== By municipality ===
Votes by municipality. The municipalities are the color of the party that got the most votes within the coalition that won relative majority.

Cartogram of the map to the left with each municipality rescaled to the number of valid votes cast.

Map showing the voting shifts from the 1991 to the 1994 election. Darker blue indicates a municipality voted more towards the parties that formed the centre-right bloc. Darker red indicates a municipality voted more towards the parties that form the left-wing bloc.

Votes by municipality as a scale from red/Left-wing bloc to blue/Centre-right bloc.

Cartogram of vote with each municipality rescaled in proportion to number of valid votes cast. Deeper blue represents a relative majority for the centre-right coalition, brighter red represents a relative majority for the left-wing coalition.
