= Results of the 1988 Swedish general election =

Sweden held a general election on the 18 September 1988.

== Results ==
Party	Votes	%	Seats			
Party	Votes	%	Con.	Lev.	Tot.	+/–
Swedish Social Democratic Party	2,321,826	43.21	148	8	156	–3
Moderate Party	983,226	18.30	61	5	66	–10
People's Party	655,720	12.20	38	6	44	–7
Centre Party	607,240	11.30	42	0	42	–1
Left Party Communists	314,031	5.84	13	8	21	+2
Green Party	296,935	5.53	8	12	20	+20
Christian Democratic Society Party	158,182	2.94	0	0	0	–1
Other parties	36,559	0.68	0	0	0	0
Total	5,373,719	100.00	310	39	349	0
Valid votes	5,373,719	98.76				
Invalid/blank votes	67,331	1.24				
Total votes	5,441,050	100.00				
Registered voters/turnout	6,330,023	85.96				
Source: Nohlen & Stöver

== Results by region ==
=== Percentage share ===
Location	Turnout	Share	Votes	S	M	FP	C	VPK	MP	KDS	Other	Left	Right
Götaland	86.4	48.3	2,594,763	42.0	19.0	12.0	12.6	4.6	5.7	3.4	0.7	52.3	43.6
Svealand	85.6	37.3	2,006,083	41.2	20.9	13.5	8.8	6.9	5.7	2.2	0.7	53.9	43.2
Norrland	85.4	14.4	772,873	52.2	9.3	9.4	13.4	7.1	4.7	3.3	0.7	64.0	32.1
Total	86.0	100.0	5,373,719	43.2	18.3	12.2	11.3	5.8	5.5	2.9	0.7	54.6	41.8
Source: SCB

=== By votes ===
Location	Turnout	Share	Votes	S	M	FP	C	VPK	MP	KDS	Other	Left	Right
Götaland	86.4	48.3	2,594,763	1,090,832	491,911	311,195	327,799	120,011	146,898	89,196	16,921	1,357,741	1,130,905
Svealand	85.6	37.3	2,006,083	827,310	419,786	271,806	175,982	138,951	114,016	43,639	14,593	1,080,277	867,574
Norrland	85.4	14.4	772,873	403,684	71,529	72,719	103,459	55,069	36,021	25,347	5,045	494,774	247,707
Total	86.0	100.0	5,373,719	2,321,826	983,226	655,720	607,240	314,031	296,935	158,182	36,559	2,932,792	2,246,186
Source: SCB

== Results by constituency ==
=== Percentage share ===
Location	Land	Turnout	Share	Votes	S	M	FP	C	VPK	MP	KDS	Other	Left	Right	Margin
Location		%	%		%	%	%	%	%	%	%	%	%	%	
Blekinge	G	86.0	1.8	98,424	52.2	13.8	9.6	11.3	4.8	5.3	2.8	0.2	62.3	34.7	27,201
Bohuslän	G	86.3	3.5	187,971	39.2	17.5	16.5	11.3	5.0	6.5	3.5	0.5	50.7	45.3	10,240
Gothenburg	G	84.6	5.1	271,974	37.1	20.3	17.0	4.8	9.0	7.8	2.6	1.3	54.0	42.1	32,317
Gotland	G	85.8	0.7	36,362	41.0	13.4	7.9	25.0	4.1	6.8	1.5	0.2	52.0	46.3	2,089
Gävleborg	N	84.6	3.5	187,245	51.9	9.6	9.7	13.2	7.2	5.1	2.7	0.6	64.2	32.5	59,266
Halland	G	87.3	2.9	157,729	38.0	19.5	13.1	17.9	3.4	5.7	2.1	0.2	47.1	50.5	5,353
Jämtland	N	84.2	1.6	86,513	50.0	10.5	8.7	18.2	5.5	5.0	1.9	0.1	60.5	37.4	19,931
Jönköping	G	87.9	3.7	197,555	40.0	16.2	11.2	14.5	3.4	3.8	10.6	0.4	47.1	41.9	10,337
Kalmar	G	86.6	2.9	156,667	45.4	15.9	8.1	18.1	4.5	4.3	3.5	0.2	54.2	42.1	19,072
Kopparberg	S	84.0	3.4	180,125	47.0	12.4	10.5	15.0	6.0	5.7	3.1	0.4	58.7	37.8	37,614
Kristianstad	G	84.7	3.3	179,312	42.7	21.3	10.6	14.6	2.8	5.2	2.6	0.4	50.6	45.4	7,520
Kronoberg	G	86.6	2.1	112,094	41.1	17.1	9.3	18.5	4.7	5.2	3.9	0.1	51.1	44.8	6,990
Malmö area	G	86.0	5.5	295,675	42.8	24.5	10.4	12.5	2.2	5.2	1.5	0.9	55.2	41.2	41,167
Malmöhus	G	86.6	3.6	192,546	42.8	24.5	10.4	12.5	2.2	5.2	1.5	0.9	50.2	47.4	5,502
Norrbotten	N	85.1	3.1	166,243	58.1	8.5	7.5	8.6	10.2	3.6	2.4	1.1	72.0	24.6	78,803
Skaraborg	G	86.4	3.3	175,001	40.5	16.8	11.6	17.8	4.0	4.9	4.3	0.2	49.3	46.2	5,465
Stockholm	S	84.7	8.0	432,490	33.6	27.6	14.5	4.2	10.3	6.9	1.8	1.1	50.8	46.3	19,484
Stockholm County	S	86.3	10.3	556,085	35.4	27.4	16.0	6.3	6.4	6.0	1.8	0.7	47.7	49.8	11,410
Södermanland	S	86.7	3.0	159,527	49.7	15.3	12.0	10.0	4.8	5.1	2.4	0.7	59.6	37.3	35,481
Uppsala	S	86.3	3.0	160,675	40.8	18.4	13.6	12.3	6.2	5.7	2.0	1.0	52.7	44.3	13,615
Värmland	S	85.3	3.4	182,427	49.2	14.7	10.1	14.1	5.4	4.6	1.8	0.1	59.1	38.9	36,929
Västerbotten	N	86.6	3.0	159,304	48.4	8.9	12.0	14.3	5.9	4.6	5.2	0.7	58.9	35.2	37,661
Västernorrland	N	86.6	3.2	173,568	51.6	9.4	8.8	14.9	6.0	5.1	3.6	0.6	62.7	33.1	51,406
Västmanland	S	85.0	3.0	158,748	50.2	14.0	12.7	9.6	5.8	4.5	2.3	0.9	60.5	36.4	38,252
Älvsborg N	G	86.7	3.0	160,545	41.7	15.1	13.1	15.3	4.9	6.2	3.5	0.2	52.8	43.5	14,947
Älvsborg S	G	88.0	2.2	116,173	43.1	18.0	11.2	15.0	3.9	5.1	3.6	0.1	52.1	44.2	9,230
Örebro	S	86.5	3.3	176,006	49.0	12.8	12.3	10.7	6.6	4.4	3.6	0.6	60.0	35.8	42,738
Östergötland	G	86.5	4.8	256,735	45.6	17.5	10.9	11.8	5.1	5.2	3.6	0.4	55.9	40.2	40,112
Total		86.0	100.0	5,373,719	43.2	18.3	12.2	11.3	5.8	5.5	2.9	0.7	54.6	41.8	686,606
Source: SCB

=== By votes ===
Location	Land	Turnout	Share	Votes	S	M	FP	C	VPK	MP	KDS	Other	Left	Right	Margin
Location		%	%												
Blekinge	G	86.0	1.8	98,424	51,412	13,573	9,466	11,120	4,713	5,235	2,746	159	61,360	34,159	27,201
Bohuslän	G	86.3	3.5	187,971	73,744	32,824	31,064	21,207	9,320	12,271	6,604	937	95,335	85,095	10,240
Gothenburg	G	84.6	5.1	271,974	100,938	55,214	46,299	12,972	24,523	21,341	7,060	3,627	146,802	114,485	32,317
Gotland	G	85.8	0.7	36,362	14,926	4,880	2,871	9,079	1,508	2,485	555	58	18,919	16,830	2,089
Gävleborg	N	84.6	3.5	187,245	97,147	17,939	18,256	24,730	13,524	9,520	5,059	1,070	120,191	60,925	59,266
Halland	G	87.3	2.9	157,729	59,882	30,781	20,709	28,225	5,434	9,046	3,307	345	74,362	79,715	5,353
Jämtland	N	84.2	1.6	86,513	43,271	9,106	7,529	15,763	4,752	4,306	1,683	103	52,329	32,398	19,931
Jönköping	G	87.9	3.7	197,555	78,968	32,004	22,081	28,712	6,659	7,507	20,853	771	93,134	82,797	10,337
Kalmar	G	86.6	2.9	156,667	71,092	24,839	12,684	28,361	7,072	6,792	5,549	278	84,956	65,884	19,072
Kopparberg	S	84.0	3.4	180,125	84,653	22,265	18,917	26,945	10,802	10,286	5,626	631	105,741	68,127	37,614
Kristianstad	G	84.7	3.3	179,312	76,572	38,130	19,003	26,112	4,934	9,259	4,599	703	90,765	83,245	7,520
Kronoberg	G	86.6	2.1	112,094	46,083	19,149	10,387	20,732	5,297	5,878	4,409	159	57,258	50,268	6,990
Malmö area	G	86.0	5.5	295,675	129,795	73,842	34,258	13,826	13,936	19,362	4,208	6,448	163,093	121,926	41,167
Malmöhus	G	86.6	3.6	192,546	82,477	47,193	20,010	23,999	4,255	9,972	2,832	1,808	96,704	91,202	5,502
Norrbotten	N	85.1	3.1	166,243	96,587	14,082	12,452	14,287	17,035	6,002	4,047	1,751	119,624	40,821	78,803
Skaraborg	G	86.4	3.3	175,001	70,812	29,476	20,263	31,102	6,938	8,556	7,591	263	86,306	80,841	5,465
Stockholm	S	84.7	8.0	432,490	145,524	119,567	62,511	18,195	44,339	29,894	7,834	4,626	219,757	200,273	19,484
Stockholm County	S	86.3	10.3	556,085	196,700	152,483	89,048	35,288	35,440	33,269	9,891	3,966	265,409	276,819	11,410
Södermanland	S	86.7	3.0	159,527	79,234	24,342	19,209	16,014	7,673	8,139	3,816	1,100	95,046	59,565	35,481
Uppsala	S	86.3	3.0	160,675	65,580	29,516	21,854	19,765	10,022	9,148	3,224	1,566	84,750	71,135	13,615
Värmland	S	85.3	3.4	182,427	89,678	26,840	18,489	25,639	9,914	8,305	3,364	198	107,897	70,968	36,929
Västerbotten	N	86.6	3.0	159,304	77,054	14,160	19,127	22,818	9,381	7,331	8,318	1,115	93,766	56,105	37,661
Västernorrland	N	86.6	3.2	173,568	89,625	16,242	15,355	25,861	10,377	8,862	6,240	1,006	108,864	57,458	51,406
Västmanland	S	85.0	3.0	158,748	79,629	22,303	20,175	15,279	9,231	7,149	3,589	1,393	96,009	57,757	38,252
Älvsborg N	G	86.7	3.0	160,545	66,949	24,265	21,045	24,546	7,840	10,014	5,543	343	84,803	69,856	14,947
Älvsborg S	G	88.0	2.2	116,173	50,092	20,923	12,970	17,432	4,573	5,890	4,197	96	60,555	51,325	9,230
Örebro	S	86.5	3.3	176,006	86,312	22,470	21,603	18,857	11,530	7,826	6,295	1,113	105,668	62,930	42,738
Östergötland	G	86.5	4.8	256,735	117,090	44,818	28,085	30,374	13,009	13,290	9,143	926	143,389	103,277	40,112
Total		86.0	100.0	5,373,719	2,321,826	983,226	655,720	607,240	314,031	296,935	158,182	36,559	2,932,792	2,246,186	686,606
Source: SCB

== Municipal summary ==
Location	County	Turnout	Votes	S	M	FP	C	VPK	MP	KDS	Other	Left	Right
Ale	Älvsborg	87.4	14,266	46.5	12.9	12.1	12.7	6.1	6.2	2.9	0.6	58.8	37.7
Alingsås	Älvsborg	88.1	20,833	37.7	16.6	16.0	12.4	5.1	6.7	5.2	0.2	49.5	45.1
Alvesta	Kronoberg	86.7	12,288	40.5	16.3	7.5	22.8	3.8	4.7	4.2	0.2	49.1	46.5
Aneby	Jönköping	88.9	4,439	30.4	14.2	10.1	23.5	2.1	4.1	15.5	0.1	36.5	47.9
Arboga	Västmanland	85.5	9,321	50.3	14.2	10.5	11.2	5.4	4.9	2.5	1.1	60.6	35.8
Arjeplog	Norrbotten	82.4	2,449	48.9	5.4	8.1	12.7	16.6	5.0	2.8	0.5	70.5	26.1
Arvidsjaur	Norrbotten	85.9	5,458	59.3	6.0	7.5	8.7	11.6	3.1	3.0	0.7	74.1	22.3
Arvika	Värmland	83.1	16,992	46.7	13.1	10.9	15.4	6.2	5.7	1.9	0.1	58.6	39.4
Askersund	Örebro	86.9	7,651	49.8	12.2	9.2	16.5	4.0	3.5	4.8	0.1	57.3	37.9
Avesta	Kopparberg	86.0	16,178	55.5	8.5	7.8	13.0	7.4	4.2	2.9	0.5	67.2	29.4
Bengtsfors	Älvsborg	84.9	7,593	45.0	11.5	9.8	21.3	3.8	5.1	3.5	0.1	53.9	42.6
Berg	Jämtland	83.1	5,548	44.2	9.8	5.7	30.2	3.6	4.3	2.1	0.1	52.1	45.7
Bjurholm	Västerbotten	87.6	2,082	37.1	13.3	18.3	21.1	1.2	2.7	6.0	0.2	41.1	52.7
Bjuv	Malmöhus	86.5	8,372	58.3	14.6	8.9	8.6	3.9	3.9	1.3	0.4	66.1	32.1
Boden	Norrbotten	86.6	19,112	57.9	11.0	8.8	7.7	7.7	3.3	2.9	0.7	69.0	27.5
Bollnäs	Gävleborg	83.6	17,916	48.1	9.1	10.4	16.8	6.9	5.3	3.0	0.5	60.3	36.3
Borgholm	Kalmar	86.1	7,408	29.0	16.4	7.3	33.7	2.5	6.1	4.9	0.1	37.6	57.5
Borlänge	Kopparberg	84.6	29,220	52.1	10.7	10.6	10.5	6.7	6.0	2.5	0.9	64.8	31.8
Borås	Älvsborg	87.6	65,681	45.4	19.1	12.0	10.0	4.6	5.0	3.8	0.1	55.0	41.2
Botkyrka	Stockholm	82.8	32,532	42.7	20.2	14.2	6.0	8.1	5.9	1.8	1.1	56.6	40.4
Boxholm	Östergötland	88.8	3,748	55.2	8.2	5.3	17.9	6.0	3.9	3.3	0.1	65.1	31.4
Bromölla	Kristianstad	86.4	7,649	65.1	9.9	7.0	6.8	5.0	4.7	1.3	0.1	74.8	23.8
Bräcke	Jämtland	85.0	5,581	57.9	8.4	5.3	17.6	5.6	4.3	0.9	0.1	67.7	31.2
Burlöv	Malmöhus	88.5	9,111	52.7	21.4	9.9	4.4	4.0	5.0	0.9	1.6	61.7	35.8
Båstad	Kristianstad	86.7	8,462	21.3	32.3	13.6	23.8	1.0	5.9	1.8	0.4	28.1	69.7
Dals-Ed	Älvsborg	82.3	3,222	30.0	12.6	10.5	32.2	2.4	7.0	5.2	0.2	39.4	55.2
Danderyd	Stockholm	92.0	19,247	14.9	53.1	18.3	4.0	2.4	5.4	1.6	0.3	22.7	75.4
Degerfors	Örebro	90.1	7,767	63.7	6.3	6.8	8.2	8.8	3.4	2.5	0.3	75.8	21.3
Dorotea	Västerbotten	83.9	2,492	57.1	4.9	8.8	17.6	6.2	3.4	2.0	0.0	66.7	31.3
Eda	Värmland	83.8	5,530	52.5	10.6	7.1	19.9	4.5	3.6	1.7	0.1	60.6	37.6
Ekerö	Stockholm	89.5	10,902	26.7	31.6	18.8	9.1	4.7	7.1	1.7	0.2	38.5	59.6
Eksjö	Jönköping	86.4	11,669	33.9	17.5	11.6	20.6	2.8	4.6	9.0	0.1	41.2	49.7
Emmaboda	Kalmar	88.9	7,193	47.9	11.7	6.1	22.9	3.8	4.6	2.8	0.3	56.2	40.6
Enköping	Uppsala	84.5	20,725	41.9	17.8	11.7	18.4	3.4	4.3	1.7	0.9	49.6	47.9
Eskilstuna	Södermanland	85.0	54,494	52.3	14.1	13.3	7.4	4.9	4.5	2.3	0.2	61.7	34.8
Eslöv	Malmöhus	85.2	17,156	47.8	18.6	8.2	16.4	2.2	4.3	1.9	0.6	54.3	43.2
Essunga	Skaraborg	86.1	3,742	26.8	22.2	10.2	30.9	2.5	4.3	2.9	0.1	33.7	63.3
Fagersta	Västmanland	86.3	8,939	61.9	10.6	8.6	6.4	6.0	4.1	1.1	1.3	72.0	25.6
Falkenberg	Halland	87.4	23,337	38.3	16.0	9.6	25.3	2.9	5.7	2.1	0.1	46.8	50.9
Falköping	Skaraborg	86.8	21,035	36.9	16.9	10.3	23.2	3.6	4.5	4.6	0.1	45.0	50.3
Falun	Kopparberg	83.7	32,920	39.4	18.1	14.3	13.3	5.2	6.1	3.3	0.2	50.8	45.7
Filipstad	Värmland	84.6	8,915	62.0	10.9	7.8	7.3	6.6	4.2	1.2	0.1	72.7	26.0
Finspång	Östergötland	88.5	15,190	56.1	10.5	8.4	10.3	5.5	4.9	4.1	0.2	66.5	29.2
Flen	Södermanland	87.3	10,821	50.2	13.2	9.3	14.3	5.0	5.2	2.3	0.4	60.4	36.8
Forshaga	Värmland	87.1	7,326	57.1	11.1	9.4	11.7	4.5	4.1	2.0	0.2	65.7	32.2
Färgelanda	Älvsborg	86.2	4,688	38.6	12.4	9.0	30.0	2.2	5.5	2.2	0.0	46.3	51.4
Gagnef	Kopparberg	86.1	6,186	42.9	10.7	8.9	22.2	4.2	6.6	4.4	0.1	53.7	41.7
Gislaved	Jönköping	87.8	17,536	40.3	16.3	11.7	19.5	2.7	3.8	5.5	0.2	46.8	47.5
Gnosjö	Jönköping	88.7	5,719	34.2	17.3	13.4	13.9	3.2	3.3	14.4	0.2	40.8	44.6
Gothenburg	Gothenburg	84.6	271,974	37.1	20.3	17.0	4.8	9.0	7.8	2.6	1.3	54.0	42.1
Gotland	Gotland	85.8	36,362	41.0	13.4	7.9	25.0	4.1	6.8	1.5	0.2	52.0	46.3
Grums	Värmland	84.7	6,442	58.9	9.4	6.5	13.8	6.1	3.8	1.4	0.1	68.8	29.7
Grästorp	Skaraborg	86.3	3,813	29.6	21.2	10.8	28.1	2.4	5.0	2.7	0.1	37.0	60.2
Gullspång	Skaraborg	84.8	4,041	44.7	14.9	8.4	19.9	3.8	4.9	3.2	0.1	53.4	43.3
Gällivare	Norrbotten	79.6	14,065	57.0	9.1	5.2	4.9	16.8	3.6	1.4	2.0	77.4	19.2
Gävle	Gävleborg	84.9	57,369	52.3	12.5	13.0	7.4	6.4	5.5	2.2	0.7	64.2	32.9
Götene	Skaraborg	87.8	8,371	40.4	15.2	12.3	17.5	3.8	4.7	6.2	0.0	48.9	44.9
Habo	Skaraborg	88.4	5,320	34.2	18.8	13.6	14.9	2.5	4.4	11.6	0.0	41.1	47.3
Hagfors	Värmland	88.5	11,412	63.6	7.6	4.4	11.4	8.0	3.6	1.3	0.0	75.3	23.4
Hallsberg	Örebro	87.7	10,778	53.0	9.6	9.5	13.7	6.5	4.0	3.3	0.3	63.4	32.9
Hallstahammar	Västmanland	85.7	10,231	59.2	10.6	9.3	6.7	8.0	3.1	1.6	1.4	70.3	26.6
Halmstad	Halland	86.9	50,730	44.2	19.4	13.1	11.0	4.3	5.8	1.9	0.3	54.3	43.5
Hammarö	Värmland	89.8	8,596	55.0	15.6	11.3	6.7	6.1	4.3	0.9	0.1	65.4	33.6
Haninge	Stockholm	84.4	33,686	41.9	20.5	15.6	6.2	7.5	5.9	1.6	0.8	55.3	42.3
Haparanda	Norrbotten	80.4	4,903	54.8	13.1	4.2	15.4	6.0	3.3	2.1	1.2	64.1	32.7
Heby	Västmanland	85.2	8,275	43.5	9.2	8.0	26.6	5.4	3.8	3.2	0.3	52.7	43.8
Hedemora	Kopparberg	85.1	10,615	47.5	11.4	9.1	16.3	6.6	5.6	2.9	0.5	59.8	36.8
Helsingborg	Malmöhus	84.3	67,875	44.1	23.1	13.0	5.9	4.0	6.6	1.7	1.6	54.7	42.0
Herrljunga	Älvsborg	89.2	6,269	30.4	16.4	11.2	28.0	3.3	5.7	4.8	0.1	39.4	55.6
Hjo	Skaraborg	86.9	5,807	39.6	19.3	12.0	15.3	3.4	4.5	5.9	0.1	47.4	46.5
Hofors	Gävleborg	86.2	7,951	63.3	6.6	6.2	7.8	10.7	3.7	1.0	0.8	77.7	20.6
Huddinge	Stockholm	84.9	40,217	37.7	24.7	15.6	5.5	7.8	6.0	1.8	0.9	51.5	45.8
Hudiksvall	Gävleborg	82.7	23,658	44.7	8.5	8.2	20.0	8.2	6.6	3.5	0.2	59.5	36.8
Hultsfred	Kalmar	86.4	11,044	46.7	13.4	6.4	21.1	4.1	3.3	5.0	0.1	54.1	40.8
Hylte	Halland	86.2	6,890	42.1	12.0	9.2	27.2	1.7	5.4	2.4	0.1	49.1	48.4
Håbo	Uppsala	86.9	8,160	39.1	28.6	13.7	7.9	4.6	4.1	1.5	0.5	47.7	50.3
Hällefors	Örebro	84.0	6,076	63.7	7.6	6.7	6.9	9.2	4.6	1.3	0.0	77.5	21.2
Härjedalen	Jämtland	81.1	8,007	56.8	9.1	7.5	14.1	6.1	4.9	1.3	0.2	67.8	30.7
Härnösand	Västernorrland	85.9	18,031	42.5	14.1	9.6	18.2	6.2	6.4	2.8	0.1	55.2	41.9
Härryda	Bohuslän	87.6	15,648	35.1	19.9	19.1	10.1	5.6	7.5	2.3	0.4	48.2	49.1
Hässleholm	Kristianstad	85.2	31,207	40.3	19.6	10.0	17.6	2.9	5.1	4.0	0.4	48.3	47.2
Höganäs	Malmöhus	87.6	14,466	36.7	29.6	12.7	8.6	2.6	6.9	2.5	0.4	46.2	50.9
Högsby	Kalmar	87.5	4,862	45.1	12.6	6.2	22.0	5.1	4.0	4.8	0.1	54.3	40.8
Hörby	Malmöhus	83.8	8,152	31.1	19.0	12.0	26.8	1.6	4.5	4.2	0.8	37.2	57.8
Höör	Malmöhus	84.4	7,356	33.7	24.2	11.3	18.6	1.8	7.2	2.5	0.7	42.7	54.1
Jokkmokk	Norrbotten	78.9	4,192	59.3	7.4	9.1	5.3	10.7	6.0	1.8	0.4	76.0	21.8
Järfälla	Stockholm	88.3	34,152	37.9	25.2	17.4	4.8	6.1	5.5	2.2	0.9	49.5	47.4
Jönköping	Jönköping	88.0	71,859	42.2	16.7	12.2	9.0	4.1	4.1	11.0	0.7	50.3	38.0
Kalix	Norrbotten	86.8	12,371	64.6	7.0	6.1	9.9	6.3	3.4	1.5	1.3	74.2	23.0
Kalmar	Kalmar	86.2	36,434	45.9	19.6	10.2	11.8	4.5	4.8	2.8	0.3	55.2	41.6
Karlsborg	Skaraborg	89.2	5,491	45.8	15.0	11.2	16.4	3.0	5.4	3.0	0.1	54.2	42.7
Karlshamn	Blekinge	86.5	20,765	54.8	12.1	9.0	9.3	6.2	5.6	2.8	0.1	66.6	30.4
Karlskoga	Örebro	86.8	22,951	55.5	14.3	11.4	6.1	7.3	2.8	2.2	0.4	65.7	31.8
Karlskrona	Blekinge	87.6	39,230	49.3	15.3	11.0	11.4	4.7	5.1	3.1	0.2	59.0	37.6
Karlstad	Värmland	85.8	50,120	44.4	20.1	12.6	10.4	5.2	5.2	1.8	0.2	54.9	43.1
Katrineholm	Södermanland	87.8	20,978	52.8	12.7	9.9	11.4	4.2	5.0	3.4	0.6	62.0	34.0
Kil	Värmland	86.4	7,226	44.3	16.5	12.0	15.8	4.4	5.2	1.8	0.1	53.9	44.2
Kinda	Östergötland	87.1	6,619	36.6	14.3	9.3	26.4	2.8	4.4	6.1	0.2	43.8	50.0
Kiruna	Norrbotten	79.1	15,308	60.7	7.3	6.3	3.7	16.2	2.9	1.7	1.2	79.8	17.3
Klippan	Kristianstad	82.2	9,854	42.3	21.5	10.1	15.5	2.8	5.3	2.0	0.5	50.5	47.1
Kramfors	Västernorrland	88.4	17,246	53.6	7.7	4.4	18.2	7.5	5.0	2.9	0.7	66.1	30.3
Kristianstad	Kristianstad	85.5	45,811	46.3	20.1	12.5	10.6	3.1	5.3	1.9	0.2	54.7	43.1
Kristinehamn	Värmland	85.3	17,040	50.5	13.7	12.7	10.5	6.1	4.3	2.1	0.1	60.9	36.9
Krokom	Jämtland	84.8	8,647	47.2	9.8	6.6	24.3	4.5	4.9	2.6	0.1	56.6	40.7
Kumla	Örebro	87.3	11,624	50.0	10.8	11.3	12.7	6.0	3.6	5.2	0.2	59.4	34.9
Kungsbacka	Halland	88.5	32,691	27.5	27.6	20.0	13.4	3.0	6.3	1.8	0.3	36.8	61.1
Kungsör	Västmanland	87.5	5,247	48.5	12.3	12.1	13.0	5.7	5.9	1.9	0.7	60.1	37.3
Kungälv	Bohuslän	88.4	20,958	38.6	18.4	15.4	12.9	4.6	6.6	3.1	0.5	49.8	46.6
Kävlinge	Malmöhus	88.9	13,441	48.3	20.8	10.9	10.2	2.9	5.2	0.7	1.0	56.4	41.9
Köping	Västmanland	84.4	16,156	52.5	10.8	9.9	10.7	6.9	4.8	2.6	1.9	64.2	31.4
Laholm	Halland	85.9	13,666	32.2	18.3	9.4	30.0	2.5	5.6	1.9	0.1	40.3	57.7
Landskrona	Malmöhus	86.0	22,653	53.0	22.0	9.2	5.3	3.7	5.0	0.9	0.9	61.7	36.5
Laxå	Örebro	85.2	4,922	56.2	8.1	9.3	11.4	6.1	4.1	4.8	0.1	66.3	28.8
Leksand	Kopparberg	85.3	9,172	35.5	14.7	11.1	21.4	3.5	6.2	7.4	0.2	45.3	47.2
Lerum	Älvsborg	89.5	19,688	32.2	21.3	20.3	9.6	5.3	8.0	3.1	0.2	45.4	51.3
Lessebo	Kronoberg	90.0	5,757	55.4	11.3	6.7	11.6	8.6	4.2	2.3	0.0	68.2	29.5
Lidingö	Stockholm	89.7	25,573	19.7	44.4	19.8	4.6	3.9	6.1	1.2	0.3	29.6	68.8
Lidköping	Skaraborg	86.0	23,063	43.5	14.8	12.1	15.2	5.5	5.0	3.8	0.1	54.0	42.0
Lilla Edet	Älvsborg	85.7	7,344	48.5	10.6	9.4	16.2	6.2	6.1	2.7	0.3	60.8	36.2
Lindesberg	Örebro	85.4	15,627	47.8	11.2	9.7	16.7	5.5	5.2	3.8	0.1	58.4	37.6
Linköping	Östergötland	87.6	79,151	40.6	20.1	12.9	10.4	5.5	5.9	4.0	0.7	51.9	43.4
Ljungby	Kronoberg	85.4	17,158	39.0	15.0	8.7	22.3	3.9	5.8	5.2	0.1	48.8	45.9
Ljusdal	Gävleborg	80.6	13,310	49.0	8.4	9.4	17.6	7.7	4.3	2.7	0.8	61.1	35.4
Ljusnarsberg	Örebro	83.0	4,082	56.4	8.2	7.8	9.9	9.7	5.4	2.4	0.1	71.5	26.0
Lomma	Malmöhus	91.7	11,168	34.0	34.2	15.3	6.6	1.9	5.9	1.1	1.0	41.8	56.1
Ludvika	Kopparberg	84.9	19,133	57.4	9.5	7.7	8.3	9.4	5.4	2.2	0.2	72.1	25.5
Luleå	Norrbotten	86.8	43,932	54.1	10.4	10.3	8.0	9.4	4.7	2.1	1.1	68.2	28.7
Lund	Malmöhus	88.7	53,708	34.2	23.6	14.9	7.0	7.4	10.5	1.5	1.0	52.1	45.4
Lycksele	Västerbotten	85.9	9,072	52.0	8.2	12.3	9.4	5.6	2.9	9.1	0.3	60.6	30.0
Lysekil	Bohuslän	86.9	9,737	52.3	13.1	14.7	7.2	4.5	5.6	2.4	0.3	62.4	35.9
Malmö	Malmöhus	85.8	151,439	45.9	26.7	10.1	3.2	4.2	5.3	1.3	3.1	55.0	40.1
Malung	Kopparberg	86.1	7,762	47.6	13.6	10.8	18.3	3.7	4.4	1.5	0.1	55.6	42.7
Malå	Västerbotten	85.6	2,662	55.3	6.2	13.0	9.5	7.1	2.8	5.7	0.4	65.2	28.8
Mariestad	Skaraborg	84.6	15,732	43.6	16.9	12.2	13.2	4.9	5.3	3.6	0.3	53.8	42.3
Mark	Älvsborg	88.7	20,829	46.3	14.8	8.4	17.8	4.2	5.1	3.3	0.1	55.7	41.0
Markaryd	Kronoberg	84.6	6,778	45.2	14.9	7.8	17.6	4.0	5.2	5.2	0.1	54.3	40.3
Mellerud	Älvsborg	84.6	6,716	34.5	15.1	9.4	28.2	2.1	6.2	4.3	0.2	42.9	52.6
Mjölby	Östergötland	86.2	16,565	48.8	14.4	9.6	15.4	4.6	3.3	3.7	0.2	56.7	39.4
Mora	Kopparberg	80.1	12,097	40.0	14.0	11.4	20.4	5.0	6.3	2.8	0.1	51.3	45.8
Motala	Östergötland	86.5	26,610	52.9	12.4	11.2	10.3	5.3	4.8	2.9	0.2	63.0	33.9
Mullsjö	Skaraborg	90.0	4,292	34.9	16.7	11.3	15.6	3.2	5.2	12.9	0.2	43.3	43.6
Munkedal	Bohuslän	84.1	6,745	39.8	13.4	10.9	23.6	3.2	5.3	3.5	0.3	48.3	47.9
Munkfors	Värmland	88.8	3,412	68.9	5.6	5.9	9.8	5.5	2.8	1.2	0.2	77.2	21.4
Mölndal	Bohuslän	87.2	32,467	39.0	17.8	18.7	7.6	6.9	6.3	2.9	0.8	52.3	44.1
Mönsterås	Kalmar	88.1	8,682	48.5	13.3	6.2	18.9	5.4	3.9	3.8	0.0	57.8	38.4
Mörbylånga	Kalmar	87.7	8,298	37.8	19.0	8.9	24.6	2.7	4.4	2.2	0.4	44.9	52.6
Nacka	Stockholm	87.0	36,293	30.4	32.6	17.0	4.2	7.0	6.1	1.4	1.2	43.6	53.8
Nora	Örebro	85.5	6,327	49.3	12.6	11.7	10.9	5.8	5.9	3.5	0.3	61.1	35.1
Norberg	Västmanland	87.3	4,142	58.0	10.0	6.8	8.3	10.0	4.7	1.0	1.1	72.7	25.1
Nordanstig	Gävleborg	83.7	7,310	43.5	6.1	7.2	25.0	6.5	6.6	5.2	0.0	56.6	38.2
Nordmaling	Västerbotten	88.3	5,233	46.7	10.8	9.3	21.1	3.1	2.9	6.0	0.1	52.7	41.2
Norrköping	Östergötland	84.4	75,015	46.7	20.2	11.0	8.2	5.7	5.2	2.7	0.3	57.6	39.4
Norrtälje	Stockholm	85.0	27,530	41.6	18.3	11.1	16.6	5.1	5.2	1.9	0.2	51.9	46.0
Norsjö	Västerbotten	83.9	3,485	50.0	6.0	12.4	17.2	5.9	2.6	4.8	1.1	58.5	35.6
Nybro	Kalmar	87.0	13,704	47.5	13.3	7.0	20.0	4.5	3.7	3.8	0.2	55.7	40.3
Nyköping	Södermanland	87.8	42,503	46.1	17.9	11.3	11.9	4.4	5.7	2.3	0.4	56.2	41.1
Nynäshamn	Stockholm	87.1	13,619	48.7	15.4	11.7	7.6	7.5	7.0	1.9	0.3	63.2	34.7
Nässjö	Jönköping	88.6	20,766	45.3	14.2	9.6	15.2	3.3	3.0	9.1	0.2	51.6	39.0
Ockelbo	Gävleborg	83.5	4,192	51.9	7.0	6.4	21.3	6.1	4.8	2.3	0.1	62.8	34.8
Olofström	Blekinge	86.2	9,204	57.9	9.7	8.0	10.6	5.2	4.9	3.6	0.1	68.0	28.3
Orsa	Kopparberg	80.1	4,473	40.9	12.3	11.2	18.5	5.7	7.8	3.4	0.2	54.4	42.1
Orust	Bohuslän	84.9	8,262	36.0	16.4	15.6	18.8	3.6	6.8	2.4	0.4	46.4	50.7
Osby	Kristianstad	84.5	8,632	47.4	14.9	9.1	16.1	3.5	4.7	4.1	0.3	55.6	40.0
Oskarshamn	Kalmar	86.9	17,819	49.8	15.6	9.0	11.0	5.4	3.8	5.3	0.1	58.9	35.6
Ovanåker	Gävleborg	86.9	8,910	43.5	7.3	9.4	25.5	3.3	5.1	5.9	0.1	51.9	42.2
Oxelösund	Södermanland	87.1	8,181	58.7	11.5	9.0	5.1	9.0	5.1	1.1	0.6	72.8	25.6
Pajala	Norrbotten	81.9	5,341	51.1	8.1	5.2	9.7	18.4	2.1	2.9	2.6	71.5	23.0
Partille	Bohuslän	87.4	18,990	35.7	20.5	20.0	6.0	7.0	7.1	3.3	0.5	49.8	46.5
Perstorp	Kristianstad	84.3	4,388	47.1	19.1	10.3	12.8	2.0	4.8	2.6	1.3	53.9	42.2
Piteå	Norrbotten	89.8	26,038	63.2	6.0	6.4	10.3	6.5	3.1	4.0	0.5	72.8	22.7
Ragunda	Jämtland	85.0	4,712	56.5	6.3	4.8	20.4	5.2	5.1	1.6	0.1	66.9	31.5
Robertsfors	Västerbotten	87.5	4,967	37.3	7.9	10.5	31.5	3.6	3.4	5.6	0.2	44.3	49.9
Ronneby	Blekinge	87.2	18,992	53.3	12.7	8.7	13.9	4.2	5.3	1.7	0.1	62.9	35.3
Rättvik	Kopparberg	78.0	6,778	37.6	14.5	13.0	19.4	4.2	6.1	4.9	0.2	47.9	46.9
Sala	Västmanland	85.1	13,561	41.4	13.5	12.1	20.1	4.7	5.1	2.9	0.2	51.2	45.8
Salem	Stockholm	86.9	6,901	34.8	27.4	16.4	6.1	6.3	6.3	2.5	0.3	47.3	49.9
Sandviken	Gävleborg	87.4	26,910	58.1	9.6	8.5	9.7	7.4	3.8	2.1	0.8	69.3	27.8
Sigtuna	Stockholm	84.5	17,230	39.9	24.5	14.7	8.2	5.6	5.0	1.7	0.2	50.6	47.4
Simrishamn	Kristianstad	82.4	12,708	42.2	22.2	9.6	16.2	2.3	5.2	1.4	0.9	49.7	48.0
Sjöbo	Malmöhus	88.1	10,070	36.6	21.3	7.2	26.0	1.7	5.5	0.8	0.8	43.9	54.5
Skara	Skaraborg	86.5	11,866	42.4	17.7	11.4	15.6	3.5	6.1	3.0	0.2	52.1	44.7
Skinnskatteberg	Västmanland	85.0	3,161	61.0	8.6	5.8	11.2	6.9	4.6	1.4	0.5	72.5	25.6
Skellefteå	Västerbotten	86.5	48,522	52.9	7.2	10.9	14.3	5.4	3.5	5.0	0.7	61.8	32.4
Skurup	Malmöhus	85.6	7,953	41.3	20.5	9.0	20.4	1.8	4.9	1.1	1.0	48.0	49.8
Skövde	Skaraborg	86.2	29,447	43.2	17.1	13.0	13.2	4.7	5.0	3.7	0.2	52.9	43.3
Smedjebacken	Kopparberg	85.8	8,281	60.8	7.7	6.8	11.3	7.5	3.9	1.7	0.3	72.2	25.9
Sollefteå	Västernorrland	88.1	17,246	58.8	7.9	4.9	13.7	6.0	6.1	2.6	0.1	70.9	26.5
Sollentuna	Stockholm	88.3	30,276	31.0	29.6	18.2	5.8	5.7	6.6	2.6	0.5	43.3	53.5
Solna	Stockholm	83.5	34,961	34.5	29.4	15.3	4.4	8.0	5.8	1.7	0.9	48.3	49.0
Sorsele	Västerbotten	81.2	2,312	46.0	8.8	10.5	16.0	4.0	4.6	9.5	0.7	54.5	35.2
Sotenäs	Bohuslän	85.6	6,130	44.3	15.7	16.7	10.5	3.8	5.6	3.4	0.1	53.7	42.9
Staffanstorp	Malmöhus	90.9	11,020	38.4	29.3	12.9	9.8	1.8	5.5	1.1	1.2	45.7	52.1
Stenungsund	Bohuslän	86.0	10,833	38.5	18.3	16.7	13.1	4.1	6.3	2.7	0.3	48.9	48.0
Stockholm	Stockholm	84.7	432,490	33.6	27.6	14.5	4.2	10.3	6.9	1.8	1.1	50.8	46.3
Storfors	Värmland	88.3	3,400	58.6	11.4	7.1	11.9	5.7	3.6	1.5	0.1	68.0	30.4
Storuman	Västerbotten	81.3	4,962	45.8	11.7	13.3	11.5	3.6	4.8	8.9	0.2	54.3	36.5
Strängnäs	Södermanland	86.7	16,263	40.9	20.8	16.6	9.9	4.4	5.2	1.9	0.4	50.4	47.3
Strömstad	Bohuslän	82.1	6,040	42.6	14.2	13.4	17.0	3.2	7.0	2.5	0.2	52.7	44.6
Strömsund	Jämtland	84.9	10,763	58.0	6.7	5.7	18.3	5.4	3.9	2.1	0.1	67.2	30.6
Sundbyberg	Stockholm	84.2	19,428	43.5	20.1	14.0	4.2	9.7	5.9	1.6	1.2	59.0	38.3
Sundsvall	Västernorrland	85.6	61,022	49.8	11.1	11.4	12.1	6.4	4.9	3.2	1.1	61.2	34.6
Sunne	Värmland	84.8	8,833	36.6	16.1	9.4	29.7	2.3	4.0	1.9	0.1	42.9	55.2
Surahammar	Västmanland	86.5	6,601	64.2	7.9	8.6	5.2	8.1	3.7	1.9	0.4	76.0	21.7
Svalöv	Malmöhus	86.7	7,849	43.4	18.8	7.9	19.6	2.1	4.9	1.7	1.6	50.4	46.3
Svedala	Malmöhus	90.0	10,421	47.9	21.7	10.1	9.7	1.8	4.8	1.5	2.5	54.5	41.5
Svenljunga	Älvsborg	87.0	7,042	35.6	18.3	10.2	24.6	2.4	5.6	3.2	0.0	43.7	53.1
Säffle	Värmland	83.6	11,631	42.9	14.8	9.6	22.0	3.8	4.0	2.8	0.1	50.7	46.3
Säter	Kopparberg	84.6	6,970	42.0	12.2	10.0	22.0	5.2	5.3	3.3	0.1	52.4	44.2
Sävsjö	Jönköping	87.3	7,478	29.3	18.0	8.9	24.2	2.0	3.4	13.9	0.2	34.8	51.1
Söderhamn	Gävleborg	85.6	19,719	58.6	7.6	6.9	11.1	8.8	4.2	2.0	0.7	71.7	25.6
Söderköping	Östergötland	86.3	7,933	36.3	18.9	9.8	21.7	3.1	6.9	3.3	0.1	46.3	50.4
Södertälje	Stockholm	83.0	44,563	43.7	18.3	14.0	7.7	6.8	6.5	1.8	1.1	57.1	40.0
Sölvesborg	Blekinge	86.5	10,233	51.3	17.4	8.7	10.8	2.9	6.1	2.7	0.1	60.3	36.8
Tanum	Bohuslän	82.3	7,138	28.0	18.4	16.1	25.5	2.2	7.6	1.9	0.4	37.8	59.9
Tibro	Skaraborg	86.6	7,053	43.3	13.3	15.4	14.7	3.9	4.2	5.1	0.1	51.4	43.4
Tidaholm	Skaraborg	88.0	8,694	49.1	12.9	9.8	16.4	3.8	4.0	3.6	0.4	56.9	39.1
Tierp	Uppsala	87.7	13,264	54.9	8.0	8.7	19.0	3.0	3.4	2.2	0.8	61.3	35.7
Timrå	Västernorrland	86.3	11,998	59.0	5.6	7.8	12.5	8.4	3.6	2.9	0.2	71.1	25.9
Tingsryd	Kronoberg	84.8	9,114	36.8	17.6	6.5	27.4	3.6	4.1	3.8	0.2	44.5	51.5
Tjörn	Bohuslän	84.9	8,089	27.4	20.2	23.3	10.1	2.8	6.9	9.2	0.1	37.1	53.6
Tomelilla	Kristianstad	82.0	7,635	38.6	21.7	7.6	23.8	1.7	4.6	1.6	0.4	45.0	53.1
Torsby	Värmland	84.8	9,945	50.6	13.3	6.5	16.8	7.0	4.2	1.5	0.1	61.9	36.6
Torsås	Kalmar	86.6	5,116	37.3	14.6	6.6	30.6	1.8	4.6	4.4	0.2	43.6	51.7
Tranemo	Älvsborg	90.0	7,930	40.5	15.8	9.7	24.6	2.4	4.6	2.3	0.1	47.5	50.1
Tranås	Jönköping	87.3	11,995	44.9	16.3	10.7	11.1	3.4	3.9	9.5	0.1	52.2	38.2
Trelleborg	Malmöhus	86.4	22,271	54.1	18.9	7.8	9.4	2.5	5.0	1.2	0.9	61.7	36.2
Trollhättan	Älvsborg	86.0	31,716	52.3	13.0	11.9	9.0	5.7	5.7	2.2	0.2	63.8	33.8
Tyresö	Stockholm	88.0	19,597	36.0	26.1	16.6	5.2	7.6	6.0	1.8	0.7	49.5	48.0
Täby	Stockholm	90.1	34,603	22.7	40.4	20.1	5.3	3.7	5.6	1.6	0.6	32.0	65.7
Töreboda	Skaraborg	82.8	6,398	38.5	16.3	8.3	25.1	3.6	4.8	3.4	0.1	46.8	49.6
Uddevalla	Bohuslän	85.5	30,277	47.3	14.3	12.3	11.3	4.8	5.9	3.1	0.9	58.1	37.9
Ulricehamn	Älvsborg	88.0	14,691	33.3	18.7	12.4	23.7	2.0	5.5	4.3	0.2	40.8	54.7
Umeå	Västerbotten	87.0	55,714	44.8	10.8	13.4	11.6	7.6	6.6	4.0	1.1	59.1	35.8
Upplands-Bro	Stockholm	86.3	10,972	42.5	21.9	14.7	6.6	6.6	5.1	2.4	0.2	54.3	43.2
Upplands Väsby	Stockholm	85.4	19,221	40.6	22.7	16.1	5.6	6.4	6.3	1.7	0.6	53.3	44.4
Uppsala	Uppsala	86.5	99,551	36.5	20.4	15.5	10.0	7.6	6.8	2.2	1.1	50.9	45.9
Uppvidinge	Kronoberg	86.3	6,900	45.9	11.2	6.8	23.2	5.5	3.9	3.6	0.1	55.2	41.2
Vadstena	Östergötland	88.4	5,096	44.2	18.8	10.1	15.0	3.3	4.8	3.7	0.1	52.3	43.9
Vaggeryd	Jönköping	89.9	7,873	40.5	14.8	9.0	15.3	4.1	2.5	13.7	0.2	47.0	39.1
Valdemarsvik	Östergötland	87.3	5,684	47.7	14.7	6.9	20.8	3.3	4.0	2.5	0.1	55.0	42.3
Vallentuna	Stockholm	87.5	12,105	29.1	30.8	15.4	9.8	4.8	7.2	2.3	0.6	41.1	56.0
Vansbro	Kopparberg	83.9	5,206	45.1	10.8	8.9	20.5	4.6	5.4	4.6	0.1	55.1	40.2
Vara	Skaraborg	85.7	10,836	29.4	22.7	9.8	28.6	2.1	4.5	2.9	0.1	35.9	61.1
Varberg	Halland	87.3	30,415	40.3	15.9	11.0	21.0	3.7	5.3	2.8	0.1	49.2	47.9
Vaxholm	Stockholm	88.9	4,243	30.8	30.2	17.6	7.1	5.4	7.5	1.2	0.2	43.8	54.9
Vellinge	Malmöhus	92.0	17,404	26.9	45.3	12.9	6.5	1.0	5.0	1.3	0.9	33.0	64.8
Vetlanda	Jönköping	86.6	18,159	35.6	15.1	9.6	21.7	2.8	3.9	11.0	0.1	42.4	46.4
Vilhelmina	Västerbotten	83.4	5,380	53.1	5.6	12.1	13.1	5.1	4.4	6.3	0.2	62.7	30.8
Vimmerby	Kalmar	86.7	10,394	39.4	15.4	6.2	28.2	3.3	4.0	3.4	0.1	46.6	49.8
Vindeln	Västerbotten	85.3	4,252	38.3	11.1	14.2	22.2	2.7	4.5	6.7	0.3	45.5	47.5
Vingåker	Södermanland	87.9	6,287	50.7	10.7	10.2	14.5	4.1	6.3	3.2	0.3	61.1	35.4
Vårgårda	Älvsborg	88.7	6,247	27.8	16.9	13.8	25.2	2.7	5.4	7.8	0.4	35.9	55.9
Vänersborg	Älvsborg	85.5	23,357	41.6	15.7	12.9	14.7	5.4	6.6	2.9	0.2	53.6	43.3
Vännäs	Västerbotten	86.8	5,276	46.9	7.9	9.2	21.0	5.5	3.7	5.5	0.4	56.1	38.0
Värmdö	Stockholm	86.8	11,956	38.5	26.6	13.8	6.2	7.2	5.8	1.3	0.5	51.5	46.7
Värnamo	Jönköping	87.9	20,062	38.2	16.3	11.3	15.7	2.9	3.8	11.3	0.5	44.9	43.3
Västervik	Kalmar	85.3	25,713	49.5	14.9	8.4	14.2	6.0	4.5	2.4	0.1	60.0	37.5
Västerås	Västmanland	84.3	73,114	47.2	17.5	16.3	6.3	5.1	4.6	2.3	0.8	56.9	40.0
Växjö	Kronoberg	87.2	43,966	39.1	20.0	11.9	14.3	5.3	5.8	3.5	0.2	50.2	46.2
Ydre	Östergötland	88.6	2,828	28.5	13.2	12.0	30.0	2.2	6.0	8.1	0.1	36.7	55.1
Ystad	Malmöhus	86.2	16,336	46.6	23.0	9.8	12.5	2.2	4.7	0.9	0.4	53.4	45.3
Åmål	Älvsborg	84.2	8,606	47.8	14.6	9.6	17.2	4.0	4.3	2.6	0.0	56.1	41.3
Ånge	Västernorrland	84.6	8,507	53.1	6.4	5.7	18.8	7.4	5.7	2.7	0.2	66.2	31.0
Åre	Jämtland	84.3	6,288	42.0	11.0	10.9	22.9	4.7	5.9	2.4	0.2	52.6	44.8
Årjäng	Värmland	77.8	5,607	30.5	14.0	10.3	33.9	2.4	4.5	4.4	0.1	37.3	58.1
Åsele	Västerbotten	86.2	2,893	57.9	5.5	7.7	16.8	3.7	3.5	4.7	0.2	65.1	30.0
Åstorp	Kristianstad	83.8	7,414	51.0	20.8	8.4	10.7	2.5	3.9	2.0	0.6	57.5	39.9
Åtvidaberg	Östergötland	89.1	8,409	54.5	11.6	7.9	15.1	2.7	4.4	3.6	0.1	61.6	34.6
Älmhult	Kronoberg	86.8	10,133	44.0	17.2	7.7	18.5	3.3	5.3	3.8	0.1	52.7	43.4
Älvdalen	Kopparberg	80.8	5,134	45.2	8.6	10.2	22.3	3.9	7.3	2.4	0.1	56.3	41.2
Älvkarleby	Uppsala	88.4	6,096	68.4	6.3	8.4	5.9	6.3	3.2	1.1	0.3	77.9	20.6
Älvsbyn	Norrbotten	88.1	6,315	61.6	4.6	5.2	11.1	10.4	2.7	3.7	0.7	74.7	20.9
Ängelholm	Kristianstad	85.1	20,752	32.7	30.8	11.5	14.5	2.1	6.0	2.1	0.3	40.8	56.8
Öckerö	Bohuslän	87.8	6,657	30.0	23.8	16.9	5.1	3.2	7.3	13.7	0.0	40.5	45.8
Ödeshög	Östergötland	88.4	3,887	39.4	14.9	7.9	22.8	2.9	4.2	7.8	0.1	46.5	45.6
Örebro	Örebro	86.5	78,201	43.2	15.0	15.3	10.1	6.4	5.0	3.9	1.1	54.6	40.4
Örkelljunga	Kristianstad	82.4	5,556	29.2	27.5	11.4	18.4	1.4	5.0	6.6	0.4	35.6	57.4
Örnsköldsvik	Västernorrland	87.7	39,518	52.1	7.7	9.2	16.7	3.5	4.7	5.8	0.4	60.2	33.6
Östersund	Jämtland	84.5	36,967	47.1	13.0	11.4	14.9	6.1	5.4	2.0	0.1	58.5	39.3
Österåker	Stockholm	87.4	16,278	31.9	30.6	17.7	6.8	5.1	6.3	1.2	0.5	43.2	55.1
Östhammar	Uppsala	84.5	12,879	46.0	13.3	9.5	19.5	4.8	4.2	1.7	1.0	55.0	42.3
Östra Göinge	Kristianstad	85.7	9,244	56.1	12.1	8.7	11.6	3.8	4.3	3.1	0.3	64.2	32.4
Överkalix	Norrbotten	84.4	3,142	63.9	4.5	3.6	14.2	9.6	2.5	0.5	1.2	76.0	22.2
Övertorneå	Norrbotten	83.8	3,617	48.6	9.2	5.1	20.2	10.9	2.1	2.5	1.3	61.7	34.5
Total		86.0	5,373,719	43.2	18.3	12.2	11.3	5.8	5.5	2.9	0.7	54.6	41.8
Source: SCB

== Municipal results ==
Votes by municipality. The municipalities are the color of the party that got the most votes within the coalition that won relative majority.

Cartogram of the map to the left with each municipality rescaled to the number of valid votes cast.

Map showing the voting shifts from the 1985 to the 1988 election. Darker blue indicates a municipality voted more towards the parties that formed the centre-right bloc. Darker red indicates a municipality voted more towards the parties that form the left-wing bloc.

Votes by municipality as a scale from red/Left-wing bloc to blue/Centre-right bloc.

Cartogram of vote with each municipality rescaled in proportion to number of valid votes cast. Deeper blue represents a relative majority for the centre-right coalition, brighter red represents a relative majority for the left-wing coalition.

=== Blekinge ===
Location	Turnout	Share	Votes	S	M	FP	C	VPK	MP	KDS	Other	Left	Right
Karlshamn	86.5	21.1	20,765	54.8	12.1	9.0	9.3	6.2	5.6	2.8	0.1	66.6	30.4
Karlskrona	87.6	39.9	39,230	49.3	15.3	11.0	11.4	4.7	5.1	3.1	0.2	59.0	37.6
Olofström	86.2	9.4	9,204	57.9	9.7	8.0	10.6	5.2	4.9	3.6	0.1	68.0	28.3
Ronneby	87.2	19.3	18,992	53.3	12.7	8.7	13.9	4.2	5.3	1.7	0.1	62.9	35.3
Sölvesborg	86.5	10.4	10,233	51.3	17.4	8.7	10.8	2.9	6.1	2.7	0.1	60.3	36.8
Total	86.0	1.8	98,424	52.2	13.8	9.6	11.3	4.8	5.3	2.8	0.2	62.3	34.7
Source: SCB

=== Dalarna ===
Kopparberg County

Location	Turnout	Share	Votes	S	M	FP	C	VPK	MP	KDS	Other	Left	Right
Avesta	86.0	9.0	16,178	55.5	8.5	7.8	13.0	7.4	4.2	2.9	0.5	67.2	29.4
Borlänge	84.6	16.2	29,220	52.1	10.7	10.6	10.5	6.7	6.0	2.5	0.9	64.8	31.8
Falun	83.7	18.3	32,920	39.4	18.1	14.3	13.3	5.2	6.1	3.3	0.2	50.8	45.7
Gagnef	86.1	3.4	6,186	42.9	10.7	8.9	22.2	4.2	6.6	4.4	0.1	53.7	41.7
Hedemora	85.1	5.9	10,615	47.5	11.4	9.1	16.3	6.6	5.6	2.9	0.5	59.8	36.8
Leksand	85.3	5.1	9,172	35.5	14.7	11.1	21.4	3.5	6.2	7.4	0.2	45.3	47.2
Ludvika	84.9	10.6	19,133	57.4	9.5	7.7	8.3	9.4	5.4	2.2	0.2	72.1	25.5
Malung	86.1	4.3	7,762	47.6	13.6	10.8	18.3	3.7	4.4	1.5	0.1	55.6	42.7
Mora	80.1	6.7	12,097	40.0	14.0	11.4	20.4	5.0	6.3	2.8	0.1	51.3	45.8
Orsa	80.1	2.5	4,473	40.9	12.3	11.2	18.5	5.7	7.8	3.4	0.2	54.4	42.1
Rättvik	78.0	3.8	6,778	37.6	14.5	13.0	19.4	4.2	6.1	4.9	0.2	47.9	46.9
Smedjebacken	85.8	4.6	8,281	60.8	7.7	6.8	11.3	7.5	3.9	1.7	0.3	72.2	25.9
Säter	84.6	3.9	6,970	42.0	12.2	10.0	22.0	5.2	5.3	3.3	0.1	52.4	44.2
Vansbro	83.9	2.9	5,206	45.1	10.8	8.9	20.5	4.6	5.4	4.6	0.1	55.1	40.2
Älvdalen	80.8	2.9	5,134	45.2	8.6	10.2	22.3	3.9	7.3	2.4	0.1	56.3	41.2
Total	84.0	3.4	180,125	47.0	12.4	10.5	15.0	6.0	5.7	3.1	0.4	58.7	37.8
Source: SCB

=== Gotland ===
Location	Turnout	Share	Votes	S	M	FP	C	VPK	MP	KDS	Other	Left	Right
Gotland	85.8	100.0	36,362	41.0	13.4	7.9	25.0	4.1	6.8	1.5	0.2	52.0	46.3
Total	85.8	0.7	36,362	41.0	13.4	7.9	25.0	4.1	6.8	1.5	0.2	52.0	46.3
Source: SCB

=== Gävleborg ===
Location	Turnout	Share	Votes	S	M	FP	C	VPK	MP	KDS	Other	Left	Right
Bollnäs	83.6	9.6	17,916	48.1	9.1	10.4	16.8	6.9	5.3	3.0	0.5	60.3	36.3
Gävle	84.9	30.6	57,369	52.3	12.5	13.0	7.4	6.4	5.5	2.2	0.7	64.2	32.9
Hofors	86.2	4.2	7,951	63.3	6.6	6.2	7.8	10.7	3.7	1.0	0.8	77.7	20.6
Hudiksvall	82.7	12.6	23,658	44.7	8.5	8.2	20.0	8.2	6.6	3.5	0.2	59.5	36.8
Ljusdal	80.6	7.1	13,310	49.0	8.4	9.4	17.6	7.7	4.3	2.7	0.8	61.1	35.4
Nordanstig	83.7	3.9	7,310	43.5	6.1	7.2	25.0	6.5	6.6	5.2	0.0	56.6	38.2
Ockelbo	83.5	2.2	4,192	51.9	7.0	6.4	21.3	6.1	4.8	2.3	0.1	62.8	34.8
Ovanåker	86.9	4.8	8,910	43.5	7.3	9.4	25.5	3.3	5.1	5.9	0.1	51.9	42.2
Sandviken	87.4	14.4	26,910	58.1	9.6	8.5	9.7	7.4	3.8	2.1	0.8	69.3	27.8
Söderhamn	85.6	10.5	19,719	58.6	7.6	6.9	11.1	8.8	4.2	2.0	0.7	71.7	25.6
Total	84.6	3.5	187,245	51.9	9.6	9.7	13.2	7.2	5.1	2.7	0.6	64.2	32.5
Source: SCB

=== Halland ===
Location	Turnout	Share	Votes	S	M	FP	C	VPK	MP	KDS	Other	Left	Right
Falkenberg	87.4	14.8	23,337	38.3	16.0	9.6	25.3	2.9	5.7	2.1	0.1	46.8	50.9
Halmstad	86.9	32.2	50,730	44.2	19.4	13.1	11.0	4.3	5.8	1.9	0.3	54.3	43.5
Hylte	86.2	4.4	6,890	42.1	12.0	9.2	27.2	1.7	5.4	2.4	0.1	49.1	48.4
Kungsbacka	88.5	20.7	32,691	27.5	27.6	20.0	13.4	3.0	6.3	1.8	0.3	36.8	61.1
Laholm	85.9	8.7	13,666	32.2	18.3	9.4	30.0	2.5	5.6	1.9	0.1	40.3	57.7
Varberg	87.3	19.3	30,415	40.3	15.9	11.0	21.0	3.7	5.3	2.8	0.1	49.2	47.9
Total	87.3	2.9	157,729	38.0	19.5	13.1	17.9	3.4	5.7	2.1	0.2	47.1	50.5
Source: SCB

=== Jämtland ===
Location	Turnout	Share	Votes	S	M	FP	C	VPK	MP	KDS	Other	Left	Right
Berg	83.1	6.4	5,548	44.2	9.8	5.7	30.2	3.6	4.3	2.1	0.1	52.1	45.7
Bräcke	85.0	6.5	5,581	57.9	8.4	5.3	17.6	5.6	4.3	0.9	0.1	67.7	31.2
Härjedalen	81.1	9.3	8,007	56.8	9.1	7.5	14.1	6.1	4.9	1.3	0.2	67.8	30.7
Krokom	84.8	10.0	8,647	47.2	9.8	6.6	24.3	4.5	4.9	2.6	0.1	56.6	40.7
Ragunda	85.0	5.4	4,712	56.5	6.3	4.8	20.4	5.2	5.1	1.6	0.1	66.9	31.5
Strömsund	84.9	12.4	10,763	58.0	6.7	5.7	18.3	5.4	3.9	2.1	0.1	67.2	30.6
Åre	84.3	7.3	6,288	42.0	11.0	10.9	22.9	4.7	5.9	2.4	0.2	52.6	44.8
Östersund	84.5	42.7	36,967	47.1	13.0	11.4	14.9	6.1	5.4	2.0	0.1	58.5	39.3
Total	84.2	1.6	86,513	50.0	10.5	8.7	18.2	5.5	5.0	1.9	0.1	60.5	37.4
Source: SCB

=== Jönköping ===
Location	Turnout	Share	Votes	S	M	FP	C	VPK	MP	KDS	Other	Left	Right
Aneby	88.9	2.2	4,439	30.4	14.2	10.1	23.5	2.1	4.1	15.5	0.1	36.5	47.9
Eksjö	86.4	5.9	11,669	33.9	17.5	11.6	20.6	2.8	4.6	9.0	0.1	41.2	49.7
Gislaved	87.8	8.9	17,536	40.3	16.3	11.7	19.5	2.7	3.8	5.5	0.2	46.8	47.5
Gnosjö	88.7	2.9	5,719	34.2	17.3	13.4	13.9	3.2	3.3	14.4	0.2	40.8	44.6
Jönköping	88.0	36.4	71,859	42.2	16.7	12.2	9.0	4.1	4.1	11.0	0.7	50.3	38.0
Nässjö	88.6	10.5	20,766	45.3	14.2	9.6	15.2	3.3	3.0	9.1	0.2	51.6	39.0
Sävsjö	87.3	3.8	7,478	29.3	18.0	8.9	24.2	2.0	3.4	13.9	0.2	34.8	51.1
Tranås	87.3	6.1	11,995	44.9	16.3	10.7	11.1	3.4	3.9	9.5	0.1	52.2	38.2
Vaggeryd	89.9	4.0	7,873	40.5	14.8	9.0	15.3	4.1	2.5	13.7	0.2	47.0	39.1
Vetlanda	86.6	9.2	18,159	35.6	15.1	9.6	21.7	2.8	3.9	11.0	0.1	42.4	46.4
Värnamo	87.9	10.2	20,062	38.2	16.3	11.3	15.7	2.9	3.8	11.3	0.5	44.9	43.3
Total	87.9	3.7	197,555	40.0	16.2	11.2	14.5	3.4	3.8	10.6	0.4	47.1	41.9
Source: SCB

=== Kalmar ===
Location	Turnout	Share	Votes	S	M	FP	C	VPK	MP	KDS	Other	Left	Right
Borgholm	86.1	4.7	7,408	29.0	16.4	7.3	33.7	2.5	6.1	4.9	0.1	37.6	57.5
Emmaboda	88.9	4.6	7,193	47.9	11.7	6.1	22.9	3.8	4.6	2.8	0.3	56.2	40.6
Hultsfred	86.4	7.0	11,044	46.7	13.4	6.4	21.1	4.1	3.3	5.0	0.1	54.1	40.8
Högsby	87.5	3.1	4,862	45.1	12.6	6.2	22.0	5.1	4.0	4.8	0.1	54.3	40.8
Kalmar	86.2	23.3	36,434	45.9	19.6	10.2	11.8	4.5	4.8	2.8	0.3	55.2	41.6
Mönsterås	88.1	5.5	8,682	48.5	13.3	6.2	18.9	5.4	3.9	3.8	0.0	57.8	38.4
Mörbylånga	87.7	5.3	8,298	37.8	19.0	8.9	24.6	2.7	4.4	2.2	0.4	44.9	52.6
Nybro	87.0	8.7	13,704	47.5	13.3	7.0	20.0	4.5	3.7	3.8	0.2	55.7	40.3
Oskarshamn	86.9	11.4	17,819	49.8	15.6	9.0	11.0	5.4	3.8	5.3	0.1	58.9	35.6
Torsås	86.6	3.2	5,116	37.3	14.6	6.6	30.6	1.8	4.6	4.4	0.2	43.6	51.7
Vimmerby	86.7	6.6	10,394	39.4	15.4	6.2	28.2	3.3	4.0	3.4	0.1	46.6	49.8
Västervik	85.3	16.4	25,713	49.5	14.9	8.4	14.2	6.0	4.5	2.4	0.1	60.0	37.5
Total	86.6	2.9	156,667	45.4	15.9	8.1	18.1	4.5	4.3	3.5	0.2	54.2	42.1
Source: SCB

=== Kronoberg ===
Location	Turnout	Share	Votes	S	M	FP	C	VPK	MP	KDS	Other	Left	Right
Alvesta	86.7	11.0	12,288	40.5	16.3	7.5	22.8	3.8	4.7	4.2	0.2	49.1	46.5
Lessebo	90.0	5.1	5,757	55.4	11.3	6.7	11.6	8.6	4.2	2.3	0.0	68.2	29.5
Ljungby	85.4	15.3	17,158	39.0	15.0	8.7	22.3	3.9	5.8	5.2	0.1	48.8	45.9
Markaryd	84.6	6.0	6,778	45.2	14.9	7.8	17.6	4.0	5.2	5.2	0.1	54.3	40.3
Tingsryd	84.8	8.1	9,114	36.8	17.6	6.5	27.4	3.6	4.1	3.8	0.2	44.5	51.5
Uppvidinge	86.3	6.2	6,900	45.9	11.2	6.8	23.2	5.5	3.9	3.6	0.1	55.2	41.2
Växjö	87.2	39.2	43,966	39.1	20.0	11.9	14.3	5.3	5.8	3.5	0.2	50.2	46.2
Älmhult	86.8	9.0	10,133	44.0	17.2	7.7	18.5	3.3	5.3	3.8	0.1	52.7	43.4
Total	86.6	2.1	112,094	41.1	17.1	9.3	18.5	4.7	5.2	3.9	0.1	51.1	44.8
Source: SCB

=== Norrbotten ===
Location	Turnout	Share	Votes	S	M	FP	C	VPK	MP	KDS	Other	Left	Right
Arjeplog	82.4	1.5	2,449	48.9	5.4	8.1	12.7	16.6	5.0	2.8	0.5	70.5	26.1
Arvidsjaur	85.9	3.3	5,458	59.3	6.0	7.5	8.7	11.6	3.1	3.0	0.7	74.1	22.3
Boden	86.6	11.5	19,112	57.9	11.0	8.8	7.7	7.7	3.3	2.9	0.7	69.0	27.5
Gällivare	79.6	8.5	14,065	57.0	9.1	5.2	4.9	16.8	3.6	1.4	2.0	77.4	19.2
Haparanda	80.4	2.9	4,903	54.8	13.1	4.2	15.4	6.0	3.3	2.1	1.2	64.1	32.7
Jokkmokk	78.9	2.5	4,192	59.3	7.4	9.1	5.3	10.7	6.0	1.8	0.4	76.0	21.8
Kalix	86.8	7.4	12,371	64.6	7.0	6.1	9.9	6.3	3.4	1.5	1.3	74.2	23.0
Kiruna	79.1	9.2	15,308	60.7	7.3	6.3	3.7	16.2	2.9	1.7	1.2	79.8	17.3
Luleå	86.8	26.4	43,932	54.1	10.4	10.3	8.0	9.4	4.7	2.1	1.1	68.2	28.7
Pajala	81.9	3.2	5,341	51.1	8.1	5.2	9.7	18.4	2.1	2.9	2.6	71.5	23.0
Piteå	89.8	15.7	26,038	63.2	6.0	6.4	10.3	6.5	3.1	4.0	0.5	72.8	22.7
Älvsbyn	88.1	3.8	6,315	61.6	4.6	5.2	11.1	10.4	2.7	3.7	0.7	74.7	20.9
Överkalix	84.4	1.9	3,142	63.9	4.5	3.6	14.2	9.6	2.5	0.5	1.2	76.0	22.2
Övertorneå	83.8	2.2	3,617	48.6	9.2	5.1	20.2	10.9	2.1	2.5	1.3	61.7	34.5
Total	85.1	3.1	166,243	58.1	8.5	7.5	8.6	10.2	3.6	2.4	1.1	72.0	24.6
Source: SCB

=== Skåne ===
Skåne was divided into two separate counties at the time. Malmöhus was divided into Fyrstadskretsen (Four-city constituency) based around the Öresund urban areas and one covering the more rural parts of the county. Kristianstad County was one constituency for the whole county.

==== Kristianstad ====
Location	Turnout	Share	Votes	S	M	FP	C	VPK	MP	KDS	Other	Left	Right
Bromölla	86.4	4.3	7,649	65.1	9.9	7.0	6.8	5.0	4.7	1.3	0.1	74.8	23.8
Båstad	86.7	4.7	8,462	21.3	32.3	13.6	23.8	1.0	5.9	1.8	0.4	28.1	69.7
Hässleholm	85.2	17.4	31,207	40.3	19.6	10.0	17.6	2.9	5.1	4.0	0.4	48.3	47.2
Klippan	82.2	5.5	9,854	42.3	21.5	10.1	15.5	2.8	5.3	2.0	0.5	50.5	47.1
Kristianstad	85.5	25.5	45,811	46.3	20.1	12.5	10.6	3.1	5.3	1.9	0.2	54.7	43.1
Osby	84.5	4.8	8,632	47.4	14.9	9.1	16.1	3.5	4.7	4.1	0.3	55.6	40.0
Perstorp	84.3	2.4	4,388	47.1	19.1	10.3	12.8	2.0	4.8	2.6	1.3	53.9	42.2
Simrishamn	82.4	7.1	12,708	42.2	22.2	9.6	16.2	2.3	5.2	1.4	0.9	49.7	48.0
Tomelilla	82.0	4.3	7,635	38.6	21.7	7.6	23.8	1.7	4.6	1.6	0.4	45.0	53.1
Åstorp	83.8	4.1	7,414	51.0	20.8	8.4	10.7	2.5	3.9	2.0	0.6	57.5	39.9
Ängelholm	85.1	11.6	20,752	32.7	30.8	11.5	14.5	2.1	6.0	2.1	0.3	40.8	56.8
Örkelljunga	82.4	3.1	5,556	29.2	27.5	11.4	18.4	1.4	5.0	6.6	0.4	35.6	57.4
Östra Göinge	85.7	5.2	9,244	56.1	12.1	8.7	11.6	3.8	4.3	3.1	0.3	64.2	32.4
Total	84.7	3.3	179,312	42.7	21.3	10.6	14.6	2.8	5.2	2.6	0.4	50.6	46.4
Source: SCB

==== Malmö area ====
Four-city constituency (Swedish: Fyrstadskretsen)

Location	Turnout	Share	Votes	S	M	FP	C	VPK	MP	KDS	Other	Left	Right
Helsingborg	84.3	23.0	67,875	44.1	23.1	13.0	5.9	4.0	6.6	1.7	1.6	54.7	42.0
Landskrona	86.0	7.7	22,653	53.0	22.0	9.2	5.3	3.7	5.0	0.9	0.9	61.7	36.5
Lund	88.7	18.2	53,708	34.2	23.6	14.9	7.0	7.4	10.5	1.5	1.0	52.1	45.4
Malmö	85.8	51.2	151,439	45.9	26.7	10.1	3.2	4.2	5.3	1.3	3.1	55.0	40.1
Total	86.0	5.5	295,675	42.8	24.5	10.4	12.5	2.2	5.2	1.5	0.9	55.2	41.2
Source: SCB

==== Malmöhus ====
Location	Turnout	Share	Votes	S	M	FP	C	VPK	MP	KDS	Other	Left	Right
Bjuv	86.5	4.3	8,372	58.3	14.6	8.9	8.6	3.9	3.9	1.3	0.4	66.1	32.1
Burlöv	88.5	4.7	9,111	52.7	21.4	9.9	4.4	4.0	5.0	0.9	1.6	61.7	35.8
Eslöv	85.2	8.9	17,156	47.8	18.6	8.2	16.4	2.2	4.3	1.9	0.6	54.3	43.2
Höganäs	87.6	7.5	14,466	36.7	29.6	12.7	8.6	2.6	6.9	2.5	0.4	46.2	50.9
Hörby	83.8	4.2	8,152	31.1	19.0	12.0	26.8	1.6	4.5	4.2	0.8	37.2	57.8
Höör	84.4	3.8	7,356	33.7	24.2	11.3	18.6	1.8	7.2	2.5	0.7	42.7	54.1
Kävlinge	88.9	7.0	13,441	48.3	20.8	10.9	10.2	2.9	5.2	0.7	1.0	56.4	41.9
Lomma	91.7	5.8	11,168	34.0	34.2	15.3	6.6	1.9	5.9	1.1	1.0	41.8	56.1
Sjöbo	88.1	5.2	10,070	36.6	21.3	7.2	26.0	1.7	5.5	0.8	0.8	43.9	54.5
Skurup	85.6	4.1	7,953	41.3	20.5	9.0	20.4	1.8	4.9	1.1	1.0	48.0	49.8
Staffanstorp	90.9	5.7	11,020	38.4	29.3	12.9	9.8	1.8	5.5	1.1	1.2	45.7	52.1
Svalöv	86.7	4.1	7,849	43.4	18.8	7.9	19.6	2.1	4.9	1.7	1.6	50.4	46.3
Svedala	90.0	5.4	10,421	47.9	21.7	10.1	9.7	1.8	4.8	1.5	2.5	54.5	41.5
Trelleborg	86.4	11.6	22,271	54.1	18.9	7.8	9.4	2.5	5.0	1.2	0.9	61.7	36.2
Vellinge	92.0	9.0	17,404	26.9	45.3	12.9	6.5	1.0	5.0	1.3	0.9	33.0	64.8
Ystad	86.2	8.5	16,336	46.6	23.0	9.8	12.5	2.2	4.7	0.9	0.4	53.4	45.3
Total	86.6	3.6	192,546	42.8	24.5	10.4	12.5	2.2	5.2	1.5	0.9	50.2	47.4
Source: SCB

=== Stockholm ===
==== Stockholm (city) ====
Location	Turnout	Share	Votes	S	M	FP	C	VPK	MP	KDS	Other	Left	Right
Stockholm	84.7	100.0	432,490	33.6	27.6	14.5	4.2	10.3	6.9	1.8	1.1	50.8	46.3
Total	84.7	8.0	432,490	33.6	27.6	14.5	4.2	10.3	6.9	1.8	1.1	50.8	46.3
Source: SCB

==== Stockholm County ====
Location	Turnout	Share	Votes	S	M	FP	C	VPK	MP	KDS	Other	Left	Right
Botkyrka	82.8	5.9	32,532	42.7	20.2	14.2	6.0	8.1	5.9	1.8	1.1	56.6	40.4
Danderyd	92.0	3.5	19,247	14.9	53.1	18.3	4.0	2.4	5.4	1.6	0.3	22.7	75.4
Ekerö	89.5	2.0	10,902	26.7	31.6	18.8	9.1	4.7	7.1	1.7	0.2	38.5	59.6
Haninge	84.4	6.1	33,686	41.9	20.5	15.6	6.2	7.5	5.9	1.6	0.8	55.3	42.3
Huddinge	84.9	7.2	40,217	37.7	24.7	15.6	5.5	7.8	6.0	1.8	0.9	51.5	45.8
Järfälla	88.3	6.1	34,152	37.9	25.2	17.4	4.8	6.1	5.5	2.2	0.9	49.5	47.4
Lidingö	89.7	4.6	25,573	19.7	44.4	19.8	4.6	3.9	6.1	1.2	0.3	29.6	68.8
Nacka	87.0	6.5	36,293	30.4	32.6	17.0	4.2	7.0	6.1	1.4	1.2	43.6	53.8
Norrtälje	85.0	5.0	27,530	41.6	18.3	11.1	16.6	5.1	5.2	1.9	0.2	51.9	46.0
Nynäshamn	87.1	2.4	13,619	48.7	15.4	11.7	7.6	7.5	7.0	1.9	0.3	63.2	34.7
Salem	86.9	1.2	6,901	34.8	27.4	16.4	6.1	6.3	6.3	2.5	0.3	47.3	49.9
Sigtuna	84.5	3.1	17,230	39.9	24.5	14.7	8.2	5.6	5.0	1.7	0.2	50.6	47.4
Sollentuna	88.3	5.4	30,276	31.0	29.6	18.2	5.8	5.7	6.6	2.6	0.5	43.3	53.5
Solna	83.5	6.3	34,961	34.5	29.4	15.3	4.4	8.0	5.8	1.7	0.9	48.3	49.0
Sundbyberg	84.2	3.5	19,428	43.5	20.1	14.0	4.2	9.7	5.9	1.6	1.2	59.0	38.3
Södertälje	83.0	8.0	44,563	43.7	18.3	14.0	7.7	6.8	6.5	1.8	1.1	57.1	40.0
Tyresö	88.0	3.5	19,597	36.0	26.1	16.6	5.2	7.6	6.0	1.8	0.7	49.5	48.0
Täby	90.1	6.2	34,603	22.7	40.4	20.1	5.3	3.7	5.6	1.6	0.6	32.0	65.7
Upplands-Bro	86.3	2.0	10,972	42.5	21.9	14.7	6.6	6.6	5.1	2.4	0.2	54.3	43.2
Upplands Väsby	85.4	3.5	19,221	40.6	22.7	16.1	5.6	6.4	6.3	1.7	0.6	53.3	44.4
Vallentuna	87.5	2.2	12,105	29.1	30.8	15.4	9.8	4.8	7.2	2.3	0.6	41.1	56.0
Vaxholm	88.9	0.8	4,243	30.8	30.2	17.6	7.1	5.4	7.5	1.2	0.2	43.8	54.9
Värmdö	86.8	2.2	11,956	38.5	26.6	13.8	6.2	7.2	5.8	1.3	0.5	51.5	46.7
Österåker	87.4	2.9	16,278	31.9	30.6	17.7	6.8	5.1	6.3	1.2	0.5	43.2	55.1
Total	86.3	10.3	556,085	35.4	27.4	16.0	6.3	6.4	6.0	1.8	0.7	47.7	49.8
Source: SCB

=== Södermanland ===
Location	Turnout	Share	Votes	S	M	FP	C	VPK	MP	KDS	Other	Left	Right
Eskilstuna	85.0	34.2	54,494	52.3	14.1	13.3	7.4	4.9	4.5	2.3	0.2	61.7	34.8
Flen	87.3	6.8	10,821	50.2	13.2	9.3	14.3	5.0	5.2	2.3	0.4	60.4	36.8
Katrineholm	87.8	13.2	20,978	52.8	12.7	9.9	11.4	4.2	5.0	3.4	0.6	62.0	34.0
Nyköping	87.8	26.6	42,503	46.1	17.9	11.3	11.9	4.4	5.7	2.3	0.4	56.2	41.1
Oxelösund	87.1	5.1	8,181	58.7	11.5	9.0	5.1	9.0	5.1	1.1	0.6	72.8	25.6
Strängnäs	86.7	10.2	16,263	40.9	20.8	16.6	9.9	4.4	5.2	1.9	0.4	50.4	47.3
Vingåker	87.9	3.9	6,287	50.7	10.7	10.2	14.5	4.1	6.3	3.2	0.3	61.1	35.4
Total	86.7	3.0	159,527	49.7	15.3	12.0	10.0	4.8	5.1	2.4	0.7	59.6	37.3
Source: SCB

=== Uppsala ===
Location	Turnout	Share	Votes	S	M	FP	C	VPK	MP	KDS	Other	Left	Right
Enköping	84.5	12.9	20,725	41.9	17.8	11.7	18.4	3.4	4.3	1.7	0.9	49.6	47.9
Håbo	86.9	5.1	8,160	39.1	28.6	13.7	7.9	4.6	4.1	1.5	0.5	47.7	50.3
Tierp	87.7	8.3	13,264	54.9	8.0	8.7	19.0	3.0	3.4	2.2	0.8	61.3	35.7
Uppsala	86.5	62.0	99,551	36.5	20.4	15.5	10.0	7.6	6.8	2.2	1.1	50.9	45.9
Älvkarleby	88.4	3.8	6,096	68.4	6.3	8.4	5.9	6.3	3.2	1.1	0.3	77.9	20.6
Östhammar	84.5	8.0	12,879	46.0	13.3	9.5	19.5	4.8	4.2	1.7	1.0	55.0	42.3
Total	86.3	3.0	160,675	40.8	18.4	13.6	12.3	6.2	5.7	2.0	1.0	52.7	44.3
Source: SCB

=== Värmland ===
Location	Turnout	Share	Votes	S	M	FP	C	VPK	MP	KDS	Other	Left	Right
Arvika	83.1	9.3	16,992	46.7	13.1	10.9	15.4	6.2	5.7	1.9	0.1	58.6	39.4
Eda	83.8	3.0	5,530	52.5	10.6	7.1	19.9	4.5	3.6	1.7	0.1	60.6	37.6
Filipstad	84.6	4.9	8,915	62.0	10.9	7.8	7.3	6.6	4.2	1.2	0.1	72.7	26.0
Forshaga	87.1	4.0	7,326	57.1	11.1	9.4	11.7	4.5	4.1	2.0	0.2	65.7	32.2
Grums	84.7	3.5	6,442	58.9	9.4	6.5	13.8	6.1	3.8	1.4	0.1	68.8	29.7
Hagfors	88.5	6.3	11,412	63.6	7.6	4.4	11.4	8.0	3.6	1.3	0.0	75.3	23.4
Hammarö	89.8	4.7	8,596	55.0	15.6	11.3	6.7	6.1	4.3	0.9	0.1	65.4	33.6
Karlstad	85.8	27.5	50,120	44.4	20.1	12.6	10.4	5.2	5.2	1.8	0.2	54.9	43.1
Kil	86.4	4.0	7,226	44.3	16.5	12.0	15.8	4.4	5.2	1.8	0.1	53.9	44.2
Kristinehamn	85.3	9.3	17,040	50.5	13.7	12.7	10.5	6.1	4.3	2.1	0.1	60.9	36.9
Munkfors	88.8	1.9	3,412	68.9	5.6	5.9	9.8	5.5	2.8	1.2	0.2	77.2	21.4
Storfors	88.3	1.9	3,400	58.6	11.4	7.1	11.9	5.7	3.6	1.5	0.1	68.0	30.4
Sunne	84.8	4.8	8,833	36.6	16.1	9.4	29.7	2.3	4.0	1.9	0.1	42.9	55.2
Säffle	83.6	6.4	11,631	42.9	14.8	9.6	22.0	3.8	4.0	2.8	0.1	50.7	46.3
Torsby	84.8	5.5	9,945	50.6	13.3	6.5	16.8	7.0	4.2	1.5	0.1	61.9	36.6
Årjäng	77.8	3.1	5,607	30.5	14.0	10.3	33.9	2.4	4.5	4.4	0.1	37.3	58.1
Total	85.3	3.4	182,427	49.2	14.7	10.1	14.1	5.4	4.6	1.8	0.1	59.1	38.9
Source: SCB

=== Västerbotten ===
Location	Turnout	Share	Votes	S	M	FP	C	VPK	MP	KDS	Other	Left	Right
Bjurholm	87.6	1.3	2,082	37.1	13.3	18.3	21.1	1.2	2.7	6.0	0.2	41.1	52.7
Dorotea	83.9	1.6	2,492	57.1	4.9	8.8	17.6	6.2	3.4	2.0	0.0	66.7	31.3
Lycksele	85.9	5.7	9,072	52.0	8.2	12.3	9.4	5.6	2.9	9.1	0.3	60.6	30.0
Malå	85.6	1.7	2,662	55.3	6.2	13.0	9.5	7.1	2.8	5.7	0.4	65.2	28.8
Nordmaling	88.3	3.3	5,233	46.7	10.8	9.3	21.1	3.1	2.9	6.0	0.1	52.7	41.2
Norsjö	83.9	2.2	3,485	50.0	6.0	12.4	17.2	5.9	2.6	4.8	1.1	58.5	35.6
Robertsfors	87.5	3.1	4,967	37.3	7.9	10.5	31.5	3.6	3.4	5.6	0.2	44.3	49.9
Skellefteå	86.5	30.5	48,522	52.9	7.2	10.9	14.3	5.4	3.5	5.0	0.7	61.8	32.4
Sorsele	81.2	1.5	2,312	46.0	8.8	10.5	16.0	4.0	4.6	9.5	0.7	54.5	35.2
Storuman	81.3	3.1	4,962	45.8	11.7	13.3	11.5	3.6	4.8	8.9	0.2	54.3	36.5
Umeå	87.0	35.0	55,714	44.8	10.8	13.4	11.6	7.6	6.6	4.0	1.1	59.1	35.8
Vilhelmina	83.4	3.4	5,380	53.1	5.6	12.1	13.1	5.1	4.4	6.3	0.2	62.7	30.8
Vindeln	85.3	2.7	4,252	38.3	11.1	14.2	22.2	2.7	4.5	6.7	0.3	45.5	47.5
Vännäs	86.8	3.3	5,276	46.9	7.9	9.2	21.0	5.5	3.7	5.5	0.4	56.1	38.0
Åsele	86.2	1.8	2,893	57.9	5.5	7.7	16.8	3.7	3.5	4.7	0.2	65.1	30.0
Total	86.6	3.0	159,304	48.4	8.9	12.0	14.3	5.9	4.6	5.2	0.7	58.9	35.2
Source: SCB

=== Västernorrland ===
Location	Turnout	Share	Votes	S	M	FP	C	VPK	MP	KDS	Other	Left	Right
Härnösand	85.9	10.4	18,031	42.5	14.1	9.6	18.2	6.2	6.4	2.8	0.1	55.2	41.9
Kramfors	88.4	9.9	17,246	53.6	7.7	4.4	18.2	7.5	5.0	2.9	0.7	66.1	30.3
Sollefteå	88.1	9.9	17,246	58.8	7.9	4.9	13.7	6.0	6.1	2.6	0.1	70.9	26.5
Sundsvall	85.6	35.2	61,022	49.8	11.1	11.4	12.1	6.4	4.9	3.2	1.1	61.2	34.6
Timrå	86.3	6.9	11,998	59.0	5.6	7.8	12.5	8.4	3.6	2.9	0.2	71.1	25.9
Ånge	84.6	4.9	8,507	53.1	6.4	5.7	18.8	7.4	5.7	2.7	0.2	66.2	31.0
Örnsköldsvik	87.7	22.8	39,518	52.1	7.7	9.2	16.7	3.5	4.7	5.8	0.4	60.2	33.6
Total	86.6	3.2	173,568	51.6	9.4	8.8	14.9	6.0	5.1	3.6	0.6	62.7	33.1
Source: SCB

=== Västmanland ===
Location	Turnout	Share	Votes	S	M	FP	C	VPK	MP	KDS	Other	Left	Right
Arboga	85.5	5.9	9,321	50.3	14.2	10.5	11.2	5.4	4.9	2.5	1.1	60.6	35.8
Fagersta	86.3	5.6	8,939	61.9	10.6	8.6	6.4	6.0	4.1	1.1	1.3	72.0	25.6
Hallstahammar	85.7	6.4	10,231	59.2	10.6	9.3	6.7	8.0	3.1	1.6	1.4	70.3	26.6
Heby	85.2	5.2	8,275	43.5	9.2	8.0	26.6	5.4	3.8	3.2	0.3	52.7	43.8
Kungsör	87.5	3.3	5,247	48.5	12.3	12.1	13.0	5.7	5.9	1.9	0.7	60.1	37.3
Köping	84.4	10.2	16,156	52.5	10.8	9.9	10.7	6.9	4.8	2.6	1.9	64.2	31.4
Norberg	87.3	2.6	4,142	58.0	10.0	6.8	8.3	10.0	4.7	1.0	1.1	72.7	25.1
Sala	85.1	8.5	13,561	41.4	13.5	12.1	20.1	4.7	5.1	2.9	0.2	51.2	45.8
Skinnskatteberg	85.0	2.0	3,161	61.0	8.6	5.8	11.2	6.9	4.6	1.4	0.5	72.5	25.6
Surahammar	86.5	4.2	6,601	64.2	7.9	8.6	5.2	8.1	3.7	1.9	0.4	76.0	21.7
Västerås	84.3	46.1	73,114	47.2	17.5	16.3	6.3	5.1	4.6	2.3	0.8	56.9	40.0
Total	85.0	3.0	158,748	50.2	14.0	12.7	9.6	5.8	4.5	2.3	0.9	60.5	36.4
Source: SCB

=== Västra Götaland ===
Västra Götaland did have three different counties at the time. Those were Göteborg och Bohuslän, Skaraborg and Älvsborg. There were five constituencies, namely two for Göteborg och Bohuslän, one for Skaraborg and two for Älvsborg.

==== Bohuslän ====
Location	Turnout	Share	Votes	S	M	FP	C	VPK	MP	KDS	Other	Left	Right
Härryda	87.6	8.3	15,648	35.1	19.9	19.1	10.1	5.6	7.5	2.3	0.4	48.2	49.1
Kungälv	88.4	11.1	20,958	38.6	18.4	15.4	12.9	4.6	6.6	3.1	0.5	49.8	46.6
Lysekil	86.9	5.2	9,737	52.3	13.1	14.7	7.2	4.5	5.6	2.4	0.3	62.4	35.9
Munkedal	84.1	3.6	6,745	39.8	13.4	10.9	23.6	3.2	5.3	3.5	0.3	48.3	47.9
Mölndal	87.2	17.3	32,467	39.0	17.8	18.7	7.6	6.9	6.3	2.9	0.8	52.3	44.1
Orust	84.9	4.4	8,262	36.0	16.4	15.6	18.8	3.6	6.8	2.4	0.4	46.4	50.7
Partille	87.4	10.1	18,990	35.7	20.5	20.0	6.0	7.0	7.1	3.3	0.5	49.8	46.5
Sotenäs	85.6	3.3	6,130	44.3	15.7	16.7	10.5	3.8	5.6	3.4	0.1	53.7	42.9
Stenungsund	86.0	5.8	10,833	38.5	18.3	16.7	13.1	4.1	6.3	2.7	0.3	48.9	48.0
Strömstad	82.1	3.2	6,040	42.6	14.2	13.4	17.0	3.2	7.0	2.5	0.2	52.7	44.6
Tanum	82.3	3.8	7,138	28.0	18.4	16.1	25.5	2.2	7.6	1.9	0.4	37.8	59.9
Tjörn	84.9	4.3	8,089	27.4	20.2	23.3	10.1	2.8	6.9	9.2	0.1	37.1	53.6
Uddevalla	85.5	16.1	30,277	47.3	14.3	12.3	11.3	4.8	5.9	3.1	0.9	58.1	37.9
Öckerö	87.8	3.5	6,657	30.0	23.8	16.9	5.1	3.2	7.3	13.7	0.0	40.5	45.8
Total	86.3	3.5	187,971	39.2	17.5	16.5	11.3	5.0	6.5	3.5	0.5	50.7	45.3
Source: SCB

==== Gothenburg ====
Location	Turnout	Share	Votes	S	M	FP	C	VPK	MP	KDS	Other	Left	Right
Gothenburg	84.6	100.0	271,974	37.1	20.3	17.0	4.8	9.0	7.8	2.6	1.3	54.0	42.1
Total	84.6	5.1	271,974	37.1	20.3	17.0	4.8	9.0	7.8	2.6	1.3	54.0	42.1
Source: SCB

==== Skaraborg ====
Location	Turnout	Share	Votes	S	M	FP	C	VPK	MP	KDS	Other	Left	Right
Essunga	86.1	2.1	3,742	26.8	22.2	10.2	30.9	2.5	4.3	2.9	0.1	33.7	63.3
Falköping	86.8	12.0	21,035	36.9	16.9	10.3	23.2	3.6	4.5	4.6	0.1	45.0	50.3
Grästorp	86.3	2.2	3,813	29.6	21.2	10.8	28.1	2.4	5.0	2.7	0.1	37.0	60.2
Gullspång	84.8	2.3	4,041	44.7	14.9	8.4	19.9	3.8	4.9	3.2	0.1	53.4	43.3
Götene	87.8	4.8	8,371	40.4	15.2	12.3	17.5	3.8	4.7	6.2	0.0	48.9	44.9
Habo	88.4	3.0	5,320	34.2	18.8	13.6	14.9	2.5	4.4	11.6	0.0	41.1	47.3
Hjo	86.9	3.3	5,807	39.6	19.3	12.0	15.3	3.4	4.5	5.9	0.1	47.4	46.5
Karlsborg	89.2	3.1	5,491	45.8	15.0	11.2	16.4	3.0	5.4	3.0	0.1	54.2	42.7
Lidköping	86.0	13.2	23,063	43.5	14.8	12.1	15.2	5.5	5.0	3.8	0.1	54.0	42.0
Mariestad	84.6	9.0	15,732	43.6	16.9	12.2	13.2	4.9	5.3	3.6	0.3	53.8	42.3
Mullsjö	90.0	2.5	4,292	34.9	16.7	11.3	15.6	3.2	5.2	12.9	0.2	43.3	43.6
Skara	86.5	6.8	11,866	42.4	17.7	11.4	15.6	3.5	6.1	3.0	0.2	52.1	44.7
Skövde	86.2	16.8	29,447	43.2	17.1	13.0	13.2	4.7	5.0	3.7	0.2	52.9	43.3
Tibro	86.6	4.0	7,053	43.3	13.3	15.4	14.7	3.9	4.2	5.1	0.1	51.4	43.4
Tidaholm	88.0	5.0	8,694	49.1	12.9	9.8	16.4	3.8	4.0	3.6	0.4	56.9	39.1
Töreboda	82.8	3.7	6,398	38.5	16.3	8.3	25.1	3.6	4.8	3.4	0.1	46.8	49.6
Vara	85.7	6.2	10,836	29.4	22.7	9.8	28.6	2.1	4.5	2.9	0.1	35.9	61.1
Total	86.4	3.3	175,001	40.5	16.8	11.6	17.8	4.0	4.9	4.3	0.2	49.3	46.2
Source: SCB

==== Älvsborg N ====
Location	Turnout	Share	Votes	S	M	FP	C	VPK	MP	KDS	Other	Left	Right
Ale	87.4	8.9	14,266	46.5	12.9	12.1	12.7	6.1	6.2	2.9	0.6	58.8	37.7
Alingsås	88.1	13.0	20,833	37.7	16.6	16.0	12.4	5.1	6.7	5.2	0.2	49.5	45.1
Bengtsfors	84.9	4.7	7,593	45.0	11.5	9.8	21.3	3.8	5.1	3.5	0.1	53.9	42.6
Dals-Ed	82.3	2.0	3,222	30.0	12.6	10.5	32.2	2.4	7.0	5.2	0.2	39.4	55.2
Färgelanda	86.2	2.9	4,688	38.6	12.4	9.0	30.0	2.2	5.5	2.2	0.0	46.3	51.4
Herrljunga	89.2	3.9	6,269	30.4	16.4	11.2	28.0	3.3	5.7	4.8	0.1	39.4	55.6
Lerum	89.5	12.3	19,688	32.2	21.3	20.3	9.6	5.3	8.0	3.1	0.2	45.4	51.3
Lilla Edet	85.7	4.6	7,344	48.5	10.6	9.4	16.2	6.2	6.1	2.7	0.3	60.8	36.2
Mellerud	84.6	4.2	6,716	34.5	15.1	9.4	28.2	2.1	6.2	4.3	0.2	42.9	52.6
Trollhättan	86.0	19.8	31,716	52.3	13.0	11.9	9.0	5.7	5.7	2.2	0.2	63.8	33.8
Vårgårda	88.7	3.9	6,247	27.8	16.9	13.8	25.2	2.7	5.4	7.8	0.4	35.9	55.9
Vänersborg	85.5	14.5	23,357	41.6	15.7	12.9	14.7	5.4	6.6	2.9	0.2	53.6	43.3
Åmål	84.2	5.4	8,606	47.8	14.6	9.6	17.2	4.0	4.3	2.6	0.0	56.1	41.3
Total	86.7	3.0	160,545	41.7	15.1	13.1	15.3	4.9	6.2	3.5	0.2	52.8	43.5
Source: SCB

==== Älvsborg S ====
Location	Turnout	Share	Votes	S	M	FP	C	VPK	MP	KDS	Other	Left	Right
Borås	87.6	56.5	65,681	45.4	19.1	12.0	10.0	4.6	5.0	3.8	0.1	55.0	41.2
Mark	88.7	17.9	20,829	46.3	14.8	8.4	17.8	4.2	5.1	3.3	0.1	55.7	41.0
Svenljunga	87.0	6.1	7,042	35.6	18.3	10.2	24.6	2.4	5.6	3.2	0.0	43.7	53.1
Tranemo	90.0	6.8	7,930	40.5	15.8	9.7	24.6	2.4	4.6	2.3	0.1	47.5	50.1
Ulricehamn	88.0	12.6	14,691	33.3	18.7	12.4	23.7	2.0	5.5	4.3	0.2	40.8	54.7
Total	88.0	2.2	116,173	43.1	18.0	11.2	15.0	3.9	5.1	3.6	0.1	52.1	44.2
Source: SCB

=== Örebro ===
Location	Turnout	Share	Votes	S	M	FP	C	VPK	MP	KDS	Other	Left	Right
Askersund	86.9	4.3	7,651	49.8	12.2	9.2	16.5	4.0	3.5	4.8	0.1	57.3	37.9
Degerfors	90.1	4.4	7,767	63.7	6.3	6.8	8.2	8.8	3.4	2.5	0.3	75.8	21.3
Hallsberg	87.7	6.1	10,778	53.0	9.6	9.5	13.7	6.5	4.0	3.3	0.3	63.4	32.9
Hällefors	84.0	3.5	6,076	63.7	7.6	6.7	6.9	9.2	4.6	1.3	0.0	77.5	21.2
Karlskoga	86.8	13.0	22,951	55.5	14.3	11.4	6.1	7.3	2.8	2.2	0.4	65.7	31.8
Kumla	87.3	6.6	11,624	50.0	10.8	11.3	12.7	6.0	3.6	5.2	0.2	59.4	34.9
Laxå	85.2	2.8	4,922	56.2	8.1	9.3	11.4	6.1	4.1	4.8	0.1	66.3	28.8
Lindesberg	85.4	8.9	15,627	47.8	11.2	9.7	16.7	5.5	5.2	3.8	0.1	58.4	37.6
Ljusnarsberg	83.0	2.3	4,082	56.4	8.2	7.8	9.9	9.7	5.4	2.4	0.1	71.5	26.0
Nora	85.5	3.6	6,327	49.3	12.6	11.7	10.9	5.8	5.9	3.5	0.3	61.1	35.1
Örebro	86.5	44.4	78,201	43.2	15.0	15.3	10.1	6.4	5.0	3.9	1.1	54.6	40.4
Total	86.5	3.3	176,006	49.0	12.8	12.3	10.7	6.6	4.4	3.6	0.6	60.0	35.8
Source: SCB

=== Östergötland ===
Location	Turnout	Share	Votes	S	M	FP	C	VPK	MP	KDS	Other	Left	Right
Boxholm	88.8	1.5	3,748	55.2	8.2	5.3	17.9	6.0	3.9	3.3	0.1	65.1	31.4
Finspång	88.5	5.9	15,190	56.1	10.5	8.4	10.3	5.5	4.9	4.1	0.2	66.5	29.2
Kinda	87.1	2.6	6,619	36.6	14.3	9.3	26.4	2.8	4.4	6.1	0.2	43.8	50.0
Linköping	87.6	30.8	79,151	40.6	20.1	12.9	10.4	5.5	5.9	4.0	0.7	51.9	43.4
Mjölby	86.2	6.5	16,565	48.8	14.4	9.6	15.4	4.6	3.3	3.7	0.2	56.7	39.4
Motala	86.5	10.4	26,610	52.9	12.4	11.2	10.3	5.3	4.8	2.9	0.2	63.0	33.9
Norrköping	84.4	29.2	75,015	46.7	20.2	11.0	8.2	5.7	5.2	2.7	0.3	57.6	39.4
Söderköping	86.3	3.1	7,933	36.3	18.9	9.8	21.7	3.1	6.9	3.3	0.1	46.3	50.4
Vadstena	88.4	2.0	5,096	44.2	18.8	10.1	15.0	3.3	4.8	3.7	0.1	52.3	43.9
Valdemarsvik	87.3	2.2	5,684	47.7	14.7	6.9	20.8	3.3	4.0	2.5	0.1	55.0	42.3
Ydre	88.6	1.1	2,828	28.5	13.2	12.0	30.0	2.2	6.0	8.1	0.1	36.7	55.1
Åtvidaberg	89.1	3.3	8,409	54.5	11.6	7.9	15.1	2.7	4.4	3.6	0.1	61.6	34.6
Ödeshög	88.4	1.5	3,887	39.4	14.9	7.9	22.8	2.9	4.2	7.8	0.1	46.5	45.6
Total	86.5	4.8	256,735	45.6	17.5	10.9	11.8	5.1	5.2	3.6	0.4	55.9	40.2
Source: SCB
