= Moskosel =

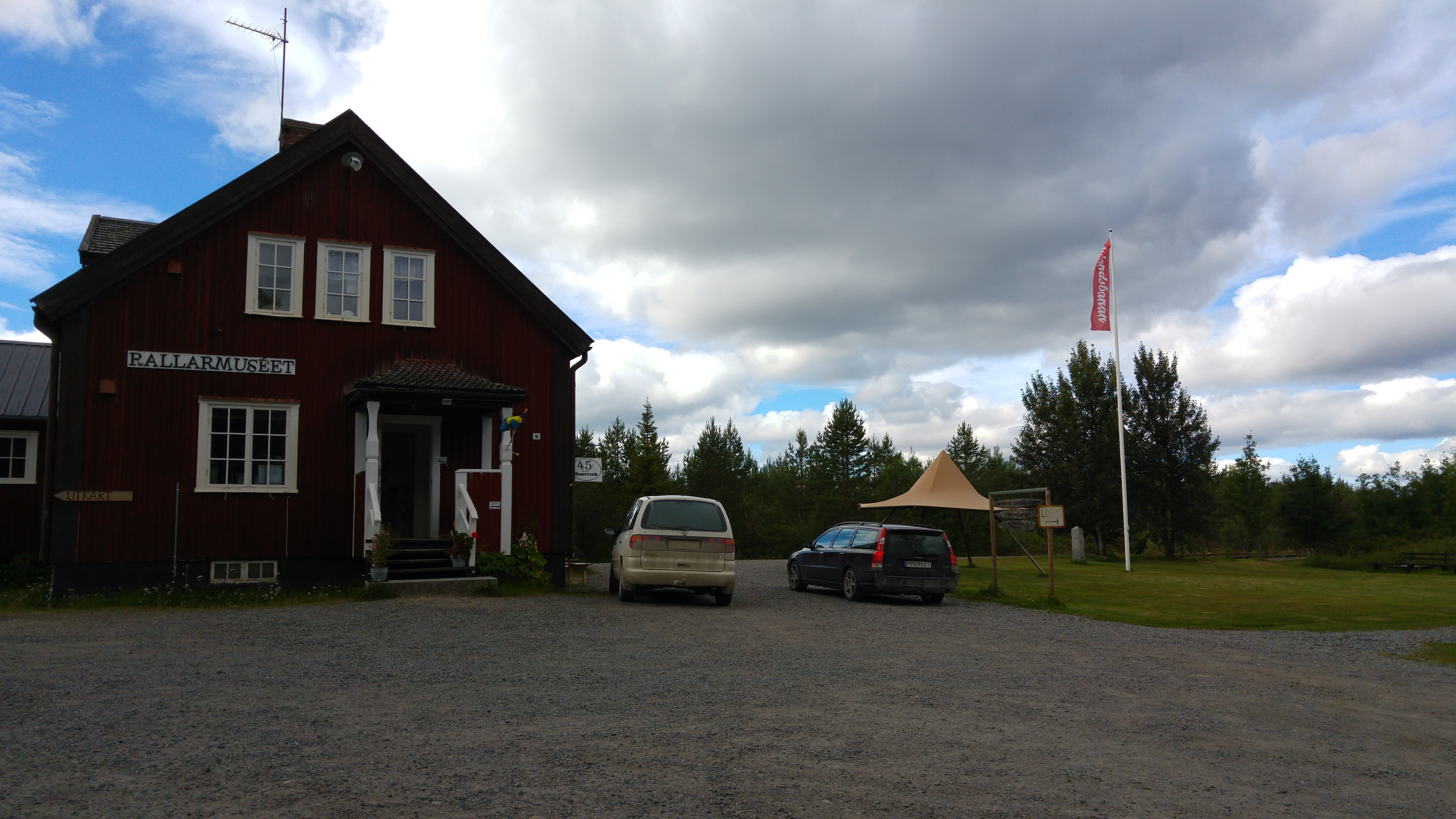
- Rail Museum

- Location within Norrbotten Location within Sweden
- Coordinates: 65°52′N 19°25′E
- Country: Sweden
- Province: Lapland
- County: Norrbotten County
- Municipality: Arvidsjaur Municipality

Area
  - Total: 0.92 km^{2} (0.36 sq mi)

Population (31 December 2010)
  - Total: 232
  - Density: 253/km^{2} (660/sq mi)
- Time zone: UTC+1 (CET)
  - Summer (DST): UTC+2 (CEST)

Moskosel (Swedish pronunciation: [ˈmɔ̌sːkʊseːl]) is a locality situated in Arvidsjaur Municipality, Norrbotten County, Sweden, with 232 inhabitants in 2010.
