= Arvidsjaur Municipality =

Arvidsjaur Municipality Arvidsjaurs kommun
- Municipality
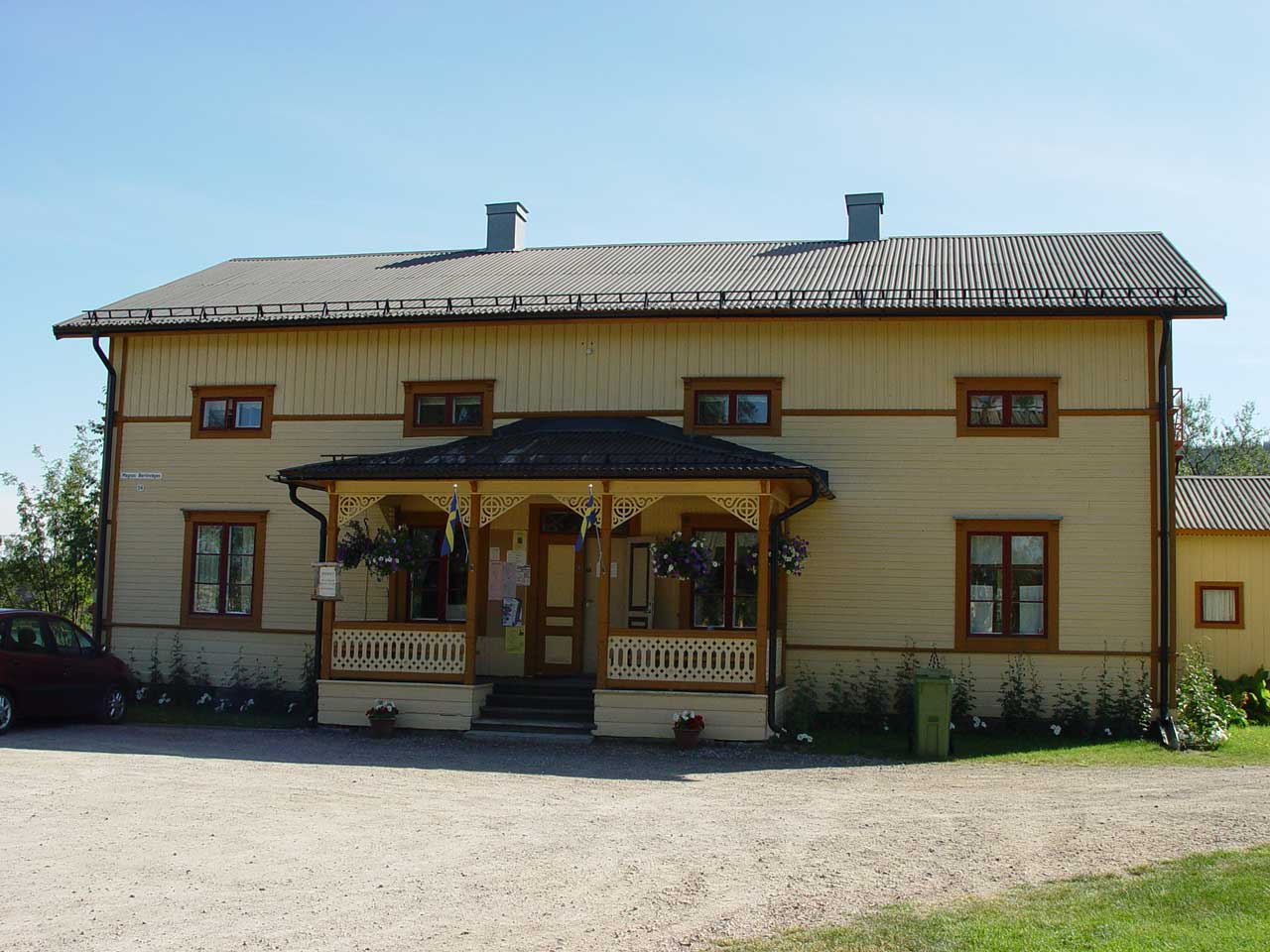
- Arvidsjuar Museum

- Coat of arms

- Coordinates: 65°35′N 19°07′E
- Country: Sweden
- County: Norrbotten County
- Seat: Arvidsjaur

Area
  - Total: 6,126.32 km^{2} (2,365.39 sq mi)
  - Land: 5,655.97 km^{2} (2,183.78 sq mi)
  - Water: 470.35 km^{2} (181.60 sq mi)
- Area as of 1 January 2014.

Population (30 June 2025)
  - Total: 6,053
  - Density: 1.070/km^{2} (2.772/sq mi)
- Time zone: UTC+1 (CET)
  - Summer (DST): UTC+2 (CEST)
- ISO 3166 code: SE
- Province: Lapland
- Municipal code: 2505
- Website: www.arvidsjaur.se

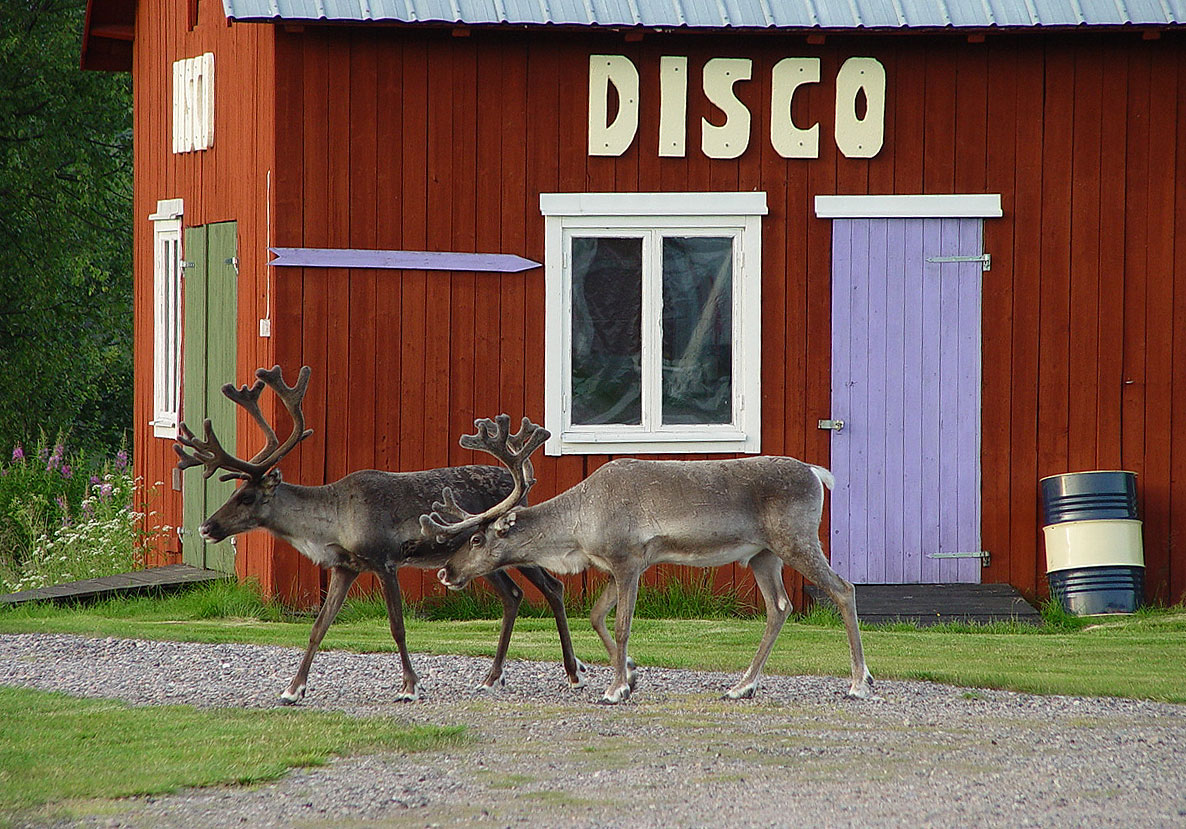
Reindeer outside a disco.

Arvidsjaur Municipality (Swedish: Arvidsjaurs kommun; Ume Sami: Árviesjávrrien kommuvdna) is a municipality in Norrbotten County in northern Sweden. Its seat is Arvidsjaur.

== History ==
Arvidsjaur Municipality was for a long time inhabited only by the Sami people. They were back then a hunting people, living off the abundance of fish and wildlife in the area. Archaeological discoveries suggest that people have been moving through the area for several thousands of years. The name Arvidsjaur itself comes from a Sami word which means "generous water" and was originally the name of the adjacent lake.

In the 14th and 15th century some farmers settled in the area. They acquired furs and skins from the hunters, and traded them off to southern regions, allegedly in vast numbers.

The Christianization of Arvidsjaur Municipality was slow, as it was in Norrland as a whole, because of the low population, the harsh climate and the long distances. It was also commonly believed that Norrland was inhabited by magicians.

Not until 1577 did the first settler, Per Käck, settle in Arvidsjaur. The settlers built the first chapel at the marketplace at the time, in 1560. The first church was inaugurated in 1604.

The Swedish minister and missionary Petrus Læstadius (1802–1841; brother of Lars Levi Læstadius, founder of the largest Christian revival movement in Norrland) collected old stories and myths in the area in the 19th century, which create the basis for our knowledge from that time.

== Geography ==
Arvidsjaur Municipality is located about 110 kilometres south of the Arctic Circle, in the center of the northernmost land, Norrland. It is also part of the geographic area Lapland, which consists of the northern parts of Sweden, Norway and Finland. Sami people are an indigenous minority group who mainly live on breeding reindeer. Arvidsjaur Municipality still contains several Sami villages, and as a tribute to the Sami people a reindeer is the basis for the municipal coat of arms.

=== Localities ===
There are three localities (or urban areas) in Arvidsjaur Municipality:

#	Locality	Population
1	**Arvidsjaur**	4,644
2	Glommersträsk	306
3	Moskosel	299

The municipal seat in bold

== Demographics ==
This is a demographic table based on Arvidsjaur Municipality's electoral districts in the 2022 Swedish general election sourced from SVT's election platform, in turn taken from SCB official statistics.

Residents include everyone registered as living in the district, regardless of age or citizenship status. Valid voters indicate Swedish citizens above the age of 18 who therefore can vote in general elections. Left vote and right vote indicate the result between the two major blocs in said district in the 2022 general election. Employment indicates the share of people between the ages of 20 and 64 who are working taxpayers. Foreign background is defined as residents either born abroad or with two parents born outside of Sweden. Median income is the received monthly income through either employment, capital gains or social grants for the median adult above 20, also including pensioners in Swedish kronor. The section about college graduates indicates any degree accumulated after high school.

In total there were 6,139 residents, including 4,772 Swedish citizens of voting age. 56.0 % voted for the left coalition and 43.1 % for the right coalition.

Location	Residents	Valid voters	Left vote	Right vote	Employed	SV parents	1st/2nd gen	Income	College
Location			%	%	%	%	%		%
Arvidsjaur N	2,221	1,674	51.0	47.7	81	87	13	24,629	29
Arvidsjaur V	1,957	1,593	63.8	35.5	80	89	11	22,811	26
Arvidsjaur Ö	1,961	1,505	55.0	44.3	86	92	8	26,142	25
Source: SVT

== Elections ==
=== Riksdag ===
These are the results of the elections to the Riksdag since the 1972 municipal reform. Norrbotten Party also contested the 1994 election but due to the party's small size at a nationwide level SCB did not publish the party's results at a municipal level. The same applies to the Sweden Democrats between 1988 and 1998. "Turnout" denotes the percentage of eligible voters casting any ballots, whereas "Votes" denotes the number of actual valid ballots cast.

Year	Turnout	Votes	V	S	MP	C	L	KD	M	SD	ND	NP/SP
1973	90.3	5,512	15.8	51.4	0.0	18.5	5.9	2.1	5.4	0.0	0.0	0.0
1976	90.3	5,604	13.5	53.7	0.0	19.1	6.2	2.5	4.3	0.0	0.0	0.0
1979	90.5	5,704	11.5	56.3	0.0	15.6	6.4	2.7	5.6	0.0	0.0	0.0
1982	90.6	5,872	11.0	58.9	0.5	13.0	3.8	2.7	8.2	0.0	0.0	0.0
1985	90.1	5,836	10.8	60.1	0.5	11.9	8.4	0.0	8.0	0.0	0.0	0.0
1988	85.9	5,458	11.6	59.3	3.1	8.7	7.5	3.0	6.0	0.0	0.0	0.0
1991	85.0	5,331	9.7	55.9	1.1	9.3	6.3	5.1	9.0	0.0	3.0	0.0
1994	87.0	5,390	12.1	62.0	2.8	6.5	3.9	2.7	8.8	0.0	0.3	0.0
1998	82.0	4,807	24.6	49.2	2.7	5.4	3.2	5.5	8.4	0.0	0.0	0.0
2002	79.1	4,425	14.5	53.8	1.8	7.4	5.4	4.3	5.0	0.0	0.0	6.5
2006	81.9	4,438	12.5	57.5	1.7	7.5	3.9	2.1	10.5	1.0	0.0	1.6
2010	84.1	4,411	11.1	54.0	2.6	7.2	4.1	2.0	13.4	4.5	0.0	0.0
2014	85.0	4,326	10.2	52.1	1.6	6.2	3.1	1.8	10.1	13.1	0.0	0.0

Blocs

This lists the relative strength of the socialist and centre-right blocs since 1973, but parties not elected to the Riksdag are inserted as "other", including the Sweden Democrats results from 1988 to 2006, but also the Christian Democrats pre-1991 and the Greens in 1982, 1985 and 1991. The sources are identical to the table above. The coalition or government mandate marked in bold formed the government after the election. New Democracy got elected in 1991 but are still listed as "other" due to the short lifespan of the party.

Year	Turnout	Votes	Left	Right	SD	Other	Elected
1973	90.3	5,512	**67.2**	29.8	0.0	3.0	97.0
1976	90.3	5,604	67.2	**29.6**	0.0	3.2	96.8
1979	90.5	5,704	67.8	**27.6**	0.0	4.6	95.4
1982	90.6	5,872	**69.9**	25.0	0.0	5.1	94.9
1985	90.1	5,836	**70.9**	28.3	0.0	0.9	99.1
1988	85.9	5,458	**74.0**	22.2	0.0	3.8	96.2
1991	85.0	5,331	65.6	**29.7**	0.0	4.7	98.1
1994	87.0	5,390	**76.9**	21.9	0.0	1.2	98.8
1998	82.0	4,807	**76.5**	22.5	0.0	1.0	99.0
2002	79.1	4,425	**70.1**	22.1	0.0	7.8	92.2
2006	81.9	4,438	71.7	**24.0**	0.0	4.3	95.7
2010	84.1	4,411	67.7	**26.7**	4.5	1.1	98.9
2014	85.0	4,326	**63.9**	21.2	13.1	1.8	98.2
