= 2002 Swedish local elections =

2002 elections for local governments in Sweden

Local elections were held in Sweden on Sunday 15 September 2002 to elect county councils and municipal councils. The elections were held alongside general elections.

== Results ==
=== County council elections ===
Party	Votes	%	Seats	+/–
Swedish Social Democratic Party	2,011,334	38.48	682	+49
Moderate Party	867,804	16.60	253	−84
Liberal People's Party	629,287	12.04	187	+93
Left Party	438,136	8.38	145	−42
Christian Democrats	428,804	8.20	141	−27
Centre Party	365,128	6.98	139	+16
Green Party	204,169	3.91	55	-15
Swedish Senior Citizen Interest Party	52,888	1.01	3	-1
Health Care Party of Norrbotten	35,593	0.68	17	+6
Health Care Party - Will of the People	33,108	0.63	6	+0
Sweden Democrats	29,511	0.56	0	+0
Health Care Party in Värmland	28,611	0.55	15	+15
Skånes Väl	18,927	0.36	0	-6
Health Care Party Gävleborg	11,320	0.22	5	+5
Health Care Party – Västernorrland	9,836	0.19	5	-2
Scania Party	9,073	0.17	0	-
National Democrats	7,609	0.15	0	-
Skaraborg Party	7,442	0.14	0	-
Communist Party	5,645	0.11	0	-
Socialist Justice Party (Note: contested with the ballot name Rättvisepartiet Offensiv in Västerbotten.)	4,934	0.09	0	+0
People's Campaign for Health Care	3,479	0.07	0	-
Health Care Party in Jämtland	3,432	0.07	3	+3
Abolish the County Council	3,168	0.06	0	-
Socialist Party	1,720	0.03	0	-
Länsbytarpartiet	1,333	0.03	0	-
Communist – APK	1,375	0.03	0	-
Health Care Party of Uppland	756	0.01	0	-
Pensionist Party in Göteborg	395	0.01	0	+0
Norrland Party	296	0.01	0	-
Citizens Party	178	0.00	0	-
Skåne Federalists	169	0.00	0	-
Welfare Party	144	0.00	0	-
Alliance Party	137	0.00	0	-
Communist League	50	0.00	0	-
Parties with fewer than 50 votes	11,585	0.22	0	–
Total	5,227,376	100.00	1,656	0
Valid votes	5,227,376	97.82		
Invalid/blank votes	116,585	2.18		
Total votes	5,343,961	100.00		
Registered voters/turnout	6,897,911	77.47		
Source: Val.se

=== Municipal elections ===
Party	Leader	Votes	%	+/–	Seats	+/–
Social Democrats	Göran Persson	1982703	37.3	+2.2	5155	+206
Moderate	Bo Lundgren	932621	17.5	−4.8	2059	−529
Liberals	Lars Leijonborg	609411	11.4	+5.5	1259	+552
Christian Democrats	Alf Svensson	376657	7.0	−0.9	1013	−56
Centre	Maud Olofsson	458274	8.6	+0.4	1689	+121
Left	Gudrun Schyman	437788	8.2	−2.0	1045	−292
Green	Maria Wetterstrand and Peter Eriksson	227189	4.2	-0.5	443	-116
SPI-Senior Citizens	Kerstin Koistinen	51801	1.0	*	75	*
Sweden Democrats	Mikael Jansson	47704	0.9	*	49	*
Communist	Andreas Carlsson	10923	0.2	*	11	*
Stockholm Party	Stella Fare	9137	0.2	*	0	-3
Health Care Party of Norrbotten		8769	0.2	*	27	+9
National Democrats	Anders Steen	7477	0.1	+0.1	4	+4
Skåne Party	Carl P. Herslow	6480	0.1	*	3	+0
Socialist Justice		5956	0.1	*	5	+3
Kiruna Party	Lars Törnman	4510	0.1	*	15	-1
Vägvalet		4225	0.1	+0.1	6	+6
Sjöbo Party		4161	0.1	*	13	+1
SAFE		2960	0.1	+0	10	+0
Mariestad Party		2949	0.1	+0.1	10	+10
Health Care Party - Will of the People		2947	0.1	*	0	*
Lidingö Party		2633	0.0	*	5	-1
Falu Party		2441	0.0	*	5	-1
Popular Will		2249	0.0	*	5	-7
Sollentuna Party		2192	0.0	+0	4	+0
Socialist Party		2186	0.0	*	1	*
Drevviken Party		2140	0.0	+0	3	+0
Botkyrka Party		2132	0.0	*	3	-2
Huddinge Party		2037	0.0	*	2	-3
Folkets Väl		1979	0.0	*	5	+2
Alternative 2000		1969	0.0	*	9	+1
Berg Party		1959	0.0	+0	16	+16
Linköping Party		1900	0.0	+0	0	+0
Social List Active Politics		1695	0.0	+0	4	+1
Nykvarn Party		1638	0.0	+0	12	+5
Ale Democrats		1578	0.0	+0	5	-2
Alvesta Alternative		1483	0.0	+0	6	-1
Länsbytarpartiet		1476	0.0	+0	9	+5
Municipal Party Our Future		1439	0.0	+0	17	+7
Health Care Party of Skåne		1370	0.0	*	4	*
Markbygdspartiet		1434	0.0	+0	2	+0
Kommunens Väl		1317	0.0	+0	7	-4
Axel Ingmar's List - Avesta Party		1308	0.0	+0	4	-1
Communist - APK	Rolf Hagel	1307	0.0	+0	3	*
Alternative		1301	0.0	+0	4	+0
Copper Party		1299	0.0	-	8	+8
Pensionist Party in Södertälje		1256	0.0	+0	2	+1
Bjäre Party		1214	0.0	+0	6	+2
Municipal Party VDM		1209	0.0	+0	4	+3
Centrist Collaboration in Håbo		1190	0.0	-	5	+5
Health Care Party - Västernorrland		1110	0.0	+0	4	-3
Bopartiet		1092	0.0	+0	3	-1
Österlenpartiet Simrishamn		1089	0.0	-	5	+5
BARA-Partiet		1074	0.0	+0	4	-2
Burlövs Väl		1055	0.0	+0	5	+2
Municipal Alternative		1044	0.0	+0	5	+2
Kommunens Bästa - Ölandspartiet		1016	0.0	-	6	+6
Västerhaninge-Tungelsta Party		1044	0.0	+0	1	-1
Care Party in Arboga		867	0.0	-	4	+4
Knivsta.nu		840	0.0	-	4	+4
Bålsta Party		809	0.0	+0	3	+0
Independents of Hällefors		783	0.0	+0	6	+0
Gotland Party Future of Gotland		756	0.0	+0	0	-3
Future of the Municipality		742	0.0	-	3	+3
Independent Democrats of Lindesberg		722	0.0	+0	2	-1
Voice of the People - VOX humana		721	0.0	+0	5	+0
Health Care Party in Jämtland		712	0.0	-	0	-
Hörby Party		709	0.0	+0	4	+0
Staffantorp Party		707	0.0	-	2	+2
Municipal List of Dorotea		699	0.0	+0	11	-3
Göingepartiet Kommunal Samling		686	0.0	+0	4	-2
Österåker Party		686	0.0	+0	2	+0
Åhus Party		680	0.0	+0	1	-1
Road to Life Quality		662	0.0	-	4	+4
Environmental and Left List in Tanum		624	0.0	-	4	+4
Bevara Österåker		163	0.0	-	1	+1
Ronneby Party		592	0.0	+0	2	-1
Vimmerby Party		592	0.0	-	3	+3
Samhällets Bästa		578	0.0	+0	3	+0
Frihetliga Ljusdalsbygden		551	0.0	-	2	+2
Storforsbygdens Väl		536	0.0	+0	7	+1
New Municipal Party of Svenljunga		530	0.0	+0	3	-3
Demokratiska Särlistan		524	0.0	+0	3	-2
Norrköping Party		519	0.0	-	0	-
Pensionist Party in Nynäshamn		519	0.0	-	2	+2
Progress Party		510	0.0	+0	2	+0
Alternative		501	0.0	+0	5	-4
Alliance Party		494	0.0	+0	2	+0
Rejuvenation Party		486	0.0	-	2	+2
Future of Götene		481	0.0	+0	3	+0
Hedemora Party		474	0.0	-	2	+2
Solidarity and Cooperation		473	0.0	-	2	+2
Sölvesborg Party		472	0.0	+0	2	+1
Sigtuna Party		466	0.0	-	1	+1
New Sotenäs Party		461	0.0	+0	3	-1
Hela Edas Lista		449	0.0	-	4	+4
Future Party (Sweden)		420	0.0	+0	3	+1
Strängnäs Party		416	0.0	-	1	+1
Action for the Municipality of Sigtuna		411	0.0	-	1	+1
Särna List		408	0.0	-	3	+3
Mora Party		399	0.0	+0	1	-1
Åtvidaberg Party		392	0.0	+0	2	-4
Popular Will on Orust		389	0.0	+0	2	-1
Laholm Party		382	0.0	-	1	+1
Folkhemmet i Hofors-Torsåker		379	0.0	-	2	+2
Norrland Party		375	0.0	-	0	-
Future of Mullsjö		374	0.0	-	3	+3
Pensionist Party in Göteborg		373	0.0	*	0	+0
Kommunala Rättspartiet Tyresö		367	0.0	+0	0	-1
Municipal Unity		366	0.0	+0	2	+0
Leksand Party		360	0.0	+0	2	+0
People in Focus		358	0.0	+0	2	-1
Åsele Party		355	0.0	+0	5	-2
Älvdalen Party		354	0.0	+0	3	-2
Sala Party		342	0.0	+0	1	-2
Citizens Party		324	0.0	+0	2	+0
Independent Party of Ljusnarsberg		321	0.0	+0	3	-3
Övertorneå Alternative		303	0.0	+0	4	-2
S-Alternative		292	0.0	+0	2	-2
Lysekilspartiet.nu		289	0.0	-	1	+1
Bergas Bästa		288	0.0	-	1	+1
Health Care Party of Uppland		286	0.0	-	0	-
Citizens Party of Grums		285	0.0	-	2	+2
Edsberg Party		280	0.0	-	0	-
Ystad Party		272	0.0	+0	1	+0
Libertarian Municipal People		265	0.0	+0	2	-2
DemoEx		261	0.0	-	1	+1
Political Forum		250	0.0	*	0	*
Free Trade Party of Norrbotten		248	0.0	-	2	+2
Bjärred-Lommas Väl		246	0.0	+0	1	-1
Rotpartiet		234	0.0	+0	1	-2
Bamsepartiet		230	0.0	*	0	*
Tidaholms Väl		229	0.0	+0	1	-2
Framtid Väsby		224	0.0	-	0	-
Alliance for Disabled		215	0.0	-	0	-
Kalix Party		215	0.0	+0	1	-2
Karlstad Party		212	0.0	+0	0	-3
Samernas Väl		209	0.0	+0	2	+0
National Socialist Front		208	0.0	-	0	-
Workers List		205	0.0	+0	1	+0
Eslöv Party		205	0.0	+0	0	-2
Student Political Party of Gotland		195	0.0	-	0	-
Åstorp Party		195	0.0	+0	1	+0
Väner Democrats		176	0.0	-	0	-
Municipal Inhabitants in Cooperation		173	0.0	+0	1	-2
Leisure Time Party		172	0.0	+0	0	-1
Youth List		168	0.0	-	1	+1
Fram för Kommunen		164	0.0	+0	2	-1
Centrum Democrats - Kommunens Väl		158	0.0	-	1	+1
Nynäshamn Party		158	0.0	-	0	-
Free Democrats of Arjeplog		157	0.0	+0	3	-1
Swedish Socialists of Skaraborg		154	0.0	-	0	-
Free Norrland		149	0.0	+0	1	+0
Welfare Party		147	0.0	-	0	-
Vindelkommunal demokrati		143	0.0	+0	1	-4
National Democratic Party of Sweden		111	0.00	-	0	-
Umeå Campus		108	0.0	-	0	-
Generation Party		101	0.0	-	0	-
Life Quality in Högsby		93	0.0	-	1	+1
New Alternative		81	0.0	-	0	-
Centre		79	0.0	-	0	-
Gnesta Party		74	0.0	-	0	-
Gävle Party		73	0.0	+0	0	+0
Sami Party		58	0.0	+0	1	+0
Municipal Party		51	0.0	*	0	*
Parties with fewer than 50 votes		661	0.0	*	0	*
Valid votes			100.00			
Invalid votes		96830				
Total		5410101 (79.9 %)				
