= List of political parties in Sweden =

This article lists political parties in Sweden.

Sweden has a multi-party system with numerous political parties, in which parties often have a smaller chance of gaining power alone, and in the event a majority is not reached, can choose to work with each other to form coalition governments.

== National parties ==
The letter(s) after each Swedish party name are the abbreviations commonly used in the Swedish media.

=== Parties with official representation ===
Parties with representation in the Riksdag and/or European Parliament:

Party	Abbr.	Leader	Ideology	Political position	EP group	MPs	MEPs	Municipality
Social Democratic Party; Socialdemokratiska arbetarpartiet	S	Magdalena Andersson	Social democracy	Centre-left	S&D	99 / 349	5 / 21	3,771 / 12,614
Moderate Party; Moderata samlingspartiet	M	Ulf Kristersson	Liberal conservatism	Centre-right	EPP	70 / 349	4 / 21	2,584 / 12,614
Sweden Democrats; Sverigedemokraterna	SD	Jimmie Åkesson	National conservatism; Right-wing populism	Right-wing to far-right	ECR	62 / 349	3 / 21	2,091 / 12,614
Left Party; Vänsterpartiet	V	Nooshi Dadgostar	Eco-socialism	Left-wing	The Left	30 / 349	2 / 21	811 / 12,614
Centre Party; Centerpartiet	C	Elisabeth Thand Ringqvist	Liberalism; Agrarianism (Nordic)	Centre to centre-right	Renew	25 / 349	2 / 21	1,213 / 12,614
Christian Democrats; Kristdemokraterna	KD	Ebba Busch	Christian democracy; Conservatism	Right-wing	EPP	22 / 349	1 / 21	755 / 12,614
Green Party; Miljöpartiet de Gröna	MP	Daniel Helldén; Amanda Lind	Green politics; Ecofeminism	Centre-left	Greens/EFA	22 / 349	3 / 21	309 / 12,614
Liberals; Liberalerna	L	Simona Mohamsson	Conservative liberalism	Centre-right	Renew	19 / 349	1 / 21	509 / 12,614

- According to a threshold rule, any one particular party must receive at least 4% of the votes to be allocated a seat in the Riksdag.
- Any party having broken the 1% threshold in the last two European Parliament or Riksdag elections respectively will have their ballots printed and distributed by the authorities.

=== Minor parties ===
Party	Abbr.	Leader	Ideology	Political position	EP group
Alternative for Sweden; Alternativ för Sverige	AFS	Gustav Kasselstrand	Ultranationalism; Anti-immigration	Far-right	NI
Ambition Sweden; Ambition Sverige	AS	Elsa Widding	Climate change denial; Anti-immigration; Hard Euroscepticism	Far-right	NI
Christian Values Party; Kristna Värdepartiet	KVP	Mats Selander	Christian right Anti-abortion movements	Right-wing	ECPP
Citizens' Coalition; Medborgerlig Samling	MED	Daniel Sonesson	Liberal conservatism Anti-immigration	Right-wing	NI
Classical Liberal Party; Klassiskt liberala partiet	KLP	Magnus Jönsson	Classical liberalism Libertarianism	Right-wing	NI
Climate Alliance; Klimatalliansen		Gudrun Schyman; K. G. Hammar	Environmentalism		NI
Communist Party; Kommunistiska partiet	K	Povel Johansson	Communism; Marxism–Leninism Maoism	Far-left	NI
Communist Party of Sweden; Sveriges kommunistiska parti	SKP	Andreas Sörensen	Communism; Marxism–Leninism	Far-left	ECA
Direct Democrats; Direktdemokraterna	DD		Direct democracy	Big tent	NI
Animals' Party; Djurens parti	DP	Simon Knutsson	Animal rights	Single-issue	NI
European Workers Party; Europeiska arbetarpartiet	EAP	Kjell Lundqvist	LaRouchism	Far-right	NI
Feminist Initiative; Feministiskt initiativ	FI	Agnes Lundgren; Luis Lineo	Feminism	Left-wing	S&D
Future Left; Framtidens Vänster	FV	Daniel Riazat; Lorena Delgado Varas	Anti-capitalism; Socialism	Left-wing	NI
Health Care Party; Sjukvårdspartiet	SVP	Kenneth Backgård	Single-issue party	Single-issue	NI
Human Rights and Democracy; Mänskliga rättigheter och Demokrati	MoD	Gustaf Rydelius	Direct-democracy; Vaccine hesitancy	Big tent	NI
Independent Rural Party; Landsbygdspartiet Oberoende	LPo	Benneth Thyr	Agrarianism	Big tent	NI
Liberal Initiative; Liberalt initiativ	LI	Malin Sjöberg Högrell	Social liberalism	Centre	NI
Nordic Resistance Movement; Nordiska motståndsrörelsen	NMR	Fredrik Vejdeland	Neo-Nazism	Far-right	NI
Nuance Party; Partiet Nyans	PN	Mikail Yüksel	Islamism	Populism	FPP
Pirate Party; Piratpartiet	PP	Mikael Enmalm	Pirate politics	Syncretic	PPEU
Revolutionary Communist Party; Revolutionära kommunistiska partiet	RKP		Communism; Trotskyism	Far-left	NI
Socialist Alternative; Socialistiskt Alternativ	SAV	Collective leadership	Socialism; Trotskyism	Left-wing	NI
Turning Point Party; Partiet Vändpunkt	PV	Gunnar Brundin; Paula Dahlberg	Deliberative Democracy	Syncretic	NI
Unity; Enhet		Vide Geiger	Spiritual politics; Environmentalism	Left-wing	NI
Unity Party; Enighetspartiet		Jamal El-Haj	Multiculturalism; Pro-immigration	Left-wing	NI
Volt Sweden; Volt Sverige	Volt	Aaron Benzinger	Social liberalism; European federalism	Syncretic	Volt
Workers' Party; Arbetarpartiet		Jan Hägglund	Democratic socialism; Marxism	Left-wing	NI
Örebro Party; Örebropartiet	ÖP	Markus Allard	Nationalism; Populism; Left-wing nationalism	Syncretic	NI

=== Defunct and historical parties ===
- Caps (Mössorna, 18th century)
- Hats (Hattarna, 18th century)
- Junker Party (1850s)
- Social Democratic Left Party of Sweden (Sveriges Socialdemokratiska Vänsterparti, 1921–1923)
- Communist Party of Sweden – Höglund Faction (Sveriges Kommunistiska Parti, 1924–1926)
- Socialist Party (Socialistiska Partiet, 1929–1948)
- Clerical People's Party (Kyrkliga Folkpartiet, 1930s)
- National Socialist Workers’ Party (Nationalsocialistiska Arbetarpartiet, 1933–1945)
- Swedish Socialist Party (Svenska socialistiska partiet), a Swedish Nazi party, 1943-1948
- Left Socialist Party (Vänstersocialistiska Partiet, 1940–1963)
- Revolutionary Socialist Party (Revolutionära Socialistiska Partiet, 1950–1951)
- Communist Labour League of Sweden (Sveriges Kommunistiska Arbetareförbund, 1956–1967)
- Communist League Marxist-Leninists/Communist Party of Sweden/Solidarity Party (Kommunistiska Förbundet Marxist-Leninisterna/Sveriges Kommunistiska Parti/Solidaritetspartiet, 1967-199?)
- Progress Party (Framstegspartiet, existed in various forms between 1968 and 2000)
- Marxist–Leninist Struggle League (Marxist-Leninistiska Kampförbundet, 1970–1981)
- Centre Democrats (Centrumdemokraterna, 1974–2006)
- Communist Unity Groups (Kommunistiska Enhetsgrupperna, 1975–1977)
- Communist Workers' League of Sweden (Sveriges Kommunistiska Arbetarförbund, 1977–?)
- Communist Party of Sweden (marxist-leninists)/Communist Workers Party of Sweden (Sveriges Kommunistiska Parti (marxist-leninisterna)/Sveriges Kommunistiska Arbetarparti, 1980–1993)
- Communist Party in Sweden (Kommunistiska Partiet i Sverige, 1982–1993)
- Socialist Workers' Party of Sweden (Sveriges socialistiska arbetarparti, 1980s-1991)
- The Marxists (Marxisterna, 1990s)
- Workers' List/People's Democrats (sv) (Arbetarlistan/Folkdemokraterna, 1990–2002)
- New Democracy (Ny Demokrati, 1991–2000)
  - Alliance Party (Allianspartiet, 199X–2006)
- Natural Law Party (Partiet för naturens lag, 1992–2004)
- Gottland Party Gotland's Future (Gottlandspartiet Gotlands framtid, 1993–2006)
- New Future (Ny Framtid, 1993–2006)
- The New Party (Det nya partiet, 1998)
- National Democrats (Nationaldemokraterna, 2001–2014)
- Party of the Swedes (Svenskarnas Parti, 2008–2015)
- Revolutionary Workers' League of Sweden (Sveriges Revolutionära Arbetarförbund, 1975–1983)
- Unique Party (Unika partiet, 2006)
- Communist League (Kommunistiska Förbundet, 1980–2010)
- Liquor Party (Spritpartiet, 2009–2010)
- Socialist Party (Socialistiska Partiet, 1971–present) - as of 2019, the Socialist Party actively encourages its members to vote for the Left Party.
- June List (Junilistan, 2004–2014) – Represented in the European Parliament 2004–2009. Did not participate in the 2019 election.
- Popular Democrats

=== Joke parties ===
- Donald Duck Party
- Mjölbypartiet

== Regional and local parties ==
The following is a list of Swedish political parties on the local (municipal and regional) levels.

County	Party	Campaigns for			Notes
County	Party	Municipalities	County	Riksdag	Notes
Blekinge	Ronneby Party; Ronnebypartiet	Ronneby	No	No	
Blekinge	SoL Party Sölvesborg and Lister; SoL-partiet Sölvesborg och Lister	Sölvesborg	No	No	
Dalarna	Health Care Party; Sjukvårdspartiet	—N/a	Yes	No	
Dalarna	Independent Rural Party; Landsbygdspartiet oberoende	Malung-Sälen; Vansbro	No	Yes	
Dalarna	Nordic Resistance Movement; Nordiska motståndsrörelsen	—N/a	Yes	Yes	
Dalarna	Countryside Party; Bygdepartiet	Leksand	No	No	
Dalarna	Falu Party; Falupartiet	Falun	No	No	
Dalarna	Omsorg för Alla	Borlänge	No	No	
Dalarna	Hedemora Party; Hedemorapartiet	Hedemora	No	No	
Dalarna	Libertarian Municipal People; Frihetliga Ljusdalsbygden	Älvdalen	No	No	Defunct
Dalarna	Mora Party; Morapartiet	Mora	No	No	
Dalarna	Municipal List; Kommunlistan	Avesta	No	No	
Dalarna	Municipal List; Kommunlistan	Älvdalen	No	No	Defunct
Dalarna	Popular Movement for the Good of Borlänge; Folkrörelsen för Borlänges Bästa	Borlänge	No	No	
Dalarna	Residential Party; Bopartiet	Ludvika	No	No	Defunct
Dalarna	Youth List; Ungdomslistan	Hedemora	No	No	Defunct
Gävleborg	Health Care Party; Sjukvårdspartiet	—N/a	Yes	No	
Gävleborg	People's Home in Hofors-Torsåker; Folkhemmet i Hofors-Torsåker	Hofors	No	No	
Halland	Citizens' Coalition; Medborgerlig samling	Laholm	Yes	Yes	
Halland	Laholm Party; Laholmspartiet	Laholm	No	No	
Halland	Social List Active Politics; Samhällslistan Aktiv Politik	Falkenberg	No	No	Defunct
Jämtland	Independent Rural Party; Landsbygdspartiet oberoende	Härjedalen	No	Yes	
Jämtland	Berg Party; Bergspartiet	Berg	No	No	Defunct
Jämtland	Fair Democracy; Rättvis Demokrati	Strömsund	No	No	
Jämtland	VOX Humana; Folkets röst – VOX humana	Härjedalen	No	No	
Jönköping	Cooperation in Mullsjö; Samverkan i Mullsjö	Mullsjö	No	No	
Jönköping	Future of Mullsjö; Mullsjös framtid	—N/a	No	No	
Jönköping	Solidarity - Work - Peace - Ecology; Solidaritet – Arbete – Fred – Ekologi	Nässjö	No	No	
Kalmar	Citizens' Coalition; Medborgerlig samling	Torsås	Yes	Yes	
Kalmar	Citizens Party: School - Health Care - Care; Medborgarpartiet: skola – vård – omsorg	Hultsfred	No	No	
Kalmar	Life Quality in the Municipality of Högsby; Livskvalitet i Högsby Kommun	Högsby	No	No	Defunct
Kalmar	Vimmerby Party; Vimmerbypartiet	Vimmerby	No	No	Defunct
Kronoberg	Independent Rural Party; Landsbygdspartiet oberoende	Uppvidinge	No	Yes	
Kronoberg	Alternative; Alternativet	Ljungby	No	No	
Kronoberg	Alvesta Alternative; Alvesta Alternativet	Alvesta	No	No	
Kronoberg	Bergas Bästa – partipolitiskt obunden lista	Ljungby	No	No	Defunct
Kronoberg	Future Party; Framtidspartiet	Tingsryd	No	No	Defunct
Kronoberg	Libertarian Municipal People; Frihetliga Ljusdalsbygden	Ljusdal	No	No	Defunct
Norrbotten	Health Care Party; Sjukvårdspartiet	—N/a	Yes	No	
Norrbotten	Independent Rural Party; Landsbygdspartiet oberoende	Luleå	No	Yes	
Norrbotten	Socialist Alternative; Socialistiskt Alternativ	Luleå	Yes	Yes	
Norrbotten	Free Democrats of Arjeplog; Arjeplogs Fria Demokrater	Arjeplog	No	No	Defunct
Norrbotten	Free Norrland; Fria Norrland	Åre	No	No	
Norrbotten	Free Trade Party of Norrbotten; Norrbottens Frihandelsparti	Haparanda	No	No	
Norrbotten	Kiruna Party; Kirunapartiet	Kiruna	No	No	
Scania	Citizens' Coalition; Medborgerlig samling	Höör	Yes	Yes	
Scania	Swedish Senior Citizen Interest Party; SPI - Välfärden	Hörby	Yes	No	
Scania	Förnyalund	Lund	No	No	
Södermanland	Vård för pengarna	—N/a	Yes	No	
Stockholm	Botkyrka Party; Botkyrkapartiet	Botkyrka	No	No	
Stockholm	Drevviken Party; Drevvikenpartiet	Huddinge	No	No	
Stockholm	The Island Party; Öpartiet	Ekerö	No	No	
Stockholm	Leisure Time Party; Fritidspartiet	Vallentuna	No	No	Defunct
Stockholm	Lidingö Party; Lidingöpartiet	Lidingö	No	No	
Stockholm	Stockholm Party; Stockholmspartiet	Stockholm	No	No	
Uppsala	Health Care Party; Sjukvårdspartiet	—N/a	Yes	No	
Uppsala	Stop E4 West - Culture Party; Stoppa E4 Väst – Kulturpartiet	Uppsala	No	No	Defunct
Västerbotten	Åsele Party; Åselepartiet	Åsele	No	No	
Västernorrland	Health Care Party; Sjukvårdspartiet	—N/a	Yes	No	
Västra Götaland	Democrats; Demokraterna	Gothenburg	Yes	No	
Västra Götaland	Independent Rural Party; Landsbygdspartiet oberoende	Svenljunga	No	Yes	
Västra Götaland	Crossroads; Vägvalet	Borås	No	No	Defunct
Västra Götaland	Uddevalla Party; Uddevallapartiet	Uddevalla	No	No	
Örebro	Independent Rural Party; Landsbygdspartiet oberoende	Askersund; Lindesberg; Nora	No	Yes	
Örebro	Örebro Party; Örebropartiet	Örebro	Yes	Yes	
Östergötland	Independent Rural Party; Landsbygdspartiet oberoende	Kinda; Valdemarsvik; Söderköping	No	Yes	

== See also ==
- Alliance (Sweden) - centre-right liberal-conservative political party alliances
- Regions of Sweden
- European Parliament
- European Union
- Red-Greens (Sweden) - centre-left to left-wing political party alliances
- Liberalism and centrism in Sweden
- List of ruling political parties by country
- List of Swedish politicians
- Municipalities of Sweden
- Politics of Sweden
