= 1994 Stockholm municipal election =

Swedish local election

The Stockholm municipal election of 1994 was held on 18 September 1994, concurrently with the 1994 Swedish general election. Using a party-list proportional representation system to allocate the 101 seats of the Stockholm city council (Stockholms kommunfullmäktige) amongst the various Swedish political parties. Voter turnout was 81.2%.

Two parties disappeared from the city council as a result this election. The Christian Democratic Social Party, after winning seats on the city council for the first time in the previous election in 1991, lost all their seats, though they would regain a mandate in 1998 and retain it in each subsequent election (as of the 2006 elections).

The right-wing New Democracy party lost all six of their previously held seats as a result of this election, though they managed to hold on to a mandate to the national Swedish Riksdag as part of the concurrent parliamentary election. The party would never regain seats on the Stockholm City Council, and was declared bankrupt in 2000.

== Results ==
| Party | Votes | | | Seats | |
| Party | # | % | + – | # | + – |
|---|---|---|---|---|---|
| Social Democrats; Socialdemokraterna (s) | 148,684 | 33.0% | +3.6% | 37 | +4 |
| Moderate Party; Moderaterna (m) | 128,975 | 28.7% | –0.5% | 29 | –3 |
| Left Party; Vänsterpartiet (v) | 41,274 | 9.2% | +1.1% | 11 | +2 |
| Liberal People's Party; Folkpartiet liberalerna (fp) | 35,437 | 7.9% | –2.2% | 9 | –3 |
| Green Party; Miljöpartiet (mp) | 35,120 | 7.8% | +3.9% | 8 | +6 |
| Centre Party; Centerpartiet (c) | 24,329 | 5.4% | +1.9% | 5 | +4 |
| Christian Democrats; Kristdemokratiska samlingspartiet (kd) | 9,399 | 2.1% | –1.7% | 0 | –3 |
| Stockholm Party – Stockholmspartiet (sp) | 26,842^{[1]} | 6.0%^{[1]} | –6.1%^{[1]} | 2 | –1 |
| New Democracy – Ny Demokrati (nyd) | 26,842^{[1]} | 6.0%^{[1]} | –6.1%^{[1]} | 0 | –6 |
| Total | 450,060 | 100% | — | 101 | ±0 |
| Invalid ballots | 6,839 | | | | |

== See also ==
- Elections in Sweden
- List of political parties in Sweden
- City of Stockholm

== Notes ==
^{1} No separate election data available for New Democracy or the Stockholm Party.
