= 1998 Stockholm municipal election =

Swedish local election

The Stockholm municipal election of 1998 was held on 15 September 1998, concurrently with the 1998 Swedish general election. Using a party-list proportional representation system to allocate the 101 seats of the Stockholm city council (Stockholms kommunfullmäktige) amongst the various Swedish political parties. Voter turnout was 76.9%.

The results for the Social Democrats were the lowest in decades, and for the first time since the initiation of universal male suffrage in 1911, the Moderates outnumbered the Social Democrats to become the largest party on the Stockholm City Council as a result of this election.

== Results ==
Party	Votes			Seats	
Party	#	%	+ –	#	+ –
Moderate Party; Moderaterna (m)	146,797	32.9%	+4.3%	35	+6
Social Democrats; Socialdemokraterna (s)	114,118	25.6%	–7.4%	29	–8
Left Party; Vänsterpartiet (v)	54,663	12.3%	+3.1%	13	+2
Liberal People's Party; Folkpartiet liberalerna (fp)	34,789	7.8%	–0.1%	9	±0
Christian Democrats; Kristdemokratiska samlingspartiet (kd)	28,320	6.4%	+4.3%	6	+6
Green Party; Miljöpartiet (mp)	26,347	5.9%	–1.9%	6	–2
Stockholm Party; Stockholmspartiet (sp)	19,561	4.4%	NA^{[1]}	3	+1
Centre Party; Centerpartiet (c)	9,187	2.1%	–3.3%	0	–5
Other parties	11,942	2.7%	NA^{[1]}	0	±0
Total	445,724	100%	—	101	±0
Invalid ballots	8,469				

== See also ==
- Elections in Sweden
- List of political parties in Sweden
- City of Stockholm

== Notes ==
^{1} No separate election results were available for the Stockholm Party for the 1994 Stockholm municipal election, and thus year-to-year vote comparison is not possible.
