= 2002 Stockholm municipal election =

Swedish local election

The 2002 Stockholm municipal election was held on Sunday, 15 September 2002. The election used a party-list proportional representation system to allocate the 101-seats of the Stockholm City Council (Stockholms stadsfullmäktige) to the various Swedish political parties. This election was held concurrently with the 2002 Swedish parliamentary election. Voter turnout was 77.7%.

This election marks the first time since the election of 1976 that the Stockholm Party failed to win any seats, ending their 23-year streak of representation on the City Council.

== Results ==
Party	Votes			Seats	
Party	#	%	+ –	#	+ –
Social Democrats; Socialdemokraterna (s)	149,871	32.1%	+6.5%	35	+6
Moderate Party; Moderaterna (m)	121,405	26.0%	–6.9%	28	–8
Liberal People's Party; Folkpartiet liberalerna (fp)	73,736	15.8%	+8.0%	17	+8
Left Party; Vänsterpartiet (v)	52,325	11.2%	–1.1%	11	–2
Green Party; Miljöpartiet (mp)	24,965	5.3%	–0.6%	6	±0
Christian Democrats; Kristdemokratiska samlingspartiet (kd)	20,746	4.4%	–1.9%	5	–1
Stockholm Party; Stockholmspartiet (sp)	9,137	2.0%	–2.4%	0	–3
Centre Party; Centerpartiet (c)	5,939	1.3%	–0.8%	0	±0
Other parties	8,772	1.9%	–0.8%	0	±0
Total	466,896	100%	—	101	±0
Invalid ballots	8,469				

== See also ==
- Elections in Sweden
- Swedish Election Authority
- Politics of Sweden
- List of political parties in Sweden
