= Swedish elections, 2002 =

Swedish elections, 2002 can refer to the following elections that were held on Sunday September 15, 2002:

- 2002 Swedish general election, to elect the Riksdag
- 2002 Swedish county council elections, to elect the 21 County Councils
- 2002 Swedish municipal elections, to elect the 290 municipal councils
