= 2006 Swedish general election =

- 17 September 2006

All 349 seats in the Riksdag 175 seats needed for a majority
- Registered: 6,892,009
- Turnout: 81.99% (▲1.88 pp)
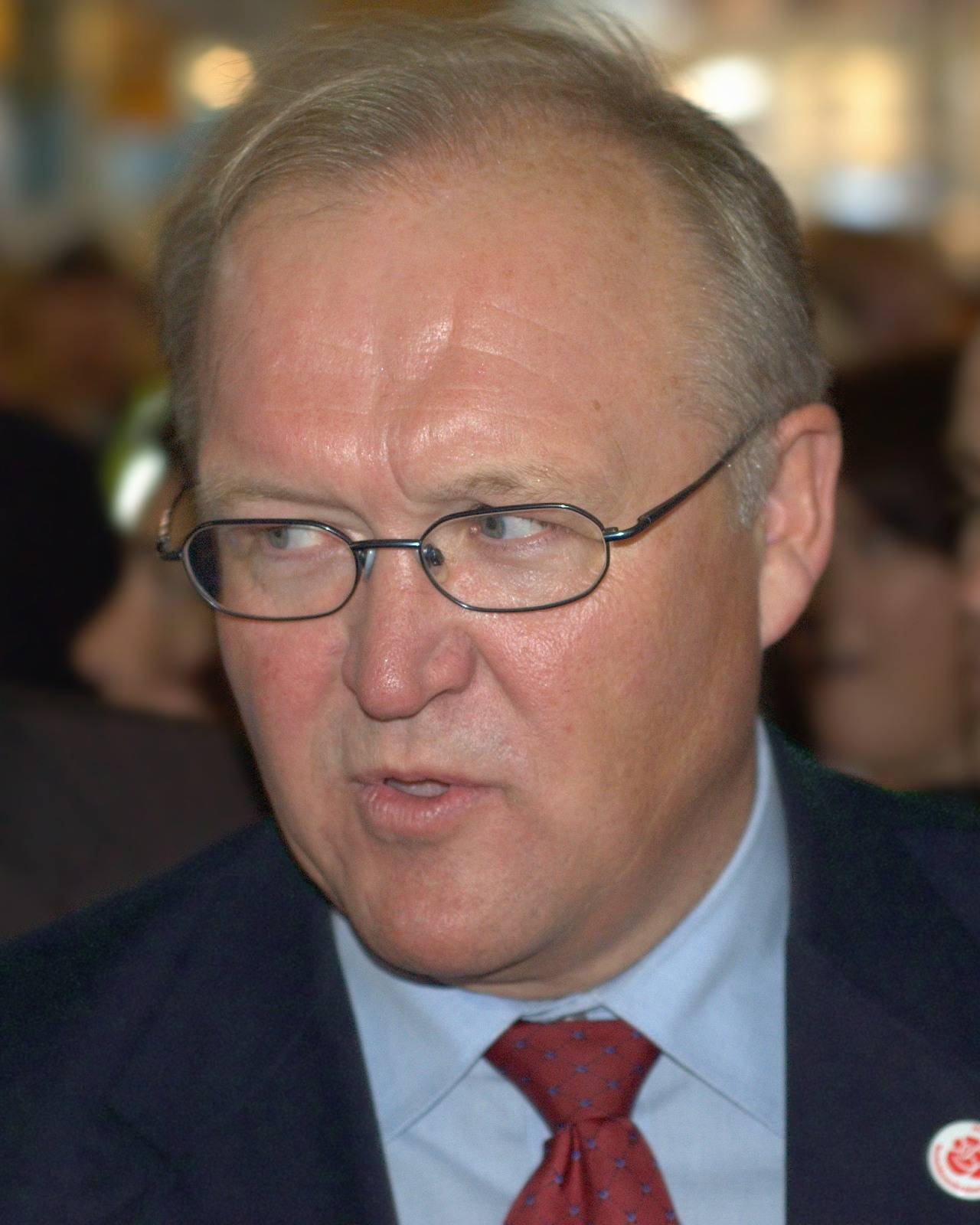

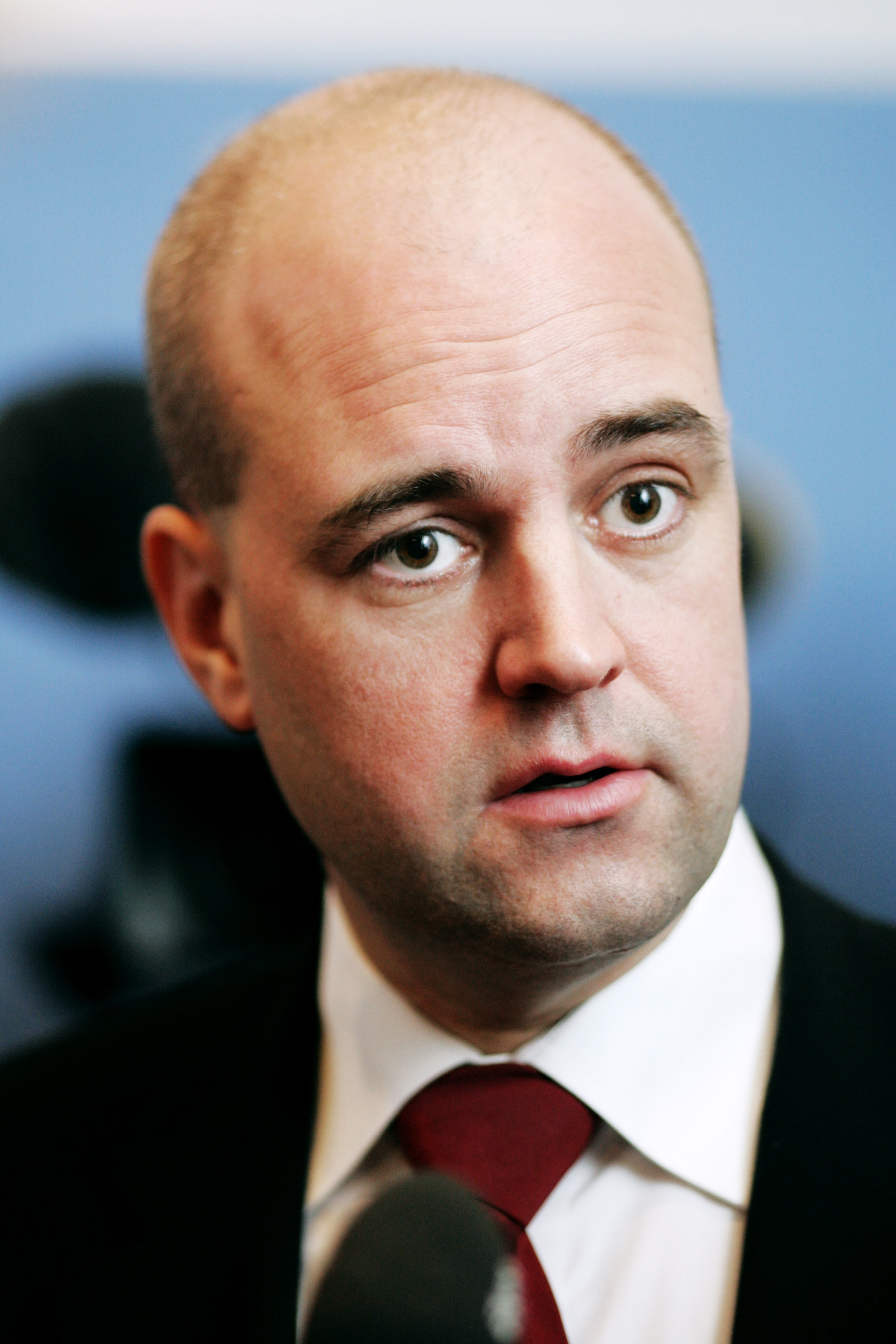

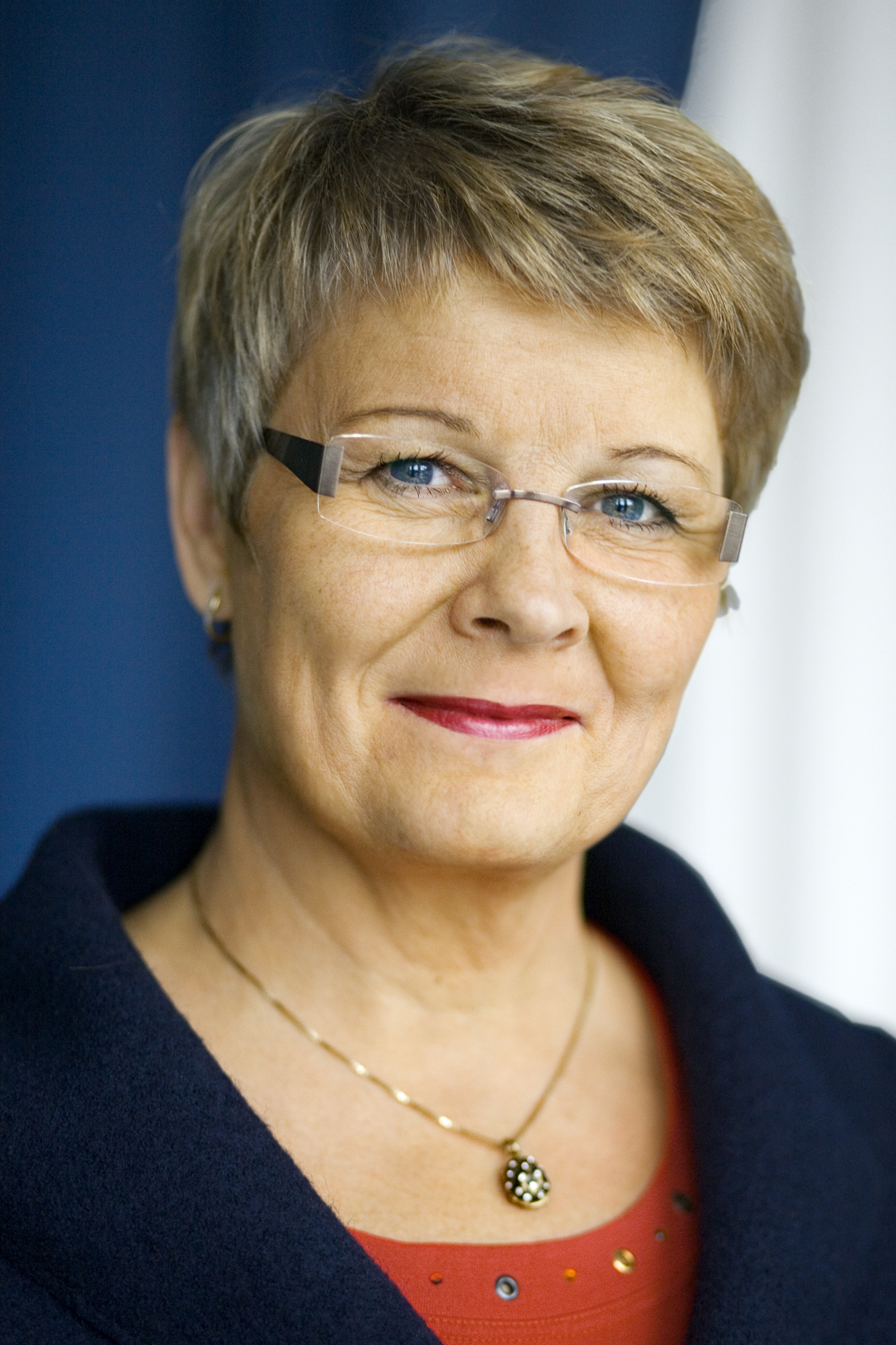

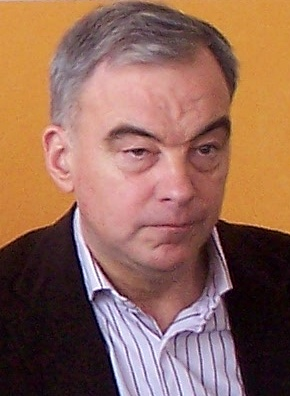

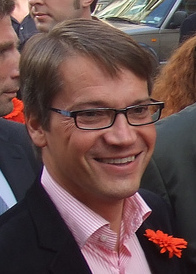

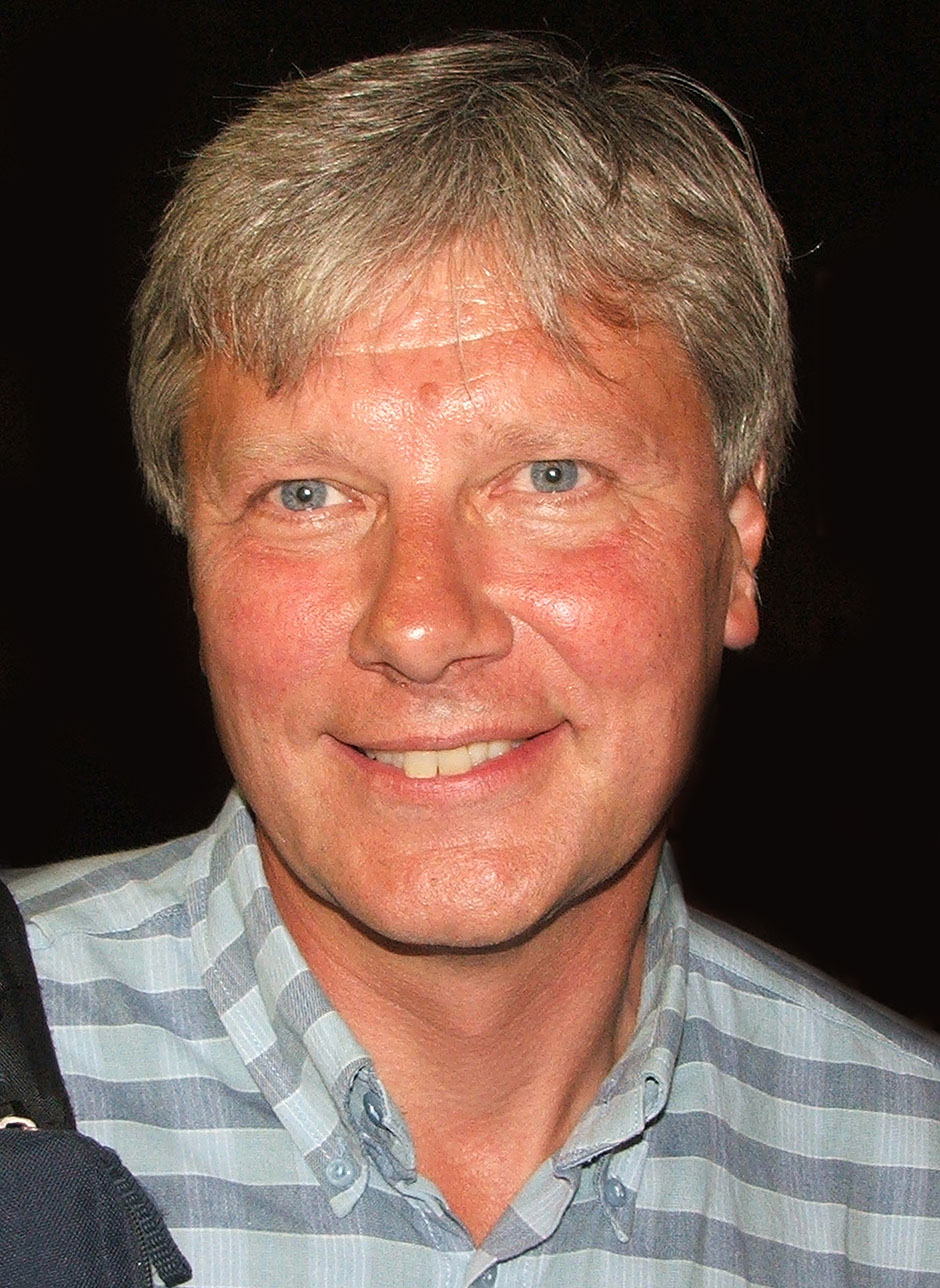

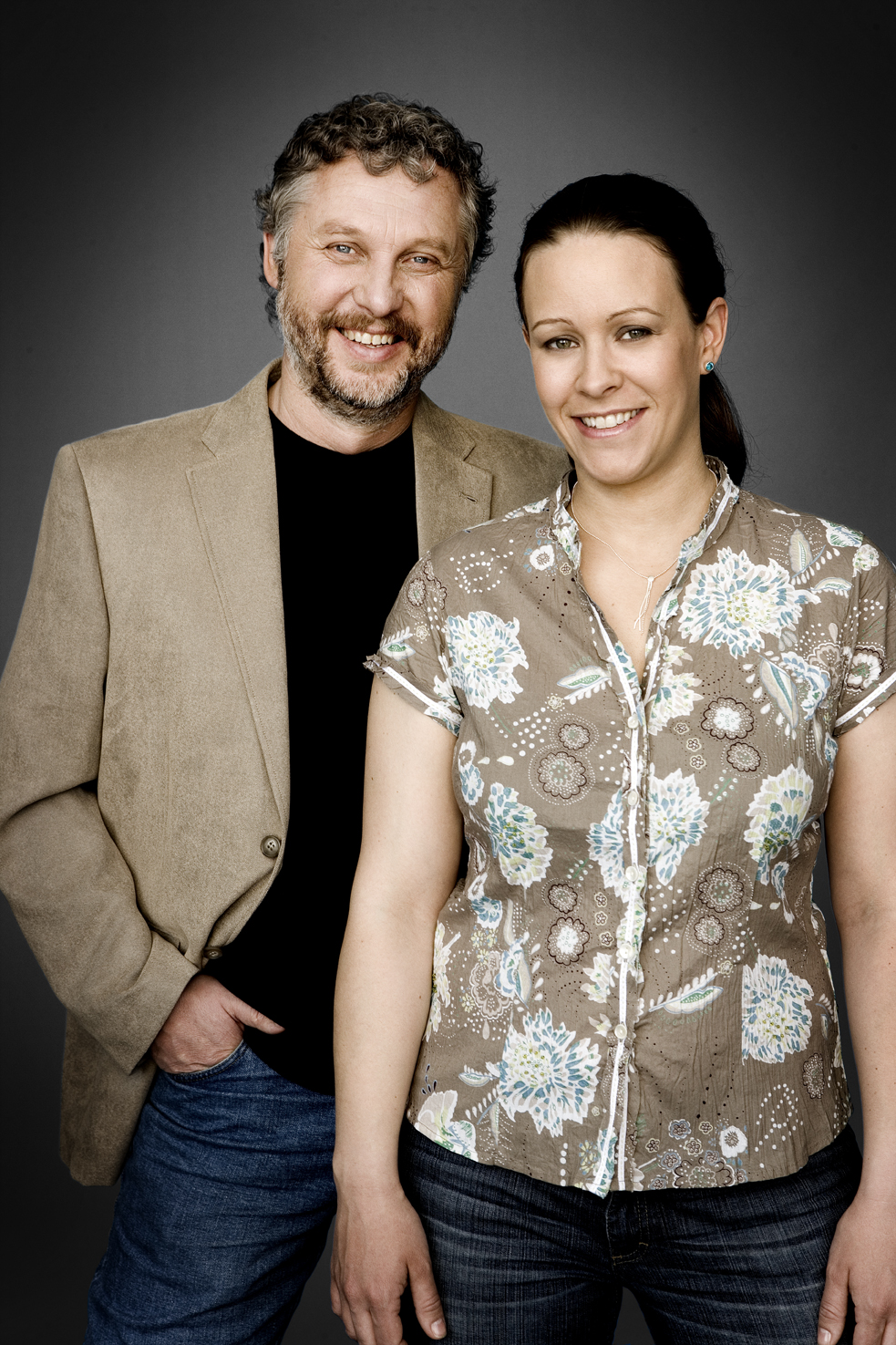
	First party	Second party	Third party
Leader	Göran Persson	Fredrik Reinfeldt	Maud Olofsson
Party	Social Democrats	Moderate	Centre
Alliance		The Alliance	The Alliance
Last election	144	55	22
Seats won	130	97	29
Seat change	▼14	▲42	▲7
Popular vote	1,942,625	1,456,014	437,389
Percentage	34.99%	26.23%	7.88%
Swing	▼4.86 pp	▲10.97 pp	▲1.69 pp
	Fourth party	Fifth party	Sixth party
Leader	Lars Leijonborg	Göran Hägglund	Lars Ohly
Party	Liberals	Christian Democrats	Left
Alliance	The Alliance	The Alliance
Last election	48	33	30
Seats won	28	24	22
Seat change	▼20	▼9	▼8
Popular vote	418,395	365,998	324,722
Percentage	7.54%	6.59%	5.85%
Swing	▼5.85 pp	▼2.56 pp	▼2.54 pp
	Seventh party
Leader	Peter Eriksson; Maria Wetterstrand
Party	Green
Last election	17
Seats won	19
Seat change	▲2
Popular vote	291,121
Percentage	5.24%
Swing	▲0.59 pp
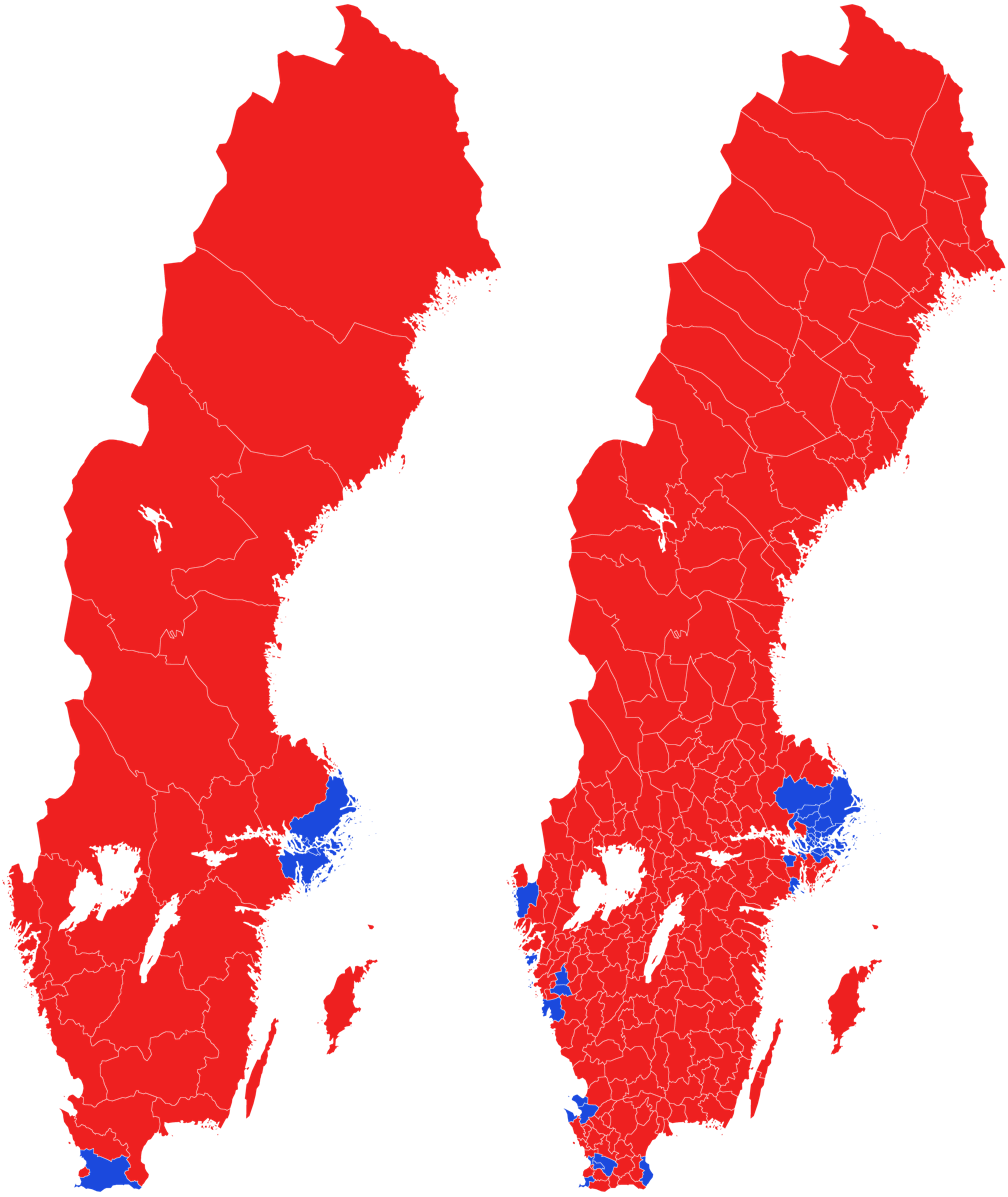
Prime Minister before election
Göran Persson
Social Democrats
Elected Prime Minister
Fredrik Reinfeldt
Moderate

General elections were held in Sweden on 17 September 2006, to elect members to the Riksdag, the Swedish national legislature. All 349 seats were up for election: 310 fixed seats in 29 constituencies and 39 adjustment seats, used to ensure that parties have representation in the Riksdag proportional to their share of the national vote. The electoral system used was semi-open list proportional representation using the Sainte-Laguë method of allocating seats. Elections for County and Municipal councils were also held on the same day.

Fredrik Reinfeldt from the Moderate Party was able to form a majority government together with the Centre Party, Liberal People's Party and the Christian Democrats following the election. The Social Democrats were ousted after twelve years in power. It was the country's first majority government since the second Fälldin cabinet fell in 1981.

Reinfeldt reached out to working-class votes in the re-branding as the 'New Moderates', which resulted in sizeable gains in historically left-wing locations in densely populated areas. As a result, several municipalities that had never voted blue before in Stockholm County flipped. This, combined with a landslide overall win in the capital region as a whole and strong showings in Scania tipped the balance in favour of the Alliance. The centre-right bloc also flipped the crucial populous municipalities Gothenburg, Linköping, Uppsala and Västerås.

The Social Democrats recorded around 35% of the overall support, which was the party's worst showing in the post-war era. Although the red-green parties received a higher proportion of the vote than in the 1991 hung parliament loss, the coalition fell short of a majority by seven seats, or two percentage points of the popular vote.

The Alliance did not reach 50% of the vote, courtesy of several minor parties gathering up 5.67% of the overall vote. This was the final election before the Sweden Democrats entered the Riksdag, with the party getting close to three percent of the vote, falling short by just above one percentage point. The election also saw the party get above 10% in Bjuv Municipality in its Scanian heartlands and above the parliamentary threshold in the country's five southernmost constituencies.

== Campaign ==
The campaigning for the 2006 election began early, as the opposition decided to present itself as a viable alternative government by forming an alliance: Alliance for Sweden. This alliance was negotiated at a meeting held in the village of Högfors, home to the chairman of the Centre Party, Maud Olofsson. The meeting ended on 31 August 2004 with the presentation of a joint declaration outlining the principles under which the four parties intended to run in the election. One year later a similar meeting was held at Bankeryd, home of Göran Hägglund, leader of the Christian Democrats. See Alliance for Sweden for further information.

The Alliance enjoyed a leading position for over a year over the red-green parties, according to most polls. However the gap between the two blocs (s, v, and mp are assumed to work together) began to close rapidly in January 2006, and the red-green parties took the lead in May 2006; indeed they were ahead of the Alliance in every poll conducted in May and June. However, there was a late shift in opinion back to the Alliance during the summer: in mid-August all polls showed the Alliance leading the red-green parties comfortably.

=== Unemployment ===
The Social Democrat government's perceived failure to reduce unemployment was a major issue in the campaign, especially considering the good performance of the Swedish economy (when compared with that of the rest of Europe). The opposition also argued that "real" unemployment was much higher than the official figure of 4.8% (as of May 2006). They quoted a figure of 1,037,000 (or 17.9% of the labour force in January 2006) for those who are "outside the labour market because they do not have a job or are studying". If those who are "wholly or partially outside the labour market" are included then the figure rises to 1,700,000. This gloomy view of the unemployment situation was raised by Jan Edling, a former economist for the Swedish Trade Union Confederation (LO). However, compared with other OECD countries Sweden has a low "broad unemployment", as was pointed out by the Green Party's Peter Eriksson in the debate.

Alliance for Sweden proposed to address the problem by cutting income tax for the lowest income earners (by increasing the tax-free allowance), cutting the payroll tax (and abolishing it for parts of the service sector), and making wages paid for household work tax-deductible. Critics of the proposed tax reforms said that, because the cuts would be funded by reducing unemployment benefit and sick pay, they would be harming the most needy in society rather than helping them as Alliance for Sweden claimed.

In addition the Centre Party proposed a special youth contract of employment for those aged under 26, allowing their term of employment to be ended by their employer up to two years after they begin work. This controversial proposal (not adopted by the Alliance as a whole) was intended to increase youth employment by making taking on new employees less risky for the employer, but it was criticised by the red-green parties as reducing job security for the young. A similar contract introduced by the French government (the Contrat première embauche) caused demonstrations and riots against the legislation across France. In a debate article in Göteborgs-Posten on 21 March 2006, Wanja Lundby-Wedin, Chairperson of LO, wrote:

"[Maud Olofsson's] new proposal to abolish job security for the young will not result in more jobs. It will only lead to increased insecurity and an even larger exclusion... More than half of youths under 25 who work already have an insecure job; a time-limited job of some sort. This is most usual among our young female members. The most insecure jobs, 'need-employment' or the so-called 'phone and run locum' is entirely on the employer's terms. Every morning many people sit and wait for their employer to ring. Am I needed today or not?".

Olofsson replied two days later in the same newspaper:

"What LO's Chairperson has not understood is that those youths who already have a job are not covered by our proposal. It does however give a new opportunity for the 146,000 youths who are wholly or partially living in the exclusion the Social Democrats have created... One of the main reasons why companies don't take on new staff is that the risk is too large. If the gamble doesn't pay off then the costs are too great. By lowering the threshold for job creation we are convinced that many youths will be able to take their first steps onto a labour market that they today have never been able to set foot on. We are equally convinced that the great majority of these youths will show their employers that they were right to dare to employ them".

A survey carried out by the Confederation of Swedish Enterprise (Svenskt Näringsliv) indicated that 41% of Swedish companies believe that such a contract would increase their willingness to hire young people "to a great extent" and that 51% believe that it would increase it "to a certain extent". 7% of those surveyed said that they did not think that they would be more willing to hire youth if the contract was to become available.

=== Computer break-in by Liberal People's Party members ===
On 4 September 2006, only two weeks before the general election, the Social Democratic Party reported to the police a computer break-in into its internal network. It has been reported that members of the Liberal People's Party copied sensitive information, not yet officially released, on at least two occasions for the purpose of counter-attacking Social Democratic political propositions. On 5 September the Liberal Party Secretary Johan Jakobsson voluntarily resigned. After the break-in, investigations were opened against leading members of the Liberal People's Party under suspicion of criminal activity relating to the 4 September computer infringement affair.

== Opinion polls ==
The charts below show the results of pre-election polls conducted by the five major polling institutes in Sweden.

TEMO has a summary of all polls conducted since the election in 2002, and is therefore cited as the reference for each poll.

=== Temo ===
Party	August 2006	July 2006	June 2006	May 2006	April 2006	March 2006	February 2006	January 2006	December 2005	November 2005	October 2005	September 2005	Last election
Social Democrats (s)	37.7%	34.8%	36.8%	38.3%	36.5%	34.9%	36.3%	34.3%	34.5%	35.7%	32.1%	35.5%	39.9%
Moderate Party (m)	28.0%	28.6%	26.3%	26.9%	27.9%	29.2%	28.4%	30.9%	30.3%	27.6%	31.6%	31.4%	15.3%
Liberal People's Party (fp)	9.8%	10.2%	9.9%	8.7%	9.9%	9.7%	10.5%	10.0%	10.4%	9.4%	9.4%	8.7%	13.4%
Christian Democrats (kd)	5.4%	5.6%	5.6%	5.9%	6.3%	6.4%	5.1%	4.4%	4.9%	4.0%	4.3%	3.7%	9.1%
Left Party (v)	3.6%	4.7%	5.9%	5.4%	5.1%	6.2%	6.0%	6.2%	5.2%	6.1%	5.9%	5.7%	8.4%
Centre Party (c)	6.1%	5.7%	5.8%	6.3%	6.0%	5.3%	6.2%	5.6%	6.2%	6.5%	5.6%	6.8%	6.2%
Green Party (mp)	5.3%	5.8%	4.5%	4.9%	5.3%	5.1%	4.6%	4.8%	5.2%	4.8%	4.6%	4.7%	4.6%
June List (jl)	-	-	-	-	-	-	1.2%	1.0%	3.2%	4.5%	-	-	NA
Alliance for Sweden (m, c, fp, kd)	49.3%	50.1%	47.6%	47.8%	50.1%	50.6%	50.2%	50.9%	51.8%	47.5%	50.9%	50.6%	44.0%
Red-Green bloc (s, v, mp)	46.5%	45.2%	47.2%	48.6%	46.8%	46.2%	46.9%	45.3%	44.9%	46.6%	42.6%	45.9%	52.9%
Undecided (?)	22.6%	22.8%	18.6%	19.6%	20.3%	21.2%	NA%	NA%	NA%	NA%	NA%	NA%	NA

=== Sifo ===
Party	7 September 2006	August 2006	August 2006	August 2006	June 2006	May 2006	April 2006	March 2006	February 2006	January 2006	December 2005	Last election
Social Democrats (s)	35.7%	35.8%	34.1%	34.6%	37.6%	36.6%	36.2%	36.2%	34.9%	35.3%	33.2%	39.9%
Moderate Party (m)	26.0%	24.3%	28.6%	26.7%	26.9%	25.2%	26.2%	28.2%	28.1%	30.9%	29.7%	15.3%
Liberal People's Party (fp)	7.6%	10.2%	11.1%	10.3%	9.2%	11.7%	11.5%	10.2%	10.7%	9.3%	10.6%	13.4%
Christian Democrats (kd)	7.5%	6.5%	7.0%	6.9%	5.0%	5.2%	5.4%	5.9%	6.0%	4.8%	4.6%	9.1%
Left Party (v)	7.1%	5.6%	5.9%	5.6%	6.1%	6.8%	6.4%	5.6%	6.0%	6.7%	6%	8.4%
Centre Party (c)	6.2%	6.7%	4.9%	6.6%	6.2%	5.8%	5.3%	6.7%	5.8%	6.9%	6.7%	6.2%
Green Party (mp)	5.7%	6.0%	4.5%	5.9%	5.2%	5.5%	5.2%	4.4%	4.9%	4.1%	4.5%	4.6%
June List (jl)	-	-	-	-	-	-	-	2.2%	-	-	-	NA
Alliance for Sweden (m, c, fp, kd)	47.3%	47.7%	51.5%	50.5%	47.3%	47.9%	48.4%	51.0%	50.6%	51.9%	51.6%	44.0%
Red-Green bloc (s, v, mp)	48.2%	47.3%	44.9%	46.1%	48.9%	48.9%	47.8%	46.2%	45.8%	46.1%	43.7%	52.9%
Undecided (?)	-	15.1%	20.0%	19.2%	17.6%	17.4%	18.9%	16.2%	17.8%	17.9%	20.5%	NA

=== Demoskop ===
Party	August 2006	July 2006	June 2006	May 2006	April 2006	March 2006	February 2006	January 2006	December 2005	November 2005	October 2005	September 2005	August 2005	July 2005	Last election
Social Democrats (s)	33.7%	35.7%	37.4%	36.2%	37.8%	36.4%	36.3%	37.9%	31.9%	33.1%	35.3%	35.8%	31.7%	29.3%	39.9%
Moderate Party (m)	30.4%	30.9%	27.4%	30.3%	30.0%	31.0%	31.6%	30.8%	30.5%	31.3%	30.8%	30.6%	31.6%	35.8%	15.3%
Liberal People's Party (fp)	9.9%	8.0%	8.8%	10.0%	8.8%	9.3%	9.1%	10.1%	9.7%	9.3%	11%	8.7%	10.8%	9.7%	13.4%
Christian Democrats (kd)	5.5%	5.3%	5.7%	4.0%	4.9%	3.6%	4.0%	3.6%	4.5%	3.1%	3.3%	4.0%	4.8%	4.3%	9.1%
Left Party (v)	6.9%	4.4%	6.9%	7.1%	5.2%	4.5%	7.2%	5.6%	6.7%	7.3%	5.9%	8.1%	5.2%	6.2%	8.4%
Centre Party (c)	4.6%	7.3%	5.4%	3.6%	4.8%	5.9%	4.7%	4.2%	6.3%	6.7%	4.7%	5.8%	7.8%	6.5%	6.2%
Green Party (mp)	5.2%	4.2%	6.2%	5.5%	4.9%	5.1%	5.5%	6.2%	6.2%	4.2%	4.2%	4.4%	6.2%	4.7%	4.6%
Alliance for Sweden (m, c, fp, kd)	50.5%	51.5%	47.3%	47.9%	48.5%	49.8%	49.4%	48.7%	51.0%	50.4%	49.8%	49.1%	55.0%	56.3%	44.0%
Red-Green bloc (s, v, mp)	45.8%	44.3%	50.5%	48.8%	47.9%	46.0%	49.0%	49.7%	44.8%	44.6%	45.4%	48.3%	43.1%	40.2%	52.9%

=== Skop ===
Party	August 2006	July 2006	June 2006	May 2006	April 2006	March 2006	February 2006	January 2006	December 2005	Last election
Social Democrats (s)	35.5%	34.5%	36.2%	37.8%	34.7%	39.0%	36.3%	35.9%	36.9%	39.9%
Moderate Party (m)	26.9%	24.2%	25.3%	24.8%	21.9%	23.5%	26.7%	23.9%	24.2%	15.3%
Liberal People's Party (fp)	10.1%	10.9%	12.0%	10.2%	12.7%	9.6%	11.0%	11.8%	10.7%	13.4%
Christian Democrats (kd)	7.2%	6.8%	6.2%	6.4%	6.9%	6.4%	6.0%	6.6%	4.6%	9.1%
Left Party (v)	4.4%	5.9%	5.9%	6.5%	7.6%	5.7%	5.4%	6.9%	6.3%	8.4%
Centre Party (c)	6.1%	7.2%	5.9%	6.2%	7.4%	6.9%	6.4%	6.6%	6.9%	6.2%
Green Party (mp)	5.1%	6.6%	4.8%	4.8%	5.3%	5.7%	5.0%	4.6%	6.9%	4.6%
June List (jl)	2.0%	1.2%	-	1.4%	-	1.0%	1.0%	1.6%	1.6%	NA
Alliance for Sweden (m, c, fp, kd)	50.3%	49.1%	49.4%	47.6%	48.9%	46.4%	50.1%	48.9%	46.4%	44.0%
Red-Green bloc (s, v, mp)	45.3%	47.3%	46.9%	49.1%	47.2%	50.4%	46.7%	47.4%	50.1%	52.9%

=== Ruab ===
Party	August 2006	June 2006	May 2006	April 2006	March 2006	February 2006	January 2006	December 2005	Last election
Social Democrats (s)	40.4%	37.2%	36.8%	35.2%	37.1%	35.4%	36.4%	38.0%	39.9%
Moderate Party (m)	29.1%	30.4%	29.9%	32.9%	30.2%	32.0%	31.3%	29.0%	15.3%
Liberal People's Party (fp)	8.7%	8.4%	8.8%	8.9%	11.0%	9.7%	8.7%	9.3%	13.4%
Christian Democrats (kd)	5.0%	4.7%	4.7%	5.2%	2.8%	3.7%	4.0%	4.2%	9.1%
Left Party (v)	4.6%	5.5%	7.1%	5.6%	5.3%	4.9%	5.0%	4.2%	8.4%
Centre Party (c)	5.1%	5.0%	4.6%	4.5%	5.8%	4.7%	6.8%	6.7%	6.2%
Green Party (mp)	4.6%	6.3%	5.1%	5.2%	4.6%	6.6%	5.6%	4.7%	4.6%
June List (jl)	-	-	-	-	-	-	1.1%	1.5%	NA
Alliance for Sweden (m, c, fp, kd)	47.9%	48.5%	48.0%	51.5%	49.8%	50.1%	50.8%	49.2%	44.0%
Red-Green bloc (s, v, mp)	49.6%	49.0%	49.0%	46.0%	47.0%	46.9%	47.0%	46.9%	52.9%

== Debates ==
2006 Swedish general election debates
Date	Time	Organizers	Moderators	P Present I Invitee N Non-invitee							
Date	Time	Organizers	Moderators	S	M	L	KD	V	C	MP	Refs
10 September 2006		Sveriges Television	Anna Hedenmo	P Göran Persson	P Fredrik Reinfeldt	N	N	N	N	N	
15 September 2006		Sveriges Television	Mats Knutson; Marianne Rundström	P Göran Persson	P Fredrik Reinfeldt	P Lars Leijonborg	P Göran Hägglund	P Lars Ohly	P Maud Olofsson	P Peter Eriksson	

== Results ==
The final results were published on 21 September 2006 by the Swedish Election Authority (Valmyndigheten). Apart from separating the minor parties, there were no big changes to the preliminary count from the election night. 6,892,009 people were eligible to vote in the election. The results are here compared with the 2002 election. There were 5,551,278 valid ballots cast, a turnout of 82%.

Party	Votes	%	Seats	+/–
Swedish Social Democratic Party	1,942,625	34.99	130	–14
Moderate Party	1,456,014	26.23	97	+42
Centre Party	437,389	7.88	29	+7
Liberal People's Party	418,395	7.54	28	–20
Christian Democrats	365,998	6.59	24	–9
Left Party	324,722	5.85	22	–8
Green Party	291,121	5.24	19	+2
Sweden Democrats	162,463	2.93	0	0
Feminist Initiative	37,954	0.68	0	New
Pirate Party	34,918	0.63	0	New
Swedish Senior Citizen Interest Party	28,806	0.52	0	0
June List	26,072	0.47	0	New
Health Care Party	11,519	0.21	0	New
National Democrats	3,064	0.06	0	0
Unity	2,648	0.05	0	0
National Socialist Front	1,417	0.03	0	New
New Future	1,171	0.02	0	0
Socialist Justice Party	1,097	0.02	0	0
People's Will	881	0.02	0	New
Communist Party	438	0.01	0	0
Unique Party	222	0.00	0	New
Classical Liberal Party	202	0.00	0	New
Alliance Party	133	0.00	0	0
Women's Power	116	0.00	0	New
European Workers Party	83	0.00	0	0
Direct Democrats	81	0.00	0	New
Sweden out of the EU / Freedom and Justice Party	75	0.00	0	New
National Democratic Party	68	0.00	0	0
Partiet.se	61	0.00	0	New
September List	51	0.00	0	New
Communist League	30	0.00	0	0
Nordic Union	24	0.00	0	New
Scania Party	11	0.00	0	0
Tax Reformists	9	0.00	0	0
Rikshushållarna	8	0.00	0	0
Miata Party	7	0.00	0	New
New Swedes D.P.N.S.	6	0.00	0	0
Fårgutapartiet	6	0.00	0	New
Palmes Party	5	0.00	0	New
Republicans	2	0.00	0	0
Viking Party	1	0.00	0	New
Write-in votes	1,365	0.02	0	–
Total	5,551,278	100.00	349	0
Valid votes	5,551,278	98.25		
Invalid/blank votes	99,138	1.75		
Total votes	5,650,416	100.00		
Registered voters/turnout	6,892,009	81.99		
Source: Val.se

Three hours after the polls closed, the result was clear enough for Moderate Party leader Fredrik Reinfeldt to declare himself the victor and for Göran Persson to announce his resignation as prime minister and as leader of the Social Democratic Party. The four centre-right parties of Alliance for Sweden formed, as expected, a government with Fredrik Reinfeldt as Prime Minister. The Speaker had asked Reinfeldt to begin this formation on 19 September but, as is usual, requested the Cabinet of Göran Persson to stay on as a caretaker government until the Riksdag formally elected a new prime minister. The newly elected Riksdag convened on 2 October and the government was presented on 6 October.

The election result is historic in being the worst result for the Social Democrats ever in a general election with universal suffrage (introduced in 1921) and the best result for the Moderates since 1928.

Minor parties, that are not represented in the Riksdag, got a total of 5.7% of the votes, which was an increase of 2.6 percentage points, compared to the 2002 election. Behind this increase lay a great success for the Sweden Democrats, gaining 2.9% (+1.5 percentage points) and thus surpassing the limit (2.5%) for gaining governmental financial support for the next four years. Two new parties, Feminist Initiative (0.7%) and the Pirate Party (0.6%), also contributed to the increase.

Of the 349 elected Riksdag members, 164 (or 47%) were women.

=== Seat distribution ===
Constituency	Total seats	Seats won								
Constituency	Total seats	By party							By coalition	
Constituency	Total seats	S	M	C	F	KD	V	MP	Alliance	Red-green
Blekinge	5	3	2						2	3
Dalarna	13	5	3	1	1	1	1	1	6	7
Gävleborg	11	5	2	1	1		1	1	4	7
Gothenburg	18	5	5	1	2	1	2	2	9	9
Gotland	2	1	1						1	1
Halland	10	4	3	1	1	1			6	4
Jämtland	5	3	1	1					2	3
Jönköping	13	5	3	1	1	2	1		7	6
Kalmar	8	4	2	1		1			4	4
Kronoberg	7	3	2	1		1			4	3
Malmö	10	4	3		1		1	1	4	6
Norrbotten	9	6	1	1			1		2	7
Örebro	12	5	2	1	1	1	1	1	5	7
Östergötland	15	6	4	1	1	1	1	1	7	8
Skåne North and East	10	4	3	1	1	1			6	4
Skåne South	13	4	5	1	1	1		1	8	5
Skåne West	10	4	4	1	1				6	4
Södermanland	12	5	2	1	1	1	1	1	5	7
Stockholm County	42	10	17	3	4	3	2	3	27	15
Stockholm Municipality	28	6	11	2	3	1	2	3	17	11
Uppsala	12	4	3	1	1	1	1	1	6	6
Värmland	11	5	2	1	1	1	1		5	6
Västerbotten	11	5	1	1	1	1	1	1	4	7
Västernorrland	11	5	2	1	1	1	1		5	6
Västmanland	9	4	2	1	1		1		4	5
Västra Götaland East	11	4	3	1	1	1	1		6	5
Västra Götaland North	11	4	2	1	1	1	1	1	5	6
Västra Götaland South	7	3	2	1		1			4	3
Västra Götaland West	13	4	4	1	1	1	1	1	7	6
Total	349	130	97	29	28	24	22	19	178	171
Source: Statistics Sweden

=== By municipality ===
Votes by municipality. The municipalities are the color of the party that got the most votes within the coalition that won relative majority.

Votes by municipality as a scale from red/Red-green bloc to blue/Alliance for Sweden.

Cartogram of the vote with each municipality rescaled in proportion to the number of valid votes. Deeper blue represents a relative majority for Alliance for Sweden, brighter red represents a relative majority for the Red-Green bloc.

Map showing the voting shifts from the 2002 to the 2006 election. Darker blue indicates a municipality voted more towards the parties that form Alliance for Sweden. Darker red indicates a municipality voted more towards the parties that form the red-green bloc.

== Aftermath ==
The minority government of Göran Persson's Social Democratic Party attempted, and failed, to gain enough seats to form a majority government, to continue as a minority or to govern in a red-green coalition government. His party had been in power since the 1994 election, and Persson had been prime minister since 1996. The Social Democrats before the election had an agreement with the Left Party and the Green Party that gave them an influence on government policy in exchange for their support. However, both the Left Party and the Green Party insisted that any red-green government formed after the election would need to include them in a coalition.

The four centre-right parties – The Moderate Party (m), The Liberal People's Party (fp), The Christian Democrats (kd), and The Centre Party (c) – united in Alliance for Sweden succeeded in gaining enough seats to form a coalition government. The four parties (formerly in opposition) had presented a joint election manifesto (although c, fp, and kd still had individual manifestos). Their candidate for Prime Minister was the Moderate Party leader, Fredrik Reinfeldt.

== See also ==
- Cabinet of Fredrik Reinfeldt
- List of political parties in Sweden
