= Future Party =

Future Party is the name of a number of unrelated political parties including:

- Future Party (Australia), a political party in Australia from 2013 to 2016, now named Science Party
- Egypt's Future Party, a political party in Egypt
- Japan Future Party, a political party in Japan
- Future Party (Sweden), a political party in Sweden
- Future Party (Turkey), a political party in Turkey
- Future Movement, a political party in Lebanon
- Party for the Future, a political party in the Netherlands
- Party of the Future, a political party in Netherlands
- Canadian Future Party
- FUTURO, a political party in Aruba

== See also ==
- New Future Coalition Party, a political party in Norway
- Party for European Future, a political party in the Republic of Macedonia
- Yesh Atid (There is a Future), a political party in Israel
- United Future, a political party in New Zealand
- Bareunmirae Party (Righteous Future Party), a former political party in South Korea
- Our Future, a political party in Korea
