= 1991 Stockholm municipal election =

Swedish local election

The Stockholm municipal election of 1991 was held on 15 September 1991 concurrently with the 1991 Swedish parliamentary election. This election used a party-list proportional representation system to allocate the 101 seats of the Stockholm City Council (Stockholms stadsfullmäktige) amongst the various Swedish political parties. Voter turnout was 81.6%.

Three political parties gained seats on the Stockholm City Council for the first time as a result of this election. The oldest was the Christian Democratic Social Party, which was founded in 1964, and also won a parliamentary mandate for the first time in this election. Another new addition was the Swedish Green Party, which had been participating in elections since 1982 but first won seats on the city council in this election; though they were already represented in the national Swedish Riksdag since the elections of 1988. The last new party on the city council was New Democracy, a new right-wing party which also entered the Riksdag for the first time in this year.

As a result, a total of nine political parties were represented on the Stockholm City Council after this election, the most at any point as of the 2006 elections.

The Social Democrats were allocated 33 seats as a result of this election, which at the time was their lowest mandate since the introduction of universal male suffrage in 1911.

== Results ==
Party	Votes			Seats	
Party	#	%	+ –	#	+ –
Social Democrats; Socialdemokraterna (s)	130,259	29.4%	–4.5%	33	–3
Moderate Party; Moderata samlingspartiet (m)	129,253	29.2%	+1.7%	32	+4
Liberal People's Party; Folkpartiet liberalerna (fp)	44,769	10.1%	–2.5%	12	–1
Left Party; Vänsterpartiet (v)	35,650	8.0%	–2.1%	9	–2
New Democracy; Ny demokrati (nyd)	21,641	4.9%		6	+6
Stockholm Party; Stockholmspartiet (sp)	18,475	4.2%		3	-5
Green Party; Miljöpartiet (mp)	17,275	3.9%	+1.5%	2	+2
Christian Democratic; Kristdemokratiska samhällspartiet (kd)	16,898	3.8%	+2.3%	3	+3
Centre Party; Centerpartiet (c)	15,543	3.5%	–0.5%	1	–4
Others	13,154	3.0%			
Total	442,153	100%	—	101	±0
Invalid ballots	6,095				

== See also ==
- Elections in Sweden
- List of political parties in Sweden
- City of Stockholm
