= 2002 Swedish general election =

- 15 September 2002

All 349 seats in the Riksdag 175 seats needed for a majority
- Registered: 6,722,152
- Turnout: 80.11% (▼1.27 pp)
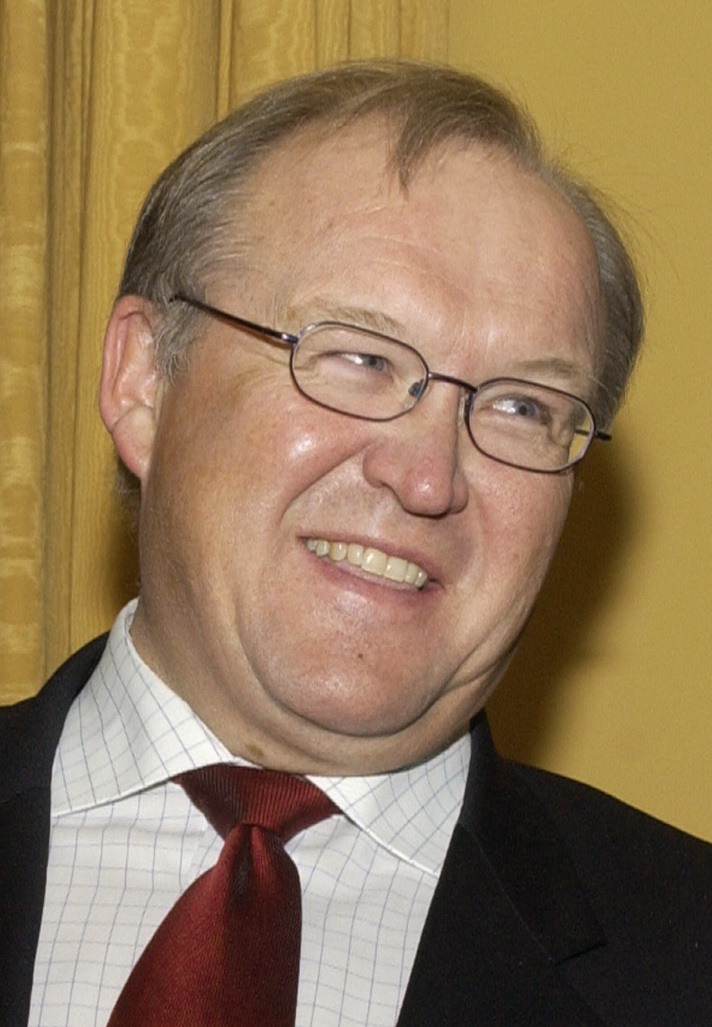

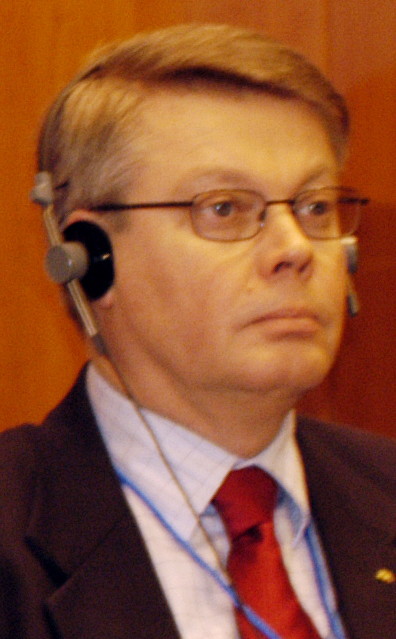

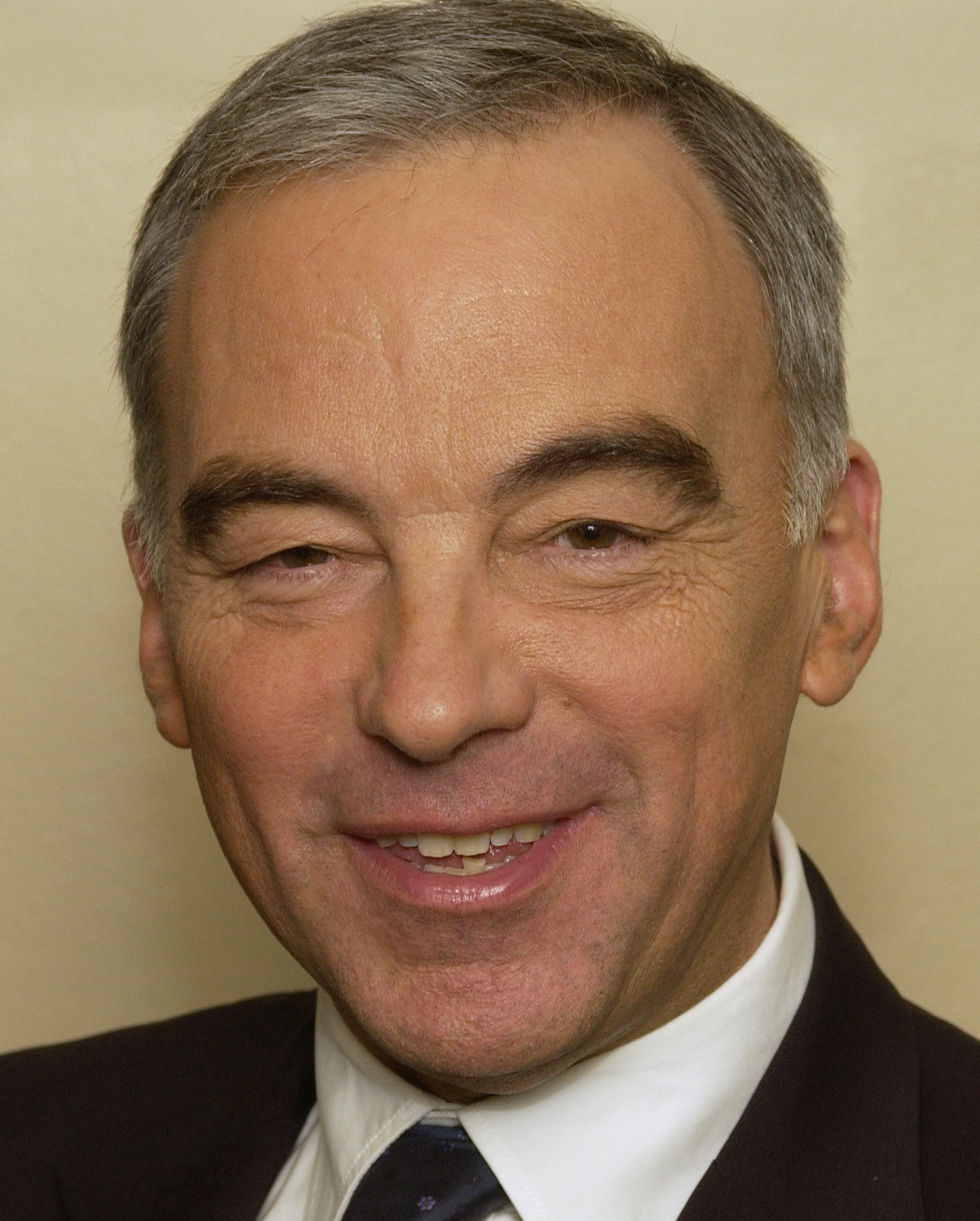

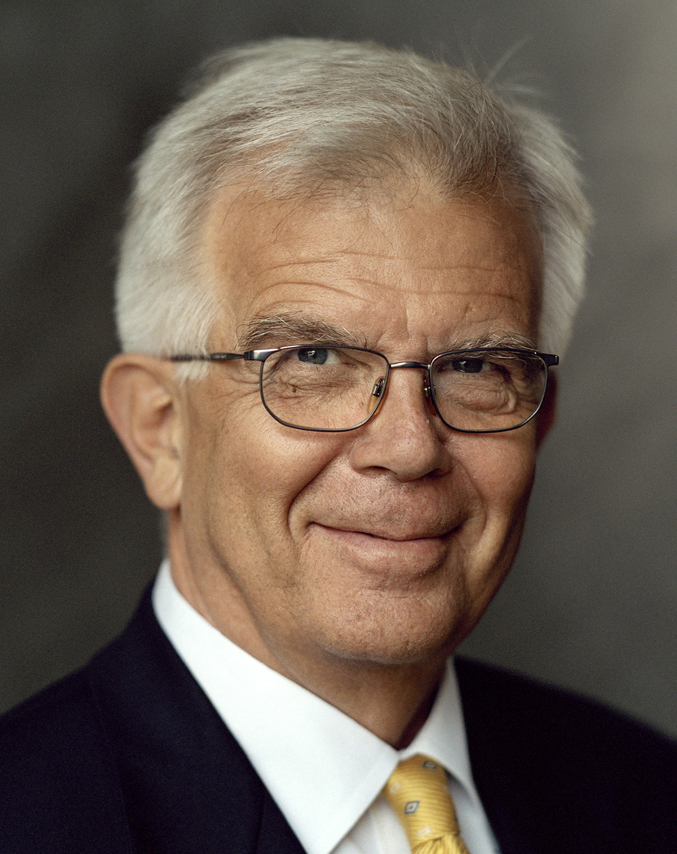

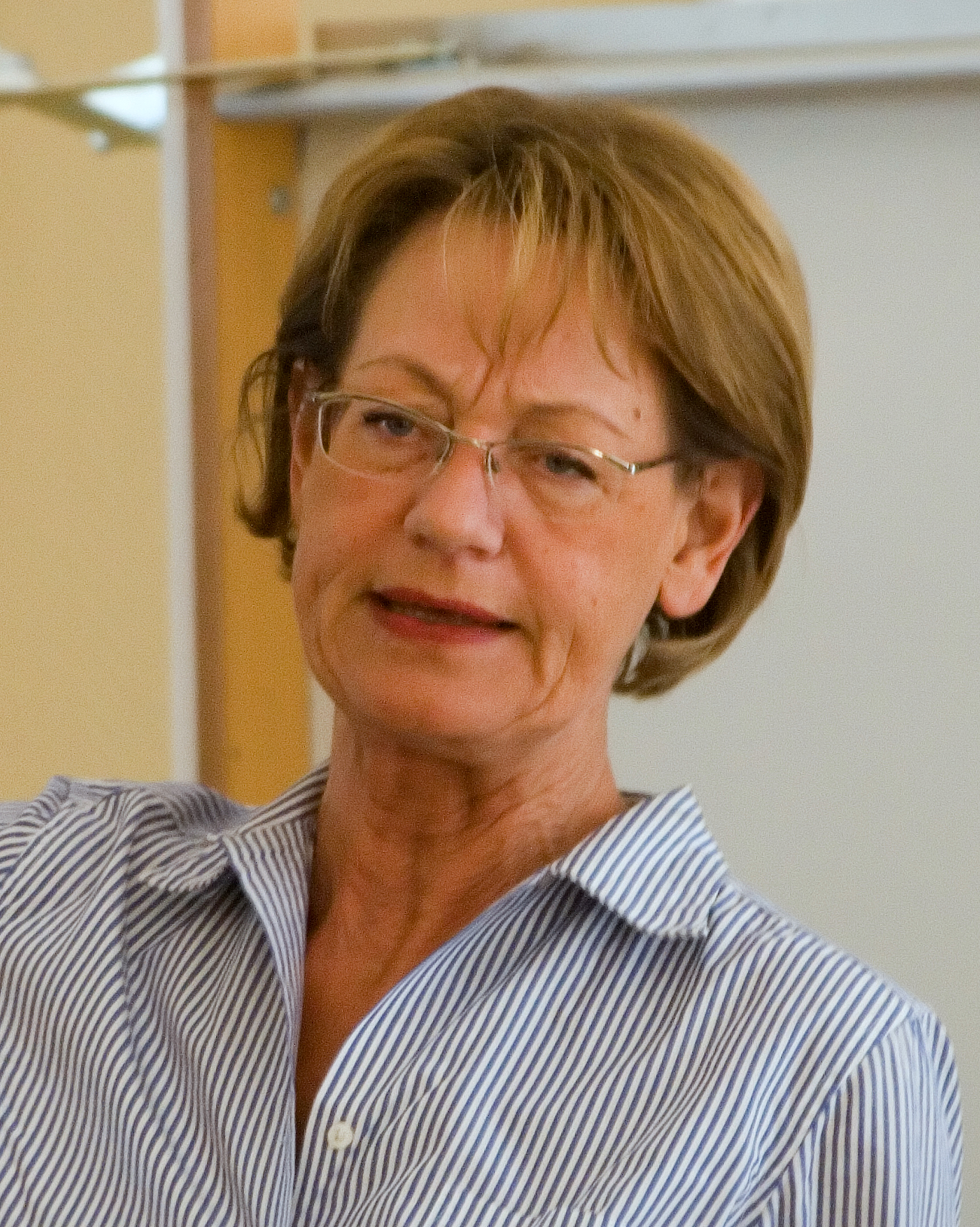

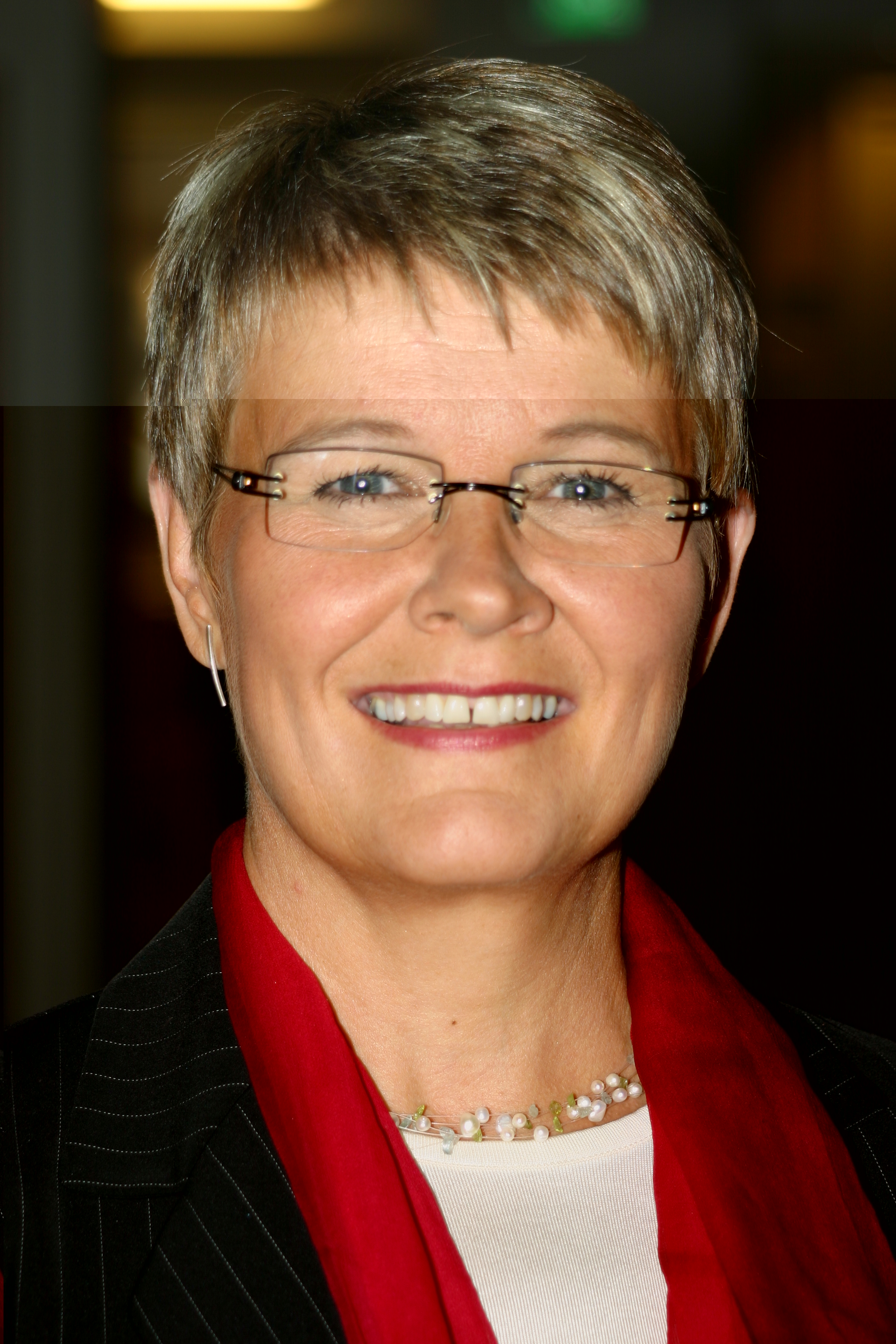

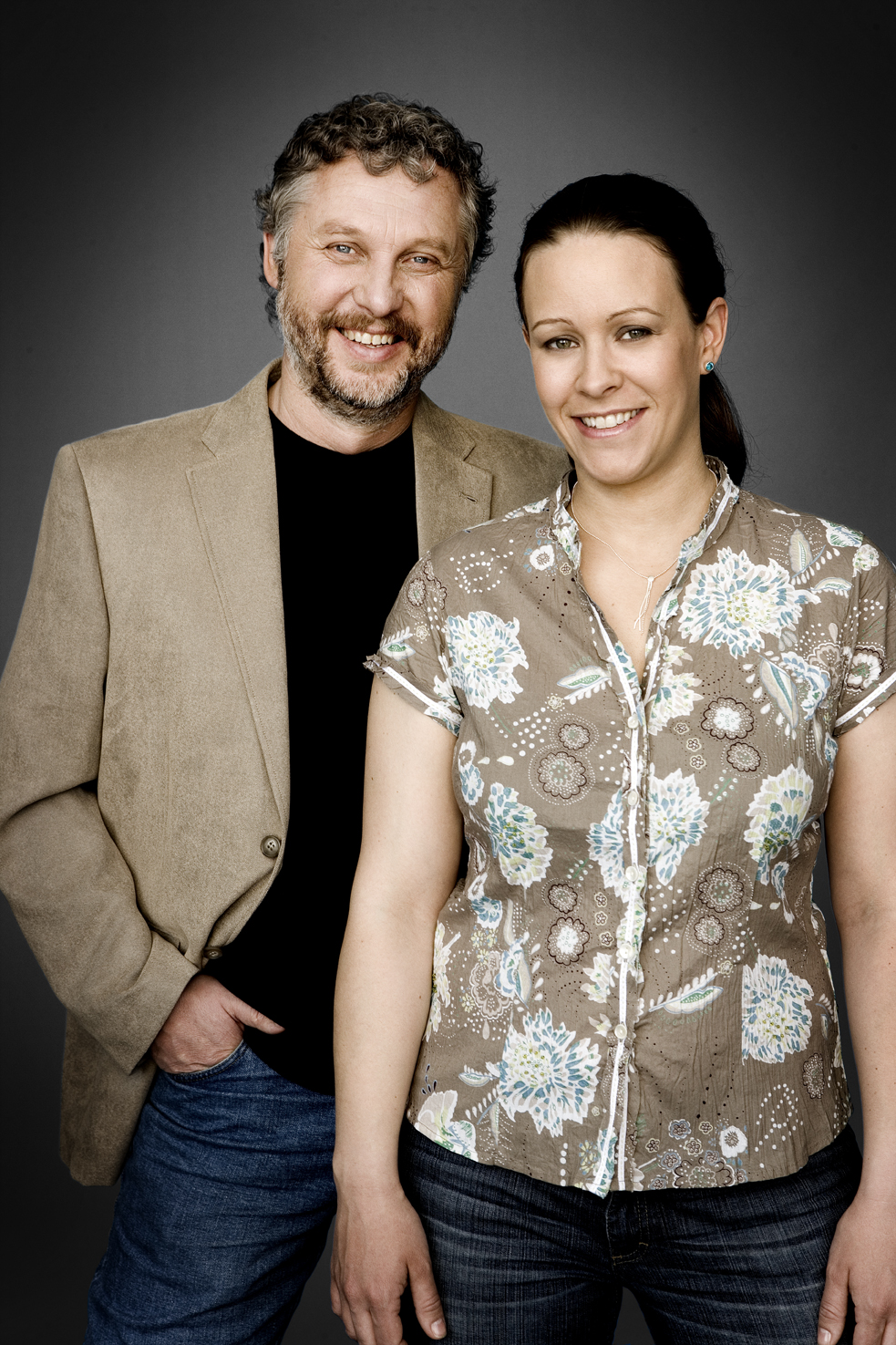
	First party	Second party	Third party
Leader	Göran Persson	Bo Lundgren	Lars Leijonborg
Party	Social Democrats	Moderate	Liberals
Alliance	Centre-left	Centre-right	Centre-right
Last election	131 seats	82 seats	17 seats
Seats won	144	55	48
Seat change	▲13	▼27	▲31
Popular vote	2,113,560	809,041	710,312
Percentage	39.9%	15.3%	13.4%
Swing	▲3.5 pp	▼7.6 pp	▲8.7 pp
	Fourth party	Fifth party	Sixth party
Leader	Alf Svensson	Gudrun Schyman	Maud Olofsson
Party	Christian Democrats	Left	Centre
Alliance	Centre-right	Centre-left	Centre-right
Last election	42 seats	43 seats	18 seats
Seats won	33	30	22
Seat change	▼9	▼13	▲4
Popular vote	485,235	444,854	328,428
Percentage	9.2%	8.4%	6.2%
Swing	▼2.6 pp	▼3.6 pp	▲1.1 pp
	Seventh party
Leader	Peter Eriksson; Maria Wetterstrand
Party	Green
Alliance	Centre-left
Last election	16 seats
Seats won	17
Seat change	▲1
Popular vote	246,392
Percentage	4.7%
Swing	▲0.2 pp
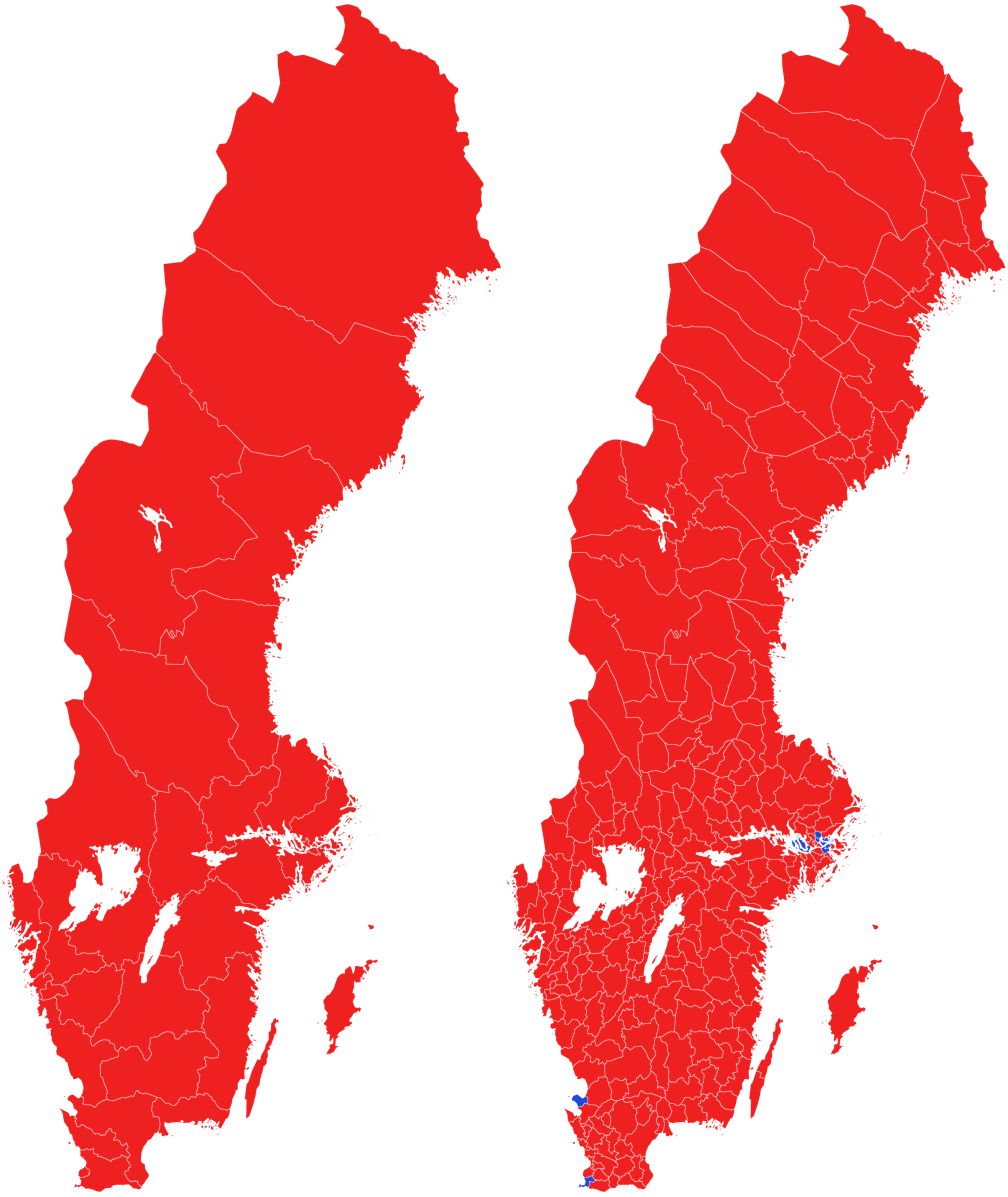
PM before election
Göran Persson
Social Democrats
Elected PM
Göran Persson
Social Democrats

General elections were held in Sweden on 15 September 2002, alongside municipal and county council elections. The Swedish Social Democratic Party remained the largest party in the Riksdag, winning 144 of the 349 seats.

After securing a confidence and supply agreement with the Left Party and the Green Party, Prime Minister Göran Persson was able to remain in his position for a third consecutive term as a minority government.

Although the bloc compositions were similar to 1998, the complexions of the centre-right bloc shifted radically. Under new party leader Bo Lundgren, the Moderates lost more than seven percentage points and barely held on as the largest party in its coalition. Only eight municipalities in all of Sweden had the Moderates as the largest party, six of which were in the Stockholm area. The Peoples' Party led by Lars Leijonborg, instead more than doubled its parliamentary delegation and received above 13% of the vote. Lundgren resigned in the wake of the election, leading to the selection of future Prime Minister Fredrik Reinfeldt as the Moderate leader.

Among the four other Riksdag parties, the Christian Democrats and the Left Party both lost ground, whereas the Centre and Green parties managed to reach the parliamentary threshold of four percentage points.

Among minor parties, the Norrbotten Party reached 9.4% of the vote in its county, polling above 20% in some inland areas. However, this was not enough to gain a Riksdag seat. The Sweden Democrats became the eight largest party for the first time, making sizeable gains and winning more council seats than ever before.

== Debates ==
2002 Swedish general election debates
Date	Time	Organizers	Moderators	P Present I Invitee N Non-invitee							
Date	Time	Organizers	Moderators	S	M	V	KD	C	L	MP	Refs
13 Sep		Sveriges Television	Stina Lundberg; Erik Fichtelius	P Göran Persson	P Bo Lundgren	P Gudrun Schyman	P Alf Svensson	P Maud Olofsson	P Lars Leijonborg	P Peter Eriksson	

== Results ==
Party	Votes	%	Seats	+/–
Swedish Social Democratic Party	2,113,560	39.85	144	+13
Moderate Party	809,041	15.26	55	−27
Liberal People's Party	710,312	13.39	48	+31
Christian Democrats	485,235	9.15	33	−9
Left Party	444,854	8.39	30	−13
Centre Party	328,428	6.19	22	+4
Green Party	246,392	4.65	17	+1
Sweden Democrats	76,300	1.44	0	0
Swedish Senior Citizen Interest Party	37,573	0.71	0	0
Norrbotten Party	14,854	0.28	0	–
New Future	9,337	0.18	0	0
Scania Party	4,564	0.09	0	–
National Democrats	4,122	0.08	0	–
Socialist Party	3,213	0.06	0	0
Socialist Justice Party	1,519	0.03	0	0
Communist Party	1,182	0.02	0	0
Unity	603	0.01	0	0
Free List	274	0.01	0	–
Voice of the Free People	207	0.00	0	–
European Workers Party	163	0.00	0	–
New Democracy	106	0.00	0	0
Welfare Party	94	0.00	0	–
National Democratic Party	87	0.00	0	–
Alliance Party	58	0.00	0	–
Skåne Federalists	52	0.00	0	–
Communist League	46	0.00	0	–
Citizens Party	27	0.00	0	–
National Householders	17	0.00	0	–
Republicans	15	0.00	0	–
Tax Reformists	14	0.00	0	–
Popular Democrats	12	0.00	0	–
New Swedes D.P.N.S.	11	0.00	0	–
Donald Duck Party	10	0.00	0	–
Party of Love	8	0.00	0	–
Populist Party	8	0.00	0	–
Blank Voters Party-A Political Marking	7	0.00	0	–
Sports Party	7	0.00	0	–
Preschool Party - Children's Voice	6	0.00	0	–
God-Trolls-Witches-Beings and Cosmic Powers Party	4	0.00	0	–
ATP Pensions And Widows' Pensions Party	4	0.00	0	–
Singles Party-Sorry, but we exist too	3	0.00	0	–
Cloning, no Thanks I am a Unique Person Party	3	0.00	0	–
Animal Welfare Party-A Loving Life for our Animals	3	0.00	0	–
Beach Protection Party	3	0.00	0	–
Viking Party-Sweden Out of the EU	2	0.00	0	–
Dog Party-The Dog, Man's Best Friend	2	0.00	0	–
Shaman's Indigenous Party	2	0.00	0	–
Crisis	1	0.00	0	–
Dust Online	1	0.00	0	–
Santa Party: Children's and Animals' Best Friend	1	0.00	0	–
Dentist High Cost Party	1	0.00	0	–
Land we Inherited Party	1	0.00	0	–
The Boiled Frog Dance Party. The Swedish Man Today	1	0.00	0	–
Football Party	1	0.00	0	–
Other parties	10,861	0.20	0	–
Total	5,303,212	100.00	349	0
Valid votes	5,303,212	98.47		
Invalid/blank votes	82,218	1.53		
Total votes	5,385,430	100.00		
Registered voters/turnout	6,722,152	80.11		
Source: Val

=== Seat distribution ===
Constituency	Total seats	Seats won								
Constituency	Total seats	By party							By coalition	
Constituency	Total seats	S	M	F	KD	V	C	MP	Red-green	Right
Blekinge	6	3	1	1	1				3	3
Dalarna	11	5	1	1	1	1	1	1	7	4
Gävleborg	11	5	1	1	1	1	1	1	7	4
Gothenburg	18	6	3	4	2	2		1	9	9
Gotland	2	2							2	
Halland	11	4	2	2	1	1	1		5	6
Jämtland	6	3	1			1	1		4	2
Jönköping	13	5	2	1	3	1	1		6	7
Kalmar	9	4	1	1	1	1	1		5	4
Kronoberg	7	3	1	1	1		1		3	4
Malmö	9	5	2	1		1			6	3
Norrbotten	11	6	1	1	1	1		1	8	3
Örebro	11	5	1	1	1	1	1	1	7	4
Östergötland	17	7	3	2	2	1	1	1	9	8
Skåne North and East	11	5	2	1	1	1	1		6	5
Skåne South	14	5	3	2	1	1	1	1	7	7
Skåne West	10	4	2	2	1	1			5	5
Södermanland	11	5	1	1	1	1	1	1	7	4
Stockholm County	39	13	9	8	3	3	1	2	18	21
Stockholm Municipality	29	9	7	6	2	3		2	14	15
Uppsala	12	4	2	2	1	1	1	1	6	6
Värmland	11	5	1	1	1	1	1	1	7	4
Västerbotten	11	5	1	1	1	1	1	1	7	4
Västernorrland	10	5	1	1	1	1	1		6	4
Västmanland	10	5	1	1	1	1	1		6	4
Västra Götaland East	9	4	1	1	1	1	1		5	4
Västra Götaland North	10	4	1	1	1	1	1	1	6	4
Västra Götaland South	7	3	1	1	1		1		3	4
Västra Götaland West	13	5	2	2	1	1	1	1	7	6
Total	349	144	55	48	33	30	22	17	191	158
Source: Statistics Sweden

=== By municipality ===
Votes by municipality. The municipalities are the color of the party that got the most votes within the coalition that won relative majority.

Cartogram of the map to the left with each municipality rescaled to the number of valid votes cast.

Map showing the voting shifts from the 1998 to the 2002 election. Darker blue indicates a municipality voted more towards the parties that formed the centre-right bloc. Darker red indicates a municipality voted more towards the parties that form the left-wing bloc.

Votes by municipality as a scale from red/Left-wing bloc to blue/Centre-right bloc.

Cartogram of vote with each municipality rescaled in proportion to number of valid votes cast. Deeper blue represents a relative majority for the centre-right coalition, brighter red represents a relative majority for the left-wing coalition.
