= 2006 Stockholm municipal election =

2006 election in Sweden

The 2006 Stockholm municipal election was held on 17 September 2006, concurrently with the 2006 Swedish general election. The election determined how many seats each party would be allocated on the 101-member Stockholm city council (Stockholms kommunfullmäktige) thorough a system of proportional representation. A total of 490,869 votes were cast in this election, for a total voter turnout of 79.1%

== Opinion polling ==
Table key:
Left Party	Liberal People's Party
Social Democrats	Moderate Party
Green Party	Christian Democrats
Centre Party	

Polling period	Polster	(v)	(s)	(mp)	(c)	(fp)	(m)	(kd)	Others	Undecided
15 Sep 2002	Previous election	11.2%	32.1%	5.3%	1.3%	15.8%	26.0%	4.4%	3.9%	—
21 Sep – 25 Sep 2003	Synovate	11.1%	28.2%	5.7%	1.5%	18.7%	29.7%	3.8%	1.3%	11.6%
22 Sep – 27 Sep 2004	Synovate	9.4%	27.8%	5.8%	1.6%	16.5%	34.9%	1.8%	2.1%	11.3%
19 Apr – 25 Apr 2005	Synovate	6.2%	21.5%	7.0%	1.0%	15.1%	44.1%	2.3%	2.9%	14.1%
28 Feb – 7 Mar 2006	Synovate	8.3%	28.1%	5.8%	1.9%	12.3%	38.5%	2.9%	2.1%	17.9%
16 Aug – 27 Aug 2006	Synovate	7.6%	26.5%	7.8%	2.3%	13.9%	36.0%	3.5%	2.4%	17.6%

== Results ==
Party	Votes		Seats	
Party	%	+ –	#	+ –
Moderate Party; Moderaterna	37.25%	+11.24	41	+14
Social Democrats; Socialdemokraterna	24.42%	–7.68	27	–8
People's Party; Folkpartiet	9.64%	–6.15	10	–7
Green Party; Miljöpartiet	9.20%	+3.86	10	+4
Left Party; Vänsterpartiet	7.91%	–3.29	9	–2
Christian Democrats; Kristdemokraterna	3.91%	–0.54	3	–2
Centre Party; Centerpartiet	3.14%	+1.87	1	+1
Other parties	4.53%	+0.69	0	±0

== See also ==
- Elections in Sweden
- List of political parties in Sweden
- City of Stockholm
