= FUTURO =

- Co-leaders: Gerlien Croes; Geoffrey Wever
- Founder: Gerlien Croes
- Founded: September 2024
- Colours: Pink; Teal
- Parliament of Aruba: 3 / 21

Website
- futuroaruba.com

FUTURO is a political party in Aruba that currently has three members of the Parliament of Aruba since the December 2024 general election, and is in government in Aruba.

== History ==
FUTURO was founded in September 2024 by Gerlien Croes, an MP who was formerly affiliated with the Aruban People's Party (AVP; Dutch: Arubaanse Volkspartij, Papiamento: Partido di Pueblo Arubano) and had been sitting as an independent prior to launching FUTURO. In the December 2024 Aruban general election, the party put forward ten candidates, and won 13.2% of the vote and three seats, becoming the third largest political party in the Parliament.

Following the election, FUTURO and the AVP started negotiations for entering government together. These negotiations were successful, and in March 2025, the AVP-FUTURO coalition government was sworn in.

== Ideology ==
The party has been described as having an appeal to younger voters, and for having a focus on reforms to health care and modernising education.

== Leadership ==
The party has a co-leadership structure, with Croes and Geoffrey Wever, a former RAIZ politician, serving as the party's co-leaders.

== Election results ==
=== Aruba general elections ===
Election	Leader	Votes	%	Seats	+/–	Status
2024	Gerlien Croes; Geoffrey Wever	7,349	13.24 (#3)	3 / 21	▲3	Coalition
