= 1976 Stockholm municipal election =

Swedish local election

The Stockholm municipal election of 1976 was held on 19 September 1976 concurrently with the 1976 Swedish parliamentary election. This election used a party-list proportional representation system to allocate the 101 seats of the Stockholm city council (Stockholms stadsfullmäktige) amongst the various Swedish political parties. Voter turnout was 88.1%.

== Results ==
Party	Votes			Seats	
Party	#	%	+ –	#	+ –
Social Democrats; Socialdemokraterna (s)	189,284	39.3%	-0.1%	40	–2
Moderate Party; Moderata samlingspartiet (m)	119,974	24.9%	+1.7	27	+4
People's Party; Folkpartiet (fp)	63,894	13.3%	+1.6%	13	+1
Centre Party; Centerpartiet (c)	55,037	11.4%	–2.6%	12	–3
Left Party Communists; Vänsterpartiet kommunisterna (v)	42,648	8.9%	–0.1%	9	±0
Christian Democratic; Kristdemokratiska samhällspartiet (kds)	4,871	1.0%	–0.1%	0	±0
Other parties	6132	1.3%	–0.4	0	±0
Total	481,840	100%	—	101	±0
Invalid ballots	2,373				

== See also ==
- Elections in Sweden
- List of political parties in Sweden
- City of Stockholm
