= Workers' Party (Sweden) =

Workers' Party Arbetarpartiet
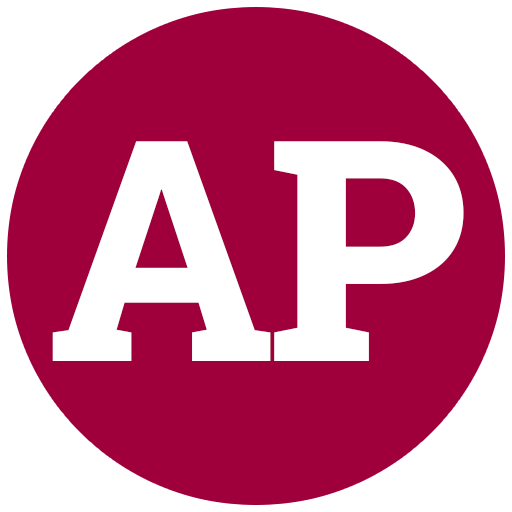
- Abbreviation: AP; ArP
- Leader: Jan Hägglund
- Founded: 16 March 2010
- Split from: Socialist Justice Party
- Headquarters: Umeå
- Newspaper: Veckans Nyheter
- Youth wing: Socialistisk Ungdom
- Ideology: Democratic socialism Marxism; Secularism
- Political position: Left-wing
- Colours: Red

Website
- arbetarpartiet.se

The Workers' Party (Swedish: Arbetarpartiet) is a democratic socialist political party in Sweden. It was founded in 2010, when almost the entire Västerbotten County section of the Socialist Justice Party (RS) broke off ahead of the 2010 general election. It adopted the name Rättvisepartiet Socialisterna, enhetslista för jobb - mot nedskärningar (Socialist Justice Party, Unity list for jobs - against cutbacks) for its party list. In early 2011, it was renamed to the Workers' Party. It currently holds two seats in the municipal assembly of Umeå (since 2014). The Workers' Party publishes the Weekly News (Veckans Nyheter).

== Politics ==
The party labels itself democratic socialist. The goal is to participate in building a new workers' party that establishes democratic control over the capitalist financial institutions and corporations that direct the economy.

Party members have a history of conducting policies that benefit workers employed in public services such as healthcare and elderly care. Elderly care workers and party members cooperated in organising four waves of warning strikes against cutbacks in 2000, 2001 and 2005. Since the 2010 elections, a regular part in the party's policies has been to push for the need for investment in green industrial production.

Before the 2018 municipal election, the city of Umeå introduced a mandatory 3% electoral threshold, labeled by critics as an attempt to target particularly the Workers' Party and the Feminist Initiative, which both held under 4% of electoral support. The party, however, strengthened its electoral support with nearly 3.6% and held its two seats.
