= Independents of Hällefors =

Former local political party in Sweden

Independents of Hällefors Hällefors Oberoende
- Founder: Mats Runqvist
- Founded: 1994
- Dissolved: 2014
- Municipal council (2010): 4 / 31

Independents of Hällefors (in Swedish: Hällefors Oberoende) was a local political party in Hällefors Municipality, Sweden. It was led by Mats Runqvist. The party won their first seat in the municipal council in 1994. At the 2002 municipal elections the party got 6 seats out of 31, and became the second largest party in the municipal council.

In the 2010 municipal elections the party received 13.55% of the vote, resulting in 4 seats for the party. After the 2010 election the party formed a governing coalition with the Social Democratic, Centre and Left parties, but left the coalition in 2012. The party did not run in the 2014 election, and is defunct today.

The party sponsored the local ice hockey team Hällefors IK.
