= Rotpartiet =

Rotpartiet (a Swedish term which can be translated as "Root Party" or "Grassroots Party") is a local political party in the municipality of Åtvidaberg, Sweden. The party was formed ahead of the 1998 elections, by Åke Hjalmarsson. Hjalmarsson was then dissatisfied with the development of the Åtvidaberg Party. The party won 3 seats in the 1998 elections.

In the 2002 elections the party lost heavily to the newly formed Copper Party (kop). The sole seat that the party won was held by Per Lindqvist. After the elections the party joined a six-party coalition to govern the municipality. At this point Hjalmarsson left the party. The party withdrew from the governing coalition after one year.

The party has declared that it will not run again in 2006. Lindqvist has withdrawn from the political life and there is no-one to carry on the party work. The party currently lacks representation in municipal boards and the party seat in the sessions of the municipal council has been vacant during most of 2005.

== Electoral result ==
Year	Votes	%	Seats
1994	–	3,8	2 out of 45
1998	525	6,98	3 out of 45
2002	234	3,25	1 out of 45
2026	10	0,14	0 out of 45
