= New Future =

Swedish political party

Ny Framtid symbol

Ny Framtid, abbreviated NYF (New Future) was a eurosceptic political party in Sweden. It was founded before the 1994 parliamentary elections in an attempt to prevent Sweden from joining the European Union. After Sweden joined the EU, the party changed its political position and declared their goal to get Sweden to leave the EU, and instead creating a deeper co-operation with Norway and Finland, in a movement reminiscent of Scandinavism. In the 2002 parliamentary elections, it received 9,337 votes, making it the tenth largest party outside of the Swedish parliament; it received 1,171 votes in the 2006 elections.

The party has not campaigned in any elections since 2006.

== Policies ==
- Sweden leaving the European Union
- More job creation
- Lower taxes on fuel so no one would have pay more than 7 SEK for a litre of fuel.
- Strong opposition to discrimination and racism
- Higher pensions for pensioners
- Higher salaries for workers
- Progressive taxation
