= Falu Party =

Falu Party Falupartiet
- Leader: Ulf Elgemyr
- Headquarters: Garvaregatan 2B, Falun
- Ideology: Local interest

Website
- home.swipnet.se/falupartiet

The Falu Party (Swedish: Falupartiet) a local political party in Falun, Sweden. Party leader is Ulf Elgemyr.

In 1998, FP got 10.9% of the votes and six seats in the municipal council. In 2002 it got 2441 votes (7.5%) and five seats.

Between 1998 and 2002, FP was part of a local six-party coalition governing the municipality, consisting of FP, Moderate Party, Centre Party, Christian Democrats, People's Party - Liberals and Swedish Senior Citizen Interest Party.

Examples of current demand of the party include (from the party website):

- Social Services to remain in its present location
- No extra funding for the Folk Music Festival
- New courthouse, but not on Kullen
- More attention to the situation of children and youth
- Law and order, support the work to increase police resources
- Supports construction of nine-hole golf-course in Linghed
- Supports restoration of fire station in Enviken
- Opposes decay of buildings in Sågmyra
- Smother traffic in the centre, open Åsgatan- Kristinegatan for one-way traffic.
- Raise a statue of Nobel Laureate Selma Lagerlöf
- Well-functioning school and good elderly care.
