= Carl P. Herslow =

Swedish politician

Carl P. Herslow (born 14 November 1943) is a Swedish politician and leader of the Scania Party. He is supporter of the separation of Scania from Sweden and the creation of an independent republic.

== Mohammed poster controversy ==
In 2010 the Scania Party produced a poster depicting a naked Muhammed with a naked Aisha holding a doll, and the slogan "He is 53 and she is nine. Is this the kind of wedding we want to see in Skåne?". 20 copies of the poster were display and then seized by authorities. In March 2011 Herslow was tried for agitation against an ethnic group. A jury found him not guilty, and he was formally acquitted on 16 March 2011.

In 2013, Carl Herslow's house was raided by the police, and he was brought to trial and sentenced to a fine for copyright infringement. In his anti-Islamic book Om islam - till all världens 9-åringar, he used the information of another author without reference to the original source.

Despite the weakening of the positions of his party, Carl Herslow remains convinced that Scania will become independent. He goes out on pickets, makes public statements, participates in party events.
