= Revolutionary Workers' League of Sweden =

- Founded: 1921
- Dissolved: 1983
- Newspaper: Röda Fanan/Proletär Offensiv
- Ideology: Communism; Marxism; Trotskyism; Socialism
- International affiliation: International League for the Reconstruction of the Fourth International

Revolutionary Workers League of Sweden (in Swedish: Sveriges Revolutionära Arbetarförbund), initially known as Revolutionary Workers League (Revolutionära Arbetares Förbund), was Trotskyist organisation in Sweden. The group was formed in 1975.

SRAF was the Swedish section of the International League for the Reconstruction of the Fourth International.

SRAF published Röda Fanan. In 1976, the name of the publication was changed to Proletär Offensiv. In total, around 60 issues were published 1976–1983.

SRAF was dissolved in 1983.
