= Samernas Väl =

Political party in Jokkmokk Municipality, Norrbotten County, Sweden

Samernas Väl (SV) is a local political party in Jokkmokk Municipality, Norrbotten County, Sweden.

The party was founded by Jokkmokk sameförening during the 1950s and has participated in several local elections since then. It has also been represented in "kommunfullmäktige". In the municipal election of 2010 the party got 267 votes.

== Election results in Jokkmokk Municipality ==
| Year | Votes | Percent | Mandates |
|---|---|---|---|
| 1998 | 258 | 6.55 % | 4 of 35 mandat |
| 2002 | 209 | 5.87 % | 2 of 35 mandat |
| 2006 | 247 | 7.15 % | 2 of 31 mandat |
| 2010 | 267 | 7.85 % | 2 of 31 mandat |

== Sources ==
- Om Samernas Väl på samer.se, read 2012-04-09
- Valmyndigheten
