= Independent Democrats of the Municipality of Lindesberg =

Independent Democrats of the Municipality of Lindesberg (in Swedish: Lindesbergs kommuns Obundna Demokrater) was a local political party in Lindesberg, Sweden. The president of the party was Mats Lagerman.

The party entered local politics in 1991 when it won five seats in the local council.

In the 2002 municipal elections LOD got 722 votes (5.1%). It obtained two seats in the municipal council (down from three in 1998), represented by Lagerman and the 19-year-old Rebin Mostafa.

In 2005 the party was disbanded, when leadership decided to join the Social Democratic Party instead. The party did not run for office in the 2006 election.

LOD previously owned the domain www.lod.net.
