= Liberal Initiative (Sweden) =

Liberal Initiative Liberalt initiativ
- Abbreviation: LI
- Chairwoman: Malin Sjöberg Högrell
- Vice Chairman: Mohamad Hassan
- Secretary: Jennie Claesson
- Founders: Malin Sjöberg Högrel; Mohamad Hassan; Jennie Claesson
- Founded: 8 June 2026
- Split from: Liberals
- Ideology: Social liberalism
- Political position: Centre
- Colours: Purple
- Riksdag: 0 / 349
- European Parliament: 0 / 21
- County councils: 1 / 1,720
- Municipal councils: 2 / 12,614

Website
- linitiativ.se

The Liberal Initiative (Swedish: Liberalt initiativ; LI) is a Swedish social liberal political party based in Uppsala County. The party was launched on 8 June 2026 by several former Liberals members, including Malin Sjöberg Högrell, Jennie Claesson and Mohamad Hassan.

In the 2026 election cycle, the party is running in Uppsala regional council election and in the municipal council elections in Uppsala, Enköping and Knivsta.

== History ==
The background to the party formation was a conflict within the Liberals about the party's relationship with the Sweden Democrats. On 13 March 2026, several Liberal regional and municipal councillors in Uppsala (Mohamad Hassan, Malin Sjöberg Högrell, Jennie Claesson) announced that they were withdrawing their candidacies after the Liberals opened up to form a government together with the Sweden Democrats. Sjöberg Högrell, who was then regional councilor and chairwoman of Liberal Women in Uppsala, also left the post of chairwoman of the Liberals' county association but remained as regional councilor for the remainder of her mandate.

On 8 June 2026, Sjöberg Högrell, Claesson and Hassan launched the Liberal Initiative. Former liberal politicians in Enköping and Knivsta also joined the new party. Sjöberg Högrell described the party as a classic social liberal centre party and said that its long-term goal was gaining representation in the Riksdag. However, the party decided to focus on the three municipal elections and the regional election in Uppsala County.

== Ideology ==
The party describes itself as socially liberal and a centrist political force. Ahead of the 2026 elections, the party organized its program under five overarching areas: social initiatives and education, gender equality, welfare, environment and community planning, and culture and civil society.

== Reactions ==
Eva Edwardsson, the Liberal Party's top candidate in Uppsala Municipality, said after the IL launch that she did not see the new party as a threat and that it was positive to have more liberal parties. In an editorial in Bohusläningen, Mimmie Björnsdotter Grönkvist questioned the party's description of a political void in the middle and assessed that a new small liberal party would have limited opportunities for influence.
