= Citizens Party: School – Health Care – Care =

Citizens Party: School - Health Care - Care Medborgarpartiet: skola - vård - omsorg
- Leader: Göran Berglund
- Founded: 1998
- Ideology: Local interest

Website
- http://pub.hultsfred.se/msvo/

Citizens Party: School – Health Care – Care (Swedish: Medborgarpartiet: skola - vård - omsorg) is a local political party in Hultsfred, Sweden. The party is led by Göran Berglund. The party was founded in 1998.
