= Berg Party =

- Founded: 2002
- Dissolved: 2013
- Ideology: Regionalism; Localism

Berg Party (Swedish: Bergspartiet) was a local political party in Berg, Sweden, formed by Olle Nord, previously a local leader of the Centre Party, prior to the 2002 elections.

BP swept the 2002 municipal polls. It got 1,959 votes (41.3%) and 16 out of 39 seats. BP is currently leading the municipal government.
