= RAIZ =

ROOTS RAIZ
- Leader: Ursell Arends
- Chairman: Maximino Wernet
- Founders: Tai-Foo Lee, Ursell Arends
- Founded: 9 June 2017
- Ideology: Social democracy Progressivism
- Political position: Centre-left
- Colours: Dark blue Green
- Slogan: Sembrando Futuro
- Parliament of Aruba: 0 / 21

Website
- raizaruba.com

RAIZ (lit. 'Roots') is an Aruban political party. The party was founded on 9 June 2017 by Tai-Foo Lee and Ursell Arends, the latter of whom is also the party leader. Raiz is a middle-class party with a progressive, social-democratic slant. It aims to distinguish itself from the traditional parties through innovative campaign and political culture. The party's spearheads are public finances and transparency of governance.

== Participation in elections ==
RAIZ debuted in the state elections of 2017 and was the first Aruban political party to also present a calculation of its party program. With a list of five candidates, the party obtained 2,107 votes, but was 82 votes short for a state seat. Between 2017 and 2021, it remained active as an extra-parliamentary party. RAIZ managed to secure two state seats in the 2021 elections amazing; it has since become the third largest party in Aruba with 5,430 votes.

== Election results ==
=== Aruba general elections ===
Election	Leader	Votes	%	Seats	+/–	Status
2017	Ursell Arends	2,107	3.59 (#5)	0 / 21	New	Extra-parliamentary
2021	Ursell Arends	5,474	9.34 (#3)	2 / 21	▲2	Coalition
2024	Ursell Arends	2,323	4.19 (#5)	0 / 21	▼2	Extra-parliamentary
