= S-Alternative =

Splinter group of the Social Democrats in Pajala, Sweden

S-Alternativet

S-Alternative (in Swedish: S-Alternativet) is a splinter group of the Social Democrats in Pajala, Sweden.
