= Independent Rural Party =

Swedish political party

Independent Rural Party Landsbygdspartiet Oberoende
- Abbreviation: LPo
- Leader: Benneth Thyr
- Chairperson: Benneth Thyr
- Ideology: Agrarianism; Euroscepticism
- Riksdag: 0 / 349
- Municipal council seats: 27 / 12,700

Website
- landsbygdspartiet.org

The Independent Rural Party (Swedish: Landsbygdspartiet Oberoende, lit. 'Independent Countryside Party') is a Swedish agrarian and Eurosceptic political party founded in 2010 which focuses on politics for rural areas.

Benneth Thyr was elected as the chairperson and party leader in April 2024.

== Election results ==
=== Riksdag ===
Year	Votes	%	Seats	+/–	Government
2010	1,565	0.03 (#12)	0 / 349	New	Extra-parliamentary
2014	3,450	0.06 (#15)	0 / 349	0	Extra-parliamentary
2018	4,962	0.08 (#14)	0 / 349	0	Extra-parliamentary
2022	2,215	0.03 (#17)	0 / 349	0	Extra-parliamentary
2026	577	0.01 (#20)	0 / 349	0	Extra-parliamentary

=== Local elections ===
Since 2022, the party is represented in nine municipalities, having lost representation in four municipalities (Härjedalen, Luleå, Söderköping and Vansbro) in the same year's local elections, they increased their support in Nora, Malung-Sälen, Sollefteå and Valdemarsvik. The party has also taken part in the general elections in 2010, 2014, 2018 and 2022 but with limited results. The party received 0.06% of the vote in the 2014 general election, and 0.08% in the 2018 general election.

At its party congress on 16 April 2019, Stefan Torssell was appointed as party leader.

The party holds a total of 27 seats in the following municipalities:

Municipal seats (2022)
Municipality	Seats
Nora	5 of 35
Valdemarsvik	5 of 35
Svenljunga	4 of 33
Malung-Sälen	4 of 39
Kinda	3 of 35
Uppvidinge	2 of 35
Lindesberg	2 of 45
Askersund	1 of 33
Sollefteå	1 of 45

== European Parliament election, 2019 ==
LpO contested the 2019 election to the European Parliament with six candidates. The party received 0.05% of the vote.
