= Scania Party =

Scania Party Skånepartiet
- Chairman: Carl P. Herslow
- Founded: 24 March 1979
- Headquarters: Lieholmsvägen 303-22, Trelleborg
- Ideology: Scanian autonomism Right-wing populism Anti-communism; Economic liberalism Regionalism; Anti-Islam; Scandinavism
- Political position: Far-right
- Colours: Blue, white, yellow, red

Website
- www.skanepartiet.org

Skånepartiet ("the Scania party") is an autonomist, right-wing populist, regionalist, anti-immigration political party based in the Swedish province of Scania, established in 1979. The founder and leader of the party is Carl P. Herslow.

Initially, the party sought to abolish the monopoly of the Swedish state on the radio and television market and to establish self-government for Scania. It originally advocated for full independence for Scania as a republic, but later revised this stance to support devolution within the Swedish state. From the mid-1980s, the party began to criticize Swedish immigration policy and, since the 2000s, has focused extensively on a campaign against Islam. Its support has diminished over the years, culminating in the loss of its last local seats in the 2006 Swedish general election.

== History ==
The party was founded on 24 March 1979 in Lund. Based on the Scania Movement ("Skånerörelsen") founded in 1977, its initial main issues was to achieve regional autonomy for Scania, particularly regarding the mass media, alcohol, energy, tourism and education policy. It ran in the 1979 election on three main issues; a Scanian provincial government, an independent advertising-funded Scanian TV channel with broadcasting associations, and the free sale of beer, wine, and liquor in Scania. The election was however ultimately a failure for the party. It started local radio broadcasts in 1982. Although the party had put in much work for the 1982 election, it again failed to win any representation.

By 1984 the party reportedly had more than 4,000 members and had expanded its radio broadcasts. It had also become more radical, now demanding that Scania become an independent republic. The party also started to criticize the economic, social and cultural consequences of Swedish immigration policy. In the 1985 election the party finally broke through, and helped to remove the Social Democratic Party from power in Malmö for the first time in 66 years, winning five mandates. It also gained representation in a few other municipalities. In the 1988 election the party was reduced to three mandates in Malmö and lost its representation in all other municipalities except one. The party held municipal seats only in Malmö through the 1990s. In the late 2000s the party has failed to win any representation, and has been marginalized by the advancing Sweden Democrats in competition for votes. On June 30, 2020, in what was to be announced by Herslow as the final radio transmissions, it was revealed that both the party and the radio transmissions would be dissolved due to the lack of staff. However, on July 2 both the party and the radio transmissions was resumed.

== Policies ==
The party states on its website that its policy is based on the two main demands of "more restrictive immigration and refugee policies, and the elimination of Islam." It further promotes 12 key policies;

1. Scania to become a free republic, a member of the European Union and NATO
2. cessation of immigration of refugees and similar
3. Islam to be eliminated; Muslims must move to Sweden (i.e. out of Scania)
4. all pension promises to be unconditionally fulfilled
5. more money to healthcare, the elderly and disabled
6. utilize both reactors at the Barsebäck nuclear power plant
7. pupils must have respect for teachers and adults
8. better crimefighting by stricter sentencing and an increase in police numbers
9. liberalise the labour market, stop welfare fraud
10. reduce the tax burden when Scania's state debt is paid
11. abolish the state alcohol monopoly administered by Systembolaget
12. stop the "communist radio and television empire"

== Election results ==
=== Local representation ===
1985 election: 5 seats in Malmö, 2 in Burlöv, 2 in Svedala, 1 in Staffanstorp and 1 in Vellinge.

1988 election: 3 seats in Malmö and 1 in Staffanstorp.

1991 election: 2 seats in Malmö.

1994 election: 3 seats in Malmö.

1998 election: 2 seats in Malmö.

2002 election: 2 seats in Malmö.

2006 election: 0 seats.

2010 election: 0 seats.

2014 election: 0 seats (0.33% share of the votes for the Skåne County Council and 0.6% share of the votes in municipal elections)

2018 election: 0 seats

2022 election: 0 seats
