= Free Trade Party of Norrbotten =

- Headquarters: Haparanda
- Ideology: Classical liberalism Regionalism; Localism; Pro-Europeanism

Free Trade Party of Norrbotten (Swedish: Norrbottens Frihandelsparti) is a local political party in Haparanda, Sweden. The party is pro-European Union and supports those who cross the Finnish border to purchase goods at lower tax levels.

In the 2002 municipal polls, it got 248 votes (5.3%) and two seats.

== See also ==
- Finland–Sweden border
