= Unity (Swedish political party) =

Unity Enhet
- Leader: Vide Geiger
- Founded: 6 April 1990
- Ideology: Spiritual politics Pacifism; Environmentalism
- Political position: Left-wing
- Colours: Green

Website
- enhet.se

Unity (Swedish: Enhet) is a small political party in Sweden. The party was founded on 6 April 1990 on the initiative of Ulf Wåhlström. It started with some influences from New Age and spirituality, but is nowadays a political party mostly focused on the environment, an unconditional income floor with a basic income and alternative medicine. The party has taken part in every national election in Sweden since 1991, mostly with limited success. The 2014 general election was the party's best result so far, with 0.1% of the total votes. In the 2018 Swedish general election, the party received 0.06% of the total votes.

== History ==
Starting as a smaller movement in April 1990, on the initiative of Ulf Wåhlström, Enhet then turned into a political party shortly after. In the 2006 parliamentary elections the party got 2,648 votes (0.05%), up from 603 votes (0.01%) in the 2002 elections. However, in the 2010 Swedish general election the party only received 463 votes (0.01%); this was down from 2,616 votes or 0.04%. They rebounded somewhat in the 2014 parliamentary elections by getting a total of 6,277 votes or 0.10%.

== Political ideas ==
=== The economy ===
Enhet emphasizes the need for a sustainable economics with less consumption and pollution. They also believe in the need for structural changes to ascieve this. Two of their main proposals are a basic income (of some sort) and a land value tax.

=== Defence and foreign policy ===
Enhet's vision is a world without weapons. Hence they want global disarmament and for Sweden to take a leading role in this process. They also want Sweden out of the European Union and debt relief for poor countries.
