= Arjeplogs Fria Demokrater =

- Founded: 1976
- Dissolved: 2006
- Headquarters: Arjeplog
- Ideology: Big tent Regionalism; Localism

Arjeplogs Fria Demokrater was a local political party in Arjeplog Municipality, Sweden.

The party was founded in 1976, led by former Social Democratic politicians Börje Fjellström and Harry Johansson.

In the 2002 municipal polls, it got 157 votes (8.0%) and three seats (down from four in 1998). The party formed part of a local government coalition with the Social Democrats and Centre Party.

The party elected to dissolve ahead of the 2006 elections.
