= Vox Humana (political party) =

Voice of the People-VOX humana
- Abbreviation: VOXH
- President: Pelle Persson
- Founded: 4 January 1997
- Headquarters: Härjedalen
- Ideology: Regionalism; Localism; Humanism

Voice of the People – VOX humana (Swedish: Folkets Röst - VOX humana) is a local political party in Härjedalen, Sweden. The party was formed ahead of the 2002 elections. The party president is Pelle Persson.

The party has 75 members as of 2005.

In the 2002 municipal elections, it got 721 votes (10.8%) and five seats.
