= Alliance Party (Sweden) =

Alliance Party (in Swedish: Allianspartiet) is a political party in Sweden. The party was formed in the mid-1990s, as a splinter group of the right-wing populist New Democracy. Initially the party had branches in Skåne, Värmland and Östergötland, but its activities have been largely centered in Skåne.

In the 2002 elections, the party won two seats in the municipal council of Burlöv.

In 2006, the party contested municipal elections in Skåne, as well as the parliamentary election; in the latter election, they failed to win any seats.
