= Alternative (Ljungby) =

The Alternative
- Founded: 1994
- Ideology: Regionalism; Localism

The Alternative (Swedish: Alternativet) is a local political party in Ljungby Municipality, Sweden. Alternativet was founded in 1994. The party president is Roland Johansson, secretary Rune Arvidsson and treasurer Jörgen Källdalen.

In the 2002 municipal elections, Alternativet got 1,301 votes (8.0%) and four seats.
