= Popular Democrats (Sweden) =

Swedish political party

Popular Democrats (Swedish: Folkdemokraterna) is a small political party in Sweden.
