= Libertarian Municipal People =

- Founded: 1954
- Ideology: Syndicalism; Regionalism; Localism
- Political position: Far-left

Libertarian Municipal People (Swedish: Frihetliga Kommunalfolket, FKF) was originally a slate to contest municipal elections in Sweden, first proposed and staffed by libertarian socialists and syndicalists.

In late February 1950, representatives from syndicalist organizations from Gästrikland, northern Uppland, Älvdalen, as well as individuals from Stockholm, Västmanland and Härjedalen gathered to form a platform to contest municipal elections. Thus FKF emerged, formed outside of the SAC proper. The 'National Organization of Libertarian Municipal People' (Frihetliga Kommunalfolkets Riksorganisation) was founded on June 28, 1950. FKF won 51 seats in 16 municipalities in the 1950 municipal elections, becoming the largest party in Älvdalen with 10 seats.

In 1959, FKF won three seats in Ekshärad municipality.

FKF won municipal representation in Ljusdal in 1976.

A text published by SAC in 1963 defined the role of FKF in the following way: "Syndikalismen bildar alltså inget politiskt parti, men utanför SAC har syndikalister bildat Frihetliga Kommunalfolket som har haft relativt stora framgångar, bland annat i vissa områden i Dalarna. Den kommunala självstyrelsen har i syndikalismen en hängiven försvarare, och den frihetliga kommunalrörelsen är ett uttryck för direkt frihetlig aktion underifrån." ("Thus Syndicalism does not form any political party, but outside of SAC syndicalists have formed Frihetliga Kommunalfolket which has had relative big successes, for example in some areas in Dalarna. Syndicalism is a faithful defender of the municipal self-rule, and the libertarian municipal movement is an expression of direct libertarian action from below.")

In the 1994 elections, the candidature FKF was used in two municipalities, Älvdalen and Ljusdal. FKF got 3.6% of votes in Ljusdal and 2.8% in Älvdalen.

In the 1998 elections in Älvdalen, FKF received 286 votes (6.3%) and 3 seats.

Notably, both the Älvdalen and Färila (in Ljusdal municipality) local organizations of the SAC belonged to the pragmatic fraction that broke away in end of 1990s.

In Ljusdal, Libertarian Municipal People fielded a joint candidature with Rädda Ljusdalsbygden (environmentally oriented splinter group of VPK) called Frihetliga Ljusdalsbygden. FLB contested the 2002 municipal elections and got 551 votes (5.0%) and two seats; Artur Berg from FKF and Jonny Mill from RLB. FLB has however broken down after the elections, and both groups work separately again.

FKF in Älvdalen is involved in a regional coalition Folkkampanjen för sjukvården (Peoples Campaign for Health Care).

FKF has a replacement seat in the Associations of Municipalities of Dalarna.
