= Future Party (Sweden) =

Future Party Framtidspartiet
- Abbreviation: Framt
- Founded: 1998
- Dissolved: 2006
- Headquarters: Tingsryd
- Ideology: Regionalism; Localism
- Colors: Green and yellow

Future Party (Swedish: Framtidspartiet, abbreviated Framt) was a local political party in Tingsryd, Sweden. The party was founded before the 1998 municipal elections. The party was dissolved after the 2006 municipal elections. In the 2002 municipal polls, it got 420 votes (5.3%) and three seats. The last party leader was Ulf Nygren.

The party should not be confused with a marginal right-wing fringe party bearing the same name.

== Elections ==
Year	Votes	%	Mandate
1998	350	4.28	2 / 49
2002	420	5.38	3 / 49
2006	215	2.79	1 / 41
