= Swedish Senior Citizen Interest Party =

Swedish Senior Citizen Interest Party SPI Välfärden
- Leader: Göran Dandelo
- Founded: 1987
- Membership: 5,000-6,000 (2006)
- Ideology: Pensioners' interests Single-issue politics
- Riksdag: 0 / 349
- European Parliament: 0 / 21
- County councils: 0 / 1,597
- Municipal councils: 3 / 12,780

Website
- http://www.spi-valfarden.se/

The Swedish Senior Citizen Interest Party (Sveriges pensionärers intresseparti, SPI Välfärden) is a political party in Sweden. As of 2018, it holds no seats in parliament or regional councils, but is represented in Hörby municipal council. The party did not campaign on the national level in the 2018 election. The current party chairman is Göran Dandelo.
