= Stockholm Party =

Stockholm Party Stockholmspartiet
- Chairman: Elisabet Delang
- Founded: 1979
- Headquarters: Stockholm
- Ideology: Regionalism; Localism
- Colours: Purple, Yellow, Black

Website
- www.stockholmspartiet.se

The Stockholm Party (Swedish: Stockholmspartiet) is a Political Party in Sweden, registered for the Municipal and County Council elections. It was founded in 1979 and was represented in the Stockholm city council from 1979-2002. It failed to reach enough votes to return in the elections of 2006.

The Party has a political base of issues concerning the capital Stockholm, such as traffic. It has traditionally often had a role of balancing the power between the two major political blocs in Sweden, but it currently follows a centre-right political agenda.
