= 2014 Södermanland county election =

2014 Swedish local government election

Södermanland County held a county council election on 14 September 2014 across its nine municipalities. This was part of the 2014 Swedish local elections. It was held on the same day as the general and municipal elections.

== Results ==
The number of seats remained at 71. The Social Democrats won the most seats at 23, a drop of four from 2010.

Party	Votes	%	Seats	±
Social Democrats	59,241	33.3	23	-4
Moderates	34,498	19.3	14	-4
Vård för pengarna	20,243	11.4	8	+8
Sweden Democrats	19,150	10.8	8	+4
Green Party	10,401	5.9	4	-2
Left Party	9,992	5.6	4	0
Centre Party	8,266	4.7	4	0
People's Party	8,255	4.7	3	-2
Christian Democrats	6,478	3.6	3	0
Others	1,226	0.7	0	0
Invalid/blank votes	3,382			
Total	181,132	100	71	0
Source: val.se

== Municipal results ==
Vård för pengarna becoming the largest party in Nyköping marked the first time the Social Democrats had not topped a poll in either the city of Nyköping or the post-1970's municipality for more than a century. The nine municipalities were divided into four separate constituencies based on geography, in which Eskilstuna was a unitary constituency.

Location	Turnout	Share	Votes	S	M	VåfP	SD	MP	V	C	FP	KD	Other
Eskilstuna	82.9	34.3	60,993	35.7	20.4	4.2	13.9	6.3	6.6	3.7	4.6	4.0	0.7
Flen	82.2	5.7	10,217	36.3	16.4	6.9	14.1	4.4	6.2	8.1	3.4	3.7	0.6
Gnesta	84.2	3.8	6,825	29.9	21.4	9.6	7.8	8.8	6.8	8.2	3.4	3.0	1.2
Katrineholm	83.4	11.9	21,227	42.2	14.9	6.3	9.5	6.3	4.8	6.2	6.0	3.3	0.6
Nyköping	85.5	20.1	35,725	27.1	15.3	30.5	6.6	5.3	4.1	3.9	4.0	2.5	0.7
Oxelösund	82.6	4.3	7,561	34.3	12.7	27.9	6.9	3.7	8.1	1.8	2.5	1.6	0.7
Strängnäs	84.3	12.1	21,482	28.1	28.6	2.8	10.9	6.1	5.9	4.9	6.5	5.5	0.7
Trosa	86.4	4.4	7,902	26.1	29.6	12.4	7.4	6.2	3.7	4.9	4.9	4.0	0.7
Vingåker	85.9	3.3	5,818	41.4	14.6	6.2	15.1	4.2	4.3	5.8	3.6	4.0	0.6
Total	82.9	100.0	177,750	33.3	19.4	11.4	10.8	5.9	5.6	4.7	4.6	3.6	0.5
Source: val.se
