= 2018 Gävleborg regional election =

Regional council election in Gävleborg County, Sweden

Gävleborg County or Region Gävleborg held a regional council election on 9 September 2018, on the same day as the general and municipal elections.

== Results ==
The number of seats remained at 75 with the Social Democrats winning the most at 24, a drop of two from 2014.

Party	Votes	%	Seats	±
Social Democrats	58,521	31.6	24	-2
Moderates	27,556	14.9	11	-2
Sweden Democrats	27,494	14.9	11	+3
Centre Party	18,146	9.8	8	+2
Left Party	15,809	8.5	7	+1
Health Care Party	13,176	7.1	5	-1
Christian Democrats	9,364	5.1	4	+1
Liberals	8,440	4.6	3	0
Green Party	5,720	3.1	2	-2
Others	805	0.4	0	0
Invalid/blank votes	3,733			
Total	185,031	100	75	0
Source: val.se

== Municipalities ==
Location	Turnout	Share	Votes	S	M	SD	C	V	SJP	KD	L	MP	Other
Bollnäs	83.0	9.3	17,179	32.1	12.5	13.1	13.0	7.3	9.3	5.1	4.7	2.5	0.3
Gävle	85.4	35.9	66,452	30.1	18.1	15.6	5.6	8.8	6.5	4.8	6.0	3.9	0.5
Hofors	81.2	3.3	6,111	36.6	10.2	14.9	6.2	12.7	7.1	4.6	5.4	1.8	0.5
Hudiksvall	82.8	13.1	24,217	31.5	13.9	11.7	15.1	10.0	5.7	5.2	2.6	3.6	0.5
Ljusdal	79.6	6.3	11,676	32.0	16.9	13.5	10.9	6.9	9.0	3.7	3.4	3.4	0.4
Nordanstig	81.3	3.2	5,985	30.9	11.3	17.1	12.2	9.2	7.0	6.5	3.2	2.0	0.5
Ockelbo	83.8	2.1	3,900	34.0	8.9	22.1	11.8	6.3	8.6	3.6	1.8	2.4	0.4
Ovanåker	84.0	4.1	7,592	30.3	9.7	11.9	18.7	4.0	9.0	11.7	2.6	1.6	0.3
Sandviken	84.1	13.6	25,127	35.0	13.9	17.2	6.7	8.6	6.7	4.2	5.2	2.1	0.3
Söderhamn	84.0	9.1	16,792	30.4	12.9	14.6	15.3	8.7	7.6	4.8	2.8	2.5	0.3
Total	83.8	100.0	185,031	31.6	14.9	14.9	9.8	8.5	7.1	5.1	4.6	3.1	0.4
Source: val.se

== Images ==
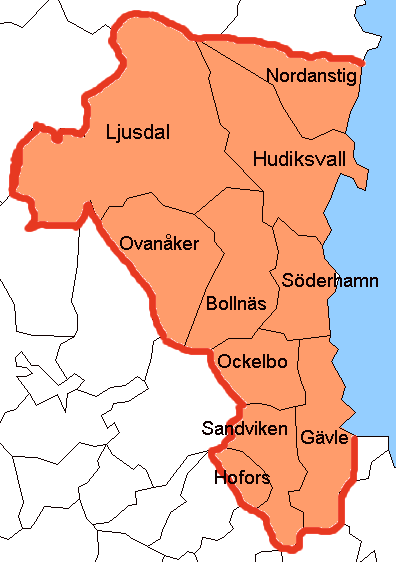
