= 2014 Uppsala county election =

County election in Uppsala, Sweden

Uppsala County held a county council election on 14 September 2014, on the same day as the general and municipal elections.

== Results ==
The number of seats remained at 71 with the Social Democrats winning the most at 24, a gain of two from 2010.

| Party | Votes | % | Seats | ± |
|---|---|---|---|---|
| Social Democrats | 74,420 | 32.7 | 24 | +2 |
| Moderates | 44,151 | 19.4 | 14 | -6 |
| Green Party | 20,041 | 8.8 | 7 | +1 |
| Left Party | 18,291 | 8.0 | 6 | +2 |
| Sweden Democrats | 18,284 | 8.0 | 6 | +3 |
| People's Party | 16,010 | 7.0 | 5 | -1 |
| Centre Party | 15,929 | 7.0 | 5 | -1 |
| Christian Democrats | 12,220 | 5.4 | 4 | 0 |
| Others | 8,177 | 3.6 | 0 | 0 |
| Invalid/blank votes | 3,701 | | | |
| Total | 231,224 | 100 | 71 | 0 |
Source: val.se

== Municipalities ==
| Location | Turnout | Share | Votes | S | M | MP | V | SD | FP | C | KD | Other |
|---|---|---|---|---|---|---|---|---|---|---|---|---|
| Enköping | 83.6 | 11.6 | 26,452 | 34.1 | 24.2 | 5.8 | 4.6 | 9.6 | 5.0 | 10.4 | 4.3 | 1.9 |
| Heby | 82.0 | 3.8 | 8,639 | 38.0 | 12.8 | 3.8 | 5.2 | 13.0 | 3.4 | 16.6 | 5.0 | 2.0 |
| Håbo | 84.6 | 5.5 | 12,575 | 32.0 | 28.9 | 5.8 | 3.8 | 11.3 | 5.4 | 5.5 | 5.3 | 1.9 |
| Knivsta | 86.9 | 4.3 | 9,671 | 27.6 | 26.0 | 7.4 | 5.0 | 7.7 | 7.6 | 7.4 | 9.0 | 2.3 |
| Tierp | 83.2 | 5.8 | 13,236 | 45.7 | 12.5 | 4.5 | 5.7 | 11.5 | 3.1 | 11.4 | 3.1 | 2.4 |
| Uppsala | 85.0 | 60.2 | 136,865 | 29.6 | 18.7 | 11.2 | 10.1 | 6.2 | 8.6 | 5.2 | 5.9 | 4.5 |
| Älvkarleby | 83.8 | 2.6 | 5,967 | 49.6 | 12.6 | 4.1 | 7.3 | 15.9 | 3.2 | 3.3 | 2.3 | 1.7 |
| Östhammar | 83.2 | 6.2 | 14,118 | 41.5 | 17.3 | 4.1 | 4.8 | 10.4 | 4.3 | 10.9 | 3.7 | 3.1 |
| Total | 84.5 | 100.0 | 227,523 | 32.7 | 19.4 | 8.8 | 8.0 | 8.0 | 7.0 | 7.0 | 5.4 | 3.6 |
Source: val.se

== Images ==
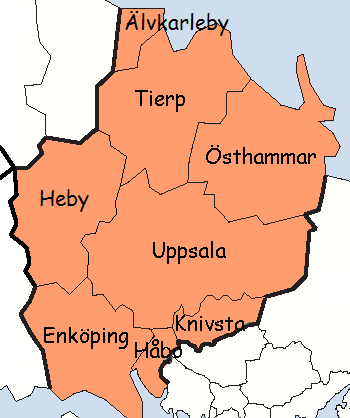
