= 2018 Uppsala regional election =

Uppsala County or Region Uppsala held a regional council election on 9 September 2018, on the same day as the general and municipal elections.

== Results ==
The number of seats remained at 71 with the Social Democrats winning the most at 20, a drop of four from 2014.

Party	Votes	%	Seats	±
Social Democrats	65,873	27.1	20	-4
Moderates	43,616	18.0	13	-1
Sweden Democrats	28,782	11.9	9	+3
Left Party	24,774	10.2	7	+1
Centre Party	22,577	9.3	7	+2
Christian Democrats	21,109	8.7	6	+2
Liberals	18,158	7.5	5	0
Green Party	12,253	5.0	4	-3
Others	5,493	2.3	0	0
Invalid/blank votes	3,695			
Total	242,635	100	71	0
Source: val.se

== Municipalities ==
Location	Turnout	Share	Votes	S	M	SD	V	C	KD	L	MP	Other
Enköping	85.0	11.7	28,455	27.5	22.3	15.5	5.4	11.7	7.9	4.9	3.3	1.7
Heby	83.6	3.7	8,993	29.5	11.7	18.4	6.4	17.9	8.7	3.3	2.2	1.9
Håbo	85.3	5.5	13,291	24.4	26.6	19.3	5.4	7.0	8.2	5.6	2.7	0.8
Knivsta	88.1	4.7	11,292	22.1	19.9	12.4	6.6	10.0	14.1	8.9	4.7	1.3
Tierp	84.9	5.7	13,774	32.6	13.8	16.2	7.7	15.3	5.9	3.5	2.8	2.2
Uppsala	86.3	60.3	146,204	25.9	17.3	8.9	12.9	7.9	8.8	9.1	6.4	2.7
Älvkarleby	84.9	2.5	6,030	42.2	12.6	20.6	7.3	5.1	5.5	3.4	2.3	1.0
Östhammar	84.9	6.0	14,596	32.1	16.7	16.1	5.5	10.8	9.9	4.6	2.3	2.0
Total	85.8	100.0	242,635	27.1	18.0	11.9	10.2	9.3	8.7	7.5	5.0	2.2
Source: val.se

== Images ==
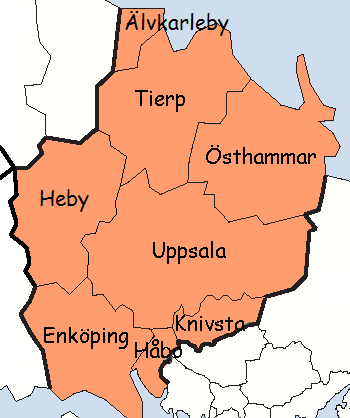
