= 2014 Gävleborg county election =

Regional council election in Gävleborg County, Sweden

Gävleborg County held a county council election on 14 September 2014, on the same day as the general and municipal elections.

== Results ==
The number of seats remained at 75 with the Social Democrats winning the most at 26, a drop of two from 2010. The party gained 34.3% of an overall valid vote of 181,001.

Party	Votes	%	Seats	±
Social Democrats	62,025	34.3	24	-2
Moderates	30,501	16.9	13	-2
Sweden Democrats	20,437	11.3	8	+4
Left Party	14,893	8.2	6	0
Health Care Party	13,176	7.9	6	+2
Centre Party	13,698	7.6	6	0
Green Party	9,488	5.2	4	0
People's Party	7,951	4.4	3	-2
Christian Democrats	7,021	3.9	3	0
Others	660	0.4	0	0
Invalid/blank votes	3,337			
Total	184,338	100	75	0
Source: val.se

== Municipalities ==
Location	Turnout	Share	Votes	S	M	SD	V	SJP	C	MP	FP	KD	Other
Bollnäs	82.1	9.3	16,840	33.8	11.8	12.3	6.9	10.7	12.0	4.0	4.5	3.7	0.3
Gävle	84.3	35.4	64,004	29.6	23.3	11.7	8.5	6.3	4.1	6.6	6.1	3.4	0.4
Hofors	80.1	3.3	6,005	42.6	10.1	9.9	13.1	8.6	4.5	3.3	3.7	3.8	0.3
Hudiksvall	82.0	13.1	23,789	35.4	14.0	9.2	9.5	6.9	10.2	6.2	2.7	5.4	0.5
Ljusdal	79.2	6.5	11,716	32.3	17.4	11.6	7.2	9.9	9.5	5.4	3.8	2.5	0.4
Nordanstig	81.6	3.4	6,072	36.2	11.3	13.0	6.9	8.9	10.7	3.7	4.2	4.9	0.2
Ockelbo	83.4	2.1	3,830	40.2	10.5	15.1	6.6	5.6	12.5	3.9	2.8	2.4	0.3
Ovanåker	83.3	4.1	7,481	31.5	9.4	9.6	4.1	11.3	17.3	3.0	2.7	10.7	0.3
Sandviken	83.3	13.5	24,497	41.1	15.6	10.9	8.6	7.5	5.2	4.0	3.9	2.9	0.4
Söderhamn	82.7	9.3	16,767	38.7	12.0	12.0	7.7	10.3	9.0	4.3	2.9	3.1	0.2
Total	82.9	100.0	181,001	34.3	16.9	11.3	8.2	7.9	7.6	5.2	4.4	3.9	0.4
Source: val.se

== Images ==
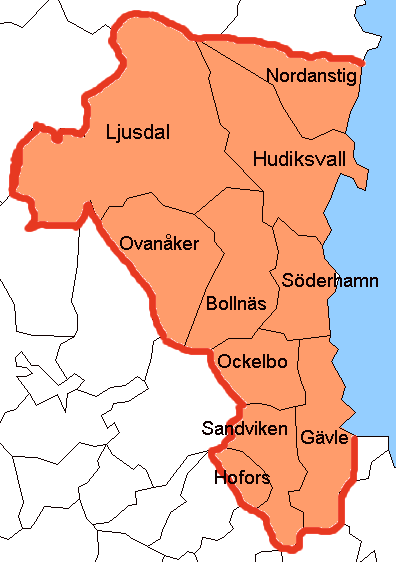
