= 2014 Norrbotten county election =

Regional council election in Norrbotten County, Sweden

Norrbotten County held a county council election on 14 September 2014, on the same day as the general and municipal elections.

== Results ==
The number of seats remained at 71 with the Social Democrats winning the most at 27, a loss of six seats from 2010. The Social Democrats received 36.9% of the votes with the Health Care Party coming second at 25.3%, making sizeable inroads to the historically dominant party in the county and were the largest party in four municipalities. There were 165,017 valid ballots cast for a turnout of 82.8%.

Party	Votes	%	Seats	±
Social Democrats	60,841	36.9	27	–6
Health Care Party	41,702	25.3	19	+6
Moderates	14,473	8.8	6	-3
Left Party	12,306	7.5	6	0
Centre Party	8,940	5.4	4	0
Sweden Democrats	7,741	4.7	3	+3
Green Party	7,216	4.4	3	0
People's Party	5,689	3.4	3	0
Christian Democrats	3,910	2.4	0	0
Others	2,199	1.3	0	0
Invalid/blank votes	2,323			
Total	167,340	100	71	0
Source:val.se

=== Municipalities ===
Location	Turnout	Share	Votes	S	SJV	M	V	C	SD	MP	FP	KD	Other
Arjeplog	77.4	1.1	1,836	30.4	36.3	2.8	9.5	7.6	4.7	1.9	4.1	2.3	0.2
Arvidsjaur	82.0	2.6	4,239	38.0	29.1	5.1	7.9	9.4	4.8	1.3	3.2	0.6	0.6
Boden	85.0	11.4	18,739	35.5	25.8	12.0	6.0	2.8	7.1	4.0	3.8	2.3	0.6
Gällivare	79.9	7.2	11,834	38.2	24.7	9.3	13.1	1.2	5.7	4.2	1.3	1.5	0.8
Haparanda	60.0	2.9	4,735	34.0	31.2	8.4	4.4	4.9	11.8	2.0	0.9	1.9	0.4
Jokkmokk	78.6	2.0	3,242	41.1	24.6	4.1	7.0	1.1	5.0	11.4	3.8	1.0	0.8
Kalix	83.0	6.7	10,989	29.6	41.0	7.1	3.8	8.0	3.8	3.3	2.2	1.0	0.2
Kiruna	82.2	9.1	15,005	13.7	59.1	3.0	6.1	9.1	2.1	2.1	1.3	1.6	1.8
Luleå	85.2	31.0	51,173	43.0	12.0	12.0	6.8	4.6	4.7	6.3	5.2	2.8	2.6
Pajala	77.9	2.4	4,020	34.2	26.5	5.5	16.8	2.4	4.0	1.7	1.7	6.6	0.5
Piteå	86.7	17.3	28,622	40.9	22.3	8.2	7.8	5.5	3.9	4.6	3.1	2.9	0.8
Älvsbyn	82.6	3.2	5,346	44.3	20.8	2.8	8.6	7.9	6.1	1.4	5.0	2.6	0.4
Överkalix	83.1	1.4	2,367	39.3	27.9	4.5	10.6	9.0	4.4	1.3	1.8	0.6	0.7
Övertorneå	74.9	1.7	2,870	29.5	35.3	4.0	8.3	10.9	4.4	2.4	1.7	3.2	0.3
Total	82.8	100.0	165,017	36.9	25.3	8.8	7.5	5.4	4.7	4.4	3.4	2.4	1.3
Source: val.se

== Images ==
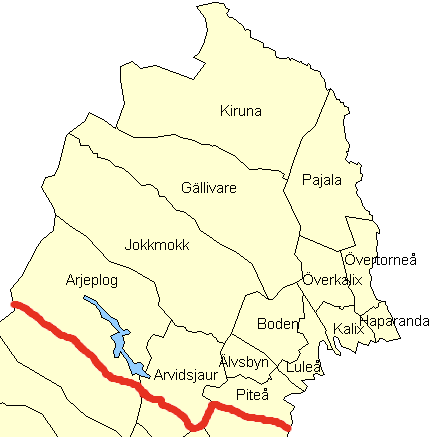
