= 2018 Norrbotten regional election =

Regional council election in Norrbotten County, Sweden

Norrbotten County or Region Norrbotten held a regional council election on 9 September 2018, on the same day as the general and municipal elections.

== Results ==
The number of seats remained at 71 with the Health Care Party winning the most seats at 27, overtaking the Social Democrats at 23, after having trailed the Social Democrats by eight seats in 2014. The Health Care Party became the first party to supplant the Social Democrats as the largest party in any election in Norrbotten in the post world-war era. The party received 34.7% compared to 29.6% for the Social Democrats.

Party	Votes	%	Seats	±
Health Care Party	57,835	34.7	27	+8
Social Democrats	49,423	29.6	23	–4
Moderates	13,771	8.3	6	0
Left Party	13,073	7.8	6	0
Sweden Democrats	9,935	6.0	5	+2
Centre Party	8,545	5.1	4	0
Liberals	4,947	3.0	0	0
Christian Democrats	4,098	2.5	0	0
Green Party	3,730	2.2	0	–3
Others	1,361	0.8	0	0
Invalid/blank votes	2,159			
Total	166,718	100	71	0
Source:val.se

=== Municipalities ===
Location	Turnout	Share	Votes	SJV	S	M	V	SD	C	L	KD	MP	Other
Arjeplog	80.8	1.1	1,823	48.9	22.4	2.8	8.4	4.7	5.4	2.2	3.1	1.9	0.2
Arvidsjaur	82.1	2.5	4,115	40.7	30.3	3.5	7.9	4.5	8.7	1.2	2.5	0.6	0.2
Boden	85.7	11.4	19,067	35.4	30.9	9.0	5.9	7.3	3.5	2.4	3.0	1.9	0.7
Gällivare	79.6	6.8	11,313	32.1	31.1	9.6	9.8	10.1	1.4	1.5	1.2	2.7	0.6
Haparanda	63.3	2.9	4,880	48.8	24.1	5.8	3.5	6.2	7.7	2.2	0.5	1.0	0.2
Jokkmokk	80.4	1.9	3,244	35.8	32.0	4.7	7.9	6.0	2.2	1.2	2.0	7.5	0.8
Kalix	85.0	6.6	11,072	47.3	24.3	8.5	4.4	5.5	5.3	1.8	0.8	1.9	0.3
Kiruna	83.1	9.0	14,951	69.6	11.3	2.6	5.1	3.1	4.1	1.3	1.0	1.1	0.9
Luleå	86.7	31.7	52,867	22.4	32.6	11.5	9.2	5.9	5.6	3.0	5.1	3.2	1.5
Pajala	78.6	2.3	3,827	38.9	23.6	5.3	15.9	4.9	2.6	6.5	1.1	1.0	0.4
Piteå	88.0	17.5	29,251	29.9	34.8	8.1	8.5	5.3	6.1	2.9	2.2	1.9	0.4
Älvsbyn	82.5	3.2	5,307	30.4	35.1	3.2	7.7	7.9	7.2	3.5	4.1	0.7	0.2
Överkalix	82.6	1.4	2,257	38.1	36.9	4.3	6.1	4.9	6.6	0.8	1.2	0.8	0.3
Övertorneå	75.3	1.6	2,744	42.6	27.6	2.8	6.3	5.9	9.4	3.5	0.8	0.7	0.3
Total	84.1	100.0	166,718	34.7	29.6	8.3	7.8	6.0	5.1	3.0	2.5	2.2	0.8
Source: val.se

== Images ==
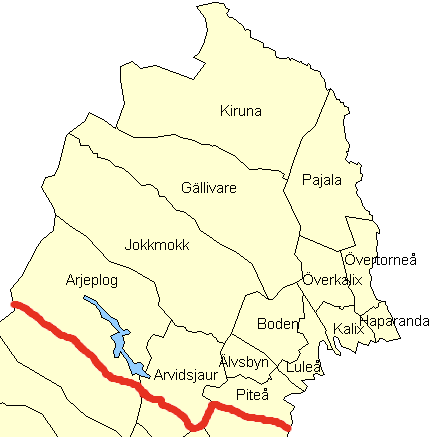
