= 2018 Västernorrland regional election =

Regional council election in Västernorrland County, Sweden

Västernorrland County or Region Västernorrland held regional council elections on 9 September 2018 on the same day as the general and municipal elections.

== Results ==
The number of seats remained at 77 with the Social Democrats winning the most at 28, a drop of ten from in 2014. The party especially lost a lot of ground in Sollefteå following the closure of the childbirth unit of the local hospital, going from 47.6% to 14%.

Party	Votes	%	Seats	±
Social Democrats	57,355	35.4	28	–10
Moderates	20,415	12.6	10	–1
Left Party	17,213	10.6	8	+2
Sweden Democrats	16,921	10.5	8	+2
Centre Party	15,677	9.7	8	+2
Health Care Party	14,098	8.7	7	+7
Christian Democrats	9,413	5.8	5	+2
Liberals	6,015	3.7	3	–1
Green Party	3,784	2.3	0	–3
Others	934	0.9	0	0
Invalid/blank votes	2,679			
Total	161,825	100	77	0
Source:val.se

== Municipal results ==
=== Percentage ===
Location	Turnout	Share	Votes	S	M	V	SD	C	SJVP	KD	L	MP	Other
Härnösand	85.1	10.1	16,376	30.4	13.1	12.5	11.1	10.1	9.4	4.9	3.4	4.4	0.8
Kramfors	83.4	7.5	12,188	27.7	7.0	18.1	10.4	13.3	16.1	3.2	1.6	1.5	1.1
Sollefteå	83.7	7.9	12,799	14.0	5.0	26.3	6.9	10.8	32.6	2.2	0.9	0.9	0.3
Sundsvall	85.4	40.3	65,197	38.9	16.7	7.7	11.7	7.3	2.6	5.9	5.7	2.9	0.7
Timrå	84.9	7.3	11,880	43.9	10.8	8.6	14.3	6.4	4.8	5.5	3.6	1.7	0.4
Ånge	82.3	3.8	6,141	43.8	11.2	6.3	15.6	7.3	4.2	8.6	1.6	0.9	0.4
Örnsköldsvik	86.3	23.0	37,244	37.4	10.5	8.5	7.2	13.6	10.5	7.8	2.5	1.7	0.3
Total	85.1	100.0	161,825	35.4	12.6	10.6	10.4	9.7	8.7	5.8	3.7	2.3	0.6
Source: val.se

=== Votes ===
Location	Turnout	Share	Votes	S	M	V	SD	C	SJVP	KD	L	MP	Other
Härnösand	85.1	10.1	16,376	4,973	2,143	2,054	1,811	1,646	1,539	800	563	724	123
Kramfors	83.4	7.5	12,188	3,374	853	2,210	1,263	1,616	1,967	390	192	184	139
Sollefteå	83.7	7.9	12,799	1,786	646	3,370	886	1,380	4,173	279	117	118	44
Sundsvall	85.4	40.3	65,197	25,383	10,898	5,013	7,627	4,744	1,703	3,838	3,692	1,865	434
Timrå	84.9	7.3	11,880	5,217	1,286	1,016	1,701	760	565	655	432	202	46
Ånge	82.3	3.8	6,141	2,692	687	387	960	451	259	531	97	54	23
Örnsköldsvik	86.3	23.0	37,244	13,930	3,902	3,163	2,673	5,080	3,892	2,920	922	637	125
Total	85.1	100.0	161,825	57,355	20,415	17,213	16,921	15,677	14,098	9,413	6,015	3,784	934
Source: val.se

== Images ==
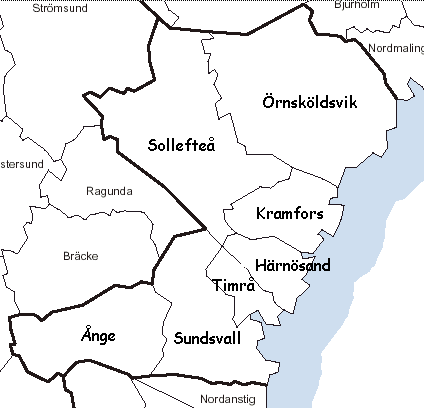
