= 2014 Örebro county election =

Regional council election in Örebro County, Sweden

Örebro County held a county council election on 14 September 2014, on the same day as the general and municipal elections.

== Results ==
The number of seats remained at 71 with the Social Democrats winning the most at 29, a drop of two from in 2010. The party won 40.7% of a vote total of 186,588.

Party	Votes	%	Seats	±
Social Democrats	75,873	40.7	29	-2
Moderates	33,122	17.8	13	-2
Sweden Democrats	18,884	10.1	8	+4
Left Party	11,924	6.4	5	+1
Green Party	7,041	6.1	4	0
Christian Democrats	10,960	5.9	4	0
Centre Party	10,501	5.6	4	0
People's Party	9,656	5.2	4	-1
Others	4,223	2.3	0	0
Invalid/blank votes	3,328			
Total	189,926	100	71	0
Source:val.se

=== Municipalities ===
Location	Turnout	Share	Votes	S	M	SD	V	MP	KD	C	FP	Other
Askersund	84.8	4.0	7,489	40.4	17.8	13.2	5.8	4.3	5.0	8.4	3.9	1.1
Degerfors	83.2	3.4	6,321	51.9	9.0	8.1	15.4	3.9	4.2	3.8	2.1	1.6
Hallsberg	85.6	5.5	10,220	47.0	13.4	13.1	5.7	4.4	4.9	6.5	3.8	1.3
Hällefors	78.5	2.3	4,344	48.2	13.5	12.0	9.9	6.9	2.1	3.1	2.7	1.5
Karlskoga	83.1	10.5	19,509	46.0	21.6	8.6	6.0	4.9	3.5	3.0	3.8	2.6
Kumla	84.8	7.1	13,303	41.7	16.9	10.8	5.1	5.1	6.4	5.7	7.0	1.4
Laxå	83.0	2.0	3,664	43.8	12.1	11.6	7.6	3.7	10.4	6.0	3.7	1.1
Lekeberg	86.3	2.6	4,820	33.8	15.9	12.4	5.0	4.4	7.7	15.6	3.6	1.6
Lindesberg	84.0	8.2	15,221	42.0	15.2	16.1	4.6	4.4	4.3	9.0	3.2	1.3
Ljusnarsberg	79.8	1.7	3,097	44.0	11.7	20.6	7.2	4.1	2.5	5.7	3.1	1.1
Nora	83.1	3.6	6,788	47.3	16.2	9.6	6.0	4.3	4.2	7.0	3.6	1.8
Örebro	84.6	49.2	91,812	37.0	19.4	8.3	6.3	7.9	7.0	4.7	6.5	2.9
Total	84.1	100.0	186,588	40.7	17.8	10.1	6.4	6.1	5.9	5.6	5.2	2.3
Source: val.se

== Images ==
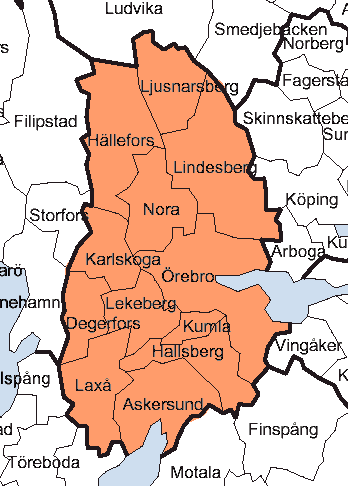
