= 2018 Värmland regional election =

Värmland County or Region Värmland held a regional council election on 9 September 2018, on the same day as the general and municipal elections.

== Results ==
The number of seats remained at 81 with the Social Democrats winning the most at 28, a drop of three from 2014.

Party	Votes	%	Seats	±
Social Democrats	63,308	34.6	28	-3
Moderates	26,214	14.3	12	-2
Sweden Democrats	22,369	12.2	10	+3
Centre Party	17,478	9.6	8	+1
Health Care Party Värmland	14,347	7.8	6	+1
Left Party	12,550	6.9	6	+1
Christian Democrats	11,645	6.4	5	+1
Liberals	8,345	4.6	4	0
Green Party	5,561	3.0	2	-2
Others	1,081	0.6	0	0
Invalid/blank votes	5,225			
Total	186,913	100	101	0
Source: val.se

== Municipalities ==
Location	Turnout	Share	Votes	S	M	SD	C	SV	V	KD	L	MP	Other
Arvika	82.3	9.2	16,764	36.8	14.5	12.3	10.0	5.7	8.0	4.7	3.4	3.3	1.3
Eda	69.7	2.5	4,540	35.6	12.6	14.6	12.2	8.5	5.4	6.5	3.3	1.0	0.5
Filipstad	80.1	3.5	6,463	44.1	13.7	17.1	4.8	5.7	6.9	3.6	2.3	1.4	0.4
Forshaga	86.7	4.1	7,516	41.0	11.7	14.4	8.2	6.7	6.4	6.8	2.6	1.8	0.4
Grums	82.5	3.2	5,831	44.8	11.3	15.6	7.0	6.7	4.9	5.1	2.1	2.1	0.3
Hagfors	79.8	4.2	7,598	48.8	6.4	11.8	9.9	6.5	8.0	4.1	2.7	1.3	0.4
Hammarö	89.1	5.9	10,714	37.2	18.8	8.7	6.1	5.7	5.8	7.6	6.5	3.3	0.4
Karlstad	87.0	34.3	62,653	32.5	17.1	9.9	7.3	6.9	8.4	7.4	5.3	4.4	0.7
Kil	86.8	4.3	7,884	33.8	13.9	14.9	10.8	7.0	5.6	6.0	4.4	3.5	0.2
Kristinehamn	84.4	8.8	16,064	29.2	13.3	12.9	13.3	9.2	7.5	4.7	6.9	2.5	0.4
Munkfors	80.4	1.3	2,373	57.7	7.3	9.8	7.6	3.9	4.8	3.1	3.4	1.1	1.3
Storfors	83.1	1.4	2,630	42.2	9.6	13.3	9.6	8.4	7.2	5.5	2.7	1.1	0.5
Sunne	84.6	4.8	8,707	28.8	13.5	13.1	18.3	7.2	4.5	6.1	5.3	2.7	0.4
Säffle	82.4	5.4	9,909	22.5	11.8	17.2	13.6	23.8	2.9	4.0	2.1	1.7	0.3
Torsby	79.8	4.1	7,559	36.5	13.0	14.3	12.6	7.5	6.4	4.5	3.1	1.6	0.5
Årjäng	74.8	3.1	5,693	27.7	10.1	13.9	11.0	6.9	3.0	18.0	7.2	1.8	0.4
Total	83.9	100.0	182,898	34.6	14.3	12.2	9.6	7.8	6.9	6.4	4.6	3.0	0.6
Source: val.se
