= 2018 Örebro regional election =

Regional council election in Örebro County, Sweden

Örebro County or Region Örebro held a regional council election on 9 September 2018, on the same day as the general and municipal elections.

== Results ==
The number of seats remained at 71 with the Social Democrats winning the most at 25, a drop of four from in 2014. The party declined from 40.7% to 34.5% of the popular vote.

Party	Votes	%	Seats	±
Social Democrats	67,222	34.5	25	−4
Moderates	35,481	18.2	13	0
Sweden Democrats	24,441	12.5	9	+1
Left Party	16,188	8.3	6	+1
Christian Democrats	14,920	7.7	6	+2
Centre Party	14,790	7.6	5	+1
Liberals	10,675	5.5	4	0
Green Party	7,041	3.6	3	−1
Others	4,154	2.1	0	0
Invalid/blank votes	3,359			
Total	194,911	100	71	0
Source:val.se

=== Municipalities ===
Location	Turnout	Share	Votes	S	M	SD	V	KD	C	L	MP	Other
Askersund	86.6	4.0	7,780	34.1	19.2	16.4	6.0	7.8	8.7	3.7	2.3	2.0
Degerfors	84.0	3.3	6,338	40.3	13.1	13.5	18.9	5.0	3.9	2.4	2.4	0.6
Hallsberg	85.7	5.3	10,309	40.2	14.5	16.8	6.7	6.3	8.3	3.5	2.5	1.2
Hällefors	80.2	2.2	4,281	39.0	14.4	15.3	13.9	4.0	8.9	1.7	1.5	1.3
Karlskoga	84.1	10.2	19,863	35.5	28.6	10.8	8.4	5.1	4.4	3.7	3.0	0.6
Kumla	86.5	7.1	13,881	35.4	17.0	14.9	5.6	8.9	7.3	7.0	2.8	1.1
Laxå	82.4	1.8	3,568	35.9	11.9	14.1	7.9	16.1	6.9	3.1	2.5	1.6
Lekeberg	88.3	2.6	5,146	27.2	15.8	17.3	5.0	9.2	17.2	3.8	2.8	1.8
Lindesberg	84.4	7.8	15,281	33.1	17.6	19.2	6.3	6.3	10.0	3.0	2.4	2.1
Ljusnarsberg	78.5	1.5	3,018	36.8	12.0	25.7	7.4	4.4	6.4	3.1	2.4	1.9
Nora	84.0	3.5	6,882	37.9	16.2	13.4	6.6	6.7	8.8	4.2	2.8	3.3
Örebro	85.5	50.6	98,564	33.3	17.9	9.8	8.7	8.6	7.2	7.1	4.6	2.8
Total	85.0	100.0	194,911	34.5	18.2	12.5	8.3	7.7	7.6	5.5	3.6	2.1
Source: val.se

== Images ==
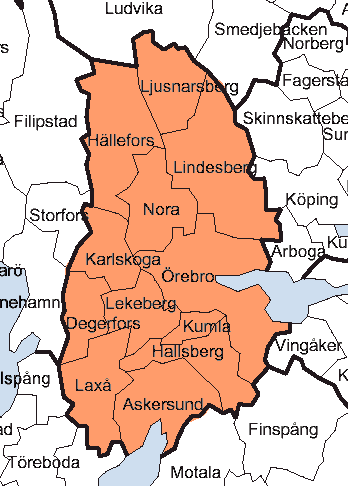
