= 2018 Södermanland regional election =

2018 Swedish local government election

Södermanland County or Region Sörmland held a regional council election on 9 September 2018 across its nine municipalities. This was part of the 2018 Swedish regional elections and held on the same day as the municipal and general elections.

== Results ==
The number of seats rose from 71 to 79. This meant that both the Social Democrats and the Moderates kept their seat numbers in spite of their vote and seat share falling sizeably. The Social Democrats fell the most, going from 33.3% to 28.7%. The local party Vård för pengarna ended up becoming the largest party in both coastal municipalities of Nyköping and Oxelösund. This was the first time any other party than the Social Democrats had topped the poll in Oxelösund in any election since the location's founding. Even so, commanding vote leads in the interior and in the largest town Eskilstuna led to the Social Democrats being the largest party. The Sweden Democrats gained 13.1% of the popular vote in a large numerical rise, rendering four parties gaining about 4/5 of the seats as the Green Party lost all their four seats.

Party	Votes	%	Seats	±
Social Democrats	53,130	28.7	23	0
Vård för pengarna	33,831	18.3	15	+7
Moderates	30,666	16.6	14	0
Sweden Democrats	24,175	13.1	11	+3
Left Party	11,113	6.0	5	+1
Centre Party	9,905	5.4	4	0
Christian Democrats	8,603	4.7	4	+1
Liberals	7,083	3.8	3	0
Green Party	5,302	2.9	0	−4
Others	1,151	0.6	0	0
Invalid/blank votes	2,817			
Total	184,959	100	79	+8
Source: val.se

== Municipal results ==
=== Percentages ===
Location	Turnout	Share	Votes	S	VåfP	M	SD	V	C	KD	L	MP	Other
Eskilstuna	80.8	34.3	63,500	31.5	12.3	16.6	16.1	6.9	4.5	4.5	4.2	2.6	0.8
Flen	81.9	5.6	10,311	30.8	15.8	13.5	15.4	6.4	7.4	4.8	2.9	2.5	0.5
Gnesta	85.6	3.9	7,202	23.6	15.0	18.3	12.3	7.6	9.6	3.8	3.0	5.6	1.3
Katrineholm	84.3	11.8	21,784	37.6	13.6	13.1	11.1	5.3	6.5	4.9	5.0	2.5	0.5
Nyköping	86.3	20.0	37,054	23.9	35.3	13.2	8.6	4.6	4.6	3.5	3.0	2.9	0.5
Oxelösund	83.7	4.2	7,777	30.2	34.3	11.2	9.2	7.0	2.0	2.2	1.7	1.7	0.5
Strängnäs	84.3	12.2	22,578	22.1	10.5	24.4	14.3	6.0	6.5	7.5	4.7	3.4	0.6
Trosa	86.8	4.8	8,821	21.1	16.7	27.7	10.7	4.8	5.9	5.4	4.1	3.2	0.5
Vingåker	85.7	3.2	5,932	33.7	12.6	13.9	17.1	6.3	6.0	5.3	2.6	2.2	0.3
Total	83.5	100.0	184,959	28.7	18.3	16.6	13.1	6.0	5.4	4.7	3.8	2.9	0.6
Source: val.se

=== By votes ===
Location	Turnout	Share	Votes	S	VåfP	M	SD	V	C	KD	L	MP	Other
Eskilstuna	80.8	34.3	63,500	20,030	7,828	10,545	10,223	4,367	2,849	2,841	2,660	1,679	478
Flen	81.9	5.6	10,311	3,178	1,627	1,390	1,585	660	760	493	304	258	56
Gnesta	85.6	3.9	7,202	1,700	1,079	1,316	885	547	691	273	213	403	95
Katrineholm	84.3	11.8	21,784	8,185	2,969	2,861	2,411	1,144	1,409	1,065	1,083	552	105
Nyköping	86.3	20.0	37,054	8,851	13,075	4,904	3,172	1,692	1,695	1,280	1,107	1,093	185
Oxelösund	83.7	4.2	7,777	2,345	2,671	872	714	547	154	169	132	136	37
Strängnäs	84.3	12.2	22,578	4,983	2,360	5,507	3,230	1,364	1,474	1,694	1,064	771	131
Trosa	86.8	4.8	8,821	1,860	1,472	2,445	943	421	518	474	364	280	44
Vingåker	85.7	3.2	5,932	1,998	750	826	1,012	371	355	314	156	130	20
Total	83.5	100.0	184,959	53,130	33,831	30,666	24,175	11,113	9,905	8,603	7,083	5,302	1,151
Source: val.se

== Images ==
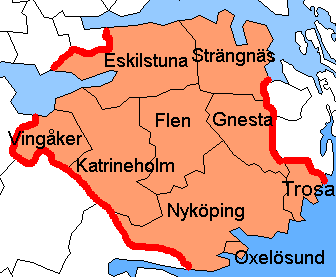
