= 2018 Östergötland regional election =

Östergötland County or Region Östergötland held a regional council election on 9 September 2018, on the same day as the general and municipal elections.

== Results ==
The number of seats remained at 101 with the Social Democrats winning the most at 31, a drop of six from 2014.

Party	Votes	%	Seats	±
Social Democrats	89,863	30.0	31	-6
Moderates	65,827	22.0	23	0
Sweden Democrats	39,174	13.1	13	+3
Left Party	24,142	8.1	8	+2
Centre Party	23,591	7.9	8	+2
Christian Democrats	22,339	7.5	8	+2
Liberals	18,945	6.3	6	0
Green Party	11,747	3.9	4	-3
Others	3,641	1.2	0	0
Invalid/blank votes	5,225			
Total	299,089	100	101	0
Source: val.se

== Municipalities ==
The Moderates received one vote more than the Social Democrats in Söderköping, even though both results were rounded to 22.2%.

Location	Turnout	Share	Votes	S	M	SD	V	C	KD	L	MP	Other
Boxholm	86.2	1.2	3,647	40.0	15.2	15.1	5.5	10.6	6.6	3.6	2.1	1.2
Finspång	85.2	4.8	14,252	37.5	16.3	16.1	8.8	6.6	7.0	4.4	2.4	0.8
Kinda	86.4	2.2	6,556	26.7	17.6	14.7	7.2	11.3	10.2	5.4	3.7	3.2
Linköping	86.3	35.1	105,058	28.6	23.0	10.0	7.7	8.5	7.6	8.1	5.3	1.1
Mjölby	85.8	5.9	17,782	32.1	20.4	15.5	6.9	8.2	6.9	6.6	2.7	0.7
Motala	85.3	9.5	28,438	33.1	22.4	13.8	7.7	6.3	6.6	6.1	2.8	1.1
Norrköping	83.3	29.8	89,262	29.4	23.2	14.8	9.6	5.8	7.0	5.2	3.6	1.3
Söderköping	87.6	3.3	9,732	22.2	22.2	15.1	7.0	12.3	9.3	7.6	3.0	1.4
Vadstena	86.4	1.7	5,178	28.8	25.2	10.7	8.0	9.2	8.6	4.5	4.1	0.8
Valdemarsvik	85.8	1.8	5,293	31.5	18.9	15.4	5.9	13.9	7.3	3.4	1.9	1.8
Ydre	87.9	0.9	2,554	24.7	16.2	12.5	5.8	20.9	12.0	3.1	3.2	1.6
Åtvidaberg	87.4	2.6	7,862	35.3	18.3	16.4	5.6	9.5	6.0	4.9	2.7	1.4
Ödeshög	84.7	1.2	3,475	27.0	15.8	14.4	4.0	13.6	17.9	3.1	3.0	1.2
Total	85.3	100.0	299,089	30.0	22.0	13.1	8.1	7.9	7.5	6.3	3.9	1.3
Source: val.se

== Images ==
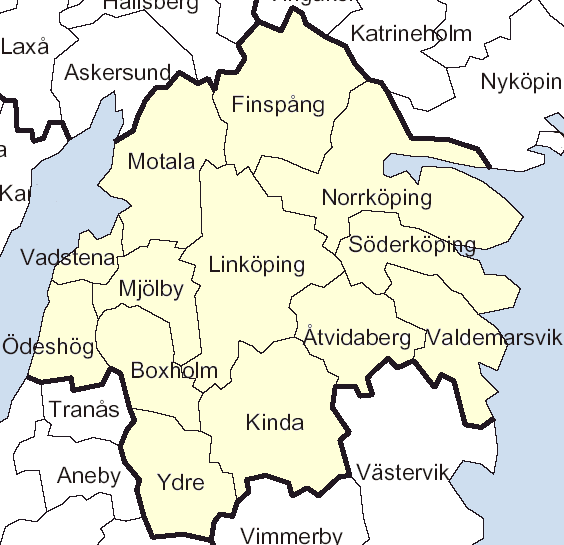
