= 2018 Swedish elections =

2018 Swedish elections may refer to the following elections that occurred in 2018:

- 2018 Swedish general election, to elect the 349 members of the Riksdag
- 2018 Swedish county council elections, to elect the 21 county councils
- 2018 Swedish municipal elections, to elect the 290 municipal councils
