= 2018 Jämtland regional election =

Regional council election in Jämtland County, Sweden

Jämtland County or Region Jämtland held a regional council election on 9 September 2018, on the same day as the general and municipal elections.

== Results ==
The number of seats remained at 55 with the Social Democrats winning the most at 18, a drop of three from 2014.

Party	Votes	%	Seats	±
Social Democrats	26,278	31.4	18	-3
Centre Party	17,088	20.4	11	+3
Moderates	12,602	15.1	8	-3
Sweden Democrats	7,835	9.4	5	+1
Left Party	7,047	8.4	5	+1
Christian Democrats	6,147	7.3	4	+2
Liberals	2,907	3.5	2	0
Green Party	2,894	3.5	2	-1
Others	901	1.1	0	0
Invalid/blank votes	2,022			
Total	83,699	100	55	0
Source: val.se

== Municipalities ==
Location	Turnout	Share	Votes	S	C	M	SD	V	KD	L	MP	Other
Berg	82.0	5.4	4,513	32.0	16.8	23.2	12.1	6.3	5.0	1.8	1.8	1.0
Bräcke	80.8	4.8	4,039	37.0	21.7	13.8	10.8	7.1	4.6	1.8	1.7	1.5
Härjedalen	80.2	7.8	6,517	34.7	19.7	14.5	9.0	6.7	4.4	3.6	1.7	5.5
Krokom	85.6	11.0	9,214	29.8	22.7	14.4	10.0	9.3	8.2	2.4	2.7	0.6
Ragunda	81.7	4.0	3,363	37.5	22.9	7.9	13.5	8.0	5.5	1.5	1.8	1.5
Strömsund	80.6	8.8	7,392	41.7	18.3	11.4	13.2	7.6	4.5	1.6	1.4	0.3
Åre	84.9	8.6	7,194	26.8	28.7	13.8	7.5	6.5	6.6	2.5	6.6	1.0
Östersund	85.4	49.5	41,467	29.1	19.0	16.0	8.1	9.4	8.9	4.7	4.2	0.6
Total	83.9	100.0	83,699	31.4	20.4	15.1	9.4	8.4	7.3	3.5	3.5	1.1
Source: val.se

== Images ==
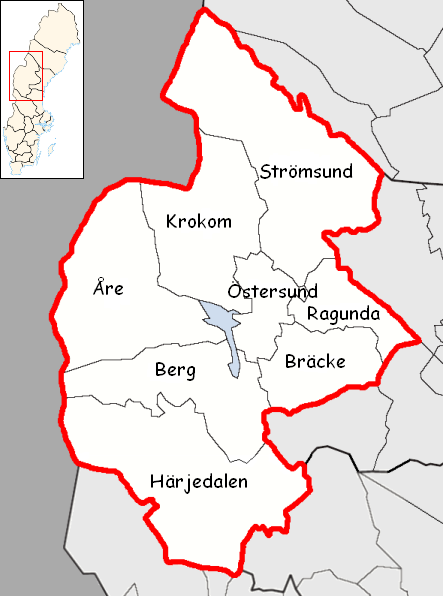
