= Östuna Church =

Coordinates: 59°45′49″N 17°52′45″E

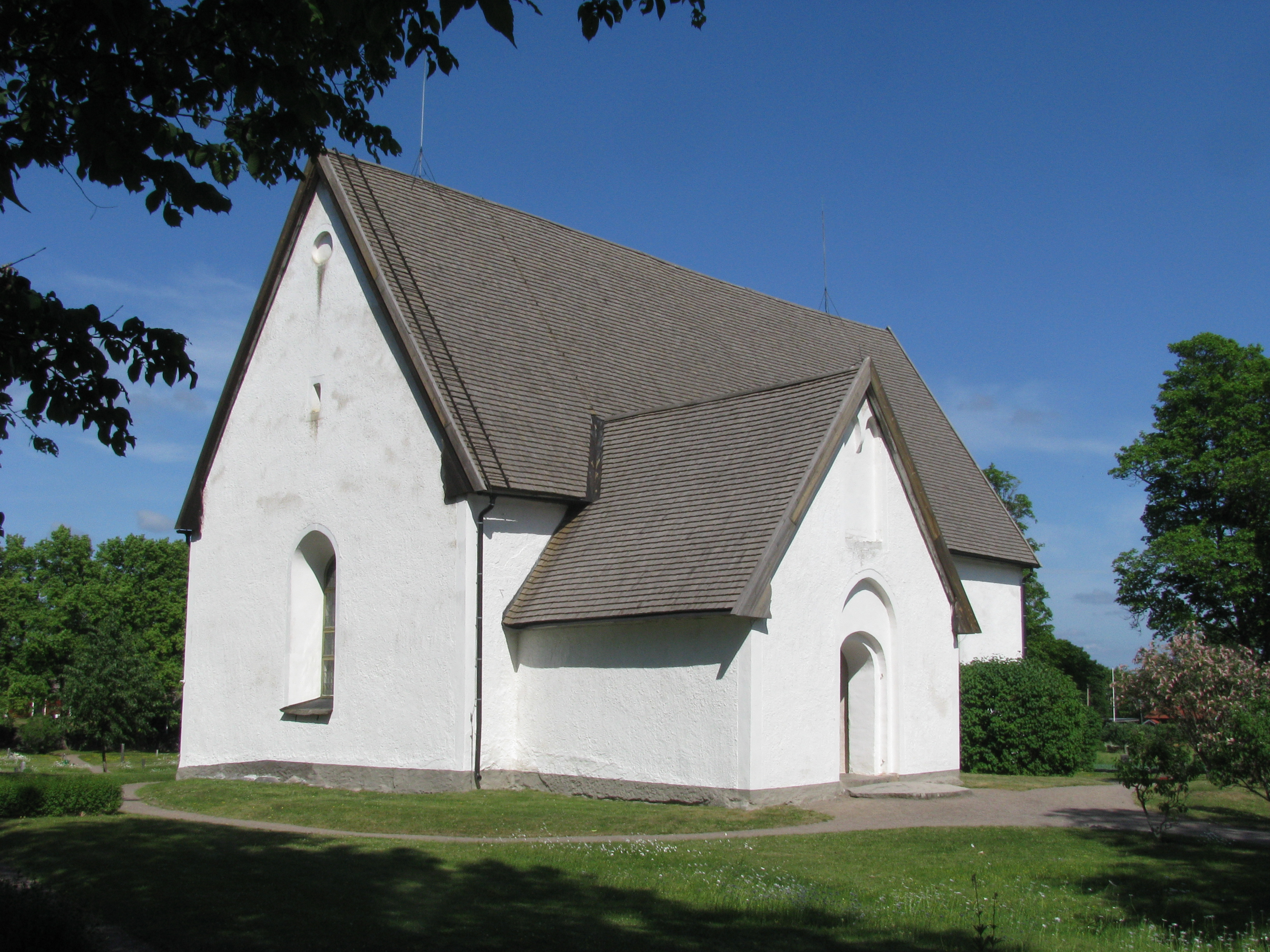
Östuna Church, external view

Östuna Church (Swedish: Östuna kyrka) is a medieval Lutheran church in the Knivsta Municipality in the province of Uppland, Sweden. It belongs to the Archdiocese of Uppsala.

== History and architecture ==
The currently visible church dates from the 15th century, but was without doubt preceded by another church on the same site. When this first church was built is not known, though it must have been at the latest during the early 14th century since several of the present church's fittings date from this time and originate from the older church. The church is a so-called aisleless church, with a southern church porch a northern sacristy. The entrance through the cemetery wall is through a preserved medieval lychgate.

The altarpiece consists of a wooden sculpture of Christ dating from the 15th century, mounted on a plain cross. The altarpiece was created in the 1920s. The church also houses a carved wooden Madonna from the 15th century. The pulpit was made in 1718 by Carl Spaak, who also made two angels adorning the eastern wall of the choir. Among other fittings, a chasuble from the 16th century can be mentioned.
