= 2018 Västerbotten regional election =

Regional council election in Västerbotten County, Sweden

Västerbotten County or Region Västerbotten held a regional council election on 9 September 2018, on the same day as the general and municipal elections.

== Results ==
The number of seats remained at 71 with the Social Democrats winning the most at 26, a drop of four from 2014.

Party	Votes	%	Seats	±
Social Democrats	62,782	35.5	26	-4
Moderates	24,316	13.7	10	+1
Left Party	23,905	13.5	10	+1
Centre Party	20,005	11.3	8	+2
Liberals	14,078	8.0	6	0
Sweden Democrats	11,928	6.7	5	+2
Christian Democrats	10,594	6.0	4	0
Green Party	5,892	3.3	2	-2
Others	3,371	1.9	0	0
Invalid/blank votes	3,402			
Total	176,871	100	71	0
Source: val.se

== Municipalities ==
Location	Turnout	Share	Votes	S	M	V	C	L	SD	KD	MP	Other
Bjurholm	83.1	0.9	1,581	30.6	20.4	4.4	16.8	7.1	11.6	7.5	1.1	0.5
Dorotea	83.1	0.9	1,653	35.3	3.8	9.6	25.8	12.6	6.8	4.3	0.8	0.9
Lycksele	81.9	4.4	7,737	38.3	16.6	8.2	7.0	5.8	7.4	15.1	1.1	0.5
Malå	80.9	1.1	1,900	43.5	7.7	14.7	7.3	11.0	7.9	6.7	0.8	0.4
Nordmaling	82.8	2.6	4,535	33.1	12.2	10.6	18.1	7.6	10.4	6.2	1.1	0.8
Norsjö	80.3	1.4	2,535	43.8	6.5	8.8	11.1	6.8	6.0	15.8	0.8	0.4
Robertsfors	84.1	2.5	4,428	39.3	9.3	9.6	23.4	3.3	6.0	6.1	1.9	1.2
Skellefteå	85.6	27.3	48,223	42.7	12.4	10.0	9.3	9.3	7.9	5.1	2.6	0.8
Sorsele	76.6	0.8	1,469	35.3	10.0	13.9	20.5	3.1	8.6	6.6	1.6	0.3
Storuman	80.7	2.1	3,697	32.2	10.8	12.7	17.5	5.0	10.2	9.3	1.8	0.7
Umeå	86.7	47.5	84,070	31.2	15.8	17.3	9.4	8.5	5.3	4.6	4.7	3.1
Vilhelmina	82.1	2.4	4,270	33.7	5.4	9.8	25.4	1.8	8.2	12.3	1.1	2.3
Vindeln	81.8	1.9	3,412	33.1	14.8	7.5	20.6	3.0	9.7	8.6	1.6	1.1
Vännäs	84.5	3.1	5,549	33.0	11.9	14.0	15.9	4.7	8.3	8.1	3.4	0.8
Åsele	81.1	1.0	1,812	35.0	8.6	8.6	25.7	6.6	9.2	4.7	0.9	0.7
Total	85.2	100.0	176,871	35.5	13.7	13.5	11.3	8.0	6.7	6.0	3.3	1.9
Source: val.se

== Images ==
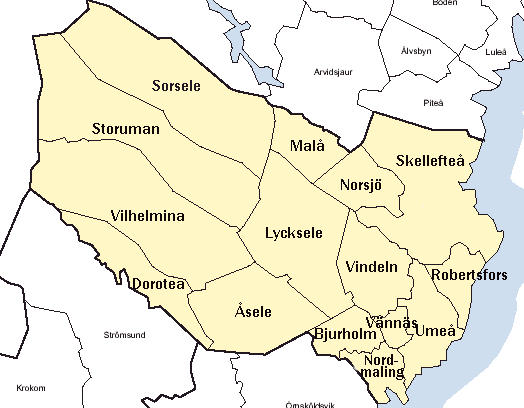
