= 2018 Halland regional election =

Regional council election in Halland County, Sweden

Halland County or Region Halland held a regional council election on 9 September 2018, the same day as the general and municipal elections.

== Results ==
The number of seats remained at 71 with the Social Democrats winning the most at 19, a drop of four from in 2014.

Party	Votes	%	Seats	±
Social Democrats	57,114	26.7	19	–4
Moderates	49,715	23.2	17	–2
Sweden Democrats	30,135	14.1	10	+3
Centre Party	24,788	11.6	8	+1
Christian Democrats	16,216	7.6	6	+3
Liberals	15,317	7.2	5	0
Left Party	11,352	5.3	4	+1
Green Party	6,969	3.3	2	–2
Others	934	1.1	0	0
Invalid/blank votes	3,682			
Total	214,036	100	71	0
Source:val.se

=== Municipal results ===
Location	Turnout	Share	Votes	S	M	SD	C	KD	L	V	MP	Other
Falkenberg	84.6	13.5	28,870	32.0	18.4	12.7	15.4	7.4	5.3	5.4	2.9	0.4
Halmstad	84.8	30.4	65,057	32.2	22.1	13.6	8.8	7.1	5.9	6.2	3.5	0.7
Hylte	80.0	2.9	6,246	35.0	14.0	20.2	14.2	5.4	4.8	4.1	1.8	0.6
Kungsbacka	89.4	25.7	55,000	15.7	31.1	14.2	10.9	8.0	10.2	3.8	3.5	2.5
Laholm	84.0	7.6	16,216	23.7	19.6	20.0	14.4	8.5	5.0	4.0	3.0	1.7
Varberg	87.5	19.9	42,637	28.8	20.7	12.4	12.7	7.7	7.6	6.4	3.1	0.5
Total	86.2	100.0	214,036	26.7	23.2	14.1	11.6	7.6	7.2	5.3	3.3	1.1
Source: val.se

== Images ==
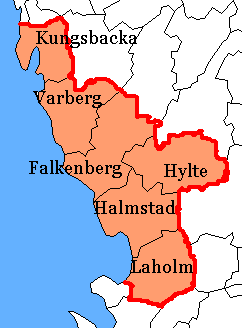
