= 2018 Swedish local elections =

Local elections were held in Sweden on 9 September 2018 to elect the 20 county councils and 290 municipal councils. Advance voting was allowed between 22 August and 9 September 2018. The elections took place alongside the general elections.

Newly registered parties participated in the 2018 elections, such as the Citizens' Coalition. Many smaller and local parties which had already been established participated, such as the Swedish Senior Citizen Interest Party, Feminist Initiative, the Öland Party, the Laholm Party and more.

== Regional councils ==
Sweden held 20 elections for the Regional Councils. This was the first election where all counties' administrative title had been or were officially being shifted into regions.

Party	Votes	%	Seats	+/–
Swedish Social Democratic Party	1,850,724	28.74	523	–80
Moderate Party	1,241,717	19.28	314	–25
Sweden Democrats	828,220	12.86	224	+63
Centre Party	539,075	8.37	155	+30
Left Party	555,043	8.62	141	+20
Christian Democrats	457,679	7.11	119	+34
Liberals	403,781	6.27	94	–2
Green Party	265,522	4.12	48	–58
Others	297,762	4.62	78	+36
Total	6,439,523	100.00	1,696	+18
Valid votes	6,439,523	98.40		
Invalid/blank votes	104,793	1.60		
Total votes	6,544,316	100.00		

=== Elected ===
Region	S	M	SD	C	V	KD	L	MP	Local	Total
Blekinge	19	12	12	5	3	3	3			57
Dalarna	24	16	10	9	6	6	3	3	6	83
Gävleborg	24	11	11	8	7	4	3	2	5	75
Halland	19	17	10	8	4	6	5	2		71
Jämtland	18	8	5	11	5	4	2	2		55
Jönköping	22	13	11	8	4	10	3	3	7	81
Kalmar	25	10	10	8	4	7	3			67
Kronoberg	19	14	8	7	5	5	3			61
Norrbotten	23	6	5	4	6				27	71
Skåne	41	34	30	10	10	8	10	6		149
Stockholm	40	34	15	12	16	12	12	8		149
Södermanland	23	14	11	4	5	4	3		15	79
Uppsala	20	13	9	7	7	6	5	4		71
Värmland	28	12	10	8	6	5	4	2	6	81
Västerbotten	26	10	5	8	10	4	6	2		71
Västernorrland	28	10	8	8	8	5	3		7	77
Västmanland	27	16	12	5	6	5	6			77
Västra Götaland	41	28	20	12	15	11	10	7	5	149
Örebro	25	13	9	5	6	6	4	3		71
Östergötland	31	23	13	8	8	8	6	4		101
Total	523	314	224	155	141	119	94	48	78	1,696
Source: val.se

=== Elections ===
- 2018 Blekinge regional election
- 2018 Dalarna regional election
- 2018 Gävleborg regional election
- 2018 Halland regional election
- 2018 Jämtland regional election
- 2018 Jönköping regional election
- 2018 Kalmar regional election
- 2018 Kronoberg regional election
- 2018 Norrbotten regional election
- 2018 Skåne regional election
- 2018 Stockholm regional election
- 2018 Södermanland regional election
- 2018 Uppsala regional election
- 2018 Värmland regional election
- 2018 Västerbotten regional election
- 2018 Västernorrland regional election
- 2018 Västmanland regional election
- 2018 Västra Götaland regional election
- 2018 Örebro regional election
- 2018 Östergötland regional election

Gotland County is made up of one municipal council responsible for both local and regional matters and does not count towards the regional elections.

== Municipal councils ==
The total number of seats nationwide totalled to 12,700, down from 12,780 in the 2014 elections. Turnout was 84.1%.

Party	Votes	%	Seats	+/–
Swedish Social Democratic Party	1,801,843	27.58	3,752	−612
Moderate Party	1,310,182	20.06	2,396	−39
Sweden Democrats	832,083	12.74	1,806	+482
Centre Party	631,812	9.67	1,603	+192
Left Party	502,147	7.69	808	+58
Liberals	444,674	6.81	689	−21
Christian Democrats	339,375	5.20	676	+161
Green Party	301,825	4.62	395	−337
Feminist Initiative	61,907	0.95	22	−4
Others	306,287	4.69	553	+40
Total	6,532,135	100.00	12,700	−80
Valid votes	6,532,135	98.77		
Invalid/blank votes	81,316	1.23		
Total votes	6,613,451	100.00		
