= Swedish elections, 2014 =

Swedish elections, 2014 can refer to the following elections that occurred in 2014.

- European Parliament election, 2014, to elect the Swedish delegation to the European Parliament
- 2014 Swedish general election, to elect the 349 members of the Riksdag
- 2014 Swedish county council elections, to elect the 21 county councils
- 2014 Swedish municipal elections, to elect the 290 municipal councils
