= 2014 Jämtland county election =

Regional council election in Jämtland County, Sweden

Jämtland County held a county council election on 14 September 2014, on the same day as the general and municipal elections.

== Results ==
The number of seats remained at 55 with the Social Democrats winning the most at 21, a drop of three from 2010. The party received near 38.6% of a valid vote of 81,485.

Party	Votes	%	Seats	±
Social Democrats	31,430	38.6	21	-3
Moderates	16,258	20.0	11	0
Centre Party	11,093	13.6	8	-1
Left Party	6,231	7.6	4	0
Sweden Democrats	5,451	6.7	4	+4
Green Party	4,998	6.1	3	-1
People's Party	3,007	3.7	2	-1
Christian Democrats	2,725	3.3	2	+2
Others	292	0.4	0	0
Invalid/blank votes	1,880			
Total	83,365	100	55	0
Source: val.se

== Municipalities ==
Location	Turnout	Share	Votes	S	M	C	V	SD	MP	FP	KD	Other
Berg	81.2	5.6	4,562	37.5	21.2	17.5	5.6	8.5	4.9	1.7	2.6	0.4
Bräcke	81.2	5.1	4,187	45.0	15.8	15.2	7.9	8.1	3.4	2.2	1.8	0.5
Härjedalen	79.6	8.0	6,525	42.6	21.1	12.7	6.0	9.1	2.8	2.8	2.5	0.4
Krokom	82.5	11.0	8,971	35.3	19.4	18.6	8.8	6.4	5.3	2.4	3.6	0.2
Ragunda	80.4	4.2	3,424	50.7	10.2	15.4	8.7	8.9	3.1	1.0	1.8	0.2
Strömsund	80.4	9.4	7,629	49.1	14.5	12.5	8.9	8.9	2.5	1.5	2.0	0.3
Åre	83.4	8.1	6,613	33.9	20.4	18.3	5.1	4.7	9.3	3.6	4.4	0.2
Östersund	83.9	48.6	39,574	35.8	22.0	11.3	8.0	5.7	7.7	5.2	3.9	0.4
Total	82.6	100.0	81,485	38.6	20.0	13.6	7.6	6.7	6.1	3.7	3.3	0.4
Source: val.se

== Images ==
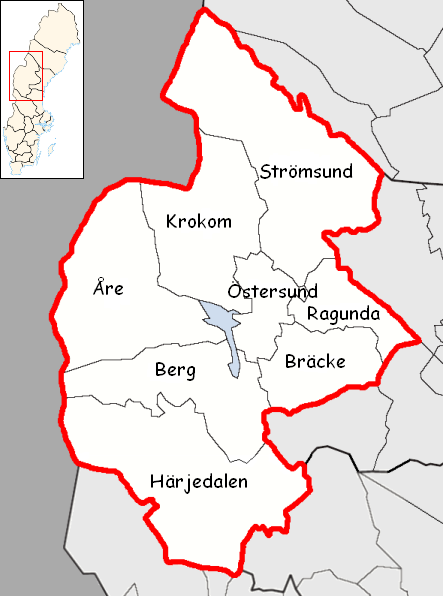
