= 2014 Halland county election =

Regional council election in Halland County, Sweden

Halland County held a county council election on 14 September 2014, on the same day as the general and municipal elections.

== Results ==
The number of seats remained at 71 with the Social Democrats winning the most at 23, an increase of two from in 2010. The party received 30.4% of a total valid vote of 202,352. The combined centre-right parties were still larger as a bloc, although lost their overall majority.

Party	Votes	%	Seats	±
Social Democrats	61,499	30.4	22	+2
Moderates	52,330	25.9	19	–5
Centre Party	20,092	9.9	7	0
Sweden Democrats	30,135	9.4	7	+4
People's Party	13,183	6.5	5	-1
Green Party	12,137	6.0	4	0
Left Party	9,264	4.6	3	0
Christian Democrats	8,760	4.3	3	0
Others	6,104	3.0	0	0
Invalid/blank votes	3,712			
Total	206,064	100	71	0
Source:val.se

== Municipal results ==
Location	Turnout	Share	Votes	S	M	C	SD	FP	MP	V	KD	Other
Falkenberg	83.1	13.5	27,306	35.5	19.8	14.0	10.0	4.7	5.4	4.7	4.1	1.8
Halmstad	83.7	30.7	62,072	36.1	23.1	7.5	8.6	5.5	6.2	5.4	3.8	3.6
Hylte	78.8	3.0	6,063	38.6	15.6	14.9	13.0	6.5	3.2	3.2	2.8	2.2
Kungsbacka	88.1	25.4	51,304	17.9	36.4	8.2	8.9	10.0	6.7	3.4	5.3	3.1
Laholm	82.6	7.5	15,276	27.8	23.7	14.0	13.2	4.3	5.7	3.6	4.4	3.2
Varberg	85.8	19.9	40,331	33.8	23.2	10.9	8.7	5.7	5.7	5.2	4.1	2.8
Total	84.9	100.0	202,352	30.4	25.9	9.9	9.4	6.5	6.0	4.6	4.3	3.0
Source: val.se

== Images ==
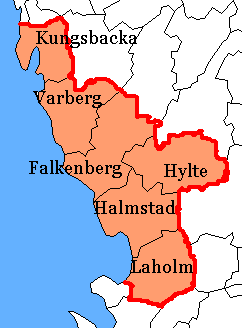
