= 2014 Värmland county election =

Värmland County or held a county council election on 14 September 2014, on the same day as the general and municipal elections.

== Results ==
The number of seats remained at 81 with the Social Democrats winning the most at 31, a drop of two from 2010. The party received 40.2% of the 179,280 valid ballots cast.

Party	Votes	%	Seats	±
Social Democrats	72,006	40.2	31	-2
Moderates	28,615	16.0	14	-2
Centre Party	15,390	8.6	7	-1
Sweden Democrats	14,991	8.4	7	+4
Health Care Party Värmland	11,381	6.3	5	0
Left Party	10,377	5.8	5	+1
Green Party	9,079	5.1	4	0
Christian Democrats	8,095	4.5	4	+1
People's Party	8,043	4.5	4	-1
Others	1,303	0.7	0	0
Invalid/blank votes	3,635			
Total	182,915	100	101	0
Source: val.se

== Municipalities ==
Location	Turnout	Share	Votes	S	M	C	SD	SV	V	MP	KD	FP	Other
Arvika	80.3	9.2	16,435	43.3	13.8	9.9	8.9	3.9	6.9	5.1	3.2	4.4	0.6
Eda	67.6	2.5	4,472	41.8	12.6	13.2	9.6	8.9	4.9	2.0	3.4	3.2	0.4
Filipstad	80.1	3.7	6,573	46.3	11.8	4.8	15.6	4.3	8.1	2.7	2.6	2.9	0.8
Forshaga	85.7	4.2	7,487	48.6	12.4	7.3	9.2	5.5	4.7	3.7	4.2	3.6	0.7
Grums	81.7	3.3	5,847	48.5	13.2	7.8	10.2	6.4	4.5	3.5	3.0	2.0	0.8
Hagfors	80.2	4.4	7,895	53.8	7.7	8.9	11.3	3.5	7.0	2.0	2.0	3.2	0.5
Hammarö	88.4	5.6	10,090	42.4	21.3	4.5	5.3	3.7	5.0	5.3	6.3	5.6	0.4
Karlstad	85.4	33.4	59,827	37.7	20.6	5.1	6.4	4.1	6.5	7.5	5.8	5.3	1.0
Kil	85.2	4.3	7,770	41.9	14.7	9.9	9.1	5.3	4.9	4.9	5.3	3.3	0.7
Kristinehamn	83.4	8.9	15,898	36.0	14.9	13.6	7.4	8.8	6.1	4.4	3.6	4.7	0.6
Munkfors	81.7	1.4	2,483	61.8	6.2	7.0	8.0	3.1	5.0	2.3	1.5	5.0	0.3
Storfors	82.3	1.5	2,636	49.8	9.9	7.2	11.5	5.7	7.2	2.3	3.9	2.1	0.3
Sunne	83.7	4.9	8,715	34.5	15.7	17.0	9.2	5.7	3.7	5.3	3.4	4.7	0.7
Säffle	82.0	5.6	9,957	24.5	12.6	11.6	11.1	29.0	2.8	2.9	3.0	2.0	0.5
Torsby	78.0	4.2	7,617	45.7	14.6	10.5	9.3	5.4	6.5	2.5	2.2	2.6	0.6
Årjäng	73.4	3.1	5,578	30.2	10.3	16.5	9.7	5.8	2.7	2.7	10.7	10.7	0.5
Total	82.7	100.0	179,280	40.2	16.0	8.6	8.4	6.3	5.8	5.1	4.5	4.5	0.7
Source: val.se
