= 2018 Kalmar regional election =

Regional council election in Kalmar County, Sweden

Kalmar County or Region Kalmar held a regional council election on 9 September 2018, on the same day as the general and municipal elections.

== Results ==
The number of seats remained at 67 with the Social Democrats winning the most at 25, a drop of two from 2014. There were 159,333 valid ballots cast.

Party	Votes	%	Seats	±
Social Democrats	55,086	34.6	25	-2
Moderates	23,264	14.6	10	-1
Sweden Democrats	22,560	14.2	10	+3
Centre Party	18,812	11.8	8	+1
Christian Democrats	16,473	10.3	7	+2
Left Party	10,088	6.3	4	0
Liberals	7,754	4.9	3	0
Green Party	4,120	2.6	0	-3
Others	1,176	0.7	0	0
Invalid/blank votes	3,269			
Total	162,602	100	61	0
Source: val.se

== Municipalities ==
Location	Turnout	Share	Votes	S	M	SD	C	KD	V	L	MP	Other
Borgholm	85.3	4.7	7,453	30.0	17.6	13.2	16.6	10.3	5.4	3.4	2.6	0.8
Emmaboda	82.8	3.7	5,946	35.6	13.4	14.3	17.3	6.4	4.9	2.1	2.3	3.7
Hultsfred	81.6	5.5	8,829	33.7	9.4	13.3	14.3	19.6	6.2	1.5	1.5	0.6
Högsby	80.6	2.2	3,571	35.3	11.0	21.3	13.6	10.8	4.3	1.7	1.3	0.6
Kalmar	86.4	28.3	45,106	36.9	16.4	12.3	8.5	8.3	7.0	6.2	3.7	0.6
Mönsterås	85.4	5.5	8,826	33.2	8.4	16.8	22.2	9.7	4.9	2.6	1.7	0.3
Mörbylånga	89.1	6.3	10,112	30.9	17.6	14.5	14.3	8.6	5.8	4.4	3.4	0.7
Nybro	82.4	7.9	12,607	35.1	12.3	16.4	14.5	9.4	6.5	3.7	1.6	0.5
Oskarshamn	85.6	11.1	17,727	34.0	15.1	17.1	6.4	12.6	7.1	5.8	1.6	0.4
Torsås	85.3	3.0	4,703	31.9	11.1	22.4	15.6	7.5	4.6	3.5	2.3	1.0
Vimmerby	85.5	6.5	10,283	29.1	11.4	11.6	15.8	21.0	6.4	1.6	2.1	1.0
Västervik	83.7	15.2	24,170	36.7	16.8	12.2	9.2	7.6	6.5	7.8	2.6	0.7
Total	85.0	34.6	159,333	34.6	14.6	14.1	11.8	10.3	6.3	4.9	2.6	0.7
Source: val.se
