= Edasjön =

- Location within Sweden
- Location: Uppland, Sweden
- Coordinates: 59°48′N 17°54′E
- Type: lake
- Surface area: 0.187 square kilometres (46 acres)

Edasjön is a lake located in Knivsta municipality, province of Uppland, Sweden. The lake has an area of 0.187 square kilometres (46 acres).
