= 2018 Blekinge regional election =

Regional council election in Blekinge County, Sweden

Blekinge Regional Council Composition

Blekinge County held a regional council election on 9 September 2018 at the same time as the general and municipal elections.

== Results ==
There were 57 seats, ten more than in 2014. The Social Democrats remained the largest party but suffered nearly seven points of a deficit from the 2014 results, going from 39.3% to 32.5%. In spite of this the increased numbers of seats meant the party remained at 19 seats. This was still a sizeably lower share. The Sweden Democrats recorded 20.6% and became the second largest party, while the Moderates made gains in spite of a nationwide drop.

Party	Votes	%	Seats	±
Social Democrats	33,974	32.5	19	0
Sweden Democrats	21,509	20.6	12	+5
Moderates	20,969	20.0	12	+3
Centre Party	7,937	7.6	5	+2
Left Party	5,967	5.7	3	0
Christian Democrats	5,349	5.1	3	+1
Liberals	5,034	4.8	3	+1
Green Party	2,925	2.8	0	–2
Others	929	0.9	0	0
Invalid/blank votes	1,937			
Total	104,593	100	57	+10
Source:val.se

== Municipal results ==
=== Percentage ===
Location	Turnout	Share	Votes	S	SD	M	C	V	KD	L	MP	Other
Karlshamn	85.3	20.4	21,339	31.7	19.2	22.8	7.3	6.0	3.8	5.0	3.4	0.8
Karlskrona	87.0	42.3	44,238	33.2	17.7	20.3	7.6	5.8	5.8	5.8	3.3	0.5
Olofström	81.2	8.1	8,458	39.0	23.2	12.7	9.0	5.9	5.8	2.4	1.4	0.6
Ronneby	85.4	18.0	18,875	30.6	23.6	19.2	8.4	6.2	4.6	4.3	2.4	0.8
Sölvesborg	85.8	11.2	11,683	29.5	27.3	20.7	5.7	4.0	5.1	3.2	1.6	2.9
Total	85.7	100.0	104,593	32.5	20.6	20.0	7.6	5.7	5.1	4.8	2.8	0.9
Source: val.se

=== By votes ===
Location	Turnout	Share	Votes	S	SD	M	C	V	KD	L	MP	Other
Karlshamn	85.3	20.4	21,339	6,761	4,089	4,857	1,559	1,281	819	1,076	716	181
Karlskrona	87.0	42.3	44,238	14,688	7,819	8,995	3,368	2,548	2,571	2,578	1,454	217
Olofström	81.2	8.1	8,458	3,299	1,963	1,076	763	500	487	201	117	52
Ronneby	85.4	18.0	18,875	5,785	4,452	3,624	1,579	1,169	873	805	446	142
Sölvesborg	85.8	11.2	11,683	3,441	3,186	2,417	668	469	599	374	192	337
Total	85.7	100.0	104,593	33,974	21,509	20,969	7,937	5,967	5,349	5,034	2,925	929
Source: val.se
