= 2010 Norrbotten county election =

Regional council election in Norrbotten County, Sweden

Norrbotten County, Sweden, held a county council election on 19 September 2010, on the same day as the general and municipal elections.

== Results ==
The number of seats remained at 71 with the Social Democrats winning the most at 33, a gain of two seats from 2006. The party received around 43.1% out of 160,783 valid votes.

Party	Votes	%	Seats	±
Social Democrats	69,307	43.1	33	+2
Health Care Party	26,321	16.4	13	0
Moderates	19,130	11.9	9	+1
Left Party	13,630	8.5	6	0
Centre Party	7,951	4.9	4	0
People's Party	6,627	4.1	3	-1
Green Party	6,484	4.0	3	+1
Christian Democrats	4,150	2.6	0	-3
Sweden Democrats	2,642	1.6	0	0
Others	4,541	2.8	0	0
Invalid/blank votes	3,093			
Total	163,876	100	71	0
Source:val.se

=== Municipalities ===
Location	Turnout	Share	Votes	S	SJV	M	V	C	FP	MP	KD	SD	Other
Arjeplog	74.9	1.2	1,876	38.9	25.2	4.2	10.7	7.0	5.3	3.1	3.1	1.4	1.1
Arvidsjaur	81.2	2.7	4,261	48.2	16.1	7.6	9.7	9.7	3.5	1.8	0.9	2.0	0.7
Boden	84.1	11.3	18,219	38.2	22.1	16.7	7.7	2.8	3.3	3.5	2.5	1.9	1.2
Gällivare	78.5	7.3	11,724	45.4	16.8	13.0	14.0	1.1	1.6	2.5	1.2	2.2	2.2
Haparanda	60.5	3.0	4,838	47.9	15.7	14.0	5.7	9.4	1.3	1.6	2.1	1.3	1.1
Jokkmokk	78.5	2.0	3,265	46.3	17.4	5.9	8.5	2.8	5.6	9.3	1.0	1.2	2.1
Kalix	81.1	6.7	10,756	49.2	16.0	10.8	5.5	5.0	3.6	5.8	1.5	1.4	1.2
Kiruna	79.6	8.9	14,232	28.6	33.3	6.5	9.8	5.3	1.7	2.1	1.9	1.8	9.0
Luleå	83.9	30.4	48,911	41.8	9.8	15.6	7.2	5.0	6.3	5.5	2.9	1.8	4.1
Pajala	79.0	2.5	4,059	47.3	12.7	7.2	18.2	2.8	1.5	1.3	6.1	1.5	1.5
Piteå	85.8	17.3	27,778	49.8	14.8	9.6	6.9	5.1	4.1	4.1	3.4	1.1	1.0
Älvsbyn	82.0	3.4	5,468	43.0	18.2	4.4	11.7	7.7	5.7	2.1	3.3	2.5	1.4
Överkalix	81.5	1.5	2,454	52.0	15.3	4.8	11.2	9.9	2.3	2.0	0.5	0.9	0.9
Övertorneå	76.5	1.8	2,942	42.6	19.3	7.6	10.5	10.2	1.8	1.8	3.0	1.0	2.2
Total	81.6	100.0	160,783	43.1	16.4	11.9	8.5	4.9	4.1	4.0	2.6	1.6	2.8
Source: val.se

== Images ==
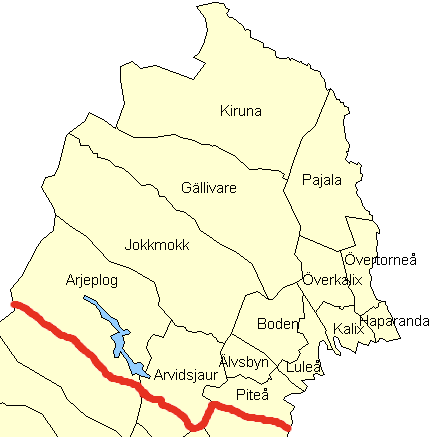
