= 2014 Västerbotten county election =

Regional council election in Västerbotten County, Sweden

Västerbotten County held a regional council election on 14 September 2014, on the same day as the general and municipal elections.

== Results ==
The number of seats remained at 71 with the Social Democrats winning the most at 30, a drop of two from 2010. The party received around 41.1% of an overall vote of 171,729.

Party	Votes	%	Seats	±
Social Democrats	70,530	41.1	30	-4
Left Party	21,321	12.4	9	+2
Moderates	20,752	12.1	9	-1
Centre Party	14,977	8.7	6	0
People's Party	14,078	8.1	6	-1
Christian Democrats	8,834	5.1	4	0
Green Party	5,892	5.0	4	0
Sweden Democrats	6,641	3.9	3	+3
Others	6,132	3.6	0	0
Invalid/blank votes	3,525			
Total	175,254	100	71	0
Source: val.se

== Municipalities ==
Location	Turnout	Share	Votes	S	V	M	C	FP	KD	MP	SD	Other
Bjurholm	82.2	0.9	1,594	35.8	4.8	20.8	15.7	8.5	6.8	1.5	5.1	1.0
Dorotea	84.3	1.1	1,848	24.5	10.1	4.0	29.2	23.9	3.7	1.7	2.7	0.3
Lycksele	81.1	4.5	7,807	44.6	10.2	14.2	6.8	6.9	9.1	1.8	5.3	1.1
Malå	79.6	1.1	1,957	44.8	18.4	6.8	7.5	11.8	3.5	1.7	4.5	1.0
Nordmaling	81.4	2.6	4,516	38.4	10.9	11.2	16.4	10.6	4.8	2.0	4.7	1.0
Norsjö	80.5	1.5	2,570	49.0	11.1	5.0	10.1	5.1	11.6	1.5	5.5	1.1
Robertsfors	82.9	2.6	4,392	43.8	9.0	8.9	20.3	4.1	5.9	2.6	3.5	1.9
Skellefteå	84.4	27.7	47,600	50.0	10.4	8.9	7.0	9.0	4.3	4.5	4.1	1.7
Sorsele	76.1	0.9	1,508	35.3	17.0	10.1	18.4	2.3	6.3	2.0	7.4	1.3
Storuman	79.1	2.2	3,743	37.4	12.2	10.6	18.3	6.1	7.5	1.8	5.1	0.9
Umeå	85.2	46.0	78,954	36.5	14.3	15.0	5.8	8.2	4.4	6.9	3.1	5.9
Vilhelmina	82.5	2.5	4,332	39.4	11.9	5.6	21.0	3.8	8.2	1.7	6.3	2.1
Vindeln	82.3	2.0	3,513	39.0	8.3	13.0	13.9	4.1	12.1	2.5	5.1	2.0
Vännäs	84.2	3.2	5,510	38.0	14.0	10.6	14.0	5.4	6.5	4.2	5.3	2.1
Åsele	81.8	1.1	1,885	28.7	11.4	9.7	28.1	11.4	3.3	1.6	5.0	0.8
Total	84.0	100.0	171,729	41.1	12.4	12.1	8.7	8.1	5.1	5.0	3.9	3.6
Source: val.se

== Images ==
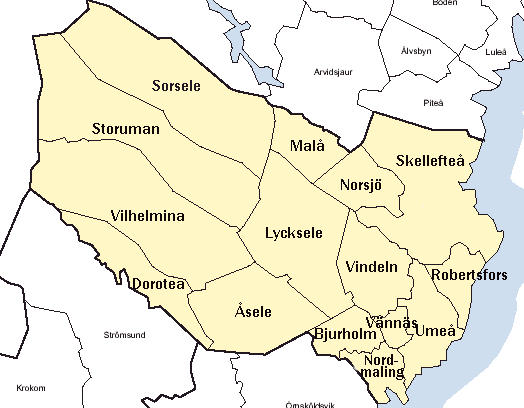
