= 2010 Gävleborg county election =

Regional council election in Gävleborg County, Sweden

Gävleborg County held a county council election on 19 September 2010, on the same day as the general and municipal elections.

== Results ==
The number of seats remained at 75 with the Social Democrats winning the most at 28, a drop of one from 2006. The party gained 36.8% of an overall valid vote of 172,739.

Party	Votes	%	Seats	±
Social Democrats	63,514	36.7	28	-1
Moderates	34,623	20.0	15	+2
Centre Party	13,395	7.8	6	-4
Left Party	12,643	7.3	6	0
People's Party	10,832	6.3	5	0
Sweden Democrats	10,284	6.0	4	+4
Health Care Party	10,093	5.8	4	-1
Green Party	9,442	5.5	4	+1
Christian Democrats	7,536	4.4	3	-1
Others	317	0.2	0	0
Invalid/blank votes	4,266			
Total	177,005	100	75	0
Source: val.se

== Municipalities ==
Location	Turnout	Share	Votes	S	M	C	V	FP	SD	SJP	MP	KD	Other
Bollnäs	77.8	9.2	15,931	30.5	14.8	11.5	6.1	8.6	6.2	14.7	3.8	3.6	0.1
Gävle	82.1	34.9	60,300	34.4	26.7	4.0	6.8	7.4	6.7	2.6	7.3	3.7	0.3
Hofors	79.1	3.5	6,081	47.8	13.4	4.1	11.3	5.1	6.1	4.4	4.1	3.6	0.1
Hudiksvall	78.7	13.1	22,589	34.2	18.7	11.0	9.2	5.6	4.1	3.8	5.9	7.2	0.1
Ljusdal	75.1	6.5	11,168	35.4	19.0	11.4	8.3	5.1	5.1	7.6	4.8	3.2	0.1
Nordanstig	77.5	3.4	5,829	35.8	12.5	12.6	6.7	12.0	6.6	4.8	5.7	3.3	0.2
Ockelbo	80.4	2.2	3,789	44.9	15.1	14.2	5.3	3.1	6.1	3.9	4.3	3.1	0.1
Ovanåker	78.9	4.1	7,145	33.4	11.6	17.4	2.9	5.1	3.3	13.4	2.8	10.0	0.1
Sandviken	81.2	13.5	23,348	43.3	18.6	5.3	8.6	4.8	5.2	5.9	4.5	3.6	0.1
Söderhamn	80.7	9.6	16,559	42.5	15.2	8.2	6.3	3.6	7.8	8.8	4.4	3.2	0.1
Total	80.1	100.0	172,739	36.8	20.0	7.8	7.3	6.3	6.0	5.8	5.5	4.4	0.2
Source: val.se

== Images ==
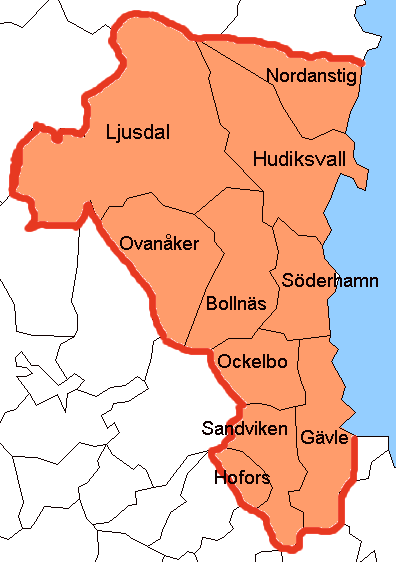
