= 2018 Skåne regional election =

Skåne County or Region Skåne (English: Scania County) held a regional council election on 9 September 2018, on the same day as the general and municipal elections.

== Results ==
The number of seats remained at 149 with the Social Democrats winning the most at 41, a drop of ten from 2014.

Party	Votes	%	Seats	±
Social Democrats	230,625	27.3	41	-10
Moderates	190,857	22.6	34	-1
Sweden Democrats	166,195	19.7	30	+7
Left Party	56,745	6.7	10	+2
Liberals	53,468	6.3	10	+1
Centre Party	53,400	6.3	10	+3
Christian Democrats	45,717	5.4	8	+3
Green Party	34,496	4.1	6	-5
Others	13,099	1.6	0	0
Invalid/blank votes	12,698			
Total	844,602	100	149	0
Source: val.se

== Municipalities ==
Location	Turnout	Share	Votes	S	M	SD	V	L	C	KD	MP	Other
Bjuv	76.4	1.0	8,724	33.1	15.3	34.5	3.5	2.6	3.8	4.9	1.7	0.7
Bromölla	84.5	1.0	8,104	32.5	13.5	32.8	3.8	4.5	3.3	4.7	1.9	3.0
Burlöv	76.2	1.2	10,104	34.2	19.8	21.6	6.4	5.3	4.7	3.5	3.1	1.3
Båstad	86.0	1.2	10,086	18.4	31.5	15.3	3.4	5.9	12.4	8.6	3.7	0.9
Eslöv	83.4	2.5	20,818	29.3	18.2	25.2	5.6	4.3	8.3	4.2	3.2	1.5
Helsingborg	81.5	10.5	89,016	29.1	24.7	20.1	5.1	5.1	4.8	6.1	3.8	1.1
Hässleholm	83.3	3.9	33,227	27.4	17.5	26.5	4.5	4.4	7.5	8.0	3.1	1.2
Höganäs	85.9	2.1	17,411	22.1	31.1	15.0	3.8	6.9	7.3	8.6	4.3	1.0
Hörby	83.8	1.2	10,090	20.0	17.3	32.4	4.5	5.5	9.6	6.7	2.7	1.3
Höör	85.9	1.3	10,752	20.1	20.3	23.9	6.6	6.6	8.3	6.1	5.4	2.8
Klippan	78.6	1.3	10,603	25.9	17.8	31.8	4.1	3.2	6.0	7.8	2.3	1.0
Kristianstad	83.8	6.4	54,021	27.2	20.7	22.6	4.4	9.7	5.8	5.9	2.7	0.8
Kävlinge	89.1	2.4	20,351	25.2	28.8	20.3	2.7	7.0	7.0	4.9	3.2	0.9
Landskrona	79.3	3.2	27,086	34.5	15.7	21.0	5.4	11.1	3.8	4.2	2.9	1.3
Lomma	92.5	1.9	16,256	19.6	36.9	12.0	2.5	10.4	7.3	7.0	3.6	0.8
Lund	86.2	9.4	79,807	25.5	18.9	10.1	10.7	10.8	8.0	5.0	8.5	2.6
Malmö	78.3	23.5	198,178	31.1	20.3	15.1	12.3	5.6	4.9	3.4	5.1	2.3
Osby	82.2	1.0	8,258	31.2	16.7	25.8	4.1	2.6	9.4	7.4	2.1	0.7
Perstorp	76.2	0.5	4,089	32.1	16.4	29.3	3.6	2.8	6.5	6.2	2.5	0.7
Simrishamn	84.5	1.6	13,171	24.5	23.8	19.0	5.5	6.9	7.9	5.4	4.7	2.2
Sjöbo	83.1	1.5	12,274	19.8	21.4	32.3	3.5	3.1	7.9	8.1	2.4	1.5
Skurup	85.0	1.2	10,075	25.3	23.4	28.2	4.3	4.1	7.2	4.0	2.5	0.9
Staffanstorp	88.5	1.9	15,743	24.5	33.9	15.1	3.4	6.7	6.4	5.5	3.7	0.9
Svalöv	83.2	1.0	8,659	24.7	15.2	30.4	5.0	4.1	11.3	4.9	2.6	1.8
Svedala	88.9	1.6	13,783	23.4	24.8	27.5	3.2	5.4	5.7	5.2	3.3	1.4
Tomelilla	83.0	1.0	8,556	23.8	19.5	26.4	4.6	3.3	13.4	4.6	2.9	1.4
Trelleborg	83.2	3.4	28,473	26.6	23.7	26.5	3.9	4.4	5.2	5.9	2.8	1.0
Vellinge	92.0	3.0	25,006	11.2	46.0	16.3	1.4	9.3	6.0	6.5	2.4	0.8
Ystad	86.2	2.4	20,482	28.7	24.5	18.4	3.9	5.0	8.3	6.4	3.6	1.3
Åstorp	76.9	1.0	8,841	32.3	17.9	30.3	3.9	3.6	5.0	4.9	1.4	0.7
Ängelholm	84.8	3.3	27,478	25.1	28.8	18.9	3.7	4.2	8.1	7.4	2.9	1.0
Örkelljunga	80.6	0.7	6,236	21.8	19.2	30.7	2.7	2.4	6.3	12.6	2.3	2.0
Östra Göinge	82.8	1.0	8,844	31.3	23.1	23.8	3.8	3.1	6.2	6.5	1.7	0.5
Total	82.6	100.0	844,602	27.3	22.6	19.7	6.7	6.3	6.3	5.4	4.1	1.6
Source: val.se

== Images ==
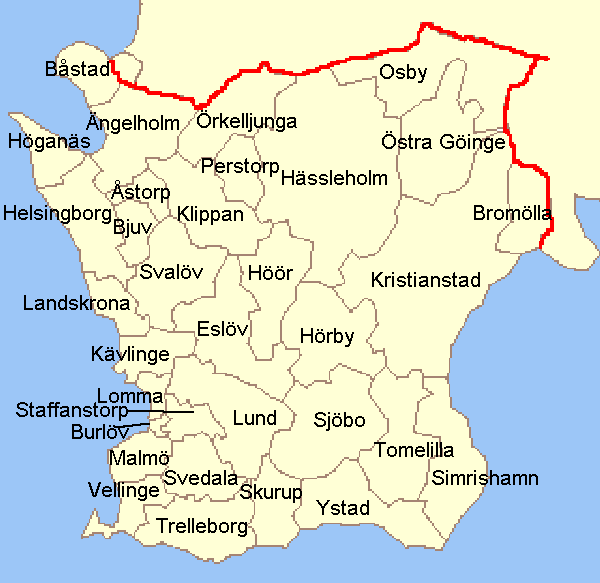
