= 2014 Östergötland county election =

Östergötland County held a county council election on 14 September 2014, on the same day as the general and municipal elections.

== Results ==
The number of seats remained at 101 with the Social Democrats winning the most at 37, an increase of two from 2010.

Party	Votes	%	Seats	±
Social Democrats	104,426	36.4	37	+2
Moderates	62,967	22.0	23	-2
Sweden Democrats	27,715	9.7	10	+6
Green Party	19,227	6.7	7	0
Left Party	17,467	6.1	6	+1
People's Party	17,348	6.1	6	0
Centre Party	16,799	5.9	6	0
Christian Democrats	16,671	5.8	6	+1
Others	4,071	1.4	0	-8
Invalid/blank votes	5,707			
Total	292,400	100	101	0
Source: val.se

== Municipalities ==
Location	Turnout	Share	Votes	S	M	SD	MP	V	FP	C	KD	Other
Boxholm	86.1	1.2	3,574	48.8	14.7	9.1	4.1	4.6	3.9	9.3	4.9	0.5
Finspång	83.6	4.8	13,684	46.0	15.9	10.0	4.9	7.3	4.4	5.3	5.3	1.0
Kinda	86.0	2.3	6,585	34.3	17.7	12.0	5.7	5.0	4.1	11.1	7.6	2.6
Linköping	84.9	34.5	99,012	33.9	23.3	7.7	8.2	5.8	7.7	5.6	6.4	1.5
Mjölby	83.5	6.0	17,093	40.4	20.4	9.8	4.5	5.9	5.5	6.8	5.6	1.3
Motala	84.4	9.7	27,857	43.0	19.0	10.2	5.2	5.9	5.9	5.0	4.1	1.6
Norrköping	82.7	29.8	85,367	34.5	23.7	11.2	6.9	7.2	5.7	4.1	5.4	1.4
Söderköping	86.4	3.3	9,563	31.8	25.0	10.3	5.7	4.9	5.2	9.0	6.9	1.2
Vadstena	85.9	1.8	5,130	36.4	25.5	7.3	7.0	5.0	3.7	7.0	7.1	1.0
Valdemarsvik	84.8	1.8	5,206	39.6	18.8	11.1	3.5	4.4	3.4	12.3	4.9	2.0
Ydre	86.8	0.9	2,504	31.7	18.1	8.7	5.4	2.6	3.0	20.2	9.5	0.7
Åtvidaberg	85.9	2.7	7,686	44.0	17.8	12.8	4.5	4.2	3.2	8.1	4.7	0.8
Ödeshög	83.9	1.2	3,432	32.7	16.1	11.2	6.9	3.8	2.7	13.1	12.8	0.7
Total	84.2	100.0	286,693	36.4	22.0	9.7	6.7	6.1	6.1	5.9	5.8	1.4
Source: val.se

== Images ==
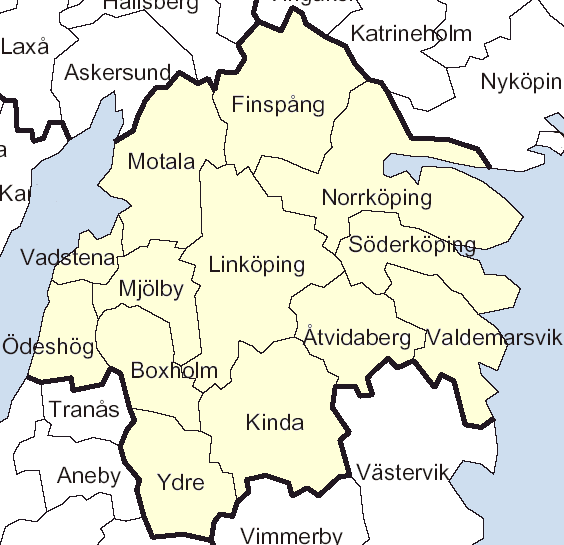
