= 2014 Västernorrland county election =

Regional council election in Västernorrland County, Sweden

Västernorrland County held a county council election on 14 September 2014 on the same day as the general and municipal elections.

== Results ==
The number of seats remained at 77 with the Social Democrats winning the most at 38, an increase of six from in 2010. The party received just below 48% of the overall vote of 158,428.

Party	Votes	%	Seats	±
Social Democrats	75,976	48.0	38	+6
Moderates	22,684	14.3	11	–7
Centre Party	12,063	7.6	6	0
Sweden Democrats	11,855	7.5	6	+6
Left Party	10,941	6.9	6	+1
People's Party	7,018	4.4	4	0
Green Party	6,912	4.4	3	0
Christian Democrats	6,850	4.3	3	0
Others	4,129	2.6	0	-6
Invalid/blank votes	2,931			
Total	161,359	100	77	0
Source:val.se

== Municipalities ==
Location	Turnout	Share	Votes	S	M	C	SD	V	FP	MP	KD	Other
Härnösand	82.9	10.1	15,971	46.4	14.1	7.4	7.3	8.4	3.8	8.2	3.4	1.1
Kramfors	82.0	7.7	12,206	51.6	9.0	12.1	6.6	9.2	2.3	3.6	2.6	3.0
Sollefteå	82.1	8.2	12,926	47.6	8.3	6.9	5.3	6.2	1.9	2.4	1.6	19.8
Sundsvall	83.6	40.0	63,405	45.3	18.6	5.1	9.1	6.8	6.1	4.8	3.6	0.6
Timrå	83.2	7.3	11,570	53.2	11.2	5.2	10.2	8.0	5.3	3.4	3.1	0.4
Ånge	81.3	4.0	6,275	55.7	9.5	8.0	10.5	6.1	1.7	1.9	6.0	0.6
Örnsköldsvik	84.1	22.8	36,075	49.2	12.7	11.6	4.5	5.6	3.6	3.6	7.6	1.5
Total	83.3	100.0	158,424	48.0	14.3	7.6	7.5	6.9	4.4	4.4	4.3	2.6
Source: val.se
