= 2018 Stockholm regional election =

Regional council election in Stockholm County, Sweden

Stockholm County or Region Stockholm held a regional council election on 9 September 2018 on the same day as the general and municipal elections.

== Results ==
Stockholm regional council

There were 149 seats, the same number as in 2014. The Social Democrats supplanted the Moderates as the largest party. However, after protracted negotiations, a majority Blue-Green government was formed between the Alliance parties and the Green Party. Previously, the Alliance parties had a majority since the 2014 regional elections, but losses to the Sweden Democrats necessitated the formation of a cross-bloc coalition with the Greens to gather a governing majority, as the Alliance parties wished to avoid relying on the Sweden Democrats.

Party	Votes	%	Seats	±
Social Democrats	379,008	26.2	40	–1
Moderates	321,783	22.3	34	–9
Left Party	152,784	10.6	16	+4
Sweden Democrats	140,773	9.7	15	+6
Centre Party	115,785	8.0	12	+5
Liberals	115,746	8.0	12	–1
Christian Democrats	111,877	7.7	12	+3
Green Party	81,404	5.6	8	–7
Others	25,627	1.8	0	0
Invalid/blank votes	15,511			
Total	1,444,787	100	149	0
Source:val.se

== Municipal & Stockholm ward results ==
Stockholm Municipality was divided into six separate electoral wards (Södermalm-Enskede, Bromma-Kungsholmen, Norrmalm-Östermalm-Gamla Stan, Östra Söderort, Västra Söderort and Yttre Västerort) and its results were not counted as a unit. These wards have in these lists been translated to English to shorten columns.

Location	Turnout	Share	Votes	S	M	V	SD	C	L	KD	MP	Other
Botkyrka	71.2	3.3	47,318	35.2	17.7	10.3	12.5	4.4	4.7	9.7	4.0	1.4
Danderyd	90.0	1.5	21,522	12.0	34.0	2.6	6.2	11.3	14.1	14.8	3.7	1.3
Ekerö	89.0	1.2	17,772	20.3	26.1	5.0	11.5	10.2	9.3	11.1	5.3	1.2
Haninge	78.2	3.6	51,412	29.4	22.5	8.8	16.2	6.0	5.3	6.3	4.2	1.3
Huddinge	78.9	4.4	62,877	29.6	22.8	9.5	11.9	6.4	6.5	6.7	5.1	1.6
Järfälla	81.6	3.2	46,825	30.8	22.0	9.6	11.7	5.4	6.6	8.1	4.4	1.4
Lidingö	87.6	2.1	30,918	15.3	29.8	4.3	7.1	12.4	12.6	12.9	4.4	1.2
Nacka	86.3	4.5	64,556	22.1	27.0	7.2	7.7	12.0	8.7	7.8	5.9	1.5
Norrtälje	84.1	2.8	40,791	28.4	21.9	6.5	15.7	9.9	6.2	6.8	3.6	1.0
Nykvarn	87.4	0.5	6,815	27.5	26.0	3.6	17.9	7.8	5.4	8.0	3.1	0.7
Nynäshamn	81.5	1.2	17,739	30.6	21.7	6.9	17.0	6.3	4.9	7.8	3.8	1.0
Salem	84.0	0.7	10,139	26.8	24.9	6.5	11.4	7.1	8.5	9.7	4.0	1.1
Sigtuna	76.5	1.8	26,419	29.1	25.5	6.6	13.6	6.5	5.3	9.0	3.4	1.1
Sollentuna	84.3	3.1	44,245	25.5	26.2	6.7	7.9	7.9	9.9	9.6	5.0	1.3
Solna	82.3	3.6	51,887	27.9	23.0	10.5	7.6	7.7	8.1	7.1	6.4	1.8
Stockholm NE	88.0	7.5	108,367	15.6	30.6	7.1	6.9	9.9	12.5	10.1	5.5	1.8
Stockholm NW	71.9	5.9	84,691	35.6	16.9	14.7	8.7	5.2	6.0	5.8	5.2	1.8
Stockholm S	88.7	8.4	120,690	25.8	15.1	19.0	6.6	8.7	7.9	4.9	9.2	2.9
Stockholm SE	80.8	6.7	97,108	30.5	13.2	20.8	9.2	5.9	5.3	4.4	7.6	3.1
Stockholm SW	82.0	6.9	100,218	29.7	15.6	18.4	7.8	7.1	6.4	4.8	7.6	2.7
Stockholm W	88.5	7.4	106,209	20.0	25.1	8.8	6.9	10.8	11.9	8.0	6.6	2.0
Sundbyberg	80.3	2.1	30,691	30.4	20.9	11.6	9.2	7.3	7.0	6.3	5.7	1.5
Södertälje	69.4	3.4	49,805	31.0	18.1	8.2	14.1	5.8	5.6	11.1	4.7	1.5
Tyresö	86.6	2.1	30,542	29.0	24.2	6.8	12.4	7.1	7.6	7.4	4.4	1.1
Täby	88.6	3.2	46,594	17.4	32.5	3.4	7.7	9.9	12.8	11.4	3.7	1.2
Upplands-Bro	81.6	1.2	16,850	29.0	22.3	7.1	15.8	5.4	6.7	9.4	3.3	1.0
Upplands Väsby	79.3	1.8	26,564	30.8	22.1	8.6	13.5	5.5	5.8	8.5	3.9	1.3
Vallentuna	87.0	1.5	21,054	22.3	26.1	5.1	12.9	9.8	8.7	9.5	4.5	1.1
Vaxholm	89.8	0.5	7,934	21.0	25.8	5.5	8.1	14.1	8.5	11.0	4.9	1.2
Värmdö	87.1	2.0	28,243	25.5	25.4	6.2	12.7	9.8	6.5	7.8	4.6	1.5
Österåker	85.3	1.9	27,992	23.7	28.7	5.3	10.9	9.0	8.0	9.3	4.1	1.0
Total	82.4	100.0	1,444,787	26.2	22.3	10.6	9.7	8.0	8.0	7.7	5.6	1.8
Source: val.se
