= 2010 Uppsala county election =

Uppsala County held a county council election on 19 September 2010, on the same day as the general and municipal elections.

== Results ==
The number of seats remained at 71 with the Social Democrats winning the most at 22, a loss of one from 2006. The party received 31.1% of a valid vote of 212,057.

Party	Votes	%	Seats	±
Social Democrats	66,022	31.1	22	-1
Moderates	58,127	27.4	20	+2
Green Party	18,491	8.7	6	+2
People's Party	17,888	8.4	6	-2
Centre Party	16,853	7.9	6	-2
Left Party	13,268	6.3	4	-1
Christian Democrats	11,201	5.3	4	-1
Sweden Democrats	7,679	3.6	3	+3
Others	2,528	1.2	0	0
Invalid/blank votes	4,383			
Total	216,440	100	71	0
Source: val.se

== Municipalities ==
Location	Turnout	Share	Votes	S	M	MP	FP	C	V	KD	SD	Other
Enköping	81.9	11.7	24,838	32.5	31.4	6.1	5.0	12.1	3.8	4.1	4.2	0.7
Heby	78.3	3.8	8,064	36.5	18.4	4.2	6.1	18.4	5.3	5.0	5.2	1.0
Håbo	82.9	5.6	11,844	33.7	35.2	5.0	8.8	5.4	3.0	4.1	3.9	0.8
Knivsta	86.2	4.2	8,861	24.6	36.0	6.5	11.1	7.2	3.9	6.7	3.1	0.9
Tierp	81.8	6.0	12,774	47.8	17.0	4.8	4.5	11.8	5.1	3.0	5.3	0.7
Uppsala	83.8	59.7	126,521	27.2	27.8	11.1	9.9	6.0	7.6	6.1	3.0	1.4
Älvkarleby	81.2	2.7	5,709	53.0	16.7	4.6	5.3	3.6	6.3	2.2	6.9	1.3
Östhammar	80.5	6.3	13,446	39.4	24.2	4.3	5.7	12.8	4.4	3.9	4.4	0.9
Total	83.0	100.0	212,057	31.1	27.4	8.7	8.4	7.9	6.3	5.3	3.6	1.2
Source: val.se
