= 2018 Västmanland regional election =

Västmanland County or Region Västmanland held a regional council election on 9 September 2018, on the same day as the general and municipal elections.

== Results ==
The number of seats remained at 77 with the Social Democrats winning the most at 27, a drop of three from 2014. Among the traditional national blocs, the leftist parties received 44.0% and the centre-right parties 40.2%. Since the Green Party did not receive enough votes to gain seats, the seat share was the much closer 33–32.

Party	Votes	%	Seats	±
Social Democrats	57,522	33.3	27	-3
Moderates	35,214	20.4	16	-1
Sweden Democrats	25,910	15.2	12	+4
Left Party	13,657	7.9	6	0
Liberals	11,772	6.8	6	+1
Centre Party	11,641	6.7	5	+1
Christian Democrats	10,637	6.2	5	+2
Green Party	4,672	2.7	0	-4
Others	1,487	0.9	0	0
Invalid/blank votes	3,215			
Total	172,512	100	77	0
Source: val.se

== Municipalities ==
Location	Turnout	Share	Votes	S	M	SD	V	L	C	KD	MP	Other
Arboga	83.6	5.3	9,080	36.3	21.6	15.7	6.2	5.2	6.2	5.3	2.9	0.7
Fagersta	79.4	4.6	7,856	44.3	14.3	16.0	11.0	4.1	3.2	4.2	1.9	1.1
Hallstahammar	82.1	5.9	10,138	39.0	17.3	16.1	8.5	5.4	5.3	5.7	2.1	0.7
Kungsör	84.8	3.1	5,373	34.9	17.0	18.3	6.4	4.8	10.1	5.9	2.0	0.8
Köping	82.2	9.5	16,472	37.5	15.7	19.7	6.9	4.1	7.2	6.3	2.0	0.7
Norberg	83.1	2.1	3,622	44.6	12.9	13.9	10.2	4.9	5.7	4.6	1.4	1.8
Sala	85.2	8.6	14,777	31.8	15.1	16.7	6.2	4.7	15.9	6.0	2.4	1.2
Skinnskatteberg	81.9	1.7	2,851	42.4	9.4	19.7	6.8	7.9	6.5	4.2	1.5	1.6
Surahammar	80.8	3.6	6,184	38.1	15.4	21.8	9.0	4.0	4.0	5.2	1.8	0.7
Västerås	83.8	55.7	96,159	30.0	23.9	13.0	8.2	8.5	5.8	6.7	3.2	0.8
Total	83.3	100.0	172,512	33.3	20.4	15.0	7.9	6.8	6.7	6.2	2.7	0.9
Source: val.se

== Images ==
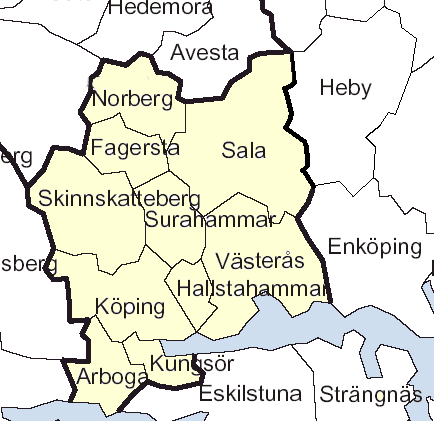
