= 2018 Kronoberg regional election =

Regional council election in Kronoberg County, Sweden

Kronoberg County or Region Kronoberg held a regional council election on 9 September 2018, on the same day as the general and municipal elections.

== Results ==
The number of seats remained at 61 with the Social Democrats winning the most at 19, a drop of three from 2014.

Party	Votes	%	Seats	±
Social Democrats	38,660	31.0	19	-3
Moderates	28,270	22.7	14	+1
Sweden Democrats	15,820	12.7	8	+2
Centre Party	13,639	10.9	7	0
Christian Democrats	45,717	7.5	5	+2
Left Party	9,052	7.3	5	0
Liberals	5,039	4.0	3	+1
Green Party	3,659	2.9	0	-3
Others	1,199	1.0	0	0
Invalid/blank votes	2,645			
Total	124,729	100	61	0
Source: val.se

== Municipalities ==
Location	Turnout	Share	Votes	S	M	SD	C	KD	V	L	MP	Other
Alvesta	84.9	10.0	12,488	30.7	21.6	15.7	12.6	7.2	6.4	2.7	2.3	0.9
Lessebo	84.0	4.2	5,207	41.7	15.8	14.6	9.3	4.9	7.8	2.7	2.7	0.6
Ljungby	81.8	14.3	17,856	28.3	23.6	16.1	11.6	5.7	7.4	4.4	2.1	0.9
Markaryd	79.0	4.8	5,967	29.1	18.3	21.6	8.0	14.7	3.4	1.8	1.9	1.2
Tingsryd	82.2	6.3	7,875	30.2	18.0	16.9	16.0	8.8	5.4	1.8	1.9	1.0
Uppvidinge	81.7	4.6	5,799	31.2	14.5	19.0	16.0	6.6	6.9	2.6	1.5	1.7
Växjö	86.4	47.6	59,361	31.1	25.4	8.7	9.0	7.2	8.9	5.0	3.7	0.9
Älmhult	82.7	8.2	10,176	31.7	20.4	12.9	14.7	6.9	5.3	4.0	3.1	0.9
Total	84.3	100.0	124,729	31.0	22.7	12.7	10.9	7.5	7.2	4.0	2.9	1.1
Source: val.se
