= 2018 Dalarna regional election =

Regional council election in Dalarna County, Sweden

Dalarna County in Sweden held a regional council election on 9 September 2018 on the same day as the general and municipal elections.

== Results ==
The number of seats remained at 83 with the Social Democrats winning the most at 24, a drop of five from in 2014. The party declined from 34.2% to 28.6% of the popular vote.

Party	Votes	%	Seats	±
Social Democrats	53,466	28.6	24	–5
Moderates	35,291	18.9	16	0
Sweden Democrats	22,586	12.1	10	+2
Centre Party	21,243	11.4	9	-1
Left Party	14,248	7.6	6	0
Dalarna Health Care Party	13,170	7.0	6	+2
Christian Democrats	13,169	7.0	6	+3
Liberals	6,816	3.6	3	0
Green Party	5,780	3.1	3	–1
Others	1,102	0.6	0	0
Invalid/blank votes	4,197			
Total	191,068	100	83	0
Source:val.se

== Municipalities ==
Location	Turnout	Share	Votes	S	M	SD	C	V	DSP	KD	L	MP	Other
Avesta	83.0	7.9	14,728	36.5	21.6	13.4	6.3	6.0	5.7	4.7	3.7	1.8	0.5
Borlänge	85.1	17.8	33,174	30.5	19.2	13.8	8.4	8.1	4.3	5.9	4.3	4.1	1.2
Falun	86.7	20.9	39,017	24.8	22.9	9.2	12.8	10.1	4.5	5.9	5.1	4.4	0.3
Gagnef	87.5	3.6	6,751	24.3	14.7	11.7	18.0	5.3	7.0	12.3	3.7	2.5	0.6
Hedemora	82.4	5.2	9,762	29.9	17.9	13.8	10.9	7.6	7.1	6.6	3.2	2.5	0.6
Leksand	87.2	5.7	10,690	22.6	19.8	8.5	14.9	7.8	7.7	12.2	3.5	2.7	0.4
Ludvika	83.9	9.1	17,052	31.5	18.7	15.0	7.2	8.7	6.7	4.6	2.8	3.7	1.1
Malung-Sälen	83.3	3.5	6,614	29.2	22.0	14.1	9.4	6.1	7.8	6.2	3.5	1.3	0.4
Mora	83.1	7.1	13,302	25.1	13.4	9.7	14.9	5.7	15.5	10.8	2.5	2.2	0.3
Orsa	83.9	2.4	4,503	25.9	10.2	12.9	16.0	7.6	12.0	9.4	2.6	2.8	0.6
Rättvik	84.8	4.0	7,477	23.3	20.1	13.2	14.8	5.2	11.0	7.7	2.6	2.0	0.3
Smedjebacken	85.0	3.9	7,310	38.7	15.8	13.9	7.6	7.1	7.2	4.7	2.3	2.3	0.3
Säter	86.9	4.0	7,463	29.5	19.2	12.2	14.6	6.2	6.3	6.4	3.2	2.0	0.5
Vansbro	84.1	2.3	4,389	26.5	11.1	10.9	16.3	6.9	7.9	16.6	2.2	1.3	0.4
Älvdalen	83.7	2.5	4,639	34.3	10.3	14.0	13.8	3.6	15.5	5.3	1.5	1.4	0.3
Total	85.0	100.0	186,871	28.6	18.9	12.1	11.4	7.6	7.0	7.0	3.6	3.1	0.6
Source:val.se

== Images ==
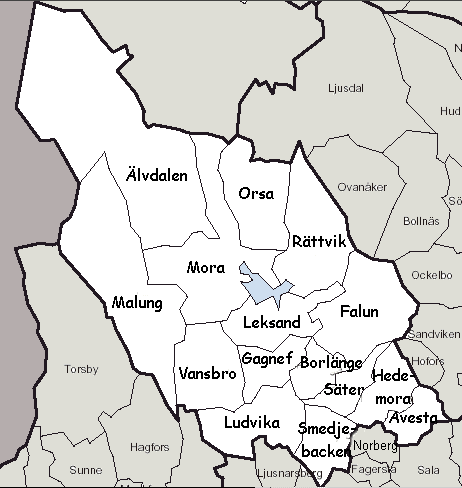
