= 2018 Jönköping regional election =

Jönköping County or Region Jönköping held a regional council election on 9 September 2018, on the same day as the general and municipal elections.

== Results ==
The number of seats remained at 81 with the Social Democrats winning the most at 22, a drop of seven from 2014. There were 228,295 valid ballots cast. New party Bevara akutsjukhusen ("Maintain the emergency hospitals") became the largest party in Eksjö and Värnamo.

Party	Votes	%	Seats	±
Social Democrats	60,534	26.4	22	-7
Moderates	35,413	15.5	13	-2
Sweden Democrats	22,560	13.6	11	+2
Christian Democrats	29,012	12.7	10	0
Centre Party	21,680	9.5	8	+1
Bevara akutsjukhusen	20,356	8.9	7	+7
Left Party	11,246	4.9	4	0
Liberals	8,911	3.9	3	0
Green Party	7,531	3.3	3	-1
Others	3,093	1.4	0	0
Invalid/blank votes	3,269			
Total	232,345	100	81	0
Source: val.se

== Municipal results ==
Location	Turnout	Share	Votes	S	M	SD	KD	C	BA	V	L	MP	Other
Aneby	87.4	2.0	4,501	22.1	13.7	13.8	12.8	13.7	10.2	3.2	6.2	3.1	1.2
Eksjö	85.1	4.9	11,326	19.1	10.1	10.2	7.2	11.5	32.0	3.7	2.2	2.2	1.8
Gislaved	80.4	7.8	17,799	27.7	16.5	15.1	7.4	12.6	9.8	3.8	3.3	2.6	1.2
Gnosjö	81.3	2.6	5,949	25.4	16.3	15.7	13.1	8.2	14.0	2.2	2.6	1.4	1.0
Habo	90.5	3.3	7,575	25.5	20.5	13.9	17.2	7.3	1.9	4.0	5.0	2.9	1.7
Jönköping	85.0	39.0	89,334	28.1	16.9	12.4	15.4	8.6	1.8	6.4	4.7	4.5	1.1
Mullsjö	86.8	2.1	4,758	25.9	17.7	15.9	18.6	6.8	0.9	5.3	2.9	4.6	1.5
Nässjö	84.6	8.6	19,729	27.3	12.6	17.5	11.6	7.7	10.0	5.1	3.7	2.9	1.6
Sävsjö	83.5	3.1	7,112	21.3	14.9	16.2	19.1	10.0	10.4	3.1	1.9	1.5	1.6
Tranås	85.0	5.3	12,216	30.9	16.6	16.6	9.6	8.1	3.9	5.3	4.3	3.5	1.2
Vaggeryd	84.5	3.8	8,692	28.5	14.4	13.8	12.5	10.2	7.1	3.6	4.2	2.7	2.9
Vetlanda	84.4	7.7	17,585	25.7	15.3	13.7	11.6	11.5	11.3	4.1	3.1	2.2	1.4
Värnamo	85.1	9.8	22,319	22.3	12.1	11.6	7.3	10.6	27.4	2.9	2.7	1.8	1.3
Total	84.6	100.0	228,895	26.4	15.5	13.6	12.7	9.5	8.9	4.9	3.9	3.3	1.4
Source: val.se
