= Uppsala County =

County (län) of Sweden

Uppsala County Uppsala län (Swedish)
- County of Sweden
- Flag Coat of arms

- Uppsala County in Sweden

- Location map of Uppsala County in Sweden
- Coordinates: 59°51′30″N 17°39′00″E
- Country: Sweden
- Formed: 1634
- Capital: Uppsala
- Municipalities: 8: Älvkarleby; Enköping; Håbo; Heby; Knivsta; Östhammar; Tierp; Uppsala

Government
  - Governor: Stefan Attefall (Christian Democrats)
  - Council: Region Uppsala

Area
  - Total: 8,207.2 km^{2} (3,168.8 sq mi)

Population (30 September 2023)
  - Total: 404,589
  - Density: 49.297/km^{2} (127.68/sq mi)

GDP
  - Total: SEK 142 billion €15.193 billion (2015)
- Time zone: UTC+1 (CET)
  - Summer (DST): UTC+2 (CEST)
- ISO 3166 code: SE-C
- NUTS Region: SE121
- Website: www.lansstyrelsen.se/uppsala/

Uppsala County (Swedish: Uppsala län, pronounced [ˈɵpːˌsɑːla lɛːn]) is a county or län on the eastern coast of Sweden, whose capital is the city of Uppsala. It borders the counties of Dalarna, Stockholm, Södermanland, Västmanland, Gävleborg, and the Baltic Sea.

== Province ==
The northern parts of the province of Uppland encompasses Uppsala County.

== Geography ==
Sätra Nature Reserve is located in Uppsala County.

== Administration ==
The main aim of the County Administrative Board is to fulfill the goals set in national politics by the Riksdag and the Government, to coordinate the interests of the county, promote its development, establish regional goals and safeguard the due process of law in the handling of each case. The County Administrative Board is a Government Agency headed by a Governor. See List of Uppsala Governors.

== Politics ==
=== County Council ===
The County Council of Uppsala or Region Uppsala (previously Landstinget i Uppsala län), which is appointed by the electorate of the county, is primarily responsible for health care and public transportation.

The most recent county elections include:

- 2018 Uppsala regional election
- 2014 Uppsala county election
- 2010 Uppsala county election

=== General elections ===
The table details all Riksdag election (general election) results of Uppsala County since the unicameral era began in 1970. The blocs denote which party would support the Prime Minister or the lead opposition party towards the end of the elected parliament.

Year	Turnout	Votes	V	S	MP	C	L	KD	M	SD	NyD	Left	Right
1970	87.7	131,282	3.2	45.8		22.5	14.7	1.8	10.8			49.4	47.9
1973	90.3	139,874	5.5	43.0		26.9	9.5	1.5	12.9			48.4	49.3
1976	91.3	149,325	5.4	42.2		25.1	11.3	1.2	14.3			47.6	50.6
1979	90.7	153,866	6.6	42.3		19.9	10.7	1.1	18.8			48.9	49.3
1982	91.7	160,073	6.1	44.6	2.0	16.9	6.3	1.5	22.3			50.7	45.5
1985	90.2	162,979	5.6	43.3	1.7	12.7	15.4		20.5			48.9	48.6
1988	86.3	160,675	6.2	40.8	5.7	12.3	13.6	2.0	18.4			52.7	44.3
1991	87.0	167,283	4.5	35.3	4.3	9.0	11.2	5.8	22.0		7.5	39.8	48.1
1994	87.4	176,494	5.9	42.8	6.1	7.9	9.0	3.8	22.4		1.2	54.8	43.0
1998	81.9	170,096	10.9	34.4	5.7	5.8	6.2	10.7	23.8			51.0	46.5
2002	80.8	176,402	8.1	37.4	5.7	6.8	15.6	8.9	15.0	1.4		51.3	46.3
2006	82.9	196,389	5.7	30.9	6.3	9.9	9.1	6.6	26.5	2.3		42.9	52.1
2010	85.8	215,030	5.5	27.4	8.8	8.3	7.9	5.7	30.1	4.7		41.7	52.0
2014	87.4	228,351	6.3	28.9	8.4	6.9	6.2	4.7	22.4	10.5		43.5	40.6
2018	88.9	241,489	8.7	27.0	5.6	9.2	6.2	6.9	19.0	15.4		50.5	47.5
2022	86.0	251,301	7.9	29.1	6.7	7.3	5.0	5.9	18.3	18.2		51.0	47.4

== Municipalities ==
- Älvkarleby
- Tierp
- Östhammar
- Uppsala
- Enköping
- Håbo
- Knivsta
- Heby (from 2007-01-01)

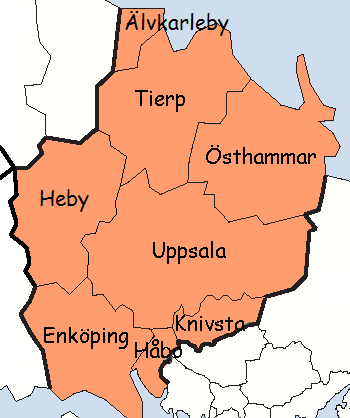
Map of Uppsala County

== Heraldry ==
The County of Uppsala inherited its coat of arms from the province of Uppland. When it is shown with a royal crown it represents the County Administrative Board.
