= 2010 Örebro county election =

Regional council election in Örebro County, Sweden

Örebro County held a county council election on 19 September 2010, on the same day as the general and municipal elections.

== Results ==
The number of seats remained at 71 with the Social Democrats winning the most at 31, the same number as in 2006. The party won 44.4% of a vote total of 178,506.

Party	Votes	%	Seats	±
Social Democrats	79,260	44.4	31	0
Moderates	37,148	20.8	15	+2
People's Party	11,669	6.5	5	0
Christian Democrats	11,227	6.3	4	-2
Left Party	11,110	6.2	4	-1
Green Party	9,461	5.3	4	+1
Centre Party	9,185	5.1	4	-1
Sweden Democrats	8,775	4.9	4	+1
Others	671	0.4	0	0
Invalid/blank votes	3,584			
Total	182,090	100	71	0
Source:val.se

=== Municipalities ===
Location	Turnout	Share	Votes	S	M	FP	KD	V	MP	C	SD	Other
Askersund	82.2	4.1	7,380	43.6	22.8	5.7	6.2	4.8	4.3	8.1	4.4	0.1
Degerfors	83.0	3.6	6,341	52.5	10.0	3.2	4.4	18.3	3.7	4.1	3.2	0.5
Hallsberg	83.2	5.5	9,804	50.1	17.4	4.8	5.2	5.8	4.1	6.5	6.0	0.1
Hällefors	78.1	2.5	4,454	54.5	15.2	2.9	2.4	9.0	3.6	7.5	4.9	0.1
Karlskoga	80.9	10.7	19,035	48.7	23.4	5.1	4.3	5.8	4.5	2.5	3.4	2.4
Kumla	83.2	7.1	12,673	48.0	18.9	7.0	6.8	4.1	4.0	5.6	5.6	0.0
Laxå	81.7	2.1	3,742	52.1	13.7	5.2	9.5	5.8	3.2	6.4	3.9	0.1
Lekeberg	84.8	2.6	4,614	35.8	20.5	4.7	9.6	4.1	5.1	13.6	6.5	0.1
Lindesberg	81.3	8.1	14,548	45.9	19.3	4.6	4.7	4.2	4.8	8.9	7.4	0.1
Ljusnarsberg	75.8	1.7	3,058	49.0	17.6	3.2	3.1	8.2	4.0	7.0	7.7	0.1
Nora	81.4	3.7	6,551	49.9	20.6	6.5	4.5	4.0	4.8	5.6	4.0	0.2
Örebro	83.4	48.3	86,306	40.5	22.5	8.1	7.3	6.4	6.4	4.0	4.7	0.1
Total	82.5	100.0	178,506	44.4	20.8	6.4	6.3	6.2	5.3	5.1	4.9	0.4
Source: val.se

== Images ==
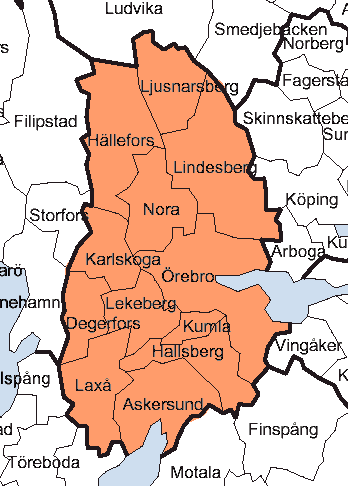
