= 2010 Södermanland county election =

Local election in Sweden

Södermanland County in Sweden held a county council election on 19 September 2010 across its nine municipalities. This was part of the 2010 Swedish local elections. It was held on the same day as the general and municipal elections.

== Results ==
The number of seats went up to 71, an addition of six. The Social Democrats won the most seats at 27, a drop of two from 2006.

Party	Votes	%	Seats	±
Social Democrats	62,257	37.7	27	-2
Moderates	40,764	24.6	18	+3
People's Party	12,391	7.5	5	0
Green Party	12,355	7.4	6	+3
Centre Party	9,633	5.8	4	-1
Sweden Democrats	9,379	5.6	4	+4
Left Party	9,271	5.6	4	0
Christian Democrats	7,809	4.7	3	-1
Others	1,854	1.1	0	0
Invalid/blank votes	5,972			
Total	171,946	100	71	+6
Source: val.se

== Municipal results ==
The nine municipalities were divided into four separate constituencies based on geography, in which Eskilstuna was a unitary constituency.

Location	Turnout	Share	Votes	S	M	FP	MP	C	SD	V	KD	Other
Eskilstuna	78.7	34.6	57,412	38.3	23.1	7.2	7.8	4.6	7.6	6.1	4.5	0.8
Flen	81.2	6.0	9,929	41.7	21.4	4.8	5.6	8.2	6.2	6.2	4.8	1.3
Gnesta	82.6	3.9	6,418	32.5	25.9	6.4	10.1	9.8	4.7	5.9	3.6	1.0
Katrineholm	81.7	12.1	20,021	42.0	18.6	10.0	7.6	6.7	4.5	4.5	4.1	1.9
Nyköping	83.2	19.6	32,495	38.1	24.8	7.3	7.9	6.1	4.2	5.3	5.2	1.2
Oxelösund	81.8	4.3	7,086	43.8	21.7	6.4	6.6	2.6	3.4	10.7	3.2	1.6
Strängnäs	81.7	11.9	19,732	30.2	31.7	8.5	6.5	6.9	5.0	4.5	5.8	0.7
Trosa	84.5	4.4	7,260	27.1	41.2	7.5	7.1	4.3	4.4	3.4	4.6	0.5
Vingåker	83.1	3.4	5,621	44.5	20.9	5.6	5.5	6.7	4.3	4.7	5.1	2.7
Total	81.1	100.0	165,974	37.7	24.6	7.5	7.4	5.8	5.6	5.6	4.7	1.1
Source: val.se
