= 2010 Jämtland county election =

2010 election in Sweden

Jämtland County held a county council election on 19 September 2010, on the same day as the general and municipal elections.

== Results ==
The number of seats remained at 55 with the Social Democrats winning the most at 24, a gain of two from 2006. The party received near 41% of a valid vote of 78,700.

Party	Votes	%	Seats	±
Social Democrats	32,237	41.0	24	+2
Moderates	15,307	19.4	11	0
Centre Party	12,667	16.1	9	-2
Left Party	5,414	6.9	4	-1
Green Party	4,722	6.0	4	+1
People's Party	3,358	4.3	3	0
Sweden Democrats	2,130	2.7	0	0
Christian Democrats	1,875	2.4	0	-2
Others	990	1.2	0	0
Invalid/blank votes	2,195			
Total	80,895	100	55	0
Source: val.se

== Municipalities ==
Location	Turnout	Share	Votes	S	M	C	V	MP	FP	SD	KD	Other
Berg	76.7	5.6	4,416	40.0	18.9	21.4	5.4	5.5	2.7	3.2	2.1	0.8
Bräcke	78.8	5.4	4,254	52.0	15.9	13.9	6.9	3.4	3.6	2.5	1.0	0.7
Härjedalen	77.2	8.2	6,470	45.9	18.2	9.6	6.2	2.9	5.1	5.4	2.6	4.0
Krokom	80.3	11.0	8,628	37.8	18.8	20.5	7.7	5.9	3.3	2.6	3.1	0.3
Ragunda	77.0	4.3	3,359	54.1	12.3	16.5	7.3	3.5	1.2	3.0	1.3	0.8
Strömsund	79.5	9.9	7,766	48.4	15.6	12.3	8.1	2.5	2.4	3.5	1.7	5.5
Åre	79.4	7.8	6,123	35.8	22.9	17.1	4.2	7.8	6.4	1.6	3.5	0.6
Östersund	80.8	47.9	37,684	37.8	21.1	16.4	7.1	7.6	4.9	2.2	2.4	0.4
Total	79.7	100.0	78,700	41.0	19.4	16.1	6.9	6.0	4.3	2.7	2.4	1.3
Source: val.se

== Images ==
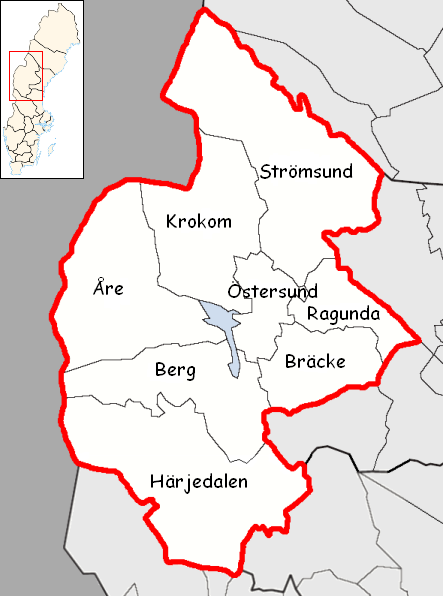
