= 2010 Halland county election =

Regional council election in Halland County, Sweden

Halland County held a county council election on 19 September 2010, on the same day as the general and municipal elections.

== Results ==
The number of seats remained at 71 with the Moderates supplanting the Social Democrats as the largest party with 24, an increase of four from in 2006. The party received 32.1% of a total valid vote of 189,909.

Party	Votes	%	Seats	±
Moderates	60,957	32.1	24	+4
Social Democrats	55,202	29.1	21	-2
Centre Party	18,576	9.8	7	-2
People's Party	15,290	8.1	6	0
Green Party	10,535	5.5	4	+1
Christian Democrats	8,334	4.4	3	-2
Sweden Democrats	8,179	4.3	3	+3
Left Party	6,946	3.7	3	0
Others	5,890	3.1	0	-2
Invalid/blank votes	4,308			
Total	194,271	100	71	0
Source:val.se

== Municipal results ==
Location	Turnout	Share	Votes	M	S	C	FP	MP	KD	SD	V	Other
Falkenberg	81.1	13.4	25,459	25.9	32.1	15.4	6.0	5.5	4.0	4.7	3.9	2.5
Halmstad	82.3	30.9	58,648	29.9	35.8	6.4	6.8	6.1	3.9	4.2	4.1	2.8
Hylte	77.0	3.1	5,943	22.3	37.7	14.7	8.0	3.2	3.8	4.6	2.9	2.7
Kungsbacka	86.5	25.1	47,712	42.1	17.2	7.6	11.9	5.8	5.5	3.6	2.4	3.9
Laholm	80.5	7.7	14,697	31.1	25.9	14.8	6.4	4.5	3.8	7.6	3.2	2.7
Varberg	84.0	19.7	37,450	28.9	31.5	11.2	7.1	5.2	4.3	3.8	4.8	3.2
Total	83.1	100.0	189,909	32.1	29.1	9.8	8.1	5.5	4.4	4.3	3.7	3.0
Source: val.se

== Images ==
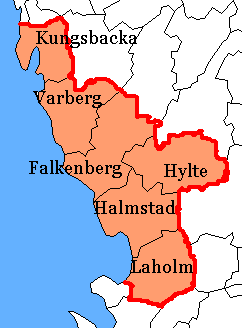
