= Vård för pengarna =

Vård för Pengarna
- Abbreviation: VåfP
- Chairperson: Jonas Lindeberg
- Founded: 2013
- Ideology: Single-issue politics
- Södermanland Regional Council (2022): 10 / 79

Vård för Pengarna (lit. 'Healthcare for the money') is a Swedish regional political party in Södermanland County which is the fourth-largest party in the Regional Council, holding 10 out of 79 seats. Since 2018, the party has been a part of the incumbent regional government coalition together with the Social Democrats and the Centre Party. Following the 2022 election, in which the party lost five seats, it formed a minority coalition together with the right-wing Moderate, Centre and Christian Democratic parties. Together, they hold 34 of the regional council assembly's 79 seats.

== History ==
The party was founded in the autumn of 2013 by staff working at Nyköping Hospital. The main idea of the party is that more of the regional tax revenue should go to health care, while less money should be spent on political leadership and administration.

Jonas Lindeberg is the party chairman.
