= Knivsta Municipality =

Knivsta Municipality Knivsta kommun
- Municipality
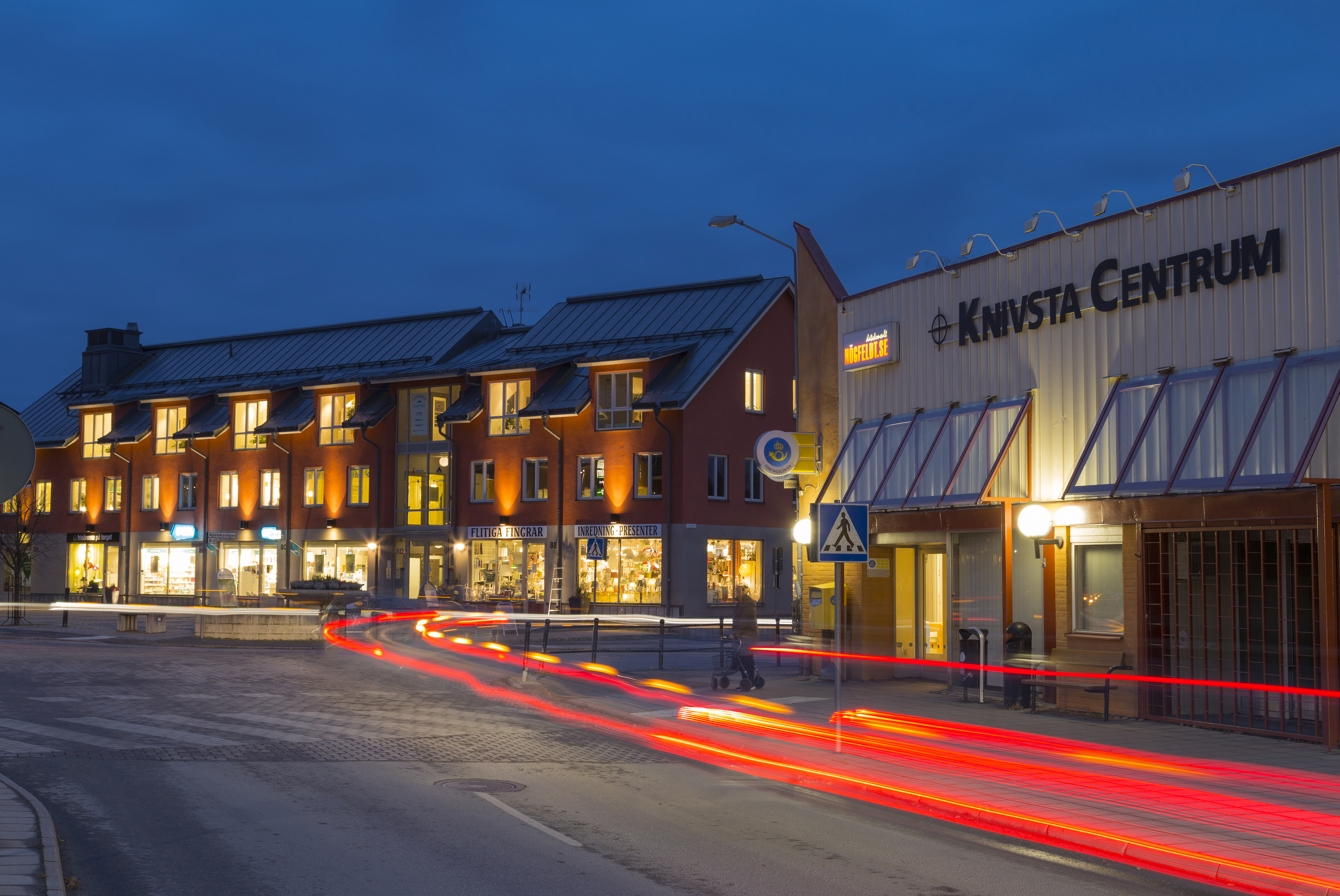

- Flag Coat of arms

- Coordinates: 59°43′N 17°48′E
- Country: Sweden
- County: Uppsala County
- Seat: Knivsta

Area
  - Total: 295.12 km^{2} (113.95 sq mi)
  - Land: 282.17 km^{2} (108.95 sq mi)
  - Water: 12.95 km^{2} (5.00 sq mi)
- Area as of 1 January 2014.

Population (30 June 2025)
  - Total: 21,402
  - Density: 75.848/km^{2} (196.45/sq mi)
- Time zone: UTC+1 (CET)
  - Summer (DST): UTC+2 (CEST)
- ISO 3166 code: SE
- Province: Uppland
- Municipal code: 0330
- Website: www.knivsta.se

Knivsta Municipality (Swedish: Knivsta kommun) is a municipality in Uppsala County in east central Sweden. Its seat is located in the town of Knivsta, with some 7,100 inhabitants. It is known for being one of the safest municipalities in Sweden, consistently ranking among the top 5 safest (out of 290) for more than a decade.

== History ==
Until 1971 Knivsta was a municipality in Stockholm County, when it was merged into Uppsala Municipality and subsequently belonged to Uppsala County. On January 1, 2003 Knivsta was separated from Uppsala to once again form a separate municipality, located in Uppsala County.

The coat of arms symbolises the Stones of Mora where the Swedish Kings were elected in ancient times.

== Localities ==
- Alsike
- Knivsta (seat)

== Lakes ==
- Edasjön

== Demographics ==
This is a demographic table based on Knivsta Municipality's electoral districts in the 2022 Swedish general election sourced from SVT's election platform, in turn taken from SCB official statistics.

In total there were 19,795 residents, including 13,626 Swedish citizens of voting age. 43.7% voted for the left coalition and 54.7% for the right coalition. Indicators are in percentage points except population totals and income.

Location	Residents	Citizen adults	Left vote	Right vote	Employed	Swedish parents	Foreign heritage	Income SEK	Degree
Location			%	%					
Boängen	1,701	1,005	38.5	60.8	92	83	17	39,390	63
Gredelby	1,496	1,172	54.0	44.9	85	82	18	29,550	59
Husby-Långhundra	1,182	901	32.7	65.8	86	88	12	28,635	28
Lagga-Östuna	1,868	1,368	37.8	61.5	89	87	13	32,058	44
Norra Alsike	1,626	1,047	42.1	56.3	89	79	21	31,826	51
Sågen	1,420	978	44.3	51.9	81	65	35	26,913	54
Södra Knivsta	1,925	1,381	45.1	53.1	81	75	25	27,612	47
Tallbacken	1,501	999	48.2	49.5	74	65	35	24,083	42
Vassunda	1,505	1,091	40.5	57.9	88	86	14	32,199	52
Vrå	2,019	1,186	37.0	62.0	91	81	19	38,231	65
Västra Knivsta	1,726	1,215	54.8	43.3	87	86	14	32,370	61
Östra Knivsta	1,826	1,283	48.2	50.4	90	88	12	35,963	63
Source: SVT

== Elections ==
These are the election results since the refounding of the municipality from the 2002 election.

=== Riksdag ===
Year	Turnout	Votes	V	S	MP	C	L	KD	M	SD
2002	82.9	7,158	5.4	31.8	5.0	6.7	17.8	10.5	20.0	1.6
2006	85.9	7,915	3.6	24.3	5.5	10.1	9.9	8.0	34.0	2.6
2010	88.3	8,981	3.5	19.2	7.4	9.2	9.5	7.1	38.3	4.4
2014	89.0	9,716	3.9	21.7	8.0	8.0	6.5	6.7	30.6	10.8

Blocs

This lists the relative strength of the socialist and centre-right blocs since 1973, but parties not elected to the Riksdag are inserted as "other", including the Sweden Democrats results from 2002 to 2006. The coalition or government mandate marked in bold formed the government after the election.

Year	Turnout	Votes	Left	Right	SD	Other	Elected
2002	82.9	7,158	**42.2**	55.0	0.0	2.8	97.2
2006	85.9	7,915	33.4	**62.0**	0.0	4.6	95.4
2010	88.3	8,981	30.1	**64.1**	4.4	1.4	98.6
2014	89.0	9,716	**33.6**	51.8	10.8	3.8	96.2
