= Health Care Party =

Swedish political party

Sjukvårdspartiet
- Leader: Kenneth Backgård
- Ideology: Single-issue party (healthcare)
- European affiliation: European Alliance for Freedom and Democracy (2020–2023)
- Riksdag: 0 / 349
- European Parliament: 0 / 20
- Regional council seats: 51 / 1,597
- Municipal council seats: 34 / 12,700

Website
- sjukvardspartiet.nu

The Health Care Party (Swedish: Sjukvårdspartiet, SVP) is a political party in Sweden with a focus on healthcare issues. It regards itself as cross-political single-issue party.

The main party is based in Norrbotten, with affiliated regional parties in the counties of Dalarna, Gävleborg, Värmland and Västernorrland.

Health Care Parties hold 51 seats in Sweden's regional councils; 27 in Norrbotten, 7 in Västernorrland, 6 in Dalarna, 6 in Värmland, 5 in Gävleborg, They also control 34 council seats in the municipalities of Boden, Bollnäs, Gällivare, Kiruna, Luleå, Pajala, Piteå, Säffle, Älvsbyn and Övertorneå. The Health Care Party participated in elections to the Riksdag in 2006, 2010 and 2014 with limited success, gaining at most 11,519 votes in 2006 and just 11 votes in 2014.

The six regional parties founded the national party at a conference in Uppsala in 2005. Notably some other regional health care parties have stayed away from the project, such as the health care parties in Värmland, Västra Götaland and Jämtland.

== Policy ==
The party wants to invest 35 billion Swedish kronor more in healthcare with the aim of spending 10% of Sweden's gross national product on healthcare. The party also wants more private involvement in the state healthcare system and wants to reduce the overall rate of tax.

== See also ==
- Social welfare in Sweden
