= 2014 Swedish local elections =

Local elections were held in Sweden on 14 September 2014 to elect county councils and municipal councils. The elections were held alongside general elections.

== Results ==
=== County councils ===
The total number of seats increased nationwide to 1,678, up from 1,662 in the 2010 elections.

Party	Votes	%	Seats	+/–
Swedish Social Democratic Party	2,020,476	32.90	603	–6
Moderate Party	1,321,172	21.51	339	–79
Sweden Democrats	561,611	9.14	161	+93
Green Party	442,760	7.21	106	+3
Left Party	434,992	7.08	121	+23
Centre Party	387,555	6.31	125	+4
Liberal People's Party	385,999	6.28	96	–21
Christian Democrats	317,270	5.17	85	+3
Feminist Initiative	66,600	1.08	0	0
Norrbottens Health Care Party	41,702	0.68	19	+6
Pirate Party	21,322	0.35	0	0
Vård för pengarna	20,243	0.33	8	+8
Vårdpartiet i Skåne	16,285	0.27	0	0
Gävleborg Health Care Party	14,327	0.23	6	+2
Vägvalet	11,453	0.19	0	0
Health Care Party in Värmland	11,381	0.19	5	0
Swedish Senior Citizen Interest Party	9,849	0.16	0	0
Dalarnas Health Care Party	8,265	0.13	4	+1
Västra Götaland Health Care Party	7,006	0.11	0	0
Other parties	41,717	0.68	0	–14
Total	6,141,985	100.00	1,678	+16
Valid votes	6,141,985	98.33		
Invalid/blank votes	104,605	1.67		
Total votes	6,246,590	100.00		

=== Municipal elections ===
Party	Votes	%	Seats	+/–
Swedish Social Democratic Party	1,947,473	31.23	4,364	−229
Moderate Party	1,343,586	21.55	2,435	−561
Centre Party	489,381	7.85	1,411	+12
Sweden Democrats	581,476	9.33	1,324	+712
Left Party	401,531	6.44	750	+47
Green Party	483,529	7.76	732	+46
Liberal People's Party	408,175	6.55	710	−204
Christian Democrats	248,070	3.98	515	−76
Feminist Initiative	76,646	1.23	26	+22
Other parties	255,143	4.09	513	−1
Total	6,235,010	100.00	12,780	–208
Valid votes	6,235,010	98.73		
Invalid/blank votes	80,380	1.27		
Total votes	6,315,390	100.00		
