= Västernorrland County (Riksdag constituency) =

Constituency of the Riksdag, the national legislature of Sweden

- Västernorrlands Län
- Constituency for the Riksdag
- Location of Västernorrland County within Sweden
- County: Västernorrland
- Population: 240,641 (2025)
- Electorate: 189,562 (2026)
- Area: 23,089 km^{2} (2026)

Current constituency
- Created: 1970
- Seats: List (Note: Constituency seats only.): 7 (2026–present); 8 (2010–2026); 9 (1998–2010); 10 (1979–1998); 11 (1970–1979)
- Member of the Riksdag: List: Jörgen Berglund (M); Peter Hedberg (S); Mats Hellhoff (SD); Malin Larsson (S); Liza-Maria Norlin (KD); Kevin Sahlin (SD); Anne-Li Sjölund (C); Anna-Belle Strömberg (S)
- Created from: Västernorrland County

Västernorrland County (Swedish: Västernorrlands Län) is one of the 29 multi-member constituencies of the Riksdag, the national legislature of Sweden. The constituency was established in 1970 when the Riksdag changed from a bicameral legislature to a unicameral legislature. It is conterminous with the county of Västernorrland. The constituency currently elects seven of the 349 members of the Riksdag using the open party-list proportional representation electoral system. At the 2026 general election it had 189,562 registered electors.

== Electoral system ==
Västernorrland County currently elects seven of the 349 members of the Riksdag using the open party-list proportional representation electoral system. Constituency seats are allocated using the modified Sainte-Laguë method. Only parties that reach the 4% national threshold and parties that receive at least 12% of the vote in the constituency compete for constituency seats. Supplementary levelling seats may also be allocated at the constituency level to parties that reach the 4% national threshold.

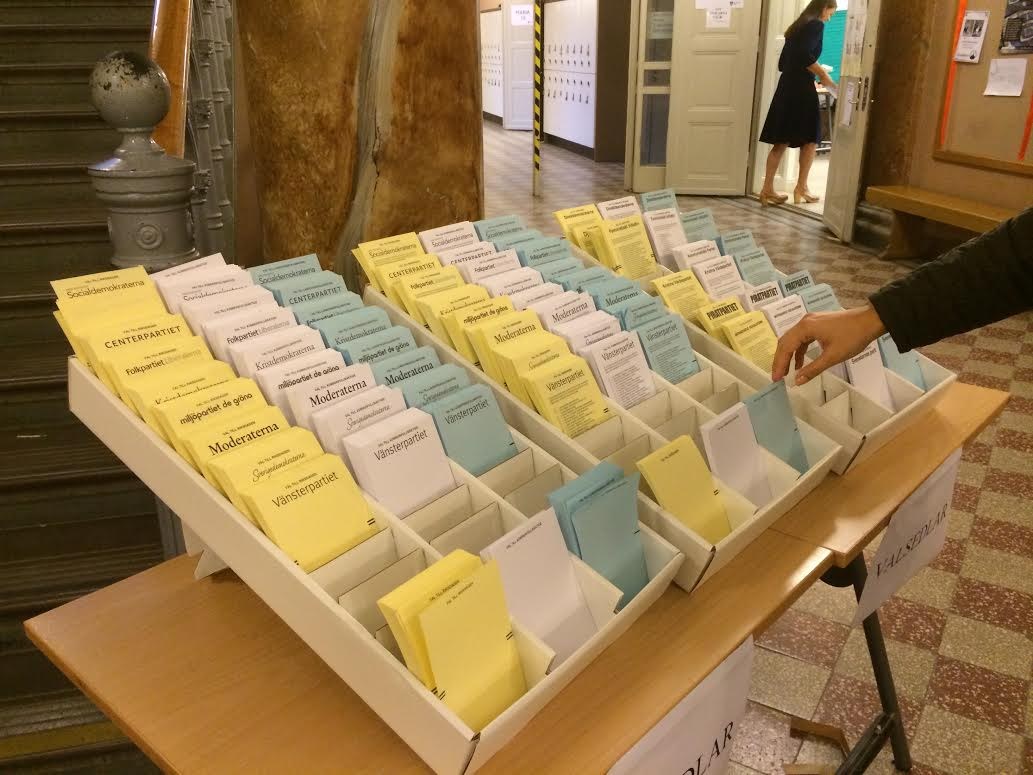
A selection of ballot papers available for voters at the 2014 general election in Stockholm - yellow for the Riksdag, blue for the regional council and white for the municipal council

Prior to 1997 voters could cast any ballot paper they wanted, though it had to contain the name of a party and the name of at least one candidate nominated by that party in the constituency. It was common for parties to hand out ballot papers with their name and list of candidates at the entrance of polling stations. Voters could delete the names of candidates or write-in the names of other candidates but in practice these options weren't used enough by voters to have any significant impact on the results and consequently elections operated as a closed system.

Since 1997, elections in Sweden follow the French model in having separate ballot papers for each party/list in a constituency. There are two ballot papers for each party - a party ballot paper (partivalsedel) with just the name of the party and a name ballot paper (namnvalsedel) with the name of the party and its list of candidates. There are also blank ballot papers (blank valsedel). Voters can initially pick as many ballot papers as they wish and then, in the secrecy of the voting booth, they select a single ballot paper of their choice. If they chose a name ballot paper they have the option of casting a preferential vote for one of their chosen party's candidates. If they chose a blank ballot paper they can write the name of any party including unregistered parties and, optionally, they can write the name of any person as their preferred candidate, even one that does not belong to their chosen party. They then place their chosen ballot paper in an envelope which is placed in the ballot box, discarding all other ballot papers they picked.

Seats won by each party/list in a constituency are allocated to its candidates in order of preference votes (a personal mandate), provided that the candidate has received at least 8% of votes cast for their party in the constituency (5% since January 2011). Any unfilled seats are then allocated to the party's remaining candidates in the order they appear on the party list (a party mandate).

== Election results ==
=== Summary ===
Election	Left V / VPK			Social Democrats S			Greens MP			Centre C			Liberals L / FP / F			Moderates M			Christian Democrats KD / KDS			Sweden Democrats SD		
Election	Votes	%	Seats	Votes	%	Seats	Votes	%	Seats	Votes	%	Seats	Votes	%	Seats	Votes	%	Seats	Votes	%	Seats	Votes	%	Seats
2026	10,072	6.34%	0	54,658	34.38%	3	7,315	4.60%	0	10,988	6.91%	0	5,868	3.69%	0	25,812	16.24%	1	11,156	7.02%	1	30,481	19.17%	2
2022	9,123	5.75%	0	62,562	39.42%	4	5,437	3.43%	0	11,822	7.45%	1	4,348	2.74%	0	22,176	13.97%	1	8,591	5.41%	0	32,829	20.68%	2
2018	13,335	8.18%	1	64,882	39.80%	4	4,366	2.68%	0	16,108	9.88%	1	5,601	3.44%	0	22,255	13.65%	1	8,816	5.41%	0	25,360	15.56%	1
2014	9,211	5.68%	0	74,977	46.25%	5	7,073	4.36%	0	10,922	6.74%	0	5,440	3.36%	0	25,833	15.94%	2	6,097	3.76%	0	17,569	10.84%	1
2010	9,642	6.03%	0	70,341	43.97%	5	8,757	5.47%	0	11,185	6.99%	1	8,253	5.16%	0	34,550	21.60%	2	6,983	4.37%	0	7,264	4.54%	0
2006	10,229	6.67%	1	70,515	45.96%	5	5,871	3.83%	0	16,197	10.56%	1	8,288	5.40%	0	26,319	17.16%	2	8,674	5.65%	0	3,400	2.22%	0
2002	14,902	9.87%	1	74,486	49.34%	5	5,672	3.76%	0	14,566	9.65%	1	13,974	9.26%	1	12,842	8.51%	1	11,450	7.58%	0	1,269	0.84%	0
1998	23,304	14.76%	2	71,257	45.13%	5	6,415	4.06%	0	10,491	6.64%	0	5,678	3.60%	0	21,616	13.69%	1	16,072	10.18%	1			
1994	11,666	6.74%	1	95,266	55.00%	6	8,392	4.84%	0	15,913	9.19%	1	10,432	6.02%	0	22,535	13.01%	2	6,686	3.86%	0			
1991	8,781	5.06%	0	83,224	47.95%	6	5,346	3.08%	0	19,612	11.30%	1	12,741	7.34%	1	22,543	12.99%	1	12,287	7.08%	1			
1988	10,377	5.98%	0	89,625	51.64%	6	8,862	5.11%	0	25,861	14.90%	2	15,355	8.85%	1	16,242	9.36%	1	6,240	3.60%	0			
1985	9,811	5.36%	0	97,384	53.21%	6	2,401	1.31%	0	32,140	17.56%	2	18,306	10.00%	1	22,416	12.25%	1	with C					
1982	9,843	5.29%	0	99,968	53.69%	6	2,582	1.39%	0	38,992	20.94%	3	6,997	3.76%	0	23,109	12.41%	1	4,247	2.28%	0			
1979	10,042	5.40%	0	95,156	51.22%	5				43,892	23.62%	3	12,120	6.52%	1	19,994	10.76%	1	3,262	1.76%	0			
1976	9,359	5.02%	0	93,935	50.37%	6				53,048	28.44%	3	12,661	6.79%	1	13,586	7.28%	1	3,277	1.76%	0			
1973	11,346	6.35%	1	90,613	50.68%	6				49,518	27.70%	3	10,101	5.65%	0	12,037	6.73%	1	4,227	2.36%	0			
1970	11,693	6.58%	1	92,790	52.24%	6				40,922	23.04%	3	16,846	9.48%	1	10,432	5.87%	0	4,486	2.53%	0			

(Excludes levelling seats. Figures in italics represent alliances/joint lists.)

=== Detailed ===
Party has received at least 4% of the vote nationally and is entitled to compete for constituency seats.

==== 2020s ====
===== 2026 =====
Results of the 2026 general election held on 13 September 2026:

Party		Votes per municipality							Total votes	%	Seats		
Party		Ånge	Härnö- sand	Kram- fors	Örns- köldsvik	Sollef- teå	Sunds- vall	Timrå	Total votes	%	Con.	Lev.	Tot.
Swedish Social Democratic Party	S	1,923	5,536	3,810	13,442	3,552	22,242	4,153	54,658	34.38%	3	0	3
Sweden Democrats	SD	1,530	2,825	2,421	6,085	2,853	11,932	2,835	30,481	19.17%	2	0	2
Moderate Party	M	830	2,333	1,281	6,465	1,104	12,044	1,755	25,812	16.24%	1	0	1
Christian Democrats	KD	463	842	696	2,915	1,272	4,180	788	11,156	7.02%	1	0	1
Centre Party	C	323	1,067	918	2,957	1,017	4,156	550	10,988	6.91%	0	1	1
Left Party	V	303	1,173	839	1,831	894	4,429	603	10,072	6.34%	0	0	0
Green Party	MP	138	1,339	487	1,375	420	3,229	327	7,315	4.60%	0	0	0
Liberals	L	179	568	357	1,257	261	2,862	384	5,868	3.69%	0	0	0
Örebro Party	ÖP	35	97	97	226	100	298	111	964	0.61%	0	0	0
Alternative for Sweden	AfS	31	65	70	120	67	240	51	644	0.41%	0	0	0
Christian Values Party	KrVP	2	24	42	156	18	75	13	330	0.21%	0	0	0
Ambition Sweden	AS	24	9	18	40	14	84	19	208	0.13%	0	0	0
Pirate Party	PP	8	17	30	27	10	66	6	164	0.10%	0	0	0
Citizens' Coalition	MED	1	9	4	12	1	48	9	84	0.05%	0	0	0
Independent Rural Party	LPo	0	6	2	8	51	3	2	72	0.05%	0	0	0
Human Rights and Democracy	MoD	0	5	3	16	6	34	1	65	0.04%	0	0	0
Direct Democrats	DD	0	0	2	2	1	15	3	23	0.01%	0	0	0
United Voice	ER	4	2	2	3	4	5	1	21	0.01%	0	0	0
Nordic Resistance Movement	NMR	0	1	1	4	0	6	1	13	0.01%	0	0	0
Communist Party of Sweden	SKP	0	1	3	2	1	0	5	12	0.01%	0	0	0
Communist Party	K	0	0	2	0	1	3	0	6	0.00%	0	0	0
Donald Duck Party		1	1	0	0	2	0	1	5	0.00%	0	0	0
Unity	ENH	0	0	0	1	2	1	1	5	0.00%	0	0	0
Volt Sweden	Volt	0	0	0	1	0	3	0	4	0.00%	0	0	0
The Push Buttons	Kn	1	0	1	0	0	1	0	3	0.00%	0	0	0
Classical Liberal Party	KLP	0	0	0	0	0	2	0	2	0.00%	0	0	0
Nuance Party	PNy	0	0	0	1	0	1	0	2	0.00%	0	0	0
RegleraAI.nu		0	1	0	0	0	1	0	2	0.00%	0	0	0
99 Black Balloons		0	0	0	0	0	1	0	1	0.00%	0	0	0
Evil Chicken Party	OKP	0	0	0	0	0	1	0	1	0.00%	0	0	0
Freedom of the Family		1	0	0	0	0	0	0	1	0.00%	0	0	0
Pax		0	0	0	0	0	1	0	1	0.00%	0	0	0
Social Liberals		0	0	0	0	0	1	0	1	0.00%	0	0	0
United Sweden		0	0	0	0	0	1	0	1	0.00%	0	0	0
Valid votes		5,797	15,921	11,086	36,946	11,651	65,965	11,619	158,985	100.00%	7	1	8
Blank votes		79	150	154	360	167	576	131	1,617	1.01%			
Rejected votes – unregistered parties		3	8	9	15	5	26	4	70	0.04%			
Rejected votes – other		7	20	23	32	8	69	10	169	0.11%			
Total polled		5,886	16,099	11,272	37,353	11,831	66,636	11,764	160,841	84.85%			
Registered electors		7,182	18,996	13,671	43,552	14,136	78,156	13,869	189,562				
Turnout		81.95%	84.75%	82.45%	85.77%	83.69%	85.26%	84.82%	84.85%				

The following candidates were elected:

- Constituency seats (personal mandates) - Jörgen Berglund (M), 1,362 votes;
- Constituency seats (party mandates) - Angelika Bengtsson (SD), 5 votes; Peter Hedberg (S), 625 votes; Malin Larsson (S), 1,996 votes; Liza-Maria Norlin (KD), 374 votes; Kevin Sahlin (SD), 236 votes; and Anna-Belle Strömberg (S), 776 votes.
- Levelling seats (personal mandates) - Anne-Li Sjölund (C), 681 votes.

===== 2022 =====
Results of the 2022 general election held on 11 September 2022:

Party		Votes per municipality							Total votes	%	Seats		
Party		Ånge	Härnö- sand	Kram- fors	Örns- köldsvik	Sollef- teå	Sunds- vall	Timrå	Total votes	%	Con.	Lev.	Tot.
Swedish Social Democratic Party	S	2,265	6,318	4,807	15,160	4,681	24,488	4,843	62,562	39.42%	4	0	4
Sweden Democrats	SD	1,816	3,144	2,529	6,246	3,007	12,984	3,103	32,829	20.68%	2	0	2
Moderate Party	M	751	1,957	1,099	5,195	889	10,795	1,490	22,176	13.97%	1	0	1
Centre Party	C	335	1,214	962	3,543	1,056	4,122	590	11,822	7.45%	1	0	1
Left Party	V	292	1,017	917	1,635	996	3,662	604	9,123	5.75%	0	1	1
Christian Democrats	KD	367	743	536	2,437	719	3,212	577	8,591	5.41%	0	0	0
Green Party	MP	91	953	357	1,052	276	2,463	245	5,437	3.43%	0	0	0
Liberals	L	106	408	182	859	179	2,358	256	4,348	2.74%	0	0	0
Alternative for Sweden	AfS	25	43	42	121	39	195	23	488	0.31%	0	0	0
Citizens' Coalition	MED	2	15	18	50	5	126	12	228	0.14%	0	0	0
Pirate Party	PP	1	32	22	49	9	71	8	192	0.12%	0	0	0
The Push Buttons	Kn	13	17	24	31	20	48	18	171	0.11%	0	0	0
Human Rights and Democracy	MoD	3	6	8	65	9	40	21	152	0.10%	0	0	0
Christian Values Party	KrVP	1	21	25	46	17	36	2	148	0.09%	0	0	0
Independent Rural Party	LPo	11	17	7	30	44	24	1	134	0.08%	0	0	0
Nuance Party	PNy	2	18	1	11	5	47	3	87	0.05%	0	0	0
Feminist Initiative	FI	2	7	5	14	4	15	3	50	0.03%	0	0	0
Nordic Resistance Movement	NMR	3	2	2	13	4	17	3	44	0.03%	0	0	0
Direct Democrats	DD	1	5	3	5	2	22	4	42	0.03%	0	0	0
Unity	ENH	0	1	2	7	9	12	0	31	0.02%	0	0	0
Socialist Welfare Party	S-V	0	1	0	1	0	15	0	17	0.01%	0	0	0
Climate Alliance	KA	0	3	0	0	1	7	1	12	0.01%	0	0	0
Communist Party of Sweden	SKP	0	7	2	1	1	1	0	12	0.01%	0	0	0
Basic Income Party	BASIP	0	0	0	0	3	2	0	5	0.00%	0	0	0
Donald Duck Party		0	0	0	1	1	1	2	5	0.00%	0	0	0
Classical Liberal Party	KLP	1	1	0	0	0	2	0	4	0.00%	0	0	0
Turning Point Party	PV	0	0	0	0	2	0	1	3	0.00%	0	0	0
Freedom Party		2	0	0	0	0	0	0	2	0.00%	0	0	0
Change Party Revolution		0	0	0	0	1	0	0	1	0.00%	0	0	0
Green Democrats		0	0	0	0	0	1	0	1	0.00%	0	0	0
Hard Line Sweden		0	0	0	0	0	1	0	1	0.00%	0	0	0
New Social Party		0	0	0	0	0	1	0	1	0.00%	0	0	0
Now That Will Be Enough		0	0	0	0	0	1	0	1	0.00%	0	0	0
Volt Sweden	Volt	0	0	0	0	0	1	0	1	0.00%	0	0	0
Valid votes		6,090	15,950	11,550	36,572	11,979	64,770	11,810	158,721	100.00%	8	1	9
Blank votes		61	164	165	356	184	632	92	1,654	1.03%			
Rejected votes – unregistered parties		3	1	5	9	0	20	3	41	0.03%			
Rejected votes – other		6	10	9	23	14	66	14	142	0.09%			
Total polled		6,160	16,125	11,729	36,960	12,177	65,488	11,919	160,558	85.16%			
Registered electors		7,292	19,103	14,021	43,029	14,489	76,665	13,943	188,542				
Turnout		84.48%	84.41%	83.65%	85.90%	84.04%	85.42%	85.48%	85.16%				

The following candidates were elected:

- Constituency seats (party mandates) - Jörgen Berglund (M), 1,012 votes; Peder Björk (S), 1,303 votes; Peter Hedberg (S), 681 votes; David Lång (SD), 1 vote; Malin Larsson (S), 2,089 votes; Ulf Lindholm (SD), 10 votes; Anne-Li Sjölund (C), 509 votes; and Anna-Belle Strömberg (S), 1,070 votes.
- Levelling seats (personal mandates) - Isabell Mixter (V), 561 votes.

Permanent substitutions:

- David Lång (SD) resigned on 19 June 2024 and was replaced by Mats Hellhoff (SD) on 20 June 2024.

==== 2010s ====
===== 2018 =====
Results of the 2018 general election held on 9 September 2018:

Party		Votes per municipality							Total votes	%	Seats		
Party		Ånge	Härnö- sand	Kram- fors	Örns- köldsvik	Sollef- teå	Sunds- vall	Timrå	Total votes	%	Con.	Lev.	Tot.
Swedish Social Democratic Party	S	2,630	5,971	4,955	16,850	4,453	24,834	5,189	64,882	39.80%	4	0	4
Sweden Democrats	SD	1,390	2,743	1,902	4,328	2,357	10,305	2,335	25,360	15.56%	1	0	1
Moderate Party	M	707	2,131	1,124	4,814	1,132	10,914	1,433	22,255	13.65%	1	0	1
Centre Party	C	537	1,618	1,503	4,562	1,622	5,448	818	16,108	9.88%	1	0	1
Left Party	V	429	1,443	1,423	2,233	1,933	4,915	959	13,335	8.18%	1	0	1
Christian Democrats	KD	306	862	480	2,716	550	3,305	597	8,816	5.41%	0	0	0
Liberals	L	100	522	247	1,016	202	3,146	368	5,601	3.44%	0	0	0
Green Party	MP	68	702	226	838	190	2,118	224	4,366	2.68%	0	0	0
Feminist Initiative	FI	18	143	61	69	57	314	26	688	0.42%	0	0	0
Alternative for Sweden	AfS	23	49	48	119	50	184	32	505	0.31%	0	0	0
Independent Rural Party	LPo	43	21	22	65	39	74	9	273	0.17%	0	0	0
Citizens' Coalition	MED	4	16	9	39	5	107	18	198	0.12%	0	0	0
Unity	ENH	2	11	11	19	15	59	6	123	0.08%	0	0	0
Direct Democrats	DD	4	13	1	27	5	65	3	118	0.07%	0	0	0
Pirate Party	PP	6	16	8	28	7	48	4	117	0.07%	0	0	0
Nordic Resistance Movement	NMR	8	6	5	9	2	36	2	68	0.04%	0	0	0
Christian Values Party	KrVP	1	4	11	27	7	11	1	62	0.04%	0	0	0
Norrland Party	NORRP	1	4	26	2	0	3	0	36	0.02%	0	0	0
Classical Liberal Party	KLP	2	1	0	8	1	16	7	35	0.02%	0	0	0
Animal Party	DjuP	1	0	2	3	2	8	0	16	0.01%	0	0	0
Communist Party of Sweden	SKP	0	4	0	2	1	1	1	9	0.01%	0	0	0
Initiative	INI	0	2	0	2	0	4	0	8	0.00%	0	0	0
Basic Income Party	BASIP	0	0	1	1	1	3	0	6	0.00%	0	0	0
European Workers Party	EAP	0	1	0	0	0	0	0	1	0.00%	0	0	0
Parties not on the ballot		0	1	1	9	0	4	0	15	0.01%	0	0	0
Valid votes		6,280	16,284	12,066	37,786	12,631	65,922	12,032	163,001	100.00%	8	0	8
Blank votes		68	142	124	346	123	493	93	1,389	0.84%			
Rejected votes – unregistered parties		1	2	4	14	21	26	1	69	0.04%			
Rejected votes – other		3	10	7	18	3	38	11	90	0.05%			
Total polled		6,352	16,438	12,201	38,164	12,778	66,479	12,137	164,549	87.76%			
Registered electors		7,417	18,829	14,153	43,087	14,780	75,358	13,876	187,500				
Turnout		85.64%	87.30%	86.21%	88.57%	86.45%	88.22%	87.47%	87.76%				

The following candidates were elected:

- Constituency seats (personal mandates) - Jörgen Berglund (M), 1,285 votes; Emil Källström (C), 2,136 votes; and Stefan Löfven (S), 10,235 votes.
- Constituency seats (party mandates) - Christina Höj Larsen (V), 605 votes; Malin Larsson (S), 606 votes; Ingemar Nilsson (S), 187 votes; Kristina Nilsson (S), 413 votes; and Johnny Skalin (SD), 104 votes.

Permanent substitutions:

- Ingemar Nilsson (S) resigned on 31 August 2021 and was replaced by Jasenko Omanović (S) on 1 September 2021.
- Emil Källström (C) resigned on 13 September 2021 and was replaced by Anne-Li Sjölund (C) on 14 September 2021.
- Stefan Löfven (S) resigned on 16 November 2021 and was replaced by Anna-Belle Strömberg (S) on the same day.

===== 2014 =====
Results of the 2014 general election held on 14 September 2014:

Party		Votes per municipality							Total votes	%	Seats		
Party		Ånge	Härnö- sand	Kram- fors	Örns- köldsvik	Sollef- teå	Sunds- vall	Timrå	Total votes	%	Con.	Lev.	Tot.
Swedish Social Democratic Party	S	3,214	7,063	6,447	18,661	7,037	26,618	5,937	74,977	46.25%	5	0	5
Moderate Party	M	735	2,530	1,410	5,559	1,377	12,690	1,532	25,833	15.94%	2	0	2
Sweden Democrats	SD	1,044	1,799	1,209	2,618	1,681	7,579	1,639	17,569	10.84%	1	0	1
Centre Party	C	483	1,055	1,188	3,377	857	3,393	569	10,922	6.74%	0	1	1
Left Party	V	372	1,042	930	1,602	865	3,611	789	9,211	5.68%	0	1	1
Green Party	MP	126	1,136	413	1,325	402	3,317	354	7,073	4.36%	0	0	0
Christian Democrats	KD	174	545	298	2,318	267	2,183	312	6,097	3.76%	0	0	0
Liberal People's Party	FP	94	538	208	1,030	270	2,892	408	5,440	3.36%	0	0	0
Feminist Initiative	FI	100	494	271	602	235	1,689	184	3,575	2.21%	0	0	0
Pirate Party	PP	38	96	40	125	33	311	30	673	0.42%	0	0	0
Unity	ENH	1	17	7	24	35	81	10	175	0.11%	0	0	0
Independent Rural Party	LPo	72	3	5	9	34	40	6	169	0.10%	0	0	0
Party of the Swedes	SVP	8	7	9	10	0	56	7	97	0.06%	0	0	0
Swedish Senior Citizen Interest Party	SPI	0	0	0	86	1	0	0	87	0.05%	0	0	0
Animal Party	DjuP	1	3	4	7	2	19	10	46	0.03%	0	0	0
Christian Values Party	KrVP	0	7	6	14	4	8	1	40	0.02%	0	0	0
Socialist Justice Party	RS	0	0	0	0	0	24	1	25	0.02%	0	0	0
Direct Democrats	DD	2	0	1	2	0	13	6	24	0.01%	0	0	0
Classical Liberal Party	KLP	0	0	0	1	2	8	1	12	0.01%	0	0	0
Communist Party of Sweden	SKP	0	0	0	5	0	2	0	7	0.00%	0	0	0
Health Party		0	0	0	2	0	0	0	2	0.00%	0	0	0
Freedom of the Justice Party	S-FRP	0	0	0	0	0	1	0	1	0.00%	0	0	0
Parties not on the ballot		0	3	2	17	6	21	8	57	0.04%	0	0	0
Valid votes		6,464	16,338	12,448	37,394	13,108	64,556	11,804	162,112	100.00%	8	2	10
Blank votes		52	102	86	379	117	460	80	1,276	0.78%			
Rejected votes – other		2	6	7	20	6	20	5	66	0.04%			
Total polled		6,518	16,446	12,541	37,793	13,231	65,036	11,889	163,454	86.10%			
Registered electors		7,708	19,254	14,745	43,558	15,512	75,252	13,813	189,842				
Turnout		84.56%	85.42%	85.05%	86.76%	85.30%	86.42%	86.07%	86.10%				

The following candidates were elected:

- Constituency seats (party mandates) - Lena Asplund (M), 1,049 votes; Mattias Bäckström Johansson (SD), 0 votes; Susanne Eberstein (S), 2,336 votes; Eva Lohman (M), 566 votes; Ingemar Nilsson (S), 460 votes; Kristina Nilsson (S), 2,304 votes; Jasenko Omanović (S), 1,496 votes; and Eva Sonidsson (S), 550 votes.
- Levelling seats (personal mandates) - Emil Källström (C), 1,916 votes.
- Levelling seats (party mandates) - Christina Höj Larsen (V), 424 votes.

===== 2010 =====
Results of the 2010 general election held on 19 September 2010:

Party		Votes per municipality							Total votes	%	Seats		
Party		Ånge	Härnö- sand	Kram- fors	Örns- köldsvik	Sollef- teå	Sunds- vall	Timrå	Total votes	%	Con.	Lev.	Tot.
Swedish Social Democratic Party	S	3,278	6,491	6,485	17,344	7,069	23,976	5,698	70,341	43.97%	5	0	5
Moderate Party	M	1,244	3,612	2,011	7,035	2,097	16,428	2,123	34,550	21.60%	2	0	2
Centre Party	C	505	1,200	1,268	3,503	870	3,211	628	11,185	6.99%	1	0	1
Left Party	V	453	1,039	1,079	1,513	952	3,767	839	9,642	6.03%	0	1	1
Green Party	MP	207	1,309	595	1,677	615	3,922	432	8,757	5.47%	0	0	0
Liberal People's Party	FP	212	884	396	1,560	468	4,171	562	8,253	5.16%	0	0	0
Sweden Democrats	SD	386	650	397	1,121	604	3,416	690	7,264	4.54%	0	0	0
Christian Democrats	KD	190	665	440	2,554	369	2,437	328	6,983	4.37%	0	0	0
Pirate Party	PP	44	127	65	177	63	446	59	981	0.61%	0	0	0
Norrland Coalition Party	NorrS	25	29	32	34	344	130	32	626	0.39%	0	0	0
Swedish Senior Citizen Interest Party	SPI	2	19	0	305	16	258	20	620	0.39%	0	0	0
Feminist Initiative	FI	7	101	59	73	34	192	25	491	0.31%	0	0	0
Socialist Justice Party	RS	1	3	1	10	2	42	9	68	0.04%	0	0	0
Rural Democrats		16	0	0	28	2	11	0	57	0.04%	0	0	0
Freedom Party		0	3	0	3	1	20	1	28	0.02%	0	0	0
Unity	ENH	2	4	2	3	4	11	1	27	0.02%	0	0	0
Party of the Swedes	SVP	0	3	0	3	0	8	0	14	0.01%	0	0	0
Spirits Party		0	4	0	3	1	5	0	13	0.01%	0	0	0
National Democrats	ND	1	1	1	2	0	5	1	11	0.01%	0	0	0
Health Care Party	Sjvåp	0	3	1	1	1	2	0	8	0.01%	0	0	0
Classical Liberal Party	KLP	0	0	0	0	0	2	0	2	0.00%	0	0	0
Active Democracy		0	0	0	0	1	0	0	1	0.00%	0	0	0
Communist Party of Sweden	SKP	0	0	0	0	1	0	0	1	0.00%	0	0	0
European Workers Party	EAP	1	0	0	0	0	0	0	1	0.00%	0	0	0
Freedom of the Justice Party	S-FRP	0	0	0	0	0	1	0	1	0.00%	0	0	0
Parties not on the ballot		4	2	3	13	6	20	2	50	0.03%	0	0	0
Valid votes		6,578	16,149	12,835	36,962	13,520	62,481	11,450	159,975	100.00%	8	1	9
Blank votes		84	127	142	385	126	653	108	1,625	1.01%			
Rejected votes – other		5	6	7	18	2	23	4	65	0.04%			
Total polled		6,667	16,282	12,984	37,365	13,648	63,157	11,562	161,665	84.57%			
Registered electors		8,086	19,479	15,431	43,549	16,283	74,602	13,720	191,150				
Turnout		82.45%	83.59%	84.14%	85.80%	83.82%	84.66%	84.27%	84.57%				

The following candidates were elected:

- Constituency seats (personal mandates) - Emil Källström (C), 1,268 votes.
- Constituency seats (party mandates) - Lena Asplund (M), 1,960 votes; Susanne Eberstein (S), 2,707 votes; Christina Karlsson (S), 1,858 votes; Eva Lohman (M), 1,292 votes; Ingemar Nilsson (S), 343 votes; Jasenko Omanović (S), 1,428 votes; and Eva Sonidsson (S), 811 votes.
- Levelling seats (party mandates) - Christina Höj Larsen (V), 301 votes.

==== 2000s ====
===== 2006 =====
Results of the 2006 general election held on 17 September 2006:

Party		Votes per municipality							Total votes	%	Seats		
Party		Ånge	Härnö- sand	Kram- fors	Örns- köldsvik	Sollef- teå	Sunds- vall	Timrå	Total votes	%	Con.	Lev.	Tot.
Swedish Social Democratic Party	S	3,135	6,267	6,380	17,368	6,672	24,921	5,772	70,515	45.96%	5	0	5
Moderate Party	M	901	3,033	1,629	5,255	1,700	12,436	1,365	26,319	17.16%	2	0	2
Centre Party	C	784	1,824	1,832	4,581	1,368	4,871	937	16,197	10.56%	1	0	1
Left Party	V	551	1,115	1,179	1,429	1,193	3,927	835	10,229	6.67%	1	0	1
Christian Democrats	KD	324	777	527	2,966	603	3,002	475	8,674	5.65%	0	1	1
Liberal People's Party	FP	220	800	379	1,567	525	4,300	497	8,288	5.40%	0	1	1
Green Party	MP	170	913	383	998	465	2,639	303	5,871	3.83%	0	0	0
Sweden Democrats	SD	211	343	172	345	283	1,667	379	3,400	2.22%	0	0	0
Health Care Party	Sjvåp	32	541	87	68	75	192	55	1,050	0.68%	0	0	0
Pirate Party	PP	42	132	59	140	86	395	60	914	0.60%	0	0	0
June List		55	32	32	85	37	377	73	691	0.45%	0	0	0
Feminist Initiative	FI	14	66	35	62	21	290	30	518	0.34%	0	0	0
Swedish Senior Citizen Interest Party	SPI	9	15	11	355	7	61	10	468	0.31%	0	0	0
Unity	ENH	3	25	5	19	8	36	4	100	0.07%	0	0	0
New Future	NYF	3	2	0	52	0	8	4	69	0.04%	0	0	0
Socialist Justice Party	RS	0	13	0	3	0	27	6	49	0.03%	0	0	0
People's Will		0	1	3	2	1	3	3	13	0.01%	0	0	0
National Socialist Front		0	0	0	3	2	6	1	12	0.01%	0	0	0
National Democrats	ND	0	3	1	0	2	1	0	7	0.00%	0	0	0
Freedom of the Justice Party	S-FRP	0	0	0	0	0	5	0	5	0.00%	0	0	0
Unique Party		0	0	1	0	0	2	1	4	0.00%	0	0	0
Classical Liberal Party	KLP	0	0	0	0	1	2	0	3	0.00%	0	0	0
The Communists	KOMM	1	0	0	0	0	0	0	1	0.00%	0	0	0
Rikshushållarna		0	0	0	1	0	0	0	1	0.00%	0	0	0
Other parties		0	3	2	6	3	4	1	19	0.01%	0	0	0
Valid votes		6,455	15,905	12,717	35,305	13,052	59,172	10,811	153,417	100.00%	9	2	11
Blank votes		116	198	185	602	224	978	176	2,479	1.59%			
Rejected votes – other		8	7	1	7	6	30	5	64	0.04%			
Total polled		6,579	16,110	12,903	35,914	13,282	60,180	10,992	155,960	81.53%			
Registered electors		8,381	19,682	15,973	43,350	16,736	73,576	13,584	191,282				
Turnout		78.50%	81.85%	80.78%	82.85%	79.36%	81.79%	80.92%	81.53%				

The following candidates were elected:

- Constituency seats (personal mandates) - Birgitta Sellén (C), 1,309 votes.
- Constituency seats (party mandates) - Lena Asplund (M), 702 votes; Susanne Eberstein (S), 1,825 votes; Bertil Kjellberg (M), 1,910 votes; Agneta Lundberg (S), 1,516 votes; Jasenko Omanović (S), 822 votes; Eva Sonidsson (S), 533 votes; Hans Stenberg (S), 1,371 votes; and Gunilla Wahlén (V), 407 votes.
- Levelling seats (party mandates) - Solveig Hellquist (FP), 470 votes; and Lars Lindén (KD), 532 votes.

Permanent substitutions:

- Lars Lindén (KD) resigned on 14 January 2009 and was replaced by Liza-Maria Norlin (KD) on 15 January 2009.

===== 2002 =====
Results of the 2002 general election held on 15 September 2002:

Party		Votes per municipality							Total votes	%	Seats		
Party		Ånge	Härnö- sand	Kram- fors	Örns- köldsvik	Sollef- teå	Sunds- vall	Timrå	Total votes	%	Con.	Lev.	Tot.
Swedish Social Democratic Party	S	3,247	6,997	6,644	18,053	7,004	26,627	5,914	74,486	49.34%	5	0	5
Left Party	V	777	1,472	1,637	2,443	1,511	5,719	1,343	14,902	9.87%	1	0	1
Centre Party	C	819	1,619	1,814	4,195	1,293	3,935	891	14,566	9.65%	1	0	1
Liberal People's Party	FP	399	1,552	698	2,782	748	6,939	856	13,974	9.26%	1	0	1
Moderate Party	M	451	1,533	880	2,243	891	6,263	581	12,842	8.51%	1	0	1
Christian Democrats	KD	418	1,133	757	3,590	975	3,946	631	11,450	7.58%	0	1	1
Green Party	MP	214	874	477	912	532	2,412	251	5,672	3.76%	0	0	0
Sweden Democrats	SD	68	67	47	48	87	791	161	1,269	0.84%	0	0	0
Swedish Senior Citizen Interest Party	SPI	27	33	11	353	16	354	39	833	0.55%	0	0	0
New Future	NYF	36	14	29	101	26	217	38	461	0.31%	0	0	0
Socialist Justice Party	RS	1	12	0	101	0	29	9	152	0.10%	0	0	0
Socialist Party	SOC.P	0	2	4	0	0	59	5	70	0.05%	0	0	0
Norrbotten Party	NBP	3	4	5	13	22	4	15	66	0.04%	0	0	0
Unity	ENH	1	21	1	0	1	9	0	33	0.02%	0	0	0
The Communists	KOMM	0	0	0	3	3	3	0	9	0.01%	0	0	0
New Swedes	DPNS	0	0	0	0	0	7	0	7	0.00%	0	0	0
Other parties		23	16	13	25	17	60	20	174	0.12%	0	0	0
Valid votes		6,484	15,349	13,017	34,862	13,126	57,374	10,754	150,966	100.00%	9	1	10
Rejected votes		99	212	194	395	230	815	102	2,047	1.34%			
Total polled		6,583	15,561	13,211	35,257	13,356	58,189	10,856	153,013	79.56%			
Registered electors		8,656	19,838	16,636	43,369	16,928	73,232	13,653	192,312				
Turnout		76.05%	78.44%	79.41%	81.30%	78.90%	79.46%	79.51%	79.56%				

The following candidates were elected:

- Constituency seats (personal mandates) - Bertil Kjellberg (M), 1,396 votes; and Birgitta Sellén (C), 1,442 votes.
- Constituency seats (party mandates) - Susanne Eberstein (S), 2,920 votes; Solveig Hellquist (FP), 657 votes; Kerstin Kristiansson Karlstedt (S), 1,086 votes; Agneta Lundberg (S), 1,790 votes; Göran Norlander (S), 789 votes; Hans Stenberg (S), 1,573 votes; and Gunilla Wahlén (V), 612 votes.
- Levelling seats (personal mandates) - Lars Lindén (KD), 1,242 votes.

==== 1990s ====
===== 1998 =====
Results of the 1998 general election held on 20 September 1998:

Party		Votes per municipality							Total votes	%	Seats		
Party		Ånge	Härnö- sand	Kram- fors	Örns- köldsvik	Sollef- teå	Sunds- vall	Timrå	Total votes	%	Con.	Lev.	Tot.
Swedish Social Democratic Party	S	3,272	6,629	6,909	16,960	7,311	24,649	5,527	71,257	45.13%	5	0	5
Left Party	V	1,287	2,204	2,216	4,173	2,405	8,885	2,134	23,304	14.76%	2	0	2
Moderate Party	M	752	2,918	1,510	4,104	1,546	9,776	1,010	21,616	13.69%	1	0	1
Christian Democrats	KD	606	1,800	1,169	4,791	1,131	5,710	865	16,072	10.18%	1	0	1
Centre Party	C	609	1,159	1,502	2,936	973	2,604	708	10,491	6.64%	0	1	1
Green Party	MP	307	914	492	1,097	545	2,672	388	6,415	4.06%	0	0	0
Liberal People's Party	FP	144	648	307	1,236	284	2,740	319	5,678	3.60%	0	0	0
Other parties		135	248	219	433	371	1,404	249	3,059	1.94%	0	0	0
Valid votes		7,112	16,520	14,324	35,730	14,566	58,440	11,200	157,892	100.00%	9	1	10
Rejected votes		174	300	285	616	218	1,321	144	3,058	1.90%			
Total polled		7,286	16,820	14,609	36,346	14,784	59,761	11,344	160,950	81.55%			
Registered electors		9,190	20,677	17,796	44,222	18,081	73,380	14,016	197,362				
Turnout		79.28%	81.35%	82.09%	82.19%	81.77%	81.44%	80.94%	81.55%				

The following candidates were elected:

- Constituency seats (personal mandates) - Per-Richard Molén (M), 2,339 votes.
- Constituency seats (party mandates) - Susanne Eberstein (S), 2,642 votes; Jan Erik Ågren (KD), 236 votes; Kerstin Kristiansson (S), 1,157 votes; Agneta Lundberg (S), 2,349 votes; Göran Norlander (S), 1,340 votes; Hans Stenberg (S), 1,716 votes; Claes Stockhaus (V), 821 votes; and Gunilla Wahlén (V), 1,215 votes.
- Levelling seats (personal mandates) - Birgitta Sellén (C), 1,406 votes.

Permanent substitutions:

- Per-Richard Molén (M) resigned on 14 January 2002 and was replaced by Lennart Bolander (M) on the same day.

===== 1994 =====
Results of the 1994 general election held on 18 September 1994:

Party		Votes per municipality							Total votes	%	Seats		
Party		Ånge	Härnö- sand	Kram- fors	Örns- köldsvik	Sollef- teå	Sunds- vall	Timrå	Total votes	%	Con.	Lev.	Tot.
Swedish Social Democratic Party	S	4,546	8,259	9,296	22,184	10,023	33,235	7,723	95,266	55.00%	6	0	6
Moderate Party	M	783	3,565	1,727	4,454	1,741	9,305	960	22,535	13.01%	2	0	2
Centre Party	C	1,025	2,000	2,130	4,208	1,525	4,090	935	15,913	9.19%	1	0	1
Left Party	V	708	1,197	1,271	1,743	1,160	4,463	1,124	11,666	6.74%	1	0	1
Liberal People's Party	FP	249	1,135	476	2,477	546	4,935	614	10,432	6.02%	0	1	1
Green Party	MP	529	1,216	677	1,511	795	3,225	439	8,392	4.84%	0	1	1
Christian Democratic Unity	KDS	187	696	563	2,502	459	1,932	347	6,686	3.86%	0	0	0
New Democracy	NyD	54	160	47	177	89	563	101	1,191	0.69%	0	0	0
Other parties		57	127	46	216	64	524	95	1,129	0.65%	0	0	0
Valid votes		8,138	18,355	16,233	39,472	16,402	62,272	12,338	173,210	100.00%	10	2	12
Rejected votes		100	230	173	351	187	671	93	1,805	1.03%			
Total polled		8,238	18,585	16,406	39,823	16,589	62,943	12,431	175,015	87.08%			
Registered electors		9,718	21,400	18,655	45,107	18,966	72,846	14,292	200,984				
Turnout		84.77%	86.85%	87.94%	88.29%	87.47%	86.41%	86.98%	87.08%				

The following candidates were elected: Eva Björne (M); Susanne Eberstein (S); Sigge Godin (FP); Bo Holmberg (S); Jan Jennehag (V); Agneta Lundberg (S); Sven Lundberg (S); Per-Richard Molén (M); Roy Ottosson (MP); Hans Stenberg (S); Britta Sundin (S); and Görel Thurdin (C).

Permanent substitutions:

- Per-Richard Molén (M) resigned on 2 October 1994 and was replaced by Göran R. Hedberg (M) on the same day.
- Göran R. Hedberg (M) died on 15 December 1995 and was replaced by Mona Ritzén (M) on 18 December 1995.
- Mona Ritzén (M) resigned on 19 December 1995 and was replaced by Åke Sundqvist (M) on the same day.
- Bo Holmberg (S) resigned on 29 June 1996 and was replaced by Kerstin Kristiansson Karlstedt (S) on 30 June 1996.

===== 1991 =====
Results of the 1991 general election held on 15 September 1991:

Party		Votes per municipality							Total votes	%	Seats		
Party		Ånge	Härnö- sand	Kram- fors	Örns- köldsvik	Sollef- teå	Sunds- vall	Timrå	Total votes	%	Con.	Lev.	Tot.
Swedish Social Democratic Party	S	3,928	7,017	8,749	19,338	9,295	28,202	6,695	83,224	47.95%	6	0	6
Moderate Party	M	813	3,544	1,727	4,140	1,873	9,405	1,041	22,543	12.99%	1	0	1
Centre Party	C	1,296	2,335	2,494	5,106	1,920	5,288	1,173	19,612	11.30%	1	0	1
Liberal People's Party	FP	333	1,390	598	2,923	670	5,999	828	12,741	7.34%	1	0	1
Christian Democratic Unity	KDS	430	1,298	1,062	4,015	884	3,925	673	12,287	7.08%	1	0	1
Left Party	V	530	803	1,119	1,145	954	3,376	854	8,781	5.06%	0	1	1
New Democracy	NyD	445	1,063	541	1,778	584	3,260	534	8,205	4.73%	0	1	1
Green Party	MP	323	765	428	924	511	2,156	239	5,346	3.08%	0	0	0
Other parties		57	78	34	103	60	404	91	827	0.48%	0	0	0
Valid votes		8,155	18,293	16,752	39,472	16,751	62,015	12,128	173,566	100.00%	10	2	12
Rejected votes		107	209	218	509	201	827	120	2,191	1.25%			
Total polled		8,262	18,502	16,970	39,981	16,952	62,842	12,248	175,757	86.82%			
Registered electors		9,924	21,316	19,340	45,575	19,345	72,746	14,196	202,442				
Turnout		83.25%	86.80%	87.75%	87.73%	87.63%	86.39%	86.28%	86.82%				

The following candidates were elected: Jan Erik Ågren (KDS); Bo Forslund (S); Sigge Godin (FP); Bo Holmberg (S); Jan Jennehag (V); Sven Lundberg (S); Per-Richard Molén (M); Karl Gustaf Sjödin (NyD); Elvy Söderström (S); Hans Stenberg (S); Britta Sundin (S); and Görel Thurdin (C).

==== 1980s ====
===== 1988 =====
Results of the 1988 general election held on 18 September 1988:

Party		Votes per municipality							Total votes	%	Seats		
Party		Ånge	Härnö- sand	Kram- fors	Örns- köldsvik	Sollef- teå	Sunds- vall	Timrå	Total votes	%	Con.	Lev.	Tot.
Swedish Social Democratic Party	S	4,515	7,666	9,241	20,571	10,133	30,416	7,083	89,625	51.64%	6	0	6
Centre Party	C	1,599	3,284	3,147	6,586	2,355	7,390	1,500	25,861	14.90%	2	0	2
Moderate Party	M	546	2,535	1,322	3,046	1,361	6,760	672	16,242	9.36%	1	0	1
Liberal People's Party	FP	489	1,734	765	3,636	853	6,947	931	15,355	8.85%	1	0	1
Left Party – Communists	VPK	631	1,126	1,288	1,366	1,038	3,919	1,009	10,377	5.98%	0	1	1
Green Party	MP	482	1,156	868	1,856	1,056	3,011	433	8,862	5.11%	0	1	1
Christian Democratic Unity	KDS	232	504	496	2,293	441	1,929	345	6,240	3.60%	0	0	0
Other parties		13	26	119	164	9	650	25	1,006	0.58%	0	0	0
Valid votes		8,507	18,031	17,246	39,518	17,246	61,022	11,998	173,568	100.00%	10	2	12
Rejected votes		89	182	167	410	158	629	84	1,719	0.98%			
Total polled		8,596	18,213	17,413	39,928	17,404	61,651	12,082	175,287	86.61%			
Registered electors		10,156	21,194	19,700	45,532	19,763	72,056	13,994	202,395				
Turnout		84.64%	85.93%	88.39%	87.69%	88.06%	85.56%	86.34%	86.61%				

The following candidates were elected: Eva Björne (M); Bo Forslund (S); Sigge Godin (FP); Bo Holmberg (S); Jan Jennehag (VPK); Rune Jonsson (S); Sven Lundberg (S); Martin Olsson (C); Roy Ottosson (MP); {Martin Segerstedt (S); Britta Sundin (S); and Görel Thurdin (C).

===== 1985 =====
Results of the 1985 general election held on 15 September 1985:

Party		Votes per municipality							Total votes	%	Seats		
Party		Ånge	Härnö- sand	Kram- fors	Örns- köldsvik	Sollef- teå	Sunds- vall	Timrå	Total votes	%	Con.	Lev.	Tot.
Swedish Social Democratic Party	S	5,184	8,389	10,264	21,922	10,938	33,133	7,554	97,384	53.21%	6	0	6
Centre Party	C	1,926	3,925	3,817	8,929	3,011	8,701	1,831	32,140	17.56%	2	0	2
Moderate Party	M	776	3,381	1,828	4,414	1,890	9,112	1,015	22,416	12.25%	1	0	1
Liberal People's Party	FP	617	2,111	1,036	4,390	1,039	8,101	1,012	18,306	10.00%	1	0	1
Left Party – Communists	VPK	563	966	1,310	1,351	1,019	3,733	869	9,811	5.36%	0	1	1
Green Party	MP	175	354	236	411	283	842	100	2,401	1.31%	0	0	0
Other parties		7	42	20	101	24	340	27	561	0.31%	0	0	0
Valid votes		9,248	19,168	18,511	41,518	18,204	63,962	12,408	183,019	100.00%	10	1	11
Rejected votes		49	131	117	275	114	480	68	1,234	0.67%			
Total polled		9,297	19,299	18,628	41,793	18,318	64,442	12,476	184,253	90.47%			
Registered electors		10,425	21,350	20,211	45,864	20,176	71,908	13,717	203,651				
Turnout		89.18%	90.39%	92.17%	91.12%	90.79%	89.62%	90.95%	90.47%				

The following candidates were elected: Thorbjörn Fälldin (C); Bo Forslund (S); Sigge Godin (FP); Sven Henricsson (VPK); Bo Holmberg (S); Rune Jonsson (S); Sven Lundberg (S); Per-Richard Molén (M); Martin Olsson (C); Martin Segerstedt (S); and Britta Sundin (S).

Permanent substitutions:

- Thorbjörn Fälldin (C) resigned on 10 January 1986 and was replaced by Görel Thurdin (C) on 11 January 1986.
- Sven Henricsson (VPK) resigned in October 1986 and was replaced by Jan Jennehag (VPK) on 6 October 1986.

===== 1982 =====
Results of the 1982 general election held on 19 September 1982:

Party		Votes per municipality							Total votes	%	Seats		
Party		Ånge	Härnö- sand	Kram- fors	Örns- köldsvik	Sollef- teå	Sunds- vall	Timrå	Total votes	%	Con.	Lev.	Tot.
Swedish Social Democratic Party	S	5,315	8,686	10,655	22,132	11,170	34,257	7,753	99,968	53.69%	6	1	7
Centre Party	C	2,189	5,099	4,469	9,961	3,543	11,604	2,127	38,992	20.94%	3	0	3
Moderate Party	M	792	3,286	1,693	4,641	1,952	9,728	1,017	23,109	12.41%	1	1	2
Left Party – Communists	VPK	549	1,009	1,325	1,307	1,091	3,743	819	9,843	5.29%	0	1	1
Liberal People's Party	FP	234	614	356	1,926	327	3,150	390	6,997	3.76%	0	0	0
Christian Democratic Unity	KDS	170	300	372	1,613	327	1,161	304	4,247	2.28%	0	0	0
Green Party	MP	104	448	206	435	298	975	116	2,582	1.39%	0	0	0
K-Party	K-P	4	13	94	68	13	145	7	344	0.18%	0	0	0
Other parties		2	10	6	8	2	64	7	99	0.05%	0	0	0
Valid votes		9,359	19,465	19,176	42,091	18,723	64,827	12,540	186,181	100.00%	10	3	13
Rejected votes		68	205	151	251	96	517	65	1,353	0.72%			
Total polled		9,427	19,670	19,327	42,342	18,819	65,344	12,605	187,534	92.23%			
Registered electors		10,474	21,336	20,721	45,565	20,300	71,270	13,673	203,339				
Turnout		90.00%	92.19%	93.27%	92.93%	92.70%	91.69%	92.19%	92.23%				

The following candidates were elected: Thorbjörn Fälldin (C); Bo Forslund (S); Nils-Olof Grönhagen (S); Sven Henricsson (VPK); Rune Jonsson (S); Per-Richard Molén (M); Barbro Nilsson (S); Sven-Eric Nordin (N); Erik Olsson (M); Martin Olsson (C); Stig Olsson (S); Martin Segerstedt (S); and Bengt Wiklund (S).

Permanent substitutions:

- Nils-Olof Grönhagen (S) died on 26 March 1983 and was replaced by Sven Lundberg (S) on 30 March 1983.

==== 1970s ====
===== 1979 =====
Results of the 1979 general election held on 16 September 1979:

Party		Votes per municipality							Total votes	%	Seats		
Party		Ånge	Härnö- sand	Kram- fors	Örns- köldsvik	Sollef- teå	Sunds- vall	Timrå	Total votes	%	Con.	Lev.	Tot.
Swedish Social Democratic Party	S	5,185	8,116	10,789	20,886	10,959	31,829	7,392	95,156	51.22%	5	1	6
Centre Party	C	2,604	5,684	4,924	10,970	4,218	12,930	2,562	43,892	23.62%	3	0	3
Moderate Party	M	695	2,935	1,589	3,771	1,713	8,321	970	19,994	10.76%	1	0	1
Liberal People's Party	FP	433	1,116	600	3,424	574	5,357	616	12,120	6.52%	1	0	1
Left Party – Communists	VPK	622	1,115	1,297	1,312	1,018	3,864	814	10,042	5.40%	0	1	1
Christian Democratic Unity	KDS	149	254	302	1,282	274	791	210	3,262	1.76%	0	0	0
Workers' Party – The Communists	APK	2	22	203	151	98	231	6	713	0.38%	0	0	0
Communist Party of Sweden	SKP	11	15	20	87	13	241	37	424	0.23%	0	0	0
Other parties		6	33	11	23	15	94	9	191	0.10%	0	0	0
Valid votes		9,707	19,290	19,735	41,906	18,882	63,658	12,616	185,794	100.00%	10	2	12
Rejected votes		42	106	96	161	72	252	28	757	0.41%			
Total polled		9,749	19,396	19,831	42,067	18,954	63,910	12,644	186,551	92.05%			
Registered electors		10,661	21,079	21,260	45,425	20,482	70,065	13,695	202,667				
Turnout		91.45%	92.02%	93.28%	92.61%	92.54%	91.22%	92.33%	92.05%				

The following candidates were elected: Thorbjörn Fälldin (C); Bo Forslund (S); Nils-Olof Grönhagen (S); Sven Henricsson (VPK); Rune Jonsson (S); Sven-Eric Nordin (N); Martin Olsson (C); Stig Olsson (S); Martin Segerstedt (S); Rolf Sellgren (FP); Bengt Wiklund (S); and Håkan Winberg (M).

===== 1976 =====
Results of the 1976 general election held on 19 September 1976:

Party		Votes per municipality							Total votes	%	Seats		
Party		Ånge	Härnö- sand	Kram- fors	Örns- köldsvik	Sollef- teå	Sunds- vall	Timrå	Total votes	%	Con.	Lev.	Tot.
Swedish Social Democratic Party	S	5,176	8,034	11,143	20,444	10,664	31,293	7,181	93,935	50.37%	6	0	6
Centre Party	C	3,144	6,533	5,935	12,608	5,209	16,493	3,126	53,048	28.44%	3	1	4
Moderate Party	M	447	2,107	1,100	2,521	1,360	5,540	511	13,586	7.28%	1	0	1
People's Party	F	430	1,241	621	3,574	560	5,625	610	12,661	6.79%	1	0	1
Left Party – Communists	VPK	597	901	1,427	1,321	985	3,374	754	9,359	5.02%	0	1	1
Christian Democratic Unity	KDS	146	269	286	1,287	283	792	214	3,277	1.76%	0	0	0
Communist Party of Sweden	SKP	10	38	29	143	44	298	15	577	0.31%	0	0	0
Other parties		0	14	5	15	3	15	3	55	0.03%	0	0	0
Valid votes		9,950	19,137	20,546	41,913	19,108	63,430	12,414	186,498	100.00%	11	2	13
Rejected votes		26	67	72	87	52	177	16	497	0.27%			
Total polled		9,976	19,204	20,618	42,000	19,160	63,607	12,430	186,995	92.65%			
Registered electors		10,889	20,694	21,917	45,146	20,475	69,332	13,370	201,823				
Turnout		91.62%	92.80%	94.07%	93.03%	93.58%	91.74%	92.97%	92.65%				

The following candidates were elected: Thorbjörn Fälldin (C); Bo Forslund (S); Ivar Högström (S); Rune Jonsson (S); Gustav Lorentzon (VPK); Sven-Eric Nordin (N); Margit Odelsparr (C); Martin Olsson (C); Stig Olsson (S); Martin Segerstedt (S); Rolf Sellgren (F); Bengt Wiklund (S); and Håkan Winberg (M).

===== 1973 =====
Results of the 1973 general election held on 16 September 1973:

Party		Votes per municipality							Total votes	%	Seats		
Party		Ånge	Härnö- sand	Kram- fors	Örns- köldsvik	Sollef- teå	Sunds- vall	Timrå	Total votes	%	Con.	Lev.	Tot.
Swedish Social Democratic Party	S	5,147	8,139	11,112	19,442	10,303	29,642	6,828	90,613	50.68%	6	0	6
Centre Party	C	2,915	6,251	5,541	11,526	5,249	15,265	2,771	49,518	27.70%	3	0	3
Moderate Party	M	353	1,859	936	2,256	1,247	4,976	410	12,037	6.73%	1	0	1
Left Party – Communists	VPK	798	921	1,829	1,628	1,154	4,128	888	11,346	6.35%	1	0	1
People's Party	F	457	1,025	527	2,912	413	4,235	532	10,101	5.65%	0	1	1
Christian Democratic Unity	KDS	166	284	368	1,838	334	1,008	229	4,227	2.36%	0	0	0
Communist Party of Sweden	SKP	20	54	68	152	59	264	18	635	0.36%	0	0	0
Communist League Marxist–Leninists (the revolutionaries)	KFML(r)	13	24	65	35	23	87	11	258	0.14%	0	0	0
Other parties		7	4	3	5	8	25	1	53	0.03%	0	0	0
Valid votes		9,876	18,561	20,449	39,794	18,790	59,630	11,688	178,788	100.00%	11	1	12
Rejected votes		22	15	26	33	16	121	8	241	0.13%			
Total polled		9,898	18,576	20,475	39,827	18,806	59,751	11,696	179,029	92.06%			
Registered electors		10,909	20,071	21,820	43,208	20,259	65,496	12,715	194,478				
Turnout		90.73%	92.55%	93.84%	92.18%	92.83%	91.23%	91.99%	92.06%				

The following candidates were elected: Thorbjörn Fälldin (C); Ivar Högström (S); Ann-Mari Laag (S); Gustav Lorentzon (VPK); Sven-Eric Nordin (N); Martin Olsson (C); Stig Olsson (S); Rolf Sellgren (F); Otto Stadling (S); Bernhard Sundelin (S); Bengt Wiklund (S); and Håkan Winberg (M).

Permanent substitutions:

- Ann-Mari Laag (S) died on 30 March 1975 and was replaced by Bo Forslund (S) on 1 April 1975.

===== 1970 =====
Results of the 1970 general election held on 20 September 1970:

Party		Votes per municipality																				Total votes	%	Seats		
Party		Ånge	Bateå	Bjärt- rå	Fjälls- jö	Härnö- sand	Indals- Liden	Kram- fors	Mat- fors	Nju- runda	Nora- ström	Nord- ingrå	Örns- köldsvik	Ram- sele	Sollef- teå	Stöde	Sunds- vall	Timrå	Ullån- ger	Ytter- lännäs	Postal votes	Total votes	%	Con.	Lev.	Tot.
Swedish Social Democratic Party	S	4,664	886	1,061	1,898	6,197	1,115	4,525	1,792	4,048	538	641	17,681	1,371	7,263	893	17,495	5,873	641	2,709	11,499	92,790	52.24%	6	1	7
Centre Party	C	2,146	431	369	943	3,821	762	991	1,255	1,213	674	687	8,031	660	3,148	667	6,019	1,742	765	870	5,728	40,922	23.04%	3	0	3
People's Party	F	533	20	54	115	1,041	150	225	288	622	64	85	3,724	56	537	143	4,457	713	102	130	3,787	16,846	9.48%	1	0	1
Left Party – Communists	VPK	772	108	147	332	723	91	1,024	222	796	87	12	1,493	223	768	149	2,227	812	31	309	1,367	11,693	6.58%	1	0	1
Moderate Party	M	210	46	35	138	1,056	92	186	93	195	94	121	1,457	94	717	50	2,155	233	82	138	3,240	10,432	5.87%	0	1	1
Christian Democratic Unity	KDS	159	22	21	61	246	75	54	65	83	31	74	1,630	57	161	43	631	181	69	71	752	4,486	2.53%	0	0	0
Communist League Marxists-Leninists	KFML	8	4	6	1	25	1	38	0	10	1	2	90	3	8	0	42	3	3	23	143	411	0.23%	0	0	0
Other parties		0	0	0	0	2	0	0	0	0	0	0	1	0	1	0	0	0	0	0	35	39	0.02%	0	0	0
Valid votes		8,492	1,517	1,693	3,488	13,111	2,286	7,043	3,715	6,967	1,489	1,622	34,107	2,464	12,603	1,945	33,026	9,557	1,693	4,250	26,551	177,619	100.00%	11	2	13
Rejected votes		10	1	2	4	18	1	4	2	4	1	0	25	3	7	1	21	6	0	3	88	201	0.11%			
Total polled exc. postal votes		8,502	1,518	1,695	3,492	13,129	2,287	7,047	3,717	6,971	1,490	1,622	34,132	2,467	12,610	1,946	33,047	9,563	1,693	4,253	26,639	177,820				
Postal votes		1,543	186	211	579	4,534	283	1,065	385	838	257	163	4,633	317	2,486	198	6,575	1,515	189	524	-26,639	-158				
Total polled inc. postal votes		10,045	1,704	1,906	4,071	17,663	2,570	8,112	4,102	7,809	1,747	1,785	38,765	2,784	15,096	2,144	39,622	11,078	1,882	4,777	0	177,662	89.06%			
Registered electors		11,449	1,863	2,101	4,593	19,828	2,912	8,755	4,724	8,786	1,917	1,885	43,335	3,097	16,771	2,487	45,390	12,320	2,056	5,206		199,475				
Turnout		87.74%	91.47%	90.72%	88.63%	89.08%	88.26%	92.66%	86.83%	88.88%	91.13%	94.69%	89.45%	89.89%	90.01%	86.21%	87.29%	89.92%	91.54%	91.76%		89.06%				

The following candidates were elected: Thorbjörn Fälldin (C); Gunnar Hedlund (C); Ivar Högström (S); Rune Jonsson (S); Ann-Mari Laag (S); Gustav Lorentzon (VPK); Martin Olsson (C); Stig Olsson (S); Rolf Sellgren (F); Otto Stadling (S); Bernhard Sundelin (S); Bengt Wiklund (S); and Håkan Winberg (M).
