= Gunilla =

Gunilla is a Swedish female name, derived from Gunhild. It was among the top feminine names in the Scandinavian countries in the 1940s.

== People named Gunilla ==
- Gunilla Andersson (born 1975), ice hockey player from Sweden
- Gunilla Bergström (1942–2021), Swedish author, journalist, and illustrator
- Gunilla Bielke (1568–1597), the second spouse and queen consort of John III of Sweden
- Gunilla Carlsson (born 1963), Swedish politician
- Gunilla Carlsson (Social Democrat) (born 1966), Swedish Social Democratic politician
- Gunilla Florby (1943–2011), Swedish academic
- Gunilla Forseth (born 1985), Norwegian football striker
- Gunilla Gerland (born 1963). Swedish author
- Gunilla Gomér (born 1960), Swedeish politician
- Gunilla Hutton (born 1944), Swedish actress
- Gunilla Knutsson (1940–2025), Swedish model, actress and author
- Gunilla Lindberg (born 1947), Swedish sports official
- Gunilla Paijkull (born 1943), Swedish footballer and coach
- Gunilla Süssmann (born 1977), Norwegian classical pianist
- Gunilla Sköld-Feiler (born 1953), Swedish artist
- Gunilla Svärd (born 1970), Swedish orienteering competitor
- Gunilla Tjernberg (1950–2019), Swedish Christian Democratic politician
- Gunilla Wahlén (born 1951), Swedish Left Party politician
- Gunilla Backman (born 1965), Swedish Singer
