= Peter Hedberg =

Swedish politician (born 1990)

Member of the Riksdag
- Incumbent
- Assumed office 26 September 2022
- Constituency: Västernorrland County

Personal details
- Born: Peter André Hedberg; 1990 (age 35–36)
- Party: Social Democratic Party

Peter "Pira" André Hedberg (born 1990) is a Swedish politician, teacher and member of the Riksdag, the national legislature. A member of the Social Democratic Party, he has represented Västernorrland County since September 2022. He is a member of the municipal council in Kramfors Municipality. He is a teacher.
