= Salsåker-Ullångers IF =

Swedish football club

- Full name: Salsåker-Ullångers Idrottsförening
- Nickname: SUIF
- Ground: Kinavallen; Ullånger; Sweden
- League: Division 3 Mellersta Norrland
- 2009: Division 4 Ångermanland, 1st (Promoted)
Home colours

Salsåker-Ullångers IF is a Swedish football club located in Ullånger in Kramfors Municipality, Västernorrland County.

== Background ==
During the years 1984 to 2010 the club has existed in various forms covering the Höga Kusten area – namely Bjärtrå IS, Docksta BTK, Norabygdens IK, Nordingrå SK, Skogs IF and Salsåker-Ullångers IF – with football being the club's main activity. The purpose of this collaborative project has been to be able to offer football as sport for to members of village clubs without those members having to leave their local club.

Successful cooperation between the local clubs first took place at youth football level but over the years has progressed to senior football. The names of the teams in the league in the district over the years has varied from DUFF-84 (Docksta Ullånger Framtida Fotboll), Nora/Nordingrå, S/D Fotboll, NSD Höga Kusten and Höga Kusten Fotboll.

Special recognition was given to the club in May 2008 by the Ångermanlands Fotbollförbund for their work over 25 years in providing football in collaboration across a number of villages.

Since their foundation the club has participated mainly in the lower divisions of the Swedish football league system. The club currently plays in Division 3 Mellersta Norrland which is the fifth tier of Swedish football. They play their home matches at the Kinavallen in Ullånger.

Salsåker-Ullångers IF are affiliated to the Ångermanlands Fotbollförbund.

== Season to season ==
Salsåker-Ullångers IF were previously known as Höga Kusten Fotboll (or Högakusten) and SUIF/Docksta in the years prior to 2010.

Season	Level	Division	Section	Position	Movements
1999	Tier 7	Division 6	Ångermanland Södra/Västra	6th	SUIF/Docksta
2000	Tier 7	Division 6	Ångermanland Södra/Västra	6th	SUIF/Docksta
2001	Tier 7	Division 6	Ångermanland Södra/Västra	1st	SUIF/Docksta – Promoted
2002	Tier 6	Division 5	Ångermanland	5th	SUIF/Docksta
2003	Tier 6	Division 5	Ångermanland	1st	SUIF/Docksta – Promoted
2004	Tier 5	Division 4	Ångermanland	1st	SUIF/Docksta – Promotion Playoffs
2005	Tier 5	Division 4	Ångermanland	11th	SUIF/Docksta – Relegated
2006*	Tier 7	Division 5	Ångermanland	2nd	Högakusten – Promoted
2007	Tier 6	Division 4	Ångermanland	7th	Högakusten
2008	Tier 6	Division 4	Ångermanland	9th	Högakusten
2009	Tier 6	Division 4	Ångermanland	1st	Högakusten – Promoted
2010	Tier 5	Division 3	Mellersta Norrland	7th	

* League restructuring in 2006 resulted in a new division being created at Tier 3 and subsequent divisions dropping a level.

== Attendances ==
In recent seasons Salsåker-Ullångers IF have had the following average attendances:

Season	Average attendance	Division / Section	Level
2009	Not available	Div 4 Ångermanland	Tier 6
2010	130	Div 3 Mellersta Norrland	Tier 5

* Attendances are provided in the Publikliga sections of the Svenska Fotbollförbundet website.

The attendance record for Höga Kusten Fotboll (SUIF) was 465 spectators for the match against Kramfors-Alliansen on 27 June 2009 (Division 4 Ångermanland).
