= Jasenko Omanović =

Swedish politician (born 1967)

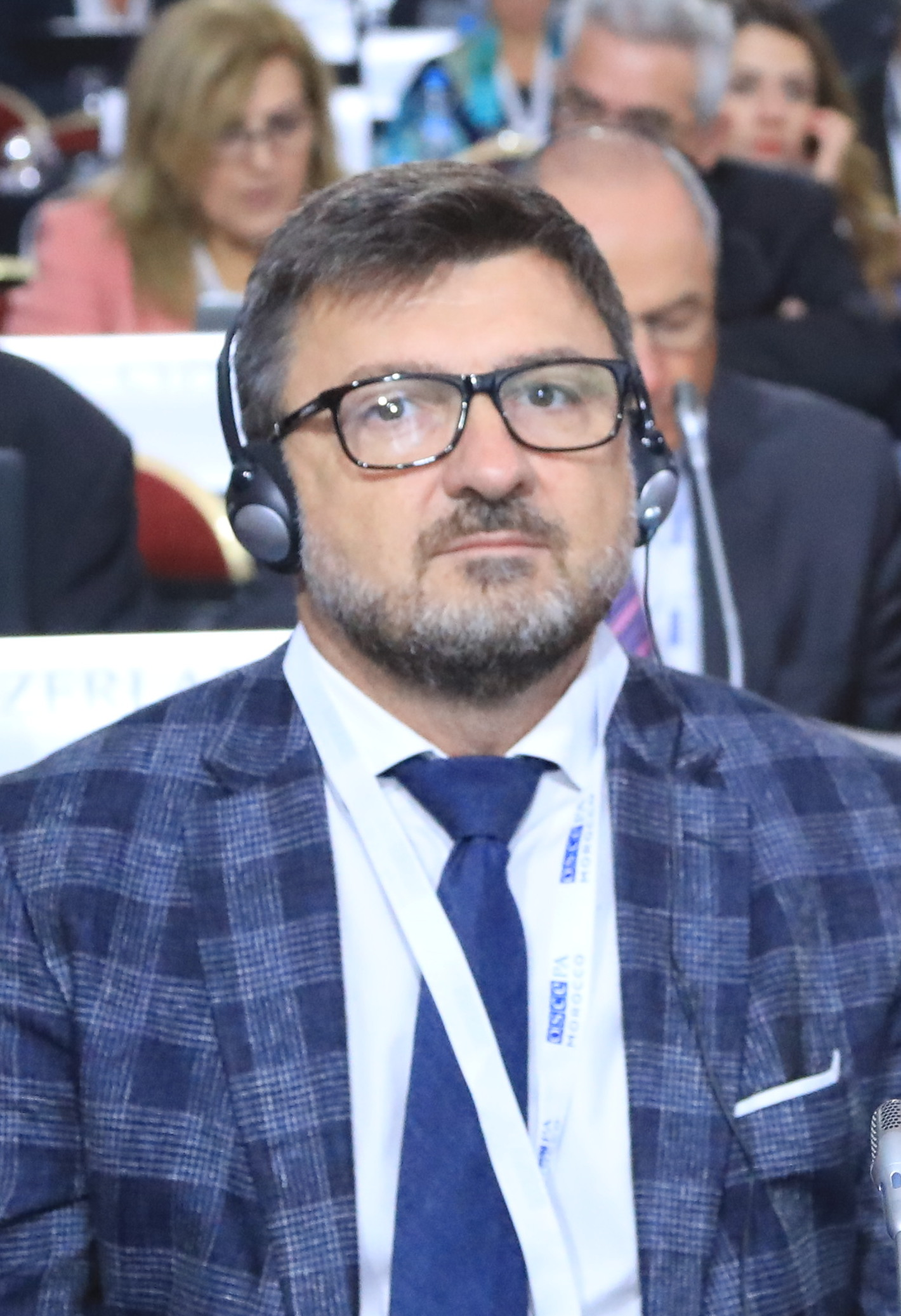
- Omanović in October 2019

Member of the Riksdag
- In office 1 September 2021 – 26 September 2022
- Preceded by: Ingemar Nilsson
- Constituency: Västernorrland County
- In office 2 October 2006 – 24 September 2018
- Constituency: Västernorrland County

Personal details
- Born: Jasenko Omanović; 1967 (age 58–59)
- Party: Social Democratic Party

Jasenko Omanović (born 1967) is a Swedish politician and former member of the Riksdag, the national legislature. A member of the Social Democratic Party, he represented Västernorrland County between October 2006 and September 2018, and between September 2021 and September 2022. He was a substitute member of the Riksdag for Stefan Löfven between September 2018 to August 2021.

Omanović is the son of Sakib Omanovic and economist Bekira Omanovic (née Dolic) He studied electrical engineering in Banja Luka, Bosnia and Herzegovina. He fled to Sweden as a refugee during the Bosnian War. He has been a member of the municipal council in Härnösand Municipality since 2002.
