= Liza-Maria Norlin =

Swedish politician (born 1980)

Member of the Riksdag
- In office 2 April 2024 – 16 June 2024
- Preceded by: Christian Carlsson
- Succeeded by: Christian Carlsson
- Constituency: Stockholm County
- In office 15 January 2009 – 4 October 2010
- Preceded by: Lars Lindén
- Constituency: Västernorrland County

Personal details
- Born: 3 March 1980 (age 46)
- Party: Christian Democrats

Liza-Maria Norlin (born 3 March 1980) is a Swedish politician serving as secretary of the Christian Democrats since 2023. She was a member of the Riksdag from 2009 to 2010 and from April to June 2024.
