= Malin Larsson =

Swedish politician (born 1980)

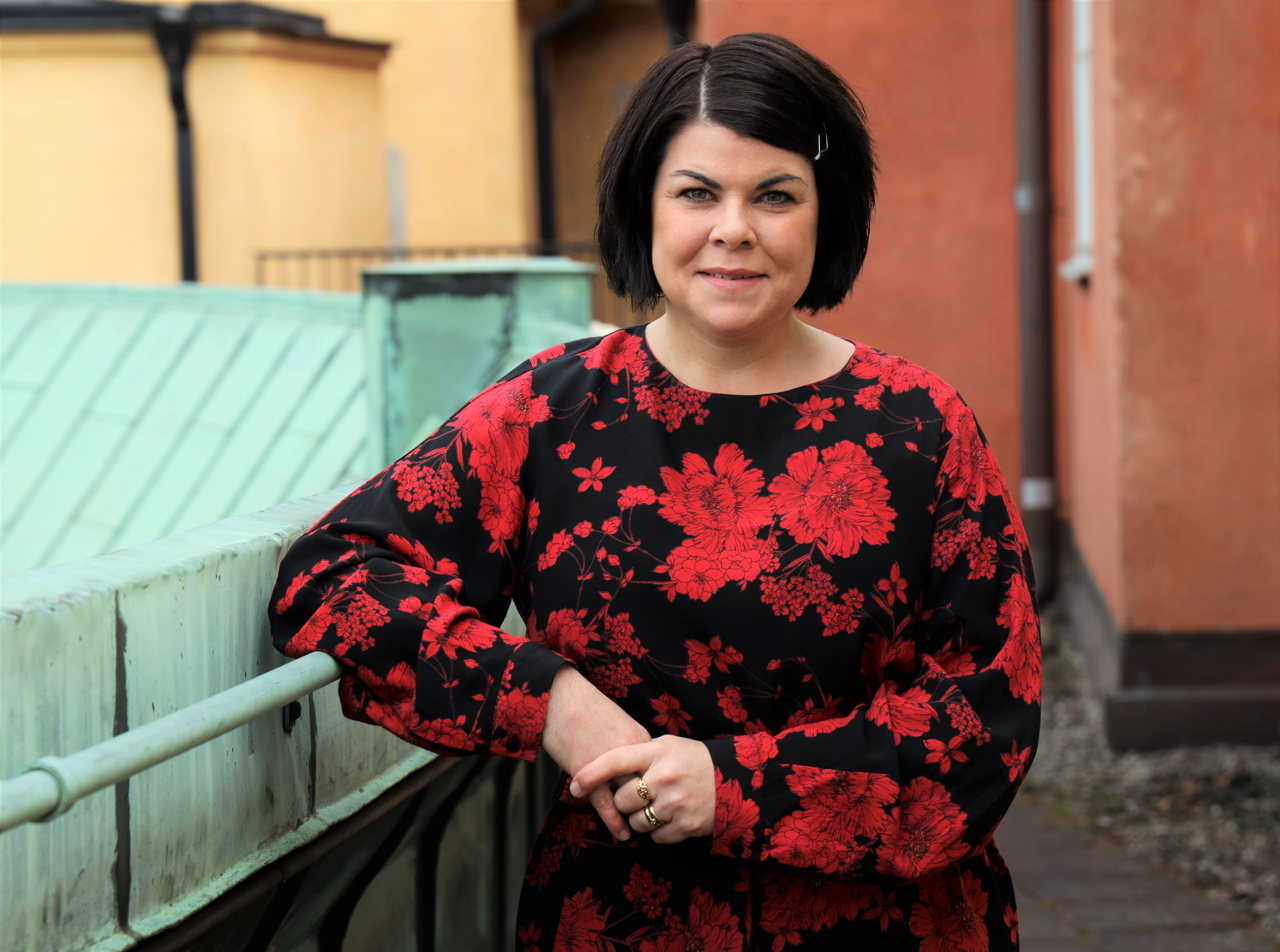
- Larsson in 2022

Member of the Riksdag
- Incumbent
- Assumed office 24 September 2018
- Constituency: Västernorrland County

Personal details
- Born: Malin Lindberg; 1980 (age 45–46)
- Party: Social Democratic Party
- Education: Mid Sweden University

Malin Larsson (née Lindberg; born 1980) is a Swedish politician and member of the Riksdag, the national legislature. A member of the Social Democratic Party, she has represented Västernorrland County since September 2018.

Larsson is the daughter of site manager Olle Lindberg and nurse Sonja Lindberg (née Wennberg). She was educated in Matfors and Sundsvall. She has a master's degree from Umeå University and a political science degree from Mid Sweden University. She has worked as shop worker, substitute teacher and bank clerk. She has been a member of the municipal council in Sundsvall Municipality since 2010.
