= Norlander =

Norlander may refer to:

- Emil Norlander (1865-1935), Swedish journalist, author, songwriter and producer
- Erik Norlander (born 1967), musician
- Göran Norlander (born 1945), Swedish politician
- Johnny Norlander (1921-2002), basketball player
- Stephanie Norlander (born 1995), Canadian field hockey player
