= Forseth =

Forseth is a surname. Notable people with the surname include:

- Einar Forseth (1892–1988), Swedish artist
- Gunilla Forseth (born 1985), Norwegian football striker
- Paul Forseth (born 1946), Canadian politician
- Ulf Forseth Indgaard (born 1989), Norwegian orienteering competitor
