= Peder Björk =

Swedish politician (born 1975)

- Björk in October 2022

Member of the Riksdag
- Incumbent
- Assumed office 26 September 2022
- Constituency: Västernorrland County

Personal details
- Born: Peder Gustav Björk; 1975 (age 50–51)
- Party: Social Democratic Party

Peder Gustav Björk (born 1975) is a Swedish politician and member of the Riksdag, the national legislature. A member of the Social Democratic Party, he has represented Västernorrland County since September 2022. He had previously been a member of the municipal council in Sundsvall Municipality.
