= Mjällom =

- Location within Västernorrland Location within Sweden
- Coordinates: 62°59′N 18°26′E
- Country: Sweden
- Province: Ångermanland
- County: Västernorrland County
- Municipality: Kramfors Municipality

Area
  - Total: 0.71 km^{2} (0.27 sq mi)

Population (31 December 2010)
  - Total: 275
  - Density: 390/km^{2} (1,000/sq mi)
- Time zone: UTC+1 (CET)
  - Summer (DST): UTC+2 (CEST)
- Climate: Dfc

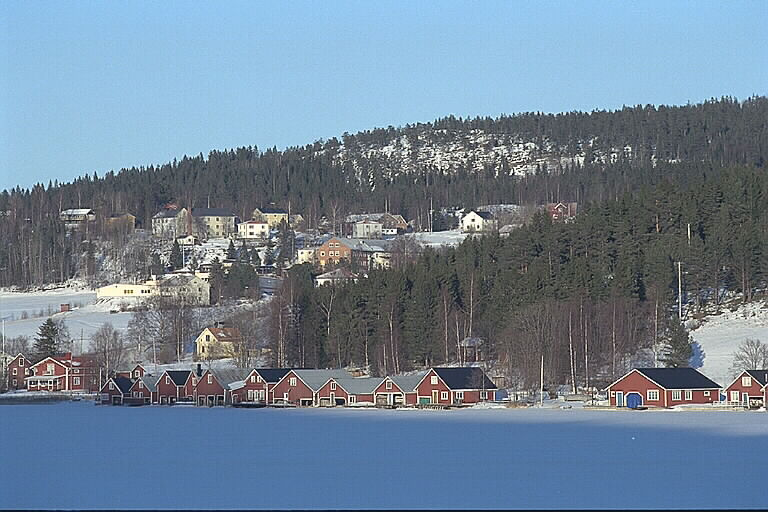
Mjällom

Mjällom is a locality situated in Kramfors Municipality, Västernorrland County, Sweden with 275 inhabitants in 2010.
