= Anne-Li Sjölund =

Swedish politician (born 1966)

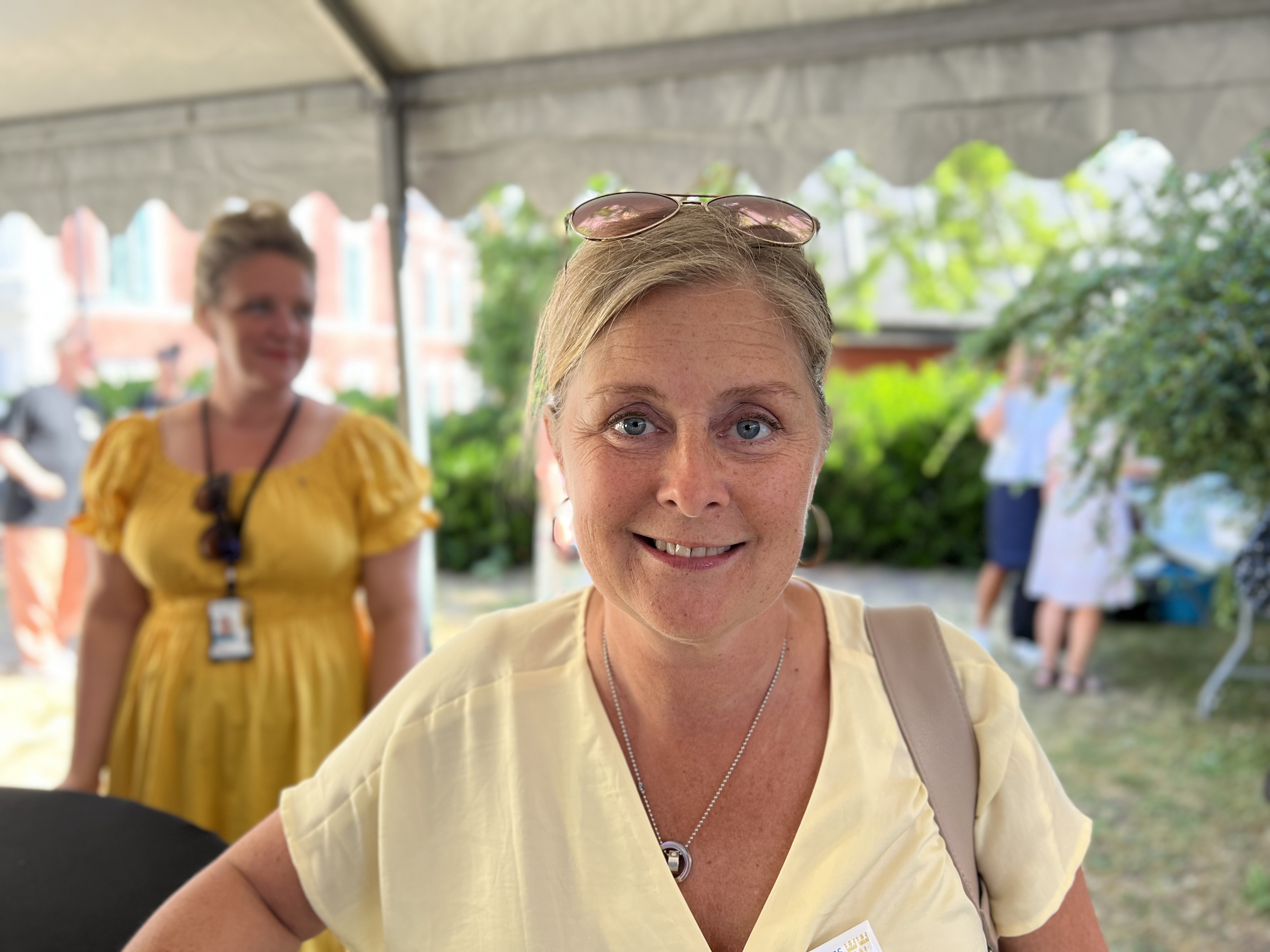

Member of the Riksdag
- Incumbent
- Assumed office 14 September 2021
- Constituency: Västernorrland County

Personal details
- Born: 1966 (age 59–60)
- Party: Centre Party

Anne-Li Sjölund (born 1966) is a Swedish politician. Since September 2021, she serves as Member of the Riksdag representing the constituency of Västernorrland County. She became a member after Emil Källström resigned.

She was also elected as Member of the Riksdag in September 2022.
