= Gudmundrå =

Gudmundrå may refer to any of a number of places in northern Sweden:

- Kramfors Municipality, formerly a rural municipality known as Gudmundrå
- Gudmundrå Court District, a court district in the former province of Ångermanland
