= Kristina Nilsson (politician) =

Swedish politician (born 1965)

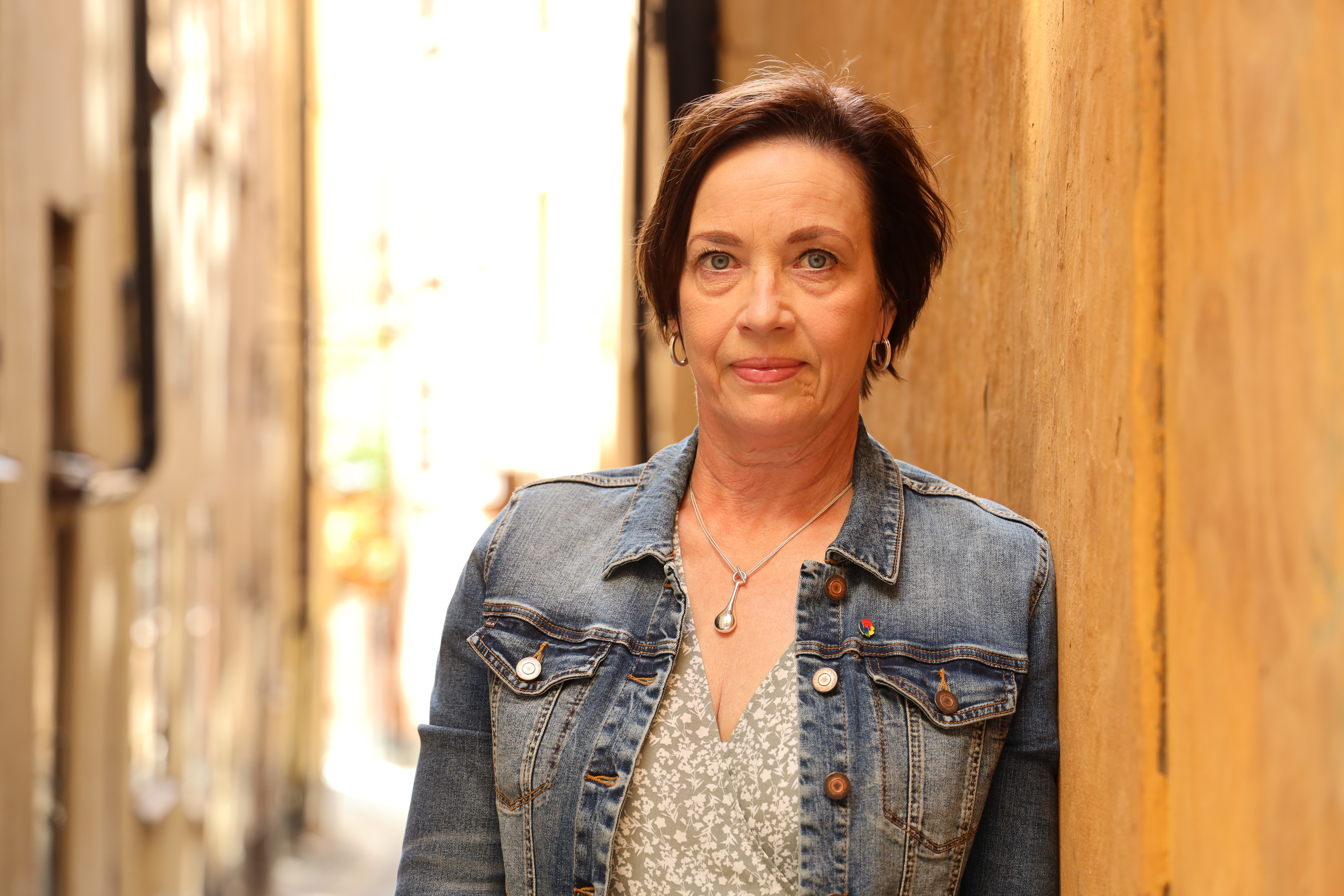
- Nilsson in 2022

Member of the Riksdag
- In office 4 October 2010 – 26 September 2022
- Constituency: Västernorrland County

Personal details
- Born: Ingrid Kristina Karlsson; 1965 (age 60–61)
- Party: Social Democratic Party

Ingrid Kristina Nilsson (née Karlsson; born 1965) is a Swedish politician and former member of the Riksdag, the national legislature. A member of the Social Democratic Party, she represented Västernorrland County between October 2010 and September 2022.

Nilsson is the daughter of factory worker Åke Karlsson and municipal worker Adéle Karlsson (née Backman). She studied nursing. She worked for the in county council in Västernorrland County. She has been a member of the municipal council in Örnsköldsvik Municipality since 2018. She had previously been a member of the municipal council from 2002 to 2015.
