= Anna-Belle Strömberg =

Swedish politician (born 1965)

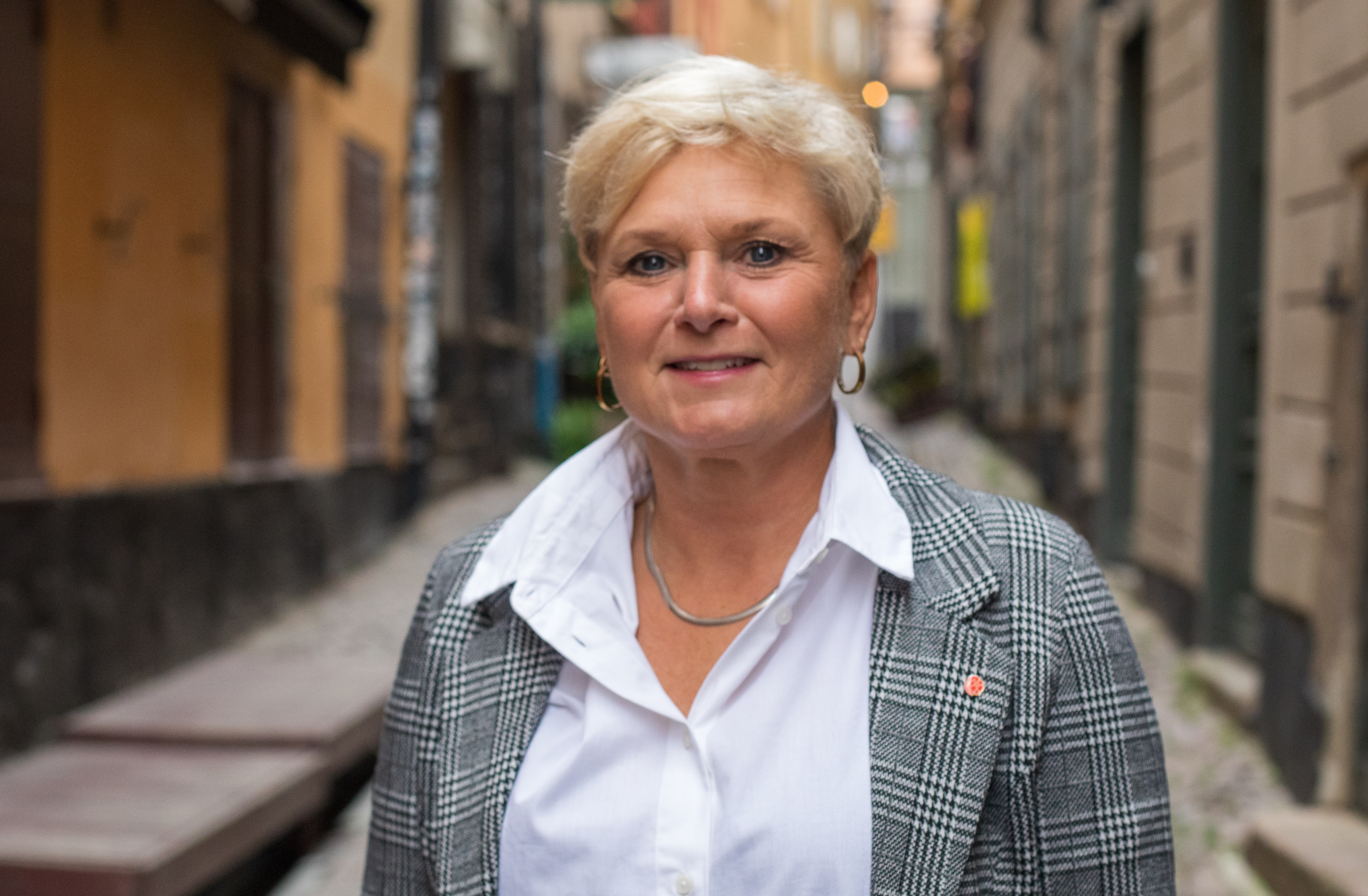
- Strömberg in 2022

Member of the Riksdag
- Incumbent
- Assumed office 16 November 2021
- Preceded by: Stefan Löfven
- Constituency: Västernorrland County

Personal details
- Born: 17 August 1965 (age 61)
- Party: Social Democratic Party

Lissi Anna-Belle Strömberg (born 17 August 1965) is a Swedish politician and member of the Riksdag, the national legislature. A member of the Social Democratic Party, she has represented Västernorrland County since November 2021. She had previously been a substitute member of the Riksdag for Stefan Löfven between September 2021 and November 2021.

Strömberg had been a member of the municipal council in Örnsköldsvik Municipality before entering the Riksdag.
