= Christina Höj Larsen =

Swedish politician (born 1971)

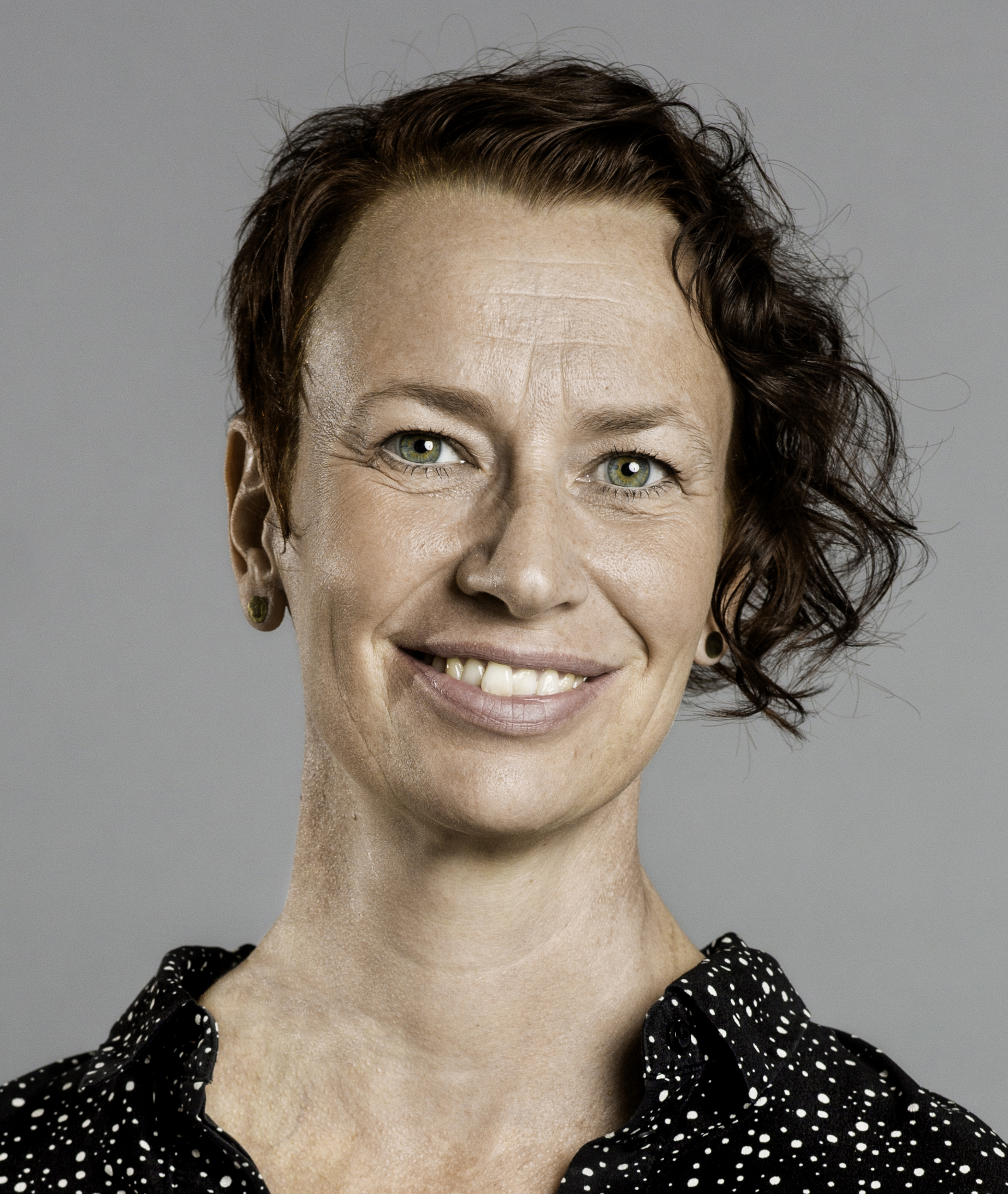
- Höj Larsen in 2018

Member of the Riksdag
- In office 4 October 2010 – 26 September 2022
- Constituency: Västernorrland County

Personal details
- Born: 1971 (age 54–55)
- Party: Left Party

Christina Höj Larsen (born 1971) is a Swedish politician and former member of the Riksdag, the national legislature. A member of the Left Party, she represented Västernorrland County between October 2010 and September 2022.

Höj Larsen is the daughter of metalworker Bjarne Larsen and medical secretary Susanne Howalt Larsen (née Höj).

She worked as a migration policy spokesperson for the Left Party.
