= Birgitta Sellén =

Swedish politician (born 1945)

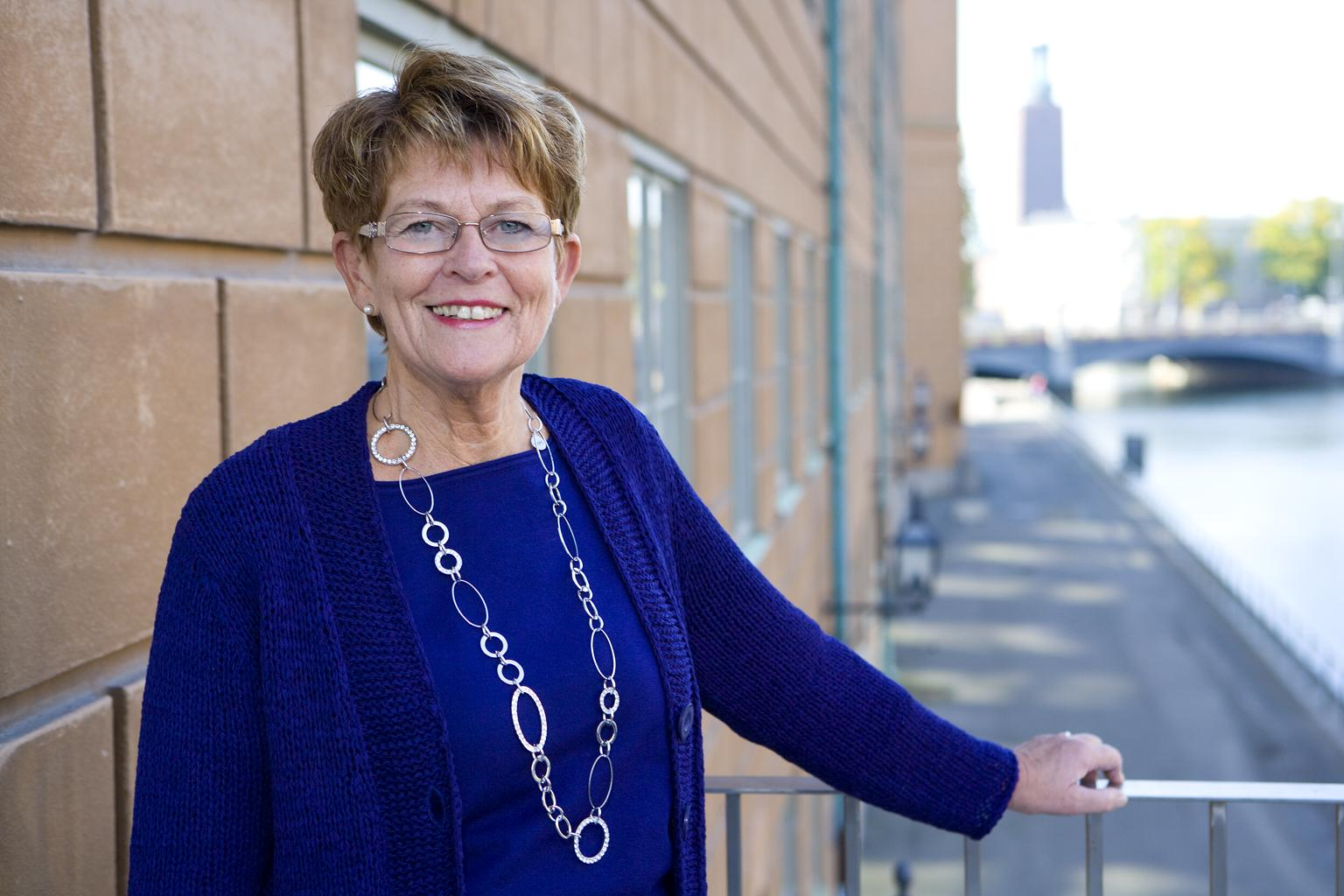

Member of the Riksdag
- In office 1998–2010
- Constituency: Västernorrland County

Personal details
- Born: March 10, 1945 (age 81)
- Occupation: junior-level teacher

Birgitta Sellén (born March 10, 1945) is a Swedish Centre Party politician. She was a member of the Riksdag between 1998 and 2010. In 2006, Sellén became Second Vice Speaker of the Riksdag.
