= Ingemar Nilsson =

Swedish politician (born 1956)

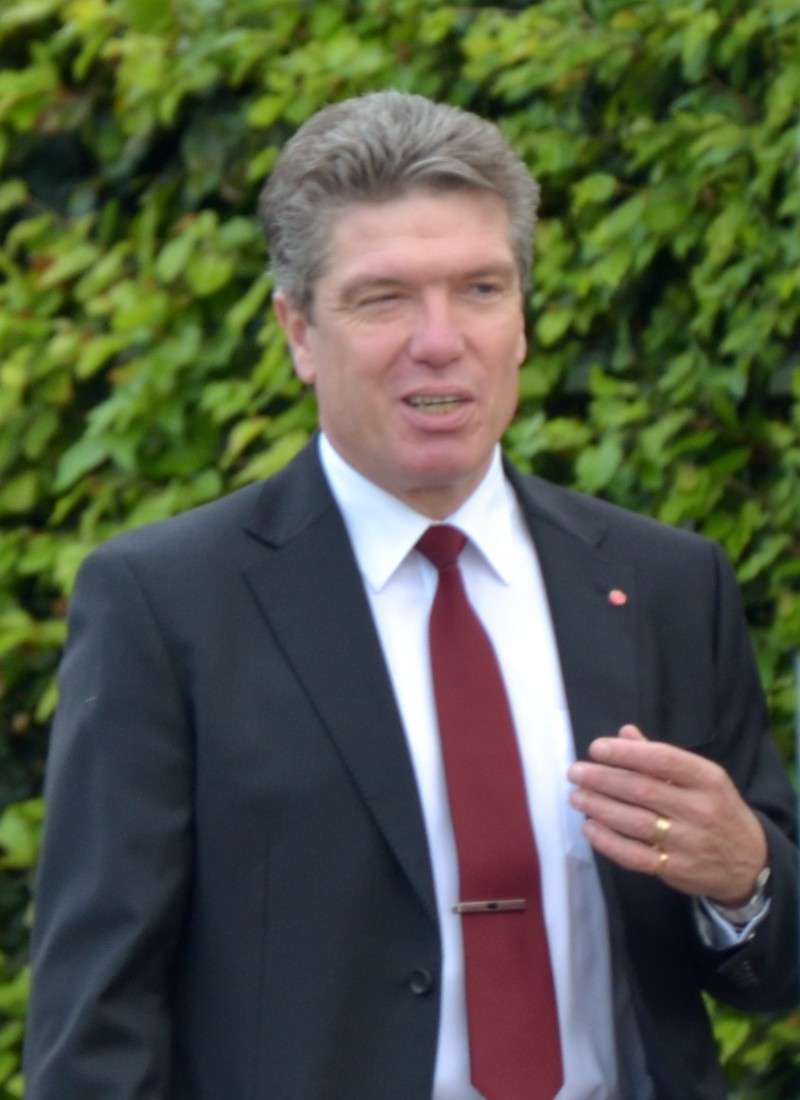
- Nilsson in September 2012

Member of the Riksdag
- In office 4 October 2010 – 31 August 2021
- Succeeded by: Jasenko Omanović
- Constituency: Västernorrland County

Personal details
- Born: 1956 (age 69–70)
- Party: Social Democratic Party

Ingemar Nilsson (born 1956) is a Swedish politician and former member of the Riksdag, the national legislature. A member of the Social Democratic Party, he represented Västernorrland County between October 2010 and August 2021.

Nilsson studied insurance for three years. He worked in a sawmill between 1972 and 1983 and for the Swedish Wood Industry Workers' Union between 1983 and 1987. He held various positions at Folksam between 1987 and 1999.
