= Isabell Mixter =

Swedish politician (born 1989)

Member of the Riksdag
- Incumbent
- Assumed office 26 September 2022
- Constituency: Västernorrland County

Personal details
- Born: 1989 (age 36–37)
- Party: Left Party

Isabell Mixter (born 1989) is a Swedish politician. She was elected as Member of the Riksdag in September 2022. She represents the constituency of Västernorrland County. She is affiliated with the Left Party.
