= Ulf Lindholm =

Swedish politician (born 1963)

Member of the Riksdag
- Incumbent
- Assumed office 26 September 2022
- Constituency: Västernorrland County

Personal details
- Born: 1963 (age 62–63)
- Party: Sweden Democrats

Ulf Lindholm (born 1963) is a Swedish politician. He was elected as Member of the Riksdag in September 2022. He represents the constituency of Västernorrland County. He is affiliated with the Sweden Democrats.
