= Jörgen Berglund =

Swedish politician (born 1974)

Member of the Riksdag
- Incumbent
- Assumed office 24 September 2018
- Constituency: Västernorrland County

Personal details
- Born: 1974 (age 51–52)
- Party: Moderate Party

Jörgen Berglund (born 1974) is a Swedish politician. Since September 2018, he serves as Member of the Riksdag representing the constituency of Västernorrland County. He was also elected as Member of the Riksdag in September 2022. He is affiliated with the Moderate Party.
