= Mats Hellhoff =

Swedish politician (born 1954)

Member of the Riksdag for Västernorrland County
- Incumbent
- Assumed office 2024
- Preceded by: David Lång

Personal details
- Born: 2 February 1954 (age 71) Sundsvall, Sweden
- Party: Sweden Democrats

Mats Hellhoff (born 2 February 1954) is a Swedish politician of the Sweden Democrats party and former police officer who has served as a member of parliament in the Riksdag since 2024.

== Biography ==
Hellhoff was born in 1954. He worked for several years as a police inspector for the Swedish National Police Board. After retiring, he became active in the Sweden Democrats in Sundsvall Municipality before being elected as a regional councilor in Västernorrland where he served as group leader for the SD.

In 2024, Hellhoff became a member of the Riksdag to replace David Lång. He takes seat 274 in parliament and serves on the Riksdag committee for civil affairs.

== See also ==
- List of members of the Riksdag, 2022–2026
