= Kevin Sahlin =

Swedish politician (born 2001)

Member of the Riksdag
- Incumbent
- Assumed office 28 September 2026
- Constituency: Västernorrland County

Personal details
- Born: 2 January 2001 (age 25)
- Party: Sweden Democrats

Kevin Alexander Ulf Sahlin (born 2 January 2001) is a Swedish politician who was elected member of the Riksdag in 2026. He has served as chairman of the Sweden Democrats in Sundsvall since 2020.
