= Emil Källström =

Swedish politician (born 1987)

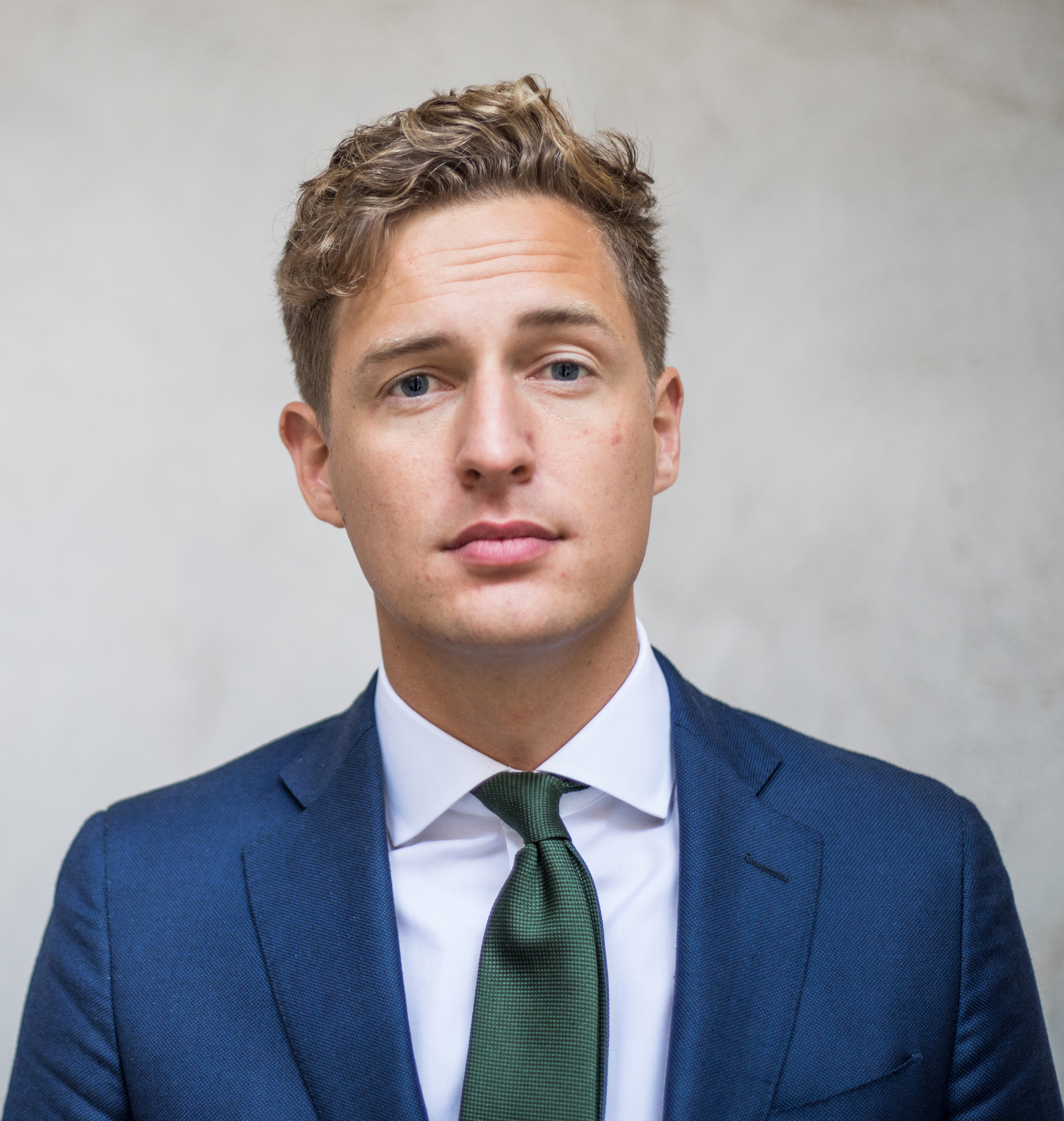
- Källström in September 2017

Member of the Swedish Parliament; for Västernorrland
- In office 2010–2021

Personal details
- Born: 23 January 1987 (age 39)
- Party: Centre Party

Emil Källström (born 23 January 1987) is a Swedish politician for the Centre Party. He represented the Västernorrland constituency and he was a member of the Riksdag from 2010 to 2021. He has frequently been featured in media because of his political career, for his looks, and also for appearing high on a list of the most influential young Swedes in 2015.

== Career ==
Emil Källström was born in Domsjö, Örnsköldsvik Municipality, Sweden, and now resides in Sund. Since the general elections in 2010, he has been a member of parliament for Centerpartiet (Sweden's Centre Party) representing Västernorrland in seat no. 347 in the Riksdag, Sweden's national legislature and supreme decision-making body. In 2006 Källström was elected city councilor of the Örnsköldsviks municipality at the age of 19. During his time in office he worked on issues concerning the future of Norrland. Källström was a candidate in the 2010 general elections for the constituency of Västernorrland and gained enough votes to remain in the Riksdag. He was also voted into the Justice, Education, and Labour Market Committees.

Along with his political work, Källström is studying to become a civil economist at the Stockholm School of Economics. He is also chairman of the Förbundet Vi Unga, an independent youth organisation for the Studieförbundet Vuxenskolan (Vuxenskolan Study Association), which works with youth to give them a chance to fulfill their dreams. In September 2015, Källström was elected to a leadership position in the Centre Party.

== Personal life ==
Källström has been named "Sweden's sexiest politician of 2014" by the news site Nyheter24. In 2015, he was the runner-up in the same magazine's countdown of Sweden's sexiest politicians, losing to Rossana Dinamarca. In 2011, Källström came in ninth on the list. In early 2016, he came in sixth in Land magazine's annual list of "Hottest hillbillys"; the winner was Princess Sofia, Duchess of Värmland. In 2015, Källström was number ten on Fokus magazine's annual list of the "Most influential young people in Sweden", also appearing on the cover of that edition of the magazine.
