= Agneta Lundberg =

Swedish politician (born 1947)

Agneta Lundberg (born 1947) is a Swedish politician of the Social Democratic Party. She was a member of the Riksdag from 1994 to 2010. She represented Västernorrland County. One of her positions in the Riksdag was as a member of the Committee on Education. Lundberg is an economist and has previously worked as a chamberlain and as a country merchant. She lives in the village of Björna in Örnsköldsvik Municipality and has two children.
