= Hans Stenberg =

Swedish politician (1953–2016)

Hans Stenberg (3 July 1953 – 27 August 2016) was a Swedish politician. He was a Social Democratic member of the Riksdag from 1991 to 2010.
