= Eva Sonidsson =

Swedish politician (born 1955)

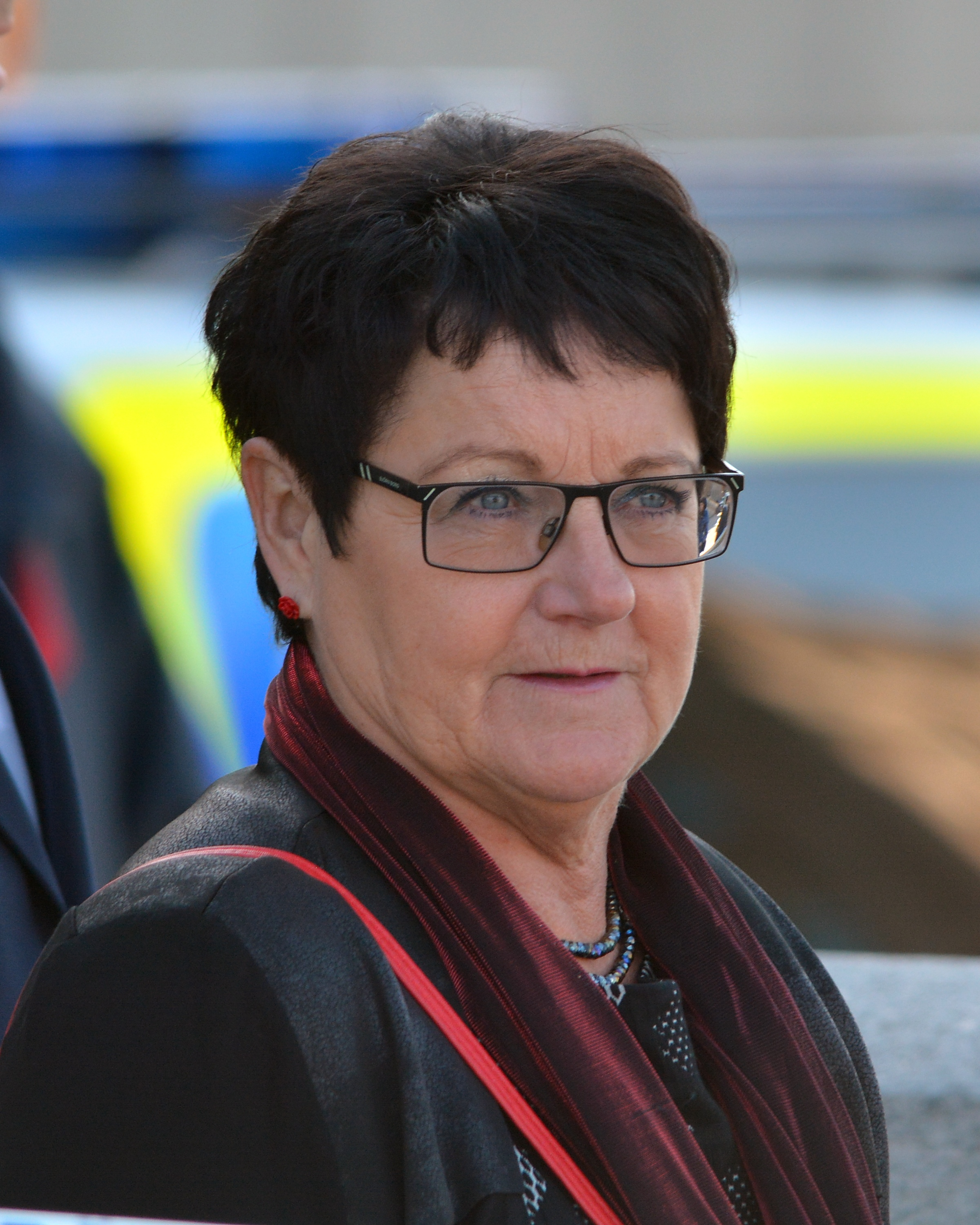
- Eva Sonidsson, Swedish politician

Member of the Sweden Parliament for Västernorrland County
- In office 2006–2018

Personal details
- Born: 1955 (age 70–71)
- Party: Social Democrats

Eva Sonidsson (born 1955) is a Swedish social democratic politician. She has been a member of the Riksdag from 2006 to 2018.
