= David Lång =

Swedish politician (born 1972)

David Lång SD

Member of the Riksdag
- In office 4 October 2010 – 10 June 2024

Secretary of the Sweden Democrats
- In office Early 2005 – 7 May 2005
- Preceded by: Jan Milld
- Succeeded by: Björn Söder

Personal details
- Born: 14 November 1972 (age 53) Nyköping's Eastern Parish, Nyköping Municipality, Södermanland County, Sweden
- Party: Sweden Democrats
- Occupation: Politician

Lars David Lång (born 14 November 1972) is a former Swedish member of the Riksdag for the Sweden Democrats from 2010 to 2024.

He has been a member of the Taxation Committee from October 2010 until January 2010 when he left the Taxation Committee to join the Social Insurance Committee in January 2012. He left the Social Insurance Committee in October 2014 and after the 2014 general election and rejoined the Taxation Committee. He is also a board member for the Sweden Democrats.

== Career ==
=== Early life ===
Lång was born in Nyköping in 1972 before to Stockholm in 1995 to pursue studies in business administration and economics. He worked as a payroll administrator for the Swedish Armed Forces but was fired from the job in 2006 due to his involvement with the Sweden Democrats.

=== Politics ===
Lång joined the Sweden Democrats in 1999. During the 2006 general election Lång was chosen to be on the twelfth place for the Sweden Democrat's ballot list. In 2009 he was chosen to be on the Diocese of Stockholm and as a substitute member for the Swedish Church meeting (Kyrkomötet (Svenska kyrkan)). Since 2014 he is a full member of the Swedish Church meeting.

Lång is also the author behind the Sweden Democrats economic planning program. He is also a host of Radio SD, the Sweden Democrats radio program, and the Sweden Democrats' voice in Stockholm's community radio. Long is considered to be one of the party's traditionalists with ideas closer to former SD chairman Mikael Jansson. Lång has said that his beliefs include limiting immigration and foreign influence over Sweden, and that he previously supported Sweden's entrance into the European Union in 1995 but has since changed his view and supports a Swedish-EU exit.

In the 2010 general election Lång campaigned for place number 20 on the Sweden Democrats ballot. He ended up being the last person to be elected since the Sweden Democrats received 20 seats in the Riksdag in the 2010 general election. He was elected and served in the Taxation Committee. He later left the Taxation Committee and later represented his party in the Social Insurance Committee after he left the Taxation Committee. He later rejoined the Taxation Committee after the 2014 general elections.

=== Ausländer raus controversy ===
In June 2024, during a post-election party following the European Parliament election, Lång was caught on tape by an Expressen journalist while singing the German anti-immigration slogan "Ausländer raus, Ausländer raus" over the song "L'amour toujours" during an interview with SD spokesperson Richard Jomshof. The journalist reported that Lång attempted to take the recording equipment after realizing he was being recorded. Jomshof then urged Lång to leave.

Following the incident, SD Riksdag leader Linda Lindberg, stated that Lång "was very tired and acted in kind of a buffoonish way", and that she "expected higher standards" from him in future occasions. Lång gave a subsequent press release in which he apologised and claimed he was unaware of the song's association to extremism, but said he would resign his seat in the Riksdag to avoid further negative publicity. He was replaced by Mats Hellhoff.
