= Gunilla Florby =

Swedish academic

Eva Gunilla Yvonne Florby (née Niwén; 1943 in Lund, Skåne County – 2011), was a Swedish academic. She grew up in Malmö and received her Ph.D. at Lund University in 1982. She was an English literature professor, first in Lund and from 2002 until her retirement in 2010 at University of Gothenburg. She is noted for her studies of the works of the Jacobean poet and playwright George Chapman.

== Bibliography ==
- The Painful Passage to Virtue: A Study of George Chapman's The Tragedy of Bussy D'Ambois and The Revenge of Bussy D'Ambois, 1982.
- Grammatiskt ABC, 1994.
- The Margin Speaks: A Study of Margaret Laurence & Robert Kroetsch From a Post-colonial Point of View, 1997
- Echoing Texts: George Chapman's Conspiracy and Tragedy of Charles Duke of Byron, 2004.
