= Lena Asplund =

Swedish politician (born 1956)

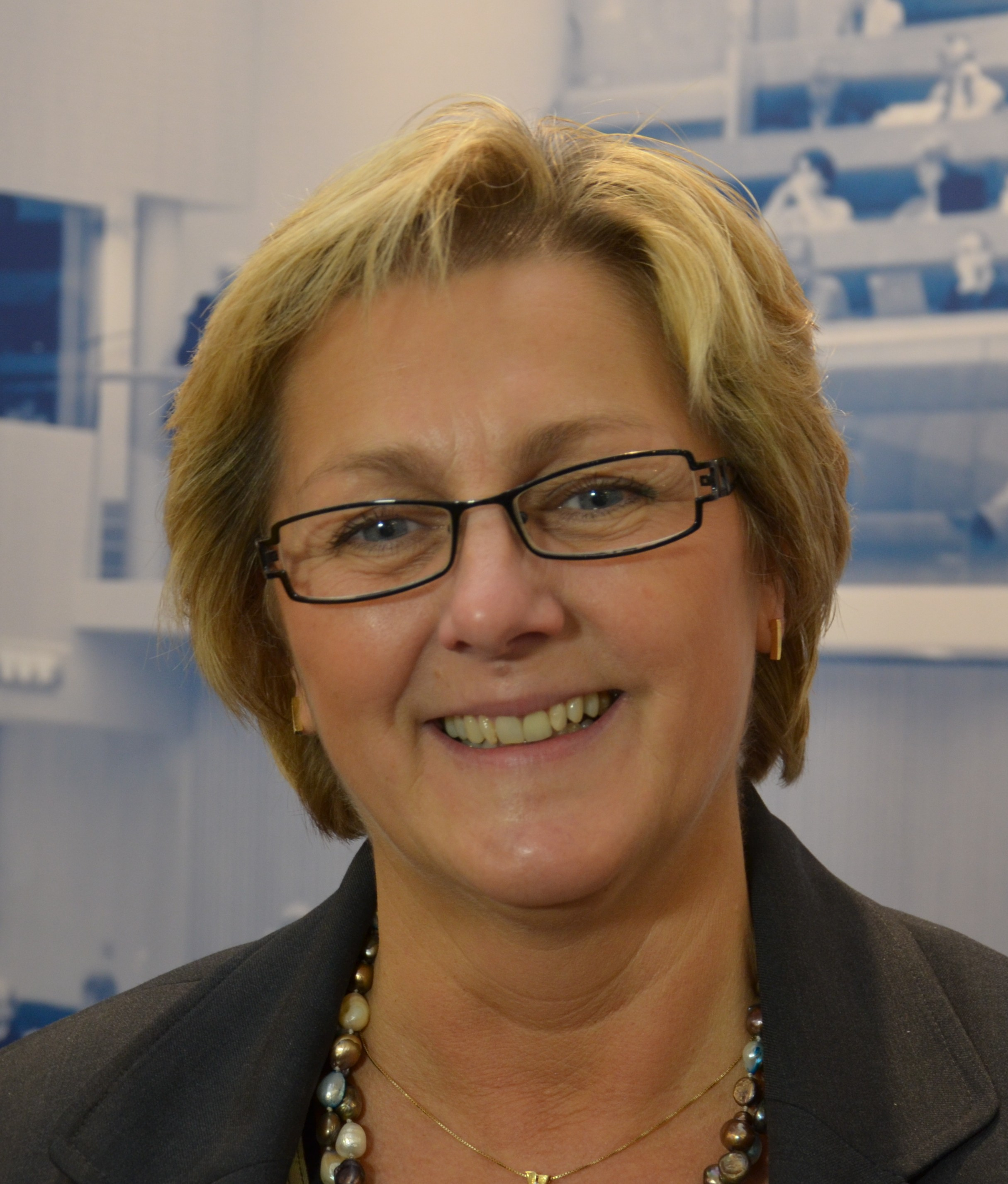
- Lena Asplund
- Born: 1956 (age 69–70)
- Occupations: Politician; biomedical analyst
- Title: Swedish Member of Parliament
- Political party: Moderate Party

Lena Asplund (born 1956) in Motala, Östergötlands County, Sweden, is a Swedish politician of the Moderate Party. She was a member of the Riksdag from 2006 to 2018. Asplund is a member of the Moderates' party board and was also previously union chairman for the Moderate Party in Västernorrland. Asplund is married with 3 children and lives in Sollefteå, Västernorrland.
