= Ullånger =

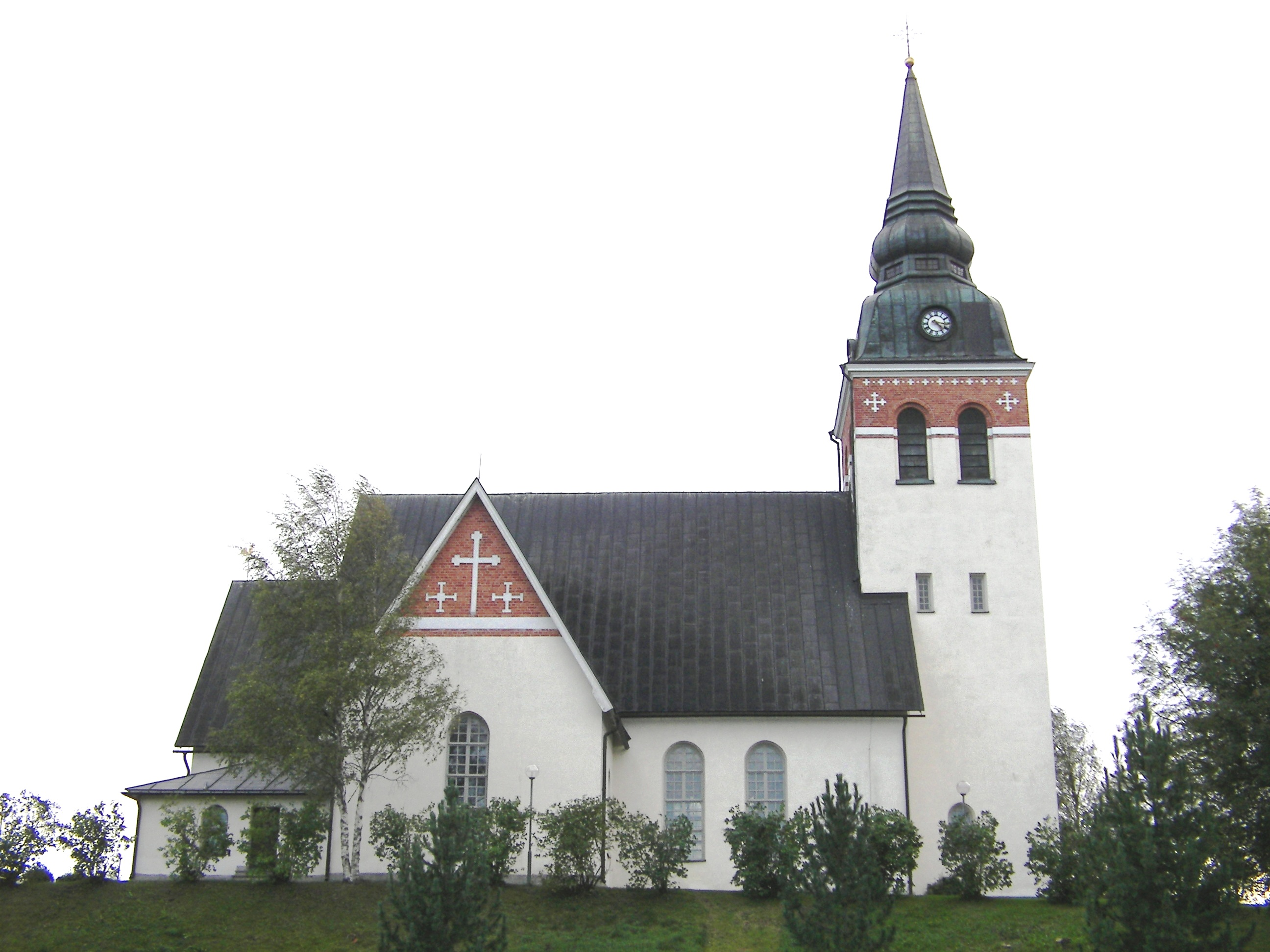
- Ullånger Church

- Location within Västernorrland Location within Sweden
- Coordinates: 63°01′N 18°11′E
- Country: Sweden
- Province: Ångermanland
- County: Västernorrland County
- Municipality: Kramfors Municipality

Area
  - Total: 0.98 km^{2} (0.38 sq mi)

Population (31 December 2010)
  - Total: 626
  - Density: 640/km^{2} (1,700/sq mi)
- Time zone: UTC+1 (CET)
  - Summer (DST): UTC+2 (CEST)
- Climate: Dfb

Ullånger (Swedish pronunciation: [ɵˈlɔ̌ŋːɛr, ˈɵ̂ˌlːɔŋːɛr]) is a locality situated in Kramfors Municipality, Västernorrland County, Sweden with 626 inhabitants in 2010.
