= Kerstin Kristiansson Karlstedt =

Swedish politician (born 1948)

Kerstin Kristiansson Karlstedt (born 1948) is a Swedish social democratic politician. She was a member of the Riksdag from 1996 to 2006.
