= Susanne Eberstein =

Swedish politician (born 1948)

member of the Riksdag
- In office 1994–2018

First Deputy Speaker of the Riksdag
- In office 2010–2014

Personal details
- Born: 1 March 1948 (age 78)
- Party: Social Democratic
- Occupation: lawyer

Susanne Eberstein (born 1 March 1948) is a Swedish Social Democratic politician. She was member of the Riksdag from 1994 to 2018 and served as First Deputy Speaker of the Riksdag from 2010 to 2014. In previous terms of office, she has held positions as chairman of the Committee on Taxation 2004–2006, vice chairman of the Committee on Justice 2002–2004 and EU Affairs 2006–2010, second vice chairman of the Committee on Health and Welfare 1998–2002, and member of the Committee of Finance 1994–1998 and the General Council of the Riksbank 1998–2010.

By profession, Eberstein is a lawyer and has served as a judge (Swedish: kammarrättsråd) of the Administrative Court of Appeals in Sundsvall. Her daughter, Anna Eberstein, married Hugh Grant in 2018.
