= Gunilla Forseth =

Norwegian footballer (born 1985)

Personal information
- Date of birth: 7 June 1985 (age 41)
- Position: Forward

Team information
- Current team: Melhus
- Number: 18

Youth career
- Leinstrand, Kattem/Leinstrand

Senior career*
Years	Team	Apps	(Gls)
2001-2003	Kongsvinger		
2004	Nittedal		
2005	Kattem		
2006-2011	Trondheims-Ørn		
2012	Kattem		
2013	Heimdal		
2020-	Melhus		

International career^{‡}
2006	Norway	1	(0)
- * Club domestic league appearances and goals ‡ National team caps and goals as of 19 December 2007

Gunilla Forseth (born 7 June 1985) is a Norwegian football striker. She plays for Melhus IL, located in Melhus Municipality, just south of Trondheim Municipality.

Forseth started her career at Leinstrand IL before transferring to Kattem IL, becoming the club's top scorer in 2005 and being nominated Young Player of the Year in the Toppserien. When Kattem was relegated to division-1 at the end of 2005 Forseth transferred to Trondheims-Ørn.

After six seasons at Trondheims-Ørn, during which she played 126 matches and scored 22 goals, Forseth transferred back to Kattem at the start of 2012.

Forseth played one match for Norway in January 2006, a 2–1 defeat by China at the Four Nations Tournament.
