= Gunilla Wahlén =

Swedish politician (born 1951)

Gunilla Wahlén (born 1951) is a Swedish Left Party politician. She was a member of the Riksdag from 1998 to 2010.
