= Göran Norlander =

Swedish politician (born 1945)

Göran Norlander (born 1945) is a Swedish social democratic politician, member of the Riksdag 1998–2006.
