= Lars Lindén =

Swedish politician (born 1945)

Lars Lindén (born 1945) is a Swedish Christian democratic politician, member of the Riksdag from 2002 to 2009.
