= Municipal council (Sweden) =

Type of local governing body in Sweden

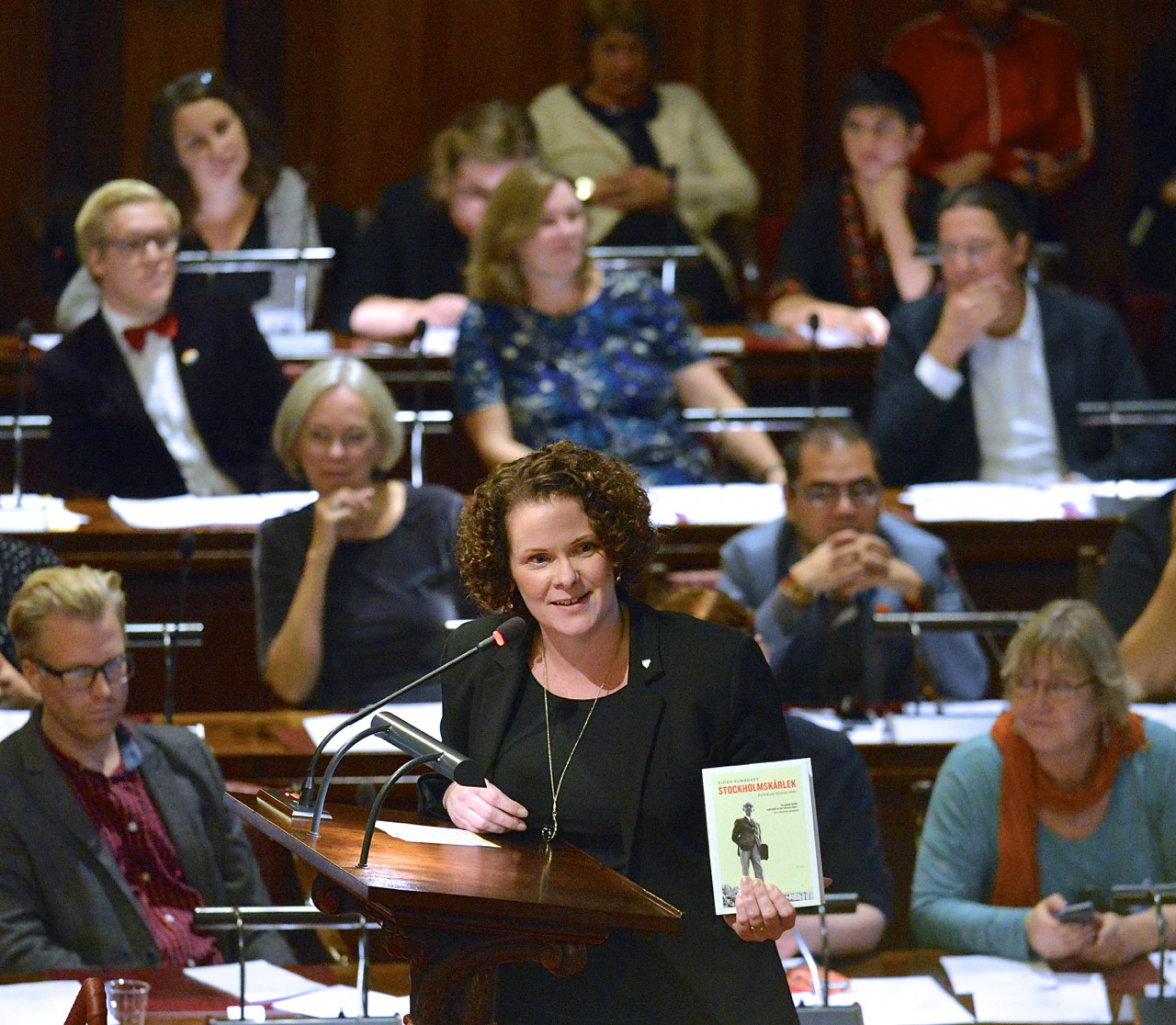
Stockholm municipality council in October 2014.

A municipal council (Swedish: Kommunfullmäktige) is the decision-making body governing each of the 290 municipalities of Sweden. Though the Swedish Local Government Act (Swedish: Kommunallagen) uses the term "municipal assembly" in an English translation of the Act, "municipal council" and even "city council" are used as well, even in official contexts in English by several of Sweden's largest municipalities, including Stockholm, Malmö, and Gothenburg.

This system of administrative division was established with the municipal reform of 1971. Prior to this reform, municipal governance in Sweden was conducted by either a kommunalfullmäktige (municipal council in rural areas) or a stadsfullmäktige (city council in urban areas).

The number of members in each assembly can range from 21 to 101, depending on the population of the municipality in question. Members of the assemblies are chosen to serve for four-year terms through elections using a party-list proportional representation system. These municipal elections are held on the second Sunday of September, the same day as Swedish parliamentary elections.

The term kommunfullmäktige is also used by Swedish-speakers in Finland, where it corresponds to the kunnanvaltuusto with the same meaning.
