= Kramfors Municipality =

Kramfors Municipality Kramfors kommun
- Municipality
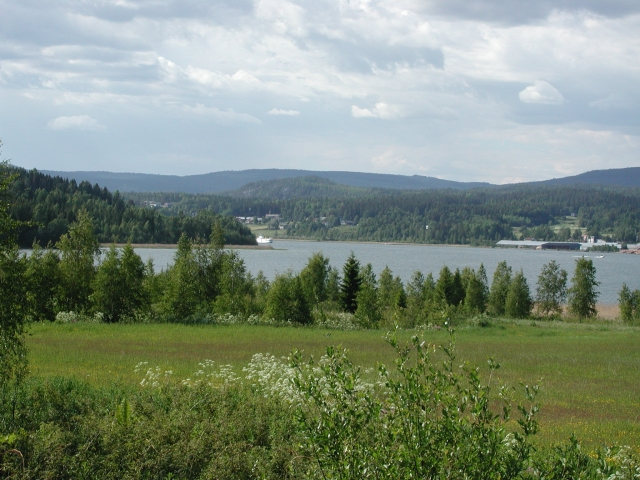
- Röviken Gulf in Ullånger, Kramfors, along the High Coast

- Coat of arms

- Coordinates: 62°56′N 17°48′E
- Country: Sweden
- County: Västernorrland County
- Seat: Kramfors

Area
  - Total: 2,892.59 km^{2} (1,116.84 sq mi)
  - Land: 1,694.76 km^{2} (654.35 sq mi)
  - Water: 1,197.83 km^{2} (462.48 sq mi)
- Area as of 1 January 2014.

Population (30 June 2025)
  - Total: 17,428
  - Density: 10.283/km^{2} (26.634/sq mi)
- Time zone: UTC+1 (CET)
  - Summer (DST): UTC+2 (CEST)
- ISO 3166 code: SE
- Province: Ångermanland
- Municipal code: 2282
- Website: http://www.kramfors.se

Kramfors Municipality (Swedish: Kramfors kommun) is a municipality in Västernorrland County, northern Sweden. Its seat is located in the town Kramfors.

The rural municipality of Gudmundrå was in 1947 made one of the last administrative cities of Sweden and got the name Kramfors from an industrial settlement. In 1952 many of the surrounding entities were grouped into larger municipalities. The nationwide reform in 1971 made Kramfors a unitary municipality, but the amalgamation process was not fulfilled until 1974. The number of original units within the present municipality is eleven, including Bjärtrå.

The municipality features the Sandö Bridge, crossing the Ångerman River. It is a concrete bridge in one span, and with a length of 264 meters it was the longest of that kind from its inauguration 1943 to 1964.

Nearby is a monument to the people killed in the Ådalen shootings, 1931, when the Swedish military shot socialist demonstrators, killing five.

The UNESCO World Heritage Area Höga kusten ("High coast" in English) is located on the east coast of Kramfors municipality.

== Demographics ==
This is a demographic table based on Kramfors Municipality's electoral districts in the 2022 Swedish general election sourced from SVT's election platform, in turn taken from SCB official statistics.

In total there were 17,991 residents, including 14,021 Swedish citizens of voting age. 61.0% voted for the left coalition and 37.6% for the right coalition. Indicators are in percentage points except population totals and income.

Location	Residents	Citizen adults	Left vote	Right vote	Employed	Swedish parents	Foreign heritage	Income SEK	Degree
Location			%	%					
Bjärtrå	1,334	1,054	61.5	37.1	73	86	14	22,649	25
Björsta	1,546	1,159	62.8	35.4	73	75	25	21,647	26
Blästa	1,335	1,039	57.1	41.4	75	87	13	23,275	22
Bollsta	1,359	1,045	56.6	42.6	72	84	16	21,481	20
Centrum	1,665	1,303	68.4	30.0	74	73	27	20,052	27
Docksta	825	677	59.3	38.3	81	92	8	23,581	34
Frånö-Lunde	1,248	982	60.5	38.3	71	87	13	21,510	25
Gumås	1,789	1,351	62.5	37.0	86	89	11	27,951	35
Nora-Skog	1,570	1,250	61.3	37.5	79	89	11	23,690	33
Nordingrå	1,239	1,037	63.5	35.4	82	89	11	22,967	40
Nyland	1,475	1,242	55.3	42.9	74	90	10	21,355	25
Ullånger	1,143	879	60.3	38.4	83	86	14	22,882	29
Östby	1,463	1,003	63.8	35.0	70	74	26	20,412	22
Source: SVT
