= Hanna Westerén =

Politician and Member of the parliament of Sweden

Hanna Westerén S
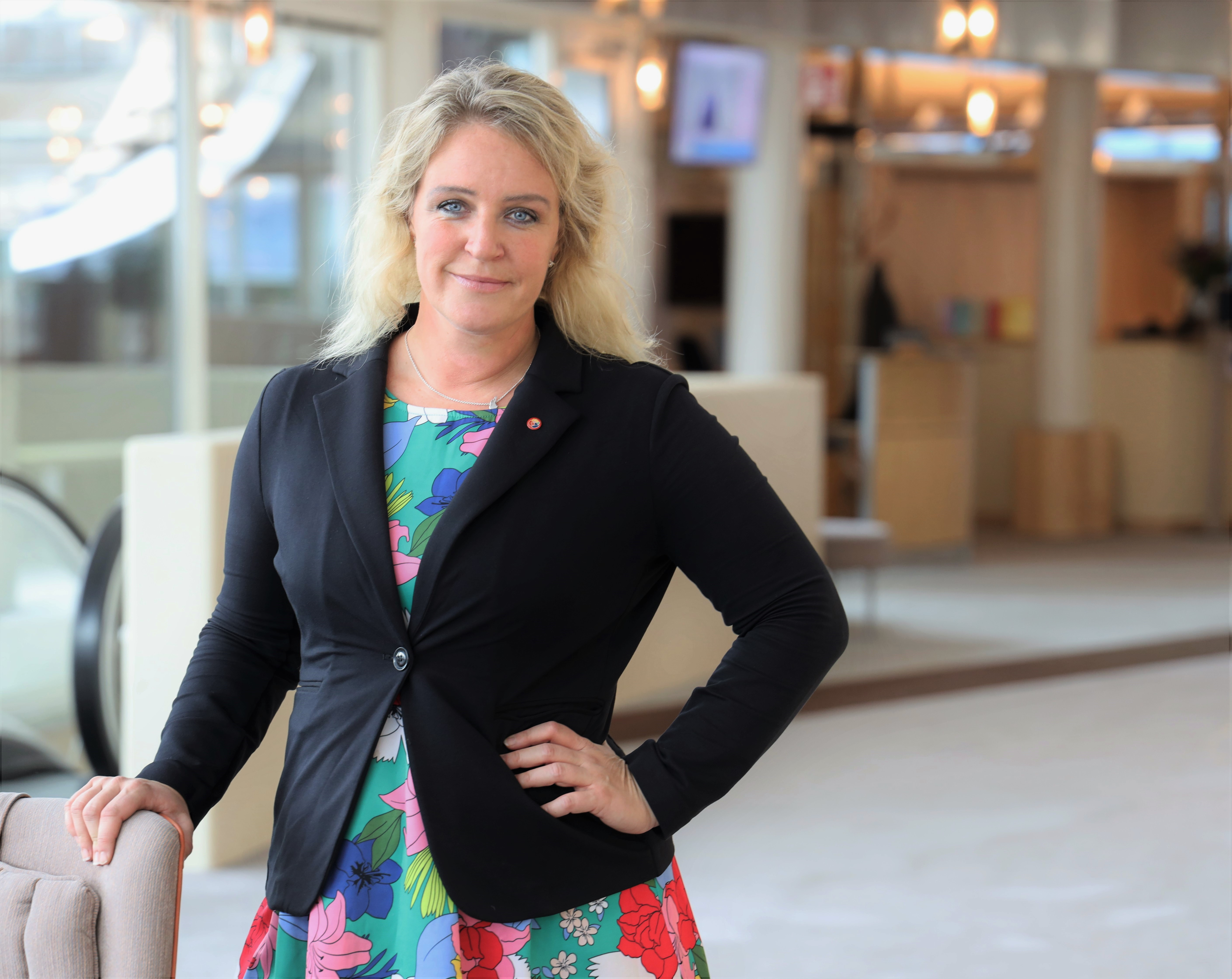
- Hanna Westerén's official portrait Picture: Sveriges riksdag

Member of the Swedish Parliament for Gotland County
- Incumbent
- Assumed office 1 February 2015
- Preceded by: Christer Engelhardt

Personal details
- Born: 23 September 1981 (age 45)
- Party: Swedish Social Democratic Party
- Parents: Gunder Nyman; Inga-Maj Nyman (née Samuelsson)
- Education: Campus Gotland
- Profession: Politician

Hanna Carolina Westerén (born 23 September 1981) is a Swedish politician and member of the Riksdag for the Swedish Social Democratic Party. She is currently taking up seat number 13 in the Riksdag for the constituency of Gotland County. Since 2018 she has been a member of the Committee on Environment and Agriculture.

Westerén lives in Länna, in Visby and she has been politically engaged since the early 2000s. She had previously worked for the Swedish Social Insurance Agency but has been a full-time politician since 2010. She has had a seat at Gotland's Regional Council, and since 1 February 2015 she took over the work from Christer Engelhardt as a member of parliament. Since 2018 she is the group leader for the Social Democrats in the Committee on Environment and Agriculture. During April 2018 until September 2018 she was a member of the Committee on Industry and Trade. She joined the War Delegation in October 2018.

Between July 2018 and October 2019, she was on parental leave and her replacement, David Lindvall, took over during that time.
