= Results of the 1948 Swedish general election =

Sweden held a general election on 19 September 1948. This was the country's first election since the dissolution of the wartime unity government in 1945, which had consisted of the Social Democrats and all three centre-right parties. The election resulted in the Social Democrats maintaining their 46% share of the vote, securing their position in government. Meanwhile, the centre-right parties made gains at the expense of the Communists, who suffered a significant decline in the overall vote. The People's Party achieved the largest gains of any party, becoming the largest opposition party.

== Results ==
Party	Votes	%	Seats	+/–
Swedish Social Democratic Party	1,789,459	46.13	112	–3
People's Party	882,437	22.75	57	+31
Farmers' League	480,421	12.39	30	–5
National Organisation of the Right	478,786	12.34	23	–16
Communist Party	244,826	6.31	8	–7
Left Socialist Party	2,943	0.08	0	0
Other parties	119	0.00	0	0
Total	3,878,991	100.00	230	0
Valid votes	3,878,991	99.58		
Invalid/blank votes	16,170	0.42		
Total votes	3,895,161	100.00		
Registered voters/turnout	4,707,783	82.74		
Source: Nohlen & Stöver, SCB

== Regional results ==
=== Percentage share ===
Location	Share	Votes	S	FP	B	H	K	Other	Left	Right
Götaland	48.7	1,889,877	44.2	21.7	15.4	14.2	4.5	0.1	48.7	51.2
Svealand	35.7	1,382,932	47.0	26.3	8.0	11.5	7.2	0.0	54.2	45.8
Norrland	15.6	606,182	50.4	18.1	13.0	8.5	9.9	0.0	60.3	39.7
Total	100.0	3,878,991	46.1	22.7	12.4	12.3	6.3	0.1	52.4	47.5
Source: SCB

=== By votes ===
Location	Share	Votes	S	FP	B	H	K	Other	Left	Right
Götaland	48.7	1,889,877	834,549	409,273	290,754	267,558	85,045	2,698	919,594	967,585
Svealand	35.7	1,382,932	649,518	363,378	110,703	159,343	99,640	350	749,158	633,424
Norrland	15.6	606,182	305,392	109,786	78,964	51,885	60,141	14	365,533	240,635
Total	100.0	3,878,991	1,789,459	882,437	480,421	478,786	244,826	3,062	2,034,285	1,841,644
Source: SCB

== Constituency results ==
=== Percentage share ===
Location	Land	Share	Votes	S	FP	B	H	K	Other	Left	Right	Margin
Location		%		%	%	%	%	%	%	%	%	
Blekinge	G	2.0	76,934	48.3	24.0	11.3	11.7	4.7	0.0	53.0	47.0	4,687
Bohuslän	G	2.8	107,523	39.1	30.6	12.5	13.1	4.7	0.0	43.9	56.1	13,167
Gothenburg	G	5.1	199,294	38.0	34.5	0.0	11.0	15.3	1.2	53.3	45.5	15,375
Gotland	G	0.8	31,917	35.2	19.0	30.5	14.7	0.6	0.0	35.8	64.2	9,067
Gävleborg	N	3.9	151,753	52.7	17.6	12.9	6.3	10.5	0.0	63.2	36.8	39,964
Halland	G	2.3	90,557	38.5	14.8	30.2	13.5	3.0	0.0	41.5	58.5	15,367
Jämtland	N	1.9	73,977	51.4	18.1	16.8	9.8	3.9	0.0	55.4	44.6	7,954
Jönköping	G	3.9	152,296	41.0	25.9	18.8	11.4	2.9	0.0	43.8	56.2	18,769
Kalmar	G	3.3	127,410	44.2	12.5	22.5	17.4	3.4	0.0	47.6	52.4	6,137
Kopparberg	S	3.7	143,228	51.9	20.9	14.4	6.9	5.9	0.0	57.7	42.3	22,126
Kristianstad	G	3.7	142,784	42.9	24.3	19.6	11.5	1.7	0.0	44.6	55.4	15,410
Kronoberg	G	2.2	85,299	39.4	14.2	24.9	17.0	4.5	0.0	43.9	56.1	10,414
Malmö area	G	4.9	189,815	57.0	18.8	1.0	19.9	3.3	0.0	60.3	39.7	39,047
Malmöhus	G	3.9	152,040	50.0	16.4	23.1	9.0	0.6	0.0	50.5	49.4	1,678
Norrbotten	N	2.8	109,213	48.6	10.7	8.8	10.5	21.4	0.0	70.0	30.0	43,774
Skaraborg	G	3.6	139,460	34.9	24.1	21.7	16.2	3.0	0.1	37.9	62.0	33,585
Stockholm	S	11.2	432,759	38.2	34.5	0.8	16.9	9.6	0.0	47.8	52.2	19,188
Stockholm County	S	5.0	194,150	45.0	27.7	7.0	12.2	8.0	0.1	53.0	46.9	11,748
Södermanland	S	3.2	123,448	55.1	22.4	12.0	8.0	2.5	0.0	57.6	42.4	18,760
Uppsala	S	2.2	84,614	49.2	23.0	13.8	10.8	3.2	0.0	52.4	47.6	4,144
Värmland	S	4.0	156,445	50.1	20.3	12.2	9.0	8.4	0.0	58.5	41.5	26,544
Västerbotten	N	3.0	117,930	45.4	28.0	13.1	10.5	3.0	0.0	48.4	51.6	3,718
Västernorrland	N	4.0	153,309	52.7	16.3	14.4	7.3	9.3	0.0	62.0	38.0	36,924
Västmanland	S	2.8	108,138	55.9	17.6	12.7	7.6	6.2	0.0	62.1	37.9	26,086
Älvsborg N	G	2.7	104,961	40.5	25.2	19.3	10.9	4.1	0.0	44.6	55.4	11,402
Älvsborg S	G	2.4	92,846	41.5	16.5	15.5	22.8	3.7	0.0	45.2	54.8	8,937
Örebro	S	3.6	140,150	52.8	23.0	9.7	8.2	6.3	0.0	59.1	40.9	25,514
Östergötland	G	5.1	196,741	53.8	16.1	11.8	13.6	4.7	0.0	58.5	41.5	33,477
Total		100.0	3,878,991	46.1	22.7	12.4	12.3	6.3	0.1	52.4	47.5	192,641
Source: SCB

=== By votes ===
Location	Land	Share	Votes	S	FP	B	H	K	Other	Left	Right	Margin
Location		%										
Blekinge	G	2.0	76,934	37,185	18,435	8,677	9,009	3,623	5	40,808	36,121	4,687
Bohuslän	G	2.8	107,523	42,088	32,859	13,441	14,044	5,089	2	47,177	60,344	13,167
Gothenburg	G	5.1	199,294	75,719	68,737		22,034	30,427	2,377	106,146	90,771	15,375
Gotland	G	0.8	31,917	11,250	6,069	9,745	4,678	175		11,425	20,492	9,067
Gävleborg	N	3.9	151,753	79,886	26,772	19,564	9,557	15,971	3	95,857	55,893	39,964
Halland	G	2.3	90,557	34,836	13,385	27,344	12,205	2,731	56	37,567	52,934	15,367
Jämtland	N	1.9	73,977	38,050	13,404	12,390	7,217	2,915	1	40,965	33,011	7,954
Jönköping	G	3.9	152,296	62,384	39,494	28,639	17,399	4,379	1	66,763	85,532	18,769
Kalmar	G	3.3	127,410	56,295	15,946	28,639	22,187	4,340	3	60,635	66,772	6,137
Kopparberg	S	3.7	143,228	74,260	29,951	20,685	9,915	8,417		82,677	60,551	22,126
Kristianstad	G	3.7	142,784	61,296	34,635	27,971	16,490	2,390	2	63,686	79,096	15,410
Kronoberg	G	2.2	85,299	33,634	12,096	21,211	14,549	3,808	1	37,442	47,856	10,414
Malmö area	G	4.9	189,815	108,248	35,569	1,942	37,841	6,151	64	114,399	75,352	39,047
Malmöhus	G	3.9	152,040	75,959	24,967	35,072	15,130	888	24	76,847	75,169	1,678
Norrbotten	N	2.8	109,213	53,103	11,702	9,536	11,478	23,387	7	76,490	32,716	43,774
Skaraborg	G	3.6	139,460	48,741	33,642	30,242	22,562	4,120	153	52,861	86,446	33,585
Stockholm	S	11.2	432,759	165,355	149,492	3,293	73,090	41,332	197	206,687	225,875	19,188
Stockholm County	S	5.0	194,150	87,427	53,840	13,665	23,626	15,452	140	102,879	91,131	11,748
Södermanland	S	3.2	123,448	68,029	27,604	14,884	9,855	3,074	2	71,103	52,343	18,760
Uppsala	S	2.2	84,614	41,664	19,441	11,692	9,102	2,715		44,379	40,235	4,144
Värmland	S	4.0	156,445	78,301	31,795	19,125	14,030	13,193	1	91,494	64,950	26,544
Västerbotten	N	3.0	117,930	53,581	32,957	15,443	12,423	3,524	2	57,105	60,823	3,718
Västernorrland	N	4.0	153,309	80,772	24,951	22,031	11,210	14,344	1	95,116	58,192	36,924
Västmanland	S	2.8	108,138	60,461	19,056	13,716	8,254	6,651		67,112	41,026	26,086
Älvsborg N	G	2.7	104,961	42,516	26,495	20,201	11,484	4,262	3	46,778	58,180	11,402
Älvsborg S	G	2.4	92,846	38,556	15,313	14,374	21,204	3,398	1	41,954	50,891	8,937
Örebro	S	3.6	140,150	74,021	32,199	13,643	11,471	8,806	10	82,827	57,313	25,514
Östergötland	G	5.1	196,741	105,842	31,631	23,256	26,742	9,264	6	115,106	81,629	33,477
Total		100.0	3,878,991	1,789,459	882,437	480,421	478,786	244,826	3,062	2,034,285	1,841,644	192,641
Source: SCB

== 1944–1948 bloc comparison ==
=== Percentage share ===
Constituency	Land	Votes 1944	Left 1944	Right 1944	Win 1944	Votes 1948	Left 1948	Right 1948	Win 1948	Change
Constituency			%	%	%		%	%	%	%
Blekinge	G	62,346	55.88	43.81	12.07	76,934	53.04	46.95	6.09	5.98
Bohuslän	G	88,500	50.06	49.54	0.52	107,523	43.88	56.12	12.24	12.76
Gothenburg	G	146,756	64.13	32.75	31.38	199,294	53.26	45.55	7.71	23.67
Gotland	G	27,434	37.19	62.81	25.62	31,917	35.80	64.20	28.40	2.78
Gävleborg	N	121,569	66.54	33.35	33.19	151,753	63.17	36.83	26.34	6.85
Halland	G	72,405	43.88	55.96	12.08	90,557	41.48	58.45	16.97	4.89
Jämtland	N	58,172	57.24	42.75	14.49	73,977	55.38	44.62	10.76	3.73
Jönköping	G	122,475	45.60	54.29	8.69	152,296	43.84	56.16	12.32	3.63
Kalmar	G	106,125	50.26	49.73	0.53	127,410	47.59	52.41	4.82	5.35
Kopparberg	S	113,956	60.97	38.21	22.76	143,228	57.72	42.28	15.44	7.32
Kristianstad	G	114,145	49.46	49.71	0.25	142,784	44.60	55.40	10.80	10.55
Kronoberg	G	69,587	46.39	53.60	7.21	85,299	43.90	56.10	12.20	4.99
Malmö area	G	151,329	67.34	31.72	35.62	189,815	60.27	39.70	20.57	15.05
Malmöhus	G	133,140	55.28	44.50	10.78	152,040	50.54	49.44	1.10	9.68
Norrbotten	N	86,705	70.38	29.10	41.28	109,213	70.04	29.96	40.08	1.20
Skaraborg	G	109,199	41.67	58.19	16.52	139,460	37.90	61.99	24.09	7.57
Stockholm	S	339,558	56.95	39.71	17.24	432,759	47.76	52.19	4.43	21.67
Stockholm County	S	143,994	60.83	38.53	22.30	194,150	52.99	46.94	6.05	16.25
Södermanland	S	101,301	60.31	39.68	20.63	123,448	57.60	42.40	15.20	5.43
Uppsala	S	64,406	54.91	44.89	10.02	84,614	52.45	47.55	4.90	5.12
Värmland	S	125,734	62.97	36.73	26.24	156,445	58.48	41.52	16.96	9.28
Västerbotten	N	92,446	48.02	51.97	3.95	117,930	48.42	51.58	3.16	0.79
Västernorrland	N	124,452	64.10	35.71	28.39	153,309	62.04	37.96	24.08	4.31
Västmanland	S	83,858	63.92	36.07	27.85	108,138	62.06	37.94	24.12	3.73
Älvsborg N	G	80,768	48.47	51.52	3.05	104,961	44.57	55.43	10.86	7.81
Älvsborg S	G	73,755	47.17	52.61	5.44	92,846	45.19	54.81	9.62	4.18
Örebro	S	110,352	62.26	37.73	24.53	140,150	59.10	40.89	18.21	6.32
Östergötland	G	161,837	61.27	38.71	22.56	196,741	58.51	41.49	17.02	5.54
Total		3,086,304	56.87	42.39	14.48	3,878,991	52.44	47.47	4.97	9.51
Source: SCB

=== By votes ===
Constituency	Land	Votes 1944	Left 1944	Right 1944	Win 1944	Votes 1948	Left 1948	Right 1948	Win 1948	Change
Constituency	#									
Blekinge	G	62,346	34,839	27,316	7,523	76,934	40,808	36,121	4,687	2,836
Bohuslän	G	88,500	44,306	43,844	462	107,523	47,177	60,344	13,167	13,629
Gothenburg	G	146,756	94,109	48,066	46,043	199,294	106,146	90,771	15,375	30,668
Gotland	G	27,434	10,204	17,230	7,026	31,917	11,425	20,492	9,067	2,041
Gävleborg	N	121,569	80,890	40,538	40,352	151,753	95,857	55,893	39,964	388
Halland	G	72,405	31,769	40,518	8,749	90,557	37,567	52,934	15,367	6,618
Jämtland	N	58,172	33,298	24,870	8,428	73,977	40,965	33,011	7,954	474
Jönköping	G	122,475	55,843	66,494	10,651	152,296	66,763	85,532	18,769	8,118
Kalmar	G	106,125	53,342	52,771	571	127,410	60,635	66,772	6,137	6,708
Kopparberg	S	113,956	69,476	43,540	25,936	143,228	82,677	60,551	22,126	3,810
Kristianstad	G	114,145	56,460	56,747	287	142,784	63,686	79,096	15,410	15,123
Kronoberg	G	69,587	32,279	37,299	5,020	85,299	37,442	47,856	10,414	5,394
Malmö area	G	151,329	101,900	47,996	53,904	189,815	114,399	75,352	39,047	14,857
Malmöhus	G	133,140	73,600	59,243	14,357	152,040	76,847	75,169	1,678	12,679
Norrbotten	N	86,705	61,027	25,228	35,799	109,213	76,490	32,716	43,774	7,975
Skaraborg	G	109,199	45,506	63,541	18,035	139,460	52,861	86,446	33,585	15,550
Stockholm	S	339,558	193,387	134,837	58,550	432,759	206,687	225,875	19,188	77,738
Stockholm County	S	143,994	87,597	55,482	32,115	194,150	102,879	91,131	11,748	20,367
Södermanland	S	101,301	61,097	40,200	20,897	123,448	71,103	52,343	18,760	2,137
Uppsala	S	64,406	35,365	28,913	6,452	84,614	44,379	40,235	4,144	2,308
Värmland	S	125,734	79,171	46,187	32,984	156,445	91,494	64,950	26,544	6,440
Västerbotten	N	92,446	44,392	48,048	3,656	117,930	57,105	60,823	3,718	62
Västernorrland	N	124,452	79,779	44,445	35,334	153,309	95,116	58,192	36,924	1,590
Västmanland	S	83,858	53,600	30,249	23,351	108,138	67,112	41,026	26,086	2,735
Älvsborg N	G	80,768	39,148	41,614	2,466	104,961	46,778	58,180	11,402	8,936
Älvsborg S	G	73,755	34,791	38,802	4,011	92,846	41,954	50,891	8,937	4,926
Örebro	S	110,352	68,705	41,640	27,065	140,150	82,827	57,313	25,514	1,551
Östergötland	G	161,837	99,157	62,650	36,507	196,741	115,106	81,629	33,477	3,030
Total		3,086,304	1,755,037	1,308,308	446,729	3,878,991	2,034,285	1,841,644	192,641	254,088
Source: SCB

== Results by city and district ==
=== Blekinge ===
Location	Share	Votes	S	FP	B	H	K	L-vote	R-vote	Left	Right	Margin
Location	%		%	%	%	%	%	%	%	%	%	
Bräkne	11.9	9,140	48.7	13.9	20.2	10.6	6.6	5,059	4,080	55.4	44.6	979
Karlshamn	7.4	5,728	50.2	25.8	0.9	18.3	4.8	3,152	2,576	55.0	45.0	576
Karlskrona	20.6	15,861	49.8	35.1	0.3	10.2	4.5	8,609	7,252	54.3	45.7	1,357
Lister	17.1	13,182	47.6	18.8	15.4	13.1	5.1	6,950	6,232	52.7	47.3	718
Medelstad	18.0	13,874	49.6	17.7	19.2	8.4	5.2	7,592	6,282	54.7	45.3	1,310
Ronneby	5.1	3,916	56.6	24.4	0.8	13.4	4.8	2,404	1,511	61.4	38.6	893
Sölvesborg	3.2	2,433	53.7	20.4	0.5	20.7	4.6	1,420	1,013	58.4	41.6	407
Östra	13.7	10,517	42.7	28.3	17.9	8.4	2.7	4,769	5,748	45.3	54.7	979
Postal vote	3.0	2,283						853	1,427			574
Total	2.0	76,934	48.3	24.0	11.3	11.7	4.7	40,808	36,121	53.0	47.0	4,687
Source: SCB

=== Gothenburg and Bohuslän ===
==== Bohuslän ====
Location	Share	Votes	S	FP	B	H	K	L-vote	R-vote	Left	Right	Margin
Location	%		%	%	%	%	%	%	%	%	%	
Askim	5.2	5,600	31.8	42.7	7.7	11.8	5.9	2,114	3,486	37.8	62.3	1,372
Bullaren	1.2	1,293	17.3	35.1	36.1	10.1	1.3	241	1,052	18.6	81.4	811
Inlands Fräkne	2.3	2,424	29.3	28.3	19.9	22.3	0.2	714	1,710	29.5	70.5	996
Inlands Nordre	4.2	4,529	21.8	27.6	25.8	24.2	0.6	1,012	3,517	22.3	77.7	2,505
Inlands Södre	3.4	3,656	28.9	19.1	31.9	17.9	2.2	1,136	2,520	31.1	68.9	1,384
Inlands Torpe	1.9	2,045	49.4	17.2	23.1	8.1	2.2	1,055	990	51.6	48.4	65
Kungälv	2.0	2,197	54.8	26.0	1.1	12.6	5.6	1,325	872	60.3	39.7	453
Kville	2.6	2,771	32.7	28.4	26.7	11.3	1.0	934	1,837	33.7	66.3	903
Lane	2.5	2,682	22.3	33.6	35.2	12.3	0.4	609	2,073	22.7	77.3	1,464
Lysekil	3.0	3,245	58.8	18.5	0.1	16.0	6.6	2,121	1,124	65.4	34.6	997
Marstrand	0.6	641	30.3	53.5	0.0	10.0	6.2	234	407	36.5	63.5	173
Mölndal	10.2	11,004	48.8	23.5	1.9	4.5	21.2	7,710	3,294	70.1	29.9	4,416
Orust Västra	4.2	4,506	25.2	42.9	13.5	18.1	0.4	1,152	3,354	25.6	74.4	2,202
Orust Östra	2.1	2,270	24.9	33.2	30.7	11.1	0.0	566	1,704	24.9	75.1	1,138
Sotenäs	5.9	6,349	52.7	29.7	5.5	10.4	1.7	3,458	2,891	54.5	45.5	567
Strömstad	1.6	1,688	48.1	30.3	0.5	18.5	2.6	856	832	50.7	49.3	24
Stångenäs	3.6	3,878	54.8	18.0	10.5	16.0	0.7	2,152	1,726	55.5	44.5	426
Sävedal	7.3	7,825	39.9	33.8	6.9	7.4	11.9	4,056	3,767	51.8	48.1	289
Sörbygden	1.3	1,399	7.8	26.9	33.7	31.5	0.0	109	1,290	7.8	92.2	1,181
Tanum	3.1	3,295	30.0	28.6	23.0	18.3	0.1	991	2,304	30.1	69.9	1,313
Tjörn	3.8	4,082	16.1	63.2	7.0	13.2	0.6	682	3,400	16.7	83.3	2,718
Tunge	3.8	4,091	50.2	22.3	13.8	12.2	1.5	2,112	1,979	51.6	48.4	133
Uddevalla	11.6	12,448	55.7	28.7	1.9	11.0	2.6	7,258	5,190	58.3	41.7	2,068
Vette	4.0	4,262	44.2	22.1	26.3	6.3	1.1	1,930	2,332	45.3	54.7	402
Västra Hising	5.6	6,011	21.5	39.4	17.4	19.7	2.0	1,413	4,598	23.5	76.5	3,185
Östra Hising	0.8	893	32.8	29.0	23.5	6.4	8.3	367	526	41.1	58.9	159
Postal vote	2.3	2,439						870	1,569			699
Total	2.8	107,523	39.1	30.6	12.5	13.1	4.7	47,177	60,344	43.9	56.1	13,167
Source: SCB

==== Gothenburg ====
Location	Share	Votes	S	FP	H	K	L-vote	R-vote	Left	Right	Margin
Location	%		%	%	%	%	%	%	%	%	
Gothenburg	100.0	199,294	38.0	34.5	11.0	15.3	106,146	90,771	53.3	45.5	15,375
Total	5.1	199,294	38.0	34.5	11.0	15.3	106,146	90,771	53.3	45.5	15.375
Source: SCB

=== Gotland ===
Location	Share	Votes	S	FP	B	H	K	L-vote	R-vote	Left	Right	Margin
Location	%		%	%	%	%	%	%	%	%	%	
Gotland Norra	38.6	12,325	37.7	13.9	36.1	11.5	0.8	4,744	7,581	38.5	61.5	2,837
Gotland Södra	36.2	11,558	23.5	23.7	42.6	10.2	0.1	2,723	8,835	23.6	76.4	6,112
Visby	22.5	7,179	51.1	19.0	3.7	25.3	0.9	3,730	3,449	52.0	48.0	281
Postal vote	2.7	855						228	627			399
Total	0.8	31,917	35.2	19.0	30.5	14.7	0.6	11,425	20,492	35.8	64.2	9,067
Source: SCB

=== Gävleborg ===
Location	Share	Votes	S	FP	B	H	K	L-vote	R-vote	Left	Right	Margin
Location	%		%	%	%	%	%	%	%	%	%	
Bollnäs	1.9	2,945	56.2	26.8	2.1	10.1	4.9	1,798	1,147	61.1	38.9	651
Bollnäs ting	10.2	15,520	47.7	17.3	21.4	3.6	9.9	8,940	6,580	57.6	42.4	2,360
Gästrikland Västra	11.6	17,629	54.0	14.4	14.1	5.3	12.0	11,651	5,978	66.1	33.9	5,673
Gästrikland Östra	9.5	14,364	54.5	17.8	14.0	4.8	8.9	9,113	5,251	63.4	36.6	3,862
Gävle	15.9	24,158	58.9	24.5	0.3	12.2	4.1	15,218	8,940	63.0	37.0	6,278
Hudiksvall	2.9	4,329	42.0	28.6	2.3	11.3	15.8	2,504	1,825	57.8	42.2	679
Norra Hälsingland	11.8	17,876	40.2	15.4	31.3	3.0	10.1	8,996	8,880	50.3	49.7	116
Sandviken	7.0	10,691	71.7	12.4	0.3	5.9	9.8	8,709	1,982	81.5	18.5	6,727
Sydöstra Hälsingland	11.4	17,269	55.5	10.0	16.6	2.2	15.6	12,285	4,984	71.1	28.9	7,301
Söderhamn	3.7	5,684	58.2	18.3	0.4	9.8	13.3	4,060	1,624	71.4	28.6	2,436
Västra Hälsingland	11.2	16,984	45.6	17.4	16.4	4.6	16.0	10,471	6,513	61.7	38.3	3,958
Postal vote	2.8	4,304						2,112	2,189			77
Total	3.9	151,753	52.7	17.6	12.9	6.3	10.5	95,857	55,893	63.2	36.8	39,964
Source: SCB

=== Halland ===
Location	Share	Votes	S	FP	B	H	K	L-vote	R-vote	Left	Right	Margin
Location	%		%	%	%	%	%	%	%	%	%	
Falkenberg	5.0	4,504	55.3	19.3	6.1	17.3	1.9	2,575	1,921	57.2	42.7	654
Faurås	8.9	8,024	22.9	8.8	57.9	10.0	0.3	1,869	6,150	23.3	76.6	4,281
Fjäre	10.5	9,478	27.1	13.9	46.0	11.8	1.2	2,682	6,796	28.3	71.7	4,114
Halmstad	20.7	18,708	53.0	21.1	1.6	15.6	8.7	11,546	7,159	61.7	38.3	4,387
Halmstad Hundred	8.4	7,579	45.4	8.7	30.9	13.2	1.8	3,575	4,004	47.2	52.8	429
Himle	7.0	6,345	22.7	12.4	53.4	10.9	0.6	1,478	4,865	23.3	76.7	3,387
Hök	10.8	9,757	27.4	7.8	55.8	8.5	0.5	2,727	7,030	27.9	72.1	4,303
Kungsbacka	1.7	1,530	39.3	27.3	3.3	26.9	3.2	651	879	42.5	57.5	228
Laholm	1.8	1,622	47.0	17.0	16.3	18.9	0.8	776	846	47.8	52.2	70
Tönnersjö	7.1	6,457	44.4	8.9	33.3	9.4	4.1	3,132	3,325	48.5	51.5	193
Varberg	7.6	6,838	54.8	25.7	2.1	12.9	4.1	4,032	2,784	59.0	40.7	1,248
Viske	3.1	2,788	16.3	17.1	54.6	11.8	0.2	460	2,328	16.5	83.5	1,868
Årstad	5.4	4,849	29.0	6.3	46.1	17.9	0.4	1,426	3,409	29.4	70.3	1,983
Postal vote	2.3	2,078						638	1,438			800
Total	2.3	90,557	38.5	14.8	30.8	13.5	3.0	37,567	52,934	41.5	58.5	15,367
Source: SCB

=== Jämtland ===
Location	Share	Votes	S	FP	B	H	K	L-vote	R-vote	Left	Right	Margin
Location	%		%	%	%	%	%	%	%	%	%	
Berg	4.7	3,440	44.5	13.6	28.3	7.1	6.4	1,752	1,688	50.9	49.1	64
Jämtland Norra	23.9	17,704	53.9	14.0	20.2	8.8	3.2	10,105	7,599	57.1	42.9	2,506
Jämtland Västra	21.3	15,757	44.0	23.0	21.1	8.9	2.5	7,389	8,368	46.9	53.1	979
Jämtland Östra	23.1	17,102	58.5	11.4	19.9	6.8	3.4	10,586	6,516	61.9	38.1	4,070
Sveg-Hede	9.6	7,112	58.7	17.5	10.0	4.4	9.5	4,846	2,266	68.1	31.9	2,580
Östersund	14.0	10,389	46.4	28.7	2.2	19.5	3.2	5,155	5,234	49.6	50.4	79
Postal vote	3.3	2,473						1,132	1,340			208
Total	1.9	73,977	51.4	18.1	16.8	9.8	3.9	40,965	33,011	55.4	44.6	7,954
Source: SCB

=== Jönköping ===
Location	Share	Votes	S	FP	B	H	K	L-vote	R-vote	Left	Right	Margin
Location	%		%	%	%	%	%	%	%	%	%	
Eksjö	2.9	4,429	49.7	29.1	2.8	18.4	0.0	2,201	2,228	49.7	50.3	27
Gränna	0.5	790	37.0	37.2	2.3	21.8	1.8	306	484	38.7	61.3	178
Huskvarna	4.5	6,787	61.6	22.4	0.3	5.6	10.2	4,871	1,916	71.8	28.2	2,955
Jönköping	14.8	22,578	50.7	28.7	1.4	15.6	3.5	12,253	10,325	54.3	45.7	1,928
Mo	2.3	3,467	17.9	37.2	36.7	8.1	0.2	626	2,841	18.1	81.9	2,215
Norra Vedbo	4.9	7,520	29.7	29.3	25.6	14.2	1.2	2,328	5,192	31.0	69.0	2,864
Nässjö	5.6	8,488	56.7	23.0	5.8	11.7	2.8	5,051	3,437	59.5	40.5	1,614
Sävsjö	1.5	2,260	44.3	21.5	15.1	16.4	2.7	1,062	1,198	47.0	53.0	136
Södra Vedbo	5.1	7,803	35.7	24.5	31.1	7.3	1.3	2,890	4,913	37.0	63.0	2,023
Tranås	3.6	5,504	54.2	27.8	1.8	13.1	3.3	3,154	2,350	57.3	42.7	804
Tveta	8.6	13,133	49.4	24.5	15.8	7.1	3.2	6,905	6,228	52.6	47.4	677
Vetlanda	2.5	3,744	50.0	28.1	1.9	13.6	6.4	2,114	1,630	56.5	43.5	484
Vista	2.3	3,439	23.4	31.6	36.0	7.9	1.0	842	2,597	24.5	75.5	1,755
Värnamo	4.0	6,064	48.8	23.7	8.8	13.4	5.2	3,277	2,787	54.0	46.0	490
Västbo	12.9	19,685	35.8	17.0	35.4	9.6	2.2	7,487	12,198	38.0	62.0	4,711
Västra	7.6	11,548	23.9	29.7	37.5	7.9	0.9	2,874	8,674	24.9	75.1	5,800
Östbo	6.7	10,144	32.0	27.1	24.7	13.1	3.2	3,567	6,577	35.2	64.8	3,010
Östra	6.7	10,192	31.4	25.6	34.0	6.7	2.4	3,440	6,752	33.8	66.2	3,312
Postal vote	3.1	4,721						1,515	3,205			1,690
Total	3.9	152,296	41.0	25.9	18.8	11.4	2.9	66,763	85,532	43.8	56.2	18,769
Source: SCB

=== Kalmar ===
Location	Share	Votes	S	FP	B	H	K	L-vote	R-vote	Left	Right	Margin
Location	%		%	%	%	%	%	%	%	%	%	
Algutsrum	2.3	2,905	34.5	8.5	30.8	24.8	1.3	1,042	1,863	35.9	64.1	821
Aspeland	6.4	8,171	45.5	15.2	22.5	15.7	1.2	3,816	4,355	46.7	53.3	539
Borgholm	0.9	1,158	44.1	35.1	2.2	16.5	2.1	535	623	46.2	53.8	88
Gräsgård	1.6	2,044	48.4	8.9	25.2	15.2	2.2	1,035	1,009	50.6	49.4	26
Handbörd	6.1	7,810	43.6	13.1	23.7	14.4	5.3	3,817	3,993	48.9	51.1	176
Kalmar	10.9	13,842	53.7	18.3	1.5	21.5	4.9	8,121	5,721	58.7	41.3	2,400
Möckleby	1.0	1,278	12.4	1.3	61.1	25.1	0.0	159	1,119	12.4	87.6	960
Norra Möre	4.4	5,557	42.9	8.5	28.0	19.5	1.2	2,448	3,109	44.1	55.9	661
Norra Tjust	6.6	8,462	51.7	7.5	26.4	13.1	1.4	4,492	3,970	53.1	46.9	522
Nybro	2.9	3,664	58.8	15.4	2.3	15.3	8.1	2,453	1,211	66.9	33.1	1,242
Oskarshamn	4.5	5,697	60.7	15.5	0.4	19.7	3.7	3,666	2,031	64.3	35.7	1,635
Runsten	1.4	1,743	14.3	5.3	64.2	16.1	0.1	251	1,492	14.4	85.6	1,241
Sevede	6.6	8,470	35.7	11.4	36.5	14.1	2.3	3,220	5,249	38.0	62.0	2,029
Slättbo	1.1	1,373	26.1	7.4	55.0	10.3	1.3	376	997	27.4	72.6	621
Stranda	5.9	7,514	44.1	12.9	18.1	16.6	8.3	3,931	3,583	52.3	47.7	348
Södra Möre	13.7	17,456	38.8	8.4	33.5	17.3	2.0	7,121	10,335	40.8	59.2	3,214
Södra Tjust	7.8	9,918	48.9	8.2	25.5	13.1	4.2	5,264	4,654	53.1	46.9	610
Tunalän	4.1	5,232	38.2	12.4	29.0	19.2	1.1	2,057	3,175	39.3	60.7	1,118
Vimmerby	1.8	2,335	48.7	19.9	7.8	23.1	0.6	1,150	1,185	49.3	50.7	35
Västervik	5.3	6,715	49.8	17.9	1.2	22.5	8.6	3,919	2,796	58.4	41.6	1,123
Åkerbo	2.3	2,927	23.4	8.8	59.6	6.3	1.8	738	2,189	25.2	74.8	1,451
Postal vote	2.5	3,139						1,024	2,113			1,089
Total	3.3	127,410	44.2	12.5	22.5	17.4	3.4	60,635	66,772	47.6	52.4	6,137
Source: SCB

=== Kopparberg ===
Location	Share	Votes	S	FP	B	H	K	L-vote	R-vote	Left	Right	Margin
Location	%		%	%	%	%	%	%	%	%	%	
Avesta	2.9	4,154	62.7	16.3	0.1	5.6	15.2	3,236	918	77.9	22.1	2,318
Borlänge	8.1	11,585	67.4	18.1	2.1	5.4	7.0	8,624	2,961	74.4	25.6	5,663
Falu Norra	8.0	11,421	50.1	23.2	16.2	6.1	4.4	6,221	5,200	54.5	45.5	1,021
Falu Södra	5.1	7,360	40.2	18.0	33.2	4.5	4.1	3,255	4,105	44.2	55.8	850
Falun	5.9	8,445	43.8	34.5	0.6	18.3	2.7	3,930	4,515	46.5	53.5	585
Folkare	6.3	9,036	52.4	15.3	19.5	4.2	8.7	5,516	3,520	61.0	39.0	1,996
Hedemora	1.9	2,716	48.0	30.4	4.1	13.4	3.9	1,412	1,304	52.0	48.0	108
Hedemora ting	7.0	9,993	50.3	13.1	28.8	4.2	3.6	5,382	4,611	53.9	46.1	771
Ludvika	3.3	4,791	60.0	24.1	0.7	10.5	4.7	3,098	1,693	64.7	35.3	1,405
Mora-Orsa	9.0	12,872	43.3	21.8	23.1	6.2	5.6	6,290	6,582	48.9	51.1	292
Nedansiljan	13.4	19,189	42.8	25.6	21.2	6.6	3.9	8,959	10,230	46.7	53.3	1,271
Nås-Malung	11.0	15,803	55.8	18.9	12.9	6.4	6.1	9,772	6,031	61.8	38.2	3,741
Säter	1.0	1,374	60.8	26.1	0.9	9.5	2.7	872	502	63.5	36.5	370
Västerbergslag	11.1	15,960	64.9	13.7	7.4	3.7	10.4	12,010	3,950	75.3	24.7	8,060
Älvdal-Särna-Idre	3.1	4,404	46.0	24.8	19.6	4.5	5.0	2,246	2,158	51.0	49.0	88
Postal vote	2.9	4,125						1,854	2,271			417
Total	3.7	143,228	51.9	20.9	14.4	6.9	5.9	82,677	60,551	57.7	42.3	22,126
Source: SCB

=== Kristianstad ===
Location	Share	Votes	S	FP	B	H	K	L-vote	R-vote	Left	Right	Margin
Location	%		%	%	%	%	%	%	%	%	%	
Albo	3.3	4,691	31.4	33.1	24.1	11.1	0.3	1,487	3,204	31.7	68.3	1,717
Bjäre	5.7	8,206	33.2	19.7	33.6	13.3	0.2	2,742	5,464	33.4	66.6	2,722
Gärd	6.7	9,606	41.3	31.6	18.3	8.4	0.5	4,013	5,593	41.8	58.2	1,580
Hässleholm	3.5	5,007	50.8	29.1	4.4	14.5	1.2	2,603	2,404	52.0	48.0	199
Ingelstad	9.0	12,845	37.5	26.1	26.6	9.6	0.1	4,835	8,009	37.6	62.4	3,174
Järrestad	3.2	4,601	42.1	25.2	25.7	6.7	0.3	1,952	2,649	42.4	57.6	697
Kristianstad	9.1	12,958	53.5	27.4	2.1	15.4	1.6	7,143	5,814	55.1	44.9	1,329
Norra Åsbo	12.3	17,505	39.5	22.2	24.4	12.5	1.4	7,153	10,352	40.9	59.1	3,199
Simrishamn	1.2	1,758	59.0	21.6	0.6	18.4	0.3	1,043	715	59.3	40.7	328
Södra Åsbo	6.0	8,504	48.0	18.2	25.8	7.2	0.8	4,146	4,358	48.8	51.2	212
Villand	9.6	13,765	52.0	21.1	14.1	7.5	5.2	7,879	5,886	57.2	42.8	1,993
Västra Göinge	12.8	18,285	32.9	24.5	29.6	11.6	1.4	6,262	12,023	34.2	65.8	5,761
Ängelholm	3.1	4,361	55.8	23.9	1.2	18.6	0.6	2,458	1,903	56.4	43.6	555
Östra Göinge	11.4	16,303	47.1	20.7	18.3	9.8	4.1	8,346	7,957	51.2	48.8	389
Postal vote	3.1	4,389						1,624	2,765			1,141
Total	3.7	142,784	42.9	24.3	19.6	11.5	1.7	63,686	79,096	44.6	55.4	15,410
Source: SCB

=== Kronoberg ===
Location	Share	Votes	S	FP	B	H	K	L-vote	R-vote	Left	Right	Margin
Location	%		%	%	%	%	%	%	%	%	%	
Allbo	17.9	15,247	39.3	13.3	25.9	18.8	2.8	6,413	8,834	42.1	57.9	2,421
Kinnevald	8.9	7,606	34.1	11.2	28.0	24.3	2.3	2,770	4,836	36.4	63.6	2,066
Konga	15.2	12,940	39.5	8.5	30.5	15.6	5.8	5,868	7,072	45.3	54.7	1,204
Ljungby	4.2	3,603	45.0	28.6	6.1	13.4	6.9	1,870	1,733	51.9	48.1	137
Norrvidinge	5.0	4,290	36.2	10.4	33.1	19.3	0.9	1,592	2,698	37.1	62.9	1,106
Sunnerbo	19.2	16,338	31.7	16.9	33.9	15.2	2.4	5,570	10,768	34.1	65.9	5,198
Uppvidinge	16.0	13,678	47.6	9.3	24.9	9.0	9.1	7,766	5,911	56.8	43.2	1,855
Växjö	10.8	9,180	45.3	22.4	3.9	23.4	5.0	4,621	4,559	50.3	49.7	62
Postal vote	2.8	2,417						972	1,445			473
Total	2.2	85,299	39.4	14.2	24.9	17.0	4.5	37,442	47,856	43.9	56.1	10,414
Source: SCB

=== Malmöhus ===
==== Malmö area ====
Location	Share	Votes	S	FP	B	H	K	L-vote	R-vote	Left	Right	Margin
Location	%		%	%	%	%	%	%	%	%	%	
Hälsingborg	20.9	39,758	59.1	19.6	0.8	17.2	3.3	24,816	14,936	62.4	37.6	9,880
Landskrona	7.5	14,220	68.5	16.5	0.2	11.2	3.5	10,240	3,974	72.0	27.9	6,266
Lund	10.2	19,401	51.6	23.6	2.6	20.5	1.7	10,335	9,055	53.3	46.7	1,280
Malmö	57.9	109,855	57.3	17.4	0.9	20.8	3.6	66,821	42,994	60.8	39.1	23,827
Postal vote	3.5	6,581						2,187	4,393			2,206
Total	4.9	189,815	57.0	18.8	1.0	19.9	3.3	114,399	75,352	60.3	39.7	39,047
Source: SCB

==== Malmöhus County ====
Location	Share	Votes	S	FP	B	H	K	L-vote	R-vote	Left	Right	Margin
Location	%		%	%	%	%	%	%	%	%	%	
Bara	7.4	11,320	57.6	11.6	19.0	10.3	1.4	6,677	4,643	59.0	41.0	2,034
Eslöv	2.8	4,258	57.8	22.3	4.2	15.7	0.1	2,464	1,794	57.9	42.1	670
Frosta	9.1	13,791	30.8	33.2	26.2	9.6	0.1	4,273	9,518	31.0	69.0	5,245
Färs	7.6	11,494	31.9	25.7	35.2	7.1	0.1	3,673	7,821	32.0	68.0	4,148
Harjager	4.5	6,831	55.6	9.2	26.1	8.9	0.1	3,805	3,026	55.7	44.3	779
Herrestad	2.3	3,513	50.8	14.0	30.4	4.9	0.0	1,784	1,729	50.8	49.2	55
Höganäs	2.8	4,278	73.6	16.1	0.9	9.0	0.4	3,165	1,113	74.0	26.0	2,052
Ljunit	1.9	2,873	45.0	11.0	40.1	3.9	0.0	1,294	1,579	45.0	55.0	285
Luggude	13.7	20,875	52.5	14.3	23.4	8.9	0.9	11,140	9,735	53.4	46.6	1,405
Onsjö	5.3	8,044	43.4	10.5	37.8	8.0	0.3	3,517	4,527	43.7	56.3	1,010
Oxie	6.2	9,389	57.0	10.9	23.1	8.2	0.8	5,425	3,964	57.8	42.2	1,461
Rönneberg	4.1	6,163	56.1	10.7	21.6	11.4	0.2	3,469	2,694	56.3	43.7	775
Skanör-Falsterbo	0.4	544	27.9	33.3	8.8	30.0	0.0	152	392	27.9	72.1	240
Skytt	4.7	7,209	50.1	13.4	27.7	8.3	0.5	3,644	3,565	50.5	49.5	79
Torna	6.8	10,400	49.8	10.0	32.3	7.8	0.1	5,189	5,207	49.9	50.1	18
Trelleborg	6.2	9,380	64.1	16.8	1.1	14.9	3.1	6,302	3,078	67.2	32.8	3,224
Vemmenhög	7.1	10,732	44.7	14.1	33.0	8.0	0.1	4,809	5,903	44.8	55.0	1,094
Ystad	4.8	7,345	64.7	19.1	0.8	15.3	0.1	4,758	2,587	64.8	35.2	2,171
Postal vote	2.4	3,601						1,307	2,294			987
Total	3.9	152,040	50.0	16.4	23.1	9.0	0.6	76,847	75,169	50.5	49.4	1,678
Source: SCB

=== Norrbotten ===
Location	Share	Votes	S	FP	B	H	K	L-vote	R-vote	Left	Right	Margin
Location	%		%	%	%	%	%	%	%	%	%	
Arvidsjaur-Arjeplog	6.6	7,237	46.5	16.0	2.8	6.3	28.4	5,420	1,817	74.9	25.1	3,603
Boden	4.8	5,278	56.7	19.2	0.2	15.8	8.1	3,418	1,860	64.8	35.2	1,558
Gällivare	8.1	8,803	43.1	7.5	1.7	14.3	33.3	6,722	2,081	76.4	23.6	4,641
Haparanda	1.2	1,271	46.3	12.8	0.6	26.7	13.5	761	510	59.9	40.1	251
Jokkmokk	3.9	4,210	48.1	12.5	1.1	6.3	32.0	3,372	838	80.1	19.9	2,534
Kalix	16.5	17,968	55.3	7.6	12.7	7.1	17.4	13,053	4,915	72.6	27.4	8,138
Karesuando	0.3	309	56.0	13.3	1.0	22.0	7.8	197	112	63.8	36.2	85
Kiruna	7.5	8,223	43.2	13.2	0.1	8.8	34.6	6,401	1,821	77.8	22.1	4,580
Luleå	8.6	9,446	42.8	17.2	0.5	16.9	22.6	6,177	3,267	65.4	34.6	2,910
Luleå ting	11.2	12,285	44.2	11.9	18.2	11.1	14.7	7,228	5,057	58.8	41.2	2,171
Pajala-Korpilombolo	5.1	5,568	41.4	5.3	7.4	13.9	31.9	4,084	1,484	73.3	26.7	2,600
Piteå	2.4	2,657	61.2	16.4	1.5	14.7	6.2	1,792	865	67.4	32.6	927
Piteå-Älvsby	14.6	15,919	57.1	6.2	15.3	4.8	16.6	11,731	4,188	73.7	26.3	7,543
Torneå	6.2	6,797	41.6	4.4	22.6	10.0	21.5	4,285	2,512	63.0	37.0	1,773
Postal vote	3.0	3,242						1,849	1,389			460
Total	2.8	109,213	48.6	10.7	8.8	10.5	21.4	76,490	32,716	70.0	30.0	43,774
Source: SCB

=== Skaraborg ===
Location	Share	Votes	S	FP	B	H	K	L-vote	R-vote	Left	Right	Margin
Location	%		%	%	%	%	%	%	%	%	%	
Barne	4.8	6,711	18.1	24.1	29.5	26.5	1.8	1,336	5,374	19.9	80.1	4,038
Falköping	4.3	6,015	49.8	29.0	2.3	16.4	2.4	3,137	2,873	52.2	47.8	264
Frökind	0.8	1,172	11.5	16.0	44.5	27.9	0.2	137	1,035	11.7	88.3	898
Gudhem	3.2	4,431	29.4	18.1	37.2	14.2	1.2	1,355	3,075	30.6	69.4	1,720
Hjo	1.4	1,935	44.7	30.4	2.2	21.3	0.9	882	1,045	45.6	54.0	163
Kinne	4.7	6,567	40.3	29.4	14.6	11.5	4.1	2,915	3,645	44.4	55.5	730
Kinnefjärding	2.5	3,430	29.5	26.1	30.1	13.2	1.1	1,049	2,381	30.6	69.4	1,332
Kåkind	6.4	8,873	37.1	24.2	24.6	10.8	2.5	3,513	5,291	39.6	59.6	1,778
Kålland	4.2	5,798	26.8	30.2	26.1	15.7	1.1	1,618	4,179	27.9	72.1	2,561
Laske	2.2	3,045	15.5	22.2	37.4	23.8	1.1	505	2,540	16.6	83.4	2,035
Lidköping	5.5	7,644	49.3	26.7	0.3	12.5	11.1	4,621	3,018	60.5	39.5	1,603
Mariestad	3.1	4,320	47.6	28.7	1.0	17.6	5.1	2,277	2,043	52.7	47.3	234
Skara	3.3	4,608	49.3	25.7	3.4	18.7	3.0	2,406	2,198	52.2	47.7	208
Skåning	4.2	5,899	20.6	18.8	41.7	18.3	0.6	1,246	4,651	21.1	78.8	3,405
Skövde	6.5	9,117	43.9	30.2	2.3	16.7	6.8	4,622	4,481	50.7	49.1	141
Tidaholm	2.6	3,619	61.8	21.5	1.2	8.0	7.4	2,506	1,113	69.2	30.8	1,393
Vadsbo	19.1	26,657	37.2	20.9	27.0	14.4	2.3	10,540	16,087	39.5	60.3	5,547
Valle	1.8	2,474	37.3	23.2	23.8	14.8	0.8	942	1,531	38.1	61.9	589
Vartofta	8.9	12,480	29.4	20.7	36.3	12.8	0.9	3,772	8,707	30.2	69.8	4,935
Vilske	2.2	3,092	17.6	17.8	36.1	27.2	1.3	584	2,506	18.9	81.0	1,922
Viste	3.6	4,956	17.6	21.2	29.7	29.0	2.5	995	3,961	20.1	79.9	2,966
Åse	2.1	2,932	27.6	20.5	33.1	17.3	1.6	854	2,078	29.1	70.9	1,224
Postal vote	2.6	3,685						1,049	2,634			1,585
Total	3.6	139,460	34.9	24.1	21.7	16.2	3.0	52,861	86,446	37.9	62.0	33,585
Source: SCB

=== Stockholm County ===
==== Stockholm ====
Location	Share	Votes	S	FP	B	H	K	L-vote	R-vote	Left	Right	Margin
Location	%		%	%	%	%	%	%	%	%	%	
Stockholm	100.0	432,759	38.2	34.5	0.8	16.9	9.6	206,687	225,875	47.8	52.2	19,188
Total	11.2	432,759	38.2	34.5	0.8	16.9	9.6	206,687	225,875	47.8	52.2	19,188
Source: SCB

==== Stockholm County ====
Location	Share	Votes	S	FP	B	H	K	L-vote	R-vote	Left	Right	Margin
Location	%		%	%	%	%	%	%	%	%	%	
Bro-Vätö	0.8	1,504	32.0	27.1	26.7	12.2	1.7	508	993	33.8	66.0	485
Danderyd	5.7	11,050	36.5	36.0	2.4	18.6	6.0	4,703	6,301	42.6	57.0	1,598
Djursholm	1.9	3,695	22.2	29.9	1.1	45.1	1.7	883	2,812	23.9	76.1	1,929
Frösåker	2.6	4,964	39.3	16.5	33.4	8.3	2.3	2,067	2,890	41.6	58.2	823
Frötuna-Länna	1.6	3,115	29.2	30.7	23.7	15.3	1.1	945	2,169	30.3	69.6	1,224
Färentuna	1.9	3,683	45.5	20.9	22.2	7.0	4.4	1,836	1,844	49.9	50.1	8
Lidingö	4.8	9,407	30.6	35.1	0.7	27.6	6.0	3,445	5,961	36.6	63.4	2,516
Lyhundra	1.0	1,960	30.5	16.9	33.0	15.8	3.7	670	1,288	34.2	65.7	618
Långhundra	1.0	1,907	33.7	19.7	34.6	10.3	1.7	676	1,231	35.4	64.6	555
Norrtälje	1.8	3,473	47.6	28.8	1.7	16.8	5.1	1,831	1,642	52.7	47.3	189
Nynäshamn	2.2	4,352	65.8	17.1	0.3	7.1	9.7	3,284	1,068	75.5	24.5	2,216
Närdinghundra	1.9	3,689	44.7	15.8	28.5	6.7	4.3	1,807	1,882	49.0	51.0	75
Seminghundra	0.8	1,626	29.3	21.3	37.2	10.6	1.7	503	1,123	30.9	69.1	620
Sigtuna	0.6	1,134	43.2	26.6	10.1	18.3	1.7	509	625	44.9	55.1	116
Sjuhundra	1.3	2,583	50.1	19.8	17.1	8.6	4.5	1,408	1,175	54.5	45.5	233
Sollentuna	12.4	24,014	50.5	31.6	1.7	7.4	8.7	14,220	9,780	59.2	40.7	4,440
Solna	10.2	19,796	43.4	30.5	0.6	9.9	15.6	11,686	8,097	59.0	40.9	3,589
Sotholm	4.5	8,728	43.6	28.8	14.6	6.0	6.9	4,411	4,312	50.5	49.4	99
Sundbyberg	5.1	9,934	55.1	24.4	0.2	5.3	15.0	6,962	2,968	70.1	29.9	3,994
Svartlösa	13.3	25,789	47.8	28.1	2.0	11.6	10.6	15,037	10,739	58.3	41.6	4,298
Södertälje	6.6	12,871	56.1	23.1	0.9	11.1	8.6	8,336	4,523	64.8	35.1	3,813
Vallentuna	2.1	4,004	51.0	20.9	11.7	10.2	6.1	2,287	1,716	57.1	42.9	571
Vaxholm	0.8	1,544	40.5	44.7	0.7	12.4	1.7	652	892	42.2	57.8	240
Väddö-Häverö	2.3	4,517	45.4	21.1	16.9	9.8	6.6	2,349	2,163	52.0	47.9	186
Värmdö	3.4	6,510	47.3	32.1	3.7	8.7	8.3	3,617	2,891	55.6	44.4	726
Åker	1.7	3,277	35.8	30.7	21.5	9.6	2.3	1,250	2,023	38.1	61.7	773
Ärlinghundra	1.7	3,318	45.7	22.6	21.3	8.6	1.8	1,576	1,739	47.5	52.4	163
Öknebo	2.5	4,852	56.4	19.2	9.6	11.0	3.7	2,918	1,933	60.1	39.8	985
Öregrund	0.3	625	37.0	36.5	2.4	18.6	5.6	266	359	42.6	57.4	93
Östhammar	0.4	738	36.2	37.0	2.4	18.8	5.6	308	430	41.7	58.3	122
Postal vote	2.8	5,491						1,929	3,562			1,633
Total	5.0	194,150	45.0	27.7	7.0	12.2	8.0	102,879	91,131	53.0	46.9	11,748
Source:SCB

=== Södermanland ===
Location	Share	Votes	S	FP	B	H	K	L-vote	R-vote	Left	Right	Margin
Location	%		%	%	%	%	%	%	%	%	%	
Daga	3.5	4,323	41.3	23.7	22.7	9.9	2.4	1,889	2,434	43.7	56.3	545
Eskilstuna	24.5	30,199	64.2	24.4	1.3	6.3	3.8	20,531	9,668	68.0	32.0	10,863
Hölebo	2.5	3,128	50.1	19.5	22.4	4.8	3.2	1,669	1,459	53.4	46.6	210
Jönåker	8.5	10,441	58.7	14.6	18.4	5.5	2.9	6,425	4,016	61.5	38.5	2,409
Katrineholm	6.6	8,205	63.6	23.3	1.0	8.9	3.1	5,473	2,732	66.7	33.3	2,741
Mariefred	0.8	961	41.8	39.1	1.1	16.2	1.7	418	543	43.5	56.5	125
Nyköping	8.2	10,151	61.3	24.4	1.3	11.1	1.9	6,414	3,737	63.2	36.8	2,677
Oppunda	12.7	15,697	50.0	22.3	20.5	5.8	1.3	8,061	7,636	51.4	48.6	425
Rönö	3.9	4,856	47.7	16.5	30.4	5.1	0.4	2,333	2,523	48.0	52.0	190
Selebo	2.4	2,996	45.7	19.5	26.2	7.4	1.3	1,407	1,589	47.0	53.0	182
Strängnäs	3.0	3,645	45.2	29.8	1.5	23.1	0.4	1,662	1,983	45.6	54.4	321
Torshälla	1.2	1,430	62.0	22.8	3.7	7.1	4.4	949	481	66.4	33.6	468
Trosa	0.6	708	51.4	25.6	1.7	19.1	2.3	380	328	53.7	46.3	52
Villåttinge	7.4	9,173	53.0	19.7	15.4	8.3	3.6	5,191	3,982	56.6	43.4	1,209
Västerrekarne	3.5	4,355	42.5	23.0	27.6	5.1	1.9	1,931	2,424	44.3	55.7	493
Åker	3.1	3,854	56.1	14.5	22.6	5.8	1.1	2,203	1,651	57.2	42.8	552
Österrekarne	4.8	5,958	46.1	23.2	23.0	6.3	1.4	2,833	3,125	47.5	52.5	292
Postal vote	2.7	3,368						1,334	2,032			698
Total	3.2	123,448	55.1	22.4	12.0	8.0	2.5	71,103	52,343	57.6	42.4	18,760
Source: SCB

=== Uppsala ===
Location	Share	Votes	S	FP	B	H	K	L-vote	R-vote	Left	Right	Margin
Location	%		%	%	%	%	%	%	%	%	%	
Bro	1.6	1,360	58.9	18.2	12.4	9.1	1.4	820	540	60.3	39.7	280
Bälinge	1.8	1,461	23.4	19.7	50.2	4.8	1.8	369	1,092	25.3	74.7	723
Enköping	5.7	4,804	56.2	26.2	1.0	14.2	2.4	2,815	1,989	58.6	41.4	826
Hagunda	2.5	2,090	38.9	16.7	35.3	8.1	1.1	834	1,256	39.9	60.1	422
Håbo	2.4	2,041	48.9	23.3	14.5	11.1	2.2	1,043	998	51.1	48.9	45
Lagunda	1.7	1,471	34.6	17.3	35.8	11.9	0.4	515	956	35.0	65.0	441
Norunda	3.4	2,892	40.8	22.0	29.5	5.5	2.1	1,242	1,650	42.9	57.1	408
Oland	12.3	10,444	47.2	21.1	22.6	4.6	4.4	5,395	5,049	51.7	48.3	346
Rasbo	1.7	1,477	44.2	15.5	33.4	6.2	0.7	663	814	44.9	55.1	151
Trögd	3.7	3,146	37.1	12.6	39.8	9.7	0.9	1,194	1,952	38.0	62.0	758
Ulleråker	1.5	1,242	33.1	16.4	41.0	6.3	3.2	451	791	36.3	63.7	340
Uppsala	38.5	32,555	49.4	29.2	1.5	15.4	4.5	17,546	15,009	53.9	46.1	2,537
Vaksala	1.6	1,317	47.8	15.9	29.1	5.2	1.9	655	662	49.7	50.3	7
Åsunda	2.5	2,156	39.9	12.4	37.5	9.4	0.9	879	1,277	40.8	59.2	398
Örbyhus	16.1	13,592	64.5	14.8	14.3	4.1	2.4	9,087	4,505	66.9	33.1	4,582
Postal vote	3.0	2,566						871	1,695			824
Total	2.2	84,614	49.2	23.0	13.8	10.8	3.2	44,379	40,235	52.4	47.6	4,144
Source: SCB

=== Värmland ===
Location	Share	Votes	S	FP	B	H	K	L-vote	R-vote	Left	Right	Margin
Location	%		%	%	%	%	%	%	%	%	%	
Arvika	4.9	7,681	45.9	27.8	3.4	9.6	13.4	4,554	3,127	59.3	40.7	1,427
Filipstad	2.2	3,476	52.1	24.0	2.0	12.5	9.4	2,137	1,339	61.5	38.5	798
Fryksdal	10.9	17,108	40.8	16.8	22.9	10.3	9.2	8,555	8,553	50.0	50.0	2
Färnebo	5.9	9,216	71.8	11.5	3.7	3.6	9.4	7,483	1,733	81.2	18.8	5,750
Gillberg	3.8	6,005	47.9	17.9	21.1	9.7	3.5	3,085	2,920	51.4	48.6	165
Grums	4.3	6,695	60.2	12.5	14.3	4.5	8.5	4,599	2,096	68.7	31.3	2,503
Jösse	6.9	10,790	48.5	20.6	16.6	8.1	6.3	5,907	4,883	54.7	45.3	1,024
Karlstad	11.9	18,548	49.4	29.7	0.9	13.8	6.2	10,302	8,245	55.5	44.5	2,057
Karlstad Hundred	5.2	8,210	64.4	14.0	5.2	5.9	10.4	6,147	2,063	74.9	25.1	4,084
Kil	6.7	10,491	56.8	16.2	14.9	5.8	6.3	6,616	3,875	63.1	36.9	2,741
Kristinehamn	6.1	9,482	56.0	26.9	0.5	10.1	6.4	5,924	3,558	62.5	37.5	2,366
Nordmark	5.4	8,452	34.9	30.1	21.7	10.6	2.8	3,183	5,269	37.7	62.3	2,086
Nyed	1.8	2,868	45.1	18.8	25.9	6.6	3.6	1,397	1,471	48.7	51.3	74
Näs	4.7	7,413	35.4	22.6	24.9	9.2	8.0	3,218	4,195	43.4	56.6	977
Visnum	2.2	3,446	46.4	15.6	24.1	7.5	6.4	1,822	1,624	52.9	47.1	198
Väse	2.4	3,695	39.8	20.1	29.6	9.2	1.3	1,518	2,177	41.1	58.9	659
Älvdal	10.3	16,085	55.3	11.5	7.6	5.9	19.8	12,071	4,014	75.0	25.0	8,057
Ölme	1.2	1,821	38.5	21.4	26.5	10.8	2.9	753	1,068	41.4	58.6	315
Postal vote	3.2	4,963						2,223	2,740			517
Total	4.0	156,445	50.1	20.3	12.2	9.0	8.4	91,494	64,950	58.5	41.5	26,544
Source: SCB

=== Västerbotten ===
Location	Share	Votes	S	FP	B	H	K	L-vote	R-vote	Left	Right	Margin
Location	%		%	%	%	%	%	%	%	%	%	
Lycksele	1.3	1,580	47.2	33.0	0.4	15.0	4.4	814	766	51.5	48.5	48
Lycksele ting	10.8	12,769	45.2	40.5	3.2	5.6	5.5	6,474	6,295	50.7	49.3	179
Norsjö-Malå	5.0	5,869	45.3	32.2	7.3	9.2	6.0	3,011	2,858	51.3	48.7	153
Skellefteå	5.9	6,908	56.9	23.4	0.4	13.9	5.4	4,304	2,604	62.3	37.7	1,700
Skellefteå ting	18.3	21,603	48.0	18.9	16.7	12.6	3.8	11,189	10,412	51.8	48.2	777
Umeå	6.8	7,980	46.5	32.2	1.1	19.0	1.3	3,816	4,164	47.8	52.2	348
Umeå ting	14.2	16,767	40.7	27.7	20.8	8.3	2.5	7,247	9,520	43.2	56.8	2,273
Västerbotten M	11.2	13,194	30.3	27.9	27.5	13.6	0.7	4,093	9,101	31.0	69.0	5,008
Västerbotten S	13.1	15,504	45.3	29.8	15.8	8.5	0.6	7,125	8,379	46.0	54.0	1,254
Åsele-Vilhelmina	10.0	11,755	57.6	25.1	9.7	4.4	3.1	7,134	4,621	60.7	39.3	2,513
Postal vote	3.4	4,001						1,898	2,103			205
Total	3.0	117,930	45.4	28.0	13.1	10.5	3.0	57,105	60,823	48.4	51.6	3,718
Source: SCB

=== Västernorrland ===
Location	Share	Votes	S	FP	B	H	K	L-vote	R-vote	Left	Right	Margin
Location	%		%	%	%	%	%	%	%	%	%	
Härnösand	4.6	7,073	44.3	29.4	2.7	18.0	5.5	3,523	3,550	49.8	50.2	27
Kramfors	5.3	8,091	54.8	9.5	4.4	3.2	28.1	6,710	1,381	82.9	17.1	5,329
Medelpad V	12.1	18,625	48.9	16.2	20.9	3.7	10.3	11,018	7,607	59.2	40.8	3,411
Medelpad Ö	17.5	26,863	60.6	14.4	9.3	3.3	12.5	19,616	7,247	73.0	27.0	12,369
Sollefteå	2.6	4,047	55.3	16.5	8.5	17.5	2.2	2,331	1,716	57.6	42.4	615
Sundsvall	8.8	13,525	47.6	29.4	0.9	15.9	6.2	7,278	6,246	53.8	46.2	1,032
Ångermanland M	7.8	11,987	61.9	6.1	16.2	4.3	11.5	8,795	3,192	73.4	26.6	5,603
Ångermanland N	17.3	26,469	51.4	18.7	18.4	6.4	5.1	14,962	11,507	56.5	43.5	3,455
Ångermanland S	9.7	14,910	48.1	12.0	27.7	4.9	7.3	8,254	6,656	55.4	44.6	1,598
Ångermanland V	8.5	13,105	54.3	6.0	25.3	4.9	9.6	8,376	4,729	63.9	36.1	3,647
Örnsköldsvik	2.5	3,814	44.0	30.1	1.5	19.7	4.7	1,856	1,958	48.7	51.3	102
Postal vote	3.1	4,800						2,397	2,403			6
Total	4.0	153,309	52.7	16.3	14.4	7.3	9.3	95,116	58,192	62.0	38.0	36,924
Source: SCB

=== Västmanland ===
Location	Share	Votes	S	FP	B	H	K	L-vote	R-vote	Left	Right	Margin
Location	%		%	%	%	%	%	%	%	%	%	
Arboga	4.3	4,645	62.8	20.5	1.5	10.3	4.9	3,146	1,499	67.7	32.3	1,647
Fagersta	5.7	6,111	70.4	12.6	2.6	6.8	7.5	4,765	1,346	78.0	22.0	3,419
Gamla Norberg	4.0	4,353	64.6	12.8	9.5	6.6	6.5	3,093	1,260	71.1	28.9	1,833
Köping	6.3	6,794	56.5	20.4	4.5	8.3	10.4	4,541	2,253	66.8	33.2	2,288
Norrbo	2.8	2,979	54.3	11.7	29.3	3.8	0.9	1,646	1,333	55.3	44.7	313
Sala	4.7	5,136	54.8	20.8	6.3	13.0	5.2	3,079	2,057	59.9	40.1	1,022
Siende	1.9	2,001	62.6	13.1	17.0	4.0	3.2	1,317	684	65.8	34.2	633
Simtuna	4.5	4,868	39.4	16.3	30.2	8.1	5.2	2,167	2,701	44.5	55.5	534
Skinnskatteberg	2.9	3,105	65.5	14.0	12.3	2.9	5.3	2,199	906	70.8	29.2	1,293
Snevringe	11.9	12,817	63.8	11.5	11.0	4.9	8.7	9,304	3,513	72.6	27.4	5,791
Torstuna	2.3	2,438	38.4	15.5	29.7	6.6	9.8	1,175	1,263	48.2	51.8	88
Tuhundra	1.0	1,059	41.4	15.0	38.2	3.6	1.8	457	602	43.2	56.8	145
Vagnsbro	1.6	1,755	28.1	22.5	47.2	2.1	0.2	496	1,259	28.3	71.7	763
Våla	4.1	4,461	37.9	22.0	31.3	5.9	2.9	1,821	2,640	40.8	59.2	819
Västerås	27.1	29,324	60.6	21.3	1.8	9.8	6.5	19,687	9,637	67.1	32.9	10,050
Yttertjurbo	1.1	1,139	38.2	15.7	40.5	4.9	0.7	443	696	38.9	61.1	253
Åkerbo	8.2	8,907	51.3	15.1	21.7	4.5	7.4	5,223	3,684	58.6	41.4	1,539
Övertjurbo	2.9	3,118	32.4	13.8	49.3	4.1	0.4	1,024	2,094	32.8	67.2	1,070
Postal vote	2.9	3,128						1,529	1,599			70
Total	2.8	108,138	55.9	17.6	12.7	7.6	6.2	67,112	41,026	62.1	37.9	26,086
Source: SCB

=== Älvsborg ===
==== Älvsborg N ====
Location	Share	Votes	S	FP	B	H	K	L-vote	R-vote	Left	Right	Margin
Location	%		%	%	%	%	%	%	%	%	%	
Ale	8.1	8,520	43.4	19.2	24.9	6.2	6.3	4,232	4,288	49.7	50.3	56
Alingsås	6.3	6,622	49.8	33.4	0.7	11.6	4.4	3,591	3,031	54.2	45.8	560
Bjärke	2.3	2,402	19.4	40.1	24.6	15.2	0.5	480	1,922	20.0	80.0	1,442
Flundre	3.6	3,808	58.8	12.6	17.8	4.9	6.0	2,468	1,340	64.8	35.2	1,128
Gäsene	4.4	4,629	15.1	23.6	33.0	27.7	0.5	722	3,907	15.6	84.4	3,185
Kulling	9.0	9,429	27.1	35.5	21.3	14.6	1.5	2,694	6,735	28.6	71.4	4,041
Nordal	5.3	5,573	39.7	21.3	29.9	7.5	1.6	2,300	3,272	41.3	58.7	972
Sundal	5.5	5,793	10.7	14.8	60.3	13.8	0.4	638	5,155	11.0	89.0	4,517
Trollhättan	11.9	12,446	60.4	23.0	1.9	6.3	8.4	8,562	3,884	68.8	31.2	4,678
Tössbo	3.0	3,136	30.8	21.3	31.9	10.8	5.3	1,130	2,006	36.0	64.0	876
Valbo	4.4	4,642	31.6	14.0	41.0	13.1	0.3	1,482	3,159	31.9	68.1	1,677
Vedbo	10.4	10,904	40.8	23.9	24.8	6.7	3.8	4,865	6,039	44.6	55.4	1,174
Väne	4.4	4,598	48.5	19.2	19.0	7.7	5.7	2,492	2,106	54.2	45.8	386
Vänersborg	7.4	7,750	50.2	29.3	3.9	13.4	3.1	4,133	3,617	53.3	46.7	516
Vättle	7.3	7,615	39.0	34.3	10.4	10.2	6.1	3,434	4,181	45.1	54.9	747
Åmål	4.3	4,482	52.5	28.4	1.2	12.7	5.2	2,587	1,895	57.7	42.3	692
Postal vote	2.5	2,612						968	1,643			675
Total	2.7	104,961	40.5	25.2	19.3	10.9	4.1	46,778	58,180	44.6	55.4	11,402
Source: SCB

==== Älvsborg S ====
Location	Share	Votes	S	FP	B	H	K	L-vote	R-vote	Left	Right	Margin
Location	%		%	%	%	%	%	%	%	%	%	
Bollebygd	4.1	3,791	36.7	20.9	15.6	24.7	2.0	1,468	2,323	38.7	61.3	855
Borås	32.0	29,751	51.8	18.4	0.8	21.5	7.5	17,641	12,110	59.3	40.7	5,531
Kind	17.7	16,420	33.9	12.9	31.6	21.1	0.5	5,651	10,769	34.4	65.6	5,118
Mark	21.6	20,075	46.5	9.7	19.0	21.6	3.2	9,983	10,091	49.7	50.3	108
Redväg	4.7	4,407	14.5	27.7	35.5	22.0	0.3	652	3,755	14.8	85.2	3,103
Ulricehamn	4.5	4,189	39.7	26.0	5.2	27.8	1.4	1,722	2,467	41.1	58.9	745
Veden	5.2	4,873	31.6	18.8	17.4	29.1	3.1	1,688	3,185	34.6	65.4	1,497
Ås	7.5	6,928	32.7	16.1	25.3	24.5	1.4	2,357	4,571	34.0	66.0	2,214
Postal vote	2.6	2,412						792	1,620			828
Total	2.4	92,846	41.5	16.5	15.5	22.8	3.7	41,954	50,891	45.2	54.8	8,937
Source: SCB

=== Örebro ===
Location	Share	Votes	S	FP	B	H	K	L-vote	R-vote	Left	Right	Margin
Location	%		%	%	%	%	%	%	%	%	%	
Asker	3.0	4,231	38.4	27.7	25.4	8.0	0.6	1,648	2,583	39.0	61.0	935
Askersund	1.0	1,347	46.9	31.9	2.2	18.0	1.0	645	702	47.9	52.1	57
Edsberg	4.4	6,129	45.7	25.8	18.8	6.4	3.2	2,998	3,131	48.9	51.1	133
Fellingsbro	3.9	5,464	46.6	21.8	22.3	7.9	1.4	2,624	2,840	48.0	52.0	216
Glanshammar	2.0	2,849	34.5	24.7	30.8	9.3	0.8	1,004	1,845	35.2	64.8	841
Grimsten	2.9	4,102	55.0	21.5	11.4	4.3	7.8	2,579	1,523	62.9	37.1	1,056
Grythytte-Hällefors	3.4	4,819	65.3	14.0	1.7	3.5	15.4	3,893	926	80.8	19.2	2,967
Hardemo	0.7	1,025	30.8	23.0	38.3	5.7	2.1	338	687	33.0	67.0	349
Karlskoga	11.7	16,452	53.0	19.7	5.0	6.6	15.7	11,306	5,146	68.7	31.3	6,160
Karlskoga Hundred	3.7	5,184	62.6	15.1	9.1	3.6	9.6	3,746	1,438	72.3	27.7	2,308
Kumla	3.4	4,772	55.8	27.5	1.2	5.4	10.2	3,146	1,626	65.9	34.1	1,520
Kumla Hundred	5.7	7,983	53.5	21.9	12.1	7.9	4.7	4,643	3,340	58.2	41.8	1,303
Linde-Ramsberg	4.4	6,221	53.5	13.7	24.2	5.8	2.7	3,502	2,719	56.3	43.7	783
Lindesberg	2.1	3,001	50.9	24.8	1.8	17.5	5.0	1,677	1,324	55.9	44.1	353
Nora	1.3	1,891	48.4	26.3	1.5	16.2	7.7	1,060	831	56.1	43.9	229
Nora-Hjulsjö	3.0	4,161	57.6	16.6	14.3	4.6	6.8	2,680	1,481	64.4	35.6	1,199
Nya Kopparberg	3.6	4,990	64.8	13.1	5.9	5.1	11.0	3,786	1,204	75.9	24.1	2,582
Sköllersta	3.4	4,797	42.4	27.4	21.1	7.8	1.5	2,103	2,694	43.8	56.2	591
Sundbo	2.8	3,971	55.6	13.2	24.1	4.8	2.2	2,296	1,675	57.8	42.2	621
Örebro	26.3	36,883	56.8	27.6	0.9	10.0	4.8	22,698	14,184	61.5	38.5	8,514
Örebro Hundred	4.1	5,686	45.2	24.4	19.5	9.1	1.8	2,675	3,011	47.0	53.0	336
Postal vote	3.0	4,192						1,780	2,403			623
Total	3.6	140,150	52.8	23.0	9.7	8.2	6.3	82,827	57,313	59.1	40.9	25,514
Source: SCB

=== Östergötland ===
Location	Share	Votes	S	FP	B	H	K	L-vote	R-vote	Left	Right	Margin
Location	%		%	%	%	%	%	%	%	%	%	
Aska	1.3	2,522	43.9	14.9	28.0	9.5	3.6	1,199	1,323	47.5	52.5	124
Bankekind	3.4	6,774	61.1	12.1	17.3	7.4	2.2	4,283	2,491	63.2	36.8	1,792
Björkekind	0.9	1,736	39.5	9.1	37.3	13.7	0.5	694	1,042	40.0	60.0	348
Boberg	2.1	4,105	53.3	15.6	18.5	8.4	4.2	2,363	1,742	57.6	42.4	621
Bråbo	1.5	2,911	68.9	9.8	5.4	10.5	5.4	2,162	749	74.3	25.7	1,413
Dal	1.0	1,948	55.1	9.7	25.0	7.4	2.9	1,129	819	58.0	42.0	310
Finspånga län	7.6	14,960	60.3	12.2	15.8	8.4	3.2	9,511	5,449	63.6	36.4	4,062
Gullberg	1.9	3,654	57.5	10.8	19.6	7.5	4.6	2,270	1,384	62.1	37.9	886
Göstring	3.6	7,144	52.1	11.8	20.7	8.0	7.4	4,249	2,895	59.5	40.5	1,354
Hammarkind	4.5	8,900	47.8	11.7	25.4	12.7	2.4	4,471	4,429	50.2	49.8	42
Hanekind	2.1	4,052	53.1	15.2	18.4	10.6	2.7	2,263	1,789	55.8	44.2	474
Kinda	4.4	8,638	43.1	13.4	28.6	13.3	1.5	3,856	4,782	44.6	55.4	926
Linköping	14.4	28,349	52.7	22.9	1.7	15.7	7.1	16,940	11,409	59.8	40.2	5,531
Lysing	2.3	4,486	41.8	16.6	31.5	8.8	1.4	1,935	2,551	43.1	56.9	616
Lösing	1.2	2,427	56.9	11.3	16.4	11.7	3.8	1,472	955	60.7	39.3	517
Memming	1.4	2,810	69.3	10.1	6.8	7.5	6.2	2,122	688	75.5	24.5	1,434
Mjölby	2.3	4,505	63.7	17.5	5.9	10.6	2.3	2,974	1,531	66.0	34.0	1,443
Motala	6.6	13,054	60.1	17.8	1.8	11.3	8.9	9,010	4,044	69.0	31.0	4,966
Norrköping	23.9	47,094	59.2	15.8	1.2	17.6	6.2	30,788	16,306	65.4	34.6	14,482
Skänninge	0.6	1,258	45.0	20.5	7.6	21.5	5.4	634	624	50.4	49.6	10
Skärkind	1.1	2,236	46.7	8.7	32.7	11.1	0.8	1,063	1,173	47.5	52.5	110
Söderköping	0.9	1,798	47.3	23.4	5.3	22.8	1.1	871	927	48.4	51.6	56
Vadstena	1.0	1,944	54.8	20.2	2.5	20.3	2.3	1,110	834	57.1	42.9	276
Valkebo	1.7	3,315	45.7	14.2	27.2	12.0	0.9	1,544	1,771	46.6	53.4	227
Vifolka	1.7	3,422	46.0	11.9	28.1	10.6	3.5	1,692	1,730	49.4	50.6	38
Ydre	1.8	3,515	31.2	26.9	31.3	9.7	0.8	1,127	2,388	32.1	67.9	1,261
Åkerbo	0.7	1,400	34.9	14.4	36.4	13.1	1.1	505	895	36.1	63.9	390
Östkind	1.3	2,520	36.6	12.3	36.7	14.0	0.3	929	1,591	36.9	63.1	662
Postal vote	2.7	5,264						1,940	3,318			1,378
Total	5.1	196,741	53.8	16.1	11.8	13.6	4.7	115,106	81,629	58.5	41.5	33,477
Source: SCB
