= Gotland County (Riksdag constituency) =

Swedish electoral district

- Gotlands Län
- Constituency for the Riksdag
- Location of Gotland County within Sweden
- County: Gotland
- Population: 60,852 (2025)
- Electorate: 48,457 (2026)
- Area: 3,182 km^{2} (2026)

Current constituency
- Created: 1970
- Seats: 2 (1970–present) (Note: Constituency seats only.)
- Member of the Riksdag: List: Filip Reinhag (S); Jesper Skalberg Karlsson (M)
- Created from: Gotland County

Gotland County (Swedish: Gotlands Län) is one of the 29 multi-member constituencies of the Riksdag, the national legislature of Sweden. The constituency was established in 1970 when the Riksdag changed from a bicameral legislature to a unicameral legislature. It is conterminous with the county of Gotland. The constituency currently elects two of the 349 members of the Riksdag using the open party-list proportional representation electoral system. At the 2026 general election it had 48,457 registered electors.

== Electoral system ==
Gotland County currently elects two of the 349 members of the Riksdag using the open party-list proportional representation electoral system. Constituency seats are allocated using the modified Sainte-Laguë method. Only parties that reach the 4% national threshold and parties that receive at least 12% of the vote in the constituency compete for constituency seats. Supplementary levelling seats may also be allocated at the constituency level to parties that reach the 4% national threshold.

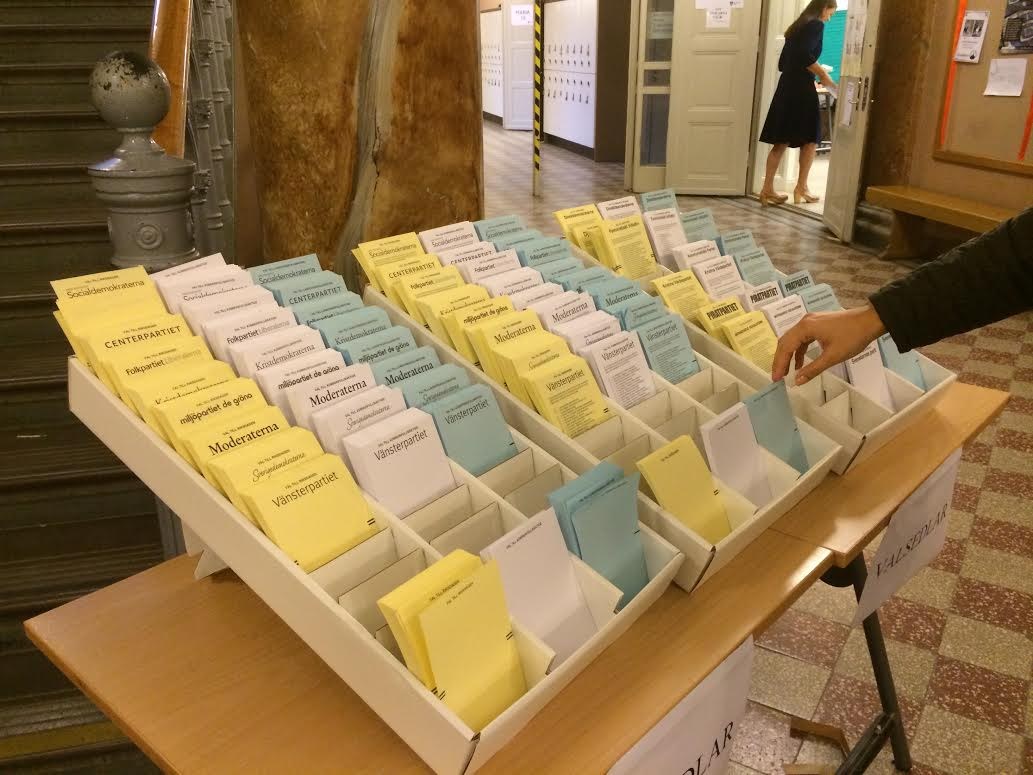
A selection of ballot papers available for voters at the 2014 general election in Stockholm - yellow for the Riksdag, blue for the regional council and white for the municipal council

Prior to 1997 voters could cast any ballot paper they wanted, though it had to contain the name of a party and the name of at least one candidate nominated by that party in the constituency. It was common for parties to hand out ballot papers with their name and list of candidates at the entrance of polling stations. Voters could delete the names of candidates or write-in the names of other candidates but in practice these options weren't used enough by voters to have any significant impact on the results and consequently elections operated as a closed system.

Since 1997, elections in Sweden follow the French model in having separate ballot papers for each party/list in a constituency. There are two ballot papers for each party - a party ballot paper (partivalsedel) with just the name of the party and a name ballot paper (namnvalsedel) with the name of the party and its list of candidates. There are also blank ballot papers (blank valsedel). Voters can initially pick as many ballot papers as they wish and then, in the secrecy of the voting booth, they select a single ballot paper of their choice. If they chose a name ballot paper they have the option of casting a preferential vote for one of their chosen party's candidates. If they chose a blank ballot paper they can write the name of any party including unregistered parties and, optionally, they can write the name of any person as their preferred candidate, even one that does not belong to their chosen party. They then place their chosen ballot paper in an envelope which is placed in the ballot box, discarding all other ballot papers they picked.

Seats won by each party/list in a constituency are allocated to its candidates in order of preference votes (a personal mandate), provided that the candidate has received at least 8% of votes cast for their party in the constituency (5% since January 2011). Any unfilled seats are then allocated to the party's remaining candidates in the order they appear on the party list (a party mandate).

== Election results ==
=== Summary ===
Election	Left V / VPK			Social Democrats S			Greens MP			Centre C			Liberals L / FP / F			Moderates M			Christian Democrats KD / KDS			Sweden Democrats SD		
Election	Votes	%	Seats	Votes	%	Seats	Votes	%	Seats	Votes	%	Seats	Votes	%	Seats	Votes	%	Seats	Votes	%	Seats	Votes	%	Seats
2026	2,799	6.74%	0	12,920	31.11%	1	3,274	7.88%	0	4,457	10.73%	0	2,193	5.28%	0	7,599	18.30%	1	2,175	5.24%	0	5,601	13.49%	0
2022	2,642	6.37%	0	14,361	34.64%	1	2,683	6.47%	0	4,858	11.72%	0	1,169	2.82%	0	6,969	16.81%	1	1,645	3.97%	0	6,504	15.69%	0
2018	3,704	9.01%	0	12,254	29.79%	1	2,037	4.95%	0	7,075	17.20%	1	1,539	3.74%	0	6,822	16.59%	0	1,699	4.13%	0	5,226	12.71%	0
2014	2,308	5.82%	0	12,774	32.21%	1	2,859	7.21%	0	5,317	13.41%	0	1,494	3.77%	0	8,450	21.31%	1	1,095	2.76%	0	3,259	8.22%	0
2010	2,342	6.06%	0	12,855	33.27%	1	3,259	8.43%	0	5,657	14.64%	0	1,785	4.62%	0	9,731	25.18%	1	1,128	2.92%	0	1,225	3.17%	0
2006	2,145	6.00%	0	12,464	34.86%	1	2,237	6.26%	0	6,883	19.25%	0	1,554	4.35%	0	7,715	21.58%	1	1,374	3.84%	0	566	1.58%	0
2002	2,911	8.48%	0	14,024	40.84%	2	1,898	5.53%	0	5,367	15.63%	0	2,701	7.87%	0	4,808	14.00%	0	2,242	6.53%	0	209	0.61%	0
1998	3,692	10.80%	0	11,885	34.75%	1	1,956	5.72%	0	5,119	14.97%	0	1,168	3.42%	0	6,572	19.22%	1	2,973	8.69%	0	122	0.36%	0
1994	1,926	5.20%	0	16,089	43.47%	2	2,486	6.72%	0	6,639	17.94%	0	1,671	4.52%	0	6,646	17.96%	0	937	2.53%	0			
1991	1,374	3.77%	0	13,208	36.23%	1	1,556	4.27%	0	7,532	20.66%	1	2,421	6.64%	0	6,105	16.75%	0	1,830	5.02%	0			
1988	1,508	4.15%	0	14,926	41.05%	1	2,485	6.83%	0	9,079	24.97%	1	2,871	7.90%	0	4,880	13.42%	0	555	1.53%	0			
1985	1,402	3.71%	0	15,791	41.81%	1	938	2.48%	0	9,204	24.37%	1	3,928	10.40%	0	6,437	17.04%	0	with C					
1982	1,400	3.72%	0	15,852	42.11%	1	852	2.26%	0	10,343	27.47%	1	1,903	5.05%	0	6,880	18.28%	0	381	1.01%	0			
1979	1,535	4.20%	0	14,175	38.75%	1				11,445	31.28%	1	3,177	8.68%	0	5,908	16.15%	0	235	0.64%	0			
1976	931	2.58%	0	13,594	37.65%	1				13,463	37.29%	1	2,999	8.31%	0	4,847	13.42%	0	230	0.64%	0			
1973	615	1.80%	0	12,722	37.21%	1				13,528	39.57%	1	2,506	7.33%	0	4,344	12.71%	0	332	0.97%	0			
1970	336	1.01%	0	12,766	38.39%	1				11,391	34.26%	1	4,430	13.32%	0	3,900	11.73%	0	305	0.92%	0			

(Excludes levelling seats. Figures in italics represent alliances/joint lists.)

=== Detailed ===
Party has received at least 4% of the vote nationally and is entitled to compete for constituency seats.

==== 2020s ====
===== 2026 =====
Results of the 2026 general election held on 13 September 2026:

Party		Votes	%	Seats		
Party		Votes	%	Con.	Lev.	Tot.
Swedish Social Democratic Party	S	12,920	31.11%	1	0	1
Moderate Party	M	7,599	18.30%	1	0	1
Sweden Democrats	SD	5,601	13.49%	0	0	0
Centre Party	C	4,457	10.73%	0	0	0
Green Party	MP	3,274	7.88%	0	0	0
Left Party	V	2,799	6.74%	0	0	0
Liberals	L	2,193	5.28%	0	0	0
Christian Democrats	KD	2,175	5.24%	0	0	0
Örebro Party	ÖP	155	0.37%	0	0	0
Alternative for Sweden	AfS	103	0.25%	0	0	0
Ambition Sweden	AS	87	0.21%	0	0	0
Human Rights and Democracy	MoD	29	0.07%	0	0	0
Turning Point Party	PV	24	0.06%	0	0	0
Independent Rural Party	LPo	23	0.06%	0	0	0
Pirate Party	PP	21	0.05%	0	0	0
Citizens' Coalition	MED	18	0.04%	0	0	0
Christian Values Party	KrVP	16	0.04%	0	0	0
United Voice	ER	13	0.03%	0	0	0
Direct Democrats	DD	5	0.01%	0	0	0
Communist Party of Sweden	SKP	4	0.01%	0	0	0
RegleraAI.nu		2	0.00%	0	0	0
Volt Sweden	Volt	2	0.00%	0	0	0
Communist Party	K	1	0.00%	0	0	0
Donald Duck Party		1	0.00%	0	0	0
Freedom of the Family		1	0.00%	0	0	0
Nordic Resistance Movement	NMR	1	0.00%	0	0	0
The Libertarians		1	0.00%	0	0	0
United Sweden		1	0.00%	0	0	0
Valid votes		41,526	100.00%	2	0	2
Blank votes		515	1.22%			
Rejected votes – unregistered parties		6	0.01%			
Rejected votes – other		47	0.11%			
Total polled		42,094	86.87%			
Registered electors		48,457				

The following candidates were elected:

- Constituency seats (personal mandates) - Meit Fohlin (S), 954 votes; and Jesper Skalberg Karlsson (M), 1,221 votes.

Permanent substitutions:

- Meit Fohlin (S) resigned on 6 October 2026 and was replaced by Filip Reinhag (S) on the same day.

===== 2022 =====
Results of the 2022 general election held on 11 September 2022:

Party		Votes	%	Seats		
Party		Votes	%	Con.	Lev.	Tot.
Swedish Social Democratic Party	S	14,361	34.64%	1	0	1
Moderate Party	M	6,969	16.81%	1	0	1
Sweden Democrats	SD	6,504	15.69%	0	0	0
Centre Party	C	4,858	11.72%	0	0	0
Green Party	MP	2,683	6.47%	0	0	0
Left Party	V	2,642	6.37%	0	0	0
Christian Democrats	KD	1,645	3.97%	0	0	0
Liberals	L	1,169	2.82%	0	0	0
Socialist Welfare Party	S-V	209	0.50%	0	0	0
Alternative for Sweden	AfS	82	0.20%	0	0	0
Independent Rural Party	LPo	54	0.13%	0	0	0
Human Rights and Democracy	MoD	53	0.13%	0	0	0
The Push Buttons	Kn	46	0.11%	0	0	0
Citizens' Coalition	MED	42	0.10%	0	0	0
Pirate Party	PP	33	0.08%	0	0	0
Feminist Initiative	FI	30	0.07%	0	0	0
Unity	ENH	23	0.06%	0	0	0
Climate Alliance	KA	17	0.04%	0	0	0
Direct Democrats	DD	10	0.02%	0	0	0
Christian Values Party	KrVP	9	0.02%	0	0	0
Turning Point Party	PV	7	0.02%	0	0	0
Nordic Resistance Movement	NMR	5	0.01%	0	0	0
Nuance Party	PNy	5	0.01%	0	0	0
Basic Income Party	BASIP	1	0.00%	0	0	0
Communist Party of Sweden	SKP	1	0.00%	0	0	0
Evil Chicken Party	OKP	1	0.00%	0	0	0
Valid votes		41,459	100.00%	2	0	2
Blank votes		533	1.27%			
Rejected votes – unregistered parties		8	0.02%			
Rejected votes – other		47	0.11%			
Total polled		42,047	87.10%			
Registered electors		48,274				

The following candidates were elected:

- Constituency seats (personal mandates) - Jesper Skalberg Karlsson (M), 1,357 votes; and Hanna Westerén (S), 1,602 votes.

==== 2010s ====
===== 2018 =====
Results of the 2018 general election held on 9 September 2018:

Party		Votes	%	Seats		
Party		Votes	%	Con.	Lev.	Tot.
Swedish Social Democratic Party	S	12,254	29.79%	1	0	1
Centre Party	C	7,075	17.20%	1	0	1
Moderate Party	M	6,822	16.59%	0	0	0
Sweden Democrats	SD	5,226	12.71%	0	0	0
Left Party	V	3,704	9.01%	0	0	0
Green Party	MP	2,037	4.95%	0	0	0
Christian Democrats	KD	1,699	4.13%	0	0	0
Liberals	L	1,539	3.74%	0	0	0
Feminist Initiative	FI	388	0.94%	0	0	0
Independent Rural Party	LPo	65	0.16%	0	0	0
Alternative for Sweden	AfS	64	0.16%	0	0	0
Citizens' Coalition	MED	55	0.13%	0	0	0
Unity	ENH	51	0.12%	0	0	0
Direct Democrats	DD	43	0.10%	0	0	0
Animals' Party	DjuP	37	0.09%	0	0	0
Pirate Party	PP	31	0.08%	0	0	0
Nordic Resistance Movement	NMR	16	0.04%	0	0	0
Basic Income Party	BASIP	7	0.02%	0	0	0
Christian Values Party	KrVP	5	0.01%	0	0	0
Classical Liberal Party	KLP	4	0.01%	0	0	0
Security Party	TRP	2	0.00%	0	0	0
Parties not on the ballot	ÖVR	5	0.01%	0	0	0
Valid votes		41,129	100.00%	2	0	2
Blank votes		426	1.02%			
Rejected votes – unregistered parties		13	0.03%			
Rejected votes – other		30	0.07%			
Total polled		41,598	88.75%			
Registered electors		46,871				

The following candidates were elected:

- Constituency seats (personal mandates) - Lars Thomsson (C), 1,111 votes; and Hanna Westerén (S), 1,243 votes.

===== 2014 =====
Results of the 2014 general election held on 14 September 2014:

Party		Votes	%	Seats		
Party		Votes	%	Con.	Lev.	Tot.
Swedish Social Democratic Party	S	12,774	32.21%	1	0	1
Moderate Party	M	8,450	21.31%	1	0	1
Centre Party	C	5,317	13.41%	0	0	0
Sweden Democrats	SD	3,259	8.22%	0	0	0
Green Party	MP	2,859	7.21%	0	0	0
Left Party	V	2,308	5.82%	0	0	0
Feminist Initiative	FI	1,764	4.45%	0	0	0
Liberal People's Party	FP	1,494	3.77%	0	0	0
Christian Democrats	KD	1,095	2.76%	0	0	0
Pirate Party	PP	202	0.51%	0	0	0
Unity	ENH	48	0.12%	0	0	0
Animals' Party	DjuP	19	0.05%	0	0	0
Party of the Swedes	SVP	17	0.04%	0	0	0
Christian Values Party	KrVP	10	0.03%	0	0	0
Independent Rural Party	LBPo	10	0.03%	0	0	0
Direct Democrats		4	0.01%	0	0	0
Classical Liberal Party	KLP	3	0.01%	0	0	0
Health Party		1	0.00%	0	0	0
Parties not on the ballot		21	0.05%	0	0	0
Valid votes		39,655	100.00%	2	0	2
Blank votes		498	1.24%			
Rejected votes – other		22	0.05%			
Total polled		40,175	86.46%			
Registered electors		46,466				

The following candidates were elected:

- Constituency seats (personal mandates) - Christer Engelhardt (S), 1,548 votes; and Gustaf Hoffstedt (M), 1,414 votes.

Permanent substitutions:

- Gustaf Hoffstedt (M) resigned on 18 January 2015 and was replaced by Jesper Skalberg Karlsson (M) on 19 January 2015.
- Christer Engelhardt (S) resigned on 31 January 2015 and was replaced by Hanna Westerén (S) on 1 February 2015.

===== 2010 =====
Results of the 2010 general election held on 19 September 2010:

Party		Votes	%	Seats		
Party		Votes	%	Con.	Lev.	Tot.
Swedish Social Democratic Party	S	12,855	33.27%	1	0	1
Moderate Party	M	9,731	25.18%	1	0	1
Centre Party	C	5,657	14.64%	0	0	0
Green Party	MP	3,259	8.43%	0	0	0
Left Party	V	2,342	6.06%	0	0	0
Liberal People's Party	FP	1,785	4.62%	0	0	0
Sweden Democrats	SD	1,225	3.17%	0	0	0
Christian Democrats	KD	1,128	2.92%	0	0	0
Pirate Party	PP	308	0.80%	0	0	0
Feminist Initiative	FI	303	0.78%	0	0	0
National Democrats	ND	13	0.03%	0	0	0
Unity	ENH	5	0.01%	0	0	0
Classical Liberal Party	KLP	4	0.01%	0	0	0
Party of the Swedes	SVP	3	0.01%	0	0	0
Spirits Party		3	0.01%	0	0	0
Communist Party of Sweden	SKP	1	0.00%	0	0	0
European Workers Party	EAP	1	0.00%	0	0	0
Freedom Party		1	0.00%	0	0	0
Rural Democrats		1	0.00%	0	0	0
Swedish Senior Citizen Interest Party	SPI	1	0.00%	0	0	0
Parties not on the ballot		14	0.04%	0	0	0
Valid votes		38,640	100.00%	2	0	2
Blank votes		571	1.45%			
Rejected votes – other		46	0.12%			
Total polled		39,257	84.90%			
Registered electors		46,237				

The following candidates were elected:

- Constituency seats (personal mandates) - Christer Engelhardt (S), 2,265 votes; and Gustaf Hoffstedt (M), 1,762 votes.

==== 2000s ====
===== 2006 =====
Results of the 2006 general election held on 17 September 2006:

Party		Votes	%	Seats		
Party		Votes	%	Con.	Lev.	Tot.
Swedish Social Democratic Party	S	12,464	34.86%	1	0	1
Moderate Party	M	7,715	21.58%	1	0	1
Centre Party	C	6,883	19.25%	0	0	0
Green Party	MP	2,237	6.26%	0	0	0
Left Party	V	2,145	6.00%	0	0	0
Liberal People's Party	FP	1,554	4.35%	0	0	0
Christian Democrats	KD	1,374	3.84%	0	0	0
Sweden Democrats	SD	566	1.58%	0	0	0
Feminist Initiative	FI	332	0.93%	0	0	0
Pirate Party	PP	245	0.69%	0	0	0
Swedish Senior Citizen Interest Party	SPI	100	0.28%	0	0	0
June List	JL	75	0.21%	0	0	0
Unity	ENH	15	0.04%	0	0	0
People's Will		9	0.03%	0	0	0
Health Care Party	Sjvåp	8	0.02%	0	0	0
The Sheepdog Party		6	0.02%	0	0	0
Classical Liberal Party	KLP	3	0.01%	0	0	0
New Future	NYF	3	0.01%	0	0	0
National Democrats	ND	2	0.01%	0	0	0
National Socialist Front	NSF	2	0.01%	0	0	0
Active Democracy		1	0.00%	0	0	0
Communist Party of Sweden	SKP	1	0.00%	0	0	0
Nordic Union		1	0.00%	0	0	0
Unique Party		1	0.00%	0	0	0
Parties not on the ballot		8	0.02%	0	0	0
Valid votes		35,750	100.00%	2	0	2
Blank votes		1,000	2.72%			
Rejected votes – other		30	0.08%			
Total polled		36,780	81.36%			
Registered electors		45,205				

The following candidates were elected:

- Constituency seats (personal mandates) - Rolf K. Nilsson (M), 915 votes.
- Constituency seats (party mandates) - Christer Engelhardt (S), 967 votes.

===== 2002 =====
Results of the 2002 general election held on 15 September 2002:

Party		Votes	%	Seats		
Party		Votes	%	Con.	Lev.	Tot.
Swedish Social Democratic Party	S	14,024	40.84%	2	0	2
Centre Party	C	5,367	15.63%	0	0	0
Moderate Party	M	4,808	14.00%	0	0	0
Left Party	V	2,911	8.48%	0	0	0
Liberal People's Party	FP	2,701	7.87%	0	0	0
Christian Democrats	KD	2,242	6.53%	0	0	0
Green Party	MP	1,898	5.53%	0	0	0
Sweden Democrats	SD	209	0.61%	0	0	0
Swedish Senior Citizen Interest Party	SPI	108	0.31%	0	0	0
Socialist Party	SOC.P	11	0.03%	0	0	0
New Future	NYF	5	0.01%	0	0	0
Socialist Justice Party	RS	3	0.01%	0	0	0
Unity	ENH	2	0.01%	0	0	0
The Communists	KOMM	1	0.00%	0	0	0
Other parties	ÖVR	46	0.13%	0	0	0
Valid votes		34,336	100.00%	2	0	2
Rejected votes		742	2.12%			
Total polled		35,078	79.07%			
Registered electors		44,364				

The following candidates were elected:

- Constituency seats (personal mandates) - Lilian Virgin (S), 1,420 votes.
- Constituency seats (party mandates) - Christer Engelhardt (S), 858 votes.

==== 1990s ====
===== 1998 =====
Results of the 1998 general election held on 20 September 1998:

Party		Votes	%	Seats		
Party		Votes	%	Con.	Lev.	Tot.
Swedish Social Democratic Party	S	11,885	34.75%	1	0	1
Moderate Party	M	6,572	19.22%	1	0	1
Centre Party	C	5,119	14.97%	0	0	0
Left Party	V	3,692	10.80%	0	0	0
Christian Democrats	KD	2,973	8.69%	0	0	0
Green Party	MP	1,956	5.72%	0	0	0
Liberal People's Party	FP	1,168	3.42%	0	0	0
Gotland Party Gotland's Future		405	1.18%	0	0	0
New Democracy	NyD	165	0.48%	0	0	0
Sweden Democrats	SD	122	0.36%	0	0	0
The New Party	d	75	0.22%	0	0	0
Unity	ENH	17	0.05%	0	0	0
Swedish Senior Citizen Interest Party	SPI	9	0.03%	0	0	0
New Future	NYF	8	0.02%	0	0	0
Natural Law Party		4	0.01%	0	0	0
Socialist Justice Party	RS	2	0.01%	0	0	0
Centre Democrats	CD	1	0.00%	0	0	0
Other parties		28	0.08%	0	0	0
Valid votes		34,201	100.00%	2	0	2
Rejected votes		916	2.61%			
Total polled		35,117	79.81%			
Registered electors		44,000				

The following candidates were elected:

- Constituency seats (personal mandates) - Roy Hansson (M), 1,313 votes; and Lilian Virgin (S), 1,300 votes.

===== 1994 =====
Results of the 1994 general election held on 18 September 1994:

Party		Votes	%	Seats		
Party		Votes	%	Con.	Lev.	Tot.
Swedish Social Democratic Party	S	16,089	43.47%	2	0	2
Moderate Party	M	6,646	17.96%	0	0	0
Centre Party	C	6,639	17.94%	0	0	0
Green Party	MP	2,486	6.72%	0	0	0
Left Party	V	1,926	5.20%	0	0	0
Liberal People's Party	FP	1,671	4.52%	0	0	0
Christian Democratic Unity	KDS	937	2.53%	0	0	0
New Democracy	NyD	471	1.27%	0	0	0
Other parties		144	0.39%	0	0	0
Valid votes		37,009	100.00%	2	0	2
Rejected votes		682	1.81%			
Total polled		37,691	86.06%			
Registered electors		43,795				

The following candidates were elected: Claes-Göran Larsson (S); and Lilian Virgin (S).

Permanent substitutions:

- Claes-Göran Larsson (S) died in the sinking of the MS Estonia on 28 September 1994. He formally lost his seat in the Riksdag on 28 November 1994 following the issue of his death certificate and was replaced by Ingibjörg Sigurdsdóttir (S) on 29 November 1994.

===== 1991 =====
Results of the 1991 general election held on 15 September 1991:

Party		Votes	%	Seats		
Party		Votes	%	Con.	Lev.	Tot.
Swedish Social Democratic Party	S	13,208	36.23%	1	0	1
Centre Party	C	7,532	20.66%	1	0	1
Moderate Party	M	6,105	16.75%	0	0	0
Liberal People's Party	FP	2,421	6.64%	0	0	0
New Democracy	NyD	2,350	6.45%	0	0	0
Christian Democratic Unity	KDS	1,830	5.02%	0	0	0
Green Party	MP	1,556	4.27%	0	0	0
Left Party	V	1,374	3.77%	0	0	0
Other parties		82	0.22%	0	0	0
Valid votes		36,458	100.00%	2	0	2
Rejected votes		789	2.12%			
Total polled		37,247	85.86%			
Registered electors		43,379				

The following candidates were elected: Gunhild Bolander (C); and Ulla Pettersson (S).

==== 1980s ====
===== 1988 =====
Results of the 1988 general election held on 18 September 1988:

Party		Votes	%	Seats		
Party		Votes	%	Con.	Lev.	Tot.
Swedish Social Democratic Party	S	14,926	41.05%	1	0	1
Centre Party	C	9,079	24.97%	1	0	1
Moderate Party	M	4,880	13.42%	0	0	0
Liberal People's Party	FP	2,871	7.90%	0	0	0
Green Party	MP	2,485	6.83%	0	0	0
Left Party – Communists	VPK	1,508	4.15%	0	0	0
Christian Democratic Unity	KDS	555	1.53%	0	0	0
Other parties		58	0.16%	0	0	0
Valid votes		36,362	100.00%	2	0	2
Rejected votes		492	1.33%			
Total polled		36,854	85.81%			
Registered electors		42,948				

The following candidates were elected: Gunhild Bolander (C); and Ulla Pettersson (S).

===== 1985 =====
Results of the 1985 general election held on 15 September 1985:

Party		Votes	%	Seats		
Party		Votes	%	Con.	Lev.	Tot.
Swedish Social Democratic Party	S	15,791	41.81%	1	0	1
Centre Party	C	9,204	24.37%	1	0	1
Moderate Party	M	6,437	17.04%	0	0	0
Liberal People's Party	FP	3,928	10.40%	0	0	0
Left Party – Communists	VPK	1,402	3.71%	0	0	0
Green Party	MP	938	2.48%	0	0	0
Other parties		66	0.17%	0	0	0
Valid votes		37,766	100.00%	2	0	2
Rejected votes		442	1.16%			
Total polled		38,208	88.89%			
Registered electors		42,982				

The following candidates were elected: Gunhild Bolander (C); and Ulla Pettersson (S).

===== 1982 =====
Results of the 1982 general election held on 19 September 1982:

Party		Votes	%	Seats		
Party		Votes	%	Con.	Lev.	Tot.
Swedish Social Democratic Party	S	15,852	42.11%	1	0	1
Centre Party	C	10,343	27.47%	1	0	1
Moderate Party	M	6,880	18.28%	0	0	0
Liberal People's Party	FP	1,903	5.05%	0	0	0
Left Party – Communists	VPK	1,400	3.72%	0	0	0
Green Party	MP	852	2.26%	0	0	0
Christian Democratic Unity	KDS	381	1.01%	0	0	0
K-Party	K-P	4	0.01%	0	0	0
Other parties		31	0.08%	0	0	0
Valid votes		37,646	100.00%	2	0	2
Rejected votes		406	1.07%			
Total polled		38,052	90.59%			
Registered electors		42,003				

The following candidates were elected: Gunhild Bolander (C); and Per-Axel Nilsson (S).

==== 1970s ====
===== 1979 =====
Results of the 1979 general election held on 16 September 1979:

Party		Votes	%	Seats		
Party		Votes	%	Con.	Lev.	Tot.
Swedish Social Democratic Party	S	14,175	38.75%	1	0	1
Centre Party	C	11,445	31.28%	1	0	1
Moderate Party	M	5,908	16.15%	0	0	0
Liberal People's Party	FP	3,177	8.68%	0	0	0
Left Party – Communists	VPK	1,535	4.20%	0	0	0
Christian Democratic Unity	KDS	235	0.64%	0	0	0
Communist Party of Sweden	SKP	45	0.12%	0	0	0
Other parties		65	0.18%	0	0	0
Valid votes		36,585	100.00%	2	0	2
Rejected votes		317	0.86%			
Total polled		36,902	89.98%			
Registered electors		41,011				

The following candidates were elected: Torsten Gustafsson (C); and Per-Axel Nilsson (S).

===== 1976 =====
Results of the 1976 general election held on 19 September 1976:

Party		Votes	%	Seats		
Party		Votes	%	Con.	Lev.	Tot.
Swedish Social Democratic Party	S	13,594	37.65%	1	0	1
Centre Party	C	13,463	37.29%	1	0	1
Moderate Party	M	4,847	13.42%	0	0	0
People's Party	F	2,999	8.31%	0	0	0
Left Party – Communists	VPK	931	2.58%	0	0	0
Christian Democratic Unity	KDS	230	0.64%	0	0	0
Other parties		41	0.11%	0	0	0
Valid votes		36,105	100.00%	2	0	2
Rejected votes		262	0.72%			
Total polled		36,367	90.74%			
Registered electors		40,079				

The following candidates were elected: Torsten Gustafsson (C); and Per-Axel Nilsson (S).

===== 1973 =====
Results of the 1973 general election held on 16 September 1973:

Party		Votes	%	Seats		
Party		Votes	%	Con.	Lev.	Tot.
Centre Party	C	13,528	39.57%	1	0	1
Swedish Social Democratic Party	S	12,722	37.21%	1	0	1
Moderate Party	M	4,344	12.71%	0	0	0
People's Party	F	2,506	7.33%	0	0	0
Left Party – Communists	VPK	615	1.80%	0	0	0
Christian Democratic Unity	KDS	332	0.97%	0	0	0
Communist League Marxist–Leninists (the revolutionaries)	KFML(r)	94	0.27%	0	0	0
Communist Party of Sweden	SKP	39	0.11%	0	0	0
Other parties		6	0.02%	0	0	0
Valid votes		34,186	100.00%	2	0	2
Rejected votes		96	0.28%			
Total polled		34,282	90.24%			
Registered electors		37,990				

The following candidates were elected: Torsten Gustafsson (C); and Per-Axel Nilsson (S).

===== 1970 =====
Results of the 1970 general election held on 20 September 1970:

Party		Votes	%	Seats		
Party		Votes	%	Con.	Lev.	Tot.
Swedish Social Democratic Party	S	12,766	38.39%	1	0	1
Centre Party	C	11,391	34.26%	1	0	1
People's Party	F	4,430	13.32%	0	0	0
Moderate Party	M	3,900	11.73%	0	0	0
Left Party – Communists	VPK	336	1.01%	0	0	0
Christian Democratic Unity	KDS	305	0.92%	0	0	0
Communist League Marxists-Leninists	KFML	102	0.31%	0	0	0
Other parties		21	0.06%	0	0	0
Valid votes		33,251	100.00%	2	0	2
Rejected votes		69	0.21%			
Total polled inc. postal votes		33,320	87.62%			
Registered electors		38,030				

The following candidates were elected: Torsten Gustafsson (C); and Georg Pettersson (S).

Permanent substitutions:

- Georg Pettersson (S) died on 22 June 1972 and was replaced by Per-Axel Nilsson (S) on 12 July 1972.
