= Filip Reinhag =

Swedish politician (born 1984)

Member of the Riksdag
- Incumbent
- Assumed office 6 October 2026
- Preceded by: Meit Fohlin
- Constituency: Gotland County

Personal details
- Born: 1984 (age 41–42) Sweden
- Party: Swedish Social Democratic Party

Filip Thomas Reinhag (born 1984) is a Swedish politician from the Social Democratic Party. He has been a member of the Riksdag since 6 October 2026 for the Gotland County constituency.

== Education and professional life ==
Reinhag holds a Bachelor of Arts degree in European Studies from the University of Gothenburg. He has also pursued master's studies in international administration and global governance at the same university.

He has worked as an EU coordinator at the LO-TCO Aid Committee and as a program officer at the International Center for Local Democracy (ICLD). At the County Administrative Board of Gotland County, he has been an officer in human rights and a special expert in gender equality.

== Political career ==
Reinhag became a regional councilor in Region Gotland in 2017. He has been chairman of the region's culture and leisure committee and became chairman of the health and medical care committee in January 2023.

=== European cooperation ===
On 3 October 2024, Reinhag was elected as the president of the European regional network Conference of Peripheral Maritime Regions (CPMR) for a two-year term. He had previously represented Gotland in the organization for seven years and been a member of its political bureau for two years.

=== Riksdagsledamot ===
After the 2026 Swedish general election, Reinhag was appointed as a member of parliament after Meit Fohlin resigned from the parliamentary mission to continue as chairman of the regional board on Gotland. He took office on 6 October 2026.

== See also ==
- List of members of the Riksdag, 2026–2030
