= Einar Gustafsson =

Swedish farmer, politician and county governor

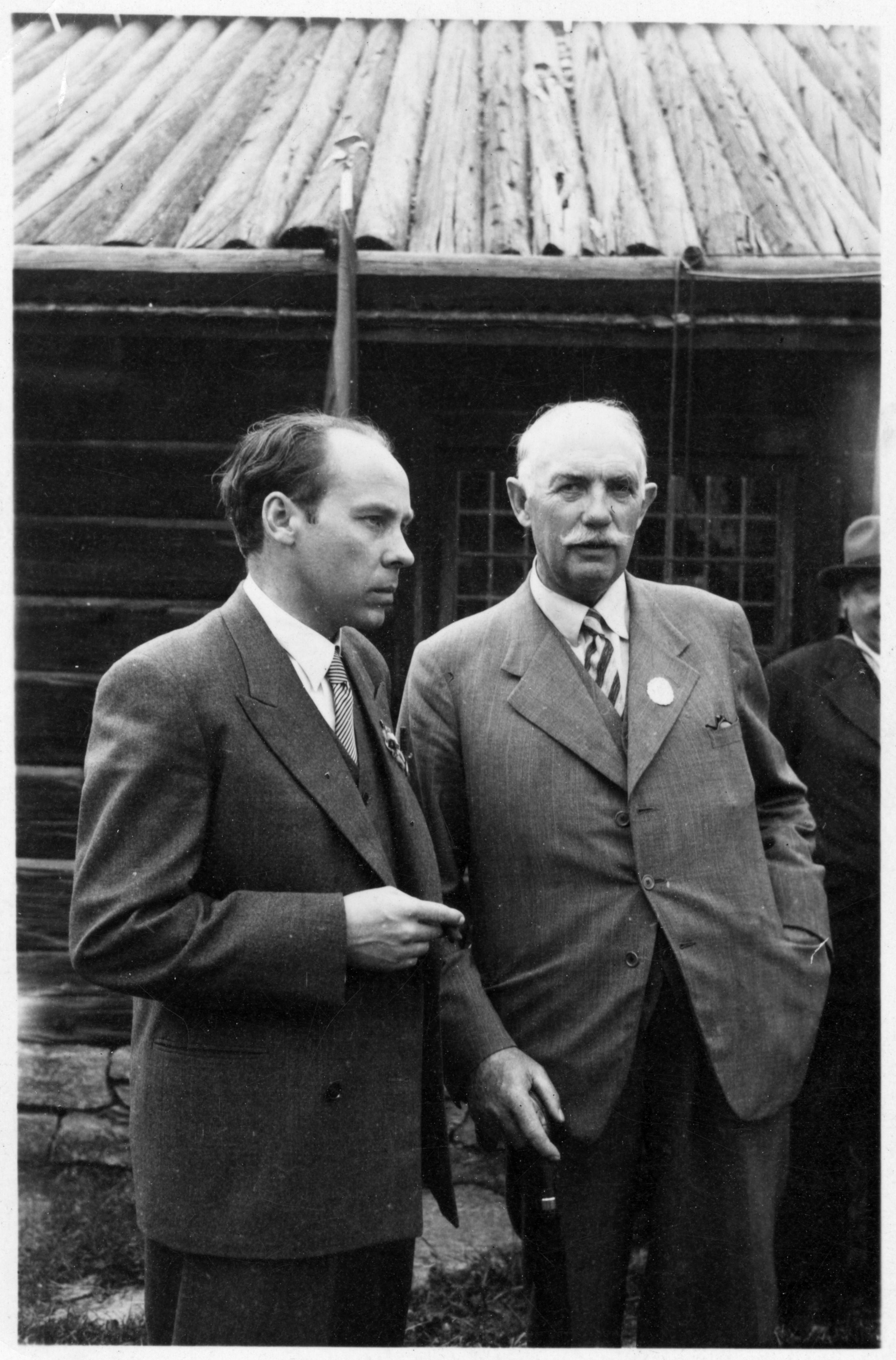
Gustafsson (left) together with Axel Pehrsson-Bramstorp.

Gustaf Einar Gustafsson (21 December 1914 – 15 February 1995) was a Swedish farmer and politician. He was a member of the Centre Party and was Governor of Gotland County from 1975 to 1980.

== Early life ==
Gustafsson was born on 21 December 1914 in Loftahammar, Sweden, the son of Carl Gustafsson and his wife Ebba (née Edlund). He was the brother of Centre Party politician Torsten Gustafsson who served as Minister of Defence from 1981 to 1982. He was educated at both Gamleby and Osby Agricultural Schools, after which he worked as a supervisory assistant for a few years.

== Career ==
During World War II there was something called the Jordbrukshjälpen ("Agricultural Aid"). In this, Gustafsson was active in Finland in the early 1940s. He also played a decisive role in the acquisition of Mälsåker outside Stockholm, which became a place for Norwegian refugees. During his emergency service at Ven, he also had contact with Danish refugees. He became national ombudsman of the Swedish Rural Youth League in 1942 and federal secretary of the same in 1946. Gustafsson was director of Mem Castle from 1948 to 1958. Gustafsson was a member of the State Council for Assembly Rooms (Statens nämnd för samlingslokaler) in 1942, the Radio Council (Radionämnden) and its working committee in 1948. Furthermore, he was a member of the Municipal Council from 1951 to 1958 (and 1971 to 1974) as well as the People's School Board (Folkskolestyrelsen) from 1951 to 1963. He was also a member of Andra kammaren for the Centre Party from 1957 to 1968.

Gustafsson was a member of the Mentally Ill legislation Committee (Sinnessjuklagstiftningskommittéen) from 1957 to 1964, the Aviation Investigation (Luftfartsutredningen) in 1963, the Nordic Council in 1963 and the Guardianship Investigation (Förmyndarskapsutredningen) in 1965. He was also active in the Landstorm and was a member of its administration committee from 1963 to 1974. Gustafsson was County Council Commissioner (Landstingsråd) in Östergötland County from 1969 to 1974 and a member of the Kommunstyrelse from 1971 to 1974. He was then Governor of Gotland County from 1975 to 1980. During this time he, together with his wife Barbro, transformed the governor residence in Visby into a pleasant gathering place for both locals and mainlanders. As a governor, Gustafsson became chairman of Sweden's oldest rural Economy and agricultural society and the following year also chairman of the Swedish Rural Economy and Agricultural Societies (Hushållningssällskapens Förbund). He left this assignment in 1983 but until a few years before his death, he participated in the annual recurring union meetings in different parts of the country. During his time as governor, Gustafsson was appointed chairman of Gotland's district of the Swedish Red Cross in 1975.

== Personal life ==
On 26 September 1942 he married Barbro Månson (1912–2009), the daughter of C.E. Månson and Signe (née Böttinger). He was the father of Karl (born 1947).

Gustafsson leased Kårby farm at Lake Boren in Fornåsa from 1958. Here Gustafsson got the opportunity to develop his great interest in farming with animal husbandry - an interest he followed up long after his retirement.

Gustafsson died on 15 February 1995 in Linköping.

== Awards and decorations ==
- Knight of the Order of the Polar Star
- Commander of the Order of the Lion of Finland

Preceded by Torsten Andersson	Governor of Gotland County; 1975–1980	Succeeded by Lars Westerberg
