= Meit Fohlin =

Swedish politician (born 1971)

Member of the Riksdag
- In office 28 September 2026 – 6 October 2026
- Succeeded by: Filip Reinhag
- Constituency: Gotland County

Personal details
- Born: 1971 (age 54–55) Stockholm, Sweden
- Party: Swedish Social Democratic Party

Meit Fohlin (born 1971) is a Swedish politician from the Social Democratic Party. Since 2017, she has been the chairwoman of the regional board of Region Gotland.

Fohlin has held political positions for the Social Democrats since 2007 and has previously worked as a principal. She has a post-secondary education of three years or more.

In the 2026 Swedish general election, Fohlin received the most votes on the Social Democrats' list in the Gotland County constituency, but chose to forgo her parliamentary seat to continue as the chairwoman of the Gotland regional board. Her decision meant that Filip Reinhag took the seat in the Riksdag.

== See also ==
- List of members of the Riksdag, 2026–2030
