= Lilian Virgin =

Swedish politician (born 1939)

Member of the Riksdag
- In office 3 October 1994 – 2 October 2006
- Constituency: Gotland County

Personal details
- Born: 1939 (age 86–87)
- Party: Social Democratic Party

Lilian Virgin (born 1939) is a Swedish politician and former member of the Riksdag, the national legislature. A member of the Social Democratic Party, she represented Gotland County between October 1994 and October 2006.
