= Torsten Gustafsson =

Swedish politician (1920–1994)

Torsten Gustafsson (22 February 1920 – 14 January 1994) was a Swedish politician. He was a member of the Centre Party. Gustafsson served as the Minister of Defence from 1981 to 1982. He was the brother of Einar Gustafsson.
