= Christer Engelhardt =

Swedish politician (born 1969)

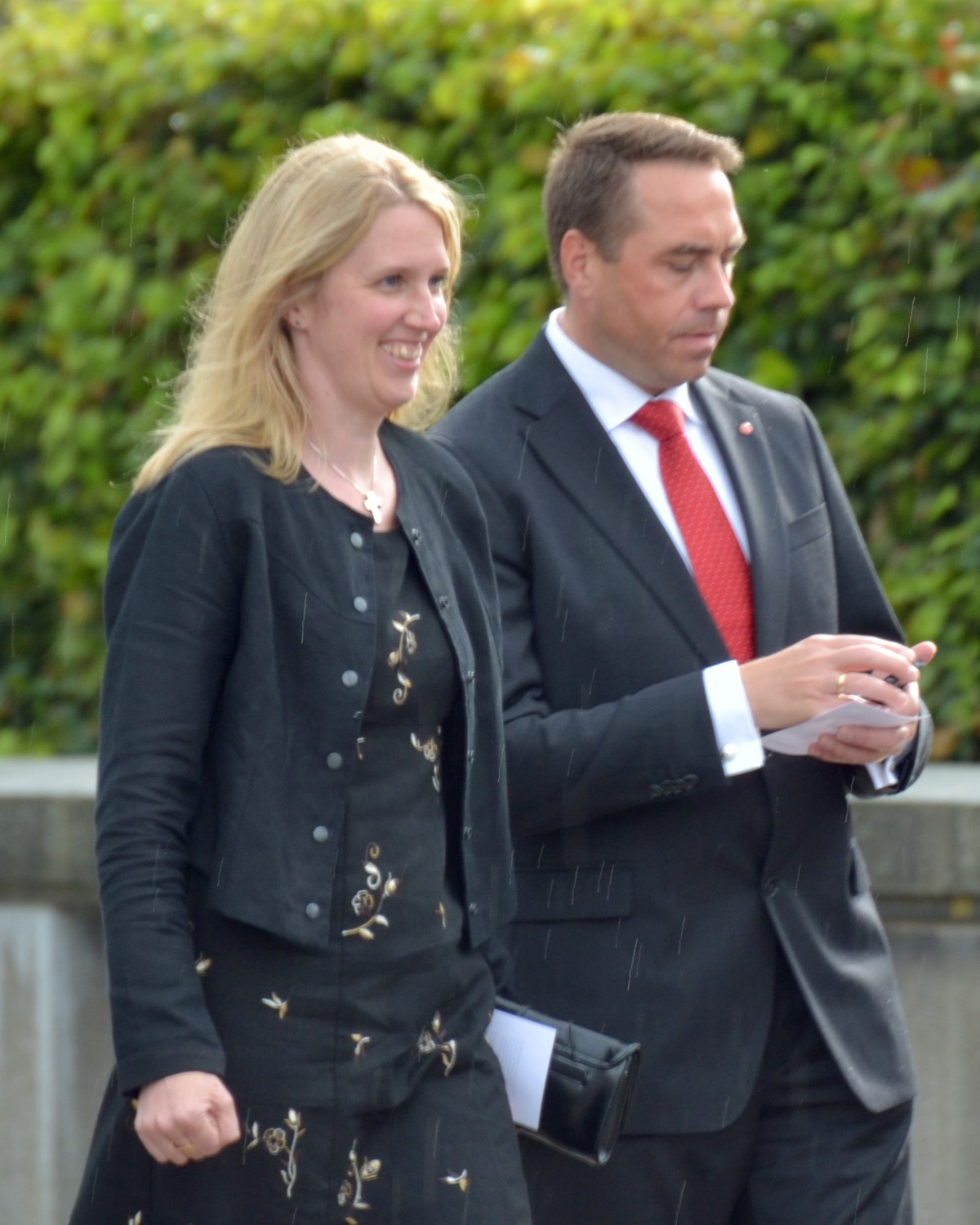
- Christer Engelhardt with his wife Maria Engelhardt

member of the Riksdag
- In office 2002–2015

Personal details
- Born: 23 October 1969 (age 56) Region Gotland
- Party: Social Democratic

Christer Engelhardt (born 23 October 1969 in Region Gotland) is a Swedish Social Democratic politician who was a member of the Riksdag from 2002 to 2014. He is a forme member of the Riksdag's Social Affairs Committee and is chairman of the church council in Visby.

As of 2014, he resigned all his political assignments, both in the Riksdag and in the Gotland Regional Council. He was succeeded by Hanna Westerén.
