= Louise Erickson =

Louise Erickson may refer to:

- Louise Erickson (baseball) (1929–2016), American pitcher
- Louise Erickson (actress) (1928–2019), American actress
- Louise Eriksen (born 1995), Danish footballer

== See also ==
- Louise Erixon (born 1989), Swedish politician
