= Mikael Jansson =

Mikael Jansson may refer to:

- Mikael Jansson (politician) (born 1965), Swedish politician
- Mikael Jansson (photographer) (born 1958), Swedish fashion photographer
