= Conservative Party (Sweden) =

Swedish nationalist party

Conservative Party Konservativa partiet
- Chairman: Tommy Rydén
- Founded: April 1995
- Dissolved: 1999
- Split from: Sweden Democrats
- Newspaper: Grindvakten
- Ideology: Ethnic nationalism Neo-Nazism
- Political position: Far-right

The Conservative Party (Swedish: Konservativa partiet) previously known as the Homeland Party (Swedish: Hembygdspartiet, HbP), was a Swedish political party founded in April 1995 as a breakaway from the Sweden Democrats. The founders were Leif Zeilon, who broke with the Sweden Democrats in connection with the election of Mikael Jansson as party leader, and Leif Larsson, who had previously been the leader of the Nordic Realm Party's "national action group" and the Association of Sweden's Future.

In 1997, the name was changed to the Conservative Party, because there was already a party called the Homeland Party. In 1998, the party drew attention when it started an electoral collaboration with New Democracy under the leadership of John Bouvin, which contributed to Bouvin being removed from the post as party leader. The Conservative Party had between 200 and 300 members, received 163 votes (0.36%) in the municipal election in Huddinge municipality in 1998 and was dissolved the following year.

== Ideology ==
Despite the fact that both founders had a past within Nazi organizations, it was denied that the Conservative Party had such connections. Leif Larsson called the party "patriotic", but it was classified as Nazi by Expo. The party wanted to create an image of itself that was separate from Nazi influences and considered itself similar to the German People's Union party. Party issues that were pursued were a total stop for refugees from other parts of the world and active resettlement for those who had already arrived in Sweden. The party's symbol was a so-called hagal rune and its message was summarized on stickers and posters with slogans such as "Stop the immigration-Keep Sweden Swedish", "Racial mixing? No thanks!" and "No mosques in Sweden!". The party also had a newspaper called Grindvakten.

== See also ==
- National Democrats (2001–2014)
- Alternative for Sweden
