= Sweden Party =

Sweden Party Sverigepartiet
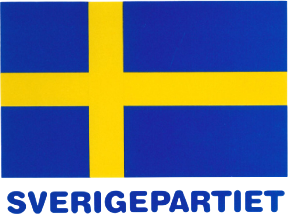
- Abbreviation: SvP
- Chairman: Stefan Herrmann
- Deputy chairman: Sven Davidson
- Founders: Stefan Herrmann; Sven Davidson; Leif Zeilon
- Founded: 16 November 1986
- Dissolved: 8 February 1988
- Merger of: Bevara Sverige Svenskt; Progress Party (Stockholm branch)
- Succeeded by: Sweden Democrats
- Newspaper: Svensk Tidning
- Ideology: Right-wing populism Anti-immigration; Factions: Neo-Nazism; National conservatism
- Political position: Far-right
- Colours: Blue; Yellow

Sweden Party (Swedish: Sverigepartiet) was a far-right political party in Sweden. It was founded in late 1986 through the merger of Bevara Sverige Svenskt and the Stockholm branch of the Progress Party. The leader of the party was Stefan Herrmann, formerly the leader of the Progress Party.

In October 1987, Herrmann was expelled from the party. His group reconstituted the Progress Party. The remainder of the party would regroup as the Sweden Democrats in 1988.

== History and ideology ==
The Sweden Party was formed in 1986 after a meeting in Stockholm. Its founders included Stefan Hermann, Leif Zeilon and Sven Davidson who were active in the Bevara Sverige Svenskt organization. The party never officially ran for election and during the 1988 Swedish general election advocated boycotting the main parties, stating "DO NOT VOTE for the traitors in the 1988 election" and used symbols associated with white power movements. The party was formally dissolved in 1988, with some of its members playing a role in the founding of the Sweden Democrats which emerged as a successor.

In its policies, the Sweden Party was critical of immigration into Sweden and argued that a market economy was superior to a planned economy, but also advocated for certain protectionist measures such as limiting the power of foreign companies in Sweden and breaking up what it called the "power of big finance." Swedish historian Heléne Lööw has argued that the Sweden Party did not hold a coherent ideology and was internally polarized between two groups; those sympathetic to neo-Nazi ideas and a more conventional right-wing populist and national conservative faction.
