= Karl-Olov Arnstberg =

Swedish ethologist and writer

Karl-Olov Arnstberg (born 24 September 1943) is a Swedish ethnologist and writer. He was a professor at the Stockholm University from 1995 until his retirement in 2008. His academic career began in the 1960s when he became an assistant to the ethnologist Sigurd Erixon. He attained a Doctor of Philosophy degree in ethnology in 1977.

Arnstberg has written several studies and monographs on Romani culture and the history of the Romani people in Sweden. His 1998 book Svenskar och zigenare ("Swedes and Gypsies") became controversial as Arnstberg treated the widespread criminality within the Romani community and how attempts to assimilate or integrate the Romani into the Swedish society have consistently failed. In the 2005 essay collection Typiskt svenskt ("typically Swedish") he treated the Swedish identity and its relationship and attitudes to concepts such nationalism, history, culture, prostitution, honour, immigrants, youth, masculinity, violence and political correctness.

In his 2013 pamphlet Invandring och mörkläggning ("immigration and cover-up"), co-written with the journalist Gunnar Sandelin, he criticised the immigration policies of Sweden and argued that the mainstream media consciously have withheld relevant information on the subject. The ethnographer and rabbi Dan Korn criticised the book for its lack of a clearly stated agenda. "They write that the large immigration threatens the Swedish ethnicity", Korn wrote, "Then it would have been valuable if they had arrived with some kind of manifesto. Why is it wrong that the Swedish ethnicity is threatened?" The book was followed by a sequel in 2014, Invandring och mörkläggning II. Arnstberg and Sandelin also run a political blog with the same title as the book series.

After being invited to a seminar in the Riksdag on freedom of speech by MP Anna Hagwall, he was criticised as antisemitic for blog entries which stated that Jewish intellectuals have a "hidden agenda to once and for all tear down the hegemony of the Western white elite".

In addition to his other writings, Arnstberg wrote and published several novels the 1970s and 1980s.
