= Bevara Sverige Svenskt =

Swedish far-right wing organization

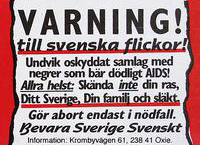
Sticker from BSS warning Swedish girls not to shame their race by having sex with "negroes".

Early campaign sticker of the Sweden Democrats using the Keep Sweden Swedish slogan.

Bevara Sverige Svenskt (pronounced [bɛˈvɑ̌ːra ˈsvæ̌rjɛ ˈsvɛnːskt]; BSS; "Keep Sweden Swedish") was a far-right, nativist organisation based in Stockholm, Sweden and the precursor of the current Sweden Democrats political party; it also remains a slogan used by various Swedish nationalist parties. The stated objective of the BSS movement, and the aim of the slogan, was to initiate a debate in order to stop immigration by non-Europeans and repatriate non-ethnic Swedes. Inspiration came from the post-World War II fascist organisation Nysvenska Rörelsen created by Per Engdahl. The group was often violent.

Founded as a loosely organised network in 1979 by Leif Zeilon, and formalised as an organisation in 1983, BSS was involved with the populist Progress Party (Swedish: Framstegspartiet) in 1986. This co-operation took place under the name Sweden Party (Swedish: Sverigepartiet). This cooperation evolved into the Sweden Democrats (Swedish: Sverigedemokraterna) (SD) in 1988.

Claiming not to be racists, their often aggressive sticker campaigns arguably indicated otherwise with slogans such as "Låt inte din dotter bli en negerleksak" (Don't let your daughter become a negro toy) and "Negrer hotar sina offer" (Negros threaten their victims).

The slogan "Keep Sweden Swedish" was taken on by the Sweden Democrats and became prevalent during 2003–2004, when it was used for headlines in the party newspaper "SD-Kuriren" and as a slogan on bumper stickers and T-shirts.
