= Sweden Democrats =

Political party in Sweden

Sweden Democrats Sverigedemokraterna
- Abbreviation: SD
- Chairperson: Jimmie Åkesson
- Party secretary: Mattias Bäckström Johansson
- First deputy chair: Henrik Vinge
- Second deputy chair: Julia Kronlid
- Parliamentary group leader: Linda Lindberg
- European Parliament leader: Charlie Weimers
- Founded: 6 February 1988; 38 years ago
- Preceded by: Sweden Party
- Headquarters: Riksdag, 100 12 Stockholm
- Newspaper: SD-Kuriren
- Youth wing: Young Swedes SDU (since 2015); Sweden Democratic Youth (1998–2015)
- Women's wing: SD-Women
- Media wing: Riks
- Membership (2024): ▲33,290
- Ideology: National conservatism; Right-wing populism; Euroscepticism
- Political position: Right-wing to far-right
- European affiliation: Euronat (1997–1999); ADDE (2014–2017); ECR Party (since 2018)
- European Parliament group: EFDD (2014–2018); ECR Group (since 2018)
- Nordic affiliation: NordNat (1997–1999); Nordic Freedom (since 2012)
- Colours: Yellow; Light blue; Bluish purple
- Riksdag: 62 / 349
- European Parliament: 3 / 21
- County Councils: 275 / 1,720
- Municipal Councils: 2,091 / 12,614

Website
- sd.se

The Sweden Democrats (Swedish: Sverigedemokraterna [ˈsvæ̂rjɛdɛmʊˌkrɑːtɛɳa], SD [ˈɛ̂sːdeː]) is a nationalist and right-wing populist political party in Sweden founded in 1988. In 2023, it was the largest member of Sweden's right-wing bloc and the second-largest party in the Riksdag. It provides confidence and supply to the right-wing ruling coalition Kristersson cabinet. Within the European Union, the party is a member of the European Conservatives and Reformists Party.

The party describes itself as social conservative with a nationalist foundation. The party has also been variously characterised by universities, political commentators, and international media as economic nationalist, national-conservative, anti-immigration, anti-Islam, anti-gender, Eurosceptic, and right-wing or far-right. The Sweden Democrats reject the far-right label, saying that it no longer represents its political beliefs. Among the party's founders, original leadership and early members were several people that had previously been active in white nationalist and neo-Nazi political parties and organizations. Under the leadership of Jimmie Åkesson since 2005, the SD underwent a process of reform by expelling hardline members and moderating its beliefs, building on a work that had begun during the late 1990s and early 2000s when the party began to distance itself from extreme-right politics and sought to position its image as a more mainstream party. Today, the SD officially rejects fascism and Nazism on their platform and since 2012 has maintained a zero-tolerance policy against "extremists", "lawbreakers", and "racists". In 2025, the SD issued an official apology for its previous links to neo-Nazism during its early years.

The Sweden Democrats oppose current Swedish immigration and integration policies, instead supporting stronger restrictions on immigration and measures for immigrants to assimilate into Swedish culture. The Sweden Democrats are critical of multiculturalism and support having a common national and cultural identity, which they believe improves social cohesion. The party supports the Swedish welfare state but is against providing welfare to people who are not Swedish citizens and permanent residents of Sweden. The Sweden Democrats support a mixed market economy combining ideas from the centre-left and centre-right. The party supports same-sex marriage, civil unions for gay couples, and gender-affirming surgery but prefers that children be raised in a traditional nuclear family and argues that churches or private institutions should have the final say on performing a wedding over the state. The SD also calls for a ban on forced, polygamous or child marriages and stricter enforcement of laws against honour violence. The Sweden Democrats support keeping Sweden's nuclear power plants in order to mitigate climate change but argues that other countries should reduce their greenhouse gas emissions instead of Sweden, which the party believes is doing enough to reduce their emissions. The Sweden Democrats support generally increasing minimum sentences for crimes, as well as increasing police resources and personnel. The party also supports increasing the number of Swedish Army brigades and supports raising Sweden's defense spending.

Support for the Sweden Democrats has grown steadily since the 1990s and the party crossed the 4% threshold necessary for parliamentary representation for the first time during the 2010 Swedish general election, polling 5.7% and gaining 20 seats in the Riksdag. This increase in popularity has been compared by international media to other similar anti-immigration movements in Europe. The party received increased support in the 2018 Swedish general election, when it polled 17.5% and secured 62 seats in parliament, becoming the third largest party in Sweden. The Sweden Democrats were formerly isolated in the Riksdag until the late 2010s, with other parties maintaining a policy of refusing cooperation with them. In 2019, the leader of the Christian Democrats, Ebba Busch announced that her party was ready to start negotiations with the Sweden Democrats in the Riksdag, as did Moderate Party leader Ulf Kristersson. In the 2022 Swedish general election, the party ran as part of a broad right-wing alliance with those two parties and the Liberals, and came second overall with 20.5% of the vote. Following the election and the Tidö Agreement, it was negotiated that SD agreed to support a Moderate Party-led government together with the Christian Democrats and the Liberals. It is the first time that SD holds direct influence over the government.

== History ==
=== Early years (1988–1995) ===
Early sticker used by the Sweden Democrats with the slogan Bevara Sverige Svenskt ("Keep Sweden Swedish")

The Sweden Democrats party was founded in 1988 as a direct successor to the Sweden Party, which in turn had been formed in 1986 by the merger of the activist group Bevara Sverige Svenskt (BSS; in English: "Keep Sweden Swedish") and a faction of the Swedish Progress Party. The SD continued to use Keep Sweden Swedish as its slogan until the late 1990s. The SD claims 6 February 1988 as the date of its foundation and that the party was formally registered after a meeting in Stockholm designed to bring together various nationalist movements who issued a white paper for a new party, although observers tend to see the party's foundation as part of a complex decade-long series of events, with some even calling into question whether a meeting took place.

Initially, the SD did not have a single centralized leader and was instead fronted by two alternating spokespeople before Anders Klarström became the party's first official chairman and head of the Sweden Democrats' national board in 1989.

According to the anti-racism publication Expo and political historians Duncan McDonnell and Tony Gustafsson, it is generally agreed that the Sweden Democrats have never been a fascist or a neo-Nazi political party, although studies by Expo documented that around 60% of the SD's founders and early members had previously belonged to both Swedish and foreign neo-fascist and white nationalist groups. The party also had a reputation in the late 1980s and early 1990s for attracting skinhead gangs to its public events. The Expo study also claimed that nine of the original 30 people who founded the SD had associations to known Nordic fascist parties such as the New Swedish Movement and the neo-Nazi Nordic Realm Party (Nordiska rikspartiet, abbr. NRP) while another eighteen had been part of the Keep Sweden Swedish organization. The study estimated that around sixty percent of party's national board members between 1989 and 1995 were connected to neo-Nazi movements in various ways both before and during their time in the party. However, the study also noted that a majority of these members were no longer active within the party by the mid-to-late-1990s. The party's first auditor, Gustaf Ekström, was a Waffen-SS veteran and had been a member of the national socialist party Svensk Socialistisk Samling in the 1940s. The SD's first chairman Anders Klarström and party co-founders and first board members Fritz Håkansson and Gösta Bergqvist had all been members of the Nordic Realm Party. Klarström later elaborated he had briefly been part of the NRP as a teenager before distancing himself from it by the time he became SD leader. The first version of the SD's old youth-wing, the Sweden Democratic Youth was accused of having dual leadership with neo-Nazi youth movements until 1995 while the SD's logo from the 1990s until 2006 was a version of the torch used by the British National Front. The SD also encountered controversy for some of its early policy ideas before 1999, which included a proposal to repatriate most immigrants who came to Sweden from 1970, banning adoption of foreign born children and reinstating the death penalty.

The party promoted concerts by the Swedish offshoot of Rock Against Communism and sponsored music of the nationalist Viking rock band Ultima Thule. Various party officials today acknowledge that being fans of Ultima Thule's music factored prominently in their decision to become politically engaged. Early on, the party's newspaper SD-Kuriren promoted connections to its readers such as the National Democratic Party of Germany, the American National Association for the Advancement of White People (founded by David Duke), British politician John Tyndall and publications like the Nazi Nation Europa and Nouvelle École, a newspaper that advocates racial biology and the British neo-Nazi Combat 18 movement.

The SD won municipal representation for the first time during the 1991 Swedish local elections in Dals-Ed Municipality and Höör.

=== Moderation and growth (1995–2010) ===
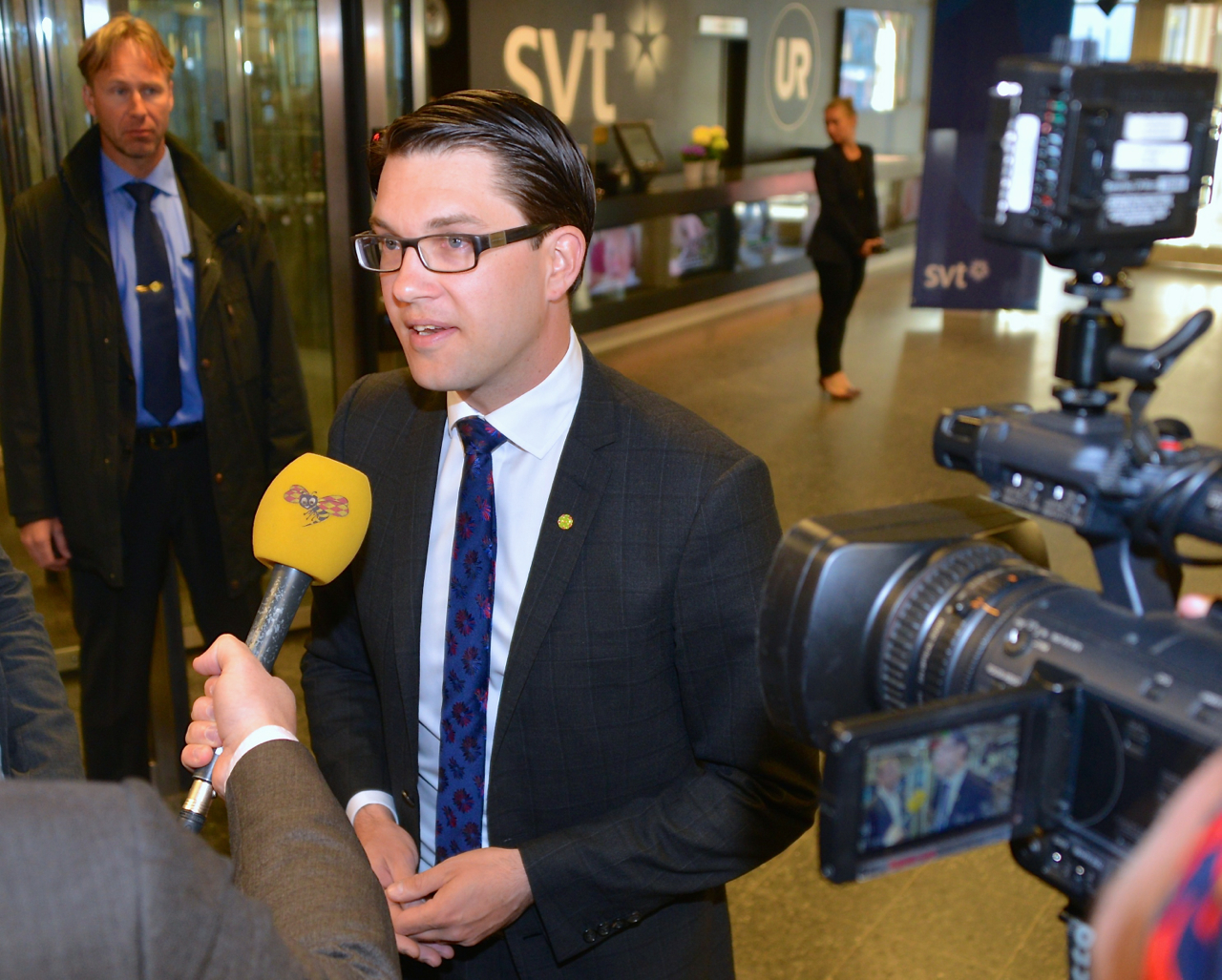
Jimmie Åkesson, interviewed before an SVT party-leader debate in 2014

In 1995, Klarström was replaced as SD chairman by Mikael Jansson, a former member of the Centre Party. Jansson strove to make the party more respectable and took a direct stance against displays of extremism within its ranks. In 1995, the SD closed down its youth-wing and after skinheads started to impose on SD meetings, consuming alcohol at party events, displaying fascist imagery and the wearing of any kind of political uniform were formally banned in 1996. Also in 1996, it was revealed that an SD spokeswoman Tina Hallgren-Bengtsson had been to a party meeting of National Socialist Front posing in a Nazi uniform. Opposition to the party have mistakenly mixed these two events together and falsely claim that she was wearing the uniform at a rally of the Sweden Democrats and that it was because of this that the uniform ban came about. During the early 1990s, the SD sought to become a more conventional political party and became more influenced by the French National Rally, as well as the Freedom Party of Austria, the Danish People's Party, German The Republicans and Italian National Alliance. SD received economic support for the 1998 election from the then called French National Front, and became active in Jean-Marie Le Pen's Euronat from the same time.

By the end of the end of the decade, the party began to take further steps to moderate itself by distancing itself from all forms of fascist ideology, softening its policies on immigration and capital punishment, as well as removing party figures deemed to be too controversial. In 1999, the SD left Euronat although the youth wing remained affiliated until 2002. In 2001, the most extreme faction of the SD's national board was expelled, leading to the formation of the more radical National Democrats which in turn resulted in many of the SD's remaining hardline members departing for the new party. During the 2002 Swedish general election the SD became the largest party outside of the Riksdag and won 50 seats in municipalities during the local elections held at the same time.

During the early 2000s, a reformist faction known as the so-called "Scania gang", also known as the "Gang of Four" or "Fantastic Four", which consisted of the youth wing chairman Jimmie Åkesson, as well as Björn Söder, Mattias Karlsson and Richard Jomshof continued and expanded the moderation policy, which included ousting openly extremist members, banning neo-Nazi activists from attending party events or obtaining membership, and further revising the SD's policy platform. Before the 2002 election, former Member of Parliament (MP) for the Moderate Party, Sten Andersson defected to SD, citing that the party had gotten rid of its extreme-right elements. In 2003, the party declared the Universal Declaration of Human Rights to be a cornerstone of its policies. In 2005, Åkesson defeated Jansson in a leadership contest. Shortly after, the party changed its logo from the flaming torch to one featuring an Anemone hepatica, reminiscent of the party's very first, but short-lived, logo (a stylised Myosotis scorpioides).

=== Entrance into parliament and ideological realignment (2010–2014) ===
In the 2010 Swedish general election, SD won representation in the Swedish Riksdag for the first time, with 5.7% of the vote and 20 MPs.

In 2010, the SD leadership introduced a charter against racism on the party platform and later expanded this into a zero-tolerance policy regarding political extremism and law breaking. After some of the SD's elected members caused controversies during the party's first term in the Riksdag, the SD also stated it would introduce a vetting procedure for its future parliamentary candidates and issued updated guidelines on conduct and communication for party members. In 2011, the party also changed its self-description from "nationalist" to "social conservative". In 2012 a report by a Swedish government agency declared that the SD had made significant progress in reforming itself but still had work to do in coming to terms with its past.

Sweden Democrat MP William Petzäll was persuaded to leave the party on 26 September 2011 while still retaining his parliamentary seat. This was done because of Petzäll's substance abuse and the problems this might cause for SD's public image. Petzäll later died of an overdose and his seat was turned over to Stellan Bojerud in September 2012.

In November 2012, videos from August 2010 were released, in segments, over the course of three days by Swedish newspaper Expressen (a year earlier, Expressen had released the same videos without making much noise). This came to be known as the Iron pipe scandal, although the same videos had already been released on YouTube by Erik Almqvist in 2010. The videos, recorded by MP Kent Ekeroth, featured him along with fellow Sweden Democrats MP Erik Almqvist and Christian Westling. The videos show Almqvist arguing with comedian Soran Ismail: Almqvist is referring to Sweden as "my country, not your country", as an insult to Ismail. They are also shown arguing with a drunken man. A woman can also be seen approaching Kent Ekeroth while filming; he calls her a whore and pushes her out of the way. A few minutes later they are seen picking up iron bars. Coming only a month after party leader Åkesson had instated a zero-tolerance policy towards racism in the party, the release of the video caused Almqvist to leave his position as the party's economic policy spokesperson and his place in the executive committee on 14 November. He excused himself as having been under a lot of pressure and threats of violence at the time. As more segments of the video were released, revealing the other two men's involvement, the party announced on 15 November that Ekeroth would take a break from his position as the party's justice policy spokesman. Almqvist and Ekeroth both took time off from their parliament seats. Sweden Democratic Youth president Gustav Kasselstrand and vice president William Hahne criticised the decision to remove Almqvist and Ekeroth in an op-ed in Dagens Nyheter, arguing that the party should not give in to media pressure.

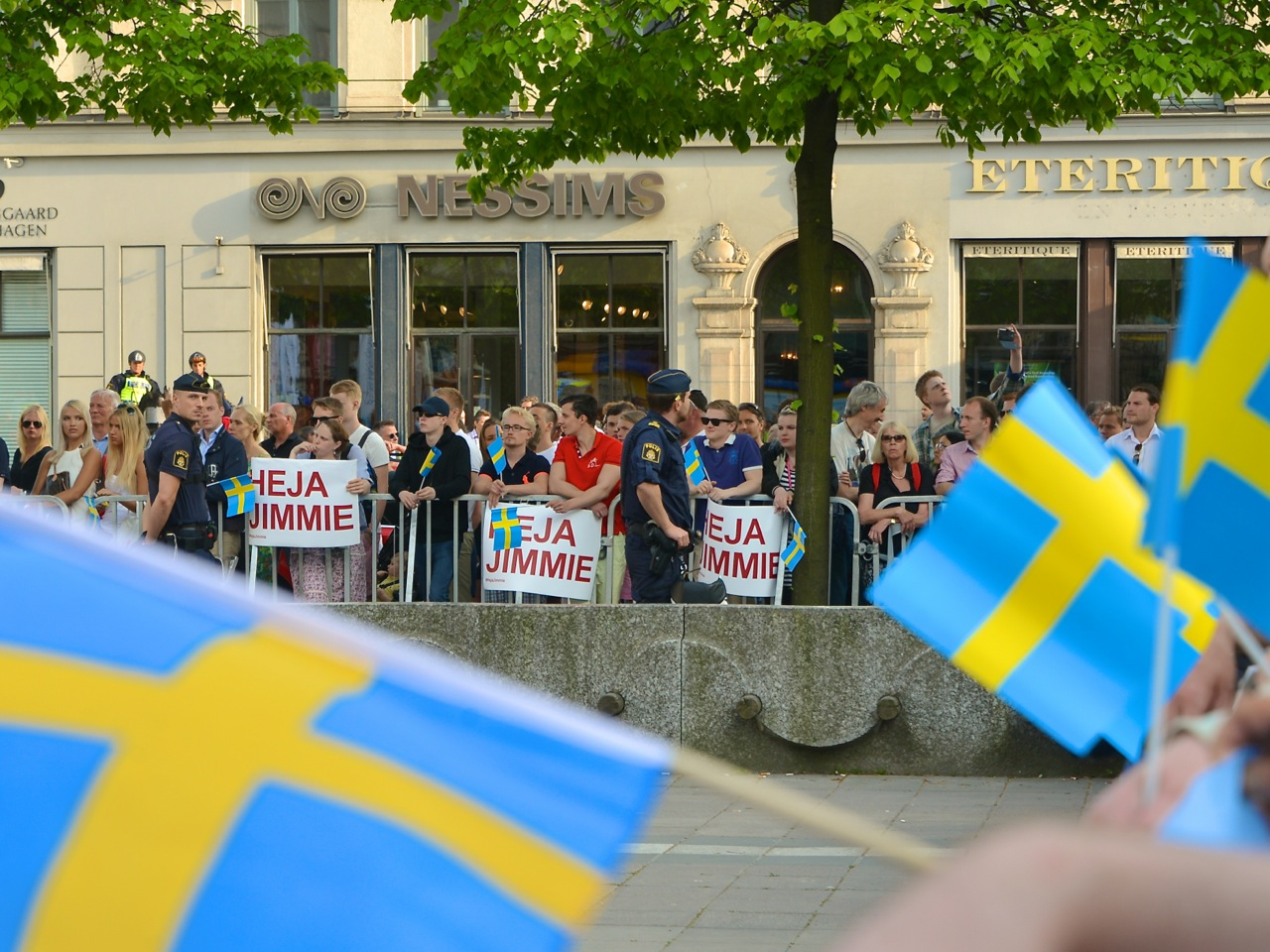
Sweden Democrat supporters in Stockholm during the 2014 European elections

Only two weeks after Almqvist and Ekeroth were forced to step down, fellow MP Lars Isovaara reported being robbed of his backpack and pushed out of his wheelchair by "two unknown men of an immigrant background". When trying to get into the Riksdag, Isovaara was himself reported by the police for racial abuse against safety guards. The Sweden Democrats initially defended Isovaara, but backed down when Expressen revealed that Isovaara had actually forgotten his backpack at a restaurant, and that the two men had helped him when he fell out of his wheelchair. He left his seat in the Riksdag on 29 November, and was replaced by Markus Wiechel.

=== Rise in national support (2014–2018) ===
In the European election of 2014, SD received 9.67% of votes, winning two seats in the European Parliament and becoming the fifth largest party in the country. After speculation that the SD would join an EU parliamentary group with Marine Le Pen the SD stated that its preferred partners would be the Danish People's Party and the UK Independence Party (UKIP) or to sit as independents. The party later joined the Alliance for Direct Democracy in Europe and the Europe of Freedom and Direct Democracy group.

In the 2014 election, the Sweden Democrats received 12.9% of the votes, doubling their support and becoming the third-largest party. The party remained big in Scania and Blekinge; for example in Malmö the party received 14% of the votes, in Landskrona it received 19% of the votes and in Sjöbo a total of 30% rendering the party the largest in that municipality. Other parties, however, remained firm in their decision to isolate them from exerting influence. Out of 29 constituencies electing parliamentarians, the party was the second largest in "Scania North & East" while being the third largest party in 25. Although relying heavily on rural areas and the deep south, the party also made strong inroads and results above 15% in some medium-sized central Sweden cities such as Norrköping, Eskilstuna and Gävle, indicating a widening of its voter base in all areas.

Some time after that, Åkesson announced he would go on sick leave due to burnout. Mattias Karlsson was appointed to temporarily take over Åkesson's duties as party leader.

On 23 March 2015, it was announced that Åkesson would return from his leave of absence to resume his duties as party leader following an interview to be broadcast on the Friday, 27 March instalment of the Skavlan program on SVT, and a subsequent press conference with the Swedish media.

Amid media coverage regarding the high immigration figures and the European migrant crisis, the Sweden Democrats soared in all opinion polls during the summer of 2015, even topping web-based polls from YouGov and Sentio in late summer, with a little over a quarter of the vote. The party also saw rising support in phone-based polls, although the swing was lower.

=== Entering mainstream politics (2018–2022) ===
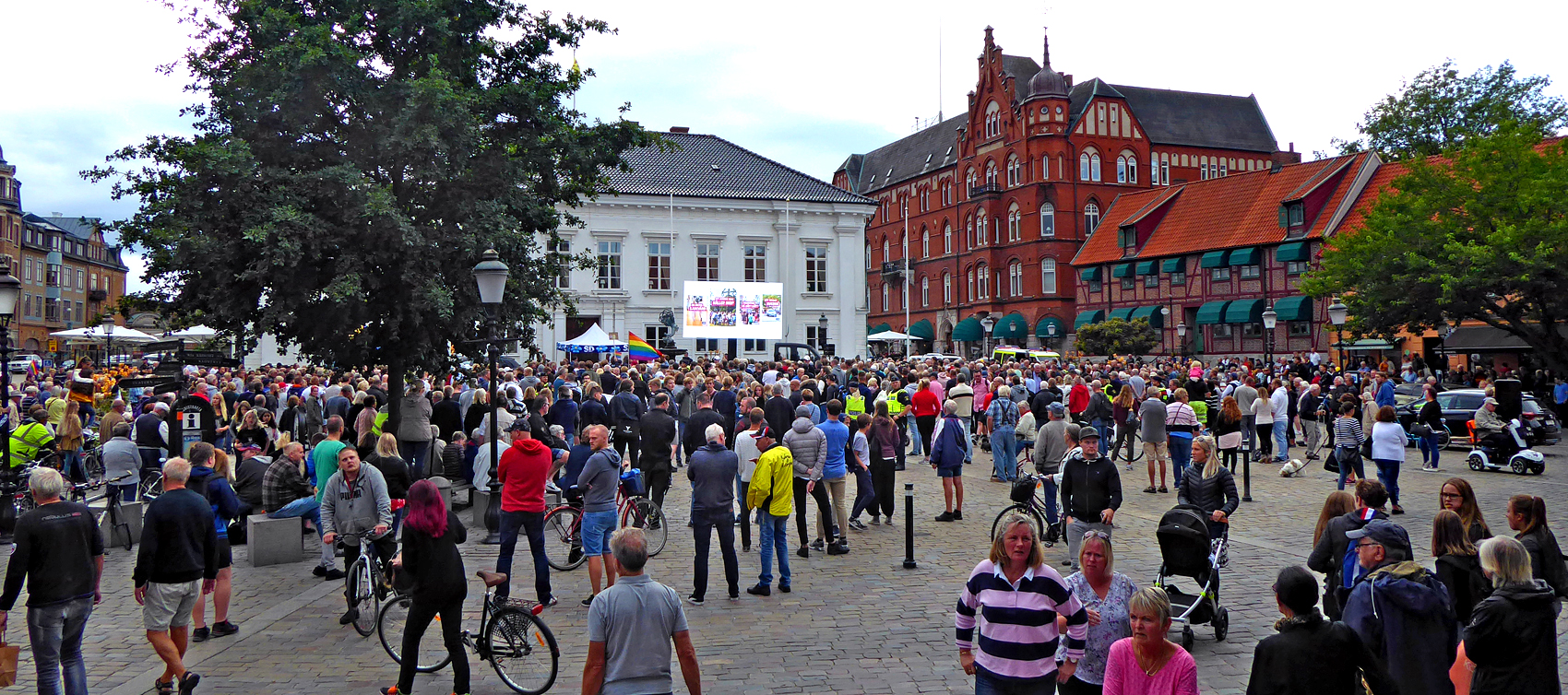
SD rally in Ystad in August 2018 ahead of the 2018 Swedish general election

In early 2018, the far-right Alternative for Sweden (AfS) was founded by members of the Sweden Democratic Youth, who were collectively expelled from the Sweden Democrats in 2015. Three Sweden Democrat members of the Riksdag – Olle Felten, Jeff Ahl and former leader Mikael Jansson – subsequently defected to the party. Senior Sweden Democrats spokespeople such as Henrik Vinge were critical of the AfS and described it as containing people who were too extreme for SD.

On 2 July 2018, the two Sweden Democrats MEPs left the EFDD group and moved to the European Conservatives and Reformists Group.

In the 2018 Swedish general election, the SD increased its support to 17.5% of the vote, though it did not grow as much as most polls had predicted. According to Emily Schultheis of Foreign Policy, the SD won an ideological victory, as it "effectively set the terms for debate" and forced its rivals to adopt immigration policies similar to its own, and other reporters made similar observations. The SD performed particularly well in Skåne County, having the highest number of voters in 21 out of the county's 33 municipalities. An SVT analysis of the results found that at least 22 seats in 17 city councils would be empty as the Sweden Democrats won more seats than the number of candidates it had. The party also received its first mayor, in Hörby Municipality.

Following the election, Christian Democratic leader Ebba Busch announced that her party was willing to enter negotiations with the Sweden Democrats in the Riksdag. In December 2019, Moderate Party leader Ulf Kristersson held an official meeting with the Sweden Democrat leadership for the first time, despite having previously ruled out negotiating with the party. This led to speculation that the SD could be included in a new centre-right grouping to replace the Alliance which had collapsed after the Centre Party and the Liberal Party left to support the Social Democratic led government.

In October 2018, the Sweden Democrats went into a governing coalitions with the Moderate Party and the Christian Democrats for the first time in Staffanstorp Municipality, Sölvesborg Municipality, Herrljunga Municipality and Bromölla Municipality. In Bromölla, coalition felt apart in 2020, while new coalitions with the SD emerged in Svalöv Municipality (2019), Bjuv Municipality (2020) and Surahammar Municipality (2021).

In 2020, Mattias Karlsson, the former group leader of the Sweden Democrats in the Riksdag founded Oikos, a conservative think-tank which has been alleged to be an "extension of the Sweden Democrats' political project", supposedly also receiving funding from the party.

In 2021, the SD was invited to participate in alternative budget agreement talks with the Christian Democrats and the Moderates for the first time. That same year the SD also issued a vote of no confidence against the Löfven II cabinet citing the government's handling on immigration, the economy and housing which was carried by the other opposition parties and led to Löfven's impeachment. The SD had previously issued a vote of no confidence in the government in 2015, albeit without success.

=== 2022 general election (since 2022) ===
Ahead of the 2022 Swedish general election, the SD attempted to form a conservative grouping with the Moderates, Christian Democrats and the Liberals and requested ministerial posts in government should the right-wing bloc form a parliamentary majority. During the election, the SD campaigned to reduce asylum migration close to zero, stricter policies on work permits, lower energy bills and a tougher stance on gang violence with longer prison sentences. Preliminary results indicated that the Sweden Democrats had seen their strongest result to date and had overtaken the Moderates to become the second largest party with 20.6% of the vote. The result was confirmed after the election.

In October 2022, the SD was allocated chairmanship of four parliamentary committees for the first time in the Riksdag with party secretary Richard Jomshof appointed to head the Justice Committee, Aron Emilsson the Committee on Foreign Affairs, Tobias Andersson the Committee on Industry and Trade, and Magnus Persson the Committee on the Labour Market. SD parliamentarians were appointed as international delegation leaders for the first time, with Markus Wiechel becoming chairman of the Swedish delegation to the Parliamentary Assembly of the Council of Europe, Björn Söder for the Organization for Security and Co-operation in Europe and Adam Marttinen the chairman of the joint-parliamentary group for Europol.

The party also formed a deal with Moderate leader Ulf Kristersson to provide for the first time in their history parliamentary support to a Moderate Party-led government as part of the Tidö Agreement. In May 2023, SD representative Elsa Widding left the party after she was criticised for attending a conference organised by Searchlight. She remained as an independent politician voting with the SD group within the Tidö coalition. In 2025 the SD Riksdag group dropped to 70 MPs after Katja Nyberg and Sara-Lena Bjälkö both resigned from the party; Nyberg chose to leave the SD after receiving a drunk driving charge while Bjälkö left to join the Christian Democrats. In 2026 the SD group rose back up to 72 MPs after Moderate Party parliamentarians Arin Karapet and Marléne Lund Kopparklint defected to the Sweden Democrats.

Ahead of the 2026 Swedish general election, the Liberals announced they had eliminated all red lines on cooperating with the Sweden Democrats in a future centre-right coalition becoming the last party in the Tidö Agreement to completely end the cordon sanitaire against the SD. Although both part of the Tidö coalition, the Liberals had previously opposed appointing SD politicians into cabinet roles before changing its stance in March 2026. The decision was supported by the Moderates and the Christian Democrats but it also prompted several Liberal politicians to quit the party in protest. That same month, Prime Minister Ulf Kristersson stated that he would include the SD in the cabinet and give the party ministerial duties should the right-wing bloc gain another majority.

In the 2026 parliamentary election, the Sweden Democrats were projected to lose around 11 seats, marking the first parliamentary election in which the party's share of the vote declined. Åkesson subsequently blamed both the Social Democrats and parties on the left for “mobilizing the Islamist voters who previously had other parties to vote for" and the emergence of smaller right-wing parties which failed to reach the threshold to enter the Riksdag for costing the SD support while political scientist Nicholas Aylott and journalist Tim Ross argued that the party had been a "victim of its own success" in cutting immigration and crime thereby reducing the importance of issues the SD had been associated with along with Social Democrat leader Magdalena Andersson pledging a stricter stance on immigration.

== Ideology and political positions ==
The Sweden Democrats' current party programme is based on "democratic nationalism" and social conservatism. The SD platform expresses that the party's core philosophy is inspired by Swedish national conservatism and parts of the social democratic folkhemmet ('the people's home') idea. SD rejects any positioning of the party within the classic left-right scale, instead referring to itself as a "value-oriented" or "value-conservative" party. The party has stated that "basic social justice with traditional conservative ideas", nationalism and desires for democratic and good governance form its main principles. Nevertheless, the party is often described by international commentators as being right-wing to far-right.

In policy, SD articulates its main focus to be the areas of immigration, law and order and the elderly. The party also attaches particular importance to its economic and family policies. The SD criticizes multiculturalism in Sweden and emphasizes preserving national heritage. It is also opposed to what it sees as a constant shift of power from Stockholm to the European Union and campaigns to protect Swedish sovereignty and financial autonomy against the EU.

=== Political analysis ===
The SD's ideology and political identity has evolved significantly in the decades since its founding and entrance into the Riksdag. Labels for the party have consequently been a source of debate by outside observers. Nordic Studies scholar Benjamin R. Teitelbaum called the SD radical nationalist in 2013 and by 2018 said the party has since moved to the "softer side" of European populist parties. The party has been described by sociologist Jens Rydgren and political scientist Cas Mudde variously as xenophobic, far-right, racist or right-wing populist. French newspaper Le Monde profiled the SD as far-right and "a nationalist party with fascist roots". Critics of the SD have argued that it contains a more dangerous or problematic ideology behind a moderate facade, whereas others such as Teitelbaum have argued that research into the SD has been politically biased and that the SD has become more difficult to define due to its beliefs changing over the years. In 2013, a Sveriges Radio journalist called the SD "xenophobic", which resulted in a complaint lodged to the broadcasting regulator by the party. The Swedish Broadcasting Commission determined that this description was acceptable to use. According to Sveriges Radio in 2017, a European research agency classed the party as "extreme" using the Swedish GAL-TAN political scale, arguing that the SD is more traditionalist, socially authoritarian and nationalist and less progressive compared to other Swedish parliamentary parties and described the SD as similar to the French National Rally in some of its policies. In 2019, the polling company Novus said that their opinion polls show that SD is no-longer a "one-issue" party in regards to immigration, having won trust in other political questions too. In 2022, University of Gothenburg political scientist Johan Martinsson described the SD as "anti-immigration, anti-multicultural, nationalist" while stopping short of labelling the SD as a far-right party.

However, the characterization of the SD as radical or extreme far-right has come under dispute in recent years by scholars and political observers. Commentator Kateřina Lišaníková observed that the SD had hardline origins through its founders and initial support network, and notes that the SD's leadership openly acknowledges the party's history, but argues the present version of the SD does not match the description of a radical far-right party but is mistakenly labelled as such by media or opponents who focus on the party's early rather than current beliefs. She stated that the SD is now a national conservative party with populist elements but does not contradict democratic or Swedish constitutional principles. Similar observations were made in 2021 by Swedish political scientist Sören Holmberg that "extreme right" was not a good description for the SD when placed within the traditional left-right scale, since the party contains centre-left and centrist policies on some issues compared to the other centre-right parties in Sweden. Holmberg furthermore argued that while SD can be considered a right-wing populist party, the label "populist" has become unstable due to some of the other parties in the Riksdag adopting populist ideas of their own. He concluded national-conservative was a better term for the SD. Swedish sociologist Göran Adamson has also argued some political opposition conflate the SD's national conservative image as being right-wing extremist, and argued that the SD today is no longer comparable to European extreme-right or neo-fascist parties since the SD has a more liberal direction in several areas, and there is no evidence to suggest that the current incarnation of the party's policies are fascist or anti-democratic.

Describing the party's political trajectory, Johan Martinsson wrote that "culturally nationalist" was the most appropriate label for the Sweden Democrats since the party has continued to change its ideological programs and manifestos since its founding and no longer refer to ethnic nationalism in party literature. Martinsson acknowledged that the SD had links to Nazi movements during its first years before transforming itself in a conventional political party during the 1990s and since the 2010s the term "radical right" is no longer accurate for the SD. Martinsson summarized that while the SD adopts populist and anti-immigration rhetoric, other parties had also adopted more restrictive stances on migration and the SD's support for welfare state policies contrasts it from other right-leaning parties while the term "right" can be used as a pejorative label as opposed to an accurate description. Sweden-based British journalist Richard Orange noted in 2018 that the SD stands out due to its neo-Nazi roots but in the present now endorses more inclusive "cultural nationalism" over ethnic homogeny while calling for stricter immigration policies. In 2022, British political scientist Matthew Goodwin described the SD as having transformed itself from an extreme past to becoming part of a broader European family of national-populist parties which combine social and cultural conservative nationalism and populism but are opposed to fascist, anti-democratic and revolutionary ideas.

Within the party, the SD's leadership have rejected the extreme and "far-right" labels and argue they no longer represent the party. SD also states that its ideas are not racist and maintains that expressions of neo-fascism or Nazism among its membership are historical and no longer tolerated. Oscar Sjöstedt, the SD's financial spokesperson, places the party around the centre on the left–right political spectrum, while leader Jimmie Åkesson has stated that they are parallel with the Moderate Party. A 2016 survey of SD MPs in the Riksdag analyzed the party's voting record as closer to the centre-right Alliance on 44 percent of policy issues and closer to the Red-Greens on 25 percent of issues. SD group leader Mattias Karlsson stated in 2017 that the party is in the middle when it comes to economic redistribution policy and views on the welfare state, but centre-right on certain values such as defense and immigration policy. Swedish political scientist Henrik Ekengren Oscarsson published a similar conclusion about the party's voter base in 2016 which argued SD supporters are less likely to identify with traditional political labels but align to being centrist or to the left on economic matters and conservative on other issues. In addition, the SD has in recent years increasingly distanced itself from other European ultra-nationalist or far-right parties and stated it does not want anything to do with international and Swedish hard-right entities. In spite of this, a 2022 report by Swedish researchers Acta Publica claimed to have found 289 Swedish politicians who expressed racist or neo-Nazi views, with 214 of them being members of the SD. The SD itself has argued that some of these controversies with members have been as a result of the party's rapid growth since the late 2000s rather than the party itself being extremist.

== Policies and beliefs ==
=== Domestic policy ===
The party is a supporter of the Swedish monarchy playing a constitutional and cultural role in Swedish life, but also supports an amendment to the constitution that obligates the Riksdag to elect a new monarch in the event of there being no heir to the throne. In 2025 the party supported changing the citizenship requirements to the conditions of being able to speak Swedish, having education about Swedish culture and having an honest way of life, as well as declaring loyalty to Sweden.

The Sweden Democrats have been critical of the special rights given to the indigenous Sámi people of northern Sweden. In 2008, the party accepted a motion against the rights to reindeer husbandry. They have argued that those "who do not involve themselves with reindeer husbandry are treated as second class citizens" and that the privileges the herders have are "undemocratic". The party has previously wanted to abolish the Sámi Parliament, which it claimed special privileges for an "ethnic minority while the society claims equal rights for others". However, the SD has since disputed that it endorses abolishing the Sámi Parliament with SD spokesman Mattias Karlsson saying in a 2013 interview that "the Sami are an indigenous people with an indisputable right to preserve their identity and culture."

=== National identity and culture ===
The Sweden Democrats value a strong common national and cultural identity, believing these to be the most basic cornerstones of a functioning democracy and successful society. Minimizing linguistic, cultural and religious differences in society and emphasizing a defined sense of Swedish cultural values and social norms has a positive effect on societal cohesion, maintaining a welfare state and encouraging solidarity among the population, according to the party. On its platform, SD states the Swedish nation is defined "in terms of loyalty, a common language and common culture". A requirement for becoming a member of the Swedish nation is to either "be born in it or by actively choosing to be a part of it". For these reasons among others, SD firmly rejects multiculturalism and argues that Sweden should preserve its cultural heritage by assimilating newcomers and maintaining Swedish as the nation's official language.

Until the 2000s, the SD attached ethnopluralist arguments to its defense of a Swedish homeland and culture. The 2005 party handbook called for a "high degree of ethnic and cultural similarity among the population" while the old party platform described the need to preserve the "inherited essence" of ethnic Swedes. However, the SD's official platform since 2018 no longer refers to a Swedish nation and people in an ethnically defined context, but adopts a more moderate cultural conservative policy promoting a shared national identity in which foreign-born people can become Swedish through stricter assimilation policies in exchange for citizenship and by the state asserting a more defined concept of Swedish culture and social values. The SD argues that not having a defined sense of what it means to be Swedish makes it harder for those of non-Western cultures to understand and become part of Swedish society. SD representatives have expressed that lacking a defined Swedish cultural identity and society will leave Sweden vulnerable to takeovers by more defined but aggressive cultures and social attitudes, with members of the party citing Islamic culture as an example. The SD has cited a strong work ethic, respect for nature, appreciation for Lutheran Christian traditions, speaking Swedish and equality between the sexes as important parts of Swedish cultural values that the country should strive to maintain. Nevertheless, the idea of a binding "inherited essence" is still a defining feature of SD supporters' worldview. A 2025 study reveals that supporters of the Sweden Democrats are more likely than those of other parties to believe that social differences (e.g., talents, intelligence, behaviours) between individuals, genders, and groups reflect genetic predispositions.

In a 2014 interview for Dagens Nyheter, Second Deputy Speaker of the Riksdag and then-party secretary Björn Söder elaborated on the SD party programme with respect to its views on national identity and obtaining Swedish citizenship by saying that although an immigrant of any ethnic background in theory can become a Swedish citizen, they would have to adapt and be assimilated in order to be considered Swedish in the cultural sense, since the SD does not view a simple acquisition of Swedish citizenship with no assimilation requirements as the same as becoming part of Swedish society. In the interview, Söder stated that the officially recognised Swedish minority peoples such as Sámi, Tornedalians and Jews in many cases had dual cultural identities and that they probably would be proud of both heritages, and claimed that while these minorities are part of Sweden today, they had to give up part of their own culture in the past to integrate and become culturally Swedish. It was widely interpreted that Söder had stated in the interview that Jews cannot be Swedish unless they abandon their Jewish identity. Söder's comments were accused of being antisemitic and caused Swedish parliamentary groups and party leaders to call for his resignation. The Simon Wiesenthal Center listed the statement as number six on their list of the top ten most anti-semitic events of 2014. Söder responded in an article for The Jerusalem Post, denying the charges of anti-semitism and claiming Dagens Nyheter had taken his statements out of context. In response, the SD also stated that it rejects antisemitism in Sweden and supports Israel in foreign policy, and that its proposed assimilation model is based on recognizing the difference between the concept of nationhood and acquired citizenship as opposed to implying minorities have split loyalties.

The Sweden Democrats advocates a cultural policy that would strip government funding for multicultural initiatives and strengthen support for traditional Swedish culture. This agenda has often manifested itself as opposition to state funding of immigrant cultural organisations and festivals, and more support for traditional Swedish craft, folk music, and folk dance groups. The party also tends to oppose state support for cultural initiatives deemed provocative or elitist. A 2014 letter signed by 52 Swedish anthropologists, criticised the Sweden Democrats' use of the terms "culture" (kultur [kɵlˈtʉːr]) and "anthropology" (antropologi [antrɔpʊlʊˈɡiː]), claiming their views on culture were "essentialist and obsolete", clarifying that culture is "dynamic" and "in constant change". The Sweden Democrats themselves maintain that traditional elements of Sweden's culture should not be rendered obsolete in favour of multiculturalism and argue Swedish cultural values contributed to the nation's economic and social successes through the "people's home" (Folkhemmet) concept. According to scholar Bo Nilsson, the party links the adoption of multicultural policies with a subsequent decline in the Folkhemmet model and Sweden's success.

The party has expressed opposition to certain forms of modern architecture and in 2022 called for new housing to reflect traditional architectural styles, with the SD supporting more investment and streamlined planning permission rules into building new homes designed to match the specifications of what the party calls the "Sverigehuset" (the Sweden House), a classic wooden house design in Sweden. In 2025, the SD proposed to the National Board of Housing, Building and Planning to build more affordable housing in traditional designs.

The Sweden Democrats also criticise modern art, and have accused local councils of wasting public money on what it calls "provocative" art. The SD want citizens to be able to vote in local referendums on public art displayed near schools, public transport stations and town centres. "The important thing is that what is expressed in the public environment is anchored to the citizens and especially the local residents who are most often in the environment so that they feel an identification", says the party's cultural spokesperson Aron Emilsson. Sweden Democrats mayor in Sölvesborg Louise Erixon claimed "There's a big division between what the general public thinks is beautiful and interesting and what a tiny cultural elite thinks is exciting".

The Sweden Democrats also support a ban on the burqa and niqāb in public places and are against proposals to publicly broadcast the Islamic call to prayer from minarets. The SD wants tougher enforcement of existing laws against female genital mutilation, honor violence and social segregation. The party also wants Swedish to remain Sweden's main official language in state funded schools, government agencies and public funded media, and for more teaching of Swedish cultural history in schools. It also supports prohibiting the hijab in primary schools, arguing that while it is not opposed to hijabs in general, the choice to wear it should be made on an individual basis when a child reaches adulthood. The SD is strongly opposed to sharia law being incorporated into the Swedish legal system.

Leading party representatives have also spoken out in various contexts against mosques and Islamic centres in Sweden. In 2023, SD leader Jimmie Åkesson argued that Swedish mosques which preach "anti-democratic, anti-Swedish, homophobic, anti-Semitic propaganda" should be closed and demolished and expressed opposition to the construction of new Islamic buildings. SD has also argued that other Swedish parties, particularly those on the left such as the Social Democrats are tolerant of Islamist activities in Sweden to secure votes at the expense of Swedish culture and security. In January 2024, Richard Jomshof, chairman of the Justice Committee in the Riksdag, ignited controversy in Sweden by proposing the prohibition of the Islamic star and crescent. He drew parallels to the ban on the Swastika, claiming that both symbols represent something dangerous.

==== Immigration ====
The Sweden Democrats believe that Sweden's recent immigration and integration policies have been a national failure. In a statement filed before the Riksdag Committee on Migration in August 2020, SD claims that Sweden's "irresponsible" immigration and asylum policies have subjected Sweden to an on-going "long-term, albeit low-intensity crisis". The SD official policy brief states that the party "welcomes those who contribute to our [Sweden's] society, who follow our laws and respect our customs. On the other hand, anyone who comes here and exploits our systems, commits crimes or exposes our citizens to danger is not welcome".

Historically, SD sought to repatriate most immigrants and ban immigration entirely; however, these policies were moderated in the 1990s before being abolished altogether. Presently, SD positions itself against mass immigration and wishes to strongly restrict immigration by instead giving generous support to those who do not want to assimilate into Swedish society to emigrate back to their country of origin. The SD also wants to change laws to allow for wider deportations of foreign residents who engage in illegal activity or are unemployed and abusing state welfare. The Sweden Democrats also call for an expansion of circumstances in which citizenship can be revoked from naturalized citizens, with Jimmie Åkesson mentioning examples of those who commit crimes, engage in delinquency, support terrorism or remain socially unintegrated into society. The Sweden Democrats also support raising the remigration allowance given to migrants and asylum seekers who seek to voluntarily leave the country. The SD argues that its immigration policies are not based on xenophobia and that the party is not opposed to immigration per se, but believe immigration must stay at a level where it does not "threaten national identity, the country's welfare or security". SD has also campaigned to restrict immigration from what it calls "culturally distant" countries and argues that temporary work visas should be limited only to skills that are impossible to find in Sweden. SD are against free movement of labour within the European Union, calling on Sweden to revise its membership of the Schengen agreement, but support free movement between Nordic nations. The SD believes that Sweden will be better able to help refugees and economic migrants in their home areas once more state funds are freed from being directed towards funding immigration in Sweden. SD also favours cultural assimilation over integration of immigrants from non-Western backgrounds, arguing that integration is a meet in the middle approach and that Swedes should not have to bear the burden over what the party claims have been reckless immigration policies. Torbjörn Kastell (former party secretary from 2003 to 2004) said in 2002 that the party wanted "a multicultural world, not a multicultural society".

When handling asylum seekers and refugee cases, the SD supports protecting national sovereignty in regards to Sweden's decisions on migration and border control. The party calls for Sweden to adopt "the principle of first safe country" into its asylum laws, meaning that asylum seekers should only be able to seek refugee status in the first safe country that they arrive in and will be refused refugee status in Sweden if they have already crossed multiple safe countries or their case is already registered in a foreign state. Until such legislation is realized by the Riksdag, SD supports implementing stronger deterrents against asylum migration to Sweden through other countries and setting stricter limits on the right to welfare that asylum seekers are entitled to by the Swedish state and making cultural assimilation of those already in Sweden mandatory. The party opposes offering permanent residency to refugees, believing that temporary residency should be the standard for those who claim asylum in Sweden before a path to full residency or citizenship is considered. SD supports Sweden eventually accepting refugees exclusively through the UNHCR resettlement programme in accordance with a quota based on each municipality's capacity once Sweden's asylum laws are reformed and tightened. SD has also referred to the recommendations from the United Nations High Commissioner for Refugees (UNHCR), which state that the return of refugees should be the solution to refugee problems. On asylum cases from the Middle East and Africa, the party supports giving priority to persecuted Christian, former Muslim and other religious or sexual minorities fleeing war or death for apostasy, believing that such individuals are less likely to be offered refuge elsewhere. In 2017, members of the Sweden Democrats' leadership defended comments made by then US President Donald Trump in response to Trump's assertion that Sweden's immigration and asylum policies had led to a rise of terrorism and crime in Sweden. However, following the 2022 Russian invasion of Ukraine the SD supported accepting and accommodating Ukrainian refugees in Sweden. Ahead of the 2022 Swedish general election, the party campaigned to tighten the rules in the Swedish Aliens Act (Utlänningslagen) to the strictest possible level within European law and encourage voluntary remigration of asylum seekers and immigrants who are economically inactive or remain culturally unassimilated.

The SD also wants European governments to construct a security wall along the European border with Turkey in response to illegal immigration, terrorism and incursions by the Grey Wolves into Greece. It also calls on the European Union to commonly adopt a migration system based on the Australian model to prevent human trafficking across the Mediterranean, which the party states enables illegal immigrants and terrorists to reach Sweden. SD calls for compulsory measures for immigrants to be employed, live and work in Sweden for at least ten years, learn the Swedish language, go through a mandatory cultural assimilation program, and be subject to a language and social skills test before becoming eligible for Swedish citizenship. The party also supports increased spending on border patrol forces, zero tolerance laws on illegal immigration and foreign-born criminals, repatriations of Schengen Area migrants who move to Sweden to make a living from street begging, changes in the law to enable the government to strip foreign-born Swedish nationals of their citizenship if found guilty of a crime, penalties against employers who use foreign and undocumented labor to circumvent Swedish working conditions and stricter laws against family migration.

In recent years, the SD has tried to approach the immigration policies of the Danish People's Party, which from 2001 to 2011 provided parliamentary support for the former Danish centre-right governments in return for a tightening of Danish immigration policies and stricter naturalisation laws. Following the 2022 Swedish general election, the Sweden Democrats achieved this objective under the Tidö Agreement with the centre-right Moderate, Christian Democrat and Liberal Party coalition government. In exchange for SD parliamentary support, the Swedish government conceded to some of the SD's immigration policy demands on requirements for obtaining Swedish citizenship and expanding the deportation circumstances for foreign-born residents and asylum seekers.

Following scenes of people in Swedish cities celebrating the October 7 attacks, the SD leadership stated that those who praised the attack should be expelled from the country and that the Tidö Agreement clause on deporting non-citizens on grounds of poor character and not just criminal convictions should be used against those who support Hamas. SD also states that Swedes of foreign backgrounds who leave the country to join legally designated terrorist groups should be stripped of their citizenship or residency and denied re-entry into the country.

During the 2026 Swedish general election campaign, Åkesson warned in the final debate in SVT that practicing Muslims, who visit mosques, can decide the election result. He argued that both the Swedish Social Democratic Party and the Left Party have strategies of mobilizing in mosques and Muslim congregations to gain voters. He was subsequently heavily criticized by the opposition and by the editorial of Dagens Nyheter for not accepting that every individual vote is of equal value.

=== Society and crime ===
==== Family policy ====
The Sweden Democrats consider children raised in a nuclear family as the preferred option for the child's development. Those not raised by their biological parents should have the right to associate with or at least find out who they were. SD has been critical of adoption and artificial insemination for same-sex couples and polyamorous people.

The party also calls for a ban on child, polygamous and forced marriages, as well as harsher penalties for honor violence. It also supports a zero-tolerance stance against female genital mutilation within Sweden and abroad, and for perpetrators to be prosecuted or if necessary deported. SD also wants certain restrictions on male circumcision, calling for a ban on minors unless its for medical reasons. The party says that while it does support male circumcision for religious reasons, it should be performed at the age of consent and the state should not fund it through the healthcare system.

SD supports abortion being legal in Sweden and free access to abortions up to the legal limit in Sweden which is 22 weeks since 2019.

==== LGBT rights ====
The SD has changed and moderated its position on LGBT in Swedish society over the years, currently saying it opposes discrimination on grounds of sexual orientation. Historically, members of SD have criticized a so-called "Homosex Lobby" while claiming they were not hostile to homosexuals and previously opposed government sanctioned adoption to single people and same-sex couples, unless the adopting party are close relatives or already have a close relationship with the child. However, the party has since shifted its stance to supporting same-sex adoption and supports privately funded insemination for single or gay parents. Party leader Jimmie Åkesson has expressed concerns that what he describes as the gradual Islamisation of Sweden will eventually lead to the rights of sexual minorities being violated. The SD supports legal recognition of same-sex marriage in Sweden and civil unions for same-sex couples but argues the church should have the final say on performing the wedding ceremony over the state.

Until the early 2000s, SD-Kuriren (the official SD party newspaper) regularly published articles criticizing LGBT events and describing homosexuality as "perversion", before moderating itself alongside a shift in party ideology. A blog post claiming Stockholm Pride sexualised young children and equating homosexuality with pedophilia titled Botten måste snart vara nådd ("Soon enough we'll hit rock bottom") was published by SD Party secretary Björn Söder on 1 August 2007. The post was widely criticised in the Swedish media as an attack on LGBT people.

An unofficial pride parade called Pride Järva was organised by SD member and former party magazine editor Jan Sjunnesson in the Stockholm suburbs of Tensta and Husby, two areas with large immigrant populations. The event was disavowed by the official Stockholm Pride organisation and the Swedish Federation for Lesbian, Gay, Bisexual and Transgender Rights; in a joint statement, both organisations called Sjunnesson "a person who's spreading hatred towards Muslims on social media [and] who's not supporting LGBT rights". Approximately 30 people participated in Pride Järva, with a larger amount of LGBT and heterosexual anti-racist counter-protestors arriving to oppose them. In 2014, the official Stockholm Pride voted to ban the SD from participating that year, which was met with criticism from both within the party and from some opposition politicians, who argued it was undemocratic.

In recent years, the SD has shifted its stance to being more supportive of LGBT rights and same-sex parenting and marriage by updating and expanding its policies regarding LGBT issues. In 2010, SD leader Jimmie Åkesson and party vice-president Carina Ståhl Herrstedt published an article apologizing for past homophobic statements made by party members, and arguing that mass immigration risked eroding the rights of Sweden's gay community. In its current platform, the SD states "everyone must be treated equally, regardless of sexual orientation, and discrimination must be combated". In a 2018 interview, SD member of the Riksdag and gender-equality spokesperson Paula Bieler stated that homophobes "are not welcome in our party". Since 2018, the SD party program has been updated to support same-sex adoption and parenting. In 2025, the SD proposed constructing a statue in Örebro, dedicated to Muhsin Hendricks, the world's first openly gay imam, who had been shot dead in his car in South Africa, to honour his work for the LGBTQI movement, as well as constructing a statue in Rinkeby to honour the rights of LGBTQI people in the area.

The SD supports gender-affirming surgery, as long as the motive behind it is mental wellbeing, and permission is given by a medical professional.

Gender studies scholars Karlberg, Korolczuk and Sältenberg note that politicians representing the Sweden Democrats are among "the primary actors advancing anti-gender discourses" in Sweden, a discourse they argue contributes to an "insidious de-democratization" by targeting vulnerable groups.

==== Gender equality ====
SD opposes any "negative or positive special treatment on the basis of gender, age, sexual orientation, nationality or ethnic origin" in the labour market.

The party maintains that, collectively, there are biological differences between men and women, some of which that cannot be "observed with the naked eye". Perceived differences between men and women in regards to preference, behaviour and life choices exist due to each individual's choices and does not necessarily have to be "problematic, the result of discrimination nor the result of an oppressive gender power structure".

==== Church policies ====
The party believes that the Church of Sweden should have a special position in Swedish society. In order to protect Swedish cultural heritage, members of the party want to protect the Lutheran tradition in the church elections and counteract secular party-political control of the Swedish Church. SD supports interfaith dialogue but opposes Qur'an recitals or imams delivering Islamic services in churches which the SD claims to be part of "Islamising Swedish society". The SD previously called for the Church of Sweden to be reinstated as a state church but no longer supports this policy, however they continue to support holidays in connection with religious occasions to only include traditionally Swedish and Christian holidays with party leader Jimmie Åkesson stating in a 2014 interview that he wants to protect Christianity as a "system of norms". In Swedish Church Assembly election campaigns, the SD has campaigned on the issue of Christians who are subjected to persecution and hate crimes in Sweden and abroad.

==== Law and order and security ====
The Sweden Democrats support generally increased minimum sentences as well as increased resources and personnel for the police. SD wishes to instate the possibility of life imprisonment without parole for the worst crimes and to repatriate foreign citizens found guilty of serious crimes. SD also wants to establish a public register of individuals convicted of certain sexual crimes. The party also supports increased surveillance of those known to be involved in criminal gangs and terrorism. SD argues for a zero-tolerance law for people who physically attack police officers and emergency workers.

SD previously supported the reinstatement of capital punishment before dropping it as an official policy after the party program was updated in 1998, although individuals within the party continue to support the death penalty for serious crimes such as murder and infanticide and have called for chemical castration of convicted child sexual abusers.

The SD opposes allowing Swedish citizens who joined ISIS to return to Sweden and argues that anyone who joins a foreign terrorist group should be denied state funded assistance. In 2023, SD also stated that Swedes who have travelled to the Gaza Strip to support Hamas should be banned from reentering the country. SD has also emphasised a desire to crack down on abuses and crimes of which the elderly are particular targets.

In 2025, the SD supported passing stricter ownership regulations on AR-15 rifles following the 2025 Risbergska school shooting although some senior party spokespeople expressed opposition to amending gun ownership laws citing the impact it could have on farmers and hunters.

=== Economy ===
The Sweden Democrats have described themselves as supporters of the Swedish welfare state, labour rights and the public sector, but argue that welfare should be restricted to Swedish citizens and permanent residents. The party argues that foreign-born nationals must show proof of legal residence, paid taxes and financial self-support for a certain period to become eligible for welfare. In its platform, the SD claims that its economic policies are neither left or right-wing, but designed to improve conditions for small and medium-sized companies, self-employed citizens and entrepreneurs to boost employment and stimulate the economy, as opposed to what it describes as "constructed jobs" created by the state to reduce unemployment but hold no long term benefit for the Swedish economy or career paths for the people who work them. SD wants to abolish the Swedish Employment Service in its current form and replace it with a new authority for the supervision and close regulation of private employment services to ensure large corporations do not exploit or undercut Swedish workers. The party supports affordable and free access to public healthcare for Swedish nationals.

SD supports certain free trade conditions but believe Sweden must exit or revise trade agreements that pose a threat to Sweden's sovereignty and Swedish workers. The party favours certain measures of economic protectionism and support state-ownership of companies that operate Swedish mines, agricultural land and produce energy or defense equipment. However, SD also support abolishing inheritance tax and reducing property tax. Since the 2010s, the SD has been critical of Chinese government involvement in infrastructure projects and trade deals with Sweden. SD wishes to lower the tax rate for the elderly, as well as increase subsidised housing for the elderly. SD also wishes to allocate additional resources to municipalities in order to provide seniors with greater food assistance and, in general, improve their quality of life.

Political author Anders Backlund described the party as "economically centrist", leaning towards economic nationalism (in contrast to the other Swedish conservative parties who tend to favour open free markets and global cosmopolitan philosophies) and supporting a mixed market economy combining centre-left and centre-right ideas, as well as promoting "welfare chauvinist" policies which blend national-populism with socio-economics. According to political scientist Johan Martinsson: "In economic terms, the party is more centrist and pragmatic, with a mixture of left and right-wing proposals".

=== Environment ===
The party argues that, while Sweden should maintain its "active role in global climate cooperation", other countries should reduce their emissions, as it believes Sweden to already be doing enough on that front. The party opposed the Paris agreement, and advocates keeping nuclear power plants as a prominent energy source in Sweden, believing it to be an efficient way to mitigate climate change. They also advocate investing in climate research internationally and funding climate action on a global scale.

==== Agriculture and forestry ====
SD supports creating a specialist law enforcement branch for animal welfare and call for stricter penalties against animal cruelty. In 2017, the SD members of the Riksdag Justice Committee filed a motion calling for extended prison sentences for those found guilty of animal abuse, which was ultimately supported by the other parties. The party opposes EU influence over domestic laws on hunting, farming and forestry within Sweden, calling for such policies to be decided upon by rural Swedes instead of Brussels. SD is also critical of non-stun animal slaughter and want to ban the import of goods that contradict Swedish animal welfare legislation.

=== Foreign policy ===
==== Defense ====
SD wants to increase the number of Swedish Army brigades to seven from 2021's two. The party has stated that it would seek to raise Sweden's defense spending to 2–2.5% of GDP.

The party supports closer military cooperation with neighboring Nordic countries and previously opposed Swedish membership of NATO, instead calling for an alignment without full membership. However, following the Russian invasion of Ukraine the SD leadership announced it would consider changing its policy to endorse NATO membership and support joining if Finland also applied for NATO membership. It subsequently voted in favor for NATO membership in the Riksdag.

==== European Union ====
The Sweden Democrats support close political co-operation within the Nordic sphere, but are Eurosceptic and against further EU integration and transfers of Swedish sovereignty to the European Union. The party states that it supports European political and economic co-operation to secure trade and combat cross-border organized crime, illegal immigration, Islamism, terrorism and environmental challenges but strongly opposes creating an EU army or policies that could lead to the creation of a Federal European Superstate. The party generally opposes EU regulation over Swedish tax, pensions, asylum policy, environmental and domestic affairs and calls for the national sovereignty and cultural identity of European nations to be prioritized above the EU's political ambitions. SD rejects joining the Economic and Monetary Union by opposing the Euro currency and favors keeping the krona. They also seek to reduce Swedish financial contributions to Brussels, end Swedish participation in bailouts for other EU member states, renegotiate Swedish membership of the Schengen Agreement and opt-out of common asylum agreements, protect freedom of speech and the free access to the internet from EU copyright bills, and are against the accession of Turkey to the European Union.

The party has called for Sweden to renegotiate its membership of the EU and seeks an amendment to the Swedish constitution to make it mandatory that proposed EU treaties and financial transfers be first put to a public vote. The SD believes that if the EU cannot be reformed or attempts to transform itself into a Superstate, Sweden must immediately reconsider its membership via a referendum and prepare to leave the EU. The SD's youth-wing, the Young Swedes (Ungsvenskarna), support a Swedish exit from the EU. In 2023, party leader Åkesson and SD European Union spokesman Charlie Weimers unveiled a new EU strategy with the objective of achieving better negotiation results, increasing Swedish influence and stopping the EU from gaining more power by creating a referendum lock based on the UK European Union Act 2011 in the Riksdag to prevent transfer of powers to Brussels without a mandatory public vote. SD argues that a referendum lock should be used to prevent further EU expansion to include Turkey, Albania and Balkan states. The SD has also said it wants a Swedish exit from the EU be made possible by removing all references to membership in the constitution and would appoint a panel of experts to determine the best strategy to leave the EU. In 2025, the Sweden Democrats stated that while they remain critical of the EU, they believe EU funds are necessary and pragmatic in the current climate for European military rearmament, with the party citing the war in Ukraine and deteriorating security situation between the United States and Europe.

==== Russia ====
The SD has taken a strongly pro-Ukraine position following the 2022 Russian invasion of Ukraine and has called on Sweden and Western governments to help the Ukrainian people defend their homeland. Åkesson said in 2024 that the SD stands fully behind Sweden's support for Ukraine, and that they would continue to do so "as long as the Ukrainian people fight their heroic fight". He also said that sees no limit on how much the EU should send to Ukraine, adding that he supports a future Ukrainian membership in the EU. In 2022, an analysis of votes relating to Russia in the European Parliament found that the SD were the 10th-most critical party in the parliament, having voted against Russian interests 93 percent of the time. The report found that—among all Swedish parties—the SD were the most critical of Russia. Following the Russian invasion, the party got rid of members who had previously expressed support for Putin.

In 2025 and 2026, the SD continued to support increased Swedish military and civilian assistance to Ukraine and measures aimed at strengthening Sweden's defence against Russia. In January 2025, the government and the SD presented Sweden's largest military support package to Ukraine at the time, worth SEK 13.5 billion, marking a shift towards procuring newly produced military equipment for Ukraine. In September 2025, the government and the SD agreed to increase the framework for military support to Ukraine to SEK 40 billion annually for 2026 and 2027. The party has continued to describe support for Ukraine as important for Sweden's and Europe's security, with Åkesson reiterating the party's support for Ukraine in 2025. In February 2026, the government and the SD also presented a further military support package worth SEK 12.9 billion, including funding for long-range drones, ammunition, and air defence.

Ahead of the 2026 Swedish general election, the SD faced scrutiny over alleged pro-Russian links. In September 2026, the anti-racism magazine Expo reported that Polina Malaberg, a political staffer for the SD in the Riksdag, had for years shared pro-Kremlin narratives on social media and had participated in a Russia-linked network, including a 2017 trip to Moscow connected to a Russian influence operation. Malaberg is also the partner of Gustav Gellerbrant, head of the SD's coordination office with the government and a key figure in the Tidö Agreement. Åkesson described the allegations as serious and said they would be investigated, while Gellerbrant subsequently took parental leave and surrendered his access card and computer. The affair prompted renewed criticism from the opposition over possible Russian influence and security risks within the party's political network.

==== Middle East ====
The Sweden Democrats are supportive of Israel. The party favors recognising Jerusalem as Israel's capital and proposes moving the Swedish embassy there. A study by the European Coalition for Israel documented that SD had the most pro-Israel voting record of the Swedish parties in the European Parliament. In 2021, the Israeli government stated that they did not maintain relations with the SD due to "its roots in Nazism" but by 2023 had dropped its non-cooperation stance after SD representatives signed a document of principle with Israeli ministers pledging to combat antisemitism. Between 2023 and 2024, a delegation of senior SD members visited Israel to hold meetings with Knesset politicians and discuss a cooperation pact with the Likud party. The party has also taken a strongly pro-Israel position following the outbreak of the Gaza war, supporting military action to remove Hamas and calling on the Swedish government to review all funding to Palestinian organizations which the SD accuse of spending aid money on terrorism.

SD has advocated a "neutral" position on the Syrian civil war and sent a delegation to meet with Syrian officials in 2017.

==== Other regions ====
In 2011, SD was the only Swedish political party to vote against Swedish involvement in the 2011 military intervention in Libya. SD also supports the creation of an independent Kurdish state and for the Armenian genocide to be formally recognised by the international community. In 2019, SD-member Björn Söder received the Mkhitar Gosh Medal by President Armen Sarksyan and Markus Wiechel received the Medal of Honour of the National Assembly of Armenia. These were the first Sweden Democrats to receive international awards for their political engagement. Since 2022, the SD has participated in bipartisan efforts to give more diplomatic recognition to Taiwan, and supported a motion in the Riksdag to change the name of Sweden's representative office in Taiwan to "House of Sweden". SD politician Markus Wiechel said the name change denotes that Sweden should treat Taiwan as a nation rather than a disputed territory or a province of China. Wiechel also proposed giving military support to Taiwan and said SD sees Taiwan as an independent state. Three SD-members of Parliament (Markus Wiechel, Björn Söder and Nima Gholam Ali Pour) received "Certificate of Appreciation", an award from Taipei Mission in Sweden because of their commitment to strengthen Swedish-Taiwanese relations. SD politician and MEP Charlie Weimers also enhanced Taiwan-EU relations through his motion, which got approval in the European Parliament on closer cooperation between Taiwan and EU.

== Election results ==
=== Riksdag ===
Election	Leader	Votes	%	Seats	+/-	Status
1988		1,118	0.0	0 / 349	Steady	No seats
1991	Anders Klarström	4,887	0.1 (#10)	0 / 349	Steady	No seats
1994	Anders Klarström	13,954	0.3 (#9)	0 / 349	Steady	No seats
1998	Mikael Jansson	19,624	0.4 (#8)	0 / 349	Steady	No seats
2002	Mikael Jansson	76,300	1.4 (#8)	0 / 349	Steady	No seats
2006	Jimmie Åkesson	162,463	2.9 (#8)	0 / 349	Steady	No seats
2010	Jimmie Åkesson	339,610	5.7 (#6)	20 / 349	▲20	Opposition
2014	Jimmie Åkesson	801,178	12.9 (#3)	49 / 349	▲29	Opposition
2018	Jimmie Åkesson	1,135,627	17.5 (#3)	62 / 349	▲13	Opposition
2022	Jimmie Åkesson	1,330,325	20.5 (#2)	73 / 349	▲11	Confidence and supply (M, KD, L government)
2026	Jimmie Åkesson	1,183,248	17.5 (#3)	62 / 349	▼11	TBD

=== European Parliament ===
Election	Votes	%	Seats	+/−	EP Group
1999	8,568	0.34 (#8)	0 / 22	New	−
2004	28,303	1.13 (#9)	0 / 19	Steady	−
2009	103,584	3.27 (#10)	0 / 19	Steady	−
2014	359,248	9.67 (#5)	2 / 20	▲2	EFDD
2019	636,877	15.34 (#3)	3 / 20	▲1	ECR
2024	552,920	13.17 (#4)	3 / 21	Steady	ECR

==== Maps ====
2002: The party's share of the vote by municipality (darker shades indicate a higher percentage of votes)

2006: The party's share of the vote by municipality (darker shades indicate a higher percentage of votes)

2010: The party's share of the vote by municipality (darker shades indicate a higher percentage of votes)

2010: The party's share of the vote by municipality (lighter shades indicate a higher percentage of votes)

2014: The party's share of the vote by municipality (darker shades indicate a higher percentage of votes)

2018: The party's share of the vote by municipality (darker shades indicate a higher percentage of votes)

2022: The party's share of the vote by municipality (darker shades indicate a higher percentage of votes)

2026: The party's share of the vote by municipality (darker shades indicate a higher percentage of votes)

== Organization ==
=== Leadership ===
==== Party leaders ====
Party leader		Time in office
1.	Anders Klarström	1989 – 1995
2.	Mikael Jansson	4 March 1995 – 7 May 2005
3.	Jimmie Åkesson	7 May 2005 – 2014
4.	Mattias Karlsson	2014 – 2015 (interim)
5.	Jimmie Åkesson	2015 – present

==== Deputy Party leaders ====
First Deputy		Time in office
1.	Jonas Åkerlund	2006 – 2015
2.	Julia Kronlid	2015 – 2019
3.	Henrik Vinge	2019 – present

Second Deputy		Time in office
1.	Jonas Åkerlund	2005 – 2006
2.	Anna Hagwall	2006 – 2009
3.	Carina Ståhl Herrstedt	2009 – 2019
4.	Julia Kronlid	2019 – present

==== Secretaries ====
Secretary		Time in office
1.	Jakob Eriksson	1998 – 2001
2.	Jimmy Windeskog	2001 – 2003
3.	Torbjörn Kastell	2003 – 2004
4.	Jan Milld	2004 – 2005
5.	David Lång	2005
6.	Björn Söder	2005 – 2015
7.	Richard Jomshof	2015 – 2022
8.	Mattias Bäckström Johansson	2022 – present

International secretary		Time in office
1.	Kent Ekeroth	2007 – 2017
2.	Peter Lundgren	2017 – 2022
3.	Mattias Karlsson	2022 – present

==== Parliamentary group leaders ====
Parliamentary group leader		Time in office
1.	Björn Söder	2010 – 2014
2.	Mattias Karlsson	2014 – 2019
3.	Henrik Vinge	2019 – 2023
4.	Linda Lindberg	2023 – present

==== Party treasurer ====
Treasurer		Time in office
1.	Bo Broman	2019 – present

==== Party spokespeople ====
Spokespersons		Time in office
1.	Leif Zeilon and Jonny Berg	1988 – 1989
2.	Ola Sundberg and Anders Klarström	1989 – 1990
3.	Anders Klarström and Madeleine Larsson	1990 – 1992

=== Internal structure ===
The Sweden Democrats are made up of 16 districts of local party associations with executive boards. Each district consists of a number of municipal associations, which may include one or more municipalities. In municipalities that are not covered by a municipal association, the party organises its members as working groups instead. The SD also has a centralized national board permanently chaired by the party leader and party secretary and whose other members are elected by the SD's membership base.

Within the SD there is a women's branch SD-Women and an affiliated youth-wing Young Swedes SDU which was founded in 2015. The SD's first youth-wing was founded in 1993 as the Sweden Democratic Youth Association before it was renamed the Sweden Democratic Youth (SDU). The old SDU was disbanded in 1995 due to extremism problems before it was reconstituted in 1998. Many prominent SD politicians including party leader Jimmie Åkesson were members of the SDU. In 2015, the SD announced it would expel the leadership of the SDU from the mother party and officially sever ties with it due to ongoing controversies with its members. The party subsequently created the Young Swedes SDU as a replacement.

Following the 2010 Swedish general election, the SD created its own security unit which by 2014 consisted of an estimated 60 people. SD states that the unit is intended to handle internal issues within the party, including cybersecurity, to marshal public events and to encourage members to report external threats to the police. The SD has argued the security wing is necessary due to threats against SD politicians and highlighted a 2012 report by the Swedish National Council for Crime Prevention which found one in two of every local SD politician had experienced some form of threat, harassment or physical violence, and that SD legislators were statistically twice as more likely to be threatened than members of other parties. SD reported 95 instances of threats or violence against elected officials to the police and Riksdag security in 2012.

=== Associated organisations and media ===
Since its founding, the SD has published its own newspaper SD-Kuriren which was previously known as Sverige-Kuriren and then SD Bulletin until 2003. Party secretary Richard Jomshof currently serves as the paper's editor. In 2014, the party also launched an online magazine Samtiden ('Contemporary'). It is currently edited by Swedish economist Dick Erixon.

In 2020, Mattias Karlsson, the former group leader of the Sweden Democrats in the Riksdag founded Oikos, a conservative think-tank. Expo has alleged the think-tank to be an "extension of the Sweden Democrats' political project" supposedly also receiving funding from the party although the group itself claims to be non-partisan.

In 2020, the party also helped to launch a web based TV channel called Riks, through their wholly owned online magazine Samtiden, with the ambition that the media channel should not be an official party TV. However, in a 2024 investigatory exposé conducted by TV4’s investigatory branch, Kalla fakta, it was discovered that Riks and the SD are in a close-knit relationship with each other. For example, the exposé showed that Riks rents its office spaces from the Sweden Democrats, and that members of the SD and Riks come into frequent contact with one another, moving freely between each other's offices. Moreover, the SD's communications department instructed Riks to hide any connection to SD before an Expressen interview with Dick Erixon in Riks' offices. In addition to that, the programme showed that the SD's communications department used anonymous social media accounts to artificially disseminate Riks' posts and YouTube videos.

=== Voter demography ===
According to Statistics Sweden's (SCB) 2017 party preference survey, the Sweden Democrats (SD) have a stronger support among men than among women. There is no noticeable difference in support for the party among different age groups. The support for SD is greater among native born than among foreign born. Since 2014 the SD has substantially increased its support among both foreign-born and foreign-background voters, becoming the third largest party in Sweden also among this demographic by 2017. Sympathies are greater for the party among persons with primary and secondary education than among those with a higher education.

A study by Aftonbladet in 2010 found that 14% of SD members were of immigrant origin, which matches the share of foreign-born inhabitants of Sweden, while their vote share in this population group has always been lower. For the 2010 election in the municipality of Södertälje (Stockholm County), SD was the only party with a majority of immigrants on its electoral list, mostly Assyrians from the Middle East. Polling 7.31% (3,447 votes), SD's municipal list in Södertälje got 5 of the 65 municipal seats. Since 2014, the SD has seen growing support from foreign-born Swedish voters, and was estimated to have become the third most popular party for voters of immigrant backgrounds by 2017. In recent years, politicians of ethnic minority and immigrant backgrounds have become increasingly active in the party, with notable examples including Nima Gholam Ali Pour, Kent Ekeroth, Sara Gille Arin Karapet and Rashid Farivar.

Preference for SD	May 2014	May 2017	May 2018	May 2020	May 2022
All voters	6.0%	13.5%	14.7%	16.7%	16.5%
Male	8.7%	17.9%	19.7%	22.8%	23.3%
Female	3.4%	9.2%	9.7%	10.5%	9.6%
Native born	6.5%	13.9%	15.3%	17.4%	17.2%
Foreign born	1.8%	10.7%	11.3%	11.8%	12.1%
Swedish background	6.7%	13.7%	15.2%	24.4%	25.1%
Foreign background	2.0%	12.8%	12.0%	14.7%	14.3%

Preference for SD and education	May 2014	May 2017	May 2018	May 2020	May 2022
All voters	6.0%	13.5%	14.7%	16.7%	16.5%
Primary education	9.6%	17.5%	19.1%	23.5%	21.1%
Secondary education	7.7%	17.5%	19.8%	22.0%	22.3%
Post-secondary education less than three years	2.5%	10.4%	7.8%	10.0%	11.8%
Post-secondary education three years or more	1.7%	4.8%	6.0%	6.7%	6.5%

Preference for SD and income	May 2014	May 2017	May 2018	May 2020	May 2022
All voters	6.0%	13.5%	14.7%	16.7%	16.5%
Lowest quintile	7.2%	11.9%	14.5%	13.8%	13.8%
Second quintile	7.2%	16.1%	15.0%	16.6%	15.7%
Third quintile	6.2%	15.3%	15.1%	18.8%	18.8%
Fourth quintile	6.0%	13.5%	17.6%	19.0%	20.1%
Highest quintile	4.7%	11.6%	11.6%	14.8%	14.4%

Preference for SD and socioeconomic group	May 2014	May 2017	May 2018	May 2020	May 2022
All voters	6.0%	13.5%	14.7%	16.7%	16.5%
Unskilled blue-collar workers	8.9 %	16.3%	20.6%	24.1%	24.5%
Skilled blue-collar workers	9.5%	22.6%	22.1%	26.3%	27.8%
Lower level white-collar worker	6.3%	12.2%	12.1%	11.8%	13.8%
Middle level white-collar workers	2.9%	8.7%	10.7%	12.6%	11.8%
Higher level white-collar workers	2.3%	7.2%	7.7%	10.7%	8.3%
Self-employed (including farmers)	6.2%	16.3%	17.7%	24.8%	23.3%
Other businessmen (including farmers)	12.2%	21.8%	16.7%	27.0%	23.3%
Students	3.3%	6.7%	12.6%	6.5%	n/a

==== Changes in voter base at the general elections, 2006–2022 ====
Group/Sex	2006	2010	2014	2018	2022
Blue-collar workers	3%	6%	11%	24%	29%
White-collar workers	1%	2%	6%	12%	15%
Businessmen and farmers	2%	4%	8%	23%	24%
Male	2%	5%	16%	22%	25%
Female	1%	3%	10%	12%	16%

=== International relations ===
In its early days, the Sweden Democrats was known to associate itself with both native Swedish and wider European extreme-right activist groups and political parties. In 1997, the Sweden Democrats made connections with the French National Front (FN) and Jean-Marie Le Pen after SD spokesman Johan Rinderheim participated in the conference that established Le Pen's Euronat initiative and the SD received support from the FN in 1998. The SD also founded the NordNat alliance of Nordic nationalist parties in 1997 which also contained the Finnish Patriotic People's Movement, the Danish National Party and the Fatherland Party of Norway, but otherwise the SD did not actively seek formal relationships outside of Sweden. During the late 1990s and early 2000s, the SD began distancing itself from extreme-right parties. The SD broke ties with Euronat in 1998 and NordNat in 1999 and became more influenced by the neighboring Danish People's Party (DF). By the late 2000s the SD said it had ceased regarding the National Front as a role model and instead saw the DF as a sister party. In 2010, party secretary Björn Söder published an article disowning the SD's older connections to extreme or neo-fascist groups or individuals like Le Pen and said SD was more focused on Sweden's issues over interacting with foreign parties. The party has also been active within counter-jihad networks, explicitly from 2007 to 2011.

In Europe, SD has had some contacts with the Austrian FPÖ, the Dutch Party for Freedom and Forum for Democracy, the Flemish Vlaams Belang and the now defunct Belgian People's Party over the early 2010s. The Danish People's Party was initially indifferent on collaborating with the SD until 2010 when Pia Kjærsgaard travelled to Sweden to help with the party's general election campaign. Shortly after, Danish People's Party foreign affairs spokesman Søren Espersen hosted the SD's conference and said both parties would work together in the Nordic Council. Before the European election of 2014 there was some speculation that the SD would enter a grouping with other European nationalist parties led by Marine Le Pen. SD politicians confirmed they had had met with representatives from the proposed group but said the talks were informal. The Danish People's Party reportedly threatened to end ties with SD if they joined the group, stating that while they were willing to work with the SD and the Dutch Freedom Party, they opposed inclusion of parties like the National Front and the FPÖ. However, after the election the SD began to distance itself from other European far-right parties and elected to become a member of the more moderate Europe of Freedom and Direct Democracy (EFDD) group with the UK Independence Party. The SD was also active in the European Alliance for Freedom and the Alliance for Direct Democracy in Europe (ADDE) Euro parties with members of the UK Independence Party (UKIP). In 2016, Marine Le Pen stated that the Sweden Democrats were no longer in official cooperation with her party.

In 2015, SD began forging closer relations with the Danish People's Party, and in 2018 announced an official cooperation pact with the Finns Party, which had previously distanced itself from the SD. All three parties are members of the Nordic Freedom group in the Nordic Council. Politicians of the Norwegian Progress Party have called for official collaboration with the SD, although the Progress Party's leadership has traditionally not supported any partnership and turned down joining with the Sweden Democrats on the Nordic Council. In 2022, Progress Party leader Sylvi Listhaug officially endorsed the SD during the 2022 Swedish general election and said that while her party shares common ground with the Sweden Democrats on immigration and law & order policies, differences in economic views prevented her from forming a direct alliance with the SD.

The SD maintained cooperation with the Alternative for Germany party under Frauke Petry's leadership when both parties sat with the EFDD group and were members of the ADDE alliance, with Jimmie Åkesson describing the AfD as the SD's "sister party" in Germany during the 2017 German federal election. However, Åkesson has since distanced the SD from statements made by some AfD politicians and by 2024 said the AfD was no longer ideologically compatible with his party.

Since 2018, the SD has been a member of the European Conservatives and Reformists Group (ECR Group) and the European Conservatives and Reformists Party and presently sits alongside Brothers of Italy, the Czech Civic Democratic Party, Spanish Vox party, the Flemish N-VA, Polish Law and Justice, the Finns Party and JA21 from the Netherlands. In 2019, there was discussions on whether the SD would join a new group with the Danish People's Party headed by Matteo Salvini's Lega Nord. However, Åkesson said SD was not invited to join a new European Parliament group and would stay with the ECR but suggested this may have been due to his party's reluctance to cooperate with Le Pen and pro-Putin parties in Europe. In 2024, the SD sought to distance itself from Hungary's Fidesz citing what they perceive as Viktor Orbán's soft stance on Russia following its invasion of Ukraine and threatened to leave the ECR if Fidesz joined unless Orbán demonstrated a more pro-NATO and Putin-critical position. However, the Sweden Democrats later softened its stance against Fidesz and said it was open to working with the party in the European Parliament, but maintained it would not cooperate with Alternative for Germany and cast doubt on an alliance with the French National Rally.

In July 2024, the Sweden Democrats formed the European Parliament 'Nordic Freedom' alliance within the ECR along with the Denmark Democrats and the Finns Party, citing common stances on opposing Russian influence, reducing the EU's intervention into the market, and a desire to participate in governments.

Outside of the EU, SD has had informal contacts with the British Conservative Party and the US Republican Party. Individual politicians of the Norwegian Progress Party have also called for more collaboration with the SD. The SD has also sought to improve and build relations with Israel's Likud which had previously turned down meetings with the SD due to the party's past. In 2024, the SD and Likud began official cooperation with each other.

== Public profile and perception ==
=== Early image ===
During the 1980s and early 1990s, several outspoken far-right and Nazi advocates were involved with the party. It was founded by, among others, the Swedish Waffen-SS veteran Gustaf Ekström and members of both older Nazi and neo-Nazi organisations. In its early days, the SD also had a reputation for attracting biker and skinhead gangs to its rallies before disconnecting itself with neo-Nazi and skinhead movements in the mid-1990s. The party had flyers printed by the French National Front in the 1998 general election, and was financially backed for the 2004 European election by Belgian businessman and racial conspiracy theorist Bernard Mengal. In the 1990s, the party was a member of the Euronat initiative which was set up by Jean-Marie Le Pen before severing ties with it in 1999. In 1999, the party program was updated to state its opposition to Nazism: "The Sweden Democrats reject with the same contempt Nazism, whose leitmotif is the Fuhrer principle, racial superiority and aggressive war, and which can be seen as a mirror image of and a reaction to Marxism." In 2005, the SD acknowledged that it had contained people with extreme political views at the time of its establishment but denied that it was founded as a neo-Nazi party or had ever endorsed fascist and national socialist ideas in its manifesto. As part of the moderation process, the Sweden Democrats began expelling extreme far-right members from the early 2000s onwards and in 2010 updated the party constitution to include clauses against racism, extremism and criminal behaviour. Since the 2010s, the SD has also sought to distance itself from far-right parties in Europe, including turning down an invitation to join an alliance in the European Parliament with the French National Front in 2014 and choosing to ally themselves with more moderate parties during the 2014 and 2019 European elections.

In June 2025, the SD leadership issued an official apology for the party's historical links to neo-fascist and neo-Nazi figures and groups, with SD spokesman Mattias Karlsson stating "That there have been clear expressions of antisemitism and support for National Socialist ideas in my party's history, I think, is disgusting and reprehensible. I would like to reiterate the party's apology, above all to Swedish citizens of Jewish descent who may have felt a strong sense of insecurity and fear for good reasons."

=== Isolation in parliament ===
Both before and after the 2010 Swedish general election all the major parties, including the Swedish Social Democrats and the Moderate Party, declared they would not collaborate or work with the Sweden Democrats. The move was described by international pundits as an unofficial cordon sanitaire. The policy of non-cooperation was kept in place for the 2014 Swedish general election. Following the 2018 general election, which saw the disintegration of the centre-right Alliance, Christian Democrats leader Ebba Busch and Moderates leader Ulf Kristersson signaled an end to the non-cooperation policy and began talks with the SD. The policy of non-cooperation was officially scrapped by the Moderates, Christian Democrats and The Liberals for the 2022 election when all four parties signed the Tidö Agreement.

=== Media boycotts ===
The Sweden Democrats have complained about difficulties buying advertising space before elections due to the media banning the party from advertising and have accused media outlets of political bias and trying to censor or limit the party's campaign messages during elections. This has been criticised by free speech organisations in Sweden and abroad. On 16 June 2006, Dagens Nyheter and Svenska Dagbladet decided to stop their boycott. Expressen, however, still retains a ban on Sweden Democrat advertising. During the 2010 Swedish general election, broadcaster TV4 refused to air a Sweden Democrats campaign video which depicted a Swedish pensioner being outrun by burka-clad women with prams. TV4's decision was criticized by both free speech advocates and politicians from Denmark, including by Danish People's Party leader Pia Kjærsgaard, Venstre and the Conservative People's Party (the latter of whom reacted to TV4's decision to ban the video by calling for international election observers to be sent to Sweden), and by members of the Norwegian Progress Party who called the decision a "violation of democratic rules". The SD subsequently uploaded the video to YouTube where it was viewed over a million times. Swedish political journalist Hanne Kjöller argued that attempts to censor the SD in 2010 by the media and left-wing protest groups ultimately backfired and ended up emboldening their support by giving them more publicity.

=== Muhammad cartoon debate ===
After the Danish daily newspaper Jyllands-Posten published twelve cartoons depicting Muhammad and ignited a controversy during the 2005 autumn and winter, the Sweden Democrats gave their unreserved support to the publication with reference to the freedom of speech. SD stated that it saw no reason why a Danish newspaper should be forced to abide by Muslim rules and prohibitions regarding expression. When the boycott of Danish products was launched in the Middle East, SD launched a "Buy Danish" campaign in support of Danish workers. In 2006 SD entered the Muhammad cartoon debate by publishing a cartoon depicting Muhammad on its youth league (SDU) and SD-Kuriren (pronounced [ˈɛ̂sːdeːkɵˌriːrɛn]) websites. The cartoon showed Muhammad from behind holding a mirror in front of his face. However, instead of any facial features, the mirror showed only a blank head. The cartoon was captioned "Muhammad's Face" (Swedish: Muhammeds ansikte [mɵˈhǎmːɛds ˈânːsɪktɛ]).

The publication attracted the attention of the Swedish government, which informed internet service provider Levonline about the SD's publications. Subsequently, Levonline shut down SD's web page. The Minister for Foreign Affairs, Laila Freivalds, denied any direct interference. However, at the same time, Laila Freivalds condemned the publication as a provocation. Freivalds then resigned from the Persson Cabinet after being accused of interference with press freedom and lying about such actions.

This event spurred debate on government censorship in Sweden. The Sweden Democrats also had a hate speech charge filed against them due to the posted caricature. Similar hate speech charges were filed against other Swedish publishers who had depicted Muhammad. However, these charges were immediately deemed to be unfounded by the Swedish Chancellor of Justice.

The Sweden Democrats originally planned to publish a set of cartoons in their newspaper SD-Kuriren. However, after the controversy erupted, Jimmie Åkesson issued a statement on SD's website on 9 February 2006, stating that they would refrain from further publications online and in print, due to concerns that publishing might spur hostile actions against Swedes and Swedish interests.

The shutdown of the Sweden Democrats' websites was reported to the Committee on the Constitution by the Liberal People's Party leader Lars Leijonborg. SD filed complaints against the Security Service (Säpo) and the Ministry for Foreign Affairs with the Justitiekansler and Justitieombudsmannen, alleging that the government's interference was unconstitutional. The spokesperson of the Green Party, Peter Eriksson, also criticised the involvement of the Ministry for Foreign Affairs in the event.

=== Racist incidents and expulsions ===
The Sweden Democrats have, among all Swedish parliamentary parties, had the largest share of elected municipal representatives resign since the 2010 elections (27.8%). Many of these resignations were brought on by racist statements or actions by these representatives.

In November 2012, party spokesperson Erik Almqvist resigned after he had been caught on tape making racist and sexist statements. In November 2012, parliamentarian Lars Isovaara resigned after accusing two people of foreign origin of stealing his bag (which Isovaara had left at a restaurant) and then proceeding to verbally abuse a security guard of a foreign background. Isovaara's replacement in parliament, Markus Wiechel, was found in April 2013 to have referred to a group of black people as "monkeys" in a Facebook comment back in 2011. Wiechel later apologised and stated the comment had been in reference to a video of a tribal witch burning in Africa.

In March 2013, 12 individuals were thrown out of the party for their involvement in neo-Nazi or other extremist movements. In November 2013, parliamentarian and then vice party leader Jonas Åkerlund gained attention for having called immigrants "parasites" during a broadcast on SD's own radio station in 2002, after the recording was publicly rediscovered. In his defence, Åkerlund stated that he only said it to provoke people. In September 2014, the party chairman of the local Stockholm branch, Christoffer Dulny was asked to resign from his position after it was found he had previously posted mocking comments about immigrants, calling them "shameless liars" on alternative media sites. He also resigned from parliament on the same day.

In October 2016, a video of the parliamentarian and economic policy spokesperson Oscar Sjöstedt laughing at antisemitic jokes was released by a former school friend of his who also accused Sjöstedt of chanting fascist slogans. Whilst at a party believed to have been organized by the neo-Nazi group Info-14 in 2011 when Sjöstedt was a member of the SD's youth wing, he laughingly told a story about former co-workers with Nazi sympathies mocking Jews and comparing them to sheep. Following an investigation by the SD, Sjöstedt stated that a friend had invited him to the party but he had walked out upon discovering who had organized it and denied expressing fascist statements. During the same month, the parliamentarian and second deputy party leader Carina Herrstedt was confronted with having sent an allegedly racist, antisemitic, homophobic and anti-romanyist email to her then spouse in 2011. The email, which had been leaked from the party's internal servers, for instance contained phrases that referred to black football players from the team Landskrona BoIS as "negroes" whilst also picturing Romani people as thieves. The email was meant to be playful and ironic, Herrstedt said to Aftonbladet.

Between 2015 and 2016, various members of the party were expelled from the SD for expressing extremist or racist views, or because of disagreement with the party's shift towards moderation and social conservatism. In April 2015, the Sweden Democratic Youth leaders were also expelled for these reasons, and the organisation was dissolved shortly after with the mother party issuing a warning for remaining SDU members to leave the youth wing or be expelled from the party. In December 2016, the parliamentarian Anna Hagwall was thrown out of the party after using arguments associated with antisemitism to argue for a bill that she introduced in parliament intended to reduce concentration of media ownership in Sweden.

In September 2017, a report from Dagens ETC found that 14 former municipal representatives of the party had infiltrated the SD in order to financially support the Nordic Resistance Movement, a neo-Nazi organisation, through financial transactions, memberships, or purchases of antisemitic and racist literature or souvenirs. In August 2018, 2 members were kicked out due to purchases of Nazi memorabilia online; following the expulsions, Michael Erlandsson, one of the SD's spokespeople, publicly stated that people who "have these types of views and share these types of materials" have no place in the party and that the SD maintains a zero-tolerance stance on expressing fascist views. 14 candidates were expelled from the party as well after being exposed as former members of neo-Nazi organisations. Referring to the latest expulsions, SD leader Jimmie Åkesson declared that the party "works extremely hard to keep clean".

In 2017, Martin Strid, party spokesman in Borlänge, appeared to state at a televised SD rally that Muslims were not "fully human" and humane. Strid's comments were met with condemnation within the SD. Åkesson and SD party secretary Richard Jomshof described them as racist, with Jomshof stating the SD advocates ideological criticism, but not violating human rights. SD board member Aron Emilsson said that Strid would face a disciplinary meeting for violating the party's code of conduct. In response, Strid said he had expressed himself "clumsily" but chose to quit the party after being given an ultimatum to resign or be expelled.

In March 2022, parliamentarian Roger Richthoff was sacked from his role as party defense spokesman and subsequently expelled from the SD and banned by the party from standing as a candidate for them in the 2022 Swedish general election after posting controversial comments on Twitter, including sharing a video supporting Russia in the 2022 Russian invasion of Ukraine in which several antisemitic conspiracy theories were presented. In December 2025, parliamentarian Göran Hargestam resigned his seat after a scandal in which he was found to have kept a collection of Nazi memorabilia in an office in Valdemarsvik.

Researcher on Nordic nationalism Benjamin R. Teitelbaum described the present day version Sweden Democrats as paradoxical compared to other European nationalist parties on the issues of racism and radicalism among its members. Teitelbaum notes that in contrast to other Nordic and wider European populist parties, the SD differs by having a past rooted in white nationalism and extremism, but in the present day is comparably more proactive in rejecting ethno-nationalism and expelling members who make racist statements to the point where he considers the SD to be on the "softer side" of national-populism. Similar observations were made by British conservative author Douglas Murray who described the SD as undergoing one of the most significant transformations on the European political right from a party on the fringes that openly pushed extreme tendencies to a more mainstream movement that draws on diverse support. Kateřina Lišaníková argued that out of all the parties in Sweden, the SD was more likely to attract individual members who made extreme statements regarding immigrants but this was a consequence of the SD being the only party in the Riksdag willing to challenge the political consensus on immigration for several years as opposed to the SD itself being an extremist or racist party.

Ashley Fox, leader of the British Conservative MEPs, praised the Sweden Democrats regarding the party's policy decisions on the expulsion of extremist and racist members: "Over the past decade the Sweden Democrats have made progress in reforming themselves, expelling any members displaying unacceptable views or behaviour and diversifying their party base."

=== Iron pipe scandal ===
On November 14, 2012, Erik Almqvist, in addition to party spokesperson Kent Ekeroth and party official Christian Westling were filmed arming themselves with iron pipes before they sought out a confrontation with Soran Ismail, a Swedish comedian of Kurdish descent.

=== Splinter parties ===
Since the SD's inception, breakaway parties have been formed by former SD members, many of whom were either removed from the party due to controversial actions or resigned after the SD began to ideologically shift and moderate itself.

In 1995, former SD spokesman Leif Zeilon established the Homeland Party along with other founding members of the SD after Anders Klarström was replaced as party chairman by a less hardline leadership.

In 2001, a major breakaway occurred when the more radical ethno-nationalist faction of the SD's national board and their supporters were collectively expelled and formed the National Democrats party.

On 18 March 2018, Alternative for Sweden (AfS) was formed by former members of the SD's old youth wing after they were kicked out of the party after alleged ties with extremist groups and for coming into conflict with the mother party. Three SD parliamentarians joined Alternative for Sweden but all lost their seats during the 2018 general election. AfS's policies have been criticised as too extreme by members of the SD such as Henrik Vinge.

=== Lobbying ===
The Sweden Democrats came under fire in 2015 for changing their position on profits made by private welfare companies. Before the election in 2014 they favored having restrictions on the amount of profit that welfare companies could take and use for their own gain. Since the election, they have favored the approach of the Alliance parties, that is higher and more restrictive quality standards. This has been suspected to be because of extensive lobbying done by the organisation Svenskt Näringsliv among others. The story was discovered by the Swedish newspaper Dagens Industri on 14 September 2015. SD has denied all accusations of corruption.

=== Anonymous social media accounts ===
On May 7, 2024, one month prior to the 2024 EU elections, the TV4 investigative journalism program Kalla fakta ('Hard Facts') premiered a two-part documentary (Undercover i trollfabriken, 'Undercover in the Troll Factory') revealing that the Sweden Democrats systematically used anonymous accounts on social media platforms such as TikTok, X and Facebook. The scoop was obtained through the use of the wallraff method where a reporter spent five months as an employee at the previously SD-owned YouTube channel Riks as well as the party's communications department, documenting internal discussions on the party's communication strategies. The documentary revealed that at least 23 anonymous social media accounts were actually run from SD's communications department, spreading xenophobic content and satirical attacks on opposing politicians from other parties, including deepfake videos. According to Kalla fakta, posts from these accounts reached 27 million views across social media platforms. SD's head of communication, Joakim Wallerstein, repeated earlier claims that the party does not run any anonymous social media accounts. However, according to Swedish newspaper Aftonbladet, internal communication reveals that Wallerstein already in 2012 wanted to include anonymous internet campaigns as part of the party's strategy.

In an official response from the Sweden Democrats' leader Jimmie Åkesson, the Kalla fakta documentary was dismissed as a "gigantic, domestic influence operation by the left-liberal establishment". In numerous interviews, SD representatives toned down the content posted on the anonymous accounts as simple satire and humor material. Following the documentary, and the party's response to it, SD received massive criticism from all other Swedish parliamentary parties. The government parties accused SD of not following the Tidö Agreement, which contains a clause about showing respect towards other parties. After a meeting on May 16, SD agreed that some of the anonymous accounts' posts went against the agreement and agreed to delete 45 posts. They did not agree to stop running anonymous accounts but said they would use a softer tone towards parties in the Tidö coalition.

== See also ==
- List of political parties in Sweden
- New Democracy (1991–2000)

== Bibliography ==
- Green-Pedersen, Christoffer; Odmalm, Pontus (2009). Going different ways? Right-wing parties and the immigrant issue in Denmark and Sweden. Immigration and Integration Policy in Europe. Routledge. pp. 53–67.
- Mulinari, Diana; Neergaard, Anders (2012). The Sweden Democrats, racisms and the construction of the Muslim threat. Global Islamophobia: Muslims and Moral Panic in the West. London: Ashgate.
- Mulinari, Diana; Neergaard, Anders (February 2014). "We are Sweden Democrats because we care for others: Exploring racisms in the Swedish extreme right". European Journal of Women's Studies. 21 (1): 43–56. doi:10.1177/1350506813510423. S2CID 46645622.
- Oja, Simon; Mral, Brigitte (2013). The Sweden Democrats Came In from the Cold: How the Debate about Allowing the SD into Media Arenas Shifted between 2002 and 2010. Right-Wing Populism in Europe: Politics and Discourse. London/New York: Bloomsbury. pp. 277–292. ISBN 978-1-78093-343-6.
- Rydgren, Jens (2006). From tax populism to ethnic nationalism: Radical right-wing populism in Sweden. Berghahn Books. ISBN 978-1-84545-218-6.
