= Louise Erixon =

Swedish politician (born 1989)

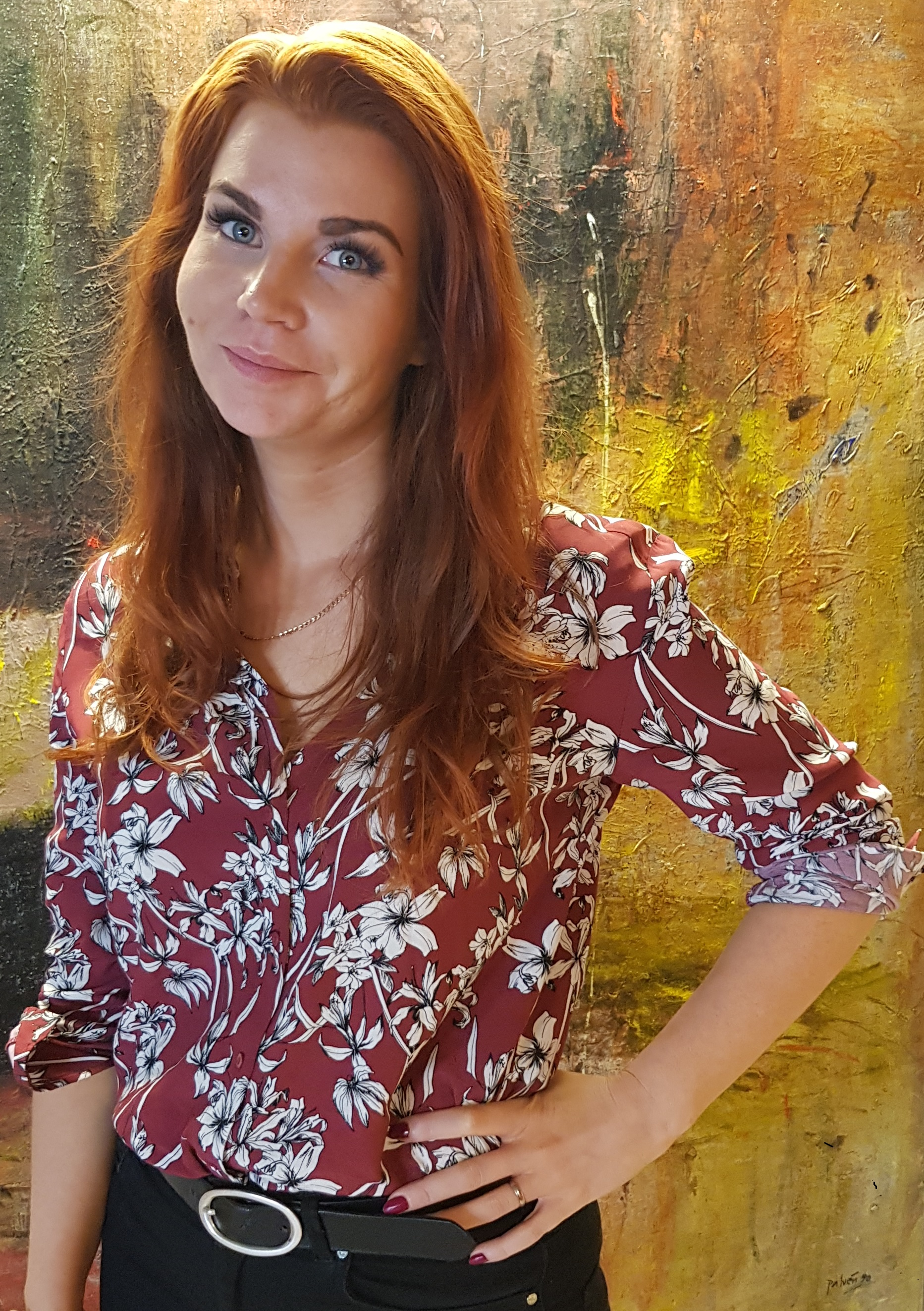

Mayor of Sölvesborg
- In office 1 January 2019 – 1 January 2023
- Preceded by: Heléne Björklund
- Succeeded by: Birgit Birgersson Brorsson

Chairwoman of the Sweden Democrats in Sölvesborg Municipality
- Incumbent
- Assumed office 2019

Personal details
- Born: 7 April 1989 (age 37) Sandviken, Sweden
- Party: Sweden Democrats
- Domestic partner: Jimmie Akesson (2011–2020)
- Children: 1

Louise Erixon (born 7 April 1989) is a Swedish media commentator and politician of the Sweden Democrats party who served as the mayor of Sölvesborg from 2019 to 2023.

== Biography ==
Erixon is the daughter of Örjan Erixon and former Riksdag member of parliament Inger Lindberg (also known as Margareta Gunsdotter). She has described herself as coming from a Christian family and that her parents would read her the Bible as a child.

She first joined the Sweden Democrats in 2006 and became the local leader for the Sweden Democratic Youth (SDU) in Gävleborg in 2007. In 2010, she was elected as a municipal councilor in Gävle. She also worked as an assistant to Sweden Democrats politician Björn Söder. Erixon is a member of the election committee for SD-Women, the women's branch of the party.

In November 2012, she directed criticism at the SDU for not sufficiently supporting the mother party and argued the youth wing should be reformed or disbanded after its leadership defended Erik Almqvist following the so-called iron pipe scandal in which Almqvist was recorded using sexist language.

During the 2018 Swedish local elections, Erixon was elected leader of the municipal board in Sölvesborg Municipality along with Moderate Party representative Paul Andersson. In 2019, she was elected as mayor of Sölvesborg becoming one of the first SD politicians to be elected as a mayor. In 2022, she resigned from the position of Mayor after the coalition agreement between the SD and the Moderates broke down and the Moderates formed a fresh coalition with the Social Democrats.

Erixon has publicly commented on art and culture in Swedish media. As Mayor, she declared public art to be purchased for the municipality should be timeless and classic rather than contemporary art. Following this, Fokus magazine named Erixon as the most powerful cultural politician in the country.

From 2011 to 2020, Erixon was in a relationship with SD leader Jimmie Akesson by whom she has a son. In 2023, Swedish media reported that she was in a relationship with musician Peter London.
