= Jimmie Åkesson =

Swedish politician (born 1979)

Jimmie Åkesson SD
- Åkesson in 2026

Leader of the Sweden Democrats
- Incumbent
- Assumed office 7 May 2005
- Preceded by: Mikael Jansson

Member of the Riksdag
- Incumbent
- Assumed office 4 October 2010
- Constituency: Jönköping County

Chairman of the Sweden Democratic Youth
- In office 21 June 2000 – 7 May 2005
- Preceded by: Jimmy Windeskog
- Succeeded by: Martin Kinnunen

Personal details
- Born: Per Jimmie Åkesson; 17 May 1979 (age 47) Bromölla, Sweden
- Party: Sweden Democrats (since 1995)
- Other political affiliations: Moderate (until 1995)
- Spouse: Matilda Kärnerup (m. 2024)
- Domestic partner: Louise Erixon (2011–2020)
- Children: 1
- Education: Lund University

Per Jimmie Åkesson ([ˈjɪ̌mːɪ ˈôːkɛˌsɔn]; born 17 May 1979) is a Swedish politician and author, serving as leader of the Sweden Democrats since 2005. He has been a member of the Riksdag (SD) for Jönköping County since 2010. He previously served as leader of the Sweden Democratic Youth from 2000 until 2005.

== Early life and education ==
Jimmie Åkesson was born in Ivetofta in Skåne County, but grew up in Sölvesborg in Blekinge County. His father, Stefan, is a businessman who ran a floor laying business and his mother, Britt Marie, was a care provider in a nursing home. Åkesson's parents divorced when he was young and he was raised primarily by his mother.

From 1995 to 1998, Åkesson completed a three-year social studies program at the Furulundsskolan Institute in Sölvesborg. In 1999, he began studying political science, law, economics, human geography and philosophy at Lund University, without graduating, and has stated that he became interested in politics around this time. Prior to working full-time in politics, Åkesson worked as a web developer and founded a web design company BMJ Aktiv with Björn Söder, the former party secretary of the Sweden Democrats.

== Political career ==
=== Youth politics ===
Åkesson was a member of the Moderate Youth League, the youth wing of the Moderate Party, but left the Moderates to join the original version of Sweden Democratic Youth Association (the youth wing of the Sweden Democrats) in 1995, although some sources claim 1994. In interviews, Åkesson has stated that he joined the SD after many of the party's original and more hardline members had left. The magazine Expo claims that Åkesson first contacted the SD in 1994 as a fifteen year old. In his 2013 autobiography, Åkesson wrote that he decided to become a member of the SD on New Year's Eve in 1994 but did not formally sign membership papers until 1995 after the SD's first chairman Anders Klarström had stepped down due to considering Klarström too extreme. He wrote that he was not attracted by neo-Nazi sympathizers in the party and that at the time he supported the SD's "political potential" writing "I was a nationalist and the Sweden Democrats had succeeded, despite their flaws, in formulating a fundamentally sound, democratic and universal nationalism." He said that the SD policies he was most attracted to at first were its view on the European Union and its policy on immigration. In an article for the SDU's magazine in 1997, Åkesson wrote "We had the first contact with SD sometime in December of the same year [1994], and during a meeting at New Year's Eve we decided to start working party politically, and that a local SDU branch would eventually be formed." Journalist and former SD press secretary Christian Krappedal corroborated that Åkesson became a member of the party in the spring of 1995.

In 1995, he also co-founded a local chapter of the Sweden Democratic Youth Association. In 1997, he was elected as a deputy member of the party's national board.

In the 1998 Swedish general election, at the age of 19, Åkesson was elected to public office as a councilman in Sölvesborg Municipality. The same year, he also became deputy chairman of the newly established Sweden Democratic Youth (Sverigedemokratisk Ungdom), and later, from 2000 to 2005, was chairman of the organisation.

=== 2005–present: Party leader ===
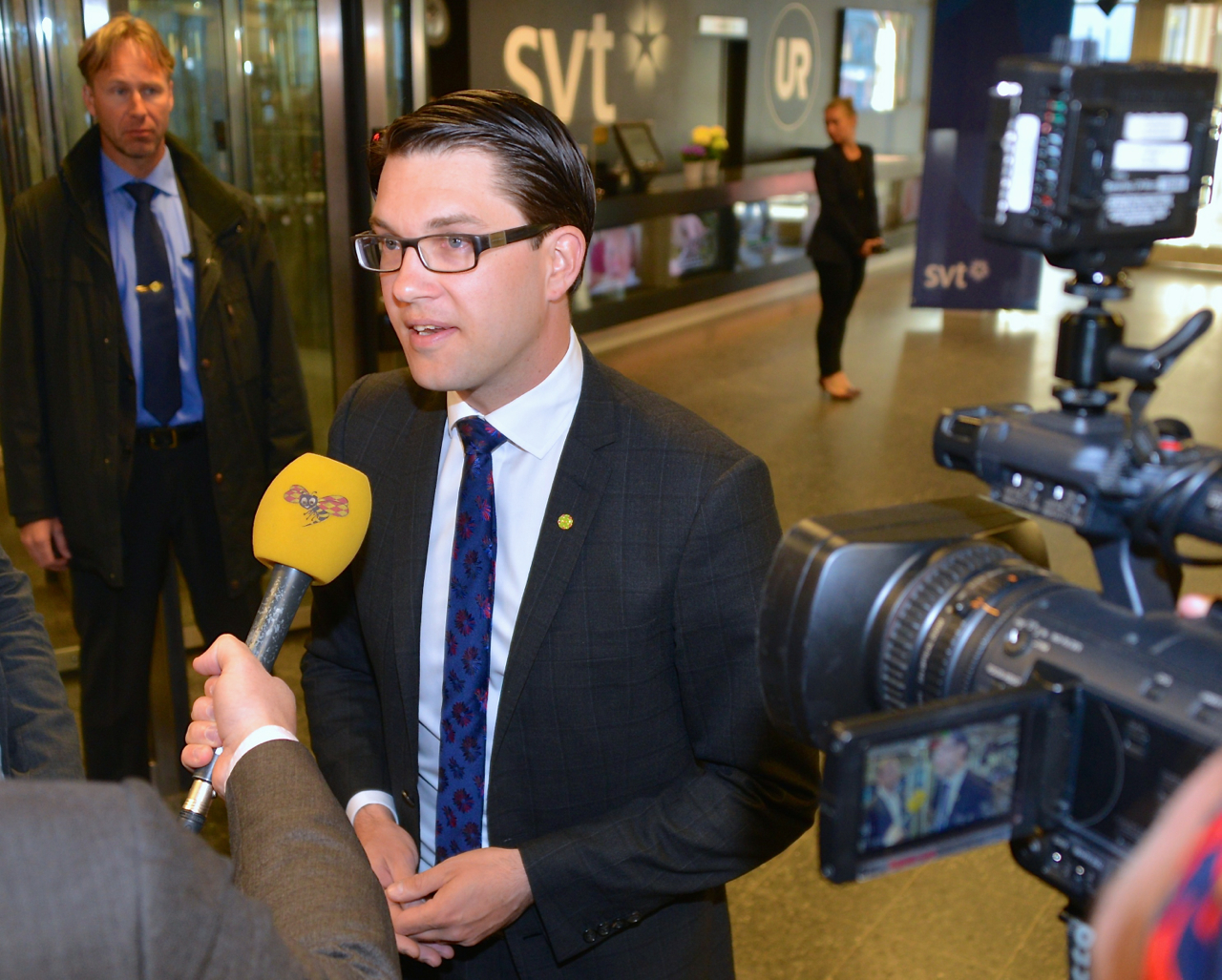
Åkesson being interviewed before an Sveriges Television party-leader debate ahead of the 2014 Swedish general election

In 2005, he defeated party leader Mikael Jansson in a party election to become the party leader of the Sweden Democrats (SD). During his student years at Lund University, Åkesson got to know Björn Söder, Richard Jomshof and Mattias Karlsson with whom he formed the National Democratic Student Association in Lund. The group became known as the "Scania Gang" or "Fantastic Four" within the SD; a political group of younger members who had the goal of taking over the party's leadership and sought to moderate and reform the SD.

In 2009, Sveriges Radio reported that Åkesson along with other prominent SD members sang a scornful song about the assassination of Olof Palme. Åkesson said he should have been more against it, but that the recordings were missing context. He said they sang a wide range of songs, from Jussi Björling to communistic protest songs (Swedish: kampsånger), in a non-political context.

In the 2010 Swedish general election, the SD for the first time crossed the election threshold and entered the Riksdag, with 5.70% of the votes, gaining 20 seats. Åkesson, who was placed first on the party's national ballot, was elected as a Member of the Riksdag (MP) along with 19 of his fellow party members.

In September 2014, Sveriges Radio (SR) reported that Åkesson had spent upwards of 500,000 kronor ($70,000) in 2014 alone on online betting. The sum is more than the politician would have earned all year, after tax, reported SR. The revelation caused an uproar, both among people who view Åkesson as unreliable and those who opposed SR's decision to publish the information. Among the latter were former Green Party Spokesperson Maria Wetterstrand and Foreign Minister Carl Bildt. Åkesson himself called SR's actions an attempt at character assassination.

Following the 2014 Swedish general election, Åkesson announced he would be on sick leave due to burnout. In early 2015, Åkesson was named Sweden's most important opinion leader for the calendar year 2014 by the Swedish magazine DSM in their annual rankings.

On 27 March 2015, Åkesson publicly announced that he would return to his duties as party leader for the SD, albeit initially in a somewhat reduced role, on the SVT program Skavlan, as well as in an open letter on his Facebook page.

In the 2018 Swedish general election, the SD got 17.6% of the votes (+4.7 pp), after the Swedish Social Democratic Party (28.4%, -2.6 pp) and the Moderate Party (19.8%, -3.5 pp). SD had 62 of 349 seats in the next Riksdag.

The SD saw a greater rise in support during the 2022 Swedish general election under Åkesson's leadership with the party overtaking the Moderates to become the second largest in the Riksdag.

In August 2023, the Nobel Foundation invited Åkesson as an official guest as part of the Swedish delegation at the annual Nobel Banquet for the first time having previously denied him an invitation before.

== Political beliefs and public image ==
Detailing his political beliefs in a profile for The Local, Åkesson described himself as a Swedish nationalist, social conservative and a supporter of equality.

During his chairmanship of the Sweden Democrats' youth league and as party leader, Åkesson has sought to moderate the SD's ideology and expel controversial members from the party. During the late 1990s and early 2000s, Åkesson was considered part of a reformist faction on the party's national board that sought to change the SD programme such as abolishing the party's support for the death penalty. Under his leadership from 2005, Åkesson has changed party rhetoric away from ethnic nationalism in reference to Swedish identity to promoting a Swedish culture based on the Folkhemmet (people's home) concept, folklore and Swedish Lutheran traditions. He has said that the SD no longer associates itself with any form of neo-Nazism under his leadership and maintains a zero-tolerance policy on expressions of racism or extremism from its representatives. As SD leader, Åkesson has described his main policy focus to be the areas of law & order, expanding nuclear power and defending Swedish culture and society against mass migration. He has also criticized the other parties in the Riksdag for being too pro-European and undermining Sweden's social solidarity through uncontrolled immigration policies.

In 2009, Åkesson contributed a debate article for Aftonbladet which was critical of multiculturalism and Islam in Sweden where he argued "Islam has influenced Swedish society to a much greater extent than Swedish society has influenced Islam" and that various phenomena associated with Islam were "greatest foreign threat to Sweden since the Second World War." Aftonbladet editorial staff headlined the article with Muslims are our greatest foreign threat. After the column received much attention, Åkesson took part in a debate with by Minister of Economic Affairs and Deputy Prime Minister Maud Olofsson on SVT. Åkesson argued that the point of the article was to say that Muslims who come to Sweden should adapt to a Swedish way of life as opposed to the other way around. The Swedish Center Against Racism reported the article to the office of the Chancellor of Justice as an incitement against an ethnic group. However, the Chancellor of Justice dismissed the complaint and did not initiate an investigation. The opinion polling companies Synovate and United Minds noted that the debate on the article increased voter support for the Sweden Democrats in polls ahead of the 2010 Swedish general election.

In 2013, Fokus magazine named Åkesson as Sweden's fifth most powerful person.

Following the October 7 attacks in 2023, which killed more than 1,000 Israelis, people were spotted celebrating in various Swedish cities. Åkesson immediately stated that these people do not belong in Sweden and that he is open to expelling those who praise terrorism. During a speech on 26 November 2023, Åkesson asserted that Swedish-Palestinians who have travelled to Gaza should not expect help to return to Sweden.

Observers such as Nordic politics scholar Benjamin R. Teitelbaum, journalist Bülent Keneş and political scientist Jonas Hinnfors have described Åkesson as an effective public speaker and media communicator, but have noted that his political image is based on building support through appearing "calm and sensible" and not fitting the typical outspoken and charismatic image of a populist leader.

Åkesson supports a circumcision ban for minors except for Jewish circumcision.

== Personal life ==
Åkesson was engaged to Louise Erixon, a former parliamentary aide to Björn Söder and the daughter of former Sweden Democrats MP Margareta Gunsdotter. Erixon served as the mayor of Sölvesborg from 2019 to 2022, and she was one of the first Sweden Democrats to hold a local mayorship. They have a son, born in 2013.

On 24 April 2020, Erixon announced on her Facebook page that the couple had separated some time previously.

Since 2022, Åkesson has been in a relationship with nutritionist Matilda Kärnerup. They married in 2024.

Outside of politics, Åkesson is also a musician. He plays keyboard and bass for the rock group Bedårande Barn alongside Peter London and has also performed at concerts with the Viking rock band Ultima Thule. Åkesson currently resides in Sölvesborg. According to his personal profile, his main interests are playing golf and watching football. He is a supporter of Mjällby AIF and the Minnesota Vikings.

== Bibliography ==
- (2008): 20 röster om 20 år. Sverigedemokraterna 1988–2008 ISBN 978-91-977376-0-9
- (2009): Åkesson om... Vecka 40–52 2008 ISBN 978-91-977376-1-6
- (2013): Satis polito. ISBN 978-91-981162-0-5
- (2018): Det moderna folkhemmet. ISBN 978-91-981162-4-3

Party political offices
Preceded by Mikael Jansson	Leader of the Sweden Democrats; 2005–present	Incumbent
