= Carina Ståhl Herrstedt =

Swedish politician (born 1971)

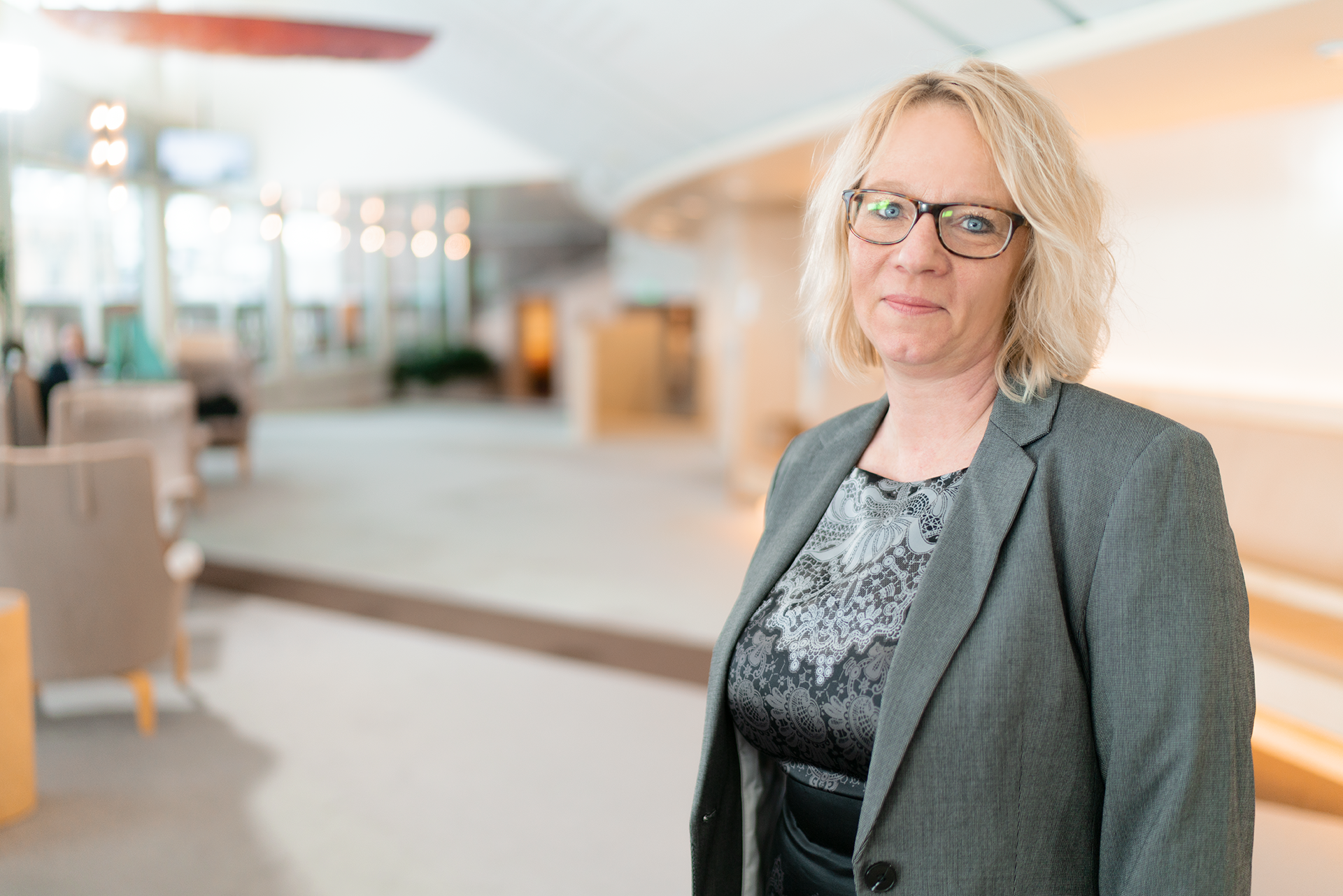

Governor of Gävleborg County
- Incumbent
- Assumed office 1 March 2025
- Appointed by: Ulf Kristersson
- Preceded by: Per Bill

Member of the Riksdag
- In office 19 September 2010 – 28 February 2025
- Constituency: Skåne Western

Personal details
- Born: 26 February 1971 (age 55) Kristianstad, Sweden
- Party: Sweden Democrats

Eve Carina Jessica Ståhl Herrstedt (née Herrstedt; born 26 February 1971) is a Swedish journalist and politician representing the Sweden Democrats currently serving as Governor of Gävleborg County since 2025.

She previously served as a Member of the Riksdag from 2010 to 2025. and second vice-president of the Sweden Democrats (SD) from 2009 to 2019. She was the chairwoman of SD-Women from 2010 to 2019.

== Career ==
Ståhl Herrstedt was employed as a care assistant for a number of years. She initially voted for the Swedish Social Democrats before joining the SD. During the 2010 Swedish general election, she was elected as a representative for the SD and at the same time was elected as a municipal councilor on Landskrona municipal council.

Ståhl Herrstedt argues that immigration should be greatly reduced, and that the money that could be saved for the state in that way should instead be used for health care, education, elderly care and social work. She also supports tougher law & order policies and a social system that "does not discriminate or give special rights to certain groups."

In addition to her political work, she is a columnist for Aftonbladet newspaper. In 2010, she co-wrote an article with SD leader Jimmie Åkesson in which they apologized for homophobic and LGBT-hostile statements made by individual representatives of the Sweden Democrats over the years. At the same time, they warned of the "gay hatred that the increasing Islamization brings." In 2010, she was threatened with a defamation lawsuit by Swedish Communist Party leader Jan Jönsson and his son after she published a number of articles accusing them of criminal activity. Jimmie Åkesson defended her articles by stating "But there are political things behind it and this is about a left-wing extremist in Malmö who reported her. I have no problem with what she did." In 2016, she became the source of some controversy after an email she sent in 2011 to her then partner was leaked to the media and was accused of containing racist and antiziganist content. She later apologised for the email but denied accusations of racism and pointed out the email was intended as an ironic joke and had been copied from a meme on an internet forum.

In February 2025 during a press conference at Gävle Castle, Minister for Public Administration Erik Slottner presented Herrstedt as the new Governor of Gävleborg County, and she took office on 1 March 2025. She is the first Sweden Democrat ever to be appointed to a gubernatorial position.

== Personal life ==
Ståhl Herrstedt lives in Asmundtorp and has been married to fellow SD politician Jimmy Ståhl since 2017. She has two children by her former partner.
