= Gustaf Ekström =

Swedish chemist and politician (1907–1995)

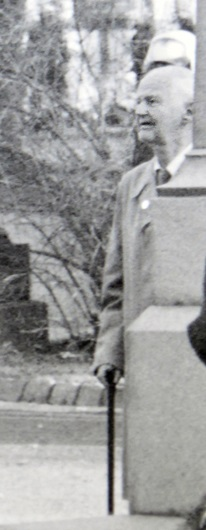
- Gustaf Ekström in Lund 1994
- Born: Hilding Gustaf Sigvard Ekström; 9 October 1907; Stockholm, Sweden
- Died: 16 June 1995 (aged 87); Lund, Sweden

Hilding Gustaf Sigvard Ekström (9 October 1907 – 16 July 1995) was a Swedish chemist, Waffen-SS volunteer, and co-founder of the Sweden Democrats party.

== Biography ==
Gustaf Ekström was born on 9 October 1907 in Hedvig Eleonora Parish, Stockholm, the son of gymnastics director Johan Gottfrid Samuel Ekström from Undersvik and of Hilda Katarina Mickelsson from Färila. Both had been residing in Stockholm since 1899. After his mother's divorce, Gustaf Ekström moved to Lindesberg with his mother and her sister.

Ekström graduated as an engineer and moved to New Jersey in the United States in 1929, where he worked at an oil refinery and later as a sailor. In 1932 he returned to Sweden and joined the Swedish National Socialist Party (SNSP) under the leadership of Birger Furugård, and a year later joined the Swedish Socialist Assembly (SSS) led by Sven Olov Lindholm. In October 1936, he became Federal Secretary of the Nordic Youth. He volunteered to join the Waffen SS in 1941, serving in the 11th SS Volunteer Panzergrenadier Division Nordland. He achieved the rank of SS-Rottenführer and served from 1941 to 1943 at the SS-Hauptamt in Berlin, where he translated, among other things, Swedish newspaper articles to German for the needs of Nazi Germany.

After World War II, Ekström stayed in Germany and studied chemistry. Upon retiring, he returned to Sweden and founded the Sweden Democrats party in 1988, at the age of 81. He was initially elected auditor of the newly formed party and was elected to the party board the following year. He was monitored by SÄPO since 1940 as he was classified as one of the most dangerous Nazis in Sweden and a potential traitor in the event of a German occupation.

He died at the Sankt Hans Assembly in Lund in 1995, and is buried at the cemetery in Färila.
