= Anna Hagwall =

Swedish politician (born 1953)

Member of the Swedish Parliament for Västra Götaland County North
- In office 21 February 2013 – 24 September 2018
- Preceded by: Erik Almqvist

Personal details
- Born: 19 January 1953 (age 73) Nagykanizsa, Hungary
- Party: Sweden Democrats (until 2016); Alternative for Sweden (2018–present)
- Profession: Optician

Anna Hagwall (born 19 January 1953) is a Hungarian-born Swedish politician. She was a member of the Swedish Riksdag from 21 February 2013 until 2018. She was a formerly a member of the Sweden Democrats and served as second deputy leader of the party from 2006 to 2009.

== Biography ==
Hagwall was born in Nagykanizsa, Hungary and came to Sweden in 1972 through her marriage to a Swedish man. She worked as an optician before becoming elected to parliament and held several prominent positions within the Sweden Democrats during the 2000s, including as a member of the party's executive board and for a period as second deputy party leader until her replacement by Carina Ståhl Herrstedt. She was also a councilor for the SD in Rättvik. In 2013, she became a member of the Riksdag to replace Erik Almqvist and was re-elected in the 2014 Swedish general election as a full-time representative for the Västra Götaland County North constituency. She served as a member of the business committee and submitted parliamentary motions to raise the age limit for election to the Riksdag, giving more availability to alternative medicine and supporting construction of new nuclear power plants.

In October 2016, it was announced that Hagwall had been suspended from the Sweden Democrats' parliamentary group and would face a disciplinary meeting with the party leadership after controversy arouse when she submitted a bill in the Riksdag to spread ownership of Swedish media and reduce the Bonnier Group's power in Sweden. She falsely claimed the Bonnier Group owned more than 80 percent of the Swedish media and argued no ethnic group should be allowed to control more than five percent of the media, a statement that several outside and internal party observers interpreted as antisemitic. Around the same time, it was reported that Hagwall had invited writer Karl-Olov Arnstberg to a seminar in the Riksdag when Arnstberg was accused of promoting racist and antisemitic conspiracy theories in his books and articles.

Hagwall stated she would sit as an independent in the Riksdag until the next election, but remain a municipal councilor for the Sweden Democrats in Rättvik. However, the SD also asked Hagwall to give up her local duties and in December 2016 she was expelled from the party due to the October controversies. She has since become a member of the Alternative for Sweden party.
