= Jens Rydgren =

Swedish political sociologist (born 1969)

Jens Rydgren (born 1969) is a Swedish writer, political commentator and a professor of sociology, at Stockholm University. Specialising in research of political sociology, for many years he has studied populist right-wing parties. In 2002 he defended his thesis Political Protest and Ethno-Nationalist Mobilization: The Case of the French National Front in a debate with Sidney Tarrow of Cornell University. He has appeared as an expert on right wing populist parties, including the Sweden Democrats, in various news media.
