= Leif Zeilon =

Swedish politician

Leif Ericsson

Leader of the Sweden Democrats
- In office 1988–1989 Serving with Jonny Berg
- Succeeded by: Anders Klarström; Ola Sundberg

Personal details
- Born: Leif Zeilon; 1950 (age 75–76)
- Party: Sweden Democrats

Leif Zeilon, is a former Swedish politician, and is one of the founders of the Sweden Democrats (Swedish: Sverigedemokraterna) and Bevara Sverige Svenskt.

During the 1970s he was active in Demokratisk Allians (DA), a right-wing pro-democracy group supporting the United States in the Vietnam War. In 1988 he was one of the founders as well as the leaders of the populist party Sweden Democrats and wrote its program. In 1995 he left the Sweden Democrats and according to some sources founded Homeland Party, later renamed the Conservative Party.

== Literature ==
- Larsson, Stieg; Ekman, Mikael (2001). Sverigedemokraterna - Den nationella rörelsen (in Swedish). Ordfront. ISBN 91-7324-877-0.
