= Anders Klarström =

Swedish politician (born 1965)

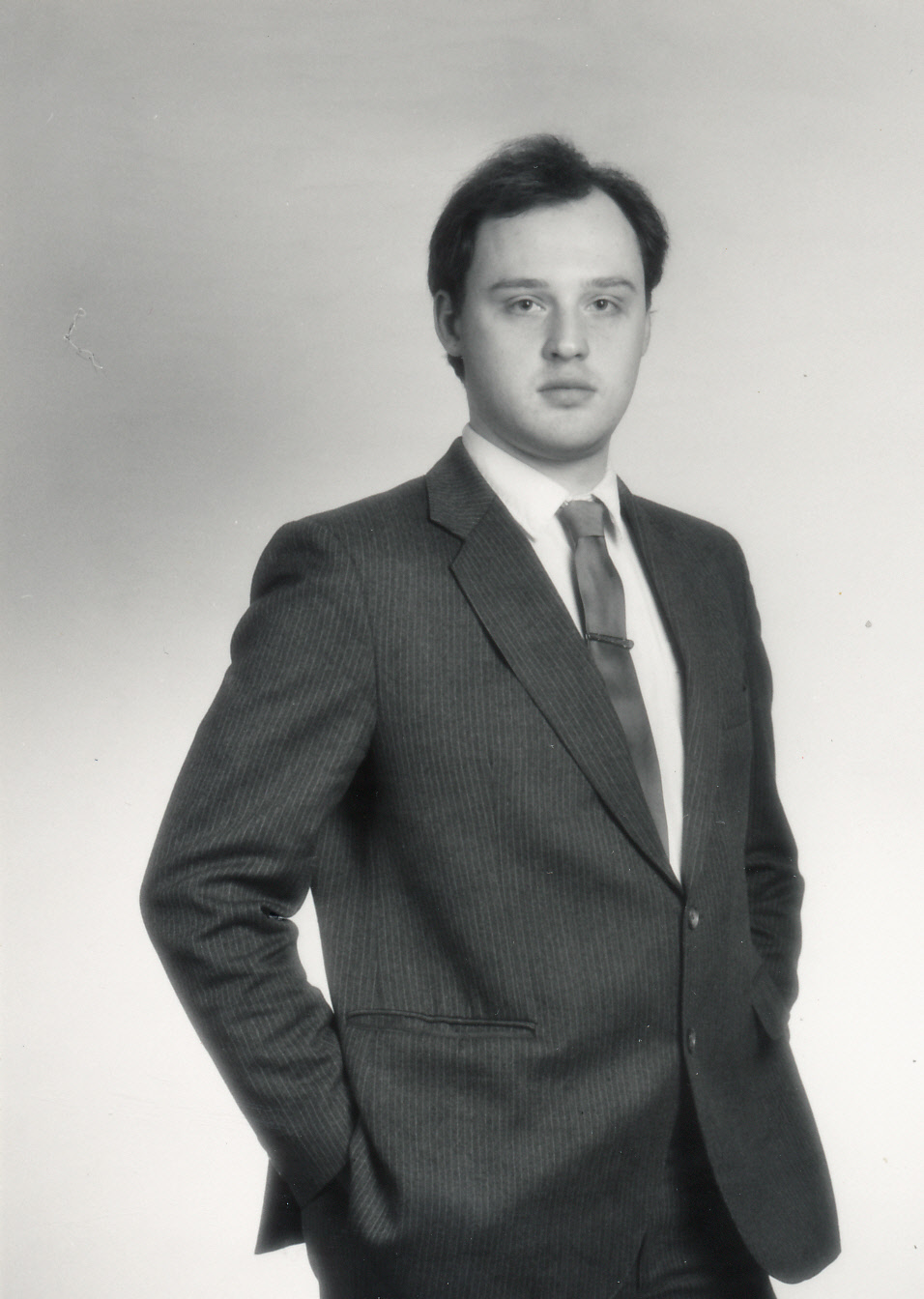
- Klarström in 1990

Leader of the Sweden Democrats
- In office 1989–1995 Serving with Ola Sundberg (1989–1990); Madeleine Larsson (1990–1992)
- Preceded by: Leif Zeilon; Jonny Berg
- Succeeded by: Mikael Jansson

Personal details
- Born: Ralph Carl Anders Klarström; 17 December 1965 (age 60) Gothenburg, Sweden
- Party: Sweden Democrats (1988-1996)

Ralph Carl Anders Klarström, now Rådlund (born 17 December 1965 in Gothenburg), is a retired politician and the first party chairman for the Sweden Democrats 1989–1995.

Klarström became politically active as a teenager, attending meetings of the Moderate Party and then the European Workers Party, the Swedish branch of the LaRouche movement. In 1984, before the founding of the Sweden Democrats, Klarström had been connected with and attended gatherings of the Nordic Realm Party, an old-school national socialist party, as a seventeen year old. In the same year, he was also found guilty of making anonymous antisemitic phone calls to entertainer Hagge Geigert and was fined. He later claimed to have distanced himself from the Nordic Realm Party.

Anders Klarström was a founding member of the Sweden Democrats and participated in writing the first party platform in 1989 and wrote most of the 1993 program ahead of the general election that year. In the very beginning the party did not have a formal leader but a system where two persons acted as joint spokespersons for the party. Klarström held the position from late in 1988 and later became the first "real" party leader. During this time, he also participated in several television debates. He retired from party leadership after the elections of 1994, amid disagreements about political and organisational strategy.

Klarström subsequently left the party and faded from public life until resurfacing with a biographical book in 2018 about the founding and his leadership of the SD. According to Klarström in the book, most of those who formed the party had already left it in 1992, and he was left almost alone in the organization before leaving at the time when a more moderate leadership took over in the mid-90s. A reviewer noted that had Klarström also quit the party along with the other founder members in 1992 and a new leadership hadn't taken over, the Sweden Democrats would have been a "footnote" of history and not grown into the party it is now.
