= SD-Women =

Political women's wing in Sweden

SD Women
- SD-kvinnor
- Formation: 2010–
- Type: Women's wing
- Headquarters: Stockholm, Sweden
- Official language: Swedish
- chairman: Carina Herrstedt (as of 2014)
- Affiliations: Sweden Democrats
- Website: https://www.sdkvinnor.se/

The SD Women (Swedish: SD-kvinnor [ˈɛ̂sːdeːˌkvɪnːʊr]) is a women's wing in Sweden, with connection to the Sweden Democrats. It was established in October 2010.
