= Mikael Jansson (politician) =

Swedish politician (born 1965)

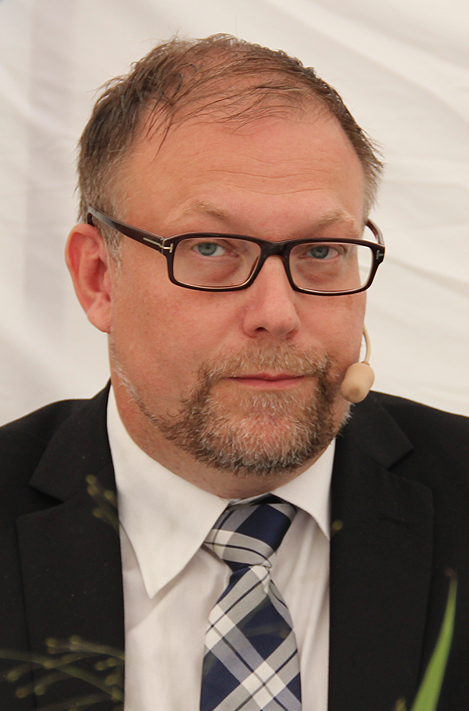
- Jansson in 2013

Deputy Leader of Alternative for Sweden
- Incumbent
- Assumed office 28 November 2020
- Leader: Gustav Kasselstrand
- Preceded by: William Hahne

Member of the Riksdag
- In office 4 October 2010 – 24 September 2018
- Constituency: Gävleborg County

Leader of the Sweden Democrats
- In office 4 March 1995 – 7 May 2005
- Preceded by: Anders Klarström
- Succeeded by: Jimmie Åkesson

Personal details
- Born: Lars-Olof Mikael Jansson; 4 September 1965 (age 60) Umeå, Sweden
- Party: Alternative for Sweden (2018–present)
- Other political affiliations: Centre (1990–1993); Sweden Democrats (1993–2018)
- Children: 2

Lars-Olof Mikael Jansson (born 4 September 1965) is a Swedish politician who was Leader of the Sweden Democrats (SD) from 1995 to 2005. He served as defence spokesman for the Sweden Democrats in the Riksdag from 2010 to 2018. Jansson is currently the Deputy Chairman of Alternative for Sweden.

== Biography ==
=== Early life ===
Jansson was born in Kopparberg in 1965. He studied for a technical diploma in engineering while working in a paper mill in Örebro. He graduated with a qualification in engineering with a specialization in electrical and telecommunications from Lindeskolan school Lindesberg.

=== Political career ===
In 1990, Jansson joined the Centre Party and was for a time the second vice-president in Örebro's Centre Party's county organization and substitute member for the Centre Party in Vasa municipal board in Örebro. In 1993 he switched to the Sweden Democrats, where he in 1994 he was elected second vice president. In 1995 he became the new party chairman of the SD at the party congress in Norrköping replacing SD founder and original leader Anders Klarström. During Jansson's time as leader, the Sweden Democrats took a more direct stance against political extremism and neo-fascism within its ranks and saw a gradual increase in votes during the 1990s and early 2000s. He served as chairman for 10 years. In May 2005, he was challenged for the party leadership by youth-wing chairman Jimmie Åkesson who subsequently defeated Jansson in a leadership contest to become SD chairman. The same year, he released the book I eget spår genom obruten terräng about his time as party leader.

He served as head of the local party district in Gothenburg from 1995-2014 and in the 2006 elections he was elected to the City Council in Gothenburg and also set up as a third candidate to the European Parliament in 2009 on the party's behalf.

Mikael Jansson was the Sweden Democrats' candidate for the post of Second Deputy Speaker of the Riksdag in 2010, but was not elected. Since 2010, he has been a member of parliament, a member of the defence committee, and a spokesperson for the party. During the years 2012–2014, Jansson was a member of the defence commission, which examines future defence policy.

Mikael Jansson is also one of twelve members in the Swedish Export Control Council (ECC), a parliamentary appointed group that advise the Inspectorate of Strategic Products (ISP) on how to deal with war material export issues. The Sweden Democrats party have one seat in total in the council.

Ahead of the 2016 US presidential election between Donald Trump and Hillary Clinton, Jansson expressed his support for Trump in an article in Expressen. Most other MPs either supported Clinton or neither candidate. The only others that supported Trump were fellow SD MPs: Mattias Bäckström Johansson, Josef Fransson, Robert Stenkvist and Anna Hagwall.

On 1 February 2017 the Swedish government decided to start a new defence commission that will be finished in May 2019. Jansson was appointed representative for the Sweden Democrats party.

On 9 April 2018 he defected to the SD breakaway Alternative for Sweden citing the SD's shift in policy to be more open to NATO membership. He lost his seat in the general election held that year.

== Bibliography ==
- I eget spår genom obruten terräng (2005).

Party political offices
Preceded by Anders Klarström	Leader of Sweden Democrats; 1995–2005	Succeeded by Jimmie Åkesson
