= Fredag hela veckan =

- Created by: David Hellenius, Peter Magnusson, Christine Meltzer
- Starring: Josephine Bornebusch; Mackan Edlund; David Hellenius; Ulrika Kjällander; Ulf Kvensler; Peter Magnusson; Andreas Nilsson; Christine Meltzer
- Country of origin: Sweden
- No. of seasons: 2
- No. of episodes: 11

Production
- Running time: 60 minutes

Original release
- Network: TV4
- Release: 5 October 2007 – 12 December 2008

Fredag Hela Veckan (Friday All the Week) is a Swedish TV show on TV4, a Swedish version of Saturday Night Live. It was first broadcast on 5 October 2007. while the final episode aired on 12 December 2008.

Among the famous Swedish comedians in the show, there were David Hellenius, Peter Magnusson and Christine Meltzer, stars from the prior Friday entertainment Hey Baberiba. Other cast members included Josephine Bornebusch, Mackan Edlund, Ulrika Kjällander, Ulf Kvensler and Andreas Nilsson. Kvensler hosted the in-show show Senaste Nytt (Latest News), which is similar to SNL:s Weekend Update.

== Episodes and guests ==
=== 5 October 2007 ===
Guest actor: Paolo Roberto
Music guest: Craig David
Imitations:

- Börje Ahlstedt (Peter)
- Therese Alshammar (Ulrika)
- Carina Berg (Peter)
- Johannes Brost (Mackan)
- Sven-Göran Eriksson (Andreas)
- Hans Fahlén (David)
- Carolina Gynning (Christine)
- Stefan Holm (Peter)
- Susanna Kallur (Josephine)
- Ernst Kirchsteiger (Peter)
- Peder Lamm (David)
- Per Morberg (Peter)
- Tommy Nilsson (Andreas)
- Maud Olofsson (David)
- Mona Sahlin (Ulrika)
- Lill-Babs (David)
- Pernilla Wahlgren (Christine)
- Jan-Ove Waldner (Mackan)
- Sven Wollter (Andreas)

=== 12 October 2007 ===
Guest actor: Bert Karlsson
Music guest: Bodies Without Organs
Imitations:

- Maria Andersson (Josefine)
- Mathias Andersson (Peter)
- Jennie Asplund (Ulrika)
- Johanna Asplund (Christine)
- Carl Bildt (Peter)
- Johannes Brost (Mackan)
- Thomas Di Leva (Andreas)
- Peppe Eng (Mackan, David, Peter)
- Josephine Forsman (Andreas)
- Bert Karlsson (Peter)
- Maud Olofsson (David)
- Charlotte Perrelli (Christine)
- Suzanne Sjögren (Ulrika)
- Lill-Babs (David)
- Charlie Söderberg (David)
- Runar Søgaard (Andreas)
- Ulf Brunnberg som "Vanheden" (Mackan)

=== 19 October 2007 ===
Guest actor: Nanne Grönvall
Music guest: cirKus(with Neneh Cherry)
Imitations:

- Adam Alsing (Mackan)
- Lisa Ekdahl (Christine)
- Gry Forssell (Ulrika)
- Lars Lagerbäck
- Fredrik Lindström (Peter)
- Ulf Lundell (Mackan, Peter, Andreas)
- Renée Nyberg (David)
- Anders Timell (Peter)
- Martin Timell (Andreas)
- Mia Törnblom (Christine)

=== 26 October 2007 ===
Guest actor: Markoolio
Music guest: Katie Melua
Imitations:

=== 1 November 2007 ===
Guest actor: Johan Glans, Izabella Scorupco, Peter Jöback
Music guest: Peter Jöback
Imitations:

=== 8 November 2007 ===
Guest actor: Claes af Geijerstam
Music guest: Dogge Doggelito
Imitations:

=== 15 November 2007 ===
Guest actor: Gudrun Schyman
Music guest: Martin Stenmarck
Imitations:

=== 22 November 2007 ===
Guest actor: Rafael Edholm, Westlife
Music guest: Westlife
Imitations:

=== 29 November 2007 ===
Guest actor: Martin Timell
Music guest: The Temptations
Imitations:

=== 7 December 2007 ===
Guest actor: Jan Guillou
Music guest: Josh Groban
Imitations:
