= Visit to Vienna =

Single by Sahara Hotnights

from the album What If Leaving Is a Loving Thing
- Released: August 20, 2007
- Recorded: Atlantis Studio and Decibel Studios, Stockholm, Sweden
- Genre: indie rock
- Length: 3:53
- Songwriters: Maria Andersson, Josephine Forsman
- Producers: Björn Yttling, Sahara Hotnights

Sahara Hotnights singles chronology
"Cheek to Cheek" (2007)	"Visit to Vienna" (2007)	"The Loneliest City of All" (2008)

"Visit to Vienna" is a song recorded by Sahara Hotnights on their 2007 studio album What If Leaving Is a Loving Thing (2007). Released as the second single from the album, it peaked at 49th position at the Swedish singles chart. The song was written by bandmembers Maria Andersson and Josephine Forsman, and was produced while collaboration with Björn Yttling.

The song charted at Trackslistan for 17 weeks between 25 August – 15 December 2007, peaking at second position. Also charting at Svensktoppen it stayed there for 31 weeks between 2 September 2007 – 30 March 2008, peaking at 4th position before leaving chart.

The band also performed the song during the 2008 Grammis Awards Ceremony. The following up music video was directed by Magnus Renfors.

== Contributors ==
Sahara Hotnights

- Maria Andersson – vocals, guitar
- Jennie Asplund – guitar
- Johanna Asplund – bass
- Josephine Forsman – drums

Productions

- Janne Hansson – sound engineer
- Henrik Jonsson – mastering
- Lasse Mårtén – sound engineer, sound mix
- Sahara Hotnights – producer
- Björn Yttling – producer, sound engineer, sound mix

== Charts ==
Chart (2007–2008)	Peak position
Svensktoppen	4
Sverigetopplistan	49
Trackslistan	2
