= C'mon Let's Pretend =

Studio album by Sahara Hotnights
- Released: 1999; April 8, 2003 (re-issue)
- Genre: Rock
- Length: 41:34
- Label: Jetset

Sahara Hotnights chronology
Suits Anyone Fine (1997)	C'mon Let's Pretend (1999)	Jennie Bomb (2001)

C'mon Let's Pretend is the debut studio album by the Swedish rock group Sahara Hotnights. It was released in 1999. The album received two Grammi nominations.

== Reception ==
Professional ratings
Aggregate scores
Source	Rating
Metacritic	76/100
Review scores
Source	Rating
AllMusic	4/5 stars
Pitchfork Media	6.8/10

Matt Moore of the Associated Press described C'mon Let's Pretend as sounding like "an updated version of the Runaways with a healthy dose of in-your-face pop hooks".

== Track listing ==
1. "Push On Some More" – 3:34
2. "Quite a Feeling" – 3:44
3. "Drive Dead Slow" – 3:40
4. "Oh Darling!" – 3:37
5. "Wake Up" – 3:31
6. "That's What They Do" – 4:36
7. "Impressed by Me" – 2:48
8. "Kicks" – 3:28
9. "Too Cold for You" – 2:41
10. "I Know Exactly What to Do" – 4:48
11. "Our Very Own" – 5:07

== Personnel ==
Sahara Hotnights

- Maria Andersson – vocals, guitar
- Jennie Asplund – guitar
- Johanna Asplund – bass
- Josephine Forsman – drums

Production

- Björn Engelmann – mastering
- Hansi Friberg – manager
- Jonas Linell – photography
- Kjell Nästén – producer, sound engineer
- Nina Ramsby – design
- Sahara Hotnights – producer

== Charts ==
Chart (1999–2000)	Highest position
Sweden (Sverigetopplistan)	15
