= What If Leaving Is a Loving Thing =

Studio album by Sahara Hotnights
- Released: 18 April 2007
- Recorded: Atlantis Studios, Decibel Studios, Stockholm, Sweden
- Genre: Garage rock, indie rock
- Length: 36:50
- Label: Stand By Your Band
- Producer: Björn Yttling

Sahara Hotnights chronology
Kiss & Tell (2004)	What If Leaving Is a Loving Thing (2007)	Sparks (2009)

Professional ratings
Review scores
Source	Rating
AllMusic	3.5/5 stars

What If Leaving Is a Loving Thing is the fourth studio album by Swedish band Sahara Hotnights, released through their own record company Stand By Your Band.

== Track listing ==
All songs written by Maria Andersson and Josephine Forsman.

1. "Visit to Vienna" – 3:53
2. "The Loneliest City of All" – 3:43
3. "Salty Lips" – 3:25
4. "Neon Lights" – 3:55
5. "No for an Answer" – 4:41
6. "Cheek to Cheek" – 3:17
7. "Getting Away with Murder" – 4:21
8. "Puppy" – 3:13
9. "Static" – 4:14
10. "If Anyone Matters It's You" – 2:48

== Personnel ==
- Maria Andersson – Lead vocals, guitar
- Jennie Asplund – guitar, backing vocals
- Johanna Asplund – bass, backing vocals
- Josephine Forsman – Drums

== Charts ==
=== Weekly charts ===
Chart (2007–2008)	Peak position
Swedish Albums (Sverigetopplistan)	2

=== Year-end charts ===
Chart (2007)	Position
Swedish Albums (Sverigetopplistan)	15
Chart (2008)	Position
Swedish Albums (Sverigetopplistan)	100
