= Soran Ismail =

Swedish comedian (born 1987)

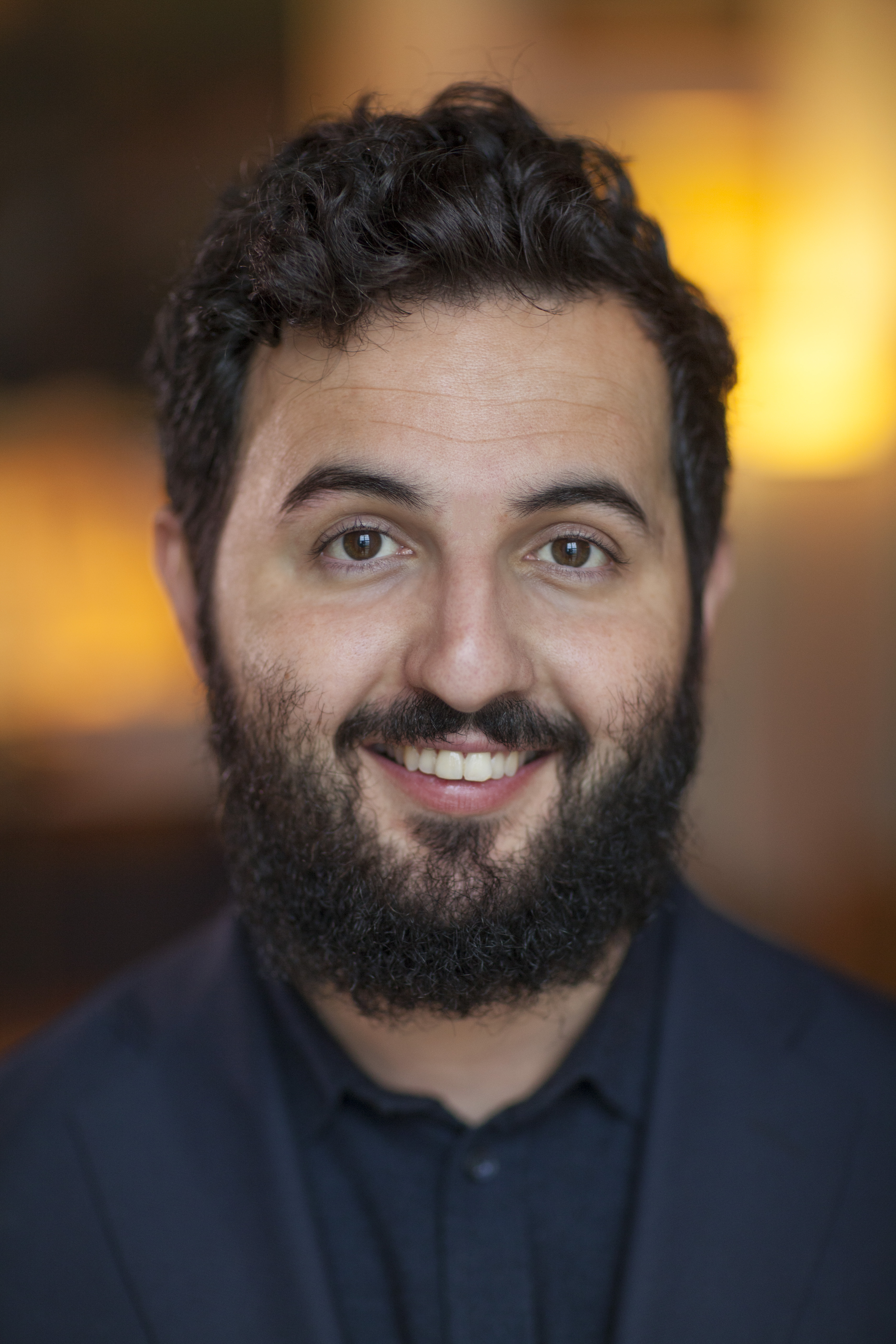
Soran Ismail in November 2016

Soran Ismail (born December 3, 1987, in Iran), is a Swedish Kurdish comedian, TV personality and author of Kurdish descent who as an immigrant grew up in Knivsta, Uppsala County and lived most of his life in Sweden. He is well known for his participation in several TV and radio shows with a humour profile and has toured Sweden together with Magnus Betnér with a show called En skam för Sverige (A Shame for Sweden). His various television projects include the documentary Absolut svensk (Absolutely Swedish) where he examines ethnic identity and every day racism in Sweden. This is also the title of his book released in 2017 (Absolut svensk : en ID-handling).

== Iron pipe scandal ==
One late night in 2010, Ismail was filmed by Kent Ekeroth when arguing in the street with Ekeroth and two other high-profile members of the Sweden Democrats in an incident known as the iron pipe scandal. In November 2012, the video was leaked to the newspaper Expressen, and the video of the Sweden Democrats provoking Ismail caused such outrage that the latter (by then all members of the Swedish parliament) were forced to resign from their positions in the party. Chief Prosecutor Mats Åhlund also initiated a preliminary investigation concerning racial agitation charges.

== Sexual harassment claims ==
In April 2021, an SVT documentary named Persona Non Grata, meant to rehabilitate Ismail's image after he was accused in the height of the Swedish #MeToo movement of multiple accounts of sexual assault and rape in 2017, was criticized by victims and journalists.

== Private life ==
Soran Ismail has a daughter (born 2014) with a woman he has separated from. In Sweden he is a high-profile Liverpool football club supporter.

== Bibliography ==
- Absolut svensk : en ID-handling (2017), ISBN 9789146233787

== TV and radio ==
- Parlamentet - 2007, 2008, 2009, 2010
- Extra! Extra! - 2008
- Reklam för Nollrasismveckan på TV4 - 2008
- Fredag hela veckan - 2008
- Pryo-elev på Vinnare V75 live - Sommar/Höst 2009
- Roast på Berns 2009
- Raw Comedy Club 2009
- VAKNA! med The Voice 2008
- Morgonpasset 2010
- Musikhjälpen 2010
- Gustafsson 3 tr 2011
- Sommar i P1 2012
- Vinter i P1 2012
- Persona Non Grata 2021 - Sveriges Television
