= Kiss & Tell (Sahara Hotnights album) =

Studio album by Sahara Hotnights
- Released: July 27, 2004
- Recorded: Stockholm, Sweden
- Genre: Indie rock, garage rock
- Length: 34:51
- Label: RCA
- Producer: Pelle Gunnerfeldt

Sahara Hotnights chronology
Jennie Bomb (2001)	Kiss & Tell (2004)	What If Leaving Is a Loving Thing (2007)

Professional ratings
Aggregate scores
Source	Rating
Metacritic	65/100
Review scores
Source	Rating
AllMusic	3.5/5 stars
Pitchfork Media	8.1/10
Rolling Stone	3/5 stars

Kiss & Tell is the third studio album by the Swedish rock band Sahara Hotnights.

== Media appearances ==
The song "Hot Night Crash" was featured in the video games Burnout 3: Takedown and Tony Hawk's Downhill Jam.

The song "Walk on the Wire" was featured in the What's New, Scooby-Doo? episode, "A Scooby-Doo Valentine".

== Track listing ==
All songs written by Maria Andersson and Josephine Forsman.

1. "Who Do You Dance For?" – 2:19
2. "Hot Night Crash" – 2:41
3. "Empty Heart" – 2:54
4. "Walk on the Wire" – 2:54
5. "Mind over Matter" – 3:17
6. "Stupid Tricks" – 3:51
7. "Nerves" – 3:08
8. "Stay/Stay Away" – 2:58
9. "Keep Calling My Baby" – 3:29
10. "The Difference Between Love and Hell" – 4:01
11. "Hangin'" – 3:19

=== B-sides ===
B-side	Availability
"The Dogs Don't Want You" - 2:58	Kiss & Tell [Japan], Who Do You Dance For? [Single]
"Model A" - 2:51	Kiss & Tell [Japan], Hot Night Crash [Single]

== Personnel ==
- Maria Andersson – lead vocals, guitar
- Jennie Asplund – guitar, backing vocals
- Johanna Asplund – bass, backing vocals
- Josephine Forsman – drums
