= A Midsummer Night's Party =

- Directed by: Staffan Lindberg
- Screenplay by: Peter Magnusson
- Produced by: Lena Rehnberg
- Starring: Peter Magnusson
- Cinematography: Henrik Gyllenskiöld
- Release date: 31 July 2009 (Sweden)
- Running time: 97 minutes
- Country: Sweden
- Language: Swedish

A Midsummer Night's Party (Swedish: Sommaren med Göran – En midsommarnattskomedi, literally "The Summer with Göran – A Midsummer-Night's Comedy) is a Swedish film which was released to cinemas in Sweden on 31 July 2009, directed by Staffan Lindberg.

== Cast ==
- Peter Magnusson as Göran
- David Hellenius as Alex
- Mirja Turestedt as Grynet
- Moa Gammel as Linnea
- Alexandra Rapaport as Sofia
- Peter Dalle as Hans Kjällén
- Christine Meltzer as Elin
- Tanja Lorentzon as Anne
- Dan Ekborg as Greger Bengtzon
- Ruth Vega Fernandez as Mikaela
- Niklas Engdahl as Dodde
- Carl Stjernlöf as Niklas
- Lisbeth Johansson as a nurse
