= Samhällsnytt =

Swedish right-wing news website

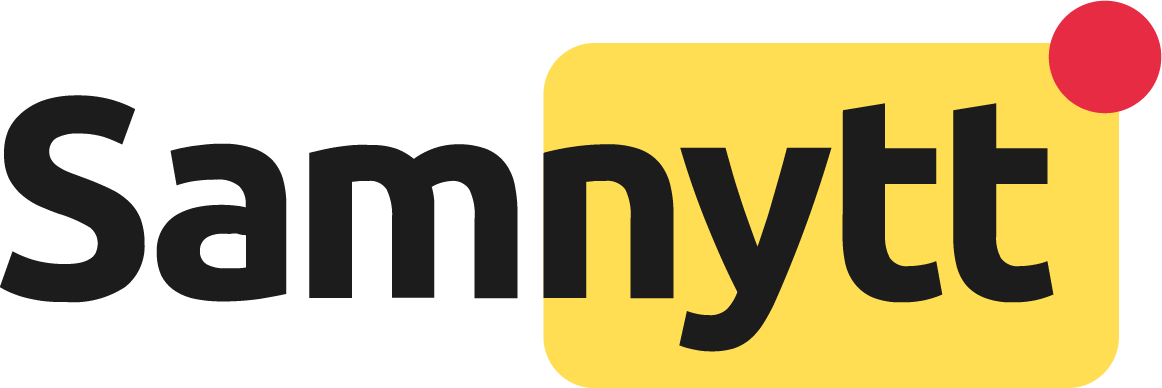
- Website type: News website
- Available in: Swedish
- Editor: Mats Dagerlind
- Website: samnytt.se
- Launched: 30 August 2017

Samhällsnytt (Society News) or Samnytt is a Swedish right-wing populist online news website founded in 2017. Oxford University's Internet Institute's Project on Computational Propaganda identified Samhällsnytt as one of the three primary "junk news" sources in Sweden, alongside Nyheter Idag and Fria Tider.

== History and activities ==
The site and its predecessors is said to have made an impact due to their "relentless reporting on immigrant crime". Samhällsnytt is the successor to the news website Avpixlat ("De-pixelated"), also closely linked to Kent Ekeroth. Avpixlat was labeled a racist hate-site, xenophobic and right-wing extremist by Swedish and international media, while describing itself as "an independent Sweden-friendly website for news and opinions". The site leaned close to the counter-jihad movement and supported Israel. Avpixlat was itself the successor to the news site Politiskt Inkorrekt ("Politically Incorrect"), founded in 2008, which also had close ties to Ekeroth and the counter-jihad movement.

== Legal issues ==
- In October 2021, the editor of the website Mats Dagerlind was sentenced to 40 daily fines, SEK 30,000 in damages and SEK 115,000 in legal fees for libel against a journalist at Dagens Nyheter. The conviction concerned Dagerlind describing the journalist of Syrian descent as a "suspected jihadist" with ties to the al-Nusra Front and al-Qaeda.
- In February 2024, Dagerlind was again convicted for two counts of libel and one count of aggravated libel, for a series of articles that accused a person of being reprehensible and criminal. He was sentenced to one month in prison and SEK 20,000 in damages.
- Samhällsnytt has also been sued multiple times for libel and theft of copyrighted material.
- At least one writer for Samhällsnytt was denied parliamentary press accreditation after being deemed a security risk due to ties to Russian intelligence, according to the Swedish Security Service.
- Samhällsnytt has been routinely criticised for unethical publications by Mediernas Etiknämnd.
