= Robertsfors =

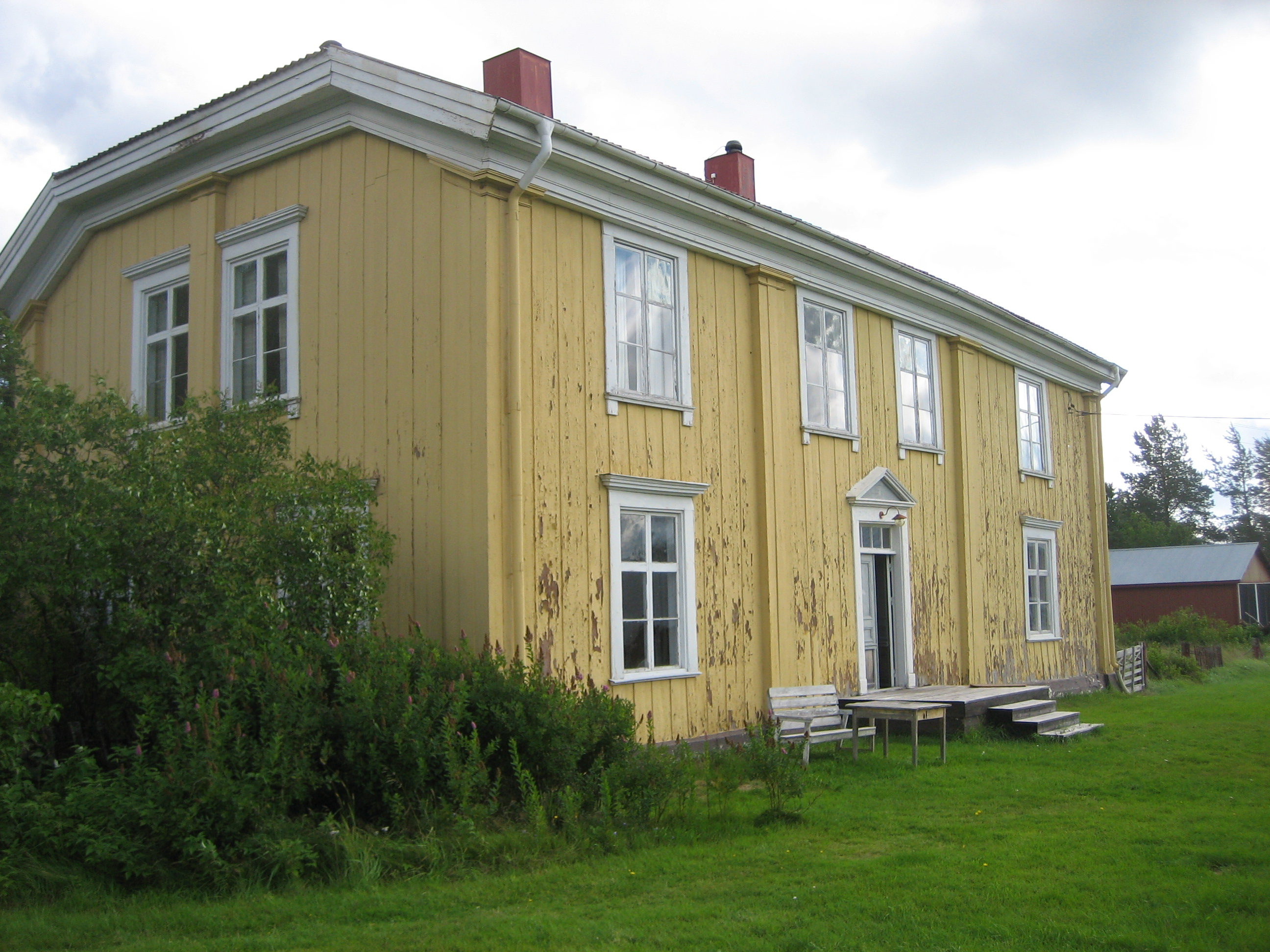
- Thurdinska gården in Robertsfors

- Location within Västerbotten Location within Sweden
- Coordinates: 64°12′N 20°51′E
- Country: Sweden
- Province: Västerbotten
- County: Västerbotten County
- Municipality: Robertsfors Municipality

Area
  - Total: 2.15 km^{2} (0.83 sq mi)

Population (31 December 2010)
  - Total: 2,004
  - Density: 931/km^{2} (2,410/sq mi)
- Time zone: UTC+1 (CET)
  - Summer (DST): UTC+2 (CEST)

Robertsfors is a locality and the seat of Robertsfors Municipality in Västerbotten County, Sweden with 2,004 inhabitants in 2010.

Robertsfors is named after the Scotsman Robert Finlay, who, together with John Jennings, founded an ironworks there in 1751.

== Well known people from Robertsfors ==
- Maria Andersson, musician, member of Sahara Hotnights
- Josephine Forsman, musician, member of Sahara Hotnights and Casablanca
- Jennie Asplund, musician, member of Sahara Hotnights
- Johanna Asplund, musician, member of Sahara Hotnights
- Frida Hyvönen, musician
- Jennifer Granholm, second-generation descendant of Swedish Canadian emigrants from Robertsfors, where her great-grandfather was mayor
