= Sparks (Sahara Hotnights album) =

Studio album by Sahara Hotnights
- Released: 25 February 2009
- Genre: Indie rock
- Length: 36:31
- Label: Stand by Your Band
- Producer: Björn Yttling

Sahara Hotnights chronology
What If Leaving Is a Loving Thing (2007)	Sparks (2009)	Sahara Hotnights (2011)

Professional ratings
Review scores
Source	Rating
AllMusic	3.5/5 stars

Sparks is the fifth studio album by Swedish band Sahara Hotnights, released on 25 February 2009 through their own record company Stand By Your Band. The album consists of covers of songs by artists such as Foo Fighters, Cass McCombs, Dusty Springfield, and Aneka.

== Track listing ==
1. "Wide River" (Chris McCarty, Steve Miller) – 2:27
2. "In Private" (Dusty Springfield) – 3:41
3. "Big Me" (Foo Fighters) – 3:58
4. "Mess Around" (Redd Kross) – 3:20
5. "Japanese Boy" (Aneka) – 3:44
6. "City of Brotherly Love" (Cass McCombs) – 6:09
7. "Calm Down" (Birdy) – 3:19
8. "Love Will Never Do (Without You)" (Janet Jackson) - 3:33
9. "If You Can't Give Me Love" (Suzi Quatro) – 2:56
10. "Be Forewarned" (Pentagram) – 3:24

== Personnel ==
- Maria Andersson – Lead vocals, guitar
- Jennie Asplund – guitar, backing vocals
- Johanna Asplund – bass, backing vocals
- Josephine Forsman – Drums
