= Bytt är bytt =

- Genre: Game show
- Presented by: Renée Nyberg
- Starring: Karin Laserow (2014-2020); Li Pamp (2020–present)
- Country of origin: Sweden
- Original language: Swedish

Production
- Running time: 45 minutes (inc. adverts)
- Production company: Mastiff

Original release
- Network: TV4
- Release: September 25, 2014 – present

Bytt är bytt is a Swedish game show broadcast on TV4. The first season started airing on 25 September 2014. The show is presented by Renée Nyberg and the antiques expert was initially Karin Laserow. The show is a Swedish TV-concept. From autumn 2020, Li Pamp replaced Karin Laserow.

== Gameplay ==
The game show consists of a couple being surrounded by eight antique objects, which are owned and brought by each Swedish volunteer and are each worth SEK 500, SEK 5 000, SEK 10 000, SEK 25 000, SEK 50 000, SEK 100 000, SEK 250 000 and SEK 500 000. The couple must then choose the object they think is worth the most. Each round begins with the competing pair choosing the item they believe is the highest valued and the item they believe is the lowest valued. The expert tells about the objects and the couple must then choose which object they want to send out of the game. Then, in random order, the pair selects the remaining items, one at a time, as presented by the expert, then decides each time whether to send out the most recently selected item or the previously selected item. When there is finally only one item left in the game, the pair wins the amount that item is worth.

== International versions ==
The TV format was exported with the international title Trash or Treasure.

Country	Name	Presenter	Channel	Broadcast
Denmark	Skat eller skrammel	Sisse Fisker	DR1	May 19, 2015 – 2015
Germany	Kitsch oder Kasse	Oliver Geissen	RTL	February 10, 2020 – October 20, 2020
Netherlands	Kitsch of Kassa	Jochem van Gelder	SBS6	March 25, 2015 – May 17, 2015
Italy	Tanto vale	Costantino della Gherardesca	Deejay TV	December 6, 2015 – January 24, 2016
Spain	Basura o Tesoro	Iñaki Urrutia	Aragón TV	November 6, 2022 – present
Spain	Tresor o Trasto	Eugeni Alemany	À Punt	January 5, 2023 – March 31, 2023
Spain	Lixo ou Tesouro	María Mera	TVG	October 17, 2023 – January 5, 2024
Spain	Tesoro o cacharro	Iñaki López	La Sexta	September 9, 2025 – October 28, 2025
