= Gunnar Sandelin =

Swedish social worker, author, lecturer and journalist

- Born: 1951 (age 74–75)
- Occupations: Social worker and journalist

Gunnar Sandelin (born March 14, 1951) is a Swedish social worker, author, lecturer, and journalist. He has worked for Sveriges Television and been the press manager at Barnens rätt i samhället. Sandelin has stated that mainstream media reporters avoid writing the truth about the consequences of Sweden's migration policy due to fear of reprisals. Together with Karl-Olov Arnstberg, he has written the book Invandring och mörkläggning and a sequel. Sandelin has been a debater at Nya Tider.

== Politics ==
Gunnar Sandelin published his first article criticizing the nature of Swedish migration policy in 2008 in Dagens Nyheter.

Sandelin has published five articles in the Swedish newspaper Dagens Samhälle with content relating to the irresponsible migration policy of Sweden. Göteborgsposten published an article on Sandelin saying that "it is time to change course in the question of asylum immigration." On May 5, 2019, Sandelin published an article in Det Goda Samhället where he writes of how Jan Guillou published two articles denoting Sandelin as "xenophobic". Nya Tider published an article written by Sandelin where he states that 500,000 migrants are expected to arrive in Sweden between 2017 and 2021. In an article by Norwegian newspaper Samtiden, Sandelin warned of an increase in crime due to the migration of young men from violent regions with a failed state. In 2011, Aftonbladet published an article where Sandelin reported that he had been denied a job at Statistiska Centralbyrån (Sweden's Statistics Agency) because he had the "wrong opinion". Sandelin reported the agency to the Justitiekanslern (Chancellor of Justice) for a violation of freedom of speech. The report was denied. In 2013, Dagens Nyheter published a marketing article about Sandelin's book Invandring och mörkläggning where it was criticized as being racist by Alexandra Pascalidou and state researcher Ulf Bjereld. Peter Woldoraski, editor in chief of Dagens Nyheter at the time, stated that he had done fact-checking before publication. On November 2, 2018, Svensk Webbtelevision released a video interview with Sandelin where he spoke of the total amount of Sweden's asylum seekers and whether it follows the United Nations minimum. In 2013, he published an article on Swedish news site Newsmill where he stated that Sweden does not have the capacity to handle its current level of migration. According to Ivar Arpi at Svenska Dagbladet, Sandelins books ended up on the leader charts after publication. He has also warned of the demographic changes in Sweden and the increasing rates of crime committed by young migrants, often men, from countries around the Middle East. On March 7, 2014, Fria Tider published an article about Sandelin's statement that journalists are terrified of losing their jobs if they were to criticize the migration policy.

He has held speeches together with the Tryckfrihetssällskapet (Society for Freedom of the Press).

== Bibliography ==
- Nut shell: Swedish immigration policy and its consequences
- Immigration and Cover-Up II: Depressions and Explanations

== See also ==
- Islamophobia in Sweden
- Opposition to immigration
