= Robertsfors Municipality =

Robertsfors Municipality Robertsfors kommun
- Municipality
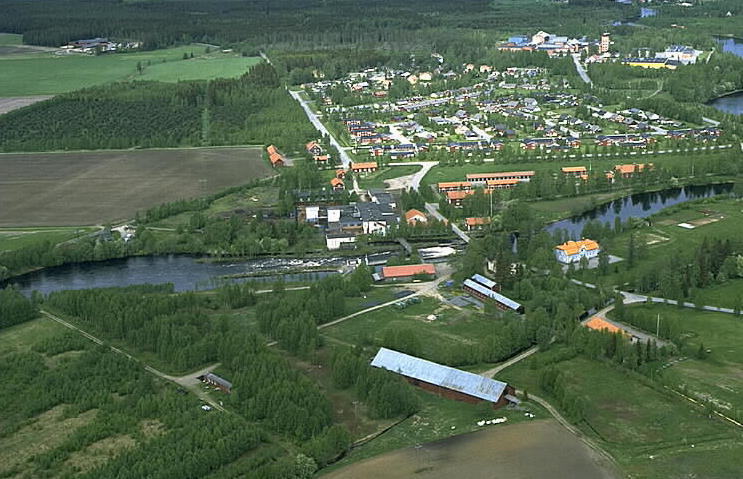

- Coat of arms

- Coordinates: 64°12′N 20°51′E
- Country: Sweden
- County: Västerbotten County
- Seat: Robertsfors

Area
  - Total: 2,369.65 km^{2} (914.93 sq mi)
  - Land: 1,292.21 km^{2} (498.93 sq mi)
  - Water: 1,077.44 km^{2} (416.00 sq mi)
- Area as of 1 January 2014.

Population (30 June 2025)
  - Total: 6,652
  - Density: 5.148/km^{2} (13.33/sq mi)
- Time zone: UTC+1 (CET)
  - Summer (DST): UTC+2 (CEST)
- ISO 3166 code: SE
- Province: Västerbotten
- Municipal code: 2409
- Website: www.robertsfors.se

Robertsfors Municipality (Swedish: Robertsfors kommun) is a municipality in Västerbotten County in northern Sweden. Its seat is located in Robertsfors.

== History ==
In 1759 the small village Edfastmark became Robertsfors Bruk. It was the Irishman John Jennings and his brother-in-law, the Scotsman Robert Finlay, who founded the new ironworks which also got its name, Robertsfors, from Robert Finlay.

== Localities ==
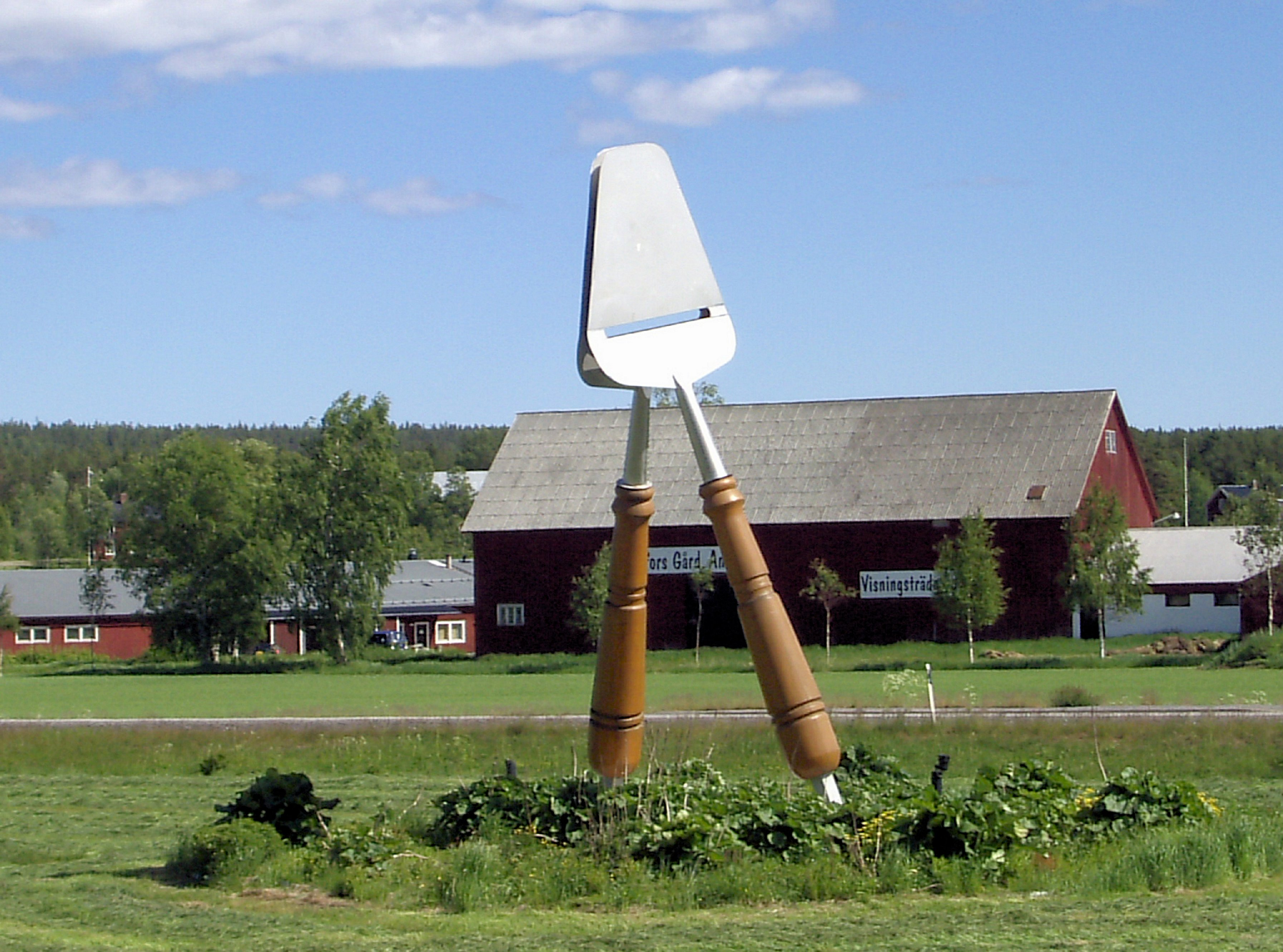
The world's largest cheese slicer in Ånäset.

There are three localities (or urban areas) in Robertsfors Municipality:

#	Locality	Population
1	**Robertsfors**	2,010
2	Ånäset	622
3	Bygdeå	506

The municipal seat in bold

== Demographics ==
This is a demographic table based on Robertsfors Municipality's electoral districts in the 2022 Swedish general election sourced from SVT's election platform, in turn taken from SCB official statistics.

In total there were 6,781 residents, including 5,172 Swedish citizens of voting age. 63.1% voted for the left coalition and 35.7% for the right coalition. Indicators are in percentage points except population totals and income.

Location	Residents	Citizen adults	Left vote	Right vote	Employed	Swedish parents	Foreign heritage	Income SEK	Degree
Location			%	%					
Bygdeå	1,968	1,500	65.1	33.9	87	92	8	27,037	41
Nysätra-Ånäset	1,529	1,230	58.6	39.2	82	92	8	23,183	26
Robertsfors	2,514	1,861	66.2	33.1	81	84	16	22,532	28
Överklinten	770	581	60.2	39.0	88	90	10	25,496	30
Source: SVT

== Notable natives ==
- Carl Olof Rosenius, revivalist preacher
- Frida Hyvönen, artist
- Maud Olofsson, politician
- Sahara Hotnights, rock group
