= Jennie Bomb =

Studio album by Sahara Hotnights
- Released: June 2001 (worldwide); 2002 (US)
- Genre: Rock
- Length: 40:12
- Label: RCA Records
- Producer: Chips K with Sahara Hotnights

Sahara Hotnights chronology
C'mon Let's Pretend (1999)	Jennie Bomb (2001)	Kiss & Tell (2004)

Professional ratings
Review scores
Source	Rating
AllMusic	4/5 stars
Pitchfork Media	7.3/10
The Daily Vault	A

Jennie Bomb is the second album from the all-girl Swedish rock band, Sahara Hotnights. It was released in 2001 by RCA Records and BMG, with a 2002 release in the USA by Jetset Records. The album is named after band member Jennie Asplund.

The tracks, "Alright Alright (Here's My Fist Where's The Fight?)", "On Top of Your World", and "With Or Without Control" were released as singles.

== Track listing ==
=== Swedish release ===
All songs written by Maria Andersson and Josephine Forsman.

1. Alright Alright (Here's My Fist Where's the Fight) – 2:07
2. On Top of Your World – 3:16
3. Fire Alarm – 3:08
4. With or Without Control – 3:34
5. Keep Up the Speed – 3:07
6. No Big Deal – 1:55
7. Down and Out – 2:40
8. Only the Fakes Survive – 3:42
9. Whirlwind Reaper – 3:37
10. Fall into Line – 3:28
11. Are You Happy Now? – 2:33
12. Out of the System – 2:39
13. A Perfect Mess – 4:26

=== British release ===
The British release drops the 13th track, "A Perfect Mess".

=== US release ===
The US release drops "Whirlwind Reaper" "Are You Happy Now?" and "A Perfect Mess", and adds "We're Not Going Down". The track order is also changed, as follows:

1. "Alright Alright (Here's My Fist Where's the Fight?)"
2. "Keep Up the Speed"
3. "On Top of Your World"
4. "Fire Alarm"
5. "No Big Deal"
6. "With or Without Control"
7. "Down and Out"
8. "Only the Fakes Survive"
9. "Fall into Line"
10. "We're Not Going Down"
11. "Out of the System"

=== Deluxe version ===
The deluxe version comprises the US version of the album on disc one, and 4 bonus tracks on disc two.

==== Disc one ====
- Same as US track listing, above.

==== Disc two ====
1. "Keep Up the Speed"
2. "Teenage Kicks"
3. "Breakdown"
4. "Now Tonight"

=== Australian Limited Edition ===
The Australian Limited Edition follows the US track listing for tracks 1–11, followed by 3 bonus tracks:

1. "Breakdown"
2. "Now Tonight"
3. "Are You Happy Now?"

== Personnel ==
- Maria Andersson – Lead vocals, guitar
- Jennie Asplund – guitar, backing vocals
- Johanna Asplund – bass, backing vocals
- Josephine Forsman – Drums

== Reception ==
Laura Haber of The Michigan Daily gave the album a poor review, stating "Jennie Bomb leaves you, like Sweden, rather cold." Ross White of Salon.com gave it a positive review, stating the album was "well-tested, recognizable rock" but also it was "not the be-all, end-all of rock ‘n’ roll". Chris Harlow of The Daily Vault have the album an "A".
