= Peter Magnusson =

Swedish actor, writer and comedian (born 1974)

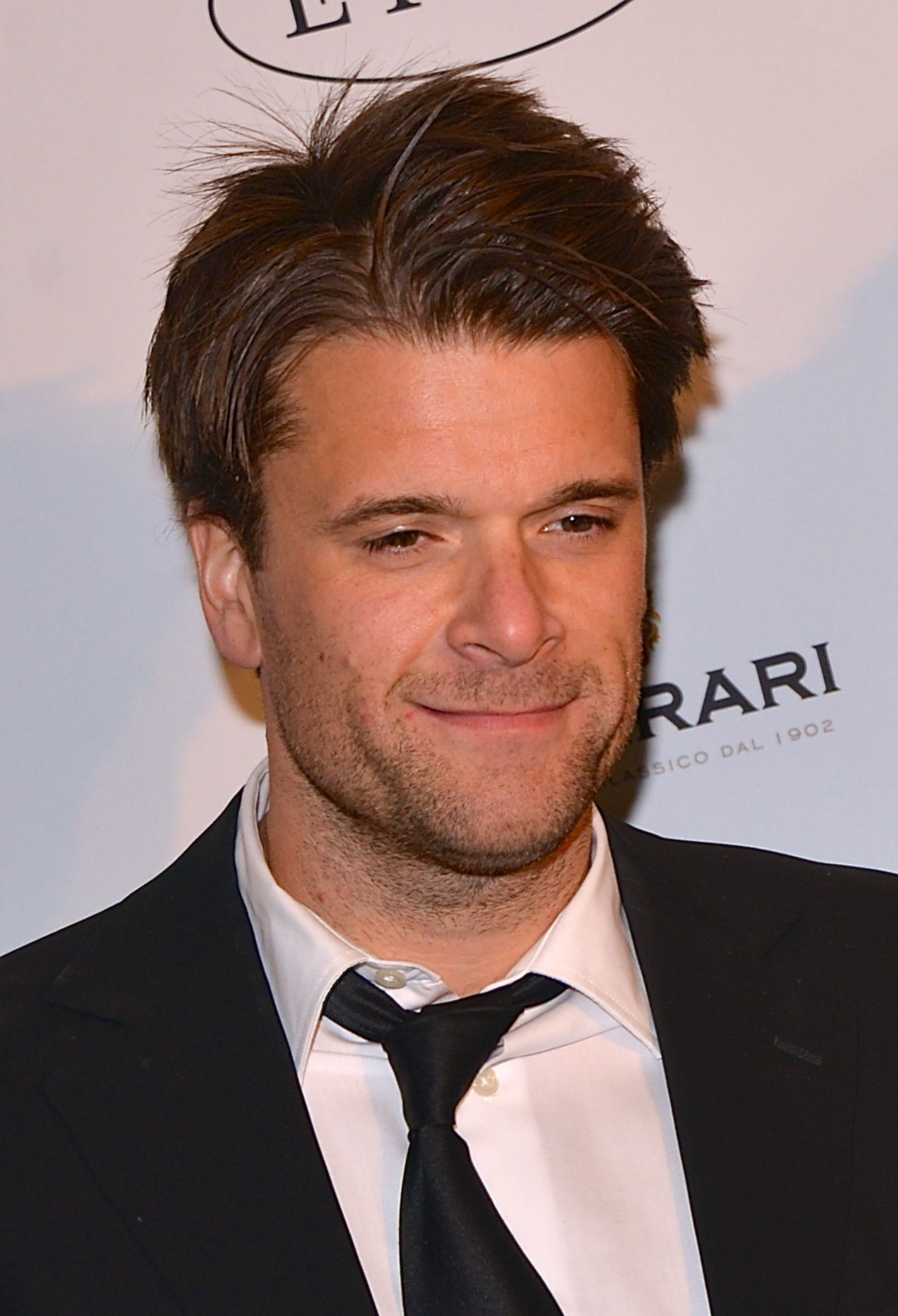
- Peter Magnusson (2013)
- Born: Charles Peter Magnusson; 9 December 1974 (age 51); Bromma, Stockholm, Sweden
- Occupations: Comedian, actor, writer
- Known for: Hey Baberiba, Idol 2004, Situation Magnusson, Fredag hela veckan, Blomstertid

Charles Peter Magnusson (born 9 December 1974) is a Swedish actor, writer and comedian.

== Career ==
Magnusson was the presenter of the first season of Idol 2004 in Sweden along with David Hellenius. Along with David Hellenius and Christine Meltzer he was also a member of a group of comedians who hosted the comedy sketch-show Hey Baberiba on TV4, in which they parodied Swedish celebrities.

He was the presenter of the comedy show Situation Magnusson, which was premiered on TV4 on 8 February 2007. Magnusson traveled around Europe in disguise, displaying bad and loud behaviour in front of unsuspecting people who were being filmed by a hidden camera. His most noted character was Mike Hunt, a reporter from Sky News in London.

Magnusson was also one of the regular hosts of Fredag Hela Veckan, a Swedish version of Saturday Night Live. In 2009 Magnusson appeared as the three main characters of the TV4 miniseries "Blomstertid": Kenneth, Steven and Anders.

Magnusson wrote and acted in the film A Midsummer Night’s Party in 2009 and Once Upon a Time in Phuket in 2012.

== Films ==
- A Midsummer Night's Party (2009)
- Once Upon a Time in Phuket (2012)
- Lasse-Majas detektivbyrå – von Broms hemlighet (2013)
- Tillbaka till Bromma (2014)
- 10 000 timmar (2014)
- Micke & Veronica (2014)
- I nöd eller lust (2015)

Sommaren med släkten, (2017 г.)

== TV shows ==
- Pyjamas, ZTV, 2001–2002
- Slussen, TV3, 2002
- Pass På (Be alert), ZTV, 2003
- Godafton Sverige (Good afternoon Sweden), TV3, 2003–2004
- Idol 2004, TV4, 2004
- Stadskampen (Cityfighters), TV4, 2005
- Lilla kycklingen (Chicken little), 2005, Swedish vocal
- Hey Baberiba, TV4, 2005–2006
- Situation Magnusson, TV4, 2007
- Fredag hela veckan (Friday all week), TV4, 2007-
- Hjälp! (Help!), 2008
- Blomstertid, 2009
- Stockholm-Båstad, 2011
