= Nyheter Idag =

Swedish-language online newspaper

- Front page of 5 September 2021.
- Type: Daily newspaper
- Format: Tabloid; Online newspaper
- Owner(s): Publicism NITEK AB (Chang Frick)
- Founder: Chang Frick
- Editor-in-chief: Chang Frick
- Editor: Pelle Zackrisson
- Founded: 2014; 12 years ago
- Language: Swedish
- Country: Sweden
- Website: nyheteridag.se

Nyheter Idag (News Today) is a Swedish-language online newspaper. The magazine was founded in February 2014 by Chang Frick and Jakob Bergman, and they say their news reports focus on "politics, gossip, social media and foreign news". The publication describes itself as based on libertarian principles, and the employees have a background in different organizations. Expo grouped Nyheter Idag with "right-wing populist and far-right alternative media", but also stated that it was the news site most difficult to fit into that mold. It has been labelled a racist site by some pundits.

== Trip to Russia ==
In October 2017, Nyheter Idag published an article titled "The Swedish diplomat". In the article, the journalist and founder of Nyheter Idag, Chang Frick wrote about his and Sweden Democrats MP Pavel Gamov's travel to Russia. Gamov was going to inspect the Moscow regional election 2017, despite being advised not to. Frick accused Gamov of acting irresponsibly by getting wasted, calling sex workers to his hotel room and demanding that the host country pay for his bar check. The subsequent media attention led the leadership of the Sweden Democrats party to force Pavel's resignation.

== Connections with Sweden Democrats ==
The site is Sweden Democrats friendly. When the Expressen newspaper was investigating the connections between the Sweden Democrats and online xenophobia they found that Nyheter Idag is one of the most important media channels for the Sweden Democrats. Internal mail conversations showed that the Sweden Democrats paid Nyheter Idag to publish negative news about the old leadership of Sweden Democratic Youth. In a private e-mail to Martin Kinnunen – then press secretary of the Sweden Democrats, Chang Frick wrote that the site was "positive" to the party and they would not try to harm it. The domain name for the site was originally registered by Kent Ekeroth, Member of Parliament for the Sweden Democrats. In an agreement signed between a photographer and Ekeroth, the photographer would deliver images during the 2014 election year to both Avpixlat and Nyheter Idag.

== Spread and trust ==
According to Reuters Institute for the Study of Journalism's Digital News Report 2018, the trustworthiness of Nyheter Idag was rated 5.01 out of 10 by the 27% of news readers who were aware of the site.
