= Bygdeå =

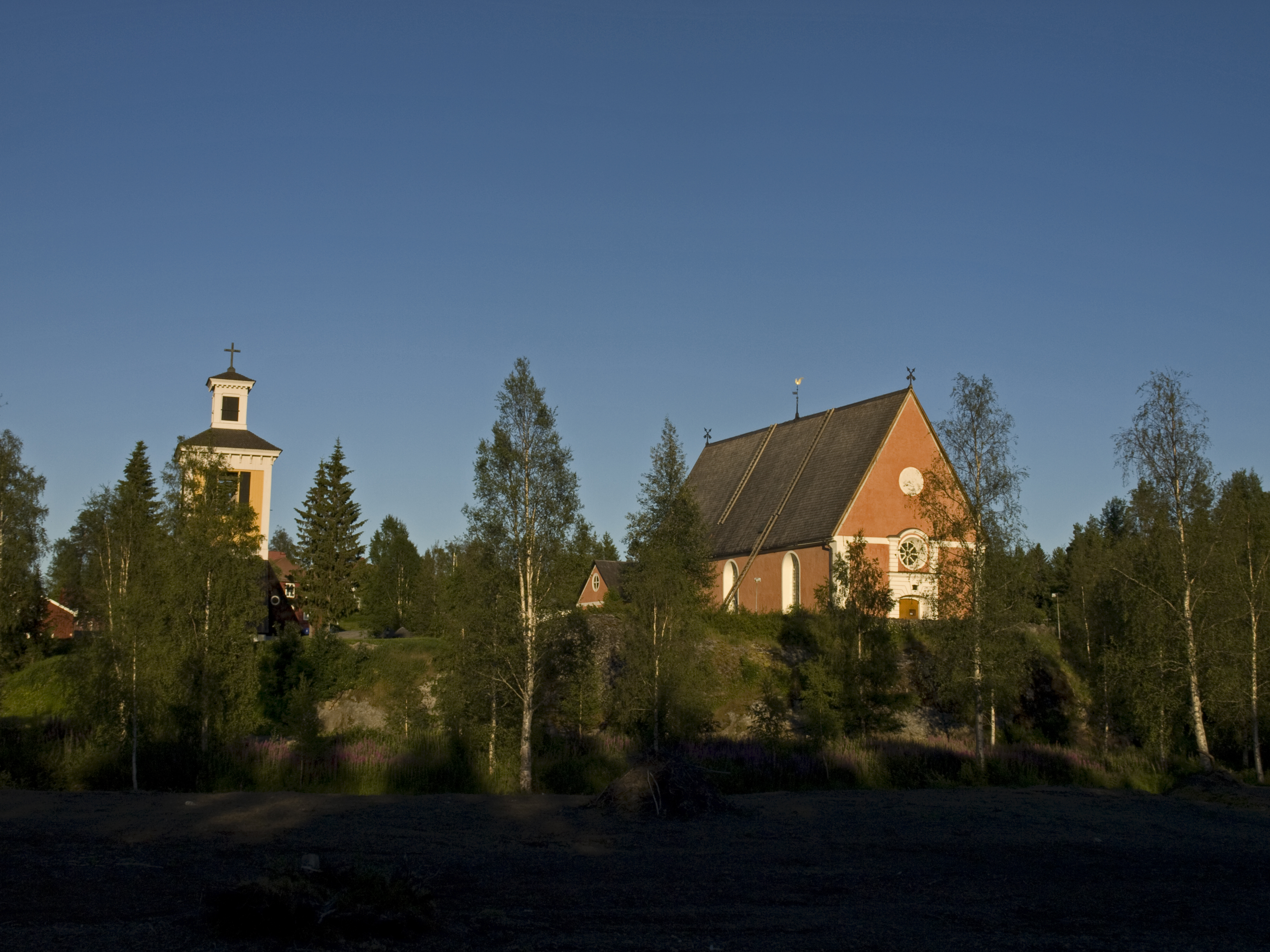
- Church ensemble in Bygdeå

- Location within Västerbotten Location within Sweden
- Coordinates: 64°04′N 20°51′E
- Country: Sweden
- Province: Västerbotten
- County: Västerbotten County
- Municipality: Robertsfors Municipality

Area
  - Total: 0.74 km^{2} (0.29 sq mi)

Population (31 December 2010)
  - Total: 502
  - Density: 681/km^{2} (1,760/sq mi)
- Time zone: UTC+1 (CET)
  - Summer (DST): UTC+2 (CEST)

Bygdeå is a locality situated in Robertsfors Municipality, Västerbotten County, Sweden with 487 inhabitants as of 2020.

The town is situated some 15 kilometres (9.3 mi) south of the municipal seat Robertsfors and several kilometers inland from the Swedish Kvarken of the Gulf of Bothnia. Transportations are reliable via the European route E4.

The town name is first traced from 1314, as the name of Bygdeå Court District.

== History ==
One of the last battles of Finnish War between Russia and Sweden (slaget vid Ratan) was fought south of Bygdeå in March 1809. In the churchyard, there is a replica of the funeral monument to a Russian officer, Semyon Gotovtsov, who was killed in combat.

== Culture and recreation ==
The Bygdeå Church was built in 1539 and is located next to the Storbäcken Stream. It is one of the oldest Churches in Norrbotten.
