= North Beach Village =

Neighborhood in Fort Lauderdale, Florida

Coordinates: 26.131°N 80.106°W

North Beach Village is a neighborhood of mid-century hotels and garden apartments located in Fort Lauderdale, Florida. Initially developed after World War II, the neighborhood experienced a period of decline beginning in the 1970s. In recent years, large-scale demolition and redevelopment have emphasized high-rise condominiums and hotels, transforming the area's landscape and character.

== History ==
The neighborhood's development was significantly influenced by the post-World War II era, which saw a rise in automobile travel and the subsequent need for wide roads and ample parking spaces. This led to the construction of many small motels and resorts, which became iconic landmarks in the 1950s and 1960s.

In the 1940s, the land that now comprises North Beach Village was owned by Hugh Taylor Birch. Upon his death, Birch bequeathed the land to his alma mater, Antioch College. Although there were initial plans to develop the area into estate homes, the land's potential as a tourist destination proved more economically viable. As a result, the neighborhood blossomed into a tropical retreat, attracting numerous visitors and investors.

The area experienced a decline in the latter part of the 20th century. The decrease in spring break tourism and the decline of motor tourists led to many motels falling into disrepair. The neighborhood suffered further during the recession, with many properties being abandoned and left dilapidated.

In 2008, during the economic recession, Swedish entrepreneur Pär Olof Sandå purchased over 30 deteriorating properties in North Beach Village, just a block away from the beach. Sanda envisioned transforming the area into a European-style village with plazas, bistros, and communal spaces. Over the years, Sanda invested $100 million in renovating and developing North Beach Village.

The redevelopment project involved the restoration of Mid-century Modern architecture with contemporary interiors. Fifteen boutique hotels were renovated within a 1.5-mile radius, including the flagship North Beach Hotel, AQUA Hotel, Tranquilo Hotel, and the newly finished Flow Hotel. The properties feature a blend of mid-century modern designs and pop art installations, creating a unique aesthetic.

Some notable landmarks in the neighborhood include The Royal Scot, built in 1937, and the Birch Tower, a condominium designed by architect Charles McKirahan in the late 1950s. and Birch House apartment building, constructed in 1959.
