= Bjärred =

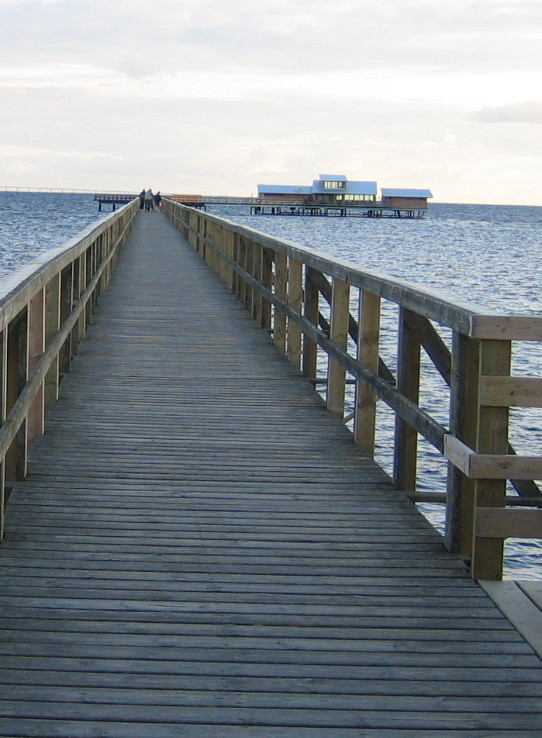
- The long jetty in Bjärred

- Location within Skåne Location within Sweden
- Coordinates: 55°43′N 13°01′E
- Country: Sweden
- Province: Skåne
- County: Skåne County
- Municipality: Lomma Municipality

Area
  - Total: 4.79 km^{2} (1.85 sq mi)

Population (31 December 2010)
  - Total: 9,542
  - Density: 1,992/km^{2} (5,160/sq mi)
- Time zone: UTC+1 (CET)
  - Summer (DST): UTC+2 (CEST)

Bjärred (Swedish: [ˈbjæ̌rːɛd], outdatedly [ˈbjěːrɛd]) is a coastal locality situated in Lomma Municipality, Skåne County, Sweden. It is situated about 20 km north of Malmö, 10 km west of Lund and 5 km north of Lomma village. With 9,874 inhabitants in 2016, it is the second largest locality in Lomma Municipality and accounts for around 41% of its inhabitants. Bjärred largely serves as a suburb of Malmö and Lund.

Among the sights in the town is the open-air swimming-baths, situated 500 meters out on the jetty Långa bryggan.

== History ==
The name Bjärred is thought to come from the Danish word bjerg, which means height or hill, and may refer to the height at which the settlement appears when viewed from the sea.

The town grew up as a seaside resort for the nearby city of Lund during the 1800s. The construction of an 11-km long railway between Lund and Bjärred began in 1899, and the railway opened for traffic on July 27, 1901. The railway was electrified in 1916, however, it did not prove commercially successful and closed on June 15, 1939, with the rails being removed in 1940.

The population of Bjärred has grown strongly since the mid-1900s, from 864 residents in 1960 to 9,874 residents in 2010.

== Geography ==
The settlement can be divided into four areas: Löddesnäs in the north-west, Borgeby in the north, Centrum in the central part of the town and Gamla Bjärred and Haboljung in the south. A large yard named Bjerehof within the settlement has given its name to the eponymous dwelling area in central Bjärred, along with a school and sports hall. What is now the central part of Bjärred was formally Högsäters orchard, founded by Eric Jungquist in the beginning of the 1920s.

Along the beach in Löddesnäs in north Bjärred there is a nature reserve whose main feature is the 10–15 m high wall, Littorinavallen, which runs parallel to the beach. Above the wall in an meadow named Gyllins meadow, after the owner of a large part of Bjärred in the 1900s. The river Lödde å runs into the Öresund north of Bjärred, where there is also a bird-watching tower.

The village has a shallow beach on the Öresund, with bathing jetty which, at 524 m, is one of the longest in Sweden. During 2004 an outdoor baths opened at the end of the jetty, which also houses a restaurant.

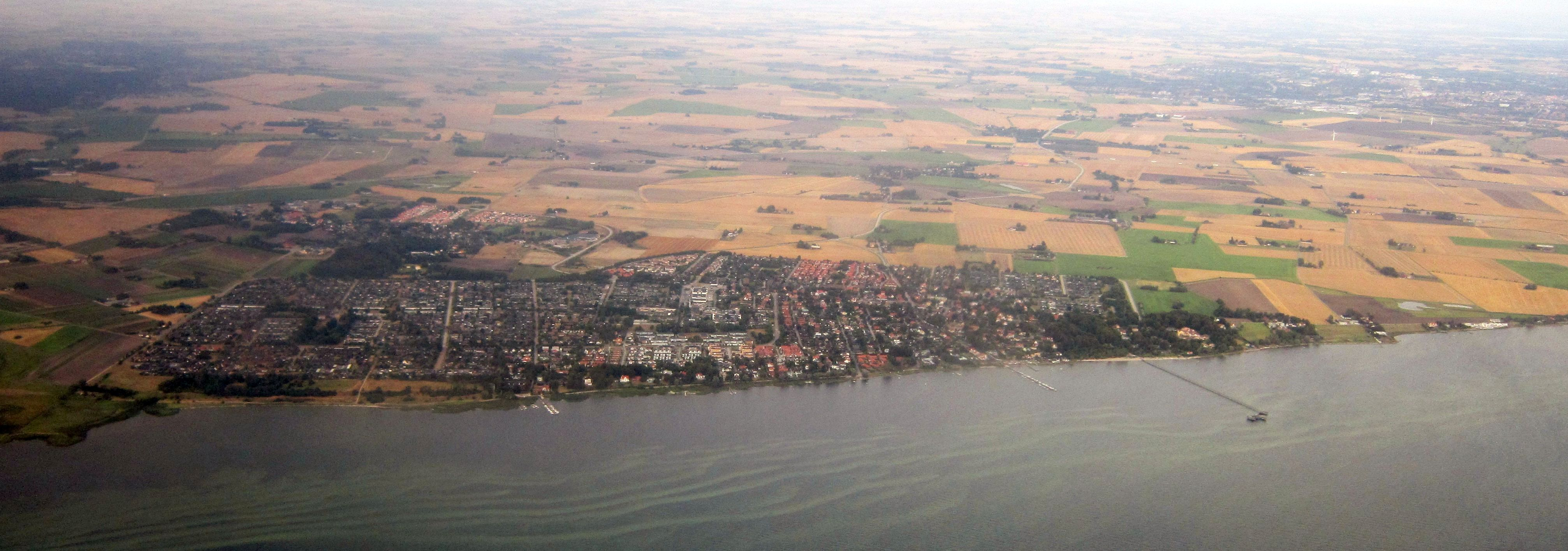
Aerial view showing the remarkably long bathing pier

== Sports ==
The handball club HK Ankaret is located within Bjärred, and is one of the most successful youth handball clubs in Sweden. As of the 2016-2017 season the team plays in Division 1.

Lomma-Bjärreds Tennis Klubb (LBTK) is a tennis club formed in 1956. It has produced several well-known players such as Caroline Magnusson and Henrik Sundström.

Professional football players Patrik "Bjärred" Andersson and his brother Daniel Andersson both played in the local team Bjärred IF.

== Notable natives ==
- Patrik Andersson, former football player in the Sweden men's national football team
- Daniel Andersson, football player in the Sweden men's national football team
- Andreas Johnson, singer
- Li Pamp
- Sanna Persson, actress
- Pär Sandå, entrepreneur
- Henrik Stenson, golfpro
- Henrik Sundström, tennis player
