= Mia Törnblom =

Swedish author and speaker

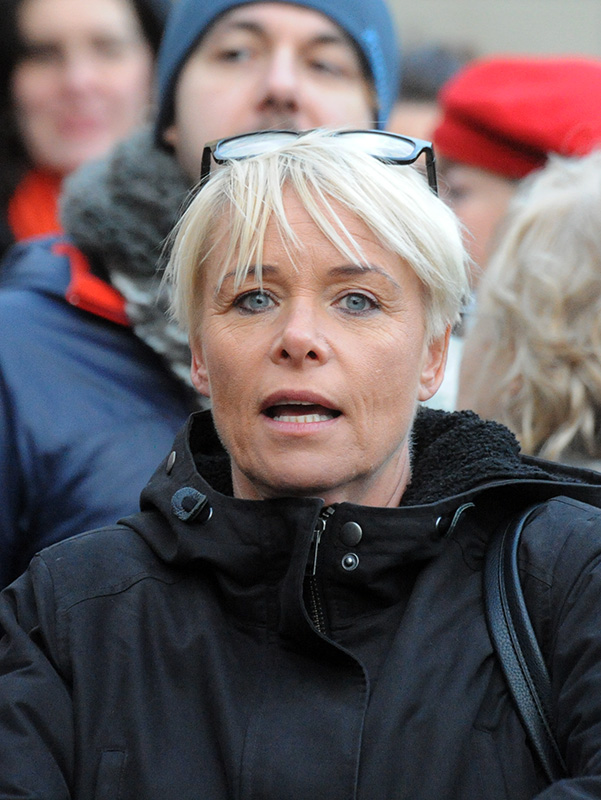
Mia Törnblom

Maria Suzanne "Mia" Törnblom, (born 10 May 1967 in Stockholm) is a Swedish author, speaker and educator in leadership. She speaks mostly about self-confidence and works with team education and has worked for Skandia Livs mentorship program. She has also been a presenter of the show Nyberg & Törnblom which was broadcast on TV3 in 2007 along with Renee Nyberg.

In 2007, she was a Sommarpratare in Sommar i P1 on Sveriges Radio.
