= Karin Laserow =

Swedish TV personality and antiques dealer

Karin Mailis Laserow (born 19 February 1950) is a Swedish antiques dealer and TV personality. She is an expert on the television show Bytt är bytt which is broadcast on TV4. She is a member of the Swedish art and antiques dealers association. She runs the antiques company Laserow Antik in Sweden and New York City. She is married to physiotherapist Kaj Laserow and lives in Brandstad, Sweden.

Laserow received attention when, in the first episode of Bytt är bytt, she almost broke a cello worth 500,000 SEK. Laserow is a dealer in high end Swedish antiques as well as interior designers specializing in residential design with offices in both Sweden and New York. She says she was never satisfied with minimalism style. Laserow's design services range from interior furnishings to complete renovations dealing with interior architecture, space planning, and site coordination. Laserow has been working with antique more than 30 years, and her interest in the theme grows more and more, although at the beginning she chose another profession. Laserow worked as a nurse, but then changed her mind and decided to deal with antiques. Laserow says:

"I like Baroque style, and I like Baroque music in the background, which creates a domestic life and atmosphere. Baroque is also a part of Sweden furniture design"

Laserow issued a book, Swedish Antiques, which was published by Skyhorse Publishing in 2013.

== Books ==
- Karin Mailis Laserow (2013). Swedish Antiques. Skyhorse Publishing

ISBN 9781620874851
