= Once Upon a Time in Phuket =

- Directed by: Staffan Lindberg
- Screenplay by: Peter Magnusson
- Produced by: Lena Rehnberg
- Starring: Peter Magnusson
- Cinematography: Simon Pramsten
- Release date: 3 February 2012 (Sweden)
- Running time: 105 minutes
- Country: Sweden
- Language: Swedish

Once Upon a Time in Phuket (Swedish: En gång i Phuket) is a 2012 Swedish film directed by Staffan Lindberg.

== Cast ==
- Peter Magnusson as Sven
- Susanne Thorson as Anja
- Jenny Skavlan as Gitte
- David Hellenius as Georg
- Grynet Molvig as Sven's mother
- Alexandra Rapaport as Siri
- Claes Månsson as the priest
- Frida Westerdahl as Estelle
- Frida Hallgren as Karin
- Matias Varela as Jean-Luc
- Henrik Norlén as Johan Pålman
- Yngve Dahlberg as Druve
- Johan Hallström as Magnus
- Mårten Klingberg as Fredrik
- Ella Fogelström as Sonja
- Lisbeth Johansson
