= David Hellenius =

Swedish comedian, television presenter and actor (born 1974)

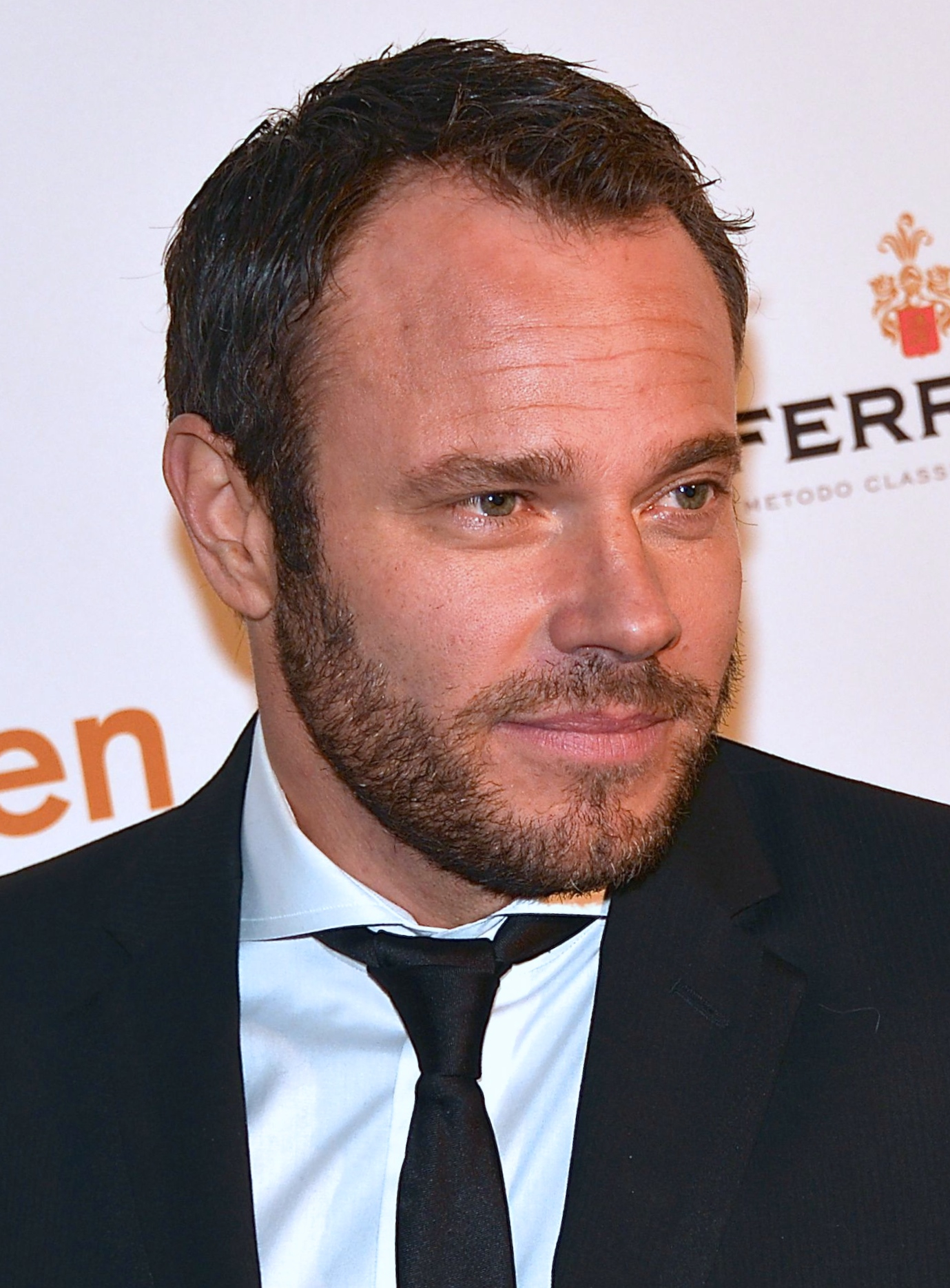
- Hellenius in 2013
- Born: Nils David Hellenius; 28 February 1974 (age 52); Järfälla, Sweden
- Occupations: television presenter, comedian, actor
- Years active: 1997–present
- Spouse: Renée Nyberg (m. 2009)

David Hellenius (born 28 February 1974) is a Swedish comedian, television presenter and actor, often co-operating with Peter Magnusson.

== Career ==
Hellenius started his television career at ZTV and later TV3. In 2004, he led the first season of the Swedish Idol series, "Idol 2004", on TV4 with Peter Magnusson. and Magnusson were later joined by Christine Meltzer to make the comedy show Hey Baberiba. Between 2006 and 2020, he presented Let's Dance (Swedish version of Strictly Come Dancing) which is broadcast on TV4.

Hellenius has also hosted Tack gode gud (Swedish version of Thank God You're Here), and he was one of the regular hosts of Fredag Hela Veckan, a Swedish version of Saturday Night Live. In 2012, he presented the first and so far only season of the talent singing show X Factor.

Hellenius and Magnusson also features in the Swedish films Sommaren med Göran - En midsommarnattskomedi (2009) and En Gång i Phuket (2012). Since 2010, Hellenius presents his own talkshow called Hellenius hörna on TV4. In 2014, he made a much publicized interview with the Prince Carl Philip.

He won a Kristallen award for "Best male television presenter" in 2010, 2013 and 2014.

Hellenius is a UNICEF ambassador since April 2011. On 24 June 2012, Hellenius hosted an episode of the Sveriges Radio series Sommar i P1.

It was reported in December 2015, that Hellenius had been made an offer by SVT to host Swedish coverage of the 2016 Eurovision Song Contest, but turned it down.

In 2021, Hellenius presented the first season of Masked Singer Sverige, which was broadcast on TV4.

== Personal life ==
Hellenius has been married to television presenter Renée Nyberg since 2009, and the couple has one son together who was born in 2006.

== Films ==
- 2009 - Sommaren med Göran - En midsommarnattskomedi
- 2011 - Stockholm - Båstad
- 2012 - En gång i Phuket
- 2014 - Kärlek deluxe
- 2014 - Micke & Veronica
- 2023 - Ett sista race (2023 film)

== Television ==
- Fredagspuls, TV4 1997–98 (with Tilde de Paula)
- Ventil, ZTV
- Rallyplaneten, TV4'
- Pyjamas, ZTV
- Pass På, ZTV
- Slussen, TV3
- Idol 2004, TV4
- Stadskampen - med David och Peter, TV4
- Hey Baberiba, TV4
- Let's Dance, TV4
- Tack gode gud!, TV4
- Fredag hela veckan, TV4
- Det sociala spelet, TV4
- Humorgalan, TV4
- Kändisdjungeln, TV4
- Hellenius hörna, TV4
- Stockholm - Båstad, TV4
- X Factor, TV4
- Helt sjukt, TV4
- Finaste Familjen, TV4
