= Iron pipe scandal =

Political scandal in Sweden

The iron pipe scandal (Swedish: järnrörsskandalen) was a political scandal in Sweden involving individuals related to the Sweden Democrats (Swedish: Sverigedemokraterna, SD). It occurred in 2010 but was only brought to mainstream public attention in 2012.

== Events ==
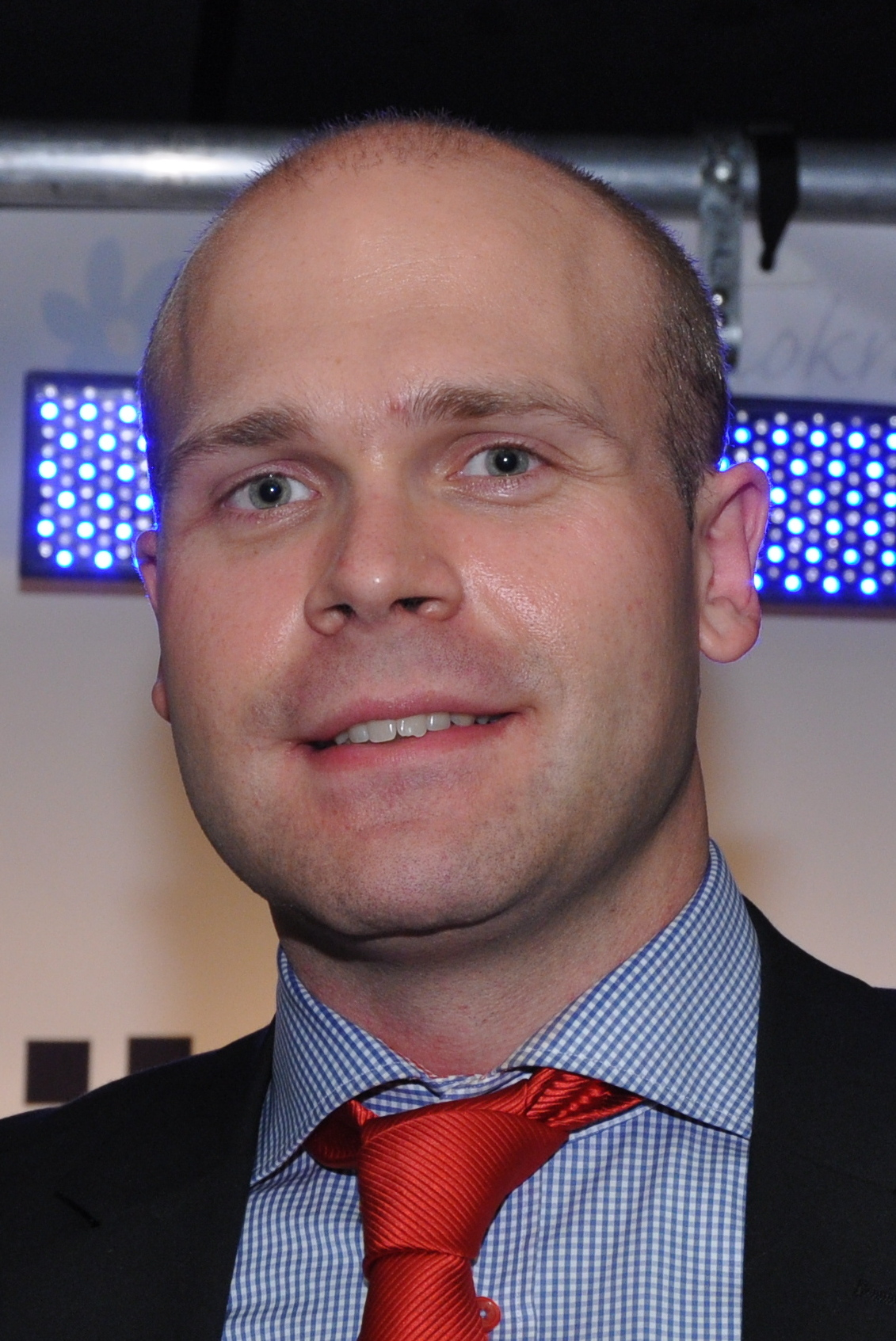
Erik Almqvist

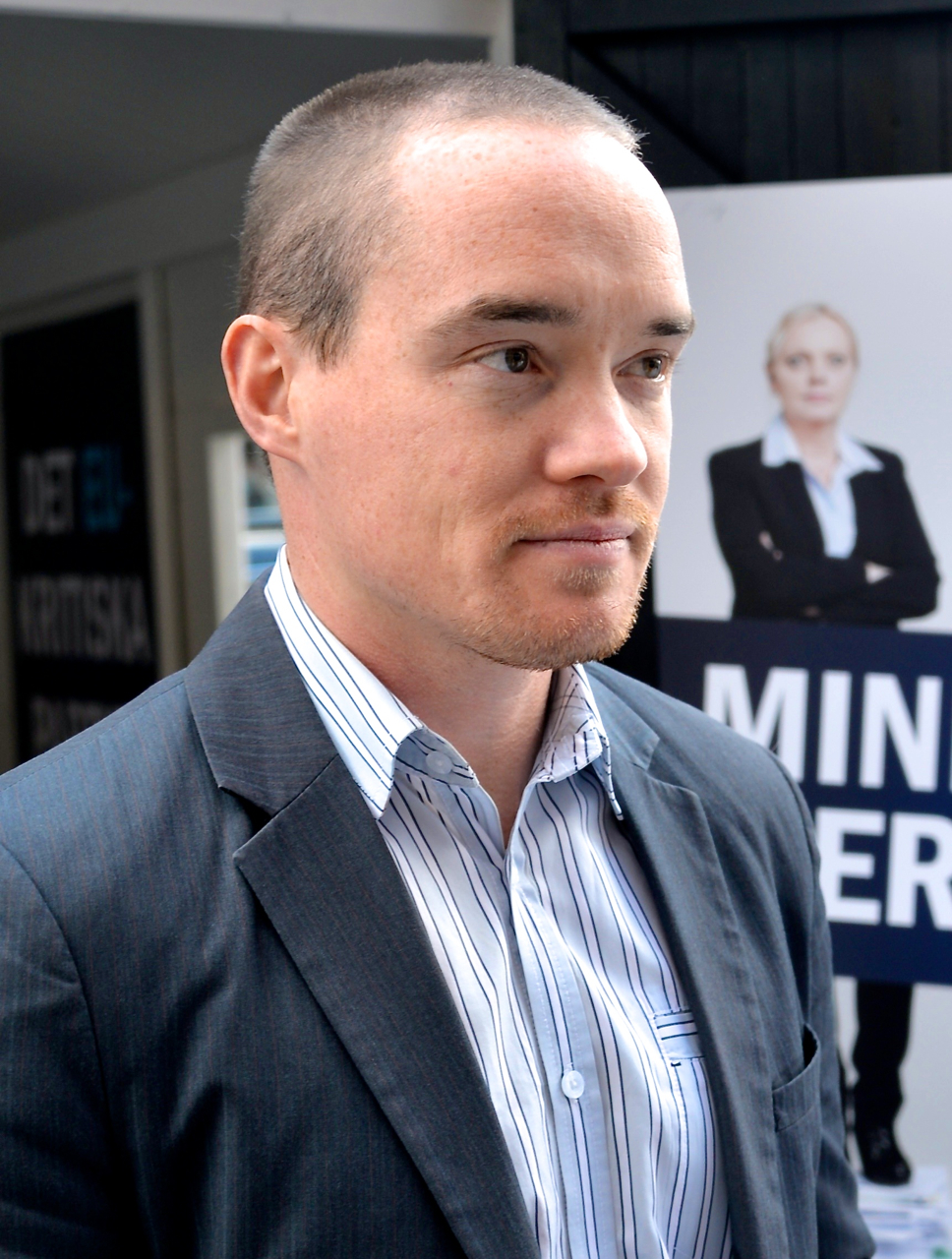
Kent Ekeroth

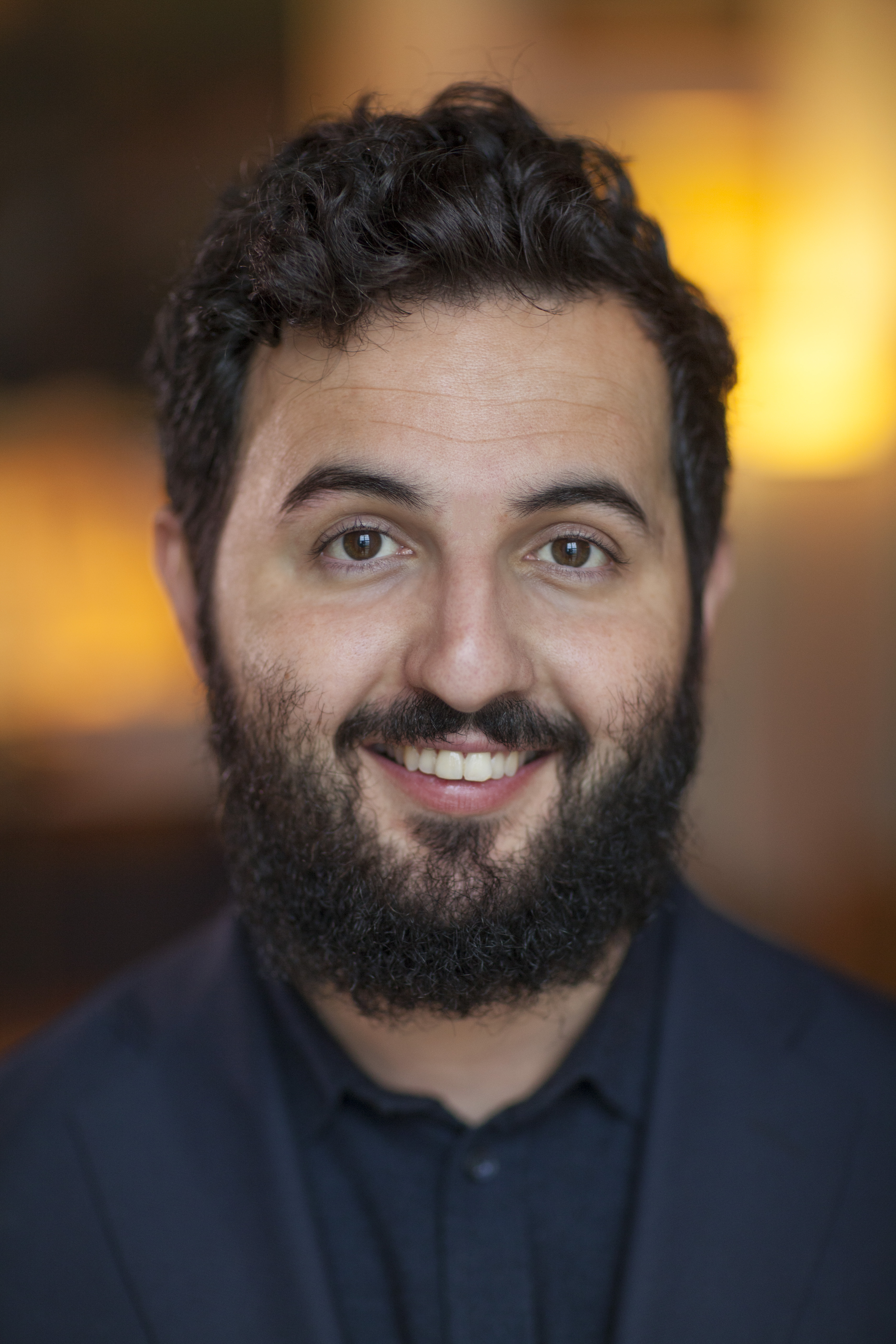
Soran Ismail

Erik Almqvist, Kent Ekeroth and Christian Westling, all high-ranking members of the Sweden Democrats (the first two were members of parliament when the incident was uncovered, Ekeroth as their candidate as Attorney General), had been involved in a verbal altercation with comedian Soran Ismail. Footage from the incident, captured by Ekeroth, shows that Erik Almqvist had told Ismail, who is of Kurdish descent, that he "acts like a wog", argues "like a little pussy" and that Sweden is "my country, not yours". He also called a woman "little whore" and a man "blatte lover". Ekeroth was also shown to shove a woman into the side of a car, and finally, the three politicians armed themselves with iron pipes from a nearby construction site after receiving a threat from a witness.

== Reactions from the party ==
Erik Almqvist initially denied any involvement in the scandal, but later confessed when the footage was released. The Sweden Democrats and Erik Almqvist justified the trio's actions by stating that Ismail had insulted them in his comedy routine, and that the man who had threatened them had claimed to belong to a criminal organization. Footage released later on proved that Almqvist had not believed the man's statement, and after talking to the police about the incident, casually remarked to the other two that "sucking up always helps".

The Sweden Democrats has also criticized Expressen, who released the initial story, for cherry picking only certain parts of the footage. Expressen responded by publishing the unedited footage, proving that the incident had indeed occurred as stated.

== Aftermath ==
After the events were uncovered, Erik Almqvist resigned from all of his party duties except for his parliamentary seat on 14 November 2012. On 30 December 2012, he resigned from his parliamentary seat and also rescinded his party membership. He later relocated to Hungary and has continued to manage the Sweden Democrat paper Samtiden.

Kent Ekeroth resigned from his assignment as spokesperson for justice policy on 21 November 2012 and took a two-month leave from his party duties. He has since filed copyright claims regarding the footage used and is highly active within the party again.
