= Ånäset =

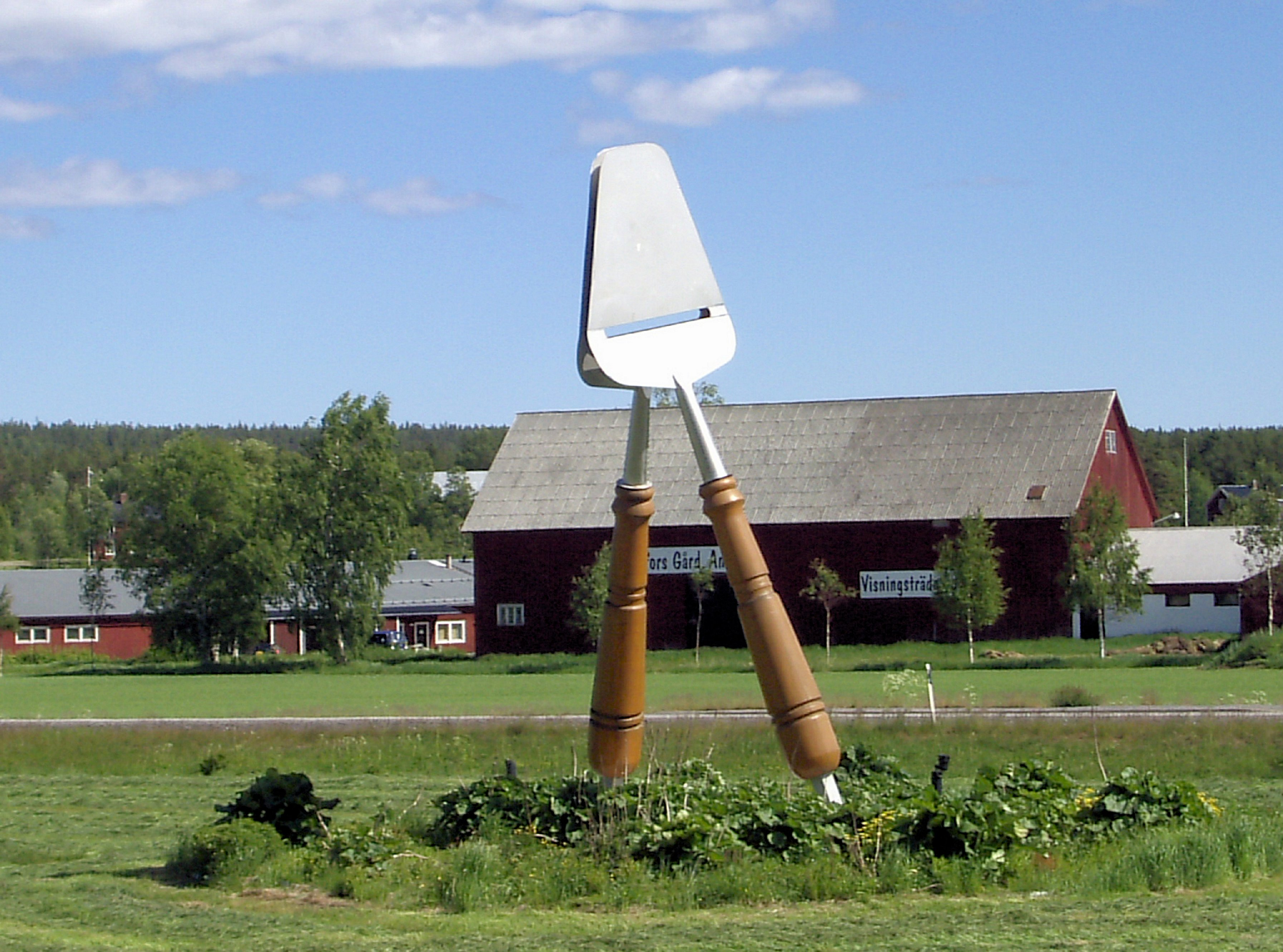
- The worlds greatest cheese slicer in Änäset

- Location within Västerbotten Location within Sweden
- Coordinates: 64°16′45″N 21°02′41″E
- Country: Sweden
- Province: Västerbotten
- County: Västerbotten County
- Municipality: Robertsfors Municipality

Area
  - Total: 1.21 km^{2} (0.47 sq mi)

Population (31 December 2010)
  - Total: 610
  - Density: 503/km^{2} (1,300/sq mi)
- Time zone: UTC+1 (CET)
  - Summer (DST): UTC+2 (CEST)

Ånäset is a locality situated in Robertsfors Municipality, Västerbotten County, Sweden with 610 inhabitants in 2010.
