= Casablanca (band) =

Swedish rock band

Casablanca is a Swedish rock band with members from several other notable groups: Josephine Forsman from the Sahara Hotnights (drums), Erik Stenemo from Melody Club (guitar), Anders Ljung from Space Age Baby Jane (vocals), Ryan Roxie from Roxy 77 (guitar), Mats Rubarth who previously played football professionally for AIK (bass), and Erik Almström from Bullet (guitar).

The band released three albums: their debut album Apocalyptic Youth in 2012, Riding a Black Swan in 2014, and concept album Miskatonic Graffiti in 2015.

In the final of Melodifestivalen 2010 they performed the 2009 winning song La Voix along with 2009 winner Malena Ernman. Later in the year they released the single Downtown.
