= Pavel Gamov =

Swedish politician (born 1989)

Member of the Riksdag
- In office 29 September 2014 – 24 September 2018
- Constituency: Skåne Southern

Personal details
- Born: 20 November 1989 (age 36) Moscow, Soviet Union (now Russia)
- Party: Sweden Democrats (until 2018); Independent (2018-present).

Pavel Gamov (born 20 November 1989) is a Russian-born former Swedish politician who was a member of the Riksdag, first as a member of the Sweden Democrats and then as an independent.

== Career ==
Gamov was born in Moscow before moving to Sweden with his family. He became active in the Sweden Democrats in the late 2000s. Gamov was the SD group leader in the municipal council of Uppsala municipality. It was later noticed Gamov had also had some contacts with the National Democrats as a teenager, however Gamov claimed to have distanced himself from the party and described himself as "politically immature" at the time. Politically, he describes himself as a national conservative. He was elected to the Riksdag for the SD in 2014 Swedish general election and was a member of the Riksdag's EU Committee.

Since 2020, Gamov has been an employee of the Swedish alternative news service Exakt24.

=== Trip to Russia ===
In 2017, Gamov made a controversial trip to Russia to observe the 2017 Moscow municipal elections, despite being advised not to. According to Aftonbladet the trip was paid for by a close associate of Vladimir Putin. Journalist Chang Frick of the Swedish libertarian newspaper Nyheter Idag accompanied Gamov on the trip. During their time in Moscow, Frick accused Gamov of getting drunk, calling sex workers to his hotel room and demanding that the host country pay for his bar check. Aftonbladet also claimed that Gamov behaved in a threatening manner during the visit. The subsequent media attention led to calls from within the Sweden Democrats party for Gamov to resign and SD group leader Mattias Karlsson stated there would be an investigation into the incident. Gamov subsequently quit the party and sat as an independent before losing his seat in the 2018 election.
