= Hey Baberiba =

- Genre: Sketch comedy
- Presented by: David Hellenius
- Starring: David Hellenius; Peter Magnusson; Christine Meltzer
- Country of origin: Sweden
- Original language: Swedish
- No. of seasons: 4
- No. of episodes: 40 + 2 New Years Specials

Production
- Producer: Baluba
- Running time: 40-30 minutes (incl. commercials)

Original release
- Network: TV4 Sweden
- Release: 4 February 2005 – 24 November 2006

Hey Baberiba was a comedy show on TV4 in Sweden, where three comedians made impersonations of different Swedish celebrities. The show was a success for TV4 and ran for four seasons.

It received a lot of publicity and many fans for its portrayal of the Swedish royal family. No new season is planned by TV4.

The three hosts all continued to the show Fredag Hela Veckan, a Swedish version of Saturday Night Live. The name comes from Hey Baberiba, a Swedish cover of Hey! Ba-Ba-Re-Bop.
