= Pär Olof Sandå =

Swedish entrepreneur (born 1965)

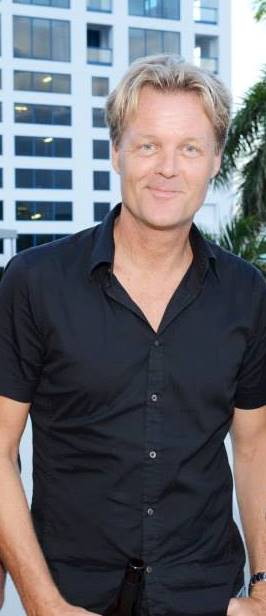
- Pär Olof Sandå at North Beach Village Resort
- Born: Pär Olof Sandå; 22 June 1965 (age 61); Bjärred, Skåne County, Sweden
- Occupations: Investor, Hotelier

Pär Sandå (born 22 June 1965) is a Swedish entrepreneur, developer and stock trader. His accomplishments include establishing the Pan Capital Group, also known as Pan Capital Aktiebolag, an international stock market trading company and redeveloping the North Beach Village, an area of 1950's mid-century hotels and resorts in Fort Lauderdale, Florida.

== Biography ==
Sandå was born in Bjärred, a coastal locality located in Lomma Municipality, Skåne County, Sweden. In 2010 it had a population of 9,542. It is located roughly 20 km north of Malmö and 10 km west of Lund. He was raised by his mother, father and has one younger sister. He attended Lund University (Swedish: Lunds Universitet) where he received a bachelor's degree in economics. While Sandå has a successful and attention-drawing career history, he makes it a point to stay out of the spotlight for the sake of his and his family's privacy.. Pär Sandå was recently named as one of the 40 hottest Swedes in the US right now

== The Pan Capital Group ==
Upon graduation from Lund University, Sandå commenced his professional career in the financial world as an institutional broker at Stockholm Brokerage. His strengths and prowess were recognized early, especially by trading director Bo Mattsson. When Mattsson was recruited to Swedbank in 1990, he brought Sandå with him as an institutional broker with the intention to further develop Sandå's potential and talent.

During his employment at Swedbank, Sandå and colleague Bengt Larsson attended Tony Saliba's trading school in Chicago for three months in 1991. The knowledge Sandå gained here greatly influenced the success he went on to experience. Sandå and Larsson returned to Swedbank and commenced building the trading department. The duo expanded to include Claes-Henrik Julander, Henrik Hedman, Magnus Hedman, Fredrik Landin, and Richard Warneker. The close-knit group's practice of aggressive trading brought the company increased market share as well as earnings.

In September 1996, the group joined Rivus, a subsidiary of Oresund, but after building up the company, Sandå and the group moved on to a new partner. The group's next partnership began in 1997 with Erik Penser, Swedish financier and businessman. The group established Pan Capital in 1998 and their joint venture with Penser resulted in earning Penser a very healthy profit. Their relationship lasted until 2009 when the partners split up and Pan Capital became independent.

The company now has offices in Stockholm and Florida. Pan Capital is extremely private about its business practices and tries to keep out of the public eye. According to Affärsvärlden, a Swedish business magazine, “the company is a member of several of the world's major stock exchanges, with about 95 per cent of their transactions are made outside Sweden.”

In September 2013, Pan Capital, along with 22 other investment firms were charged with "violating a rule that prohibits firms from shorting a stock within a five-day window of a public offering, and then buying the same security through the offering." Pan Capital settled the charges and agreed to pay back profits made from the stock and the fines to the United States Department of the Treasury which totaled over $660,000.

== The North Beach Village ==
In 2010, during the recession, Pan Capital looked into alternative investments and turned to South Florida's real estate market. the company purchased over 35 properties on Fort Lauderdale's barrier island in what will come to be known as the North Beach Village, gathering them under the umbrella of the North Beach Village Resorts. The village's title comes from the name of the zoning district: North Beach Residential Area.

Most of the properties purchased by Pan Capital are 1950's mid-century modern hotels and resorts. Sandå is redeveloping the area, renovating and updating the properties one by one, re-opening them as distinctive boutique hotels, each with their own personality and theme. Acquisitions include: TropiRock, The Winterset Suites, Robindale Suites, North Beach Village Hotel, The Grand Palm Plaza, Hotel Lush Royale, La Casa Resort, Royal Palms Resort and Spa, The Aqua Hotel, The Plaza Bistro, Tara Hotel, Tranquilo Hotel, Cocobelle Resort, and The Beach Gardens Hotel. The North Beach Village Resorts offer a mixture of accommodations catering to families and singles in addition to LGBT tourism travelers.

The work in progress is intended to be a pedestrian friendly European-style village area where visitors and locals alike can stroll along streets lined with art galleries, cafes, and retail shops. Sandå wishes to make the cornerstones of this project - peace, love and happiness - evident in all facets of the North Beach Village. Construction is expected to be complete in the coming years.
