= Li Pamp =

Swedish television presenter and antiquities expert

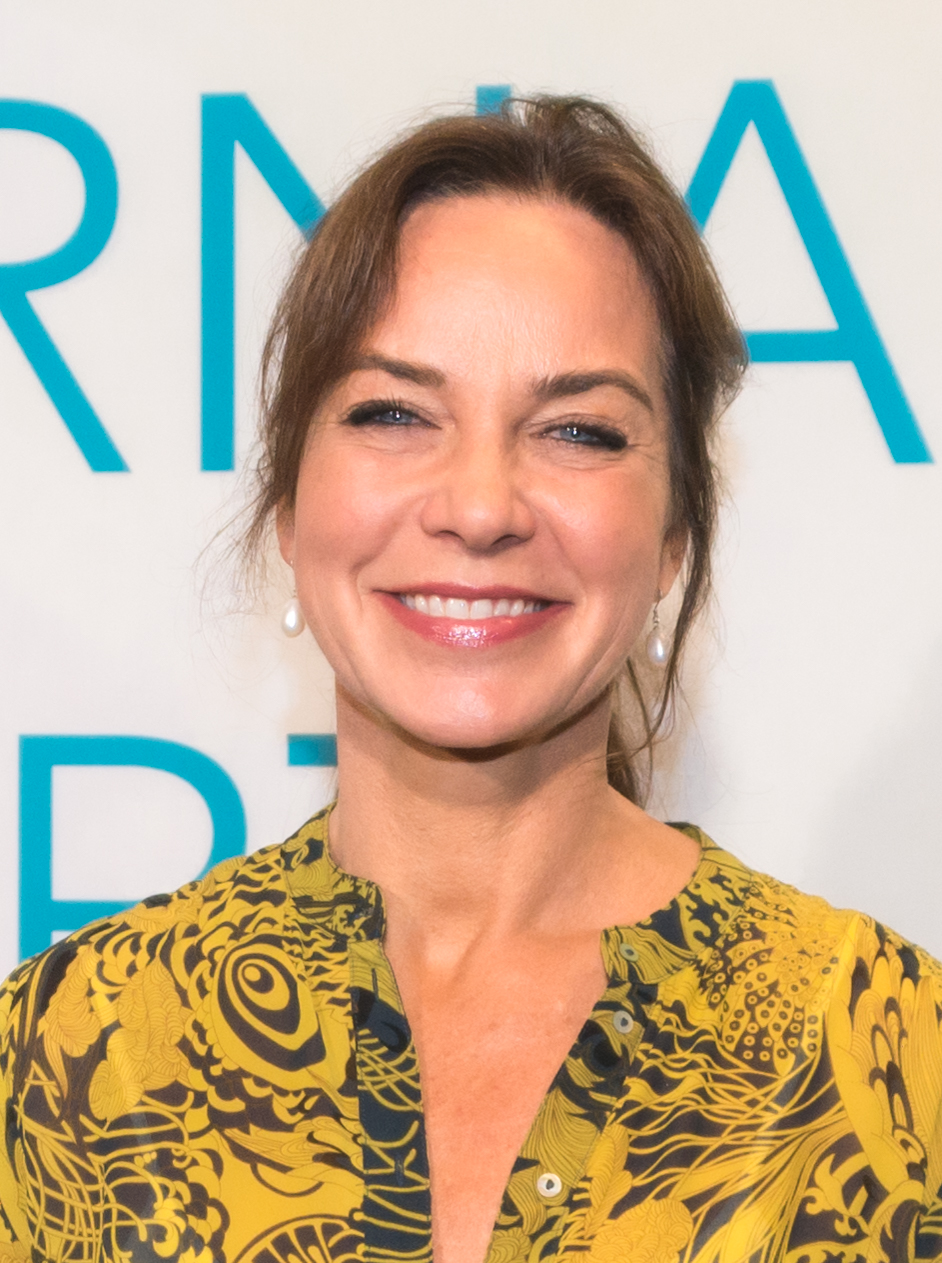
Pamp in 2019.

Li Marlene Pamp (born Carlström, 4 August 1972 in Malmö) is a Swedish television presenter and expert on antiquities. Pamp was born in Malmö and grew up in Bjärred in Skåne and later moved to Saltsjöbaden in Stockholm. She studied art science at Lunds University and has worked at Bukowskis in Malmö and Stockholms Auktionsverk. She is an expert at 1900s design and has created the antiquities site Deconet.

Li Pamp presents the show Antikmagasinet and is an expert at Antikrundan, Go'kväll and Nordiska Rum which are all broadcast on SVT. In 2008, she made her TV-debut at Antikdeckarna on TV4 Plus.

On 20 July 2013, she was the presenter for an episode of the Sveriges Radio show Sommar i P1.
