= Kent Ekeroth =

Swedish politician & economist (born 1981)

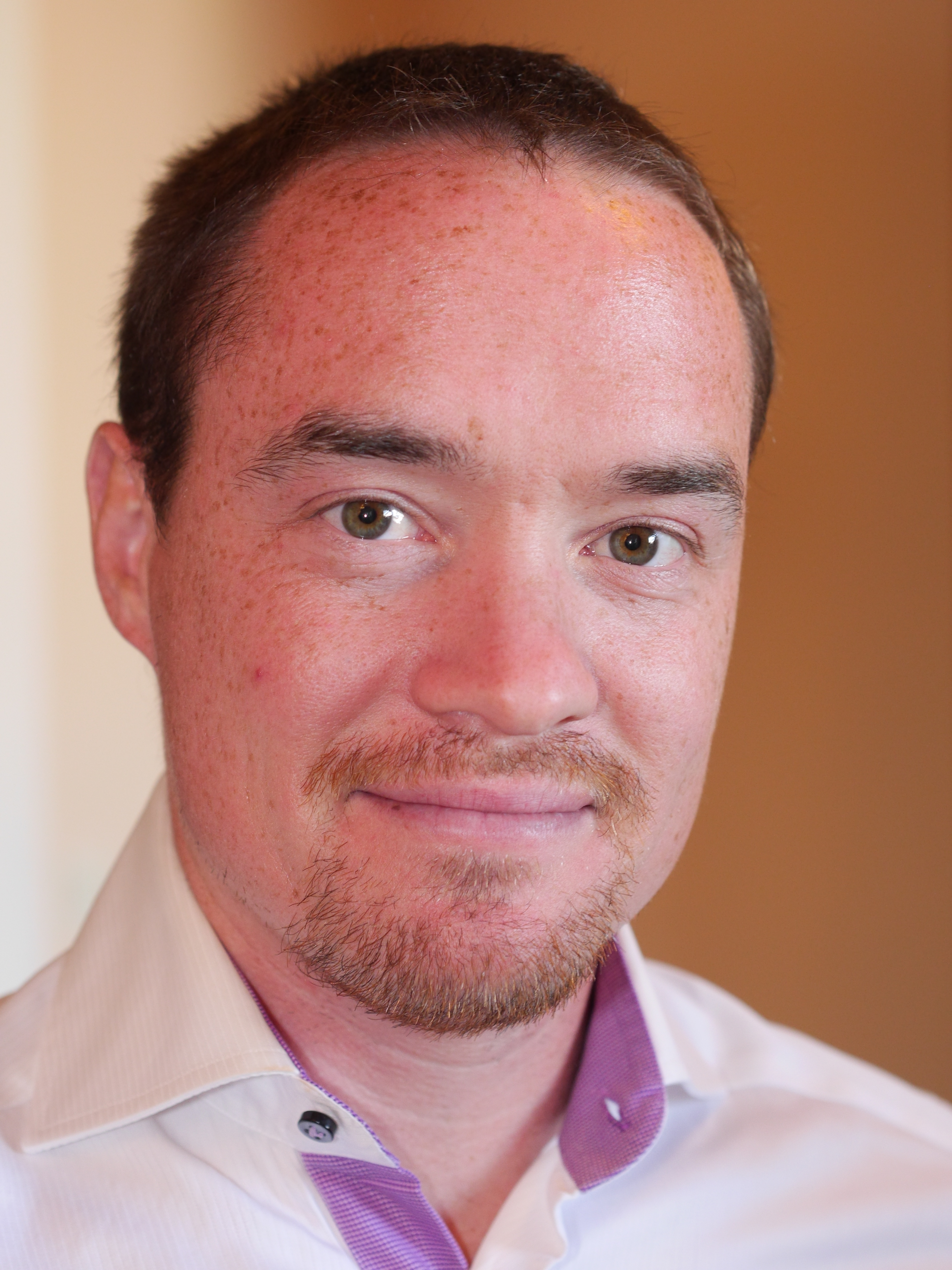
- Ekeroth in 2016

Member of the Riksdag for Skåne County
- In office 4 October 2010 – 24 September 2018

Personal details
- Born: Kent Alexander Ekeroth; 11 September 1981 (age 45) Malmö, Sweden
- Party: Sweden Democrats
- Relatives: Ted Ekeroth (brother)
- Education: Lund University
- Profession: Economist

Kent Alexander Ekeroth (born 11 September 1981) is a Swedish politician and economist, who represented the Sweden Democrats in the Riksdag from 2010 to 2018.

Ekeroth served as the SD legal policy spokesman until 2012 and was the party's international secretary from 2007 to 2017. He stepped down from the Riksdag ahead of the 2018 Swedish general election at the request of the party's leadership and announced his intention to move to Hungary. However, he made a small return to politics and since 2022 has been a regional councilor in Dalarna for the Sweden Democrats.

Ekeroth has been involved with operating the news website Samhällsnytt and its predecessors since the beginning of his parliamentary term.

== Early life ==
=== Biography and education ===
Ekeroth was born in Malmö to a family of Kazakhstani-Jewish descent. His mother Janina Kazarina was originally from Kazakhstan in Central Asia (which was then part of the Soviet Union), who arrived as a refugee from Poland to Sweden in the 1970s, together with her mother, Ekeroth's grandmother and sisters. He has a twin brother Ted Ekeroth who is also active in the Sweden Democrats and was a former member of Lund City Council. In a 2012 interview, Ekeroth said that he identified as culturally Jewish with an atheistic life stance.

In a National Swedish Radio interview conducted in 2012, Ekeroth traced the origins of his political views to his time at Östergårds School in Halmstad in an immigrant-dominated class. He said that his school saw conflicts between pupils if different foreign backgrounds and that he was bullied by "groups of immigrants from Africa and the Middle East" and connected his experience to the overall immigration problems. Journalist Gellert Tamas argued that a majority of students at the Halmstad school were Swedish or had their background in Eastern Europe. Other students from his time at Östergårds have said in interviews that Ekeroth was "a quiet, shy kid" and claim he was subjected to antisemitic bullying by his class and "perhaps the entire school".

After graduating from high school, Ekeroth studied a bachelor's degree economics at Lund University.

== Early career ==
After graduating, Ekeroth began working at the Swedish Ministry for Foreign Affairs. He wad fired from an internship at the Swedish embassy in Tel Aviv, Israel in October 2006 after the embassy had found out about his involvement with the Sweden Democrats. The embassy's actions were later criticised by the Swedish Chancellor of Justice, Göran Lambertz, who ruled that the firing was illegal and a breach of the Swedish constitutional laws. The Ministry for Foreign Affairs, who are responsible for all Swedish embassies abroad, also had to pay damages to Ekeroth.

== Political career ==
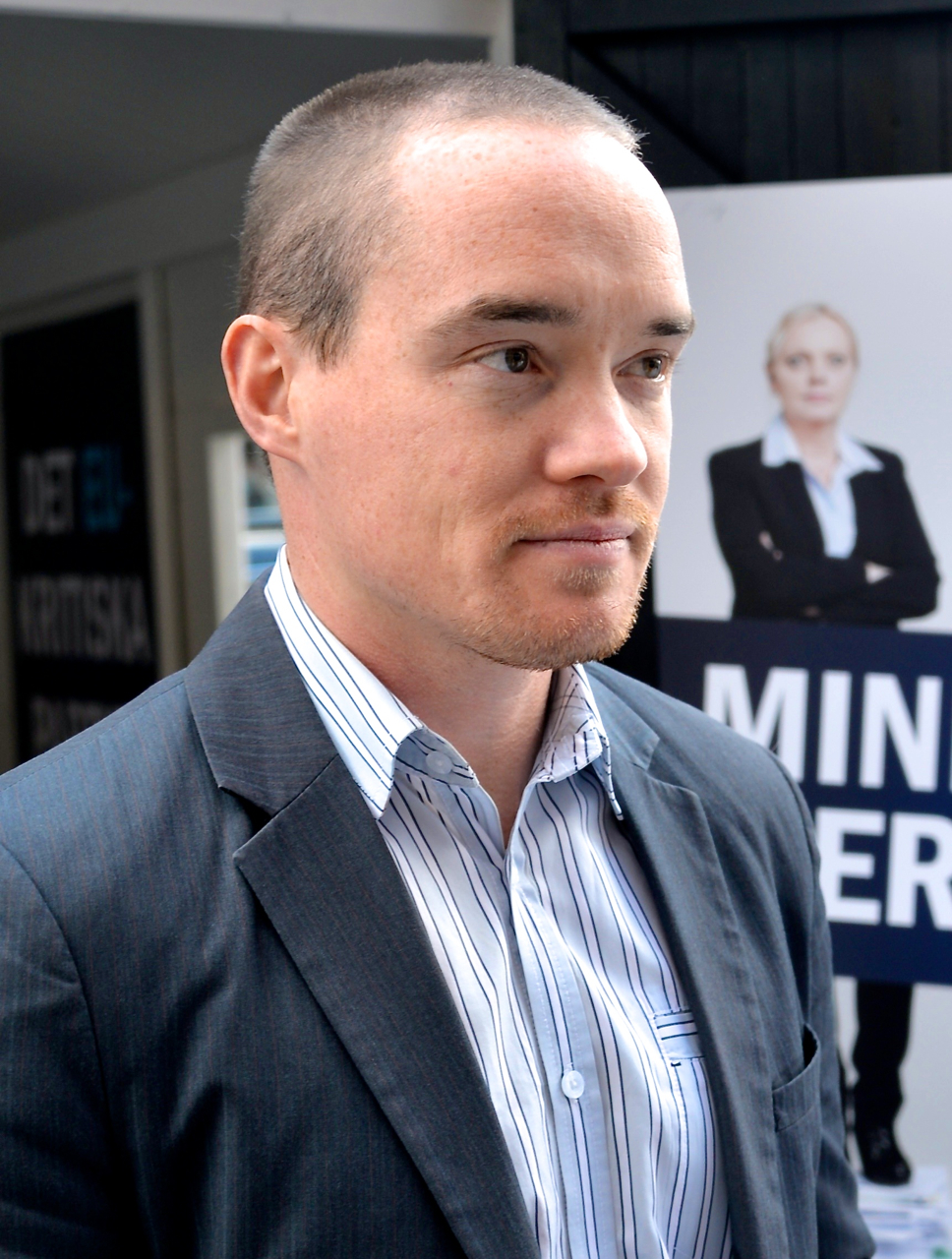
Ekeroth in 2014

Ekeroth joined the Sweden Democrats in 2006. He stood for the party during the 2009 European Parliament election in Sweden and received the most personal votes out of all the candidates on the SD's list but was not elected. From 2007 to 2017, he was the party's secretary for international affairs. He participated in an international counter-jihad conference in 2009, and was "deeply involved" in the counter-jihad movement along with his twin brother, Ted Ekeroth, a local politician for the Sweden Democrats in the Lund Municipality. The two brothers were instrumental in introducing the party to the international counter-jihad movement, after Ted participated in the two inaugural official counter-jihad conferences in 2007, in Copenhagen and in Brussels. In 2011, Ekeroth and the Sweden Democrats said he was no longer involved with the counter-jihad movement.

=== Member of Parliament ===
Ekeroth was a member of the Riksdag from 4 October 2010 after being elected in the general election the same year. Ekeroth represented the Stockholm County constituency. In parliament, he has been a member of the Committee on Justice and a deputy member of Committee on European Union Affairs. Ekeroth was a board member of the pan-European eurosceptic European Alliance for Freedom.

In February 2018, the head of the Sweden Democrats election committee, Michael Rosenberg, confirmed that Ekeroth would not be on the party's proposed list of candidates for the parliament in the next elections. In a statement, the party leadership said "we believe that in his choice of lifestyle, conduct and judgment he fails to live up to the high standards that the party places on representatives in criminal policy issues" and that "Kent Ekeroth's trust in large parts of the public has been damaged by a number of different incidents over the years." In the same month, Ekeroth delivered a speech, partly in Hungarian, which was highly critical of Sweden, in the Swedish Parliament. Ekeroth also hinted at plans of moving to Hungary, following in the footsteps of brother and former politician Ted Ekeroth.

=== Iron pipe scandal ===
In November 2012, Ekeroth took a break from his duties after the leakage of a video filmed with his mobile phone from an event which became known as the Iron pipe scandal. Erik Almqvist had two years earlier published an edited version of the video to show how he and his party colleagues Ekeroth and Christian Westling had been verbally abused that evening. An unedited version of the film was released in November 2012 by Expressen which showed Almqvist and Ekeroth behaving in a threatening manner towards a young woman and Almqvist using racist and sexist remarks without Ekeroth reacting against it. While Almqvist was forced to resign, Ekeroth was allowed to remain in parliament but was removed from his role as SD legal spokesman and asked to suspend all his Committee work duties. The decision was criticized by Social Democratic Party politician and chairman of the Committee on Justice, Morgan Johansson who was quoted as saying "I wonder what his constituents will think of him being in the Riksdag and getting paid without any real duties". On 28 November 2012, Chief Prosecutor Mats Åhlund announced that an investigation would not be opened against Ekeroth.

Ekeroth later sued and invoiced the Swedish newspapers who used the film or stills from the event. For example, Svenska Dagbladet received an invoice of 51,725 Swedish kronor (approximately €5,500). Ekeroth was awarded compensation in several such cases after taking the matter to the Swedish Supreme Court.

On January 24, 2013, Ekeroth's political hiatus ended when he became a deputy member of the EU Committee and the Economic and Social Affairs Committee.

== Media career ==
Ekeroth was involved in registering the Swedish opinion and blogsite Politically Incorrect in 2011 which is loosely affiliated to the Sweden Democrats. He has denied editorial involvement in the news website Avpixlat, though he has been in communication with the editorial staff via emails and the site uses his personal bank account to manage its finances. Avpixlat has been called a "hate site", for what are claimed to be expressions of violence and xenophobia. Ekeroth has also denied publishing any articles at the news website, but was quickly found to have published articles as recently as one month before his denial. The tax authorities also found him legally obliged to pay taxes on those donations to Avpixlat, of which 70,000 Swedish kronor had immediately been further transferred to other private accounts owned by Ekeroth.

As Avpixlat has been discontinued, Ekeroth has moved on to register the website Samhällsnytt in his name, and operate it, along with chief editor Tommy Carlsson, former Sweden Democrats politician Erik Almqvist, Russian-born journalist "Egor Putilov" (a pseudonym for Alexander Yarovenko, currently known as Martin Dahlin), and others associated with Sweden Democrats.

Ekeroth has ties to Tommy Robinson, appearing on Robinson's podcast Silenced in 2024. Ekeroth had previously interviewed Robinson for Samhällsnytt in 2020, and had met in Brussels in 2010 according to Robinson.

== Personal life ==
Ekeroth resided in Budapest, Hungary, having moved there in March 2018. As of 2022, he has relocated to Sweden.

=== Assault and verdict ===
On 24 November 2016, Ekeroth was reported to the police for assault after an incident involving a 20-year-old male outside of the Solidaritet nightclub at Stureplan in Stockholm. The alleged victim claims that he made a sarcastic comment relating to the "Iron pipe scandal" towards the politician before being punched by Ekeroth. Ekeroth argued self-defense while witnesses from the queue alleged that no punches were thrown at Ekeroth by the victim or anyone else. Prior to the incident, Ekeroth had twice been denied entry to the nightclub in question. The club's bouncers claim that Ekeroth was highly intoxicated and was acting aggressively at the time. According to club management, Ekeroth was denied entry to the club as they could not guarantee his and other patrons safety, due to the politician's highly intoxicated state, while Ekeroth claims that he was denied entry due to his political views and also that he was attacked one month earlier on his way from work. Journalists noted that Ekeroth has previously been involved in bar and club incidents, both as an attacker and a victim. In response, to the incident SD leader Jimmie Akesson told Ekeroth to take a "political time out" and step down from his role in the Riksdag Justice Committee.

On 3 February 2017, following the conclusion of the investigation, the prosecutor filed charges for assault. In June 2017, Ekeroth was found guilty of assault by the court found Ekeroth and he was sentenced to pay a fine. The Svea Court of Appeal later overturned the verdict on the grounds that the prosecutor had failed to disprove that Ekeroth acted in self-defence. In December 2017, Ekeroth was acquitted of all charges of assault.
