= Fria Tider =

Swedish-language online newspaper

- Type: Daily newspaper
- Format: Online newspaper
- Editor-in-chief: Widar Nord
- Founded: 2009; 17 years ago
- Language: Swedish
- Headquarters: Tallinn
- Country: Sweden
- Website: friatider.se

Fria Tider (Free Times) is a Swedish-language right-wing populist news site. Oxford Internet Institute's Project on Computational Propaganda identified Fria Tider as one of the three primary "junk news" sources in Sweden. Analysis by Swedish Defence University lists Fria Tider as having the highest proportion of disinformation among Swedish sources.

Fria Tider actively promotes Kremlin narratives and content by Sputnik, a Russian propaganda outlet. Fria Tider is known to promote views in favor of the Russian annexation of Crimea and the Russian invasion of Ukraine.

Research by Swedish Defence Research Agency concluded that news by Fria Tider are much more frequently shared by Twitter bots, compared to news from other sources. An analysis of 12 million online links made by The New York Times concluded that much of Fria Tider's traffic is generated by non-Swedish-language websites.
