= Renée Nyberg =

Swedish television presenter and journalist

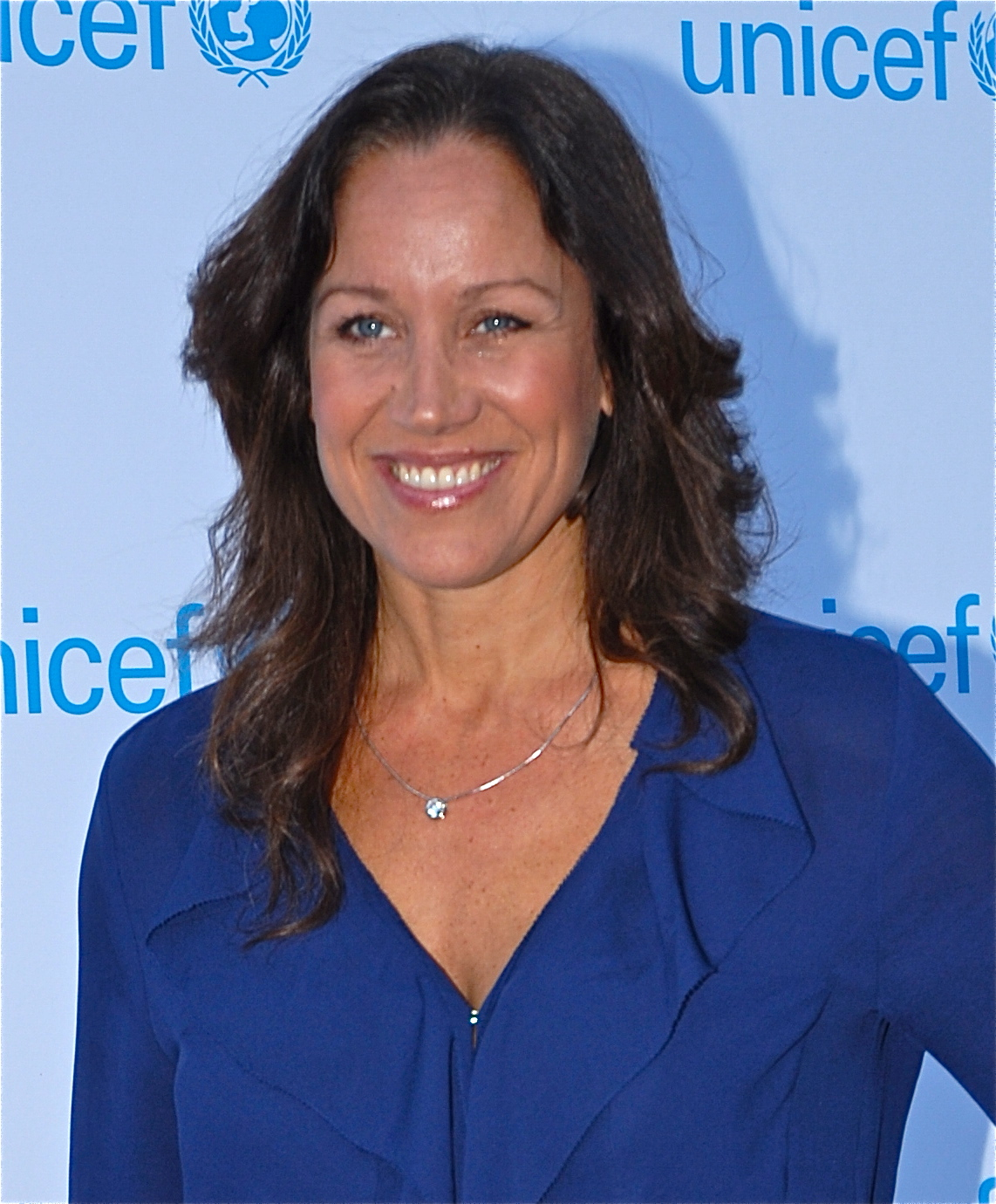
- Nyberg in 2012
- Born: Eva Reneé Agneta Nyberg; 17 May 1966 (age 59); Vantör, Sweden
- Occupations: Television presenter, journalist
- Spouses: Jan Zachrisson (div. 2003) David Hellenius (m. 2009)
- Children: 3 (two with Zachrisson, one with Hellenius)

Eva Renée Agneta Nyberg (born 17 May 1966) is a Swedish television presenter and journalist. She made her television debut at the TV4 news show in the early 1990s. She then worked for TV3 until 2014 presenting several shows such as Blåsningen, Byggfällan, 45 minuter and the Miljonjakten. Since September 2014, Nyberg is an employee at TV4 hosting the game show Bytt är bytt.

Nyberg is married to TV4 television presenter David Hellenius and the couple have a son who was born in 2006.

== TV programs ==
- Byggfällan, TV3 (2010)
- Blåsningen, TV3 (2010)
- Cirkus Zlatan, TV3 (May 2008)
- Nyberg & Törnblom, TV3 (2007-)
- Singalong, TV3 (2006-)
- 45 minuter, TV3
- Klassfesten, TV3
- Vänner för livet, TV3
- Vilda djur?, TV3
- Slussen 22.00, TV3
- Tur i kärlek, TV4
- Stora famnen
- Bytt är bytt, TV4 (2014-)
