= Christine Meltzer =

Swedish television host and entertainer

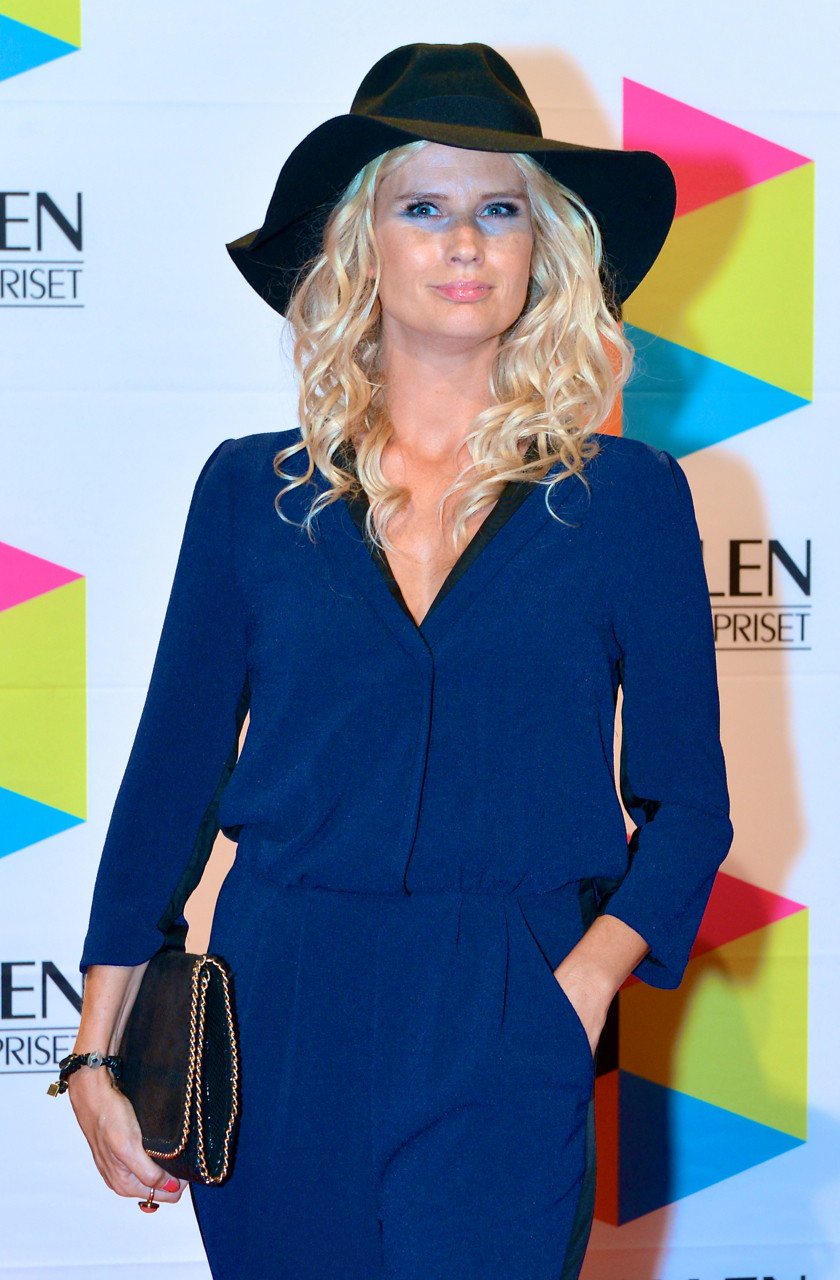
- Christine Meltzer in 2013
- Born: Marie Christine Meltzer; 4 December 1974 (age 50); Viksjö, Sweden
- Occupation(s): Television host, comedian
- Known for: Hey Baberiba
- Spouse: Niclas Lind (m. 2008)
- Children: 2

Marie Christine Meltzer Lind (born 4 December 1974 in Viksjö) is a Swedish television hostess, actress and comedian. She rose to fame as an impersonator on the TV4 comedy show Hey Baberiba. She has also hosted the Swedish version of Popstars and hosted the 2010 Melodifestivalen with Måns Zelmerlöw and Dolph Lundgren. Since 2010, she has taken over as main host of Dansbandskampen, she has been named "Sweden's funniest woman".

== Career ==
Meltzer's television career began in 1997 when she hosted Lattjo Lajban with David Hellenius. In 2001, Meltzer hosted the dating show När och fjärran and the following year she presented the Swedish version of Popstars for Kanal 5. In 2004, Dagens Nyheter called Meltzer "something rare in Swedish scenes: a young girl that both can and dare let stylish clip blanket and be asrolig".

In 2005, Meltzer's big break came when she was one of three comedians to star in the comedy show Hey Baberiba. She did impressions for many well known celebrities including Carola Häggkvist, Lena Philipsson, Pernilla Wahlgren, Queen Silvia and Tina Nordström. In 2007, she took part in the first series of Tack gode gud (Swedish version of the Australian Thank God You're Here).

In 2010, Meltzer, together with Måns Zelmerlöw and Dolph Lundgren hosted the 2010 edition of the Melodifestivalen., the winner of the festival was Anna Bergendahl with the song "This Is My Life", in addition Meltzer provided the SVT television commentary at the 2010 Eurovision Song Contest along with Edward af Sillén. In 2011, she hosted the 2011 edition of Inför Eurovision Song Contest. In 2024, she had a lead role in the SVT Christmas calendar ”Snödrömmar”.

== Personal life ==
Meltzer is married to Niclas Lind, the couple have two children. Her daughter Ida-Lova is a singer.
