= Sahara Hotnights =

Swedish rock band

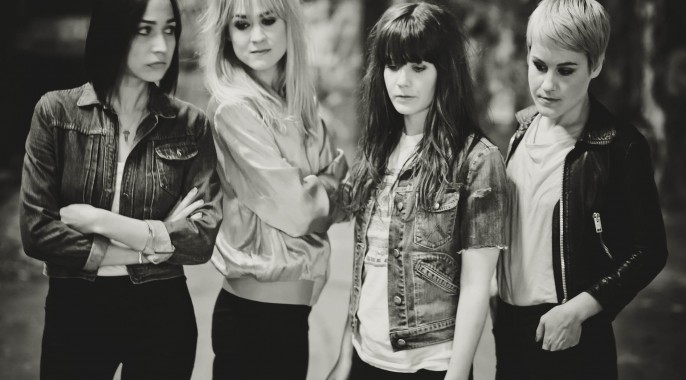

Background information
- Origin: Robertsfors, Sweden
- Genres: Indie rock, garage rock revival
- Years active: 1992–2011, 2019–present
- Label: SonyBMG / Speech / RCA / Stand By Your Band
- Members: Maria Andersson; Josephine Forsman; Jennie Asplund; Johanna Asplund

Sahara Hotnights are a Swedish rock band from Robertsfors. Since its inception, the band has been composed of lead singer Maria Andersson, drummer Josephine Forsman and sisters Jennie (lead guitar) and Johanna (bass) Asplund. Their style incorporates elements of garage rock, power pop and punk rock. The band scored two top-ten singles and five top-ten albums in their native Sweden during their initial run between 1992 and 2011. The band reformed in 2019, releasing their seventh album Love in Times of Low Expectations in 2022.

== History ==
The band formed sometime around 1991/1992 "due to boredom". While in Australia, Josephine Forsman bet on a horse named Sahara Hotnights and used the name for the band. Around 1995, they won a "battle of the bands" contest and were rewarded with a chance to record their songs in a studio, including demo cassette "Oh Darcy". Their debut EP, Suits Anyone Fine, was released in 1997 to immediate success and critical acclaim in Europe. Soon afterwards, the band signed with the Swedish label Speech Records, and over the next two years released three further singles, "Face Wet", "Oh Darling!" and "Nothing Yet". In 1999, Sahara Hotnights released their debut studio album C'mon Let's Pretend, which earned two Grammis nominations.

The Drive Dead Slow EP appeared in April 2000, released on the BMG label, before the band's second album Jennie Bomb (named for Jennie Asplund) was released in 2001 (2002 in the US). The timing of its release coincided with a surge in interest in Swedish rock 'n' roll bands, such as The Hives, The (International) Noise Conspiracy, Mando Diao and Hellacopters. The songs "On Top of Your World" and "With or Without Control" were released as singles. "Alright Alright (Here's My Fist Where's the Fight?)" is featured in Cheaper by the Dozen, Stormbreaker, New York Minute and on the Jackass: The Movie soundtrack.

Sahara Hotnights opened for The Hives before releasing Kiss & Tell on the RCA label in 2004. The tour sprouted from a relationship between Maria Andersson and The Hives' frontman Howlin' Pelle Almqvist. "Hot Night Crash" and "Who Do You Dance For?" were released as singles from the album. "Hot Night Crash" also appears on the soundtrack of Burnout 3: Takedown and Tony Hawk's Downhill Jam. The song "No Big Deal" is played in CKY4.

A new single entitled "Cheek to Cheek" culled from their fourth studio album What If Leaving Is a Loving Thing on Stand By Your Band Records was released via the band's MySpace site. The album was released in April 2007. Commenting on the lyrics on the album, songwriter Maria Andersson said: "If you read them you'll understand. The good thing with being able to write lyrics is that you can sit here and shut up about it."

The band's fifth album, Sparks, a covers album, was released in 2009. In 2011, the band released its sixth album, eponymously titled Sahara Hotnights.

During early 2019, band members put out pictures from the studio. A new single Reverie was released on 18 February 2022 and their seventh album Love in Times of Low Expectations was released on 6 May 2022 supported by a Sweden-only tour during the Summer of 2022.

In 2024, social media posts suggested an eight studio album is being worked on. In February 2026, they released their eighth album, No One Ever Really Changes.

== Members ==
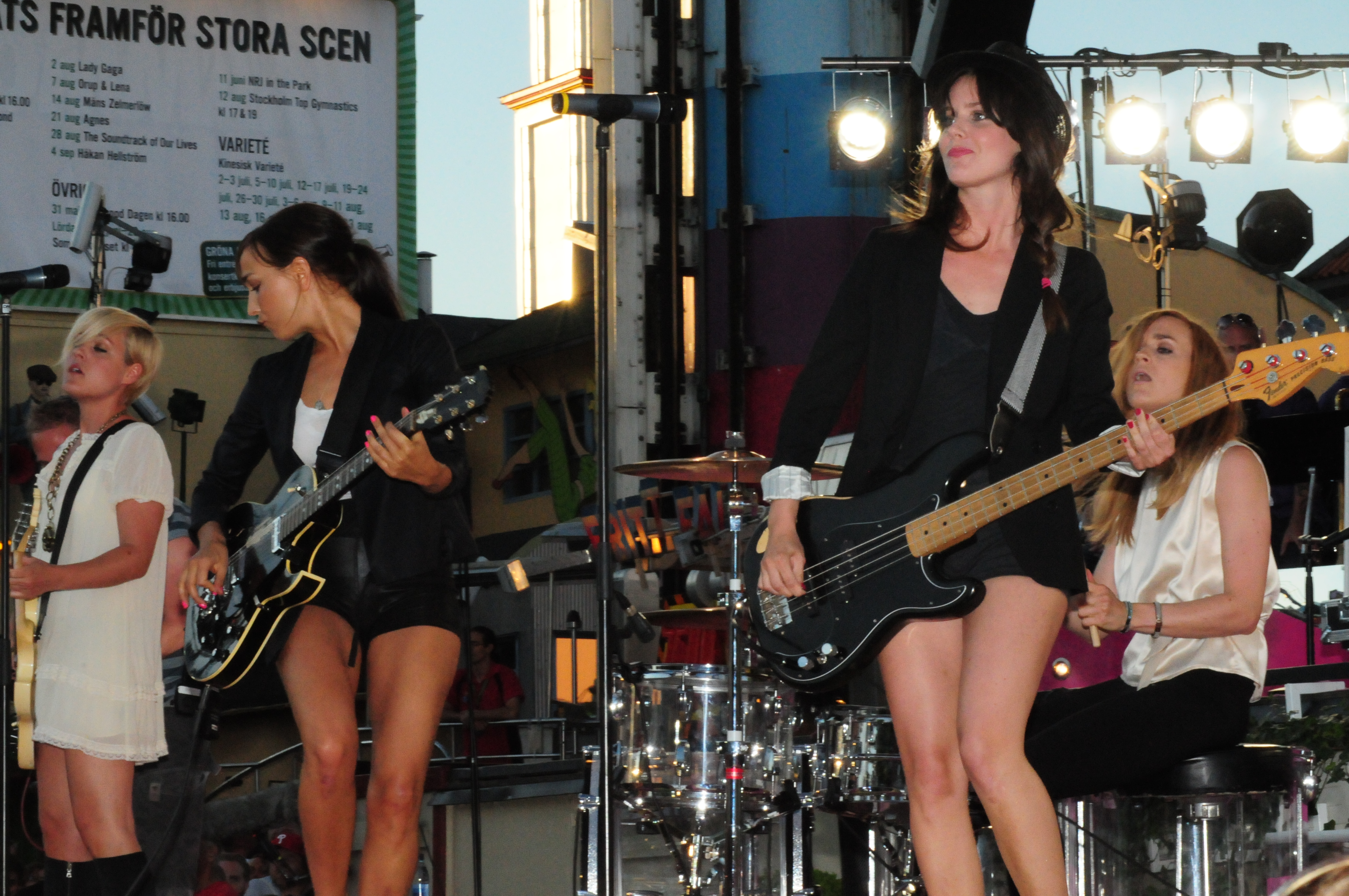
Sahara Hotnights performing in 2009

- Maria Andersson – lead vocals, rhythm guitar
- Jennie Asplund – lead guitar, backing vocals
- Johanna Asplund – bass, backing vocals
- Josephine Forsman – drums

== Discography ==
=== Albums ===
- C'mon Let's Pretend – 1999 (No. 15)
- Jennie Bomb – 2001 Continental Europe / 2002 UK/US (No. 2)
- Kiss & Tell – 2004 (No. 4)
- What If Leaving Is a Loving Thing – 2007 (No. 5)
- Sparks – 2009 (No. 2)
- Sahara Hotnights – 2011 (No. 6)
- Love in Times of Low Expectations – 2022 (No. 11 Sweden)
- No One Ever Really Changes – 2026 (No. 18 Sweden)

=== EPs ===
- Suits Anyone Fine – 1997
- Drive Dead Slow – 2000

=== Singles ===
Year	Single	Chart position
Year	Single	Sweden
1998	"Nothing Yet"	—
1998	"Face Wet"	—
1998	"Oh Darling!"	—
1999	"Push on Some More"	—
1999	"Drive Dead Slow"	—
2000	"Quite a Feeling"	—
2001	"Alright Alright (Here's My; Fist Where's the Fight?)"	1
2001	"On Top of Your World"	28
2001	"With or Without Control"	—
2004	"Hot Night Crash"	—
2004	"Who Do You Dance For?"	—
2005	"Keep Calling My Baby"	2
2007	"Cheek to Cheek"	10
2007	"Visit to Vienna"	49
2007	"The Loneliest City of All"	—
2008	"In Private"	7
2009	"Japanese Boy"	59
2011	"Oh's"	—
2011	"Vulture Feet"	—
2011	"Little Love Sorrow"	—
2022	"Reverie"	—
2025	"Always Like This"	—
2026	"Vanishing Girl"	—
