= Maria Andersson (singer) =

Swedish singer-songwriter (born 1981)

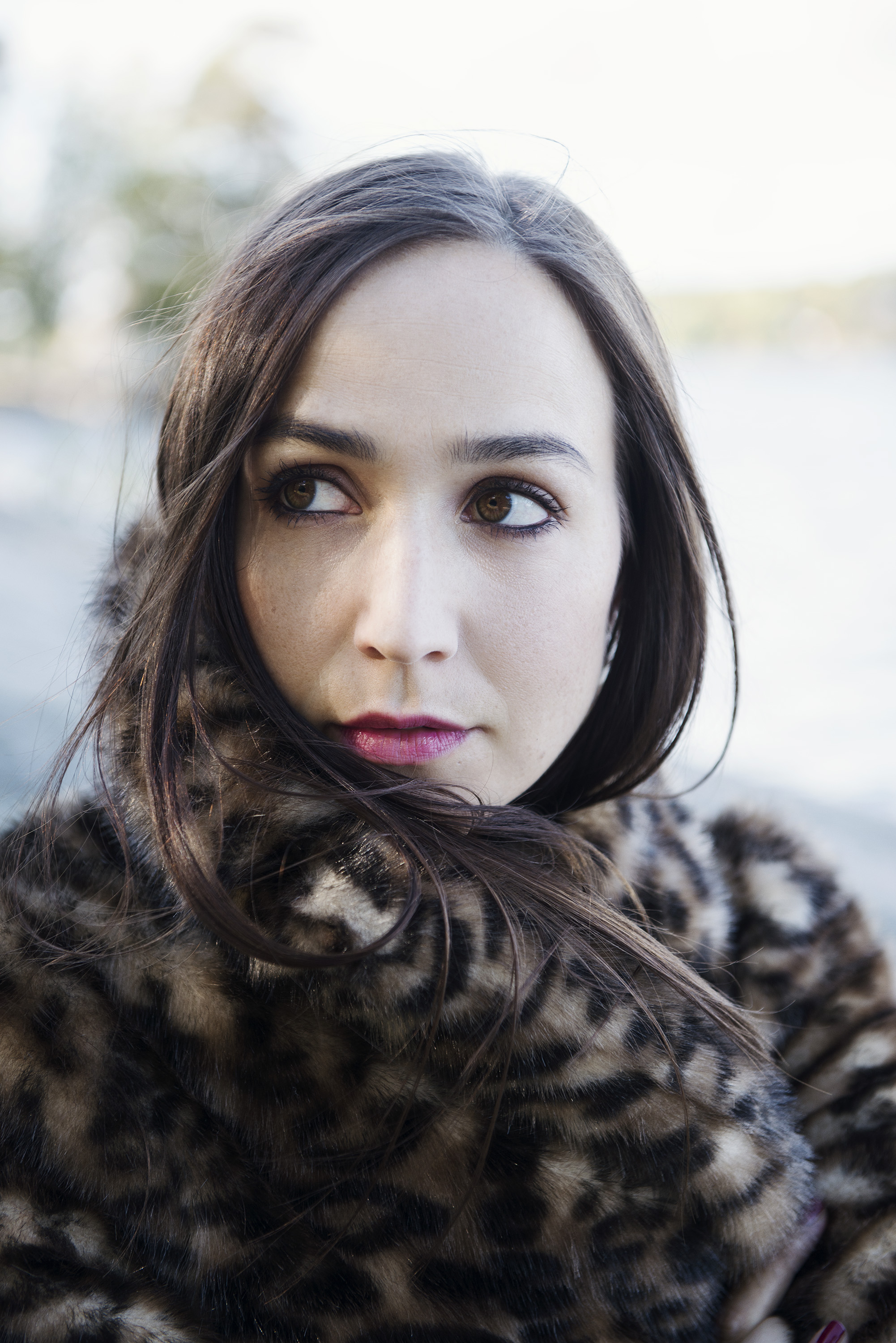
- Maria Andersson in 2016

Background information
- Born: Maria Elisabeth Andersson Andersson; 4 December 1981 (age 44); Västerbotten County, Sweden
- Genres: Rock; garage rock; indie rock
- Instruments: Vocals, guitar

Maria Elisabeth Andersson Lundell (born Andersson; born 4 December 1981) is a Swedish singer-songwriter. She is one of the four founders of the rock band Sahara Hotnights in which she was lead singer and guitarist.

== Sahara Hotnights ==
Andersson co-founded Sahara Hotnights in 1992, with whom she has released eight studio albums.

== Solo career ==
In 2012, Andersson was a permanent assistant/musician in Pluras kök.

In November 2015, Andersson joined the record label Woah Dad! to release music as a solo artist under the name Maria. On 29 April 2016, her debut solo album Succession was released, containing the single "End of Conversation".

== Personal life ==
Maria Andersson was in a relationship with Howlin' Pelle Almqvist from The Hives in the early 2000s. Since 2014 Andersson has been married to the artist Love Lundell, son of Ulf Lundell.

== Discography ==
Album

- Succession (2016)

Singles

- "End of Conversation" (2016)
- "Birches" (2016)
