= Josephine Forsman =

Swedish drummer

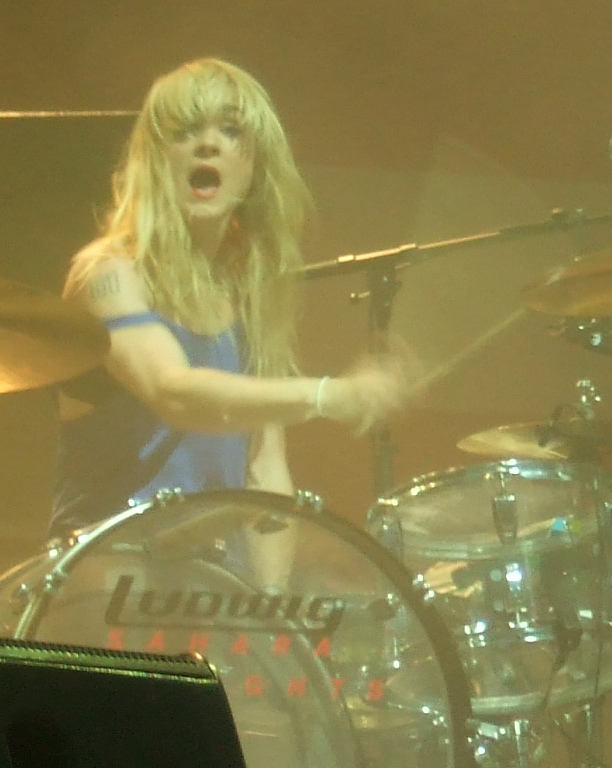
Josephine Forsman (2011)

Josephine Forsman (born 20 May 1981 in Robertsfors) is a Swedish drummer. She is one of the four founders of the rock band Sahara Hotnights.

She was also the drummer of the hard rock band Casablanca. She has played behind Swedish artists like Robyn, Orup, Per Gessle.

In 2012 she hosted the music series Låtarna som förändrade musiken where she interviewed and played drums/guitar with performers like Clyde Stubblefield, Tommy Ramone, Michelle Phillips.

In addition to drumming with Sahara Hotnights Josephine Forsman is working with the music organization LOUD Program in Los Angeles.

Josephine Forsman is endorsed by Ludwig Drums, Paiste Cymbals Vic Firth and Remo.
