= Per Sefastsson =

Swedish politician (born 1986)

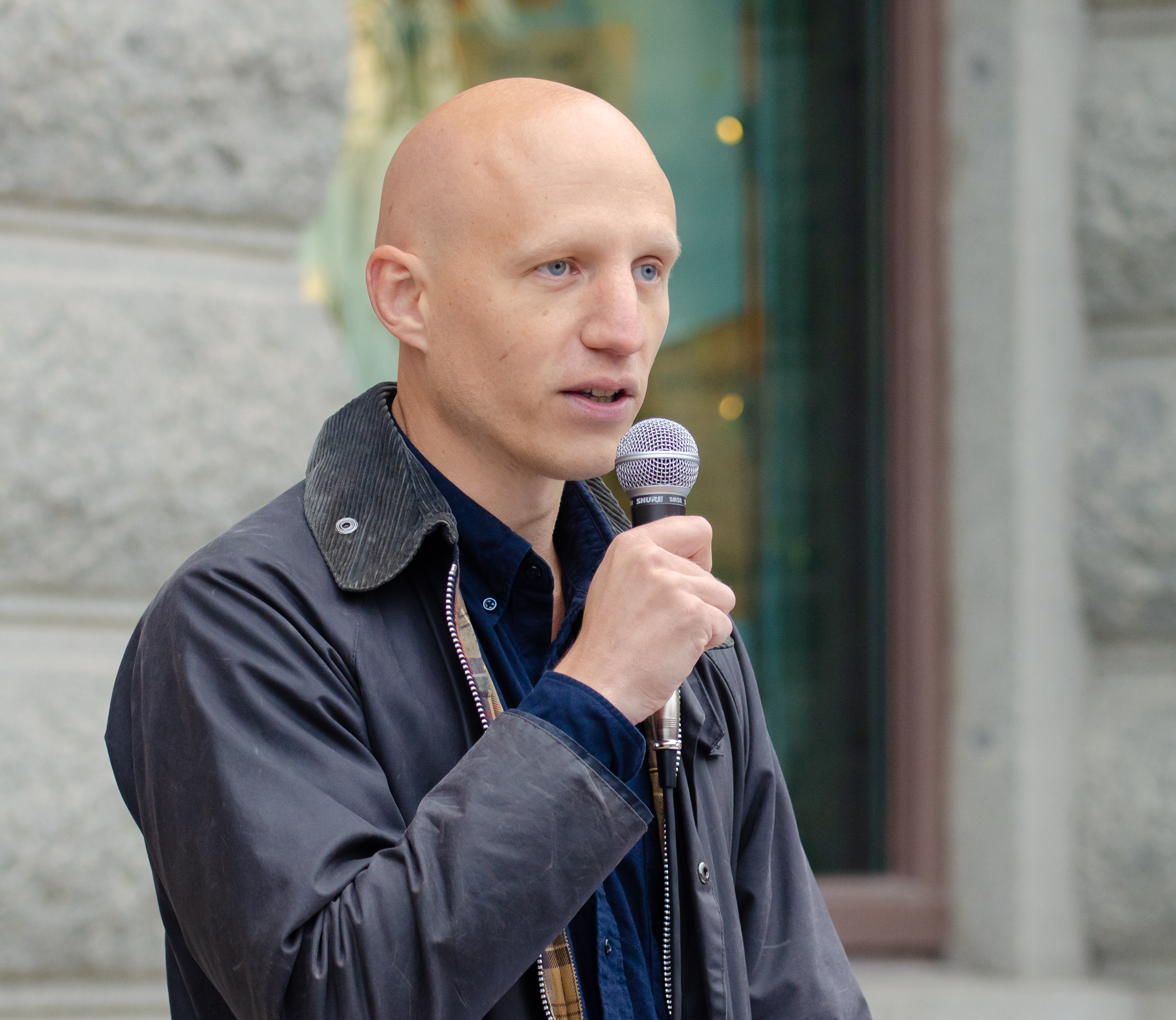
- Per Sefastsson speaking at Alternative for Sweden's meeting on Mynttorget in Stockholm on 9 August 2022

Secretary of Alternative for Sweden
- Incumbent
- Assumed office 19 September 2022
- Preceded by: Yvonne Lindholm

Personal details
- Born: Per Olof Sefastsson; 14 March 1986 (age 40) Sollentuna, Stockholm, Sweden
- Party: Alternative for Sweden (2018–present)
- Other political affiliations: Sweden Democrats (-2018)
- Spouse: Jenny Ribsskog
- Children: 2
- Education: Rudbeck
- Profession: Engineer

Per Olof Sefastsson (born 14 March 1986) is a Swedish engineer and politician, serving as party Secretary of Alternative for Sweden since 19 September 2022.

== Early life ==
Per Olof Sefastsson was born on 14 March 1986 in Sollentuna, Stockholm, Sweden.

== Political career ==
=== Sweden Democrats ===
He was previously politically active with the Sweden Democrats in Danderyd Municipality.

=== Alternative for Sweden ===
In June 2018, he visited the conference Development of Parliamentarism in Moscow together with Gustav Kasselstrand and Mikael Jansson.

He ran on 7th place in the 2018 Swedish general election.

He ran on 5th place in the 2019 European Parliament election in Sweden.

He was elected party treasurer at the party conference in November 2020.

In June 2022, it was announced that Sefastsson would run on 4th place in the 2022 Swedish general election and on 5th place in the 2022 Stockholm municipal election.
