= Jeff Ahl =

Swedish politician (born 1987)

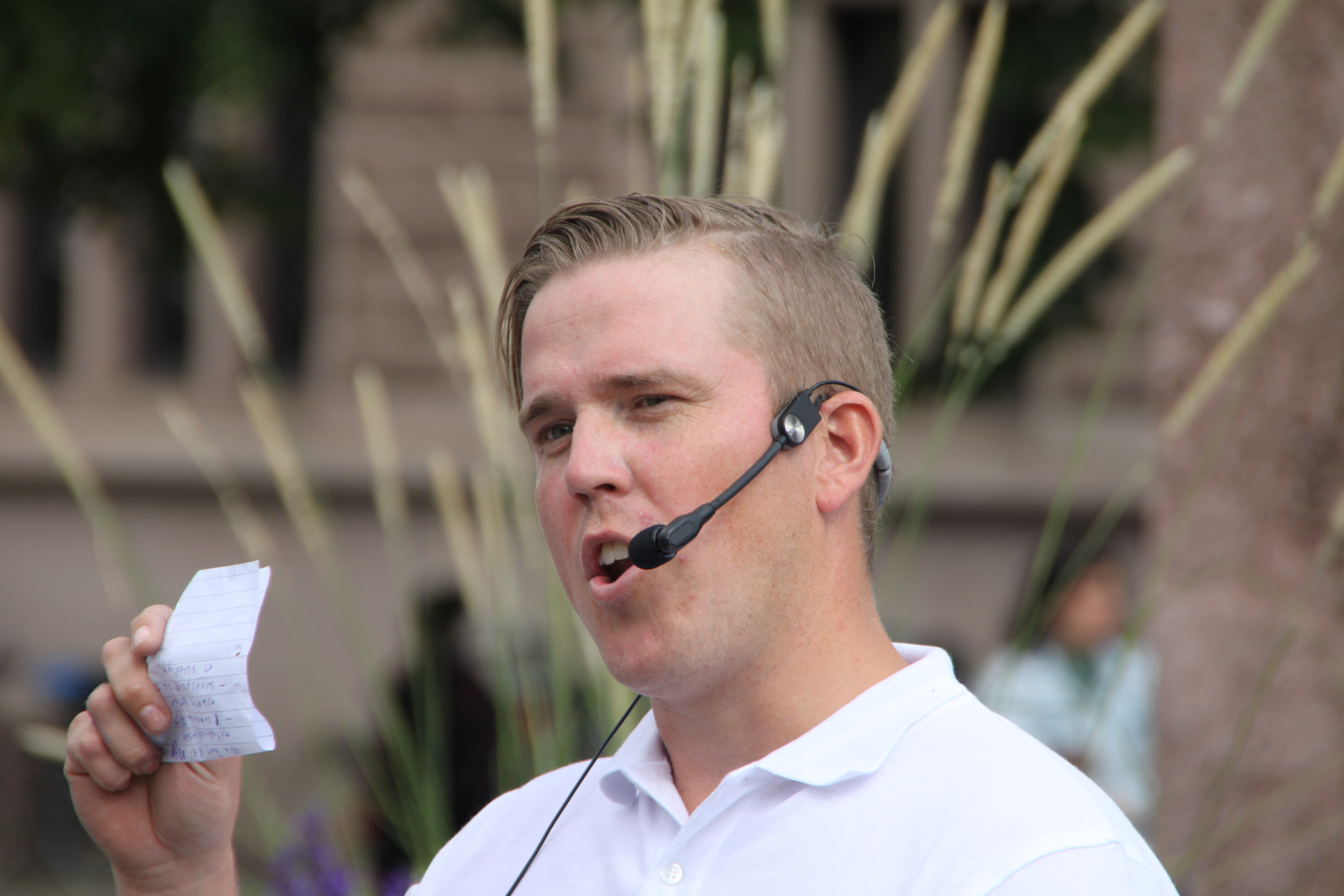
- Ahl in August 2018

Member of the Riksdag
- In office 29 September 2014 – 24 September 2018
- Constituency: Halland County

Personal details
- Born: Jeff Gustaf Ahl; 13 February 1987 (age 39) Tyresö, Sweden
- Other political affiliations: Sweden Democrats (until 2018); Independent (2018); Alternative for Sweden (2018–2023)
- Children: 3
- Education: Luleå University of Technology

Military service
- Allegiance: Sweden
- Branch/service: Swedish Army
- Unit: Norrbotten Regiment

Jeff Gustaf Ahl (born 13 February 1987) is a Swedish politician. As a former member of the Sweden Democrats, he served as member of the Riksdag from 2014 to 2018.

== Early life ==
Jeff Gustaf Ahl was born on 13 February 1987 in Tyresö, Sweden. In 1997, he appeared in the film Lilla Jönssonligan på styva linan in the role of "pojken med fribiljetter".

In 2013, Ahl started his education at the Luleå University of Technology where he studied the bachelor's program for politics and community development. Ahl is a former specialist officer at the Norrbotten Regiment.

== Political career ==
=== Sweden Democrats ===
Ahl joined the Sweden Democrats in 2011 and the following year became chairman of Sweden Democratic Youth (SDU) in Norrbotten. In SDU, he was part of the phalanx that challenged chairman Gustav Kasselstrand for power over the union. In 2014, he ran for the post of vice chairman on the alternative list topped by Henrik Vinge.

In 2013, Ahl became chairman of the Sweden Democrats in Norrbotten, a post he held until 2016.

In 2014, Ahl was elected to become a member of the Riksdag for the Sweden Democrats but changed party in March 2018 to the newly started Alternative for Sweden and thus became an independent in the Riksdag due to Swedish parliamentary rules on changing parties. In the 2018 general election — Alternative for Sweden did not pass the 4% barrier for representation in parliament and as a result — Ahl lost his seat in the Riksdag.

=== Alternative for Sweden ===
In Alternative for Sweden, Ahl was a member of the party board. In March 2023, Ahl resigned from the board along with Yvonne Lindholm and four other members in protest against Gustav Kasselstrand's leadership. In June of the same year, he also left the party altogether.

== Personal life ==
Ahl is a supporter of the sports club Djurgårdens IF.
