= Yvonne Lindholm =

Swedish politician (born 1966)

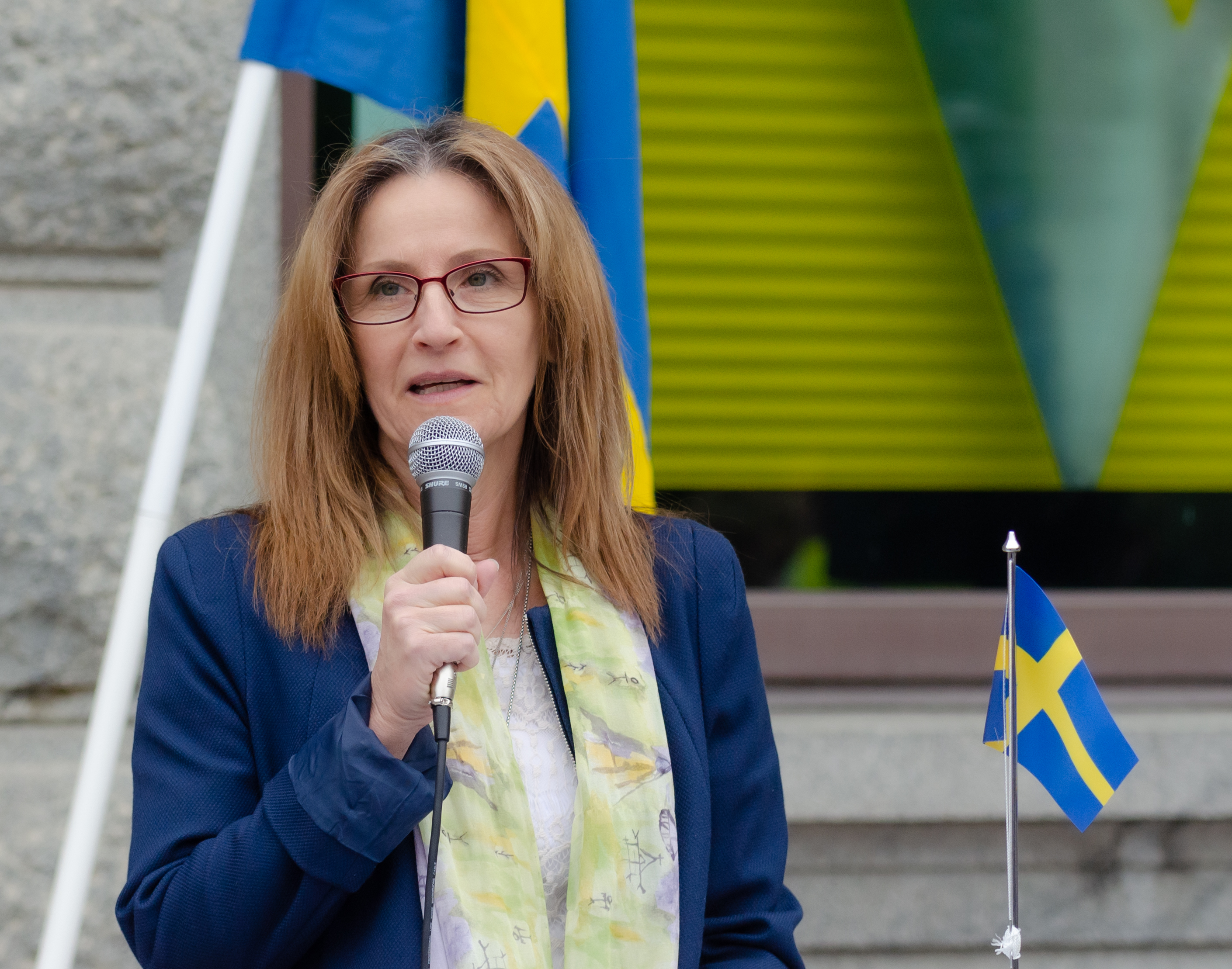
- Yvonne Lindholm speaking at Alternative for Sweden's meeting on Mynttorget in Stockholm on 9 August 2022

Secretary of Alternative for Sweden
- In office 28 November 2020 – 19 September 2022
- Preceded by: Jessica Ohlson

Personal details
- Born: Yvonne Anna Lucia Lindholm; 23 January 1966 (age 60) Stockholm, Sweden
- Party: Alternative for Sweden (2018–2022)
- Other political affiliations: Sweden Democrats (2013-2018)
- Spouse: Kim Lindholm
- Children: 5
- Profession: Businesswoman

Yvonne Anna Lucia Lindholm (born 23 January 1966) is a Swedish businesswoman and politician, serving as party secretary of Alternative for Sweden from 28 November 2020 to 19 September 2022.

== Early life ==
Yvonne Anna Lucia Lindholm was born on 23 January 1966 in Södermalm, Stockholm, Sweden.

== Political career ==
=== Sweden Democrats ===
She was previously politically active with the Sweden Democrats in Haninge Municipality.

=== Alternative for Sweden ===
She ran on 9th place in the 2018 Swedish general election.

She was elected party secretary at the party conference in November 2020.

In June 2022, it was announced that Lindholm would run on 6th place in the 2022 Swedish general election.

In March 2023, Lindholm resigned from the board along with Jeff Ahl and four other members in protest against Gustav Kasselstrand's leadership.

== Bulletin ==
In November 2021, it was revealed that Lindholm had approved personal loans to the newly founded online newspaper Bulletin.
