= Evelina Hahne =

Swedish politician (born 1995)

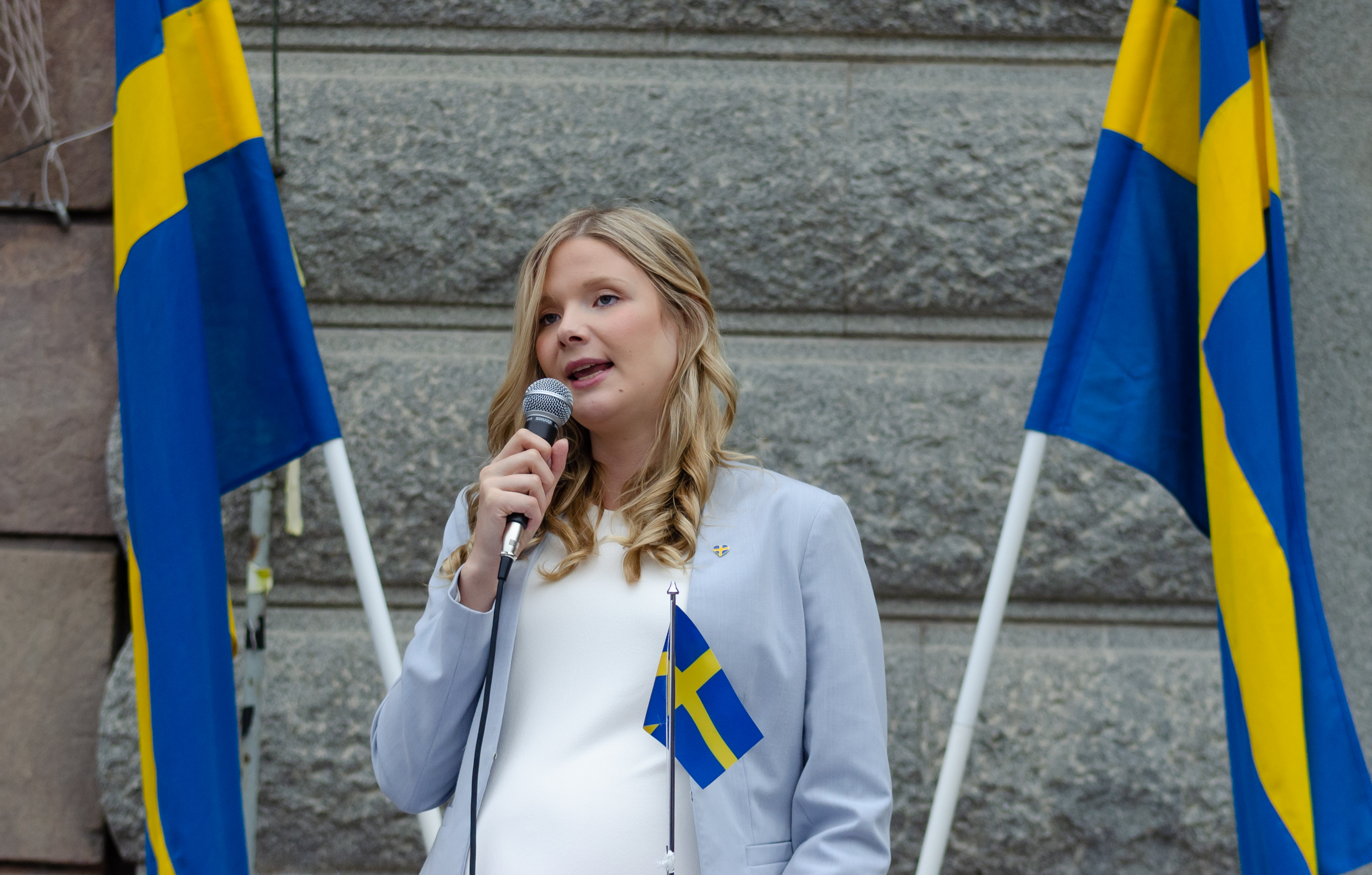
- Evelina Hahne speaking at Alternative for Sweden's meeting on Mynttorget in Stockholm on 9 August 2022

Personal details
- Born: Evelina Josefine Hahne; 12 July 1995 (age 31) Sollentuna, Stockholm, Sweden
- Party: Alternative for Sweden (2018-present)
- Spouse: William Hahne (m. 2020)
- Children: 3
- Education: Linköping University
- Profession: Engineer

Evelina Josefine Hahne (born 12 July 1995) is a Swedish engineer and politician for the far-right political party Alternative for Sweden, which advocates for forced “remigration” of immigrants.

== Early life ==
Evelina Josefine Hahne was born on 12 July 1995 in Sollentuna, Stockholm, Sweden.

== Political career ==
In 2022, she ran on 10th place in the 2022 Swedish general election and on 3rd place in the 2022 Stockholm municipal election.

=== Defamation lawsuit ===
In April 2022 Hahne was awarded 20 000 Swedish kronor in a default judgment by the Malmö District Court, after having filed a defamation lawsuit against a Twitter user who had described her as a 'nazi housewife'.

In 2022, she was allegedly discharged from the Home Guard because of social media posts that clashed with the values of the Home Guard.

== Personal life ==
On 21 November 2020, she married the former deputy leader of Alternative for Sweden William Hahne.
