= William Hahne =

Swedish politician

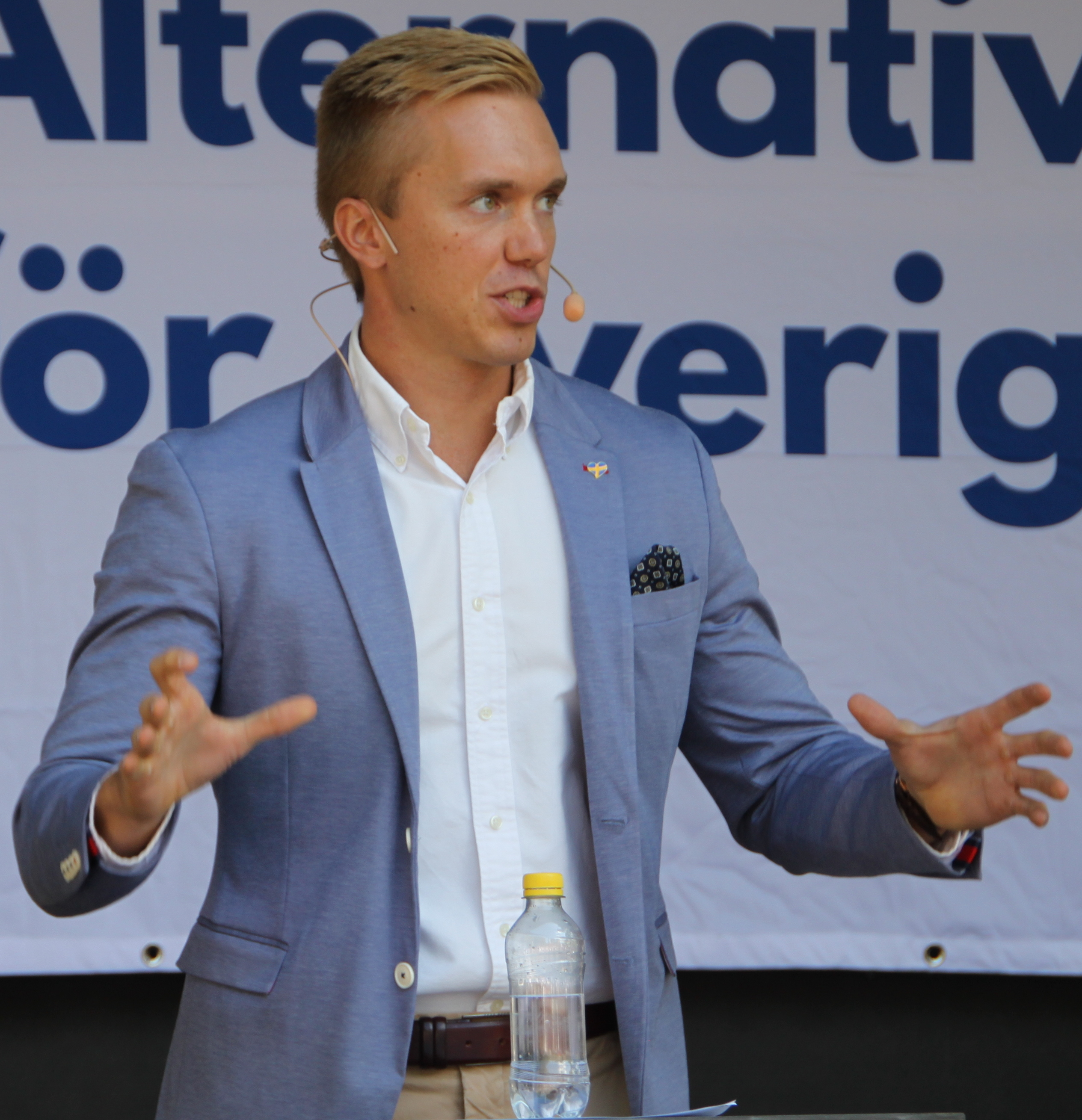
- Hahne in 2018

Deputy Leader of Alternative for Sweden
- In office 5 March 2018 – 23 March 2020
- Leader: Gustav Kasselstrand
- Preceded by: Party established
- Succeeded by: Mikael Jansson

Deputy Chairman of the Sweden Democratic Youth
- In office September 2011 – September 2015
- Preceded by: Gustav Kasselstrand
- Succeeded by: Adam Berg

Personal details
- Born: William Eric Viking Hahne; 19 April 1992 (age 34) Stockholm, Sweden
- Party: Alternative for Sweden (2018–2020)
- Other political affiliations: Sweden Democrats (until 2015)
- Spouse: Evelina Hahne (m. 2020)
- Children: 4
- Parent: Monica Tedestam Berglöw (mother)
- Education: Stockholm School of Economics; Uppsala University

Military service
- Allegiance: Sweden
- Branch/service: Swedish Army
- Years of service: 2012–present
- Rank: Sergeant
- Unit: Life Regiment Hussars

William Eric Viking Hahne (born 19 April 1992) is a Swedish far-right politician who was the Deputy Chairman of the party Alternative for Sweden. He was Deputy Chairman of the Sweden Democratic Youth (SDU) from September 2011 to September 2015. From November 2014 to April 2015 Hahne represented the Sweden Democrats (SD) in the City Council of Stockholm Municipality.

He resigned from Alternative for Sweden in March 2020 after revelations that he sold surgical masks during the COVID-19 pandemic at highly inflated prices. He currently work with e-commerce and lives with his family in Shenzhen, China.

== Political career ==
=== Sweden Democrats ===
Hahne was employed as press secretary for the Sweden Democrats in the Riksdag in 2010. He left the post in 2012, according to many because of an attention-grabbing debate article in Aftonbladet he had written together with Gustav Kasselstrand, in which they called on the SD to recognize Palestine as a state, defying the party's pro-Israeli stance in the Israeli–Palestinian conflict. In November 2012, Hahne and Kasselstrand were again noticed in a debate article, this time in Dagens Nyheter, where they criticized the party for the treatment of Erik Almqvist after the so-called Iron pipe scandal.

Hahne was expelled from the Sweden Democrats on 7 April 2015. Only hours after having left as deputy chairperson of the Sweden Democratic Youth, the Sweden Democrats announced that they would break the ties between the party and the youth league to form a new youth organization.

=== Alternative for Sweden ===
At the launching of a new party Alternative for Sweden in March 2018 Hahne was presented as its Deputy Chairman. In March 2020 he resigned from this position, after it was revealed that he had sold surgical masks for 249 SEK each – 759 percent higher than the normal prize, at the beginning of the COVID-19 pandemic in Sweden.

== Game development ==
Hahne is associated with a Swedish game development team called Nordic Empire Games, which in May 2022 released Acquitted, a computer game created in support of the actions of American citizen Kyle Rittenhouse during the Kenosha Unrest Shooting, with many far-right undertones present in the work.

== Military service ==
Hahne completed his basic military training in 2012 at the Life Regiment Hussars. Since then, Hahne has been working as an airborne ranger with the position of group commander in the same unit. Hahne holds the rank of sergeant and is also a trained paratrooper.
