= William Petzäll =

Swedish politician (1988–2012)

Member of the Riksdag for Dalarna County
- In office 4 October 2010 – 1 September 2012
- Succeeded by: Stellan Bojerud

Chairman of the Sweden Democratic Youth
- In office November 2010 – 7 February 2011
- Preceded by: Erik Almqvist
- Succeeded by: Gustav Kasselstrand

Personal details
- Born: William Nils Erich Petzäll; 26 August 1988 Filipstad, Värmland, Sweden
- Died: 1 September 2012 (aged 24) Varberg, Halland, Sweden
- Party: Sweden Democrats (2006–2011); Independent (2011–2012)
- Parent: Annika Petzäll (mother)

William Nils Erich Petzäll (26 August 1988 – 1 September 2012) was a Swedish politician, former member of the Sweden Democrats and Chairman of the Sweden Democratic Youth. At the 2010 Swedish general election he was elected to be the parliamentary representative for Dalarna County (Sweden Democrat MP).

In 2011, Petzäll discontinued his commitment to the political party that he had been serving up until that point. Until his departure from the Sweden Democrats, Petzäll was employed as a press secretary, in addition to his primary role as the committee leader for the Sweden Democrats' immigration policy program commission.

== Political career ==
Born in Filipstad, Värmland, Sweden, Petzäll was active in the Sweden Democratic Youth (SDU) and the Sweden Democrats.

He was a member of the municipal assembly in Borås, between the years 2006 and 2010. During a Baltic Sea cruise in 2009, Petzäll and several other SDU members were filmed singing white power songs. He later stated that the songs were sung ironically.

When the Sweden Democrats entered the Riksdag in the 2010 Swedish general election, Petzäll accepted a seat for the electoral district of the province of Dalarna. Later that year, on 20 November 2010, Petzäll was elected the chairman of the Sweden Democratic Youth.

== Drug abuse and death ==
On 6 February 2011, Petzäll was taken into temporary custody for public intoxication. He took some time off from the Riksdag for drug rehabilitation. He returned on 25 March and publicly promised to never drink again, but had a relapse three months later. According to Swedish newspaper Expressen, party chairman Jimmie Åkesson urged Petzäll to give up his Riksdag seat, but he declined. On 26 September, he announced that he would act as an independent politician focusing on drug addiction issues.

On 1 September 2012, Petzäll was found dead in his mother's home in Varberg after an apparent overdose.
