= Jessica Ohlson =

Swedish politician

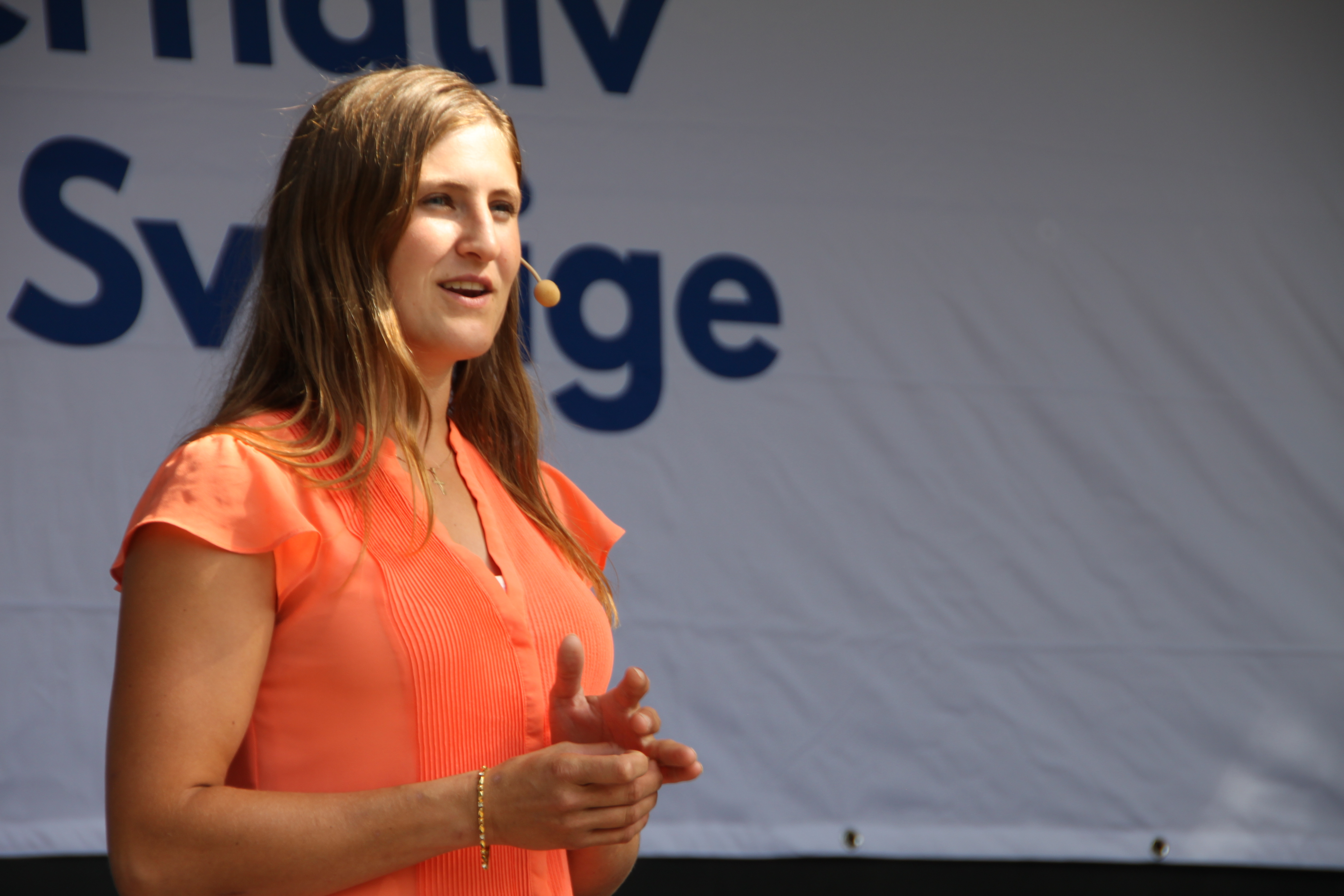
- Ohlson during an Alternative for Sweden meeting on Långholmen in August 2018

Secretary of Alternative for Sweden
- In office 5 March 2018 – 28 November 2020
- Preceded by: Party established
- Succeeded by: Yvonne Lindholm

Chairman of the Sweden Democratic Youth
- In office 12 September 2015 – 2017
- Preceded by: Gustav Kasselstrand
- Succeeded by: Constituency abolished

Personal details
- Born: Jessica Marie Susanne Ohlson; 12 June 1990 (age 35) Stigtomta, Nyköping, Södermanland, Sweden
- Party: Alternative for Sweden (2018–present)
- Other political affiliations: Sweden Democrats (2008–2015)
- Parent: Lars Ohlson (father)
- Education: Uppsala University

Jessica Marie Susanne Ohlson (born 12 June 1990) is a Swedish politician and lawyer. She was chairman of the Sweden Democratic Youth (SDU) from September 2015 to 2017 and served as party secretary for Alternative for Sweden from 2018 to 2020. Ohlson is an assistant lawyer at her father's law firm Lars Ohlson AB in Nyköping.

== Early life ==
Jessica Ohlson was born on 12 June 1990 in Stigtomta, Södermanland. Ohlson studied the science program at the high school in Nyköping and then the law program at Uppsala University.

== Political career ==
=== Sweden Democrats ===
Ohlson became involved in the Sweden Democrats in 2008 and held positions as union secretary and member of Sweden Democratic Youth. With the 2014 election, Ohlson was elected as a member of the municipal and county council in Uppsala.

Ohlson was considered to represent a more nationalist branch within SDU, and ahead of the union's congress in September 2015, she was highlighted as a candidate for the position of chairman by, among others, the outgoing Gustav Kasselstrand. At the congress, Ohlson was elected chairman of SDU, which led to the Sweden Democrats just a few hours later choosing to break ties with the youth association and instead start a new association under the name Ungsvenskarna SDU. In connection with the Sweden Democrats breaking with the youth union, Ohlson was officially expelled from the party along with five other SDU members. With this, Ohlson also chose to resign from her political assignments in Uppsala municipality and county council.

=== Alternative for Sweden ===
Between 2018 and 2020, Jessica Ohlson was party secretary in Alternative for Sweden. She was criticized because the combination of being both a refugee lawyer and party secretary in AfS was unacceptable.

== Personal life ==
Ohlson runs her own firm and a limited company called Min Galopphäst Sverige AB, with a focus on equestrian sports.
