= 2018 Swedish general election =

- 9 September 2018

All 349 seats in the Riksdag 175 seats needed for a majority
- Opinion polls
- Registered: 7,495,936
- Turnout: 87.1% (▲1.3 pp)
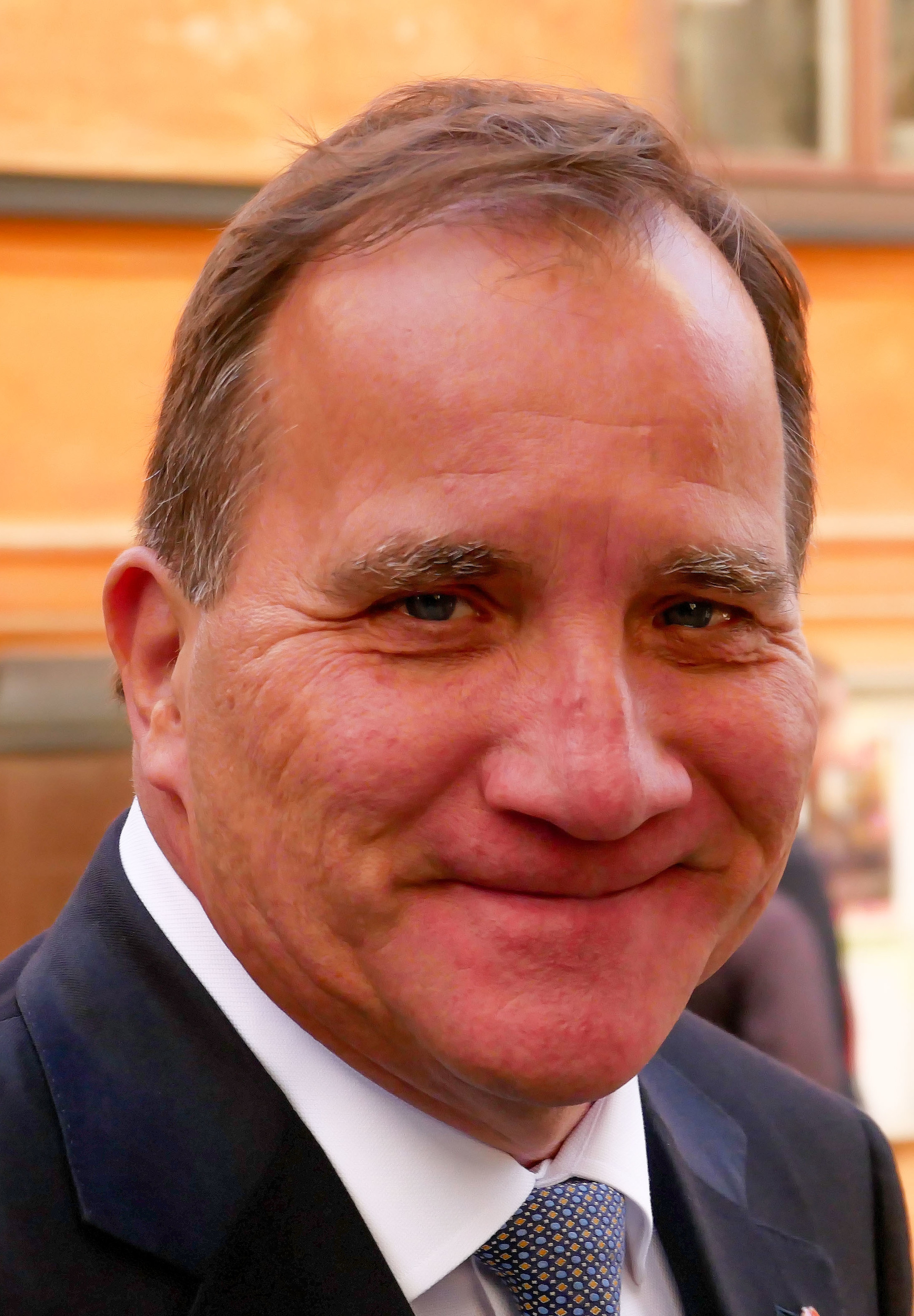

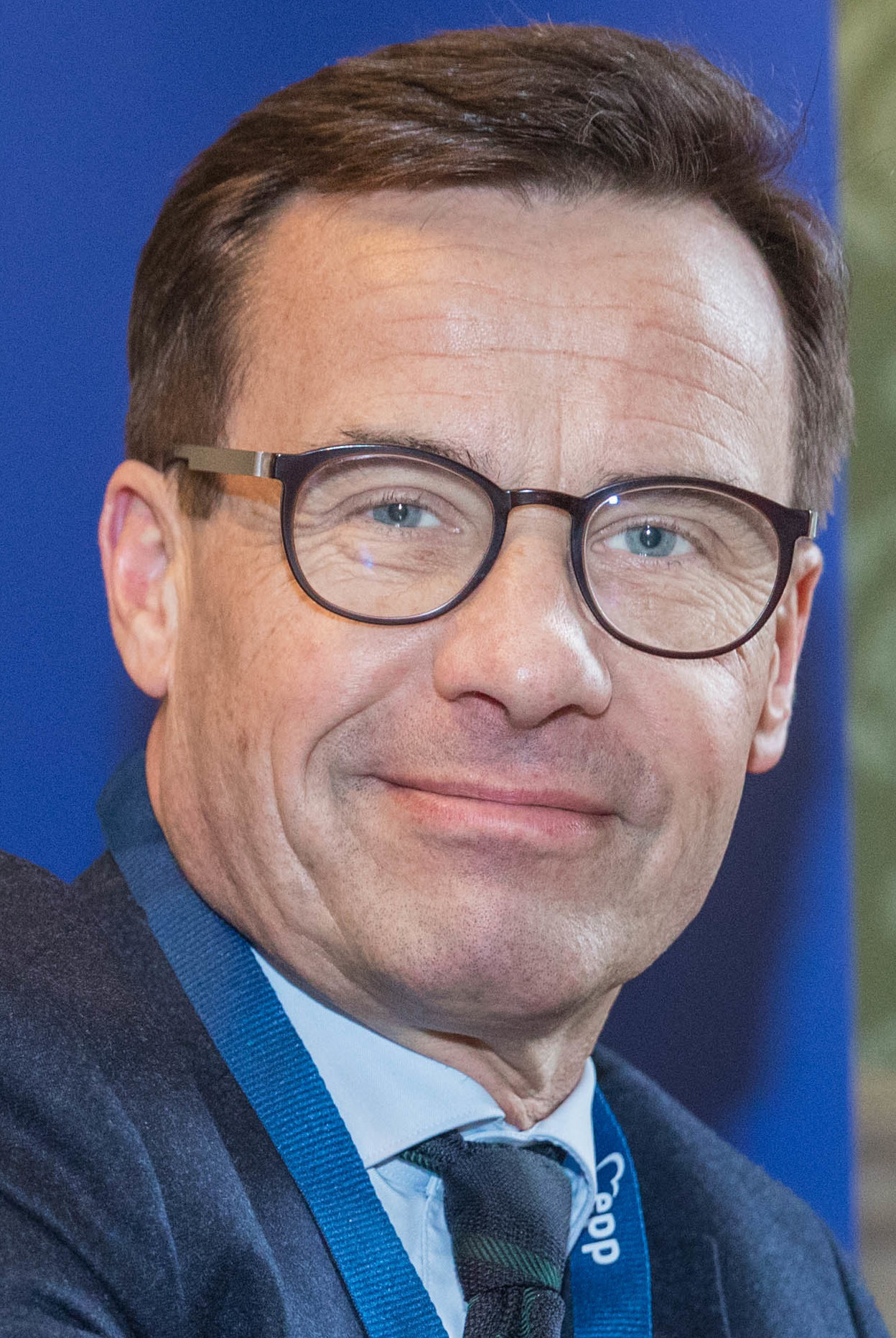

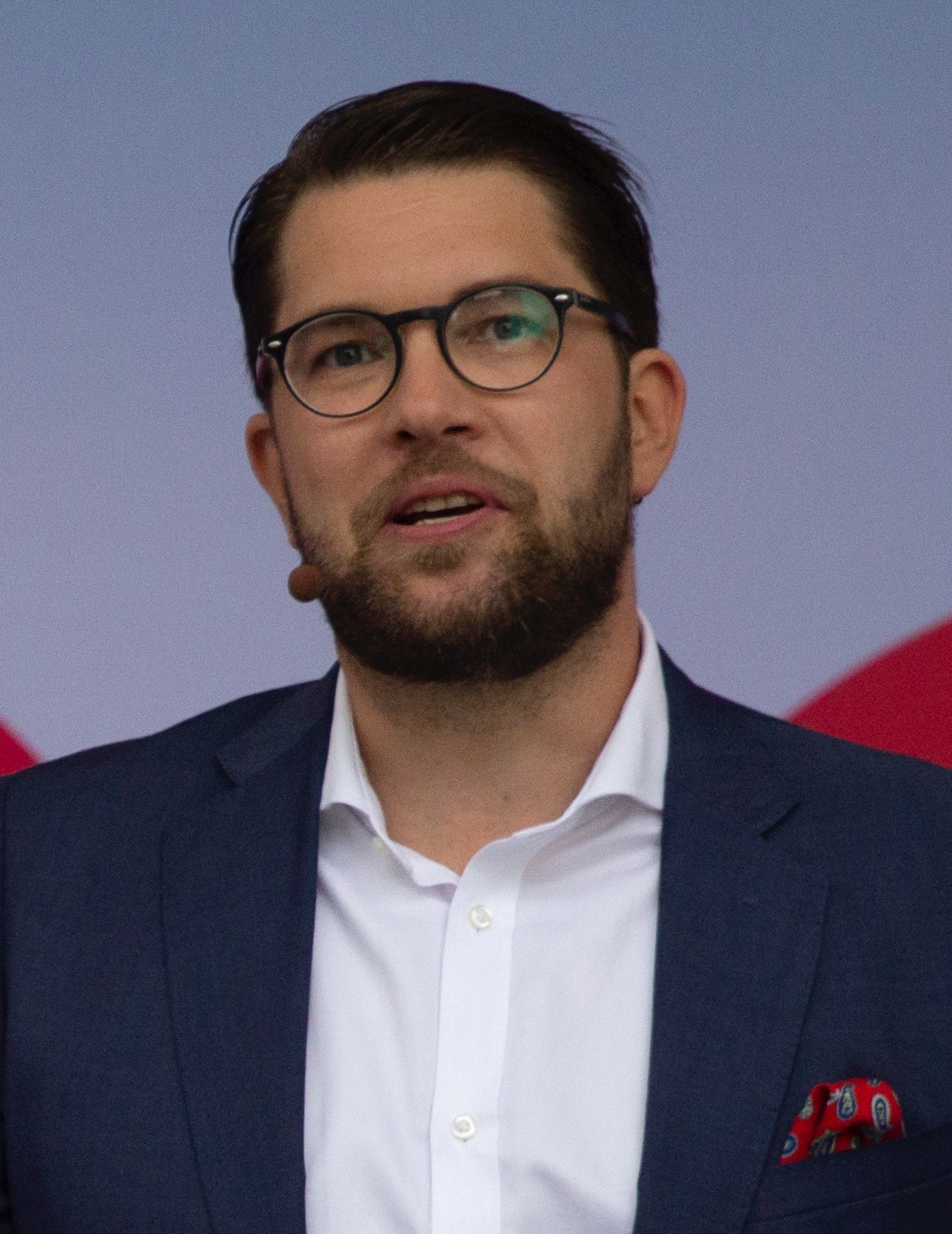

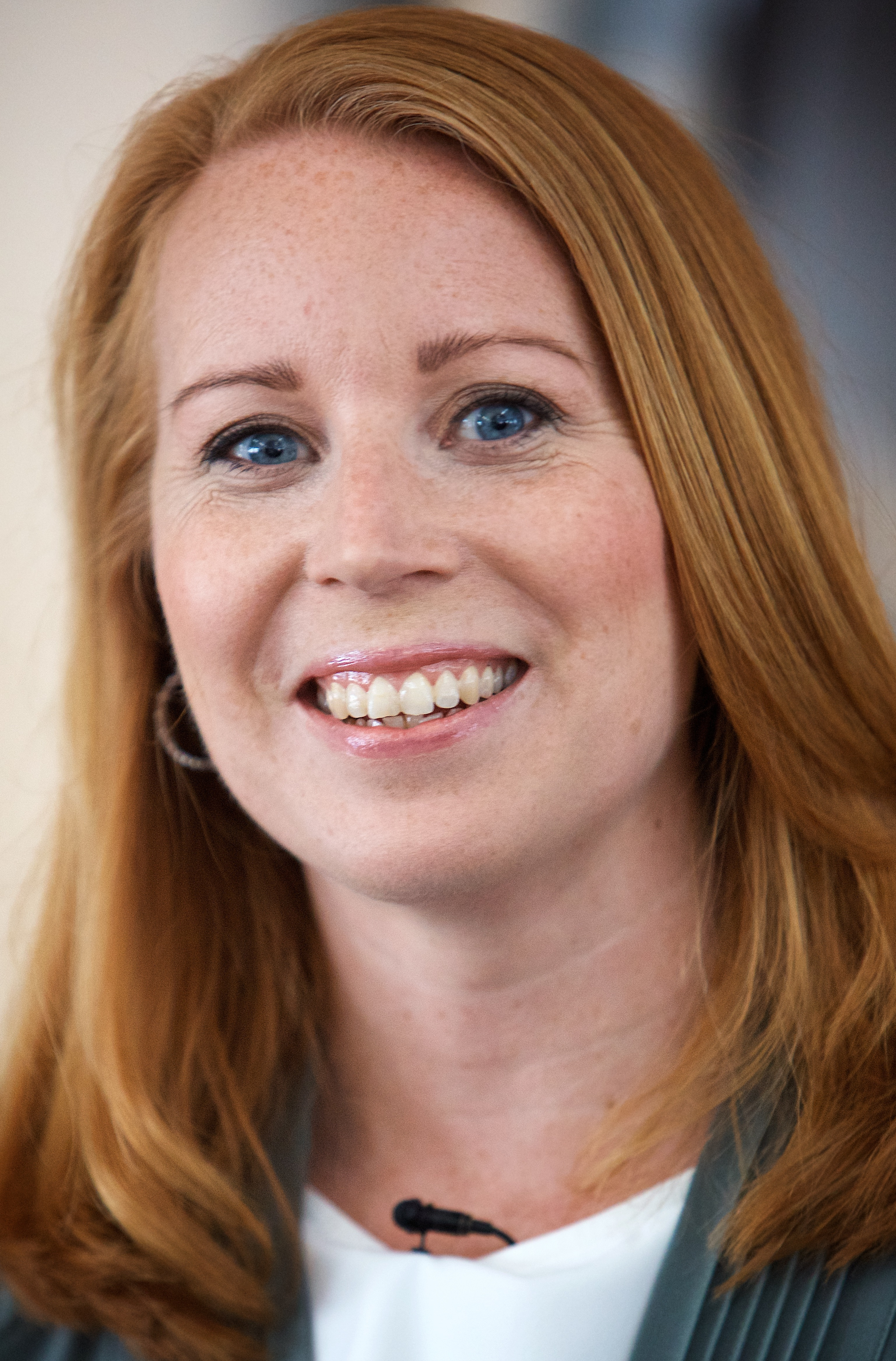

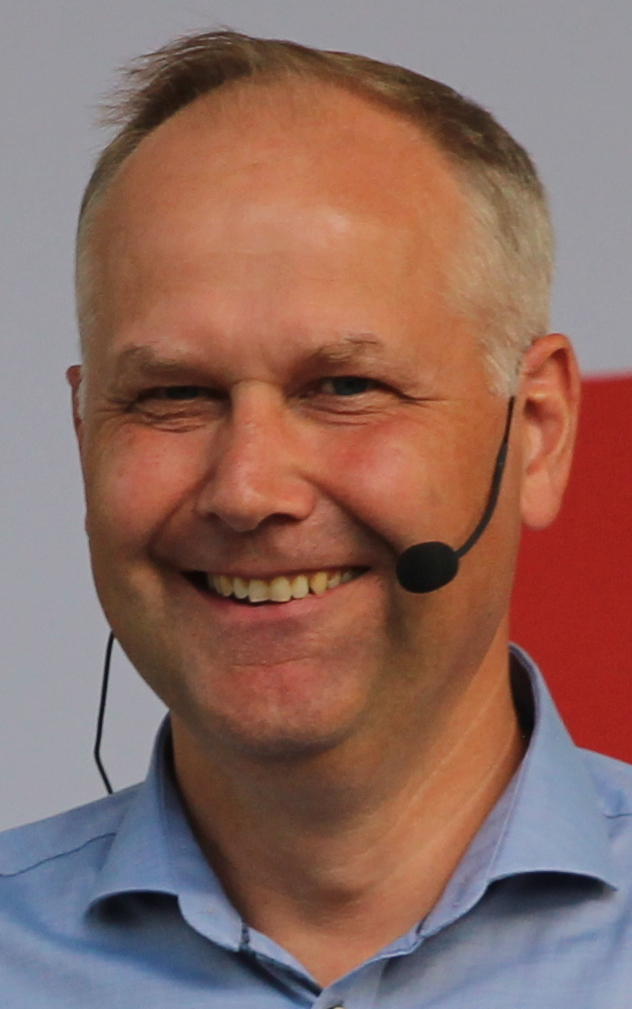

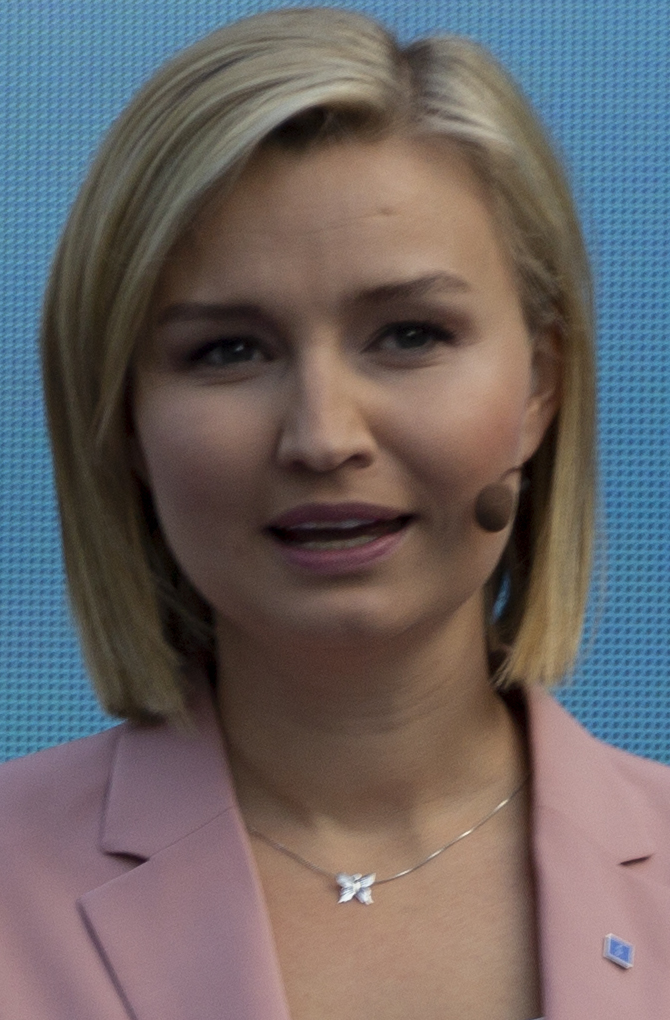

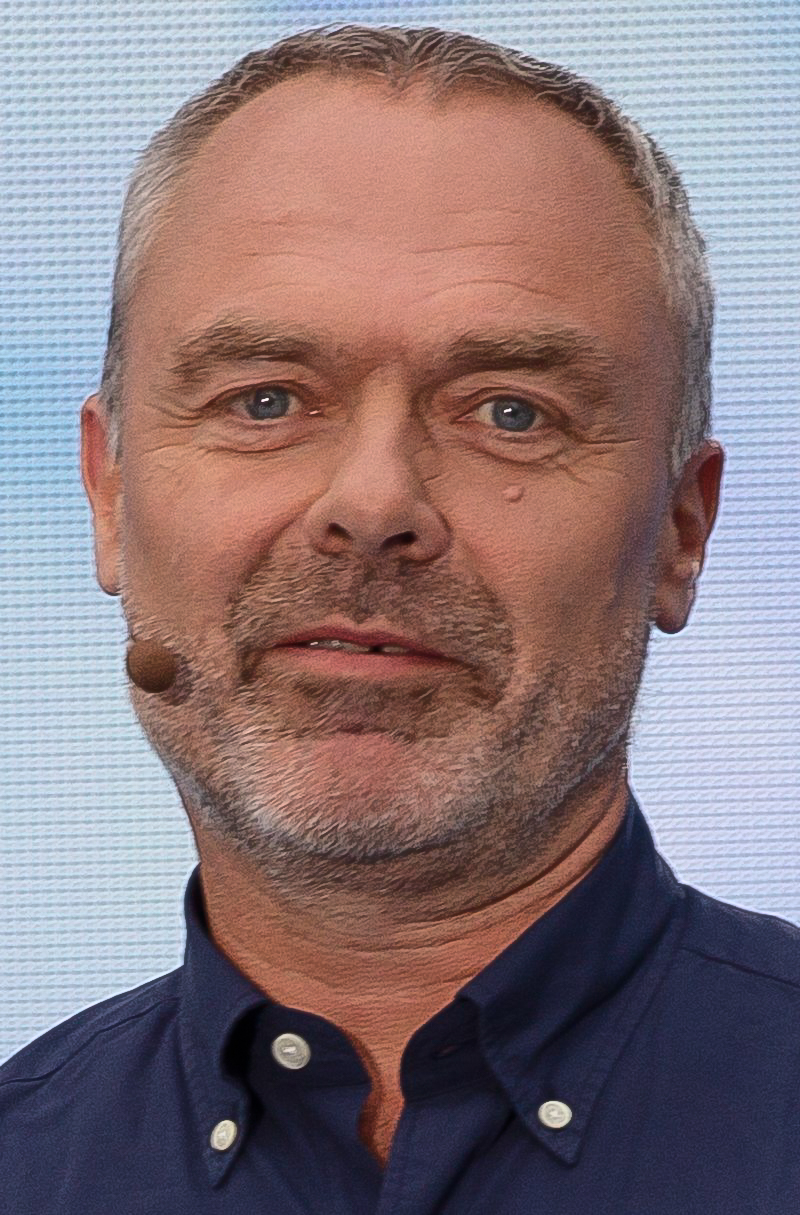

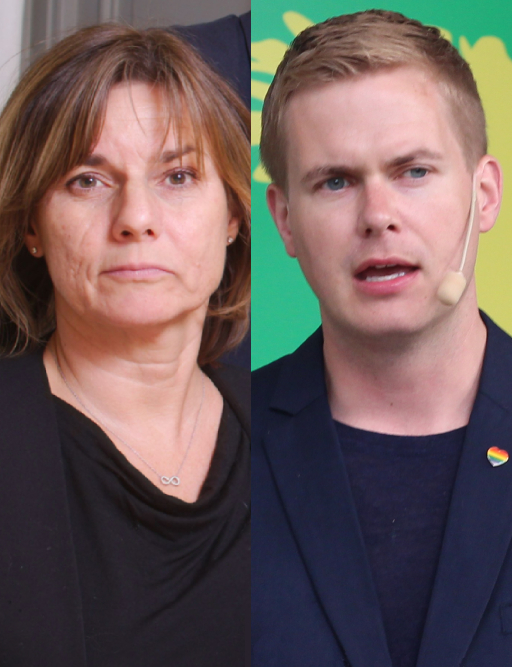
	First party	Second party	Third party
Leader	Stefan Löfven	Ulf Kristersson	Jimmie Åkesson
Party	Social Democrats	Moderate	Sweden Democrats
Alliance		The Alliance
Last election	31.0%, 113 seats	23.3%, 84 seats	12.9%, 49 seats
Seats won	100	70	62
Seat change	▼13	▼14	▲13
Popular vote	1,830,386	1,284,698	1,135,627
Percentage	28.3%	19.8%	17.5%
Swing	▼2.7 pp	▼3.5 pp	▲4.6 pp
	Fourth party	Fifth party	Sixth party
Leader	Annie Lööf	Jonas Sjöstedt	Ebba Busch Thor
Party	Centre	Left	Christian Democrats
Alliance	The Alliance		The Alliance
Last election	6.1%, 22 seats	5.7%, 21 seats	4.6%, 16 seats
Seats won	31	28	22
Seat change	▲9	▲7	▲6
Popular vote	557,500	518,454	409,478
Percentage	8.6%	8.0%	6.3%
Swing	▲2.5 pp	▲2.3 pp	▲1.7 pp
	Seventh party	Eighth party
Leader	Jan Björklund	Isabella Lövin; Gustav Fridolin
Party	Liberals	Green
Alliance	The Alliance
Last election	5.4%, 19 seats	6.9%, 25 seats
Seats won	20	16
Seat change	▲1	▼9
Popular vote	355,546	285,899
Percentage	5.5%	4.4%
Swing	▲0.1 pp	▼2.5 pp
Prime Minister before election
Stefan Löfven
Social Democrats
Prime Minister after election
Stefan Löfven
Social Democrats

General elections were held in Sweden on 9 September 2018 to elect the 349 members of the Riksdag. Regional and municipal elections were also held on the same day. The incumbent minority government, consisting of the Social Democrats and the Greens and supported by the Left Party, won 144 seats, one seat more than the four-party Alliance coalition, with the Sweden Democrats winning the remaining 62 seats. The Social Democrats' vote share fell to 28.3 percent, its lowest level of support since 1911.

The main opposition, the Moderates, lost even more support. The Sweden Democrats made gains, though less than anticipated. Regardless, the party became the largest in two constituencies in southern region Scania and topped the polls in 21 out of 33 Scanian municipalities and in 31 out of 290 municipalities overall. The voter turnout of 87.18% was the highest in 33 years and 1.38 percentage points higher than the 2014 elections. A record 26 out of 29 constituencies returned a hung parliament. 46% of seats were won by women (161 out of 349). The number has since increased to 47.2% (165 out of 349).

Following the elections, Prime Minister Stefan Löfven lost a vote of no-confidence on 25 September, forcing a parliamentary vote on a new government. In the meantime, his government remained in power as a caretaker government. Speaker Andreas Norlén nominated Moderate leader Ulf Kristersson to form a government on 9 November. However, Kristersson lost a vote to confirm him in office by a margin of 154–195. He was supported by his own Moderate Party, the Christian Democrats and the Sweden Democrats, despite having ruled out this scenario before the election, but the Liberals and the Centre Party, the other parties in the centre-right Alliance, were not willing to form a government reliant on the Sweden Democrats. On 15 November, Norlén invited Centre Party leader Annie Lööf to try to form a government, but she was unable to do so. Norlén then nominated Löfven, but following unsuccessful negotiations with the Centre Party and the Liberals he lost a confirmation vote 116–200 on 14 December.

Hours after the failed vote to confirm Löfven, Norlén announced that he would be meeting with representatives of the Election Authority regarding a potential extraordinary election. The Speaker also stated that he would be engaging in talks with the parties during the weekend and that he would present the next phase of the government formation process by the following week. Löfven was finally re-elected with a 115–153 result as prime minister on 18 January 2019 after the Social Democrats struck an agreement with the Greens, the Liberals, and the Centre Party; and after the Left Party reluctantly agreed to abstain from voting against Löfven. Due to Sweden's principle of negative parliamentarism this result was enough, as less than the majority of the parliament voted against him, while the supporting parties abstained. The result saw a breakup of the Alliance with the remaining right-wing parties aligning closer with the Sweden Democrats in parliament.

With the government being down to 116 seats (59 short of a majority), this rendered it the government with the lowest electoral support to begin a term during universal suffrage in Sweden and forced to approve several liberal policy platforms the government had campaigned against. With the right-wing opposition having 154 seats, to the coalition and confidence and supply agreements' 167 and the Left Party's 28, it still rendered a hung parliament even after the government formation, which exposed the government to high-profile losses in parliament. With the Liberals leaving the confidence and supply after a no-confidence vote in 2021, the de facto parliamentary blocs ended being 175 to 174 with the de facto majority for the red-greens being 0.1%. The metropolitan versus small town divide got stronger. With the 2021 constellations, the election saw Södermanland and Västmanland retroactively flip to the right for the first time during universal suffrage dating back a century, while also Blekinge went blue for the first time in the unicameral era. Meanwhile, the six largest municipalities had leftist majorities.

== Context ==
=== 2014 budget crisis ===
Just two months after having formed a minority government, Prime Minister Stefan Löfven announced on the afternoon of 3 December 2014 that he intended to make the formal arrangements for calling an extraordinary election on 29 December 2014 – the earliest date permitted by the constitution.

The election seemed to be necessary after Löfven's Social Democrat-led government lost a vote on the budget by 182 to 153, owing to the Sweden Democrats voting with the opposition, leading to a cabinet crisis. It would have been the first early election since 1958.

However, an agreement between the Social Democrats, the Greens, the Moderates, the Centre Party, the Liberals and the Christian Democrats was signed on 26 December 2014, outlining a series of conditions in order to ensure political stability until at least 2022. The agreement included two main provisions:

- The candidate for Prime Minister who gathered the most support would be elected. This would apply to both incumbent and new candidates for PM.
- A government in minority would be allowed to have its budget passed, by the abstention of opposition parties who had signed the agreement.

After negotiations between the Government and the Alliance for Sweden concluded, the snap election was called off on 27 December 2014. On 9 October 2015, following the Christian Democrats' departure from the agreement, the December 2014 agreement was dissolved. However, the Moderates, the Centre Party and the Liberals allowed the Social Democrats minority government to continue to govern.

== Campaign issues ==
In May 2018, the issues that the Swedish voters considered most important were immigration, healthcare and integration. In the days leading up to the election, the most important issue was the environment, followed by immigration and health care. With the polls showing that the Sweden Democrats could be kingmakers there was speculation over possible government coalitions.

Concerns about foreign influence in the election were raised by the Swedish Security Service and others, leading to various countermeasures.

The summer of 2018 saw several violent incidents occur, including the arson of over 100 cars on 15 August, which may have led 10% of Swedes to state that "law and order" was the key issue in September's election. While Sweden had faced sporadic gang violence in recent years at the end of summer break for students, violence in Gothenburg, Falkenberg and Trollhättan was said to be on a larger scale. Prime Minister Löfven referred to the August violence as if it was organized "almost like a military operation". In the following days, Twitter accounts connected to Russia tweeted about the fires, according to the Alliance for Securing Democracy intending to influence English-language readers. According to the Oxford Internet Institute, eight of the top 10 "junk news" sources during the election campaign were Swedish, and "Russian sources comprised less than 1% of the total number of URLs shared in the data sample." It has been claimed by domestic media that Non-Swedish media frequently emphasize the events in order to advance a narrative of a society in decay, along with some negative but restricted reporting around immigration, to describe great gains by the Sweden Democrats. This has been criticized as a "false narrative" and "misreporting" by domestic media.

== Contesting parties ==
=== Major parties ===
The Social Democratic Party (S; Socialdemokraterna) was the largest political party in the Swedish Riksdag, with 113 of the 349 seats. It was the major component of the incumbent Löfven Cabinet, in which it worked with the Green Party. Its leader Stefan Löfven had been Prime Minister of Sweden since 3 October 2014, and sought a mandate to continue his Löfven Cabinet.

The Moderate Party (M; Moderaterna) was the second-largest party in the Riksdag with 84 seats. It was the largest governing party under Prime Minister Fredrik Reinfeldt from 2006 to 2014. The party was involved alongside three other parties in the Alliance; all four sought to return to power together. Reinfeldt resigned as party leader after eight years as prime minister, and was succeeded as leader by Anna Kinberg Batra on 10 January 2015. Kinberg Batra's decision as the de facto leader to enter the budgetary procedure agreement with the left-of-centre cabinet saw sharp disgruntlement from some party districts. The Alliance had more MPs than the government parties, but still found itself in opposition. Owing to her low opinion polling numbers, Kinberg Batra faced internal pressure from multiple party districts and the Moderate Youth League to resign. She announced her resignation in a morning press conference on 25 August 2017. Former prime minister and Moderate Party leader Carl Bildt was suggested as a replacement after Kinberg Batra resigned; however, despite some party districts supporting his candidacy, he declined the offer. Ultimately, Ulf Kristersson was elected to succeed Kinberg Batra as party leader, during an extra Moderate party conference on 1 October 2017.

The Sweden Democrats (SD; Sverigedemokraterna) was the third-largest party in the Riksdag with 49 seats. In the 2014 general election the party increased its number of seats by 29, becoming the third-largest party. Its leader was Jimmie Åkesson, who was the longest-serving party leader. The other Riksdag parties had repeatedly stated that they would not cooperate with the Sweden Democrats in a future government. An extra general election was called after the Sweden Democrats gave its support to the oppositional Alliance budget (see section '2014 budget crisis'). After the proposed extra election was cancelled, the party advertised itself as the 'only opposition party' and in the following months it saw a sharp rise in support (see section 'Opinion polls').

The Green Party (MP; Miljöpartiet) was the fourth-largest party in the Riksdag with 25 seats. The Green Party was the minor component of the Löfven Cabinet, alongside the Social Democrats. It was the only Swedish party to have two spokespersons, Gustav Fridolin (since 2011), who served as Minister for Education, and Isabella Lövin (since 2016), who served as Minister for International Development Cooperation. This was the first time in Swedish history that the Green Party had its governmental record tested at an election.

The Centre Party (C; Centerpartiet) was the fifth-largest party in the Riksdag with 22 seats. It was a part of the Reinfeldt Cabinet from 2006 to 2014, and was involved in the Alliance. The Centre Party had been led by Annie Lööf since 2011. It was subject to public attempts by Löfven to become a cooperation party, but the party traditionally leans towards the Moderate policy positions and stayed within the Alliance after the 2014 election.

The Left Party (V; Vänsterpartiet) was the sixth-largest party in the Riksdag with 21 seats. Its leader was Jonas Sjöstedt. He had said that the party sought to participate in a future Red-Green coalition government. The Left Party did not support the Löfven Cabinet because it was not asked to participate in that cabinet following the 2014 general election, but supported its budget that was voted down on 3 December 2014. Following the budgetary agreement, the Left Party was what tips the left-of-centre minority into a larger minority than the Alliance.

The Liberals (L; Liberalerna) was the seventh-largest party in the Riksdag with 19 seats. It was a part of the Reinfeldt Cabinet from 2006 to 2014, and was involved in the Alliance. The Liberals had been led by Jan Björklund since 2007; his leadership was being increasingly criticized within the party. Opinion polls in the year after the 2014 election suggested that the party was falling significantly behind and struggling to recapture its previous level of support. Having been in charge of the school system and integration of migrants, it came under a lot of criticism owing to falling school results and increased segregation in immigrant-dominated suburbs.

The Christian Democrats (KD; Kristdemokraterna) had been led by Ebba Busch Thor since 2015. It was involved in the Alliance. Despite polling below the 4% electoral threshold for most of the time between the elections, the party saw a boost in support in the time period immediately prior to the election, guaranteeing its presence in the Riksdag (which was seen as essential in order for the Alliance to be able to form a government.). The party held on by a few tens of thousands of votes last time.

=== Minor parties ===
Parties with less than 4% of the vote do not get any seats in the Riksdag.

Feminist Initiative (FI; Feministiskt Initiativ), led by former Left Party leader Gudrun Schyman, was the country's ninth-largest party, and was represented in the European Parliament following the 2014 European election. The party received 0.4% of the vote in the election, compared to 3% in the previous election 2014.

The Pirate Party (PP; Piratpartiet) won representation in the 2009–14 European Parliament, but its subsequent runs for office had been less successful. It has been mentioned in some polls as the tenth-largest party, but appeared to be far from having a chance to break the threshold at a domestic level.

The Alternative for Sweden (AfS, Alternativ för Sverige) was a party with no representation in the Riksdag. It was formed from members expelled from the Sweden Democrats in 2015, and was led by Gustav Kasselstrand. The party received 0.3% of the vote, and thus failed to enter the Riksdag in this election.

== Electoral system ==
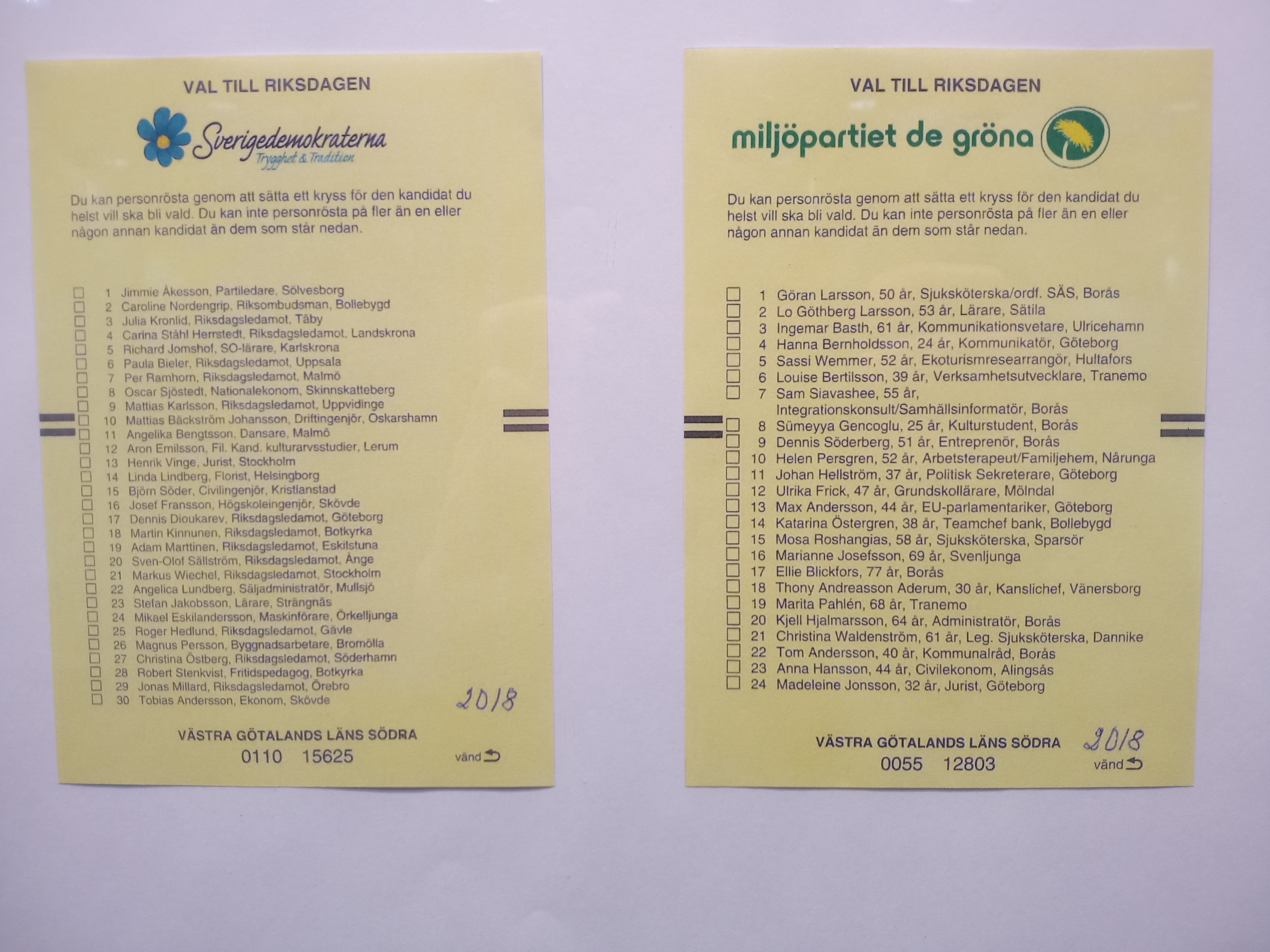
Ballot papers of Sweden Democrates and Green Party

The Swedish Riksdag is made up of 349 MPs, and all are elected through open list proportional representation on multi-member party lists that are either regional (most major parties) or national (Sweden Democrats). Each of the 29 constituencies has a set number of parliamentarians that is divided through constituency results to ensure regional representation. The other MPs are then elected through a proportional balancing, to ensure that the numbers of elected MPs for the various parties accurately represent the votes of the electorate. The Swedish constitution (Regeringsformen) 1 Ch. 4 § says that the Riksdag is responsible for taxation and making laws, and 1 Ch. 6 § says that the government is held responsible to the Riksdag. This means that Sweden has parliamentarism in a constitutional monarchy—ensuring that the government is responsible to the people's representatives. A minimum of 4% of the national vote is required for a party to enter the Riksdag, alternatively 12% or more within a constituency.

=== Vote secrecy and party-specific ballots ===
Election officials are responsible for party-specific ballot papers being present in the voting places for parties that have obtained more than one percent of the votes in the previous parliamentary election. If there is no access to the wanted party-specific ballot paper, a voter may cast a vote by writing in the party name of choice on a blank ballot paper. The voter generally chooses a party-specific ballot in the open and only then marks the ballot they chose in the voting booth.

The OSCE Office for Democratic Institutions and Human Rights sent an election expert team of two members to the 2018 general election to examine and assess this system, including in relation to questions of the secrecy of the ballot. The observers are to issue a report eight weeks after the election was held.

The neo-Nazi organisation Nordic Resistance Movement was reported shouting slogans and filming voters in several election rooms.

There were reports of missing party-specific ballots in some voting districts during the early voting phase. On the election day, the Swedish public broadcaster Sveriges Television reported that the ballots of the Sweden Democrats were missing for 2 hours in one Gothenburg district.

== Parties ==
The table below lists parties' representation in the Riksdag.

Name		Ideologies	Leader	2014 result		Pre-election
Name		Ideologies	Leader	Votes (%)	Seats	
S	Swedish Social Democratic Party; Socialdemokraterna	Social democracy	Stefan Löfven	31.0%	113 / 349	113 / 349
M	Moderate Party; Moderaterna	Liberal conservatism	Ulf Kristersson	23.3%	84 / 349	83 / 349
SD	Sweden Democrats; Sverigedemokraterna	Right-wing populism National conservatism	Jimmie Åkesson	12.9%	49 / 349	42 / 349
MP	Green Party; Miljöpartiet	Green politics	Isabella Lövin; Gustav Fridolin	6.9%	25 / 349	25 / 349
C	Centre Party; Centerpartiet	Liberalism; Agrarianism	Annie Lööf	6.1%	22 / 349	22 / 349
V	Left Party; Vänsterpartiet	Socialism	Jonas Sjöstedt	5.7%	21 / 349	21 / 349
L	Liberals; Liberalerna	Liberalism	Jan Björklund	5.4%	19 / 349	19 / 349
KD	Christian Democrats; Kristdemokraterna	Christian democracy	Ebba Busch Thor	4.6%	16 / 349	16 / 349
	Independents; Partilösa	—N/a				8 / 349

=== Independents ===
Before the election, there were eight members of parliament who had left their party, becoming independents. Four of them had left the Sweden Democrats to join the newly formed Alternative for Sweden.

Member	Party		Ref.
Member	From	To	Ref.
Patrick Reslow	Moderate Party	Sweden Democrats	
Jeff Ahl	Sweden Democrats	Alternative for Sweden	
Olle Felten	Sweden Democrats	Alternative for Sweden	
Anna Hagwall	Sweden Democrats	Alternative for Sweden	
Mikael Jansson	Sweden Democrats	Alternative for Sweden	
Pavel Gamov	Sweden Democrats	—N/a	
Margareta Larsson	Sweden Democrats	—N/a	
Hanna Wigh	Sweden Democrats	—N/a	

== Opinion polls ==
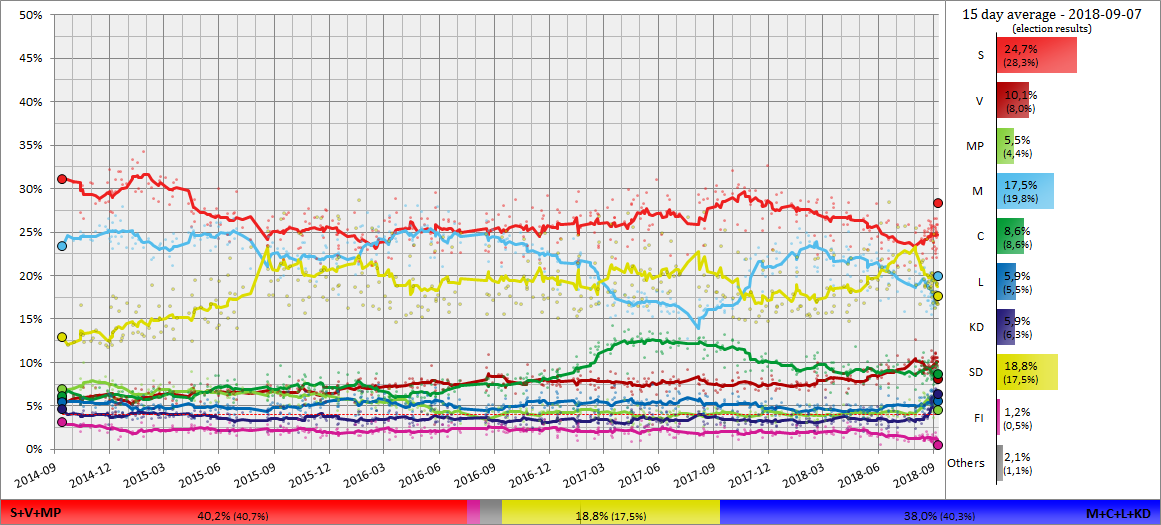

== Results ==

Party	Votes	%	Seats	+/–
By party
Swedish Social Democratic Party (S)	1,830,386	28.26	100	−13
Moderate Party (M)	1,284,698	19.84	70	−14
Sweden Democrats (SD)	1,135,627	17.53	62	+13
Centre Party (C)	557,500	8.61	31	+9
Left Party (V)	518,454	8.00	28	+7
Christian Democrats (KD)	409,478	6.32	22	+6
Liberals (L)	355,546	5.49	20	+1
Green Party (MP)	285,899	4.41	16	−9
Feminist Initiative (FI)	29,665	0.46	0	0
Alternative for Sweden (AfS)	20,290	0.31	0	New
Citizens' Coalition (MED)	13,056	0.20	0	New
Pirate Party (PP)	7,326	0.11	0	0
Direct Democrats (DD)	5,153	0.08	0	0
Independent Rural Party (LPo)	4,962	0.08	0	New
Enhet (ENH)	4,647	0.07	0	0
Animals' Party (DjuP)	3,648	0.06	0	0
Christian Values Party (KRVP)	3,202	0.05	0	0
Nordic Resistance Movement	2,106	0.03	0	New
Classical Liberal Party (KLP)	1,504	0.02	0	0
Communist Party of Sweden (SKP)	702	0.01	0	0
Basic Income Party	632	0.01	0	New
Initiative	615	0.01	0	New
Security Party (TRP)	511	0.01	0	New
Scania Party (SkåP)	296	0.00	0	0
Norrlandspartiet	60	0.00	0	New
Libertarian Freedom Party	53	0.00	0	New
European Workers Party (EAP)	52	0.00	0	0
NY Reform	32	0.00	0	New
Common Sense in Sweden	21	0.00	0	New
Our Country – Sweden	9	0.00	0	New
Reformist Neutral Party	4	0.00	0	0
People's Home Sweden	2	0.00	0	New
Yellow Party	1	0.00	0	0
Parties not on the ballot	588	0.01	0	–
Total	6,476,725	100.00	349	0
Valid votes	6,476,725	99.10		
Invalid/blank votes	58,546	0.90		
Total votes	6,535,271	100.00		
Registered voters/turnout	7,495,936	87.18		
Source: VAL
By alliance
Red-Greens (S+MP+V)	2,634,739	40.68	144	−15
The Alliance (M+C+L+KD)	2,607,222	40.26	143	+2
Sweden Democrats (SD)	1,135,627	17.53	62	+13
Other parties	99,137	1.53	0	–
Total	6,476,725	100.00	349	0
Valid votes	6,476,725	99.10		
Invalid/blank votes	58,546	0.90		
Total votes	6,535,271	100.00		
Registered voters/turnout	7,495,936	87.18		
Source: VAL

=== By constituency ===
Constituency	Region	Turnout	Share	Votes	S	M	SD	C	V	KD	L	MP	Other
Constituency	Region	Turnout	Share	Votes	%	%	%	%	%	%	%	%	%
Blekinge	G	88.5	1.6	104,514	31.4	17.3	25.2	6.8	5.5	5.7	4.0	2.9	1.3
Dalarna	S	87.6	2.9	188,027	30.7	16.7	20.8	10.0	7.3	6.1	3.6	3.3	1.5
Gothenburg	G	84.3	5.4	349,645	23.8	19.9	13.5	7.1	14.0	5.5	7.3	7.0	2.1
Gotland	G	88.8	0.6	41,129	29.8	16.6	12.7	17.2	9.0	4.1	3.7	5.0	1.9
Gävleborg	N	86.3	2.9	185,413	34.1	15.3	19.6	9.1	8.4	5.3	4.0	3.1	1.3
Halland	G	89.0	3.4	216,982	25.8	22.9	18.6	10.1	4.8	7.1	5.7	3.5	1.4
Jämtland	N	87.1	1.3	85,223	33.6	14.3	15.6	15.4	8.4	4.8	2.9	3.6	1.5
Jönköping	G	88.1	3.5	229,580	27.8	17.7	19.3	10.1	4.9	12.0	4.0	3.2	1.2
Kalmar	G	88.1	2.5	160,864	31.2	17.2	20.6	9.8	6.1	7.2	3.8	2.9	1.2
Kronoberg	G	88.2	1.9	124,570	29.6	19.2	20.3	9.4	6.1	7.6	3.5	3.2	1.2
Malmö	G	82.0	3.0	193,268	29.1	19.5	16.8	5.7	11.9	3.8	5.6	5.6	2.0
Norrbotten	N	86.7	2.6	166,678	41.7	12.8	15.8	7.1	10.7	4.6	3.2	2.8	1.4
Skåne NE	G	86.4	3.1	202,502	25.0	20.2	28.8	6.8	4.1	6.5	4.4	2.9	1.3
Skåne S	G	89.4	3.9	252,804	21.8	24.0	22.1	7.9	5.3	5.4	7.0	4.9	1.6
Skåne W	G	85.2	3.0	191,506	26.1	21.0	26.1	6.4	4.7	5.4	5.2	3.5	1.4
Stockholm (city)	S	87.3	9.4	611,206	23.8	21.9	9.8	9.1	13.1	4.9	7.9	7.7	1.9
Stockholm County	S	86.6	12.6	815,031	23.1	26.0	15.2	8.6	6.9	7.0	6.9	4.8	1.5
Södermanland	S	86.7	2.8	183,449	31.4	20.4	19.3	7.4	6.6	5.5	4.3	3.7	1.3
Uppsala	S	88.9	3.7	241,489	27.0	19.0	15.4	9.2	8.7	6.9	6.2	5.6	2.0
Värmland	S	87.3	2.8	183,966	33.9	16.4	18.0	9.3	7.0	6.3	4.4	3.3	1.3
Västerbotten	N	87.9	2.8	178,837	38.1	13.5	10.9	10.1	12.7	5.2	3.9	3.9	1.6
Västernorrland	N	87.8	2.5	163,001	39.8	13.7	15.6	9.9	8.2	5.4	3.4	2.7	1.4
Västmanland	S	86.7	2.7	172,719	31.4	19.2	20.1	6.7	7.1	5.8	5.5	3.0	1.3
Västra Götaland E	G	88.2	2.7	177,001	30.5	18.4	19.5	9.3	5.7	7.8	4.3	3.1	1.4
Västra Götaland N	G	86.8	2.7	174,573	30.6	17.6	21.4	7.9	6.3	6.5	4.7	3.6	1.4
Västra Götaland S	G	87.4	2.2	143,505	28.0	19.0	19.7	9.6	6.4	7.3	5.3	3.4	1.3
Västra Götaland W	G	89.6	3.8	243,278	24.2	21.8	18.0	8.2	6.8	7.7	6.9	5.0	1.4
Örebro	S	87.7	3.0	195,157	33.1	16.6	18.2	7.8	7.6	6.9	4.6	3.7	1.5
Östergötland	G	88.2	4.6	300,778	29.1	20.4	17.6	8.4	6.8	6.7	5.4	4.2	1.6
Total		87.2	100.0	6,476,725	28.3	19.8	17.5	8.6	8.0	6.3	5.5	4.4	1.5
Source = val.se

=== Seat distribution ===
The following is the number of constituency seats for each party with each asterix (*) indicating one of the seats won was a levelling seat

Constituency	Region	S	M	SD	C	V	KD	L	MP	Total
Blekinge	G	2	1	2						5
Dalarna	S	3	2	2	1	1	1*			10
Gotland	G	1			1					2
Gävleborg	G	3	2	2	1	1				9
Gothenburg	N	4	4	2	1	3	1	2*	2*	19
Halland	G	3	3*	2	1	1*	1	1	1*	13
Jämtland	N	2*	1	1	1					5
Jönköping	G	3	2	2	1	1	2	1*	1*	13
Kalmar	G	3	1	2	1		1			8
Kronoberg	G	2	1	2	1					6
Malmö	G	3	2	2	1	1		1	1*	11
Norrbotten	N	4	1	1	1	1				8
Skåne NE	G	3	2	3	1		1	1*		11
Skåne S	G	3*	3	3	1	1	1	1	1*	14
Skåne W	G	3	2	3	1		1*	1*		11
Stockholm (city)	S	8*	7	3	3	4	1	3*	3*	32
Stockholm County	S	10*	11*	7*	3	3	3	3	3*	43
Södermanland	S	3	2	2	1	1	1*			10
Uppsala	S	4*	2	2	1	1	1	1	1*	13
Värmland	S	3	2	2	1	1	1*	1*		11
Västerbotten	N	4	2	1	1	1				9
Västernorrland	N	4	1	1	1	1				8
Västmanland	S	3	2	2		1		1*		9
Västra Götaland N	G	3	2	2	1	1*	1*			10
Västra Götaland S	G	2	2	2	1		1*			8
Västra Götaland W	G	3	3*	2	1	1	1	1	1*	13
Västra Götaland E	G	3	2	2	1	1*	1			10
Örebro	S	3	2*	2	1	1	1	1*	1*	12
Östergötland	G	5*	3	3	1	1	1	1	1*	16
Total		100	70	62	31	28	22	20	16	349
Source = val.se										

=== Voter demographics ===
Voter demographics of the Swedish general election 2018, according to the Swedish Television's exit polls.

Gender and age

Cohort	Percentage of cohort voting for				
	Social Democrats	Moderates	Sweden Democrats	Other parties	Total
Females	31	19	12	38	100
Males	25	21	23	31	100
18–21 years old	22	24	12	42	100
22–30 years old	25	22	13	40	100
31–64 years old	27	20	19	34	100
65 years old and older	35	17	17	31	100

Employment

Cohort	Percentage of cohort voting for				
	Social Democrats	Moderates	Sweden Democrats	Other parties	Total
Gainfully employed	25	21	17	47	100
Unemployed	31	17	24	38	100
Permanently outside the labor market	36	7	30	27	100
Students	26	21	8	45	100

Occupation

Cohort	Percentage of cohort voting for				
	Social Democrats	Moderates	Sweden Democrats	Other parties	Total
Blue-collar workers	34	14	24	28	100
White-collar workers and managers	27	22	12	28	100
Farmers	22	14	16	38	100
Business owners and self-employed	13	30	24	33	100

Union membership

Cohort	Percentage of cohort voting for				
	Social Democrats	Moderates	Sweden Democrats	Other parties	Total
Blue-collar unions (LO)	41	11	24	24	100
White-collar unions (TCO)	32	18	13	37	100
Professional unions (SACO)	25	17	9	48	100

Education

Cohort	Percentage of cohort voting for				
	Social Democrats	Moderates	Sweden Democrats	Other parties	Total
Less than nine years of school	37	11	35	17	100
Compulsory comprehensive school	37	14	27	22	100
Secondary school	30	20	23	27	100
Tertiary non-academic education	28	19	24	29	100
College education	26	22	9	43	100
Post-graduate education	21	15	10	54	100

Public/Private sector employment

Cohort	Percentage of cohort voting for				
	Social Democrats	Moderates	Sweden Democrats	Other parties	Total
Public sector	34	15	15	36	100
Private sector	23	24	19	34	100

Foreign born

Cohort	Percentage of cohort voting for				
	Social Democrats	Moderates	Sweden Democrats	Other parties	Total
Raised in Sweden	28	20	17	45	100
Raised in Nordic countries outside of Sweden	26	11	36	27	100
Raised in Europe outside of Nordic countries	35	17	22	26	100
Raised outside of Europe	47	14	9	30	100

== Analysis ==
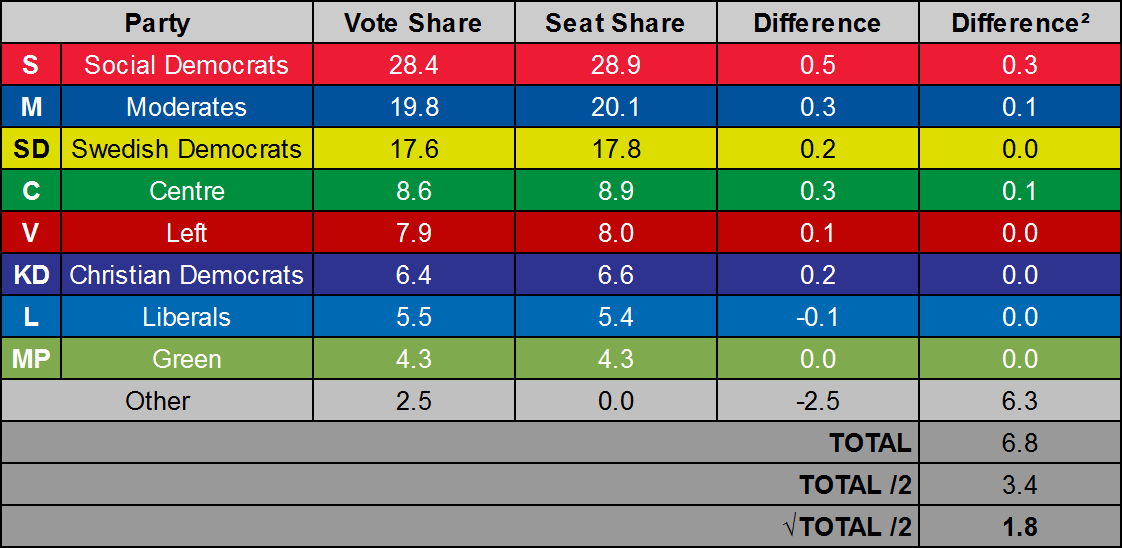
The disproportionality of the election was 1.8 according to the Gallagher index.

Numerous media sources noted the gains made by the Sweden Democrats, tying those gains to the simultaneous rise of right-wing populist parties across Europe. However, it was noted that the party did not grow as much as some polls had predicted. While the Social Democrats performed better than expected, the party still saw its worst result since 1908. According to The Guardian, the growth of the SD "upended perhaps western Europe's most stable political order", and other commentators made similar statements. According to Emily Schultheis of Foreign Policy, the SD won an ideological victory, as it "effectively set the terms for debate" and forced its rivals to adopt immigration policies similar to its own, and other reporters made similar observations.

The election did not result in a clear victory for any political faction. The Sweden Democrats performed particularly well in Skåne County, having the highest number of voters in 21 out of the county's 33 municipalities. SVT reported that at least 22 seats in 17 city councils would be empty as the Sweden Democrats won more seats than the number of candidates it had. The party received its first mayor, in Hörby Municipality. Despite the Social Democrats' worst result nationwide in decades, they overtook the Moderates in the latter's traditional stronghold of Stockholm city. Additionally, the Social Democrats and the Left Party saw an increase in the number of votes cast in that constituency while the Moderates lost votes; consequently, the Red-Green bloc also overtook the Alliance in the constituency.

== Government formation ==
Possible majorities in the Riksdag	Seats
Total seats	349
Absolute majority (175 or more seats)
M-SD-C-KD-L	205
S-C-V-L-MP	195
No majority (174 or fewer seats)
M-SD-KD-L	174
S-C-L-MP	167
M-SD-KD	154
S-V-MP	144
M-C-KD-L	143
S-MP	116

The election resulted in a hung parliament, with the red-green and centre-right coalitions each holding about 40% of the seats, and the Sweden Democrats holding the remainder.

Prime Minister Stefan Löfven lost the motion of no confidence against him and his cabinet on 25 September 2018, with 142 members of parliament voting to retain Löfven's cabinet and 204 voting against. This triggered a constitutional procedure wherein the Riksdag is given four chances to vote on a new Prime Minister. If the Riksdag failed all four attempts to elect a new Prime Minister, a snap election would be mandatory.

Party negotiations for forming a new government commenced on 27 September, but the deadlock remained as neither Löfven nor Kristersson could construct a stable coalition. On 14 November, Kristersson was formally nominated as PM, but lost the confidence vote when the Centre and Liberal parties refused to back him, as they were unwilling to work in a government that relied on the Sweden Democrats. The vote was historical, as it was the first time a candidate for Prime Minister was rejected by the Riksdag since the abolition of the bicameral legislature in 1971.

After continued, unfruitful negotiations, Speaker Norlén nominated Löfven to be re-appointed Prime Minister on 12 December. Though the Centre and Liberal parties were initially willing to work with him in securing a coalition, talks broke down days before the vote due to disagreements with the budget, and thus Löfven too lost his confidence vote two days later. On the same day that Löfven was nominated, the Riksdag rejected the caretaker government's provisional budget, and instead passed a competing budget designed by the Moderates and Christian Democrats.

Norlén stated after the vote that he would restart negotiations between the parties, while at the same time preparing for the possibility of a snap election. Norlén then created a finalized timeline for forming a government, and urged Kristersson and Löfven to find a compromise. Without nominating a new candidate, he set the next vote for a prime minister initially for 16 January (but later postponed to 18 January owing to differences between the Social Democrats and the Left Party), and a final vote on 23 January if the first vote would fail. If neither vote had succeeded, a snap election would have been called immediately, scheduled to take place on 21 April.

On 11 January 2019, a deal was struck between the Social Democrats, the Greens, the Centre Party, and the Liberals to allow Löfven to continue governing. However, over the next few days, senior officials of the Left Party expressed concern and were leaning towards voting against the proposed government and instead called on Löfven to continue negotiations with them. On 16 January, Sjöstedt agreed to abstain from voting against Löfven. On 18 January, Löfven was formally reelected with 192 yes votes and abstentions.
