= Olle Felten =

Swedish politician (born 1953)

Member of the Riksdag
- In office 2014–2018
- Constituency: Södermanland County

Personal details
- Born: Kent Olle Felten; 27 October 1953 (age 72) Malmö, Sweden
- Party: Alternative for Sweden (2018–present)
- Other political affiliations: Moderate; Sweden Democrats

Kent Olle Felten (born 28 October 1953) is a Swedish politician and former member of parliament in the Riksdag for the Sweden Democrats and then Alternative for Sweden.

Felten is an entrepreneur in Norrköping. He was a member of the Moderate Party before joining the Sweden Democrats. He served as a councilor and a member of the SD's executive board in Vadstena municipality and was also a member of the City Council of Norrköping Municipality. Felten was elected to parliament as a Sweden Democrats MP during the 2014 Swedish general election.

Felten announced in March 2018 in a press conference in the Riksdag that he had left the Sweden Democrats and joined the new Alternative for Sweden (AfS) party founded by former members of the SD. Felten was subsequently expelled from the SD for both his decision to join AfS and after it also came to light he had links with "right-wing extremists and racists." He spent the rest of his term in the Riksdag as an independent due to Swedish parliamentary rules on switching allegiances but announced his intention to run for the AfS party in 2018. Felten was ultimately unsuccessful and lost his seat when AfS did not gain enough votes for representation.
