= Sweden Democratic Youth =

Former youth wing of the Sweden Democrats

Sweden Democratic Youth Sverigedemokratisk ungdom
- Chairperson: Jessica Ohlson
- Founded: 1993/1998
- Dissolved: 2015
- Succeeded by: Young Swedes SDU (de jure); Alternative for Sweden (de facto)
- Headquarters: Riksgatan 1, Stockholm
- Ideology: Swedish nationalism Ultranationalism; National conservatism Euroscepticism; Anti-immigration
- Mother party: Sweden Democrats (until 2015)
- Newspaper: SDU-bulletin
- Website: www.sverigedemokratiskungdom.se

Sweden Democratic Youth (Swedish: Sverigedemokratisk Ungdom [ˈsvæ̂rjɛdɛmʊˌkrɑːtɪsk ˈɵ̂ŋdʊm], SDU) was the youth league of the Swedish political party Sweden Democrats until 12 September 2015.

== History ==
=== Background ===
The initial version of the youth league was founded in 1993 as an independent organization to its parent party. The original name was Sverigedemokraternas Ungdomsförbund (Sweden Democrat's Youth Association), but the organization was soon renamed Sverigedemokratisk Ungdom (Sweden Democratic Youth). The youth league was temporarily disbanded by the SD leadership in 1995 due to rampant problems with neo-Nazism in the ranks. At the time, the original leadership of the first league were dual-organized with the neo-Nazi group Stockholms Unga Nationalsocialister until 1995 when the mother party closed down the Sweden Democratic Youth on the grounds that "ideologically deviant persons" had taken over its leadership. Some of the original members of the youth league broke away from the Sweden Democrats to form the National Youth after the league was disbanded.

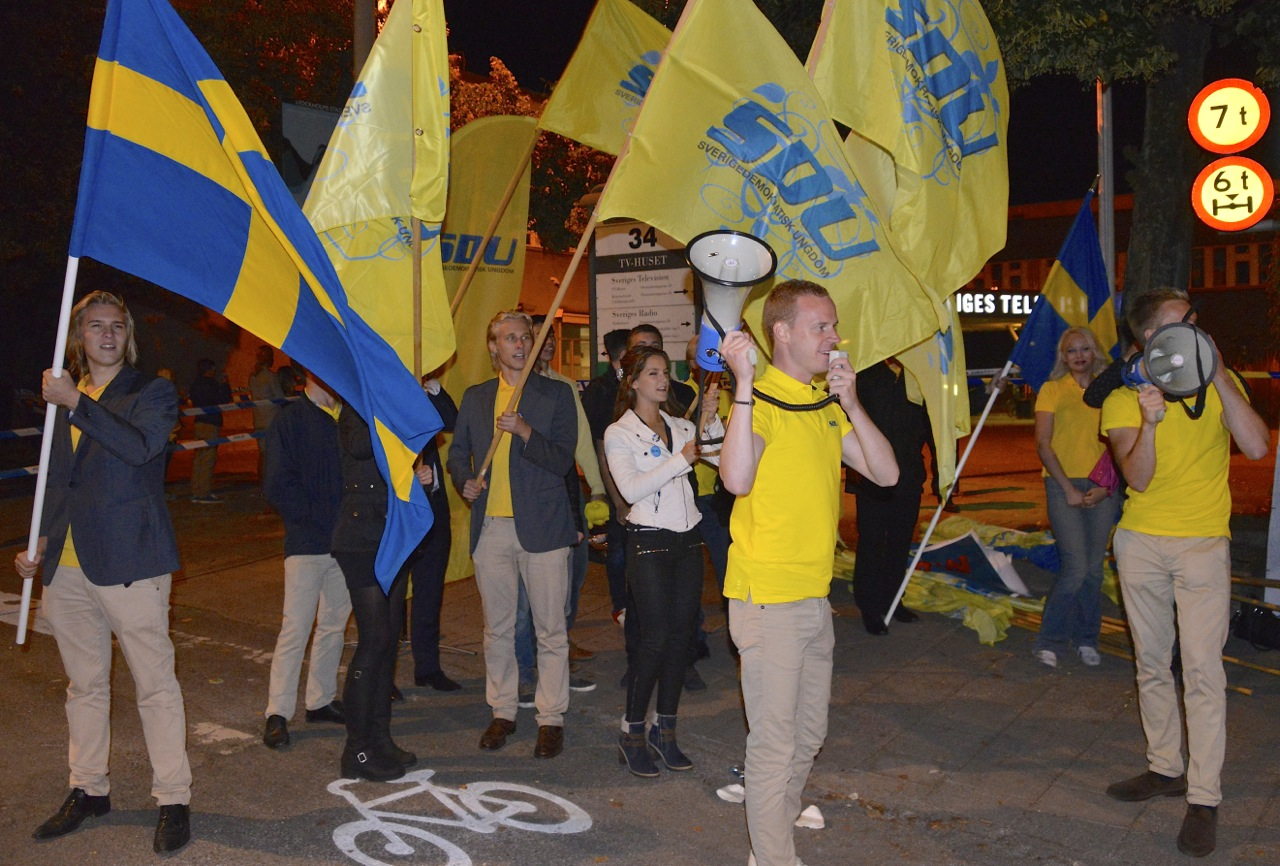
SDU activists photographed during the 2014 Swedish general election

The Sweden Democratic Youth was later reestablished as an independent organization in 1998 before becoming directly associated to the Sweden Democrats when it adopted a new set of principles. In 2007 redefined itself as a national conservative movement. Sweden Democrats leader Jimmie Åkesson served as chairman of the youth wing until 2005 when he was elected leader of the party. In 2009, members of the youth-wing including its then chairman Erik Almqvist were accused of threatening a Sveriges Radio reporter during a boat party on the MS Victoria I and confiscating her equipment. The journalist had been using a hidden microphone and camera to wiretap the SDU since 2008 before her identity was exposed on the ferry. Almqvist later said they were concerned the reporter was a member of Antifascistisk Aktion who was there to spy on them. Jimmie Åkesson criticized Sveriges Radio for using "license payers' money to deceive and secretly film politically engaged young people in private situations for several months." In 2010, Sveriges Radio said they had stopped attempting to secretly document the SDU.

In 2011, the SDU elected Gustav Kasselstrand as its chairman. Kasselstrand and his faction were described as more ethno-nationalist than the mother party and his election was described as the start of a rift between the SDU and the SD's leadership.

=== Conflict with the Sweden Democrats and second dissolution ===
In 2015, the SDU was threatened with dissociation by the Sweden Democrats after some of its members had were said to have expressed racist statements and its leadership were accused of collaborating with extremist groups such as the neo-fascist Nordic Youth. SDU's leader Gustav Kasselstrand, and its deputy leader William Hahne, were expelled from the party on 27 April 2015 due to this. They both denied the accusations of relations with extremist groups, and claimed that SD's parliamentary group leader Mattias Karlsson wanted to remove them after Hahne defeated the mother party leadership's preferred candidate for the SD chairmanship in Stockholm. Both Hahne and Kasselstrand had also supported Jessica Ohlson for the position of SDU chairperson. The Sweden Democrat leadership had considered Ohlson's views too radical and disobedient towards the mother party and instead endorsed Tobias Andersson and Dennis Dioukarev's campaigns for the position. Ohlson was subsequently elected leader of the SDU in 2015.

The Sweden Democrats subsequently announced that they would break ties with the youth league after an extended conflict with Ohlson's supporters and multiple controversies surrounding SDU members. The party leadership issued a timetable for members of the youth wing to dissociate themselves with the SDU or risk expulsion from the Sweden Democrats while Ohlson announced she would lead the SDU as an independent youth league. The leading members of SDU would then go on to form the right-wing populist party Alternative for Sweden in March 2018.

On 1 October 2015, the Sweden Democrats founded a new youth league, Young Swedes SDU.

== Chairs of the SDU ==
- Jimmy Windeskog (1998–2000)
- Jimmie Åkesson (2000–05)
- Martin Kinnunen (2005–07)
- Erik Almqvist (2007–10)
- William Petzäll (2010–11)
- Gustav Kasselstrand (2011–15)
- Jessica Ohlson (2015–2017)

== See also ==
- Finns Party Youth (2020)
- Young Alternative for Germany (2025)
