= Erik Almqvist =

Swedish politician (born 1982)

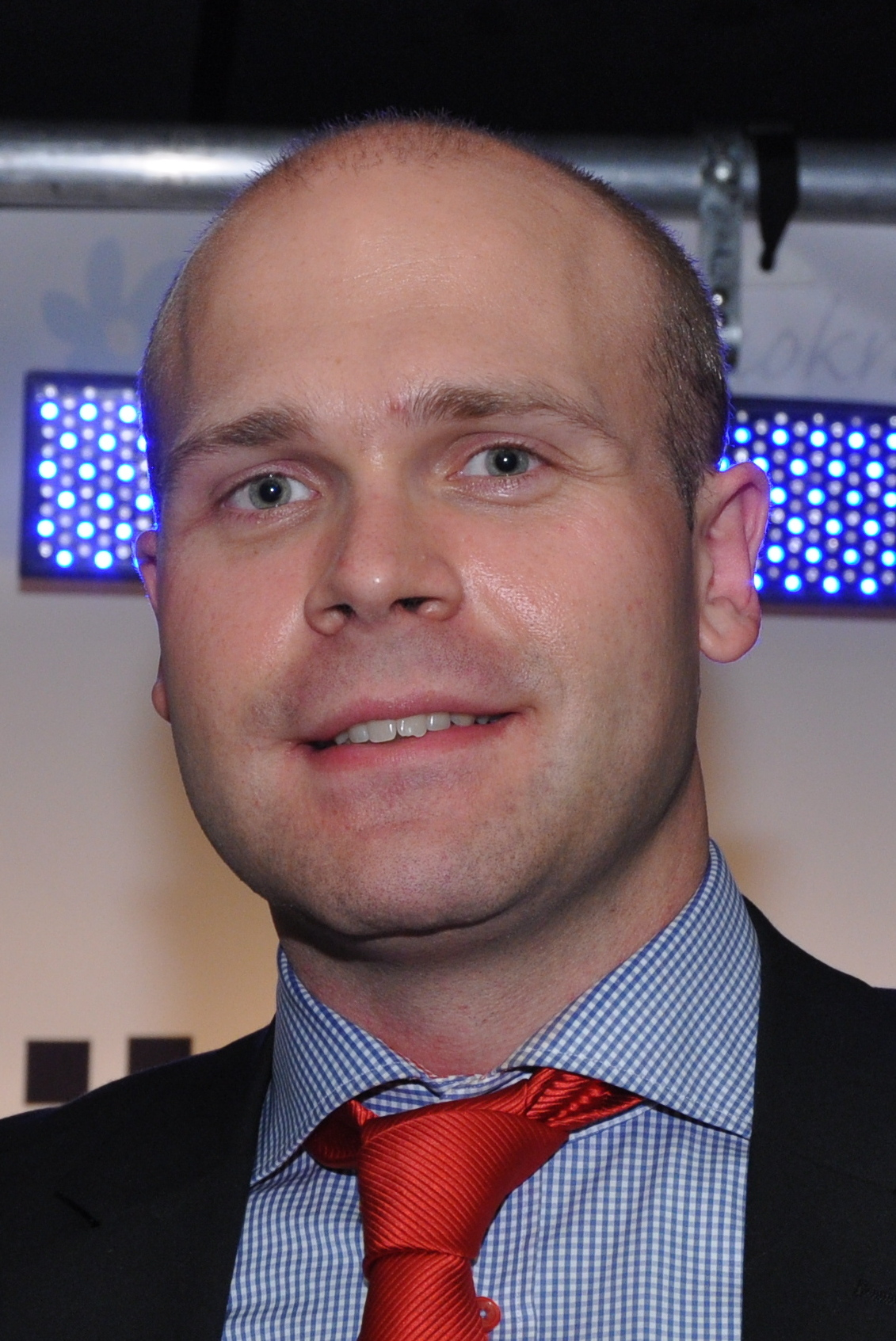
- Almqvist in 2010

Member of the Riksdag
- In office 4 October 2010 – 21 February 2013
- Succeeded by: Anna Hagwall
- Constituency: Västra Götaland County North

Chairman of the Sweden Democratic Youth
- In office 2007 – November 2010
- Preceded by: Martin Kinnunen
- Succeeded by: William Petzäll

Personal details
- Born: Erik Anders Almqvist; 24 May 1982 (age 44) Stockholm, Sweden
- Party: SD (until 2004–2013); Independent (2013–present)
- Other political affiliations: Liberal Party (1998–2004); Left Party (1998)
- Education: Lund University

Erik Anders Almqvist (born 24 May 1982) is a Swedish former politician. As a former member of the Sweden Democrats, he was member of the Swedish Riksdag from 2010 until his resignation on 21 February 2013 representing Västra Götaland County North.

== Biography ==
=== Education and career ===
Almqvist was born in Östermalm in 1982. He attended Viktor Rydberg Gymnasium in Stockholm and the International School of Brussels. After leaving school he worked within the IT sector and then as an insurance broker before studying for a master's degree in political science at Lund University before he started working for the Sweden Democrats.

Since October 2019, Almqvist has been editor-in-chief of the media channel Exact24. In July 2020, he travelled to Moscow to observe the referendum on changes to the Russian constitution. He was presented in the Russian media as a "Swedish election expert."

He now lives in Budapest, Hungary after moving there in 2013. Almqvist stated that the reason for the move was Hungary's "liberal social conservatism and nationalism" and the absence of "the Swedish groove of gender and multiculturalism."

=== Political career ===
Prior to becoming a member of the Sweden Democratic Youth, Almqvist was first a member of the Young Left and later of the Liberal Youth of Sweden from 1998 to 2004.

From 2007 to 2010, he was chairman of the Sweden Democratic Youth. During this years the membership and activity rise significantly as a result of a more activist approach, which began in the autumn of 2008 when it carried out a town square tour against "anti-Swedishness" during which Almqvist spoke and said that there was a structural hostility against Swedes that was hidden by "The Establishment". The campaign was marked by widespread and violent counter-demonstrations. He has also been the political secretary of the party in Skåne Regional Council.

On 17 January 2012 Almqvist took office as economic policy spokesman for his party. The former spokesman was criticized for being a weak debater and was replaced.

Almqvist was highlighted in April 2009 for a video from a conference trip with the youth league, where he and William Petzäll, then vice chairman of the youth league, sang and listened to songs from so-called white power music. Almqvist and Petzäll later claimed they were singing the songs ironically. In June 2010, Almqvist was involved in an altercation with a Swedish comedian Soran Ismail known as the "Iron Bar Scandal" in which he and several other leading SD politicians had filmed themselves calling people "Babbe" (derogatory insult meaning foreigner), "whore", brandishing iron poles and finally leaving the scene after talking to arriving policemen and chortling about how easy it is to "suck up" to the police.

In November 2012 the newspaper Expressen followed up the quarrel with Ismail, and could show unedited footage from the event, where Almqvist said that Ismail has a "behaviour like a babbe" (in Swedish, babbe is an invective word for an immigrant) and used epithets like "pussy". He also called a young Swedish woman "a little whore". SD has criticized Expressen for "cuttings and pastings" in the footage and that they do not want to show all the filmed material, which contrasts diametrically with the proven facts that SD had in fact manipulated the film and removed all traces of their actions. This event led to his resignation from the position as economic policy spokesman for the party and his place in the executive committee of the party and in the party board.

He resigned from the Riksdag and renounced his membership in the Sweden Democrats on 21 February 2013.
