= Alternative for Sweden =

Far-right Swedish political party

Alternative for Sweden Alternativ för Sverige
- Abbreviation: AFS
- Leader: Gustav Kasselstrand
- Deputy Leader: Mikael Jansson
- Secretary: Per Sefastsson
- Founders: Gustav Kasselstrand William Hahne
- Founded: 5 March 2018; 8 years ago
- Split from: Sweden Democrats
- Preceded by: Sweden Democratic Youth (de facto)
- Membership (2023): ▲3,400
- Ideology: Ultranationalism; Social conservatism; Right-wing populism; Hard Euroscepticism
- Political position: Far-right
- Colors: Blue; Yellow
- Riksdag: 0 / 349
- European Parliament: 0 / 21
- County councils: 0 / 1,597
- Municipal councils: 0 / 12,780
- National Council of the Church of Sweden: 0 / 251
- Diocese Councils of the Church of Sweden: 0 / 841

Website
- alternativforsverige.se

Alternative for Sweden (Swedish: Alternativ för Sverige, AFS) is a far-right political party in Sweden. It was founded in March 2018 by Gustav Kasselstrand and William Hahne, along with other members of the Sweden Democratic Youth, who were collectively expelled from the Sweden Democrats in 2015. The party's most prominent issue is return migration, advocating for the forced remigration of immigrants to their countries of origin, alongside Sweden's withdrawal from the European Union.

AFS ran in the general elections of 2018, 2022, and 2026, but has thus far failed to enter the Riksdag. With 0.26% of the vote, AFS was in 2022 the second largest party without representation in the Riksdag. In the 2019 European Parliament election in Sweden, the party ran on an anti-EU platform, receiving 0.46% of the vote. In November 2020, AFS announced its intention to run in the 2021 election to the Church of Sweden council. It won 1.26% of the votes, giving it three seats in the Church council. In 2025, AFS lost its three seats despite winning 1.64% of the vote this time, due to a newly introduced 2% threshold.

== History ==
=== Background ===
In early April 2015, the Sweden Democrats (SD) accused its youth league, the Sweden Democrat Youth (SDU), of having relations with the far-right and ethnonationalist organization Nordic Youth (Nordisk Ungdom) which had been founded by members of the National Democrats, an ethnopluralist breakaway group from the SD. The SDU had also encountered repeated controversies of its members being accused of making racist statements. In response to these alleged relations, SD threatened to expel several leading members of SDU unless the league moderated itself. SDU's leader Gustav Kasselstrand, and its deputy leader William Hahne, were eventually expelled from the party on 27 April 2015. They both denied the accusations of relations with extremist groups, and claimed that SD's parliamentary group leader Mattias Karlsson wanted to get rid of them after Hahne defeated the leadership's preferred candidate for the chairmanship of SDU in Stockholm.

Following the initial expulsion of the youth wing's chairman and deputy chairman, the mother party launched its own leadership candidate to compete against Jessica Ohlson, who was considered an ally of Kasselstrand and Hahne and deemed too radical by the SD for a leadership position. The SD warned that the party would break all ties with SDU if Ohlson were to be elected chairman. On 12 September 2015, Ohlson defeated the party's preferred candidate for the SDU chairmanship, and the party shut down SDU's website and broke all relations with its youth wing. It then established a new youth organization, Young Swedes (Ungsvenskarna) and produced a timetable that every SD member who remained a member of SDU should leave the league or risk expulsion from the mother party. Ohlson herself was officially expelled alongside five other SDU members on 25 October, but continued to serve as chairman of SDU, which went on to become an independent organization.

=== Founding and defections ===
In early 2017, Sveriges Radio reported that SDU members had filed a party registration application to the election authority. The party was eventually registered on 13 December 2017, with Kasselstrand, Hahne and Ohlson in central positions. It was then officially launched on 5 March 2018; at the same time, it announced that it would participate in the 2018 elections. At the time of the launch, the party was described as drawing inspiration from Alternative for Germany, the Freedom Party of Austria and the French National Rally.

Two Sweden Democrat members of the Riksdag, Olle Felten and Jeff Ahl, defected to the party later that month. According to the rules of the Riksdag, Felten and Ahl are considered independent MP's, meaning that Alternative for Sweden is not officially represented in the parliament. Mikael Jansson, former leader of the Sweden Democrats, also defected on 9 April, citing the mother party's recent lack of resistance to NATO as his main reason.

Before the 2018 elections, the party was one of the largest in terms of social media interactions and expected to enter the parliament after the elections, with leader Gustav Kasselstrand asking people on Twitter to prepare for "Sweden's biggest political earthquake in modern times". However, the party failed to enter parliament by a large margin, receiving just 0.31 out of the 4.0 percent needed to get past the election threshold. On election night, the party was reported to have been kicked out of the Persian restaurant it had rented to celebrate the election results. According to high-level officials at Facebook, AFS social media interactions were reviewed just before the 2018 election. Accused of using bots to manipulate the algorithm and inflate the party's perceived popularity, actions were taken by Facebook to limit certain activities of AFS accounts just before the election. It did not participate in the municipal elections.

=== Since 2018 ===
After the 2018 election, the party participated in the 2019 election for the European Parliament, but failed to gain a seat.

In March 2020, the party's deputy chairman and founding member William Hahne resigned from his position, after he had been revealed by Expressen to run a webshop selling surgical masks for a price 759% higher than other commercial sellers of surgical masks during the COVID-19 pandemic.

== Ideology and policies ==
On its website, Alternative for Sweden lists three key issues:

1. Remigration of immigrants
2. Democracy and politicians
3. Law and order

AFS has been described as right-wing, far-right and right-wing populist by Svenska Dagbladet, while Dagens Nyheter has described the party as nationalist and right-wing populist. Bloomberg News has described the party as social conservative and far-right. The ideology of the party has also been described as close to the identitarian and alt-right movements. During the 2019 European Parliament election party leader Kasselstrand was endorsed by the far-right European party Alliance for Peace and Freedom (APF) on Facebook.

Prominent members of the Sweden Democrats party, from which AFS split, such as Henrik Vinge have criticised the ideology of AFS as being too extreme.

=== Economic policies ===
Alternative for Sweden has stated in its program that the party wants to shift from progressive to a flat income tax and uniform VAT with a fixed rate. AFS also desires to re-nationalise all schools, and combat the idea of a cashless society.

==== Energy ====
AFS wishes to make the country self-sufficient and end the use of fossil fuels, citing both environmental protection and national security reasons.

=== Foreign policies ===
Unlike the Sweden Democrats, AFS is non-interventionist and displays hard Euroscepticism, wherein it considers the European Union a threat to Sweden's independence and seeks to call for the country to leave the EU. AFS leader Gustav Kasselstrand has stated opposition to the USA and Israel's military actions against Iran.

==== Defence ====
The party seeks to rearm the military and form a Nordic defense alliance, instead of making Sweden dependent on NATO.

==== International relations ====
During a visit to Moscow in 2018, party leader Gustav Kasselstrand attended a conference to establish connections with other nationalist parties in Europe. That same year, Mikael Jansson met with close contacts to president Bashar al-Assad during a visit to Syria.

In July 2022, several representatives from Alternative for Sweden, including Anders Feymark, travelled to Hungary to meet officials from the Hungarian party Our Homeland Movement, a party described as a "sister party" to Alternative for Sweden. Representatives from Alternative for Germany and Forum for Democracy were also present. Our Homeland Movement party leader László Toroczkai, as well as Alternative for Germany's Stefan Korte, both held individual speeches at Alternative for Sweden's election campaign meeting held in Rålambshovsparken in Stockholm on 6 August 2022.

=== Social policies ===
The party is critical of the current political establishment which it accuses of being naive and overly politically correct. Alternative for Sweden accuses the Left of hijacking societal institutions to rewrite history. They advocate for reducing the legal limit for abortions to twelve weeks, while also opposing both same-sex adoptions and identical-sex marriages within the Church of Sweden. They want to ban the construction of mosques and eliminate state press subsidies. The party proposes a complete dissolution of Sweden's public service broadcasting network, comprising SVT, SR, and UR.

==== Immigration ====
In March 2018, Jeff Ahl gave a speech in the Riksdag, stating that hundreds of thousands of people would be deported out of Sweden if Alternative for Sweden gained power. Gustav Kasselstrand asserted that compulsory measures would drive at least one million immigrants out of Sweden. The party's strategy involves a complete overhaul of the current immigration system, including the dissolution of the Swedish Migration Agency in favor of a new "Return Agency" tasked with re-evaluating every residence permit granted since 2000.

==== LGBT issues ====
Alternative for Sweden is supportive of a ban on same-sex adoption as well as same-sex marriage. The party has described same-sex marriage as a "modern construction intended to commit violence against multi-thousand-year-old traditions". Alternative for Sweden has accused Stockholm Pride of sexualising minors.

== Organization ==
=== Leadership ===
==== Leaders ====
No.	Leader	Portrait	Entered office	Left office	Length of Leadership
1	Gustav Kasselstrand		5 March 2018	Incumbent	8 years, 7 months and 29 days

==== Deputy Leaders ====
No.	Leader	Portrait	Entered office	Left office	Length of Leadership
1	William Hahne		5 March 2018	23 March 2020	2 years, 0 months and 18 days
2	Mikael Jansson		28 November 2020	Incumbent	5 years, 11 months and 6 days

=== Membership ===
Historical membership in 1-year intervals, 2018–Present
Year	Pop.	±%
2018	2,057	—
2019	1,742	−15.3%
2020	2,204	+26.5%
2021	2,726	+23.7%
2022	3,100	+13.7%
source		—

== Election results ==
=== Riksdag ===
Election	Leader	Votes	%	Seats	+/−	Government
2018	Gustav Kasselstrand	20,290	0.31 (#10)	0 / 349	New	No seats
2022	Gustav Kasselstrand	16,646	0.26 (#10)	0 / 349	0	No seats
2026	Gustav Kasselstrand	26,729	0.39 (#10)	0 / 349	0	No seats

=== European Parliament ===
Election	List leader	Votes	%	Seats	+/−	EP Group
2019	Unclear	19,178	0.46 (#10)	0 / 20	New	–
2024	Gustav Kasselstrand	17,049	0.41 (#10)	0 / 21	0	–

=== Church of Sweden Council ===
Election	Votes	%	Seats	+/−	Government
2021	10,358	1.26 (#12)	3 / 251	New	Opposition
2025	13,521	1.64 (#12)	0 / 251	▼3	No seats
