= Gustav Kasselstrand =

Swedish politician (born 1987)

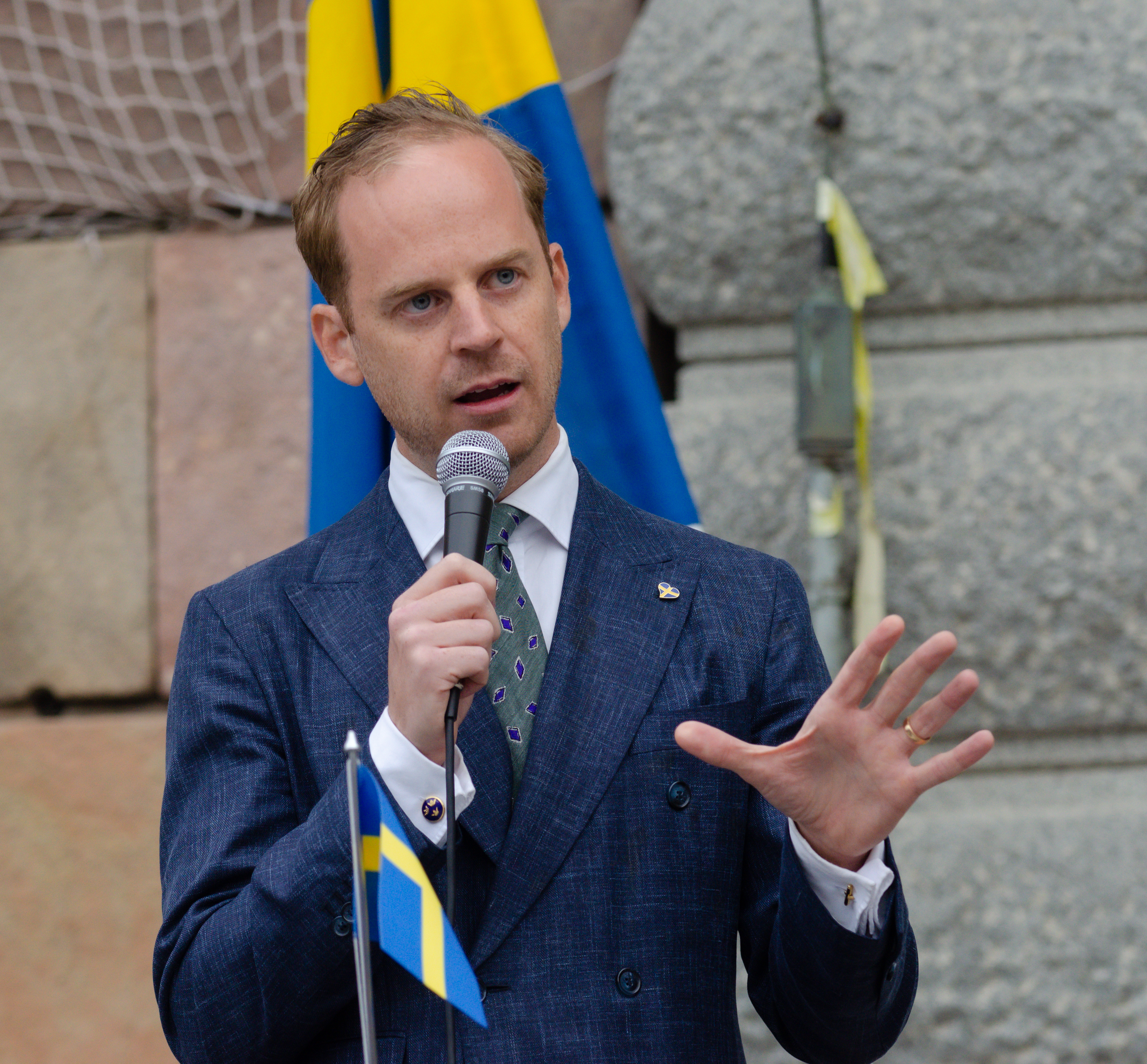
- Gustav Kasselstrand speaking at Mynttorget in Stockholm on 10 September 2022.

Leader of Alternative for Sweden
- Incumbent
- Assumed office 5 March 2018
- Deputy: Mikael Jansson
- Preceded by: Party established

Chairman of the Sweden Democratic Youth (Note: Gustav Kasselstrand was expelled from the Sweden Democrats on 27 April 2015. He remained on his post as head of the youth league until early September 2015, when he and William Hahne left the youth league.)
- In office 10 September 2011 – 12 September 2015
- Preceded by: William Petzäll
- Succeeded by: Jessica Ohlson

Deputy Chairman of the Sweden Democratic Youth
- In office 20 November 2010 – February 2011
- Succeeded by: William Hahne

Personal details
- Born: Gustav Mattias Anton Kasselstrand; 27 June 1987 (age 39) Valdemarsvik, Sweden
- Party: Alternative for Sweden (2018–present)
- Other political affiliations: Sweden Democrats (until 2015)
- Spouse: Kira Ström (m. 2020)
- Children: 3
- Education: Aalto University; Nanyang Technological University; University of Gothenburg

Military service
- Allegiance: Sweden
- Branch/service: Life Guards; Home Guard
- Years of service: 2007–2019
- Unit: Royal Guards; Livgardesgruppen

Gustav Mattias Anton Kasselstrand (born 27 June 1987) is a Swedish politician who co-founded the Alternative for Sweden (AFS) in 2018. He was chairman of the Sweden Democratic Youth (SDU) from 2011 to 2015 and served as political secretary to the Sweden Democrats in the Riksdag from 2011 to 2012. Kasselstrand was expelled from the Sweden Democrats on 27 April 2015 but remained chairman of the SDU until 12 September 2015, when Jessica Ohlson succeeded to the post and the Sweden Democrats subsequently cut ties with their youth league.

== Early life ==
Gustav Mattias Anton Kasselstrand was born on 27 June 1987 in Valdemarsvik, Sweden. Between 2006 and 2010, he studied German and economics at the University of Gothenburg, completing terms abroad in Germany and Singapore. Kasselstrand later graduated with an MBA from Aalto University in Helsinki in 2019.

== Political career up to 2015 ==
=== Sweden Democrats ===
==== Sweden Democratic Youth ====
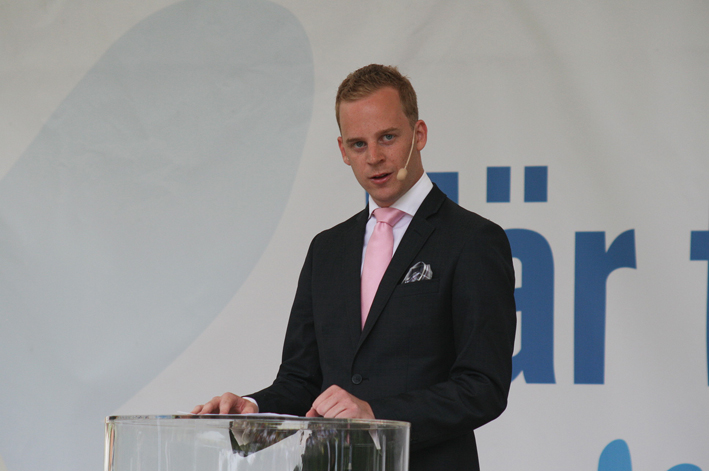
Kasselstrand speaking at the 2011 Almedalen Week in Visby about the Swedish elections

Kasselstrand joined the Sweden Democrats while a student. At the Sweden Democratic Youth's federal congress on 20 November 2010, Kasselstrand was elected deputy chairman of the youth league. After the resignation of the former chairman William Petzäll — due to alcohol problems in February 2011 — he was appointed to be the new acting chairman of the youth league. Kasselstrand had previously worked at the Sweden Democrats' office in the Riksdag with the party's economic policy that included a focus on the labor, financial and tax market.

Kasselstrand was the second vice chairman of the Sweden Democrats' party district in Gothenburg and campaign organizer for the central parts of the city during the 2010 general election campaign. Under his leadership, the first major demonstration by the youth league in years was arranged in the spring of 2011 when SDU demonstrated against what they called "anti-Swedishness", something that according to themselves, is a type of racism and hostility directed at ethnic Swedes.

Before SDU's ordinary federal congress between 10 and 11 September 2011 in Jönköping, a unanimous nomination committee proposed Gustav Kasselstrand to be the ordinary chairman of the youth league. At the federal congress on 10 September, Kasselstrand was elected ordinary chairman unanimously by acclamation.

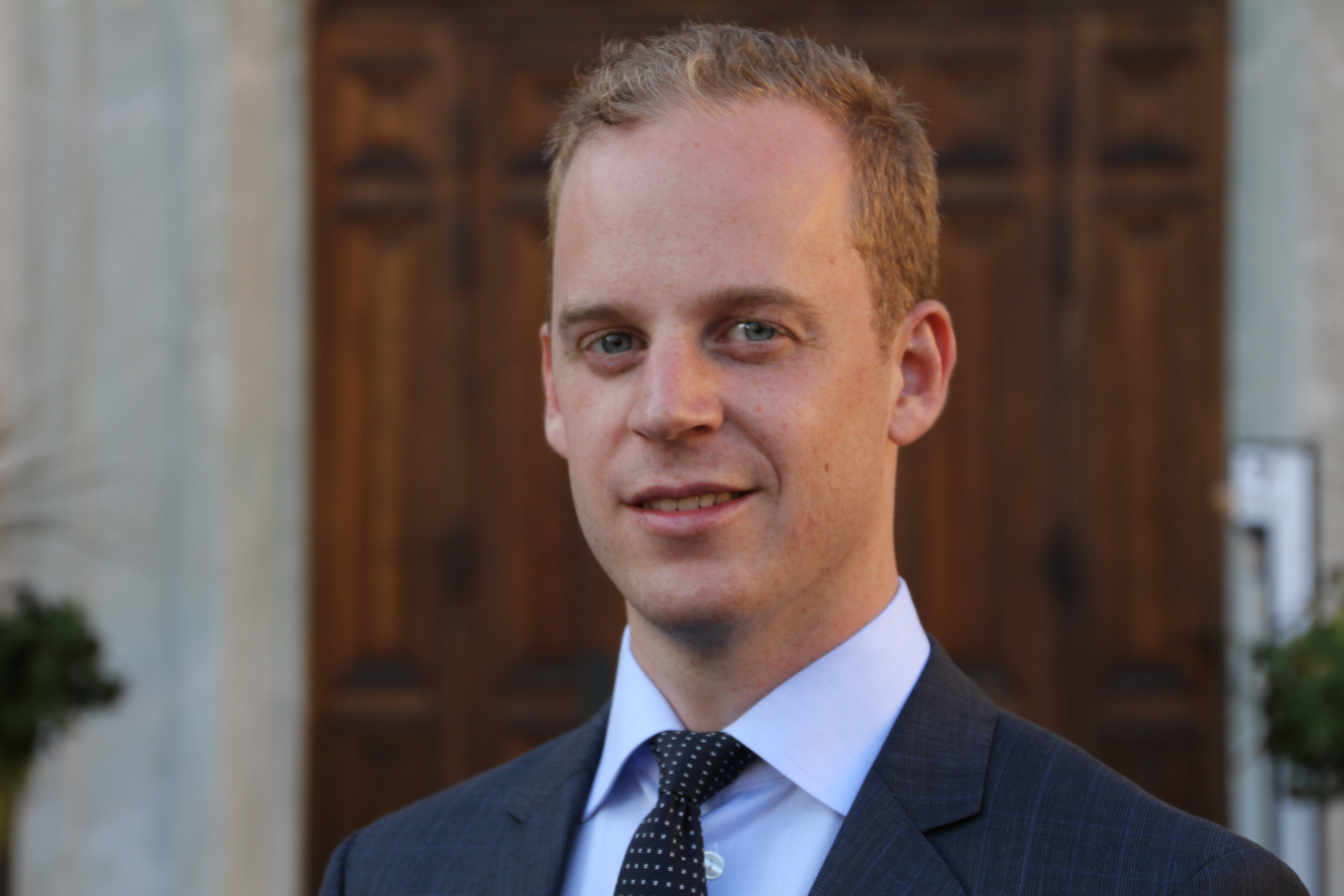
Kasselstrand in September 2013

On 1 September 2012, Kasselstrand was re-elected as chairman of the youth league. He won over the opposing candidate Paula Bieler with the votes 39–10. Bieler ran when she stated that the youth league had been too clear in its criticism of the mother party in the public. She referred to the article in which Kasselstrand and the youth league's deputy chairman William Hahne had criticized the Sweden Democrats' policy regarding the Israeli–Palestinian conflict.

During his time as spokesman of the SDU, a rift between the mother party leadership and the SDU began to grow with the SDU being accused of adopting a more politically radical and hardline tone and dragging the mother party into disrepute with public controversies involving SDU members. Among other things, Kasselstrand and SDU vice-chairman William Hahne published an opinion article in Aftonbladet in which they criticized the SD's pro-Israel policy and argued the SD should officially recognize the State of Palestine in November 2012. The same month, Kasselstrand and Hahne also attracted attention after going against the mother party again, this time by criticizing the situation surrounding Erik Almqvist in the acclaimed "Iron Pipe Scandal." These two instances led to him being removed from his job as political secretary and assistant to the Sweden Democrats' parliamentary office on 21 November.

In September 2013 — Kasselstrand wrote a comment on Twitter — referring to U.S. President Barack Obama's state visit to Stockholm: "I would rather welcome Vladimir Putin than Barack Obama to Sweden's capital". Kasselstrand's comment got a lot of attention and was noticed in several Swedish newspapers.

Ahead of SDU's congress in Linköping between 6 and 8 September 2013, another unanimous nomination committee proposed the re-election of Gustav Kasselstrand as chairman of the youth league. He was later re-elected by acclamation on 7 September.

Kasselstrand led the youth league through the election year 2014 and at the congress between 28 and 30 November 2014, he was challenged for the chairmanship by Henrik Vinge. On 29 November 2014, Kasselstrand won again and remained on his post as chairman.

==== Expulsion and resignation ====
On 27 April 2015, Kasselstrand was expelled as a member from the Sweden Democrats due to multiple incidents, which according to the SD party leadership included Kasselstrand and other senior SDU spokespeople maintaining contacts with extremist groups such as the neo-Nazi Nordic Youth, publicly clashing with the mother party on policy and SDU activists not facing discipline for expressing racist and extremist statements under Kasselstrand's leadership with the SD accusing Kasselstrand of tolerating and encouraging this among the SDU membership. The exclusion came after Kasselstrand's party colleague and deputy chairman of SDU, William Hahne, had been voted to be the chairman of the Sweden Democrats' Stockholm district, against the will of the mother party leadership. Kasselstrand denied the accusations of extremism and called the action "undemocratic" and meant that it was all a way for the party leadership to secure their own power and positions, and that they feared the upcoming generation in the youth league to gain more influence. Kasselstrand continued on his position as the chairman for the youth league until the annual congress in September the same year. He resigned on the congress on 12 September 2015, having served as chairman for nearly five years.

After Kasselstrand's resignation during the congress in September 2015, Jessica Ohlson won the election as the new chairman against Tobias Andersson, who had major support from the party officials in his candidacy. Ohlson was considered to be one of Kasselstrand's closest collaborators, having served as the youth league secretary during Kasselstrand's chairmanship but her candidacy was opposed by the SD who also considered her to be too radical and disobedient to the mother party. Only hours after Ohlson was elected as the new chairman, the Sweden Democrats announced their break-up from the youth league in order to form a whole new youth organization. Meanwhile, Ohlson declared that she was to continue to lead the original youth league as an independent youth league. In connection with the break-up between the mother party and the youth league, Kasselstrand demanded together with Hahne and Ohlson that the party leader Jimmie Åkesson would resign from his post. They did also publicly declare that they "will consider all opportunities" in the future regarding the possibility to form a new political party.

== Alternative for Sweden ==
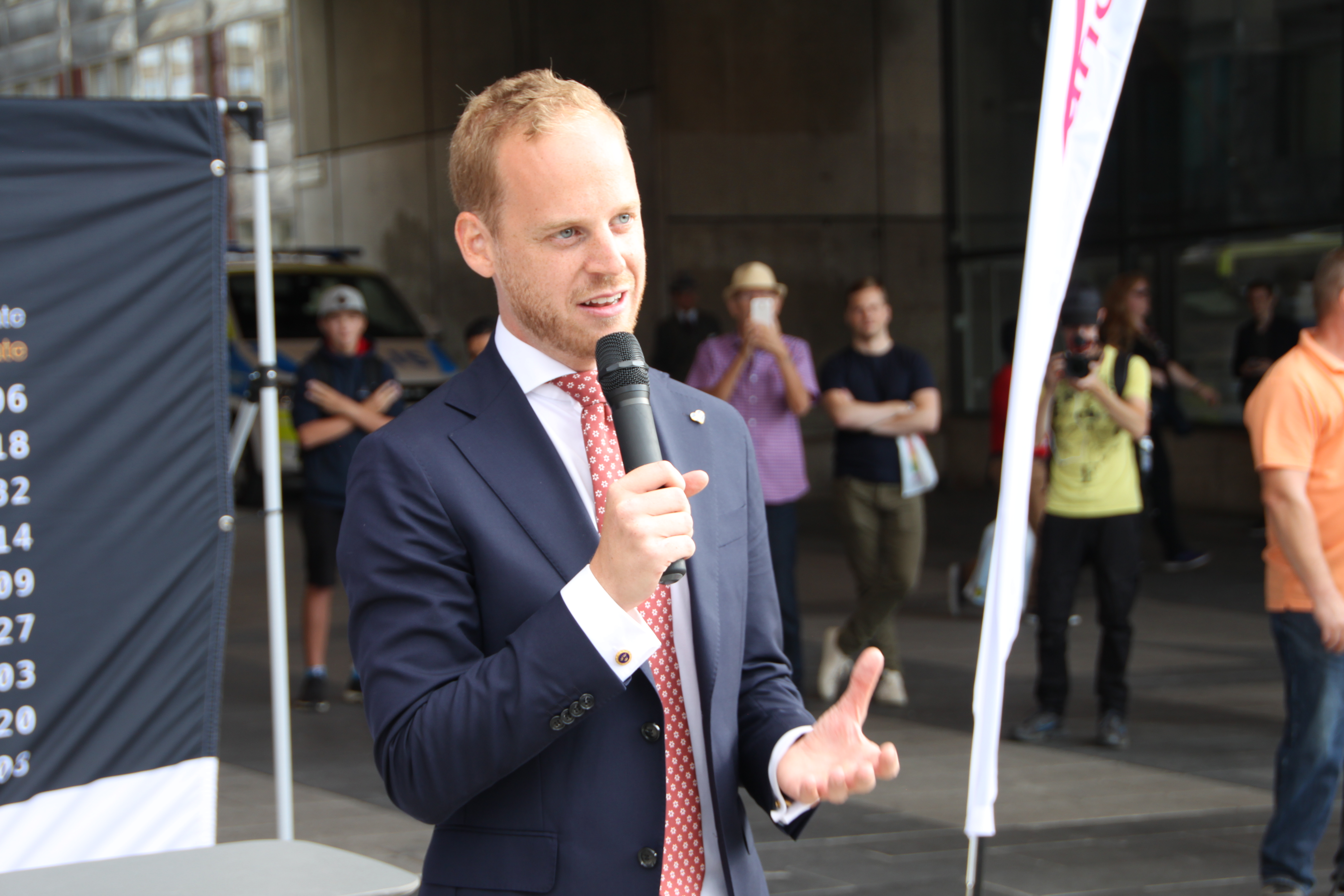
Kasselstrand speaking at an Alternative for Sweden rally in Stockholm, 11 August 2018

When Kasselstrand and William Hahne were expelled from the Sweden Democrats in the spring of 2015, media considered the possibility of the Youth League starting its own party to challenge the Sweden Democrats. Following the election of Jessica Ohlson as chair of the SDU following Kasselstrand's expulsion, the Youth League in its entirety was disassociated and a new Youth League, Young Swedes SDU, launched under runner-up Tobias Andersson’s leadership. The leadership of SDU stated that they would consider all opportunities to establish a new political party — which materialised when they contacted the election authorities regarding the registration of the party Alternative for Sweden. The registration for the party was completed on 13 December 2017. During a congress in Stockholm on 5 March 2018, Alternative for Sweden was officially launched. Kasselstrand held a speech during the meeting, talking about the future of the party and the future of Sweden.

During the speech, Kasselstrand stated three points, saying: "Firstly: We are Sweden's anti-establishment party. Secondly: We are Sweden's return migration party! Thirdly: We are Sweden's next parliamentary party!"

In a reportage made by TV4 after the speech, Kasselstrand talked further about the key points that he had mentioned and stated that Alternative for Sweden was against the establishment by saying that "We want to do everything we can to pass the Swedish political establishment to the dustbin of history." He also stated that they were the return migration party, saying that "We're the only party that dares to pursue the question regarding return immigration in Sweden." The third statement was that Alternative for Sweden was the party for "law and order". It also relied on Trump-like slogans like “draining the political swamp”, and decrying the Sweden Democrats as an authoritarian, oligarchic party too interested in power to mind its core principles or allow any internal frictions or controversy.

=== 2018 general election ===
Soon after the party's launch on 5 March 2018, officials announced that Alternative for Sweden was to run for the 2018 general election. On 11 August 2018, Alternative for Sweden kicked off "Återvandringsturnén" ("The Return Immigration Tour") in Stockholm.

== Broadcasting career ==
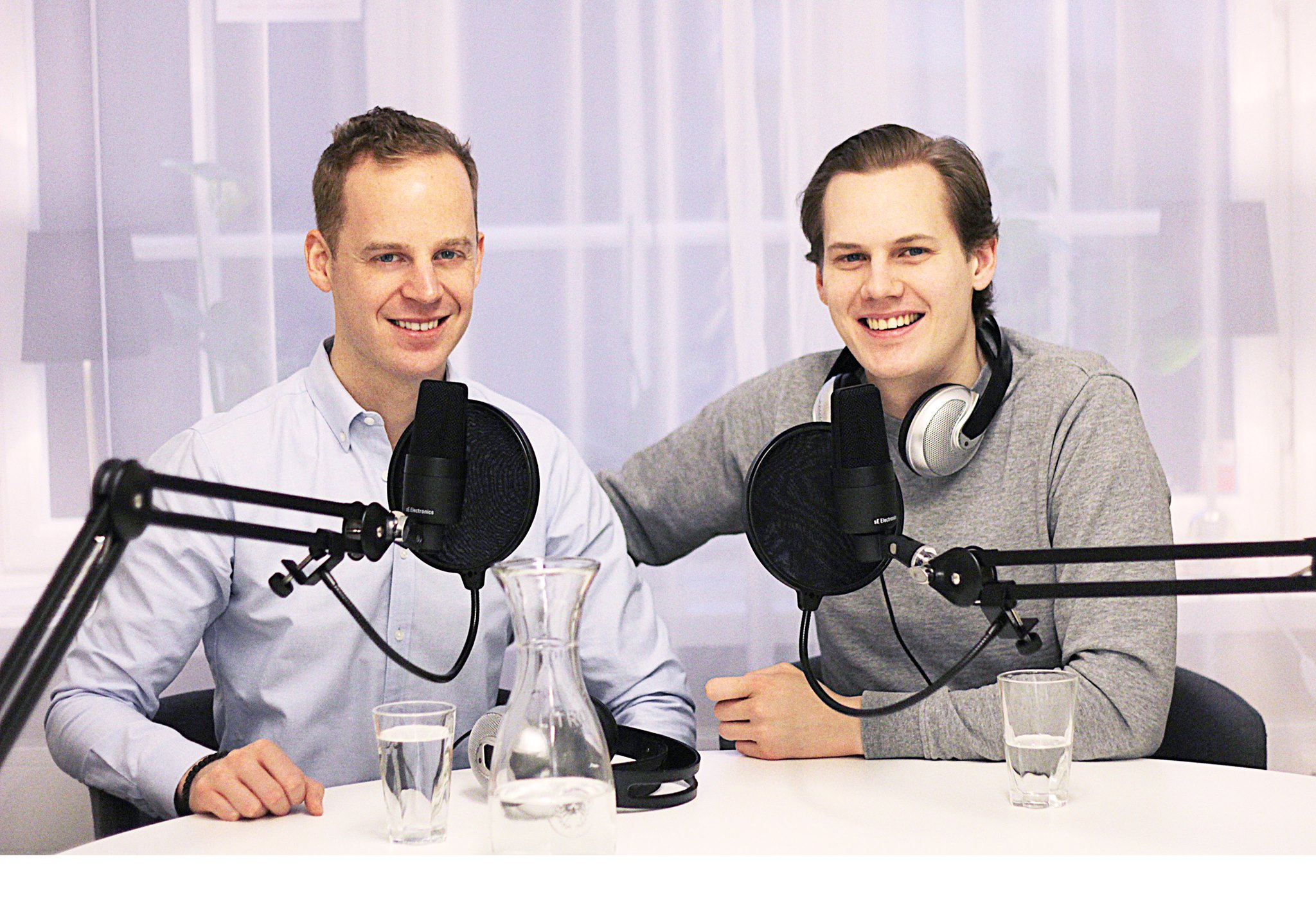
Kasselstrand with Erik Berglund in 2016

=== Den kokta grodan ===
From January 2016 to January 2019, Kasselstrand hosted the podcast "Den kokta grodan" ("The Boiled Frog") together with his friend Erik Berglund. During the span of three years — the time the podcast was running — a total of 128 episodes were made. A number of bonus episodes have been made spontaneously during rally's arranged by Alternative for Sweden.

== Personal life ==
In 2020 he married Kira Kasselstrand (née Ström), with whom he has one daughter: Freja (born 2020) and one son (born 2022).

Outside of politics, Kasselstrand is a keen tennis fan.
