= Results of the 2026 Swedish general election =

Sweden held a general election on 13 September 2026.

== National results ==
Party	Votes	%	Seats	+/–
By party
Social Democrats	1,895,989	28.02	99	–8
Moderate Party	1,343,448	19.85	70	+2
Sweden Democrats	1,183,248	17.48	62	–11
Left Party	568,781	8.40	30	+6
Centre Party	475,780	7.03	25	+1
Christian Democrats	417,490	6.17	22	+3
Green Party	414,307	6.12	22	+4
Liberals	361,187	5.34	19	+3
Örebro Party	39,644	0.59	0	New
Alternative for Sweden	26,729	0.39	0	0
Christian Values Party	9,017	0.13	0	0
Ambition Sweden	7,679	0.11	0	New
Pirate Party	7,464	0.11	0	0
Citizens' Coalition	4,118	0.06	0	0
Human Rights and Democracy	3,556	0.05	0	0
Communist Party of Sweden	2,167	0.03	0	0
Enad Röst	1,286	0.02	0	0
Nuance Party	1,069	0.02	0	0
Other parties (fewer than 1,000 votes)	4,470	0.07	–	–
Total	6,767,429	100.00	349	0
Valid votes	6,767,429	99.02		
Invalid votes	7,427	0.11		
Blank votes	59,557	0.87		
Total votes	6,834,413	100.00		
Registered voters/turnout	8,051,355	84.89		
Source: Election Authority
By bloc
Andersson's Bloc (S+MP+V+C)	3,354,857	49.57	176	+3
Kristersson's Bloc (M+SD+KD+L)	3,305,373	48.84	173	–3
Others	107,199	1.58	0	0
Total	6,767,429	100.00	349	0
Valid votes	6,767,429	99.02		
Invalid votes	7,427	0.11		
Blank votes	59,557	0.87		
Total votes	6,834,413	100.00		
Registered voters/turnout	8,051,355	84.89		
Source: Election Authority

== Results by greater region ==
=== Percentage share ===
Land	Turnout	Share	Votes	S	M	SD	V	C	KD	MP	L	Other	Left	Right	Margin
Land	%	%		%	%	%	%	%	%	%	%	%	%	%	
Götaland	84.9	48.0	3,246,832	26.8	20.1	19.4	8.2	6.6	6.7	5.7	5.3	1.4	47.2	51.4	135,381
Svealand	84.9	40.6	2,748,847	27.6	20.5	15.2	9.0	7.6	5.6	6.8	5.8	1.8	51.1	47.1	109,364
Norrland	84.6	11.4	771,750	34.7	16.6	17.8	7.2	6.8	6.3	5.4	3.6	1.6	54.1	44.3	49,484
Total	84.9	100.0	6,767,429	28.0	19.9	17.5	8.4	7.0	6.2	6.1	5.3	1.6	49.5	48.8	49,484
Source: Sweden's Election Authority

=== By votes ===
Land	Turnout	Share	Votes	S	M	SD	V	C	KD	MP	L	Other	Left	Right	Margin
Land	%	%													
Götaland	84.9	48.0	3,246,832	868,548	651,431	628,353	264,907	214,873	215,953	184,359	172,331	46,077	1,532,687	1,668,068	135,381
Svealand	84.9	40.6	2,748,847	759,673	564,231	417,294	248,195	208,731	153,195	188,250	160,765	48,513	1,404,849	1,295,485	109,364
Norrland	84.6	11.4	771,750	267,768	127,786	137,601	55,679	52,176	48,342	41,698	28,091	12,609	417,321	341,820	75,501
Total	84.9	100.0	6,767,429	1,895,989	1,343,448	1,183,248	568,781	475,780	417,490	414,307	361,187	107,199	3,354,857	3,305,373	49,484
Source: Sweden's Election Authority

== Results by statistical area ==
=== Percentage share ===
Land	Turnout	Share	Votes	S	M	SD	V	C	KD	MP	L	Other	Left	Right	Margin
Land	%	%		%	%	%	%	%	%	%	%	%	%	%	
East Middle Sweden	85.3	17.0	1,147,802	29.1	19.2	18.3	8.0	6.4	6.2	5.7	4.8	2.3	49.2	48.5	7,383
Middle Norrland	84.9	3.6	245,799	33.4	16.7	18.6	6.2	8.0	6.5	5.3	3.6	1.7	52.9	45.4	18,565
North Middle Sweden	84.7	8.2	557,168	30.8	18.7	21.2	6.1	6.2	6.7	4.4	4.2	1.7	47.5	50.8	18,038
Småland & Islands	85.7	8.4	568,547	27.9	19.4	20.2	6.4	6.9	8.8	4.3	4.5	1.5	45.6	53.0	42,045
South Sweden	83.8	14.7	995,820	25.5	20.2	21.3	8.7	6.2	5.4	6.0	5.6	1.2	46.4	52.4	59,822
Stockholm County	84.7	22.8	1,539,621	26.0	21.8	12.1	10.2	8.6	4.9	8.0	6.8	1.4	52.9	45.7	110,527
Upper Norrland	84.7	5.0	341,414	37.2	15.8	15.3	8.2	6.2	6.2	6.1	3.4	1.6	57.7	40.7	58,076
West Sweden	85.3	20.3	1,371,258	26.9	20.2	17.8	8.7	6.8	6.7	6.0	5.5	1.5	48.3	50.2	25,162
Total	84.9	100.0	6,767,429	28.0	19.9	17.5	8.4	7.0	6.2	6.1	5.3	1.6	49.5	48.8	49,484
Source: Sweden's Election Authority

=== By votes ===
Land	Turnout	Share	Votes	S	M	SD	V	C	KD	MP	L	Other	Left	Right	Margin
Land	%	%													
East Middle Sweden	85.3	17.0	1,147,802	334,023	220,811	209,607	91,696	73,390	71,671	65,464	55,101	26,039	564,573	557,190	7,383
Middle Norrland	84.9	3.6	245,799	82,001	40,960	45,753	15,299	19,733	15,892	13,077	8,940	4,144	130,110	111,545	18,565
North Middle Sweden	84.7	8.2	557,168	171,566	104,343	118,012	34,023	34,565	37,373	24,757	23,221	9,308	264,911	282,949	18,038
Småland & Islands	85.7	8.4	568,547	158,363	110,318	115,014	36,633	39,397	50,231	24,706	25,581	8,304	259,099	301,144	42,045
South Sweden	83.8	14.7	995,820	253,683	200,679	211,877	87,017	61,400	53,689	59,709	55,386	12,380	461,809	521,631	59,822
Stockholm County	84.7	22.8	1,539,621	401,071	335,750	186,898	156,902	133,169	76,101	123,319	105,185	21,226	814,461	703,934	110,527
Upper Norrland	84.7	5.0	341,414	127,047	54,109	52,121	27,911	21,263	21,039	20,841	11,717	5,366	197,062	138,986	58,076
West Sweden	85.3	20.3	1,371,258	368,235	276,478	243,966	119,300	92,863	91,494	82,434	76,056	20,432	662,832	687,994	25,162
Total	84.9	100.0	6,767,429	1,895,989	1,343,448	1,183,248	568,781	475,780	417,490	414,307	361,187	107,199	3,354,857	3,305,373	49,484
Source: Sweden's Election Authority

== Results by constituency ==
=== Percentage share ===
Constituency	Land	Turnout	Share	Votes	S	M	SD	V	C	KD	MP	L	Other	Left	Right	Margin
Constituency		%	%		%	%	%	%	%	%	%	%	%	%	%	
Blekinge	G	85.6	1.5	104,309	28.7	18.3	24.4	5.9	5.4	7.3	3.8	4.9	1.4	43.8	54.9	11,564
Dalarna	S	85.0	2.8	187,850	29.5	18.4	22.3	5.8	6.5	7.1	4.7	4.0	1.7	46.5	51.8	9,835
Gothenburg	G	82.7	5.6	380,417	27.1	18.2	11.8	15.1	6.5	4.9	9.1	5.9	1.4	57.8	40.8	64,749
Gotland	G	86.9	0.6	41,526	31.1	18.3	13.5	6.7	10.7	5.2	7.9	5.3	1.2	56.5	42.3	5,882
Gävleborg	N	84.0	2.7	184,537	31.8	17.7	21.5	6.8	6.1	6.2	4.2	4.0	1.7	48.9	49.5	1,140
Halland	G	86.7	3.4	230,235	25.6	23.3	19.6	5.3	7.5	7.0	4.4	5.9	1.3	42.8	55.9	30,235
Jämtland	N	85.1	1.3	86,814	31.5	17.4	17.6	6.0	10.1	5.5	6.6	3.5	1.7	54.2	44.0	8,849
Jönköping	G	85.6	3.5	236,678	26.6	19.7	20.6	6.0	7.0	10.2	3.8	4.6	1.5	43.4	55.2	27,927
Kalmar	G	85.7	2.4	161,796	29.0	18.7	21.4	6.1	6.4	8.4	4.1	4.3	1.5	45.7	52.8	11,397
Kronoberg	G	85.6	1.9	128,547	27.7	20.0	20.3	7.6	6.2	8.0	4.4	4.4	1.4	46.0	52.7	8,603
Malmö	G	80.1	3.1	212,965	29.0	16.5	13.2	17.2	5.9	3.3	9.3	4.6	1.2	61.3	37.5	50,592
Norrbotten	N	83.9	2.4	160,359	37.5	16.4	18.1	6.9	5.1	6.4	4.5	3.4	1.7	54.1	44.3	15,683
Skåne NE	G	83.8	3.0	206,399	23.2	20.8	27.3	5.9	5.3	6.9	3.6	5.5	1.4	38.1	60.5	46,115
Skåne S	G	87.4	4.0	271,168	22.8	23.2	19.8	6.0	8.0	5.3	7.2	6.5	1.1	44.0	54.9	29,468
Skåne W	G	82.4	3.0	200,979	26.0	20.1	24.1	7.8	5.3	5.2	4.4	5.7	1.3	43.6	55.1	23,267
Stockholm	S	85.8	9.6	652,543	26.3	19.1	8.4	13.0	9.8	3.8	11.1	7.1	1.2	60.3	38.5	142,533
Stockholm County	S	83.8	13.1	887,078	25.8	23.8	14.9	8.1	7.8	5.7	5.7	6.6	1.5	47.5	51.1	32,006
Södermanland	S	84.0	2.8	190,962	30.5	19.6	20.2	7.3	5.6	5.7	4.8	4.5	1.7	48.3	50.0	4,504
Uppsala	S	86.8	3.9	265,992	27.1	18.4	15.6	9.7	7.7	6.6	8.3	5.0	1.6	52.8	45.6	19,268
Värmland	S	85.2	2.7	184,781	31.1	20.1	19.7	5.8	6.1	6.9	4.4	4.4	1.6	47.3	51.1	7,063
Västerbotten	N	85.5	2.7	181,055	36.9	15.4	12.7	9.3	7.2	5.9	7.5	3.5	1.5	61.0	37.5	42,393
Västernorrland	N	84.8	2.3	158,985	34.4	16.2	19.2	6.3	6.9	7.0	4.6	3.7	1.7	52.2	46.1	9,716
Västmanland	S	83.5	2.6	176,628	30.5	19.7	20.4	8.0	5.3	5.6	3.7	5.0	1.8	47.5	50.7	5,778
Västra Götaland E	G	86.3	2.6	179,042	28.1	19.9	21.4	5.8	6.5	8.0	4.1	4.4	1.7	44.5	53.8	16,776
Västra Götaland N	G	84.9	2.6	176,511	28.6	19.1	21.6	7.1	5.8	6.9	4.5	4.9	1.5	46.0	52.5	11,545
Västra Götaland S	G	84.7	2.2	146,081	27.3	19.6	20.7	7.1	6.7	7.9	4.3	4.6	1.8	45.4	52.8	10,834
Västra Götaland W	G	87.9	3.8	258,972	25.3	21.5	18.2	6.3	7.4	7.2	6.3	6.3	1.4	45.3	53.2	20,521
Örebro	S	85.9	3.0	203,013	30.3	17.6	17.8	7.8	5.7	6.2	4.9	4.4	5.2	48.8	46.0	5,549
Östergötland	G	85.6	4.6	311,207	28.4	20.6	18.5	7.1	6.8	6.6	5.6	4.9	1.6	47.9	50.5	8,352
Total		84.9	100.0	6,767,429	28.0	19.9	17.5	8.4	7.0	6.2	6.1	5.3	1.6	49.5	48.8	49,484
Source: Sweden's Election Authority

=== By votes ===
Constituency	Land	Turnout	Share	Votes	S	M	SD	V	C	KD	MP	L	Other	Left	Right	Margin
Constituency		%	%													
Blekinge	G	85.6	1.5	104,309	29,892	19,092	25,467	6,113	5,672	7,601	3,985	5,066	1,421	45,662	57,226	11,564
Dalarna	S	85.0	2.8	187,850	55,451	34,477	41,863	10,814	12,200	13,294	8,913	7,579	3,259	87,378	97,213	9,835
Gothenburg	G	82.7	5.6	380,417	103,234	69,144	44,996	57,509	24,749	18,463	34,440	22,580	5,302	219,932	155,183	64,749
Gotland	G	86.9	0.6	41,526	12,920	7,599	5,601	2,799	4,457	2,175	3,274	2,193	508	23,450	17,568	5,882
Gävleborg	N	84.0	2.7	184,537	58,720	32,717	39,727	12,469	11,180	11,411	7,780	7,434	3,099	90,149	91,289	1,140
Halland	G	86.7	3.4	230,235	58,887	53,723	45,064	12,095	17,369	16,228	10,124	13,695	3,050	98,475	128,710	30,235
Jämtland	N	85.1	1.3	86,814	27,343	15,148	15,272	5,227	8,745	4,736	5,762	3,072	1,509	47,077	38,228	8,849
Jönköping	G	85.6	3.5	236,678	62,904	46,733	48,704	14,106	16,567	24,225	9,032	10,874	3,533	102,609	130,536	27,927
Kalmar	G	85.7	2.4	161,796	46,974	30,324	34,565	9,930	10,365	13,575	6,686	6,888	2,489	73,955	85,352	11,397
Kronoberg	G	85.6	1.9	128,547	35,565	25,662	26,144	9,798	8,008	10,256	5,714	5,626	1,774	59,085	67,688	8,603
Malmö	G	80.1	3.1	212,965	61,724	35,076	28,110	36,572	12,475	6,927	19,754	9,820	2,507	130,525	79,933	50,592
Norrbotten	N	83.9	2.4	160,359	60,172	26,250	29,040	10,996	8,238	10,342	7,289	5,380	2,652	86,695	71,012	15,683
Skåne NE	G	83.8	3.0	206,399	47,960	43,027	56,307	12,279	10,953	14,154	7,529	11,348	2,842	78,721	124,836	46,115
Skåne S	G	87.4	4.0	271,168	61,755	63,035	53,632	16,340	21,600	14,469	19,638	17,665	3,034	119,333	148,801	29,468
Skåne W	G	82.4	3.0	200,979	52,352	40,449	48,361	15,713	10,700	10,538	8,803	11,487	2,576	87,568	110,835	23,267
Stockholm	S	85.8	9.6	652,543	171,898	124,639	54,512	85,059	63,857	25,450	72,681	46,361	8,086	393,495	250,962	142,533
Stockholm County	S	83.8	13.1	887,078	229,173	211,111	132,386	71,843	69,312	50,651	50,638	58,824	13,140	420,966	452,972	32,006
Södermanland	S	84.0	2.8	190,962	58,319	37,380	38,535	14,005	10,664	10,977	9,254	8,654	3,174	92,242	95,546	3,304
Uppsala	S	86.8	3.9	265,992	72,015	48,826	41,523	25,773	20,548	17,672	22,199	13,246	4,190	140,535	121,267	19,268
Värmland	S	85.2	2.7	184,781	57,395	37,149	36,422	10,740	11,185	12,668	8,064	8,208	2,950	87,384	94,447	7,063
Västerbotten	N	85.5	2.7	181,055	66,875	27,859	23,081	16,915	13,025	10,697	13,552	6,337	2,714	110,367	67,974	42,393
Västernorrland	N	84.8	2.3	158,985	54,658	25,812	30,481	10,072	10,988	11,156	7,315	5,868	2,635	83,033	73,317	9,716
Västmanland	S	83.5	2.6	176,628	53,813	34,854	35,997	14,087	9,360	9,894	6,600	8,893	3,130	83,860	89,638	5,778
Västra Götaland E	G	86.3	2.6	179,042	50,259	35,717	38,357	10,390	11,654	14,363	7,282	7,924	3,096	79,585	96,361	16,776
Västra Götaland N	G	84.9	2.6	176,511	50,431	33,642	38,116	12,524	10,217	12,248	7,966	8,677	2,690	81,138	92,683	11,545
Västra Götaland S	G	84.7	2.2	146,081	39,892	28,563	30,302	10,365	9,781	11,502	6,299	6,804	2,573	66,337	77,171	10,834
Västra Götaland W	G	87.9	3.8	258,972	65,532	55,689	47,131	16,417	19,093	18,690	16,323	16,376	3,721	117,365	137,886	20,521
Örebro	S	85.9	3.0	203,013	61,609	35,795	36,056	15,874	11,605	12,589	9,901	9,000	10,584	98,989	93,440	5,549
Östergötland	G	85.6	4.6	311,207	88,267	63,956	57,496	21,957	21,213	20,539	17,510	15,308	4,961	148,947	157,299	8,352
Total		84.9	100.0	6,767,429	1,895,989	1,343,448	1,183,248	568,781	475,780	417,490	414,307	361,187	107,199	3,354,857	3,305,373	49,484
Source: Sweden's Election Authority

== 2022–2026 bloc comparison ==
=== Percentage share ===
Constituency	Land	Votes 2022	Left 2022	Right 2022	Win 2022	Votes 2026	Left 2026	Right 2026	Win 2026	Change
Constituency			%	%	%		%	%	%	%
Blekinge	G	103,580	43.33	55.44	12.11	104,309	43.78	54.86	11.08	1.03
Dalarna	S	186,598	47.29	50.85	3.56	187,850	46.51	51.75	5.24	1.68
Gothenburg	G	347,101	54.28	43.05	11.23	380,417	57.81	40.79	17.02	5.79
Gotland	G	41,459	59.20	39.28	19.92	41,526	56.47	42.31	14.16	5.76
Gävleborg	N	182,587	50.34	47.69	2.65	184,537	48.85	49.47	0.62	3.27
Halland	G	221,675	42.94	55.90	12.96	230,235	42.77	55.90	13.13	0.17
Jämtland	N	85,024	55.81	42.92	12.89	86,814	54.23	44.03	10.20	2.69
Jönköping	G	229,125	43.68	55.02	11.34	236,678	43.35	55.15	11.80	0.46
Kalmar	G	161,267	46.27	52.55	6.28	161,796	45.71	52.75	7.04	0.76
Kronoberg	G	124,992	45.51	53.19	7.68	128,547	45.96	52.66	6.70	0.98
Malmö	G	192,043	55.04	41.49	13.55	212,965	61.29	37.53	23.76	10.21
Norrbotten	N	161,455	57.36	41.53	15.83	160,359	54.06	44.28	9.78	6.05
Skåne NE	G	202,890	37.06	61.75	24.69	206,399	38.14	60.48	22.34	2.35
Skåne S	G	259,333	42.48	56.33	13.85	271,168	44.01	54.87	10.86	2.99
Skåne W	G	191,655	40.46	57.78	17.32	200,979	43.57	55.15	11.58	5.74
Stockholm	S	606,751	58.30	39.77	18.53	652,543	60.30	38.46	21.84	3.31
Stockholm County	S	822,510	45.93	52.39	6.46	887,078	47.46	51.06	3.60	2.86
Södermanland	S	184,880	48.08	50.95	2.87	190,962	48.30	50.03	1.73	1.14
Uppsala	S	248,888	50.95	47.38	3.57	265,992	52.83	45.59	7.24	3.67
Värmland	S	182,231	49.58	48.91	0.67	184,781	47.29	51.11	3.82	4.49
Västerbotten	N	177,543	62.46	36.44	26.02	181,055	60.96	37.54	23.42	2.60
Västernorrland	N	158,721	56.04	42.81	13.23	158,985	52.23	46.12	6.11	7.12
Västmanland	S	170,749	46.74	51.97	5.23	176,628	47.48	50.75	3.27	1.96
Västra Götaland E	G	176,526	45.71	53.00	7.29	179,042	44.45	53.82	9.37	2.08
Västra Götaland N	G	173,655	45.79	52.77	6.98	176,511	45.97	52.51	6.54	0.44
Västra Götaland S	G	141,906	45.13	53.30	8.17	146,081	45.41	52.83	7.42	0.75
Västra Götaland W	G	247,863	45.30	53.38	8.08	258,972	45.32	53.24	7.92	0.16
Örebro	S	194,187	49.67	48.72	0.95	203,013	48.76	46.03	2.73	1.78
Östergötland	G	300,600	47.28	51.42	4.14	311,207	47.86	50.54	2.68	1.46
Total		6,477,794	48.87	49.58	0.71	6,767,429	49.57	48.84	0.73	1.44
Source: Sweden's Election Authority

=== By votes ===
Constituency	Land	Votes 2022	Left 2022	Right 2022	Win 2022	Votes 2026	Left 2026	Right 2026	Win 2026	Change
Constituency	#									
Blekinge	G	103,580	44,884	57,428	12,544	104,309	45,662	57,226	11,564	980
Dalarna	S	186,598	88,235	95,612	7,377	187,850	87,378	97,213	9,835	2,458
Gothenburg	G	347,101	188,410	150,533	37,877	380,417	219,932	155,183	64,749	26,872
Gotland	G	41,459	24,544	16,287	8,257	41,526	23,450	17,568	5,882	2,375
Gävleborg	N	182,587	91,911	88,420	3,491	184,537	90,149	91,289	1,140	4,631
Halland	G	221,675	95,182	123,923	28,741	230,235	98,475	128,710	30,235	1,494
Jämtland	N	85,024	47,455	36,489	10,966	86,814	47,077	38,228	8,849	2,117
Jönköping	G	229,125	100,092	126,057	25,965	236,678	102,609	130,536	27,927	1,962
Kalmar	G	161,267	74,613	84,540	9,927	161,796	73,955	85,352	11,397	1,470
Kronoberg	G	124,992	56,890	66,254	9,364	128,547	59,085	67,688	8,603	761
Malmö	G	192,043	105,707	80,205	25,502	212,965	130,525	79,933	50,592	25,090
Norrbotten	N	161,455	92,606	67,057	25,549	160,359	86,695	71,012	15,683	9,866
Skåne NE	G	202,890	75,187	125,045	49,858	206,399	78,721	124,836	46,115	3,743
Skåne S	G	259,333	110,161	146,079	35,918	271,168	119,333	148,801	29,468	6,450
Skåne W	G	191,655	77,537	110,733	33,196	200,979	87,568	110,835	23,267	9,929
Stockholm	S	606,751	353,707	241,326	112,381	652,543	393,495	250,962	142,533	30,152
Stockholm County	S	822,510	377,739	430,937	53,198	887,078	420,966	452,972	32,006	21,192
Södermanland	S	184,880	88,894	93,475	4,581	190,962	92,242	95,546	3,304	1,277
Uppsala	S	248,888	126,832	117,925	8,907	265,992	140,535	121,267	19,268	10,361
Värmland	S	182,231	90,352	89,979	373	184,781	87,384	94,447	7,063	7,436
Västerbotten	N	177,543	110,895	64,699	46,196	181,055	110,367	67,974	42,393	3,803
Västernorrland	N	158,721	88,944	67,944	21,000	158,985	83,033	73,317	9,716	11,284
Västmanland	S	170,749	79,809	88,740	8,931	176,628	83,860	89,638	5,778	3,153
Västra Götaland E	G	176,526	80,692	93,570	12,878	179,042	79,585	96,361	16,776	3,898
Västra Götaland N	G	173,655	79,520	91,630	12,110	176,511	81,138	92,683	11,545	565
Västra Götaland S	G	141,906	64,049	75,639	11,590	146,081	66,337	77,171	10,834	756
Västra Götaland W	G	247,863	112,284	132,303	20,019	258,972	117,365	137,886	20,521	502
Örebro	S	194,187	96,463	94,608	1,855	203,013	98,989	93,440	5,549	3,694
Östergötland	G	300,600	142,117	154,570	12,453	311,207	148,947	157,299	8,352	4,101
Total		6,477,794	3,165,711	3,212,007	46,296	6,767,429	3,354,857	3,305,373	49,484	95,780
Source: Sweden's Election Authority

== Results by municipality ==
Sweden is divided into 21 counties, most of whom are similar to the constituencies underneath and form the 290 municipalities and 6,626 electoral districts. The counties of Sweden are Blekinge, Dalarna, Gotland, Gävleborg, Halland, Jämtland, Jönköping, Kalmar, Kronoberg, Norrbotten, Skåne, Stockholm, Södermanland, Uppsala, Värmland, Västerbotten, Västernorrland, Västmanland, Västra Götaland, Örebro and Östergötland.

=== Blekinge ===
Location	Turnout	Share	Votes	S	M	SD	V	C	KD	MP	L	Other	L-vote	R-vote	Left	Right	Margin
Location	%	%		%	%	%	%	%	%	%	%	%			%	%	
Karlshamn	84.6	20.0	20,830	29.4	17.3	25.1	6.3	5.2	6.9	4.2	4.3	1.2	9,402	11,175	45.1	53.6	1,773
Karlskrona	87.4	43.2	45,110	29.7	20.1	20.2	5.6	6.0	7.3	4.4	5.3	1.3	20,634	23,898	45.7	53.0	3,264
Olofström	80.4	7.6	7,881	30.3	15.7	29.5	6.2	4.6	5.9	2.2	3.6	2.0	3,406	4,315	43.2	54.8	909
Ronneby	85.2	17.9	18,671	27.6	15.8	26.2	7.2	5.7	8.0	3.5	4.6	1.4	8,212	10,200	44.0	54.6	1,988
Sölvesborg	85.2	11.3	11,817	24.0	19.1	32.8	3.7	3.9	7.6	2.2	5.2	1.4	4,008	7,638	33.9	64.6	3,630
Total	85.6	100.0	104,309	28.7	18.3	24.4	5.9	5.4	7.3	3.8	4.9	1.4	45,662	57,226	43.8	54.9	11,564
Source: Sweden's Election Authority

=== Dalarna ===
Location	Turnout	Share	Votes	S	M	SD	V	C	KD	MP	L	Other	L-vote	R-vote	Left	Right	Margin
Location	%	%		%	%	%	%	%	%	%	%	%			%	%	
Avesta	84.0	7.7	14,446	32.1	18.7	24.4	6.2	4.9	5.9	2.6	3.6	1.5	6,636	7,597	45.9	52.6	961
Borlänge	83.7	17.5	32,868	33.0	18.0	20.8	7.7	5.2	5.1	4.6	3.9	1.9	16,554	15,688	50.4	47.7	866
Falun	87.2	21.6	40,494	29.1	19.6	16.4	6.0	8.4	6.8	7.7	4.6	1.5	20,713	19,183	51.2	47.4	1,530
Gagnef	86.2	3.6	6,807	25.5	16.7	24.8	4.0	8.0	10.3	4.9	4.2	1.7	2,883	3,807	42.4	55.9	924
Hedemora	82.6	5.1	9,636	28.2	17.1	25.1	5.8	6.3	7.4	4.3	3.4	2.3	4,299	5,113	44.6	53.1	814
Leksand	87.3	5.9	11,150	26.7	19.9	18.3	4.7	8.5	10.1	5.4	5.0	1.3	5,061	5,939	45.4	53.3	878
Ludvika	83.1	8.6	16,144	32.4	16.9	24.6	7.4	4.7	5.7	3.3	3.1	1.9	7,719	8,118	47.8	50.3	399
Malung-Sälen	85.3	3.6	6,723	25.2	21.8	27.5	3.5	5.0	9.2	2.3	4.3	1.2	2,421	4,219	36.0	62.8	1,798
Mora	84.8	7.3	13,699	27.3	18.5	25.1	4.4	6.7	7.6	4.2	4.6	1.6	5,834	7,649	42.6	55.8	1,815
Orsa	83.2	2.5	4,612	25.3	15.3	27.4	6.2	6.6	7.1	4.4	4.3	3.2	1,963	2,500	42.6	54.2	537
Rättvik	85.2	4.1	7,637	26.4	19.5	25.0	3.4	6.6	8.4	4.6	4.0	1.9	3,133	4,356	41.0	57.0	1,223
Smedjebacken	85.1	3.9	7,254	34.2	17.4	26.2	4.5	4.0	5.5	2.9	3.3	1.9	3,313	3,801	45.7	52.4	488
Säter	87.2	4.0	7,590	28.4	18.8	23.8	4.5	7.5	7.6	3.9	4.0	1.5	3,362	4,111	44.3	54.2	749
Vansbro	82.1	2.3	4,304	26.3	15.9	26.3	5.1	6.7	12.1	2.2	3.1	2.3	1,733	2,470	40.3	57.4	737
Älvdalen	84.3	2.4	4,486	25.3	13.8	32.7	3.4	7.7	9.4	2.8	3.5	1.6	1,754	2,662	39.1	59.3	908
Total	85.0	100.0	187,850	29.5	18.4	22.3	5.8	6.5	7.1	4.7	4.0	1.7	87,378	97,213	46.5	51.8	9,835
Source: Sweden's Election Authority

=== Gotland ===
Location	Turnout	Share	Votes	S	M	SD	V	C	KD	MP	L	Other	L-vote	R-vote	Left	Right	Margin
Location	%	%		%	%	%	%	%	%	%	%	%			%	%	
Gotland	86.9	100.0	41,526	31.1	18.3	13.5	6.7	10.7	5.2	7.9	5.3	1.2	23,450	17,568	56.5	42.3	5,882
Total	86.9	100.0	41,526	31.1	18.3	13.5	6.7	10.7	5.2	7.9	5.3	1.2	23,450	17,568	56.5	42.3	5,882
Source: Sweden's Election Authority

=== Gävleborg ===
Location	Turnout	Share	Votes	S	M	SD	V	C	KD	MP	L	Other	L-vote	R-vote	Left	Right	Margin
Location	%	%		%	%	%	%	%	%	%	%	%			%	%	
Bollnäs	82.3	9.1	16,753	32.2	15.9	21.9	6.2	7.3	7.1	4.1	3.8	1.5	8,342	8,155	49.8	48.7	187
Gävle	85.1	36.8	67,942	31.5	19.9	19.6	8.0	4.9	5.7	4.7	4.5	1.5	33,281	33,664	49.0	49.5	383
Hofors	82.0	3.2	5,865	31.5	15.5	26.3	8.3	4.2	7.1	2.4	3.0	1.8	2,716	3,042	46.3	51.9	326
Hudiksvall	83.6	13.4	24,644	32.6	17.1	19.1	6.2	8.6	5.4	5.3	3.7	2.0	12,987	11,167	52.7	45.3	1,820
Ljusdal	82.9	6.5	12,022	28.2	17.3	24.5	4.7	7.8	6.3	4.5	4.7	2.0	5,435	6,352	45.2	52.8	917
Nordanstig	82.3	3.2	5,884	29.9	15.6	25.7	5.2	7.3	6.5	3.8	3.4	2.6	2,716	3,016	46.2	51.3	300
Ockelbo	85.8	2.1	3,905	30.9	14.6	24.6	4.2	7.1	8.2	4.4	3.8	2.2	1,817	2,001	46.5	51.2	184
Ovanåker	83.8	4.0	7,372	29.1	15.5	23.2	4.2	8.5	12.0	2.7	3.6	1.2	3,279	4,005	44.5	54.3	726
Sandviken	84.2	13.2	24,446	33.2	17.4	23.8	6.9	4.4	5.4	3.3	3.9	1.7	11,697	12,334	47.8	50.5	637
Söderhamn	82.7	8.5	15,704	34.6	15.8	22.8	6.2	5.9	6.0	3.4	3.6	1.7	7,879	7,553	50.2	48.1	326
Total	84.0	100.0	184,537	31.8	17.7	21.5	6.8	6.1	6.2	4.2	4.0	1.7	90,149	91,289	48.9	49.5	1,140
Source: Sweden's Election Authority

=== Halland ===
Location	Turnout	Share	Votes	S	M	SD	V	C	KD	MP	L	Other	L-vote	R-vote	Left	Right	Margin
Location	%	%		%	%	%	%	%	%	%	%	%			%	%	
Falkenberg	85.1	13.5	31,010	28.1	20.8	19.2	6.0	8.8	6.3	4.3	5.1	1.3	14,642	15,972	47.2	51.5	1,330
Halmstad	84.4	29.8	68,687	29.5	21.2	18.6	7.1	6.4	6.5	4.3	5.1	1.3	32,456	35,314	47.3	51.4	2,858
Hylte	82.1	2.6	5,986	26.3	15.8	25.7	7.8	8.3	8.4	3.0	3.3	1.4	2,716	3,185	45.4	53.2	469
Kungsbacka	90.1	25.8	59,514	18.2	29.8	19.3	3.2	7.8	7.5	4.6	8.2	1.4	20,025	38,658	33.6	65.0	18,633
Laholm	85.6	7.5	17,379	23.0	20.3	26.6	4.6	7.4	8.6	3.2	4.9	1.4	6,642	10,490	38.2	60.4	3,848
Varberg	88.4	20.7	47,659	28.4	22.0	18.1	4.6	8.1	7.0	5.0	5.6	1.2	21,994	25,091	46.1	52.6	3,097
Total	86.7	100.0	230,235	25.6	23.3	19.6	5.3	7.5	7.0	4.4	5.9	1.3	98,475	128,710	42.8	55.9	30,235
Source: Sweden's Election Authority

=== Jämtland ===
Location	Turnout	Share	Votes	S	M	SD	V	C	KD	MP	L	Other	L-vote	R-vote	Left	Right	Margin
Location	%	%		%	%	%	%	%	%	%	%	%			%	%	
Berg	83.6	5.3	4,569	27.4	20.4	22.5	4.6	10.2	4.7	4.9	3.2	2.1	2,153	2,318	47.1	50.7	165
Bräcke	80.4	4.3	3,725	33.4	16.0	23.7	5.2	7.8	5.2	3.5	2.7	2.4	1,864	1,771	50.0	47.5	93
Härjedalen	83.8	7.7	6,657	28.8	17.8	22.4	4.4	8.1	8.0	4.7	3.7	2.1	3,062	3,456	46.0	51.9	394
Krokom	86.9	11.7	10,179	28.0	17.7	19.1	4.8	11.7	6.4	7.1	3.4	1.9	5,233	4,753	51.4	46.7	480
Ragunda	82.2	3.7	3,192	33.7	12.9	26.1	5.6	6.8	7.6	2.9	2.6	1.8	1,589	1,545	49.8	48.4	44
Strömsund	83.8	8.1	7,005	31.9	17.6	25.7	6.0	7.0	5.0	2.4	2.6	1.7	3,319	3,565	47.4	50.9	246
Åre	87.0	9.6	8,293	26.8	17.8	12.7	5.4	14.5	5.8	11.3	4.1	1.7	4,807	3,349	58.0	40.4	1,458
Östersund	85.5	49.8	43,194	33.7	17.4	14.4	6.9	10.1	4.9	7.3	3.8	1.6	25,050	17,471	58.0	40.4	7,579
Total	85.1	100.0	86,814	31.5	17.4	17.6	6.0	10.1	5.5	6.6	3.5	1.7	47,077	38,228	54.2	44.0	8,849
Source: Sweden's Election Authority

=== Jönköping ===
Location	Turnout	Share	Votes	S	M	SD	V	C	KD	MP	L	Other	L-vote	R-vote	Left	Right	Margin
Location	%	%		%	%	%	%	%	%	%	%	%			%	%	
Aneby	88.1	1.9	4,529	22.2	18.1	23.9	4.2	8.8	13.2	3.0	4.5	2.1	1,730	2,705	38.2	59.7	975
Eksjö	86.1	4.9	11,622	26.0	19.0	20.8	5.3	8.6	9.5	4.2	5.1	1.6	5,122	6,312	44.1	54.3	1,190
Gislaved	82.2	7.3	17,329	25.7	20.4	23.2	7.2	6.7	8.9	2.3	4.3	1.3	7,271	9,838	42.0	56.8	2,567
Gnosjö	81.9	2.3	5,448	23.2	20.0	22.7	4.4	6.3	14.4	2.2	4.4	2.3	1,969	3,353	36.1	61.5	1,384
Habo	91.7	3.7	8,830	22.8	21.6	22.4	3.2	7.3	12.8	3.9	4.6	1.4	3,294	5,416	37.3	61.3	2,122
Jönköping	86.2	40.5	95,900	27.7	20.2	17.4	6.6	7.3	9.9	4.7	4.9	1.4	44,362	50,235	46.3	52.4	5,873
Mullsjö	87.6	2.1	4,975	23.6	17.1	25.6	4.1	6.7	12.5	4.6	3.8	1.9	1,942	2,937	39.0	59.0	995
Nässjö	84.5	8.3	19,681	27.6	17.4	24.4	6.3	5.7	9.6	3.3	4.4	1.6	8,415	10,956	42.8	55.7	2,541
Sävsjö	85.9	3.0	7,187	20.1	19.2	25.9	6.0	6.4	13.3	2.4	4.9	1.8	2,509	4,550	34.9	63.3	2,041
Tranås	86.1	5.1	12,185	30.2	19.2	21.0	5.8	5.9	8.0	4.1	4.6	1.2	5,614	6,419	46.1	52.7	805
Vaggeryd	86.4	4.0	9,376	25.9	18.8	23.4	5.2	6.9	11.5	2.9	3.7	1.7	3,832	5,383	40.9	57.4	1,551
Vetlanda	84.8	7.4	17,447	24.9	18.4	24.4	5.9	6.8	10.7	2.8	4.3	1.8	7,050	10,084	40.4	57.8	3,034
Värnamo	84.8	9.4	22,169	27.5	21.8	19.5	5.0	7.1	10.0	3.3	4.4	1.5	9,499	12,348	42.8	55.7	2,849
Total	85.6	100.0	236,678	26.6	19.7	20.6	6.0	7.0	10.2	3.8	4.6	1.5	102,609	130,536	43.4	55.2	27,927
Source: Sweden's Election Authority

=== Kalmar ===
Location	Turnout	Share	Votes	S	M	SD	V	C	KD	MP	L	Other	L-vote	R-vote	Left	Right	Margin
Location	%	%		%	%	%	%	%	%	%	%	%			%	%	
Borgholm	86.8	4.8	7,791	24.1	20.0	21.7	4.1	8.8	9.3	5.7	4.9	1.3	3,332	4,357	42.8	55.9	1,025
Emmaboda	84.2	3.4	5,547	31.2	16.0	24.7	6.9	5.9	7.1	3.0	3.8	1.5	2,606	2,858	47.0	51.5	252
Hultsfred	82.0	5.0	8,082	29.6	13.4	23.1	7.9	6.1	12.9	2.3	3.0	1.8	3,697	4,237	45.7	52.4	540
Högsby	81.8	1.9	3,020	27.2	11.9	27.0	5.5	5.9	15.4	2.9	2.9	1.3	1,255	1,726	41.6	57.2	471
Kalmar	86.5	29.7	48,061	29.6	21.5	17.2	7.1	6.2	6.8	5.5	4.7	1.4	23,250	24,150	48.4	50.2	900
Mönsterås	86.1	5.4	8,597	29.6	14.9	28.0	5.1	5.0	9.6	2.6	3.5	1.6	3,641	4,818	42.4	56.0	1,177
Mörbylånga	89.5	7.0	11,322	25.5	21.7	19.2	4.1	8.9	8.1	6.3	5.1	1.1	5,068	6,132	44.8	54.2	1,064
Nybro	84.5	7.8	12,611	28.7	17.1	23.7	7.9	6.0	7.9	2.7	3.7	2.1	5,732	6,610	45.5	52.4	878
Oskarshamn	85.8	11.0	17,763	29.0	18.0	25.0	5.4	4.5	9.9	2.3	4.2	1.7	7,318	10,144	41.2	57.1	2,826
Torsås	87.2	2.9	4,738	23.7	17.2	27.9	4.6	7.6	8.7	4.0	4.6	1.8	1,886	2,765	39.8	58.4	879
Vimmerby	85.6	6.3	10,121	28.6	18.6	22.1	5.4	7.4	9.7	3.3	3.3	1.7	4,522	5,423	44.7	53.6	901
Västervik	84.2	14.9	24,143	32.0	17.9	20.6	5.7	6.6	7.3	3.9	4.4	1.5	11,648	12,132	48.2	50.3	484
Total	85.7	100.0	161,796	29.0	18.7	21.4	6.1	6.4	8.4	4.1	4.3	1.5	73,955	85,352	45.7	52.8	11,397
Source: Sweden's Election Authority

=== Kronoberg ===
Location	Turnout	Share	Votes	S	M	SD	V	C	KD	MP	L	Other	L-vote	R-vote	Left	Right	Margin
Location	%	%		%	%	%	%	%	%	%	%	%			%	%	
Alvesta	84.5	9.7	12,407	26.5	18.9	24.8	6.7	6.0	7.7	3.8	4.0	1.4	5,337	6,893	43.0	55.6	1,556
Lessebo	84.8	3.9	4,960	33.1	17.1	20.7	10.1	5.1	6.5	3.4	3.0	1.0	2,562	2,348	51.7	47.3	214
Ljungby	83.6	13.7	17,623	24.9	17.3	24.9	5.7	6.1	11.7	3.2	4.4	1.6	7,052	10,287	40.0	58.4	3,235
Markaryd	81.5	4.6	5,914	23.1	16.7	31.0	5.9	4.3	11.9	2.1	3.8	1.3	2,090	3,747	35.3	63.4	1,657
Tingsryd	84.8	5.9	7,540	25.1	19.0	27.5	4.9	6.6	8.8	2.9	3.9	1.4	2,970	4,461	39.4	59.2	1,491
Uppvidinge	84.3	4.2	5,420	24.6	15.7	28.5	6.5	6.8	9.5	3.0	3.8	1.6	2,213	3,118	40.8	57.5	905
Växjö	87.2	50.1	64,352	29.1	21.7	15.6	9.0	6.3	6.6	5.6	4.8	1.3	32,156	31,357	50.0	48.7	799
Älmhult	84.6	8.0	10,331	28.1	21.2	20.7	5.8	7.5	7.4	4.2	3.7	1.4	4,705	5,477	45.5	53.0	772
Total	85.6	100.0	128,547	27.7	20.0	20.3	7.6	6.2	8.0	4.4	4.4	1.4	59,085	67,688	46.0	52.7	8,603
Source: Sweden's Election Authority

=== Norrbotten ===
Location	Turnout	Share	Votes	S	M	SD	V	C	KD	MP	L	Other	L-vote	R-vote	Left	Right	Margin
Location	%	%		%	%	%	%	%	%	%	%	%			%	%	
Arjeplog	84.0	1.1	1,693	32.2	13.9	22.7	6.6	4.4	7.1	6.1	5.4	1.5	835	832	49.3	49.1	3
Arvidsjaur	83.8	2.4	3,918	36.5	15.8	20.8	6.5	5.8	6.6	2.7	3.7	1.7	2,015	1,837	51.4	46.9	178
Boden	84.6	11.4	18,229	38.1	17.5	19.7	5.4	5.3	5.7	3.3	3.4	1.6	9,480	8,450	52.0	46.4	1,030
Gällivare	80.8	6.6	10,662	35.1	15.0	24.4	7.1	2.4	7.0	4.7	2.2	2.1	5,258	5,185	49.3	48.6	73
Haparanda	68.7	2.7	4,319	31.5	15.9	28.7	5.2	5.9	6.0	2.1	3.1	1.7	1,930	2,316	44.7	53.6	386
Jokkmokk	80.0	1.8	2,881	33.6	11.8	17.5	7.4	3.8	6.5	14.4	2.9	2.1	1,707	1,114	59.3	38.7	593
Kalix	82.7	6.2	9,982	40.2	16.5	21.2	4.2	4.6	6.7	2.6	2.7	1.2	5,151	4,708	51.6	47.2	443
Kiruna	81.4	8.4	13,437	35.8	14.2	19.8	8.1	2.7	7.7	6.9	2.5	2.3	7,186	5,940	53.5	44.2	1,246
Luleå	86.2	33.5	53,696	36.1	18.3	15.0	7.4	5.8	6.3	5.6	4.2	1.4	29,429	23,493	54.8	43.8	5,936
Pajala	78.9	2.2	3,458	31.3	10.3	24.6	14.6	3.7	8.6	2.3	2.4	2.3	1,792	1,588	51.8	45.9	204
Piteå	86.9	18.0	28,802	42.6	15.4	15.5	6.5	5.9	5.8	3.6	3.0	1.6	16,904	11,428	58.7	39.7	5,476
Älvsbyn	83.3	3.1	4,961	41.6	16.8	18.3	6.0	5.1	5.5	2.3	2.6	1.8	2,730	2,140	55.0	43.1	590
Överkalix	81.1	1.2	1,982	36.5	13.4	20.4	7.6	8.4	7.6	1.2	3.1	1.8	1,064	883	53.7	44.6	181
Övertorneå	76.2	1.5	2,339	34.5	13.6	20.1	7.1	8.4	10.4	1.9	2.8	1.2	1,214	1,098	51.9	46.9	116
Total	83.9	100.0	160,359	37.5	16.4	18.1	6.9	5.1	6.4	4.5	3.4	1.7	86,695	71,012	54.1	44.3	15,683
Source: Sweden's Election Authority

=== Skåne ===
==== Malmö ====
Location	Turnout	Share	Votes	S	M	SD	V	C	KD	MP	L	Other	L-vote	R-vote	Left	Right	Margin
Location	%	%		%	%	%	%	%	%	%	%	%			%	%	
Malmö	80.1	100.0	212,965	29.0	16.5	13.2	17.2	5.9	3.3	9.3	4.6	1.2	130,525	79,933	61.3	37.5	50,592
Total	80.1	100.0	212,965	29.0	16.5	13.2	17.2	5.9	3.3	9.3	4.6	1.2	130,525	79,933	61.3	37.5	50,592
Source: Sweden's Election Authority

==== Skåne NE ====
Location	Turnout	Share	Votes	S	M	SD	V	C	KD	MP	L	Other	L-vote	R-vote	Left	Right	Margin
Location	%	%		%	%	%	%	%	%	%	%	%			%	%	
Bromölla	83.9	3.9	8,055	24.9	18.1	34.7	5.3	2.7	6.1	2.1	4.2	1.9	2,818	5,081	35.0	63.1	2,263
Båstad	87.2	5.4	11,240	17.8	26.5	19.8	3.1	9.4	8.5	5.3	8.2	1.3	4,005	7,088	35.6	63.1	3,083
Hässleholm	83.2	15.9	32,837	22.7	18.9	28.2	6.5	5.4	7.6	3.5	5.5	1.7	12,523	19,765	38.1	60.2	7,242
Klippan	81.3	5.1	10,604	21.2	17.3	36.7	4.9	4.1	7.2	3.1	4.0	1.5	3,535	6,909	33.3	65.2	3,374
Kristianstad	84.0	26.9	55,506	24.7	22.1	24.0	7.9	4.7	5.9	3.2	6.4	1.1	22,460	32,415	40.5	58.4	9,955
Osby	83.5	3.9	8,066	25.2	18.1	31.3	4.3	4.3	7.7	3.2	4.5	1.4	2,984	4,968	37.0	61.6	1,984
Perstorp	78.1	2.0	4,026	25.5	15.7	34.8	7.4	3.9	6.0	2.1	3.3	1.3	1,566	2,407	38.9	59.8	841
Simrishamn	84.3	6.3	13,014	22.3	20.0	22.3	5.9	7.3	6.4	7.8	6.7	1.2	5,630	7,226	43.3	55.5	1,596
Tomelilla	84.1	4.3	8,777	20.7	19.0	32.1	5.8	6.3	5.7	4.7	4.2	1.5	3,293	5,355	37.5	61.0	2,062
Åstorp	79.4	4.4	9,127	27.0	17.4	32.5	7.7	3.1	5.6	2.2	3.5	1.2	3,642	5,378	39.9	58.9	1,736
Ängelholm	86.3	14.6	30,214	23.1	24.8	24.2	3.8	6.3	7.4	3.9	5.5	1.1	11,203	18,666	37.1	61.8	7,463
Örkelljunga	82.7	3.1	6,316	19.0	16.4	35.4	4.0	4.6	12.0	2.2	3.8	2.7	1,879	4,266	29.7	67.5	2,387
Östra Göinge	83.8	4.2	8,617	24.3	20.7	31.1	5.8	4.4	5.9	2.4	3.9	1.4	3,183	5,312	36.9	61.6	2,129
Total	83.8	100.0	206,399	23.2	20.8	27.3	5.9	5.3	6.9	3.6	5.5	1.4	78,721	124,836	38.1	60.5	46,115
Source: Sweden's Election Authority

==== Skåne S ====
Location	Turnout	Share	Votes	S	M	SD	V	C	KD	MP	L	Other	L-vote	R-vote	Left	Right	Margin
Location	%	%		%	%	%	%	%	%	%	%	%			%	%	
Burlöv	76.7	4.0	10,762	33.6	16.1	19.6	12.8	4.7	3.4	4.5	4.0	1.2	5,993	4,644	55.7	43.2	1,349
Kävlinge	89.4	8.0	21,582	21.9	26.6	22.8	3.5	7.4	5.6	4.8	6.2	1.1	8,122	13,227	37.6	61.3	5,105
Lomma	91.9	6.3	17,034	19.1	29.8	14.7	2.1	11.9	6.2	5.6	10.7	0.8	6,594	10,297	38.7	60.4	3,703
Lund	88.2	32.2	87,425	25.7	17.5	10.1	10.0	10.9	3.9	14.0	6.8	1.1	52,962	33,458	60.6	38.3	19,504
Sjöbo	84.2	4.6	12,441	16.4	20.5	37.5	3.4	5.2	7.3	3.6	4.4	1.5	3,570	8,681	28.7	69.8	5,111
Skurup	85.0	4.0	10,842	21.0	23.4	30.8	5.0	4.8	5.6	3.3	4.6	1.5	3,702	6,978	34.1	64.4	3,276
Staffanstorp	88.5	6.4	17,473	23.6	28.5	20.2	4.4	6.8	5.1	4.6	5.8	1.0	6,880	10,413	39.4	59.6	3,533
Svedala	88.9	5.5	14,975	21.5	24.8	28.6	3.8	5.4	5.7	3.8	5.2	1.2	5,164	9,634	34.5	64.3	4,470
Trelleborg	84.4	11.1	30,004	24.9	21.4	29.1	4.9	4.7	5.9	3.1	4.8	1.1	11,306	18,360	37.7	61.2	7,054
Vellinge	91.1	9.8	26,489	11.6	36.8	21.2	1.4	7.9	7.4	3.1	9.7	0.9	6,375	19,877	24.1	75.0	13,502
Ystad	86.1	8.2	22,141	24.6	24.5	23.0	4.4	5.8	6.3	4.4	5.9	1.1	8,665	13,232	39.1	59.8	4,567
Total	87.4	100.0	271,168	22.8	23.2	19.8	6.0	8.0	5.3	7.2	6.5	1.1	119,333	148,801	44.0	54.9	29,468
Source: Sweden's Election Authority

==== Skåne W ====
Location	Turnout	Share	Votes	S	M	SD	V	C	KD	MP	L	Other	L-vote	R-vote	Left	Right	Margin
Location	%	%		%	%	%	%	%	%	%	%	%			%	%	
Bjuv	78.8	4.4	8,908	28.4	15.9	35.3	6.1	2.5	5.4	1.7	3.3	1.4	3,447	5,332	38.7	59.9	1,885
Eslöv	83.6	10.6	21,287	26.3	18.3	25.8	7.9	5.7	5.2	4.9	4.3	1.5	9,526	11,448	44.8	53.8	1,922
Helsingborg	81.3	46.4	93,203	27.0	21.3	21.7	9.4	5.1	4.9	4.0	5.3	1.2	42,498	49,624	45.6	53.2	7,126
Höganäs	87.5	9.5	19,144	21.3	26.3	19.5	3.7	8.2	6.7	5.5	7.6	1.1	7,421	11,509	38.8	60.1	4,088
Hörby	84.6	5.0	10,085	20.3	17.2	34.8	3.8	6.2	7.3	3.5	5.3	1.6	3,408	6,516	33.8	64.6	3,108
Höör	86.3	5.7	11,363	21.0	19.7	25.9	5.8	6.2	6.5	8.3	4.7	1.9	4,694	6,452	41.3	56.8	1,758
Landskrona	80.5	14.1	28,299	30.2	17.1	22.8	8.7	3.9	3.9	3.7	8.5	1.2	13,152	14,804	46.5	52.3	1,652
Svalöv	84.5	4.3	8,690	22.3	15.9	32.4	5.6	5.9	6.1	5.5	4.9	1.4	3,422	5,150	39.4	59.3	1,728
Total	82.4	100.0	200,979	26.0	20.1	24.1	7.8	5.3	5.2	4.4	5.7	1.3	87,568	110,835	43.6	55.1	23,267
Source: Sweden's Election Authority

=== Stockholm area ===
==== Stockholm ====
Location	Turnout	Share	Votes	S	M	SD	V	C	KD	MP	L	Other	L-vote	R-vote	Left	Right	Margin
Location	%	%		%	%	%	%	%	%	%	%	%			%	%	
Northeast	89.4	17.9	116,629	16.2	32.2	8.1	4.2	12.7	5.7	7.0	12.7	1.0	46,847	68,561	40.2	58.8	21,714
Northwest	76.4	13.6	88,470	33.2	13.9	9.0	23.9	5.4	3.4	5.9	3.7	1.5	60,547	26,597	68.4	30.1	33,950
South	89.6	19.3	125,799	27.8	15.0	7.2	12.0	11.1	3.0	16.2	6.6	1.1	84,370	40,088	67.1	31.9	44,282
Southeast	84.1	15.8	103,091	30.8	11.9	9.5	18.8	6.5	2.8	14.2	3.9	1.5	72,475	29,062	70.3	28.2	43,413
Southwest	85.3	16.6	108,081	30.5	14.3	8.3	16.5	8.3	3.2	13.0	4.7	1.2	73,784	32,953	68.3	30.5	40,831
West	89.1	16.9	110,473	21.6	25.5	8.4	6.1	13.2	5.1	9.2	9.7	1.2	55,472	53,701	50.2	48.6	1,771
Total	85.8	100.0	652,543	26.3	19.1	8.4	13.0	9.8	3.8	11.1	7.1	1.2	393,495	250,962	60.3	38.5	142,533
Source: Sweden's Election Authority

==== Stockholm County ====
Location	Turnout	Share	Votes	S	M	SD	V	C	KD	MP	L	Other	L-vote	R-vote	Left	Right	Margin
Location	%	%		%	%	%	%	%	%	%	%	%			%	%	
Botkyrka	76.0	5.5	48,889	33.6	16.0	15.9	15.0	4.0	5.9	4.4	3.1	2.1	27,877	20,001	57.0	40.9	7,876
Danderyd	89.6	2.5	22,584	10.9	39.0	8.4	2.4	11.9	7.0	4.3	15.2	0.9	6,648	15,739	29.4	69.7	9,091
Ekerö	90.4	2.1	18,982	20.0	27.0	16.2	3.8	10.4	6.4	6.8	8.0	1.3	7,802	10,930	41.1	57.6	3,128
Haninge	80.5	6.3	55,481	30.1	20.4	19.7	9.8	4.7	5.0	4.2	4.6	1.7	27,031	27,531	48.7	49.6	500
Huddinge	82.7	7.4	65,578	29.3	20.5	14.0	11.5	6.9	4.5	6.6	5.3	1.4	35,635	29,046	54.3	44.3	6,589
Järfälla	81.0	5.7	50,956	31.3	19.2	13.6	13.4	5.7	5.0	5.2	5.0	1.7	28,299	21,782	55.5	42.7	6,517
Lidingö	88.1	3.7	32,523	15.1	33.9	9.4	3.5	12.0	6.5	5.6	13.0	1.1	11,768	20,411	36.2	62.8	8,643
Nacka	88.4	8.3	73,529	22.5	26.9	9.5	6.2	12.1	5.3	7.9	8.6	1.1	35,809	36,923	48.7	50.2	1,114
Norrtälje	84.5	5.0	44,480	25.9	21.0	23.0	5.0	6.6	6.1	5.1	5.4	1.7	18,976	24,732	42.7	55.6	5,756
Nykvarn	87.8	0.9	7,841	21.1	28.8	25.2	3.2	5.5	6.0	3.3	5.4	1.5	2,600	5,126	33.2	65.4	2,526
Nynäshamn	83.0	2.1	18,380	27.8	19.7	23.9	6.3	5.1	6.0	5.1	4.5	1.6	8,146	9,933	44.3	54.0	1,787
Salem	85.5	1.2	10,448	25.0	23.8	18.1	6.3	7.7	6.3	5.5	5.6	1.7	4,652	5,621	44.5	53.8	969
Sigtuna	79.1	3.1	27,668	27.7	21.7	18.4	10.8	4.7	6.4	4.0	4.7	1.6	13,062	14,167	47.2	51.2	1,105
Sollentuna	85.6	5.3	47,367	26.3	24.1	10.3	8.1	10.4	5.6	6.2	7.6	1.4	24,156	22,570	51.0	47.6	1,586
Solna	85.2	6.0	53,290	28.0	21.8	10.4	9.9	9.5	4.6	7.9	6.6	1.4	29,463	23,106	55.3	43.4	6,357
Sundbyberg	83.2	3.8	34,138	31.3	19.1	11.0	12.6	7.8	4.2	6.9	5.8	1.3	19,995	13,708	58.6	40.2	6,287
Södertälje	74.6	5.8	51,456	27.9	19.8	20.2	8.9	3.9	8.1	5.1	3.9	2.1	23,616	26,776	45.9	52.0	3,160
Tyresö	86.8	3.6	31,644	26.7	24.6	16.2	6.0	7.5	4.9	6.4	6.3	1.4	14,745	16,444	46.6	52.0	1,699
Täby	88.9	5.9	51,906	17.7	33.9	10.8	3.3	11.2	6.4	4.9	10.7	1.1	19,233	32,082	37.1	61.8	12,849
Upplands-Bro	81.9	2.0	18,098	29.2	20.5	18.1	10.5	5.0	5.9	3.8	5.1	1.9	8,769	8,979	48.5	49.6	210
Upplands Väsby	80.6	3.2	28,028	30.5	20.8	17.2	10.4	5.5	5.4	3.9	4.5	1.7	14,134	13,416	50.4	47.9	718
Vallentuna	87.8	2.6	22,666	21.8	26.4	18.1	4.2	8.3	6.5	6.0	7.0	1.6	9,120	13,175	40.2	58.1	4,055
Vaxholm	90.6	0.9	8,373	18.5	29.2	12.9	2.6	12.4	7.1	6.1	9.6	1.0	3,365	4,926	40.2	58.8	1,561
Värmdö	89.1	3.5	30,933	23.1	25.9	16.5	4.7	8.7	5.8	7.2	6.7	1.3	13,516	17,005	43.7	55.0	3,489
Österåker	87.9	3.6	31,840	22.1	28.7	16.5	4.4	7.8	6.4	5.1	7.6	1.4	12,549	18,843	39.4	59.2	6,294
Total	83.8	100.0	887,078	25.8	23.8	14.9	8.1	7.8	5.7	5.7	6.6	1.5	420,966	452,972	47.5	51.1	32,006
Source: Sweden's Election Authority

=== Södermanland ===
Location	Turnout	Share	Votes	S	M	SD	V	C	KD	MP	L	Other	L-vote	R-vote	Left	Right	Margin
Location	%	%		%	%	%	%	%	%	%	%	%			%	%	
Eskilstuna	81.6	33.9	64,831	31.6	18.2	20.6	9.1	4.7	5.6	4.1	4.3	1.6	32,149	31,628	49.6	48.8	521
Flen	82.3	5.0	9,594	29.9	16.3	21.3	8.7	5.8	6.6	5.4	4.6	1.5	4,775	4,679	49.8	48.8	96
Gnesta	85.8	3.8	7,319	25.9	19.6	19.1	7.3	6.9	5.4	9.5	4.1	2.2	3,626	3,533	49.5	48.3	93
Katrineholm	83.4	11.4	21,748	35.3	17.7	19.0	7.2	5.3	5.5	4.0	4.2	1.8	11,276	10,088	51.8	46.4	1,188
Nyköping	86.4	20.2	38,573	31.4	19.7	18.5	6.9	6.5	5.9	5.5	4.3	1.5	19,342	18,662	50.1	48.4	680
Oxelösund	83.5	4.0	7,722	37.0	17.5	20.2	6.9	3.6	5.2	3.8	3.4	2.4	3,964	3,576	51.3	46.3	388
Strängnäs	86.0	13.3	25,386	24.5	23.8	21.2	5.2	6.5	6.0	5.2	5.9	1.8	10,500	14,435	41.4	56.9	3,935
Trosa	88.2	5.2	9,975	24.3	26.0	20.1	4.1	6.9	6.2	5.5	5.6	1.3	4,063	5,780	40.7	57.9	1,717
Vingåker	85.6	3.0	5,814	30.4	18.9	25.9	4.9	4.8	6.2	3.6	3.5	1.8	2,547	3,165	43.8	54.4	618
Total	84.0	100.0	190,962	30.5	19.6	20.2	7.3	5.6	5.7	4.8	4.5	1.7	92,242	95,546	48.3	50.0	3,304
Source: Sweden's Election Authority

=== Uppsala ===
Location	Turnout	Share	Votes	S	M	SD	V	C	KD	MP	L	Other	L-vote	R-vote	Left	Right	Margin
Location	%	%		%	%	%	%	%	%	%	%	%			%	%	
Enköping	85.2	11.7	31,007	25.9	22.0	22.5	6.2	6.1	7.4	3.9	4.4	1.6	13,064	17,449	42.1	56.3	4,385
Heby	84.1	3.4	9,137	25.6	16.9	26.2	5.3	7.5	8.3	3.8	4.0	2.4	3,858	5,064	42.2	55.4	1,206
Håbo	85.1	5.4	14,421	22.2	25.0	25.1	4.8	4.9	7.2	3.5	5.5	1.8	5,103	9,062	35.4	62.8	3,959
Knivsta	88.5	5.1	13,443	22.7	20.8	16.7	6.4	8.8	9.2	7.2	6.4	1.7	6,085	7,134	45.3	53.1	1,049
Tierp	84.7	5.1	13,664	30.6	16.5	23.9	5.8	5.8	7.2	4.3	3.8	2.2	6,347	7,019	46.5	51.4	672
Uppsala	87.7	61.4	163,285	27.6	17.1	10.9	12.3	8.7	5.9	10.9	5.2	1.4	97,074	63,928	59.5	39.2	33,146
Älvkarleby	84.4	2.3	6,220	31.9	16.8	27.2	6.2	3.3	5.9	3.1	3.5	2.1	2,766	3,321	44.5	53.4	555
Östhammar	85.1	5.6	14,815	28.5	19.2	23.5	4.0	6.2	8.8	3.4	4.4	1.9	6,238	8,290	42.1	56.0	2,052
Total	86.9	100.0	265,992	27.1	18.4	15.6	9.7	7.7	6.6	8.3	5.0	1.6	140,535	121,267	52.8	45.6	19,268
Source: Sweden's Election Authority

=== Värmland ===
Location	Turnout	Share	Votes	S	M	SD	V	C	KD	MP	L	Other	L-vote	R-vote	Left	Right	Margin
Location	%	%		%	%	%	%	%	%	%	%	%			%	%	
Arvika	84.5	8.9	16,459	32.0	20.2	19.8	5.6	5.3	6.5	5.5	3.7	1.5	7,952	8,264	48.3	50.2	312
Eda	80.2	2.4	4,370	29.1	18.4	28.1	3.7	4.3	9.7	2.1	3.3	1.4	1,715	2,596	39.2	59.4	881
Filipstad	79.0	3.1	5,758	33.7	15.2	28.6	6.6	3.0	5.2	2.2	3.0	2.5	2,616	2,997	45.4	52.0	381
Forshaga	86.9	4.1	7,485	32.9	16.7	23.6	4.7	5.2	7.7	3.7	3.5	2.0	3,481	3,853	46.5	51.5	372
Grums	82.8	3.1	5,661	33.5	16.8	26.6	4.4	4.3	6.5	2.4	3.3	2.3	2,526	3,007	44.6	53.1	481
Hagfors	81.6	3.7	6,752	37.9	14.2	26.1	4.8	3.7	6.0	2.3	3.3	1.8	3,287	3,346	48.7	49.6	59
Hammarö	90.4	6.1	11,353	31.4	24.5	14.2	3.5	7.5	6.7	4.9	6.0	1.2	5,371	5,843	47.3	51.5	472
Karlstad	86.6	36.6	67,700	31.7	21.8	14.5	7.5	6.6	6.0	5.8	4.8	1.4	34,897	31,863	51.5	47.1	3,034
Kil	87.8	4.4	8,069	28.9	20.5	23.1	4.1	5.9	7.2	3.8	4.4	2.0	3,452	4,457	42.8	55.2	1,005
Kristinehamn	84.9	8.6	15,816	32.5	18.0	20.7	6.7	5.4	6.1	3.9	5.1	1.6	7,666	7,893	48.5	49.9	227
Munkfors	82.2	1.2	2,181	39.3	14.0	22.6	5.7	4.5	5.2	3.2	3.4	2.1	1,151	985	52.8	45.2	166
Storfors	84.5	1.3	2,487	32.7	17.1	26.8	4.2	4.4	6.0	2.2	4.2	2.5	1,081	1,345	43.5	54.1	264
Sunne	85.4	4.7	8,621	24.3	23.5	21.4	4.2	9.6	7.2	3.6	4.7	1.6	3,591	4,894	41.7	56.8	1,303
Säffle	83.8	5.1	9,503	26.0	18.9	25.9	4.6	7.5	8.6	2.8	4.1	1.6	3,889	5,460	40.9	57.5	1,571
Torsby	81.7	3.8	6,945	29.9	20.5	24.3	3.8	5.6	7.6	2.6	3.6	2.1	2,911	3,891	41.9	56.0	980
Årjäng	82.2	3.0	5,621	21.0	17.2	27.6	3.5	5.6	16.7	1.9	5.2	1.2	1,798	3,753	32.0	66.8	1,955
Total	85.2	100.0	184,781	31.1	20.1	19.7	5.8	6.1	6.9	4.4	4.4	1.6	87,384	94,447	47.3	51.1	7,063
Source: Sweden's Election Authority

=== Västerbotten ===
Location	Turnout	Share	Votes	S	M	SD	V	C	KD	MP	L	Other	L-vote	R-vote	Left	Right	Margin
Location	%	%		%	%	%	%	%	%	%	%	%			%	%	
Bjurholm	81.9	0.8	1,459	29.3	18.8	22.3	3.1	8.8	9.4	2.7	3.5	2.1	640	789	43.9	54.1	149
Dorotea	80.9	0.8	1,429	37.4	9.9	23.6	5.7	7.6	7.9	2.4	4.0	1.5	759	648	53.1	45.3	111
Lycksele	82.4	4.2	7,532	36.1	15.5	16.7	6.6	4.7	12.0	3.3	3.7	1.4	3,817	3,606	50.7	47.9	211
Malå	80.6	0.9	1,687	38.2	12.4	22.2	7.8	3.7	6.2	3.4	4.9	1.1	897	772	53.2	45.8	125
Nordmaling	82.6	2.5	4,510	33.0	16.3	17.8	5.8	10.0	7.8	3.9	3.7	1.7	2,376	2,058	52.7	45.6	318
Norsjö	82.0	1.3	2,331	39.0	15.3	15.9	5.8	5.8	10.1	2.2	3.5	2.3	1,233	1,044	52.9	44.8	189
Robertsfors	84.3	2.4	4,314	35.4	15.0	14.0	6.9	11.1	6.6	5.9	2.9	2.1	2,557	1,666	59.3	38.6	891
Skellefteå	85.8	26.8	48,601	41.9	14.5	14.2	7.5	6.5	6.1	5.1	2.9	1.3	29,644	18,311	61.0	37.7	11,333
Sorsele	83.5	0.8	1,472	29.8	14.4	22.6	5.0	7.7	8.2	7.5	2.4	2.5	734	701	49.9	47.6	33
Storuman	79.8	1.9	3,476	30.6	15.4	21.1	5.9	6.6	9.0	6.1	3.2	2.0	1,707	1,698	49.1	48.8	9
Umeå	86.8	49.4	89,431	35.8	16.0	9.2	11.7	7.4	4.4	10.3	3.8	1.4	58,302	29,885	65.2	33.4	28,417
Vilhelmina	83.0	2.2	4,030	32.0	11.4	22.8	6.8	6.5	10.6	5.4	2.4	2.1	2,041	1,905	50.6	47.3	136
Vindeln	83.7	1.9	3,390	30.8	18.5	18.2	5.8	9.1	8.1	4.4	3.4	1.8	1,695	1,633	50.0	48.2	62
Vännäs	84.0	3.2	5,729	32.7	16.1	16.1	8.7	8.3	6.8	5.5	3.7	2.2	3,157	2,446	55.1	42.7	711
Åsele	83.1	0.9	1,664	32.7	13.3	22.2	5.3	8.3	8.7	2.3	4.6	2.6	808	812	48.6	48.8	4
Total	85.5	100.0	181,055	36.9	15.4	12.7	9.3	7.2	5.9	7.5	3.5	1.5	110,367	67,974	61.0	37.5	42,393
Source: Sweden's Election Authority

=== Västernorrland ===
Location	Turnout	Share	Votes	S	M	SD	V	C	KD	MP	L	Other	L-vote	R-vote	Left	Right	Margin
Location	%	%		%	%	%	%	%	%	%	%	%			%	%	
Härnösand	84.7	10.0	15,921	34.8	14.7	17.7	7.4	6.7	5.3	8.4	3.6	1.5	9,115	6,568	57.3	41.4	2,547
Kramfors	82.5	7.0	11,086	34.4	11.6	21.8	7.6	8.3	6.3	4.4	3.2	2.5	6,054	4,755	54.6	42.9	1,299
Sollefteå	83.7	7.3	11,651	30.5	9.5	24.5	7.7	8.7	10.9	3.6	2.2	2.4	5,883	5,490	50.5	47.1	393
Sundsvall	85.3	41.5	65,965	33.7	18.3	18.1	6.7	6.3	6.3	4.9	4.3	1.4	34,056	31,018	51.6	47.0	3,038
Timrå	84.8	7.3	11,619	35.7	15.1	24.4	5.2	4.7	6.8	2.8	3.3	1.9	5,633	5,762	48.5	49.6	129
Ånge	82.0	3.6	5,797	33.2	14.3	26.4	5.2	5.6	8.0	2.4	3.1	1.9	2,687	3,002	46.4	51.8	315
Örnsköldsvik	85.8	23.2	36,946	36.4	17.5	16.5	5.0	8.0	7.9	3.7	3.4	1.7	19,605	16,722	53.1	45.3	2,883
Total	84.8	100.0	158,985	34.4	16.2	19.2	6.3	6.9	7.0	4.6	3.7	1.7	83,033	73,317	52.2	46.1	9,716
Source: Sweden's Election Authority

=== Västmanland ===
Location	Turnout	Share	Votes	S	M	SD	V	C	KD	MP	L	Other	L-vote	R-vote	Left	Right	Margin
Location	%	%		%	%	%	%	%	%	%	%	%			%	%	
Arboga	84.5	5.2	9,173	31.3	18.4	22.4	6.2	5.1	5.8	3.9	4.5	2.5	4,261	4,684	46.5	51.1	423
Fagersta	80.5	4.3	7,633	33.6	16.7	23.2	9.6	3.0	4.9	2.8	4.2	2.1	3,738	3,731	49.0	48.9	7
Hallstahammar	83.1	5.8	10,258	32.4	16.7	25.5	7.5	4.1	4.9	3.0	4.1	1.9	4,812	5,247	46.9	51.2	435
Kungsör	84.5	3.1	5,437	28.0	18.4	25.1	7.5	5.4	5.8	2.9	4.6	2.4	2,382	2,927	43.8	53.8	545
Köping	82.0	9.1	16,039	31.3	16.8	24.9	7.9	4.2	6.3	2.7	4.0	2.0	7,383	8,342	46.0	52.0	959
Norberg	83.7	2.0	3,475	32.9	17.5	22.7	6.6	3.7	5.9	3.7	5.0	1.9	1,631	1,777	46.9	51.1	146
Sala	86.1	8.5	14,989	28.7	18.5	23.4	6.2	7.1	6.5	3.6	4.4	1.7	6,816	7,913	45.5	52.8	1,097
Skinnskatteberg	82.4	1.5	2,731	30.8	13.3	28.9	6.0	3.3	6.0	3.2	5.6	3.0	1,182	1,467	43.3	53.7	285
Surahammar	83.1	3.4	6,055	30.4	16.8	31.0	5.2	2.9	5.5	2.7	3.8	1.6	2,499	3,461	41.3	57.2	962
Västerås	83.6	57.1	100,838	30.2	21.5	17.1	8.6	5.8	5.5	4.2	5.6	1.6	49,156	50,089	48.7	49.7	933
Total	83.5	100.0	176,628	30.5	19.7	20.4	8.0	5.3	5.6	3.7	5.0	1.8	83,860	89,638	47.5	50.7	5,778
Source: Sweden's Election Authority

=== Västra Götaland ===
==== Gothenburg ====
Location	Turnout	Share	Votes	S	M	SD	V	C	KD	MP	L	Other	L-vote	R-vote	Left	Right	Margin
Location	%	%		%	%	%	%	%	%	%	%	%			%	%	
Gothenburg	82.7	100.0	380,417	27.1	18.2	11.8	15.1	6.5	4.9	9.1	5.9	1.4	219,932	155,183	57.8	40.8	64,749
Total	82.7	100.0	380,417	27.1	18.2	11.8	15.1	6.5	4.9	9.1	5.9	1.4	219,932	155,183	57.8	40.8	64,749
Source: Sweden's Election Authority

==== Västra Götaland E ====
Location	Turnout	Share	Votes	S	M	SD	V	C	KD	MP	L	Other	L-vote	R-vote	Left	Right	Margin
Location	%	%		%	%	%	%	%	%	%	%	%			%	%	
Essunga	87.0	2.1	3,674	23.2	22.2	27.3	4.2	6.9	7.3	3.5	4.0	1.6	1,384	2,233	37.7	60.8	849
Falköping	86.1	12.0	21,529	27.9	18.1	21.3	6.8	6.6	8.7	4.4	4.3	1.9	9,836	11,276	45.7	52.4	1,440
Grästorp	87.2	2.2	3,882	22.9	21.3	27.0	2.8	8.1	8.8	3.3	4.5	1.5	1,438	2,387	37.0	61.5	949
Gullspång	83.2	1.8	3,175	29.9	18.2	25.4	5.9	5.8	6.0	3.3	3.1	2.5	1,422	1,675	44.8	52.8	253
Götene	87.5	5.0	8,883	27.6	17.0	21.4	5.9	7.9	9.0	5.1	4.5	1.6	4,129	4,614	46.5	51.9	485
Hjo	88.1	3.6	6,369	26.2	20.5	20.5	4.4	6.4	9.6	5.5	5.0	1.7	2,713	3,545	42.6	55.7	832
Karlsborg	88.7	2.8	4,984	25.4	20.9	23.6	3.9	7.4	8.9	3.1	5.2	1.6	1,981	2,922	39.7	58.6	941
Lidköping	88.1	15.6	27,908	30.5	19.3	19.7	5.6	6.2	7.9	4.4	4.9	1.4	13,059	14,450	46.8	51.8	1,391
Mariestad	86.4	9.2	16,458	30.8	21.6	20.1	5.5	5.7	6.8	4.0	3.8	1.6	7,579	8,621	46.1	52.4	1,042
Skara	84.0	6.7	11,977	27.6	19.9	22.0	7.4	6.5	6.7	4.3	4.0	1.7	5,487	6,292	45.8	52.5	805
Skövde	86.0	21.3	38,201	27.8	21.5	18.6	6.5	6.8	8.0	4.4	4.6	1.8	17,378	20,134	45.5	52.7	2,756
Tibro	84.5	4.1	7,337	28.9	18.2	22.6	5.4	6.1	9.2	2.8	5.0	1.9	3,165	4,034	43.1	55.0	869
Tidaholm	86.9	4.8	8,515	33.0	14.7	24.3	4.2	4.6	9.6	3.4	4.3	1.8	3,858	4,503	45.3	52.9	645
Töreboda	84.1	3.3	5,855	26.4	18.9	25.3	6.8	6.8	7.1	2.7	3.5	2.4	2,502	3,210	42.7	54.8	708
Vara	85.0	5.8	10,295	21.5	24.6	26.8	4.7	6.9	7.3	2.5	4.1	1.7	3,654	6,465	35.5	62.8	2,811
Total	86.3	100.0	179,042	28.1	19.9	21.4	5.8	6.5	8.0	4.1	4.4	1.7	79,585	96,361	44.5	53.8	16,776
Source: Sweden's Election Authority

==== Västra Götaland N ====
Location	Turnout	Share	Votes	S	M	SD	V	C	KD	MP	L	Other	L-vote	R-vote	Left	Right	Margin
Location	%	%		%	%	%	%	%	%	%	%	%			%	%	
Bengtsfors	83.1	3.2	5,635	28.1	15.8	26.3	6.2	6.2	7.2	4.3	3.9	2.1	2,522	2,997	44.8	53.2	475
Dals-Ed	82.7	1.6	2,826	20.5	20.5	28.1	3.0	7.0	11.8	2.1	5.2	2.0	919	1,850	32.5	65.5	931
Färgelanda	85.0	2.3	4,145	22.0	15.5	34.5	3.6	8.1	7.3	2.1	4.6	2.2	1,484	2,565	35.8	61.9	1,081
Lysekil	86.1	5.4	9,522	29.7	18.6	20.8	5.7	5.6	6.0	5.7	6.5	1.4	4,447	4,942	46.7	51.9	495
Mellerud	84.2	3.3	5,783	23.6	20.4	26.6	5.0	7.3	8.1	3.3	3.8	1.9	2,266	3,406	39.2	58.9	1,140
Munkedal	84.1	3.7	6,608	24.9	17.3	28.3	4.4	6.3	8.2	3.9	4.4	2.3	2,606	3,850	39.4	58.3	1,244
Orust	87.7	6.1	10,791	24.4	20.1	21.9	4.2	7.2	7.8	6.5	6.1	1.8	4,558	6,038	42.2	56.0	1,480
Sotenäs	87.7	3.7	6,595	24.0	25.0	20.9	3.4	5.5	8.3	4.2	7.6	1.1	2,445	4,076	37.1	61.8	1,631
Strömstad	80.6	4.3	7,528	26.9	18.8	23.1	6.0	6.4	7.0	4.5	5.4	1.9	3,301	4,087	43.8	54.3	786
Tanum	86.3	4.9	8,693	22.2	22.8	21.1	4.1	8.8	7.8	5.5	6.1	1.5	3,530	5,030	40.6	57.9	1,500
Trollhättan	84.7	21.3	37,657	33.5	19.9	17.2	9.5	4.9	5.6	4.2	3.9	1.3	19,628	17,549	52.1	46.6	2,079
Uddevalla	85.1	20.9	36,885	29.5	18.2	21.0	8.1	5.0	7.0	4.9	5.1	1.3	17,476	18,946	47.4	51.4	1,470
Vänersborg	85.0	14.9	26,248	29.3	18.0	21.4	8.2	5.7	6.9	4.2	4.7	1.5	12,447	13,403	47.4	51.1	956
Åmål	83.0	4.3	7,595	28.8	16.6	24.4	8.3	5.1	6.9	4.1	4.1	1.9	3,509	3,944	46.2	51.9	435
Total	84.9	100.0	176,511	28.6	19.1	21.6	7.1	5.8	6.9	4.5	4.9	1.5	81,138	92,683	46.0	52.5	11,545
Source: Sweden's Election Authority

==== Västra Götaland S ====
Location	Turnout	Share	Votes	S	M	SD	V	C	KD	MP	L	Other	L-vote	R-vote	Left	Right	Margin
Location	%	%		%	%	%	%	%	%	%	%	%			%	%	
Bollebygd	88.6	4.5	6,523	23.7	21.4	25.1	4.0	6.2	7.7	4.9	5.2	1.8	2,535	3,872	38.9	59.4	1,337
Borås	83.2	49.1	71,714	29.3	20.2	18.9	8.9	5.4	6.8	4.5	4.6	1.5	34,473	36,132	48.1	50.4	1,659
Herrljunga	86.9	4.3	6,331	23.1	19.2	23.4	5.0	8.4	10.2	3.9	4.4	2.4	2,557	3,621	40.4	57.2	1,064
Mark	85.6	15.6	22,796	27.4	17.8	22.0	5.7	7.7	8.6	4.2	4.6	2.0	10,276	12,060	45.1	52.9	1,784
Svenljunga	84.0	4.6	6,679	22.2	19.6	27.7	4.4	6.4	8.8	3.1	6.0	1.9	2,410	4,140	36.1	62.0	1,730
Tranemo	84.7	5.2	7,543	27.5	19.3	21.3	6.1	8.7	8.1	3.5	3.8	1.7	3,456	3,958	45.8	52.5	502
Ulricehamn	86.2	11.2	16,325	25.1	20.7	20.9	5.4	8.4	8.4	4.2	4.9	1.8	7,046	8,979	43.2	55.0	1,933
Vårgårda	88.0	5.6	8,170	24.2	16.1	21.6	5.4	9.3	12.0	4.9	4.2	2.2	3,584	4,409	43.9	54.0	825
Total	84.7	100.0	146,081	27.3	19.6	20.7	7.1	6.7	7.9	4.3	4.6	1.8	66,337	77,171	45.4	52.6	10,834
Source: Sweden's Election Authority

==== Västra Götaland W ====
Location	Turnout	Share	Votes	S	M	SD	V	C	KD	MP	L	Other	L-vote	R-vote	Left	Right	Margin
Location	%	%		%	%	%	%	%	%	%	%	%			%	%	
Ale	85.0	7.8	20,090	28.0	19.5	21.5	8.7	5.6	6.2	4.3	4.4	1.8	9,359	10,370	46.6	51.6	1,011
Alingsås	87.8	11.1	28,828	27.0	18.5	16.9	6.9	7.8	8.1	7.2	5.8	1.8	14,095	14,222	48.9	49.3	127
Härryda	89.3	10.1	26,142	23.9	23.6	17.3	4.9	8.7	6.3	6.6	7.3	1.5	11,510	14,251	44.0	54.5	2,741
Kungälv	89.2	13.3	34,362	25.0	22.5	20.4	5.3	6.8	7.0	5.0	6.4	1.5	14,508	19,325	42.2	56.2	4,817
Lerum	89.9	11.1	28,836	23.4	22.9	16.9	5.7	8.0	7.2	7.9	6.9	1.0	13,004	15,539	45.1	53.9	2,535
Lilla Edet	82.4	3.3	8,635	26.0	15.9	30.6	7.1	5.3	6.7	3.1	3.5	1.9	3,581	4,894	41.5	56.7	1,313
Mölndal	87.5	18.2	47,179	26.4	21.6	15.3	7.7	7.9	5.9	7.5	6.4	1.4	23,340	23,174	49.5	49.1	166
Partille	86.0	9.8	25,487	26.8	22.0	14.5	7.9	8.1	6.2	7.2	6.2	1.1	12,748	12,471	50.0	48.9	277
Stenungsund	88.2	7.2	18,678	24.1	23.0	20.8	5.2	6.6	7.6	4.9	6.4	1.4	7,622	10,791	40.8	57.8	3,169
Tjörn	89.3	4.4	11,304	21.8	22.2	20.3	3.6	6.2	10.5	5.2	8.8	1.3	4,159	7,001	36.8	61.9	2,842
Öckerö	90.6	3.6	9,431	21.5	21.3	19.0	3.1	6.4	14.9	5.5	6.8	1.5	3,439	5,848	36.5	62.0	2,409
Total	87.9	100.0	258,972	25.3	21.5	18.2	6.3	7.4	7.2	6.3	6.3	1.4	117,365	137,886	45.3	53.2	20,521
Source: Sweden's Election Authority

=== Örebro ===
Location	Turnout	Share	Votes	S	M	SD	V	C	KD	MP	L	ÖP	Other	L-vote	R-vote	Left	Right	Margin
Location	%	%		%	%	%	%	%	%	%	%	%	%			%	%	
Askersund	86.5	3.9	7,860	28.1	16.5	25.1	4.0	6.1	7.3	3.8	4.0	4.4	0.9	3,292	4,152	41.9	52.8	860
Degerfors	84.6	3.0	6,163	34.5	14.8	23.5	7.3	3.5	5.8	2.6	2.9	4.2	0.9	2,955	2,893	47.9	46.9	62
Hallsberg	85.1	5.0	10,175	32.6	15.7	22.6	5.5	5.3	5.7	3.6	3.5	4.9	0.7	4,784	4,828	47.0	47.4	44
Hällefors	80.9	1.9	3,858	34.6	14.4	22.3	6.6	4.1	5.1	3.4	3.0	5.6	0.9	1,881	1,727	48.8	44.8	154
Karlskoga	84.6	9.9	20,080	32.7	22.0	19.6	6.6	3.6	4.8	3.0	3.4	3.9	0.6	9,192	9,981	45.8	49.7	789
Kumla	86.7	7.2	14,536	29.4	18.4	20.1	6.1	5.4	6.9	3.2	5.3	4.4	0.7	6,424	7,368	44.2	50.7	944
Laxå	85.0	1.7	3,542	29.3	14.4	25.5	5.2	6.1	8.2	3.0	3.2	4.2	1.0	1,542	1,817	43.5	51.3	275
Lekeberg	88.9	2.8	5,639	22.3	19.8	22.5	3.5	8.6	8.6	4.1	4.7	5.0	0.9	2,170	3,135	38.5	55.6	965
Lindesberg	84.4	7.4	15,016	27.8	16.5	24.4	6.0	5.2	6.0	3.9	4.2	4.8	1.1	6,452	7,672	43.0	51.1	1,220
Ljusnarsberg	79.4	1.3	2,704	29.6	16.8	27.7	6.0	3.2	4.7	2.4	3.1	5.1	1.4	1,115	1,412	41.2	52.2	297
Nora	85.2	3.5	7,027	29.7	16.7	21.1	5.6	5.7	5.8	5.7	4.3	4.1	1.1	3,288	3,369	46.8	47.9	81
Örebro	86.6	52.4	106,413	30.5	17.5	13.7	9.6	6.3	6.2	6.1	4.9	4.4	0.7	55,894	45,086	52.5	42.4	10,808
Total	85.9	100.0	203,013	30.3	17.6	17.8	7.8	5.7	6.2	4.9	4.4	4.5	0.8	98,989	93,440	48.8	46.0	5,549
Source: Sweden's Election Authority

=== Östergötland ===
Location	Turnout	Share	Votes	S	M	SD	V	C	KD	MP	L	Other	L-vote	R-vote	Left	Right	Margin
Location	%	%		%	%	%	%	%	%	%	%	%			%	%	
Boxholm	88.0	1.2	3,719	30.3	16.4	24.0	5.5	7.0	6.8	3.5	4.4	2.0	1,723	1,920	46.3	51.6	197
Finspång	84.3	4.4	13,813	32.2	16.4	24.0	6.4	5.0	6.4	3.8	4.2	1.4	6,558	7,059	47.5	51.1	501
Kinda	87.8	2.2	6,739	25.8	19.4	22.1	4.4	8.7	7.9	5.6	4.3	1.8	2,993	3,622	44.4	53.7	629
Linköping	87.2	36.4	113,233	27.8	21.4	13.6	7.9	8.7	6.1	7.5	5.4	1.5	58,787	52,774	51.9	46.6	6,013
Mjölby	86.4	6.0	18,826	28.4	21.9	22.2	5.2	5.6	6.8	3.5	4.9	1.6	8,039	10,494	42.7	55.7	2,455
Motala	84.5	9.1	28,192	31.6	19.4	21.9	5.8	5.3	6.2	3.3	4.7	1.8	12,947	14,740	45.9	52.3	1,793
Norrköping	83.3	29.7	92,295	28.5	20.5	19.6	8.3	5.1	6.5	5.2	4.6	1.7	43,526	47,230	47.2	51.2	3,704
Söderköping	88.3	3.2	10,031	22.6	21.5	24.8	3.5	7.7	8.0	5.0	5.5	1.5	3,888	5,993	38.8	59.7	2,105
Vadstena	88.1	1.7	5,377	26.9	22.4	17.6	5.2	7.2	7.0	7.0	5.2	1.6	2,491	2,802	46.3	52.1	311
Valdemarsvik	84.3	1.6	5,115	26.7	18.3	26.4	4.8	6.9	8.0	2.5	4.8	1.6	2,092	2,940	40.9	57.5	848
Ydre	89.7	0.8	2,562	21.9	18.0	21.7	3.5	12.6	11.2	5.2	4.2	1.8	1,105	1,411	43.1	55.1	306
Åtvidaberg	86.8	2.5	7,790	30.7	19.2	23.4	4.0	6.2	7.3	3.5	4.1	1.6	3,461	4,204	44.4	54.0	743
Ödeshög	86.2	1.1	3,515	23.8	20.3	23.2	3.6	6.0	12.7	4.6	3.7	1.9	1,337	2,110	38.0	60.0	773
Total	85.6	100.0	311,207	28.4	20.6	18.5	7.1	6.8	6.6	5.6	4.9	1.6	148,947	157,299	47.9	50.5	8,352
Source: Sweden's Election Authority
