= Markus Allard =

Swedish politician and journalist

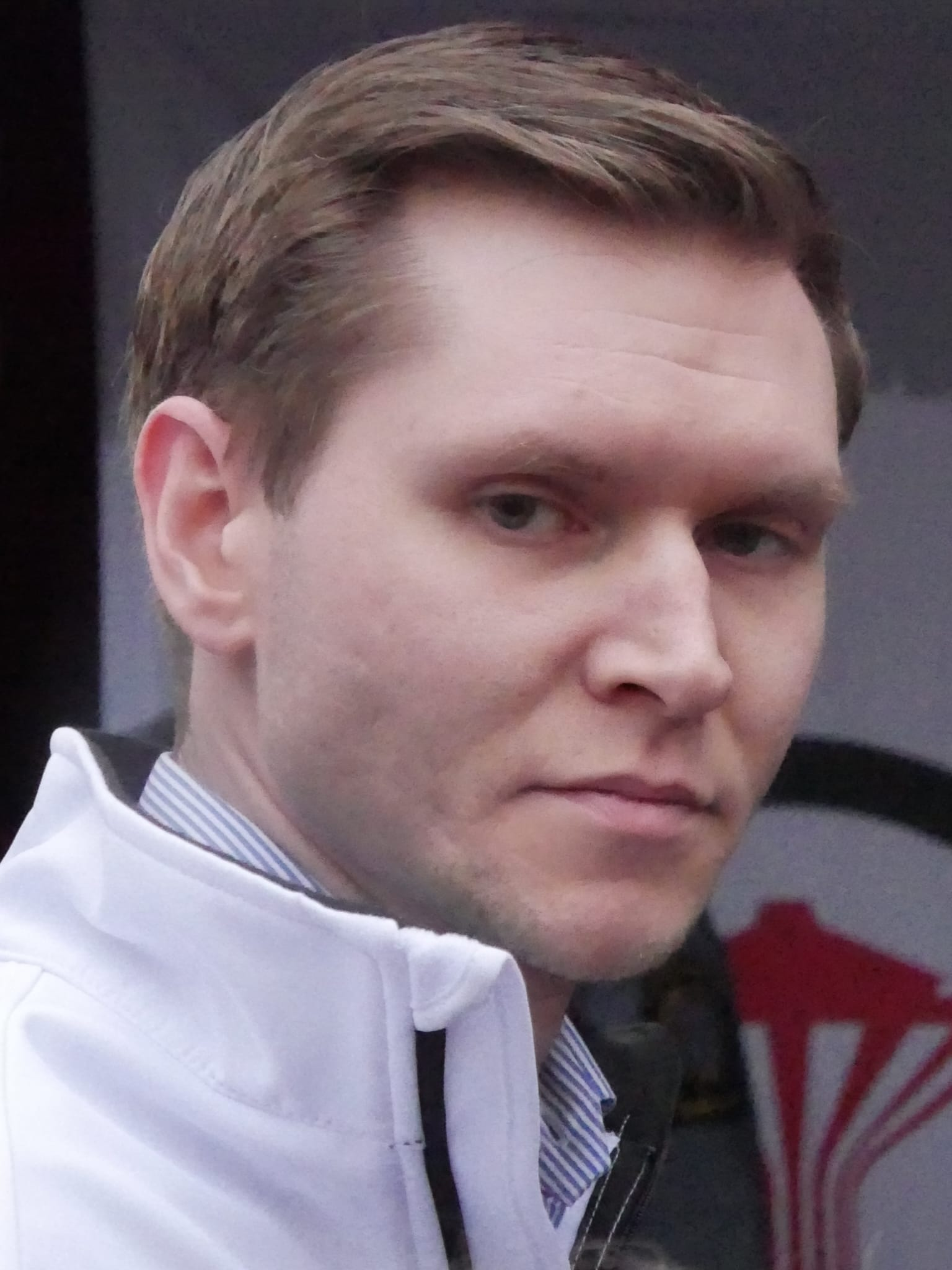
- Allard (2026)

Leader of the Örebro Party
- Incumbent
- Assumed office 5 March 2014
- Preceded by: Position established

Member of the Örebro municipal assembly
- Incumbent
- Assumed office 2018

Personal details
- Born: Karl Markus Alfred Allard; 3 January 1990 (age 36)
- Party: Örebro Party (since 2014)
- Other political affiliations: Sweden: Left (until 2013); Mali: SADI (until 2012)
- Relatives: Henry Allard (grandfather)

Karl Markus Alfred Allard (born 3 January 1990) is a Swedish politician, journalist and columnist, serving as leader of the Örebro Party since its inception in 2014. Since the general election in 2018, he is a municipal commissioner and member in the Örebro municipal assembly. Following the 2022 election, he is also county commissioner and member of the Örebro county council. Allard writes columns for the blog Ledarsidorna, and has previously worked as a journalist for the online newspaper Nyheter Idag as well as the Sweden Democrat-connected media outlet Riks.

He has a podcast with writer Malcom Kyeyune and with former Alternative for Sweden Riksdag candidate Erik Berglund.

Allard and his party have been described as a nationalist, left-wing populist and right-wing populist. He has also been accused of being a communist.

== Biography ==
From 2009 to 2013, Allard was chairman of the Young Left's district organisation in Örebro. He worked for the election campaign of Oumar Mariko in Mali during the 2012 Malian coup d'état.

Markus Allard is the grandson of the Social Democratic politician and speaker of the Riksdag Henry Allard.

== Political positions ==
=== Foreign policy ===
Markus Allard supports Sweden leaving NATO and massively increasing its weapons production and arms exports. Allard is also in favor of Sweden leaving the European Union in a so called "Swexit". Regarding support for Ukraine, Allard has stated his belief that Sweden should only support other countries on the condition that it would benefit Sweden, following a "Sweden first" principle. He has criticized the Swedish foreign aid budget, voicing his support for its abolition, arguing that it costs far too much money. Before Sweden joined NATO, Allard wrote that he "does not understand how [joining NATO] lessens the military threat from Russia", and that he sees Russia as a threat to Sweden regardless of who rules Russia, due to geopolitical reasons.

Allard has voiced support for the idea of a Nordic union.

In a post from 2012, Allard criticized the state of Israel and wrote that "Cuba is going to be placed under an embargo but the fascist apartheid state of Israel is defended until the last Palestinian child has been incinerated. Liberal politics." In 2025, he referenced the Israeli–Palestinian conflict again, writing that he "does not give a shit" about Israel or Palestine, and that he thinks it is wrong to kill children regardless of which side perpetuates it.

=== Remigration ===
Markus Allard has voiced support for large scale remigration on multiple occasions. In a debate with a Liberal member of parliament, he asked why the Liberals "[do not] wish to deport 100,000 social welfare-Somalis?" In the same debate, Allard also claimed that "Sweden belongs to the Swedes. We have to make sure that we take care of our own damn people and we must deport these damn parasites who sit and live at our expense." Regarding deporting those born in Sweden, Allard said in a podcast that "They will also be forced to leave, even if they are born in Sweden, because they have no natural connection to Sweden. They are not Swedish."

=== Use of public expenditure ===
An opponent of spending tax payer money on art and monuments, Allard has frequently criticized various projects in Örebro as a "waste of tax payer money", including the construction of a chrome apple in the Örebro neighborhood of Vivalla that was built at a cost of 660,000 SEK. Allard has also been a vocal critic of what he refers to as "made up occupations", which are occupations with high salaries, most often in the public sector, that he sees as unnecessary services and a waste of tax payer money.

=== Welfare ===
Allard has stated that he wants to reduce the salaries of politicians, and instead allocate that money towards the subsidization of dental care. In 2026, Allard voted in favor of a proposal in the municipal assembly which would, for a two-year trial period, reduce the work week to 30 hours for some welfare occupations, such as preschool teachers and employees at care facilities.

=== Other ===
Allard has criticized Swedish alcohol policies, stating that he wants to allow the sale of alcohol in stores without abolishing the Swedish alcohol monopoly. He has expressed his belief that the Swedish alcohol monopoly chain Systembolaget should extend their shopping hours to be open during Saturday afternoons and on Sundays, and that they should be allowed to sell cooled beer.
