= List of left-conservative political parties =

List of left-conservative political parties may refer to:

- List of economic left and socially conservative political parties
- List of moderate conservative political parties and caucuses
- List of liberal conservative political parties and caucuses
