= Malcom Kyeyune =

Swedish writer and blogger (born 1987)

Malcom Kyeyune (born 19 December 1987) is a Swedish writer and blogger. He has written for publications such as Aftonbladet, Fokus, Göteborgs-Posten, Dagens Samhälle, Kvartal, UnHerd, The Bellows, American Affairs, and Compact Magazine He has a podcast together with Markus Allard of the municipal Örebro Party. Between 2020 and 2022 he was part of the steering council for the conservative think tank Oikos headed by the politician Mattias Karlsson. Kyeyune was a member of the Swedish Young Left and chairman of its Uppsala district until 2014, when he was suspended alongside six other members due to their expression of support for the Revolutionary Front and Anti-Fascist Action.

While sometimes being labeled by media as a conservative due to his previous participation in Oikos, Kyeyune primarily describes himself as a Marxist. He has argued for populism as a political doctrine, which he defines as the notion that "a country where the will of the people steers the agenda will be a country which is just and well-functioning" and that one must "believe in regular people, in workers", even if such a position implies that he, a Marxist, joins ranks with "people such as Jimmie Åkesson or Paula Bieler".

== See also ==
- John Michael Greer
