= Bålstapartiet =

Swedish political party

The Bålsta Party (Swedish: Bålstapartiet, BÅP) is a Swedish local political party founded in 1994 and represented in the Håbo municipal council since 1998. It is run by former June list and Social-democratic politician Owe Fröjd. The party's policies includes municipal security guards, easier planning permissions and more frequent departures for regional transit. It participates in a coalition with other municipal parties to contest the Uppsala county regional elections, called Local parties of Uppsala County.

== Election results ==
Year	Votes	Percent	Seats
1998	?	7,3%	3 (of 41)
2002	809	8,12%	3 (of 41)
2006	1 611	14,79%	6 (of 41)
2010	882	7,4%	3 (of 41)
2014	582	4,6%	2 (of 41)
2018	965	7,14%	3 (of 41)
