= Renew Enköping =

Renew Enköping (Swedish: Nystart Enköping, NE) is a local political party in Enköping municipality, located in Uppsala county, Sweden. It was founded in 2014 and received 14% of the votes in the subsequent municipal election. It governed in coalition with the Social democrats between 2014 and 2018.

It received 9.25% in the 2018 municipal election.

It is part of the Local parties of Uppsala County regional coalition.
