= Örebro Party =

Political party in Sweden

Örebro Party Örebropartiet
- Abbreviation: ÖP; ÖrP
- Leader: Markus Allard
- Founder: Markus Allard
- Founded: 5 March 2014; 12 years ago
- Split from: Left Party
- Headquarters: Örebro
- Ideology: Populism; Swedish nationalism Left-conservatism; Anti-establishment; Anti-corruption; Anti-immigration
- Political position: Syncretic
- Colours: Red; Black; White
- Riksdag: 0 / 349
- County council: 11 / 71
- Municipal council: 11 / 65

Website
- orebropartiet.se

The Örebro Party (Swedish: Örebropartiet, ÖP or ÖrP) is a political party in Sweden. The party was initially active only in Örebro, but has since sought to become a national party by entering the Riksdag. Markus Allard is the party leader. According to Allard, the party cannot be placed anywhere on the traditional left–right political spectrum. The party has variously been characterized as left-wing, right-wing, populist, nationalist, and conservative.

Some key issues for the Örebro Party locally include strong secularism, a 30-hour workweek with retained pay, lowered wages for politicians, expanded social housing, abolishing preschool fees, making public transport free of charge, ending taxpayer funding of what it sees as wasteful sculptures, monuments and art and introducing free dental care. Nationally the party has set out, what they call "remigration" on a large scale, closing the Swedish borders to immigration, a stricter assimilation policy and ending taxes on energy and fuel as some of its key issues. The party runs candidates for seats in the municipal assembly of Örebro Municipality and the Örebro County Council. Since the 2022 elections, it has held five seats in the municipal assembly and three in the regional assembly. Its symbol represents Svampen (The Mushroom), a water tower that is a prominent landmark in Örebro.

In October 2025, party leader Markus Allard announced the party's intention to contest the 2026 Swedish general election. Allard said the decision was motivated by the party's financial position, which now allowed it to field candidates in the election to the Riksdag. He set a goal of winning a seat in parliament through the Örebro Riksdag constituency, where the electoral threshold is 12%.

In the 2026 Swedish general election the Örebro Party received just below 40 000 votes, winning 0.59% of the nationwide vote in the Riksdag election. In the Örebro County Constituency the party received 4.67% of the vote, surpassing the Liberals. As the party did not reach 4% nationwide or 12% in any constituency it did not gain any seats in the Riksdag. In the Regional election in Örebro County the party ended up in third place, increasing its vote share by 11 points to 15.5% of the vote. In the municipal election in Örebro Municipality the party increased by more than 9 points to 17.1% of the vote, finishing in second place overall.

== History ==
=== Split from the left ===
The initiative to found the Örebro Party was taken in early 2014 by Markus Allard, who also became the first party leader. Allard had previously held positions as substitute member of the Örebro municipal council and district chairman of the Young Left in Örebro; in December 2013 he was expelled from the Left Party and its youth wing Young Left for "liking" the Revolutionary Front, a militant revolutionary socialist and anti-fascist organization, on Facebook and refusing to disavow it when questioned. Allard has stated that the real reason for his expulsion was that he was perceived as a threat to the established party bureaucracy.

While Allard has described himself as a Communist, and a Marxist, at its founding in March 2014 he defined the Örebro Party as "broad left". At that time the party considered itself a "local party that wants to carry on the labour movement's ideals", and "not interested in administrating the current society".

As a result of signing the petition required for ÖP to be registered as a party, a large number of Left Party members in Örebro were informed of the party's intention to expel them. This triggered backlash from several other Left Party members in social media, and a number of Left Party and Young Left members who had signed the petition later appeared on the party's list of election candidates while not joining ÖP as members. Throughout early 2014, several members of the Young Left were expelled for expressing support for Allard and his position on the Revolutionary Front, among them the writer Malcom Kyeyune and Axel Frick, Allard's replacement as district chairman of the Young Left in Örebro and an Örebro Party candidate.

In the September 2014 Swedish election, the party received 1,050 votes in the municipal council election in Örebro, and also some write-in votes in Örebro County for the Riksdag.

=== Entering the municipal assembly ===
In February 2018, Allard stated that having decided to focus on "down-to-earth and local issues", the party membership had broadened since its foundation and he would no longer characterize it as either left or right. The same month Peter Springare, an Örebro police officer, joined the party. He had attracted attention the previous year for a Facebook post about his experience with the overrepresentation of violent crime among immigrants.

In the 2018 election, the party gained two seats on the Örebro municipal council, where it is represented by Allard and Springare. They subsequently gained representation on the Örebro municipal executive committee, with Allard as full-time municipal commissioner. Since achieving municipal representation in 2018 the party has gotten considerable attention for Allard's distinctly polemical debating style in the municipal chamber, with a number of speeches going viral.

=== Becoming a national party ===
In October 2025 ÖP-leader Markus Allard announced that the Örebro Party had sufficient funds to become a nationwide party and participate in the 2026 Swedish general election. The Örebro Party and Allard set out the goal for the party to enter parliament via the 12% constituency threshold, which gives a political party one seat if that party manages to clear at least 12% in a constituency, even if that party does not reach the 4% parliamentary threshold nationwide. If successful this would be the first time in Swedish political history in which a party enters parliament that way as previous attempts by the Norrbotten Party in 2002 and the Christian Democrats in 1988 were unsuccessful. A secondary goal set out by the party was to garner 1% of the vote nationwide as that would result in the party getting their ballots distributed nationwide in the following election in 2030.

A December 2025 poll conducted by Verian for SVT showed the Örebro Party being the largest political party outside of parliament. Polls from Nordisk Opinion have shown the Örebro Party polling at 0.4 and 0.9% and in hypothetical polls where respondents were asked how they would vote if Sweden did not have a parliamentary threshold at 4% the Örebro Party received between 1.9 and 2.8%. A local poll in May 2026 showed the Örebro Party receiving 18.4% of the vote in the municipal election in Örebro and thus becoming the second largest party in the municipal council, up from 7.9% in the 2022 election. Among men aged 18–39 ÖP would receive 30.3% of the vote and become the largest party.

In June 2026 the newspaper Flamman revealed that the CEO of the Swedish tech-company Mullvad, Daniel Berntsson, had donated 5,000,000 SEK to the Örebro Party in 2025. Berntsson argued that he felt it was necessary to make a donation as the Örebro Party "fights against corruption and dysfunction" and wrote that the donation was made "Because of their spine, their will on focusing on that which is important, their clear-sightedness in the political game as well as to compensate for how they are being worked against in dishonest and illegal ways by the media and other parties."

=== 2026 run up to the elections to the Riksdag and regional & municipal assemblies ===
In May 2026 the Örebro Party got an additional municipal councilor as Glenn Roswall became a full-time politician.

The ruling Social Democrats, the largest party in the Örebro municipal council, named the Örebro Party as their main opponent ahead of the 2026 municipal election in Örebro and challenged ÖP-leader Markus Allard to a one on one debate between S and ÖP before the election. Markus Allard accepted a debate but questioned why the Social Democrats and their local leader had not been open to a debate before. Allard also claimed that the Örebro Party was the only alternative to a Social Democrat-led coalition.

In the election compass made by SVT for the 2026 election the Örebro Party, just as the other parties, were given the chance to give their view of different political topics.
The Örebro Party responded to the statement:
•"My municipality should encourage remigration for immigrants who are not integrated" with "Completely agree" (Note: "OH YES!!! SWEDEN BELONGS TO THE SWEDES! If an immigrant refuses to adapt then they should not be here. In our national party program we will present measures for massive remigration. We need to start by getting rid of the criminals and people who have lived off of social welfare year after year. 0 arguments to keep them here. On a municipal level that which can be done, should be done to achieve remigration/deportation of these.")
The Örebro Party responded to the statement:
•"The municipality should put more effort into preserving the cultures and traditions of minorities" with "Completely disagree" (Note: "Absolutely NOT!!! The opposite! We should have remigration and assimilation for those who remain in the country. Sweden belongs to the Swedes. And if anything Sweden should preserved as Swedish. If you can’t accept that then you should actually not live in Sweden.")
Regarding municipal taxes, the Örebro Party responded to the statement:
•"How much should the inhabitants of my municipality pay in municipal taxes?" with "A lot less" (Note: "We are the only party that proposes a substantial decrease in the municipal tax with 1 kr. SD wants to lower by one penny, one hundredth of our tax-decrease. Other parties have voted no to our tax-decrease. If another partiy answers: "A LOT LESS” then they are LYING straight in your face. Only the Örebro Party proposes a substantial tax-decrease").

A poll from Sentio Research in June 2026 showed the Örebro Party being less than a point away from emerging as the largest party in the municipal elections in Örebro. The poll showed nearly all other parties decreasing from the last election whilst showing a massive increase for the Örebro party, which would increase from 7.9% in 2022 to 28.3% in 2026. According to Markus Allard other recent polls had shown the Örebro Party polling at 20-24% for the municipal elections in Örebro municipality and at around 20% for the 2026 regional elections in Region Örebro County, compared to 4.5% in the regional elections in 2022.

In the summer prior to the 2026 election former member of parliament for the Sweden Democrats and later Alternative for Sweden, Jeff Ahl endorsed the Örebro Party. The nationalist influencer The Golden One stated in a post on X in 2026 that he wishes to see Allard and the Örebro Party elected to parliament. Dan Eriksson and Magnus Söderman from the Swedish nationalist organisation Det Fria Sverige have on multiple occasions discussed the Örebro Party and commended party leader Markus Allard.

=== 2026 General Election ===
In August 2026, Swedish Minister for Finance Elisabeth Svantesson referred to Örebro Party leader Markus Allard as "a Trumpist of the worse kind". Allard responded by saying "I call a spade a spade and an idiot an idiot" and called the rightwing government "fucking losers".

In a podcast in August 2026 Jimmie Åkesson, the leader of the Sweden Democrats, criticized the Örebro Party and Markus Allard. Åkesson stated that he would rather work alongside the Liberals than to work with the Örebro Party.

Ahead of the 2026 Swedish General election, multiple large newspapers such as Dagens Nyheter and Svenska Dagbladet, published articles about the Örebro Party and their leader Markus Allard, highlighting the Örebro Party's chances of entering the Swedish parliament via the Örebro county constituency which has a threshold at 12%. Svenska Dagbladet referred to Allard and the Örebro Party as the "Tidö parties biggest headache" whilst Dagens Nyheter called the party "more nationalist than SD".

A Novus poll in August 2026 showed the Örebro Party emerging as the second largest party in Region Örebro County, reaching 15.1% of the vote share, up more than 10 points since the 2022 Regional election where the party won 4.5% of the vote.

Following the 2026 Region Örebro County election the Sweden Democrats invited the Örebro Party, the Moderate Party, the Christian Democrats and the Liberals to talks of forming a new coalition in the Region in order to oust the Social Democrats from power.

== Ideology ==
The Örebro Party has been widely described as populist and it has been argued that their position goes beyond the left-right political spectrum. The party has also been described as belonging to the conservative left, as well as "left-populist and right-populist at the same time". The chief editor at Nerikes Allehanda, a local newspaper made accusations against the Örebro Party in connection to a public dispute with the party leader saying it was his personal opinion that they are "racists, fascists and nazis". The party has also been described as a leftwing alternative to the Sweden Democrats and one critic describe them as leftwingers turning far-right.

The Örebro Party has described themselves as "class-conscious populists" and has claimed the party cannot be placed on a left-right spectrum. The party program states: “Corruption and wasteful spending of taxpayers’ money are in many cases direct expressions of class interests, of a particular type of class stratum.” [translated from Swedish]

=== Populism ===
The Örebro party has been described as both right-wing populist and left-wing populist as well as left-conservative. Other sources describe the party as representing authoritarian left-wing populism. A political editor at Trelleborgs Allehanda wrote that no one needs to doubt that the Örebro Party is a left-wing movement, describing the Örebro Party as working class left-wing populist. The liberal think tank Timbro described the core of the Örebro Party and Allard's ideology as an updated form of Marxist class analysis - but that the ideology differed from classical Marxism as the line of conflict for the Örebro Party does not go between workers and capitalists but rather between those who are productive and those who "undeservedly" live off of taxpayer-financed transfers. In the same article the Örebro Party is said to be "both right-wing populist and left-wing populist at the same time".

In an interview with Dagens Nyheter the party leader Allard defends insulting other politicians saying "We also get insulted, you just don't see us crying about it." He elaborates with "Their priority is keeping their cozy political climate. [...] We don't want to be a part of that, we don't give a shit about them." In an interview with Sveriges Television Allard elaborated on the same point saying “The language you use in your damn insular SVT corridors in Stockholm is different from the way people talk in the break rooms of construction site trailers. Of course there’s a difference. You’re part of the establishment. You’re a minority, and ordinary people speak differently.”

=== Democracy ===
The party leader Allard has argued that the Örebro Party is attempting to preserve democracy which is threatened by an overly comfortable political climate and the party has since its founding claimed to fight ongoing undermining of democracy. The Örebro Party has suggested that the transfer of decision-making power to civil servants is undemocratic and way for politicians to escape responsibility. As an alternative they have suggested "cadre politicians".

From the party program: "Cadres are the ideal type of politician. They see the bigger picture, strive for results, and regard laws and regulations as tools—made of rubber, so to speak—rather than as immovable obstacles standing in the way of achieving what needs to be done. [...] The party will, at all times and under all circumstances, discipline civil servants who obstruct the popular will that we have been entrusted to serve. Here, the axe will fall."

The party also supports increased direct democracy as well as maximal political transparency. The party has also argued for extended freedom of speech stating that "people should be allowed to hate politicians".

=== Nationalism ===
Expo has described the Örebro Party as part of a growing left-wing nationalistic movement in Sweden. One journalist from Expo has also described the party as far-right ethnic nationalist in an interview with Flamman. The party has also been described as radical nationalist. The leader of the Örebro Party, Markus Allard stated in 2025 and 2026 that he believes that "Sweden belongs to the Swedes." In a post on X in July 2026 Allard wrote that he does not want ethnic Swedes to become a minority in Sweden. The party has also stated that they want to create an awareness regarding how political decisions effect demographics.

=== Transferiat ===
The party claims to stand for a "class-conscious populism" which according to party leader Markus Allard takes inspiration from Marxist ideology and unites the "productive" classes of society against the "Transferiat", with the "Transferiat" being a term coined by Allard to describe the classes of society that lives off transfers that are a net negative for society such as those who, despite having an ability to work, live off social welfare benefits, as well as those who work in "made-up services" that the party deems to serve no societal function, such as bureaucrats, consultants, public sector communications specialists, strategists and HR-specialists. The party and its leader Markus Allard strongly criticise the "Transferiat" and argues it needs to be abolished as it "sucks money out of the state". The party differs from modern day left-wing parties by seeing the working class as sharing certain interests with the business class in opposition to the classes that "live off transfers", which it sees as a large economic net-negative and an obstacle for a functional society. The party states that there however without a doubt still is a conflict between workers and the capital.

== Policies ==
=== Climate policy ===
The party does not dispute the existence of man-made climate change, but sees Sweden's current climate policy as a waste of taxpayer money. The Örebro Party strongly opposes state financing of green energy as well as green industry projects such as Northvolt, Hybrit, H2 Green steel and Stegra. The party refers to the Swedish handling of climate change as "semi-religious climate anxiety" and "fanatical insanity". The party opposes the green transition, referring to it as a "sham" and argues that the money spent on these projects would be more useful invested in nuclear energy, military, schools and hospitals.

=== Crime policy ===
In its 2026 political program the Örebro Party lists a long range of measures to combat and prevent crime in Sweden. Among measures listed to prevent crime are: closing the border to immigration, and remigration of "misfitted immigrants". The party claims the root cause of nearly all violent crime in Sweden can be traced to Swedish immigration policy. The Örebro Party wants to end the "Sluta skjut" (Stop shooting) method as the party sees the method as a failure.

Among measures listed to combat crime are: automatic deportation of criminal immigrants, enforcing the border, encouraging the establishment of neighborhood watches, criminalizing participation in gangs, registering and red-flagging criminals, "full maneuverability of the crime-fighting authority", abolishing quantity-discounts for sentences, establishing a separate crime-fighting authority specializing in fighting organized crime, establishing a special court for organized crime, establishing a dedicated crime investigation authority where police and prosecutors work side by side and use all state intelligence to detect and mark criminals.

As a punitive measure the Örebro Party wants to allow for the creation of labor camps in Sweden and for penal labor to be a type of punishment for crime. The party writes that those who refuse work should not be let out of prison. Reasons given for implementing this measure is to make the Swedish prison system an economic net positive instead of an economic drainage and that "these are individuals who are in debt to society, not society that is in debt to them". The Örebro Party writes that these prisoners can replace migrant workers in their tasks, arguing that most labor migration to Sweden is "unnecessary".

The Örebro Party wants to change the Swedish way of dealing with drug users from punitive measures to rehabilitation and care. The party writes that "We are against today’s system that sentences drug addicts to prison, as if their actions were to be comparable to violence, theft or crimes against other people". Instead the party wishes to see drug addicts sent to specialized care facilities where the aim is that these people are treated, come off their addiction, and are re-socialized into society. The Örebro Party writes that, while they might not necessarily agree that cannabis should be legalized, the police should not prioritize catching those who use it.

The party says it wants to "de-academize" the police, remove gender quotas and introduce stricter requirements for joining the police force. The party also wants the entire upper police leadership in Sweden to be removed from office and claim that "they are the reason why the Swedish police have become the way it is today".

The Örebro Party is against Chat control.

The Örebro Party is in favor of chemically castrating pedophiles and wants to establish a national pedophile register. The party is in favor of placing ankle monitors on all pedophiles and wants the sentence for sexual crimes against children to be life in prison.

The Örebro Party wants to abolish the Swedish hate crime law "Hets mot folkgrupp" arguing that "it is a law introduced to hinder Swedes from freely discussing the problems that have come with mass immigration." On the other hand, the party wants hate crimes against ethnic Swedes to be an offense in the Swedish criminal code.

=== Cultural policy ===
The Örebro Party wants to cut spending on the purchases of art and monuments and instead want to prioritize spending on the schools of music & arts and on libraries. The party also wants to introduce an allowance for children up to the age of 15 that they can use for cultural activities such as sports or chess.

=== Democracy policy ===
The Örebro Party is in favor of implementing more direct democracy and local decision making and favor decision making on a grassroots level. On a national level the Örebro Party wants Sweden to hold a referendum on the Swedish membership of the European Union and NATO.

=== Elderly care policy ===
The Örebro Party wants the state to take over the responsibility of elderly care from the municipalities. The Örebro party is in favor of allowing the elderly to freely choose their carers. On a local level the Örebro Party proposes enabling a 30-hour workweek in certain care facilities at a small scale. If successful, the party is willing to introduce a 6-hour work day at a larger scale. The party is against the continued closure of elderly care facilities and wants to reopen closed facilities.

After revelations of torture and sexual assault in Swedish elderly care facilities, perpetrated by people employed at the facilities, the Örebro Party demands that politicians and managers are held accountable if there are signs of misconduct in the hiring of employees.

The Örebro Party is in favor of introducing language and competency requirements in elderly care. The party writes in their party program that "We have to stop playing integration-roulette with those who built our country!". The party proposes a reduction of the fee on food and wants to allow pets at certain facilities. The party also proposes the reintroduction of demand-responsive transport.

=== Energy & fuel policy ===
In its 2026 party program the Örebro Party writes that they wish to see a complete elimination of taxes on energy & fuel, which they claim would lead to the prices being significantly reduced. The party proposes the creation of a "Sweden-price" aiming to have the same price on electricity in all of Sweden.

The Örebro Party proposes a nationalization of the Swedish electrical grid. The party also wants to merge Vattenfall and other government agencies that work with electricity and energy into one government agency.

The Örebro Party is against the construction of wind turbines and says they want to introduce a local veto that will make it nearly impossible to get approval for the construction of new wind turbines.

Regarding nuclear power the party is strongly in favor of building new nuclear reactors at a large scale.

The Örebro Party is also in favor of expanding hydropower in Sweden while implementing measures to protect eels, fish and other vulnerable species that are put at risk when building hydroelectric dams.

In case of a national emergency or an international oil crisis the Örebro Party aim to massively expand the Swedish fuel storage facilities for both military and civilian purposes. The party claims that creating a stockpile of fuel would be beneficial as it could be rolled out on the market to lower fuel prices at times where the price on fuel is rising.

=== Foreign policy ===
In a podcast in May 2026 Allard clarified some positions that his party holds and among other things made clear that leaving the EU and NATO were on the table for ÖP. Regarding NATO, Allard claimed that Sweden cannot trust or rely on NATO and that the country should instead seek to massively increase its weapons production and also become a major arms exporter, arguing it would benefit the Swedish economy.

The Örebro Party stated in their party program, released in August 2026, that they want Sweden to leave the European Union, writing: "We need to leave the EU for very obvious reasons."

=== Immigration and remigration policy ===
The party advocates for remigration policies, strong secularism, and assimilationist policies such as immediate closure of Islamic charter schools.

Markus Allard caused significant public debate in 2025 by claiming that Sweden is "the land for/belongs to the Swedes" and that the Örebro Party favors a large scale remigration policy. He also criticised the Sweden Democrats for, according to him, allowing too many immigrants into the country under their watch as confidence and supply to the Kristersson cabinet.

In 2026 Allard sparked controversy on several occasions. In a debate hosted by Studio3 with Liberal member of parliament Martin Melin, Allard asked: "why won't the Liberals push for deporting 100,000 social welfare Somalis?" and in the same debate said that "Sweden belongs to the Swedes. We have to make sure that we take care of our own damn people and we must deport these damn parasites who sit and live at our expense." In a podcast segment about second generation immigrants involved in organised crime Allard stated "They will also be forced to leave, even if they are born in Sweden, because they have no natural connection to Sweden. They are not Swedish. They have not been intrested in becoming Swedish." [Translated from Swedish]

In its political program for the 2026 Swedish general election the Örebro Party writes that they want to "stop the ongoing population replacement" and make Sweden a monocultural society, rather than a multicultural one. The party also writes that this "will be a Sweden where ethnic Swedes are once again the clear majority." The party also claims that "Sweden belongs to the Swedes" and "No other people shall ever be able to lay claims on Sweden. This is our land.” and states that they want to implement measures to decrease the immigrant population in Sweden through remigration, closed borders and a strict assimilation policy.

=== Labor market policy ===
On the topic of lowering work hours the Örebro Party, in 2026 in the municipal assembly, voted in favor of a proposal by the Left Party to enable a 30-hour work week with retained salary for some welfare occupations such as preschool teachers and employees at care facilities as a trial project that would after two years be evaluated.

=== Public spending policy ===
During the 2018–2022 term, the party has opposed prestige public projects it considered wasteful, such as the proposed Palace of Culture and bus rapid transit.

Markus Allard wants to end the funding of, and abolish, the Swedish national broadcaster SVT. Allard motivated the call to abolish the public broadcaster as well as the rest of public service by arguing that the yearly cost of funding it would be the same as making dental care free of charge in the country, which the Örebro Party wants.

The Örebro Party also wants to abolish the County administrative boards of Sweden.

The Örebro Party has since its founding advocated for reducing the salaries of politicians, and in 2026 stated that they wanted to reduce their salaries to 60-75% of today's levels as well as remove severance pay for politicians. In keeping with this policy, Allard promised to donate half of his monthly allowance to fund a planned series of social programmes. In August 2019 the party announced the first such project to be social pole-walking (sauvakävely) for pensioners. During the COVID-19 pandemic the party has used this fund to provide face masks to municipal elderly care workers, while heavily criticising what is perceived as a political gag-order on care workers regarding poor equipment and conditions.

The Örebro Party is against municipalities replacing their fuel-driven cars with electric cars unless it is economically defendable.

=== School policy ===
The Örebro Party advocates for schools in rural areas to be maintained even if the amount of students decrease, and say that they are the only party to have voted to do so. The party argues that the financing of rural schools is more important than spending money on things such as art, monuments and bus rapid transit.

The party is in favor of serving red meat in schools daily and responded to the SVT election compass statement "School lunch should always offer red meat" with "Pupils and children should always feel satisfied in our schools. The idiots can keep the climate anxiety experiment to themselves."

=== Social policy ===
The Örebro Party support making plebiscites easier to enact and more powerful, increased social housing, subsidies for youth recreation, and free dental care. It opposes continued privatisation of health care, elderly care, public housing and municipal education, among other things. The Örebro Party has also proposed making preschools free of charge.

=== Transport policy ===
Markus Allard stated in a post on the platform X in 2025 that the Örebro Party wants to make public transport free of charge in the Region Örebro County and also make parking in the municipality of Örebro free of charge. In 2014 the newspaper ETC reported that Allard had been a long time supporter of making public transport free of charge.

The party has been a leading voice in the opposition to the Bus Rapid Transit project in Örebro and tried to force through a referendum on the issue. After collecting the necessary amount signatures a large portion of them were declared invalid by the county.

== Activities ==
=== Related local parties ===
The Örebro Party actively supports the creation of similar parties in other municipalities such as the Tierp List, Arvikapartiet, Mölndalslistan, and Östgötapartiet–variously described as external branches of the Örebro Party.

=== 2021 bus rapid transit petition ===
During 2021, the Örebro Party participated in a petition campaign demanding a public plebiscite on the planned introduction of bus rapid transit alongside the Liberal Party, the Sweden Democrats and local groups. In October of that year the group turned in 15,500 signatures to the municipality, well over the statutory limit required to call a plebiscite according to Swedish law. The municipality would subsequently disqualify around a third of the signatures, resulting in no vote being held. The municipality's assessment process has been heavily criticised by the Örebro Party for being co-led by an elected Social Democratic politician, repeated inconsistencies in the several rounds of recounting as well as systematic irregularities in the transcription of personal identity numbers allegedly found by the Örebro Party in their own audit. This criticism has in Swedish national media led to comparisons between the Örebro Party, and current US president Donald Trump; as well as accusations of Marxism–Leninism by the local leader of the centre-right Moderate Party. The decision to disqualify the signatures is the subject of ongoing appeal by all parties involved.

=== Local budget proposals ===
In 2025 ÖP-leader Markus Allard wrote on the social media platform X that the Örebro Party, in their budget, had proposed lowering the municipal taxes by nearly 5%. Other budgetary priorities for the party were implementing free of charge parking spaces in all of Örebro Municipality, making dental care free of charge in Region Örebro County as well as implementing free public transport, among other things.

=== Dispute with local newspaper ===
In December 2025 Markus Allard was accused of "manipulating" a survey that he and other politicians in the city council had been sent by local newspaper Nerikes Allehanda (NA). Allard said that he had responded multiple times to the survey as the responses were anonymous and that he had pretended to be other politicians criticising Allard and the use of his language in the city council. The chief editor of NA had also said that the Örebro Party were "racists, fascists, nazis."

=== Suspension of regional council meeting ===
In February 2026 Allard was mentioned in the SVT humor talkshow Svenska Nyheter after Allard had cussed at a Moderate member of the regional council and said that "you are an idiot through and through" after this member had made accusations regarding the standpoints of the Örebro Party and claimed that ÖP wanted to lower the salary of healthcare employees. The strong wording of Allard led to a suspension of the meeting of the regional council.

== Election results ==
=== Riksdag ===
Election	Leader	Votes	%	Seats	+/-	Status
2026	Markus Allard	39,644	0.59 (#9)	0 / 349		No seats

=== Örebro Municipality election results ===
Election	Leader	Votes	%	Seats	+/-	Status
2014	Markus Allard	1,050	1.14 (#10)	0 / 65		Opposition
2018	Markus Allard	2,982	3.01 (#9)	2 / 65	▲2	Opposition
2022	Markus Allard	7,780	7.92 (#5)	5 / 65	▲3	Opposition
2026	Markus Allard	18,318	17.04 (#2)	11 / 65	▲6	Opposition

=== Region Örebro County election results ===
Election	Leader	Votes	%	Seats	+/-	Status
2014	Markus Allard	846	0.45 (#10)	0 / 71		Opposition
2018	Markus Allard	2,461	1.26 (#9)	0 / 71		Opposition
2022	Markus Allard	8,593	4.46 (#8)	3 / 71	▲3	Opposition
2026	Markus Allard	31,461	15.46 (#3)	11 / 71	▲8	Opposition

== See also ==
- Politics of Sweden
- List of political parties in Sweden
- List of active nationalist parties in Europe
- List of economic left and socially conservative political parties
