= Knivsta.nu =

Local political party in Knivsta, Sweden

Knivsta.Nu (KNU) is a local party in Knivsta municipality, Sweden. It was founded in 2002 and is currently third largest party in the municipal council. It has governed within both right-wing and left-wing coalitions and currently acts as Official Opposition to a ruling grand coalition. It is led by Lennart Lundberg. It is part of the Local parties of Uppsala County regional coalition.

== Election results ==
Year	Votes	Percent	Seats
2002	840	11.58%	4/31
2006	982	12.33%	4/31
2010	1416	15.71%	5/31
2014	1274	12.99%	4/31
2018	1796	15.7%	5/31
