= Local parties of Uppsala County =

Coalition of municipal parties in Sweden

The Local Parties of Uppsala County (Swedish: Lokala partier i Uppsala län) is a regional coalition of municipal parties in Uppsala County, Sweden formed in order to contest the 2022 regional elections. Despite local successes for the constituent parties within their respective municipalities, the regional list failed to gain seats within the Uppsala county regional assembly.

It focuses on regional healthcare, infrastructure and transit policy, including the establishment of walk-in centres in the region's peripheries. The coalition is led by Anneli Löfling, who was previously chairman of Knivsta.nu.

The participating parties currently holds representation within most of the county's municipal councils and includes the Bålsta party, Renew Enköping, Knivsta.nu, Älvkarleby Municipal Good, Östhammar Bourgeois Alternative, Håbo democrats and the Tierp list.
