= Tierp List =

The Tierp List Tierpslistan
- Abbreviation: TL
- Leader: Mio Tastas Viktorsson
- Founded: 2021; 5 years ago
- Headquarters: Tierp
- Ideology: Localism; Anti-corruption
- Regional affiliation: Local parties of Uppsala County
- Colours: Green; Yellow
- County council: 0 / 71
- Municipal council: 6 / 41

Website
- www.tierpslistan.se

The Tierp List (Swedish: Tierpslistan, TL) is a local political party in Tierp Municipality, Sweden, led by Mio Tastas Viktorsson. The party entered the municipal assembly of Tierp in 2022.

The party supports lowered wages for politicians, stricter migration policy, and free dental care. It also opposes centralisation of public services within the municipality.

Its logo consists of an iron manhole cover of the type produced within the municipality, with the initials TL engraved.

== Activities ==
Party leader Tastas Viktorsson successfully appealed a decision by the local government to expand various advisory committees in 2023. The decision was found unlawful by an administrative court, as the costs associated with the additional politicians were not funded as required by Swedish municipal law.

The party is inspired and supported by the Örebro party and collaborates with municipal parties both within and outside of Uppsala county through municipal party networks.

In 2024, the party was key to a popular initiative campaign to hold a referendum on stopping the removal of street lighting in many of the municipality's rural areas. The initiative gathered enough support to clear the Swedish legal threshold at the petition stage, but the referendum was stopped by a blocking supermajority of the municipal assembly in December of that year.

The party has endorsed direct municipal control of public facilities rather than ownership through municipal corporations, citing alleged mismanagement and corruption within the latter. In 2025, it supported a popular initiative in favor of that position, resulting in a referendum held alongside the 2026 municipal elections. Direct municipal ownership won a majority of the votes in that referendum.

== Election results in the municipality of Tierp ==
Election	Leader	Votes	%	Seats	+/-	Status
2022	Mio Tastas Viktorsson	607	4.46 (#7)	2 / 49	▲2	Opposition
2026	Mio Tastas Viktorsson	1847	13.48 (#4)	6 / 41	▲4	Pending
