= Mattias Karlsson (politician, born 1977) =

Swedish politician (born 1977)

Mattias Karlsson SD
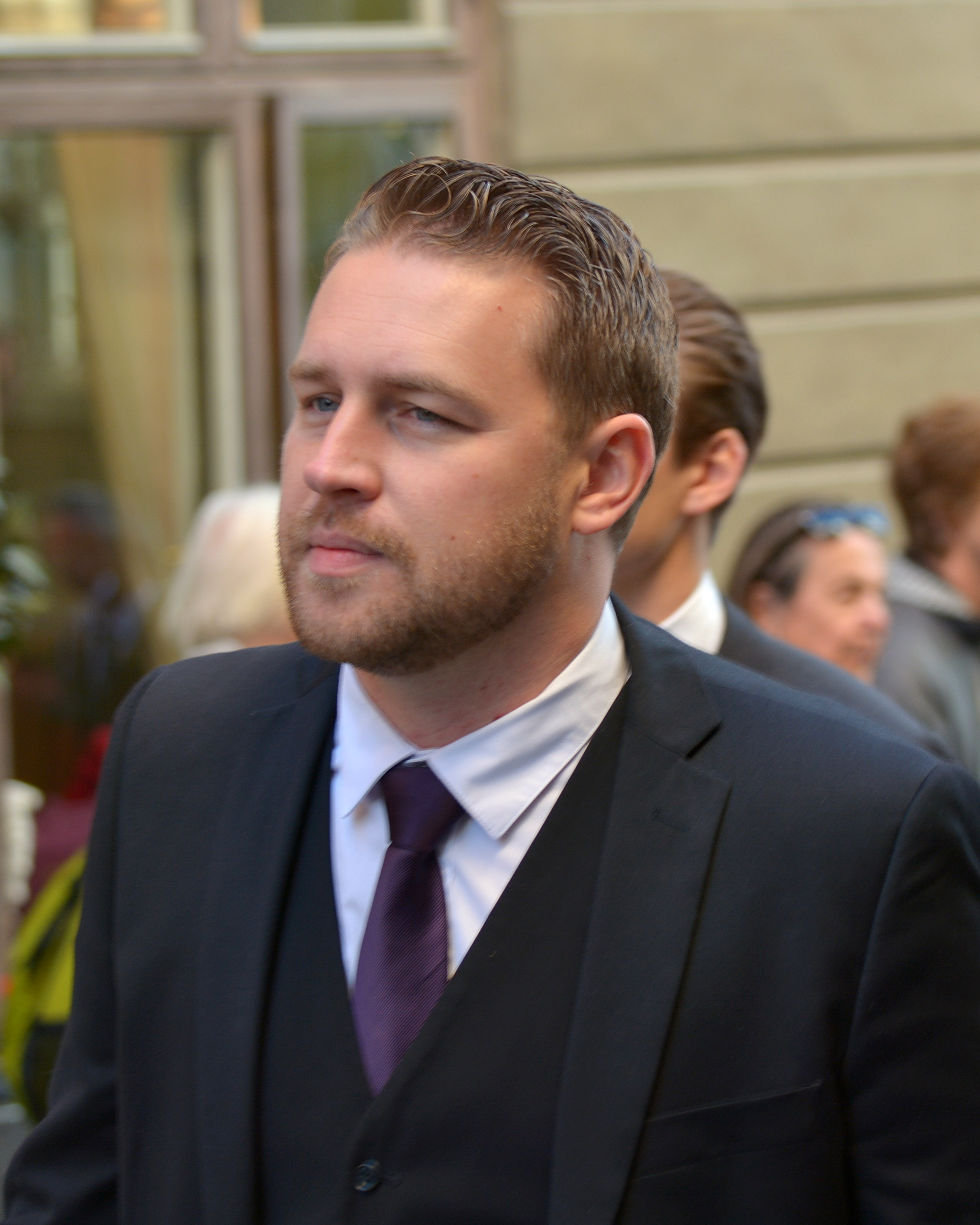

Leader of the Sweden Democrats in the Riksdag
- In office 29 September 2014 – 24 November 2019
- Leader: Jimmie Åkesson
- Preceded by: Björn Söder
- Succeeded by: Henrik Vinge

Leader of the Sweden Democrats (acting) (Note: Jimmie Åkesson was on sick leave due to burnout. Mattias Karlsson was acting party leader.)
- In office 17 October 2014 – 27 March 2015
- Preceded by: Jimmie Åkesson
- Succeeded by: Jimmie Åkesson

Member of the Riksdag
- Incumbent
- Assumed office 4 October 2010
- Constituency: Kronoberg County (2018– ) Scania County (2010–2018)

Personal details
- Born: Hans Kennert Mattias Karlsson; 17 August 1977 (age 49) Rottne, Sweden
- Party: Sweden Democrats
- Domestic partner(s): Gabriella Hedarv (separated)
- Children: 2
- Education: Lund University

Hans Kennert Mattias Hedarv Karlsson (born 17 August 1977) is a Swedish politician, writer and public commentator who served as Leader of the Sweden Democrats in the Riksdag from September 2014 to November 2019. He has been a Member of the Riksdag (SD) since October 2010. He previously served as temporary Leader of the Sweden Democrats from 2014 to 2015.

He currently heads the conservative think-tank Oikos. Since 2022, he has also served as the party's international outreach secretary. Karlsson has also been described as one of the SD's chief philosophical ideologues, having been responsible much of the party's current platform and shift in its beliefs.

== Early life ==
Karlsson was born in Rottne, Växjö Municipality, Kronoberg County. At age 16, he moved to the nearby city of Växjö to begin secondary school at Katedral gymnasium. Following secondary studies, Karlsson moved to Madrid, where he studied for one year. He returned to Sweden in 1999 to Lund, Scania County, enrolling into history and political science at Lund University. During his studies at the university, Karlsson met Jimmie Åkesson, incumbent leader of the Sweden Democrats, Richard Jomshof and Björn Söder. The group later became known as the "Scania Gang" or the "Fantastic Four" and worked to reform the Sweden Democrats and change its ideology in a more moderate direction.

Karlsson describes his early childhood in Rottne as inspiring his later political action:

I know that there is a Swedish culture. I know how it feels to grow up in a homogeneous society, where everyone has the same identity. And when people say, ‘it’s never been like that, Sweden has always been multicultural, that’s all just imaginary,’ I know they’re lying.

== Political career ==
=== Sweden Democrats ===
Karlsson reported having gained his political convictions during his teenage years in Växjö as a result of conflicts with immigrant "kickers" gangs who were engaging in criminal activity in the area and what he described as his resentment towards the lack of Swedish pride and solidarity in society. He described having been inspired by Swedish Viking rock band Ultima Thule. Karlsson claims to have never associated with the sizable neo-Nazi skinhead scene that mobilized during his youth, and claims to have been called a "meatball patriot" by racist skinheads for his moderate and more accepting ideology.

In a 2011 interview with Expo, Karlsson stated that he first took notice of the Sweden Democrats in 1994 and attended a meeting of the local branch in Växjö but chose not join the party at first due to disagreeing with its more hardline stances under Anders Klarström which he considered racist. However, he said that he felt Sweden "needed a new policy" on immigration and national pride, and that he considered himself "a Sweden Democrat without being a member of the party."

Karlsson first joined the Sweden Democrats as an official member in 1999. His first important impact within the Sweden Democrats came in 2002, when he alongside Jimmie Åkesson and former leader Mikael Jansson reshaped the party's political programme. According to Expo, Karlsson also wrote the Sweden Democrats' election manifesto for to the 2006 general election. Since 2008, he is recognized as the leading ideologue of the Sweden Democrats, after its former chief ideologue Johan Rinderheim was forced to leave the party.

Before the Sweden Democrats' entered the Riksdag in 2010, Karlsson worked as a political secretary for the Sweden Democrats council group in Malmö Municipality. He was the party's press secretary at the national level from 2004 to 2010. After the 2010 general election, Karlsson was elected as a Member of the Riksdag (SD). In 2012, Karlsson was appointed deputy leader of the Sweden Democrats in the Riksdag.

Following the 2014 general election, Karlsson was re-elected to the Riksdag. On 29 September 2014, he was appointed leader of the Sweden Democrats in the Riksdag to take over from Jimmie Åkesson who was on sick leave. Since 2022, he has served in the position of international outreach secretary for the party.

On 13 March 2019, Karlsson announced that he would be stepping down as the leader of the Sweden Democrats in the Riksdag. This was officially confirmed on 24 November. His successor was Henrik Vinge.

=== Beliefs ===
Karlsson has referred to himself as a conservative and has cited British philosopher Roger Scruton as an influence, saying that Scruton's work played a role in his beliefs and reforms and ideological changes he made to the SD's platform.

Karlsson has argued that conservatism played a role in Sweden's political stability and reputation for strong social structures until the late twentieth century. He has stated "before the Sixties, even the Social Democrats were somewhat conservative. That was one of the keys to their success. They were able to build on a basis of social conservatism while also talking about social reform. They had the idea of the peoples’ home – Folkhem – and that we should be in solidarity with each other because we belong to each other." However, he said Sweden has now ended up with "radical progressive ideas on culture and civilisation and individualism, and on top of that, a big state" which he believes causes many of Sweden's current political problems.

Karlsson has been vocal against the Islamization of Sweden. In 2015, Karlsson received media attention after comparing Islam to Nazism, saying that the former is currently a bigger threat to national security. In February 2017, Karlsson penned a letter to The Wall Street Journal, along with fellow Sweden Democrats politician Jimmie Åkesson agreeing with President Donald Trump's assertions that Sweden is undergoing a Muslim immigrant-led crime crisis stating: "Mr. Trump did not exaggerate Sweden’s current problems. If anything, he understated them."

Karlsson has also expressed opposition to the European Union and defended Brexit. In a 2017 interview with The Daily Express he argued the EU should not punish Britain for its vote and described the EU as a "zombie," stating "it’s actually dead but still walking. But in the end, it will show that this kind of structure is not sustainable. I think it will fall." He has argued that the EU should exist as a union of sovereign states and that Sweden should "remove as much power as possible from the (EU) superstate." He supports Swedish law coming first before European law.

In February 2020, Karlsson announced his new think-tank Oikos, with members on the steering board such as Malcom Kyeyune, Asle Toje, the ethnographer Dan Korn, and the leader of New Direction, Naweed Khan.

== Notes ==
Party political offices
| Preceded by Björn Söder | Leader of the Sweden Democrats in the Riksdag; 2014–2019 | Succeeded by Henrik Vinge |
