= List of economic left and socially conservative political parties =

The following is a list of political parties which combined left-wing economic policies with conservative social policies.

== Active parties ==
=== Africa ===
Algeria

- National Liberation Front

Libya

- Popular Front for the Liberation of Libya

Senegal

- PASTEF

South Africa

- Al Jama-ah
- UMkhonto weSizwe

Tanzania

- Chama Cha Mapinduzi

=== Americas ===
Brazil

- Workers' Cause Party

United States

- American Communist Party
- American Solidarity Party

Peru

- Free Peru

=== Asia ===
Cambodia

- Cambodian People's Party

China

- Chinese Communist Party

Hong Kong

- Hong Kong Federation of Trade Unions

India

- Samajwadi Party

Iran

- Assembly of the Forces of Imam's Line

Israel

- Shas

Japan

- Komeito

Macau

- Macau Federation of Trade Unions

North Korea

- Workers' Party of Korea

Palestine

- Fatah

Philippines

- Partido Demokratiko Pilipino
- Kilusang Bagong Lipunan
- Pwersa ng Masang Pilipino
- Liberal Party

Vietnam

- Communist Party of Vietnam

Yemen

- Yemeni Socialist Party

=== Europe ===
Bosnia and Herzegovina

- Alliance of Independent Social Democrats

Bulgaria

- Alternative for Bulgarian Revival
- Bulgarian Socialist Party
- Progressive Bulgaria

Czech Republic

- Communist Party of Bohemia and Moravia
- Czech Sovereignty of Social Democracy

Denmark

- Social Democrats

Estonia

- Estonian Centre Party

Georgia

- European Socialists
- Georgian Dream
- Georgian Troupe

Germany

- Alliance Sahra Wagenknecht
- Ecological Democratic Party

Greece

- Communist Party of Greece

Ireland

- Aontú

Italy

- Sovereign Popular Democracy

Lithuania

- Dawn of Nemunas
- Labour Party
- Lithuanian Farmers and Greens Union
- Lithuanian Regions Party
- Union of Democrats "For Lithuania"

Moldova

- Heart of Moldova Republican Party
- Our Party
- Party of Communists of the Republic of Moldova
- Party of Regions of Moldova
- Party of Socialists of the Republic of Moldova
- Revival Party
- Victory

Montenegro

- Democratic People's Party
- Socialist People's Party of Montenegro

Netherlands

- Christian Union
- Denk
- Socialist Party

Poland

- Law and Justice
- Self-Defence of the Republic of Poland
- Slavic Union

Romania

- Great Romania Party
- Nation People Together
- Social Democratic Party

Russia

- Communist Party of the Russian Federation
- A Just Russia – For Truth

Slovakia

- Direction – Social Democracy
- Voice – Social Democracy

Spain

- Spanish Alternative
- Workers' Front

Sweden

- Örebro Party

Ukraine

- All-Ukrainian Union "Fatherland"
- Social Democratic Party of Ukraine (united)

United Kingdom

- Social Democratic Party
- Workers Party of Britain

=== Oceania ===
Australia

- Katter's Australian Party
- Democratic Labour Party

New Zealand

- New Zealand First

== Former parties ==
=== Africa ===
Libya

- Arab Socialist Union

Somalia

- Somali Revolutionary Socialist Party

=== Americas ===
Argentina

- Peronist Party

=== Asia ===
China

- China Democratic Socialist Party

Japan

- Democratic Socialist Party
- Japan Cooperative Party

Iraq

- Arab Socialist Ba'ath Party – Iraq Region

Syria

- Arab Socialist Ba'ath Party – Syria Region

=== Europe ===
Czech Republic

- Party of Civic Rights

Denmark

- Common Course

Greece

- Communist Party of Greece

Germany

- Nazi Party

Italy

- National Fascist Party

Moldova

- Șor Party (banned)

Montenegro

- Workers' Party

Netherlands

- Christian Social Party
- Democratic Socialists '70

Romania

- Romanian Communist Party

Slovakia

- Union of the Workers of Slovakia

Sweden

- Folklistan

Russia

- National Bolshevik Party (banned)

USSR

- Communist Party of the Soviet Union

Ukraine

- Communist Party of Ukraine (banned)

United Kingdom

- Alba Party

== See also ==
- Left-conservatism
- MAGA communism
- Old Left
- National Bolshevism
- Third International Theory
- Third Position
- Peronism
