= Election Authority (Sweden) =

Government agency responsible for vote counting in Sweden

Swedish Election Authority
- Valmyndigheten
- Official logo

Agency overview
- Formed: 1 July 2001
- Preceding agency: Swedish National Tax Board
- Headquarters: Solna Municipality, Stockholm County, Sweden
- Employees: ca. 20
- Parent agency: Ministry of Culture
- Website: www.val.se

The Swedish Election Authority (Swedish: Valmyndigheten) is a government agency responsible for organizing national elections and referendums in Sweden. The agency began its operations on 1 July 2001 when it took over the responsibilities from the Swedish National Tax Board.

Local and regional elections are the responsibility of the respective municipalities and county councils, however these elections always take place concurrently with the national elections for the Riksdag. As the central administrative authority for elections, the Swedish Election Authority has an instrumental role in all public elections in Sweden. The authority is also responsible for elections to Sámi Parliament of Sweden.

== See also ==
- Elections in Sweden
- Referendums in Sweden
