= Oikos (Swedish think-tank) =

Swedish conservative think-tank

- Formation: 2020; 6 years ago
- Legal status: Private company
- Headquarters: Sweden
- Director: Mattias Karlsson
- Website: oikos.se

Oikos (from the ancient Greek οἶκος 'home; household') is a Swedish conservative think-tank founded by politician Mattias Karlsson, the former group leader for the Sweden Democrats in the Riksdag.

== Politics ==
Oikos states that it draws its name meaning home in a political sense from the philosophy of Sir Roger Scruton and stands for "love, respect, loyalty and a sense of duty in relation to one's own home, defined in terms of family, homeland, civil society, nation, culture and civilization." Karlsson has described the think-tank's mission as providing education, a debate platform and leadership to aid conservatives in Sweden, but also claims it will be non-partisan, function independently and feature opinions from a variety of individuals. It also claims to be Sweden's first officially conservative think-tank. It has allegedly received financial support from Karlsson's party, the Sweden Democrats, with Expo calling the organization an "extension of the Sweden Democrats' political project".

Although the think-tank has not made any direct statement on the types of policies they are advocating for, they emphasize the protection of what they consider to be "organically developed communities", in the form of the family, civil society and the nation state. Against this is individualism, class struggle and internationalism, where the latter is exemplified by organizations such as the European Union and the United Nations, according to the think-tank.

== Board of trustees ==
Oikos lists its Board of Trustees and steering committee as:

- Naweed Khan, director of the New Direction group and former advisor to David Cameron.
- Asle Toje, scholar, researcher and vice-president of the Norwegian Nobel Committee.
- Mattias Karlsson, member of the Riksdag for the Sweden Democrats
- Arvid Hallén, Program Director at Oikos.
