= Region Örebro County =

Regional council of Örebro County, Sweden

Region Örebro County Region Örebro län
- Regional council
- Region: Örebro County
- Country: Sweden
- Website: Official website

Legislative branch
- Legislature: Regional assembly
- Assembly members: 71

Executive branch
- Main body: Regional Executive Committee

Region Örebro County (Swedish: Region Örebro län) is the regional council of Örebro County in Sweden.

Council has 71 members. After 2018 elections the largest parties are Social Democratic Party, Moderate Party and Sweden Democrats, in that order.

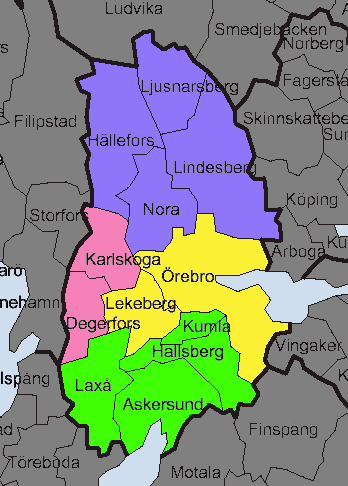
Örebro regional council constituencies in elections to Regional Council.
