= Cecilia Skingsley =

Swedish banker, economist, journalist and governor (born 1968)

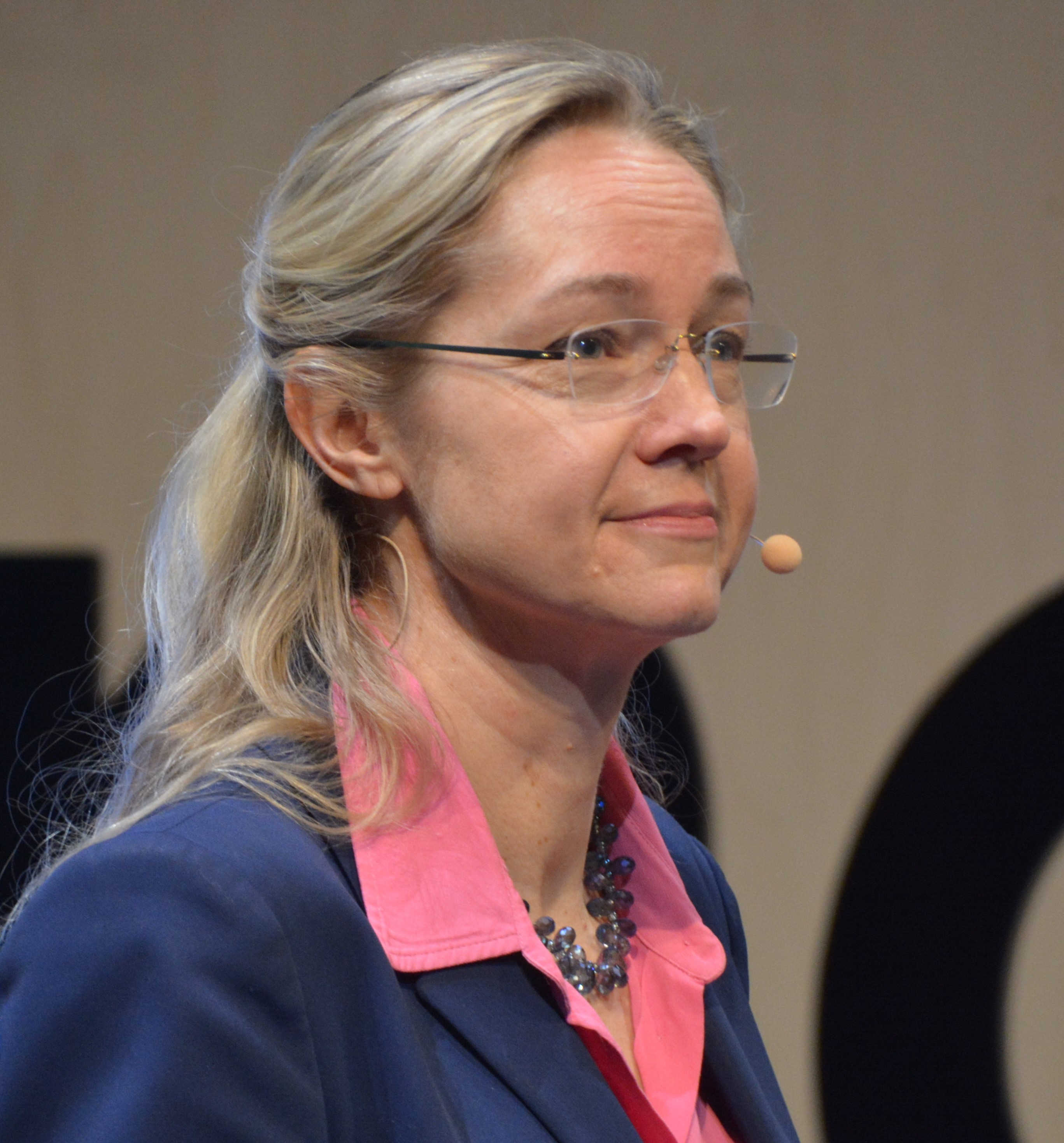

Governor of Stockholm County
- Incumbent
- Assumed office 16 June 2025
- Monarch: Carl XVI Gustaf
- Prime Minister: Ulf Kristersson
- Preceded by: Anna Kinberg Batra; Claes Lindgren (acting)

First Deputy Governor of Sveriges Riksbank
- In office 8 November 2019 – 15 August 2022
- Governor: Stefan Ingves
- Preceded by: Kerstin af Jochnick
- Succeeded by: Anna Breman

Member of the Executive Board of Governors of Sveriges Riksbank
- In office 22 May 2013 – 15 August 2022
- Governor: Stefan Ingves
- Preceded by: Barbro Wickman-Parak
- Succeeded by: Aino Bunge

Personal details
- Born: 18 August 1968 (age 58) Stockholm, Sweden
- Education: Stockholm University

Marie Annie Cecilia Skingsley (née Bystedt; born 18 August 1968) is a Swedish banker, economist and journalist who serves as Governor of Stockholm County since 16 June 2025.

She previously served on the executive board of governors of Sveriges Riksbank, the central bank of Sweden, from 2013 to 2022, and as its first deputy governor from 2019 to 2022. She was head of the BIS Innovation Hub, at the Bank for International Settlements, from 2022 to 2025.

== Education ==
Skingsley holds a BA in economics and political science from Stockholm University. She received a financial analyst degree from SSE Executive Education at Stockholm School of Economics (formerly IFL at Stockholm School of Economics) and studied journalism at Poppius School of Journalism in Stockholm.

== Career ==
Skingsley began her career as a radio journalist at SAF Radio City in Stockholm. She became the press secretary at the Swedish Ministry of Finance in 1991, and was the personal spokesperson for Bo Lundgren. She became the press secretary for Carl Bildt in 1994. In 1995 she moved to Dagens industri as a financial journalist. Skingsley became the head of FX and fixed income research at Swedbank in 2007, and became a chief economist there in 2013. Skingsley was appointed First Deputy Governor of the Riksbank in November 2019, replacing Kerstin af Jochnick. In June 2022, she was appointed Head of the BIS Innovation Hub at the Bank for International Settlements. She subsequently left her role as First Deputy Governor of Sveriges Riksbank, where she was succeeded by Anna Breman.
