= Edén cabinet =

Swedish cabinet formed by Nils Edén in 1917

Nils Edén's cabinet
- 21st Cabinet of Sweden

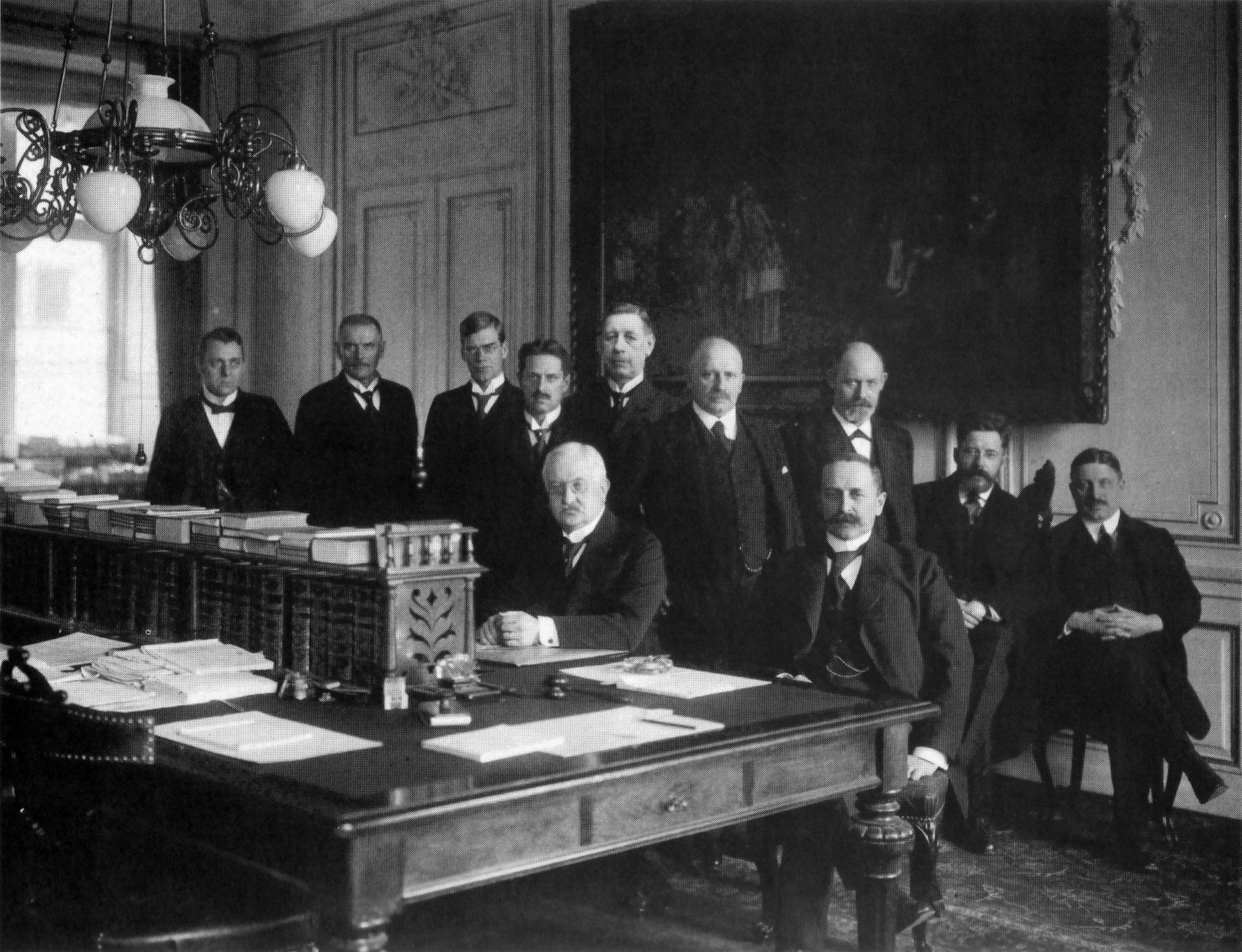
- The Edén cabinet. From the left: Petrén, Nilson, Undén, Palmstierna, Hellner, Petersson, Schotte, Edén, Thorsson, Rydén, Löfgren. Missing from the image are Holmqvist, Branting and Olsson.
- Date formed: 19 October 1917
- Date dissolved: 10 March 1920

People and organisations
- Head of state: Gustav V
- Head of government: Nils Edén
- Total no. of members: 11
- Member parties: Social Democrats; Liberal Coalition Party
- Status in legislature: Coalition minority (upper house); Coalition majority (lower house)
- Opposition parties: General Electoral League; Swedish Social Democratic Left Party; Farmers' League; National Agrarian Union

History
- Incoming formation: 1917 election
- Election: 1917 election
- Predecessor: Swartz cabinet
- Successor: Branting I cabinet

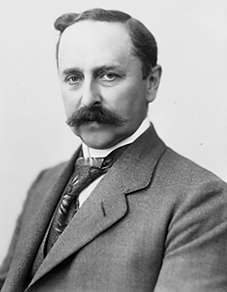
Prime Minister Nils Edén.

The Edén cabinet (Swedish: regeringen Edén) was the government of Sweden from 19 October 1917 to 10 March 1920. It was a coalition government between the Social Democrats and the Liberal Coalition Party, led by Prime Minister Nils Edén of the Liberal Coalition Party. It was the first time that the Social Democrats were part of a Swedish cabinet.

The cabinet succeeded the conservative Swartz cabinet and was succeeded by the social democratic Branting I cabinet.

== Ministers ==
The cabinet consisted of eleven ministers in eight departments. Of the ministers were nine chiefs of departments and two consultative ministers. Six of the ministers belonged to the Liberal Coalition Party, four to the Social Democrats and one was independent.

Portfolio	Minister	Took office	Left office	Party	Ref
Prime Minister's Office
Prime Minister, Head of the Prime Minister's Office	Nils Edén	19 October 1917	10 March 1920	Liberals	
Ministry of Justice
Minister for Justice, Head of the Ministry for Justice	Eliel Löfgren	19 October 1917	10 March 1920	Liberals	
Ministry for Foreign Affairs
Minister for Foreign Affairs, Head of the Ministry for Foreign Affairs	Johannes Hellner	19 October 1917	10 March 1920	Independent	
Ministry for Army Affairs
Minister for Army Affairs, Head of the Ministry for Army Affairs	Erik Nilson	19 October 1917	10 March 1920	Liberals	
Ministry for Naval Affairs
Minister for Naval Affairs, Head of the Ministry for Naval Affairs	Erik Palmstierna	19 October 1917	10 March 1920	Social Democrats	
Ministry of Finance
Minister for Finance, Head of the Ministry for Finance	Hjalmar Branting	19 October 1917	5 January 1918	Social Democrats	
Minister for Finance, Head of the Ministry for Finance	Fredrik Vilhelm Thorsson	5 January 1918	30 June 1920 (Note: Continued on the ministerial post in the next cabinet.)	Social Democrats	
Ministry of Education and Ecclesiastical Affairs
Minister of Education and Ecclesiastical Affairs, Head of the Ministry of Education and Ecclesiastical Affairs	Värner Rydén	19 October 1917	28 November 1919	Social Democrats	
Minister of Education and Ecclesiastical Affairs, Head of the Ministry of Education and Ecclesiastical Affairs	Olof Olsson	28 November 1919	27 October 1920	Social Democrats	
Ministry of Agriculture
Minister for Agriculture, Head of the Ministry of Agriculture	Alfred Petersson	19 October 1917	10 March 1920	Liberals	
Ministry for Civil Service Affairs
Minister for Civil Service Affairs, Head of the Ministry for Civil Service Affairs	Axel Schotte	19 October 1917	28 November 1919	Liberals	
Minister for Civil Service Affairs, Head of the Ministry for Civil Service Affairs	Fredrik Holmquist	28 November 1919	10 March 1920	Liberals	
Ministers without portfolio
Consultative ministers	Bror Petrén	19 October 1917	10 March 1920	Liberals	
Consultative ministers	Östen Undén	19 October 1917	10 March 1920	Social Democrats	

== Notes ==
Preceded by Swartz cabinet	Cabinet of Sweden; 1917–1920	Succeeded by Branting I cabinet
