= Skingsley =

Skingsley is a surname. Notable people with the surname include:

- Anthony Skingsley (1933–2019), Royal Air Force commander
- Cecilia Skingsley (born 1968), Swedish banker, economist and journalist
