= Kerstin af Jochnick =

Swedish economist (born 1958)

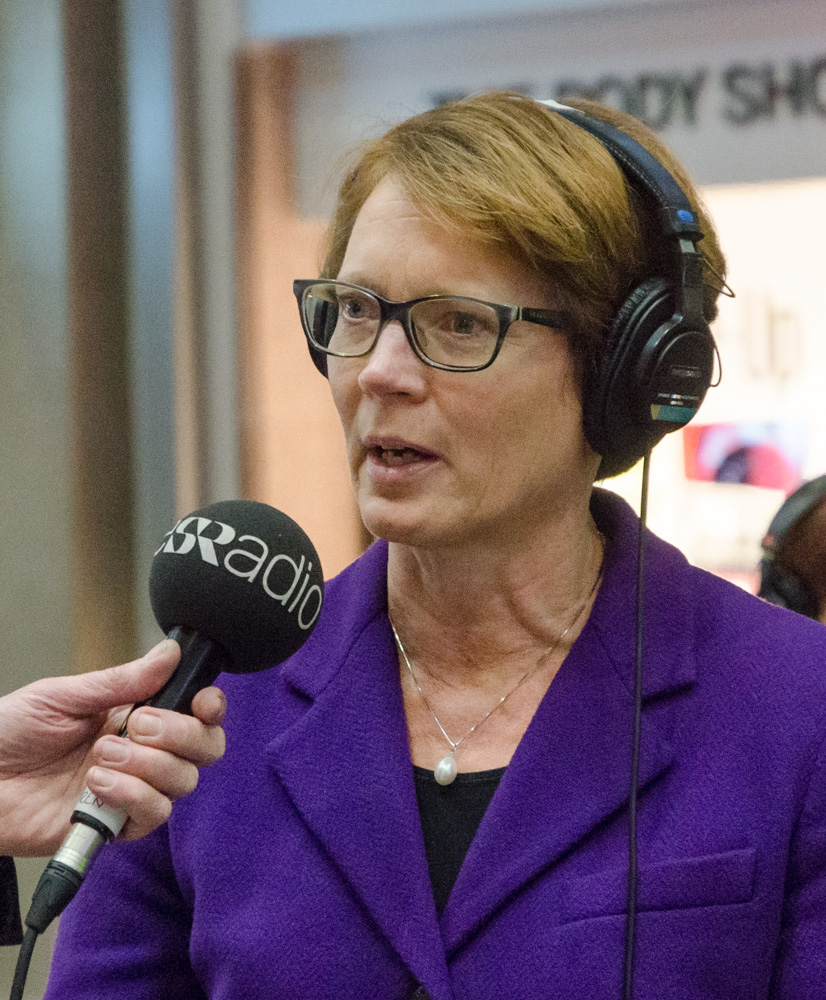
- Kerstin af Jochnick being interviewed in 2017 by Sveriges Radio

First Deputy Governor of Sveriges Riksbank
- In office 1 January 2012 – 30 September 2019

Personal details
- Born: Kerstin Margareta Joelsson; 17 March 1958 (age 68) Virserum, Sweden
- Education: Stockholm University

Kerstin Margareta af Jochnick (born March 17, 1958) is a Swedish banker and economist. She is currently serving as a member of the ECB Supervisory Board, and was the former First Deputy Governor of the Sveriges Riksbank, the central bank of Sweden.

== Early life ==
Kerstin af Jochnick graduated with a degree in economics, statistics and law studies from Stockholm University.

== Career ==
Af Jochnick started her career in 1976 at Sparbanken Kronoberg, a savings bank, before moving to the Riksbank the following year. In 1991 she joined the Swedish financial supervisory authority Finansinspektionen, and in 2004 she joined the Committee of European Banking Supervisors as part of the supporting office. Af Jochnick was appointed Chair of the Committee of European Banking Supervisors in January 2008 and held her position until September 2009, when she was succeeded by Giovanni Carosio.

In December 2011, af Jochnick was appointed as the First Deputy Governor of the Riksbank, under Governor Stefan Ingves, and assumed her position in January 2012. Her term was extended in 2017 to run until the end of 2023, but she left office in July 2019 to assume a new position at the European Central Bank. af Jochnick was succeeded in this position by Cecilia Skingsley (who replaced her as First Deputy Governor) and Anna Breman (who was appointed new Deputy Governor and member of the executive board).

The Governing Council of the European Central Bank appointed af Jochnick as the ECB representative to the Supervisory Board of the European Central Bank, where she has held the position since October 2019.

== Other activities ==
- Leibniz Institute for Financial Research (SAFE), Member of the Policy Council
