= Mats Hellström =

Swedish politician (1942–2026)

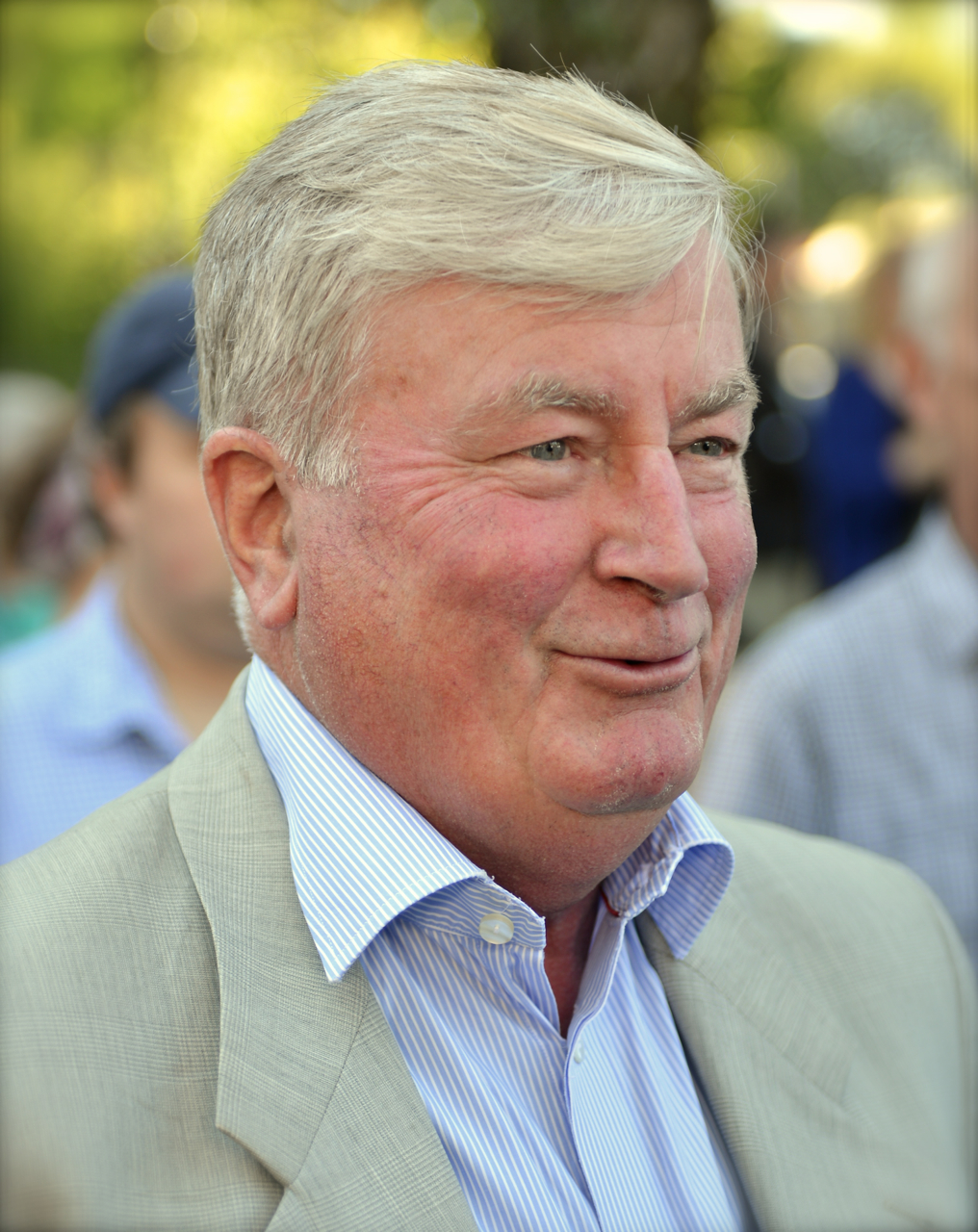
Hellström in 2013

Mats Johan Hellström (12 January 1942 – 24 May 2026) was a Swedish Social Democratic politician. He was minister of foreign trade from 1983 to 1986, minister for agriculture from 1986 to 1991 and minister of foreign trade again from 1994 to 1996. He replaced Svante Lundkvist as agriculture minister in 1986. During his term as agriculture minister Michael Sohlman was his state secretary.

Hellström was born in Stockholm on 12 January 1942. He was the Swedish Ambassador to Germany from 1996 to 2001. Hellström also served as the governor of Stockholm County between 2002 and 2006. He died on 24 May 2026, at the age of 84.

Political offices
Preceded by Lennart Bodström	Minister for Foreign Trade; 1983–1986	Succeeded by Anita Gradin
Preceded by Svante Lundkvist	Minister of Agriculture; 1986–1991	Succeeded by Karl Erik Olsson
Preceded by Ulf Dinkelspiel	Minister for Foreign Trade; 1994–1996	Succeeded by Björn von Sydow
Preceded by Ulf Dinkelspiel	Minister for EU Affairs; 1994–1996	Succeeded by None
Diplomatic posts
Preceded by Örjan Berner	Ambassador of Sweden to Germany; 1996–2001	Succeeded by Carl Tham
Civic offices
Preceded by Ulf Adelsohn	Governor of Stockholm County; 2002–2006	Succeeded by Per Unckel
