= Michael Treschow =

Swedish businessman (born 1943)

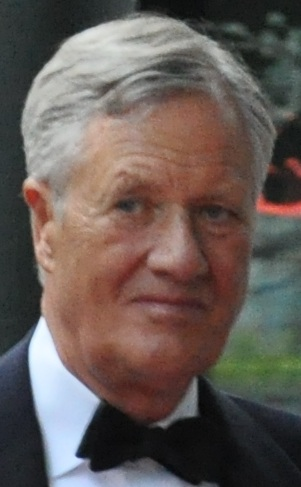
- Michael Treschow in 2010
- Born: April 22, 1943 (age 83); Helsingborg, Skåne län, Sweden
- Education: Lund University
- Occupation: Businessman

Niels Michael Aage Treschow (born April 22, 1943) is a Swedish businessman. As chairman of the board of both Unilever since 2007 and the Confederation of Swedish Enterprise, and former chairman of Ericsson, Treschow is one of the most influential people in Swedish business today.

== Early life ==
Michael Treschow was born on April 22, 1943, in Helsingborg, Skåne län, Sweden. His father was a major in the Swedish Army.

Treschow graduated with a degree in engineering from Lund University.

== Career ==
Treschow started his career at Atlas Copco, where he eventually became CEO. Later, he served as CEO of Electrolux. He is now chairman of Electrolux as well. In 2002 he became chairman at Ericsson. These positions were followed by his election at the Confederation of Swedish Enterprise, a lobbying organization for Sweden's larger companies. Treschow was also a board member at ABB.

Treschow serves as the chairman of Unilever until 2023.

Treschow serves as the chairman of the board, Research Institute of Industrial Economics (IFN). He is a member of the Royal Swedish Academy of Engineering Sciences and a recipient of the Légion d'honneur.

== Personal life ==
Treschow has been married twice and he has two children, Adam Treschow and Adéle Treschow.
