= Governor of Stockholm County =

- Landshövding i Stockholms län
- Coat of arms of Stockholm County.

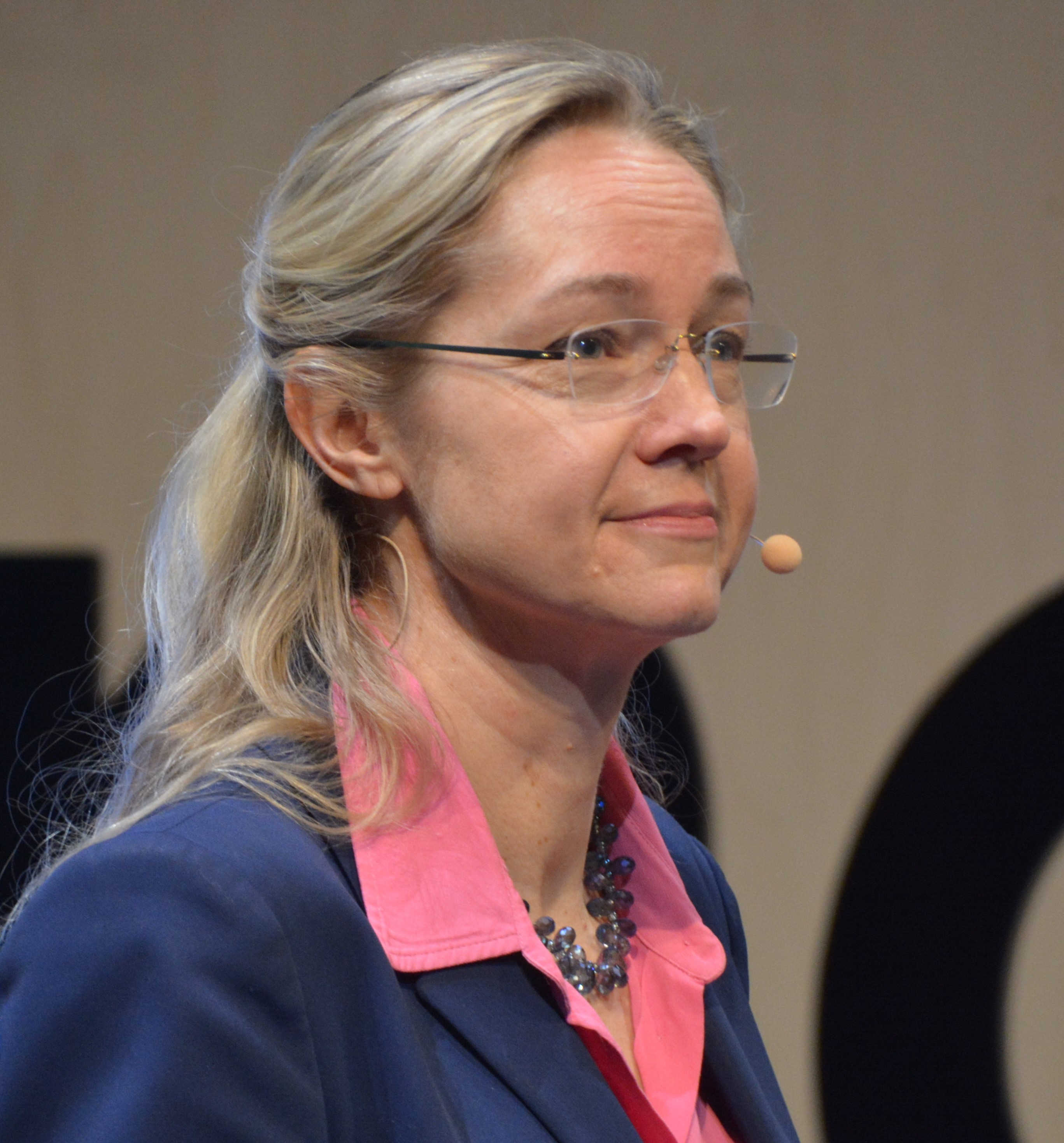
- Incumbent; Cecilia Skingsley since 16 June 2025
- Stockholm County Administrative Board
- Residence: Tessin Palace
- Seat: Stockholm
- Appointer: Government of Sweden
- Term length: Six years (Note: The governor is often appointed for a six-year mandate. It can be extended if the person has not reached retirement age.)
- Formation: 1641
- First holder: Ture Oxenstierna af Eka och Lindö
- Deputy: Deputy County Governor (Länsöverdirektören)
- Salary: SEK 102,800/month (2017)
- Website: Governor and Deputy County Governor

This is a list of governors for Stockholm County of Sweden. Stockholm County separated from Uppland County, the first time from 1641 to 1654, and then finally in 1719. The City of Stockholm was separately governed by the Governor of Stockholm until 1967, when it was integrated into Stockholm County. The governors reside in Tessin Palace.

== Governors ==
=== First period ===
Picture	Governor	Took office	Left office
	Ture Oxenstierna af Eka och Lindö	1641	1645
	Axel Natt och Dag	1645	1647
	Bengt Skytte	1647	1649
	Svante Larsson Sparre	1649	1651
	Lars Claesson Fleming	25 June 1652	1654

=== Second period ===
Picture	Governor	Took office	Left office
	Ture Stensson Bielke	1714	1717
	Axel Claesson Banér	1718	1718
	Olof Törnflycht	1719	1727
	Frans Joachim Ehrenstrahl	14 August 1727	1733
	Gustaf Palmfelt	6 August 1733	1737
	Otto Magnus Wolffelt	1737	1743
	Theodor Ankarcrona	10 February 1743	2 November 1750 (Note: Held the position until his death on 2 November 1750.)
	Adolf Mörner af Morlanda	1750	1751
	Carl C:son Broman	1751	1762
	Carl Fredrik Nordenstam	1762	1768
	Carl Gustaf Lieven	1768	1770
	Jacob Johan Gyllenborg	1770	1778
	Samuel af Ugglas	1788	1802
	Evert Georgii	1802	1808
	Erik Adolf af Schenbom	1808	1810
	Daniel Edelcreutz	20 December 1810	6 October 1828 (Note: Held the position until his death on 6 October 1828.)
	?	1828	1830
	Claes Hans Rålamb	1830	1842
	Clas Fredric Horn	6 May 1843 (Note: Acting from 23 July 1842.)	16 March 1849
	Gustaf Liljencrants	12 June 1849	5 July 1867
	Wilhelm Stråle af Ekna	1867	1888
	Robert Themptander	1888	1896
	Lennart Groll	6 October 1896	1896 (Note: Died three weeks after assuming office.)
	Paul Isberg	1896	1908
	Mauritz Sahlin	1909	1919
	Daniel Ekelund	1919	1920
	Alfred Petersson	10 March 1920 (Note: Never took office due to sickness.)	10 March 1920
	Nils Edén	3 December 1920	31 August 1938
	Karl Levinson	1 September 1938 (Note: Appointed 31 August 1938.)	March 1952
	Gunnar Danielson	1952	1958
	Erik Westerlind	1958	1968

=== Including the City of Stockholm ===
Picture	Governor	Took office	Left office
	Allan Nordenstam	1 January 1968 (Note: Appointed on 25 May 1967.)	30 September 1971
	Hjalmar Mehr	1971	1977
	Gunnar Helén	1977	1984
	Lennart Sandgren	1985	1991
	Ulf Adelsohn	1992	2001
	Mats Hellström	1 January 2002	2006
	Per Unckel	2007	20 September 2011
	Katarina Kämpe	2011	2012 (Note: Acting, after Unckel's death on 20 September 2011.)
	Chris Heister	1 February 2012	31 August 2017
	Åsa Ryding	1 September 2017	31 January 2018 (Note: Acting.)
	Sven-Erik Österberg	1 February 2018	28 February 2023
	Anna Kinberg Batra	1 March 2023	3 October 2024
	Claes Lindgren (acting)	3 October 2024	16 June 2025
	Cecilia Skingsley	16 June 2025	
