= Erik Thedéen =

Governor of Riksbank

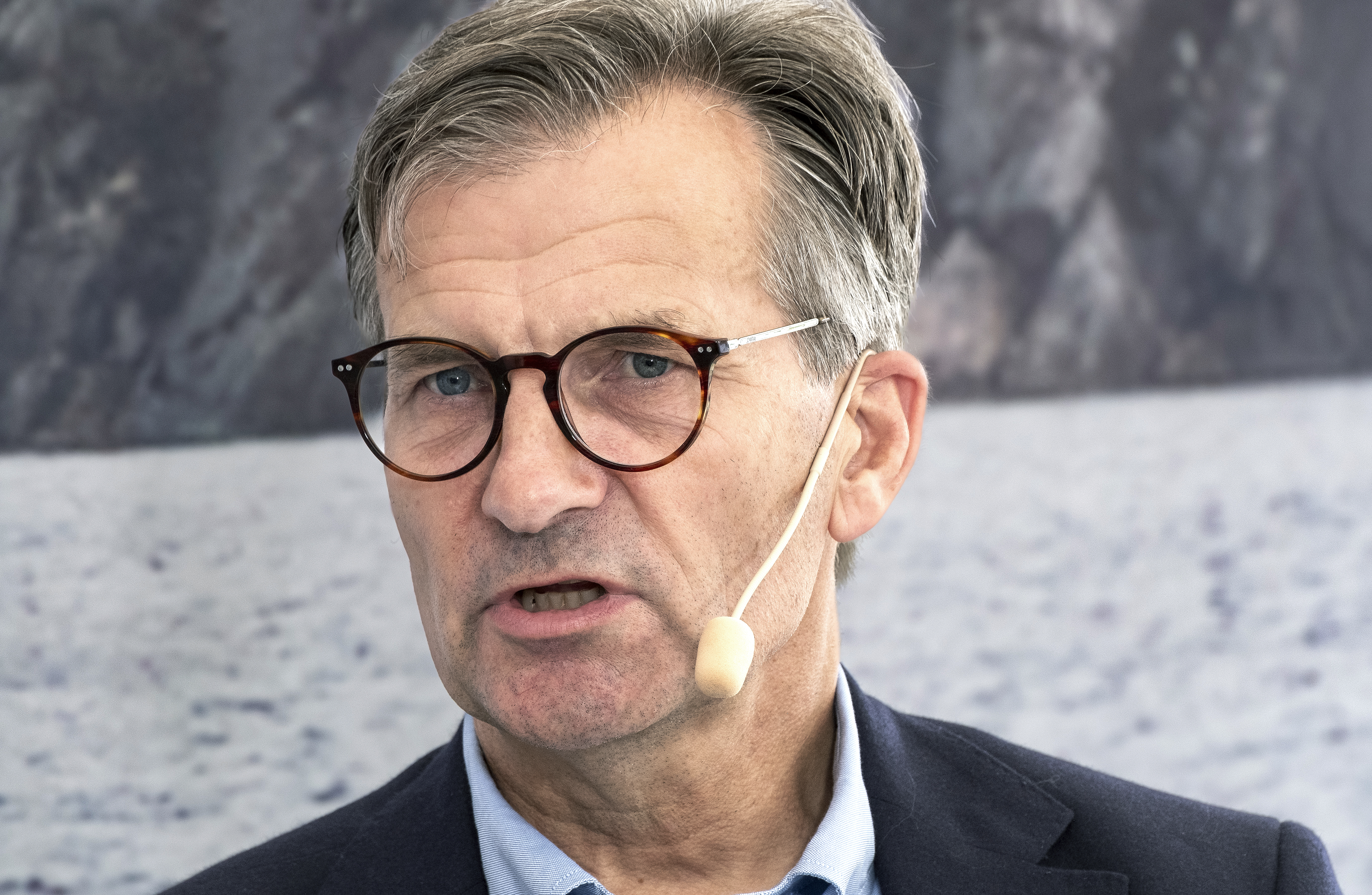

Governor of Sveriges Riksbank
- Incumbent
- Assumed office 1 January 2023
- Preceded by: Stefan Ingves

Personal details
- Born: Erik Hilding Thedéen; 1 September 1963 (age 63) Spånga, Sweden
- Education: Stockholm School of Economics
- Occupation: Governor, Sveriges Riksbank
- Profession: Economist

Erik Hilding Thedéen (born 1 September 1963) is a Swedish economist, business leader and civil servant, who served as Director General of the Swedish Financial Supervisory Authority from 2015 to 2022. Since 1 January 2023 he serves as the Governor of Sveriges Riksbank, the central bank of Sweden.

== Early life and education ==
He is from Spånga, Sweden and has three brothers. His parents are statistics professor Torbjörn Thedéen and jurist Ulla Ljunggren-Thedéen. After graduating from school in 1982, Thedéen completed his military service and continued his education at the Royal Swedish Naval Academy. Thedéen is a reserve officer in the Swedish Navy, trained for service on a patrol boat. Thedéen studied for a master's degree in economics at the Stockholm School of Economics 1985–1989.

== Career ==
Thedéen has a history of roles in the financial industry, including roles as chief executive of KPA Pension, at the Swedish Ministry of Finance and as president of Nasdaq OMX Nordic in Stockholm.

== Other activities ==
- Bank for International Settlements (BIS), Ex-Officio Member of the Board of Directors (since 2023)
- International Monetary Fund (IMF), Ex-Officio Member of the Board of Governors (since 2022)
