= Stefan Ingves =

Swedish economist and civil servant (born 1953)

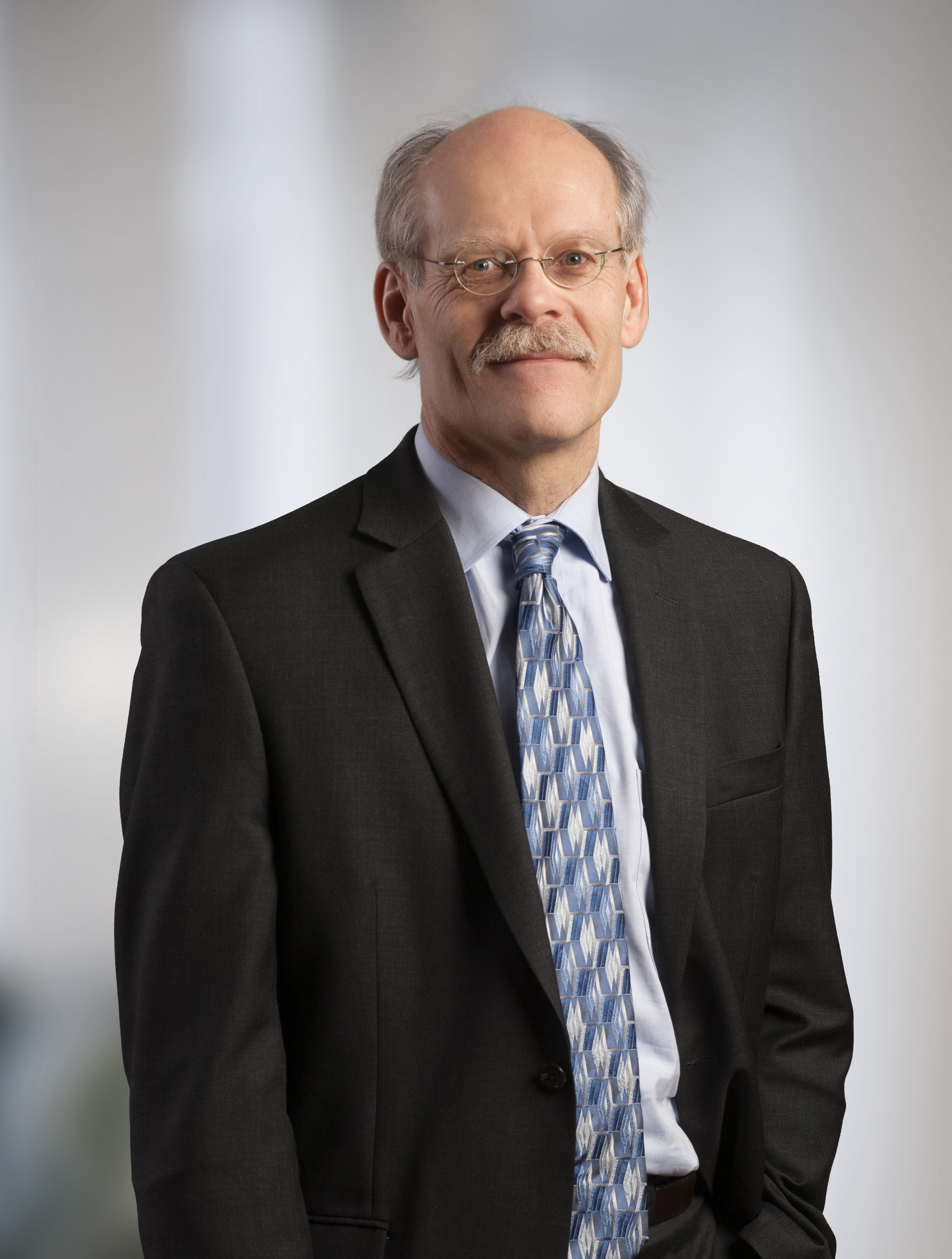

Governor of Sveriges Riksbank
- In office 1 January 2006 – 31 December 2022
- Deputy: Cecilia Skingsley
- Preceded by: Lars Heikensten
- Succeeded by: Erik Thedéen

Personal details
- Born: Stefan Nils Magnus Ingves; 23 May 1953 (age 73) Turku, Finland
- Education: Stockholm School of Economics
- Occupation: Banker and civil servant.
- Profession: Economist.

Stefan Nils Magnus Ingves (born 23 May 1953) is a Finnish-born Swedish banker, economist and civil servant who served as the Governor of Sveriges Riksbank, the central bank of Sweden, from 2006 to 2022. He serves as the vice-chairman of the Bank for International Settlements (BIS) since November 2021. In June 2022, Ingves announced that he will resign as Governor of Sveriges Riksbank on 31 December 2022. He was succeeded in the role by the former director of the Swedish Financial Supervisory Authority, Erik Thedéen.

== Early life ==
Ingves has a Finland Swedish background and grew up in the village of Närpes in western Finland.

In 1984, he earned a Ph.D. in Economics at the Stockholm School of Economics and his thesis is called "aspects of trade credits", about credit models between companies.

== Career ==
Ingves was named Governor of Sveriges Riksbank in 2006. In response to the 2008-2011 Icelandic financial crisis, Ingves argued that "in times of uncertainty and turmoil, the central banks have a responsibility to cooperate." Ingves confronted the "task of safeguarding macroeconomic and financial stability" in 2008; and in 2009, he presided over a decline to the lowest official Swedish interest rate since records began in 1907.

From 2011 until 2019, Ingves served as the Chairman of the Basel Committee on Banking Supervision.

== Other activities ==
- Bank for International Settlements (BIS), Ex-Officio Member of the Board of Directors
- Financial Stability Board (FSB), Ex-Officio Member of the Standing Committee on Supervisory and Regulatory Cooperation
- International Monetary Fund (IMF), Ex-Officio Member of the Board of Governors

== Selected works ==
In a statistical overview derived from writings by and about Stefan Ingves, OCLC/WorldCat encompasses roughly 40+ works in 50+ publications in 3 languages and 150+ library holdings .

- Den oreglerade kreditmarknaden : en expertrapport från 1980 års kreditpolitiska utredning (1981)
- Aspects of Trade Credit (1984)
- The Nordic Banking Crisis from an International Perspective (2002)
- Issues in the Establishment of Asset Management Companies (2004)
- Lessons Learned from Previous Banking Crises: Sweden, Japan, Spain, and Mexico (2009)
- Central Bank Management (2009)

== Notes ==
Government offices
Preceded by Lars Heikensten	Governor of the Swedish National Bank; 2006–2022	Succeeded by Erik Thedéen
