= 2003 Swedish euro referendum =

- 14 September 2003
- Do you think that Sweden should introduce the euro as currency?

Results
Choice	Votes	%
Yes	2,453,899	42.02%
No	3,265,341	55.91%
Blank votes	121,073	2.07%
Valid votes	5,840,313	99.94%
Invalid votes	3,475	0.06%
Total votes	5,843,788	100.00%
Registered voters/turnout	7,077,502	82.57%

Results
Yes
50%-60%
60%-70%
70%-80%
No
50%-60%
60%-70%
70%-80%
80%-90%

Eurozone participation European Union member states (special territories not shown) 21 in the eurozone 1 in ERM II, with an opt-out (Denmark) 5 not in ERM II, but committed to join the eurozone after meeting the convergence criteria (Czech Republic, Hungary, Poland, Romania, and Sweden) Non–EU member states 4 using the euro with a monetary agreement (Andorra, Monaco, San Marino, and Vatican City) 2 using the euro unilaterally (Kosovo and Montenegro)

A non-binding referendum on introduction of the euro was held in Sweden on 14 September 2003. The majority voted not to adopt the euro, and thus Sweden decided in 2003 not to adopt the euro for the time being. Had they voted in favour, the plan was that Sweden would have adopted the euro on 1 January 2006.

The ballot text was "Do you think that Sweden should introduce the euro as currency?" (Swedish: Anser du att Sverige skall införa euron som valuta?). Sweden in Europe was the main umbrella group campaigning for a Yes vote. The No vote campaign was led by two organisations, representing left (Folkrörelsen Nej till EU) and right-wing politicians respectively. The political parties were divided, with the Centre Party, Left Party and Green Party being against, and the Social Democrats, Moderates, Christian Democrats and Liberal People's Party being for. However, the ruling Social Democrats were internally divided over the issue, with five cabinet members coming out for the "no" alternative.

As of 2026, this is the most recent national referendum in Sweden.

== Background ==
Sweden joined the European Union in 1995, and its treaty of accession has since obliged it to join the euro. However, one of the requirements for eurozone membership is two years' membership of ERM II, and Sweden has chosen not to join this mechanism (which would have required them to tie its exchange rate to the euro ±2.25%). While there is government support for membership, all parties have pledged not to join without a referendum in favour of doing so.

== Debates ==
2003 Swedish euro referendum debates
Date	Time	Organizers	Moderators	P Present I Invitee N Non-invitee							
Date	Time	Organizers	Moderators	S	M	L	KD	V	C	MP	Refs
4 June 2003		Swedish Confederation of Professional Employees	Mats Knutson	P Göran Persson	P Bo Lundgren	P Lars Leijonborg	P Alf Svensson	P Ulla Hoffmann	P Maud Olofsson	P Peter Eriksson	

== Results ==
The voter turnout was 82.6%, and the result was 55.9% against and 42.0% in favour. A majority of voters in Stockholm voted in favour of adopting the euro (54.7% "yes", 43.2% "no"). In Scania and Stockholm counties the "yes" votes (49.3%) outnumbered the "no" votes (48.5%), although the invalid and blank votes resulted in no majority for either option. In all other parts of Sweden, the majority voted no. Among municipalities, a majority of those in western Scania, and in Stockholm, voted yes. Kungsbacka and Haparanda also voted "yes". All other municipalities voted "no".

For five of seven parties in parliament, a majority of their voters voted in line with their party's opinion. The exceptions were the voters sympathizing with the Social Democrats and the Christian Democrats, where a majority in both cases voted against the euro despite their parties' "yes" stances.

Summary of the referendum	Votes	Percent
Yes	2,453,899	42.0
No	3,265,341	55.9
Blank votes	121,073	2.1
Total	5,840,313	100
Invalid votes	3,475	
Eligible voters	7,077,502	
Turnout	5,843,788	82.6

Source: Nationalencyklopedin
See also: Swedish Election Authority

== See also ==
- Sweden and the euro
- Referendums in Sweden
