= Lars Heikensten =

Swedish governor (born 1950)

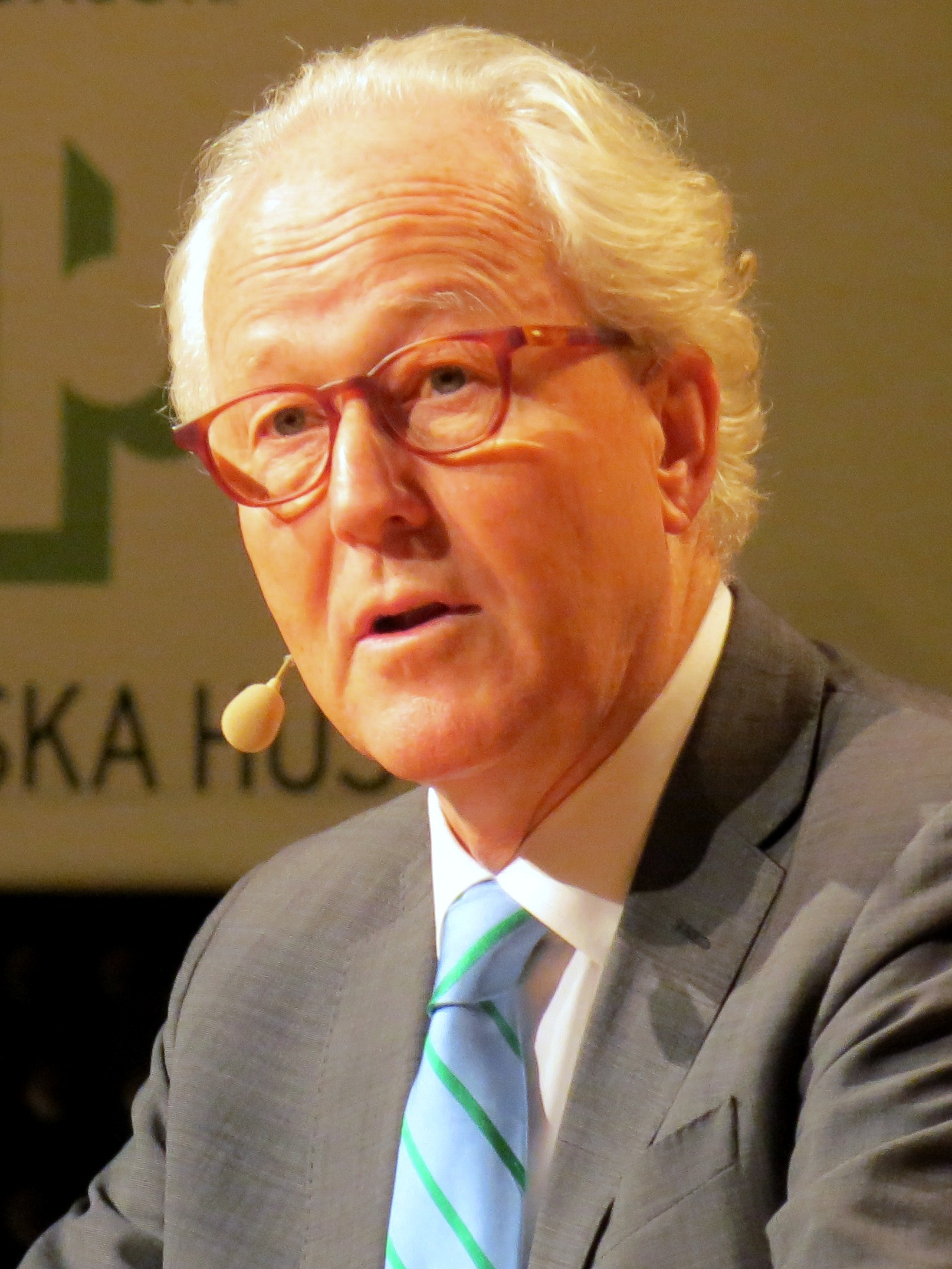

Governor of the Riksbank
- In office 2003–2005

Executive director of the Nobel Foundation
- In office 2010–2020

Personal details
- Born: 13 September 1950 (age 76)
- Education: Stockholm School of Economics
- Awards: H. M. The King's Medal; Order of the Rising Sun, 2nd Class, Gold and Silver Star

Lars Johan Heikensten (born 13 September 1950) is a former governor of Sveriges Riksbank (Sweden's central bank) and Doctor of Economics.

== Early life and career ==
Heikensten passed his higher school certificate in Bromma in 1970 and spent one year in High school in Marion, Iowa, in the United States, on an AFS International Scholarship. He graduated in economics in 1974 and completed his doctorate in economics in 1984 at the Stockholm School of Economics, where he also worked as a teacher and researcher on growth, labour market and development issues.

== Career ==
=== Early beginnings ===
In 1984 Heikensten was employed as a chief economist at the Swedish National Debt Office. From 1985 he was a director and later director-general and head of the Economic Affairs Department at the Ministry of Finance. During this time he was responsible, amongst other things, for government reports known as the Long-Term Surveys of the Swedish Economy. He became known to a wider public when he around 1990 argued for the need to reform the public expenditure system. Between 1992 and 1995 Heikensten was chief economist at Handelsbanken and a member of the Executive Group for Handelsbanken's investment bank, Capital Markets.

=== Central Bank of Sweden ===
In the autumn of 1995 Heikensten became Deputy Governor of Sveriges Riksbank with particular responsibility for monetary policy. He retained this position after the reform where the Riksbank became independent and an executive board was set up in 1999. He succeeded Urban Bäckström as Governor of the Riksbank in 2003. During the ten years when Heikensten worked at the Riksbank – from 1995 to 2005 – major changes occurred: the inflation target policy was established and interest rates fell significantly (the repo rate was decreased from 8.91 to 1.5 per cent). At the same time the Riksbank became one of the most transparent central banks in the world. Also, the workforce was drastically reduced (from over 900 to around 400 staff).

=== European Court of Auditors ===
Heikensten left in 2006 to become the Swedish Member of the European Court of Auditors, the external auditing organisation of the European Union located in Luxembourg. During his first years he worked with the court's communication, trying to contribute to a more open institution. He was also involved in projects to modernize and make the court more efficient. Publicly he advocated structured changes among them reducing substantially the number of members (now one from each country). During his last years Heikensten audited the external policies (incl. aid) of the European Union.

=== Nobel Foundation ===
Heikensten was appointed executive director of the Nobel Foundation in 2010, a position he held until the end of 2020. During this period the economic position of the foundation was strengthened as a consequence of healthy growth in capital and a strict spending policy. The relation between cost and capital was at the end of 2020 the best for at least the last 50 years. The outreach activities connected with the Nobel Prize developed rapidly during the period and revenues had more than doubled when the COVID-19 pandemic broke out in early 2020. In parallel, the Nobel Foundation worked with a Nobel Center, "a home for the Nobel Prize", with exhibitions, school activities and a broad public program. Originally, the center was planned to be built at Blasieholmen in the center of Stockholm, but the City of Stockholm in 2018 changed position and cancelled the project. A new concept for the Nobel Center along the water at Slussen has now been developed. If the project is realized the Nobel Center can be opened 2028. During his time at the Nobel Foundation Heikensten also had to deal with an acute crisis in the Swedish Academy in 2018–2019.

== Other activities ==
Heikensten has held many international positions, such as being a member of the EU Monetary Committee, the General Council of the European Central Bank (ECB) and the board of directors of the Bank of International Settlements (BIS), as well as Swedish Governor at the International Monetary Fund. He has also held many board positions in companies, university departments, "think-tanks" and government agencies. Besides, he has written several books, numerous articles in professional journals and participated actively in the Swedish and European economic policy debate.

Other activities include:

- Trygg-Stiftelsen, chair of the Board
- Kommuninvest, Member of the Board
- Save the Children, Member of the Board

== Recognition ==
Heikensten has been a member of the Royal Swedish Academy of Engineering Sciences since 2001, and the Royal Academy of Sciences since 2012. He became an Honorary Doctor of Economics at Umeå School of Business in 2005 and Honorary Doctor at Gustavus Adolphus College in 2012. He has been awarded the H. M. The King's Medal at the highest level.

=== Honours ===
- Order of the Rising Sun, 2nd Class, Gold and Silver Star (2022)

Government offices
Preceded by Urban Bäckström	Governor of the Swedish National Bank; 2003–2005	Succeeded by Stefan Ingves
