= Association of Swedish Engineering Industries =

Organization of Sweden

Technology Industries of Sweden
- Teknikföretagen
- Formation: 1896
- Legal status: Trade Organization
- Purpose: Employers' Organization
- Location: Stockholm, Sweden
- Director-General: Pia Sandvik
- Affiliations: CEEMET, Orgalime
- Website: teknikforetagen.se

The Technology Industries of Sweden (Swedish: Teknikföretagen) is a Swedish trade organization representing employers of multinational engineering and industrial manufacturing companies. The member companies operate in a range of sectors that include telecommunications, fabricated metal products, electronics, machinery and equipment, office machinery and apparatus, power industry, instrument technology, optics, motor cars and transport equipments. The association's main objective is to assist the employers of its member companies with various industry policies and labor law guidelines, collective agreement negotiations with labor unions as well as regular publication of economic policy and trend analysis reports. The association also maintains an established task force to promote initiatives in technological innovation, research collaboration between universities and companies as well as design thinking that ultimately can enhance the global competitiveness of Sweden's industrial sector. The association has 4,500 member companies with over 300,000 employees.

== History ==
In July 1896, as a result of the rapid industrial clustering and labor unionization, an industrial worker association (Swedish: Sveriges Verkstadsförening) was founded in Gothenburg, the home of world headquarters for several Swedish multinational engineering companies including, Electrolux, Saab Group, Volvo Group as well as SKF. The purpose of Verkstadsförening was to promote healthy employer-employee relations through collaboration with labor unions and to design bilateral employment agreements providing equal and yet competitive employment conditions to manufacturing employees.

Verkstadsförening subsequently expanded through several regional organizations across the country, which by 1917 together became members of the Swedish Employer's Association (Swedish: Svenska Arbetsgivareföreningen (SAF)). The pivotal change however took place in 1992 when the Workshop Association merged with the Mechanic Federation (Swedish: Mekanförbundet), yet another employer's interest organization for select sectors of the ever industrializing manufacturing sector in Sweden. The combined organizations were then named The Association of Swedish Workshop Industries (Swedish: Föreningen Sveriges Verkstadsindustrier (VI)), which in 2002 was renamed to the current Association of Swedish Engineering Industries.

== The Grand Award of Design ==
Since 2003, the association has hosted an annual challenge named The Grand Award of Design (Swedish: Stora Designpriset) to cultivate and promote domestic industrial design and design thinking for product and service development. The key objective is to nurture and inspire design work of viable commercial and competitive value for the Swedish manufacturing companies. Each year a shortlist of finalist companies are nominated for The Grand Design Prize and awarded with grants.

== Affiliations ==
At a national level, the association is a member of the Confederation of Swedish Enterprise (Swedish: Svenskt Näringsliv). At a regional level, the association is a member of the European Engineering Association named Orgalime where collaborative partnerships have been formed at an EU-level R&D workgroups to increase cross-border collaboration in technology innovation in the manufacturing sector.
