= Sven-Erik Österberg =

Swedish official and former social-democratic politician

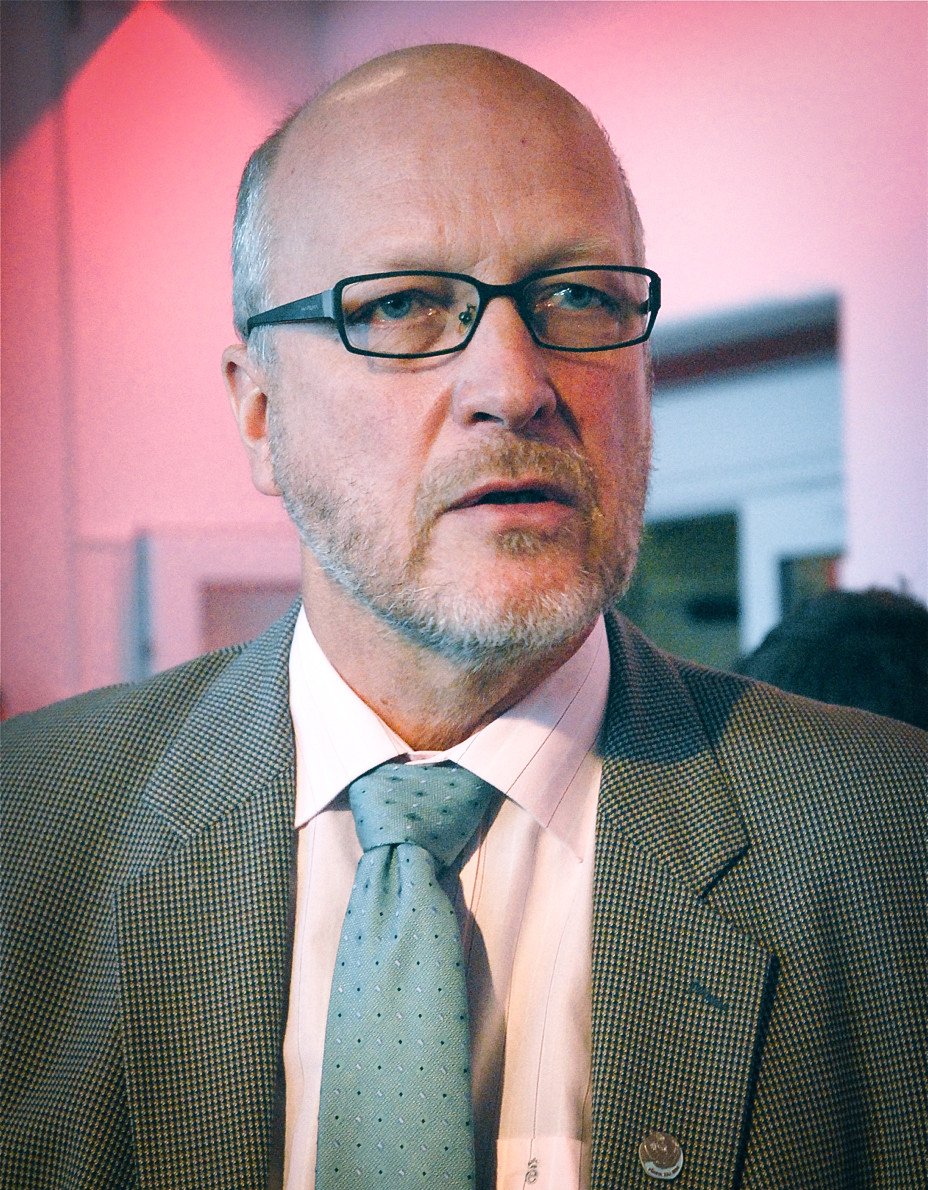
- Österberg in January 2012

Governor of Stockholm County
- In office 1 February 2018 – 28 February 2023
- Appointed by: Cabinet of Löfven
- Preceded by: Chris Heister
- Succeeded by: Anna Kinberg Batra

Governor of Norrbotten County
- In office 1 October 2012 – 31 January 2018
- Appointed by: Cabinet of Reinfeldt
- Preceded by: Per-Ola Eriksson
- Succeeded by: Björn O. Nilsson

Minister for Financial Markets
- In office 21 October 2004 – 6 October 2006
- Prime Minister: Göran Persson
- Preceded by: Gunnar Lund
- Succeeded by: Mats Odell

Personal details
- Born: 10 March 1955 (age 71) Munktorp, Sweden
- Party: Social Democrats
- Occupation: Ombudsman

Sven-Erik Österberg (born 10 March 1955 in Munktorp, Västmanland, Sweden) is a Swedish official and former social-democratic politician. He is the former Governor of Stockholm County from 1 February 2018 to 28 February 2023 and previously served as Governor of Norrbotten County from 1 October 2012 to 31 January 2018. Österberg was Minister for Financial Markets from 2004 to 2006.

== Biography ==
During ten years he worked first as a farm worker and then as a forest worker for the then state-owned commercial agency Domänverket in Skinnskatteberg's territory, in 1984 Österberg became local ombudsman for the Swedish Forest and Wood Workers' Union in Fagersta. At the same time, he also seemed like leisure politicians in Skinnskatteberg's Municipality with assignments as a city council and chairman of the Social Committee 1988-1991.

In 1991, he became municipal commissioner in Skinnskatteberg Municipality. In 1994, he became a member of the Parliament of Sweden. In the Riksdag, he has mainly worked with financial and labor market issues. He sat in the Committee on Finance as deputy 1996-1998, member 1998-2000. 2004 to 2006, he was Deputy Minister of Finance in the Cabinet of Göran Persson, with responsibility for municipal and financial market issues. After the Social Democrat's defeat in the 2006 election, Österberg returned to being a member of parliament. He has also been deputy in the Committee on Environment and Agriculture, Committee on Taxation and Committee on European Union Affairs, member of the Foreign Board and the War Delegation and was the chairman of the Riksdag's Nomination Committee. From 2008 to 2011, he functioned as the group leader of the Social Democratic group in parliament. From 2011 to 2012, he was a member of the Committee on the Constitution.

Within the party, Österberg has been the district chairman of the Västmanland County party district since 1995.

On 5 July 2012 Österberg was appointed governor in Norrbotten County.

On 9 November 2017 the Swedish government appointed Sven-Erik Österberg as new governor and head of the County Administrative Board in Stockholm County. He will take office on 1 February 2018. The appointment is for four years and expires on 28 February 2022.

Sven-Erik Österberg succeeds Chris Heister, whose appointment expired on 31 August 2017, after the government on 14 October withdrew the former appointment of Thomas Bodström as governor in Stockholm County.

Österberg is married and has three children.
