= Ulf Dinkelspiel =

Swedish politician (1939–2017)

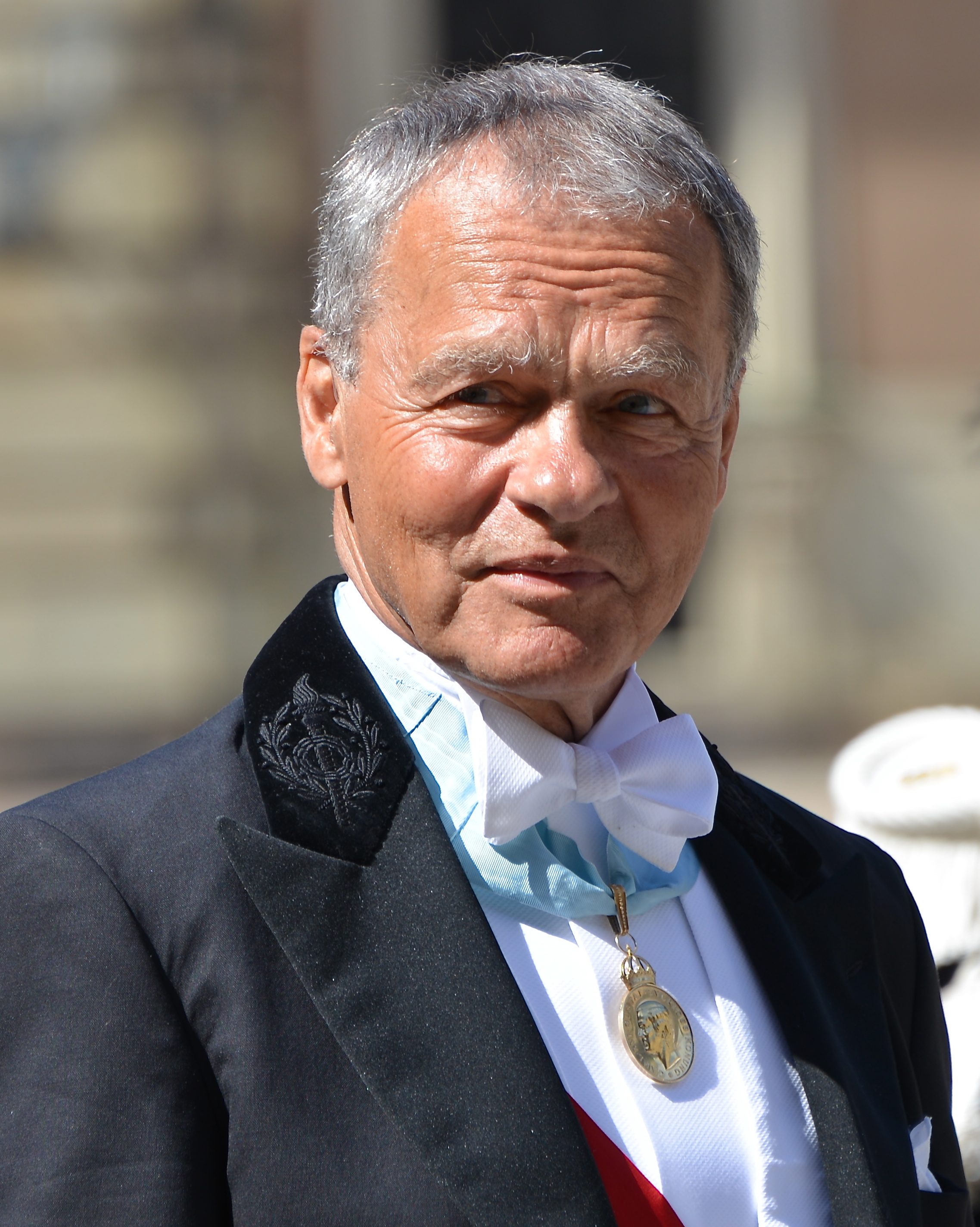
- Dinkelspiel in June 2013

Minister for Foreign Trade
- In office 4 October 1991 – 7 October 1994
- Monarch: Carl XVI Gustaf
- Prime Minister: Carl Bildt
- Preceded by: Anita Gradin
- Succeeded by: Mats Hellström

Minister for EU Affairs
- In office 4 October 1991 – 7 October 1994
- Monarch: Carl XVI Gustaf
- Prime Minister: Carl Bildt
- Succeeded by: Mats Hellström

Personal details
- Born: Ulf Adolf Roger Dinkelspiel; 4 July 1939 Stockholm, Sweden
- Died: 9 January 2017 (aged 77)
- Spouse: Louise Ramel (m. 1969)
- Education: Stockholm School of Economics

Ulf Adolf Roger Dinkelspiel (4 July 1939 – 9 January 2017) was a Swedish Moderate Party politician and financier.

== Early life ==
Dinkelspiel was born on 4 July 1939 in Stockholm in 1939, the son of Max Dinkelspiel and his wife Brita (née Björnstjerna). He attended the University of Arkansas in the United States from 1956 to 1957 and graduated from the Stockholm School of Economics in 1960. Dinkelspiel became a reserve officer in 1961.

== Career ==
Dinkelspiel worked at Bankirfirman E. Öhman J:or. AB from 1957 to 1959 and from 1961 to 1962. He was an employee at Stockholms Enskilda Bank in 1960 and became an attaché at the Ministry for Foreign Affairs in 1962. Dinkelspiel served at the Swedish Embassy in Tokyo from 1963 to 1965, at the OECD delegation in Paris from 1965 to 1967 and at the Foreign Ministry in Stockholm from 1967 to 1975.

Dinkelspiel served at the Swedish Embassy in Washington, D.C. from 1975 to 1979 and was state secretary at the Ministry of Commerce and Industry from 1979 to 1981 and deputy state secretary for foreign affairs from 1981 to 1982. He was then ambassador at the Foreign Ministry in Stockholm in 1982 and chief negotiator in EC affairs from 1988 to 1991. Dinkelspiel served from 1991 to 1994 as European Affairs and Foreign Trade Minister in the Carl Bildt cabinet. He became CEO of the Swedish Trade Council in 1995.

Dinkelspiel was a central figure in the negotiations for Swedish EU membership and was known as an advocate for European integration. From the campaign for Sweden joining the Euro, he served as chairman of the organization Sweden in Europe.

== Personal life and death ==
In 1969, Dinkelspiel married Louise Ramel (born 1948), the daughter of Baron Sten Ramel and his wife Baroness Margareta (née Moltke-Huitfeldt). His son, Jan, appeared on the Swedish reality television program Expedition Robinson 2001, finishing second place.

== Death ==
Dinkelspiel died from cancer on 9 January 2017 in Stockholm at the age of 77.

== Awards and decorations ==
- (Sweden) H. M. The King's Medal, 12th size gold (silver-gilt) medal worn around the neck on the Order of the Seraphim ribbon (1999)
- (Portugal) Grand Officer of the Order of Prince Henry (15 May 1991)

== Bibliography ==
- Dinkelspiel, Ulf; Stjernswärd, Lykke (2012). Trångsunds gård 1762-2012: 250 år (in Swedish). Huddinge: Ulf Dinkelspiel. SELIBR 13924332.
- Dinkelspiel, Ulf (2009). Den motvillige europén: Sveriges väg till Europa [The Reluctant European: Sweden's Road to Europe] (in Swedish). Stockholm: Atlantis. ISBN 978-91-7353-324-9. SELIBR 11304145.
- Dinkelspiel, Ulf; Briggert, Magnus, eds. (1992). Marknadsplats Norden år 2002 (in Swedish). Stockholm: Dagligvaruleverantörers förb. (DLF). SELIBR 1549478.
- Dinkelspiel, Ulf (1985). Skuldkris och skuldförhandlingar [Debt crisis and debt negotiations]. UD informerar, 0347-5298; 1985:5 (in Swedish). Stockholm: Utrikesdep. SELIBR 512521.

Civic offices
| Preceded by Margareta Hegardt | Deputy State Secretary for Foreign Affairs; 1981–1982 | Succeeded by None |
Government offices
| Preceded by Anita Gradin | Minister for Foreign Trade; 1991–1994 | Succeeded by Mats Hellström |
| Preceded by None | Minister for EU Affairs; 1991–1994 | Succeeded by Mats Hellström |
