= Urban Bäckström =

Swedish economist (born 1954)

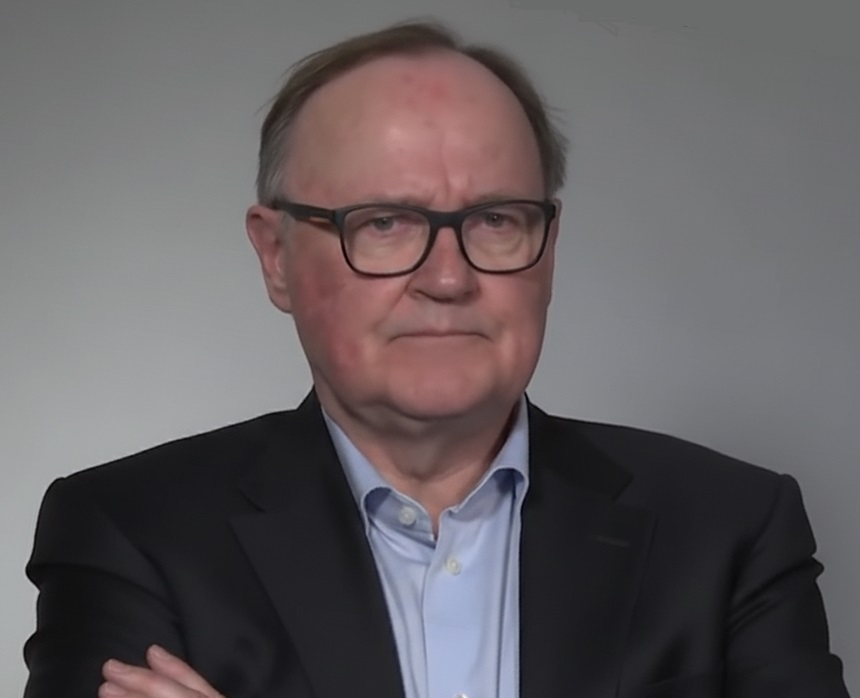

CEO of the Confederation of Swedish Enterprise
- In office 2005–2014

Governor of the Bank of Sweden
- In office 1994–2002

Personal details
- Born: Åke Per Urban Bäckström; 25 May 1954 Sollefteå, Sweden
- Occupation: Economist

Åke Per Urban Bäckström (born 25 May 1954 in Sollefteå, Västernorrlands län) is a Swedish economist who was CEO of the Confederation of Swedish Enterprise from 2005 to 2014 and governor of the Bank of Sweden from 1994 to 2002.

== Personal life ==
Bäckström grew up in Visby and Helsingborg and graduated with a degree in economics from Stockholm University. He is married to Ewa, who works for SAS. The couple has two children.

== Career ==
Urban Bäckström started his career at the Ministry of Finance during the Thorbjörn Fälldin government. He was later the chief economist for the centre-right Moderate Party. While state secretary at the Ministry of Finance he was involved among other things in the management of Sweden's financial crisis of the early 1990s. In 1994 he was appointed governor of the Bank of Sweden. After the 1997 Asian financial crisis, Bäckström worked to restabilize the krona, which had begun to be affected by the worldwide crisis during the second quarter of 1998. As one of his duties as governor, he served on the board of directors of the Bank for International Settlements.

Having resigned in 2002, he was appointed CEO of Skandia Liv, part of the Skandia group of insurance companies. In 2005 he became CEO of the Confederation of Swedish Enterprise, which represents larger companies and employers.

He has been a member of the Royal Swedish Academy of Engineering Sciences since 2003.

Government offices
Preceded by Bengt Dennis	Governor of the Swedish National Bank; 1994–2002	Succeeded by Lars Heikensten
Other offices
Preceded by Ebba Lindsö	Director-General of the Confederation of Swedish Enterprise; 2005–2014	Succeeded by Carola Lemne
