= Stiftelsen Sverige i Europa =

Swedish pro-european organisation

Stiftelsen Sverige i Europa ("Sweden in Europe") was the main campaign organisation on the yes side in the 2003 referendum on the euro. Sweden in Europe involved all political groups supporting the euro, including Social Democrats, in the campaign and published leaflets arguing for the euro from a left-wing point of view. Most of its funding came from the business organisation the Confederation of Swedish Enterprise.

Ulf Dinkelspiel, its chairman, was a Moderate Minister in the government of Carl Bildt between 1991 and 1994 and during the campaign former Moderate Youth League chairman Thomas Idergaard was its Chief Executive.

It has recently been restarted to activate supporters of further European integration.
