= Sveriges Riksbank =

Central bank of Sweden

Coordinates: 59°19′54″N 18°03′56″E

Sveriges Riksbank Sveriges riksbank

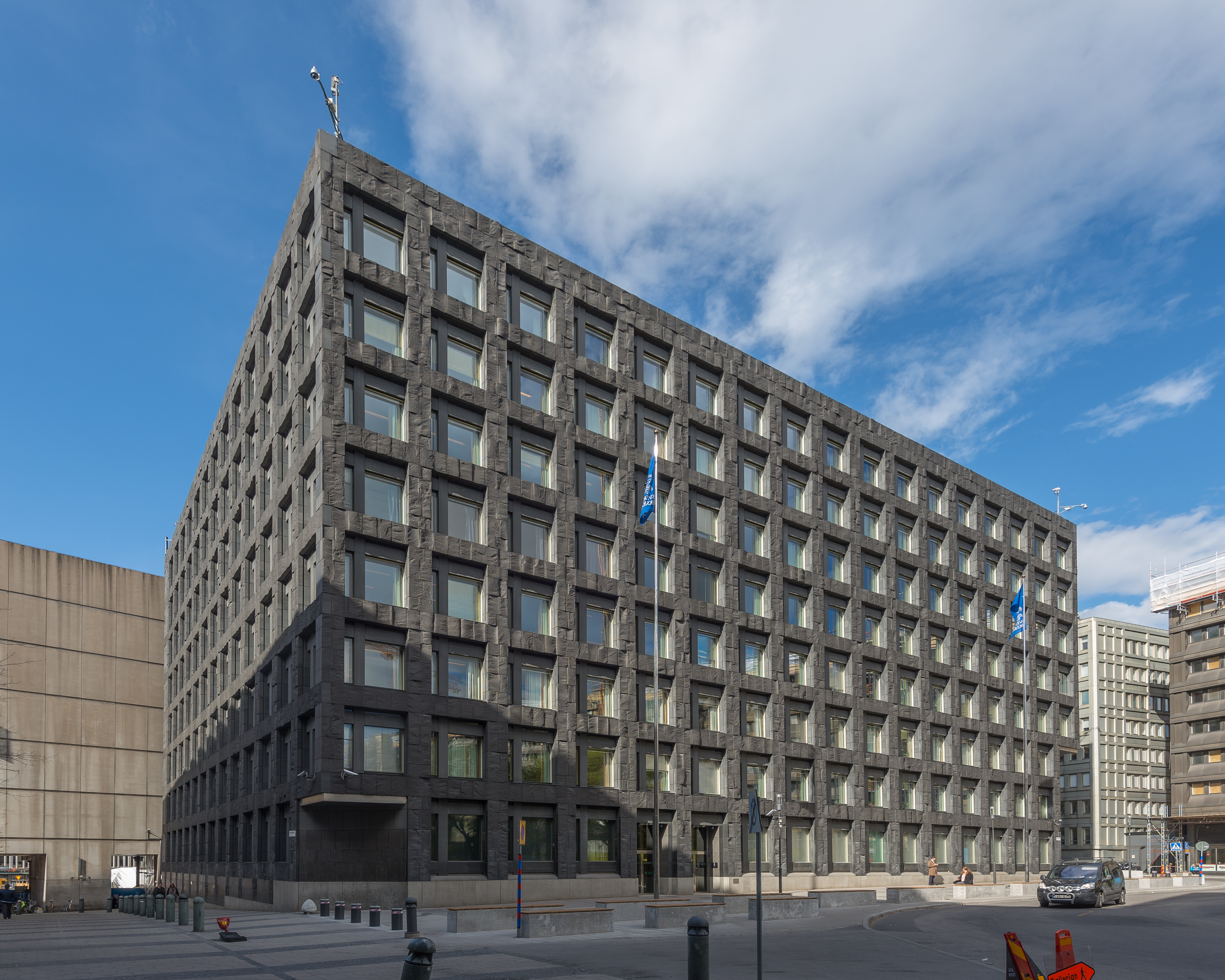
- Head office building (since 1976)
- Central bank of: Sweden
- Headquarters: Brunkebergstorg 11; 103 37 Stockholm; Sweden
- Established: 17 September 1668; 358 years ago
- Ownership: 100% state ownership
- Governor: Erik Thedéen
- Currency: Swedish krona SEK (ISO 4217)
- Reserves: 49 830 million USD
- Reserve requirements: None
- Bank rate: 2.35%
- Interest on reserves: 2.15%
- Interest paid on excess reserves?: not applicable (no reserve requirements)
- Preceded by: Riksens Ständers Bank (1668); Stockholms Banco (1657)
- Website: www.riksbank.se/en-gb/

Sveriges Riksbank, or simply the Riksbank, is the central bank of Sweden. Established in 1668 by the Riksdag, it is the world's oldest surviving central bank, and the third oldest bank in continuous operation.

Prior to World War I, it was also the only state-owned central bank outside of the Russian Empire.

It is also a member of the European Systemic Risk Board (ESRB).

== Etymology ==
The first part of the word riksbank, riks, stems from the Swedish word rike, which means realm, kingdom, empire or nation in English. A literal English translation of the bank's name could thus be Sweden's Realm's Bank. The bank, however, does not translate its name to English but rather uses its Swedish name the Riksbank in its official English-language communications.

== History ==
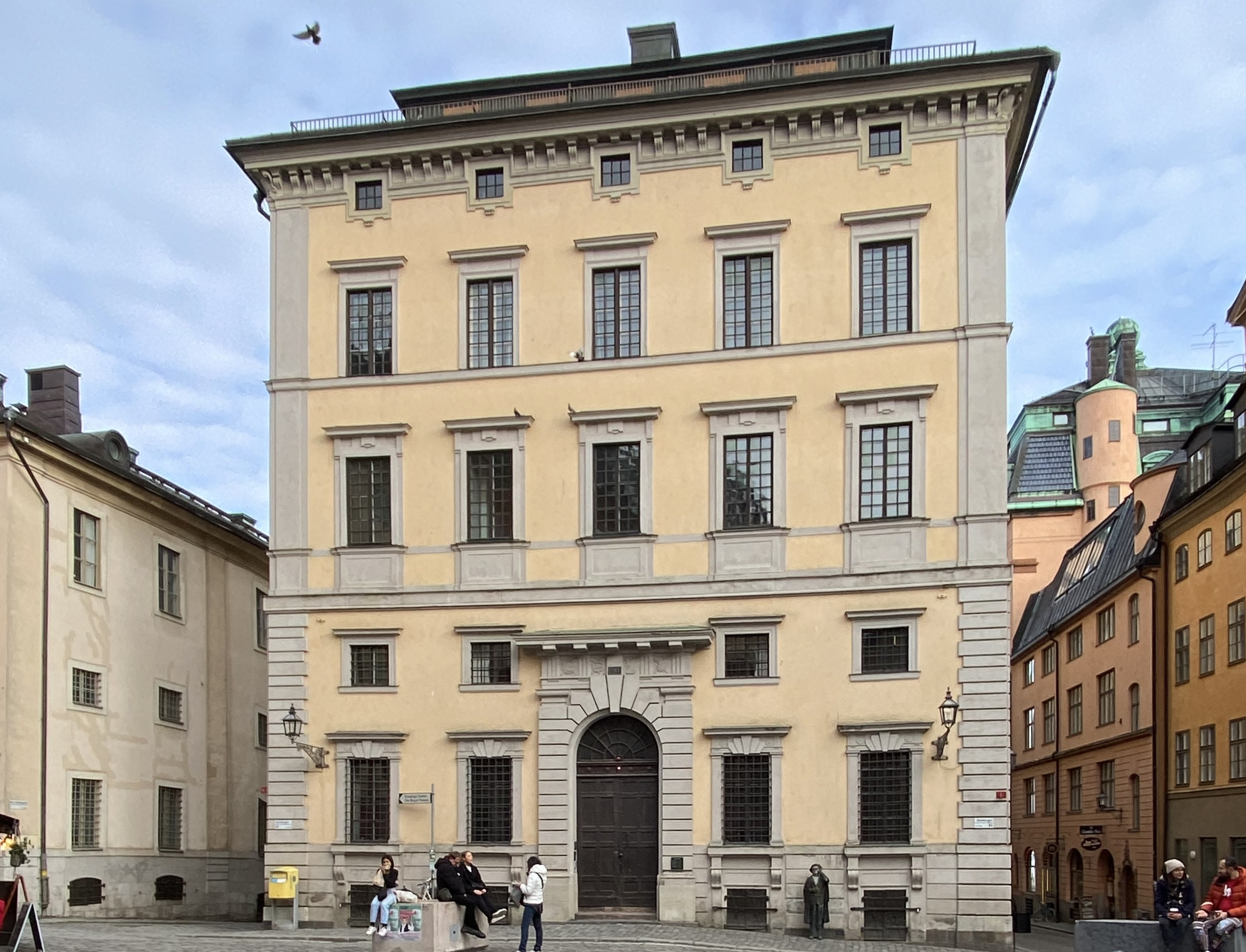
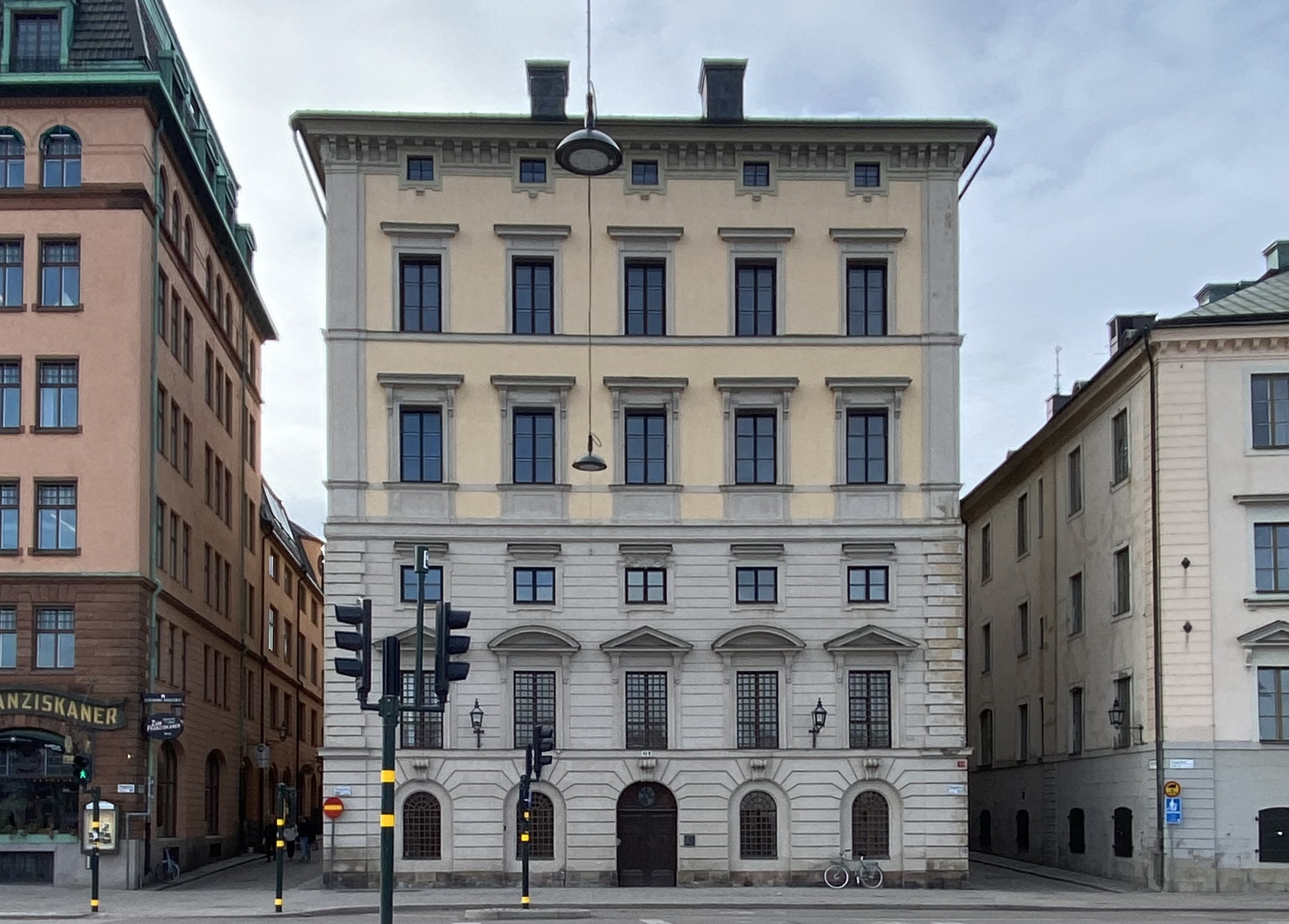
Södra Bankohuset, head office of the bank until 1905, respective façades on Järntorget (West, 1680) and Skeppsbron (East, 1730s)

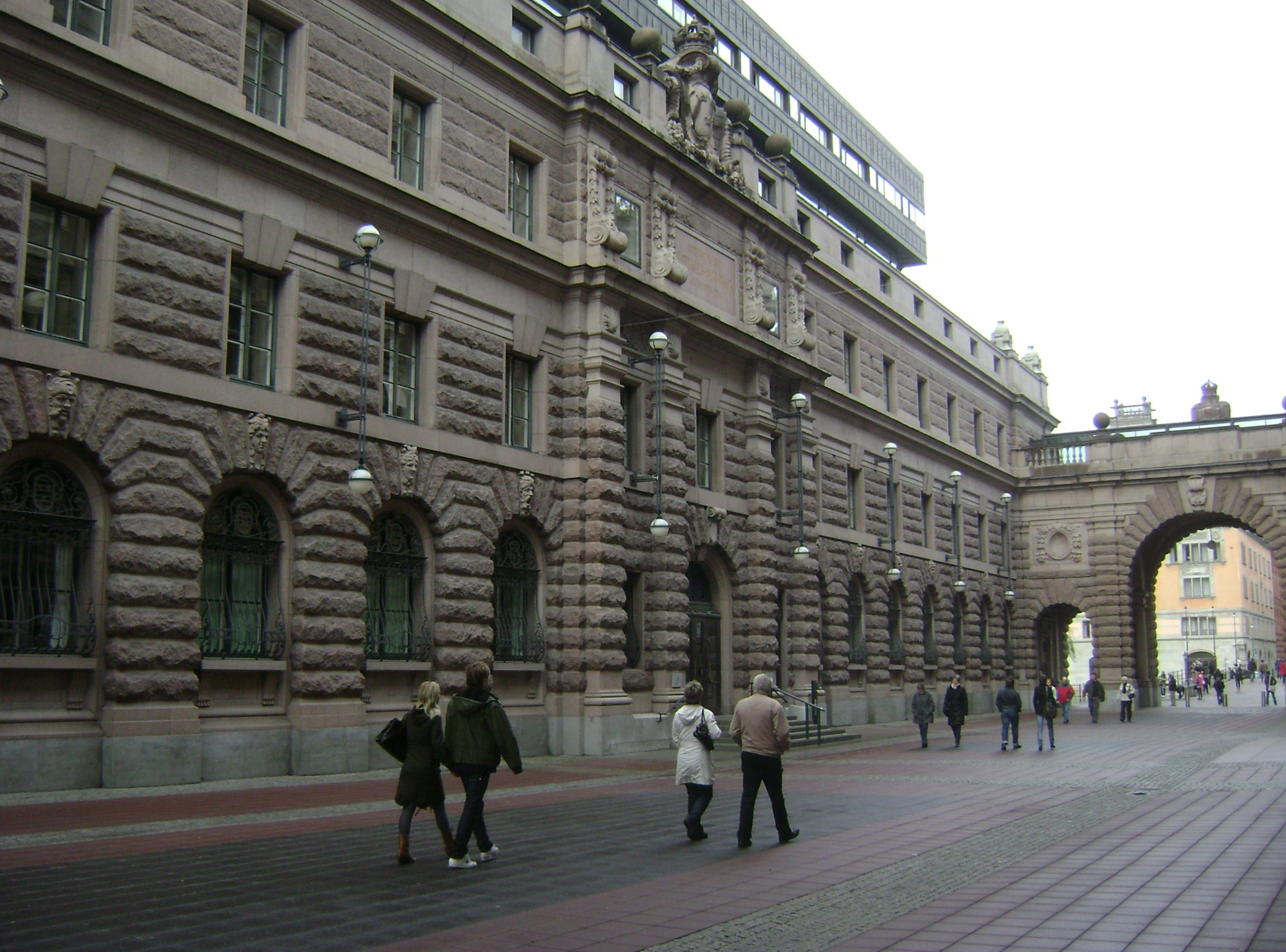
Building on the western side of Riksgatan in Stockholm, Riksbank head office from 1905 to 1976

The Riksbank began operations in 1668. Previously, Sweden was served by the Stockholms Banco (also known as the Bank of Palmstruch), founded by Johan Palmstruch in 1656. Although the bank was private, it was the king who chose its management: in a letter to Palmstruch, he gave permission to its operations according to stated regulations. But Stockholms Banco collapsed as a result of the issuing of too many notes without the necessary collateral. Palmstruch, who was considered responsible for the bank's losses, was condemned to death, but later received clemency. On 17 September 1668, the privilege of Palmstruch to operate a bank was transferred to the Riksens Ständers Bank (lit. 'Bank of the Estates of the Realm') and was run under the auspices of the parliament of the day. Due to the failure of Stockholm Banco, the new bank was managed under the direct control of the Riksdag of the Estates to prevent the interference from the king. When a new Riksdag was instituted in 1866, the name of the bank was changed to Sveriges Riksbank.

Having learned the lesson of the Stockholms Banco experience, the Riksbank was not permitted to issue bank-notes. Nevertheless, in 1701, permission was granted to issue so called "credit-notes". Some time in the middle of the 18th century, counterfeit notes began appearing, which caused serious problems. To prevent forgeries, it was decided that the Riksbank should produce its own paper for bank-notes and a paper-mill, Tumba Bruk, was founded in Tumba, on the outskirts of Stockholm.

A few years later, the first commercial banks were founded and these were also allowed to issue bank-notes. The bank-notes represented a claim to the bank without interest paid, and thus became a considerable source of income for banks. Nonetheless, security in the form of a deposit at the Riksbank was required to cover the value of all notes issued.

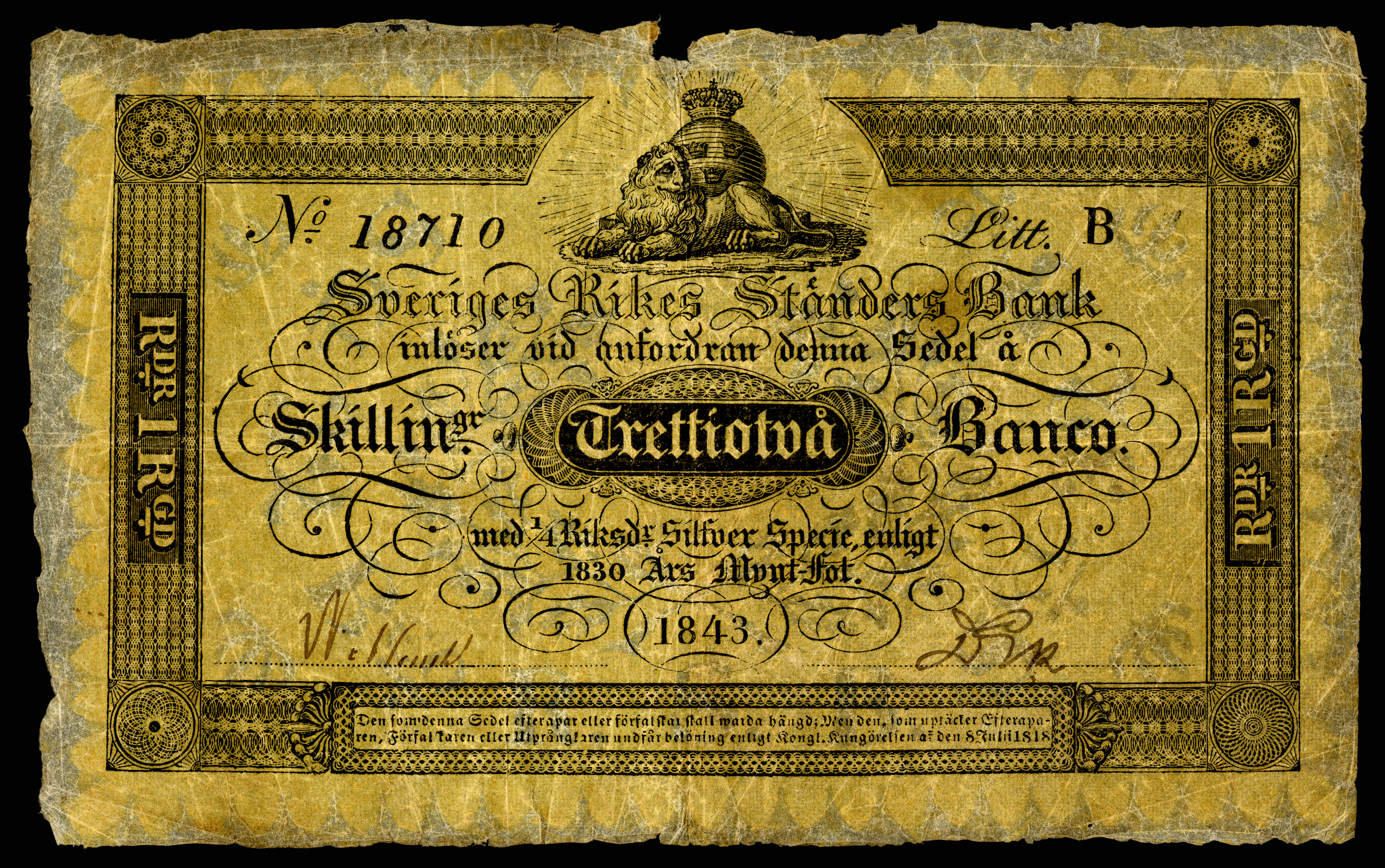
A mid-19th century banknote for 32 Skillingar Banco (1843)

During the 19th century, the Riksbank maintained a dominant position as a credit institution and issuer of bank-notes. The bank also managed national trade transactions as well as continuing to provide credit to the general public. The first branch-office was opened in 1824, later followed with subsidiary branches opening in each county (län). The present operational activities as a central bank differ from those during the 19th century. For example, no interest-rate-related activities were conducted.

The position of the Riksbank as a central bank dates back to 1897, when the first Riksbank Act was accepted concurrently with a law giving the Riksbank the exclusive right to issue bank-notes. This copyright concluded its role and importance regarding monetary policy in a modern sense, as the exclusive right to issue notes is a condition when conducting monetary policy and defending the value of a currency. Behind the decision were repeated demands that the private banks should cease to issue notes as it was considered that the ensuing profits should befall the general public.

The Swedish currency was backed by gold and the paper-certificates could be exchanged for gold coins until 1931, when a specialized temporary law freed the bank from this obligation. This law was renewed every year until the new constitution was ratified in 1975 which split the bank from the government into a stand-alone organization not obligated to exchange notes for gold.

In November 1992, the fixed exchange rate regime of the Swedish Krona collapsed. A few months later, in January 1993, the Governing Board of the Riksbank developed a new monetary policy regime based on a floating exchange rate and an inflation target. These policies were extensively influenced by assistance from the Bank of Canada, which had extensive previous experience controlling inflation, while being a similar small open economy, heavily subject to foreign exchange rate swings.

From 1991 to 1993, Sweden experienced its most severe recession since the 1930s termed the "Swedish banking rescue". It forced inflation down to around 2%, and inflation continued to be low during the subsequent years of strong growth in the late 1990s.

During the 2000s, the operations and administrative departments were downsized on behalf of the policy departments Financial Stability Department and Monetary Policy Department. A direct consequence of the changing times was that the Riksbank closed down all its branches in Sweden and outsourced the handling of coins and bills to a private company. Today the policy departments are the core of the central bank and they employ about half of the bank's 350 full-time posts.

== Motto ==
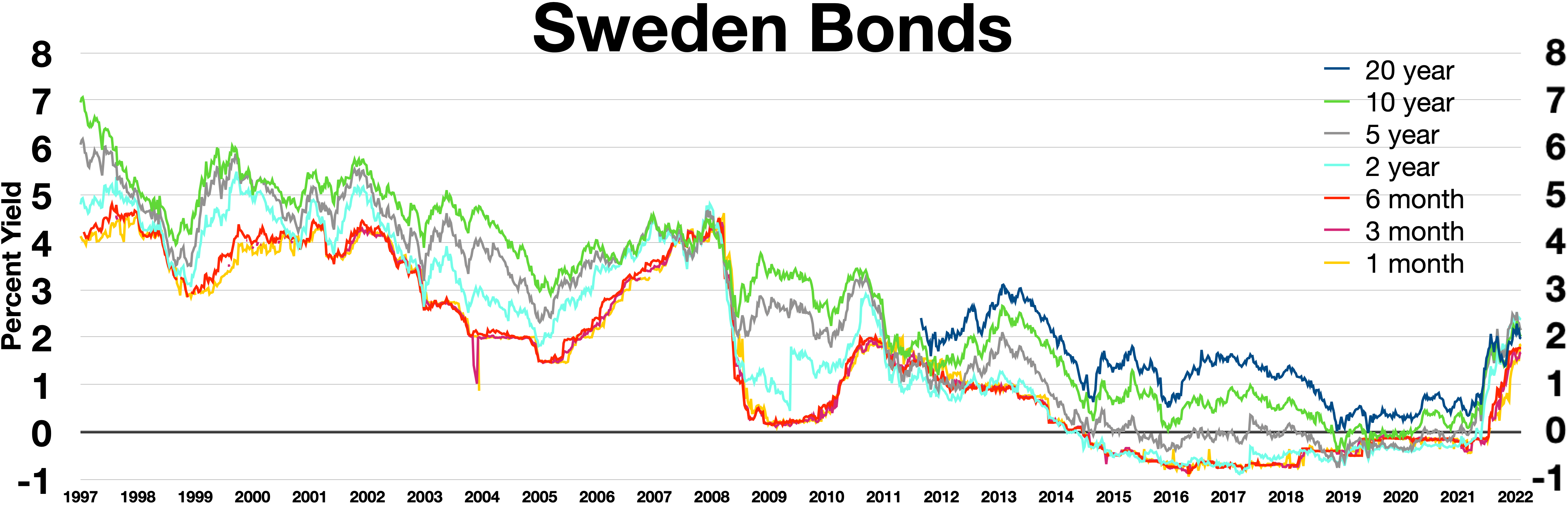
Sweden bonds 20 year 10 year 5 year 2 year 6 month 3 month 1 month

The motto of the Bank is Hinc robur et securitas, which is Latin for "Herefore strength and security" ("Härav styrka och säkerhet").

== Sveriges Riksbank Prize in Economic Sciences in Memory of Alfred Nobel ==
Following its third centennial in 1968, the bank instituted the annual Sveriges Riksbank Prize in Economic Sciences in Memory of Alfred Nobel, which is awarded with the Nobel Prizes at the Prize Award Ceremony in Stockholm, on 10 December, the anniversary of Alfred Nobel's death.

== Innovative monetary policy initiatives ==
The Riksbank has a reputation for innovation among central banks due to implementing policies such as:

=== Negative interest rates ===
On 2 July 2009, Sweden's Riksbank was the first central bank in the world to implement a negative interest rate, when it lowered its repo rate (the rate at which a central bank lends short-term money to commercial banks against securities) to 0.25%. This caused its linked overnight deposit rate (the interest commercial banks get for depositing money with the central bank overnight) to be pushed down to −0.25%, while the overnight lending rate (the interest a central bank charges commercial banks for overnight lending) was lowered to 0.75%. This was done to counter economic slowdown due to the 2008 financial crisis. The bank's Deputy Governor Lars E. O. Svensson stated that he had preferred a cut of the repo rate to 0.00%, as this would "entail a better balanced monetary policy, with lower unemployment and higher resource utilisation without inflation deviating too far from the target." The Swedish move to a negative discount rate was followed with great interest by central banks around the world.

On 28 October 2014, the Riksbank cut its repo rate to 0.00%, as Deputy Governor Svensson advocated in July 2009, pushing the linked deposit rate to −0.75%, while the lending rate remained at 0.75%.

On 12 February 2015, the bank again lowered the repo rate to −0.10%. The Riksbank announced at the same time that it would buy government bonds for SEK 30 billion, and that more measures would likely follow. The deposit rate was lowered to −0.85%, and the lending rate to 0.65%.

On 18 March 2015, the Riksbank cut the repo rate even further, to −0.25%. The bank announced at the same time that it was buying government bonds worth SEK 30 billion (US$3.4 billion, €3.2 billion) to prevent an appreciating krona from hindering an uptick in inflation. Inflation has been close to zero in Sweden since late 2012 and in February it was at 0.1%, far below the target of 2.0%, and the purpose of these moves was to stimulate inflation. The bank announced that it intends to keep the rate at −0.25%. "at least until the second half of 2016." The deposit rate was as a consequence lowered to −1.00% and the lending rate to 0.50%.

The Riksbank has consequently lowered the rate two additional times, first on 8 July 2015 down 0.10 percentage points to −0.35 and most recently, on 17 February 2016 it was down another 0.15 points to −0.50. The accompanying deposit and lending rates now lies at −1.25 and 0.25, respectively.

=== E-krona ===
Facing a natural drop in the use of cash by the Swedish population, the Riksbank is pioneering the idea of introducing a central bank digital currency, the e-krona. Such currency would have the same properties as cash, but in a digital form. In November 2016, the Bank announced an ambitious research programme in order to help the bank decide whether it should start issuing e-krona. The Bank released its first interim report in September 2017 which outlined that "no major obstacles to the introduction of an e-krona have been identified".

Following the announcement, scammers claiming to be selling Riksbank e-kronas have been targeting some consumers via telephone calls, even though as of the end of 2021, Riksbank had not yet decided whether it will issue an e-krona. By 2023, Riksbank had completed its technical pilot of the e-krona, though not concluding whether it will issue it or not, and decided to focus on monitoring the global development of digital currencies.

== Other Swedish banks ==
Nordea, Swedbank, Skandia, Länsförsäkringar, Danske Bank, Handelsbanken, SEB, Volvofinans Bank, Färs & Frosta Sparbank, Ikano Bank, HQ Bank, Carnegie Investment Bank, ICA Banken, Avanza, Resurs Bank.

=== First Deputies ===
- Karl Langenskiöld, 1901–1912
- Victor Moll, 1912–1929
- Ivar Rooth, 1929
- Kerstin af Jochnick, 2012–2019
- Cecilia Skingsley, 2019–2022
- Anna Breman, 2022–2025

=== Governors ===
- Ivar Rooth, 1929–1948
- Klas Böök, 1948–1951
- Mats Lemne, 1951–1955
- Per Åsbrink, 1955–1973
- Krister Wickman, 1973–1976
- Carl Henrik Nordlander, 1976–1979
- Lars Wohlin, 1979–1982
- Bengt Dennis, 1982–1993
- Urban Bäckström, 1993 – 31 December 2002
- Lars Heikensten, 1 January 2003 – 31 December 2005
- Stefan Ingves, 1 January 2006 – 31 December 2022
- Erik Thedéen, 1 January 2023–

== See also ==
- Economy of Sweden
- Monetary policy of Sweden
- Swedish krona
- Riksdaler
- Scandinavian Monetary Union
- Sweden and the euro
- Swedish National Debt Office
- Södra Bankohuset
- List of central banks
