= Confederation of Swedish Enterprise =

Trade group

- Svenskt Näringsliv
- Formation: 2001
- Legal status: Political organization
- Purpose: Employers' organization
- Location: Stockholm, Sweden
- President: Fredrik Persson
- Director-General: Jan-Olof Jacke
- Affiliations: BusinessEurope
- Budget: 1,000,000,000 SEK
- Website: svensktnaringsliv.se

The Confederation of Swedish Enterprise or Swedish Enterprise (Swedish: Svenskt Näringsliv) is a major employers' organization for private sector and business sector companies in Sweden. It has 49 member associations representing 60,000 member companies with more than 1.6 million employees.

== History ==
The current organisation is the result of a merger between the Swedish Employers Association (Swedish: Svenska Arbetsgivareföreningen, abbreviated SAF) and the Swedish National Federation of Industry (Swedish: Sveriges Industriförbund) that was completed in March 2001.

== Policy ==
Like its predecessors, the organisation is actively lobbying for pro-business interests. Tax cuts, especially the abolition of property and inheritance taxes, is a main priority. The organisation also promotes letting private enterprises take over the production of a larger part of services today mainly performed by the Swedish public sector, such as education and health services.

The Confederation of Swedish Enterprise finances Timbro — a liberal and economically liberal think tank — via the Swedish Free Enterprise Foundation (Swedish: Stiftelsen Fritt Näringsliv).

== Organisation ==
Approximately 200 employees work in the Stockholm main office, the 22 regional offices in Sweden and the EU Brussels office. The Confederation of Swedish Enterprise is a member federation of BusinessEurope, representing 41 member federations from 34 European nations. The organization alone covers 69 per cent of private sector workers in Sweden (2017). Together with other employers' associations, the organization cover about 82 per cent of all private sector workers.

=== Leadership ===
Director-Generals:
- Göran Tunhammar, 2001 – 2003
- Ebba Lindsö, 2003 – 2005
- Urban Bäckström, 2005 – 2014
- Carola Lemne, 2014 – 2018
- Jan-Olof Jacke, 2018 – present
Presidents:
- Sören Gyll, 2001 – 2004
- Michael Treschow, 2004 – 2007
- Signhild Arnegård Hansen, 2007 – 2010
- Kenneth Bengtsson, 2010 – 2013
- Jens Spendrup, 2013 – 2016
- Leif Östling, 2016 – 2017
- Fredrik Persson, 2017 – present

=== List of member organisations ===
The Confederation of Swedish Enterprise's members are employers' associations, trade associations or other groups of companies. Individual companies are members of the member organizations and thereby members of the Confederation of Swedish Enterprise.

- Almega (Official site) Umbrella organisation for a number of trade organisations in the Swedish service sector:
  - Competence Agencies of Sweden, or Kompetensföretagen (Official site)
  - Almega Service Associations, or Almega Tjänsteförbunden (Official site) Representing approximately 3,900 service companies.
  - Almega Swedish Federation of Consulting Engineers and Architects, or Almega Innovationsföretagen, (Official site)
  - Almega Service Employers Association, or Almega Tjänsteföretagen (Official site) Representing private schools, audit and consulting firms, travel agencies and tour operators, call centres, health- and wellness companies, companies in the tourist and entertainment sector, riding schools, real estate agents, bingo halls, bowling alleys, and more.
  - Association of Private Care Providers, Vårdföretagarna (Official site) Association for companies providing private care services in Sweden.
  - Media Industries Employers Association, or Medieföretagen (Official site) Represents newspapers and magazines, book publishing companies, radio and television broadcasters, cinemas, printing companies, public relations companies, newspaper distribution companies, film producers and distributors, record labels and video game companies.
  - Swedish IT & Telecom Industries, IT & Telekomföretagen (Official site) Member organization for companies of all sizes within the entire IT and telecom sector.
- Association of Swedish Earth Moving Contractors, or Maskinentreprenörerna (ME) (Official site) Trade- and employers' association for earth movers and contractors with construction equipment.
- BIL Sweden (Official site) Represents manufacturers and importers of cars, trucks and buses.
- Byggnadsämnesförbundet (BÄF) (Official site) Employers' organization for companies manufacturing products primarily for construction purposes, such as concrete and cement, gypsum, gravel, insulation, lime, ceramics, rubble, roofing materials, bricks, etc. and the glass container industry.
- Byggmaterialindustrierna (Official site) Association for Swedish construction materials companies.
- EnergiFöretagens Arbetsgivareförening (EFA) (Official site) Represents the electric power industry.
- Swedish Federation of Green Employers, or Gröna arbetsgivare (GA) (Official site) Organisation for agriculture, forestry and gardening companies, landscape contractors, golf clubs, and animal health companies.
- Försäkringsbranschens Arbetsgivareorganisation (FAO) (Official site) Represents 140 insurance companies in Sweden.
- Innovation and Chemical Industries in Sweden, or Innovations- och kemiindustrierna i Sverige (IKEM) (Official site) Industrial and employer organisation representing companies working in a broad cross-section of the chemical industry as producers, distributors and users.
- Läkemedelsindustriföreningen (LIF) (Official site) Trade association for the research-based pharmaceutical industry.
- Plåtslageriernas Riksförbund (PLR) (Official site) Organizing companies in the sheet metal work, ventilation, steel and light steel framing industry.
- Svensk Betong (Official site) Trade organization for cement companies.
- Swedish Aggregates Producers Association, or Sveriges Bergmaterialindustri (SBMI) (Official site) Industry organisation for the aggregate industry.
- Swedish Association of Industrial Employers, or Industriarbetsgivarna (Official site) An umbrella organisation providing service for:
  - Steel and Metal Employers Association, or Stål och Metall Arbetsgivareförbundet (Official site)
  - SVEMEK (Official site) Association for equipment rental companies, lock and security companies, metal fabrication and machine shops, and companies providing industrial services.
  - Swedish Association of Mines, Mineral and Metal Producers, or SveMin (Official site)
  - Swedish Forest Industries, or Skogsindustrierna (Official site) Trade and employers' organisation for the pulp, paper and woodworking industries.
- Swedish Association of Management Consultants (SAMC) (Official site) Represents management consulting firms.
- Swedish Association of Plumbing and HVAC Contractors, or VVS Företagen (Official site) Trade association and employers' organisation for the HVP sector.
- Swedish Construction Federation, or Sveriges Byggindustrier (BI) (Official site) Represents the interests of the construction industry in Sweden.
- Swedish Cosmetics, Detergents and Toiletries Association, or Kemisk-Tekniska Leverantörförbundet (KTF) (Official site) Trade association of companies that import, manufacture or market cosmetics and detergents.
- Swedish Electrical Contractor's Association, or Elektriska Installatörsorganisationen (EIO) (Official site) Trade and employers' organization for the electrical contractors and telecommunications technology companies.
- Swedish Food Federation, or Livsmedelsföretagen (Official site) Representing companies in the food industry.
- Swedish Graphic Companies' Federation, or Grafiska Företagens Förbund (Official site) Trade and employers' organisation for companies within the graphic and packaging industry, as well as other sectors associated with the graphic industry.
- Swedish hospitality industry, or Visita (Official site) Industry and employers' organization for the hospitality industry.
- Swedish Recycling Industries' Association, or Återvinningsindustrierna (Official site) Organisation of Swedish companies working within the recycling field.
- Swedish Shipowners' Association, or Sveriges Redareförening (Official site) Industry organization for the Swedish shipping industry.
- Swedish Steel Producers' Association, or Jernkontoret (Official site) Representative of companies in the Swedish steel industry.
- Swedish Textile and Clothing Industries' Association, or Sveriges Textil- och Modeföretag (TEKO) (Official site) Employers' organization for the Swedish textile and fashion companies.
- Swedish Trade Federation, or Svensk Handel (Official site) Employers’ organisation serving the entire trade and commerce sector.
- Teknikföretagen (Official site) Employers' organisation for engineering companies.
- TeknikGrossisternas Arbetsgivareförening (TGA) (Official site) Represents companies active in the wholesale business with a technical focus.
- Trä- och Möbelföretagen (TMF) (Official site) National trade and employers’ association of the wood processing and furniture industry.
- Transport Group of Sweden, or TransportGruppen (Official site). Umbrella organisation for associations and companies in the transportation sector in Sweden:
  - Association Ports of Sweden, or Sveriges Hamnar. Industry and employers' organisation representing almost all port companies in Sweden.
  - Employers' Association of the Swedish Petroleum Industry, or Petroleumbranschens Arbetsgivareförbund (PAF). Represents companies in the oil industry.
  - Swedish Aviation Industry Group, or Svenska FlygBranschen. Trade and Employers' Association for airlines, airport companies, air forwarding agents, catering and aircraft maintenance companies.
  - Swedish Bus and Coach Federation, or Sveriges Bussföretag. Represents private and municipal companies in the bus and coach industry.
  - Swedish International Freight Association, or Transportindustriförbundet. (SIFA) Trade association representing companies engaged in the movement of freight by air, road, rail and sea; including ports and terminals, warehousing and distribution, logistics and supply chain management.
  - Swedish Motor Trade Employers' Association, or Motorbranschens Arbetsgivareförbund (MAF). Represents companies providing car and tractor services, vehicle and industrial lacquering, tyre workshops, breakdown assistance, fuel, garage and garage/parking.
  - Swedish Shipowners' Employer Association, or Sjöfartens Arbetsgivareförbund (SARF). Representing shipowners and shipping companies.
  - Swedish Road Transport Employers' Association, or Biltrafikens Arbetsgivareförbund (BA). Represents companies providing logistics, terminals, dispatch, environment and waste management, driving schools, rental, forwarding, haulage contractors, couriers and taxi cabs.
- Plåt & Ventföretagen, (Official site)

== See also ==
- Non-governmental organisations in Sweden
- List of Swedish companies
- Economy of Sweden
- Sweden in Europe
