= Anna Kinberg Batra =

Swedish politician (born 1970)

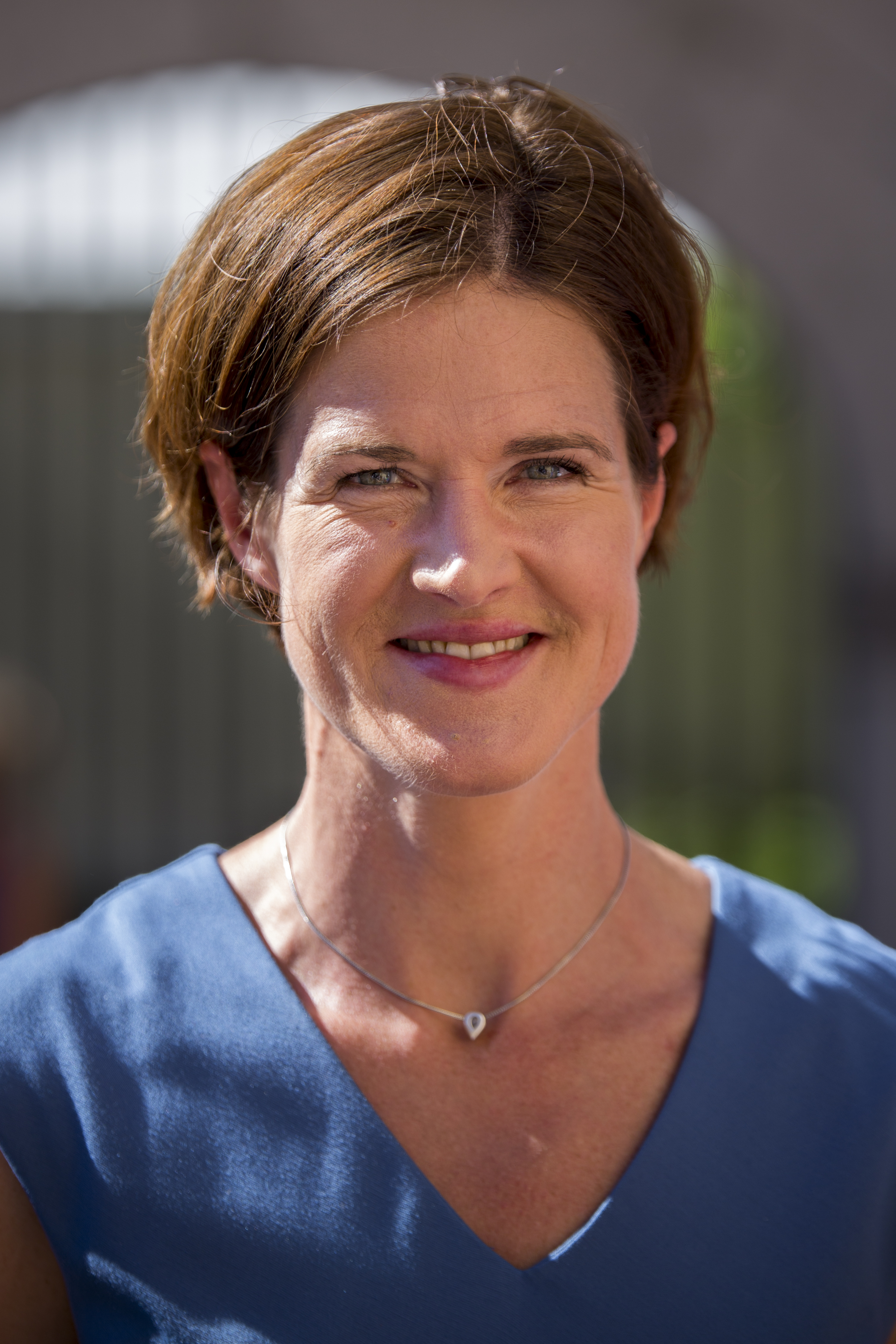
- Anna Kinberg Batra in 2015

Governor of Stockholm County
- In office 1 March 2023 – 3 October 2024
- Monarch: Carl XVI Gustaf
- Prime Minister: Ulf Kristersson
- Preceded by: Sven-Erik Österberg
- Succeeded by: Claes Lindgren (acting)

Leader of the Opposition
- In office 10 January 2015 – 1 October 2017
- Monarch: Carl XVI Gustaf
- Prime Minister: Stefan Löfven
- Preceded by: Fredrik Reinfeldt
- Succeeded by: Ulf Kristersson

Leader of the Moderate Party
- In office 10 January 2015 – 1 October 2017
- Deputy: Peter Danielsson
- Party Secretary: Tomas Tobé; Anders Edholm
- Preceded by: Fredrik Reinfeldt
- Succeeded by: Ulf Kristersson

Leader of the Moderate Party in the Riksdag
- In office 4 October 2010 – 14 January 2015
- Leader: Fredrik Reinfeldt
- Preceded by: Lars Lindblad
- Succeeded by: Jessica Polfjärd

Member of the Riksdag
- In office 17 September 2006 – 24 September 2018
- Constituency: Stockholm Municipality

Personal details
- Born: Anna Maria Kinberg; 14 April 1970 (age 56) Stockholm, Sweden
- Party: Moderate
- Spouse: David Batra (m. 2002)
- Children: 1
- Parent(s): Johan S. Kinberg; Sarah Kinberg (née Lundgren)
- Education: Stockholm University; Stockholm School of Economics

Anna Maria Kinberg Batra (Swedish: [ˈânːa ˈɕɪ̂nːbærj ˈbɑ̌ːtra]; née Kinberg; born 14 April 1970) is a Swedish politician who served as Leader of the Opposition and as Leader of the Moderate Party from 2015 to 2017. She was a Member of the Riksdag for Stockholm County from 2006 to 2018. She also served as parliamentary leader from 2010 to 2015.

On 25 August 2017, Kinberg Batra announced her resignation as party leader; she was succeeded by Ulf Kristersson on 1 October 2017. In September 2017, she said that she would leave the political arena.

She served as Governor of Stockholm County from 1 March 2023, following her appointment by the Government of Sweden on 2 February 2023, until 3 October 2024 when she was forced to resign after the Government rescinded its confidence in her on 27 September 2024.

== Early life ==
Anna Kinberg was born in Skärholmen. In 1974, Kinberg and her family moved to Rotterdam, Netherlands, as her father worked for Merrill Lynch's Amsterdam office. Kinberg Batra speaks fluent Dutch after her years in the country. They moved back to Sweden in 1980, settling in Djursholm where Kinberg Batra spent the rest of her upbringing.

=== Relatives ===
Kinberg Batra is a member of the Kinberg family from Västra Götaland County. Her parents are commodity analyst Johan S. Kinberg and chemistry engineer Sarah Kinberg (née Lundgren). Her grandfather was director Hilding Kinberg and her great-great-grandfather was professor Hjalmar Kinberg.

== Education ==
Kinberg Batra went to high school at Danderyds gymnasium, where she studied natural sciences. After high school, she studied foreign languages and political science at Stockholm University between 1989 and 1991. She graduated from Stockholm School of Economics in 2000, having studied part-time there from 1991.

== Political career ==
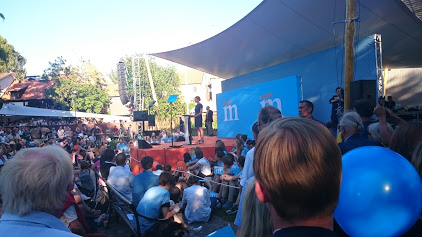
Anna Kinberg Batra speaks before a crowd at Almedalsveckan in Visby, July 2015.

Kinberg Batra joined the Moderate Youth League in 1983. During the internal fights within the youth league in the beginning of the 1990s, she belonged to the liberal phalanx and supported Ulf Kristersson as chairman.

In 1993, she worked as political advisor to Prime Minister Carl Bildt at the Government offices. She has also worked as editor at Svenska Dagbladet in 1994, and 1996. From 1995 to 1996, she was political secretary at the office of the Moderate Party in the European Parliament, and from 1998 to 2000, she served as project leader. From 2000 to 2005, she was communication consultant at Prime PR. Concurrently, she ran her own consulting business. From 2005 to 2006, she was head of information at the Stockholm Chamber of Commerce.

She was active in student politics as chairman of the Stockholm University Student Union in 1994, as a member of the board of the Moderate Youth League from 1995 to 1998, and as the first female chairman of the Moderate Youth League in Stockholm County from 1996 to 1998. From 2004 to 2011, she was a member of the board of activity center Fryshuset. Since 2011, she has been a member of the executive board of the Moderate Party.

=== Elected representative ===
She has also been an elected member of the Stockholm County Council and the municipal council in Nacka Municipality. Prior to the 2006 general election, she worked at the Stockholm Chamber of Commerce, and prior to that she worked in different companies as a public relations consultant. She has authored the book Indien – från stackare till stormakt ("India – From Wretch to Great Power", Timbro, 2005).

Kinberg Batra became known to the general public when she stated that "people from Stockholm are more intelligent than people from rural areas" in her 1998 election campaign. In 2014, she apologized for this statement and said that "it is still the stupidest thing I've said publicly".

In the Riksdag from 2006, she was chairman of the Committee on European Union Affairs from 2007 to 2010, and chairman of the Committee on Finance from 2010 to 2014.

=== Leader of the Moderate Party ===
Following the defeat of the Moderate Party in the general election in September 2014, Kinberg Batra took de facto leadership of the party. On 9 December 2014, the Moderate Party's nomination committee nominated Anna Kinberg Batra to succeed Fredrik Reinfeldt as party leader. She was elected to the position at the party congress on 10 January 2015, becoming the party's first female leader.

She faced criticism from voters and from within the Moderate Party after the December agreement, which made it possible for Prime Minister Stefan Löfven's centre-left minority government coalition to continue in office. On 9 October 2015, following the Christian Democrats' departure from the agreement, Kinberg Batra announced that the agreement was now dissolved.

On 25 August 2017, she announced that she would resign the leadership of the Moderate Party, owing to heavy criticism from within the party. She was succeeded by Ulf Kristersson on 1 October 2017.

=== Governor of Stockholm County ===
In 2023 she was appointed Governor of Stockholm County by the Kristersson Cabinet.

In March 2024, her decision to recruit two of her close friends to well compensated positions within the administration, without announcing the positions as open, sparked controversy. While Kinberg Batra defends the recruitment, stating that the candidates are the best suited candidates for the positions, the controversy led the Swedish Prosecution Authority's anti-corruption agency (Riksenheten mot korruption) to launch an investigation. Prime Minister Ulf Kristersson expressed support for the anti-corruption investigation.

In a separate corruption allegation, Kinberg Batra expensed her private lunches and dinners on the government.

Kinberg Batra also received criticism for increasing the budget threefold for the Tessin Palace, the Governors official residence. During 2023 she defended these claims stating that the king's visit during his golden jubilee required more money to be spent at the palace. This increase in budget however remained in 2024 when no such events were scheduled to take place fueling mass criticism.

In April 2024 Kinberg Batra fired the Chief Director of Stockholm County Åsa Ryding, the second highest-ranking official in the county behind the Governor. The fired chief director was given SEK 2.2 million in compensation, funded by taxpayer money. In August 2024 the National Audit Office in response to this launched an investigation into the incident to determine whether or not the Governor is empowered to fire high ranking county officials such as the chief director or if this power is held by the Government alone, and to decide if the compensation was justified.

On 26 September 2024 the Justice Ombudsman announced harsh criticism against Kinberg Batra for among other things the hiring of her two friends earlier in March, stating that the decision disregarded the Instrument of Governments requirement of objectivity in the hiring process. This because according to the Ombudsman Kinberg Batra had in two cases already decided the outcome of the hiring process and in another hired an individual lacking the academic qualifications for the job. The same day Kinberg Batra declared she would not be resigning. The next day, on 27 September 2024, Minister for Public Administration Erik Slottner announced that Prime Minister Ulf Kristersson and the Government had lost confidence in Kinberg Batra as Governor of Stockholm County, and that the Government would force her to tender her resignation. The Government formally took the decision to depose Kinberg Batra during a cabinet meeting on 3 October.

Simultaneously it was announced that Kinberg Batra would be moved to the Government Offices and work there until 2029, when her term as Governor was supposed to end. She announced in March 2026 that she had terminated her contract and would leave the government offices by the end of March that year.

== Personal life ==
She has been married to comedian David Batra since 2002. They have one daughter and live in Nacka, Stockholm. She is fluent in French and proficient in Dutch.

Party political offices
Preceded by Lars Lindblad	Leader of the Moderate Party in the Riksdag; 2010–2015	Succeeded by Jessica Polfjärd
Preceded by Fredrik Reinfeldt	Leader of the Moderate Party; 2015–2017	Succeeded by Ulf Kristersson
