= Alfred Petersson =

Swedish politician

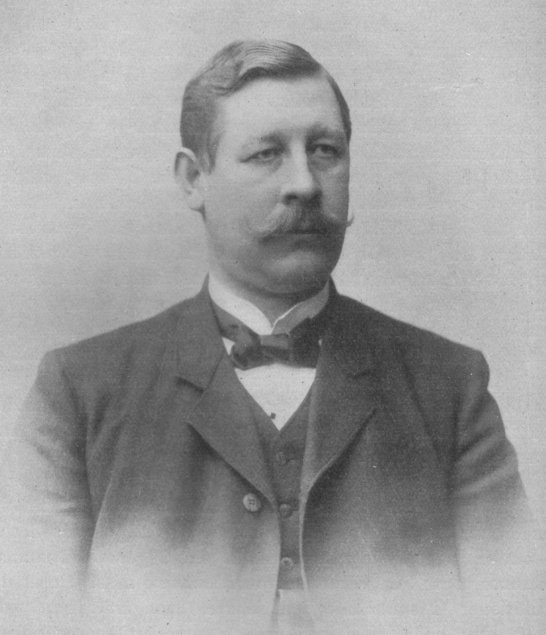
Alfred Petersson

Per Alfred Petersson (as a parliamentarian referred to as Alfred Petersson i Påboda, i.e. "in Påboda", after his home farm, and often just "Påboda") (25 June 1860 – 11 October 1920) was a Swedish politician and minister for agriculture in several cabinets.

Petersson was born into a well-to-do farmer's family in Söderåkra parish, Kalmar County, and took over the family farm Påboda in 1887. He was active in local and regional politics. In 1894 he both became a member of the Kalmar County Council and was elected member of the Second Chamber of the Swedish parliament.

Appointed minister of agriculture in the short-lived coalition cabinet of Christian Lundeberg, formed in 1905 specifically to handle the issue of the dissolution of the union with Norway, he was the first farmer to become a member of the Swedish cabinet and took an active part in the negotiations with Norway.

He was instrumental in the downfall of the liberal cabinet of Karl Staaff in 1906 over the issue of suffrage. Staaff's proposition was to extend the right to vote to adult males having paid their state and municipal taxes. The so-called Påboda program was to have proportional elections to both parliamentary chambers, rather than the majoritarian system in place and retained in the Staaff proposition. After the first chamber preferred the Påboda program to Staaff's proposition, the cabinet resigned.

Petersson was offered the premiership by the king, but declined and accepted the ministry of agriculture once more in the cabinet of the conservative leader Arvid Lindman. The new suffrage proposition presented by the Lindman cabinet was based on Petersson's original program, with some changes, was accepted by both chambers in 1907 and finally became law in 1909.

Petersson resigned from the cabinet in 1909 (together with the minister of foreign affairs Erik Birger Trolle and the minister without portfolio Gustaf Roos) because of a disagreement with Lindman over the work of the parliamentary committees and the interpretation of the Riksdagsordningen (or R.O., the law regulating the work of the parliament). Petersson joined the Liberal party and was reelected as a representative in the First Chamber for that party and the Gävleborg County in 1910 but sat as member for Jönköping County from 1911 and finally for Stockholm County from 1919 until his death the following year. He was again minister of agriculture in the second Staaff cabinet 1911-1914 and finally, for the fourth time, in the coalition cabinet of Nils Edén 1917-1920. After the resignation of the Edén cabinet in March 1920, he was appointed Governor of Stockholm County, but died on his farm Påboda in October, before actually taking office.

Preceded by Daniel Ekelund	Governor of Stockholm County; 1920	Succeeded by Nils Edén
