= Anna Breman =

Swedish banker and economist (born 1976)

13th Governor of the Reserve Bank of New Zealand
- Incumbent
- Assumed office 1 December 2025
- Preceded by: Adrian Orr

First Deputy Governor of Sveriges Riksbank
- In office 2 September 2022 – 11 October 2025

Deputy Governor of Sveriges Riksbank
- In office 1 December 2019 – 2 September 2022

Personal details
- Born: 13 May 1976 (age 50) Upplands Väsby, Sweden
- Education: Uppsala University; Stockholm School of Economics

Anna Breman (born 1976) is a Swedish banker and economist. Anna Breman took up the position of governor of the Reserve Bank of New Zealand on 1 December 2025. Her term of appointment to the RBNZ runs from 1 December 2025 to 30 November 2030. She was formerly the first deputy governor of the Sveriges Riksbank, the central bank of Sweden.

== Education ==
Breman gained her BSc in Economics from Uppsala University in 2001, and her PhD in economics from Stockholm School of Economics in 2006. During her PhD, she attended Harvard University as a visiting graduate student. In 2006 she was a visiting researcher at the University of California, San Diego.

Breman has said that Sweden's economic crisis in the early 1990s prompted her to study economics.

== Career ==
Breman began her career at the World Bank as an intern and consultant for the Health, Nutrition and Population team. After completing her PhD studies, she joined the Swedish Ministry of Finance, then moved to Swedbank as a senior economist in the research department in 2013. Breman was named group chief economist in 2015, and later also became head of Macro Research in 2018. In November 2019, following the departure of Kerstin af Jochnick in September of that year, Breman was appointed Deputy Governor of the Riksbank for a six-year term. She started her term on 1 December 2019.

=== Governor of the Reserve Bank of New Zealand ===
On the 24 of September 2025, New Zealand minister of finance Nicola Willis announced that Breman had been appointed as the new governor of the Reserve Bank of New Zealand, effective from 1 December 2025. She is the first woman and first foreign national to hold that post.

In the first weeks of her tenure as Governor of the Reserve Bank of New Zealand, Breman took a unique approach by addressing financial markets outside the bank's regular policy announcements, stating that market conditions had tightened beyond what was implied by the November monetary policy statement, with wholesale interest rates and longer-term borrowing costs rising more than projected. She emphasised that the official cash rate (OCR) was expected to remain at 2.25% if economic conditions evolved as projected, and that the Reserve Bank would continue to monitor financial conditions and their effects on households and businesses.

In January 2026, Breman signed a joint statement by international central bankers expressing "full solidarity" with United States Federal Reserve chair Jerome Powell. The statement, issued amid an ongoing conflict between Powell and US president Donald Trump, included a United States Department of Justice investigation and grand jury subpoenas related to Powell's congressional testimony on Federal Reserve building renovations. New Zealand foreign minister Winston Peters criticized the move, stating the RBNZ "has no role, nor should it involve itself, in US domestic politics" and urging Breman to "stay in her New Zealand lane" and focus on domestic monetary policy. He noted she did not consult the Ministry of Foreign Affairs and Trade. The RBNZ defended the signature as reflecting its strong commitment to central bank independence.

On 27 May 2026, Breman used her casting vote as the Reserve Bank governor to break a split deadlock on a vote by the Bank's Monetary Policy Committee on whether to raise the official cash rate. As a result, the Reserve Bank decided to maintain the official cash rate at 2.25%. This was the first time that the Bank's decision-making process was disclosed to the New Zealand public.

== Personal life ==
Breman is married and has two daughters. As of 2019, she lived in central Stockholm, and later moved to New Zealand with her whole family.
