= Financial Supervisory Authority (Sweden) =

Swedish government agency

- Finansinspektionen

Agency overview
- Formed: 1991
- Jurisdiction: Sweden
- Headquarters: Stockholm, Sweden
- Employees: 300
- Agency executive: Daniel Barr, Director General (outgoing)
- Website: www.fi.se

Financial Supervisory Authority (Swedish: Finansinspektionen, FI) is the Swedish government agency responsible for financial regulation in Sweden. It is responsible for the oversight, regulation and authorisation of financial markets and their participants. The agency falls under the Swedish Ministry of Finance and regulates all organisations that provide financial services in Sweden.

Under European Union policy frameworks, Finansinspektionen is a voting member of the respective Boards of Supervisors of the European Banking Authority (EBA), European Insurance and Occupational Pensions Authority (EIOPA), and European Securities and Markets Authority (ESMA). It provides the permanent single common representative for Sweden in the Supervisory composition of the General Board of the Anti-Money Laundering Authority (AMLA). It is also a member of the European Systemic Risk Board (ESRB).

== History ==
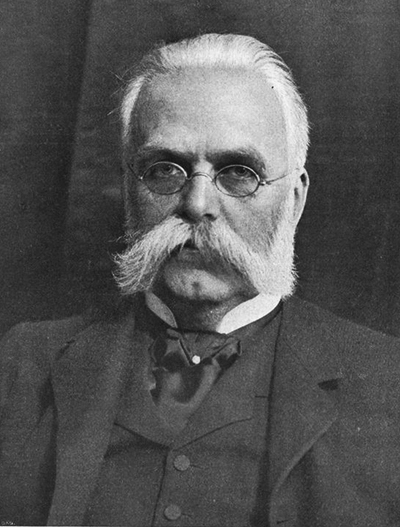
Robert Benckert (1846-1938) was the architect of the creation iN 1907 of Bankinspektionen, the main predecessor entity to Finansinspektionen

Bank regulation started in Sweden with the 1656 chartering of Stockholms Banco by Charles X Gustav, and further developed with the 1824 royal decree that authorized the formation of partnership banks known as enskilda banks (lit. 'private banks'). In 1846, a new Partnership Banking Act tasked local counties to appoint civil servants to monitor locally established banks, and mandated those banks to send financial reports to the Ministry of Finance. In 1868, the ministry created its first staff position exclusively devoted to bank licensing and regulation, and in 1876 that position was given the title of Bank Inspector. By 1889, the Bank Inspector was heading a Bank Bureau within the ministry.

Separately in 1903-1904, the Ministry of Finance established the Insurance Inspectorate or Försäkringsinspektionen for the supervision of insurance companies.

New legislation enacted in 1906 upgraded the Bank Bureau to Royal Bank Inspectorate, in Swedish Bankinspektionen. The new entity started operations on 1 January 1907 and was headed by Robert Benckert, who had been the Bank Inspector since 1889. By 1911, the Bank Inspectorate had taken over the former operations of the Bank Bureau as well as the former supervisory duties of local county administrative boards, thus becoming Continental Europe's first autonomous bank supervisor. In 1919, its role was broadened to cover investment intermediation and securities markets, and its name changed to Bank and Fund Inspectorate (Bank- och fondinspektionen). By 1920, it employed 15 examiners in addition to its administrative staff.

In 1962, the Bank and Fund Inspectorate absorbed the separate Savings Bank Inspectorate or Sparbanksinspektionen, separately established in 1929, and shortened its name back to Bank Inspectorate. In 1991, the Bank Inspectorate merged with the Insurance Inspectorate to form FI, which thus covered the full scope of banking, securities, and insurance in Sweden.

== Responsibilities ==
FI's primary responsibility is market stability and the monitoring of financial markets and participants. It also has a responsibility to provide consumer protection in relation to financial products. One of its tasks is monitoring for instability that will negatively affect the Swedish financial system. If it believes that this is the case it has a duty to report that to the Swedish government who are responsible for taking any action.

The authority has three main activities:

- Issue of permits to companies that wish to provide financial services
- Designing rules and regulations for financial activities
- Supervision of these rules and the performance of risk assessments

== Notable cases ==
In June 2020, FI fined SEB 1 billion crowns ($107.11 million) for failures in compliance and governance in relation to anti-money laundering regulations in the Baltics.

== Governance and leadership ==
FI is a Swedish government central administrative authority that falls under the Swedish Ministry of Finance. It is run by an eight-member board which is appointed by the government. This includes the head of the agency, the Director General.

=== Försäkringsinspektionen (1904-1991) ===
- 1903–1908: Lars Edvard Phragmén
- 1908–1930: Paul Laurin
- 1930–1952: Olof André Åkesson
- 1952–1967: Rickard Sterner
- 1967–1986: Malte Oredsson
- 1986–1991: Edmund Gabrielsson

=== Bankinspektionen (1907-1991) ===
- 1907–1913: Robert Benckert
- 1913–1937: Folke von Krusenstjerna
- 1937–1944: Sven Jakob Lindeberg
- 1945–1948: Albert Tondén
- 1948–1971: Kurt Wulff
- 1971–1986: Sten Walberg
- 1986–1990: Hans Löwbeer
- 1990–1991: Anders Sahlén

=== Sparbanksinspektionen (1929-1962) ===
- 1929–1934: Anton Dalin
- 1934–1946: Olof Edsman
- 1946–1962: Ernst Elof Lagerkvist

=== Finansinspektionen (since 1991) ===
- 1991–1993: Anders Sahlén
- 1993–2002: Claes Norgren
- 2003–2008: Ingrid Bonde
- 2008–2009: Erik Saers (acting)
- 2009–2015: Martin Andersson
- 2015: Martin Noréus (acting)
- 2015–2022: Erik Thedéen
- 2022–2023: Susanna Grufman
- 2023–2025: Daniel Barr
- 2025: Malin Alpen (acting)
- 2025-: Johan Almenberg

== Criticism ==
The Director General of the Financial Supervisory Authority, Daniel Barr, was forced to resign by the government in 2025 after Justitieombudsmannen had criticized how the Swedish Pensions Authority managed investments during the time Daniel Barr was Director General there. Dagens industri noted that trust in the Financial Supervisory Authority had been weakened following this scandal.

== See also ==
- Financial regulation
- Government agencies in Sweden
- Securities Commission
- List of financial supervisory authorities by country
