= Stockholm Municipality (Riksdag constituency) =

Constituency of the Riksdag, the national legislature of Sweden

- Stockholms Kommun
- Constituency for the Riksdag
- Location of Stockholm Municipality within Sweden
- Municipality: Stockholm
- County: Stockholm
- Population: 999,239 (2025)
- Electorate: 765,741 (2026)
- Area: 209 km^{2} (2026)

Current constituency
- Created: 1970
- Seats: List (Note: Constituency seats only.): 29 (2014–present); 28 (2010–2014); 27 (2002–2010); 26 (1998–2002); 25 (1985–1998); 26 (1979–1985); 27 (1976–1979); 29 (1973–1976); 31 (1970–1973)
- Member of the Riksdag: List: Martin Ådahl (C); Talla Alkurdi (S); Kristina Axén Olin (M); Gurgîn Bakircioglu (MP); Malin Björk (V); Charlotte Broberg (M); Camilla Brodin (KD); Linus Bylund (SD); Joar Forssell (L); Merit Frost Lindberg (M); Ida Gabrielsson (V); Sophia Granswed Baat (M); Jytte Guteland (S); Ilyas Hassan (V); Daniel Helldén (MP); Elin Hjelmestam (L); Lotta Högström (M); Markus Kallifatides (S); Kadir Kasirga (S); Andreas Lennkvist Manriquez (V); Åsa Lindhagen (MP); Martin Melin (L); Carl Nordblom (M); Birgitta Ohlsson (C); Mirja Räihä (S); Lawen Redar (S); Elisabeth Thand Ringqvist (C); Johan Tireland (SD); Daniel Vencu Öhrlund Castro (S); Mattias Vepsä (S); Nila Vikhe Patil (MP); Henrik Vinge (SD); Ulrika Westerlund (MP); Anders Ygeman (S)
- Created from: Stockholm City

Stockholm Municipality (Swedish: Stockholms Kommun) is one of the 29 multi-member constituencies of the Riksdag, the national legislature of Sweden. The constituency was established in 1970 when the Riksdag changed from a bicameral legislature to a unicameral legislature. It is conterminous with the municipality of Stockholm. The constituency currently elects 29 of the 349 members of the Riksdag using the open party-list proportional representation electoral system. At the 2026 general election it had 765,741 registered electors.

== Electoral system ==
Stockholm Municipality currently elects 29 of the 349 members of the Riksdag using the open party-list proportional representation electoral system. Constituency seats are allocated using the modified Sainte-Laguë method. Only parties that reach the 4% national threshold and parties that receive at least 12% of the vote in the constituency compete for constituency seats. Supplementary levelling seats may also be allocated at the constituency level to parties that reach the 4% national threshold.

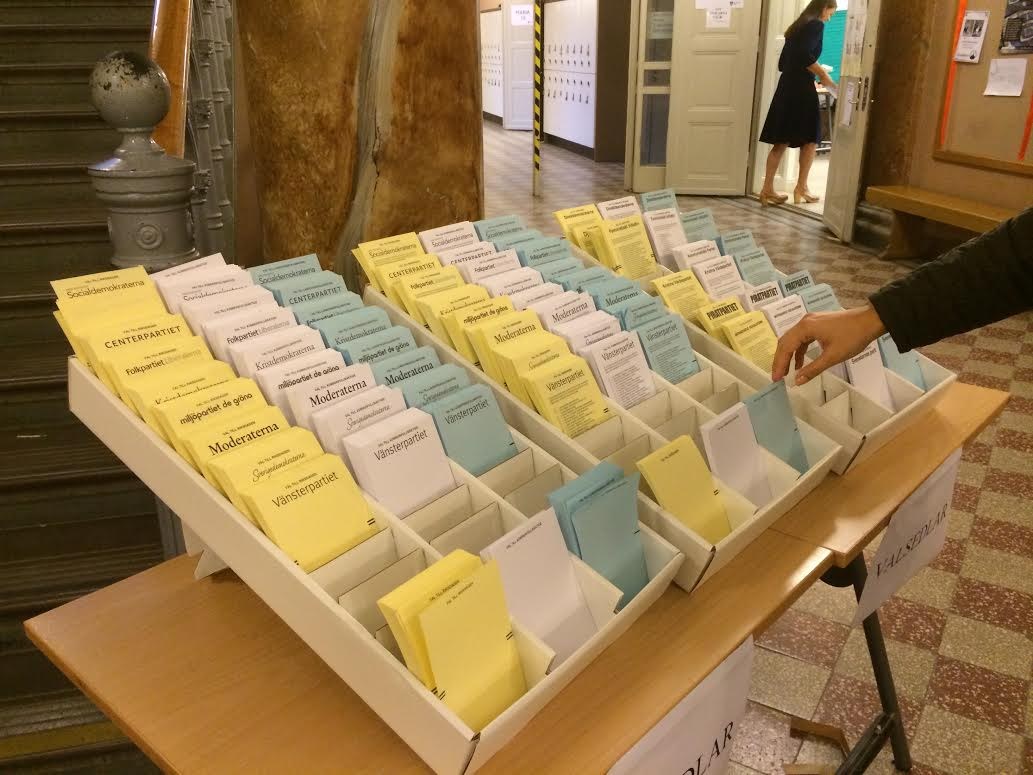
A selection of ballot papers available for voters at the 2014 general election in Stockholm - yellow for the Riksdag, blue for the regional council and white for the municipal council

Prior to 1997 voters could cast any ballot paper they wanted, though it had to contain the name of a party and the name of at least one candidate nominated by that party in the constituency. It was common for parties to hand out ballot papers with their name and list of candidates at the entrance of polling stations. Voters could delete the names of candidates or write-in the names of other candidates but in practice these options weren't used enough by voters to have any significant impact on the results and consequently elections operated as a closed system.

Since 1997, elections in Sweden follow the French model in having separate ballot papers for each party/list in a constituency. There are two ballot papers for each party - a party ballot paper (partivalsedel) with just the name of the party and a name ballot paper (namnvalsedel) with the name of the party and its list of candidates. There are also blank ballot papers (blank valsedel). Voters can initially pick as many ballot papers as they wish and then, in the secrecy of the voting booth, they select a single ballot paper of their choice. If they chose a name ballot paper they have the option of casting a preferential vote for one of their chosen party's candidates. If they chose a blank ballot paper they can write the name of any party including unregistered parties and, optionally, they can write the name of any person as their preferred candidate, even one that does not belong to their chosen party. They then place their chosen ballot paper in an envelope which is placed in the ballot box, discarding all other ballot papers they picked.

Seats won by each party/list in a constituency are allocated to its candidates in order of preference votes (a personal mandate), provided that the candidate has received at least 8% of votes cast for their party in the constituency (5% since January 2011). Any unfilled seats are then allocated to the party's remaining candidates in the order they appear on the party list (a party mandate).

== Election results ==
=== Summary ===
Election	Left V / VPK			Social Democrats S			Greens MP			Centre C			Liberals L / FP / F			Moderates M			Christian Democrats KD / KDS			Sweden Democrats SD		
Election	Votes	%	Seats	Votes	%	Seats	Votes	%	Seats	Votes	%	Seats	Votes	%	Seats	Votes	%	Seats	Votes	%	Seats	Votes	%	Seats
2026	85,059	13.04%	4	171,898	26.34%	8	72,681	11.14%	3	63,857	9.79%	3	46,361	7.10%	2	124,639	19.10%	6	25,450	3.90%	1	54,512	8.35%	2
2022	71,171	11.73%	3	170,308	28.07%	8	60,791	10.02%	3	51,437	8.48%	3	41,663	6.87%	2	115,706	19.07%	6	19,227	3.17%	1	64,730	10.67%	3
2018	80,217	13.12%	4	145,245	23.76%	7	47,044	7.70%	2	55,428	9.07%	3	47,988	7.85%	2	133,731	21.88%	7	29,776	4.87%	1	60,135	9.84%	3
2014	44,656	7.73%	2	124,792	21.61%	7	64,392	11.15%	4	28,201	4.88%	2	45,365	7.85%	2	160,166	27.73%	9	24,691	4.28%	1	38,356	6.64%	2
2010	39,565	7.40%	2	111,688	20.88%	6	65,351	12.22%	3	33,895	6.34%	2	45,939	8.59%	2	183,421	34.29%	10	28,244	5.28%	2	16,950	3.17%	1
2006	35,616	7.38%	2	111,765	23.17%	6	45,030	9.33%	3	27,257	5.65%	2	48,476	10.05%	3	169,211	35.07%	10	24,327	5.04%	1	7,912	1.64%	0
2002	49,795	10.87%	3	143,640	31.36%	9	31,027	6.77%	2	8,109	1.77%	0	89,510	19.54%	5	96,205	21.01%	6	30,228	6.60%	2	4,706	1.03%	0
1998	56,663	12.93%	4	119,270	27.21%	7	24,362	5.56%	2	7,493	1.71%	0	33,027	7.54%	2	147,599	33.68%	9	39,100	8.92%	2			
1994	36,768	8.39%	2	152,722	34.83%	9	25,595	5.84%	1	13,996	3.19%	1	44,707	10.20%	3	140,982	32.16%	8	13,303	3.03%	1			
1991	30,956	7.15%	2	129,108	29.80%	8	22,979	5.30%	0	12,656	2.92%	1	49,510	11.43%	3	133,141	30.73%	8	21,233	4.90%	1			
1988	44,339	10.25%	3	145,524	33.65%	8	29,894	6.91%	2	18,195	4.21%	1	62,511	14.45%	4	119,567	27.65%	7	7,834	1.81%	0			
1985	43,384	9.57%	2	172,352	38.04%	10	7,870	1.74%	0	16,745	3.70%	1	71,639	15.81%	4	136,899	30.21%	8	with C					
1982	45,737	10.08%	3	178,565	39.37%	10	10,021	2.21%	0	33,062	7.29%	2	26,721	5.89%	2	152,817	33.69%	9	4,371	0.96%	0			
1979	47,513	10.48%	3	171,474	37.83%	10				40,676	8.97%	2	53,261	11.75%	3	132,224	29.17%	8	3,483	0.77%	0			
1976	41,542	8.82%	2	179,710	38.15%	10				62,543	13.28%	4	62,680	13.31%	4	116,787	24.79%	7	3,642	0.77%	0			
1973	43,196	9.20%	3	184,758	39.36%	12				69,687	14.85%	4	52,728	11.23%	3	109,549	23.34%	7	4,627	0.99%	0			
1970	36,084	7.35%	2	208,967	42.57%	14				49,183	10.02%	3	103,170	21.02%	7	82,152	16.74%	5	5,869	1.20%	0			

(Excludes levelling seats. Figures in italics represent alliances/joint lists.)

=== Detailed ===
Party has received at least 4% of the vote nationally and is entitled to compete for constituency seats.

==== 2020s ====
===== 2026 =====
Results of the 2026 general election held on 13 September 2026:

Party		Votes per municipal electoral district						Total votes	%	Seats		
Party		Bromma– Kungs- holmen	Norr- malm– Öster- malm- Gamla Stan	Östra Söder- ort	Söder- malm– Enskede	Västra Söder- ort	Yttre Väster- ort	Total votes	%	Con.	Lev.	Tot.
Swedish Social Democratic Party	S	23,894	18,924	31,749	35,003	32,952	29,376	171,898	26.34%	8	1	9
Moderate Party	M	28,124	37,552	12,295	18,931	15,434	12,303	124,639	19.10%	6	0	6
Left Party	V	6,772	4,928	19,396	15,056	17,787	21,120	85,059	13.04%	4	0	4
Green Party	MP	10,192	8,138	14,649	20,368	14,071	5,263	72,681	11.14%	3	2	5
Centre Party	C	14,614	14,857	6,681	13,943	8,974	4,788	63,857	9.79%	3	0	3
Sweden Democrats	SD	9,235	9,464	9,839	9,014	9,022	7,938	54,512	8.35%	2	1	3
Liberals	L	10,760	14,840	4,051	8,337	5,062	3,311	46,361	7.10%	2	1	3
Christian Democrats	KD	5,582	6,705	2,877	3,806	3,435	3,045	25,450	3.90%	1	0	1
Alternative for Sweden	AfS	356	411	409	332	333	269	2,110	0.32%	0	0	0
Örebro Party	ÖP	314	267	333	327	245	213	1,699	0.26%	0	0	0
Pirate Party	PP	158	112	211	177	206	163	1,027	0.16%	0	0	0
Ambition Sweden	AS	98	106	123	107	88	89	611	0.09%	0	0	0
Christian Values Party	KrVP	82	59	85	60	87	176	549	0.08%	0	0	0
Citizens' Coalition	MED	108	93	75	68	64	63	471	0.07%	0	0	0
Human Rights and Democracy	MoD	64	55	80	102	59	44	404	0.06%	0	0	0
Communist Party of Sweden	SKP	24	25	75	33	72	78	307	0.05%	0	0	0
Nuance Party	PNy	6	6	22	11	49	135	229	0.04%	0	0	0
United Voice	ER	19	10	53	36	38	34	190	0.03%	0	0	0
Direct Democrats	DD	22	17	27	23	22	12	123	0.02%	0	0	0
RegleraAI.nu		13	11	3	17	15	4	63	0.01%	0	0	0
Nordic Resistance Movement	NMR	0	2	15	6	7	5	35	0.01%	0	0	0
Turning Point Party	PV	2	3	11	5	5	7	33	0.01%	0	0	0
Communist Party	K	3	4	5	4	9	5	30	0.00%	0	0	0
Volt Sweden	Volt	6	3	4	7	4	0	24	0.00%	0	0	0
NY Reform	NR	3	1	2	0	13	4	23	0.00%	0	0	0
Classical Liberal Party	KLP	4	7	3	4	4	0	22	0.00%	0	0	0
Donald Duck Party		4	3	2	2	2	2	15	0.00%	0	0	0
Unity	ENH	2	2	2	3	2	0	11	0.00%	0	0	0
The Push Buttons	Kn	1	0	5	1	3	0	10	0.00%	0	0	0
A Good Sweden		2	1	1	1	0	3	8	0.00%	0	0	0
Architecture Uprising Party		1	3	0	0	2	1	7	0.00%	0	0	0
United Sweden		0	0	3	0	2	2	7	0.00%	0	0	0
AI Party		1	1	0	3	1	0	6	0.00%	0	0	0
Independent Rural Party	LPo	1	1	0	0	1	3	6	0.00%	0	0	0
Jesus		1	0	0	1	0	4	6	0.00%	0	0	0
Evil Chicken Party	OKP	1	1	1	0	1	1	5	0.00%	0	0	0
Knowledge-Democratic Party		1	1	0	0	0	3	5	0.00%	0	0	0
Animal Lovers' Party		0	1	0	2	1	0	4	0.00%	0	0	0
O		0	0	0	1	3	0	4	0.00%	0	0	0
John Party with Extra Moose		1	1	0	0	1	0	3	0.00%	0	0	0
Lovely		0	2	0	0	1	0	3	0.00%	0	0	0
The Anarchists		0	0	1	1	1	0	3	0.00%	0	0	0
Anti-Authoritarian Action Party		0	1	0	1	0	0	2	0.00%	0	0	0
Enterprise Sweden		0	2	0	0	0	0	2	0.00%	0	0	0
Pax		0	0	0	2	0	0	2	0.00%	0	0	0
Responsible Intelligence in Politics		1	1	0	0	0	0	2	0.00%	0	0	0
Socialist Party		0	2	0	0	0	0	2	0.00%	0	0	0
The Libertarians		0	2	0	0	0	0	2	0.00%	0	0	0
A Wise Move: Abolishing the Right to Asylum!		0	0	0	1	0	0	1	0.00%	0	0	0
Civis		0	0	0	0	0	1	1	0.00%	0	0	0
Conservative Party		0	0	1	0	0	0	1	0.00%	0	0	0
Electoral Cooperation Party		0	0	0	1	0	0	1	0.00%	0	0	0
Forest People		0	0	0	0	0	1	1	0.00%	0	0	0
Free Choice		0	0	0	0	0	1	1	0.00%	0	0	0
Friends of Hemp		0	1	0	0	0	0	1	0.00%	0	0	0
Human Capitalists		0	0	0	1	0	0	1	0.00%	0	0	0
Kingdom		0	0	0	0	1	0	1	0.00%	0	0	0
koalitionsbyggarna.se		0	0	0	0	1	0	1	0.00%	0	0	0
New Allance		0	0	0	0	1	0	1	0.00%	0	0	0
Origin		0	0	0	0	0	1	1	0.00%	0	0	0
Peace and Democracy		0	0	0	0	0	1	1	0.00%	0	0	0
Peace Party		0	0	1	0	0	0	1	0.00%	0	0	0
Peace Team		0	1	0	0	0	0	1	0.00%	0	0	0
Pensioners' Party		0	1	0	0	0	0	1	0.00%	0	0	0
Secular Humanist Party		0	0	1	0	0	0	1	0.00%	0	0	0
Security Party	TRP	0	0	0	1	0	0	1	0.00%	0	0	0
Sun's Freedom Party		1	0	0	0	0	0	1	0.00%	0	0	0
Swedish-Finnish Union Party		0	1	0	0	0	0	1	0.00%	0	0	0
Viking		0	0	0	0	0	1	1	0.00%	0	0	0
Valid votes		110,473	116,629	103,091	125,799	108,081	88,470	652,543	100.00%	29	5	34
Blank votes		585	507	733	731	722	542	3,820	0.58%			
Rejected votes – unregistered parties		22	12	29	18	16	17	114	0.02%			
Rejected votes – other		155	133	141	142	168	130	869	0.13%			
Total polled		111,235	117,281	103,994	126,690	108,987	89,159	657,346	85.84%			
Registered electors		124,884	131,254	123,667	141,337	127,842	116,757	765,741				
Turnout		89.07%	89.35%	84.09%	89.64%	85.25%	76.36%	85.84%				

The following candidates were elected:

- Constituency seats (personal mandates) - Ilyas Hassan (V), 5,981 votes; Daniel Helldén (MP), 4,297 votes; Birgitta Ohlsson (C), 6,460 votes; Romina Pourmokhtari (L), 2,494 votes; Elisabeth Thand Ringqvist (C), 7,800 votes; and Anders Ygeman (S), 9,149 votes.
- Constituency seats (party mandates) - Martin Ådahl (C), 499 votes; Talla Alkurdi (S), 620 votes; Kristina Axén Olin (M), 249 votes; Malin Björk (V), 835 votes; Camilla Brodin (KD), 28 votes; Benjamin Dousa (M), 1,257 votes; Lotta Edholm (L), 311 votes; Johan Forssell (M), 640 votes; Ida Gabrielsson (V), 747 votes; Jytte Guteland (S), 983 votes; Markus Kallifatides (S), 866 votes; Kadir Kasirga (S), 700 votes; Andreas Lennkvist Manriquez (V), 375 votes; Åsa Lindhagen (MP), 2,712 votes; Carl Nordblom (M), 165 votes; Mirja Räihä (S), 930 votes; Lawen Redar (S), 3,677 votes; Jessica Rosencrantz (M), 539 votes; Gunnar Strömmer (M), 5,812 votes; Johan Tireland (SD), 2 votes; Mattias Vepsä (S), 769 votes; Henrik Vinge (SD), 149 votes; and Ulrika Westerlund (MP), 187 votes.
- Levelling seats (party mandates) - Gurgîn Bakircioglu (MP), 2,062 votes; Linus Bylund (SD), 45 votes; Joar Forssell (L), 242 votes; Daniel Vencu Velasquez Castro (S), 570 votes; and Nila Vikhe Patil (MP), 85 votes.

===== 2022 =====
Results of the 2022 general election held on 11 September 2022:

Party		Votes per municipal electoral district						Total votes	%	Seats		
Party		Bromma– Kungs- holmen	Norr- malm– Öster- malm- Gamla Stan	Östra Söder- ort	Söder- malm– Enskede	Västra Söder- ort	Yttre Väster- ort	Total votes	%	Con.	Lev.	Tot.
Swedish Social Democratic Party	S	25,750	21,004	30,726	36,760	31,552	24,516	170,308	28.07%	8	1	9
Moderate Party	M	26,135	34,779	11,147	17,300	14,333	12,012	115,706	19.07%	6	0	6
Left Party	V	6,804	5,255	16,769	15,373	14,899	12,071	71,171	11.73%	3	1	4
Sweden Democrats	SD	10,922	11,777	11,439	11,064	10,420	9,108	64,730	10.67%	3	1	4
Green Party	MP	8,918	7,688	11,396	17,352	11,127	4,310	60,791	10.02%	3	1	4
Centre Party	C	11,605	11,828	5,628	10,484	7,149	4,743	51,437	8.48%	3	0	3
Liberals	L	10,027	12,372	3,741	7,481	4,874	3,168	41,663	6.87%	2	1	3
Christian Democrats	KD	3,991	5,049	2,236	2,755	2,595	2,601	19,227	3.17%	1	0	1
Nuance Party	PNy	80	41	433	85	709	3,286	4,634	0.76%	0	0	0
Citizens' Coalition	MED	383	412	244	305	260	156	1,760	0.29%	0	0	0
Alternative for Sweden	AfS	198	233	241	255	208	175	1,310	0.22%	0	0	0
Pirate Party	PP	157	148	239	220	217	191	1,172	0.19%	0	0	0
Human Rights and Democracy	MoD	105	71	154	131	87	62	610	0.10%	0	0	0
Feminist Initiative	FI	50	54	98	80	108	71	461	0.08%	0	0	0
Christian Values Party	KrVP	48	31	74	45	65	112	375	0.06%	0	0	0
The Push Buttons	Kn	56	41	82	59	61	40	339	0.06%	0	0	0
Climate Alliance	KA	42	42	48	63	40	16	251	0.04%	0	0	0
Direct Democrats	DD	38	23	47	34	36	28	206	0.03%	0	0	0
Communist Party of Sweden	SKP	16	9	26	15	39	43	148	0.02%	0	0	0
Unity	ENH	29	14	21	16	12	6	98	0.02%	0	0	0
Classical Liberal Party	KLP	9	10	8	15	9	5	56	0.01%	0	0	0
Nordic Resistance Movement	NMR	5	8	13	9	8	10	53	0.01%	0	0	0
Basic Income Party	BASIP	4	5	16	3	5	6	39	0.01%	0	0	0
Turning Point Party	PV	1	7	11	5	4	6	34	0.01%	0	0	0
Independent Rural Party	LPo	5	8	2	4	4	4	27	0.00%	0	0	0
Freedom Party		1	3	5	2	0	6	17	0.00%	0	0	0
Hard Line Sweden		1	5	5	3	0	1	15	0.00%	0	0	0
Volt Sweden	Volt	3	4	0	6	1	1	15	0.00%	0	0	0
NY Reform	NR	1	0	0	0	10	3	14	0.00%	0	0	0
Socialist Welfare Party	S-V	2	0	4	2	3	2	13	0.00%	0	0	0
Sweden Out of the EU/ Free Justice Party		0	3	1	3	1	4	12	0.00%	0	0	0
Donald Duck Party		3	0	4	1	2	1	11	0.00%	0	0	0
Evil Chicken Party	OKP	0	0	2	0	1	5	8	0.00%	0	0	0
Scania Party	SKÅ	2	1	1	2	0	0	6	0.00%	0	0	0
European Workers Party	EAP	0	1	1	1	1	1	5	0.00%	0	0	0
Freedom of the Family		0	0	3	1	1	0	5	0.00%	0	0	0
National Law of Sweden		0	0	3	0	0	0	3	0.00%	0	0	0
Electoral Cooperation Party		0	0	0	0	0	2	2	0.00%	0	0	0
Enterprise Sweden		0	2	0	0	0	0	2	0.00%	0	0	0
Freedom Movement		0	0	0	0	0	2	2	0.00%	0	0	0
Political Shift		0	0	1	1	0	0	2	0.00%	0	0	0
Reform Party		1	0	0	0	1	0	2	0.00%	0	0	0
My Voice		0	0	0	0	0	1	1	0.00%	0	0	0
New Democracy		1	0	0	0	0	0	1	0.00%	0	0	0
Nix to the Six		0	0	0	1	0	0	1	0.00%	0	0	0
OK		0	0	0	0	1	0	1	0.00%	0	0	0
Poor Man's Party		0	0	0	0	1	0	1	0.00%	0	0	0
Referendum Party		0	0	0	0	0	1	1	0.00%	0	0	0
Sweden Party		0	0	0	0	0	1	1	0.00%	0	0	0
The Anarchists		0	0	0	1	0	0	1	0.00%	0	0	0
The Least Bad Party		1	0	0	0	0	0	1	0.00%	0	0	0
The Swedes		1	0	0	0	0	0	1	0.00%	0	0	0
United Democratic Party		0	0	1	0	0	0	1	0.00%	0	0	0
Valid votes		105,395	110,928	94,870	119,937	98,844	76,777	606,751	100.00%	29	5	34
Blank votes		694	623	809	794	782	609	4,311	0.70%			
Rejected votes – unregistered parties		18	19	42	33	25	17	154	0.03%			
Rejected votes – other		97	133	106	99	99	155	689	0.11%			
Total polled		106,204	111,703	95,827	120,863	99,750	77,558	611,905	84.04%			
Registered electors								728,089				
Turnout								84.04%				

The following candidates were elected:

- Constituency seats (personal mandates) - Per Bolund (MP), 4,291 votes.
- Constituency seats (party mandates) - Martin Ådahl (C), 282 votes; Kristina Axén Olin (M), 542 votes; Malin Björk (C), 179 votes; Camilla Brodin (KD), 28 votes; Margareta Cederfelt (M), 138 votes; Lorena Delgado Varas (V), 350 votes; Ali Esbati (V), 1,326 votes; Joar Forssell (L), 128 votes; Johan Forssell (M), 1,690 votes; Jytte Guteland (S), 1,566 votes; Markus Kallifatides (S), 1,381 votes; Arin Karapet (M), 181 votes; Fredrik Kärrholm (M), 2,576 votes; Kadir Kasirga (S), 1,014 votes; Gabriel Kroon (SD), 9 votes; Åsa Lindhagen (MP), 1,115 votes; Romina Pourmokhtari (L), 1,019 votes; Karin Rågsjö (V), 345 votes; Mirja Räihä (S), 1,106 votes; Lawen Redar (S), 1,201 votes; Jessica Rosencrantz (M), 526 votes; Annika Strandhäll (S), 2,923 votes; Elisabeth Thand Ringqvist (C), 270 votes; Mattias Vepsä (S), 439 votes; Henrik Vinge (SD), 149 votes; Ulrika Westerlund (MP), 823 votes; Elsa Widding (SD), 944 votes; and Anders Ygeman (S), 6,979 votes.
- Levelling seats (party mandates) - Angelika Bengtsson (SD), 64 votes; Malin Danielsson (L), 37 votes; Ida Gabrielsson (V), 142 votes; Daniel Helldén (MP), 812 votes; and Daniel Vencu Velasquez Castro (S), 341 votes.

Permanent substitutions:

- Gabriel Kroon (SD) resigned on 12 October 2022 and was replaced by Martin Westmont (SD) on the same day.
- Åsa Lindhagen (MP) resigned on 18 October 2022 and was replaced by Katarina Luhr (MP) on the same day.
- Per Bolund (MP) resigned on 31 December 2023 and was replaced by Mats Berglund (MP) on 1 January 2024.
- Ali Esbati (V) resigned on 7 January 2024 and was replaced by Andreas Lennkvist Manriquez (V) on 8 January 2024.

==== 2010s ====
===== 2018 =====
Results of the 2018 general election held on 9 September 2018:

Party		Votes per municipal electoral district						Total votes	%	Seats		
Party		Bromma– Kungs- holmen	Norr- malm– Öster- malm- Gamla Stan	Östra Söder- ort	Söder- malm– Enskede	Västra Söder- ort	Yttre Väster- ort	Total votes	%	Con.	Lev.	Tot.
Swedish Social Democratic Party	S	18,233	14,346	27,899	29,023	27,386	28,358	145,245	23.76%	7	1	8
Moderate Party	M	29,872	37,685	13,830	20,563	16,745	15,036	133,731	21.88%	7	0	7
Left Party	V	8,387	6,677	18,028	19,771	16,693	10,661	80,217	13.12%	4	0	4
Sweden Democrats	SD	9,929	10,671	10,727	10,296	9,793	8,719	60,135	9.84%	3	0	3
Centre Party	C	12,728	12,268	6,271	11,396	7,903	4,862	55,428	9.07%	3	0	3
Liberals	L	11,288	11,898	4,930	9,315	6,029	4,528	47,988	7.85%	2	1	3
Green Party	MP	7,496	6,281	7,973	12,936	8,388	3,970	47,044	7.70%	2	1	3
Christian Democrats	KD	6,391	8,007	3,366	4,542	3,737	3,733	29,776	4.87%	1	0	1
Feminist Initiative	FI	568	489	991	1,038	826	448	4,360	0.71%	0	0	0
Alternative for Sweden	AfS	383	469	388	421	299	266	2,226	0.36%	0	0	0
Citizens' Coalition	MED	397	359	224	332	268	172	1,752	0.29%	0	0	0
Pirate Party	PP	110	100	184	153	147	153	847	0.14%	0	0	0
Direct Democrats	DD	89	53	114	82	67	87	492	0.08%	0	0	0
Animal Party	DjuP	62	65	83	76	80	47	413	0.07%	0	0	0
Unity	ENH	79	43	82	84	71	47	406	0.07%	0	0	0
Christian Values Party	KrVP	18	44	68	27	27	135	319	0.05%	0	0	0
Classical Liberal Party	KLP	34	43	25	51	17	34	204	0.03%	0	0	0
Initiative	INI	21	39	35	26	30	11	162	0.03%	0	0	0
Communist Party of Sweden	SKP	14	9	31	15	27	49	145	0.02%	0	0	0
Nordic Resistance Movement	NMR	17	20	20	22	26	20	125	0.02%	0	0	0
Basic Income Party	BASIP	5	6	10	8	9	8	46	0.01%	0	0	0
Independent Rural Party	LPo	10	7	5	12	6	5	45	0.01%	0	0	0
Freedom of the Justice Party	S-FRP	3	1	4	5	1	8	22	0.00%	0	0	0
European Workers Party	EAP	1	0	1	5	4	1	12	0.00%	0	0	0
NY Reform		0	0	2	0	0	2	4	0.00%	0	0	0
Parties not on the ballot		13	4	15	11	16	3	62	0.01%	0	0	0
Valid votes		106,148	109,584	95,306	120,210	98,595	81,363	611,206	100.00%	29	3	32
Blank votes		409	320	652	591	602	461	3,035	0.49%			
Rejected votes – unregistered parties		31	35	53	53	31	33	236	0.04%			
Rejected votes – other		73	55	87	60	49	59	383	0.06%			
Total polled		106,661	109,994	96,098	120,914	99,277	81,916	614,860	87.32%			
Registered electors		117,065	121,034	112,834	133,306	115,034	104,884	704,157				
Turnout		91.11%	90.88%	85.17%	90.70%	86.30%	78.10%	87.32%				

The following candidates were elected:

- Constituency seats (personal mandates) - Ulf Kristersson (M), 29,007 votes; Isabella Lövin (MP), 4,933 votes; and Anders Ygeman (S), 10,254 votes.
- Constituency seats (party mandates) - Martin Ådahl (C), 293 votes; Beatrice Ask (M), 733 votes; Gulan Avci (L), 630 votes; Kristina Axén Olin (M), 1,065 votes; Per Bolund (MP), 803 votes; Margareta Cederfelt (M), 176 votes; Nooshi Dadgostar (V), 1,127 votes; Yasmine Eriksson (SD), 67 votes; Ali Esbati (V), 1,299 votes; Johan Forssell (M), 636 votes; Johan Hedin (C), 102 votes; Jens Holm (V), 674 votes; Ylva Johansson (S), 2,562 votes; Johanna Jönsson (C), 522 votes; Arin Karapet (M), 312 votes; Kadir Kasirga (S), 784 votes; Dag Larsson (S), 423 votes; Fredrik Malm (L), 458 votes; Katja Nyberg (SD), 102 votes; Anders Österberg (S), 826 votes; Karin Rågsjö (V), 517 votes; Lawen Redar (S), 1,213 votes; Jessica Rosencrantz (M), 432 votes; Annika Strandhäll (S), 2,027 votes; Caroline Szyber (KD), 230 votes; and Henrik Vinge (SD), 134 votes.
- Levelling seats (party mandates) - Maria Ferm (MP), 926 votes; Joar Forssell (L), 443 votes; and Teres Lindberg (S), 445 votes.

Permanent substitutions:

- Caroline Szyber (KD) resigned on 24 September 2018 and was replaced by Désirée Pethrus (KD) on the same day.
- Ylva Johansson (S) resigned on 5 September 2019 and was replaced by Thomas Hammarberg (S) on the same day.
- Beatrice Ask (M) resigned on 31 December 2019 and was replaced by Lars Jilmstad (M) on 1 January 2020.
- Kadir Kasirga (S) resigned on 8 March 2020 and was replaced by Sultan Kayhan (S) on 9 March 2020.
- Isabella Lövin (MP) resigned on 31 January 2021 and was replaced by Lorentz Tovatt (MP) on 1 February 2021.
- Désirée Pethrus (KD) resigned on 11 February 2021 and was replaced by Christian Carlsson (KD) on the same day.
- Johanna Jönsson (C) resigned on 2 September 2021 and was replaced by Malin Björk (C) on the same day.
- Thomas Hammarberg (S) resigned on 31 January 2022 and was replaced by Mattias Vepsä (S) on 1 February 2022.
- Dag Larsson (S) resigned on 7 June 2022 and was replaced by Elsemarie Bjellqvist (S) on the same day.

===== 2014 =====
Results of the 2014 general election held on 14 September 2014:

Party		Votes per municipal electoral district						Total votes	%	Seats		
Party		Bromma– Kungs- holmen	Norr- malm– Öster- malm- Gamla Stan	Östra Söder- ort	Söder- malm– Enskede	Västra Söder- ort	Yttre Väster- ort	Total votes	%	Con.	Lev.	Tot.
Moderate Party	M	34,529	44,188	16,966	26,917	20,032	17,534	160,166	27.73%	9	0	9
Swedish Social Democratic Party	S	14,288	10,667	26,122	22,637	23,902	27,176	124,792	21.61%	7	0	7
Green Party	MP	10,137	8,216	11,061	16,470	11,252	7,256	64,392	11.15%	4	0	4
Liberal People's Party	FP	10,376	11,979	4,421	8,846	5,443	4,300	45,365	7.85%	2	1	3
Left Party	V	4,770	3,960	9,605	11,413	8,773	6,135	44,656	7.73%	2	1	3
Feminist Initiative	FI	5,388	4,946	7,653	12,871	7,973	2,657	41,488	7.18%	0	0	0
Sweden Democrats	SD	6,124	6,037	7,169	6,757	6,300	5,969	38,356	6.64%	2	0	2
Centre Party	C	6,436	6,545	3,184	5,784	3,880	2,372	28,201	4.88%	2	0	2
Christian Democrats	KD	5,485	7,241	2,456	3,599	2,809	3,101	24,691	4.28%	1	1	2
Pirate Party	PP	353	348	501	457	399	429	2,487	0.43%	0	0	0
Unity	ENH	95	59	138	120	75	63	550	0.10%	0	0	0
Animal Party	DjuP	87	93	115	104	88	58	545	0.09%	0	0	0
Party of the Swedes	SVP	42	60	83	44	68	48	345	0.06%	0	0	0
Christian Values Party	KrVP	41	34	68	26	47	66	282	0.05%	0	0	0
Direct Democrats	DD	27	21	33	48	27	27	183	0.03%	0	0	0
Classical Liberal Party	KLP	28	44	27	21	34	18	172	0.03%	0	0	0
Communist Party of Sweden	SKP	14	10	27	20	24	53	148	0.03%	0	0	0
Socialist Justice Party	RS	5	1	36	17	18	67	144	0.02%	0	0	0
European Workers Party	EAP	4	5	4	9	8	11	41	0.01%	0	0	0
Independent Rural Party	LPo	2	3	2	3	7	0	17	0.00%	0	0	0
Swedish Senior Citizen Interest Party	SPI	2	3	6	0	1	5	17	0.00%	0	0	0
New Swedes	DPNS	0	1	0	2	10	2	15	0.00%	0	0	0
Freedom of the Justice Party	S-FRP	3	1	2	3	1	4	14	0.00%	0	0	0
New Party		2	0	0	0	1	0	3	0.00%	0	0	0
Peace Democrats	FD	0	0	0	1	1	1	3	0.00%	0	0	0
Progressive Party		1	0	1	0	0	0	2	0.00%	0	0	0
Crossroads	VägV	0	0	0	1	0	0	1	0.00%	0	0	0
Republicans		0	0	0	0	1	0	1	0.00%	0	0	0
Parties not on the ballot		50	76	128	86	88	60	488	0.08%	0	0	0
Valid votes		98,289	104,538	89,808	116,256	91,262	77,412	577,565	100.00%	29	3	32
Blank votes		494	410	677	631	566	475	3,253	0.56%			
Rejected votes – other		35	28	46	43	50	45	247	0.04%			
Total polled		98,818	104,976	90,531	116,930	91,878	77,932	581,065	85.81%			
Registered electors		110,206	117,689	108,477	130,927	108,416	101,429	677,144				
Turnout		89.67%	89.20%	83.46%	89.31%	84.75%	76.83%	85.81%				

The following candidates were elected:

- Constituency seats (personal mandates) - Stefan Löfven (S), 21,378 votes; Birgitta Ohlsson (FP), 6,646 votes; Fredrik Reinfeldt (M), 42,873 votes; and Åsa Romson (MP), 6,320 votes.
- Constituency seats (party mandates) - Maria Abrahamsson (M), 957 votes; Amir Adan (M), 422 votes; Sofia Arkelsten (M), 416 votes; Beatrice Ask (M), 405 votes; Angelika Bengtsson (SD), 22 votes; Per Bolund (MP), 920 votes; Margareta Cederfelt (M), 227 votes; Maria Ferm (MP), 1,174 votes; Johan Forssell (M), 235 votes; Tina Ghasemi (M), 710 votes; Arhe Hamednaca (S), 520 votes; Johan Hedin (C), 318 votes; Jens Holm (V), 506 votes; Carin Jämtin (S), 1,907 votes; Ylva Johansson (S), 595 votes; Johanna Jönsson (C), 281 votes; Adam Marttinen (SD), 3 votes; Per Olsson (MP), 353 votes; Emanuel Öz (S), 776 votes; Veronica Palm (S), 1,111 votes; Karin Rågsjö (V), 336 votes; Jessica Rosencrantz (M), 552 votes; Caroline Szyber (KD), 907 votes; Erik Ullenhag (FP), 679 votes; and Anders Ygeman (S), 266 votes.
- Levelling seats (party mandates) - Amineh Kakabaveh (V), 571 votes; Fredrik Malm (FP), 536 votes; and Désirée Pethrus (KD), 150 votes.

Permanent substitutions:

- Fredrik Reinfeldt (M) resigned on 31 December 2014 and was replaced by Dag Klackenberg (M) on 1 January 2015.
- Veronica Palm (S) resigned on 30 September 2015 and was replaced by Lawen Redar (S) on 1 October 2015.
- Erik Ullenhag (FP) resigned on 25 August 2016 and was replaced by Nina Lundström (FP) on the same day.
- Carin Jämtin (S) resigned on 28 May 2017 and was replaced by Börje Vestlund (S) on 29 May 2017.
- Åsa Romson (MP) resigned on 14 July 2017 and was replaced by Pernilla Stålhammar (MP) on 15 July 2017.
- Börje Vestlund (S) died on 22 September 2017 and was replaced by Teres Lindberg (S) on 25 September 2017.

===== 2010 =====
Results of the 2010 general election held on 19 September 2010:

Party		Votes per municipal electoral district						Total votes	%	Seats		
Party		Bromma– Kungs- holmen	Norr- malm– Öster- malm- Gamla Stan	Östra Söder- ort	Söder- malm– Enskede	Västra Söder- ort	Yttre Väster- ort	Total votes	%	Con.	Lev.	Tot.
Moderate Party	M	36,995	46,781	21,115	33,246	24,176	21,108	183,421	34.29%	10	0	10
Swedish Social Democratic Party	S	11,120	9,110	24,013	21,238	21,090	25,117	111,688	20.88%	6	0	6
Green Party	MP	9,377	7,993	11,667	18,531	11,509	6,274	65,351	12.22%	3	0	3
Liberal People's Party	FP	9,368	10,360	5,491	9,274	5,934	5,512	45,939	8.59%	2	1	3
Left Party	V	3,920	3,577	8,528	10,658	7,708	5,174	39,565	7.40%	2	0	2
Centre Party	C	7,548	9,247	3,240	7,240	3,964	2,656	33,895	6.34%	2	0	2
Christian Democrats	KD	6,063	7,883	3,040	4,407	3,235	3,616	28,244	5.28%	2	0	2
Sweden Democrats	SD	2,334	2,249	3,692	2,852	3,027	2,796	16,950	3.17%	1	0	1
Feminist Initiative	FI	691	791	757	1,614	881	267	5,001	0.93%	0	0	0
Pirate Party	PP	505	495	732	762	632	597	3,723	0.70%	0	0	0
Socialist Justice Party	RS	23	3	101	37	64	133	361	0.07%	0	0	0
Classical Liberal Party	KLP	17	25	18	27	9	14	110	0.02%	0	0	0
National Democrats	ND	7	13	33	8	14	25	100	0.02%	0	0	0
Unity	ENH	10	13	12	22	14	9	80	0.01%	0	0	0
Communist Party of Sweden	SKP	6	1	19	15	6	16	63	0.01%	0	0	0
Swedish Senior Citizen Interest Party	SPI	6	8	9	17	3	15	58	0.01%	0	0	0
European Workers Party	EAP	11	8	5	10	11	11	56	0.01%	0	0	0
Spirits Party		4	2	6	11	4	7	34	0.01%	0	0	0
Freedom Party		2	2	7	7	7	7	32	0.01%	0	0	0
Party of the Swedes	SVP	2	2	6	1	2	2	15	0.00%	0	0	0
Communist League	KommF	3	0	2	0	5	2	12	0.00%	0	0	0
Active Democracy		0	2	2	1	1	4	10	0.00%	0	0	0
Freedom of the Justice Party	S-FRP	2	2	0	1	0	3	8	0.00%	0	0	0
Norrländska Coalition	NorrS	1	1	1	2	1	0	6	0.00%	0	0	0
Rural Democrats		2	0	0	1	2	0	5	0.00%	0	0	0
Republican Party		1	0	0	1	0	2	4	0.00%	0	0	0
Rikshushållarna		0	0	0	2	0	0	2	0.00%	0	0	0
Health Care Party	Sjvåp	0	0	0	0	1	0	1	0.00%	0	0	0
Parties not on the ballot		18	23	31	27	25	29	153	0.03%	0	0	0
Valid votes		88,036	98,591	82,527	110,012	82,325	73,396	534,887	100.00%	28	1	29
Blank votes		630	510	791	858	638	521	3,948	0.73%			
Rejected votes – other		24	33	30	43	32	37	199	0.04%			
Total polled		88,690	99,134	83,348	110,913	82,995	73,954	539,034	84.96%			
Registered electors		99,982	112,620	101,336	126,319	99,133	95,074	634,464				
Turnout		88.71%	88.03%	82.25%	87.80%	83.72%	77.79%	84.96%				

The following candidates were elected:

- Constituency seats (personal mandates) - Göran Hägglund (KD), 3,873 votes; Fredrik Reinfeldt (M), 45,105 votes; Mona Sahlin (S), 26,410 votes; and Maria Wetterstrand (MP), 16,799 votes.
- Constituency seats (party mandates) - Maria Abrahamsson (M), 2,042 votes; Lena Adelsohn Liljeroth (M), 321 votes; Sofia Arkelsten (M), 551 votes; Beatrice Ask (M), 432 votes; Gustav Blix (M), 330 votes; Josefin Brink (V), 1,727 votes; Andreas Carlgren (C), 521 votes; Fredrick Federley (C), 1,456 votes; Johan Forssell (M), 322 votes; Robert Halef (KD), 128 votes; Arhe Hamednaca (S), 505 votes; Jens Holm (V), 504 votes; Mats Johansson (M), 52 votes; Ylva Johansson (S), 661 votes; Mehmet Kaplan (MP), 1,050 votes; Anna König Jerlmyr (M), 443 votes; David Lång (SD), 48 votes; Birgitta Ohlsson (FP), 3,571 votes; Veronica Palm (S), 851 votes; Åsa Romson (MP), 396 votes; Börje Vestlund (S), 185 votes; H. G. Wessberg (M), 79 votes; Barbro Westerholm (FP), 785 votes; and Anders Ygeman (S), 487 votes.
- Levelling seats (party mandates) - Carl B. Hamilton (FP), 567 votes.

Permanent substitutions:

- Anna König Jerlmyr (M) resigned on 19 October 2010 and was replaced by Jessica Rosencrantz (M) on the same day.
- H. G. Wessberg (M) resigned on 26 October 2010 and was replaced by Amir Adan (M) on the same day.
- Mona Sahlin (S) resigned on 31 March 2011 and was replaced by Teres Lindberg (S) on 1 April 2011.
- Maria Wetterstrand (MP) resigned on 15 September 2011 and was replaced by Per Bolund (MP) on 16 September 2011.
- Andreas Carlgren (C) resigned on 30 September 2011 and was replaced by Abir Al-Sahlani (C) on the same day.
- Fredrick Federley (C) resigned on 15 June 2014 upon being elected to the European Parliament and was replaced by Johan Hedin (C) on 16 June 2014.

==== 2000s ====
===== 2006 =====
Results of the 2006 general election held on 17 September 2006:

Party		Votes per municipal electoral district						Total votes	%	Seats		
Party		Bromma– Kungs- holmen	Norr- malm– Öster- malm- Gamla Stan	Östra Söder- ort	Söder- malm– Enskede	Västra Söder- ort	Yttre Väster- ort	Total votes	%	Con.	Lev.	Tot.
Moderate Party	M	34,758	45,996	17,067	32,382	19,407	19,601	169,211	35.07%	10	1	11
Swedish Social Democratic Party	S	12,587	10,063	23,084	23,868	19,323	22,840	111,765	23.17%	6	0	6
Liberal People's Party	FP	9,734	10,845	5,554	10,354	6,080	5,909	48,476	10.05%	3	0	3
Green Party	MP	6,293	6,020	7,107	13,697	7,069	4,844	45,030	9.33%	3	0	3
Left Party	V	3,653	3,164	7,027	10,109	6,249	5,414	35,616	7.38%	2	0	2
Centre Party	C	5,685	6,232	2,819	6,902	3,187	2,432	27,257	5.65%	2	0	2
Christian Democrats	KD	4,593	5,160	3,256	4,303	3,158	3,857	24,327	5.04%	1	0	1
Sweden Democrats	SD	973	895	1,736	1,422	1,485	1,401	7,912	1.64%	0	0	0
Feminist Initiative	FI	922	999	1,025	2,349	1,066	505	6,866	1.42%	0	0	0
Pirate Party	PP	339	341	467	558	402	409	2,516	0.52%	0	0	0
June List		201	231	251	292	196	228	1,399	0.29%	0	0	0
Swedish Senior Citizen Interest Party	SPI	84	70	165	136	101	88	644	0.13%	0	0	0
Unity	ENH	43	40	47	83	47	20	280	0.06%	0	0	0
Health Care Party	Sjvåp	26	16	44	54	50	56	246	0.05%	0	0	0
National Democrats	ND	23	16	68	30	50	54	241	0.05%	0	0	0
Socialist Justice Party	RS	2	4	48	23	29	32	138	0.03%	0	0	0
The Communists	KOMM	8	3	31	19	8	19	88	0.02%	0	0	0
National Socialist Front		6	12	20	12	24	6	80	0.02%	0	0	0
People's Will		10	7	10	20	14	11	72	0.01%	0	0	0
Unique Party		3	2	9	10	10	14	48	0.01%	0	0	0
Classical Liberal Party	KLP	5	8	1	5	5	3	27	0.01%	0	0	0
Freedom of the Justice Party	S-FRP	1	0	5	2	1	10	19	0.00%	0	0	0
European Workers Party	EAP	4	4	3	5	1	1	18	0.00%	0	0	0
New Future	NYF	3	3	6	4	0	1	17	0.00%	0	0	0
Communist League	KommF	1	0	4	4	3	3	15	0.00%	0	0	0
Kvinnokraft		0	5	0	2	0	1	8	0.00%	0	0	0
Active Democracy		0	0	0	2	1	1	4	0.00%	0	0	0
Partiet.se		0	0	0	0	1	3	4	0.00%	0	0	0
Democratic Party of New Swedes	DPNS	0	0	0	0	0	3	3	0.00%	0	0	0
Rikshushållarna		1	0	0	2	0	0	3	0.00%	0	0	0
Other parties		12	21	23	29	25	15	125	0.03%	0	0	0
Valid votes		79,970	90,157	69,877	106,678	67,992	67,781	482,455	100.00%	27	1	28
Blank votes		905	762	1,176	1,625	1,046	872	6,386	1.31%			
Rejected votes – other		18	29	26	32	28	31	164	0.03%			
Total polled		80,893	90,948	71,079	108,335	69,066	68,684	489,005	82.42%			
Registered electors		93,785	105,656	89,413	127,956	85,411	91,113	593,334				
Turnout		86.25%	86.08%	79.50%	84.67%	80.86%	75.38%	82.42%				

The following candidates were elected:

- Constituency seats (personal mandates) - Göran Hägglund (KD), 3,289 votes; Fredrik Reinfeldt (M), 37,971 votes; and Maria Wetterstrand (MP), 8,202 votes.
- Constituency seats (party mandates) - Lena Adelsohn Liljeroth (M), 526 votes; Beatrice Ask (M), 502 votes; Jan Björklund (FP), 2,213 votes; Fredrick Federley (C), 1,391 votes; Johan Forssell (M), 598 votes; Carl B. Hamilton (FP), 1,013 votes; Carin Jämtin (S), 4,999 votes; Mats Johansson (M), 92 votes; Mehmet Kaplan (MP), 1,171 votes; Anna König (M), 757 votes; Kalle Larsson (V), 354 votes; Anna Lilliehöök (M), 103 votes; Sylvia Lindgren (S), 571 votes; Mats G. Nilsson (M), 182 votes; Sten Nordin (M), 273 votes; Mikael Odenberg (M), 138 votes; Birgitta Ohlsson (FP), 2,582 votes; Veronica Palm (S), 1,159 votes; Nikos Papadopoulos (S), 601 votes; Bosse Ringholm (S), 3,818 votes; Åsa Romson (MP), 368 votes; Solveig Ternström (C), 1,177 votes; Anders Ygeman (S), 547 votes; and Pernilla Zethraeus (V), 447 votes.
- Levelling seats (party mandates) - Sebastian Cederschiöld (M), 134 votes.

Permanent substitutions:

- Sebastian Cederschiöld (M) resigned on 3 October 2006 and was replaced by Gustav Blix (M) on the same day.
- Åsa Romson (MP) resigned on 3 October 2006 and was replaced by Per Bolund (MP) on the same day.
- Johan Forssell (M) resigned on 15 November 2006 and was replaced by Helena Rivière (M) on 16 November 2006.
- Carin Jämtin (S) resigned on 21 December 2006 and was replaced by Börje Vestlund (S) on 22 December 2006.
- Mikael Odenberg (M) resigned on 17 September 2007 and was replaced by Sofia Arkelsten (M) on 18 September 2007.
- Sten Nordin (M) resigned on 7 May 2008 and was replaced by Reza Khelili Dylami (M) on 8 May 2008.
- Pernilla Zethraeus (V) resigned on 17 June 2008 and was replaced by Amineh Kakabaveh (V) on 18 June 2008.

===== 2002 =====
Results of the 2002 general election held on 15 September 2002:

Party		Votes per municipal electoral district							Total votes	%	Seats		
Party		Bromma– Kungs- holmen	Norr- malm– Öster- malm- Gamla Stan	Östra Söder- ort	Söder- malm– Enskede	Västra Söder- ort	Yttre Väster- ort	Unreg- istered voters	Total votes	%	Con.	Lev.	Tot.
Swedish Social Democratic Party	S	17,333	15,676	29,709	28,469	24,746	25,690	2,017	143,640	31.36%	9	0	9
Moderate Party	M	19,801	29,060	9,474	14,456	10,031	10,928	2,455	96,205	21.01%	6	1	7
Liberal People's Party	FP	18,369	22,339	9,960	16,564	10,597	10,160	1,521	89,510	19.54%	5	1	6
Left Party	V	5,217	5,302	9,293	13,488	8,478	7,150	867	49,795	10.87%	3	0	3
Green Party	MP	4,563	4,957	5,065	7,956	4,304	3,403	779	31,027	6.77%	2	0	2
Christian Democrats	KD	5,670	6,239	4,410	4,452	4,016	4,840	601	30,228	6.60%	2	0	2
Centre Party	C	1,503	1,401	1,088	1,609	1,128	1,202	178	8,109	1.77%	0	0	0
Sweden Democrats	SD	631	634	916	721	937	810	57	4,706	1.03%	0	0	0
Swedish Senior Citizen Interest Party	SPI	277	299	417	363	259	266	30	1,911	0.42%	0	0	0
National Democrats	ND	108	81	232	131	147	145	7	851	0.19%	0	0	0
Socialist Party	SOC.P	38	15	79	94	155	47	3	431	0.09%	0	0	0
Socialist Justice Party	RS	9	11	134	29	39	150	8	380	0.08%	0	0	0
The Communists	KOMM	25	6	42	37	38	39	3	190	0.04%	0	0	0
Free List		24	38	23	43	10	7	6	151	0.03%	0	0	0
Unity	ENH	25	16	8	17	18	14	1	99	0.02%	0	0	0
New Future	NYF	8	10	33	5	9	16	0	81	0.02%	0	0	0
Norrbotten Party	NBP	11	13	18	15	6	9	0	72	0.02%	0	0	0
Welfare Party	VALFP	2	3	4	3	2	55	1	70	0.02%	0	0	0
European Workers Party	EAP	10	4	10	16	12	8	0	60	0.01%	0	0	0
Civic Party		5	5	2	13	1	0	0	26	0.01%	0	0	0
Communist League	KommF	2	0	5	0	8	0	1	16	0.00%	0	0	0
Sports Party	IdroP	0	1	3	1	0	0	0	5	0.00%	0	0	0
Rikshushållarna	Riksh	1	0	0	3	0	0	0	4	0.00%	0	0	0
Preschool Party – Children's Voice		1	0	0	2	0	0	0	3	0.00%	0	0	0
The Tax Reformists	Sref	0	0	0	0	1	0	2	3	0.00%	0	0	0
New Swedes	DPNS	0	0	0	0	0	1	0	1	0.00%	0	0	0
Beach Protection Party	SSKP	0	0	0	0	0	1	0	1	0.00%	0	0	0
Other parties		69	56	81	72	83	51	18	430	0.09%	0	0	0
Valid votes		73,702	86,166	71,006	88,559	65,025	64,992	8,555	458,005	100.00%	27	2	29
Rejected votes		760	762	938	1,143	825	698	122	5,248	1.13%			
Total polled		74,462	86,928	71,944	89,702	65,850	65,690	8,677	463,253	80.72%			
Registered electors		90,929	106,582	93,085	110,952	84,962	87,426		573,936				
Turnout		81.89%	81.56%	77.29%	80.85%	77.51%	75.14%		80.72%				

The following candidates were elected:

- Constituency seats (party mandates) - Lena Adelsohn Liljeroth (M), 2,990 votes; Beatrice Ask (M), 2,251 votes; Stefan Attefall (KD), 87 votes; Gunilla Carlsson (M), 4,271 votes; Joe Frans (S), 341 votes; Gustav Fridolin (MP), 1,414 votes; Maria Hassan (S), 848 votes; Ulla Hoffmann (V), 109 votes; Helena Höij (KD), 69 votes; Gunnar Hökmark (M), 1,736 votes; Henrik S. Järrel (M), 438 votes; Bo Könberg (FP), 2,524 votes; Kalle Larsson (V), 281 votes; Sylvia Lindgren (S), 1,043 votes; Ana Maria Narti (FP), 922 votes; Mikael Odenberg (M), 293 votes; Birgitta Ohlsson (FP), 3,109 votes; Lars Ohly (V), 761 votes; Veronica Palm (S), 1,390 votes; Nikos Papadopoulos (S), 1,451 votes; Bosse Ringholm (S), 8,088 votes; Gabriel Romanus (FP), 449 votes; Yvonne Ruwaida (MP), 580 votes; Nyamko Sabuni (FP), 2,143 votes; Inger Segelström (S), 1,500 votes; Börje Vestlund (S), 306 votes; and Anders Ygeman (S), 427 votes.
- Levelling seats (party mandates) - Anna Lilliehöök (M), 213 votes; and Mauricio Rojas (FP), 3,225 votes.

Permanent substitutions:

- Inger Segelström (S) resigned on 19 July 2004 upon being elected to the European Parliament and was replaced by Inger Nordlander (S) on 20 July 2004.
- Gunnar Hökmark (M) resigned on 19 July 2004 upon being elected to the European Parliament and was replaced by Carl-Erik Skårman (M) on 20 July 2004.
- Bo Könberg (FP) resigned on 31 December 2005 and was replaced by Louise Edlind Friberg (FP) on 1 January 2006.

==== 1990s ====
===== 1998 =====
Results of the 1998 general election held on 20 September 1998:

Party		Votes	%	Seats		
Party		Votes	%	Con.	Lev.	Tot.
Moderate Party	M	147,599	33.68%	9	1	10
Swedish Social Democratic Party	S	119,270	27.21%	7	0	7
Left Party	V	56,663	12.93%	4	0	4
Christian Democrats	KD	39,100	8.92%	2	1	3
Liberal People's Party	FP	33,027	7.54%	2	0	2
Green Party	MP	24,362	5.56%	2	0	2
Centre Party	C	7,493	1.71%	0	0	0
Other parties		10,781	2.46%	0	0	0
Valid votes		438,295	100.00%	26	2	28
Rejected votes		8,668	1.94%			
Total polled		446,963	80.96%			
Registered electors		552,045				

The following candidates were elected:

- Constituency seats (personal mandates) - Carl Bildt (M), 42,303 votes; Gudrun Schyman (V), 15,065 votes; and Barbro Westerholm (FP), 2,664 votes.
- Constituency seats (party mandates) - Rolf Åbjörnsson (KD), 534 votes; Beatrice Ask (M), 577 votes; Stefan Attefall (KD), 59 votes; Nalin Baksi (S), 4,896 votes; Mats Einarsson (V), 102 votes; Elisabeth Fleetwood (M), 189 votes; Carl Erik Hedlund (M), 101 votes; Henrik S. Järrel (M), 260 votes; Ingemar Josefsson (S), 684 votes; Ulf Kristersson (M), 512 votes; Bo Könberg (FP), 2,524 votes; Ewa Larsson (MP), 277 votes; Roland Larsson (S), 261 votes; Sylvia Lindgren (S), 723 votes; Mikael Odenberg (M), 150 votes; Lars Ohly (V), 1,145 votes; Yvonne Ruwaida (MP), 783 votes; Pierre Schori (S), 5,479 votes; Inger Segelström (S), 1,181 votes; Carl-Erik Skårman (M), 210 votes; Birgitta Wistrand (M), 155 votes; Anders Ygeman (S), 292 votes; and Eva Zetterberg (V), 673 votes.
- Levelling seats (party mandates) - Helena Höij (KD), 181 votes; and Anna Lilliehöök (M), 278 votes.

Permanent substitutions:

- Roland Larsson (S) resigned on 2 February 1999 and was replaced by Tullia von Sydow (S) on 3 February 1999.
- Pierre Schori (S) resigned on 14 June 1999 and was replaced by Nikos Papadopoulos (S) on 15 June 1999.
- Barbro Westerholm (FP) resigned on 1 October 1999 and was replaced by Olle Wästberg (FP) on the same day.
- Olle Wästberg (FP) resigned on 1 October 1999 and was replaced by Ana Maria Narti (FP) on the same day.
- Ulf Kristersson (M) resigned on 30 April 2000 and was replaced by Margareta Cederfelt (M) on 1 May 2000.
- Carl Bildt (M) resigned on 18 September 2001 and was replaced by Anna Kinberg (M) on the same day.

===== 1994 =====
Results of the 1994 general election held on 18 September 1994:

Party		Votes	%	Seats		
Party		Votes	%	Con.	Lev.	Tot.
Swedish Social Democratic Party	S	152,722	34.83%	9	0	9
Moderate Party	M	140,982	32.16%	8	0	8
Liberal People's Party	FP	44,707	10.20%	3	0	3
Left Party	V	36,768	8.39%	2	0	2
Green Party	MP	25,595	5.84%	1	1	2
Centre Party	C	13,996	3.19%	1	0	1
Christian Democratic Unity	KDS	13,303	3.03%	1	0	1
New Democracy	NyD	5,641	1.29%	0	0	0
Other parties		4,718	1.08%	0	0	0
Valid votes		438,432	100.00%	25	1	26
Rejected votes		7,329	1.64%			
Total polled		445,761	85.37%			
Registered electors		522,122				

The following candidates were elected: Beatrice Ask (M); Nalin Baksi (S); Carl Bildt (M); Hadar Cars (FP); Charlotte Cederschiöld (M); Elisabeth Fleetwood (M); Birgit Friggebo (FP); Mats Hellström (S); Olof Johansson (C); Ingemar Josefsson (S); Ulf Kristersson (M); Kenneth Kvist (V); Ewa Larsson (MP); Sylvia Lindgren (S); Bengt Lindqvist (S); Sven-Åke Nygårds (S); Mikael Odenberg (M); Kristina Persson (S); Mona Sahlin (S); Krister Skånberg (MP); Michael Stjernström (KDS); Maj Britt Theorin (S); Margaretha af Ugglas (M); Barbro Westerholm (FP); Birgitta Wistrand (M); and Eva Zetterberg (V).

Permanent substitutions:

- Krister Skånberg (MP) resigned on 19 October 1994 and was replaced by Eva Goës (MP) on 20 October 1994.
- Kristina Persson (S) resigned on 31 July 1995 and was replaced by Juan Fonseca (S) on 1 August 1995.
- Hadar Cars (FP) resigned on 8 October 1995 and was replaced by Bo Könberg (FP) on 9 October 1995.
- Maj Britt Theorin (S) resigned on 8 October 1995 and was replaced by Inger Segelström (S) on 9 October 1995.
- Margaretha af Ugglas (M) resigned on 8 October 1995 and was replaced by Henrik S. Järrel (M) on 9 October 1995.
- Charlotte Cederschiöld (M) resigned on 9 October 1995 and was replaced by Carl Erik Hedlund (M) on 10 October 1995.
- Bengt Lindqvist (S) resigned on 31 December 1995 and was replaced by Anders Ygeman (S) on 1 January 1996.
- Mona Sahlin (S) resigned on 15 April 1996 and was replaced by Kristina Nordström (S) on the same day.
- Mats Hellström (S) resigned on 31 July 1996 and was replaced by Nikos Papadopoulos (S) on 1 August 1996.
- Birgit Friggebo (FP) resigned on 31 December 1997 and was replaced by Anders Johnson (FP) on 1 January 1998.

===== 1991 =====
Results of the 1991 general election held on 15 September 1991:

Party		Votes	%	Seats		
Party		Votes	%	Con.	Lev.	Tot.
Moderate Party	M	133,141	30.73%	8	1	9
Swedish Social Democratic Party	S	129,108	29.80%	8	0	8
Liberal People's Party	FP	49,510	11.43%	3	0	3
Left Party	V	30,956	7.15%	2	0	2
New Democracy	NyD	29,485	6.81%	2	0	2
Green Party	MP	22,979	5.30%	0	0	0
Christian Democratic Unity	KDS	21,233	4.90%	1	0	1
Centre Party	C	12,656	2.92%	1	0	1
Other parties		4,132	0.95%	0	0	0
Valid votes		433,200	100.00%	25	1	26
Rejected votes		7,782	1.76%			
Total polled		440,982	85.70%			
Registered electors		514,562				

The following candidates were elected: Sten Andersson (S); Göran Åstrand (M); Carl Bildt (M); Kent Carlsson (S); Charlotte Cederschiöld (M); Jerzy Einhorn (KDS); Dan Eriksson (NyD); Barbro Evermo Palmerlund (S); Elisabeth Fleetwood (M); Filip Fridolfsson (M); Birgit Friggebo (FP); Anita Gradin (S); Mats Hellström (S); Henrik S. Järrel (M); Bo G. Jenevall (NyD); Olof Johansson (C); Oskar Lindkvist (S); Anita Modin (S); Mikael Odenberg (M); Maj Britt Theorin (S); Margaretha af Ugglas (M); Lars Werner (V); Barbro Westerholm (FP); Jan-Erik Wikström (FP); Birgitta Wistrand (M); and Eva Zetterberg (V).

Permanent substitutions:

- Jan-Erik Wikström (FP) resigned on 30 June 1992 and was replaced by Hadar Cars (FP) on 1 July 1992.
- Anita Modin (S) resigned on 5 October 1992 and was replaced by Lars Ulander (S) on 6 October 1992.
- Anita Gradin (S) resigned on 31 October 1992 and was replaced by Sylvia Lindgren (S) on 1 November 1992.
- Barbro Evermo Palmerlund (S) resigned on 4 October 1993 and was replaced by Bengt Lindqvist (S) on 6 October 1993.
- Kent Carlsson (S) resigned on 30 October 1993 and was replaced by Kristina Persson (S) on 1 November 1993.

==== 1980s ====
===== 1988 =====
Results of the 1988 general election held on 18 September 1988:

Party		Votes	%	Seats		
Party		Votes	%	Con.	Lev.	Tot.
Swedish Social Democratic Party	S	145,524	33.65%	8	2	10
Moderate Party	M	119,567	27.65%	7	1	8
Liberal People's Party	FP	62,511	14.45%	4	1	5
Left Party – Communists	VPK	44,339	10.25%	3	1	4
Green Party	MP	29,894	6.91%	2	0	2
Centre Party	C	18,195	4.21%	1	0	1
Christian Democratic Unity	KDS	7,834	1.81%	0	0	0
Other parties		4,626	1.07%	0	0	0
Valid votes		432,490	100.00%	25	5	30
Rejected votes		6,627	1.51%			
Total polled		439,117	84.65%			
Registered electors		518,730				

The following candidates were elected: Monica Andersson (S); Sten Andersson (S); Beatrice Ask (M); Göran Åstrand (M); Carl Bildt (M); Gösta Bohman (M); Hadar Cars (FP); Charlotte Cederschiöld (M); Åsa Domeij (MP); Elisabeth Fleetwood (M); Filip Fridolfsson (M); Birgit Friggebo (FP); Anita Gradin (S); Pär Granstedt (C); Bo Hammar (VPK); Mats Hellström (S); Margó Ingvardsson (VPK); Ylva Johansson (VPK); Maria Leissner (FP); Jill Lindgren (MP); Oskar Lindkvist (S); Bengt Lindqvist (S); Anita Modin (S); Gertrud Sigurdsen (S); Maj Britt Theorin (S); Margaretha af Ugglas (M); Lars Ulander (S); Lars Werner (VPK); Barbro Westerholm (FP); and Jan-Erik Wikström (FP).

Permanent substitutions:

- Beatrice Ask (M) resigned on 27 October 1988 and was replaced by Göran Ericsson (M) on 28 October 1988.
- Monica Andersson (S) resigned on 31 October 1988 and was replaced by Sven-Åke Nygårds (M) on 8 November 1988.
- Jill Lindgren (MP) died on 6 May 1989 and was replaced by Krister Skånberg (MP) on 10 May 1989.

===== 1985 =====
Results of the 1985 general election held on 15 September 1985:

Party		Votes	%	Seats		
Party		Votes	%	Con.	Lev.	Tot.
Swedish Social Democratic Party	S	172,352	38.04%	10	1	11
Moderate Party	M	136,899	30.21%	8	1	9
Liberal People's Party	FP	71,639	15.81%	4	1	5
Left Party – Communists	VPK	43,384	9.57%	2	1	3
Centre Party	C	16,745	3.70%	1	0	1
Green Party	MP	7,870	1.74%	0	0	0
Other parties		4,228	0.93%	0	0	0
Valid votes		453,117	100.00%	25	4	29
Rejected votes		4,724	1.03%			
Total polled		457,841	88.78%			
Registered electors		515,701				

The following candidates were elected: Ulf Adelsohn (M); Monica Andersson (S); Sivert Andersson (S); Sten Andersson (S); Margareta Andrén (FP); Carl Bildt (M); Lennart Blom (M); Gösta Bohman (M); Hadar Cars (FP); Göran Ericsson (M); Elisabeth Fleetwood (M); Filip Fridolfsson (M); Birgit Friggebo (FP); Anita Gradin (S); Bo Hammar (VPK); Mats Hellström (S); Margó Ingvardsson (VPK); Olof Johansson (C); Maria Leissner (FP); Oskar Lindkvist (S); Blenda Littmarck (M); Anita Modin (S); Olof Palme (S); Gertrud Sigurdsen (S); Maj Britt Theorin (S); Margaretha af Ugglas (M); Lars Ulander (S); Lars Werner (VPK); and Jan-Erik Wikström (FP).

Permanent substitutions:

- Olof Palme (S) was assassinated on 28 February 1986 and was replaced by Barbro Evermo (S) on 3 March 1986.
- Sivert Andersson (S) resigned on 4 November 1986 and was replaced by Stig Gustafsson (S) on 5 November 1986.

===== 1982 =====
Results of the 1982 general election held on 19 September 1982:

Party		Votes	%	Seats		
Party		Votes	%	Con.	Lev.	Tot.
Swedish Social Democratic Party	S	178,565	39.37%	10	2	12
Moderate Party	M	152,817	33.69%	9	2	11
Left Party – Communists	VPK	45,737	10.08%	3	1	4
Centre Party	C	33,062	7.29%	2	0	2
Liberal People's Party	FP	26,721	5.89%	2	0	2
Green Party	MP	10,021	2.21%	0	0	0
Christian Democratic Unity	KDS	4,371	0.96%	0	0	0
K-Party	K-P	545	0.12%	0	0	0
Other parties		1,696	0.37%	0	0	0
Valid votes		453,535	100.00%	26	5	31
Rejected votes		5,997	1.31%			
Total polled		459,532	89.99%			
Registered electors		510,638				

The following candidates were elected: Ulf Adelsohn (M); Karin Andersson (C); Sivert Andersson (S); Sten Andersson (S); Carl Bildt (M); Lennart Blom (M); Gösta Bohman (M); Göran Ericsson (M); Elisabeth Fleetwood (M); Tommy Franzén (VPK); Filip Fridolfsson (M); Anita Gradin (S); Stig Gustafsson (S); Mats Hellström (S); C.-H. Hermansson (VPK); Eva Hjelmström (VPK); Olof Johansson (C); H. Bertil Lidgard (M); Oskar Lindkvist (S); Blenda Littmarck (M); Anita Modin (S); Barbro Nilsson (M); Karin Nordlander (VPK); Olof Palme (S); Gertrud Sigurdsen (S); Maj Britt Theorin (S); Margaretha af Ugglas (M); Lars Ulander (S); Ola Ullsten (FP); Jan-Erik Wikström (FP); and Bertil Zachrisson (S).

Permanent substitutions:

- Bertil Zachrisson (S) resigned on 10 January 1983 and was replaced by Monica Andersson (S) on 11 January 1983.
- Karin Nordlander (VPK) resigned on 14 October 1983 and was replaced by Margó Ingvardsson (VPK) on 15 October 1983.
- Ola Ullsten (FP) resigned on 2 October 1984 and was replaced by Bengt Westerberg (FP) on 3 October 1984.
- H. Bertil Lidgard (M) died on 26 December 1984 and was replaced by Peggy Lagerström (M) on 7 January 1985.
- Peggy Lagerström (M) resigned on 8 January 1985 and was replaced by Axel Wennerholm (M) on 10 January 1985.

==== 1970s ====
===== 1979 =====
Results of the 1979 general election held on 16 September 1979:

Party		Votes	%	Seats		
Party		Votes	%	Con.	Lev.	Tot.
Swedish Social Democratic Party	S	171,474	37.83%	10	1	11
Moderate Party	M	132,224	29.17%	8	1	9
Liberal People's Party	FP	53,261	11.75%	3	1	4
Left Party – Communists	VPK	47,513	10.48%	3	1	4
Centre Party	C	40,676	8.97%	2	1	3
Christian Democratic Unity	KDS	3,483	0.77%	0	0	0
Communist Party of Sweden	SKP	2,000	0.44%	0	0	0
Workers' Party – The Communists	APK	900	0.20%	0	0	0
Other parties		1,756	0.39%	0	0	0
Valid votes		453,287	100.00%	26	5	31
Rejected votes		4,006	0.88%			
Total polled		457,293	89.02%			
Registered electors		513,669				

The following candidates were elected: Karin Andersson (C); Sivert Andersson (S); Sten Andersson (S); Carl Bildt (M); Lennart Blom (M); Gösta Bohman (M); Anna Eliasson (C); Elisabeth Fleetwood (M); Tommy Franzén (VPK); Birgit Friggebo (FP); Anita Gradin (S); Mats Hellström (S); C.-H. Hermansson (VPK); Allan Hernelius (M); Eva Hjelmström (VPK); Olof Johansson (C); H. Bertil Lidgard (M); Oskar Lindkvist (S); Blenda Littmarck (M); Karin Nordlander (VPK); Olof Palme (S); Sixten Pettersson (M); Ingrid Segerström (S); Gertrud Sigurdsen (S); Maj Britt Theorin (S); Margaretha af Ugglas (M); Lars Ulander (S); Ola Ullsten (FP); Olle Wästberg (FP); Jan-Erik Wikström (FP); and Bertil Zachrisson (S).

Permanent substitutions:

- Sixten Pettersson (M) resigned on 28 February 1982 and was replaced by Filip Fridolfsson (M) on 1 March 1982.

===== 1976 =====
Results of the 1976 general election held on 19 September 1976:

Party		Votes	%	Seats		
Party		Votes	%	Con.	Lev.	Tot.
Swedish Social Democratic Party	S	179,710	38.15%	10	2	12
Moderate Party	M	116,787	24.79%	7	1	8
People's Party	F	62,680	13.31%	4	0	4
Centre Party	C	62,543	13.28%	4	0	4
Left Party – Communists	VPK	41,542	8.82%	2	2	4
Christian Democratic Unity	KDS	3,642	0.77%	0	0	0
Communist Party of Sweden	SKP	3,457	0.73%	0	0	0
Other parties		709	0.15%	0	0	0
Valid votes		471,070	100.00%	27	5	32
Rejected votes		2,343	0.49%			
Total polled		473,413	90.35%			
Registered electors		523,983				

The following candidates were elected: Per Ahlmark (F); Karin Ahrland (F); Karin Andersson (C); Sivert Andersson (S); Sten Andersson (S); Gösta Bohman (M); Ingrid Diesen (M); Anna Eliasson (C); Barbro Engman (S); Tommy Franzén (VPK); Filip Fridolfsson (M); Anita Gradin (S); Mats Hellström (S); C.-H. Hermansson (VPK); Allan Hernelius (M); Eva Hjelmström (VPK); Knut Johansson (S); Olof Johansson (C); Astrid Kristensson (M); H. Bertil Lidgard (M); Oskar Lindkvist (S); Karin Nordlander (VPK); Olof Palme (S); Gertrud Sigurdsen (S); Bengt Sjönell (C); Maj Britt Theorin (S); Inga Thorsson (S); Margaretha af Ugglas (M); Ola Ullsten (F); Anders Wijkman (M); Jan-Erik Wikström (F); and Bertil Zachrisson (S).

Permanent substitutions:

- Astrid Kristensson (M) resigned on 4 October 1977 and was replaced by Blenda Littmarck (M) on 5 October 1977.
- Per Ahlmark (F) resigned on 31 December 1978 and was replaced by Olle Wästberg (F) on 1 January 1979.

===== 1973 =====
Results of the 1973 general election held on 16 September 1973:

Party		Votes	%	Seats		
Party		Votes	%	Con.	Lev.	Tot.
Swedish Social Democratic Party	S	184,758	39.36%	12	1	13
Moderate Party	M	109,549	23.34%	7	1	8
Centre Party	C	69,687	14.85%	4	1	5
People's Party	F	52,728	11.23%	3	1	4
Left Party – Communists	VPK	43,196	9.20%	3	1	4
Christian Democratic Unity	KDS	4,627	0.99%	0	0	0
Communist Party of Sweden	SKP	3,942	0.84%	0	0	0
Communist League Marxist–Leninists (the revolutionaries)	KFML(r)	633	0.13%	0	0	0
Other parties		266	0.06%	0	0	0
Valid votes		469,386	100.00%	29	5	34
Rejected votes		1,218	0.26%			
Total polled		470,604	89.16%			
Registered electors		527,792				

The following candidates were elected: Per Ahlmark (F); Karin Andersson (C); Sivert Andersson (S); Sten Andersson (S); Kerstin Anér (F); Gösta Bohman (M); Ingrid Diesen (M); Anna Eliasson (C); Filip Fridolfsson (M); Lennart Geijer (S); Anita Gradin (S); Gunnar Hedlund (C); Gunnar Helén (F); Mats Hellström (S); C.-H. Hermansson (VPK); Allan Hernelius (M); Knut Johansson (S); Olof Johansson (C); Astrid Kristensson (M); H. Bertil Lidgard (M); Oskar Lindkvist (S); Torsten Nilsson (S); Karin Nordlander (VPK); Sune Olsson (VPK); Olof Palme (S); Gertrud Sigurdsen (S); Bengt Sjönell (C); John Takman (VPK); Maj Britt Theorin (S); Inga Thorsson (S); Margaretha af Ugglas (M); Ola Ullsten (F); Anders Wijkman (M); and Bertil Zachrisson (S).

Permanent substitutions:

- Gunnar Helén (F) resigned on 10 January 1976 and was replaced by Jan-Erik Wikström (F) on the same day.

===== 1970 =====
Results of the 1970 general election held on 20 September 1970:

Party		Votes	%	Seats		
Party		Votes	%	Con.	Lev.	Tot.
Swedish Social Democratic Party	S	208,967	42.57%	14	1	15
People's Party	F	103,170	21.02%	7	0	7
Moderate Party	M	82,152	16.74%	5	1	6
Centre Party	C	49,183	10.02%	3	1	4
Left Party – Communists	VPK	36,084	7.35%	2	2	4
Christian Democratic Unity	KDS	5,869	1.20%	0	0	0
Communist League Marxists-Leninists	KFML	5,311	1.08%	0	0	0
Other parties		148	0.03%	0	0	0
Valid votes		490,884	100.00%	31	5	36
Rejected votes		1,286	0.26%			
Total polled		492,170	86.44%			
Registered electors		569,357				

The following candidates were elected: Per Ahlmark (F); Karin Andersson (C); Sten Andersson (S); Kerstin Anér (F); Gösta Bohman (M); Olle Dahlén (F); Anna Eliasson (C); Nancy Eriksson (S); Lennart Geijer (S); Anita Gradin (S); Hans Hagnell (S); Gunnar Helén (F); Mats Hellström (S); C.-H. Hermansson (VPK); Allan Hernelius (M); Yngve Holmberg (M); Knut Johansson (S); Olof Johansson (C); Astrid Kristensson (M); H. Bertil Lidgard (M); Oskar Lindkvist (S); Torsten Nilsson (S); Karin Nordlander (VPK); Sune Olsson (VPK); Olof Palme (S); Yngve Persson (S); Gertrud Sigurdsen (S); Bengt Sjönell (C); John Takman (VPK); Maj Britt Theorin (S); Inga Thorsson (S); Ola Ullsten (F); Anders Wijkman (M); Daniel Wiklund (F); Jan-Erik Wikström (F); and Bertil Zachrisson (S).

Permanent substitutions:

- Yngve Holmberg (M) resigned on 16 October 1972 and was replaced by Filip Fridolfsson (M) on 17 October 1972.
