= Vepsä =

Vepsä is a surname. Notable people with the surname include:

- Mattias Vepsä (born 1980), Swedish politician
- Ritva Vepsä (1941–2016), Finnish actress
