= Joe Frans =

Joe Frans may refer to:

- Joe Frans (curler) (born 1975), Canadian curler
- Joe Frans (politician) (born 1963), Swedish politician
