= Ulrika Westerlund =

Swedish politician (born 1972)

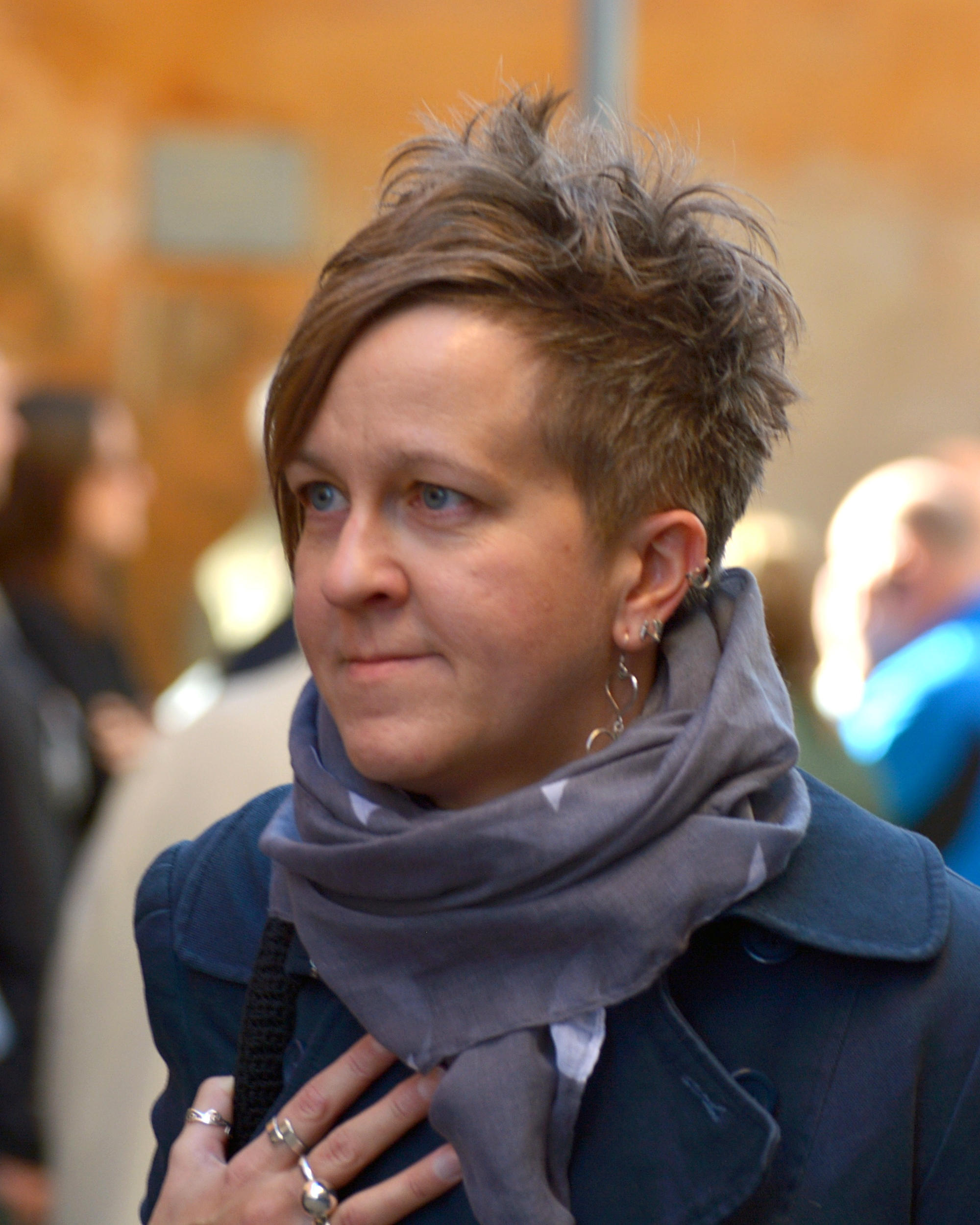
- Westerlund in 2014

Member of the Riksdag
- Incumbent
- Assumed office 26 September 2022
- Constituency: Stockholm Municipality

Personal details
- Born: 1972 (age 53–54)
- Party: Green Party

Ulrika Westerlund (born 1972) is a Swedish politician. She was elected as Member of the Riksdag in September 2022. She represents the constituency of Stockholm Municipality. She is affiliated with the Green Party.
