= Daniel Vencu Velasquez Castro =

Swedish politician (born 1994)

- Vencu Velasquez Castro in May 2025

Member of the Riksdag
- Incumbent
- Assumed office 26 September 2022
- Constituency: Stockholm Municipality

Personal details
- Born: Daniel Agustin Vencu Velasquez Castro; 1994 (age 31–32)
- Party: Social Democratic Party

Daniel Agustin Vencu Velasquez Castro (born 1994) is a Swedish politician and member of the Riksdag, the national legislature. A member of the Social Democratic Party, he has represented Stockholm Municipality since September 2022. He is a member of the municipal council in Stockholm Municipality.

== Personal life ==
Born in Sweden, Vencu Velasquez Castro is of Chilean descent. He is openly gay.
