= Johan Tireland =

Swedish politician (born 1988)

Member of the Riksdag
- Incumbent
- Assumed office 28 September 2026
- Constituency: Stockholm Municipality

Personal details
- Born: 23 June 1988 (age 38)
- Party: Sweden Democrats

Johan Erik George Tireland (born 23 June 1988) is a Swedish politician who was elected member of the Riksdag in 2026. He has served as chairman of the Sweden Democrats in Stockholm Municipality since 2023.
