= Malin Björk (Centre Party politician) =

Swedish politician (born 1969)

Member of the Riksdag
- Incumbent
- Assumed office 2021
- Constituency: Stockholm Municipality

Personal details
- Born: 1969 (age 56–57)
- Party: Centre

Malin Björk (born 1969) is a Swedish Centre Party politician and has been a member of the Riksdag since 2021. Originally only elected as a substitute, she became an ordinary member for Stockholm Municipality following the resignation of Johanna Paarup-Jönsson in September 2021.
