= Johanna Jönsson =

Swedish politician

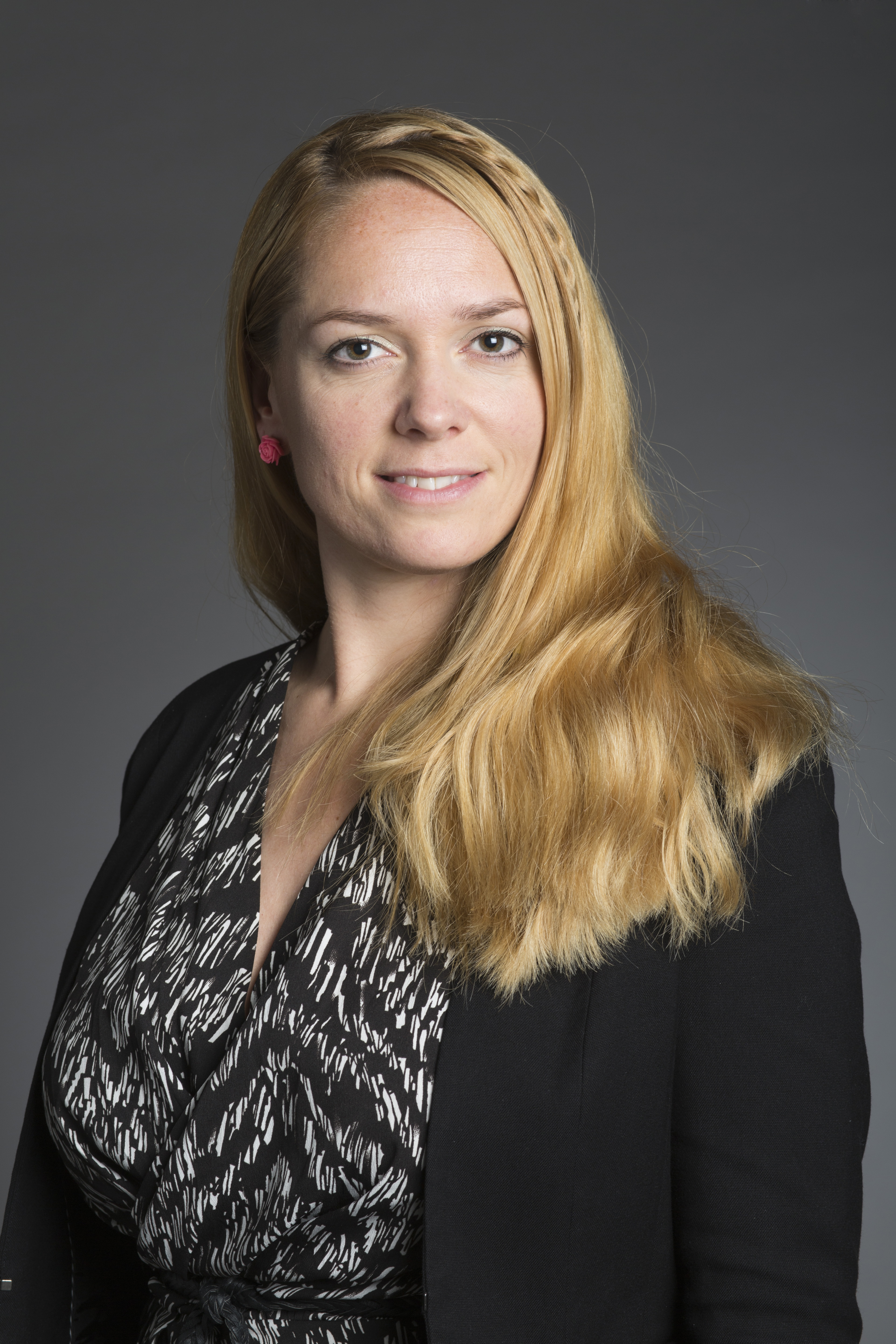
- Johanna Jönsson in 2013

Member of the Riksdag
- In office 2014–2021
- Constituency: Stockholm Municipality

Personal details
- Born: Johanna Matilda Jönsson; December 24, 1982 (age 42); Härnösand, Sweden
- Political party: Centre Party

Johanna Matilda Paarup-Jönsson (née Jönsson; born 24 December 1982) is a Swedish politician from the Centre Party who was a member of the Riksdag from 2014 to 2021 for Stockholm Municipality constituency.

== See also ==
- List of members of the Riksdag, 2014–2018
- List of members of the Riksdag, 2018–2022
