= Emanuel Öz =

Swedish politician (born 1979)

Member of the Riksdag
- In office 29 September 2014 – 24 September 2018
- Constituency: Stockholm Municipality

Personal details
- Born: Emanuel Öz; 1979 (age 46–47)
- Party: Social Democratic Party
- Education: Stockholm University

Emanuel Öz (born 1979) is a Swedish politician, lawyer and former member of the Riksdag, the national legislature. A member of the Social Democratic Party, he represented Stockholm Municipality between September 2014 and September 2018.

Öz is the son of Selim Öz and nurse Terzo Öz. He was educated in Tensta. He has a Bachelor of Laws degree from Stockholm University. He has been practising law since 2006.
