= Sophia Granswed Baat =

Swedish politician (born 1986)

Member of the Riksdag
- Incumbent
- Assumed office 28 September 2026
- Constituency: Stockholm Municipality

Personal details
- Born: 1986 (age 39–40) Köping, Sweden
- Party: Moderate Party
- Education: Uppsala University; Lund University

Sophia Granswed Baat (born 1986) is a Swedish politician from the Moderate Party. She has been a serving deputy member in the Riksdag since 2026, elected for the Stockholm Municipality constituency.

== Biography ==
Granswed Baat was born in Köping and grew up in Arboga. She has at least three years of post-secondary education and has worked as a Public Affairs Manager.

She received her first political assignment for the Moderate Party in 2010, when she became a board member of Stockholm Vatten. Granswed Baat has since been active in municipal politics in Stockholm Municipality and has been a member of the Stockholm City Council.

In the 2026 Swedish general election, Granswed Baat ran for the Moderate Party in the Stockholm Municipality constituency. From 28 September 2026, she serves as a substitute in the Riksdag for Jessica Rosencrantz.

== See also ==
- List of members of the Riksdag, 2026–2030
