= Ida Gabrielsson =

Swedish politician (born 1981)

- Gabrielsson in 2026

Member of the Riksdag
- Incumbent
- Assumed office 24 September 2018
- Constituency: Stockholm Municipality (2022–present); Stockholm County (2018–2022)

Personal details
- Born: 19 November 1981 (age 44)
- Party: Left

Ida Gabrielsson (born 19 November 1981) is a Swedish politician. Since September 2018, she serves as Member of the Riksdag. She was again elected as Member of the Riksdag in September 2022. She represents the constituency of Stockholm Municipality. She represented Stockholm County from 2018 to 2022. She is affiliated with the Left Party. Since 2020, she has been the deputy chairman of the Left Party.
