= Anna Lilliehöök =

Swedish politician (born 1947)

Anna Lilliehöök (born 1947) is a Swedish politician of the Moderate Party. Lilliehöök represented Stockholm Municipality in the Riksdag from 1998 to 2010. Lilliehöök was a member of the Riksdag's Defense Committee (1998–2002), Social Security Committee (2002–2006), and Finance Committee (2006–2010). From 1992 to 1994, Lilliehöök was a member of the Stockholm County Council. Lilliehöök is a civilekonom. Lilliehöök belongs to the Swedish nobility through marriage.
