= Ilyas Hassan =

Swedish politician (born 1992)

Member of the Riksdag
- Incumbent
- Assumed office 28 September 2026
- Constituency: Stockholm Municipality

Personal details
- Born: 21 February 1992 (age 34)
- Party: Left Party

Ilyas Hassan (born 21 February 1992) is a Swedish politician who was elected member of the Riksdag in 2026. He is the national coordinator for disability and patient organizations of Arbetarnas bildningsförbund.
