= Nikos Papadopoulos (Swedish politician) =

Swedish politician

Member of the Riksdag
- In office 1996–2010
- Constituency: Stockholm Municipality

Personal details
- Born: 1939 (age 86–87) northern Greece
- Party: Swedish Social Democratic Party
- Occupation: self-employed
- Website: Nikos Papadopoulos - www.socialdemokraterna.se

Nikos Papadopoulos (Greek: Νίκος Παπαδόπουλος; born 1939) is a Swedish Social Democrat politician, born in Greece.

Papadopoulos was born in a small village near Kavala, Greece, in 1939. His grandfather was a member of the Greek parliament, and as a consequence, their house was always open. Nikos claims that these childhood experiences gave him an understanding of how important empathy and solidarity is to humans. After finishing secondary school, he had to look for further education abroad, as his chances of getting into a Greek university were at the time very slim. In 1962, he immigrated to Sweden, and later studied at Stockholm University.

== Politics ==
Papadopoulos campaigned in the 1970s to give voting rights to non-citizen immigrants in Swedish municipal and county councils.

He first ran in the 1994 Swedish general election, but failed to win a seat. In 1996, he replaced Mats Hellström in the Riksdag, and in 1998 he was elected as a member in his own right. He was re-elected in 2002 and again in 2006.
