= Angelika Bengtsson =

Swedish politician (born 1990)

Angelika Bengtsson SD
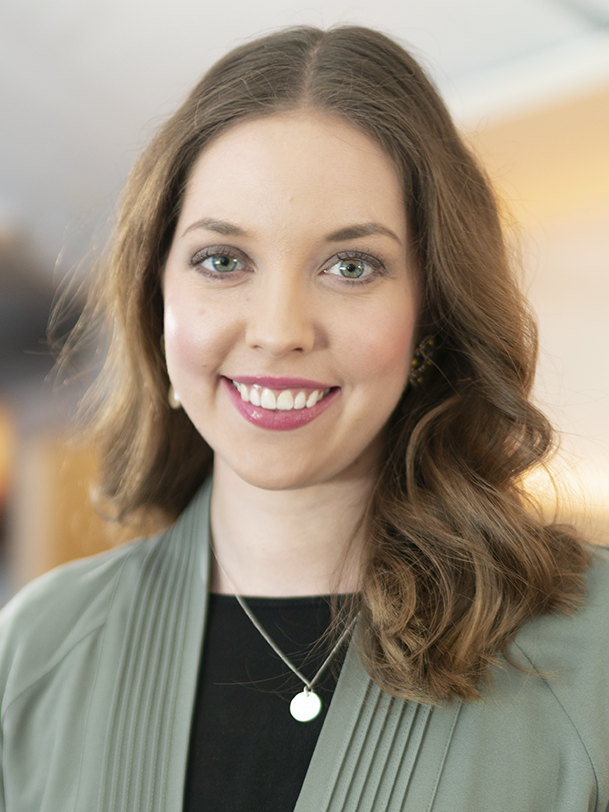
- Angelika Bengtsson's official portrait Picture: Sveriges riksdag

Member of the Riksdag
- Incumbent
- Assumed office 26 September 2022
- In office 29 September 2014 – 24 September 2018
- Constituency: Stockholm Municipality
- In office 24 September 2018 – 26 September 2022
- Succeeded by: Ann-Christine From Utterstedt
- Constituency: Blekinge

Personal details
- Born: 20 February 1990 (age 36) Malmö, Scania, Sweden
- Party: Sweden Democrats

Angelika Beatrice Bengtsson (born 20 March 1990) is a Swedish politician and a member of the Riksdag sitting in seat number 63 for the constituency of Blekinge County for the Sweden Democrats.

Bengtsson grew up in Malmö and was classically trained as a dancer and ballerina with the Royal Swedish Ballet School. She has worked as a tour guide in the Alps and in October 2014, said she was studying to become an occupational therapist. Bengtsson was elected to the Riksdag in 2014 for the Sweden Democrats. In parliament she sits with the Committee on Culture and in 2020 was elected Deputy Chairwoman of the Nordic Council's Committee on Knowledge and Culture.
