= Markus Kallifatides =

Swedish politician (born 1972)

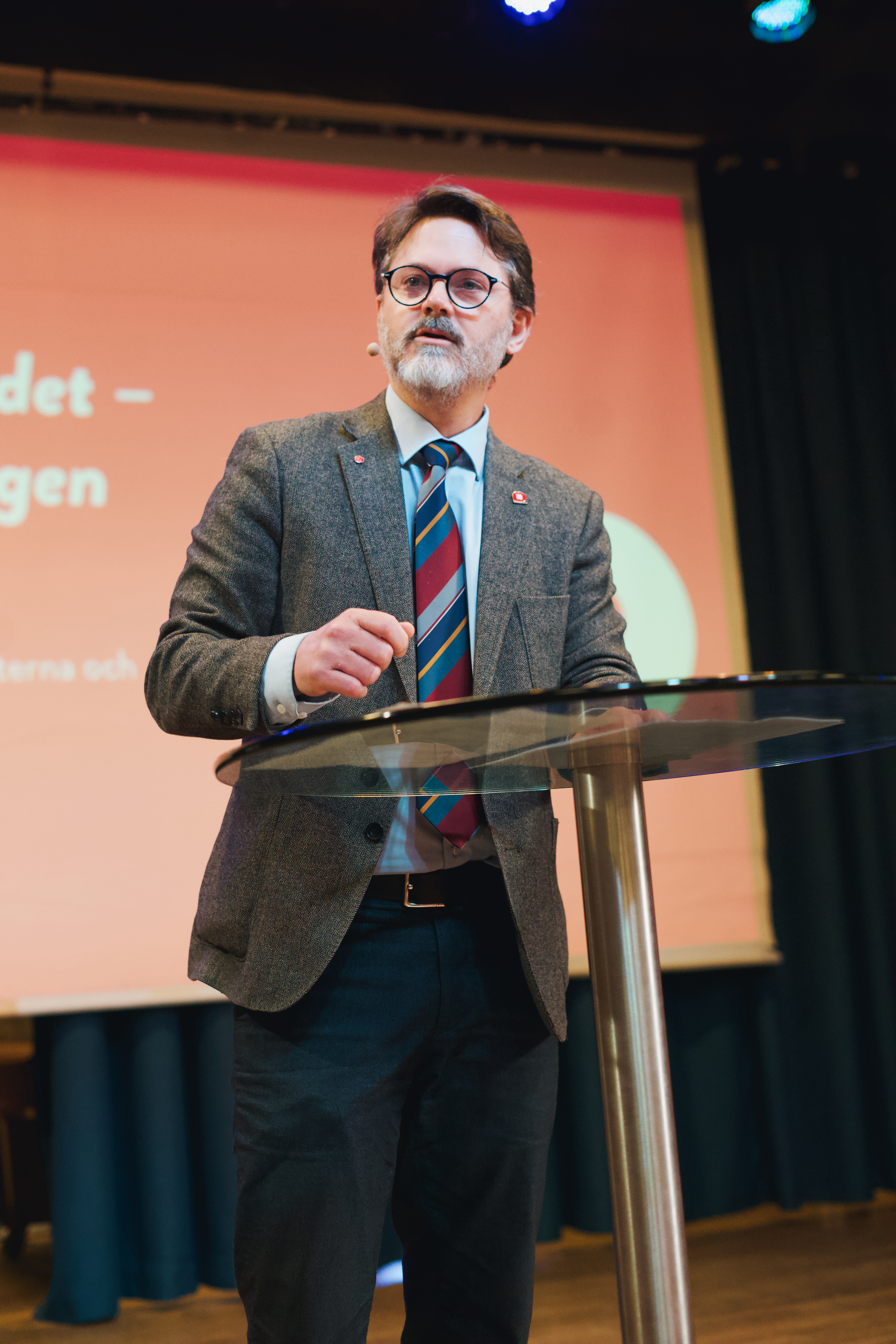
- Kallifatides in October 2022

Member of the Riksdag
- Incumbent
- Assumed office 26 September 2022
- Constituency: Stockholm Municipality

Personal details
- Born: Markus Kallifatides; 18 April 1972 (age 54)
- Party: Social Democratic Party
- Education: Stockholm School of Economics

Markus Kallifatides (born 18 April 1972) is a Swedish politician, economist and member of the Riksdag, the national legislature. A member of the Social Democratic Party, he has represented Stockholm Municipality since 2022.

Kallifatides studied business administration, economics, French, philosophy and political science at the University of Linköping, and psychology at the Stockholm University. He has a Master of Science degree from the Stockholm School of Economics (HHS).

== Researcher at the Stockholm School of Economics ==
Since 1996, Markus Kallifatides has taught organization and management theory at the Stockholm School of Economics. In 2002, Kallifatides’ doctoral dissertation, “Modern företagsledning och omoderna företagsledare” (“Modern Management and Not-so-modern Corporate Leaders”), was published. It was a four-year observational study of an industrial group and its top management.

Kallifatides’ early research addressed issues of Nordic corporate governance, the role of corporations in global relations, and corporate social responsibility. From 2010 onward, questions concerning the financialization of the Swedish and international economies have been recurring themes in his research.

Alongside his academic work, Kallifatides has published several reports on Swedish ownership and wealth structures, housing policy, wage formation, and the role of private capital in the transformation of the Swedish welfare model.

== Chair of the Swedish Social Democratic Party Association Reformisterna ==
Kallifatides began his political career as chair and co-founder of the Social Democratic party association Reformisterna (“The Reformists”). After its launch, it quickly grew to the largest association within the party. The association is considered as left-leaning within the party. In his role as chair, he has advocated for an investment-driven economic policy, the implementation of a new Social Democratic welfare model without for-profit actors in the schools, care and healtcare sector, and a more progressive tax system.

As chair of Reformisterna, Kallifatides has been critical of Sweden’s economic policy and on several occasions has criticized his own party for upholding fiscal rules that prevent deficit-financed infrastructure investment.

When the cross-party agreement on a new fiscal policy framework was presented in autumn 2024, Kallifatides voiced strong criticism and demanded that the matter be reviewed by the Social Democratic Party Executive Board. In winter 2025, he summarized his criticism of his party’s economic policies in the pamphlet “55 Theses for Reforming the Economic Policy of the Swedish Social Democratic Party.” According to Kallifatides, the purpose of the theses was to spark a broad debate ahead of the Social Democratic Congress on how the party should finance necessary reforms.

At the following Social Democratic Party Congress in spring 2025, the party opened up to allowing borrowing for major investments and ensuring that the wealthy contribute more through raised taxes. The decision was praised by Kallifatides, who had served as the lead negotiator for the party’s Stockholm City district.

On 14 November 2025, Kallifatides announced that he would step down as chair of the association at the upcoming annual meeting, after seven years in the position. He stated that he would remain a member of parliament.
