= Charlotte Broberg =

Swedish politician (born 1968)

Member of the Riksdag
- Incumbent
- Assumed office 28 September 2026
- Constituency: Stockholm Municipality

Personal details
- Born: Marie Charlotte Broberg; 8 June 1968 (age 58) Lomma, Sweden
- Party: Moderate Party
- Education: Uppsala University; Lund University

Marie Charlotte Broberg (born 8 June 1968) is a Swedish politician from the Moderate Party. She has been a member of the Riksdag since 2026, elected for the Stockholm Municipality constituency. Broberg took up the position as regional councilor in Region Stockholm after the 2018 election, She is the chairwoman of the Stockholm Region Property and Service Board and the region's property management company Locum AB.

Charlotte Broberg has previously served as chairwoman of the Stockholm County Council's Growth and Regional Planning Committee and the county council's property management company, Locum AB. She has also been a member of the board of Greater Stockholm Local Transport, and a member of Stockholm County Council since 1994. Broberg is educated in history and social sciences from Uppsala University and Lund University.

== See also ==
- List of members of the Riksdag, 2026–2030
