= Katarina Luhr =

Swedish politician (born 1973)

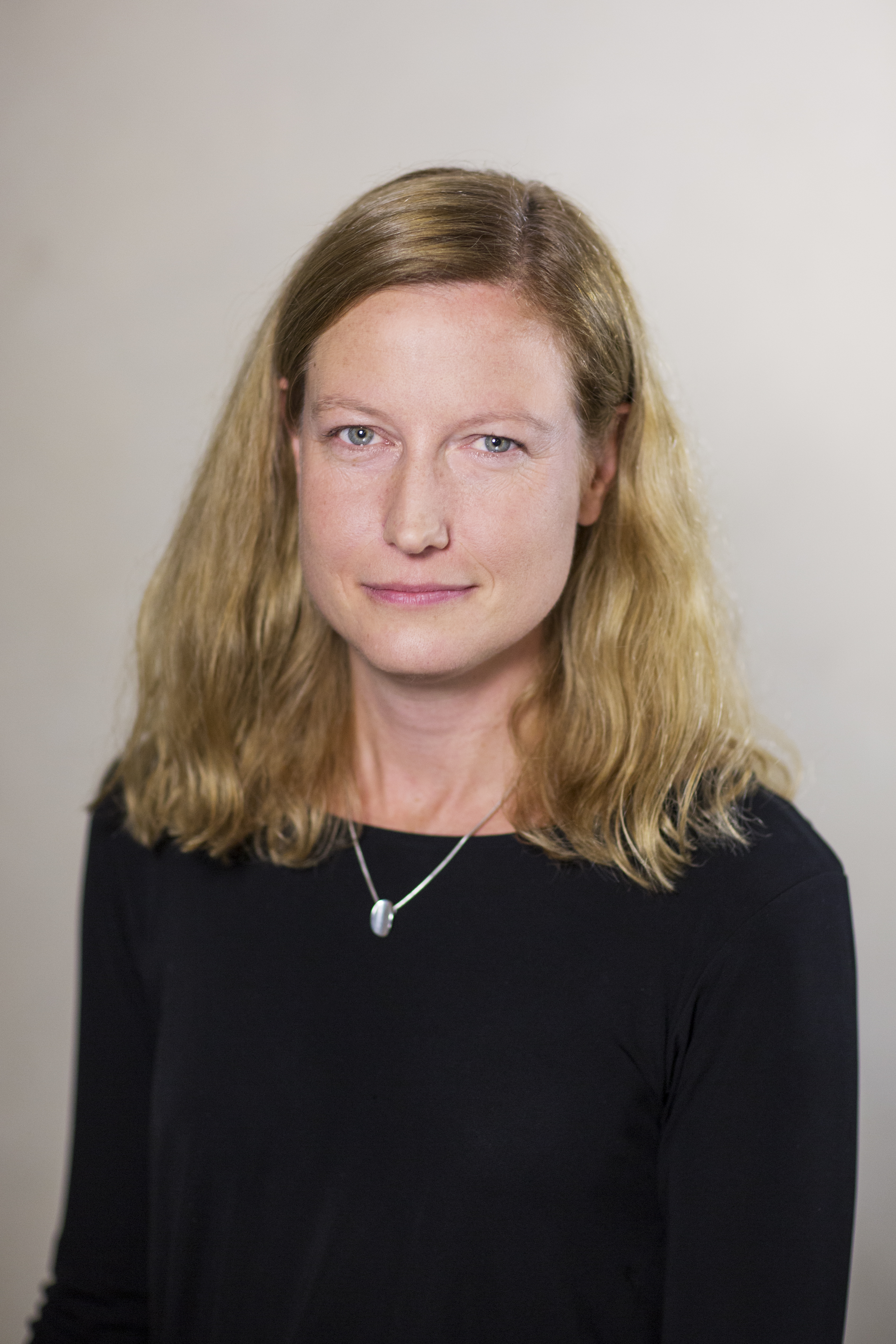
- Luhr in October 2014

Member of the Riksdag
- Incumbent
- Assumed office 18 October 2022
- Preceded by: Åsa Lindhagen
- Constituency: Stockholm Municipality

Personal details
- Born: 8 January 1973 (age 53)
- Party: Green Party

Anna Katarina Monica Luhr (born 8 January 1973) is a Swedish politician and member of the Riksdag, the national legislature. A member of the Green Party, she has represented Stockholm Municipality since October 2022. She is a member of the municipal council in Stockholm Municipality.
