= Elisabeth Fleetwood =

Swedish politician (1927–2024)

Member of the Riksdag
- In office 1979–2002
- Constituency: Stockholm Municipality

Personal details
- Born: 17 October 1927
- Died: 22 July 2024 (aged 96)

Alma Fredrika Elisabeth Svantesdotter Fleetwood (17 October 1927 – 22 July 2024) was a Swedish politician from the Moderate Party who was a Member of the Riksdag for the constituency of Stockholm Municipality.
