= Merit Frost Lindberg =

Swedish politician (born 1973)

Member of the Riksdag
- Incumbent
- Assumed office 28 September 2026
- Constituency: Stockholm Municipality

Personal details
- Born: Merit Döme; 20 August 1973 (age 53) Engelbrekt Parish, Stockholm, Sweden
- Party: Moderate Party

Merit Frost Lindberg (formerly Lindberg; née Döme; born 20 August 1973) is a Swedish politician from the Moderate Party. She has been a member of the Riksdag since 2026, elected for the Stockholm Municipality constituency.

== Career ==
Frost Lindberg ran in the 2022 Swedish general election and became a substitute. She was the acting substitute in the Riksdag for Jessica Rosencrantz during the period 16 January 2023 to 14 May 2023. When Rosencrantz became a minister in September 2024, Frost Lindberg became a substitute minister. In the Riksdag, she is a deputy member of the Committee on the Labour Market and the Committee on Social Insurance. After the 2026 Swedish general election, she became a substitute for Benjamin Dousa.

== See also ==
- List of members of the Riksdag, 2026–2030
