= Martin Ådahl =

Swedish politician (born 1969)

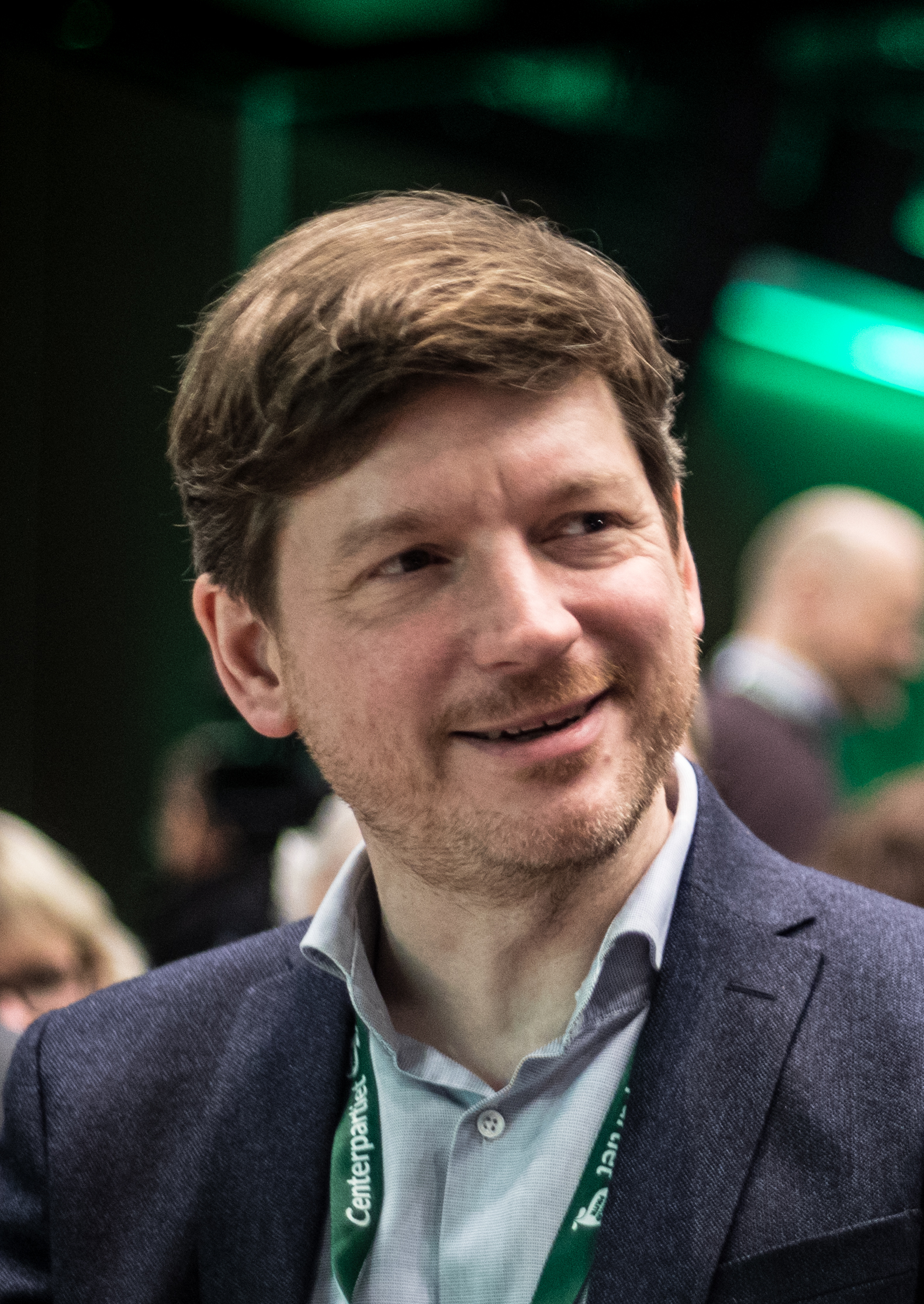
- Ådahl in 2018

Member of the Riksdag
- Incumbent
- Assumed office 24 September 2018
- Constituency: Stockholm Municipality

Personal details
- Born: 5 December 1969 (age 56)
- Party: Centre Party
- Parent: Andreas Ådahl (father)

Sven Martin Andreas Ådahl (born 5 December 1969) is a Swedish politician who has served as a member of the Riksdag since 2018. He has served as economic spokesperson of the Centre Party since 2021.

Party political offices
Preceded by Fredrick Federley	Second Deputy Leader of the Centre Party; 2021–2023	Succeeded by Ulrika Liljeberg
