= Mirja Räihä =

Swedish politician (born 1959)

Member of the Riksdag
- Incumbent
- Assumed office 26 September 2022
- Constituency: Stockholm Municipality

Personal details
- Born: 15 May 1959 (age 67)
- Party: Social Democrats

Mirja Räihä (born 15 May 1959) is a Swedish politician. She was elected as Member of the Riksdag in September 2022. She represents the constituency of Stockholm Municipality. She is affiliated with the Social Democrats.
