= Lawen Redar =

Swedish politician (born 1989)

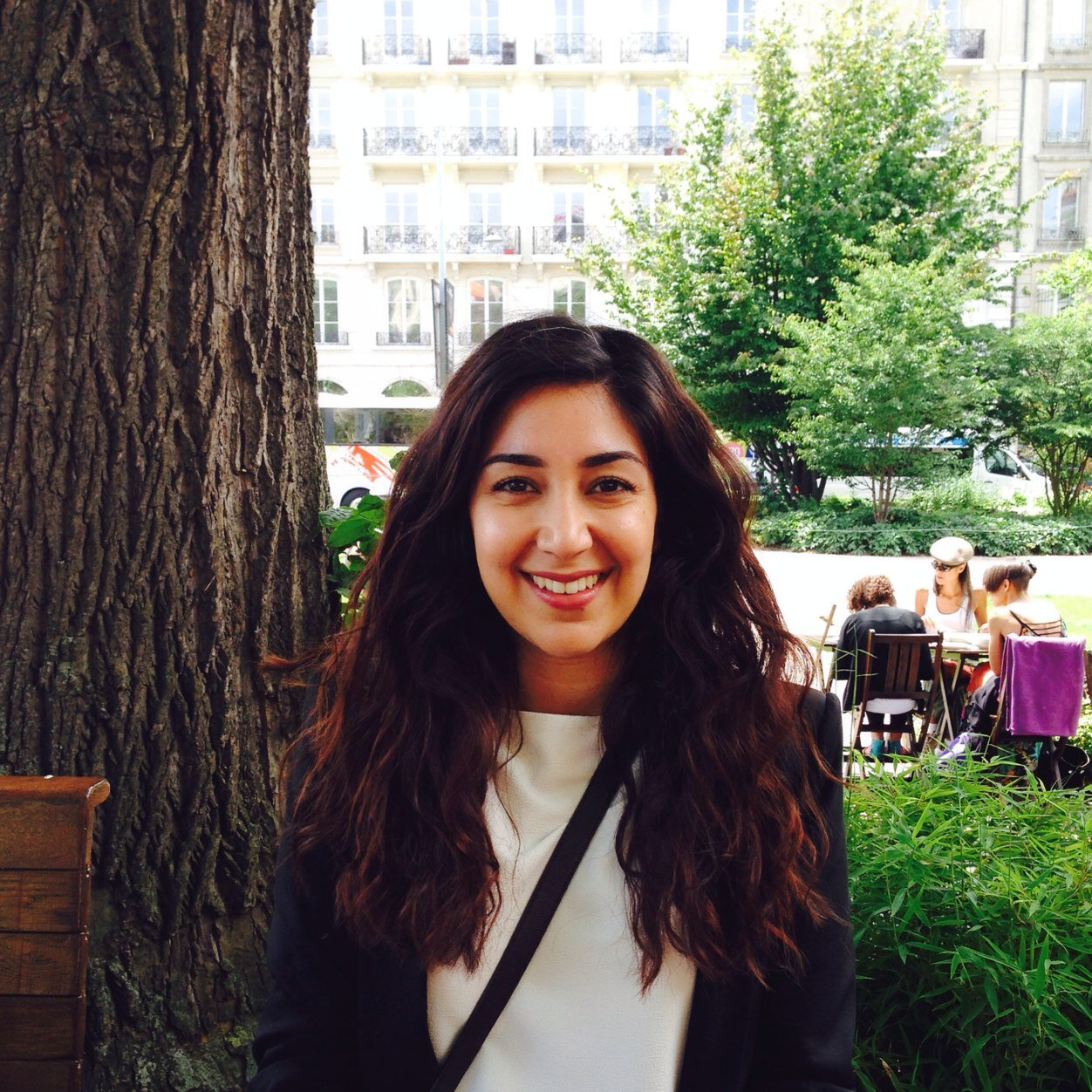
- Lawen Redar

Member of the Riksdag
- Incumbent
- Assumed office 1 October 2015
- Constituency: Stockholm

Personal details
- Born: September 29, 1989 (age 37) Vällingby, Sweden
- Party: Swedish Social Democratic Party

Lawen Redar (born 1989) is a Swedish-Kurdish politician currently sitting in the Riksdag for the Social Democrats. She holds a law degree from Stockholm University.
