= Camilla Brodin =

Swedish politician (born 1979)

Camilla Brodin S
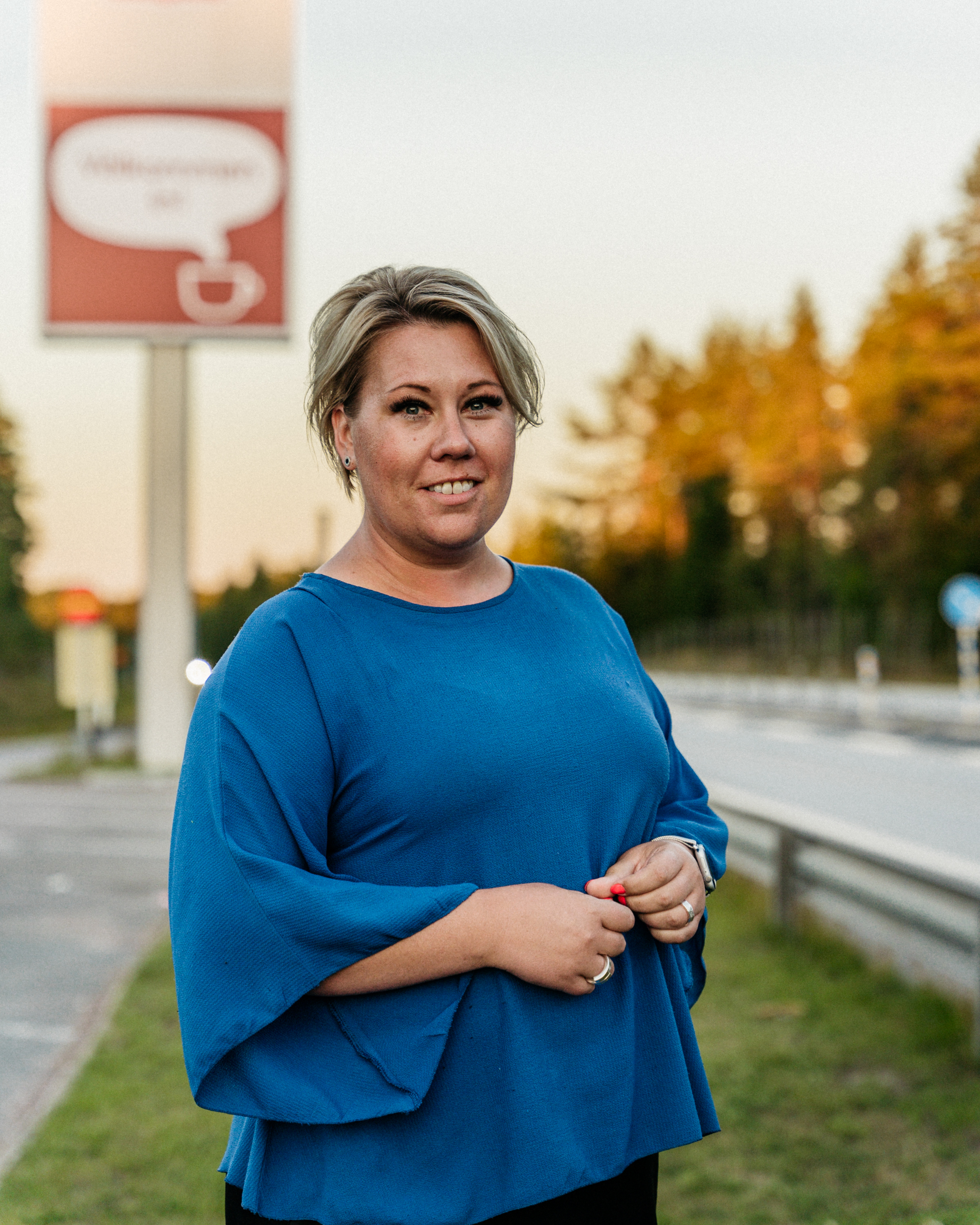
- Brodin in 2022

Member of the Swedish Parliament for Stockholm Municipality
- Incumbent
- Assumed office 2018

Personal details
- Born: Helena Camilla Iréne Torstensson; 20 May 1969 (age 57) Borås, Sweden
- Party: Christian Democrats
- Education: Karlstad University; Stockholm University
- Profession: Politician

Helena Camilla Iréne Brodin (née Torstensson; born 24 June 1979) is a Swedish politician from the Christian Democrats who has been a Member of the Riksdag since 2018.

== See also ==
- List of members of the Riksdag, 2018–2022
- List of members of the Riksdag, 2022–2026
