= Karin Rågsjö =

Swedish politician (born 1955)

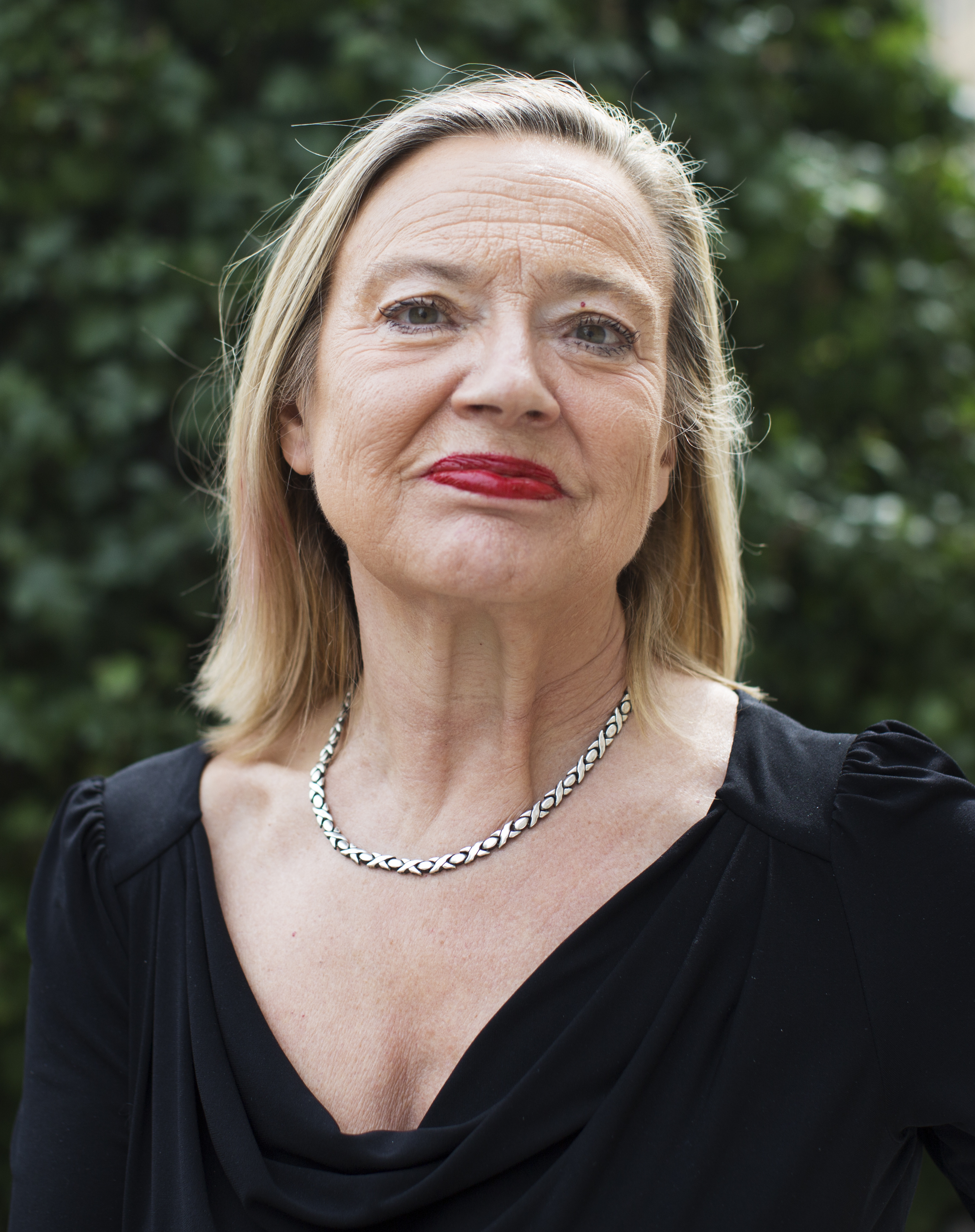
- Rågsjö in 2018

Member of the Riksdag
- Incumbent
- Assumed office 29 September 2014
- Constituency: Stockholm Municipality

Personal details
- Born: 23 April 1955 (age 70)
- Party: Left Party

Karin Rågsjö (born 23 April 1955) is a Swedish politician. Since September 2014, she serves as Member of the Riksdag. She is affiliated with the Left Party. She represents the constituency of Stockholm Municipality.

She was re-elected as Member of the Riksdag in September 2018 and September 2022.

By 2018, she had become the Left Party's health policy spokesperson. She maintained the role throughout the COVID-19 pandemic.
