= Margó Ingvardsson =

Swedish politician (born 1941)

Margó Ingvardsson S

Member of the Swedish Parliament for Stockholm
- In office 1983–1991

Personal details
- Born: 16 February 1941 (age 85) Nykvarn, Stockholm County, Sweden
- Party: Swedish Social Democratic Party (from 1991)
- Other political affiliations: Left Party – the Communists (until 1991)
- Profession: Politician

Margó Ingvardsson (born 16 February 1941) is a Swedish physiotherapist and retired politician. She was a Member of the Riksdag for the then Left Party Communists between 1983 and 1991.

== Family ==
She is the grandmother of Member of Parliament Magdalena Schröder, who has been in the Riksdag for the Moderate Party since 2018.
