= Talla Alkurdi =

Swedish politician (born 1984)

Member of the Riksdag
- Incumbent
- Assumed office 28 September 2026
- Constituency: Stockholm Municipality

Personal details
- Born: 6 March 1984 (age 42)
- Party: Social Democratic Party

Talla Alkurdi (born 6 March 1984) is an Emirati-born Swedish politician who was elected member of the Riksdag in 2026. She has served as regional councillor for health and medical care of Region Stockholm since 2022.
