= Lotta Högström =

Swedish politician (born 1962)

Member of the Riksdag
- Incumbent
- Assumed office 28 September 2026
- Constituency: Stockholm Municipality

Personal details
- Born: Lotta Högström; 1962 (age 63–64)
- Party: Moderate Party

Lotta Högström (born 1962) is a Swedish politician from the Moderate Party. She has been a member of the Riksdag since 2026, elected for the Stockholm Municipality constituency.

== Background ==
Högström is an environmental chemist and logistician and has worked with electrification and reduced use of fossil fuels.

== Political career ==
Högström has been active within the Moderate Party in Spånga, including as the association's secretary.

She also has assignments within Region Stockholm as a substitute in the regional council and the regional board's environmental and sustainability committee, and as a member of the public health and dental care committee.

== See also ==
- List of members of the Riksdag, 2026–2030
