= Pernilla Zethraeus =

Swedish politician

member of the Riksdag
- In office 2006–2008

Personal details
- Political party: Left Party

Pernilla Zethraeus, born in 1962, is a former Swedish politician of the Left Party. She was a member of the Riksdag between 2006 and 2008, when she was relieved of duty at her own request due to health issues related to ME/CFS. She served as the party secretary for the Left Party between 2000 and 2006.
