= Caroline Szyber =

Swedish politician (born 1981)

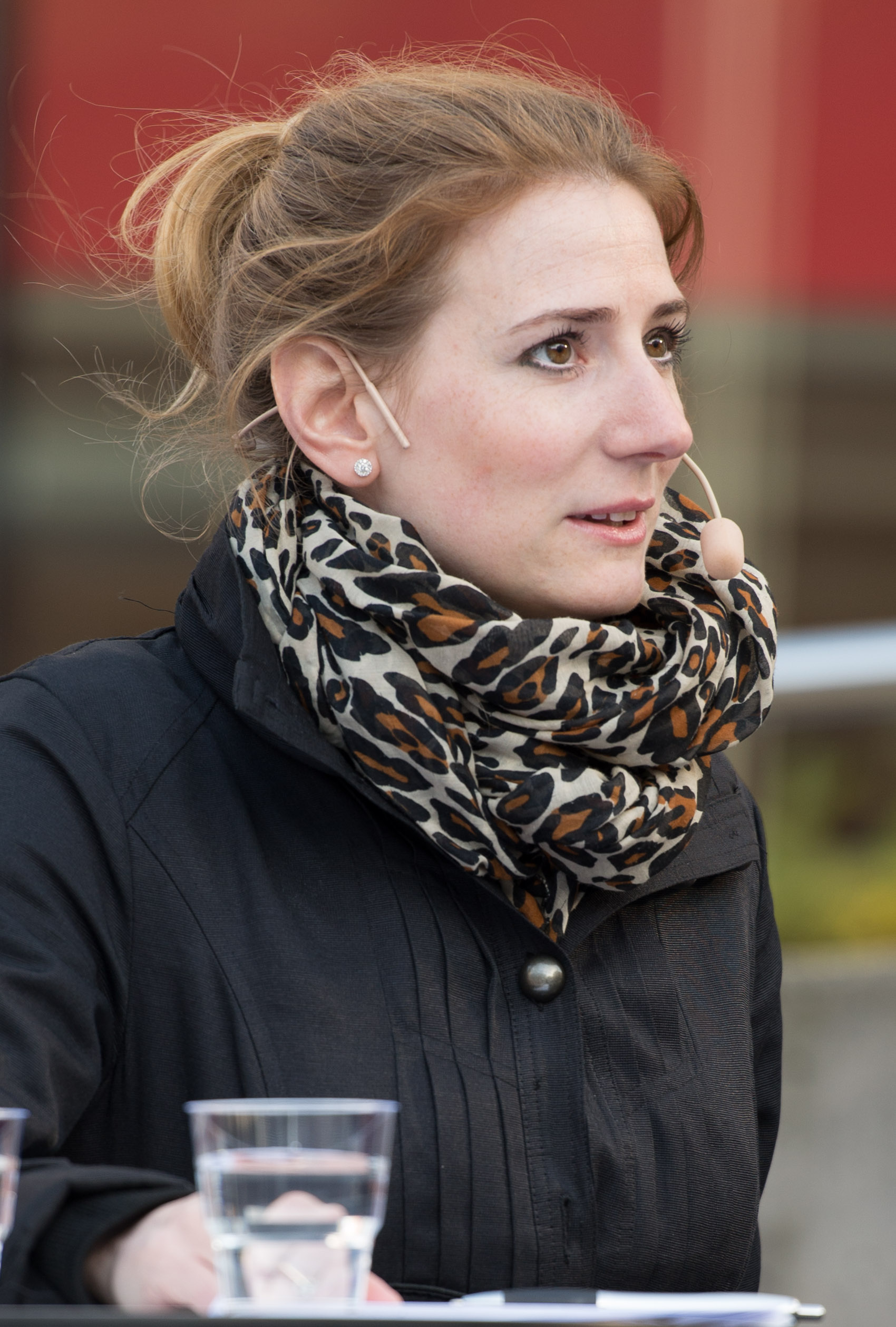

Member of the Swedish Riksdag for Stockholm
- Incumbent
- Assumed office 14 September 2014

Personal details
- Born: 7 October 1981 (age 43); Sweden
- Political party: Christian Democrats
- Occupation: Politician
- Website: http://www.carolineszyber.se

Anna Ester Caroline Szyber (born 7 October 1981) is a Swedish politician who has been a member of the Riksdag since 2014 as part of the Stockholm constituency. She received a Degree of Master of Laws, LL.M. and a M.A in political science, and during her education studied in Stockholm, Lund, San Francisco, and India. After graduating, she worked as a lawyer for the Swedish Department of International Law, then spent the next few years as a political analyst for the Christian Democrats in the Riksdag.

Szyber first ran for political office in 2010, and finished sixth in the Stockholm constituency; she ended up having a seat after Göran Hägglund was elected minister in the coalition government. She serves as a member of the Justice Committee, and also serves on the committee of Constitution, and European Union Affairs. During her time as an alternative Riksdag member, Szyber attended the 2010 Belarusian presidential election, and since then has spoken out about the government of Belarus, finding their elections to be undemocratic and the government to be committing human rights violations.

In 2014, Szyber again ran for a seat on the Riksdag. She serves as Chair of the Committee on Civil Affairs, and also serves on the Justice, Constitution, and European Union Affairs Committees.

Today she works as a legal adviser.
