= Inger Segelström =

Swedish politician (born 1952)

Inger Agneta Segelström (born 25 February 1952 in Stockholm) is a Swedish politician and former Member of the European Parliament. She is a member of the Swedish Social Democratic Party, part of the Socialist Group.

She sat on the European Parliament's Committee on Civil Liberties, Justice, and Home Affairs. She is also a substitute for the Committee on Foreign Affairs, and the Delegation to the EU-Russia Parliamentary Cooperation Committee.

== Education ==
- 1979: Law degree, Stockholm University

== Career ==
- 1977-1978: Employed by AFS International Education
- 1979-1984: Research assistant, principal executive officer, Labour Market Board
- 1984-1987: Commissioner's assistant secretary, finance department Stockholm City Hall
- 1987-1990: Head of administration, Stockholm University students' union
- 1990-1994: Environment secretary, association of local authorities, Stockholm County
- 1995-2003: Chairwoman of the Swedish Social Democratic Women's Federation
- since 2003: Chairwoman of the Council on Media Violence
- 1988: Substitute member of Stockholm County Council
- 1989-1991: Member of the staff committee, Stockholm County Council
- 1992-1994: Member of the Stockholm County Administrative Board
- 1994-2004: Member of the Swedish Parliament
- 1980-1984: Chairwoman of the foundation/association Alla Kvinnors Hus (All Women's House)

== See also ==
- 2004 European Parliament election in Sweden

== Sources ==
- Personal profile of Inger Segelström in the European Parliament's database of members
- Declaration (PDF) of financial interests (in Swedish)
- (in Swedish)
