= Maria Abrahamsson =

Swedish lawyer, journalist and politician

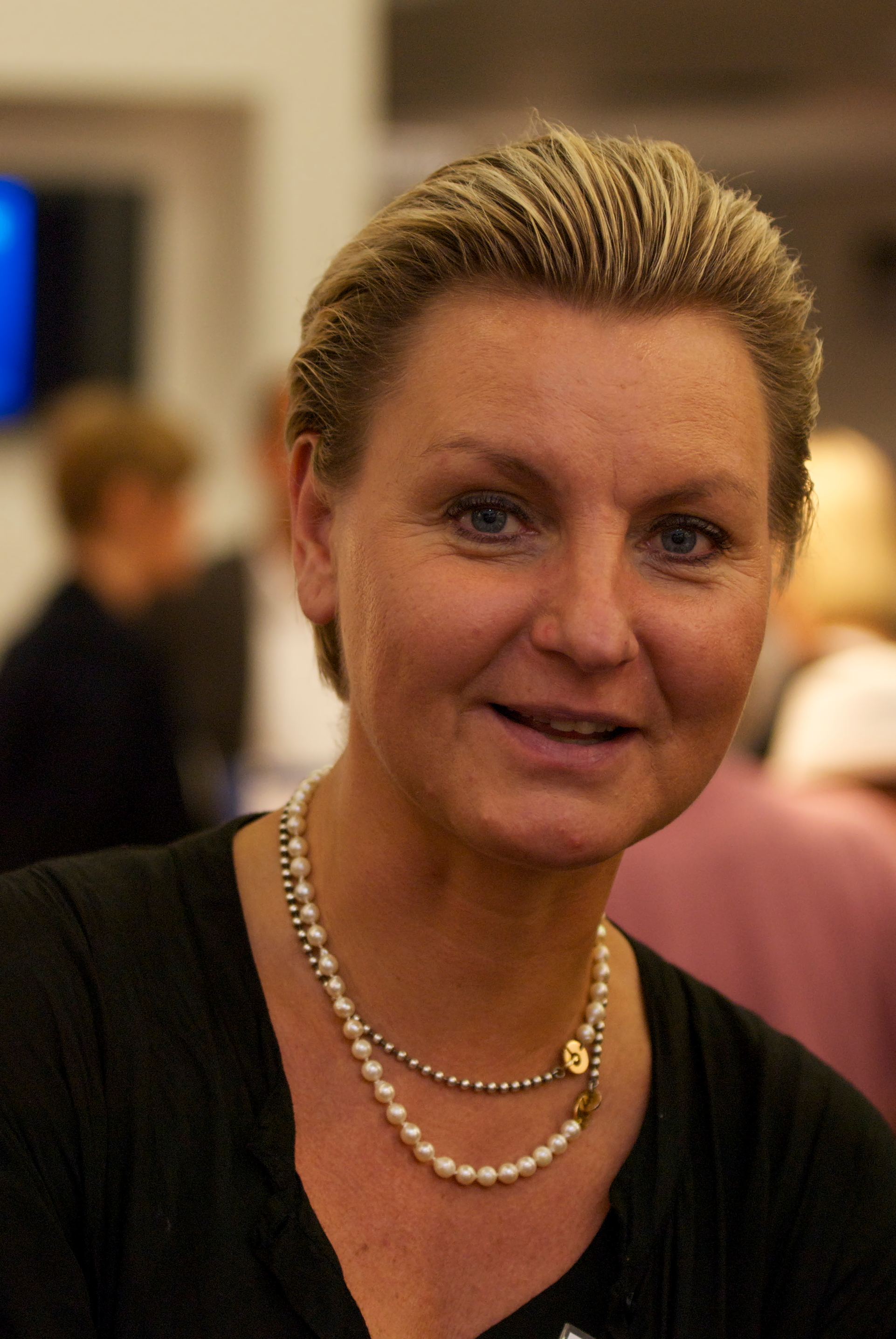
Maria Abrahamsson (2011)

Maria Abrahamsson (born 21 July 1963 in Kalmar) is a Swedish lawyer, journalist and politician for the Moderate Party. She was member of the Riksdag from 2010 to 2018. Previously she worked for ten years as an editorial journalist for Svenska Dagbladet.
