= Ewa Larsson =

Swedish politician (born 1952)

- Born: 1952 (age 73–74)
- Occupations: Politician, social scientist and waldorf teacher
- Known for: Member of the Riksdag

Ewa Larsson (born 1952) is a Swedish Green Party politician, social scientist and Waldorf schoolteacher. She served as a member of the Riksdag from the constituency Stockholms kommun from 1994 to 2002.
