= Carl Nordblom =

Swedish politician (born 1994)

Member of the Riksdag
- Incumbent
- Assumed office 18 October 2022
- Preceded by: Johan Forssell
- Constituency: Stockholm County

Personal details
- Born: Carl Olof Bengt Nordblom; 18 January 1994 (age 32)
- Party: Moderate

Carl Olof Bengt Nordblom (born 18 January 1994) is a Swedish politician serving as a member of the Riksdag since 2022. He previously served as chairman of the Moderate Youth League in Stockholm County.
