= Mattias Vepsä =

Swedish politician (born 1980)

Claes Mattias Vepsä
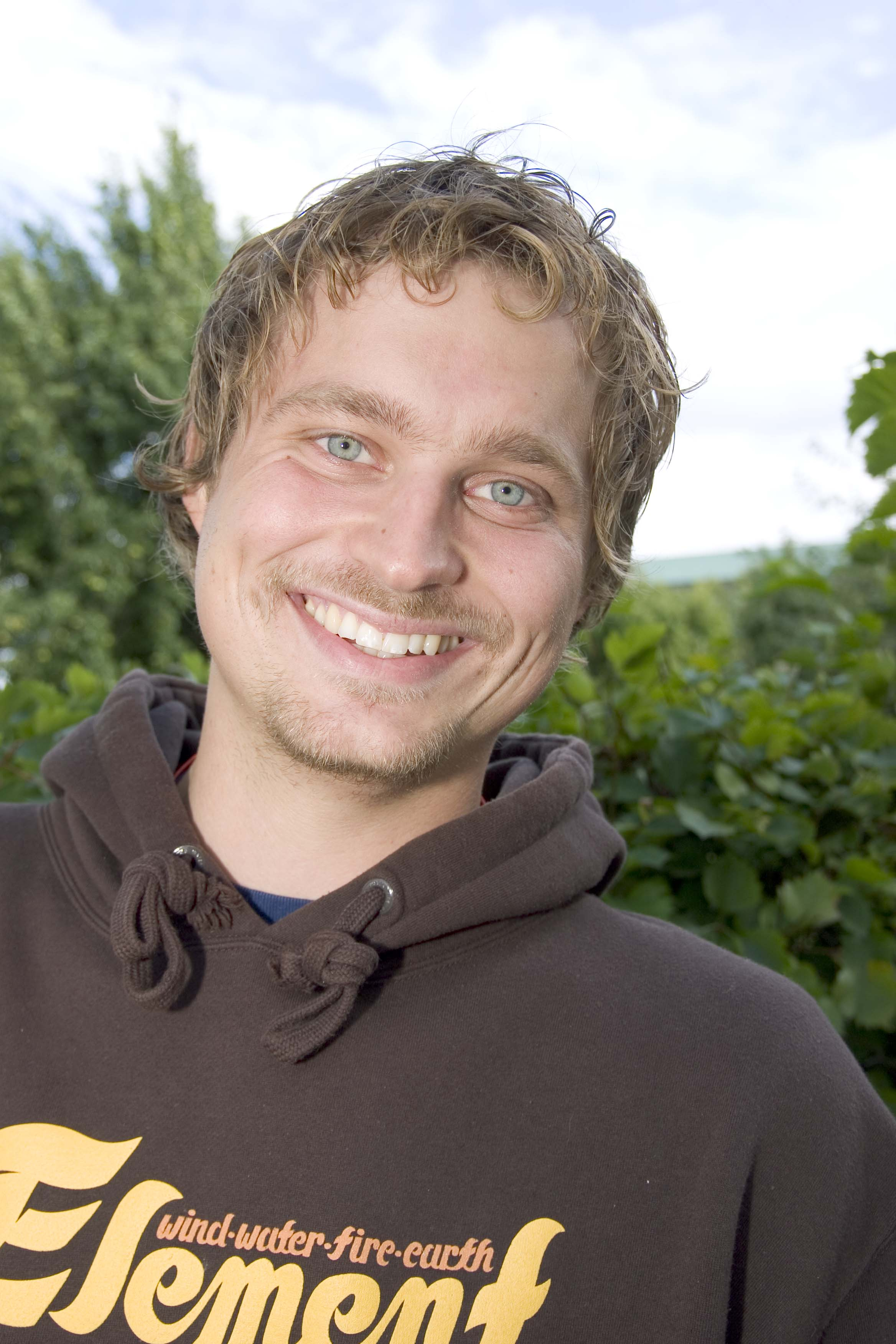

Member of Parliament
- Incumbent
- Assumed office 25 September 2017

Personal details
- Born: 2 February 1980 (age 46) Kista, Stockholm
- Party: Social Democratic

Claes Mattias Vepsä (born 2 February 1980 in Kista, Stockholm) is a Swedish Social Democratic politician who has served as a Member of Parliament since 2017. He serves as an alternate to the Minister for Energy and Digital Development Anders Ygeman's stead and represents Stockholm Municipality. After Thomas Hammarberg resigned from the Riksdag 31 January 2022, from 1 February 2022 Vepsä was assigned his seat and is an ordinary Member of Parliament.
