= Joe Frans (politician) =

Swedish politician

Joe Frans S

Member of the Riksdag
- In office 30 September 2002 – 2 October 2006
- Constituency: Stockholm Municipality

Personal details
- Born: 9 September 1963 (age 62) Takoradi, Ghana
- Party: Social Democratic Party
- Profession: Politician

Joe Frans (born Kojo Frans in Takoradi, Ghana) is a Swedish politician of Ghanaian descent, social activist, board professional and former member of parliament.

== Career ==
Joe Frans came to Sweden to attend university. During his studies he met his wife and became involved with politics. Frans has a diploma in Communications and has been the producer of the TV-show Sweden Today. He has also been CEO of Sweden Now AB and Skandinavisk Video Teknik AB, companies trading TV-broadcast rights.

For many years he worked as a Senior Political Advisor to the Deputy Mayor of Stockholm and as Press Secretary to the Mayor of Stockholm. He then stepped into national political arena and served as a member of the Swedish Parliament 2002–2006. In the Parliament he served on Committee on Justice and European Union Committee. When the Social Democratic Party lost power in 2006, Frans lost his seat in Parliament.

== Current Appointments ==
Today has several public appointments. He is a member of the Stockholm University board and the Swedish National Police Board.

Joe Frans is also the Chairperson of Forumsyd, the Social Democratic party in Vällingby district, Broderskapdistriktet (a Christian Socialdemocratoc organization) and Rinkeby folketshus.

Frans is the founder and CEO of Next Generation Africa and NGA Novum AB. He has also served as an Independent Expert for the United Nations Human Rights Council, Working Group of Experts on People of African Descent. Frans initiated the Swedish Martin Luther King Prize in 2005.
