= Börje Vestlund =

Swedish politician (1960–2017)

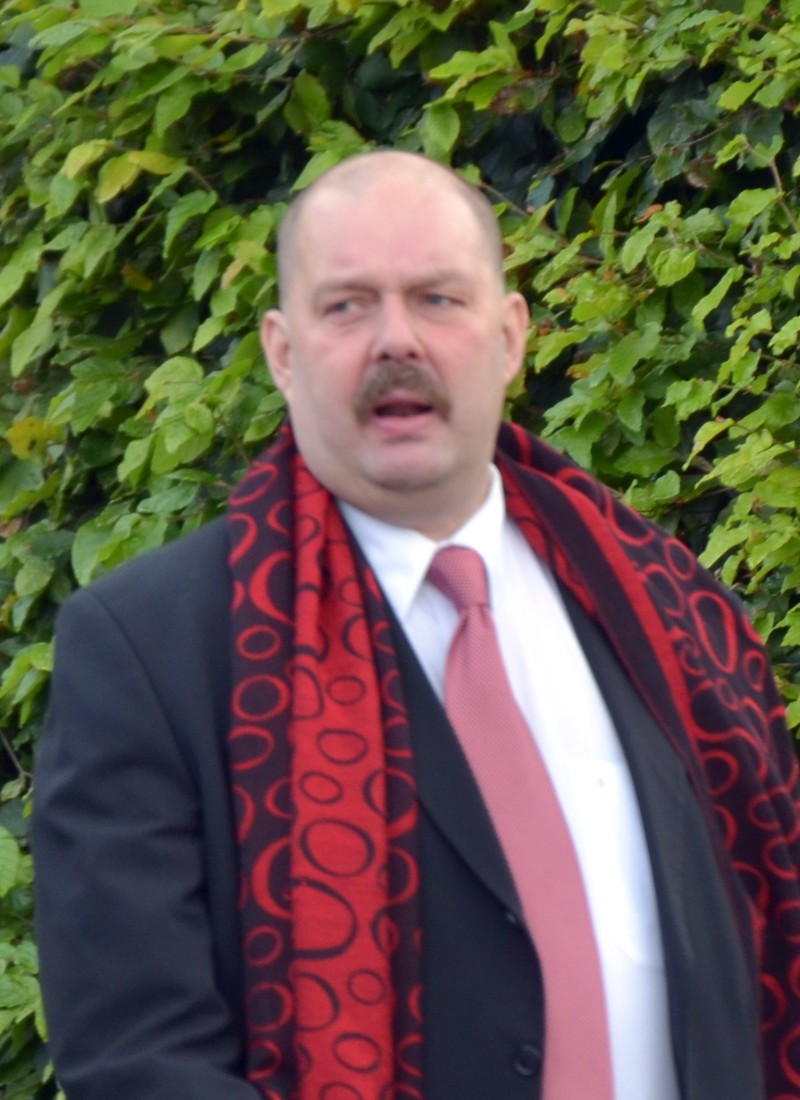

member of the Riksdag
- In office 2002–2017

Personal details
- Born: 2 February 1960
- Died: 22 September 2017 (aged 57)
- Party: Swedish Social Democratic Party

Börje Vestlund (2 February 1960 – 22 September 2017) was a Swedish Social Democratic politician. He served as a member of the Riksdag from 2002 until his death in 2017. He was gay.
