= Bertil Zachrisson =

Swedish politician (1926–2023)

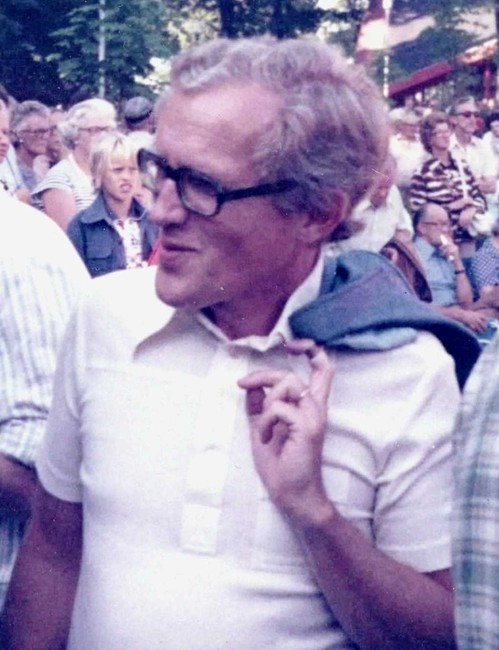
Bertil Zachrisson, 1976

Bertil Josef Zachrisson (2 May 1926 – 29 August 2023) was a Swedish politician.

Zachrisson was editor of Svensk Veckotidning before serving as a Social Democrat MP from 1969 until 1983. He was Minister for Education from 1973 to 1976 and director general (postmaster general) of Postverket, the Swedish post office, from 1982 to 1988. Zachrisson was also active in the Religious Social Democrats of Sweden organisation. He died on 29 August 2023, at the age of 97.
