= Sylvia Lindgren =

Swedish politician (born 1945)

Personal details
- Born: 1945 (age 80–81)
- Party: Social Democratic

Sylvia Lindgren (born 1945) is a Swedish social democratic politician who has been a member of the Riksdag from 1992 to 2010.
