= List of members of the Riksdag, 2026–2030 =

This is a list of members of the Riksdag, elected in the 2026 Swedish general election, for the term 2026–2030. The elected members took office on 28 September.

== Composition ==
By party (preliminary result)
Social Democrats	1,790,848	28.06	100	–7
Moderate Party	1,267,018	19.85	70	+2
Sweden Democrats	1,118,521	17.53	62	–11
Left Party	526,521	8.25	29	+5
Centre Party	450,557	7.06	25	+1
Christian Democrats	395,880	6.20	22	+3
Green Party	389,609	6.11	22	+4
Liberals	342,575	5.37	19	+3
Others	99,868	1.56	–	–
Total	6,381,397	100.00	349	0

== Party leaders ==
- Magdalena Andersson (Social Democrats)
- Ulf Kristersson (Moderate)
- Jimmie Åkesson (Sweden Democrats)
- Nooshi Dadgostar (Left)
- Elisabeth Thand Ringqvist (Centre)
- Ebba Busch (Christian Democrats)
- Amanda Lind (Green)
- Daniel Helldén (Green)
- Simona Mohamsson (Liberals)

== List of MPs ==
Below is a list of the members elected in the 2026 Swedish general election:

No.	Member	Party	Constituency
	Carl Nordblom	Moderate Party	Stockholm Municipality
	Gunnar Strommer	Moderate Party	Stockholm Municipality
	Jessica Rosencrantz	Moderate Party	Stockholm Municipality
	Johan Forssell	Moderate Party	Stockholm Municipality
	Benjamin Dousa	Moderate Party	Stockholm Municipality
	Kristina Axén Olin	Moderate Party	Stockholm Municipality
	Elisabeth Thand Ringqvist	Centre Party	Stockholm Municipality
	Birgitta Ohlsson	Centre Party	Stockholm Municipality
	Martin Ådahl	Centre Party	Stockholm Municipality
	Charlotte Edholm	Liberals	Stockholm Municipality
	Romina Pourmokhtari	Liberals	Stockholm Municipality
	Joar Forssell	Liberals	Stockholm Municipality
	Camilla Brodin	Christian Democrats	Stockholm Municipality
	Anders Ygeman	Social Democrats	Stockholm Municipality
	Lawen Redar	Social Democrats	Stockholm Municipality
	Mattias Vepsä	Social Democrats	Stockholm Municipality
	Talla Alkurdi	Social Democrats	Stockholm Municipality
	Kadir Kasirga	Social Democrats	Stockholm Municipality
	Jytte Guteland	Social Democrats	Stockholm Municipality
	Markus Kallifatides	Social Democrats	Stockholm Municipality
	Mirja Räihä	Social Democrats	Stockholm Municipality
	Daniel Vencu Velasquez Castro	Social Democrats	Stockholm Municipality
	Malin Björk	Left Party	Stockholm Municipality
	Ilyas Hassan	Left Party	Stockholm Municipality
	Ida Gabrielsson	Left Party	Stockholm Municipality
	Andreas Lennkvist Manriquez	Left Party	Stockholm Municipality
	Daniel Hellden	Green Party	Stockholm Municipality
	Åsa Lindhagen	Green Party	Stockholm Municipality
	Ulrika Westerlund	Green Party	Stockholm Municipality
	Gurgin Bakircioglu	Green Party	Stockholm Municipality
	Nila Vikhe Patil	Green Party	Stockholm Municipality
	Johan Tireland	Sweden Democrats	Stockholm Municipality
	Henrik Vinge	Sweden Democrats	Stockholm Municipality
	Linus Bylund	Sweden Democrats	Stockholm Municipality
	Adam Reuterskiöld	Moderate Party	Stockholm County
	Parisa Liljestrand	Moderate Party	Stockholm County
	Niklas Wykman	Moderate Party	Stockholm County
	Karin Enstrom	Moderate Party	Stockholm County
	Erik Ottoson	Moderate Party	Stockholm County
	Josefin Malmqvist	Moderate Party	Stockholm County
	Fredrik Karrholm	Moderate Party	Stockholm County
	Ida Drougge	Moderate Party	Stockholm County
	Alexandra Anstrell	Moderate Party	Stockholm County
	Joanna Lewerentz	Moderate Party	Stockholm County
	Kerstin Lundgren	Centre Party	Stockholm County
	Anna Lasses	Centre Party	Stockholm County
	Rasmus Elfström	Centre Party	Stockholm County
	Nina Larsson	Liberals	Stockholm County
	Johan Britz	Liberals	Stockholm County
	Karin Karlsbro	Liberals	Stockholm County
	Christian Carlsson	Christian Democrats	Stockholm County
	Jakob Forssmed	Christian Democrats	Stockholm County
	Magdalena Andersson	Social Democrats	Stockholm County
	Mikael Damberg	Social Democrats	Stockholm County
	Åsa Westlund	Social Democrats	Stockholm County
	Sarkis Johannes Khatchadourian	Social Democrats	Stockholm County
	Alexandra Volker	Social Democrats	Stockholm County
	Leif Nysmed	Social Democrats	Stockholm County
	Azadeh Rojhan Gustafsson	Social Democrats	Stockholm County
	Mathias Tegnér	Social Democrats	Stockholm County
	Katarina Berggren	Social Democrats	Stockholm County
	Markus Selin	Social Democrats	Stockholm County
	Andrine Winther	Social Democrats	Stockholm County
	Emil Högberg	Social Democrats	Stockholm County
	Nooshi Dadgostar	Left Party	Stockholm County
	Jonas Lindberg	Left Party	Stockholm County
	Sandra Sönnergren	Left Party	Stockholm County
	Andrea Andersson-Tay	Left Party	Stockholm County
	Amanda Lind	Green Party	Stockholm County
	Annika Hirvonen	Green Party	Stockholm County
	Ajda Asgari	Green Party	Stockholm County
	Martin Westmont	Sweden Democrats	Stockholm County
	Fredrik Lindahl	Sweden Democrats	Stockholm County
	Ludvig Aspling	Sweden Democrats	Stockholm County
	Julia Kronlid	Sweden Democrats	Stockholm County
	Martin Kinnunen	Sweden Democrats	Stockholm County
	Andrea Kronvall	Sweden Democrats	Stockholm County
	Stefan Olsson	Moderate Party	Uppsala County
	Fredrik Ahlstedt	Moderate Party	Uppsala County
	Catarina Deremar	Centre Party	Uppsala County
	Lina Nordquist	Liberals	Uppsala County
	Mikael Oscarsson	Christian Democrats	Uppsala County
	Ardalan Shekarabi	Social Democrats	Uppsala County
	Ylva Stadell	Social Democrats	Uppsala County
	Gustaf Lantz	Social Democrats	Uppsala County
	Åsa Andersson	Social Democrats	Uppsala County
	Tobias Smedberg	Left Party	Uppsala County
	Jacob Risberg	Green Party	Uppsala County
	Emil Eneblad	Sweden Democrats	Uppsala County
	David Perez	Sweden Democrats	Uppsala County
	Ulf Kristersson	Moderate Party	Södermanland County
	Anna af Sillén	Moderate Party	Södermanland County
	Martina Johansson	Centre Party	Södermanland County
	Paul Sabo	Christian Democrats	Södermanland County
	Fredrik Olovsson	Social Democrats	Södermanland County
	Sofia Amloh	Social Democrats	Södermanland County
	Jimmy Jansson	Social Democrats	Södermanland County
	Maria Forsberg	Left Party	Södermanland County
	Mohamed Abdukani	Green Party	Södermanland County
	Mikael Strömberg	Sweden Democrats	Södermanland County
	Adam Marttinen	Sweden Democrats	Södermanland County
	Andreas Norlen	Moderate Party	Östergötland County
	Matilda Ekeblad	Moderate Party	Östergötland County
	John Weinerhall	Moderate Party	Östergötland County
	Muharrem Demirok	Centre Party	Östergötland County
	Patrik Karlson	Liberals	Östergötland County
	Magnus Oscarsson	Christian Democrats	Östergötland County
	Teresa Carvalho	Social Democrats	Östergötland County
	Johan Andersson	Social Democrats	Östergötland County
	Eva Lindh	Social Democrats	Östergötland County
	Elias Hammarlund Aguirre	Social Democrats	Östergötland County
	Malin Östh	Left Party	Östergötland County
	Rebecka Le Moine	Green Party	Östergötland County
	Jonas Andersson	Sweden Democrats	Östergötland County
	Clara Aranda	Sweden Democrats	Östergötland County
	Aron Emilsson	Sweden Democrats	Östergötland County
	Mats Green	Moderate Party	Jönköping County
	Susanne Wahlström	Moderate Party	Jönköping County
	Emma Brihall	Centre Party	Jönköping County
	Erik Nygårds	Liberals	Jönköping County
	Camilla Rinaldo Miller	Christian Democrats	Jönköping County
	Johanna Haraldsson	Social Democrats	Jönköping County
	Ilan De Basso	Social Democrats	Jönköping County
	Azra Muranovic	Social Democrats	Jönköping County
	Ciczie Weidby	Left Party	Jönköping County
	Rikard Salander	Green Party	Jönköping County
	Yasmine Eriksson	Sweden Democrats	Jönköping County
	Ida Kors	Sweden Democrats	Jönköping County
	Eric Westroth	Sweden Democrats	Jönköping County
	Oliver Rosengren	Moderate Party	Kronoberg County
	Thomas Ragnarsson	Moderate Party	Kronoberg County
	Monica Haider	Social Democrats	Kronoberg County
	Robert Olesen	Social Democrats	Kronoberg County
	Ann-Christine From Utterstedt	Sweden Democrats	Kronoberg County
	Mattias Karlsson	Sweden Democrats	Kronoberg County
	Olle Olson	Moderate Party	Kalmar County
	Marie Nicholson	Moderate Party	Kalmar County
	Emmy Ahlstedt	Centre Party	Kalmar County
	Carl-Wiktor Svensson	Christian Democrats	Kalmar County
	Lena Hallengren	Social Democrats	Kalmar County
	Marcus Fridlund	Social Democrats	Kalmar County
	Johnny Svedin	Sweden Democrats	Kalmar County
	Mattias Backstrom Johansson	Sweden Democrats	Kalmar County
	Jesper Skalberg Karlsson	Moderate Party	Gotland County
	Meit Fohlin	Social Democrats	Gotland County
	Åsa Coenraads	Moderate Party	Blekinge County
	Heléne Björklund	Social Democrats	Blekinge County
	Magnus Johansson	Social Democrats	Blekinge County
	Karolina Widerberg	Sweden Democrats	Blekinge County
	Richard Jomshof	Sweden Democrats	Blekinge County
	Noria Manouchi	Moderate Party	Malmö Municipality
	Peter Ollén	Moderate Party	Malmö Municipality
	Niels Paarup-Petersen	Centre Party	Malmö Municipality
	Lars Leijonborg	Liberals	Malmö Municipality
	Joakim Sandell	Social Democrats	Malmö Municipality
	Rose-Marie Carlsson	Social Democrats	Malmö Municipality
	Arwin Sohrabi Nejad	Social Democrats	Malmö Municipality
	Anfal Mahdi	Left Party	Malmö Municipality
	Banesa Martinez Roldan	Left Party	Malmö Municipality
	Bassem Nasr	Green Party	Malmö Municipality
	Patrick Reslow	Sweden Democrats	Malmö Municipality
	Alexander Svensson	Moderate Party	Skåne County Western
	Mats Sander	Moderate Party	Skåne County Western
	Magnus Haara	Centre Party	Skåne County Western
	Mauricio Rojas	Liberals	Skåne County Western
	Niklas Karlsson	Social Democrats	Skåne County Western
	My Rosell	Social Democrats	Skåne County Western
	Ola Moller	Social Democrats	Skåne County Western
	Umihana Rasovic	Left Party	Skåne County Western
	Marcus Friberg	Green Party	Skåne County Western
	Pontus Andersson	Sweden Democrats	Skåne County Western
	Linda Lindberg	Sweden Democrats	Skåne County Western
	Bo Broman	Sweden Democrats	Skåne County Western
	Boriana Åberg	Moderate Party	Skåne County Southern
	Louise Meijer	Moderate Party	Skåne County Southern
	Amanda Thonander	Moderate Party	Skåne County Southern
	Stina Larsson	Centre Party	Skåne County Southern
	Camilla Mårtensen	Liberals	Skåne County Southern
	Cecilia Engstrom	Christian Democrats	Skåne County Southern
	Morgan Johansson	Social Democrats	Skåne County Southern
	Cilla Dahl Andersson	Social Democrats	Skåne County Southern
	Adrian Magnusson	Social Democrats	Skåne County Southern
	Hanna Gunnarsson	Left Party	Skåne County Southern
	Hanna Lindqvist	Green Party	Skåne County Southern
	Jessica Stegrud	Sweden Democrats	Skåne County Southern
	Victoria Tiblom	Sweden Democrats	Skåne County Southern
	Maria Malmer Stenergard	Moderate Party	Skåne County Northern and Eastern
	Daniel Lyckestam	Moderate Party	Skåne County Northern and Eastern
	Birte Sandberg	Centre Party	Skåne County Northern and Eastern
	Marianne Littke	Liberals	Skåne County Northern and Eastern
	Martin Hallander	Christian Democrats	Skåne County Northern and Eastern
	Anna Wallentheim	Social Democrats	Skåne County Northern and Eastern
	Per-Arne Håkansson	Social Democrats	Skåne County Northern and Eastern
	Ewa Pihl Krabbe	Social Democrats	Skåne County Northern and Eastern
	Linnea Bengtsson	Left Party	Skåne County Northern and Eastern
	Magnus Persson	Sweden Democrats	Skåne County Northern and Eastern
	Bjorn Soder	Sweden Democrats	Skåne County Northern and Eastern
	Mikael Eskilandersson	Sweden Democrats	Skåne County Northern and Eastern
	Helena Storckenfeldt	Moderate Party	Halland County
	Hanna Netterberg	Moderate Party	Halland County
	Lars Püss	Moderate Party	Halland County
	Christofer Bergenblock	Centre Party	Halland County
	Hanna Schölander	Liberals	Halland County
	Larry Söder	Christian Democrats	Halland County
	Jennie Nilsson	Social Democrats	Halland County
	Arbër Gashi	Social Democrats	Halland County
	Aida Birinxhiku	Social Democrats	Halland County
	Agnes Hultén	Left Party	Halland County
	Jan Riise	Green Party	Halland County
	Patrik Jönsson	Sweden Democrats	Halland County
	Andreas Ahlqvist	Sweden Democrats	Halland County
	Marie-Louise Hänel Sandström	Moderate Party	Gothenburg Municipality
	Gustaf Göthberg	Moderate Party	Gothenburg Municipality
	David Josefsson	Moderate Party	Gothenburg Municipality
	Rickard Nordin	Centre Party	Gothenburg Municipality
	Simona Mohamsson	Liberals	Gothenburg Municipality
	Elizabet Lann	Christian Democrats	Gothenburg Municipality
	Mattias Jonsson	Social Democrats	Gothenburg Municipality
	Amalia Rud Stenlöf	Social Democrats	Gothenburg Municipality
	Johan Büser	Social Democrats	Gothenburg Municipality
	Ingrid Andreae	Social Democrats	Gothenburg Municipality
	Robert Andersson Hammarstrand	Social Democrats	Gothenburg Municipality
	Daniel Bernmar	Left Party	Gothenburg Municipality
	Jennifer Merelaid Hankins	Left Party	Gothenburg Municipality
	Frida Tånghag	Left Party	Gothenburg Municipality
	Leila Ali Elmi	Green Party	Gothenburg Municipality
	Emma Nohrén	Green Party	Gothenburg Municipality
	Emma Ylivallo Altenhammar	Sweden Democrats	Gothenburg Municipality
	Dennis Dioukarev	Sweden Democrats	Gothenburg Municipality
	Camilla Waltersson Grönvall	Moderate Party	Västra Götaland County West
	Johanna Rantsi	Moderate Party	Västra Götaland County West
	Anna Vedin	Moderate Party	Västra Götaland County West
	Anders Ådahl	Centre Party	Västra Götaland County West
	Elin Andersson	Liberals	Västra Götaland County West
	Magnus Berntsson	Christian Democrats	Västra Götaland County West
	Aylin Nouri	Social Democrats	Västra Götaland County West
	Joakim Järrebring	Social Democrats	Västra Götaland County West
	Katarina Bosetti-Kristoffersson	Social Democrats	Västra Götaland County West
	Carina Örgård	Left Party	Västra Götaland County West
	Janine Alm Ericson	Green Party	Västra Götaland County West
	Gunilla Gomér	Sweden Democrats	Västra Götaland County West
	Alexander Christiansson	Sweden Democrats	Västra Götaland County West
	Ann-Sofie Alm	Moderate Party	Västra Götaland County North
	Jennie Bergius Eriksson	Moderate Party	Västra Götaland County North
	Cecilia Prins	Liberals	Västra Götaland County North
	Magnus Jacobsson	Christian Democrats	Västra Götaland County North
	Jonathan Svensson	Social Democrats	Västra Götaland County North
	Louise Thunstrom	Social Democrats	Västra Götaland County North
	Michael Melby	Social Democrats	Västra Götaland County North
	David Hoglund Velasquez	Left Party	Västra Götaland County North
	Terje Skaarnes	Sweden Democrats	Västra Götaland County North
	Matheus Enholm	Sweden Democrats	Västra Götaland County North
	Ulrik Nilsson	Moderate Party	Västra Götaland County South
	Annelie Hastig Olsson	Moderate Party	Västra Götaland County South
	Ingemar Kihlstrom	Christian Democrats	Västra Götaland County South
	Petter Löberg	Social Democrats	Västra Götaland County South
	Jessica Rodén	Social Democrats	Västra Götaland County South
	Denice Westerberg	Sweden Democrats	Västra Götaland County South
	Anders Alftberg	Sweden Democrats	Västra Götaland County South
	Sten Bergheden	Moderate Party	Västra Götaland County East
	Charlotte Nordstrom	Moderate Party	Västra Götaland County East
	Ulrika Heie	Centre Party	Västra Götaland County East
	Dan Hovskär	Christian Democrats	Västra Götaland County East
	Erik Ezelius	Social Democrats	Västra Götaland County East
	Therese Kristiansson	Social Democrats	Västra Götaland County East
	Marcus Andersson	Social Democrats	Västra Götaland County East
	Josef Fransson	Sweden Democrats	Västra Götaland County East
	Tobias Andersson	Sweden Democrats	Västra Götaland County East
	Pål Jonson	Moderate Party	Värmland County
	Magnus Resare	Moderate Party	Värmland County
	Daniel Bäckström	Centre Party	Värmland County
	Kjell-Arne Ottosson	Christian Democrats	Värmland County
	Mikael Dahlqvist	Social Democrats	Värmland County
	Sofia Skönnbrink	Social Democrats	Värmland County
	Peter Söderström	Social Democrats	Värmland County
	Håkan Svenneling	Left Party	Värmland County
	Robin Lennartsson	Sweden Democrats	Värmland County
	Runar Filper	Sweden Democrats	Värmland County
	Elisabeth Svantesson	Moderate Party	Örebro County
	Oskar Svärd	Moderate Party	Örebro County
	Helena Vilhelmsson	Centre Party	Örebro County
	Willhelm Sundman	Liberals	Örebro County
	Ebba Busch	Christian Democrats	Örebro County
	Matilda Ernkrans	Social Democrats	Örebro County
	Denis Begic	Social Democrats	Örebro County
	Karin Sundin	Social Democrats	Örebro County
	Nadja Awad	Left Party	Örebro County
	Camilla Hansén	Green Party	Örebro County
	Jimmie Åkesson	Sweden Democrats	Örebro County
	Per Söderlund	Sweden Democrats	Örebro County
	Caroline Högström	Moderate Party	Västmanland County
	Mikael Damsgaard	Moderate Party	Västmanland County
	Roger Haddad	Liberals	Västmanland County
	Åsa Eriksson	Social Democrats	Västmanland County
	Jonas Cronert	Social Democrats	Västmanland County
	Amanda Lindblad	Social Democrats	Västmanland County
	Hawar Asaiesh	Left Party	Västmanland County
	Tomas Brandberg	Sweden Democrats	Västmanland County
	Per Sjöstedt	Sweden Democrats	Västmanland County
	Carl Oskar Bohlin	Moderate Party	Dalarna County
	Crister Carlsson	Moderate Party	Dalarna County
	Ulrika Liljeberg	Centre Party	Dalarna County
	Mathias Bengtsson	Christian Democrats	Dalarna County
	Peter Hultqvist	Social Democrats	Dalarna County
	Marie Olsson	Social Democrats	Dalarna County
	Lars Isacson	Social Democrats	Dalarna County
	Mohamed Abdukardir Ali	Left Party	Dalarna County
	Mursal Isa	Green Party	Dalarna County
	Liselotte Forsberg	Sweden Democrats	Dalarna County
	Rasmus Giertz	Sweden Democrats	Dalarna County
	Viktor Wärnick	Moderate Party	Gävleborg County
	Lars Beckman	Moderate Party	Gävleborg County
	Caroline Schmidt	Centre Party	Gävleborg County
	Lili André	Christian Democrats	Gävleborg County
	Patrik Lundqvist	Social Democrats	Gävleborg County
	Sanna Backeskog	Social Democrats	Gävleborg County
	Kristoffer Lindberg	Social Democrats	Gävleborg County
	Samuel Gonzalez Westling	Left Party	Gävleborg County
	Mattias Eriksson Falk	Sweden Democrats	Gävleborg County
	Roger Hedlund	Sweden Democrats	Gävleborg County
	Jörgen Berglund	Moderate Party	Västernorrland County
	Anne-Li Sjölund	Centre Party	Västernorrland County
	Liza-Maria Norlin	Christian Democrats	Västernorrland County
	Malin Larsson	Social Democrats	Västernorrland County
	Peter Hedberg	Social Democrats	Västernorrland County
	Anna-Belle Strömberg	Social Democrats	Västernorrland County
	Angelika Bengtsson	Sweden Democrats	Västernorrland County
	Kevin Sahlin	Sweden Democrats	Västernorrland County
	Elise Ryder Wikén	Moderate Party	Jämtland County
	Kalle Olsson	Social Democrats	Jämtland County
	Anna-Caren Sätherberg	Social Democrats	Jämtland County
	Peter Eriksson	Sweden Democrats	Jämtland County
	Edward Riedl	Moderate Party	Västerbotten County
	Julia Algotsson	Centre Party	Västerbotten County
	Veronica Kerr	Christian Democrats	Västerbotten County
	Isak From	Social Democrats	Västerbotten County
	Malin Malm	Social Democrats	Västerbotten County
	Bjorn Wiechel	Social Democrats	Västerbotten County
	Caroline Täljeblad	Left Party	Västerbotten County
	Nils Seye Larsen	Green Party	Västerbotten County
	Sara Gille	Sweden Democrats	Västerbotten County
	Mattias Karlsson	Moderate Party	Norrbotten County
	Linda Frohm	Moderate Party	Norrbotten County
	Ida Karkiainen	Social Democrats	Norrbotten County
	Fredrik Lundh Sammeli	Social Democrats	Norrbotten County
	Samuel Pettersson Frank	Social Democrats	Norrbotten County
	Birger Lahti	Left Party	Norrbotten County
	Leonid Yurkovskiy	Sweden Democrats	Norrbotten County
	Eric Palmqvist	Sweden Democrats	Norrbotten County

== Resigned members and new members ==
Below are listed members who resigned and new members during the term of office.

No.	Resigned member	Took office	Left office	Party	Constituency	New member
67	Karin Karlsbro	28 September 2026	28 September 2026	Liberals	Stockholm County	Anders Ekegren
93	Meit Fohlin	28 September 2026	6 October 2026	Social Democrats	Gotland County	Filip Reinhag
21	Lars Püss	28 September 2026	14 October 2026	Moderate Party	Halland County	Niclas Nilsson
99	Jimmy Jansson	28 September 2026	20 October 2026	Social Democrats	Södermanland County	Åsa Kullgren
17	Linus Bylund	28 September 2026	10 November 2026	Sweden Democrats	Stockholm Municipality	Arin Karapet

== Substitutes ==
No.	Substitute	Took office	Left office	Party	Constituency	Ordinary member
230	Dennis Alvdén	28 September 2026	Incumbent	Moderate Party	Västra Götaland County West	Camilla Waltersson Grönvall
40	Yusuf Aydin	28 September 2026	Incumbent	Christian Democrats	Stockholm County	Jakob Forssmed
273	Lotta Björklund	28 September 2026	Incumbent	Moderate Party	Värmland County	Pål Jonson
31	Charlotte Broberg	28 September 2026	Incumbent	Moderate Party	Stockholm Municipality	Gunnar Strömmer
20	Anders Ekegren	28 September 2026	28 September 2026	Liberals	Stockholm Municipality	Lotta Edholm
286	Hans Eklind	28 September 2026	Incumbent	Christian Democrats	Örebro County	Ebba Busch
37	Merit Frost Lindberg	28 September 2026	Incumbent	Moderate Party	Stockholm Municipality	Benjamin Dousa
7	Sophia Granswed Baat	28 September 2026	Incumbent	Moderate Party	Stockholm Municipality	Jessica Rosencrantz
228	Pär Gustafsson	28 September 2026	Incumbent	Liberals	Malmö Municipality	Simona Mohamsson
54	Elin Hjelmestam	28 September 2026	28 September 2026	Liberals	Stockholm County	Nina Larsson
225	Johanna Holmdahl	28 September 2026	Incumbent	Christian Democrats	Gothenburg Municipality	Elisabet Lann
6	Lotta Högström	28 September 2026	Incumbent	Moderate Party	Stockholm Municipality	Johan Forssell
191	Lars Johnsson	28 September 2026	Incumbent	Moderate Party	Skåne County Northern and Eastern	Maria Malmer Stenergard
93	Alice Landerholm	28 September 2026	Incumbent	Moderate Party	Södermanland County	Ulf Kristersson
28	Martin Melin	28 September 2026	28 September 2026	Liberals	Stockholm County	Romina Pourmokhtari
280	Tony Ring	28 September 2026	Incumbent	Moderate Party	Örebro County	Elisabeth Svantesson
46	Alexander Rosenberg	28 September 2026	Incumbent	Moderate Party	Stockholm County	Niklas Wykman
301	Katarina Stenström Ros	28 September 2026	Incumbent	Moderate Party	Dalarna County	Carl-Oskar Bohlin
72	Maria Stockhaus	28 September 2026	Incumbent	Moderate Party	Stockholm County	Parisa Liljestrand
69	Marcus Willershausen	28 September 2026	28 September 2026	Liberals	Stockholm County	Johan Britz
153	Zinaida Kajevic	28 September 2026	Incumbent	Social Democrats	Malmö Municipality	Rose-Marie Carlsson
203	Niclas Nilsson	28 September 2026	Incumbent	Moderate Party	Halland County	Helena Storckenfeldt
103	Magdalena Hermelin	28 September 2026	Incumbent	Moderate Party	Östergötland County	Andreas Norlén
156	Tony Rahm	28 September 2026	Incumbent	Moderate Party	Malmö Municipality	Noria Manouchi
28	Elin Hjelmestam	28 September 2026	Incumbent	Liberals	Stockholm County	Romina Pourmokhtari
20	Martin Melin	28 September 2026	Incumbent	Liberals	Stockholm Municipality	Lotta Edholm
69	Louise Minnhagen	28 September 2026	Incumbent	Liberals	Stockholm County	Johan Britz
54	Marcus Willershausen	28 September 2026	Incumbent	Liberals	Stockholm County	Nina Larsson
321	Mats Hellhoff	1 October 2026	Incumbent	Sweden Democrats	Västernorrland County	Angelika Bengtsson
156	Tony Rahm	7 October 2026	Incumbent	Moderate Party	Malmö Municipality	Noria Manouchi
315	Linnéa Wickman	12 October 2026	Incumbent	Social Democrats	Gävleborg County	Kristoffer Lindberg
203	Sara Fladje	15 October 2026	Incumbent	Moderate Party	Halland County	Helena Storckenfeldt
57	Leif Gripestam	20 October 2026	21 October 2026	Moderate Party	Stockholm County	Josefin Malmqvist
177	Edmir Mehmeti	21 October 2026	Incumbent	Moderate Party	Skåne County Southern	Louise Meijer
46	Leif Gripestam	21 October 2026	Incumbent	Moderate Party	Stockholm County	Niklas Wykman
57	Marten Blix	21 October 2026	Incumbent	Moderate Party	Stockholm County	Josefin Malmqvist
313	Linnéa Wickman	28 October 2026	Incumbent	Social Democrats	Gävleborg County	Patrik Lundqvist
315	Jim Svensk Larm	28 October 2026	Incumbent	Social Democrats	Gävleborg County	Kristoffer Lindberg
262	Thomas Morell	2 November 2026	Incumbent	Sweden Democrats	Västra Götaland County East	Josef Fransson
