= Elin Hjelmestam =

Swedish politician (born 1999)

Member of the Riksdag
- Incumbent
- Assumed office 28 September 2026
- Constituency: Stockholm Municipality

First Vice President of the Liberal Youth Union
- In office 11 August 2024 – 8 August 2025
- Succeeded by: Marcus Willershausen

Personal details
- Born: Elin Hedda Susan Ellner; 2 August 1999 (age 27) Katarina Parish, Stockholm, Sweden
- Party: Liberals
- Education: KTH Royal Institute of Technology

Elin Hedda Susan Hjelmestam (née; Ellner; born 2 August 1999) is a Swedish politician from the Liberals. She has been a member of the Riksdag since 2026, elected for the Stockholm Municipality constituency.

== Biography ==
Hjelmestam was born in Stockholm and studied at the Royal Institute of Technology. She has been active as a municipal politician in the municipality of Stockholm.

Hjelmestam has been vice-chair of the Environmental and Health Protection Committee in the City of Stockholm. She has also been involved in the Liberal Youth Union and was first vice-chair of the union between 2024 and 2025.

In the 2026 Swedish general election, Hjelmestam ran for the Liberals. She has served as a member of parliament (statsrådsersättare) since 28 September 2026.

== See also ==
- List of members of the Riksdag, 2026–2030
