= Anders Ekegren =

Swedish politician (born 1957)

Member of the Riksdag
- Incumbent
- Assumed office 28 September 2026
- Preceded by: Karin Karlsbro
- Constituency: Stockholm Municipality
- In office 24 February 2025 – 2026
- Constituency: Stockholm County

Personal details
- Born: 27 February 1957 (age 69) Gothenburg, Sweden
- Party: Liberals
- Education: Stockholm University

Anders Ekegren (born 27 February 1957) is a Swedish lawyer and politician from the Liberals. Ekegren has been a member of the Riksdag for the Liberals since 2025, representing the Stockholm Municipality constituency. He is the party's tax and senior policy spokesperson.

== Biography ==
=== Background ===
Ekegren was born and raised in Gothenburg. He was an economics high school student. He became involved in the then Folkpartiet in 1976, party leader Per Ahlmark convinced him that "the two legs of liberalism – market economy and social responsibility were the right thing". He moved to Solna in 1983 and took a law degree from Stockholm University in the mid-1980s. Ekegren has worked as a negotiator and advisor in Akavia's negotiation department. He also represents Akavia in the Akademikeralliansen.

=== Political career ===
Ekegren was a municipal councilor in Solna from 1989 to 1994 and 2003–2014, chairman of the urban planning committee and first vice chairman of the municipal executive board.

Ekegren became the acting chairman of the municipal board in 2006 after the death of Anders Gustâv (M). Lars-Erik Salminen (M) succeeded him as chairman. He was again appointed acting chairman in 2011 after Salminen was indicted for bribery. Salminen then became chairman again after his acquittal in the district court and the court of appeal.

He served on the Stockholm County Council at the end of the 2011–2014 term. Between 2007 and 2014 he was chairman of the board of Film Capital Stockholm. From 2018 to 2022 he was chairman of the board of the municipal Film City Culture Foundation.

In February 2025, Ekegren became a member of the Riksdag for the Stockholm Municipality constituency. He succeeded party colleague Anna Starbrink who left to become Director General of the Swedish Civil Contingencies Agency. He was a deputy minister to Minister of Climate and Environment Romina Pourmokhtari and a member of the Committee on Taxation. Following the 2026 Swedish general election, he took the seat from Karin Karlsbro in Stockholm County.

== See also ==
- List of members of the Riksdag, 2022–2026
- List of members of the Riksdag, 2026–2030
