= Bylund =

Bylund is a surname. Notable people with the surname include:

- Ingamay Bylund (1947–2025), Swedish equestrian and Olympic medallist
- Jonas Bylund (born 1963), Swedish classical trombonist
- Linus Bylund (born 1978), Swedish politician
- Tuulikki Koivunen Bylund (born 1947), Finnish-born Swedish theologian, bishop of Härnösand
