= Det som varit ÄR =

Studio album by Hel
- Released: 2003
- Genre: Viking rock
- Label: Hel Records

Det som varit ÄR is a Viking rock album, released by Hel in 2003, from the label Hel Records.

== Track listing ==
1. Doften av ångest
2. Spikar i mitt hjärta
3. För evigt farväl
4. Vildjursjakt
5. Moders barm
6. Skrivet i mitt blod
7. Två världar
8. Den frälste
9. Timglas
10. Fria Norr
