= Marcus Willershausen =

Swedish politician (born 2000)

Member of the Riksdag
- Incumbent
- Assumed office 28 September 2026
- Constituency: Stockholm County

Personal details
- Born: 2000 (age 25–26) Sweden
- Party: Liberals

Karl Marcus Willershausen (born 2000) is a Swedish politician from the Liberals. He has been a deputy in the Riksdag since 2026.

== Biography ==
Willershausen lives in Solna municipality and works as political secretary for the Liberal Party in Upplands Väsby Municipality.

He has been active in the Liberal Youth Union (LUF) and was elected as a member of the union board in 2022. He has previously been the district chairman of LUF Storstockholm. In 2025, he was elected first vice chairman of the Liberal Youth Union and is also the union's foreign and defense policy spokesperson.

=== Political career ===
Willershausen ran for the Liberal Party in the 2022 Swedish general election. Ahead of the 2026 Swedish general election, he was in eleventh place on the Liberal Party's parliamentary list in Stockholm County.

On 21 September 2026, the electoral authority appointed Willershausen as a substitute member of parliament for the Liberals in the Stockholm County constituency. The appointment is valid from 28 September 2026 until the next elected parliament convenes. At the session of the parliament on 28 September 2026, he served as a substitute fo Johan Britz, and from 29 September for Nina Larsson.

== See also ==
- List of members of the Riksdag, 2026–2030
