= Hermelin =

Hermelin may refer to:

- Beate Hermelin (1919-2007), German-born experimental psychologist
- Magdalena Hermelin (born 1975), Swedish politician
- Paul Hermelin, French businessman and CEO of Capgemini
- Hermelín, cheese made in Sedlčany, the Czech Republic
- S73 Hermelin, Gepard-class fast attack craft of the German Navy
- Hermelinda Urvina (1905–2008), first Ecuadorian woman to obtain a pilot's license, issued in the United States in 1932.
