= Henrik Edin =

Swedish politician (born 1989)

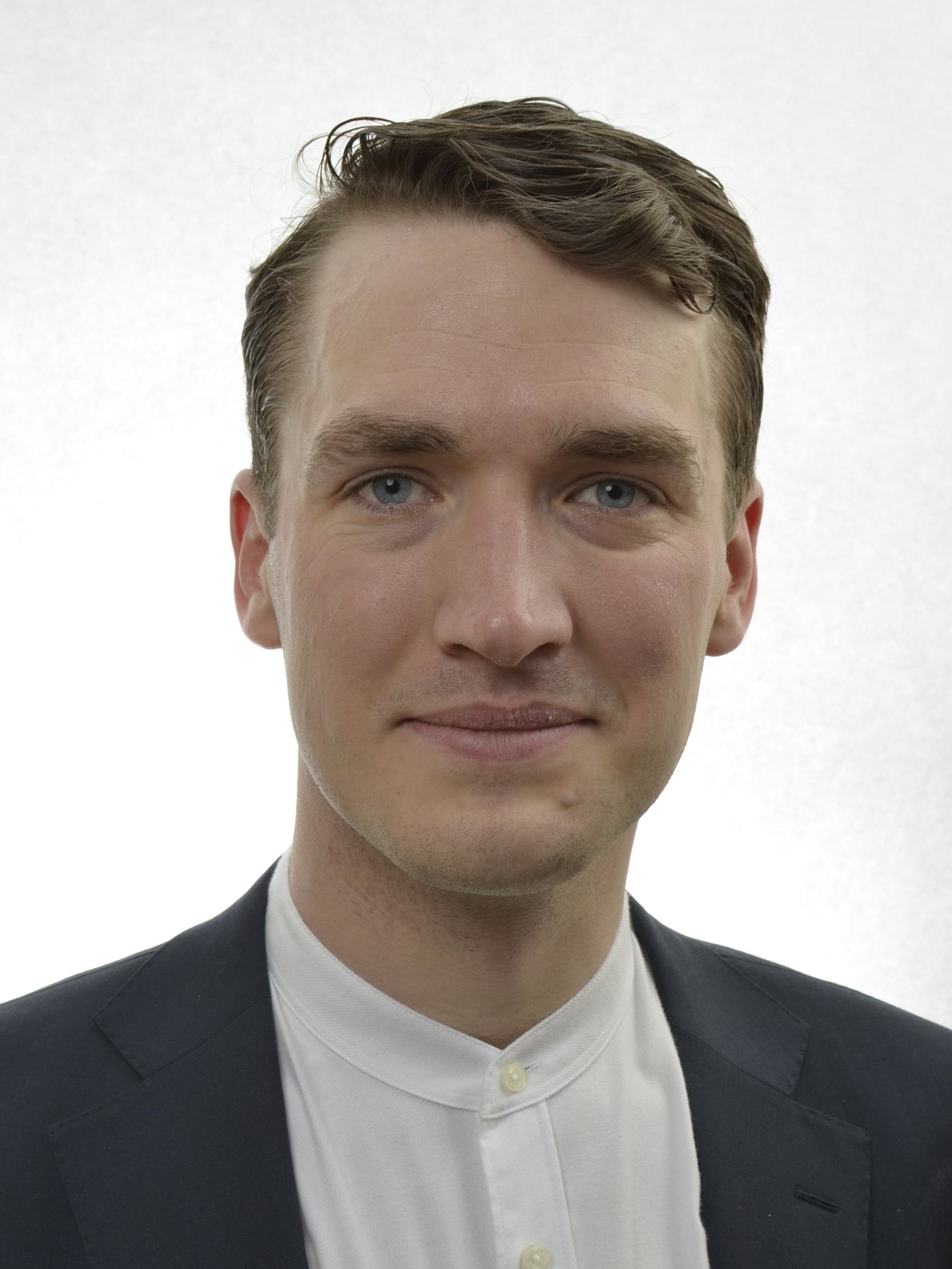
- Riksdag portrait, 2019

Member of the Riksdag
- In office March 13, 2019 – May 16, 2019 Substituting for Robert Hannah
- Constituency: Gothenburg Municipality

Chair of the Liberal Youth of Sweden
- In office August 8, 2015 – August 6, 2016
- Preceded by: Linda Nordlund
- Succeeded by: Joar Forssell

Personal details
- Born: Carl Henrik Wilhelm Edin; April 13, 1989 (age 36) Johannebergs församling, Gothenburg, Sweden
- Party: Liberals

Carl Henrik Wilhelm Edin (born 1989) is a Swedish politician who served as a substitute member of the Riksdag (MP) for the Liberals between March and May 2019. Previously, Edin chaired the party's youth wing—the Liberal Youth of Sweden—from 2015 to 2016.

== Life and career ==
Carl Henrik Wilhelm Edin was born on April 13, 1989, in Johannebergs församling, Gothenburg, and grew up on the island of Styrsö. In 2019, Edin told Mitt i Göteborg that he had moved around both within Sweden and abroad, but that he always finds himself drawn back to the Swedish archipelagos.

=== Liberal Youth of Sweden ===
Edin was a board member of the Liberal Youth of Sweden (LUF), the youth wing of the Liberals. In August 2015, he helped organize an opposition campaign to the Sweden Democrats at a subway station in Östermalmstorg. In response to an advertising campaign by SD at the location, Edin and other members of the LUF handed out flyers with the message: "Ledsen för det löjliga meddelandet i taket. Vi har ett stort problem med ett rasistiskt parti i riksdagen" (transl. "Sorry for the ridiculous message on the ceiling. We have a big problem with a racist party in our Riksdag").

Edin was elected chairman of the LUF by a vote 47-45 at the 2015 annual congress. He beat out the selection committee's endorsed candidate, Anton Wemander Grahm. Upon his election as chairman, Edin clarified his stance on the legalization of bestiality, which was an issue debated amongst the youth wing. Edin stated that the congress were actively in debate on how well animal rights laws in Sweden are protecting animals and had concluded that the law on bestiality was redundant, but remarked that he was personally uninterested in the issue. As chairman, Edin was involved in the leadership of the parent Liberals party.

Edin lost re-election for chair to Joar Forssell at the 2016 congress, in a vote 60-38. To Aftonbladet, Edin said he was "greatly disappointed" by his loss and worried that battles for the chairperson post could have negative effect on the youth wing and democracy.

=== Riksdag ===
Edin was chosen as the Liberals' third candidate for the Riksdag in Gothenburg Municipality in the 2018 and 2022 general elections. In a political compass test for Sveriges Television in 2022, Edin described himself as neither left-wing nor right-wing, and opposed cooperating with the Sweden Democrats in parliament. Edin was not elected in either election, but was named as a reserve member to MP Robert Hannah.

Whilst inactive as a reserve member, Edin worked as a consultant on hiring at IT and telecommunications companies. From March–May 2019, Edin served in the Riksdag whilst Hannah took paternity leave.

== See also ==
- List of members of the Riksdag, 2018–2022

Party political offices
Preceded by Linda Nordlund	Chair of the Liberal Youth of Sweden; 2015–2016	Succeeded by Joar Forssell
