= Hel (band) =

Swedish Viking rock band

- Origin: Eskilstuna, Sweden
- Genres: Viking rock
- Years active: 1999–present
- Labels: Ultima Thule Records, Peanut Music AB

Hel is a Swedish Viking rock band, based in Eskilstuna, Södermanland, Sweden. The band's name is derived from the Norse goddess Hel.

== History ==
Hel formed in 1999 following the disintegration of Völund Smed, three of the Hel's five members having previously played in that band. A major change from Völund Smed's lineup was that Hel would feature two female vocalists, Malin Pettersson and Ulrica Pettersson. The first release of Hel's material was on the vikingarock compilation album, Carolus Rex IV. As a result of the compilation's commercial success, Hel was initially signed to vikingrock group Ultima Thule's label, Ultima Thule Records, but later formed their own label, Peanut Music AB.

The band toured internationally between 2001 and 2004, finally breaking up following the departure of violinist Cia Hedmark in 2004 to reform Völund Smed.

In 2008, Malin Pettersson, Ulrica Pettersson, and Adde Norlin debuted a new band called Tales of Origin. Whereas Hel sang in Swedish, Tales of Origin sings in English. Their first album was titled "Through Virgin Eyes."

== Band members ==
- Ulrica Pettersson: vocals
- Malin Pettersson: vocals, guitar
- Esa Rosenström: guitar
- Piere Karlsson: drums
- Stefan Johansson: bass
- Adde Norlin: vocals, acoustic- & electric guitar, bass, cello, piano, accordion, flute
- Cia Hedmark: violin

== Discography ==
=== Studio albums ===
- Valkyriors dom (1999)
- Blodspår (2001)
- Bortglömda tid (2002)
- Det som varit ÄR (2003)

=== Appearances on compilation albums ===
- Carolus Rex IV (1999)
- Genom eld och aska (split CD with Ultima Thule) (2000)
- Carolus Rex V (2001)
- Carolus Rex VI (2002)
- Carolus Rex VII (2004)
- Carolus Rex VIII (2006)

=== Video ===
- Hel - Live (DVD) (2005)
