= Germanophile =

Someone with a strong interest in or love of German people, culture, and history

Present day flag of Germany

A Germanophile, Teutonophile, Teutophile, or Deutschophile is a person who is fond of German culture, German language, German people and Germany in general, or who exhibits German patriotism in spite of not being either an ethnic German or a German citizen. The love of the German way, called "Germanophilia" or "Teutonophilia", is the opposite of Germanophobia.

== History ==
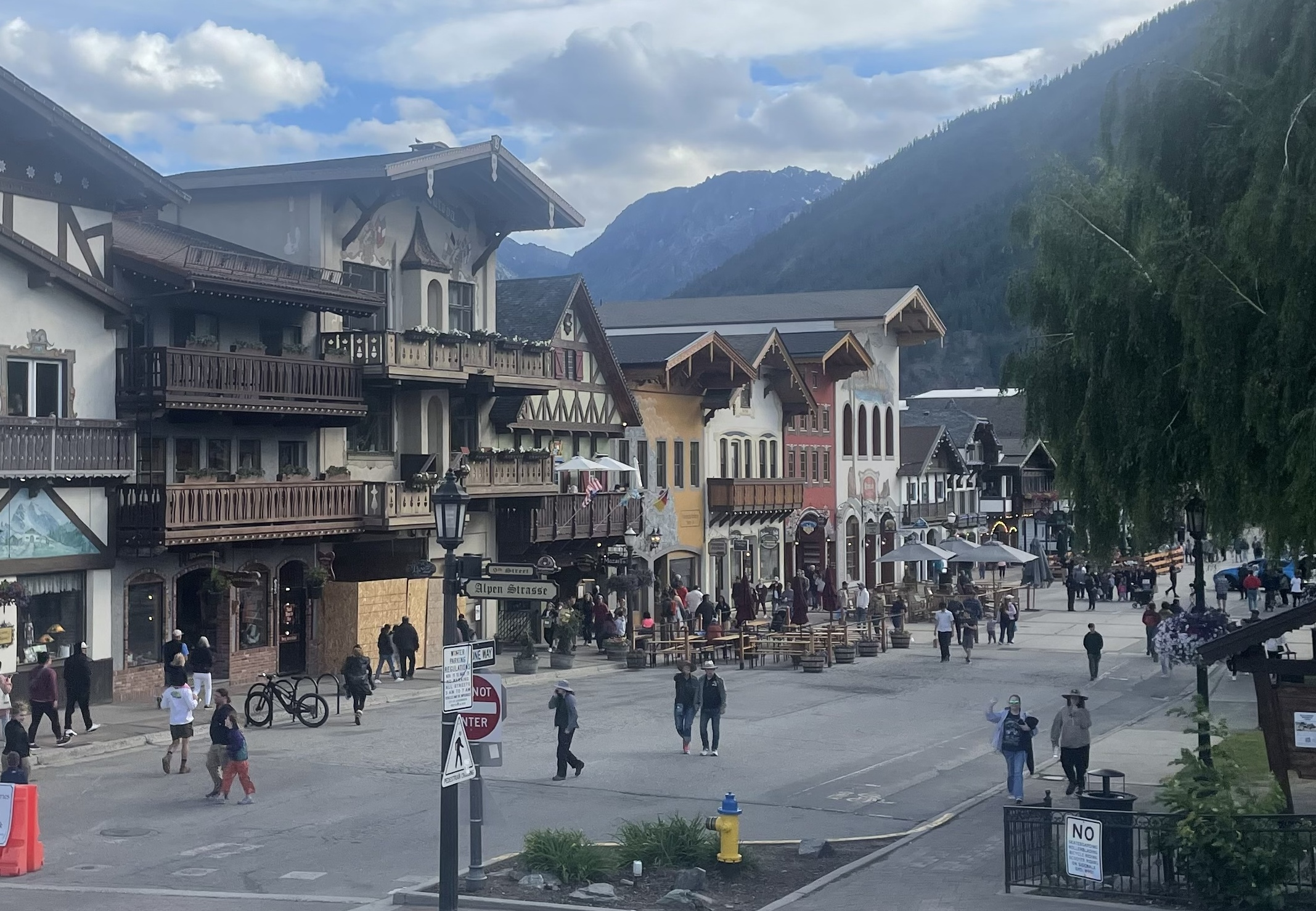
The town of Leavenworth in the U.S. state of Washington is modeled after a Bavarian village.

The term "Germanophile" came into common use in the 19th to 20th centuries – after the 1871 formation of the German Empire and its subsequent rise in importance.

In 19th-century romanticism in Britain, the term's antonym was Scandophile, expressing a dichotomy of associating "Anglo-Saxon" culture either with continental West Germanic culture or with North Germanic (Scandinavian) culture (the "Viking revival"). With an affinity to "Teutonic" or Germanic culture and worldview seen as opposed to a predilection for Classical Antiquity.

In 19th-century Continental Europe, the dichotomy was rather between Germany and France, the main political players of the period, and a Germanophile would choose to side with Germany against French or "Romance" interests taken to heart by a Francophile. The corresponding term relating to England is Anglophile, an affinity, in turn, often observed in early-20th-century Germans choosing to side against French influence.

This term was also popularly used in the 20th century to refer to admirers and adherents of the Prussian model of higher education created by Wilhelm von Humboldt (1767–1835), which were leading in the early 1800s and widely adopted by elite universities from Oslo to Harvard.

A number of Serb elites in the 19th century and in the interwar period were staunch Germanophiles.

Argentine poet and writer Jorge Luis Borges was a self-described Germanophile. During World War I, while his family was living in Geneva, in neutral Switzerland, Borges taught himself to speak and read the German language so that he could read the writings of Romantic poet Heinrich Heine in the original language. In later years, Borges cited many other German poets and philosophers as a major influence upon his own ideas and writings. Even in the essays that attacked Adolf Hitler and the Nazi Party, Borges described himself as a Germanophile. Borges further accused the Nazis of rewriting German history, of savagely distorting the interpretation of German literature, and of criminally corrupting German culture. While Borges expressed support for the Allies during World War II, he expressed concern that Western civilization might not be able to do without the achievements and contributions of the German people and that, he warned, was why their corruption by the teachings of hatred was such a horrible crime.

Egyptian-born Ottoman military officer Aziz Ali al-Misri was a self-described Germanophile. He stated in an interview with Al-Ahram that after he learned of the German surrender in 1919 following WWI, he fell into a depression and considered committing suicide. He would later try to go to Germany by various means during WWII without success.

== See also ==
- Germanophobia
- Germanisation
- Germanism (linguistics)
- Prussianism
- Imperial German influence on Republican Chile
- German metal
