= Linda Nordlund =

Swedish politician

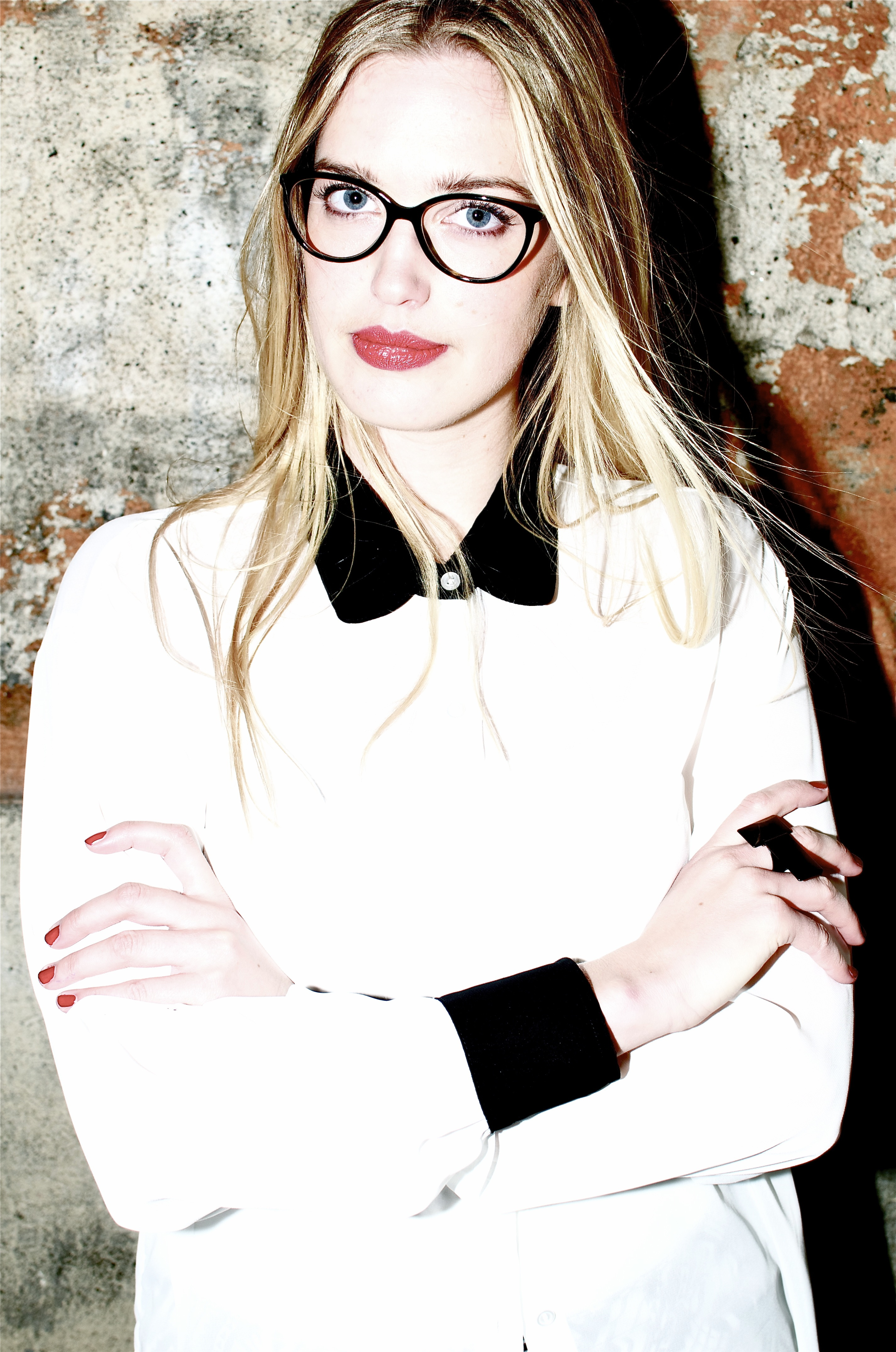
- Linda Nordlund

Chairperson of the Liberal Youth of Sweden
- In office 11 August 2012 – 7 August 2015
- Preceded by: Adam Cwejman
- Succeeded by: Henrik Edin

Personal details
- Born: 26 November 1986 (age 39)
- Party: Liberal Youth of Sweden
- Occupation: Politician

Linda Nordlund (born 26 November 1986) is a Swedish politician who was chairperson of the Liberal Youth of Sweden from 2012 to 2015. She succeeded Adam Cwejman as chairperson after the 2012 Liberal Youth of Sweden congress in Uppsala. Before she was elected chairperson she was the vice chairperson of the organisation for several years.

Linda holds a Bachelor of Political Science from Uppsala University, and was an intern at the Swedish representation in the UN.

Party political offices
Preceded by Adam Cwejman	Chairman of the Liberal Youth of Sweden; 2012–2015	Succeeded by Henrik Edin
