= Frida Johansson Metso =

Swedish politician (born 1984)

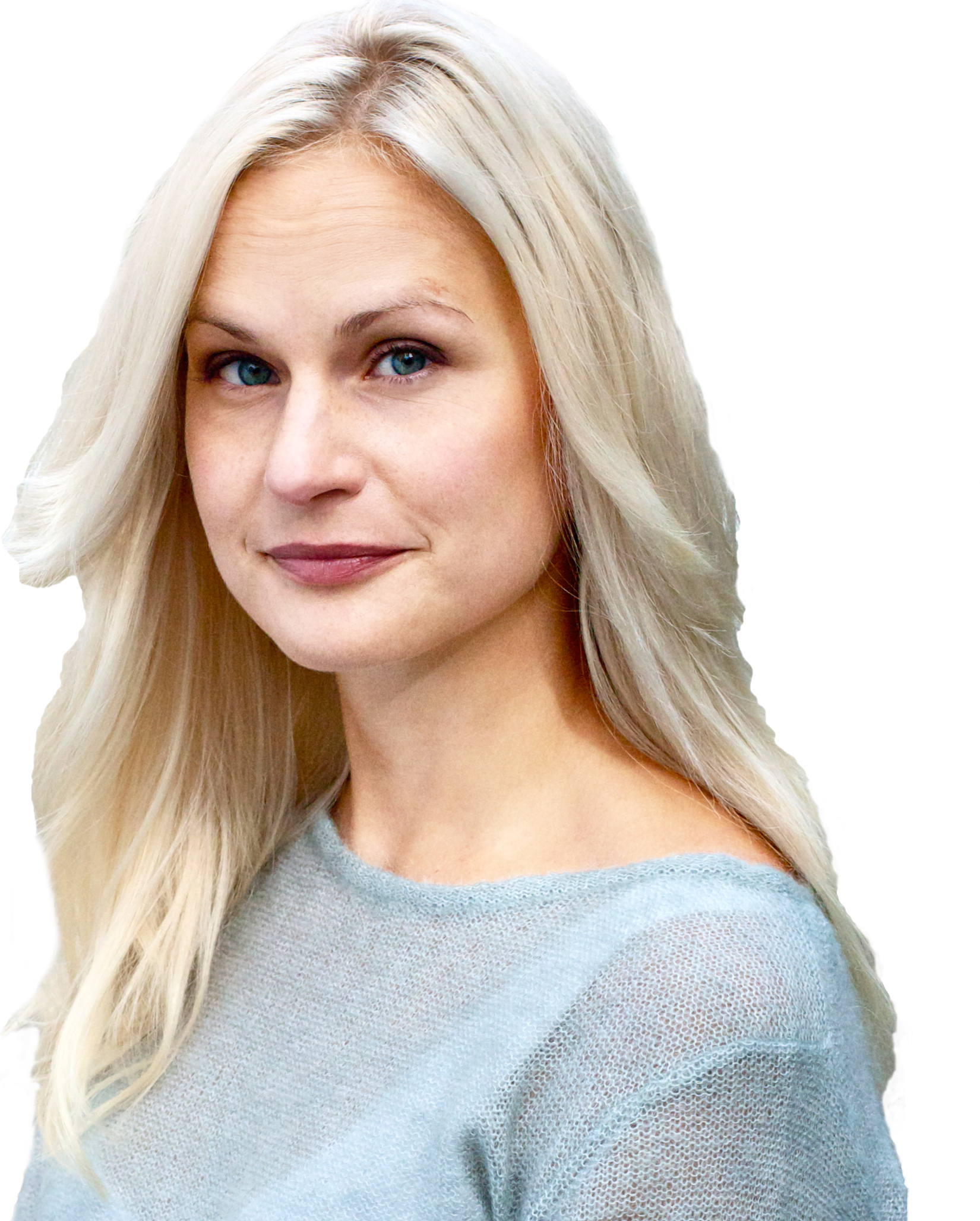
- Metso in 2013

Chairperson of the Liberal Youth of Sweden
- In office 2006–2009

Personal details
- Born: 5 September 1984 (age 41) Gothenburg, Sweden

Frida Maria Johansson Metso (born 5 September 1984) is a Swedish politician and was chairperson of the Liberal Youth of Sweden (Swedish: Liberala ungdomsförbundet, LUF) from 2006 to 2009.

== Life and career ==
Metso was born in Gothenburg. She is of Finnish descent through her mother, who moved to Sweden from Finland at the age of four. Metso lives in Uppsala, where she was studying psychology at Uppsala University until she took a sabbatical from her studies on being elected. She joined LUF at the age of 14 and has previously been chairperson of the Liberal Refugee Fund and 2nd vice chairperson of the Liberal Youth of Sweden.

She belongs to the social liberal left wing of the Liberal People's Party, also speaking in favor of Sweden as an alcoholic beverage control state. On foreign policy, however, she favours a somewhat more harsh stance, having openly criticized the authoritarian regimes of Myanmar, the People's Republic of China, Cuba and Belarus, citing Fidel Castro's 2008 relinquishing of power as the "last nail in [Castro's] coffin". She openly spoke in favour of a boycott of the 2008 Summer Olympics in Beijing, citing the numerous human rights abuses of the Chinese government as a just cause. In the election of 2006, she was elected a substitute in Uppsala County Council.

Party political offices
Preceded by Fredrik Malm	Chairperson of the Liberal Youth of Sweden; 2006 – 2009	Succeeded by Adam Cwejman
