= Gurgîn Bakircioglu =

- Bakircioglu in 2017

Member of the Riksdag
- Incumbent
- Assumed office 28 September 2026
- Constituency: Stockholm Municipality

Personal details
- Born: 24 July 1984 (age 42) Uppsala County, Sweden
- Party: Green
- Occupation: Politician, television presenter, journalist

Gurgîn Bakircioglu (born 24 July 1984) is a Swedish politician for the Green Party. He has been a member of the Swedish Parliament since 2026, elected for the Stockholm Municipality constituency. He is also known as a television presenter and journalist.

== Biography ==
Bakircioglu has Kurdish-Armenian roots. He grew up in rural Lövstalöt and attended high school in Björklinge. He has a master's degree in journalism with a focus on history.

Gurgîn Bakircioglu has worked as a TV presenter in Barnkanalen and presenter for Sveriges Televisions news and social morning program "Gomorron Sverige". He has also worked as a radio presenter at Sveriges Radio, including on P5 STHLM and on SR Metropol 93.8 where he broadcast the morning programme with, among others, Ison Glasgow and Dejan Cokorilo. Bakircioglu has previously written editorials and columns for, among others Dagens ETC, Metro, Ordfront Magasin, Världen idag and Syre.

Since 2026, he has also been a member of parliament for the Green Party.

== Lectures ==
Bakircioglu lectures on climate justice with a focus on Swedish immigrant-dense suburbs and other socio-economically disadvantaged areas. He has been a keynote speaker at A Sustainable Tomorrow 2024, the Nordic region's largest digital sustainability event, together with former prime minister Fredrik Reinfeldt.

He has also been invited by the President of the European Commission, Ursula von der Leyen, to Strasbourg to speak about climate justice for the suburbs and low-income earners. During the discussion, he, along with a statement signed by, among others, Greta Thunberg and Black Lives Matter Sweden, criticized the EU's migration agreement with Tunisia for contributing to increased climate and refugee crises. European Commission vice-president Margaritis Schinas rejected the claim but acknowledged that climate change is worsening the refugee situation.

== Documentary ==
In 2023, the SVT documentary Aldrig mer kebab (directed by Hogir Hirori) was released, depicting Bakircioglu's climate change journey, where he sold his possessions, quit his job, and bought a campervan. However, his parents questioned his new vegan minimalist lifestyle because he previously ran a kebab restaurant.

=== Podcast ===
Bakircioglu is the founder of four podcast radio programmes. "Hundpodden Vår bästa vän" which is also broadcast on Sveriges Radio P4 and P1 once a week, "Veganism är bror", "Minimalism On Wheel " and "Livet med Gurgîn och Ali Boulala".

He also made "Hej, hej Gurgin!" (2019) for Utbildningsradion, a podcast in easy Swedish where he answered questions about love, relationships and the future.

== Television ==
=== As host ===
- 2012 – Gatsmart (Utbildningsradion)
- 2013 – Retorikmatchen (Utbildningsradion)
- 2014 – Badsmart (Utbildningsradion)
- 2015 – Gomorron Sverige (numera Morgonstudion, Sveriges Television)
- 2018 – Svenska folkfester: Hammarkullekarnevalen (Sveriges Television)
- 2018 – Bästa Babblet (Utbildningsradion)
- 2021 – Sårbara platser (Utbildningsradion)
- 2022 - Järvaveckan Live (Stiftelsen Järvaveckan)

=== Participating ===
- 2023 – Aldrig mer kebab (Sveriges Television)

== Radio ==
- Metropol Morgon (Sveriges Radio) with Dejan Cokorilo, Ison Glasgow and Syster Sol.
- Talkshow with Mia and Gurgin i P4 Stockholm

== See also ==
- List of members of the Riksdag, 2026–2030

== Bibliography ==
=== Book contribution ===
- Gör skillnad!: från klimatångest till handlingskraft av Emma Sundh, Maria Soxbo, Johanna Nilsson
- Kämpa smart & dröm stort: mina 9 tips som tar dig dit du vill av Negin Azimi with Leone Milton.
- Ekonomi för en hållbar värld av Lena Amalia Bjärskog (Blue Publishing, 2025). Förord av Gurgîn Bakircioglu.
