= Per Gahrton =

Swedish politician (1943–2023)

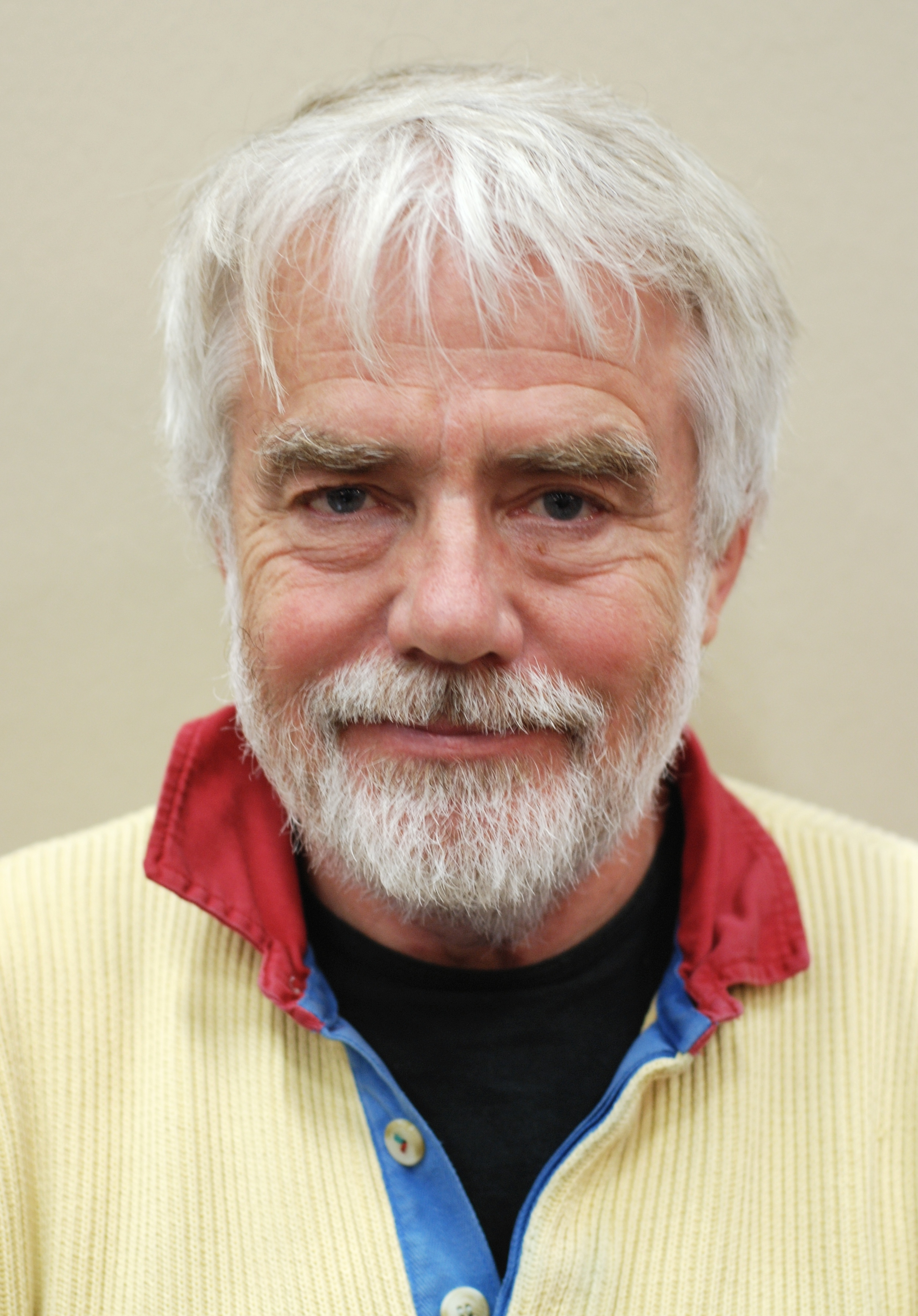

Member of Parliament
- In office 1976 to 1979, 1988 to 1991, 1994 to 1995

Member of the European Parliament
- In office 1995 to 2004

Personal details
- Born: 2 February 1943; Malmö, Sweden
- Died: 19 September 2023 (aged 80); Hörby, Sweden
- Political party: Liberal Party; Green Party

Carl Per Gunnar Gahrton (2 February 1943 – 19 September 2023) was a Swedish politician. He was a member of Parliament, holding a seat for the Liberal Party from 1976 to 1979, and for the Green Party from 1988 to 1991, and again from 1994 to 1995. Later, he was a member of the European Parliament from 1995 to 2004.

== Career ==
Early in his career, Gahrton was elected chairman of the youth and student wing of the Swedish Liberal Party, in 1969. In 1971, he was challenged for the post by Lars Leijonborg due to ideological tensions; Leijonborg succeeded him after a narrow win. Gahrton became a member of Parliament for the Liberal Party in 1976. He was re-elected in 1979 but left the parliament and the party the same year, expressing disenchantment with the parliamentary bureaucracy.

In 1981, he was one of the Swedish Green Party founders, and one of its more high-profile members for many years, one of the relatively few in the new party who had several years of prior experience in professional politics. He served as one of two spokespersons for the party from 1984 to 1985. He also served as a member of Parliament for the Green Party from 1988 to 1991 and again from 1994 to 1995. From 1995 to 2004, he was a member of the European Parliament.

Gahrton was an outspoken eurosceptic and was one of the leading proponents of the "no" side in the 1994 Swedish European Union membership referendum (which was won by the "yes" side). In 2006, he was acquitted of drunk driving charges.

As of 2010, Gahrton was the president of the Swedish Association for Solidarity with Palestine.

While serving in Parliament for the Green Party, Gahrton argued that Olof Palme was murdered by Israeli forces in order to block mediation attempts in the Middle East.

In December 2008, Gahrton sharply criticized a European Union proposal "Guidelines for strengthening the political dialogue structures with Israel", arguing that the guidelines were in fact meant to establish "a security pact with Israel." He also argued that due to "the well-known Israeli skill in lobbying and in influencing opinions worldwide, it is no exaggeration to argue that from now on and for all practical purposes the Middle East Policy of the EU will be elaborated, even co-written, by Israel."

In March 2009, Gahrton participated in a large protest against the Davis Cup match between Sweden and Israel in Malmo. Under orders from local politicians, the match was played behind closed doors. Gahrton claimed that this decision had already given demonstrators some success, stating "We have been helped by brave politicians in Malmö. We thank them for that."

Gahrton was the author of Life and Death in the European Parliament, part political thriller, part tell-all memoir. The book was criticized by fellow parliament members as being a thinly disguised rip-off of Dan Brown's The Da Vinci Code, which dominated Sweden's bestseller lists at the time, and Gahrton was accused of wanting to cash in on Brown's success. Consequently, Gahrton was forced to distribute the book free of charge.

== Personal life and death ==
Gahrton described himself as Jewish according to the traditional Jewish definition, as his matrilineal family via his maternal grandmother's mother was Jewish.

Per Garhton died on 19 September 2023, at the age of 80.

== Books ==
- Gahrton, Per (2004). Life and Death in the European Parliament. P.Gahrton. ISBN 978-91-631-5291-7.
- Gahrton, Per (15 May 2010). Georgia. London: Pluto Press. ISBN 978-0-7453-2859-1.
