= Magdalena Hermelin =

Swedish politician (born 1975)

Member of the Riksdag
- Incumbent
- Assumed office 28 September 2026
- Constituency: Östergötland County

Personal details
- Born: Anna Magdalena Jansson; 5 September 1975 (age 51) Stockholm County, Sweden
- Party: Moderate Party
- Education: Uppsala University

Anna Magdalena Hermelin (née Jansson; born 5 September 1975) is a Swedish entrepreneur, farmer and politician for the Moderate Party. She has been a serving deputy in the Riksdag since 2026, elected for the Östergötland County constituency. She is a vegetable farmer by occupation.

== Biography ==
Magdalena Jansson has a family background on the island of Gotland. Hermelin attended high school in Visby. Hermelin studied communication and media studies at Uppsala University from 1997 to 2000 and graduated with a bachelor's degree.

She worked from 2002 to 2004 as a project manager at AP Fastigheter. In 2006 she began working as a project manager at the Swedish Cancer Foundation, Cancerfonden, where she remained until 2010. Between September 2010 and January 2014 she was responsible for the foundation's corporate partnerships. She was project manager for the Pink Ribbon at Cancerfonden. When her husband Olof Hermelin took over Fallsberg farm outside Skänninge in 2007, the couple commuted between Stockholm and the farm in Östergötland County.

Around 2013, she left her job in Stockholm and moved to Fallsbergs to build up a vegetable growing business. The business is run through Hermelins gråskonser AB. The first vegetable harvest was taken in 2014.

Hermelin has also been an editorial writer at the newspaper Corren, where she has written about entrepreneurship and Swedish food production.

== Political career ==
Hermelin entered politics to advocate for small entrepreneurs in rural areas.

At the 2026 Swedish general election, Hermelin was placed fourth on the Moderate Party's parliamentary list in Östergötland County. She also ran for Mjölby City Council and was placed 16th on the Moderate Party's list.

In connection with Andreas Norlén being elected Speaker of the Riksdag after the election, Hermelin began serving in the Riksdag on 28 September 2026 as a substitute for the Östergötland County constituency.

== Personal life ==
Hermelin married Olof Hermelin on 20 January 2007 in Visby Cathedral. The couple had been together in 2005, when both lived in Stockholm. Olof Hermelin is the son of Ulf and Gertrud Hermelin, who ran Fallsberg in Skänninge. He belongs to the Hermelin noble family.

== Awards ==
- The Great Hagdahl Prize, 2024

== See also ==
- List of members of the Riksdag, 2026–2030
