= Adam Cwejman =

Swedish politician of Polish-Jewish origin

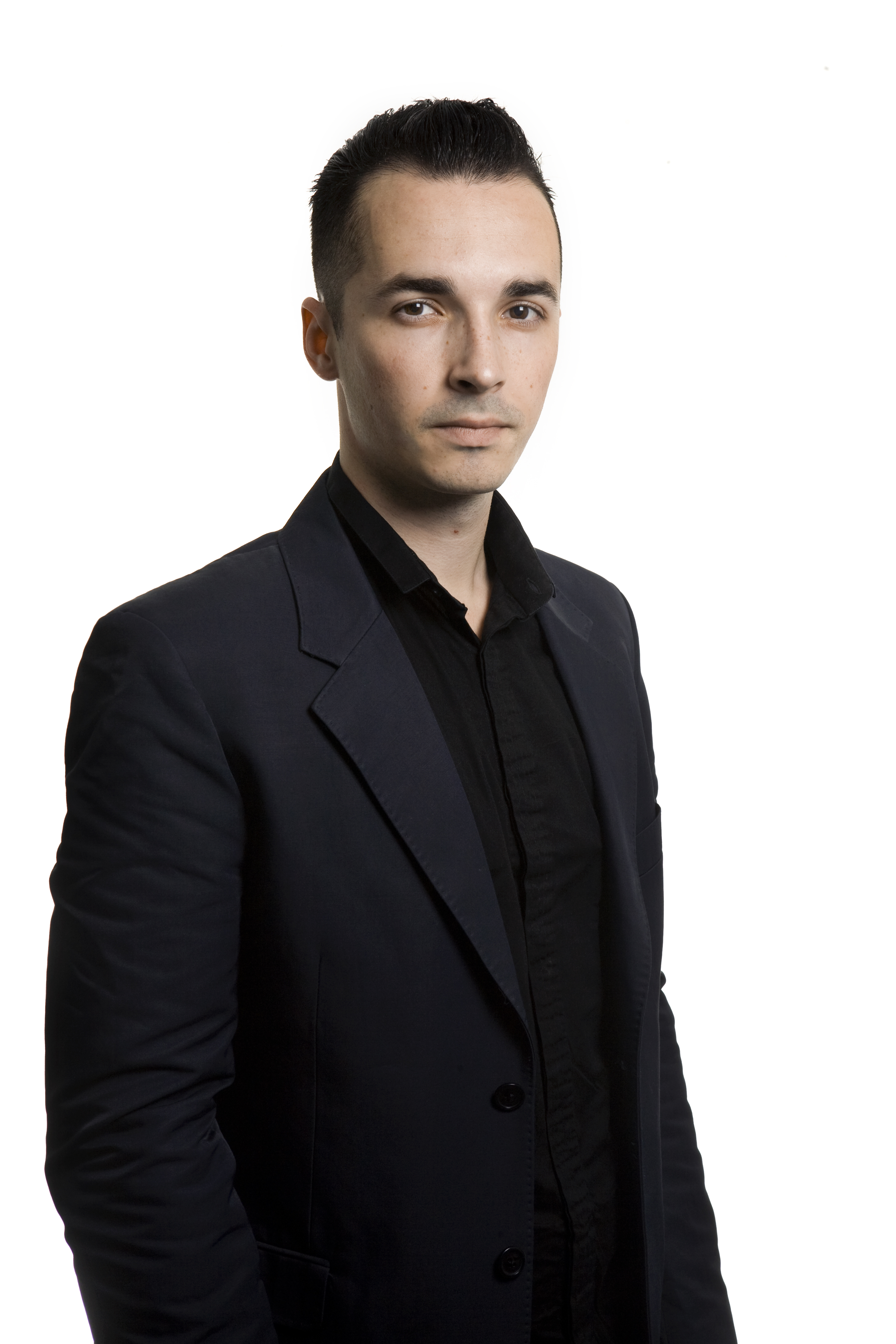

chairman of the Liberal Youth of Sweden
- In office 2009–2012

Personal details
- Born: 12 January 1985 (age 41)

Adam Michael Cwejman (born 12 January 1985 in Gothenburg) is a Swedish politician of Polish-Jewish descent.

Cwejman joined the Liberal Youth of Sweden in 2006 and became a member of the executive committee in 2008. He has also worked as an ombudsman for the organization in western Sweden. He has a B.A. in international relations from the University of Gothenburg and has also worked at Volvo, as a gardener and as a teacher of Eastern European studies. He was unanimously elected chairman of the Liberal Youth of Sweden at its congress in Nässjö on 7 August 2009. He did not contest the 2012 chairman election, which was won by Linda Nordlund.

Party political offices
| Preceded by Frida Johansson Metso | Chairman of the Liberal Youth of Sweden; 2009–2012 | Succeeded by Linda Nordlund |
