= Linus Bylund =

Swedish politician (born 1978)

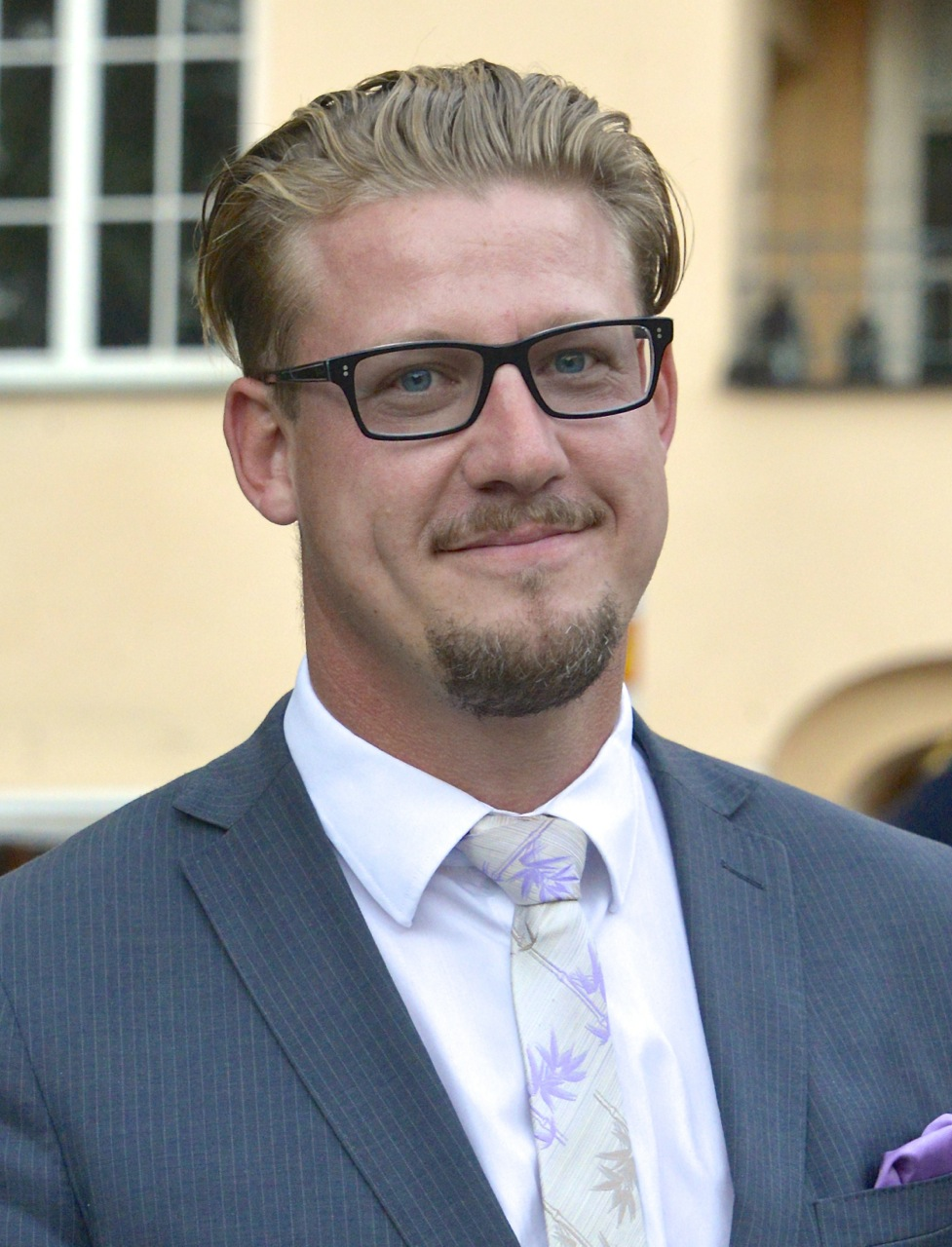
Bylund in 2014

Carl Linus Bylund (born 2 January 1978) is a Swedish politician for the Sweden Democrats (SD). Bylund was elected to the Riksdag in 2014. Prior to that, he served as press secretary for Jimmie Åkesson and chief of staff for the SD group in the Riksdag.

== Early life ==
Born in Stockholm, he lived his first year in Rinkeby and the rest of his upbringing in Reimersholme in a family that counted five children. His parents were public employees and active in the Swedish Social Democratic Party. At the age of 14, Bylund began listening to the Viking rock band Ultima Thule and this raised for him an interest in nationalism.

In 1997, he got in conflict with policemen outside a pornographic shop. This resulted in a sentence in 2002 for violence against civil servicemen.

== Political career ==
Bylund joined the Sweden Democrats in 2002.

In the 2010 local elections in Sweden, Bylund topped the Sweden Democrats' list in Stockholm, but the party did not obtain any seats on Stockholm's city council. The party did however for the first time enter the Riksdag and Bylund became press secretary for Jimmy Åkesson; a position that was later changed into a chief of staff role.

Some of Bylund's public comments have caused controversy, including a tweet on the day of the 2011 Norway attacks where he wrote "The next devil that pity all the kind Muslims when bleeding Norwegians are lying in the streets will get unfollowed". The background according to Bylund was that his Twitter feed was filled with tweets that compared the Norway attacks to various bomb attacks in the Middle East.

In the 2014 election he was member of the election preparation committee which nominated the candidates for the party’s lists in the election. Like two other members of the election committee he was at the same a candidate to the Riksdag list himself; something that attracted criticism from some of the party’s grassroots.

In 2014, he was elected to the Riksdag where he is a member of the Committee on Social insurance (Socialförsäkringsutskottet). Following Åkesson's sick leave due to burnout shortly after the election, Bylund was described in Dagens Nyheter as vital in helping Åkesson through the 2014 campaign; however, Bylund expressed that this was a myth.

Together with Tomas Ringdahl, Bylund form the rock duo Korpöga which has made several songs for the Sweden Democrats, including "Vi är på gång nu" (English: We have something going now) which was played at the Sweden Democrats' campaigns in the 2010 and 2014 Swedish general election.

== Personal life ==
Bylund has three children from a prior relationship. His interests include fishing.

Bylund regularly lunches with comedian and Sweden Democrats critic Soran Ismail; this has gathered attention and was featured in a Sveriges Radio documentary on Ismail in 2013.
