= Fredrik Malm =

Swedish politician (born 1977)

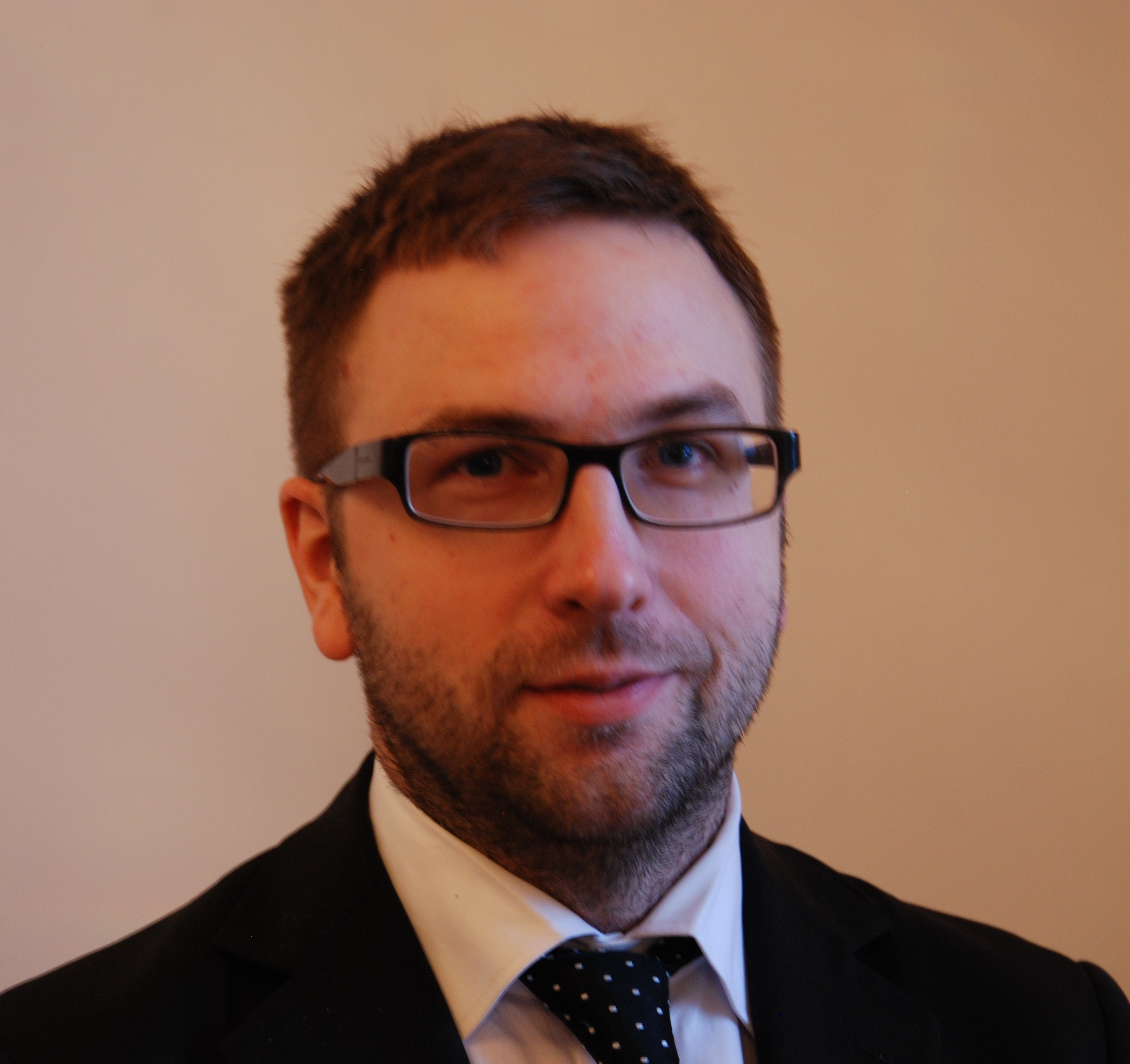

Member of Parliament
- Incumbent
- Assumed office 2006

Personal details
- Born: 2 May 1977 (age 48)
- Party: Liberal People's Party

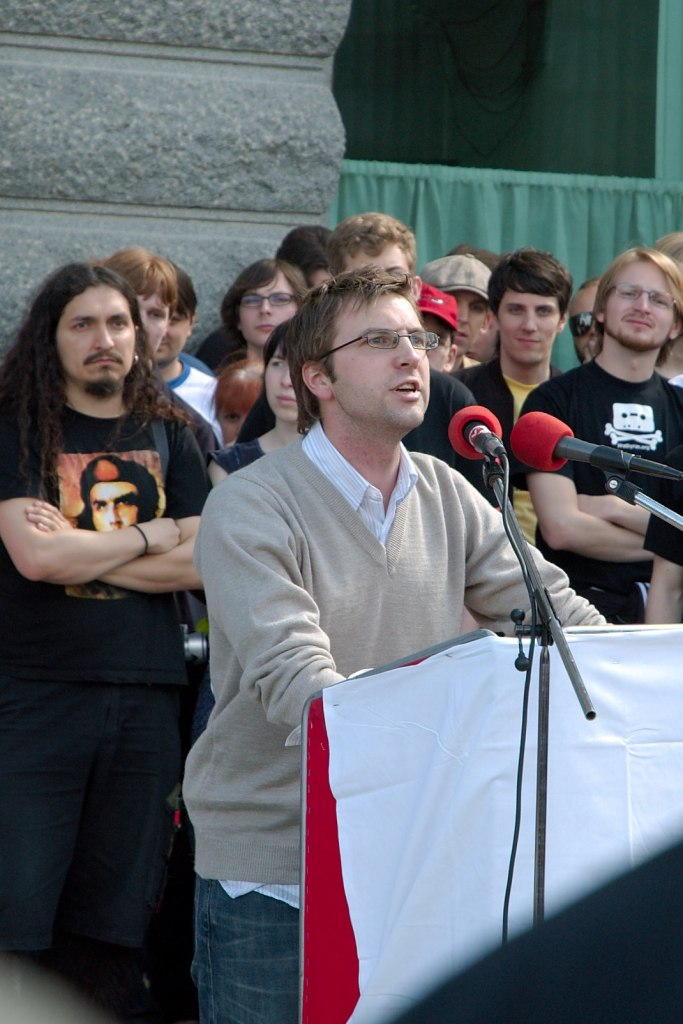
Fredrik Malm delivering a speech from Mynttorget in Stockholm during a protest in June 2006

Carl Fredrik Malm (born 2 May 1977 in Stockholm) is a Swedish politician and Member of Parliament for the Liberal People's Party. He was chairperson of the Liberal Youth of Sweden from 2002 to 2006.

He is a member of parliament since 2014. Since 2022 he is the chair of the committee of education and since November 2021 he is second vice chair of the Liberal People's Party.

== Biography ==
Fredrik Malm grew up in Skarpnäck, Stockholm. After school he worked as an editor for Swedish publications such as Expo, Upsala Nya Tidning, Eskilstuna-Kuriren, Gefle Dagblad and Liberala Nyhetsbyrån.

Malm supported the pro-EU side in the referendum regarding Swedish EU-membership in 1994. Between 1997 and 1999 Malm was the president of the Liberal youth party district of Stockholm. He was a member of Stockholm city council between 2002 - 2006 and since 2006 Malm is a member of parliament.

Malm is a supporter of an independent Kurdistan and of the democracy movement in Cuba. He started the project Cuba Free Library. In January 2006 he received the "Kurdish Friend of the Year"-award by the Kurdistan regional government.

In 2010 Malm was appointed to be the foreign affairs spokesperson for the Liberal People's party. 2021 he assumed the position of spokesperson for education and was elected to be vice chair of the committee of education.

Malm has expressed his support for the democracy movement in Iran, and is calling for tougher sanctions against the country, which he has been criticized for by Hans Linde, a member of the Left Party Since 2020, he has been serving as co-chair of the Inter-Parliamentary Alliance on China (IPAC).

Since Russia's full-scale invasion of Ukraine in February 2022 Fredrik Malm has, together with Gunnar Hökmark revived the weekly manifestations known as the "Monday movement", originally conceived as a movement in support of Baltic freedom from the Soviet Union, but this time in support of Ukraine.

== Views on foreign affairs ==
Fredrik Malm is an advocate for Ukraine in its conflict against Russia. Malm visited Kyiv in 2014, shortly after the Maidan protests, to demonstrate his support for Ukraine. Alongside former Moderate Member of the European Parliament Gunnar Hökmark and a group of volunteers, Malm revived the “Monday Movement,” which originally organized rallies at Norrmalmstorg in Stockholm in support of the Baltic states' independence from the Soviet Union. The first Monday Movement was active from March 1990 until September 1991, during which the Baltic Soviet republics gained independence.

Every Monday at 12:00 p.m., the Monday Movement gathers hundreds of attendees at Norrmalmstorg in Stockholm. The speakers include ministers, party leaders, members of parliament, Swedish and foreign diplomats, cultural figures, representatives from Ukraine, and volunteer organizations.

Fredrik Malm initiated the "Cuba's Free Library" book collection to promote freedom of speech in Cuba and has served on the board of the Sweden-Israel Friendship Society. He has also been actively involved with the Swedish Committee Against Antisemitism and has championed the rights of Kurds, Armenians, Assyrians, and other minorities in Turkey. In 2005, Malm traveled to the Kurdish region of Iraq and authored a series of articles in Expressen about his journey. In January 2006, he was named "Friend of the Kurds of the Year" at the Kurd Gala in Stockholm, organized by the Kurdistan Regional Government.

Fredrik Malm has participated in various events related to the Armenian Genocide. He criticized Swedish Foreign Minister Carl Bildt for avoiding a position on the genocide issue, arguing that the reluctance of European countries to take a stance contributes to delaying Turkish recognition. However, Malm chose not to attend when the Swedish Parliament narrowly voted to recognize the genocide in 2010, an initiative led by the opposition.

On April 27, 2011, Fredrik Malm and Member of Parliament Annelie Enochson (Christian Democrats) were awarded the Armenian Parliament's Medal of Honour for their contributions to the cause of humanity and humanism by Armenia's then-President, Serzh Sargsyan.

== Personal life ==
Malm was married to Gulan Avci, Member of Parliament for the Liberal People's Party. Together they have two children.

Party political offices
| Preceded by Birgitta Ohlsson | Chairperson of the Liberal Youth of Sweden; 2002 – 2006 | Succeeded by Frida Johansson Metso |
