= Romina Pourmokhtari =

Swedish politician (born 1995)

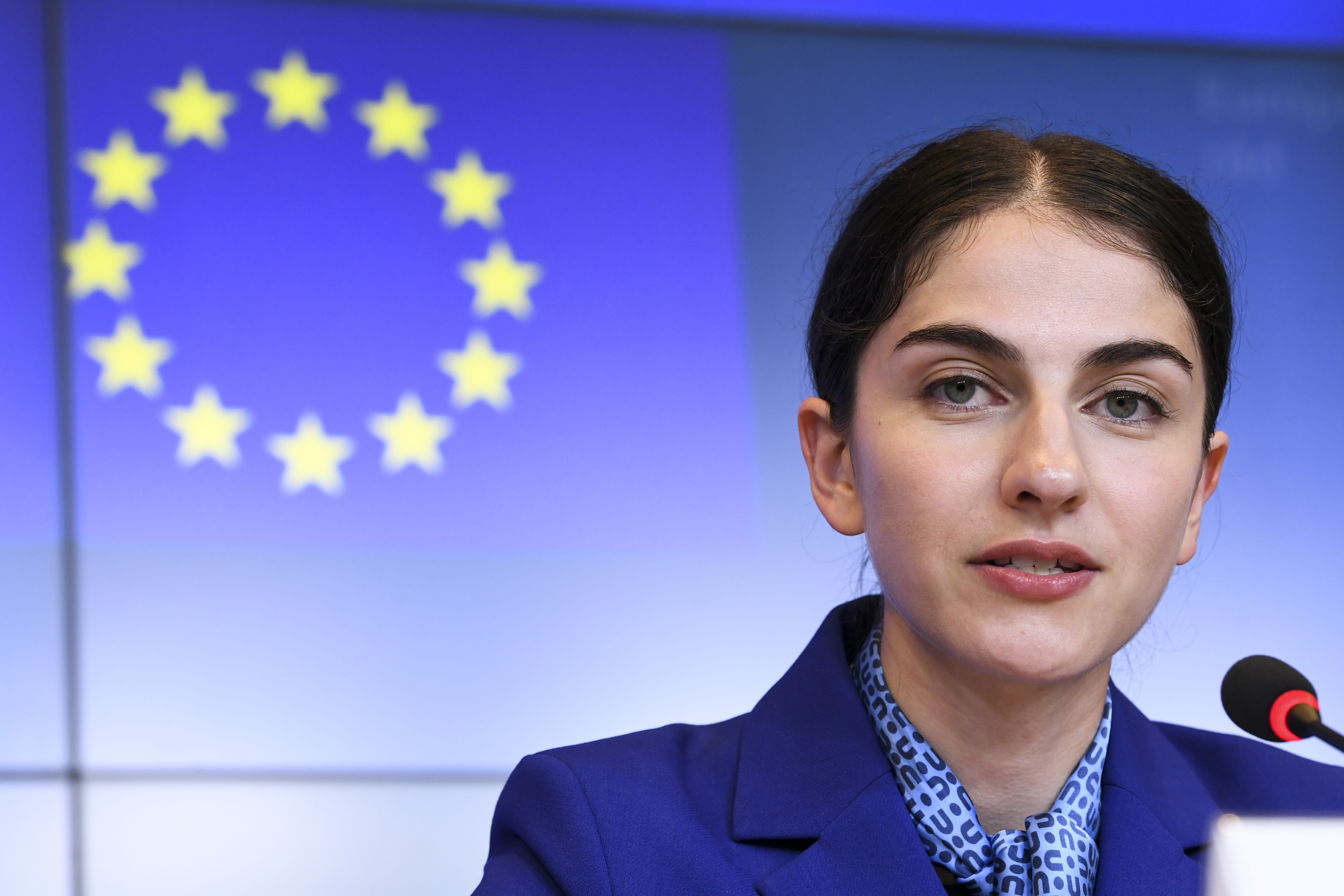
- Pourmokhtari in 2023

Minister for the Environment
- Incumbent
- Assumed office 18 October 2022
- Monarch: Carl XVI Gustaf
- Prime Minister: Ulf Kristersson
- Preceded by: Annika Strandhäll

Member of the Riksdag
- Incumbent
- Assumed office 26 September 2022
- Constituency: Stockholm Municipality

President of Liberal Youth of Sweden
- In office 19 August 2019 – 6 November 2022
- Preceded by: Joar Forssell
- Succeeded by: Erik Berg

Personal details
- Born: 12 November 1995 (age 30) Stockholm, Sweden
- Citizenship: Sweden
- Party: Liberals
- Children: 1
- Education: Uppsala University

Romina Pourmokhtari (born 12 November 1995) is a Swedish politician for the Liberals. She has served as the Minister for the Environment since 2022 in the Kristersson cabinet. She has also been a member of the Riksdag for Stockholm Municipality since 2022. She is the youngest-ever minister of a cabinet in Sweden, having ascended to her position at the age of 26.

== Political career ==
=== Liberal Youth of Sweden (2019–2022) ===
Pourmokhtari became the president of the Liberal Youth of Sweden in 2019.

In June 2021, she and the two vice-chairs of the Liberal Youth published an article in Expressen calling for the Liberal Party to "adopt red lines" against the far-right Sweden Democrats, saying that the Sweden Democrats' "vision of society and of people is infinitely more dangerous than any challenge Sweden faces today," but that after the Liberal Party members had voted to consider going into government with the Sweden Democrats, the party should not compromise on the right to asylum, the independence of universities, media, cultural institutions, and the justice system, protection for women, LGBT+ people, and minority groups, and Sweden's role in global affairs, including international aid and the European Union.

On 14 September 2022, she announced that she would step down as president at the upcoming congress in November later that year.

=== Minister for the Environment (2022–present) ===
Following the 2022 Swedish general election in September 2022, Pourmokhtari was elected to the Riksdag for Stockholm Municipality. Immediately following the election, she pledged to vote against the formation of any government that included the Sweden Democrats. She later deleted tweets where she criticized the Sweden Democrats after joining a coalition government with the party.

In October 2022, she was named Minister for the Environment in the Kristersson Cabinet, with the Liberal Party taking part in the Tidö Agreement with the Moderates, the Christian Democrats, and the Sweden Democrats. As part of the agreement, the Ministry of the Environment was downgraded from a full ministry to a department of the Ministry of Enterprise and Innovation, however, Pourmokhtari told media that there was "absolutely no drop in ambitions" for the government's environmental policy. Later that month, she was named "Sweden's most powerful politician under 30" by Expressen.

In June 2023, she faced criticism after the government's National Climate Conference featured no scientists, environmental NGOs, nor youth representatives on any of its panels. In response to the criticism, she stated that the goal of the conference was to ask business leaders about obstacles they faced to adopt more climate measures and that it would be inappropriate for the government to meet with civil disobedience groups like Extinction Rebellion.

In August 2023, Pourmokhtari announced that the government planned to build ten new nuclear reactors in the next two decades, saying that climate transition requires a doubling of electricity production." In September 2023, the Swedish government announced that it would cutting around 250 million kronor from its environmental budget and would be introducing tax cuts for petrol.

In December 2023, Pourmokhtari and Kristersson announced a new climate strategy for Sweden, aiming to reach net zero by 2045 and including an 800 million kronor increase in subsidies for green businesses as well as the potential development of electric vehicle charging port network across the country. The strategy faced criticism for failing to meet Sweden's 2030 climate goals, as well as for dropping several major points such as a planned ban on petrol car sales in 2030 to satisfy the Sweden Democrats. In response to the criticism, Kristersson stated that Pourmokhtari was "the best climate minister Sweden has ever had."

Under Pourmokhtari's tenure, the Swedish climate emissions have started increasing, with the increase of 7% in 2024 being the largest in 15 years.

Pourmokhtari stated in 2024 that she would not be a part of any possible government including the Sweden Democrats following the 2026 election. She also called the party "a racist party with nazi roots".

== Personal life ==
Pourmokhtari grew up in Sundbyberg. Her father is a political refugee from Iran, and it was through him that Romina became interested in politics. According to Pourmokhtari, her parents fled from the country "when freedom was taken from them." She supported the 2025–2026 Iranian protests, saying that "Khamenei should get on the first plane to Russia with the last money he stole from the Iranian people".

When Khamenei was killed, she commented: "I am happy and relieved that the Hitler of Iran is dead."

Pourmokhtari studied political science at Uppsala University, but later dropped out.

In an interview with Tidningen NU, she stated that her first strong political memory was during the 2009 Iranian presidential election protests.

At the age of 18, she co-founded an initiative called #NeverHaveIEverVoted, to encourage first-time voters in Sweden to participate in the 2014 EU election.

In March 2026, she announced that she was going for parental leave with her newborn child.
