= Viking revival =

Movement reflecting appreciation for Viking history and culture

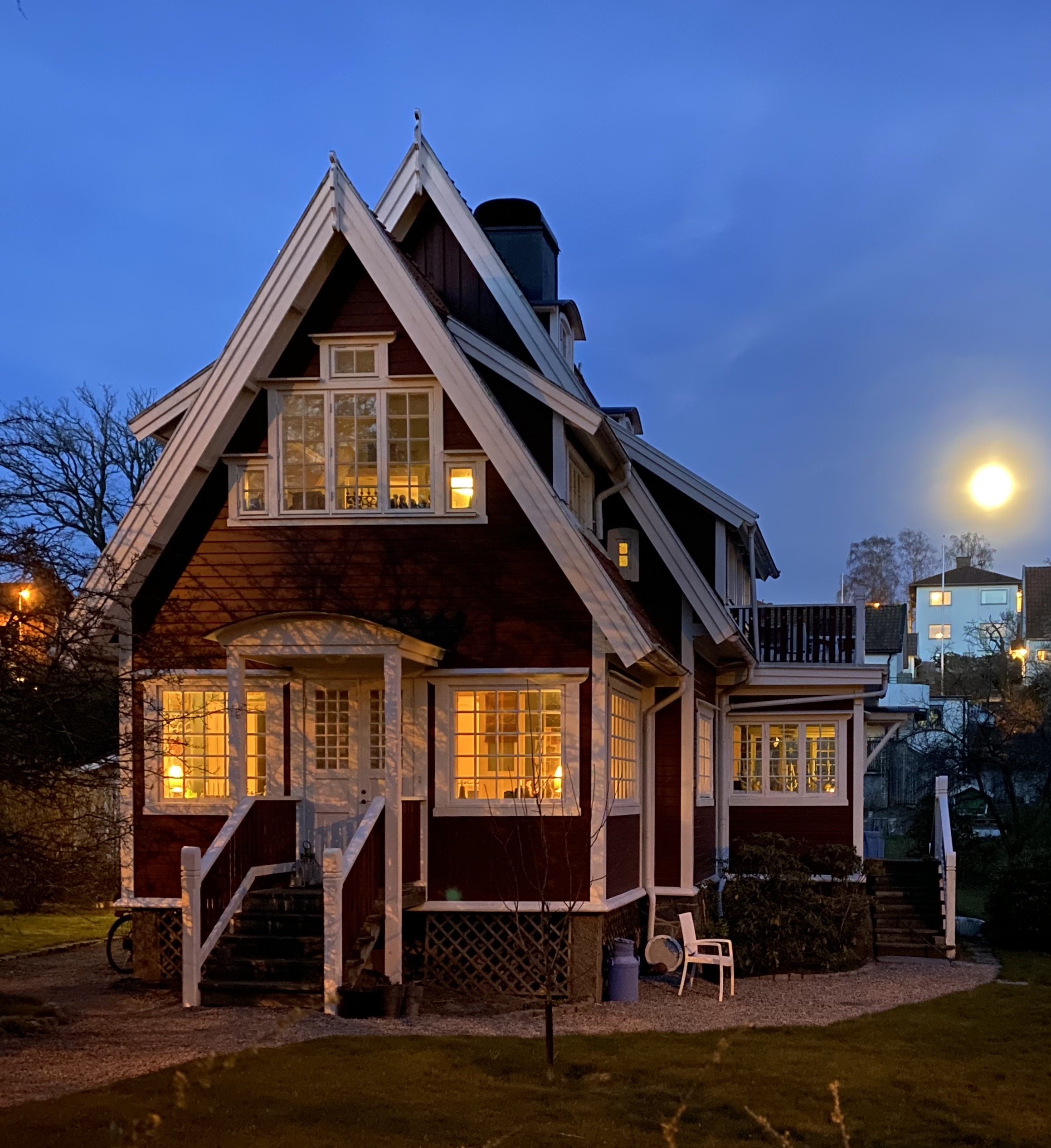
An early 20th century house in Örgryte, Gothenburg, showing characteristics of stave churches is built in Viking revival style.

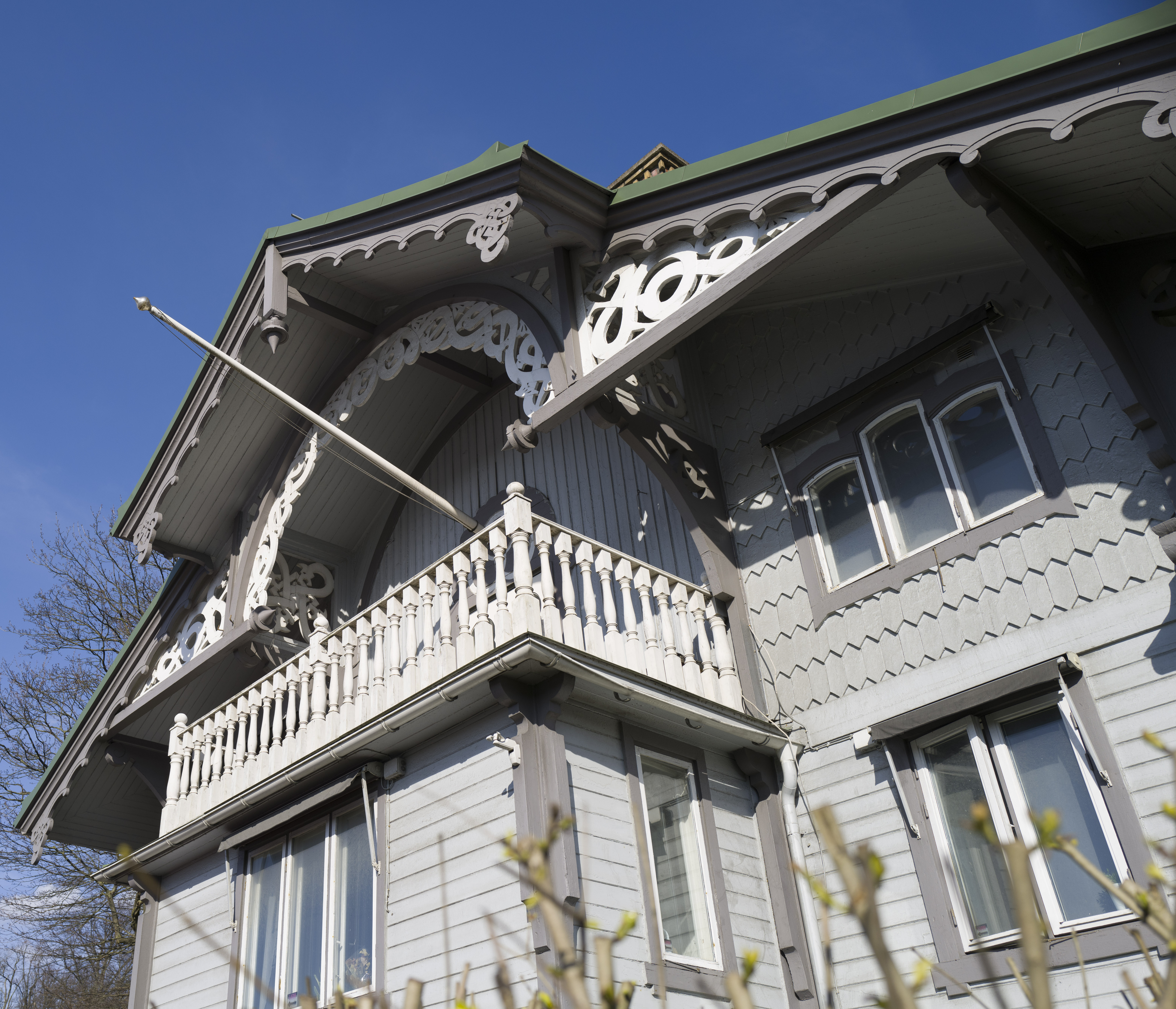
A villa near Sankt Sigfridsplan in Gothenburg has wooden carvings of drakkar (dragons), often found on runestones.

The Viking revival was a movement reflecting new interest in, and appreciation for Viking medieval history and culture. Interest was reawakened in the late 18th and 19th centuries, often with added heroic overtones typical of that Romantic era.

The revival began earlier with historical discoveries and early modern publications dealing with Old Norse culture. The first printed edition of the 13th-century Gesta Danorum or the Legend of the Danes by Saxo Grammaticus, came out in 1514 just as book printing began become more practical and printing trade was quickly spreading. Olaus Magnus's Historia de gentibus septentrionalibus, or "History of the northern peoples", was printed in 1555. The pace of publication increased during the 17th century with Latin translations of the famous Edda, notably Peder Resen's Edda Islandorum of 1665. The Edda consisted of two 13th-century Medieval Icelandic literary works on Norse mythology, written down in the 13th century, but certainly from older oral sources: they are the Prose Edda, and an older collection of poems without an original title now known as the Poetic Edda. The books are the main sources of medieval skaldic tradition of poetry and storytelling in Iceland and Norse mythology.

The word Viking is not a medieval term and was introduced into Modern English only during the 18th century. At that point in the Romantic Era, Viking exploits were aggregated and tended to be falsely subsumed under a single category and subsequently romanticized as heroic adventure. Etymologists frequently trace the word "Viking" to writers who are referring to those who set about to raid and pillage. The word Viking in the sense in which it is commonly used is derived from the Old Norse víkingr signifying a sea-rover or pirate. Thus, a modern understanding of "Viking" history is shaped by the views of the people of the Romantic era, who studied and wrote about "the Vikings" as seen from their point of view.

== Norway ==
The rediscovery of the Viking past began in Norway during the 19th century when Norway saw a rise in nationalism. Having been in a personal union with Denmark under the Danish king for 400 years and subsequently in the union between Sweden and Norway under the Swedish king, Norwegians started looking back to their Viking Age kings and sagas. In 1867, the first Viking ship to be unearthed, the Tune ship, was excavated in Østfold, Norway. The ship provided new knowledge about the Vikings and their culture. The excavation of other ships and artifacts led to a higher consciousness about the Viking past in Norway. For example, the only complete Viking helmet, the Gjermundbu helmet, ever to be found was also excavated in Buskerud, Norway. In 1880, Norway uncovered The Gokstad Ship and is a great example of ship that represents Viking Age craftsman ship. "Central to the construction of the Gokstad ship is the clinker-built method, a hallmark of Scandinavian boat-building tradition."

== Denmark ==
Danish antiquarian Carl Christian Rafn was noted for his early advocacy of the theory that the Vikings had explored North America centuries before Christopher Columbus's and John Cabot's voyages. Rafn published much of his work in 1837 in the Antiquitates Americanæ, considered the first scholarly exposition of the Old Norse exploration period. The Danish Viking Revival in Denmark was also largely initiated by poet and playwright Adam Oehlenschläger, whose 1802 poem "Guldhornene" (The Golden Horns) broke with earlier Classicist traditions by celebrating the nation's ancient, mythological past.

== Sweden ==
The term Viking was popularized with positive connotations by Erik Gustaf Geijer at the beginning of the 19th century. His poem The Viking (Vikingen) appeared in the first issue of the Swedish periodical, Iduna. The word Viking was taken to refer to romanticized, heroic, idealized Norse seafarers and warriors. This renewed interest of the Romanticism of a historic past had political implications. The Geatish Society, of which Geijer was a member, popularized this ideal to a great extent. Another author who had great influence on the perception of the Vikings was Esaias Tegnér, another member of the Geatish Society who wrote a modern version of Frithiof's Saga, which became widely popular in the Nordic countries, England, the United States, and Germany. One more man that contributed to Viking Revival was Per Henrik Ling (1776–1839). He was instrumental in the Swedish Revival, not only as a founding member of the Götiska förbundet but also through his unique emphasis on the physical and heroic ideal of the Viking.

== Germany ==
The German composer Richard Wagner is said to have strong influences of the Nordic mythology in his musical pieces. His Nordic influences further enhanced the Romanticism of the Viking era during that time. Wagner's Der Ring des Nibelungen, commonly referred to as the Ring cycle, is a set of four operas based loosely on figures and elements of Germanic mythology—particularly from the later Norse mythology—notably the Old Norse Poetic Edda and Volsunga Saga, and the epic poem Nibelungenlied. Jacob Grimm was a foundational philologist who dedicated to studying the Germanic Norse past. His academic work directly inspired the 19th-century Romantic interest in the North. His monumental work, Deutsche Mythologie (Teutonic Mythology), systematically collected and analyzed Norse and Germanic myths, giving the German intellectual world a unified, academic framework for their ancient pagan roots.

== Britain ==
English authors from the 16th century had been aware of the Viking impact on the countryside, though the numerous placenames of Danes Camp is better explained as a modification of dene, or hollow. Following the 17th-century first flowering of Anglo-Saxon studies, there was a similar wave of enthusiasm for Northern culture in Britain, identifying as Viking remains Iron Age hill forts and even Stonehenge and exemplified by the antiquarian interests of George Hickes, who published a Linguarum veterum septentrionalium thesaurus grammatico-criticus et archæologicus in 1703–05. In the 1780s, Denmark offered to cede Iceland to Britain in exchange for Crab Island (now Vieques, Puerto Rico), and in the 1860s Iceland was considered for compensation for the British support of Denmark in the Schleswig-Holstein conflicts. During this time, British interest and enthusiasm for Iceland and Nordic culture grew dramatically, expressed in original English poems extolling Viking virtues, such as Thomas Warton's "Runic Odes" of 1748:

Yes – 'tis decreed my Sword no more
Shall smoke and blush with hostile gore
To my great Father's Feasts I go,
Where luscious Wines for ever flow.
Which from the hollow Sculls we drain
Of Kings in furious Combat slain.

== United States ==
Rasmus B. Anderson, the founding head of the Department of Scandinavian Studies at the University of Wisconsin–Madison, also founded a publication company, The Norrœna Society, which focused on republishing translations of texts devoted to the history and romance of Northern Europe. Anderson was the author of a number of books with Scandinavian themes. He brought to the American popular attention the idea that Viking explorers discovered the New World and was the originator of Leif Erikson Day.

== See also ==
- Gothicism
- Scandinavism
- Vikings in popular culture
- Norse mythology in popular culture
- Neopaganism in Scandinavia
- Norse Mythology
- Neopaganism in German-speaking Europe
- Asatru
- Viking metal
- Viking rock
- Viking Society for Northern Research

== Sources ==
- Litzenberg, Karl (1947) The Victorians and the Vikings: A Bibliographical Essay on Anglo-Norse Literary Relations (University of Michigan Contributions in Modern Philology)
- Wawn, Andrew (2000) The Vikings and the Victorians: Inventing the Old North in Nineteenth-Century Britain (Cambridge: Brewer) ISBN 0-85991-644-8
- Ross, Margaret Clunies (1998) The Norse Muse in Britain 1750–1820 (Edizioni Parnaso) ISBN 978-88-86474-26-9
- Logan, F. Donald (1983)The Vikings in History (London: Hutchison & Co.) ISBN 0-415-08396-6
- Arnold, Martin (2008) Vikings: Culture and Conquest (Hambledon Continuum) ISBN 978-1-84725-190-9
- Foote, Peter Godfrey and D. M. Wilson (1990) The Viking Achievement: The Society and Culture of Early Medieval Scandinavia (Palgrave Macmillan) ISBN 978-0-312-03510-5
