= Edmir Mehmeti =

Swedish politician (born 2001)

Member of the Riksdag
- Incumbent
- Assumed office 21 October 2026
- Preceded by: Louise Meijer
- Constituency: Skåne County Southern

Personal details
- Born: 26 September 2001 (age 25)
- Party: Moderate Party

Edmir Mehmeti (born 26 September 2001) is a Swedish politician serving as a member of the Riksdag since 2026. From 2023 to 2026, he served as chairman of the Moderate Youth League in Skåne County.
