= Jonas Bylund =

Swedish musician

Jonas Bylund (born Sweden, 1963) is a classical trombonist. After an orchestral career in Scandinavia and Germany he is now a concerto soloist and eminent trombone teacher.

After studies at the State Academy of Music in Stockholm he played principal trombone with the Oslo Philharmonic Orchestra, and later with the Royal Stockholm Philharmonic Orchestra and Bamberger Symphoniker.

In 1988 Jonas Bylund won 1st prize at the "Concours International d'Execution Musicale" in Geneva, and the following year he also won the ARD International Music Competition in Munich. Since then he has performed with many of Europes leading orchestras including the Orchestre de la Suisse Romande, Bavarian Radio Symphony Orchestra, and Oslo Philharmonic Orchestra.

Jonas Bylund is a member of Stockholm Chamber Brass, a brass quintet that won 1st prize at the International Competition for brassquintets in Narbonne, France in 1988 and has recorded several acclaimed CDs of contemporary music for the Swedish BIS label.

Beside his concert career, Jonas Bylund has performed as an actor in opera and theatre. Since 1995 he has been Professor for Trombone at the Academy of Music in Hannover, Germany.
