= Cancerfonden =

Swedish cancer charity

Cancerfonden, the Swedish Cancer Society, is an independent non-profit organisation that works to defeat cancer through financing cancer research in Sweden. The organisation does its fundraising via a 90-account, which is monitored and controlled by the Swedish Fundraising Control. The Swedish Cancer Society has a number of international partnerships, for instance with UICC since 1967. The Swedish Cancer Society works on several different levels, apart from being one of Swedens biggest cancer research financers they also spread knowledge about cancer, support patients and next of kin and advocate within both prevention, health care, and research.

== Cancer Researcher of the year ==
The prize "Cancer Researcher of the Year" has been awarded since 2016 and is given to a cancer researcher who has excelled within his or her area. The main purpose of the award is to highlight the continuous research endeavours to beat cancer. In 2022, Henrik Grönberg was awarded the prize.

=== Recipients of the award ===
- 2016 - Thomas Helleday
- 2017 - Lena Claesson-Welsh
- 2018 - Fredrik Mertens
- 2019 - Ruth Palmer
- 2020 - Sophia Zackrisson
- 2021 - Anna Martling
- 2022 - Henrik Grönberg
- 2023 - Göran Jönsson
- 2024 - Maréne Landström
- 2025 - Kristian Pietras

== The pink ribbon ==
The pink ribbon is a campaign that The Swedish Cancer Society has carried out annually in October since 2003. The goal is to fight breast cancer by funding cancer research, spreading knowledge about the disease and driving public opinion. Famous designers craft a new ribbon each year and the Crown Princess of Sweden is patron of the campaign.

=== Social media controversy ===
In 2016, Cancerfonden made the rounds in international media when an ad for Cancerfonden's breast cancer awareness campaign, showing cartoon representations of breasts as two circles, were banned by Facebook. The social media company later apologized.

== The Swedish Cancer Society´s report ==
The Swedish Cancer Society annually publishes a report that covers the state of cancer care, cancer prevention and cancer research in Sweden. In 2019, the report noted the increased waiting times in cancer care and described the situation 'a post code lottery’. The waiting times did not meet the new standardized care process – from suspicion to treatment, called Vårdförloppet.
