= Ultima Thule (Swedish band) =

Swedish rock band

- Origin: Nyköping, Sweden
- Genres: Rock, viking rock
- Years active: 1984–1987, 1990–present
- Members: Bruno Hansen – guitar, vocals Niklas Adolfsson – guitar Thomas Krohn – bass Ulf Hansen – drums
- Past members: Jan Thörnblom – guitar, vocals

Ultima Thule (Latin for "Farthest North") is a Swedish rock band. Their style is based on what they call Vikingarock ("Viking rock"), which combines occasional folk melodies with rock, mixed with Oi!, street punk and Teddy Boy. Some of their lyrics are versions of poems and traditional songs by Evert Taube, such as "Änglamark". They have also released several versions of Sweden's national anthem, "Du gamla, Du fria'". They have been described as a white power band, though ethnomusicologist Benjamin R. Teitelbaum argues that this classification is much too simplistic. The band also rejects the description, saying they oppose fascism and racism.

För Fäderneslandet is Ultima Thule's most popular album, selling more than 100,000 copies. Vikingabalk, their second best selling album, went gold with more than 80,000 copies sold.

== History ==
Ultima Thule was founded in early 1984 in Nyköping, Sweden. Band members have cited the Sex Pistols and late seventies punk rock as their main inspiration. Their songs were a mixture of Nordic folk music, rock and punk. The group has described this particular style of music as Vikingarock. The singer Bruno Hansen was an active member of The Nordic Realm Party.

After a few years as an underground band, the band entered the mainstream in the early 1990s when they signed a record deal with Mariann Grammofon. Following media controversies, Mariann Grammofon quickly cancelled their record deal with Ultima Thule. After that, the band created their own record label, named Ultima Thule Records.

Ultima Thule has sold one certified platinum and three gold albums in Sweden, and managed to have three singles on the 20th-best hits list at the same time. Their lyrics are mostly in Swedish, with only a few songs in English, including covers of bands such as Sham 69 and Ronettes.

=== Criticism ===
The band's first EP was sponsored by Bevara Sverige Svenskt ("Keep Sweden Swedish") and was used as a campaign theme by Sverigepartiet. Some of their songs were included on compilation albums with bands like Skrewdriver and Brutal Attack.

Their first vocalist, from 1984 to 1986, Bruno Hansen, was the leader of the Nyköping "action group" of the Nordic Realm Party.

Ultima Thule successfully entered the mainstream when they were signed up by Bert Karlsson, a record manager and founder of the New Democracy party. The band seems to have had a mail-order distribution deal with the record company Ragnarock at some stage.

Between 1984 and 1987, the band played at about 30 skinhead concerts. On 6 June 1987, they played together with Agent Bulldogg, Vit Aggression and Dirlewanger at a white power concert in Södertälje. On 30 November 1991, the band played at a white power concert with Vit Aggression and Division S.

In 1994, Ultima Thule opened a record store, CD-butiken, where they sold records by Heroes in the Snow, Svastika and Vit Aggression. The band also started a fan club that at one point had 900 members. Through the club they sold records, posters and T-shirts, not only for their own band but also for the record companies Last Resort Records and Ragnarock Records. Ultima Thule's recording studio in Nyköping was burnt to the ground by arsonists on 10 February 2000.

==== Band's reaction ====
To respond to the allegations of racism, the band issued a statement on their website making clear they do not consider themselves racist, nor are they neo-nazis. In their own words,

"This country must ask itself about its mental health, when patriotic songs about Sweden, when texts from our history books, are deemed equivalent to racism. [...] We live in an increasingly shrinking and globalised world and in one way, it is important for people to know their own roots and for people to feel their national pride. If we Swedes are not allowed to show esteem and pride about our own country without being called racists, this makes [it] much more difficult to show others respect for their own particular identity and singular characteristics. [...] We have taken note of our right to be proud of our own country and we do not tolerate some obscure publication linking our music with racism and Nazism."

During a concert in 2001, some members of the audience made Hitler salutes. The band stopped playing to make clear that they did not want to be seen playing for Nazis. About a year after that, they were interviewed in the National Democrats' magazine Nationell Idag where the band members declared they wanted a strong leader such as Jörg Haider and Jean-Marie Le Pen.

== Discography ==
- 1985: Sverige, Sverige fosterland – EP
- 1990: Hurra för Nordens länder – EP
- 1991: Svea hjältar – EP
- 1991: Havets vargar – EP
- 1992: Sverige, Sverige fosterland – EP
- 1992: Schottis på Valhall – EP
- 1992: Mitt land – EP
- 1992: Svea hjältar – CD
- 1992: För fäderneslandet – CD
- 1992: The early years 1984–1987 – CD
- 1993: Vikingablod – CD
- 1993: Vikingabalk – CD
- 1994: Öppna landskap – CD
- 1994: Nu grönskar det – CD
- 1994: För fäderneslandet – EP
- 1994: The early years 1984–1987 – MC
- 1994: Vikingabalk – MC
- 1994: Tack för hjälpen! – CD
- 1995: Once upon a time… – CD
- 1995: Blonda, svenska vikingar – CD
- 1995: Lejonet från Norden – CD
- 1996: Skinhead – CD
- 1996: Karoliner – CD
- 1997: Nu grönskar det igen… – CD
- 1997: Live in Dresden – CD
- 1997: The early years 1984–1987 – EP
- 1997: Nu grönskar det – EP
- 1997: Lejonet från Norden – EP
- 1997: Karoliner – EP
- 1999: Sörjd och saknad – CD
- 1999: Sverige – CD
- 2000: Once upon a time… – CD
- 2000: Folkets röst – CD
- 2000: Herrlich Hermannsland – CD
- 2001: Sverige – EP
- 2001: Resa utan slut – CD
- 2001: Ragnarök – CD
- 2001: Once upon a time… – EP
- 2001: The early years – EP
- 2002: Live in Dresden – CD
- 2002: Blonda, svenska vikingar – EP
- 2002: Carlie – EP
- 2002: Öppna landskap – EP
- 2002: Resa utan slut – EP
- 2003: Sverige – Picture-EP
- 2003: Lejonet från Norden – Picture-EP
- 2003: För fäderneslandet – Picture-EP
- 2004: Lokes träta – EP
- 2004: Vikingablod – EP
- 2004: Rötter – CD
- 2005: Skaldermjöde – EP
- 2005: Yggdrasil – CD
- 2007: Folkets röst vol. 2 – CD
- 2007: 25 year anniversary – CD
- 2009: Korpkvädet – CD
- 2012: Live at Kuggnäs 2012 – CD
- 2015: Trägen vinner – CD/LP
