= Karin Karlsbro =

Swedish politician (born 1970)

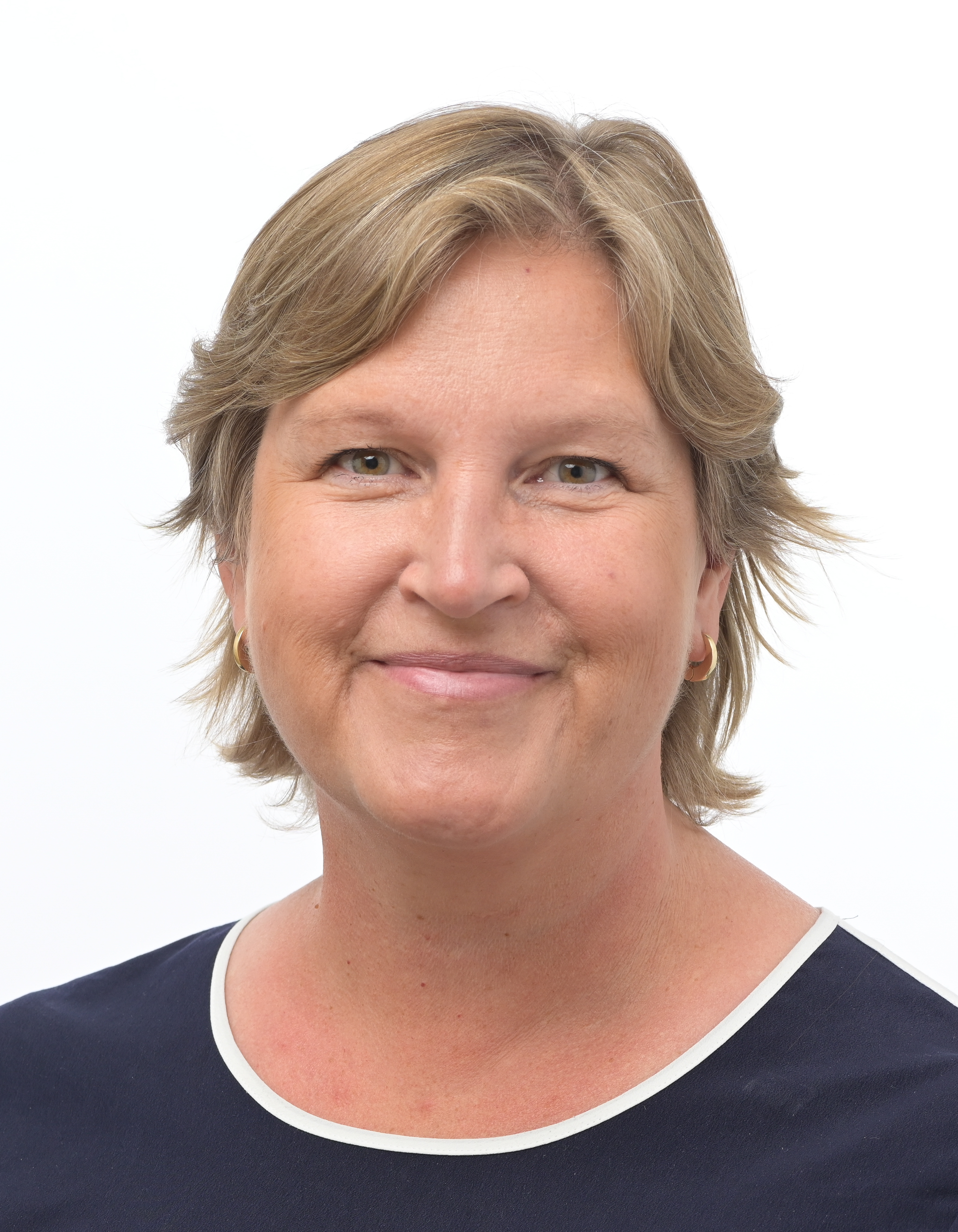
- Karin Karlsbro in 2024

Member of the European Parliament
- Incumbent
- Assumed office 2 July 2019
- Constituency: Sweden

Chairman of the Liberal Youth of Sweden
- In office 1995–1997
- Preceded by: Fredrik Malmberg
- Succeeded by: Erik Ullenhag

Personal details
- Born: Karin Sonja Charlotta Karlsbro; 23 September 1970 (age 56) Norrtälje, Sweden

Karin Sonja Charlotta Karlsbro (born 23 September 1970) is a Swedish politician of the Liberals. Since 2019, Karlsbro has served as a Member of the European Parliament.

In the European Parliament, Karlsbro belongs to the centrist-liberal political group Renew Europe. She is Vice-Chair of the Committee on International Trade (INTA) and a substitute member of both the Committee on the Environment (ENVI) and the Committee on Fisheries (PECH). During the 2024–2029 term, Karlsbro serves as the European Parliament’s rapporteur (lead negotiator) on all matters related to financial support for Ukraine and EU–Ukraine trade relations. She led the negotiations on transferring the windfall profits from the frozen Russian assets to Ukraine. According to a summary by Europaportalen, during her first term (2019–2024), Karlsbro was ranked as the most active Swedish Member of the European Parliament.

== Education ==
Karlsbro holds a law degree from Stockholm University and has studied at the London School of Economics and Political Science (LSE).

== Career ==
Karlsbro served as the chairman of the Liberal Youth of Sweden between 1995 and 1997. Between 2000 and 2006, she was the administrative director at the Parliament Office of the Liberal People's Party (now the Liberals). From 2006 to 2010, she worked as the chief of staff for Nyamko Sabuni, then Sweden's Minister for Integration and Gender Equality.

Karlsbro has held a number of political offices in Stockholm and most recently she has served as the group leader in Norrtälje between 2014 and 2018.

She served a Deputy Cabinet Member of the Riksdag between 29 September 2014 until 3 October 2014.

In her professional life, Karlsbro has worked as a consultant in her own company and as a sustainability expert at the PR firm Grayling and between 2015-2019 as Chief Sustainability Officer at Fastighetsägarna Stockholm.

=== Member of the European Parliament, 2019–present ===
On 29 Mars 2019, Karlsbro was named the Liberal's top candidate for the 2019 European Parliament election. In the 2024 European Parliament election, Karlsbro yet again held the position as the top candidate for the Liberals.

Since becoming a Member of the European Parliament, Karlsbro has been serving on the Committee on International Trade. After the 2024 election, she was appointed as the Vice Chair of Committee on International Trade. As rapporteur, she led the negotiations to get the European Parliament to approve the European Commission’s proposal to send the proceeds from frozen Russian assets to Ukraine.

She has also served as shadow rapporteur for the trade agreements with Vietnam and Australia–New Zealand. In this role, she was the lead negotiator for her political group on the EU-Vietnam free trade agreement, which was passed by the European Parliament in early 2020. The agreement was the first of its kind between the EU and Vietnam and eliminated 99% of tariffs on both sides. The final agreement also included commitments to strengthen workers’ rights and environmental protections, including Vietnam’s obligation to comply with the Paris Agreement.

Starting in March 2020, Karlsbro was also responsible for coordinating the committee’s work on CBAM: the Carbon Border Adjustment Mechanism. The mechanism is a proposal by the European Commission requiring that goods imported into the EU be taxed for carbon emissions in the same way as goods produced within the EU.

Since 2019, Karlsbro has alternated between serving as a substitute and full member of the Committee on the Environment, Public Health and Food Safety (ENVI). During the 2024–2029 term, she is a substitute member of the Committee on Fisheries (PECH), where she actively works to save the herring in the Baltic Sea. Previously she has been a member of the European Parliament’s Subcommittee on Human Rights (DROI) where she advocated for LGBTQ+ rights.

== Personal life ==
Karlsbro was born in Roslags-Bro. She currently lives in Stockholm and has three daughters.
