= Liberal Youth of Sweden =

Youth wing of the Swedish Liberals

Liberal Youth of Sweden Liberala ungdomsförbundet
- Chairperson: Anton Holmlund
- Secretary General: Martin Norrby
- Founded: 1934; 92 years ago
- Headquarters: Hantverkargatan 25, Stockholm
- Membership: 2 550 (2020)
- Ideology: Liberalism; Liberal feminism European federalism
- Mother party: The Liberals
- International affiliation: International Federation of Liberal Youth (IFLRY)
- European affiliation: European Liberal Youth (LYMEC)
- Nordic affiliation: Association of Young Nordic Social Liberals (SNUS)
- Website: www.luf.se

The Liberal Youth of Sweden (Swedish: Liberala ungdomsförbundet, LUF) is the youth wing of the Swedish Liberals. The Liberal Youth of Sweden has a long tradition of international cooperation and is a full member of the International Federation of Liberal Youth (IFLRY) and the European Liberal Youth (LYMEC). They have published the magazine Liebling - Liberal Youth since 1961.

== History ==
The Liberal Youth of Sweden traces its roots back to Verdandi, a radical student organisation founded in 1882 by Karl Staaff, the future prime minister and leader of the Liberal Coalition Party. In 1910 the Swedish Freeminded Youth League (Swedish: Sveriges frisinnade ungdomsförbund) was formed as the youth wing of the Freeminded National Association, Sweden's first grassroots liberal organisation, with Eric Festin as its first chairperson. The youth league was active during the First World War, but lost members afterwards. In 1923 the Freeminded National Association split over the prohibition of alcohol, and though the youth league tried to stay together it too split in 1927.

The two liberal parties reunited in August 1934 as the People's Party. The youth league was reunited in the same year as the People's Party Youth League (Swedish: Folkpartiets ungdomsförbund, FPU) with Bertil Ohlin as its first chairperson. When it was founded it had 1000 members in about 100 local associations, but many new members soon joined. In the 1930s FPU campaigned on issues such as the abolition of school fees, and in the 1950s began to demand that a proportion of GDP should go to aid. FPU also campaigned for Sweden to join NATO and for the TV and radio monopolies to be abolished. In the 1960s FPU became prominent under the leadership of among others Per Ahlmark and Ola Ullsten and influenced its mother party in a radical direction. However, a time of internal battles followed in the early 1970s, culminating in the chairmanship election of 1971 where the incumbent Per Gahrton was defeated by Lars Leijonborg by one vote's margin.

At the congress in 1991 the youth league changed its name to the Liberal Youth of Sweden after the People's Party had renamed itself the Liberal People's Party the previous year. LUF was (and is) noted for its support of Swedish membership of the European Union, which Sweden joined in 1995. After the mother party's success in the general election of 2002 the membership of LUF increased significantly.

On 28 February 2016 the Stockholm branch of the party passed a motion calling for the legalization of incest and necrophilia.

From 2022 to 2024, Eric Berg served as chairperson of the youth wing.

Anton Holmlund was elected chairperson in 2024.

== Organisation ==
LUF has 21 districts, the three largest being Stockholm, Väst and Skåne. The highest decisionmaking authority is the congress, which is held every year. 99 congress delegates are elected by the districts, with one seat for each district and the remainder allocated in proportion to their number of members. Once every two years the congress discusses and amends the Liberal Youth's policy programme. The most recent such congress was held in 2019 in Västerås.

=== Districts ===
- Blekinge
- Dalarna
- Gotland
- Gävleborg
- Halland
- Jämtland/Härjedalen
- Jönköping
- Kalmar
- Kronoberg
- Norrbotten
- Skåne
- Stockholm (covers Greater Stockholm area)
- Södermanland
- Uppsala
- Värmland
- Väst (covers Västra Götaland and Kungsbacka municipality)
- Västerbotten
- Västernorrland
- Västmanland
- Örebro
- Östergötland

== List of chairpersons ==
- Bertil Ohlin, 1934–1939
- Lennart Hartman, 1939–1945
- Gunhild Palmqvist, 1945–1948
- Nils Schön, 1948–1950
- Sven Wedén, 1950–1952
- Gunnar Helén, 1952–1954
- Bengt Johnson, 1954–1957
- Sven H. Åsbrink, 1957–1959
- Göran C.-O. Claesson, 1959–1960
- Per Ahlmark, 1960–1962
- Ola Ullsten, 1962–1964
- Gustaf Lindencrona, 1964–1966
- Thomas Hammarberg, 1966–1969
- Per Gahrton, 1969–1971
- Lars Leijonborg, 1971–1973
- Johan Schück, 1973–1974
- Billy Olsson, 1974–1975
- Bonnie Bernström, 1975–1977
- Christer Nilsson, 1977–1979
- Peter Örn, 1979–1983
- Maria Leissner, 1983–1985
- Torbjörn Pettersson, 1985–1987
- Lars Granath, 1987–1989
- Lotta Edholm, 1989–1991
- Fredrik Malmberg, 1991–1995
- Karin Karlsbro, 1995–1997
- Erik Ullenhag, 1997–1999
- Birgitta Ohlsson, 1999–2002
- Fredrik Malm, 2002–2006
- Frida Johansson Metso, 2006–2009
- Adam Cwejman, 2009–2012
- Linda Nordlund, 2012–2015
- Henrik Edin, 2015–2016
- Joar Forssell, 2016–2019
- Romina Pourmokhtari, 2019–2022
- Erik Berg, 2022–2024
- Anton Holmlund, 2024–
