= Johan Britz =

Swedish politician (born 1975)

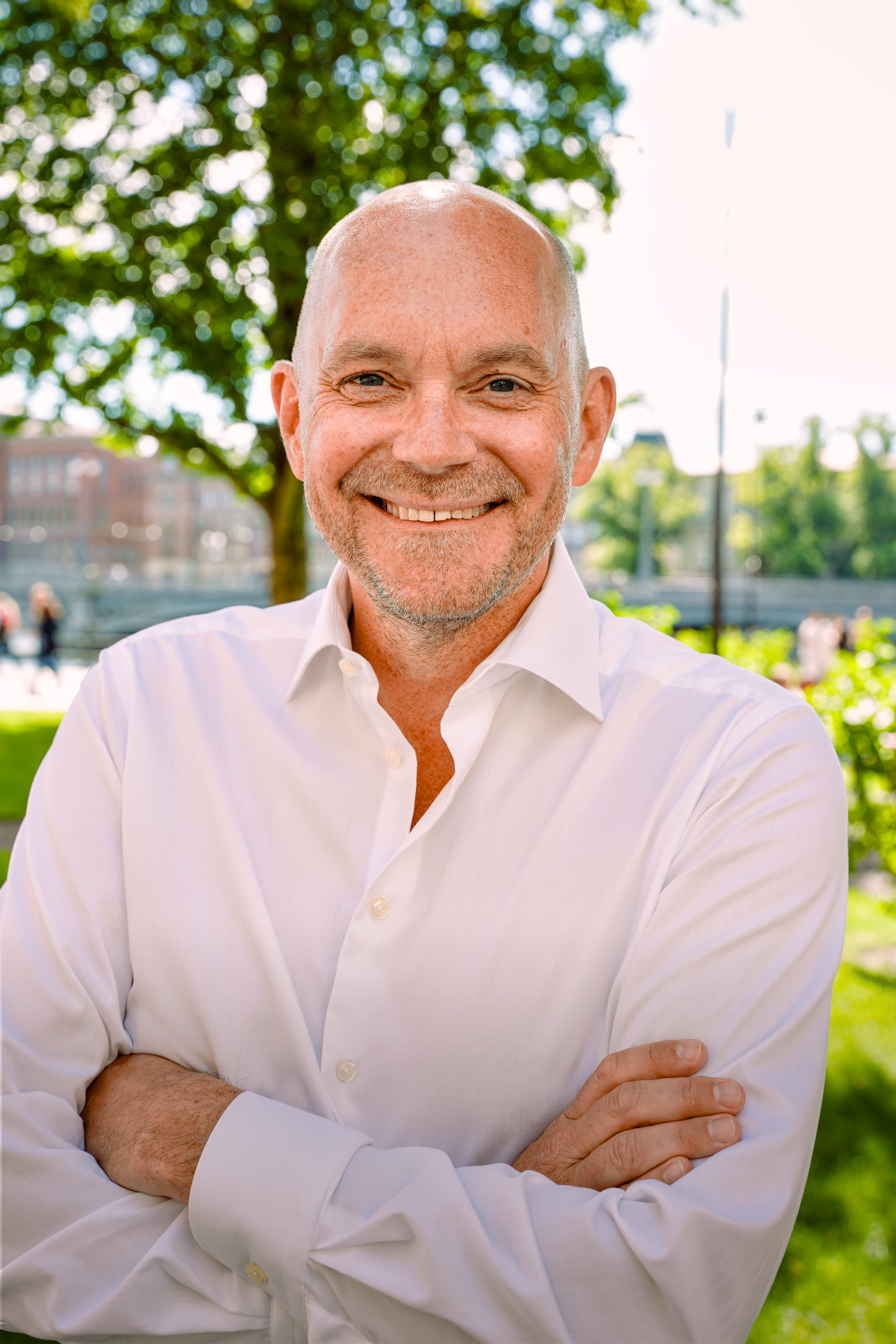

Minister for Employment
- Incumbent
- Assumed office 28 June 2025
- Prime Minister: Ulf Kristersson
- Preceded by: Mats Persson

Personal details
- Born: 19 July 1975 (age 51)
- Party: Liberals

Johan Emil Britz (born 19 July 1975) is a Swedish politician serving as minister for employment since 2025. From 2002 to 2004, he served as chairman of Liberala Studenter.
