= Viking rock =

Subgenre of rock music

- Other names: Vikingarock
- Stylistic origins: Nordic folk music; rockabilly; Oi!; street punk; melodic hardcore; hard rock; progressive rock
- Cultural origins: Sweden

Other topics
- Viking metal, Viking revival, white supremacy

Viking rock (Vikingarock) is a rock music genre that takes much of its themes from 19th-century Viking romanticism, mixing it with elements of rockabilly, Oi! or street punk, and folk music. Frequent themes occurring in Viking rock include vikings and Norse mythology, as well as Sweden's King Karl XII and the Caroleans.

Viking rock is often linked to white supremacy. Many make no distinction between Viking rock and white power music, and there is debate whether Viking rock is essentially racist. Some viking rock bands, however, disapprove of racism such as the Swedish band Hel.

Kuggnäsfestivalen is a music festival that caters to viking rock.

== List of notable Viking rock bands ==
- Glittertind
- Hel
- Ultima Thule
