= Joar Forssell =

Swedish politician (born 1993)

Joar Forssell L
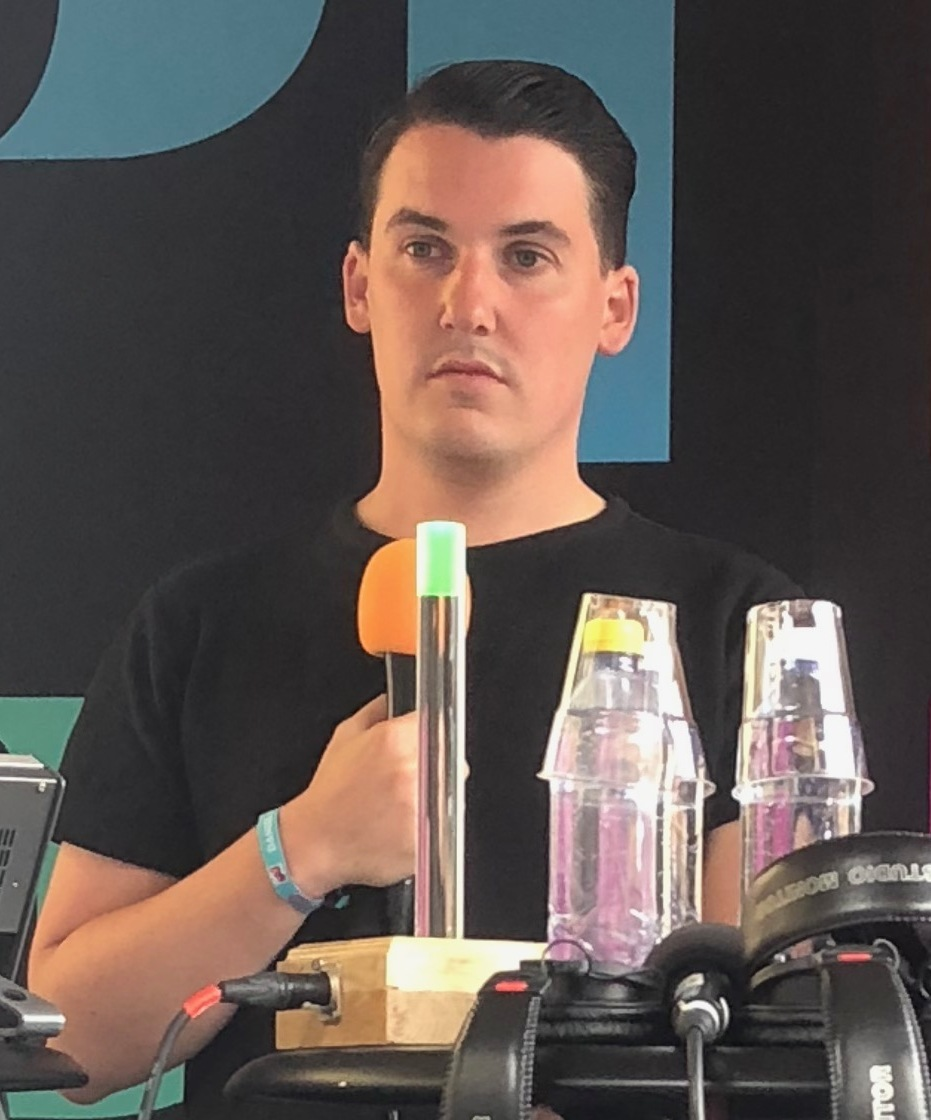
- Joar Forssell in 2018.

Member of the Swedish Parliament for Stockholm Municipality
- Incumbent
- Assumed office 24 September 2018

Personal details
- Born: 17 February 1993 (age 33)
- Party: Liberals
- Parents: Lennart Carlsson; Emilia Forssell
- Occupation: Politician

Joar Nils Arvid Karlsson Forssell (born 17 February 1993) is a Swedish politician and a member of the Swedish parliament. Between 6 August 2016 and 18 August 2019 he was chairperson of Liberal Youth of Sweden (LUF). In the 2018 parliamentary elections he got a place in the parliament for the Liberals. He is one of the 20 members of parliament that belong to the Liberals. He is a member of the Taxation Committee since 2018.

== Drug liberalization ==
Joar is a Swedish cannabis rights activist, and has expressed his opinion against the zero tolerance drug policy of Sweden. He is also a supporter of abolishing the monarchy and was the recipient of an award from the Swedish Republican Association.
