= 2022 Stockholm municipal election =

Election in Stockholm

- 11 September 2022

101 seats 51 seats needed for a majority
- Turnout: 81.6%
| | First party | Second party | Third party |
|---|---|---|---|
| Party | Social Democrats | Moderate | Left |
| Last election | 23 seats, 22.30% | 22 seats, 20.98% | 13 seats, 13.03% |
| Seats won | 31 | 20 | 16 |
| Seat change | ▲8 | ▼2 | ▲3 |
| Popular vote | 180,173 | 112,120 | 94,115 |
| Percentage | 29.43% | 18.33% | 15.37% |
| Swing | ▲7.13% | ▼2,65% | ▲2.34% |
| | Fourth party | Fifth party | Sixth party |
| Party | Sweden Democrats | Liberals | Centre |
| Last election | 8 seats, 7.96% | 10 seats, 10.07% | 8 seats, 7.89% |
| Seats won | 9 | 8 | 7 |
| Seat change | ▲1 | ▼2 | ▼1 |
| Popular vote | 49,182 | 48,865 | 40,992 |
| Percentage | 8.03% | 7.98% | 6.69% |
| Swing | ▲0.07% | ▼2.09% | ▼1.20% |
| | Seventh party | Eighth party |
| Party | Green | Christian Democrats |
| Last election | 9 seats, 8.33% | 5 seats, 5.05% |
| Seats won | 6 | 4 |
| Seat change | ▼3 | ▼1 |
| Popular vote | 36,907 | 23,457 |
| Percentage | 6.03% | 3.83% |
| Swing | ▼2.30% | ▼1.22% |
- Distribution of seats and largest party within each municipal constituency
Mayor before election
Anna König Jerlmyr
Moderate
Elected Mayor
Karin Wanngård
Social Democrats

The 2022 Stockholm municipal election was held on 11 September 2022, concurrently with the 2022 Swedish general election. The election determined how many seats each party would be allocated on the 101-member Stockholm city council (Swedish: Stockholms kommunfullmäktige) through a system of proportional representation.

Karin Wanngård of the Social Democrats was elected Mayor of Stockholm after her party formed a coalition with the Left Party and the Green Party. They ousted Anna König Jerlmyr of the Moderate Party, who previously had led a coalition of her own party, the Liberal Party, the Centre Party, the Christian Democrats and the Green Party from 2018 to 2022.

SD's election night vigil in Stockholm attracted controversy after an SD candidate for the Stockholm municipal election proclaimed "Helg Seger" while raising her arm in an interview with far-right blog Samnytt, which is phonetically similar to "Hell Seger", the Swedish translation of the Nazi "Sieg Heil" chant. The candidate subsequently told Expressen that she had aimed to provoke the media into overinterpretations before later telling Dagens Nyheter that she had misspoke and meant to say "segerhelg" ("weekend victory").

== Results ==
| Party | | Votes | | | Seats | |
| Party | | % | ± | # | # | ± |
|---|---|---|---|---|---|---|
| s | Social Democrats; Socialdemokraterna | 29.43% | ▲7.13% | 180.173 | 31 | ▲8 |
| m | Moderate Party; Moderaterna | 18.33% | ▼2.65% | 112.220 | 20 | ▼2 |
| v | Left Party; Vänsterpartiet | 15.37% | ▲2.34% | 94.115 | 16 | ▲3 |
| sd | Swedish Democrats; Sverigedemokraterna | 8.03% | ▲0.07% | 49.182 | 9 | ▲1 |
| fp | People's Party; Folkpartiet | 7.98% | ▼2.09% | 48.865 | 8 | ▼2 |
| c | Centre Party; Centerpartiet | 6.69% | ▼1.20% | 40.992 | 7 | ▼1 |
| mp | Green Party; Miljöpartiet | 6.03% | ▼2.30% | 36.907 | 6 | ▼3 |
| kd | Christian Democrats; Kristdemokraterna | 3.83% | ▼1.22% | 23.457 | 4 | ▼1 |
Parties that failed to win seats:
| fi | Feminist Initiative; Feministiskt initiativ | 1.18% | ▼2.12% | 7.226 | 0 | ▼3 |
Source: The Stockholm County administrative board

== See also ==
- Elections in Sweden
- List of political parties in Sweden
- City of Stockholm
