= Billström =

Billström is a surname. Notable people with the surname include:

- Annika Billström (born 1956), Swedish politician
- Tobias Billström (born 1973), Swedish politician
