= Ulf Adelsohn =

Swedish politician (born 1941)

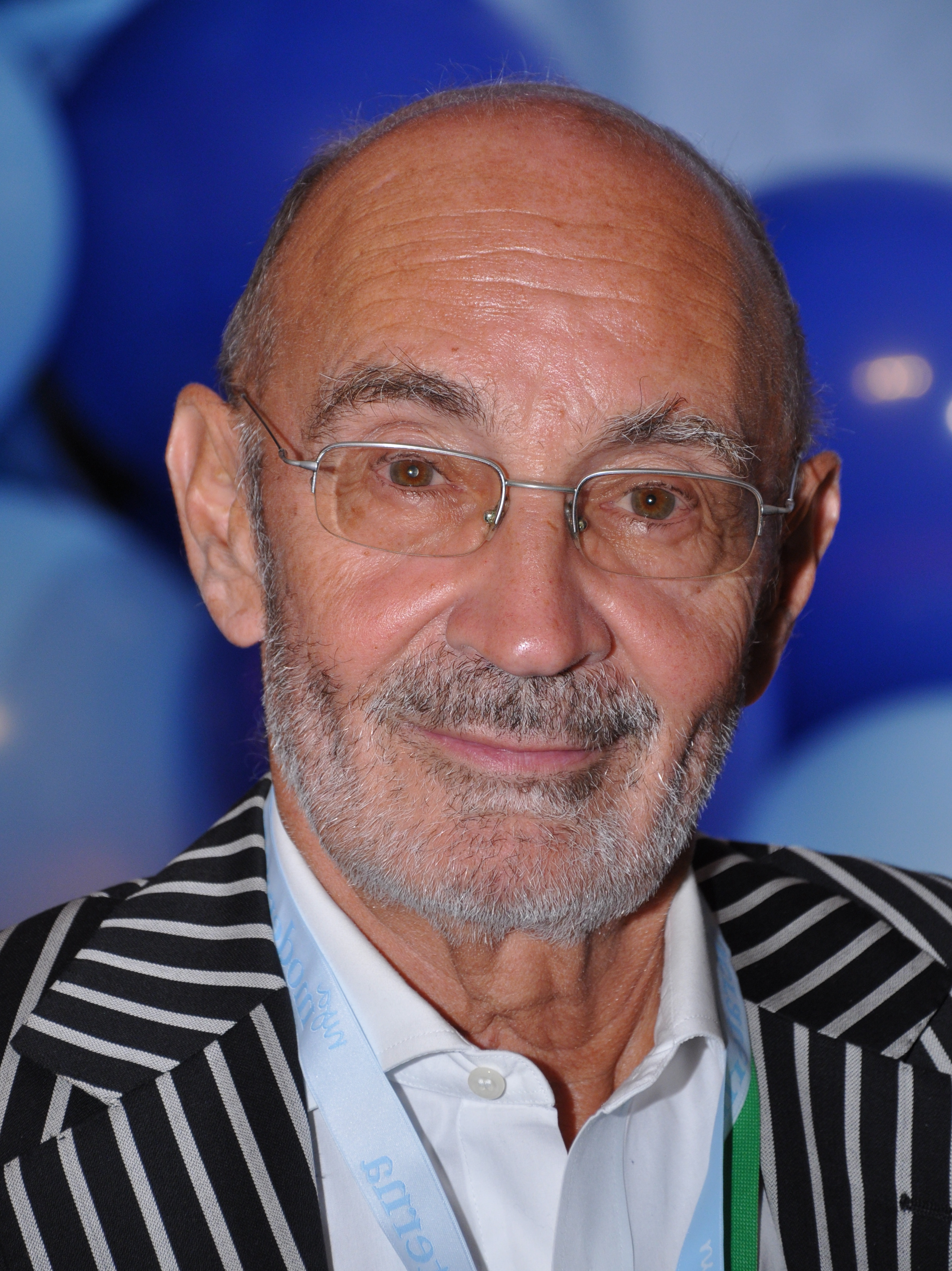
- Adelsohn in 2010

Governor of Stockholm County
- In office 1992–2001
- Preceded by: Lennart Sandgren
- Succeeded by: Mats Hellström

Leader of the Moderate Party
- In office 25 October 1981 – 23 August 1986
- Preceded by: Gösta Bohman
- Succeeded by: Carl Bildt

Leader of the Opposition
- In office 8 October 1982 – 23 August 1986
- Monarch: Carl XVI Gustaf
- Prime Minister: Olof Palme; Ingvar Carlsson
- Preceded by: Olof Palme
- Succeeded by: Carl Bildt

Minister of Communications
- In office 12 October 1979 – 5 May 1981
- Prime Minister: Thorbjörn Fälldin
- Preceded by: Anitha Bondestam
- Succeeded by: Claes Elmstedt

Stockholm Municipal Commissioner for Finance
- In office 1976–1979
- Preceded by: John-Olof Persson
- Succeeded by: John-Olof Persson

Personal details
- Born: 4 October 1941 (age 84) Stockholm, Sweden
- Party: Moderate Party
- Spouse: Lena Adelsohn Liljeroth (m. 1981)
- Children: 2
- Education: Stockholm University

Ulf Adelsohn (born 4 October 1941) is a Swedish politician, leader of the Moderate Party from 1981 to 1986 and Governor of Stockholm County from 1992 to 2001. He was a member of the Riksdag from 1982 to 1988 and served as Chairman of the Board of SJ AB 2001–2011, from where he resigned due to quarrels with the Reinfeldt cabinet on its railway deregulation policies.

== Early life ==
Adelsohn was born on 4 October 1941 in Stockholm, Sweden, the son of the deputy director (kansliråd) in the Ministry of Justice Oskar Adelsohn and his wife Margareta (née Halling). His paternal grandparents were Polish Jews and his mother was of Swedish descent. On the side of his mother, he is a descendant (great-great-great-great-grandson) of Jacob Johan Anckarström; the assassin of Gustav III who was convicted for regicide and executed.

Adelsohn studied law at Stockholm University, earning a Candidate of Law degree in 1968. Adelsohn was chairman of the Swedish Union of Conservative Students from 1966 to 1968, opposed the occupation of the Student Union Building in Stockholm in 1968 and was a co-founder of Borgerliga Studenter – Opposition '68 later in the same year.

== Career ==
Adelsohn worked as ombudsman for Fastighets AB Stockholm City from 1968 to 1970, and was deputy chairman of the Moderate Party in Stockholm from 1968 to 1973. He was assistant director at Swedish Confederation of Professional Associations from 1970 to 1973, gatuborgarråd from 1973 to 1976, and Commissioner of the Finance in the Department of the Stockholm City Administration from 1976 to 1979. He served as minister of communications (transport) in the Fälldin II cabinet centre-right government from 1979 to 1981. He was leader of the Swedish Moderate Party from 1981 to 1986, the second largest party (after the dominant Social Democrats) and was thus the leader of the main opposition party in the 1985 election.

Adelsohn was a member of parliament from 1982 to 1988, and served as Governor of Stockholm County from 1992 to 2001.

Adelsohn was a member of the municipal council from 1966 to 1979, chairman of the ice hockey section of Djurgårdens IF from 1974 to 1977, a member of the Council of the Swedish Sports Federation (Riksidrottsstyrelsen) from 1977 to 1979, board member of Wasa Insurance Company from 1990 to 1992, the Swedish Tourist Council (Sveriges turistråd) from 1995 to 2000, and the Riksdag Remunerations Board (Riksdagens arvodesnämnd) from 1999. Furthermore, he was chairman of Gröna Lund from 1987 to 1991, Bohusbanken from 1990 to 1992, Styrelsen för Sverigebilden from 1992 to 1995, Stockholm County Development Fund (Utvecklingsfonden Stockholms län) from 1992 to 1995, Stockholm Water Festival AB from 1992 to 1996, the Archipelago Foundation (Skärgårdsstiftelsen) from 1992 to 1998, the Civil Aviation Administration from 1992, the County (Regional) Employment Board in Stockholm County (Länsarbetsnämnden i Stockholms län) from 1992, Almi Stockholm from 1995, and Skansen from 1997. From 2001 to 2011 was he chairman of the board for SJ. In 2005 he decided to stand for election for Stockholm City Council again, declaring himself to be a candidate for Speaker of the Council. His candidacy was however withdrawn before the elections in 2006.

== Personal life ==
In 1981, Adelsohn married the then journalist Lena Liljeroth, the daughter of Hans Liljeroth and Inger (née Arlon). Lena Adelsohn Liljeroth later served as minister for culture in the Reinfeldt cabinet. They have two children, Erik and Ebba.

An avid supporter of Djurgårdens IF, Adelsohn was at one point chairman of the club's ice hockey department.

== Awards and decorations ==
- Grand Decoration of Honour in Silver with Sash for Services to the Republic of Austria (1997)
- (Estonia) 1st Class of the Order of the White Star (8 September 1995)

== Bibliography ==
- Adelsohn, Ulf (2014). Med liv och lust [With life and desire] (in Swedish). Stockholm: Norstedt. ISBN 9789113055152. SELIBR 14978077.
- Adelsohn, Ulf; Svedelid, Olov (1991). Priset för ett liv [The price of a life] (in Swedish). Stockholm: Gedin. ISBN 917964094X. SELIBR 7677245.
- Adelsohn Liljeroth, Lena; Löfgren, Ulf; Adelsohn, Ulf (1990). En låda berättar [A box tells] (in Swedish). Stockholm: B. Wahlström. ISBN 9132131321. SELIBR 7240871.
- Adelsohn, Ulf (1988). Partiledare: dagbok 1981-1986 [Party leader: diary 1981-1986]. W & W pocket, 99-0564337-0 (in Swedish) (New ed.). Stockholm: Wahlström & Widstrand. ISBN 9146156313. SELIBR 7281397.
- Adelsohn, Ulf (1987). Partiledare: dagbok 1981-1986 [Party leader: diary 1981-1986] (in Swedish). Stockholm: Gedin. ISBN 9179640222. SELIBR 7677175.
- Adelsohn, Ulf; Gustafson, Bengt (1982). Ulf Adelsohn: partiledare [Ulf Adelsohn: party leader] (in Swedish). Stockholm: Moderata samlingspartiet. SELIBR 9348201.
- Adelsohn, Ulf; Lindén, Staffan (1978). Kommunalmän!: hur skulle Ni göra om det var Era egna pengar? [Municipal people!: what would you do if it was your own money?] (in Swedish). Stockholm: Wahlström & Widstrand. ISBN 9146131612. SELIBR 7280275.
- Adelsohn, Ulf (1972). Torsten Kreuger - sanningen på väg [Torsten Kreuger - the truth on the way] (in Swedish). Stockholm: Samtid o. framtid. ISBN 918513600X. SELIBR 7745873.
- Adelsohn, Ulf; Diesen, Ingrid; Olin, Peder (1969). Moderat kulturpolitik [Moderate cultural policy] (in Swedish). Uppsala: Medborgarskolan. SELIBR 745623.

Party political offices
Preceded by Gösta Bohman	Leader of the Swedish Moderate Party; 1981–1986	Succeeded by Carl Bildt
Political offices
Preceded by Lennart Sandgren	Governor of Stockholm County; 1992–2001	Succeeded by Mats Hellström
Preceded by John-Olof Persson	Mayor of Stockholm; 1976–1979	Succeeded by John-Olof Persson
