= Local Government Act 2019 =

Legislation on local government in Ireland

Oireachtas
- Long title: An Act to provide for the transfer of part of the administrative area of the council of the county of Cork to the administrative area of the council of the city of Cork; to provide for the holding of plebiscites by certain local authorities on the question as to whether or not the cathaoirligh of those local authorities should be elected to such positions by the electors of the administrative areas of those local authorities and the question as to whether or not certain functions of the chief executives of those local authorities should be transferred to those cathaoirligh; for those and other purposes to amend the Local Government Act 1991, the Local Government Act 2001, the Valuation Act 2001, the Official Languages Act 2003 and certain other enactments; and to provide for matters connected therewith.
- Citation: No. 1 of 2019
- Signed: 25 January 2019
- Commenced: 31 January 2019 and 8 February 2019

Legislative history
- Bill citation: No. 91 of 2018
- Introduced by: Minister for Housing, Planning and Local Government (Eoghan Murphy)
- Introduced: 25 July 2018

Amends
- Local Government Act 2001

Keywords
- Local authority boundary change; directly-elected mayor

The Local Government Act 2019 (Act No.1 of 2019; previously the Local Government Bill 2018, Bill No. 91 of 2018) is an Act of the Oireachtas (Irish parliament) which provided for the following:

- The transfer of territory to Cork City Council area from Cork County Council area, with effect from the 2019 local elections, thereby implementing the Cork Local Government Implementation Oversight Group's recommendations
- The provision of plebiscites, which were held alongside the May 2019 local elections, to approve the principle of directly elected mayors for Cork City Council, Limerick City and County Council, and Waterford City and County Council, rejected in Cork and Waterford and only passed in Limerick. The proposed directly elected mayor for the Dublin metropolitan area was excluded from the act because of the greater complexity of the debate across four local government areas, with Fingal County Council having opposed previous proposals. Galway was also excluded because of the ongoing plans to merge Galway City Council and Galway County Council. On 2 April 2019 the government published more detailed proposals, agreed at the 20 March 2019 cabinet meeting, for the plebiscites and, for those passed, holding mayoral elections and granting powers to mayors. On 11 April 2019 the Dáil approved draft regulations for the plebiscites to take place. The Referendum Commission was not responsible for the plebiscites.
