= Carl Cederschiöld =

Swedish politician

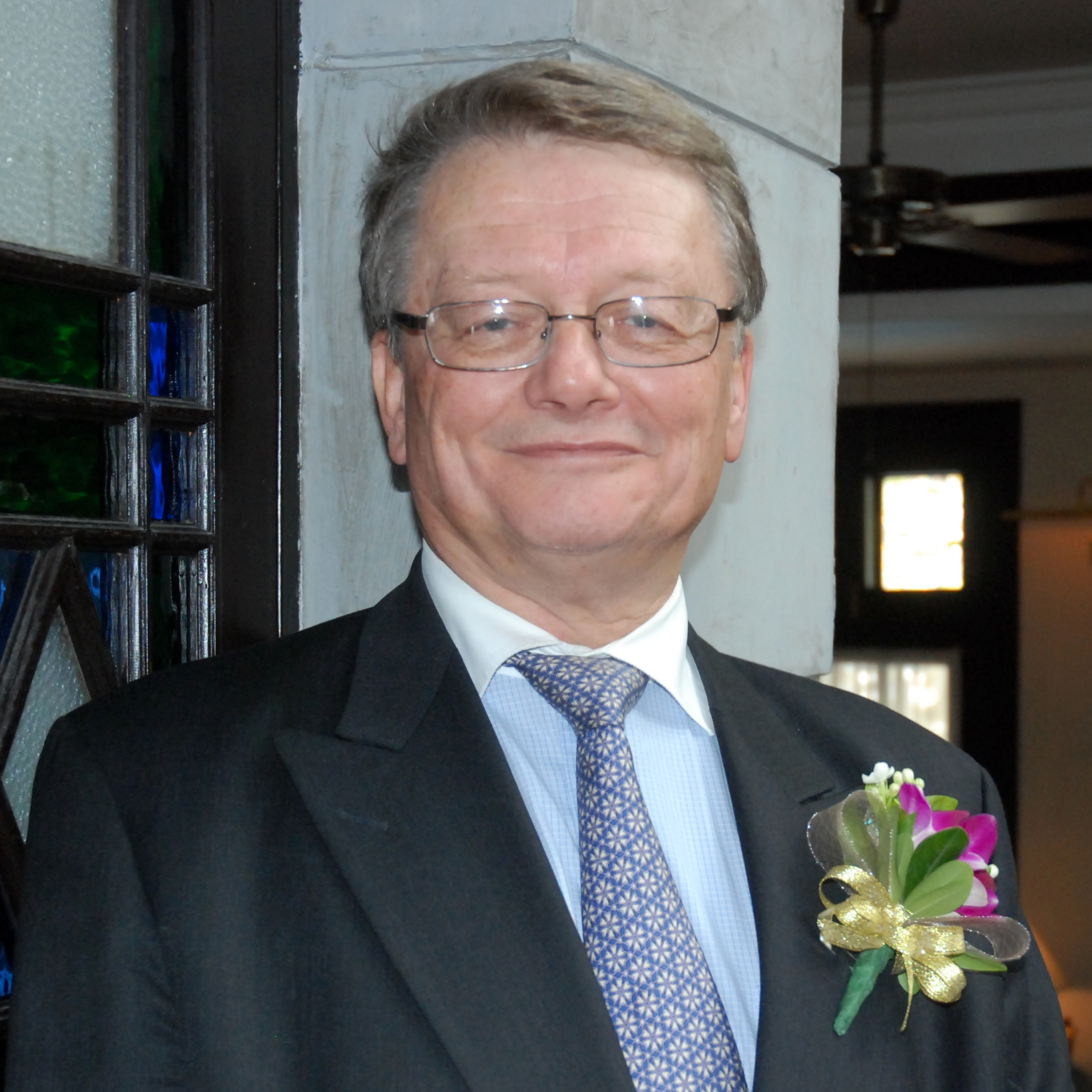

15th Mayor of Stockholm
- In office 1991–1994
- Preceded by: Mats Hulth
- Succeeded by: Mats Hulth
- In office 1998–2002
- Preceded by: Mats Hulth
- Succeeded by: Annika Billström

Personal details
- Born: 17 May 1945 (age 80) Stockholm, Sweden
- Party: Moderate Party
- Spouse: Charlotte Cederschiöld

Carl Hugo Thorsten Cederschiöld (born 17 Maj 1945) is a Swedish former Moderate Party politician.

He was an active member of the Confederation of Swedish Conservative and Liberal Students and was chairman between 1972 and 1973. He was elected to Stockholm City Council in 1976. With the Moderate election victory in 1991, Cederschiöld became Mayor and Commissioner of Finance. The Moderate Party, however, lost the election in 1994 and Cederschiöld returned to leading the opposition.

The 1998 election saw the return of the Moderate Party to power in Stockholm and Cederschiöld to the post of Mayor. The new Moderate Party administration launched a wide-reaching reform programme with cuts in both taxes and welfare benefits. The 2002 election, however, was catastrophic for the Moderate Party on the national level and that also swept the Social Democrats into power in Stockholm. After the election he retired from politics. He was replaced as leader of the Moderates in Stockholm by Kristina Axén Olin.

Carl Cederschiöld is married to Charlotte Cederschiöld, a Moderate Party Member of the European Parliament. The Cederschiöld family belongs to the Swedish nobility.

Preceded by Mats Hulth	Mayor of Stockholm; 1998 – 2002	Succeeded by Annika Billström
Preceded by Mats Hulth	Mayor of Stockholm; 1991 – 1994	Succeeded by Mats Hulth
