= Charlotte Cederschiöld =

Swedish politician (born 1944)

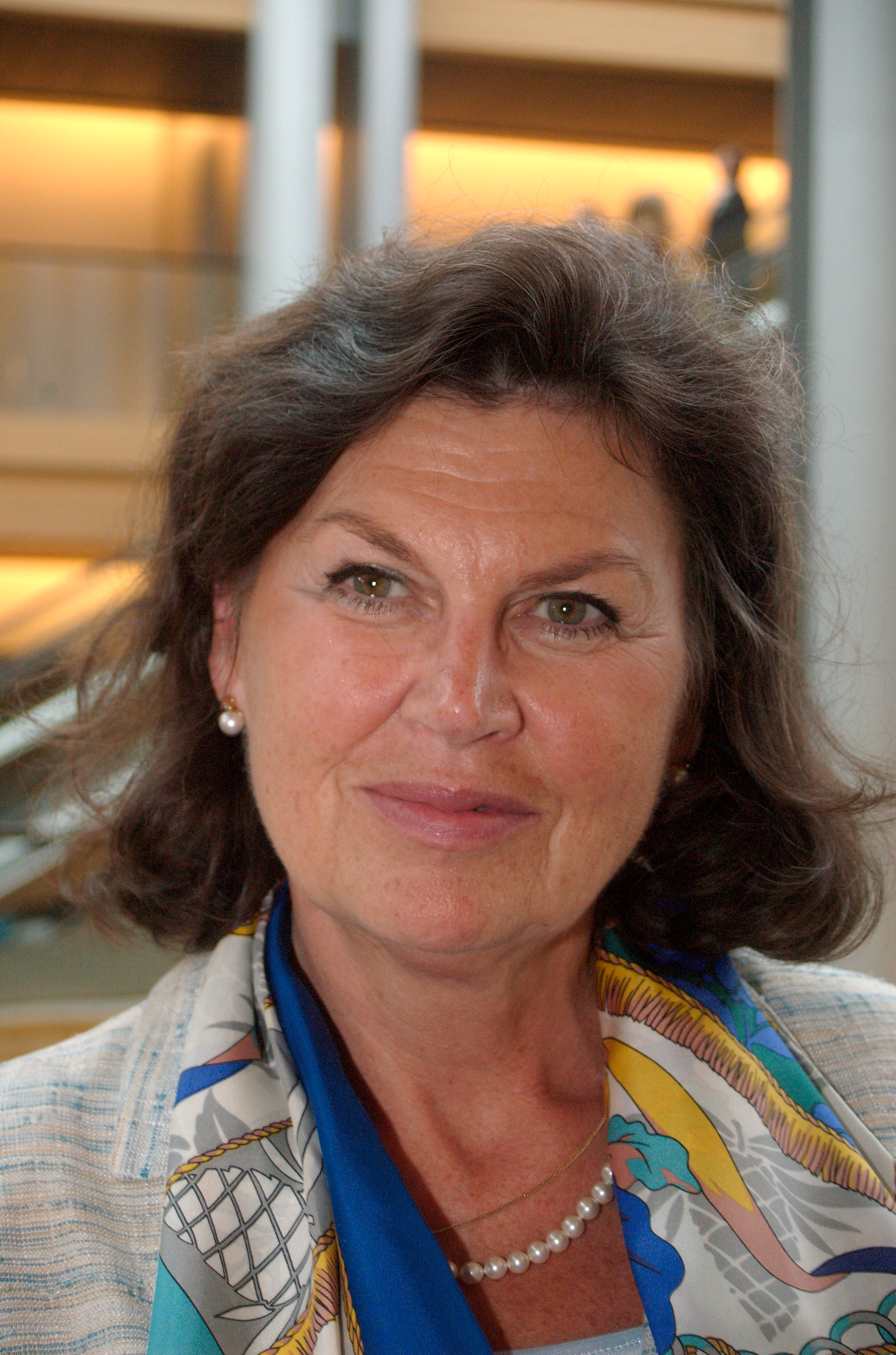
Charlotte Cederschiöld (2006)

Ulla Margareta Charlotte Cederschiöld (born 28 September 1944 in Gävle) is a Swedish politician, and was a Member of the European Parliament until 2009. She is a member of the Moderate Party, part of the European People's Party - European Democrats group.

She sits on the European Parliament's Committee on the Internal Market and Consumer Protection. She is also a substitute for the Committee on Civil Liberties, Justice, and Home Affairs, a member of the Delegation for relations with Russia, and a substitute for the Delegation for relations with the United States.

She has been married to Carl Cederschiöld since 1972, with whom she has two children Sebastian (1974) and Anna (1981).

She is a signatory of the Prague Declaration on European Conscience and Communism.

== Education ==
She graduated from Stockholm University in 1970, with a degree in political science, law, history and German, and after graduating became an information manager for the Swedish Institute and City of Stockholm Development and Promotion Office.

== Career ==
- Member Moderate Party executive 1990-1995
- Member Stockholm County Authority 1979-1988
- Member of Parliament (Riksdag) 1988-1995
- First vice-chair European Union of Women 1993-1999
- MEP 1995-
- Substitute to the Institutional Committee 1995-1999
- Vice-president European Parliament, bureau member and chairwoman of the Conciliation Committee 2001-2004
- Member of The Committee on Citizens' Freedoms and Rights, Justice and Home Affairs 1999-2004
- Substitute to The Committee on Legal Affairs and the Internal Market 1999-2004
- Member of The Delegation for relations with the United States 1999-2004
- Member of the Convention for Fundamental Rights (1999–2000)
- Member of The Mercosur Delegation 2004-2007
- Vice-chair of The Internal Market and Consumer Protection Committee 2004-2006
- Member of The Internal Market and Consumer Protection Committee 2007
- Substitute to The Delegation for Relations with the United States 2004-
- Member of the Civil Liberties, Justice and Home Affairs Committee 1995-2006
- Substitute to the Civil Liberties, Justice and Home Affairs Committee 2006
- Member of the Russia Delegation 2007
- Member of the Echelon committee
- Rapporteur on the following reports:

Attacks against information systems and communication networks, protection against counterfeiting the Euro, fight against drugs, organised crime, police co-operation in relation to synthetic drugs, intellectual property (The WIPO Treaties) and the development of the third pillar during the Intergovernmental Conference 1996-97. Fundamental rights, enhanced corporation, competition, crime prevention, shadow rapporteur on health in the single market, many reports on openness and transparency as well as data protection.

== See also ==
- 2004 European Parliament election in Sweden
