= Kristina Axén Olin =

Swedish politician (born 1962)

Kristina Axén Olin M
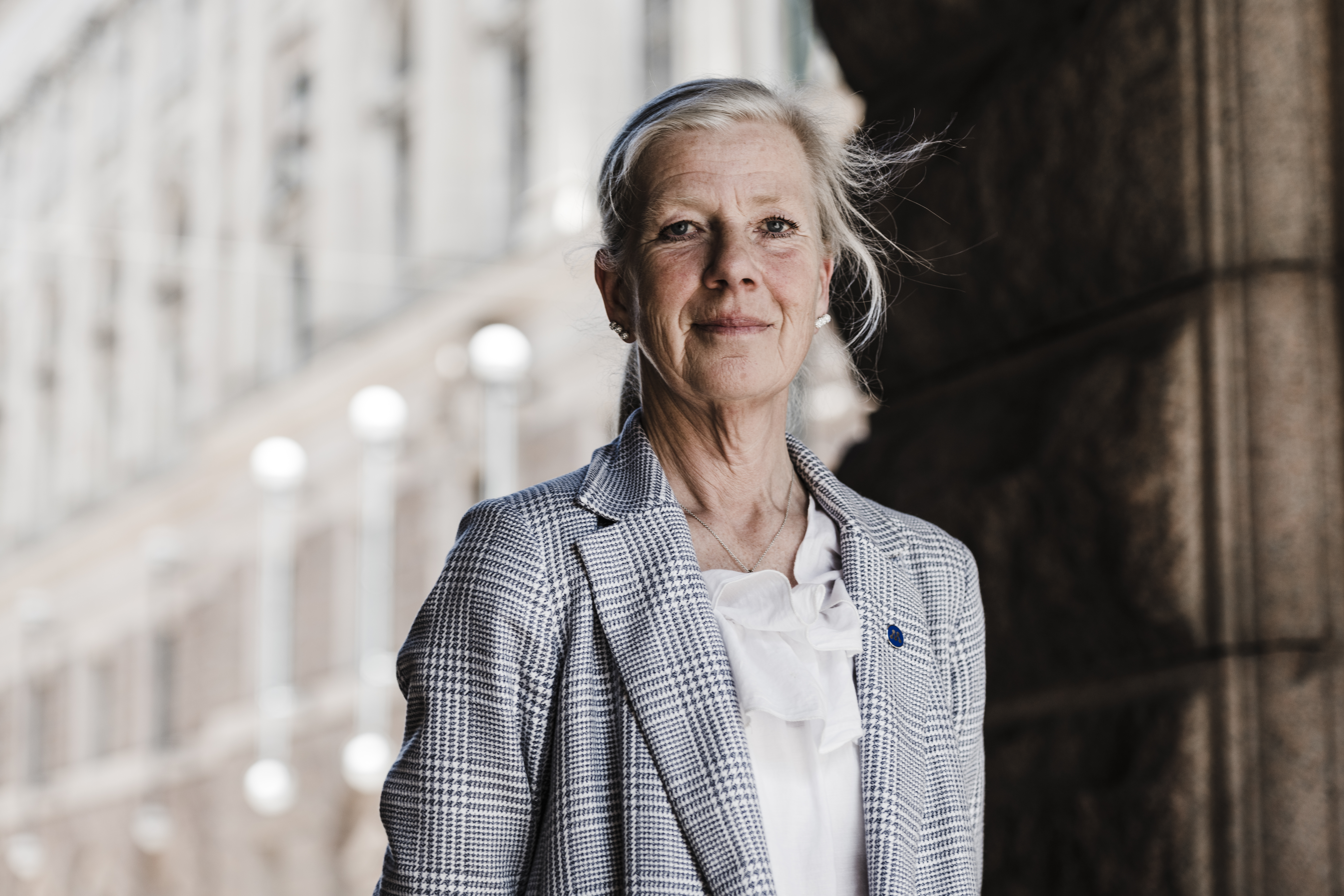
- Kristina Axén Olin in 2021

Member of the Riksdag for Stockholm Municipality
- Incumbent
- Assumed office 24 September 2018

17th Mayor of Stockholm
- In office 2006–2008
- Preceded by: Annika Billström
- Succeeded by: Sten Nordin

Personal details
- Born: 21 October 1962 (age 63) Stockholm, Sweden
- Party: Moderate
- Education: Royal College of Music, Stockholm
- Occupation: Politician
- Profession: Music teacher, principal

Anna Kristina Axén Olin (née Axén; born 21 October 1962) is a Swedish politician and a member of the Riksdag, she is currently serving as a member and the Second vice-speaker of the Education Committee. She is a member of the Moderate Party and currently takes up seat number 244 in the Riksdag. She was a member of the Justice Committee from her entry in the Riksdag until February 2019. She held the post of mayor of Stockholm between 2006 and 2008, being the city's second female mayor. She also served as deputy chairman of the party from 2003 to 2009, when she was replaced by Beatrice Ask.

== Biography ==
Kristina Axén Olin is the daughter of the sea captain Jan Bertil Axén, born 1933 and secretary Gunnel Birgitta, born 1936. Axén Olin is a trained music teacher and was previously principal for Maria Elementar, a private school in the Stockholm district of Södermalm. She was previously married to the communications consultant and entrepreneur Mats Olin. Axén Olin announced his resignation as finance councilor and Moderate group leader in the municipal council on April 16, 2008.

She currently lives with her husband and three children in the suburban borough of Enskede.

== Career ==
Axén Olin was elected to the Council in 1991. She has mainly been active in social issues and was Commissioner of Social Service under the Moderate Party administration of Carl Cederschiöld, 1998–2002. She served as chairman of the Stockholm County Police Authority 1999–2006. She is known for her liberalism and was one of the most senior Moderates to advocate adoption rights for homosexuals. She has also, however, become famous for her hardline stand on reducing welfare payments. She is also an advocate of chemical castration for rapists.

Axén Olin was Social Citizens' Council in Stockholm from 1998 until 2002, Opposition Citizens' Council from 2002 until 2006 and Finance Citizens' Council from 2006 until 2008. She has been a member of the Municipal Council since 1991 and was the group leader for the Moderate Party in Stockholm City Hall from 2002 until 2008. She was also the second deputy party chairwoman for the Moderate Party from 2003 to 2009, and was also chairwoman of the police board in Stockholm County from 1999 until 2006. Axén Olin has stated that British Prime Minister Margaret Thatcher is a political role model for her.

=== Riksdag ===
Axén Olin was elected to the Riksdag after the 2018 general election for the constituency of Stockholm Municipality. She was assigned to the Justice Committee after joining the Riksdag. She left the committee in February 2019 to join the Education Committee. After 13 days in the committee, she was promoted to second vice-speaker. She currently takes up seat number 244 in the Riksdag.

Preceded by Annika Billström	Mayor of Stockholm; 2006–2008	Succeeded by Sten Nordin
Preceded by Lena Nyberg	Commissioner of Social Service of Stockholm; 1999–2002	Succeeded by Margareta Olofsson
