= County Manager =

County Manager may refer to:

- Chief executive (Irish local government), formerly known as County or City Council manager
- County executive, in the United States
