= 1985 Swedish general election =

- 15 September 1985

All 349 seats in the Riksdag 175 seats needed for a majority
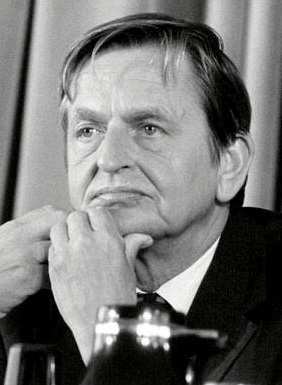

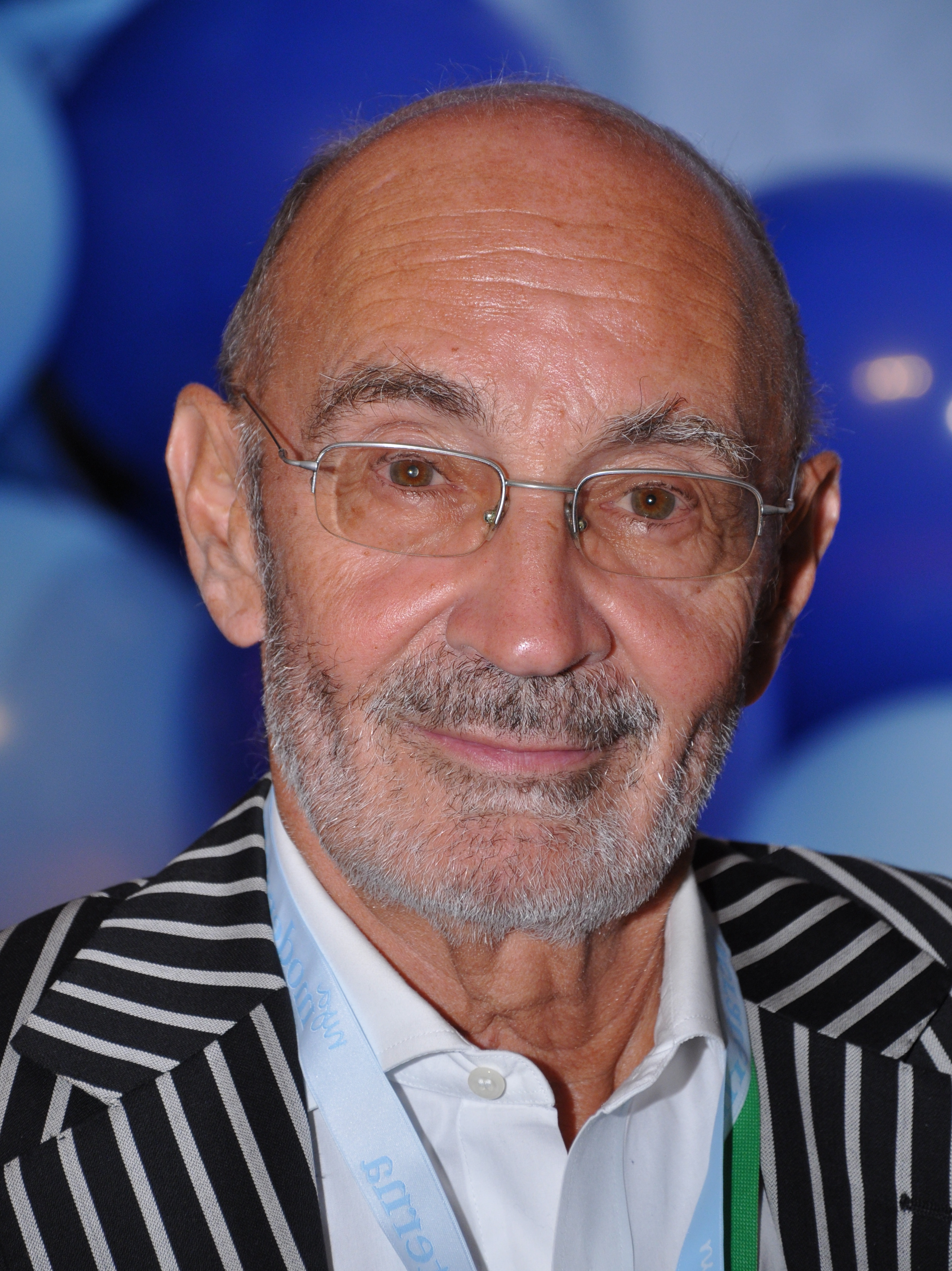

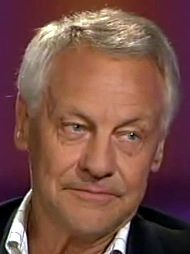

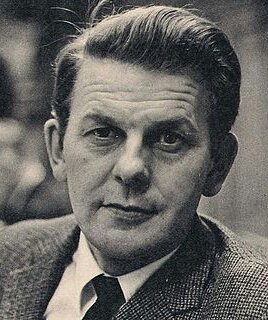

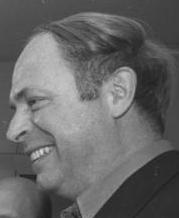

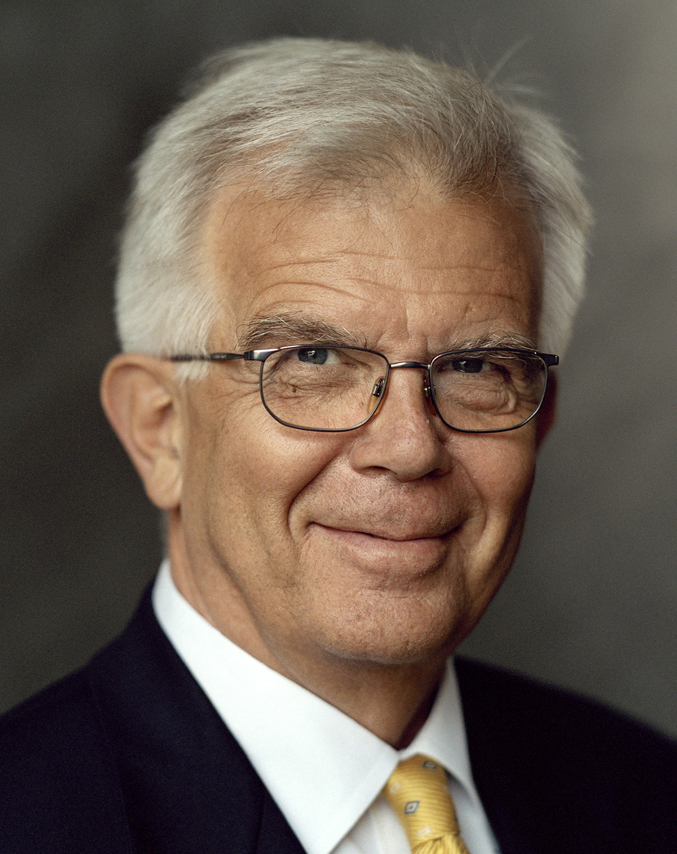
	First party	Second party	Third party
Leader	Olof Palme	Ulf Adelsohn	Bengt Westerberg
Party	Social Democrats	Moderate	Liberals
Last election	166	86	21
Seats won	159	76	51
Seat change	▼7	▼10	▲30
Popular vote	2,487,551	1,187,335	792,268
Percentage	44.68%	21.33%	14.23%
Swing	▼0.93 pp	▼2.31 pp	▲8.33 pp
	Fourth party	Fifth party	Sixth party
Leader	Thorbjörn Fälldin	Lars Werner	Alf Svensson
Party	Centre	Left-Communist	Christian Democrats
Last election	56	20	0
Seats won	43	19	1
Seat change	▼13	▼1	▲1
Popular vote	490,999	298,419	131,548
Percentage	8.82%	5.36%	2.36%
Swing	▼6.66 pp	▼0.20 pp	▲0.49 pp
- Map of the election, showing the distribution of constituency and levelling seats, as well as the largest political bloc within each constituency.
PM before election
Olof Palme
Social Democrats
Elected PM
Olof Palme
Social Democrats

General elections were held in Sweden on 15 September 1985. The Swedish Social Democratic Party remained the largest party in the Riksdag, winning 159 of the 349 seats. Incumbent prime minister Olof Palme of the Social Democrats was able form a minority government with support from the Left Party Communists. However, Palme was assassinated in 1986.

== Campaign ==
At a campaign meeting in Sundsvall on 22 August, Minister of Social Welfare Sten Andersson promised to increase the state pensions as a compensation for the price increases following the devaluation of the krona in 1982. The Social Democrat (Socialdemokraterna) government also stressed that it had managed to decrease the budget deficit from 90 billion to 60 billion kronas. The Social Democrats also promised not to increase taxes or lower the quality of the welfare system.

The Centre Party had a technical cooperation with the Christian Democrats. The Christian Democrats always received fewer votes than the 4% threshold for gaining seats to the Riksdag. The cooperation was criticized within the Centre Party. The aim was for both parties to gain votes, but in the end the Centre Party's share of the votes decreased in comparison to the previous election in 1982. The Christian Democrats only gained one seat in parliament for its leader, Alf Svensson.

The political debate was dominated by the Moderate Party and the Social Democrats. In January 1985, the Moderate Party had proposed in parliament a detailed plan with tax cuts and cuts in spending. The Social Democrats' leader Olof Palme managed to turn this against the Moderate Party by repeating the negative effects this would have on junior soccer teams. The Moderate Party was supported by 30 percent in an opinion poll by SIFO in June 1985, but its support decreased during the campaign.

The Liberal People's Party had chosen Bengt Westerberg as its party leader in October 1983; he had had trouble getting his message through, not least because of the party's small size in parliament and its only receiving 5.9 percent support in the 1982 election. However, in August Westerberg became viewed by the public as a calm and honest politician, in comparison to the constantly arguing Adelsohn and Palme. The Liberal People's Party was the big winner of the 1985 election, increasing its support to 14.2 percent.

== Debates ==
1985 Swedish general election debates
Date	Time	Organisers	Moderators	P Present I Invitee N Non-invitee					
Date	Time	Organisers	Moderators	S	M	C	L	V	Refs
28 Aug	19:30	Sveriges Television		P Olof Palme	P Ulf Adelsohn	N Thorbjörn Fälldin	N Ola Ullsten	N Lars Werner	
13 Sep	20:00	Sveriges Television	Ingemar Odlander	P: Olof Palme; Kjell-Olof Feldt	P Ulf Adelsohn	P Thorbjörn Fälldin	P Bengt Westerberg	P Lars Werner	

== Results ==
The Centre Party and Christian Democratic Unity (CDU) ran a joint list in some constituencies under the name "Centre". One CDU candidate was elected on the Centre list, the first time the party got parliamentary representation.

Party	Votes	%	Seats	+/–
Swedish Social Democratic Party	2,487,551	44.68	159	–7
Moderate Party	1,187,335	21.33	76	–10
People's Party	792,268	14.23	51	+30
Centre Party	490,999	8.82	43	–13
Left Party Communists	298,419	5.36	19	–1
Christian Democratic Unity	131,548	2.36	0	0
Green Party	83,645	1.50	0	0
Centre (CDU–C)	73,711	1.32	1	–
Other parties	21,546	0.39	0	0
Total	5,567,022	100.00	349	0
Valid votes	5,567,022	99.14		
Invalid/blank votes	48,220	0.86		
Total votes	5,615,242	100.00		
Registered voters/turnout	6,249,445	89.85		
Source: Nohlen & Stöver

=== Seat distribution ===
Constituency	Total seats	Seats won							
Constituency	Total seats	By party						By coalition	
Constituency	Total seats	S	M	F	C	V	KDS	Left	Right
Älvsborg North	10	4	2	2	2			4	6
Älvsborg South	7	3	2	1	1			3	4
Blekinge	6	3	1	1	1			3	3
Bohus	12	5	3	2	2			5	7
Fyrstadskretsen	20	9	6	3	1	1		10	10
Gävleborg	13	7	2	1	2	1		8	5
Gothenburg	18	7	4	4	1	2		9	9
Gotland	2	1			1			1	1
Halland	10	4	2	2	2			4	6
Jämtland	5	3	1		1			3	2
Jönköping	13	5	3	2	2		1	5	8
Kalmar	10	5	2	1	2			5	5
Kopparberg	12	6	2	1	2	1		7	5
Kristianstad	12	5	3	2	2			5	7
Kronoberg	7	3	2	1	1			3	4
Malmöhus	12	5	3	2	2			5	7
Norrbotten	11	7	1	1	1	1		8	3
Örebro	12	6	2	2	1	1		7	5
Östergötland	16	8	3	2	2	1		9	7
Skaraborg	11	5	2	2	2			5	6
Södermanland	9	5	2	1	1			5	4
Stockholm County	36	14	11	6	2	3		17	19
Stockholm Municipality	29	11	9	5	1	3		14	15
Uppsala	11	5	2	2	1	1		6	5
Värmland	12	6	2	1	2	1		7	5
Västerbotten	11	5	1	2	2	1		6	5
Västernorrland	11	6	1	1	2	1		7	4
Västmanland	11	6	2	1	1	1		7	4
Total	349	159	76	51	43	19	1	178	171
Source: Statistics Sweden

=== By municipality ===
Votes by municipality. The municipalities are the color of the party that got the most votes within the coalition that won relative majority.

Cartogram of the map to the left with each municipality rescaled to the number of valid votes cast.

Map showing the voting shifts from the 1982 to the 1985 election. Darker blue indicates a municipality voted more towards the parties that formed the centre-right bloc. Darker red indicates a municipality voted more towards the parties that form the left-wing bloc.

Votes by municipality as a scale from red/Left-wing bloc to blue/Centre-right bloc.

Cartogram of vote with each municipality rescaled in proportion to number of valid votes cast. Deeper blue represents a relative majority for the centre-right coalition, brighter red represents a relative majority for the left-wing coalition.
