= Committee on Education (Sweden) =

Swedish parliamentary committee

The (Parliamentary) Committee on Education (Swedish: Utbildningsutskottet, UbU) is a parliamentary committee in the Swedish Riksdag. The committee's areas of responsibility concern schools, preschools, higher education, research on education, and financial aid for students.

The committee's speaker is Fredrik Malm from the Liberals since 2022 and the vice-speaker is Åsa Westlund from the Social Democratic Party since 2022.

== List of speakers for the committee ==
Name	Period	Political party
Lars Gustafsson	1986–1991	Social Democratic Party
Ann-Cathrine Haglund	1991–1993	Moderate Party
Hans Nyhage	1993–1994	Moderate Party
Berit Löfstedt	1994–1995	Social Democratic Party
Jan Björkman	1995–2006	Social Democratic Party
Sofia Larsen	2006–2010	Centre Party
Margareta Pålsson	2010–2012	Moderate Party
Tomas Tobé	2012–2014	Moderate Party
Lena Hallengren	2014–2018	Social Democratic Party
Matilda Ernkrans	2018–2019	Social Democratic Party
Gunilla Svantorp	2019–2022	Social Democratic Party
Fredrik Malm	2022–	Liberals

== List of vice-speakers for the committee ==
Name	Period	Political party	Notes
Lena Hjelm-Wallén	1991–1994	Social Democratic Party	
Beatrice Ask	1994–1998	Moderate Party	
Britt-Marie Danestig	1998–2006	Left Party	
Marie Granlund	2006–2010	Social Democratic Party	
Mikael Damberg	2010–2012	Social Democratic Party	
Ibrahim Baylan	2012–2014	Social Democratic Party	
Torkild Strandberg	2014	Liberals	
Christer Nylander	2014–2018	Liberals	
Roger Haddad	2018–2022	Liberals	
Kristina Axén Olin	2019–2022	Moderate Party	Second vice-speaker
Åsa Westlund	2022–	Social Democratic Party	
