= Hjalmar Mehr =

Swedish politician

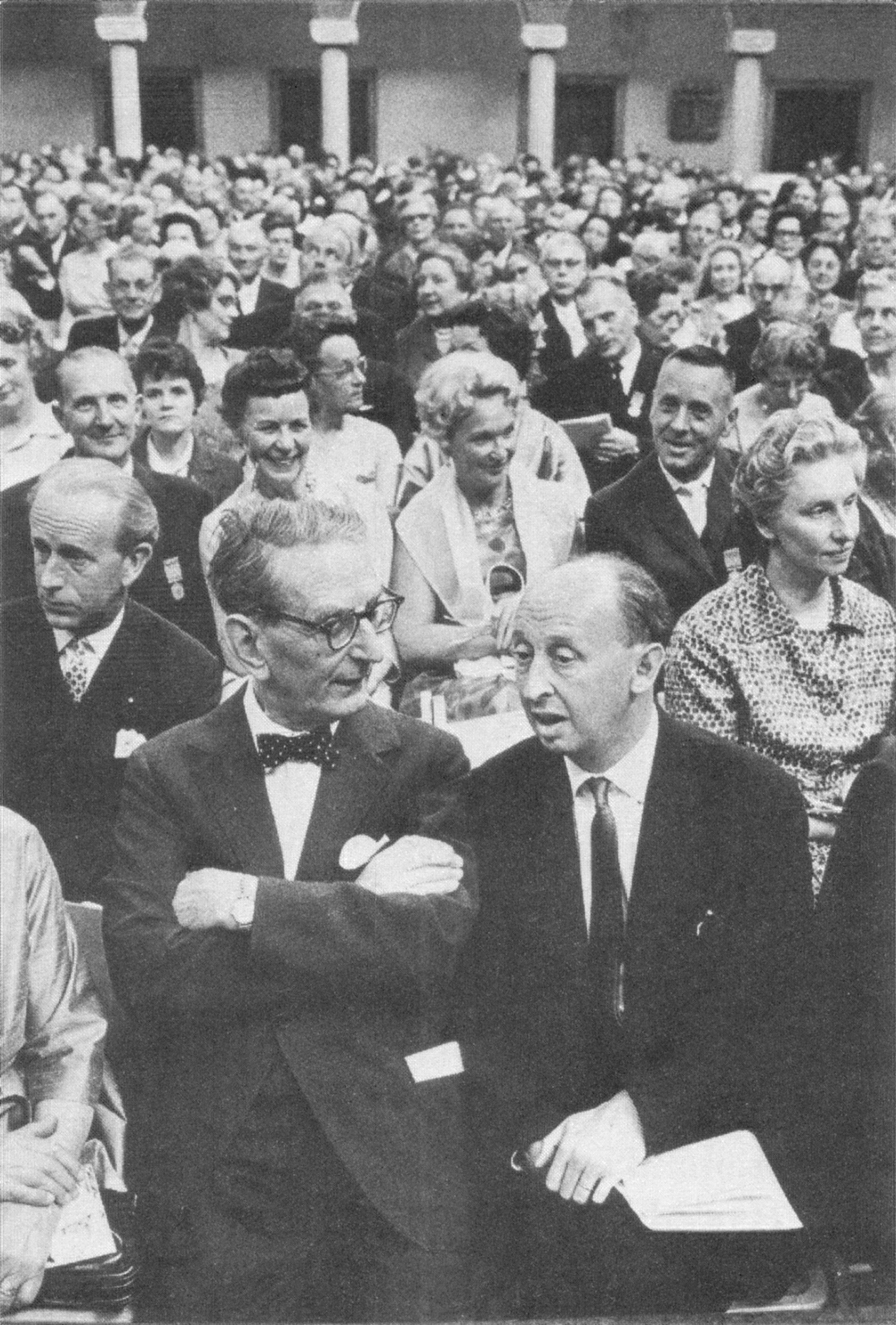
- Hjalmar Mehr (right) with former Borgarråd Yngve Larsson inside Stockholm City Hall 1963

8th Mayor of Stockholm
- In office 15 October 1958 – 15 October 1966
- Monarch: Gustaf VI Adolf
- Preceded by: Erik Huss
- Succeeded by: Per-Olof Hansson
- In office 15 October 1970 – 30 September 1971
- Monarch: Gustaf VI Adolf
- Preceded by: Thorsten Sundström
- Succeeded by: Albert Aronsson

Governor of Stockholm County
- In office 1971–1977
- Monarchs: Gustaf VI Adolf; Carl XVI Gustaf
- Preceded by: Allan Nordenstam
- Succeeded by: Gunnar Helén

Personal details
- Born: 19 November 1910; Sankt Matteus församling
- Died: 26 December 1979 (aged 69); Adelsö församling
- Political party: Social Democrats
- Spouse: Liselotte Lina Meyer (m. 1937)
- Occupation: Politician

Hjalmar Leo Mehr (19 November 1910 – 26 December 1979) was a Swedish Social Democratic politician, mayor of Stockholm (1958–1966, 1970–1971) and governor of Stockholm County (1971–1977). He promoted many radical socialist welfare state policies but is mostly remembered and criticized for the redevelopment of Norrmalm, where a significant part of the old Stockholm was demolished.

In 1969, Mehr was elected president of the newly established Swedish Association of Local Authorities (Svenska Kommunförbundet), an association that existed from 1969 to 2007 (now the Swedish Association of Regions) to interact with the Riksdag of Sweden.

Mehr's parents, Sara and Bernhard Meyerowitch, were Russian-Jewish revolutionaries (mensheviks) who after the failed 1905 Russian Revolution fled to Sweden, where Hjalmar was born and named after Hjalmar Branting.

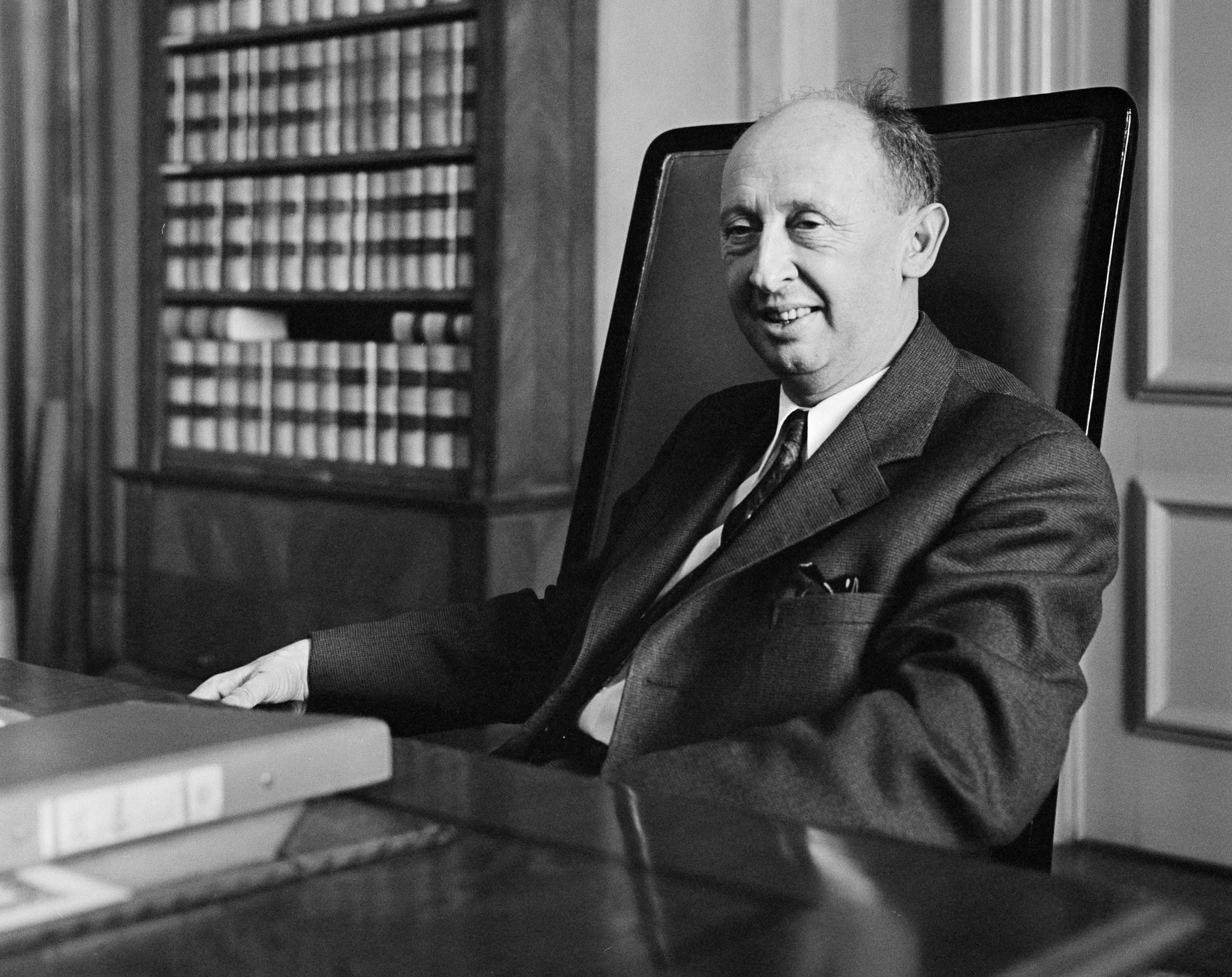
Hjalmar Mehr

Preceded by created in 1969	President of the Swedish Association of Local Authorities; 1969–1971	Succeeded by Inge Hörlén
