= Proposed directly elected mayor for the Dublin metropolitan area =

There have been several proposals for a directly elected mayor of the Dublin metropolitan area in Ireland. The area corresponds to County Dublin, and comprises four local authority areas, namely the city of Dublin and the counties of South Dublin, Fingal, and Dún Laoghaire–Rathdown. Currently, the elected councillors of each local authority area choose a chairperson or mayor annually from among their number as a ceremonial head with no extra powers. The chairperson of Dublin City Council is the Lord Mayor of Dublin, a ceremonial position separate from the proposed executive mayor. This is similar to the distinction between the ancient office of Lord Mayor of London and the office of Mayor of London established in 2000.

== Debate ==
Advocates have claimed that giving a directly elected mayor some of the executive powers currently held by unelected local authority chief executives would improve legitimacy, accountability, and public engagement with local government. Political consultant Derek S. Mooney opposed the plan as not addressing the powerlessness of local government and likely to create a personality clash between the mayor and the Taoiseach of the day. Fingal County Council members have opposed the plan on the basis that its agenda would be swamped by the needs of the core urban centre.

== 2001 act ==
The Local Government Act 2001 provided for directly elected mayors beginning at the 2004 local elections, but a 2003 amendment repealed this provision.

== 2010 bill ==
The government programme agreed by the Fianna Fáil–Green coalition formed after the 2007 general election promised to consider directly elected mayors, and a 2008 green paper proposed such a mayor for Dublin at first and other cities later. The minister John Gormley made a commitment to a Dublin mayor on 12 May 2009 and was supported by Fine Gael in a September adjournment debate. In July 2010, Gormley expected the first election to be that October. The Local Government (Mayor and Regional Authority of Dublin) Bill 2010 had reached committee stage when it lapsed on the dissolution of the Dáil before the 2011 general election.

== 2014 act ==
The Local Government Reform Act 2014 passed by the Fine Gael—Labour coalition formed after the 2011 general election made widespread changes to local government, including provision for a "Directly Elected Mayor for Dublin Metropolitan Area". The act specified several stages in the process leading to the creation of the office of mayor:

- the four local authorities' councils would send delegates to a forum to agree a draft plan for the mayor's functions. This forum in fact met in April 2013, before the bill had been introduced; after public consultations, the resulting report was submitted in late 2013, before the bill became law. The Act retrospectively sanctioned these steps.
- the Minister would approve the draft. This happened in March 2014.
- each council had to vote to put the draft to a plebiscite Fingal County Council voted 16–6 to reject it on 31 March 2014, obviating the need for subsequent steps. The other three councils voted for the plebiscite.

The following steps provided for under the Act did not happen because of Fingal's rejection:

- at the plebiscite, a majority of local election voters across the four authorities' areas would have to approve the proposal
- the government would choose to implement the proposal, and the Oireachtas would enact new legislation to effect this.
- an election would be held, under the terms of the new legislation, for the post of mayor.

Those supporting and opposing the original plan called on the Minister to revise the proposal. On 10 June 2014 he told the Dáil, "The Government remains committed to the notion of a plebiscite for a directly elected mayor for Dublin, and it appears that it is down to me to come up with a fresh initiative in view of the failure of the forum to achieve that consensus."

== 32nd Dáil ==
In 2016, Fianna Fáil and the Green Party both introduced private member's bills proposing directly elected mayors. The Fine Gael-led coalition formed after the 2016 general election is a minority government relying on confidence and supply support from Fianna Fáil, and the parties agreed to postpone the second stage of the Fianna Fáil bill until 30 June 2017. The bill envisaged a plebiscite in 2018 with the mayor elected as part of the 2019 local elections. The mayor would serve a five-year term, with elections at the same time as those for the city and county councils. In September 2017, the government announced its intention to amend the constitution to provide for directly elected mayors; the necessary referendum was tentatively scheduled for October 2018, alongside a presidential election and two other referendums. This did not happen.

The Local Government Act 2019 provides for plebiscites for directly elected mayors for Cork City Council, Limerick City and County Council and Waterford City and County Council alongside the May 2019 local elections. On 27 September 2018 the government decided not to include Dublin in the plebiscites: "In view of the complexities of local government in County Dublin and the Dublin Metropolitan Area ... it was deemed appropriate ... to allow space for detailed and informed public discourse on the matter", which will to be discussed by a "Dublin Citizens' Assembly" to be set up in 2019. The plebiscite went ahead in the other three local authorities and was passed at the 2019 Limerick City and County Council election but fell in both Cork and Waterford.

== See also ==
- Directly elected mayors in England
