= Mats Hulth =

Swedish politician (born 1946)

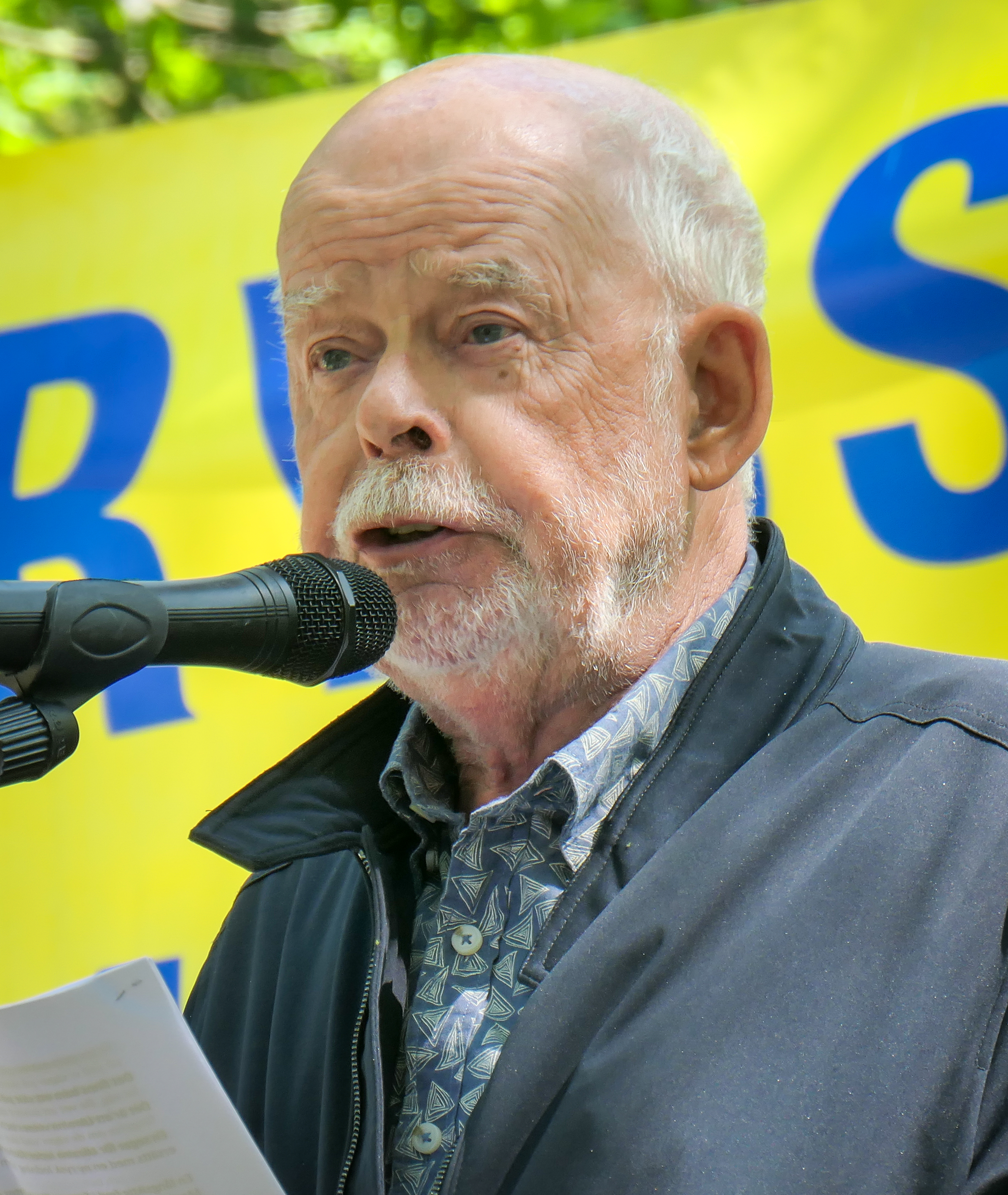
- Hulth in 2023

Mayor of Stockholm
- In office 1994–1998
- Preceded by: Carl Cederschiöld
- Succeeded by: Carl Cederschiöld
- In office 1988–1991
- Preceded by: Sture Palmgren
- Succeeded by: Carl Cederschiöld

Personal details
- Born: 22 January 1946 (age 79); Stockholm, Sweden
- Political party: Swedish Social Democratic Party

Mats Hulth (born 22 January 1946) is a Swedish politician of the Social Democratic Party. He served as mayor of Stockholm twice (1988–1991, 1994–1998).

Preceded by Carl Cederschiöld	Mayor of Stockholm; 1994 – 1998	Succeeded by Carl Cederschiöld
Preceded by Sture Palmgren	Mayor of Stockholm; 1988 – 1991	Succeeded by Carl Cederschiöld
