= Karin Wanngård =

Swedish politician (born 1975)

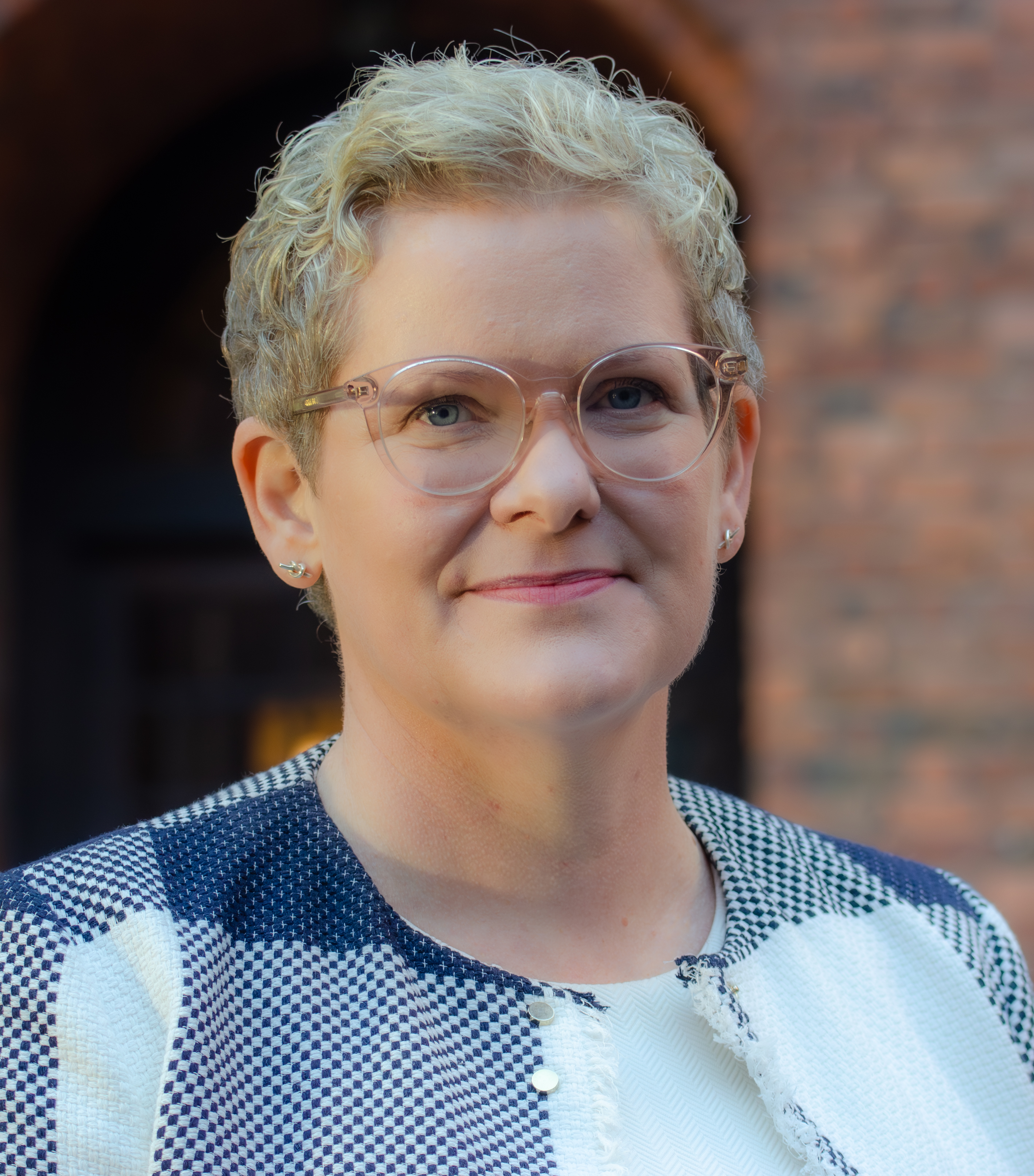
- Wanngård in 2022

20th & 22nd Mayor of Stockholm
- In office 17 October 2022 – 19 October 2026
- Preceded by: Anna König Jerlmyr
- Succeeded by: Emilia Bjuggren
- In office 20 October 2014 – 15 October 2018
- Preceded by: Sten Nordin
- Succeeded by: Anna König Jerlmyr

Personal details
- Born: 29 June 1975 (age 51) Ekerö, Sweden
- Party: Social Democratic
- Spouse: Stefan Johansson
- Children: 4
- Occupation: Politician

Karin Björnsdotter Wanngård (born 29 June 1975) is a Swedish politician who served as mayor of Stockholm from 2022 to 2026 and who previously served in that capacity from 2014 to 2018. She is a member of the Social Democrats, and has been city councillor of Stockholm Municipality since 1994.

Wanngård was appointed leader of the Social Democrats in Stockholm Municipality in 2011, and served as the city's leader of the opposition until 2014. Following the 2014 municipal election, Wanngård formed a coalition consisting of her own Social Democrats, the Green Party, the Left Party, and the Feminist Initiative, which together held a majority in the city council.

In early 2017, Wanngård's government planned to close the city's last coal plant by 2022 and eliminate all fossil fuel usage by the city by 2040. At the time, she was part of an increasing number of women leading cities taking steps to combat climate change.
