= Anna König Jerlmyr =

Swedish politician (born 1978)

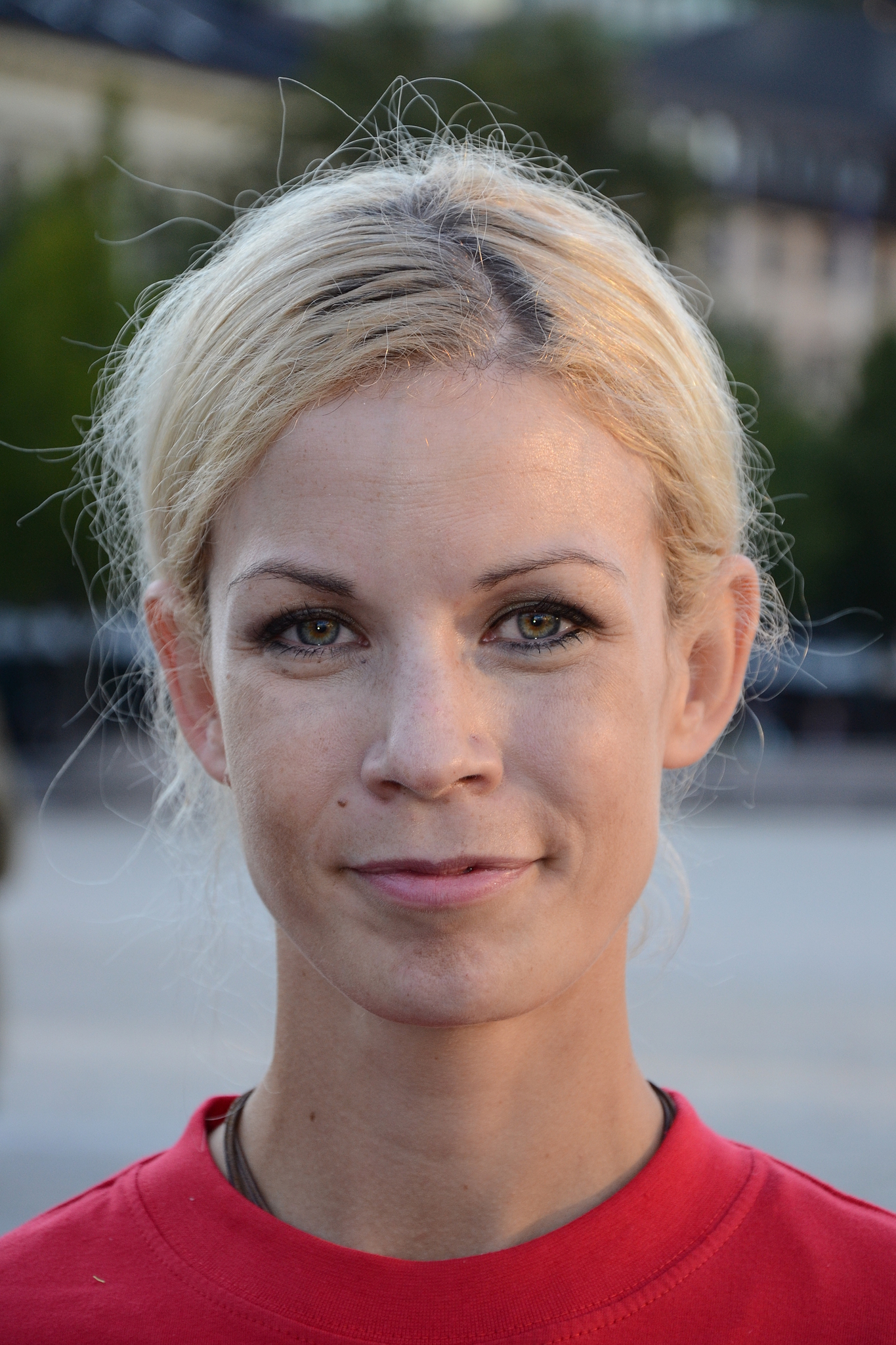
- Jerlmyr in 2011

21st Mayor of Stockholm
- In office 15 October 2018 – 17 October 2022
- Preceded by: Karin Wanngård
- Succeeded by: Karin Wanngård

Member of the Swedish Riksdag for Stockholm Municipality
- In office 2006–2010

Personal details
- Born: 9 May 1978 (age 47) Stockholm, Sweden
- Party: Moderate
- Occupation: Politician

Anna Margaretha König Jerlmyr (born 9 May 1978) is a Swedish politician who served as mayor of Stockholm from 2018 to 2022. She is a member of the Moderate Party.

She was a member of the Riksdag from 2006 to 2010. Between 2010 and 2014 she was responsible for social affairs (Swedish: socialborgarråd) in Stockholm Municipality and from 2014 to 2018 as the leader of the opposition in Stockholm (Swedish: oppositionsborgarråd). She was elected mayor of Stockholm following the 2018 election.
