= John-Olof Persson =

Swedish politician (1938–1989)

John-Olof Persson (28 August 1938 – 8 May 1989), often called "John-Olle", was a Swedish politician. He was a member of the Swedish Social Democratic Party, and Mayor of Stockholm 1973-1976 and 1979-1986.

From 1983 to 1986, Persson was the president of the Swedish Association of Local Authorities (Svenska Kommunförbundet), an association that existed from 1969 to 2007 (now the Swedish Association of Regions) to interact with the Riksdag of Sweden.

Persson died in an airplane accident in Oskarshamn, Sweden in 1989.

Preceded by Inge Hörlén	President of the Swedish Association of Local Authorities; 1983–1986	Succeeded by Lars-Eric Ericsson
