= Annika Billström =

Swedish politician (born 1956)

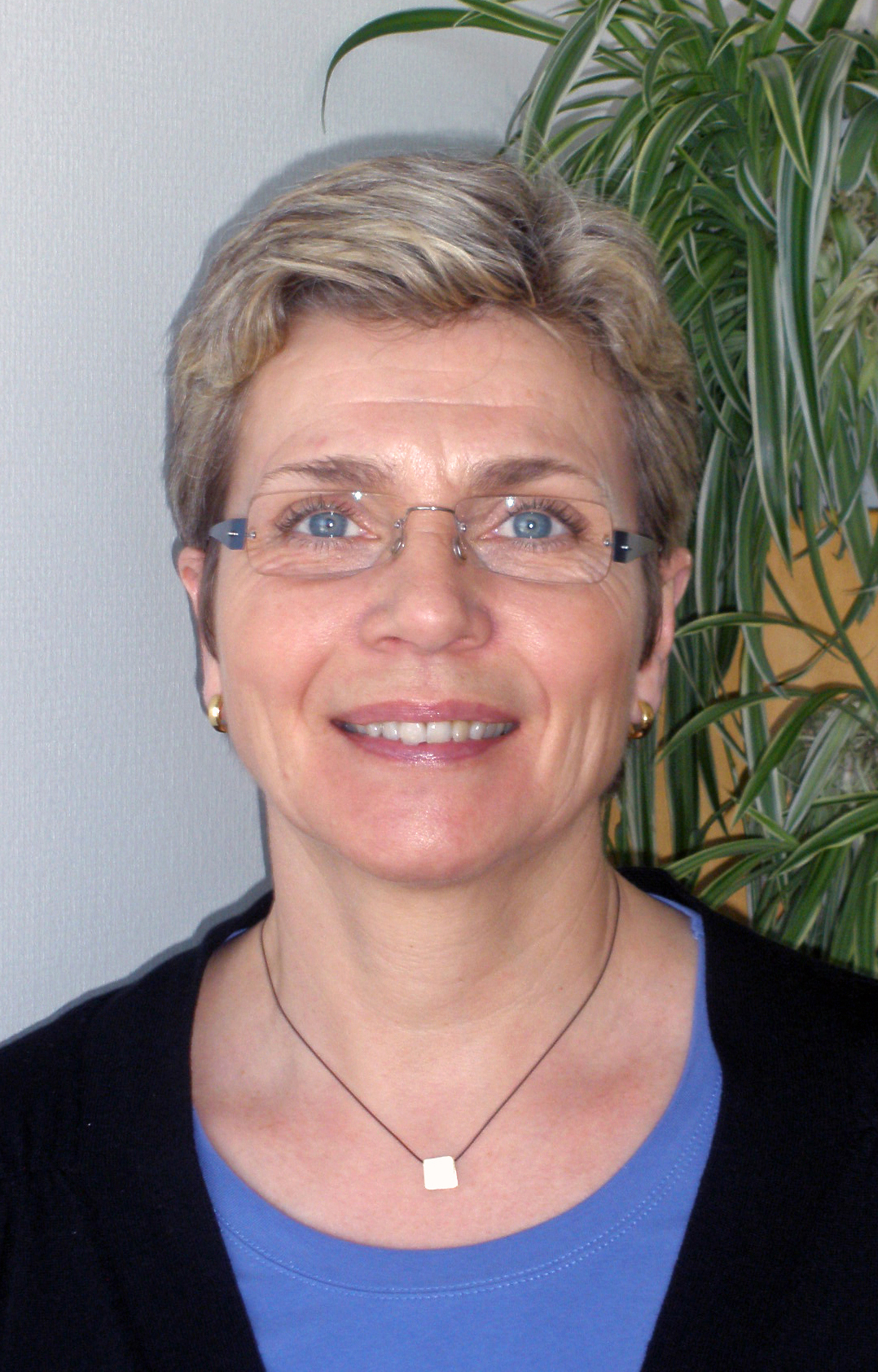

16th Mayor of Stockholm
- In office October 2004 – September 2006
- Preceded by: Carl Cederschiöld
- Succeeded by: Kristina Axén Olin

Personal details
- Born: 7 April 1956 (age 69) Härnösand, Sweden
- Party: Social Democratic

Annika Billström (born 7 April 1956) is a Swedish politician. She was the first female mayor of Stockholm, serving between 2004 and 2006. She is a member of the Social Democrats.

== Background ==
Billström's background was as the chief financial officer of Handels, the Swedish Commercial Employees' Union between 1987 and 1994. She was elected to the Stockholm City Council, serving as road commissioner in 1994–98 and commissioner in opposition from 1998 to 2002.

== Mayoralty ==
Billström was appointed mayor of Stockholm in 2002 by the City Council after winning the municipal election and forming a majority with the Left party and the Green party. Two of her decisions as mayor in particular were controversial, the first being the new Stockholm congestion tax that was introduced for vehicles entering the centre of Stockholm. The congestion tax was decided on a municipality-level to ensure support by the Green Party for the newly formed Social democratic cabinet and Billström was forced to honor this agreement even though she had promised not to in the run up to the 2002 election. In 2006 a referendum was held to let the people of Stockholm determine whether they wanted the entry tolls permanented or not, with more than 51% voting yes. The entry tolls were thus enforced by the conservative majority ruling 2006–10. Billström's other decision was to turn a central building in Stockholm (Skatteskrapan på Södermalm) into student housing, which was criticised for being expensive for taxpayers.

After losing the election in 2006, Billström stepped down and was replaced by Carin Jämtin.

Preceded by Carl Cederschiöld	Mayor of Stockholm; 2002–2006	Succeeded by Kristina Axén Olin
