= Mayor =

Head of municipal government such as a town or city

In many countries, a mayor is the highest-ranking executive official in a municipal government such as that of a city or a town. Worldwide, there is a wide variance in local laws and customs regarding the powers and responsibilities of a mayor as well as the means by which a mayor is elected or otherwise mandated. Depending on the system chosen, a mayor may be the chief executive officer of the municipal government, may simply chair a multi-member governing body with little or no independent power, or may play a solely ceremonial role. A mayor's duties and responsibilities may be to appoint and oversee municipal managers and employees, provide basic governmental services to constituents, and execute the laws and ordinances passed by a municipal governing body (or mandated by a state, territorial or national governing body). Options for selection of a mayor include direct election by the public, or selection by an elected governing council or board.

The term mayor shares a linguistic origin with the military rank of major, both ultimately derived from French majeur, which in turn derives from Latin maior, the comparative form of the adjective magnus.

== History ==
=== United Kingdom ===
In modern England and Wales, the position of mayor descends from the feudal lord's bailiff or reeve (see borough). The chief magistrate of London bore the title of portreeve for considerably more than a century after the Norman Conquest. This official was elected by popular choice, a privilege secured from King John. By the beginning of the 12th century, the title of portreeve gave way to that of mayor as the designation of the chief officer of London, followed around 1190 by that of Winchester. Other boroughs adopted the title later.

In the 19th century, the Municipal Corporations Act 1882, Section 15, regulated the election of mayors. The mayor was to be a fit person elected annually on 9 November by the council of the borough from among the aldermen or councilors or persons qualified to be such. His term of office was one year, but he was eligible for re-election. He might appoint a deputy to act during illness or absence, and such deputy must be either an alderman or councilor. A mayor who was absent from the borough for more than two months became disqualified and had to vacate his office. A mayor was ex officio a justice of the peace for the borough during his year of office and the following year. He received such remuneration as the council thought reasonable. These provisions have now been repealed.

In medieval Wales, the Laws of Hywel Dda codified the mayor (Latin: maior; Welsh: maer) as a position at the royal courts charged with administering the serfs of the king's lands. To maintain its dependence on and loyalty to the Crown, the position was forbidden to the leaders of the clan groups. A separate mayor, known as the "cow dung mayor" (maer biswail), was charged with overseeing the royal cattle. There were similar offices at the Scottish and Irish courts.

The office of mayor in most modern English and Welsh boroughs and towns did not in the 20th century entail any important administrative duties and was generally regarded as an honor conferred for local distinction, long service on the council, or for past services. The mayor was expected to devote much of their time to civic, ceremonial, and representational functions, and to preside over meetings for the advancement of the public welfare. The administrative duties of mayors were to act as returning officer at parliamentary elections and to chair the meetings of the council.

The mayor of a town council is officially known as "town mayor" (although in popular parlance, the word town is often dropped). The person is known as "mayor" regardless of gender; the wife of a male mayor is traditionally known as the "mayoress". Since the 1974 local government reforms, mayors are also appointed to English local government districts which have borough status. This results in mayors of districts which include towns which also have separate mayors. In districts which do not have borough status, the role of civic leader is taken by the chairman of the council, who undertakes exactly the same functions as a mayor of a district with borough status.

Many major cities in the United Kingdom and throughout the Commonwealth have a lord mayor, a special recognition bestowed by the sovereign. Although the position is often ceremonial, with executive responsibilities under the control of an elected mayor, lord mayors in several Commonwealth cities including Belfast, Cardiff, Brisbane, and Dublin hold both ceremonial and executive duties. Some lord mayors, including the lord mayor of Sydney (Australia), are elected.

In Scotland the post holders are known as convenors, provosts, or lord provosts depending on the local authority.

==== Directly elected mayors ====
Since reforms introduced in 2000, a number of English local authorities have directly elected mayors who combine the "civic" mayor role with that of leader of the council and have greater powers than either. Areas which now have directly elected mayors include cities, local government districts which cover several towns and rural areas.

In 2014 combined authority areas where created which, similarly to the Greater London Authority, include two or more local authority districts. The mayors (also known as metro mayors or regional mayors) who lead these authority areas have much more expansive devolved governmental powers compared to their local council counterparts who do not, and have responsibility for larger geographical areas that can include multiple cities and towns. These regional mayors have a much larger political significance and are seen as the chief representative for their region, they sit on the Mayoral Council for England and the Council of the Nations and Regions, where they sit alongside leaders from the UK government and devolved governments of Scotland, Wales and Northern Ireland.

=== Continental Europe ===
The original Frankish mayors or majordomos were – like the Welsh meiri – lords commanding the king's lands around the Merovingian courts in Austrasia, Burgundy, and Neustria. The mayorship of Paris eventually became hereditary in the Pippinids, who later established the Carolingian dynasty.

In modern France, since the Revolution, a mayor (maire) and a number of mayoral adjuncts (adjoints au maire) are selected by the municipal council from among their number. Most of the administrative work is left in their hands, with the full council meeting comparatively infrequently. The model was copied throughout Europe in Britain's mayors, Italy's sindacos, most of the German states' burgomasters, and Portugal's presidents of the municipal chambers.

In medieval Italy, the city-states who did not consider themselves independent principalities or dukedoms – particularly those of the Imperial Ghibelline faction – were led by podestàs.

The Greek equivalent of a mayor is the demarch (Greek: δήμαρχος, lit. 'archon of the deme').

==== Scandinavia ====
In Denmark all municipalities are led by a political official called borgmester, 'mayor'. The mayor of Copenhagen is however called overborgmester 'lord mayor'. In that city other mayors, borgmestre (plural), are subordinate to the lord mayor with different undertakings, like ministers to a prime minister. In other municipalities in Denmark there is only a single mayor.

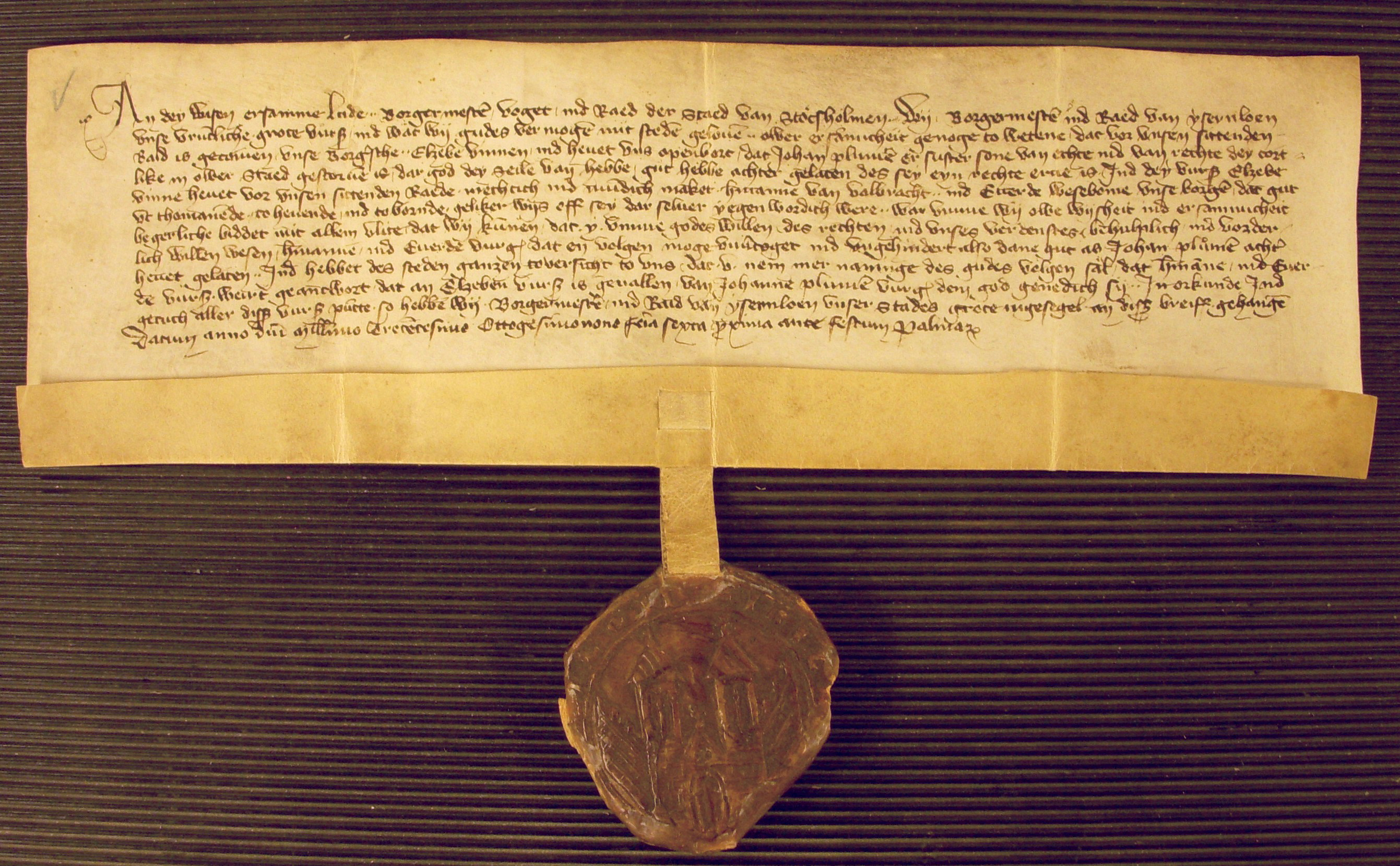
Document of 1389 on the election of the mayor of Stockholm

In Norway and Sweden the mayoral title borgermester/borgmästare has now been abolished. Norway abolished it in 1937 as a title of the non-political top manager of (city) municipalities and replaced it with the title rådmann ('alderman' or 'magistrate'), which is still in use when referring to the top managers of the municipalities of Norway. The top elected official of the municipalities of Norway, on the other hand, has the title ordfører, which actually means 'word-bearer', i.e. 'chairperson' or 'president', an equivalent to the Swedish word ordförande.

In Sweden borgmästare was a title of the senior judge of the courts of the cities, courts which were called rådhusrätt, literally 'town hall court', somewhat of an equivalent to an English magistrates' court. These courts were abolished in 1971. Until 1965, these mayor judges on historical grounds also performed some administrative functions in the board of magistrates, in Swedish known collectively as magistrat. Until 1965 there were also municipal mayors (kommunalborgmästare), who had these non-political administrative roles in smaller cities without a magistrates' court or magistrat. This office was an invention of the 20th century as the smaller cities in Sweden during the first half of the 20th century subsequently lost their own courts and magistrates.

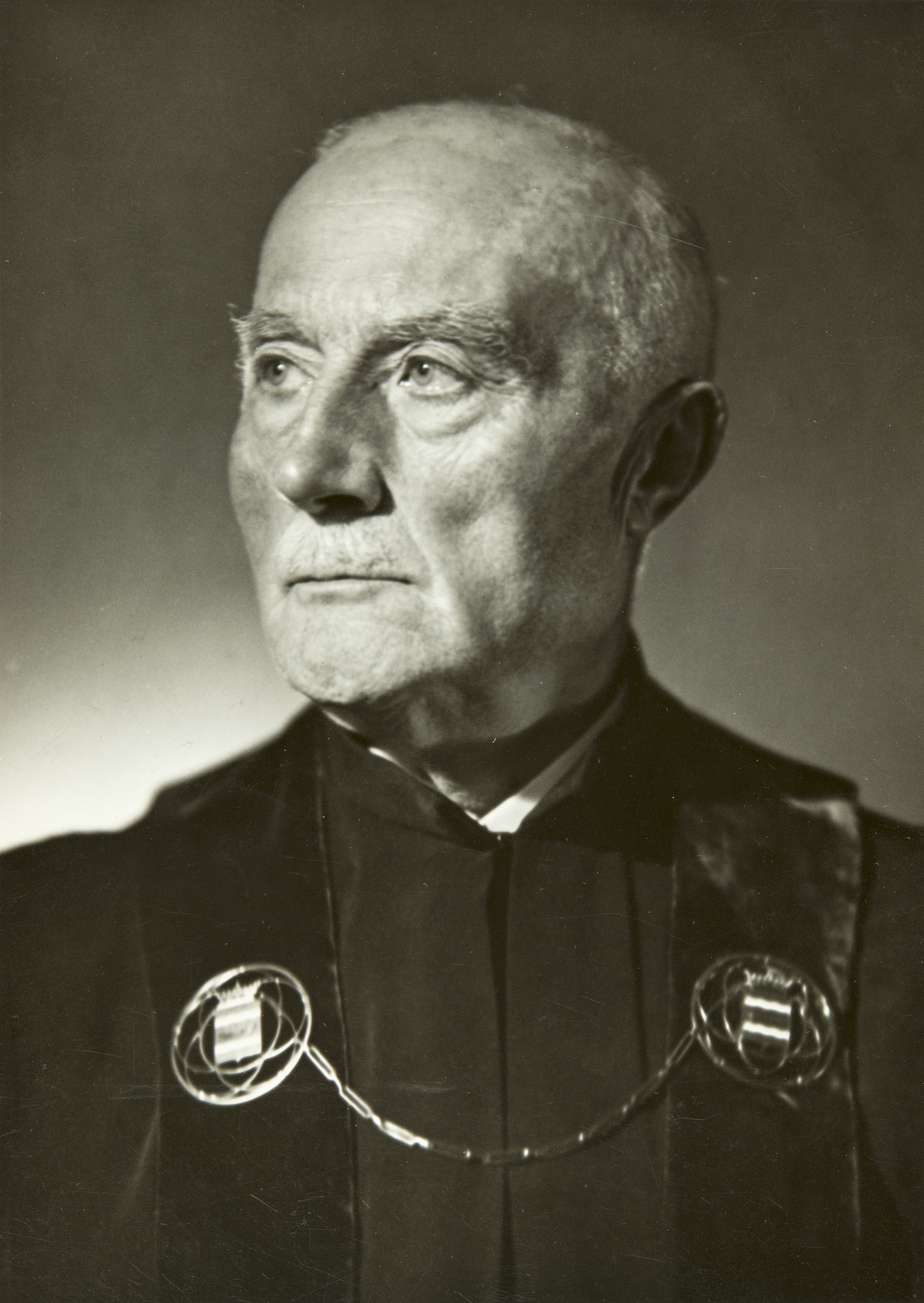
Arthur Castrén (1866–1946), the Mayor of Helsinki, in the 1930s

In the 16th century in Sweden, king Gustav Vasa considerably centralised government and appointed the mayors directly. In 1693 king Charles XI accepted a compromise after repeated petitions from the Estate of the Burgesses over decades against the royal mayor appointments. The compromise was that the burgesses in a city could normally nominate a mayor under the supervision of the local governor. The nominee was then to be presented to and appointed by the king, but the king could appoint mayors directly in exceptional cases. This was codified in the Instrument of Government of 1720 and on 8 July the same year Riksrådet ("the Council of the Realm") decided, after a petition from the said Estate, that only the city could present nominees, not the king or anyone else. Thus the supervision of the local governor and directly appointed mayors by the king ceased after 1720 (the so-called Age of Liberty). On 16 October 1723, it was decided after a petition that the city should present three nominees, of whom the king (or the Council of the Realm) appointed one. This was kept as a rule from then on in all later regulations and was also kept as a tradition in the 1809 Instrument of Government (§ 31) until 1965.

In Finland, there are two mayors, in Tampere and Pirkkala. Usually in Finland the highest executive official is not democratically elected, but is appointed to a public office by the city council, and is called simply kaupunginjohtaja 'city manager' or kunnanjohtaja 'municipal manager', depending on whether the municipality defines itself as a city. The term pormestari 'mayor', from Swedish borgmästare confusingly on historical grounds has referred to the highest official in the registry office and in the city courts (abolished in 1993) as in Sweden, not the city manager. In addition, pormestari is also an honorary title, which may be given for distinguished service in the post of the city manager. The city manager of Helsinki is called ylipormestari, which translates to 'chief mayor', for historical reasons. Furthermore, the term city manager may be seen translated as mayor.

==== Spain ====
The office of the alcalde evolved during the Reconquista as new lands were settled by the expanding kingdoms of León and Castile. As fortified settlements in the area between the Douro and Tagus rivers became true urban centers, they gained, from their feudal lords or the kings of Leon and Castile, the right to have councils. Among the rights that these councils had was to elect a municipal judge (iudex in Latin and juez in Spanish). These judges were assisted in their duties by various assistant judges, called alcaldes, whose number depended on the number of parishes the town had. The title alcalde was borrowed from the Arabic al-qaḍi (قاضي), meaning 'the judge'.

The word alcalde originally was used for simple judges, as in Andalusian Arabic. Only later was it applied to the presiding municipal magistrate. This early use continued to be reflected in its other uses, such as alcaldes del crimen, the judges in the audiencias; Alcaldes de la Casa y Corte de Su Majestad, who formed the highest tribunal in Castile and also managed the royal court; alcaldes mayores, a synonym for corregidor; and alcaldes de barrio, who were roughly the equivalent of British parish constables. Because of this, the municipal alcalde was often referred to as an alcalde ordinario.

== Mayors by country ==
=== Armenia ===
Mayors in Armenia are the head of the executive branch of municipal government. Mayors are often elected by the respective city council and serve for a five-year term. The mayor heads the community administration, nominates members of the administration to various posts, and oversees the municipal budget.

=== Australia ===
In Australian councils, the mayor is generally the member of the council who acts as a ceremonial figurehead at official functions, as well as carrying the authority of the council between meetings. Mayoral decisions made between meetings are subject to council and may be confirmed or repealed if necessary. Mayors in Australia may be elected either directly through a ballot for the position of mayor at a local-government election, or alternatively may be elected from within the council at a meeting.

The civic regalia and insignia of local government have basically remained unaltered for centuries. For ceremonial occasions a mayor may wear robes, a mayoral chain and a mace. Mayors have the title of His/Her Worship whilst holding the position.

In councils where councillors are elected representing political parties, the mayor is normally the leader of the party receiving the most seats on council. In Queensland, the lord mayor and mayors are elected by popular vote at the general council election.

=== Bangladesh ===
Mayors in Bangladesh are elected every five years. They are very powerful in municipal government. The mayor is the highest-ranking official in municipal governments in Bangladesh.

=== Brazil ===
Every municipality in Brazil elects a mayor (Portuguese: prefeito/prefeita) and a vice-mayor (Portuguese: vice-prefeito/vice-prefeita) for a four-year term, acting as an executive officer with the city council (Portuguese: Câmara Municipal) functioning with legislative powers. The mayor can be re-elected and manage the city for two consecutive terms.

Mayoral elections in Brazil occur in two different ways: in municipalities with more than 200,000 inhabitants, the voting happens in a two-round system, like the presidential and gubernatorial elections. In municipalities with less than 200,000 inhabitants, the voting happens in a relative majority system (with only one round).

The Brazilian system works similarly to the mayor-council government in the United States.

=== Canada ===
The chief executives of boroughs (arrondissements) in Quebec are termed mayors (maires/mairesses in French). A borough mayor simultaneously serves as head of the borough council and as a regular councillor on the main city council. The scheduling of municipal elections in Canada varies by jurisdiction, as each province and territory has its own laws regarding municipal governance.

As is the practice in most Commonwealth countries, in Canada a mayor is addressed as His/Her Worship while holding office.

==== Reeve ====
In a few municipalities and townships in Ontario, the reeve is the elected head of the municipality, and the second-in-command is referred to as the deputy reeve. Historically, in some small townships, the title reeve was used instead of mayor. In some other municipalities, mayor and reeve were two separate offices, with the mayor retaining leadership powers while the reeve was equivalent to what other municipalities called an at-large councillor. Today most municipalities in the province now designate their elected municipal government heads as mayors, but a small handful retain the position. This continues to be the case in the following municipalities and townships:

- Howick Township, Huron County
- North Huron Township, Huron County
- Beckwith Township, Lanark County
- Drummond/North Elmsley Township, Lanark County
- Lanark Highlands, Lanark County
- Montague Township, Lanark County
- Tay Valley Township, Lanark County
- Township of The Archipelago, Parry Sound District
- Alberton Township, Rainy River District
- Chapple Township, Rainy River District
- La Vallee Township, Rainy River District
- Morley Township, Rainy River District
- Dorion Township, Thunder Bay District
- Gilles Township, Thunder Bay District
- Brethour Township, Timiskaming District
- Casey Township, Timiskaming District
- Chamberlain Township, Timiskaming District
- Municipality of Charlton and Dack, Timiskaming District
- Evaturel Township, Timiskaming District
- Gauthier Township, Timiskaming District
- Harley Township, Timiskaming District
- Harris Township, Timiskaming District
- Hilliard Township, Timiskaming District
- Hudson Township, Timiskaming District
- James Township, Timiskaming District
- Kerns Township, Timiskaming District
- Village of Thornloe, Timiskaming District

The reeve is also the chief elected official in most of Alberta's municipal districts.

The elected heads of rural municipalities (RM) in the provinces of Manitoba and Saskatchewan are usually referred to as a reeve.

=== Cook Islands ===
There are currently 10 mayors in the Cook Islands. The country's main population centre, the island of Rarotonga, does not have any local government and thus has no mayors; the country's uninhabited islands also don't have mayors.

=== Dominican Republic ===
The mayor of a municipality in the Dominican Republic is called indistinctly alcalde or síndico. The latter name is preferred to avoid confusing the title with the similar-sounding alcaide (lit. 'prison warden'). Such a person is the governor of the municipality whose township elected him (or her) by direct vote for a term of four years. The daily duties of the mayor's office are restricted to local governance, and as such, it is responsible for the coordination of waste collection, upkeep of public spaces (e.g., parks, undeveloped urban parcels, streets), traffic light control, sewage, and most public utilities. In practice, most of its duties are centered on minor street repairs (new or large road projects, like overpasses, bridges, pedestrian crossings, etc. are handled by the Ministry of Public Works (Spanish: Ministerio de Obras Públicas), under the direct control of the central government. Subcontracting garbage collection and management, overseeing the use of public spaces, and arbitrating neighborhood land use disputes, which are managed by the National Property office (Spanish: Oficina de Bienes Nacionales), is also controlled by the mayor's office. Water, electrical supply and public transportation coordination are handled by several central government offices, and as such, are not under the control of the mayor.

=== France ===
Mayors (maires) are elected for a six-year term by the municipal council, whose members are elected by direct universal suffrage in local elections held every six years.

=== Germany ===
In Germany, local government is regulated by state statutes. Nowadays only the mayors of the three city-states (Berlin, Hamburg and Bremen) are still elected by the respective city-state parliaments. In all the other states the mayors are now elected directly by the EU citizens living in that area. The post of mayor may be said to be a professional one, the mayor being the head of the local government, and requiring, to be eligible, training in administration. In big cities (details are regulated by state statutes) the official title is Oberbürgermeister (mayor). In these cities, a "simple" mayor is just a deputy responsible for a distinct task (e.g., welfare or construction works). Big cities are usually kreisfrei ('district-free'). That means that the city council also has the powers and duties of a rural district council. The leader of a rural district council is called Landrat ('land counsellor'). In that case, the chief mayor also has the duties and powers of a Landrat.

There are also some German states that allow smaller cities to have an Oberbürgermeister as well. In Saarland, for instance, every city with more than 35,000 inhabitants has one, and in Saxony-Anhalt every city with a population bigger than 25,000 has one. The term Oberbürgermeister is not used in the three city-states, where the mayors are simultaneously head of state governments, but Regierender Bürgermeister (Governing Mayor of Berlin), Erster Bürgermeister (First Mayor of the city-state of Hamburg) and Präsident des Senats und Bürgermeister (President of the Senate and Mayor of Bremen) are used. However, the term Oberbürgermeister was used for the head of the state government of West Berlin until 1951 and was also used in East Berlin from 1948 to January 1991.

=== Greece ===
Mayors (δήμαρχοι, dēmarchoi, sing. δήμαρχος, dēmarchos) in Greece were previously elected every four years in local elections and are the head of various municipal governments in which the state is divided. Starting in 2014, mayors are elected for a five-year term. Local administration elections for the new, consolidated municipalities and peripheries will henceforth be held together with the elections for the European Parliament.

Local administration in Greece recently underwent extensive reform in two phases: the first phase, implemented in 1997 and commonly called the Kapodistrias Plan, consolidated the country's numerous municipalities and communities down to approximately 1000. The second phase, initially called Kapodistrias II but eventually called the Kallikratis Plan, was implemented in 2010, further consolidated municipalities down to 370, and merged the country's 54 prefectures, which were disbanded in favour of the larger 13 regions. The Kallikratian municipalities were designed according to several guidelines; for example, each island (except Crete) was incorporated into a single municipality, while the majority of small towns were consolidated so as to have an average municipal population of 25,000.

=== India ===
In India, the mayor is the first citizen of a city and the head of municipal corporation which is a local government of cities with a population over one million. They have a number of roles, both ceremonial and functional. In most Indian states mayors are elected indirectly among the corporators (who are directly elected by the people of their respective wards) of the municipal corporation, except in nine states: Bihar, Chhattisgarh, Haryana, Jharkhand, Madhya Pradesh, Odisha, Uttar Pradesh, Telangana and Uttarakhand, where mayors are elected directly by the public.

=== Indonesia ===
In Indonesia, mayor (Indonesian: wali kota, formerly called walikotamadya and walikota) is a regional head of a city or town. A mayor has the same level as a regent (bupati), head of a regency (kabupaten). A mayor has the duty and authority to lead the implementation of the policies established by the region along with the city council (Dewan Perwakilan Rakyat Daerah Kota, DPRD Kota; formerly called Tier 2-DPRD (DPRD Tingkat II)). A mayor is elected in a pair with a vice mayor through direct elections and is a political office. An exception is Special Capital Region of Jakarta, where mayoralty is a civil-service career position with limited authority and is designated by the governor. Their regions are called administration cities (kota administrasi).

Before 1999, there were administrative cities (kota administratif, [id]) which were headed by administrative mayors.

=== Ireland ===
In the Republic of Ireland, the head of a borough corporation was called "mayor" from the Municipal Corporations (Ireland) Act 1840 until boroughs were abolished by the Local Government Reform Act 2014. City council chairs are "mayor" (or "lord mayor" in the cases of Dublin and of Cork). The Local Government Act 2001 allowed county councils to style their chairperson as "mayor" and some do so. Since 2000 there have been proposals for a directly elected mayor of the Dublin Metropolitan Area. The 2019 local elections included plebiscites in three areas on directly elected mayors, of which that for Mayor of Limerick was passed, with the first direct election due as part of the 2024 local elections.

=== Iran ===
In Iran, the mayor is the executive manager of a city and is elected by the Islamic city council. The mayor is elected for a four-year term

=== Italy ===
In Italy, the mayor is called sindaco, or informally primo cittadino ('first citizen'). Every municipality (Italian: comune) has a mayor who represents the local government. The mayor is directly elected every five years by the inhabitants of the comune; the mayor cannot serve for more than two consecutive terms, except in municipalities of up to 5,000 inhabitants, those having a three consecutive terms limit.

The mayor is a member of the city council, the legislative body which checks the mayor's policy guidelines and is able to enforce his resignation by a motion of no confidence, and is entitled to appoint and release the members of the executive body (Italian: giunta).

=== Japan ===
Japan's Local-Autonomy Law of 1947 defines the structure of Japanese local governments, which were strengthened after World War II. It gives strong executive power to the mayor in local politics like strong mayors in large cities in the United States of America. The titles that are translated as mayor by the governments are those of the heads of cities shichō (市長), towns chōchō (町長), villages sonchō (村長), and Tokyo's special wards kuchō (区長) (The head of the Tokyo prefecture is the governor (知事, Chiji)).

A mayor is elected every four years by direct popular votes held separately from the assembly. A mayor can be recalled by a popular initiative but the prefectural and the national governments cannot remove a mayor from office. Towards the assembly the mayor prepares budgets, proposes local acts and may veto local acts approved by the assembly which can be overridden by two-thirds assembly support. A mayor can dissolve the assembly if the assembly passes a motion of no confidence or if the mayor thinks the assembly has no confidence in fact.

=== Kazakhstan ===
In Kazakhstan, the mayor is called akim, who is the head of an akimat, a municipal, district, or provincial government (mayorat), and serves as the presidential representative. Akims of provinces and cities are appointed to the post by the president on the advice of the prime minister. Meanwhile, the akims of other administrative and territorial units are appointed or elected to the post in an order defined by the president. The president may also dismiss akims from their posts. The akims' powers end upon the newly elected president of the republic taking office. Thus, the akims continue to fulfill their duties before the appointment of the corresponding akim by the President of Kazakhstan.

=== Malaysia ===
The mayor functions as the head of the local government of the cities in Malaysia. To date, there are 14 officially-recognised cities in the country.

In cities which lie within the jurisdiction of any one of the 13 Malaysian states, the mayor is appointed by the state government. Kuala Lumpur, the country's capital, is a notable exception, as it forms part of the Federal Territories which come under the purview of the Malaysian federal government, via the Ministry of Federal Territories. Thus, the mayor of Kuala Lumpur is selected by, and subordinate to, the Minister of Federal Territories.

Following the 2018 general election, which saw the country undergoing its first ever regime change, there have been calls to revive local government elections, which had been the practice in certain cities such as Kuala Lumpur, George Town, Ipoh and Melaka until their abolishment in 1965. The reinstatement of local government elections would lead to the mayoral position being elected, instead of being appointed as per the current system.

=== Malta ===
In Malta, the mayor (Maltese: sindku) is the leader of the majority party in the local council. The members of the local councils are directly elected and collectively serve as a basic form of local government.

=== Moldova ===
The mayor of the municipality in Moldova is elected for four years. In Chișinău, the last mayoral elections had to be repeated three times because of the low rate of participation.

=== Nepal ===
Mayors in Nepal are elected every five years in the local elections. They are very powerful in municipal government. The mayor is the highest-ranking official in a municipal government in Nepal.

=== Netherlands ===
In the Netherlands, the mayor (Dutch: burgemeester) is the leader of the college of mayor and aldermen (college van burgemeester en wethouders), the municipal executive. In the Netherlands, burgemeesters are de facto appointed by the national cabinet, de jure by the monarch. Appointment is generally preceded by a selection procedure and nomination by the municipal council and king's commissioner (head of the provincial executive), and a nomination is only very rarely not followed by an appointment. Mayors preside over both the municipal executive and the legislative (gemeenteraad), although they can vote in the former and not in the latter. The title is sometimes translated as burgomaster, to emphasise the appointed, rather than elected, nature of the office.

The appointment procedure was brought for discussion in the early 2000s (decade), as some of the political parties represented in parliament regarded the procedure as undemocratic. Generally, mayors in the Netherlands are selected from the established political parties, although since the late 2010s mayors without political affiliation have become more common. Alternatives proposed were direct election of the mayor by the people or official appointment by the municipal council (gemeenteraad). A constitutional change to allow for this failed to pass the Senate in March 2005, but succeeded in 2018.

=== New Zealand ===
Mayors are the directly elected leaders of New Zealand's territorial authorities. They chair local council meetings and have limited executive powers, including the ability to appoint a deputy mayor, establish committees, and select chairpersons for said committees. Their constitutional role, as laid out in the Local Government Act 2002, is to provide leadership to their councillors and citizens of their districts, and to guide the direction of council plans and policies. Mayors are elected using either the first-past-the-post or single transferable vote system.

=== Pakistan ===
In Pakistan, a city is headed by the district nazim (the word means 'administrator' in Urdu, but is sometimes translated as 'mayor') and assisted by the naib nazim, who is also speaker of the district council. The district nazim is elected by the nazims of union councils, union councillors and by tehsil nazims, who themselves are elected directly by the votes of the local public. Council elections are held every four years.

=== Philippines ===
In the Philippines, mayors (Tagalog: punong bayan / punong lungsod / alkalde) are the head of a municipality or a city, with the vice mayor as the second-highest position in the city. They are elected every three years during the midterm and national elections, and they can serve up to three consecutive terms of office. as Female Mayors called Mayora. As of September 2012, there are 1,635 mayors in the Philippines.

=== Poland ===
As of 30 April 2022, there are altogether 2477 municipalities (gmina) in Poland, including 1513 rural gminas, while the remaining 968 ones contain cities and towns. Among them, 666 towns are part of an urban-rural gmina while 302 cities and towns are standalone as an urban gmina. The latter group includes 107 cities (governed by a prezydent miasta), including 66 cities with powiat rights. 37 cities among the latter group are over 100,000, including 18 cities serving as a seat for voivode or voivodeship sejmik, informally called voivodeship cities.

All municipalities in Poland including cities and towns are governed under the mandatory mayor–council government system. Executive power is vested in an official called one of the following:

- a city mayor (prezydent miasta)
- a town mayor (burmistrz)
- a wójt which is the equivalent office in a rural municipality (gmina wiejska)

They are elected by a two-round direct election for a five-year term concurrently with the five-year term of the municipal council and cannot serve in the latter or in any higher-level deliberative bodies: a county council, a voivodeship sejmik, the Parliament of Poland or the European Parliament. Citizens with a criminal record cannot run for mayor, but only if sentenced for intentional criminal offence prosecuted ex officio. The municipal/town/city council is the legislative, budget-making and oversight body. Mayor is obliged to appoint his deputy. A town or city mayor may be scrutinized or denied funding for his/her projects by the council, but is not politically responsible to it and does not require its confidence to remain in office; therefore, cohabitation is not uncommon. A recall referendum may however be triggered through a petition supported by at least 1/10 of eligible voters, but the turnout in the recall referendum must be at least 3/5 of the number of people voting in the original election for the referendum to be valid and binding. A town/city mayor can also be dismissed by the prime minister in case of persistent transgression of the law.

Town/city mayors manage the municipal estate, issue administrative decisions and minor regulations, and incur liabilities within limits set by the municipal council. They prepare and present the planned budget to the municipal council, subject to its acceptation and amendments. After the municipal council votes to accept the budget, the town/city mayor is responsible for its realization. Town/city mayors are heads of the town/city hall (office), the register office (the town/city mayor may appoint deputies for these specific tasks), as well as the parent authority for all public kindergartens and elementary schools in the municipality. They are also personally responsible for the emergency management and civil defense in a municipality. A municipality itself is responsible among others for public transport, water supply and treatment, and waste management. A town/city mayor has the legal capacity to act as employer for all the officials of a town/city hall. Town/city mayors in Poland have wide administrative and staffing authority: the only municipal executive official that the town/city mayor cannot appoint or dismiss is a city treasurer, who is appointed by the town/city council. Although they do not have in Poland power to veto city council resolutions, their position is relatively strong and should be classified as a mayor-council government.In a city with powiat rights, the city mayor also has the powers and duties of a powiat executive board and a starosta.

In addition, an office of quarter mayor (burmistrz dzielnicy) exists in the auxiliary units of the city of Warsaw, called quarters. In spite of remaining an integral part of the city as an entity, the quarters have a degree of autonomy legally guaranteed through a form of an own local self-government exercising some powers devolved by law from the city. Each of the 18 city quarters has an own council (rada dzielnicy) which elects an executive board (zarząd dzielnicy) headed by a quarter mayor (burmistrz dzielnicy), the latter elected by the council among several candidates nominated by the city mayor of Warsaw among the council's members, as opposed to a town or a city mayor, both elected under direct suffrage.

=== Portugal ===
In Portugal and many other Portuguese-speaking countries the mayor of a municipality is called the Presidente da Câmara Municipal ('President of the Municipal Chamber').

=== Romania ===
In Romania, the mayor of a commune, town or city is called primar. The primar is elected for a period of four years. In carrying out their responsibilities they are assisted by an elected local council (consiliu local). Bucharest has a general mayor (primar general) and six sector mayors (primar de sector), one for each sector. The responsibilities of the mayor and of the local council are defined by Law 215/2001 of the Romanian Parliament.

=== Russia ===
In Russia, the Мэр, from French maire (transliteration: mer – not to be confused with the NATO OF-3 rank Майор – English: major), is one of the possible titles of the head of the administration of a city or municipality. This title is equivalent to that of the head of a Russian rural district. Exceptionally, the mer of Moscow, Saint-Petersburg and Sevastopol are equivalent to governors in Russia, since these three federal cities are Russian federal subjects.

Except for the aforementioned three large cities, the governance system of a Russian municipality (city, county, district or town) is subordinate to the representative council of the federation in which it is located. The mer is either directly elected in municipal elections (citywide referendum) or is elected by the members of the municipality's representative council. Election by council members is now more widespread because it better integrates with the Russian federal three-level vertical governance structure:

1. National government:
  1. President (executive)
  2. Federal Assembly
2. Federation governments:
  1. Heads of federation (commonly governors)
  2. Regional representative councils
3. Local governments:
  1. Heads of administration (who have the official title of mer, whether or not local law defines it as such)
  2. Local representative councils

The typical term of office of a mer in Russia is four years. The mer's office administers all municipal services, public property, police and fire protection, and most public agencies, and enforces all local and state laws within a city or town.

According to Medialogy, the mer of Novosibirsk, Anatoly Lokot', is mentioned in the media more than any other Russian mayor. The mer of Kazan, Il'sur Metshin, is the most popular in Russia, scoring 76 out of 100, according to the Russian People's Rating of Mers.

The status of the post in Sevastopol is not legally recognized outside of the Russian Federation.

=== Serbia ===
In Serbia, the mayor is the head of the city or a town. The mayor acts on behalf of the city, and performs an executive function. The position of the mayor of Belgrade is important as the capital city is the most important hub of economics, culture and science in Serbia. Furthermore, the post of the mayor of Belgrade is the third most important position in the government after the prime minister and president. The Local Administration Act of 2007 establishes a mayor-council system for all municipalities, except city municipalities that are part of a city. The title of the mayor varies: the formal title of municipality heads is the President of Municipality (Serbian: председник општине, romanized: predsednik opštine) while cities are headed by mayors (Serbian: градоначелник, romanized: gradonačelnik); both are, however, called gradonačelnik in everyday parlance. The mayor is elected indirectly by the city council for a term of 4 years, without a term limit; previously, from 1990 to 2006 mayors were elected directly by voters in local elections alongside the municipal council.

=== Spain and Hispanic America ===
Alcalde is the most common Spanish term for the mayor of a town or city. It is derived from the Arabic: al-qaḍi (قاضي), i.e., 'the (Sharia) judge', who often had administrative, as well as judicial, functions. Although the Castilian alcalde and the Andalusian qaḍi had slightly different attributes (the qaḍi oversaw an entire province, the alcalde only a municipality; the former was appointed by the ruler of the state but the latter was elected by the municipal council), the adoption of this term reflects how much Muslim society in the Iberian Peninsula influenced the Christian one in the early phases of the Reconquista. As Spanish Christians took over an increasing part of the Peninsula, they adapted the Muslim systems and terminology for their own use.

Today, it refers to the executive head of a municipal or local government, who usually does not have judicial functions. The word intendente is used in Argentina and Paraguay for the office that is analogous to a mayor.

In municipios and larger cities in Mexico, the chief executive is known as both alcalde or as presidente municipal ('municipal president'), with the latter being more widely used.

=== Sweden ===
The Swedish title borgmästare (burgomaster) was abolished in the court reform of 1971 when also the towns of Sweden were officially abolished.

=== Switzerland ===
The function and title for mayor vary from one canton to another. Generally, the mayor presides over an executive council of several members governing a municipality.

The title is:

- In Italian: sindaco (Ticino), podestà (Grigioni)
- In French: maire (Geneva, Jura, Bern), syndic (Vaud, Fribourg), président du conseil municipal (Valais), président du conseil communal (Neuchâtel)
- In German: e.g. Stadtpräsident, Stadtammann, Gemeindepräsident, Gemeindeammann

=== Taiwan ===
In Taiwan, mayors are the head of governments in cities and townships.

=== Turkey ===
Mayors (Turkish: belediye başkanı) in Turkey are elected by popular vote for five years alongside the municipal council. As a rule, there are municipalities in all province centers and district centers as well as towns (Turkish: belde) which are actually villages with a population in excess of 2000. However, beginning by 1983, a new level of municipality was introduced in the Turkish administrative system. In big cities, metropolitan municipalities (Turkish: Büyükşehir belediyesi) are established. (See metropolitan municipalities in Turkey) In a metropolitan municipality there may be several district municipalities (hence mayors). Mayors are elected in local elections.

=== Ukraine ===
In Ukraine the title "head of the city" (Ukrainian: міський голова, romanized: misky holova; unofficially the foreign adaptation Ukrainian: мер, romanized: mer also is present) was introduced in 1999. Since then, the post is elected by all residents of the city. Before that date, the post was elected by members of the city council only and was known as head of the city council, which ex officio also serves as the head of the executive committee. For the cities that carry special status such as Kyiv and Sevastopol (currently occupied by Russia), the head of the city was a matter of long debate and the post is regulated by special laws.

Since 2015 a post of Ukrainian: староста, romanized: starosta ('elder') has been implemented at the lower level of the administrative-territorial pyramid. Candidates to the post are also elected by members of the territorial community (Ukrainian: громада, romanized: hromada). The post is historical and existed in the territory of Ukraine during the times of the Polish–Lithuanian Commonwealth.

=== United States ===
The mayor is the municipal head of government, the maximum civil authority at the municipal level, in most United States municipalities (such as cities, townships, etc.). In the United States, there are several distinct types of mayors, depending on whether the system of local government is council-manager government or mayor-council government.

Under the council-manager government system, the mayor is a first among equals on the city council, which acts as a legislative body while executive functions are performed by the appointed manager. The mayor may chair the city council, but lacks any special legislative powers. The mayor and city council serve part-time, with day-to-day administration in the hands of a professional city manager. The system is most common among medium-sized cities from around 25,000 to several hundred thousand, usually rural and suburban municipalities.

Under the mayor-council system, the mayoralty and city council are separate offices. This system may be of two types, either a strong mayor system or a weak mayor system. Under the strong mayor system, the mayor acts as an elected executive with the city council exercising legislative powers. They may select a chief administrative officer to oversee the different departments. This is the system used in most of the United States' large cities, primarily because mayors serve full-time and have a wide range of services that they oversee. In a weak mayor or ceremonial mayor system, the mayor has appointing power for department heads but is subject to checks by the city council, sharing both executive and legislative duties with the council. This is common for smaller cities, especially in New England. Charlotte, North Carolina is a large American city with a ceremonial mayor.

Many American mayors are styled "His Honor" or "Her Honor" while in office.

A 2014 analysis found no difference in performance between male and female mayors in the United States, and no evidence of a positive role model effect from female mayors inspiring future candidates. In 2016 author Mirya R. Holman wrote that female mayors "emphasize nurturer parent frames more frequently whereas male mayors emphasize strict father frames, but they discuss economic development at very similar levels".

=== Uruguay ===
Uruguay has a first-level administrative division, the 19 Departments. Since 1908 they were headed by the Intendente Municipal, which covered the functions of Intendancy and municipal government at the same time.

On 13 September 2009 the Law No. 18567 created a second-level administrative division, the Municipio, headed by an alcalde. Further, the Law No. 19272 of 18 September 2014 established the regulation provided that in settlements with more than 2,000 inhabitants a municipality was to be created including their surrounding territories, as long as it consisted in a social and cultural unit with their own common interests, that justified the creation of this kind of political entity. Settlements with less than 2,000 inhabitants were allowed to establish a municipality if the Departmental Board voted for it after the Intendant proposal, or by popular initiative of at least the 15% of voters in the settlement. Municipalities in departmental seats were only allowed to be created by Departmental Boards after the Intendant's proposal.

Further, the current system renamed the first-level administrative head as Intendente Departamental.

There is an ongoing debate regarding this municipios system, due to the high cost and low quality of public services, ambiguous mandates for citizen participation, and inefficient bureaucracy. Critics highlight, particularly in Montevideo, issues like slow responses to local infrastructure needs, excessive personnel, and a lack of effective horizontal coordination between different municipal jurisdictions.

== Multi-tier local government ==
In several countries, where there is no local autonomy, mayors are often appointed by some branch of the national or regional government. In some cities, subdivisions such as boroughs may have their own mayors; this is the case, for example, with the arrondissements of Paris, Montreal, and Mexico City. In Belgium, Brussels is administratively one of the federation's three regions, and is subdivided, without the other regions' provincial level, into 19 rather small municipalities, with one, the City of Brussels, being the kingdom's capital, which each have an elected—formally appointed—burgomaster (i.e., mayor, responsible to his/her elected council); while Antwerp, the other major metropolitan area, has one large city (where the boroughs, former municipalities merged into it, elect a lower level, albeit with very limited competence) and several smaller surrounding municipalities, each under a normal burgomaster as in Brussels.

In the People's Republic of China, the mayor (市长) may be the administrative head of any municipality, provincial, prefecture-level, or county-level. The mayor is usually the most recognized official in cities, although the position is the second-highest-ranking official in charge after the local Communist Party secretary. In principle, the mayor (who also serves as the deputy Communist Party secretary of the city) is responsible for managing the city administration while the Communist Party secretary is responsible for general policy and managing the party bureaucracy, but in practice the roles blur, frequently causing conflict.

== Acting mayor ==
Acting mayor is a temporary office created by the charter of some municipal governments.

In many cities and towns, the charter or some similar fundamental document provides that in the event of the death, illness, resignation, or removal from office of the incumbent mayor, another official will lead the municipality for a temporary period, which, depending on the jurisdiction, may be for a stated period of days or months until a special election can be held, or until the original end of the term to which the vacating mayor was elected.

Some cities may also provide for a deputy mayor to be temporarily designated as "acting mayor" in the event that the incumbent mayor is temporarily unavailable, such as for health reasons or out-of-town travel, but still continues to hold the position and is expected to return to the duties of the office. In this latter capacity, the acting mayor's role is to ensure that city government business can continue in the regular mayor's absence, and the acting mayor is not deemed to have actually held the office of mayor. In some jurisdictions, however, when a mayor resigns or dies in office, the mayor's successor is not considered to be an acting mayor but rather fully mayor in their own right.

The position of acting mayor is usually of considerably more importance in a mayor-council form of municipal government, where the mayor performs functions of day-to-day leadership, than it is in a council-manager or committee system forms of government, where the city manager or the local council's committees respectively provide day-to-day leadership and the position of mayor is either a largely or entirely ceremonial one.

== See also ==
- Lists of mayors by country
- Deputy mayor
- Governor

=== Concepts ===
- Acting (law)
- Burgomaster
- Sarpanch
- World Mayor

=== Local government ===
- Seat of government
- Council–manager government
- Mayor–council government

=== Historical ===
- Schultheiß
- Praefectus urbi
