= List of municipal commissioners for finance of Stockholm =

This is a list of municipal commissioners for finance of Stockholm (finansborgarråd).

The office of municipal commissioner for finance was set up in 1920. While the mayor (borgmästare) before 1920 was appointed by the government, the municipal commissioner for finance is elected by the Stockholm city council. After a reform in 1940, the municipal commissioner for finance always represents the ruling political majority coalition in the city. From 1994 the municipal commissioner for finance is also chairman of the municipal board (kommunstyrelsen), a title often called mayor in English.

== Occupants from 1920 till now ==
| Name | Image | Term | Political Party |
|---|---|---|---|
| Carl Juhlin-Dannfelt | | 1920–1926 | Conservative |
| Gustaf Söderlund | | 1926–1931 | Conservative |
| Knut G. Ewerlöf | | 1931–1936 | Conservative |
| Halvar Sundberg | | 1936–1940 | Conservative |
| Zeth Höglund | | 1940–1950 | Social Democrat |
| John Bergvall | | 1950–1954 | Liberal |
| Erik Huss | | 1954–1958 | Liberal |
| Hjalmar Mehr | | 1958–1966 | Social Democrat |
| Per-Olof Hansson | | 1966–1970 | Liberal |
| Albert Aronsson | | 1971–1973 | Social Democrat |
| John-Olof Persson | | 1973–1976 | Social Democrat |
| Ulf Adelsohn | | 1976–1979 | Moderate |
| John-Olof Persson | | 1979–1986 | Social Democrat |
| Sture Palmgren | | 1986–1988 | Moderate |
| Mats Hulth | | 1988–1991 | Social Democrat |
| Carl Cederschiöld | | 1991–1994 | Moderate |
| Mats Hulth | | 1994–1998 | Social Democrat |
| Carl Cederschiöld | | 1998–2002 | Moderate |
| Annika Billström | | 2002–2006 | Social Democrat |
| Kristina Axén Olin | | 2006–2008 | Moderate |
| Sten Nordin | | 2008–2014 | Moderate |
| Karin Wanngård | | 2014–2018 | Social Democrat |
| Anna König Jerlmyr | | 2018–2022 | Moderate |
| Karin Wanngård | | 2022– | Social Democrat |

== See also ==
- sv:Stockholms författningsreform 1940
