= List of Swedish county governors =

These are lists of Swedish county governors.

- List of governors of Älvsborg County
- List of governors of Blekinge County
- List of governors of Dalarna County
- List of governors of Gävleborg County
- List of governors of Gothenburg and Bohus County
- List of governors of Gotland County
- List of governors of Halland County
- List of governors of Jämtland County
- List of governors of Jönköping County
- List of governors of Kalmar County
- List of governors of Kristianstad County
- List of governors of Kronoberg County
- List of governors of Malmöhus County
- List of governors of Norrbotten County
- List of governors of Örebro County
- List of governors of Östergötland County
- List of governors of Skåne County
- List of governors of Skaraborg County
- List of governors of Södermanland County
- List of governors of Stockholm County
- List of governors of Uppsala County
- List of governors of Värmland County
- List of governors of Västerbotten County
- List of governors of Västernorrland County
- List of governors of Västmanland County
- List of governors of Västra Götaland County
