= Results of the 1940 Swedish general election =

Sweden held a general election on 15 September 1940.

== Results ==
Party	Votes	%	Seats	+/–
Swedish Social Democratic Party	1,546,804	53.81	134	+22
National Organisation of the Right	518,346	18.03	42	–2
Farmers' League	344,345	11.98	28	–8
People's Party	344,113	11.97	23	–4
Communist Party	101,424	3.53	3	–2
Socialist Party	18,430	0.64	0	–6
Left Socialist Party	898	0.03	0	New
Other parties	57	0.00	0	0
Total	2,874,417	100.00	230	0
Valid votes	2,874,417	99.49		
Invalid/blank votes	14,720	0.51		
Total votes	2,889,137	100.00		
Registered voters/turnout	4,110,720	70.28		
Source: Nohlen & Stöver, SCB

== Regional results ==
Due to the Socialist Party losing its Riksdag representation, only the Social Democrats and the Communist Party have been counted towards the leftist bloc.

=== Percentage share ===
Location	Share	Votes	S	AV	B	FP	K	SP	Other	Left	Right
Götaland	50.2	1,443,191	51.2	19.7	15.4	10.8	2.8	0.1	0.1	54.0	45.8
Svealand	34.6	995,346	56.8	17.5	7.4	13.4	3.5	1.4	0.0	60.3	38.3
Norrland	15.2	435,880	55.5	13.9	11.0	12.7	6.1	0.8	0.0	61.6	37.6
Total	100.0	2,874,417	53.8	18.0	12.0	12.0	3.5	0.6	0.0	57.3	42.0
Source: SCB

=== By votes ===
Location	Share	Votes	S	AV	B	FP	K	SP	Other	Left	Right
Götaland	50.2	1,443,191	739,363	283,618	222,559	155,523	40,195	1,019	914	779,558	661,700
Svealand	34.6	995,346	565,494	174,221	73,690	133,317	34,460	14,138	26	599,954	381,228
Norrland	15.2	435,880	241,947	60,507	48,096	55,273	26,769	3,273	15	268,716	163,876
Total	100.0	2,874,417	1,546,804	518,346	344,345	344,113	101,424	18,430	955	1,648,228	1,206,804
Source: SCB

== Constituency results ==
=== Percentage share ===
Location	Land	Share	Votes	S	H	B	FP	K	SP	Other	Left	Right	Margin
Location		%		%	%	%	%	%	%	%	%	%	
Blekinge	G	2.0	56,910	54.8	19.9	11.1	12.3	1.9	0.0	0.0	56.7	43.3	7,620
Bohuslän	G	3.1	89,004	48.6	20.9	11.6	15.5	3.4	0.0	0.0	51.9	48.1	3,454
Gothenburg	G	5.0	143,560	52.4	22.0	0.0	11.2	13.3	0.4	0.6	65.7	33.2	46,696
Gotland	G	0.9	24,766	36.6	18.2	30.6	14.1	0.5	0.0	0.0	37.1	62.9	6,372
Gävleborg	N	4.0	114,081	60.3	8.8	12.3	10.8	4.9	2.9	0.0	65.2	32.0	37,864
Halland	G	2.5	70,897	42.6	19.5	31.8	3.9	2.3	0.0	0.0	44.8	55.2	7,304
Jämtland	N	1.8	51,583	56.8	17.4	14.0	10.3	1.5	0.0	0.0	58.3	41.7	8,599
Jönköping	G	4.1	117,682	45.2	13.3	18.9	20.4	2.2	0.0	0.0	47.4	52.6	6,171
Kalmar	G	3.5	99,845	48.0	22.1	22.7	5.4	1.8	0.0	0.0	49.8	50.2	435
Kopparberg	S	3.7	105,874	60.8	9.2	11.2	15.0	1.9	1.9	0.0	62.7	35.4	28,887
Kristianstad	G	3.7	107,726	50.2	15.9	20.0	15.0	0.8	0.0	0.0	51.0	49.0	2,149
Kronoberg	G	2.3	65,756	44.1	22.5	24.8	5.6	3.1	0.0	0.0	47.2	52.8	3,736
Malmö area	G	4.8	138,890	67.4	23.7	0.6	7.3	1.1	0.0	0.0	68.4	31.6	51,200
Malmöhus	G	4.5	130,195	56.9	13.4	22.1	7.7	0.0	0.0	0.0	56.9	43.1	17,946
Norrbotten	N	2.5	70,585	50.9	18.1	7.9	5.5	17.7	0.0	0.0	68.6	31.4	26,197
Skaraborg	G	3.7	104,926	41.3	22.1	21.1	14.0	1.4	0.0	0.0	42.7	57.3	15,316
Stockholm	S	10.8	309,331	52.0	27.1	0.0	13.3	5.8	1.8	0.0	57.7	40.4	53,527
Stockholm County	S	4.6	131,083	56.2	18.2	6.8	13.2	3.3	2.3	0.0	59.5	38.2	27,942
Södermanland	S	3.2	92,733	62.1	12.5	11.3	12.4	0.8	0.9	0.0	62.9	36.2	24,798
Uppsala	S	2.2	61,900	54.5	15.6	14.4	14.3	1.1	0.0	0.0	55.6	44.4	6,934
Värmland	S	4.1	117,442	58.6	12.3	11.1	13.2	3.7	1.2	0.0	62.3	36.5	30,347
Västerbotten	N	2.9	83,036	45.9	18.2	8.5	26.1	1.3	0.0	0.0	47.2	52.8	4,679
Västernorrland	N	4.1	116,595	59.9	11.6	12.2	10.4	5.9	0.0	0.0	65.8	34.2	36,859
Västmanland	S	2.7	76,853	61.1	11.1	14.1	10.8	2.9	0.0	0.0	64.0	36.0	21,521
Älvsborg N	G	2.6	75,664	48.6	16.3	18.9	14.6	1.5	0.0	0.0	50.1	49.9	150
Älvsborg S	G	2.3	67,040	43.2	30.1	15.8	8.6	1.7	0.6	0.0	44.9	54.5	6,444
Örebro	S	3.5	100,130	59.6	12.4	9.7	14.9	2.1	1.3	0.0	61.7	37.0	24,770
Östergötland	G	5.2	150,330	59.6	18.7	10.9	9.0	1.9	0.0	0.0	61.4	38.5	34,421
Total		100.0	2,874,417	53.8	18.0	12.0	12.0	3.5	0.6	0.0	57.3	42.0	441,424
Source: SCB

=== By votes ===
Location	Land	Share	Votes	S	H	B	FP	K	SP	Other	Left	Right	Margin
Location		%											
Blekinge	G	2.0	56,910	31,163	11,303	6,335	7,007	1,102			32,265	24,645	7,620
Bohuslän	G	3.1	89,004	43,220	18,601	10,341	13,833	3,009			46,229	42,775	3,454
Gothenburg	G	5.0	143,560	75,271	31,639		16,051	19,115	585	899	94,386	47,690	46,696
Gotland	G	0.9	24,766	9,074	4,508	7,581	3,480	123			9,197	15,569	6,372
Gävleborg	N	4.0	114,081	68,760	10,095	14,059	12,318	5,576	3,273		74,336	36,472	37,864
Halland	G	2.5	70,897	30,196	13,815	22,527	2,758	1,600		1	31,796	39,100	7,304
Jämtland	N	1.8	51,583	29,308	8,965	7,210	5,315	781		4	30,089	21,490	8,599
Jönköping	G	4.1	117,682	53,152	15,599	22,275	24,052	2,603		1	55,755	61,926	6,171
Kalmar	G	3.5	99,845	47,957	22,076	22,671	5,393	1,748			49,705	50,140	435
Kopparberg	S	3.7	105,874	64,319	9,761	11,873	15,857	2,059	2,005		66,378	37,491	28,887
Kristianstad	G	3.7	107,726	54,083	17,081	21,577	14,130	854		1	54,937	52,788	2,149
Kronoberg	G	2.3	65,756	28,975	14,796	16,287	3,662	2,034		2	31,009	34,745	3,736
Malmö area	G	4.8	138,890	93,580	32,915	799	10,131	1,465			95,045	43,845	51,200
Malmöhus	G	4.5	130,195	74,070	17,387	28,761	9,976			1	74,070	56,124	17,946
Norrbotten	N	2.5	70,585	35,925	12,766	5,577	3,849	12,464		4	48,389	22,192	26,197
Skaraborg	G	3.7	104,926	43,309	23,239	22,160	14,722	1,496			44,805	60,121	15,316
Stockholm	S	10.8	309,331	160,822	83,901		41,205	17,811	5,567	25	178,633	125,106	53,527
Stockholm County	S	4.6	131,083	73,660	23,890	8,956	17,243	4,371	2,963		78,031	50,089	27,942
Södermanland	S	3.2	92,733	57,576	11,607	10,447	11,483	759	861		58,335	33,537	24,798
Uppsala	S	2.2	61,900	33,708	9,668	8,936	8,879	709			34,417	27,483	6,934
Värmland	S	4.1	117,442	68,811	14,408	12,988	15,453	4,385	1,397		73,196	42,849	30,347
Västerbotten	N	2.9	83,036	38,104	15,119	7,047	21,691	1,074		1	39,178	43,857	4,679
Västernorrland	N	4.1	116,595	69,850	13,562	14,203	12,100	6,874		6	76,724	39,865	36,859
Västmanland	S	2.7	76,853	46,948	8,555	10,825	8,285	2,238	2		49,186	27,665	21,521
Älvsborg N	G	2.6	75,664	36,807	12,360	14,331	11,066	1,100			37,907	37,757	150
Älvsborg S	G	2.3	67,040	28,953	20,158	10,585	5,782	1,128	434		30,081	36,525	6,444
Örebro	S	3.5	100,130	59,650	12,431	9,665	14,912	2,128	1,343	1	61,778	37,008	24,770
Östergötland	G	5.2	150,330	89,553	28,141	16,329	13,480	2,818		9	92,371	57,950	34,421
Total		100.0	2,874,417	1,546,804	518,346	344,345	344,113	101,424	18,430	955	1,648,228	1,206,804	441,424
Source: SCB

== Results by city and district ==
=== Blekinge ===
Location	Share	Votes	S	AV	B	FP	K	Left	Right
Bräkne	13.0	7,377	56.5	14.9	20.1	6.0	2.4	58.9	41.1
Karlshamn	8.2	4,676	54.7	29.0	0.8	12.5	3.0	57.7	42.3
Karlskrona	18.9	10,784	56.9	24.8	0.1	16.2	1.9	58.8	41.2
Lister	17.9	10,182	50.5	21.0	13.3	12.5	2.7	53.2	46.8
Medelstad	19.2	10,954	56.7	13.9	18.6	9.4	1.4	58.1	41.9
Ronneby	4.5	2,585	61.3	23.8	0.4	12.5	1.9	63.2	36.8
Sölvesborg	3.2	1,839	57.1	26.5	0.1	15.1	1.3	58.3	41.7
Östra	13.6	7,724	50.6	14.7	17.7	16.1	0.9	51.5	48.5
Postal vote	1.4	789							
Total	2.0	56,910	54.8	19.9	11.1	12.3	1.9	56.7	43.3
Source: SCB

=== Gothenburg and Bohuslän ===
==== Bohuslän ====
Location	Share	Votes	S	AV	B	FP	K	Left	Right
Askim	10.9	9,686	50.2	22.9	6.9	16.3	3.8	54.0	46.0
Bullaren	0.8	752	15.2	18.1	39.2	26.6	0.9	16.1	83.9
Inlands Fräkne	2.1	1,883	31.4	27.7	20.4	20.3	0.2	31.5	68.5
Inlands Nordre	4.4	3,923	28.3	34.2	25.0	12.4	0.1	28.3	71.7
Inlands Södre	3.2	2,888	30.3	27.3	32.1	9.8	0.6	30.9	69.1
Inlands Torpe	2.0	1,755	59.9	10.1	23.1	5.8	1.0	61.0	39.0
Kungälv	1.7	1,523	63.7	23.9	0.7	10.2	1.5	65.2	34.7
Kville	2.1	1,850	35.5	12.1	28.4	23.8	0.2	35.7	64.3
Lane	2.8	2,520	31.3	19.2	25.3	23.9	0.2	31.5	68.5
Lysekil	3.1	2,784	62.2	24.9	0.1	8.4	4.4	66.6	33.4
Marstrand	0.6	505	55.0	21.2	0.0	22.8	1.0	56.0	44.0
Mölndal	8.7	7,760	64.3	9.0	1.9	7.5	17.3	81.6	18.4
Orust Västra	4.5	3,962	35.9	32.0	7.9	24.0	0.2	36.1	63.9
Orust Östra	1.9	1,684	37.4	19.9	22.2	20.5	0.0	37.4	62.6
Sotenäs	5.9	5,278	57.3	15.6	2.7	22.1	2.3	59.6	40.4
Strömstad	1.4	1,289	55.0	31.7	0.7	12.3	0.3	55.3	44.7
Stångenäs	4.0	3,533	59.7	24.6	4.7	10.8	0.2	59.9	40.1
Sävedal	6.5	5,821	54.3	15.3	8.8	11.8	9.8	64.1	35.9
Sörbygden	1.5	1,298	13.8	42.9	31.2	12.1	0.0	13.8	86.2
Tanum	3.0	2,698	33.2	27.7	22.3	16.8	0.0	33.2	66.8
Tjörn	3.0	2,677	19.5	27.4	9.4	43.4	0.3	19.8	80.2
Tunge	4.1	3,627	55.9	16.5	11.4	15.2	1.0	56.9	43.1
Uddevalla	8.9	7,952	64.2	17.7	0.2	16.7	1.2	65.4	34.6
Vette	4.1	3,677	58.3	8.6	24.5	8.5	0.1	58.3	41.7
Västra Hising	6.9	6,179	41.0	25.7	16.0	14.1	3.2	44.2	55.8
Östra Hising	0.6	495	39.2	11.1	40.8	5.9	3.0	42.2	57.8
Postal vote	1.1	1,005							
Total	3.1	89,004	48.6	20.9	11.6	15.5	3.4	51.9	48.1
Source: SCB

==== Gothenburg ====
Location	Share	Votes	S	AV	FP	K	SP	Left	Right
Gothenburg	100.0	143,560	52.4	22.0	11.2	13.3	0.4	65.7	33.2
Total	5.0	143,560	52.4	22.0	11.2	13.3	0.4	65.7	33.2
Source: SCB

=== Gotland ===
Location	Share	Votes	S	AV	B	FP	K	Left	Right
Gotland Norra	39.3	9,745	39.7	12.8	36.2	10.4	0.8	40.5	59.5
Gotland Södra	38.8	9,618	24.2	13.3	41.0	21.4	0.1	24.3	75.7
Visby	20.9	5,172	54.0	36.3	1.5	7.6	0.6	54.6	45.4
Postal vote	0.9	231							
Total	0.9	24,766	36.6	18.2	30.6	14.1	0.5	37.1	62.9
Source: SCB

=== Gävleborg ===
Location	Share	Votes	S	AV	B	FP	K	SP	Left	Right
Ala	9.9	11,328	66.0	3.8	14.0	5.3	10.2	0.7	76.2	23.1
Bergsjö-Forsa	9.2	10,450	48.5	4.4	28.2	11.2	4.8	2.9	53.4	43.8
Bollnäs ting	12.3	13,976	56.6	5.7	17.5	14.7	4.4	1.1	61.0	37.9
Delsbo	3.1	3,557	41.2	7.9	43.1	5.0	0.9	1.9	42.1	56.0
Enånger	2.9	3,284	51.8	4.5	15.9	6.5	11.6	9.7	63.3	27.0
Gästrikland Västra	11.9	13,631	60.8	6.8	12.8	9.6	6.0	4.0	66.8	29.2
Gästrikland Östra	16.6	18,939	68.8	6.2	5.9	10.8	3.8	4.5	72.6	22.9
Gävle	15.5	17,708	67.0	16.4	0.0	14.4	0.5	1.8	67.5	30.8
Hudiksvall	2.8	3,223	49.0	21.3	1.7	12.8	8.5	6.7	57.5	35.8
Söderhamn	4.1	4,653	63.6	19.0	0.2	7.5	8.7	0.9	72.4	26.8
Västra Hälsingland	10.6	12,038	55.6	8.9	17.0	10.6	4.7	3.2	60.2	36.5
Postal vote	1.1	1,294								
Total	4.0	114,081	60.3	8.8	12.3	10.8	4.9	2.9	65.2	32.0
Source: SCB

=== Halland ===
Location	Share	Votes	S	AV	B	FP	K	Left	Right
Falkenberg	4.6	3,292	61.5	26.9	4.8	5.6	1.3	62.8	37.2
Faurås	9.5	6,711	25.2	16.1	56.3	2.4	0.0	25.2	74.8
Fjäre	10.9	7,738	31.0	21.5	44.6	2.4	0.5	31.5	68.5
Halmstad	18.4	13,018	62.7	21.7	1.8	6.0	7.8	70.5	29.5
Halmstad hundred	10.1	7,188	49.5	17.0	29.9	2.0	1.6	51.1	48.9
Himle	7.3	5,152	26.3	18.3	51.1	3.9	0.5	26.8	73.2
Hök	11.2	7,926	29.6	8.9	59.3	2.0	0.2	29.8	70.2
Kungsbacka	1.6	1,147	41.8	46.6	1.9	8.9	0.7	42.5	57.5
Laholm	1.7	1,191	47.4	26.2	18.5	7.8	0.1	47.5	52.5
Tönnersjö	6.9	4,911	47.1	11.9	36.2	2.3	2.5	49.6	50.4
Varberg	7.1	5,013	60.7	23.9	2.0	9.6	3.8	64.5	35.5
Viske	3.3	2,327	20.6	18.4	57.6	3.2	0.2	20.8	79.2
Årstad	6.7	4,729	33.9	24.8	40.0	1.1	0.1	34.0	66.0
Postal vote	0.8	554							
Total	2.5	70,897	42.6	19.5	31.8	3.9	2.3	44.8	55.2
Source: SCB

=== Jämtland ===
Location	Share	Votes	S	AV	B	FP	K	Left	Right
Berg	5.0	2,583	54.2	15.8	18.5	9.1	2.4	56.6	43.4
Hammerdal	11.8	6,076	56.6	16.7	17.1	8.7	0.9	57.6	42.4
Hede	3.1	1,616	66.0	12.4	7.7	12.4	1.5	67.6	32.4
Jämtland Västra	20.8	10,754	49.5	16.7	17.0	15.3	1.6	51.1	48.9
Lits-Rödön	14.3	7,393	51.6	14.2	20.7	12.4	1.1	52.8	47.2
Ragunda	12.0	6,206	69.9	13.7	11.0	4.4	0.9	70.8	29.2
Revsund-Brunflo-Näs	13.1	6,745	60.7	13.4	17.3	7.3	1.2	62.0	38.0
Sveg	5.7	2,927	70.7	10.8	6.4	8.2	3.9	74.6	25.4
Östersund	12.5	6,466	51.8	33.7	2.1	10.9	1.6	53.4	46.6
Postal vote	1.6	817							
Total	1.9	51,583	56.8	17.4	14.0	10.3	1.5	58.3	41.7
Source: SCB

=== Jönköping ===
Location	Share	Votes	S	AV	B	FP	K	Left	Right
Eksjö	2.9	3,398	49.4	26.9	1.4	21.6	0.6	50.1	49.9
Gränna	0.5	632	40.8	26.4	2.4	28.3	2.1	42.9	57.1
Huskvarna	4.2	4,956	65.2	7.3	0.7	16.4	10.4	75.7	24.3
Jönköping	14.8	17,438	57.4	19.1	0.9	19.4	3.2	60.6	39.4
Mo	2.6	3,028	21.3	6.7	31.9	40.1	0.0	21.4	78.6
Norra Vedbo	5.6	6,610	37.1	15.6	20.6	26.4	0.3	37.4	62.6
Nässjö	4.3	5,091	62.7	17.7	1.2	15.4	3.0	65.7	34.3
Södra Vedbo	5.9	6,901	41.0	10.0	29.6	18.8	0.6	41.6	58.4
Tranås	3.0	3,579	60.3	16.9	1.0	20.7	1.1	61.4	38.6
Tveta	9.1	10,757	50.9	7.5	16.5	22.8	2.3	53.2	46.8
Vetlanda	1.7	1,980	50.5	25.2	0.8	18.4	5.1	55.6	44.4
Vista	2.6	3,027	30.8	7.9	28.7	32.0	0.6	31.4	68.6
Värnamo	2.4	2,871	56.4	20.6	1.3	15.6	6.2	62.6	37.4
Västbo	13.7	16,090	40.6	10.2	35.8	12.0	1.4	42.0	58.0
Västra	9.7	11,410	31.2	8.7	36.0	23.1	1.0	32.2	67.8
Östbo	8.2	9,598	36.8	14.7	22.2	24.3	1.9	38.7	61.3
Östra	7.6	8,968	39.6	9.0	30.6	19.5	1.4	41.0	59.0
Postal vote	1.1	1,348							
Total	4.1	117,682	45.2	13.3	18.9	20.4	2.2	47.4	52.6
Source: SCB

=== Kalmar ===
Location	Share	Votes	S	AV	B	FP	K	Left	Right
Algutsrum	2.5	2,512	41.8	32.1	24.8	1.0	0.4	42.1	57.9
Aspeland	6.5	6,516	48.2	16.0	25.4	10.0	0.3	48.6	51.4
Borgholm	1.0	964	57.1	23.9	8.3	10.8	0.0	57.1	42.9
Gräsgård	1.9	1,903	53.9	20.3	23.9	2.0	0.0	53.9	46.1
Handbörd	5.9	5,859	47.2	20.4	23.6	5.3	3.4	50.7	49.3
Kalmar	9.9	9,875	60.1	29.8	1.0	7.0	2.1	62.1	37.9
Möckleby	1.1	1,144	16.0	31.5	51.9	0.5	0.1	16.1	83.9
Norra Möre	4.9	4,847	48.3	24.3	24.8	2.1	0.5	48.8	51.2
Norra Tjust	7.2	7,151	53.5	18.6	24.7	3.3	0.1	53.5	46.5
Nybro	2.4	2,366	56.6	26.1	1.0	7.3	9.0	65.6	34.4
Oskarshamn	4.3	4,285	68.9	20.7	0.2	9.2	1.0	69.9	30.1
Runsten	1.7	1,666	15.7	14.8	69.1	0.4	0.0	15.7	84.3
Sevede	6.7	6,702	35.6	19.3	38.1	6.0	0.9	36.6	63.4
Slättbo	1.2	1,220	27.3	11.7	59.4	1.6	0.0	27.3	72.7
Stranda	5.7	5,705	50.9	20.1	17.8	6.0	5.3	56.1	43.9
Södra Möre	14.4	14,393	41.8	22.8	30.5	3.3	1.6	43.4	56.6
Södra Tjust	8.4	8,425	52.0	16.1	25.6	3.9	2.3	54.4	45.6
Tunalän	4.3	4,326	41.1	25.7	26.4	6.1	0.8	41.9	58.1
Vimmerby	1.7	1,671	48.8	31.5	7.8	11.7	0.2	49.0	51.0
Västervik	4.9	4,928	55.8	30.0	1.2	9.7	3.3	59.2	40.8
Åkerbo	2.2	2,205	31.6	5.9	59.1	3.1	0.3	31.9	68.1
Postal vote	1.2	1,182							
Total	3.5	99,845	48.0	22.1	22.7	5.4	1.8	49.8	50.2
Source: SCB

=== Kopparberg ===
Location	Share	Votes	S	AV	B	FP	K	SP	Left	Right
Avesta	2.9	3,068	71.5	6.8	0.0	10.6	4.6	6.5	76.1	17.4
Falu Norra	8.2	8,724	58.4	7.5	10.8	19.6	0.6	3.3	58.9	37.8
Falu Södra	13.4	14,202	64.1	6.5	13.6	11.3	1.9	2.5	66.0	31.5
Falun	5.9	6,299	54.6	24.8	0.3	19.6	0.5	0.2	55.1	44.6
Folkare	6.5	6,853	55.6	6.9	18.2	11.9	3.6	3.8	59.2	37.0
Hedemora	1.9	2,043	55.3	16.6	2.8	23.1	2.2	0.0	57.5	42.5
Hedemora	7.7	8,155	57.5	4.9	27.0	9.1	0.6	1.0	58.1	41.0
Leksand-Gagnef	9.3	9,802	51.3	8.1	16.7	23.1	0.4	0.4	51.6	47.9
Ludvika	3.2	3,381	66.9	17.2	0.1	11.0	2.7	2.2	69.5	28.3
Malung	5.7	6,014	67.7	9.5	4.5	16.3	1.5	0.6	69.2	30.2
Mora	6.1	6,416	52.2	8.9	14.7	21.7	0.8	1.6	53.1	45.3
Nås	6.2	6,573	64.9	8.4	10.9	11.4	2.7	1.6	67.7	30.7
Orsa	2.9	3,032	55.6	12.8	14.9	13.8	1.0	1.8	56.7	41.5
Rättvik	4.2	4,441	49.6	9.6	11.8	21.5	5.2	2.3	54.7	43.0
Särna-Idre	0.8	840	63.2	6.7	0.8	23.5	1.3	4.5	64.5	31.0
Säter	1.1	1,120	65.1	14.9	0.5	18.8	0.6	0.0	65.7	34.3
Västerbergslag	11.2	11,864	74.3	6.0	5.9	8.1	4.0	1.7	78.4	20.0
Älvdalen	2.0	2,074	68.0	6.9	9.1	13.9	0.2	1.8	68.2	30.0
Postal vote	0.9	973								
Total	3.7	105,874	60.8	9.2	11.2	15.0	1.9	1.9	62.7	35.4
Source: SCB

=== Kristianstad ===
Location	Share	Votes	S	AV	B	FP	K	Left	Right
Albo	3.5	3,772	42.5	14.8	20.7	21.8	0.2	42.7	57.3
Bjäre	6.2	6,696	40.1	17.0	37.7	5.3	0.0	40.1	59.9
Gärd	9.1	9,843	55.8	11.4	13.6	19.0	0.2	56.0	44.0
Hässleholm	1.6	1,764	56.5	27.2	1.8	14.5	0.0	56.5	43.5
Ingelstad	9.9	10,660	45.7	14.5	21.8	18.0	0.0	45.7	54.3
Järrestad	3.6	3,858	52.2	12.4	20.5	14.9	0.1	52.3	47.7
Kristianstad	6.6	7,081	52.7	27.9	1.7	16.8	0.8	53.5	46.5
Norra Åsbo	11.8	12,725	48.5	16.1	27.6	7.6	0.2	48.7	51.3
Simrishamn	1.2	1,340	59.1	30.6	0.1	10.2	0.0	59.1	40.9
Södra Åsbo	6.6	7,134	56.2	10.5	28.6	4.7	0.1	56.3	43.7
Villand	9.8	10,524	59.1	11.9	14.6	11.2	3.2	62.3	37.7
Västra Göinge	14.0	15,132	40.0	16.1	27.1	16.5	0.4	40.4	59.6
Ängelholm	2.9	3,156	65.7	25.3	2.4	6.5	0.0	65.7	34.3
Östra Göinge	12.0	12,935	53.1	13.1	18.1	13.0	2.6	55.7	44.3
Postal vote	1.0	1,106							
Total	3.7	107,726	50.2	15.9	20.0	15.0	0.8	51.0	49.0
Source: SCB

=== Kronoberg ===
Location	Share	Votes	S	AV	B	FP	K	Left	Right
Allbo	18.1	11,904	42.6	24.7	25.8	5.5	1.4	44.0	56.0
Kinnevald	9.3	6,101	39.3	30.5	25.7	2.8	1.7	41.0	59.0
Konga	16.1	10,603	44.5	19.7	28.6	2.9	4.3	48.8	51.2
Ljungby	3.6	2,397	50.1	23.4	6.5	15.0	4.9	55.1	44.9
Norrvidinge	5.1	3,362	40.2	24.0	33.0	2.4	0.5	40.7	59.3
Sunnerbo	20.2	13,294	34.9	20.3	34.0	9.7	1.2	36.1	63.9
Uppvidinge	16.7	11,013	53.4	12.5	23.0	3.4	7.7	61.1	38.9
Växjö	9.6	6,321	53.2	35.2	3.4	5.9	2.2	55.5	44.5
Postal vote	1.2	761							
Total	2.3	65,756	44.1	22.5	24.8	5.6	3.1	47.2	52.8
Source: SCB

=== Malmöhus ===
==== Malmö area ====
Location	Share	Votes	S	AV	B	FP	K	Left	Right
Hälsingborg	22.1	30,640	67.2	25.1	0.7	6.7	0.7	67.5	32.5
Landskrona	8.0	11,095	74.7	13.0	0.3	10.6	1.4	76.1	23.9
Lund	10.5	14,532	59.4	28.2	1.2	10.5	0.7	60.0	40.0
Malmö	57.7	80,161	68.9	23.0	0.5	6.4	1.2	70.1	29.9
Postal vote	1.8	2,462							
Total	4.8	138,890	67.4	23.7	0.6	7.3	1.1	68.4	31.6
Source: SCB

==== Malmöhus County ====
Location	Share	Votes	S	AV	B	FP	Left	Right
Bara	7.8	10,142	65.5	13.6	17.5	3.4	65.5	34.5
Eslöv	2.6	3,430	62.7	24.4	3.3	9.6	62.7	37.3
Frosta	8.5	11,130	38.0	12.2	26.1	23.7	38.0	62.0
Färs	7.6	9,877	40.5	10.8	26.9	21.8	40.5	59.5
Harjager	4.6	5,941	58.2	12.5	27.0	2.3	58.2	41.8
Herrestad	2.5	3,258	59.9	8.6	21.9	9.7	59.9	40.1
Höganäs	2.9	3,744	82.0	12.2	1.7	4.1	82.0	18.0
Ljunit	2.1	2,689	52.7	7.2	32.9	7.2	52.7	47.3
Luggude	14.1	18,302	59.6	11.7	25.4	3.3	59.6	40.4
Onsjö	5.6	7,326	50.8	11.2	35.2	2.8	50.8	49.2
Oxie	6.5	8,497	64.1	11.8	21.4	2.8	64.1	35.9
Rönneberg	4.3	5,581	62.0	14.4	20.9	2.7	62.0	38.0
Skanör-Falsterbo	0.3	436	31.9	45.9	10.8	11.5	31.9	68.1
Skytt	4.9	6,407	55.5	13.9	26.0	4.6	55.5	44.5
Torna	7.6	9,872	56.0	11.3	29.9	2.8	56.0	44.0
Trelleborg	5.2	6,728	71.3	19.7	0.8	8.2	71.3	28.7
Vemmenhög	7.4	9,643	52.4	10.5	30.5	6.6	52.4	47.6
Ystad	4.5	5,865	67.0	22.3	0.3	10.5	67.0	33.0
Postal vote	1.0	1,327						
Total	4.5	130,195	56.9	13.4	22.1	7.7	56.9	43.1
Source: SCB

=== Norrbotten ===
Location	Share	Votes	S	AV	B	FP	K	Left	Right
Arjeplog	1.5	1,033	51.1	14.4	1.1	8.4	25.0	76.1	23.9
Arvidsjaur	4.8	3,354	50.8	11.7	4.2	12.8	20.5	71.3	28.7
Boden	3.9	2,788	57.4	28.9	0.4	8.0	5.3	62.7	37.3
Gällivare	9.5	6,690	45.4	23.3	0.3	1.4	29.6	75.0	25.0
Haparanda	1.1	810	35.1	50.4	2.0	3.2	9.4	44.4	55.6
Jokkmokk	2.5	1,782	50.4	17.3	1.1	7.0	24.1	74.6	25.4
Jukkasjärvi	7.8	5,486	52.3	14.7	0.2	7.1	25.7	78.0	22.0
Karesuando	0.2	172	36.6	37.8	0.0	19.2	6.4	43.0	57.0
Luleå	8.3	5,873	47.5	26.4	0.4	6.2	19.5	67.0	33.0
Nederkalix	9.7	6,881	55.1	16.5	9.4	5.6	13.4	68.4	31.6
Nederluleå	5.4	3,784	34.1	27.7	19.6	12.5	6.0	40.1	59.9
Pajala-Korpilombolo	4.8	3,361	38.8	25.5	3.7	2.3	29.8	68.6	31.4
Piteå	2.4	1,671	66.7	25.2	0.6	4.4	3.0	69.7	30.2
Piteå-Älvsby	16.9	11,913	63.0	8.1	14.1	2.3	12.5	75.5	24.5
Råneå	4.4	3,136	48.8	16.5	8.2	6.0	20.4	69.3	30.7
Torneå	6.5	4,562	46.2	14.1	19.3	3.3	17.1	63.3	36.7
Överkalix	3.5	2,457	55.2	4.6	18.4	2.7	19.0	74.3	25.7
Överluleå	5.8	4,121	44.8	18.9	12.4	8.3	15.7	60.5	39.5
Postal vote	1.0	711							
Total	2.5	70,585	50.9	18.1	7.9	5.5	17.7	68.6	31.4
Source: SCB

=== Skaraborg ===
Location	Share	Votes	S	AV	B	FP	K	Left	Right
Barne	4.9	5,129	21.5	34.8	29.0	14.2	0.5	22.0	78.0
Falköping	4.1	4,334	54.1	25.9	1.5	18.3	0.1	54.2	45.8
Frökind	1.0	997	12.5	35.1	41.5	10.8	0.0	12.5	87.5
Gudhem	3.6	3,774	38.3	19.3	32.7	9.8	0.1	38.5	61.5
Hjo	1.5	1,567	42.8	32.4	2.0	22.6	0.3	43.0	57.0
Kinne	5.0	5,211	49.3	15.9	12.2	21.1	1.6	50.9	49.1
Kinnefjärding	2.7	2,801	33.0	21.0	29.6	16.3	0.0	33.1	66.9
Kåkind	6.1	6,422	41.2	16.1	26.8	14.4	1.6	42.8	57.2
Kålland	4.5	4,675	31.6	20.3	23.0	24.6	0.6	32.2	67.8
Laske	2.4	2,507	22.8	30.2	34.8	11.8	0.4	23.3	76.7
Lidköping	5.1	5,371	58.1	21.2	0.3	12.7	7.7	65.8	34.2
Mariestad	2.9	3,059	53.1	25.5	0.3	18.1	3.0	56.2	43.8
Skara	3.2	3,389	51.9	28.9	1.7	16.2	1.3	53.3	46.7
Skåning	4.5	4,691	27.9	24.6	34.2	13.0	0.3	28.1	71.9
Skövde	5.4	5,638	50.1	28.4	2.4	15.1	4.1	54.2	45.8
Tidaholm	2.1	2,241	70.7	10.8	0.2	11.5	6.8	77.5	22.5
Vadsbo	19.2	20,106	45.5	17.0	25.3	11.5	0.6	46.1	53.9
Valle	1.8	1,890	46.0	20.1	19.8	13.7	0.4	46.5	53.5
Vartofta	10.3	10,794	38.9	15.8	33.3	11.5	0.5	39.4	60.6
Vilske	2.4	2,511	22.1	30.7	37.3	9.6	0.4	22.4	77.6
Viste	3.9	4,077	23.2	36.1	27.8	11.8	1.1	24.3	75.7
Åse	2.0	2,059	37.6	21.5	30.0	10.7	0.2	37.8	62.2
Postal vote	1.6	1,683							
Total	3.7	104,926	41.3	22.1	21.1	14.0	1.4	42.7	57.3
Source: SCB

=== Stockholm ===
==== Stockholm (city) ====
Location	Share	Votes	S	AV	FP	K	SP	Left	Right
Stockholm	100.0	309,331	52.0	27.1	13.3	5.8	1.8	57.7	40.4
Total	10.8	309,331	52.0	27.1	13.3	5.8	1.8	57.7	40.4
Source: SCB

==== Stockholm County ====
Location	Share	Votes	S	AV	B	FP	K	SP	Left	Right
Bro-Vätö	1.0	1,343	43.1	27.0	14.4	14.1	0.1	1.2	44.5	55.5
Danderyd	13.2	17,365	55.5	20.0	1.0	15.1	6.0	2.4	61.5	36.1
Djursholm	2.3	3,075	31.3	52.9	0.4	14.8	0.4	0.2	31.8	68.1
Frösåker	3.3	4,274	48.2	14.0	27.9	6.3	0.7	2.9	48.9	48.2
Frötuna-Länna	2.0	2,648	37.7	26.2	18.3	17.4	0.2	0.2	37.9	61.9
Färentuna	2.2	2,895	57.2	10.8	20.4	9.9	1.3	0.3	58.5	41.2
Lidingö	4.2	5,533	44.0	35.5	0.1	16.0	2.3	2.0	46.3	51.7
Lyhundra	1.4	1,779	34.1	28.3	23.1	12.1	1.6	0.8	35.7	63.5
Långhundra	1.2	1,573	41.3	16.6	29.6	11.8	0.4	0.4	41.6	58.0
Norrtälje	2.0	2,687	51.2	27.4	0.7	17.3	3.3	0.0	54.6	45.4
Närdinghundra	2.5	3,309	50.8	10.2	23.8	11.6	0.9	2.6	51.7	45.7
Seminghundra	1.0	1,360	38.2	18.8	30.7	10.8	0.4	1.1	38.6	60.3
Sigtuna	0.5	630	45.1	27.1	1.1	26.2	0.5	0.0	45.6	54.4
Sjuhundra	1.7	2,170	53.3	16.0	12.3	15.4	2.7	0.3	55.9	43.7
Sollentuna	11.9	15,620	63.8	13.2	1.1	15.6	3.8	2.5	67.6	29.9
Sotholm	7.0	9,175	62.2	10.2	11.2	10.8	2.7	2.8	65.0	32.2
Sundbyberg	3.9	5,075	69.6	8.2	0.1	10.4	8.6	3.1	78.2	18.7
Svartlösa	14.0	18,305	61.6	17.0	1.6	12.1	5.3	2.4	66.9	30.7
Södertälje	6.1	8,057	64.9	18.8	0.3	9.3	3.1	3.5	68.0	28.5
Vallentuna	2.1	2,772	55.0	17.2	11.5	10.9	1.6	3.9	56.6	39.6
Vaxholm	0.8	1,007	48.2	22.3	0.6	26.8	0.5	1.6	48.7	49.8
Väddö-Häverö	2.7	3,575	49.1	16.4	15.9	9.7	2.0	7.0	51.1	41.9
Värmdö	3.6	4,747	63.7	14.5	3.2	13.9	2.8	1.9	66.5	31.6
Åker	2.0	2,590	49.6	12.0	19.1	16.7	0.8	1.9	50.4	47.7
Ärlinghundra	2.0	2,652	52.8	11.7	20.7	13.1	1.1	0.6	53.9	45.5
Öknebo	3.3	4,308	65.0	16.1	6.1	9.5	1.5	1.7	66.5	31.7
Öregrund	0.4	492	43.9	24.2	1.8	27.8	0.0	2.2	43.9	53.9
Östhammar	0.4	583	39.8	32.9	1.2	25.2	0.3	0.5	40.1	59.3
Postal vote	1.1	1,484								
Total	4.6	131,083	56.2	18.2	6.8	13.2	3.3	2.3	59.5	38.2
Source:SCB

=== Södermanland ===
Location	Share	Votes	S	AV	B	FP	K	SP	Left	Right
Daga	3.6	3,380	47.7	14.1	21.2	15.6	0.0	1.4	47.7	50.9
Eskilstuna	23.1	21,396	74.6	12.0	0.8	9.9	1.3	1.3	75.9	22.8
Hölebo	2.8	2,574	54.3	9.2	24.5	10.5	0.1	1.4	54.4	44.2
Jönåker	8.9	8,249	63.0	9.2	15.8	8.6	1.3	2.1	64.3	33.6
Katrineholm	5.7	5,284	69.4	11.4	0.5	17.6	1.1	0.0	70.5	29.4
Mariefred	0.8	783	52.9	27.1	0.6	19.4	0.0	0.0	52.9	47.1
Nyköping	6.8	6,303	64.4	20.7	0.7	11.8	0.5	1.9	64.9	33.1
Oppunda	14.1	13,046	57.5	8.4	17.3	16.3	0.4	0.1	57.9	42.0
Rönö	4.4	4,111	51.2	8.7	27.1	11.9	0.3	0.8	51.5	47.7
Selebo	2.6	2,376	56.5	11.6	22.2	9.0	0.3	0.4	56.8	42.8
Strängnäs	2.8	2,597	46.8	33.9	1.0	18.1	0.3	0.0	47.1	52.9
Torshälla	1.1	1,037	71.6	15.9	2.5	7.9	1.5	0.5	73.2	26.3
Trosa	0.6	539	53.6	34.5	2.0	9.3	0.0	0.6	53.6	45.8
Villåttinge	8.3	7,716	57.9	12.2	15.0	11.6	1.6	1.6	59.6	38.9
Västerrekarne	3.8	3,552	52.9	9.4	23.0	13.8	0.7	0.2	53.5	46.2
Åker	3.5	3,245	63.0	9.0	17.4	10.6	0.1	0.0	63.0	37.0
Österrekarne	5.4	5,000	56.0	10.7	18.8	14.2	0.2	0.1	56.1	43.7
Postal vote	1.7	1,545								
Total	3.2	92,733	62.1	12.5	11.3	12.4	0.8	0.9	62.9	36.4
Source: SCB

=== Uppsala ===
Location	Share	Votes	S	AV	B	FP	K	Left	Right
Bro	1.8	1,132	66.2	16.6	11.5	5.1	0.6	66.8	33.2
Bälinge	1.9	1,189	25.6	10.3	52.1	11.9	0.2	25.7	74.3
Enköping	4.5	2,782	61.6	23.0	0.8	13.2	1.5	63.0	37.0
Hagunda	2.9	1,772	42.7	13.5	31.7	11.6	0.5	43.2	56.8
Håbo	2.7	1,667	62.3	21.5	7.2	8.9	0.0	62.3	37.7
Lagunda	2.3	1,418	47.0	16.1	25.6	11.2	0.0	47.0	53.0
Norunda	3.8	2,346	46.2	9.6	26.2	17.4	0.6	46.8	53.2
Oland	13.2	8,194	48.9	8.4	23.1	18.5	1.2	50.1	49.9
Rasbo	2.1	1,295	48.4	8.3	30.0	12.7	0.6	49.0	51.0
Trögd	5.0	3,087	43.8	15.4	32.9	7.7	0.2	44.0	56.0
Ulleråker	5.5	3,394	58.4	10.4	13.4	15.6	2.2	60.6	39.4
Uppsala	29.4	18,180	54.2	25.1	0.6	18.3	1.8	56.0	44.0
Vaksala	3.0	1,842	52.5	13.0	23.4	10.0	1.0	53.5	46.5
Åsunda	3.0	1,869	41.7	13.5	39.2	5.0	0.6	42.3	57.7
Örbyhus	17.6	10,876	69.0	5.6	13.7	11.2	0.7	69.7	30.3
Postal vote	1.4	857							
Total	2.2	61,900	54.5	15.6	14.4	14.3	1.1	55.6	44.4
Source: SCB

=== Värmland ===
Location	Share	Votes	S	AV	B	FP	K	SP	Left	Right
Arvika	3.2	3,744	56.5	15.3	0.3	19.6	6.5	1.8	63.0	35.2
Filipstad	2.0	2,306	52.2	22.5	0.1	19.6	5.3	0.3	57.5	42.3
Fryksdal	11.3	13,241	48.3	15.2	18.9	12.6	3.7	1.3	52.0	46.7
Färnebo	6.8	7,989	78.7	5.6	2.2	7.0	5.0	1.6	83.7	14.7
Gillberg	4.4	5,148	57.7	10.9	16.7	12.9	1.0	1.0	58.6	40.4
Grums	4.2	4,970	65.9	7.0	15.4	6.7	4.4	0.6	70.3	29.1
Jösse	8.7	10,250	55.7	12.5	12.1	15.4	3.4	0.9	59.1	40.0
Karlstad	10.1	11,881	58.9	19.5	0.9	17.3	2.1	1.3	61.0	37.6
Karlstad hundred	5.1	6,002	72.1	8.7	4.5	8.2	5.7	0.9	77.8	21.3
Kil	7.5	8,764	63.5	7.1	13.8	12.2	1.5	1.9	64.9	33.1
Kristinehamn	5.5	6,506	65.0	16.3	0.2	16.6	1.9	0.0	66.9	33.1
Nordmark	5.9	6,883	43.7	12.6	20.8	21.5	0.7	0.7	44.4	54.9
Nyed	2.1	2,463	51.0	10.2	21.9	14.6	1.9	0.4	52.9	46.7
Näs	4.8	5,676	46.1	14.5	25.6	9.7	2.2	2.0	48.3	49.7
Visnum	2.4	2,793	49.1	9.0	22.4	13.7	3.9	2.0	53.0	45.1
Väse	2.7	3,224	43.5	11.3	26.4	18.5	0.2	0.1	43.8	56.1
Älvdal	10.6	12,429	67.5	8.4	4.3	8.0	10.0	1.8	77.5	20.7
Ölme	1.3	1,549	50.2	13.4	20.5	15.7	0.3	0.0	50.5	49.5
Postal vote	1.4	1,624								
Total	4.1	117,442	58.6	12.3	11.1	13.2	3.7	1.2	62.3	36.5
Source: SCB

=== Västerbotten ===
Location	Share	Votes	S	AV	B	FP	K	Left	Right
Burträsk	4.1	3,397	28.7	27.2	14.5	29.4	0.2	28.9	71.1
Degerfors	4.9	4,089	40.7	15.0	2.9	41.1	0.2	40.9	59.1
Lycksele	11.3	9,364	46.4	13.1	2.1	36.4	2.1	48.5	51.5
Norsjö-Malå	4.7	3,922	43.3	16.9	1.6	34.4	3.7	47.1	52.9
Nordmaling-Bjurholm	9.9	8,211	47.4	15.4	13.1	23.8	0.3	47.6	52.4
Nysätra	8.0	6,618	31.6	21.0	16.3	31.1	0.1	31.6	68.4
Skellefteå	4.3	3,535	52.3	29.2	0.3	14.9	3.3	55.6	44.4
Skellefteå ting	19.7	16,386	46.8	23.4	8.1	20.1	1.7	48.4	51.6
Umeå	6.7	5,571	50.7	29.6	0.7	18.1	0.9	51.6	48.4
Umeå ting	14.7	12,228	42.7	13.1	16.2	26.6	1.4	44.1	55.9
Vilhelmina	6.9	5,752	64.5	5.9	6.8	21.8	1.0	65.5	34.5
Åsele	3.5	2,942	56.1	10.6	8.5	24.6	0.3	56.3	43.7
Postal vote	1.2	1,021							
Total	2.9	83,036	45.9	18.2	8.5	26.1	1.3	47.2	52.8
Source: SCB

=== Västernorrland ===
Location	Share	Votes	S	AV	B	FP	K	Left	Right
Boteå	5.3	6,191	65.7	8.4	15.1	4.6	6.0	71.8	28.1
Härnösand	4.6	5,363	50.8	28.7	0.4	18.5	1.7	52.5	47.5
Medelpad Västra	12.3	14,285	62.2	6.0	16.4	9.6	5.7	67.9	32.1
Medelpad Östra	19.8	23,139	71.9	5.2	8.0	7.5	7.3	79.2	20.8
Sollefteå	1.1	1,322	45.0	39.9	4.8	9.7	0.5	45.5	54.5
Sollefteå	3.8	4,387	70.4	9.3	14.1	2.1	4.1	74.4	25.6
Sundsvall	7.1	8,291	51.7	29.9	0.4	16.1	1.9	53.6	46.4
Ångermanland Norra	16.9	19,717	54.0	11.5	14.9	17.0	2.5	56.6	43.4
Ångermanland Södra	17.1	19,890	55.8	7.3	15.2	9.5	12.1	67.9	32.1
Ångermanland Västra	8.6	10,065	58.9	11.2	22.6	2.6	4.7	63.6	36.4
Örnsköldsvik	2.2	2,514	43.3	32.0	0.6	20.8	3.3	46.6	53.4
Postal vote	1.2	1,431							
Total	4.1	116,595	59.9	11.6	12.2	10.4	5.9	65.8	34.2
Source: SCB

=== Västmanland ===
Location	Share	Votes	S	AV	B	FP	K	Left	Right
Arboga	3.1	2,363	65.1	16.5	0.7	17.3	0.3	65.5	34.5
Gamla Norberg	10.1	7,773	75.9	9.0	6.4	7.3	1.4	77.2	22.8
Köping	4.7	3,594	63.5	16.6	6.6	10.1	3.2	66.7	33.3
Norrbo	3.4	2,638	61.0	4.4	26.9	7.5	0.2	61.3	38.7
Sala	5.0	3,866	58.3	22.3	5.3	12.9	1.3	59.6	40.4
Siende	3.1	2,416	67.6	6.4	15.7	7.6	2.6	70.2	29.8
Simtuna	5.2	4,009	43.1	11.5	31.4	11.4	2.6	45.7	54.3
Skinnskatteberg	3.0	2,302	73.8	6.3	11.1	6.3	2.6	76.3	23.7
Snevringe	12.9	9,899	68.4	5.8	11.9	7.4	6.5	74.9	25.1
Torstuna	2.8	2,153	45.1	15.7	20.1	11.3	7.8	52.9	47.0
Tuhundra	1.2	944	45.0	4.9	40.1	9.5	0.4	45.4	54.6
Vagnsbro	2.0	1,505	36.1	3.1	42.5	18.1	0.1	36.3	63.7
Våla	4.7	3,646	40.8	6.3	32.7	19.9	0.4	41.1	58.9
Västerås	22.5	17,288	66.9	16.4	0.9	12.7	3.2	70.0	30.0
Yttertjurbo	1.3	1,032	49.2	9.6	32.4	8.6	0.2	49.4	50.6
Åkerbo	9.7	7,473	60.0	6.7	20.3	9.0	4.0	64.0	36.0
Övertjurbo	3.7	2,809	33.0	6.7	48.9	11.2	0.2	33.2	66.8
Postal vote	1.5	1,143							
Total	2.7	76,853	61.1	11.1	14.1	10.8	2.9	64.0	36.0
Source: SCB

=== Älvsborg ===
==== Älvsborg N ====
Location	Share	Votes	S	AV	B	FP	K	Left	Right
Ale	8.8	6,682	52.8	10.4	26.2	7.1	3.5	56.3	43.7
Alingsås	6.0	4,505	54.7	19.1	0.1	23.3	2.8	57.5	42.5
Bjärke	2.5	1,867	24.2	20.0	19.4	36.2	0.3	24.5	75.5
Flundre	4.3	3,291	66.9	8.5	17.0	4.2	3.3	70.2	29.8
Gäsene	5.2	3,912	16.0	36.9	28.0	18.9	0.2	16.2	83.8
Kulling	9.6	7,251	31.1	20.8	17.8	29.6	0.8	31.9	68.1
Nordal	5.5	4,137	46.5	13.0	30.7	9.8	0.0	46.5	53.5
Sundal	5.6	4,226	14.9	19.3	59.5	6.4	0.0	14.9	85.1
Trollhättan	9.5	7,191	75.4	11.8	0.3	9.4	3.1	78.5	21.5
Tössbo	3.4	2,594	41.0	12.5	31.0	15.4	0.1	41.1	58.9
Valbo	5.0	3,789	38.2	16.6	38.3	6.9	0.0	38.2	61.8
Vedbo	10.2	7,731	50.4	9.1	22.7	17.4	0.5	50.9	49.1
Väne	6.9	5,245	64.3	10.3	14.9	8.3	2.2	66.4	33.6
Vänersborg	4.9	3,712	60.6	26.3	0.5	12.0	0.6	61.2	38.8
Vättle	7.3	5,501	51.1	18.1	10.0	18.4	2.5	53.6	46.4
Åmål	4.3	3,242	63.8	19.4	0.8	15.6	0.4	64.2	35.8
Postal vote	1.0	788							
Total	2.6	75,664	48.6	16.3	18.9	14.6	1.5	50.1	49.9
Source: SCB

==== Älvsborg S ====
Location	Share	Votes	S	AV	B	FP	K	SP	Left	Right
Bollebygd	4.1	2,762	43.6	36.5	10.3	8.5	1.0	0.1	44.6	55.3
Borås	29.5	19,797	56.3	29.6	0.3	9.2	3.2	1.4	59.4	39.1
Kind	19.3	12,909	34.5	26.9	30.2	8.3	0.1	0.1	34.6	65.3
Mark	23.3	15,608	46.6	30.1	17.7	2.5	2.2	0.8	48.9	50.4
Redväg	5.5	3,707	16.7	24.0	39.4	19.8	0.0	0.1	16.7	83.2
Ulricehamn	4.3	2,915	41.1	31.2	4.1	23.2	0.5	0.0	41.6	58.4
Veden	4.9	3,288	33.1	39.3	16.7	9.6	1.2	0.0	34.4	65.6
Ås	7.7	5,175	30.9	32.6	26.9	8.9	0.5	0.1	31.5	68.4
Postal vote	1.3	879								
Total	2.3	67,040	43.2	30.1	15.8	8.6	1.7	0.6	44.9	54.5
Source: SCB

=== Örebro ===
Location	Share	Votes	S	AV	B	FP	K	SP	Left	Right
Asker	3.7	3,689	41.4	10.8	21.1	26.2	0.1	0.5	41.4	58.0
Askersund	1.1	1,083	50.5	27.4	2.7	19.1	0.3	0.0	50.8	49.2
Edsberg	5.0	5,000	54.2	9.0	16.9	17.5	0.8	1.5	55.1	43.4
Fellingsbro	4.3	4,272	49.5	12.1	20.9	16.3	0.3	0.9	49.8	49.3
Glanshammar	2.3	2,326	38.8	14.4	25.2	21.2	0.1	0.3	39.0	60.8
Grimsten	3.2	3,169	64.2	6.2	9.9	15.4	3.5	0.8	67.6	31.6
Grythytte-Hällefors	3.9	3,952	70.8	5.2	0.8	8.2	7.1	7.9	77.9	14.2
Hardemo	0.8	840	38.7	13.2	31.8	14.6	1.7	0.0	40.4	59.6
Karlskoga	9.3	9,322	65.3	11.1	6.1	7.9	6.1	3.5	71.3	25.2
Karlskoga hundred	3.5	3,456	72.8	5.3	10.0	8.0	3.1	0.8	75.9	23.3
Kumla hundred	9.5	9,501	58.1	12.0	7.7	18.4	3.5	0.3	61.6	38.0
Linde-Ramsberg	4.5	4,458	57.0	7.0	25.2	8.9	0.0	1.9	57.0	41.1
Lindesberg	2.1	2,120	51.6	25.1	1.3	18.5	0.6	2.9	52.2	44.9
Nora	1.4	1,451	49.1	27.4	0.6	16.5	3.0	3.4	52.1	44.5
Nora-Hjulsjö	3.4	3,434	66.7	8.4	12.1	9.2	2.2	1.4	68.9	29.7
Nya Kopparberg	3.5	3,521	70.9	8.2	6.0	9.4	2.7	2.8	73.6	23.6
Sköllersta	3.5	3,550	43.0	10.5	17.1	28.9	0.1	0.3	43.2	56.5
Sundbo	3.7	3,742	64.2	5.4	22.0	7.5	0.5	0.4	64.7	34.9
Örebro	22.6	22,678	64.0	17.3	0.5	16.3	1.4	0.4	65.5	34.1
Örebro hundred	7.1	7,117	58.5	12.2	12.5	15.7	0.8	0.3	59.4	40.3
Postal vote	1.4	1,449								
Total	3.5	100,130	59.6	12.4	9.7	14.9	2.1	1.3	61.7	37.0
Source: SCB

=== Östergötland ===
Location	Share	Votes	S	AV	B	FP	K	Left	Right
Aska	5.1	7,712	70.0	10.2	8.6	7.5	3.7	73.7	26.3
Bankekind	3.9	5,807	61.4	10.7	16.2	11.0	0.7	62.1	37.9
Björkekind	1.2	1,761	44.9	20.6	29.1	5.4	0.0	44.9	55.1
Boberg	2.4	3,618	59.2	13.2	16.4	7.7	3.5	62.7	37.3
Bråbo	1.6	2,337	72.1	13.5	5.0	7.8	1.6	73.7	26.3
Dal	1.2	1,751	61.3	12.5	19.6	5.8	0.7	62.1	37.9
Finspånga län	8.4	12,645	66.1	11.8	13.0	8.5	0.6	66.7	33.2
Gullberg	2.0	2,981	63.4	10.9	17.2	6.3	2.2	65.5	34.5
Göstring	4.2	6,338	56.4	11.3	20.4	8.5	3.3	59.7	40.2
Hammarkind	4.7	7,030	53.5	18.1	19.8	7.6	1.0	54.5	45.5
Hanekind	2.2	3,373	57.3	18.2	16.5	7.6	0.4	57.8	42.2
Kinda	5.0	7,482	48.8	16.7	22.3	12.1	0.1	48.9	51.1
Linköping	11.4	17,121	58.7	24.6	1.3	11.3	4.1	62.8	37.2
Lysing	2.6	3,948	44.6	14.6	28.8	11.7	0.3	44.9	55.1
Lösing	1.4	2,167	63.2	16.6	14.2	4.4	1.7	64.8	35.2
Memming	1.6	2,414	74.1	11.6	6.0	6.3	1.9	76.0	24.0
Mjölby	2.1	3,171	68.4	17.2	2.0	12.0	0.4	68.7	31.3
Motala	2.1	3,134	51.3	31.0	0.6	13.7	3.4	54.7	45.3
Norrköping	23.0	34,643	65.9	24.4	0.7	6.6	2.3	68.2	31.8
Skänninge	0.6	860	51.9	27.3	5.6	14.8	0.5	52.3	47.7
Skärkind	1.4	2,098	53.5	15.7	24.2	6.5	0.1	53.7	46.3
Söderköping	0.9	1,392	51.5	29.4	3.8	15.3	0.0	51.5	48.5
Vadstena	1.1	1,580	53.5	29.4	1.6	14.6	0.8	54.4	45.6
Valkebo	2.1	3,123	52.5	15.2	22.1	10.1	0.0	52.5	47.4
Vifolka	2.2	3,251	53.3	15.0	21.2	7.6	2.9	56.2	43.7
Ydre	2.1	3,116	41.0	14.2	24.8	20.0	0.0	41.0	59.0
Åkerbo	0.8	1,276	41.6	23.6	26.6	7.8	0.3	41.9	58.1
Östkind	1.6	2,456	42.3	19.7	29.5	8.4	0.1	42.4	57.6
Postal vote	1.2	1,745							
Total	5.2	150,330	59.6	18.7	10.9	9.0	1.9	61.4	38.5
Source: SCB
