= Results of the 1936 Swedish general election =

Sweden 1936 election: General election

Sweden held a general election on 20 September 1936.

== Results ==
Party	Votes	%	Seats	+/–
Swedish Social Democratic Party	1,338,120	45.86	112	+8
General Electoral League	512,781	17.57	44	–14
Farmers' League	418,840	14.35	36	0
People's Party	376,161	12.89	27	+3
Socialist Party	127,832	4.38	6	0
Communist Party	96,519	3.31	5	+3
National League	26,750	0.92	0	New
National Socialist Workers' Party	17,483	0.60	0	New
Swedish National Socialist Party	3,025	0.10	0	0
Other parties	242	0.01	0	0
Total	2,917,753	100.00	230	0
Valid votes	2,917,753	99.73		
Invalid/blank votes	8,023	0.27		
Total votes	2,925,776	100.00		
Registered voters/turnout	3,924,598	74.55		
Source: Nohlen & Stöver, SCB

== Regional results ==
=== Percentage share ===
Location	Share	Votes	S	AV	B	FP	SP	K	Other	Left	Right
Götaland	49.8	1,451,665	44.4	19.4	18.7	11.2	1.6	2.8	1.9	48.8	49.3
Svealand	34.4	1,003,572	47.4	16.5	9.2	15.0	8.5	4.8	1.2	58.1	40.7
Norrland	15.9	462,516	47.3	14.1	12.0	13.6	4.2	7.1	1.6	58.7	39.7
Total	100.0	2,917,753	45.9	17.6	14.4	12.9	4.4	3.3	1.6	53.6	44.8
Source: SCB

=== By votes ===
Location	Share	Votes	S	AV	B	FP	SP	K	Other	Left	Right
Götaland	49.8	1,451,665	644,168	281,736	270,739	162,750	23,337	40,797	28,138	708,302	715,225
Svealand	34.4	1,003,572	475,214	165,723	92,765	150,467	84,887	22,720	11,796	582,821	408,955
Norrland	15.9	462,516	218,738	65,322	55,336	62,944	19,608	33,002	7,566	271,348	183,602
Total	100.0	2,917,753	1,338,120	512,781	418,840	376,161	127,832	96,519	47,500	1,562,471	1,307,782
Source: SCB

== Constituency results ==
=== Percentage share ===
Location	Land	Share	Votes	S	AV	B	FP	SP	K	Other	Left	Right	Margin
Location		%		%	%	%	%	%	%	%	%	%	
Blekinge	G	2.1	60,941	46.6	21.5	13.0	12.3	1.7	3.0	1.9	51.4	46.8	2,809
Bohuslän	G	3.1	90,989	41.9	23.1	16.9	11.2	1.5	3.5	1.8	46.9	51.2	3,903
Gothenburg	G	4.3	126,844	43.3	24.2	0.0	10.3	5.6	12.6	4.0	61.4	34.5	34,121
Gotland	G	1.0	28,222	32.8	13.8	37.9	13.1	0.3	0.4	1.7	33.5	64.8	8,827
Gävleborg	N	4.1	118,894	49.4	9.8	13.4	11.4	10.2	5.2	0.6	64.8	34.6	35,854
Halland	G	2.4	71,321	36.3	20.3	34.4	3.6	1.1	2.2	2.1	39.6	58.2	13,273
Jämtland	N	1.9	56,077	50.0	18.1	13.2	14.9	0.8	2.5	0.5	53.3	46.2	3,968
Jönköping	G	3.9	115,178	37.4	12.6	20.9	25.0	1.6	1.9	0.6	40.9	58.5	20,257
Kalmar	G	3.6	104,044	41.6	20.9	26.0	6.6	0.4	3.0	1.4	45.0	53.6	8,975
Kopparberg	S	3.8	110,643	47.4	8.6	13.1	17.0	12.1	1.4	0.4	60.9	38.7	24,513
Kristianstad	G	3.7	109,063	42.7	15.5	23.6	14.9	0.3	1.2	1.7	44.2	54.0	10,684
Kronoberg	G	2.4	70,426	36.5	21.3	27.4	8.3	1.8	3.6	1.1	41.9	57.0	10,606
Malmö area	G	4.5	130,644	62.5	22.3	1.7	6.7	0.8	1.2	4.8	64.5	30.7	44,191
Malmöhus	G	4.6	135,506	51.1	11.3	25.3	9.7	1.0	0.4	1.2	52.6	46.2	8,606
Norrbotten	N	2.5	74,072	40.2	14.9	9.1	6.5	0.7	22.2	6.4	63.1	30.5	24,186
Skaraborg	G	3.9	112,539	34.6	20.7	26.3	14.4	1.2	1.7	1.0	37.6	61.4	26,789
Stockholm	S	10.1	296,091	42.1	25.7	1.0	15.5	10.1	3.2	2.4	55.4	42.2	39,166
Stockholm County	S	4.4	129,368	46.8	18.0	9.6	13.1	9.2	2.1	1.2	58.1	40.7	22,515
Södermanland	S	3.2	93,310	55.6	11.8	12.4	15.2	4.2	0.6	0.2	60.4	39.4	19,585
Uppsala	S	2.2	64,347	42.8	14.8	17.3	15.1	9.0	0.5	0.5	52.3	47.2	3,283
Värmland	S	4.4	127,848	47.7	11.8	12.7	14.2	8.5	3.9	1.2	60.1	38.7	27,425
Västerbotten	N	3.0	86,829	38.9	19.3	9.8	28.6	0.8	1.8	0.8	41.5	57.6	13,972
Västernorrland	N	4.3	126,644	54.0	12.5	13.2	9.0	4.6	5.8	0.9	64.4	34.7	37,710
Västmanland	S	2.7	77,979	54.2	10.4	15.7	13.1	4.3	2.3	0.0	60.7	39.3	16,753
Älvsborg N	G	2.7	77,823	41.7	17.7	22.4	14.0	1.8	1.5	0.9	45.0	54.1	7,070
Älvsborg S	G	2.3	67,827	37.8	29.9	18.8	9.0	1.5	1.0	2.0	40.4	57.7	11,741
Örebro	S	3.6	103,986	52.7	12.7	11.4	15.6	5.7	1.3	0.6	59.6	39.8	20,626
Östergötland	G	5.2	150,298	53.8	19.0	13.1	8.6	1.9	2.1	1.5	57.7	40.8	25,475
Total		100.0	2,917,753	45.9	17.6	14.4	12.9	4.4	3.3	1.6	53.6	44.8	254,689
Source: SCB

=== By votes ===
Location	Land	Share	Votes	S	AV	B	FP	SP	K	Other	Left	Right	Margin
Location		%											
Blekinge	G	2.1	60,941	28,422	13,129	7,896	7,466	1,030	1,848	1,150	31,300	28,491	2,809
Bohuslän	G	3.1	90,989	38,169	20,988	15,400	10,223	1,382	3,157	1,670	42,708	46,611	3,903
Gothenburg	G	4.3	126,844	54,881	30,746		13,054	7,094	15,946	5,123	77,921	43,800	34,121
Gotland	G	1.0	28,222	9,249	3,900	10,698	3,683	89	116	487	9,454	18,281	8,827
Gävleborg	N	4.1	118,894	58,673	11,599	15,990	13,578	12,160	6,188	706	77,021	41,167	35,854
Halland	G	2.4	71,321	25,890	14,454	24,553	2,535	804	1,575	1,510	28,269	41,542	13,273
Jämtland	N	1.9	56,077	28,053	10,181	7,392	8,353	431	1,410	257	29,894	25,926	3,968
Jönköping	G	3.9	115,178	43,097	14,484	24,029	28,852	1,854	2,157	705	47,108	67,365	20,257
Kalmar	G	3.6	104,044	43,326	21,763	27,102	6,901	379	3,086	1,487	46,791	55,766	8,975
Kopparberg	S	3.8	110,643	52,418	9,550	14,439	18,851	13,404	1,531	450	67,353	42,840	24,513
Kristianstad	G	3.7	109,063	46,567	16,962	25,753	16,215	322	1,357	1,887	48,246	58,930	10,684
Kronoberg	G	2.4	70,426	25,740	14,979	19,300	5,853	1,238	2,548	768	29,526	40,132	10,606
Malmö area	G	4.5	130,644	81,648	29,093	2,255	8,754	1,096	1,549	6,249	84,293	40,102	44,191
Malmöhus	G	4.6	135,506	69,298	15,342	34,203	13,113	1,409	557	1,584	71,264	62,658	8,606
Norrbotten	N	2.5	74,072	29,797	11,034	6,761	4,771	545	16,410	4,754	46,752	22,566	24,186
Skaraborg	G	3.9	112,539	38,991	23,264	29,610	16,208	1,360	1,942	1,164	42,293	69,082	26,789
Stockholm	S	10.1	296,091	124,754	76,058	2,894	45,934	29,781	9,517	7,153	164,052	124,886	39,166
Stockholm County	S	4.4	129,368	60,537	23,235	12,408	17,013	11,924	2,710	1,541	75,171	52,656	22,515
Södermanland	S	3.2	93,310	51,916	11,030	11,541	14,221	3,910	551	141	56,377	36,792	19,585
Uppsala	S	2.2	64,347	27,545	9,499	11,144	9,729	5,763	347	320	33,655	30,372	3,283
Värmland	S	4.4	127,848	60,995	15,015	16,235	18,189	10,904	4,965	1,545	76,864	49,439	27,425
Västerbotten	N	3.0	86,829	33,812	16,735	8,493	24,806	651	1,599	733	36,062	50,034	13,972
Västernorrland	N	4.3	126,644	68,403	15,773	16,700	11,436	5,821	7,395	1,116	81,619	43,909	37,710
Västmanland	S	2.7	77,979	42,257	8,090	12,253	10,270	3,338	1,771		47,366	30,613	16,753
Älvsborg N	G	2.7	77,823	32,465	13,785	17,425	10,867	1,381	1,161	739	35,007	42,077	7,070
Älvsborg S	G	2.3	67,827	25,625	20,268	12,746	6,098	1,048	698	1,344	27,371	39,112	11,741
Örebro	S	3.6	103,986	54,792	13,246	11,851	16,260	5,863	1,328	646	61,983	41,357	20,626
Östergötland	G	5.2	150,298	80,800	28,579	19,769	12,928	2,851	3,100	2,271	86,751	61,276	25,475
Total		100.0	2,917,753	1,338,120	512,781	418,840	376,161	127,832	96,519	47,500	1,562,471	1,307,782	254,689
Source: SCB

== Results by city and district ==
=== Blekinge ===
Location	Share	Votes	S	AV	B	FP	SP	K	Left	Right
Bräkne	14.7	8,965	52.2	17.1	19.2	6.3	0.7	3.8	56.7	42.7
Karlshamn	6.7	4,088	46.6	30.1	1.8	12.9	0.3	3.8	50.8	48.6
Karlskrona	18.4	11,228	46.7	30.1	0.5	14.7	1.5	2.3	50.4	45.3
Lister	17.4	10,617	43.9	22.3	15.3	13.9	0.5	3.4	47.7	51.6
Medelstad	20.3	12,357	47.7	14.6	20.7	8.6	3.3	3.1	54.0	43.9
Ronneby	4.5	2,768	49.1	27.1	1.5	13.3	2.9	4.9	56.9	41.9
Sölvesborg	3.2	1,929	44.5	26.4	1.3	18.8	6.6	0.7	51.8	46.5
Östra	13.7	8,371	42.5	14.6	21.3	16.1	1.4	2.2	46.1	52.0
Postal vote	1.0	618								
Total	2.1	60,941	46.6	21.5	13.0	12.3	1.7	3.0	51.4	46.8
Source: SCB

=== Gothenburg and Bohuslän ===
==== Bohuslän ====
Location	Share	Votes	S	AV	B	FP	SP	K	Left	Right
Askim	9.7	8,822	39.9	27.5	10.5	12.5	2.5	4.4	46.8	50.5
Bullaren	1.1	1,036	17.1	20.4	51.4	9.5	0.7	0.5	18.2	81.2
Inlands Fräkne	2.2	2,001	28.8	29.4	25.8	13.4	0.0	0.2	29.0	68.7
Inlands Nordre	4.6	4,174	24.1	36.2	28.7	7.6	0.2	0.4	24.7	72.5
Inlands Södre	3.4	3,096	22.0	32.7	35.8	4.7	0.0	1.2	23.2	73.3
Inlands Torpe	2.2	2,010	55.2	11.8	27.9	2.7	0.0	2.2	57.4	42.4
Kungälv	1.6	1,452	56.8	28.7	2.5	9.4	0.1	1.9	58.8	40.6
Kville	2.8	2,532	31.1	12.8	33.7	19.3	0.6	2.2	34.0	65.8
Lane	3.3	3,046	29.8	20.5	31.4	17.1	0.1	0.3	30.2	68.9
Lysekil	3.1	2,817	54.6	28.9	0.1	7.3	0.2	7.6	62.5	36.3
Marstrand	0.6	515	37.5	36.3	0.0	17.3	0.2	7.6	45.0	53.6
Mölndal	8.3	7,568	55.0	9.8	2.3	6.4	5.9	16.4	77.4	18.6
Orust Västra	4.4	4,042	27.0	39.0	16.1	17.2	0.0	0.0	27.0	72.4
Orust Östra	2.0	1,824	28.5	24.4	29.9	16.3	0.0	0.2	28.7	70.7
Sotenäs	6.5	5,876	51.7	15.8	13.6	11.0	6.5	0.7	59.0	40.4
Strömstad	1.5	1,405	51.7	38.0	1.6	4.7	0.3	2.1	54.2	44.3
Stångenäs	4.4	3,978	59.6	25.7	5.9	6.6	0.1	1.0	60.6	38.2
Sävedal	5.5	5,048	47.1	14.7	12.7	10.0	2.6	9.3	59.0	37.4
Sörbygden	1.6	1,487	12.0	42.2	41.5	3.5	0.1	0.2	12.2	87.2
Tanum	3.3	3,017	28.3	30.3	28.9	10.6	0.1	0.5	28.9	69.9
Tjörn	3.1	2,776	10.2	26.8	26.5	34.9	0.0	0.3	10.6	88.2
Tunge	4.1	3,760	52.7	16.2	16.6	10.6	0.1	1.9	54.7	43.4
Uddevalla	8.5	7,693	59.0	20.2	0.6	16.8	0.8	0.9	60.7	37.7
Vette	5.0	4,529	55.8	9.0	29.4	3.5	0.4	0.6	56.8	41.9
Västra Hising	6.4	5,843	33.4	29.5	20.2	10.3	0.2	4.9	38.6	60.0
Östra Hising	0.5	484	30.6	9.9	45.2	5.4	1.4	3.7	35.7	60.5
Postal vote	0.2	158								
Total	3.1	90,989	41.9	23.1	16.9	11.2	1.5	3.5	46.9	51.2
Source: SCB

==== Gothenburg ====
Location	Share	Votes	S	AV	FP	SP	K	Left	Right
Gothenburg	100.0	126,844	43.3	24.2	10.3	5.6	12.6	61.4	34.5
Total	4.3	126,844	43.3	24.2	10.3	5.6	12.6	61.4	34.5
Source: SCB

=== Gotland ===
Location	Share	Votes	S	AV	B	FP	SP	K	Left	Right
Gotland Norra	40.6	11,454	34.6	8.8	45.4	7.8	0.5	0.6	35.8	62.0
Gotland Södra	39.9	11,260	21.1	9.8	47.5	20.4	0.1	0.1	21.3	77.7
Visby	19.3	5,457	52.8	32.5	2.9	9.0	0.3	0.4	53.6	44.4
Postal vote	0.2	51								
Total	1.0	28,222	32.8	13.8	37.9	13.1	0.3	0.4	33.5	64.8
Source: SCB

=== Gävleborg ===
Location	Share	Votes	S	AV	B	FP	SP	K	Left	Right
Ala	10.1	12,044	58.2	4.6	15.1	6.0	5.1	10.6	73.9	25.6
Bergsjö-Forsa	9.1	10,849	36.6	5.0	31.6	11.5	8.6	6.5	51.6	48.1
Bollnäs	12.7	15,108	46.8	6.5	18.1	14.5	6.0	7.8	60.6	39.1
Delsbo	3.4	3,999	37.0	8.5	42.4	5.4	5.2	1.1	43.2	56.2
Enånger	2.8	3,326	38.9	4.9	18.0	8.3	18.6	10.9	68.5	31.2
Gästrikland Västra	11.5	13,681	48.1	9.0	14.1	9.3	16.7	2.5	67.3	32.4
Gästrikland Östra	16.3	19,352	58.0	7.3	7.0	11.5	14.0	1.9	73.9	25.9
Gävle	15.1	17,988	57.7	17.9	0.1	16.5	5.7	0.7	64.1	34.5
Hudiksvall	2.8	3,294	29.9	24.5	2.7	17.1	15.8	9.2	54.9	44.3
Söderhamn	4.5	5,314	54.0	19.1	0.4	9.3	5.9	10.2	70.1	28.7
Västra Hälsingland	11.6	13,834	41.8	9.3	16.7	10.1	14.6	6.7	63.2	36.1
Postal vote	0.1	105								
Total	4.1	118,894	49.4	9.8	13.4	11.4	10.2	5.2	64.8	34.6
Source: SCB

=== Halland ===
Location	Share	Votes	S	AV	B	FP	SP	K	Left	Right
Falkenberg	3.8	2,699	47.4	31.7	4.9	7.3	5.7	1.6	54.7	43.9
Faurås	10.2	7,275	21.8	18.0	56.1	2.0	0.9	0.5	23.2	76.1
Fjäre	11.3	8,057	24.9	21.2	48.4	1.7	1.4	0.1	26.5	71.3
Halmstad	17.2	12,273	56.1	24.9	3.1	5.4	1.3	7.1	64.4	33.3
Halmstad Hundred	10.6	7,571	46.5	17.4	30.6	2.8	0.1	1.5	48.1	50.7
Himle	7.4	5,250	18.1	19.0	54.1	4.2	0.7	1.6	20.4	77.3
Hök	12.0	8,548	26.2	7.4	61.3	2.4	0.0	0.5	26.7	71.1
Kungsbacka	1.6	1,149	33.5	42.7	5.8	6.3	4.0	0.8	38.3	54.8
Laholm	1.8	1,280	43.1	25.4	19.4	3.4	0.2	0.3	43.7	48.2
Tönnersjö	7.2	5,163	44.0	14.4	35.4	2.3	0.2	3.4	47.6	52.1
Varberg	6.6	4,681	50.6	26.7	2.8	8.2	3.3	3.5	57.4	37.7
Viske	3.5	2,483	18.6	20.9	55.8	3.5	0.0	0.2	18.8	80.1
Årstad	6.8	4,855	28.3	25.5	41.4	1.1	1.1	0.2	29.6	68.1
Postal vote	0.1	37								
Total	2.4	71,321	36.3	20.3	34.4	3.6	1.1	2.2	39.6	58.2
Source: SCB

=== Jämtland ===
Location	Share	Votes	S	AV	B	FP	SP	K	Left	Right
Berg	4.7	2,616	49.1	17.3	12.6	17.3	0.9	1.4	51.4	47.2
Hammerdal	12.1	6,775	52.3	18.2	14.7	12.0	0.5	1.9	54.7	44.9
Hede	3.1	1,754	55.2	11.1	6.4	22.5	1.4	3.0	59.6	40.0
Lits-Rödön	14.7	8,244	44.5	14.6	19.8	17.6	1.1	2.2	47.9	52.0
Ragunda	12.2	6,863	64.8	14.7	11.9	6.7	0.6	0.9	66.4	33.3
Revsund-Brunflo-Näs	13.9	7,811	52.5	14.5	18.4	11.4	0.6	2.4	55.5	44.3
Sunne-Oviken-Hallen	8.3	4,672	38.9	18.7	20.5	19.5	0.4	1.5	40.8	58.7
Sveg	6.1	3,398	62.3	10.5	6.2	10.9	0.5	9.4	72.2	27.7
Undersåker-Offerdal	12.8	7,182	45.3	17.5	9.9	23.9	0.8	2.6	48.6	51.2
Östersund	12.0	6,728	42.1	36.6	2.8	13.3	1.1	2.7	45.9	52.6
Postal vote	0.1	34								
Total	1.9	56,077	50.0	18.1	13.2	14.9	0.8	2.5	53.3	46.2
Source: SCB

=== Jönköping ===
Location	Share	Votes	S	AV	B	FP	SP	K	Left	Right
Eksjö	3.0	3,505	42.7	27.4	1.6	23.3	0.8	0.5	44.0	52.3
Gränna	0.6	704	32.4	30.7	1.1	31.1	0.3	4.4	37.1	62.9
Huskvarna	3.9	4,530	60.9	7.3	0.4	23.0	0.4	7.7	69.1	30.7
Jönköping	14.3	16,492	50.7	19.2	0.7	25.8	0.6	1.8	53.1	45.7
Mo	2.8	3,188	15.8	6.1	29.5	48.1	0.1	0.0	15.9	83.7
Norra Vedbo	5.9	6,785	26.8	16.3	22.7	30.8	1.6	1.1	29.5	69.8
Nässjö	4.0	4,633	56.1	16.3	1.4	20.0	3.1	1.7	60.9	37.6
Södra Vedbo	6.2	7,183	33.9	9.7	33.8	19.6	1.3	0.9	36.1	63.1
Tranås	3.0	3,403	49.7	15.4	0.9	26.7	4.7	1.6	55.9	43.0
Tveta	9.2	10,617	43.7	7.0	18.0	28.9	0.5	1.6	45.8	53.9
Vetlanda	1.7	1,979	44.7	24.1	1.2	23.5	0.1	4.9	49.7	48.8
Vista	2.7	3,159	21.9	8.0	29.6	39.2	0.2	1.0	23.1	76.8
Värnamo	2.1	2,373	49.4	20.6	1.6	21.0	1.2	6.0	56.6	43.2
Västbo	13.6	15,690	33.1	10.6	38.2	13.2	3.5	1.2	37.9	62.0
Västra	10.5	12,150	24.9	8.0	37.4	26.0	1.9	1.7	28.5	71.4
Östbo	8.3	9,539	28.0	12.3	24.7	31.3	1.7	1.9	31.6	68.2
Östra	8.0	9,205	31.5	8.2	32.9	23.4	1.7	1.9	35.1	64.5
Postal vote	0.0	43								
Total	3.9	115,178	37.4	12.6	20.9	25.0	1.6	1.9	40.9	58.5
Source: SCB

=== Kalmar ===
Location	Share	Votes	S	AV	B	FP	SP	K	Left	Right
Algutsrum	2.6	2,729	35.8	28.1	30.8	2.2	0.0	0.1	35.9	61.1
Aspeland	6.6	6,880	44.3	14.8	28.0	11.4	0.1	1.3	45.7	54.2
Borgholm	1.0	1,008	46.4	31.9	4.2	17.2	0.0	0.0	46.4	53.3
Gräsgård	1.9	2,027	48.0	20.8	25.0	2.7	0.0	0.8	48.8	48.4
Handbörd	6.1	6,396	40.2	16.7	28.3	6.0	0.0	6.1	46.3	51.2
Kalmar	9.5	9,877	54.2	30.4	1.6	6.5	0.0	4.7	59.0	38.5
Möckleby	1.3	1,304	13.0	30.0	48.5	1.5	0.0	0.0	13.0	80.0
Norra Möre	4.9	5,062	42.8	22.7	28.4	3.1	0.0	0.8	43.5	54.2
Norra Tjust	7.3	7,617	45.9	17.7	30.2	4.2	0.1	0.8	46.9	52.2
Nybro	2.2	2,249	54.1	24.6	1.5	9.3	0.2	9.5	63.8	35.3
Oskarshamn	4.1	4,280	65.3	22.4	0.6	9.5	0.0	1.6	66.9	32.5
Runsten	1.7	1,808	10.8	13.2	69.2	1.9	0.0	0.0	10.8	84.3
Sevede	6.9	7,185	30.6	19.0	41.3	8.1	0.3	0.4	31.3	68.4
Slättbo	1,3	1,336	24.3	13.7	58.2	2.8	0.0	0.0	24.3	74.7
Stranda	6.1	6,331	45.4	18.8	20.4	6.4	0.0	8.1	53.7	45.6
Södra Möre	14.6	15,154	36.1	21.4	34.7	4.4	0.3	1.4	37.8	60.5
Södra Tjust	8.4	8,765	44.4	16.3	27.8	4.8	0.8	5.6	50.8	48.9
Tunalän	4.5	4,672	34.9	20.7	32.4	8.4	0.0	3.0	37.9	61.5
Vimmerby	1.6	1,672	39.1	35.1	5.9	16.9	0.4	1.9	41.3	57.8
Västervik	4.6	4,834	44.2	29.3	1.2	13.7	4.3	5.8	54.3	44.3
Åkerbo	2.6	2,746	24.1	4.7	63.3	7.3	0.0	0.4	24.5	75.2
Postal vote	0.1	112								
Total	3.6	104,044	41.6	20.9	26.0	6.6	0.4	3.0	45.0	53.6
Source: SCB

=== Kopparberg ===
Location	Share	Votes	S	AV	B	FP	SP	K	Left	Right
Avesta	2.6	2,833	55.5	7.1	0.5	12.6	24.0	0.3	79.7	20.2
Falu Norra	8.1	8,954	43.3	6.0	12.4	22.2	15.0	0.8	59.1	40.6
Falu Södra	13.4	14,853	51.5	5.9	14.2	12.4	14.5	1.3	67.4	32.5
Falun	5.7	6,292	43.7	26.2	0.6	24.0	4.1	1.0	48.8	50.7
Folkare	6.4	7,126	45.0	6.9	20.5	13.0	11.8	2.7	59.5	40.4
Hedemora	1.8	1,970	43.6	20.5	4.3	27.2	3.4	1.0	47.9	51.9
Hedemora ting	7.9	8,753	47.6	4.6	30.7	9.7	6.1	1.1	54.9	45.1
Leksand-Gagnef	9.5	10,507	41.5	7.6	19.3	25.2	5.9	0.2	47.6	52.2
Ludvika	2.7	2,947	56.1	18.4	0.3	12.2	11.6	1.1	68.8	31.0
Malung	5.8	6,387	57.1	8.0	6.0	22.0	5.3	1.2	63.7	36.1
Mora	6.2	6,907	40.7	7.3	17.1	22.9	8.9	2.0	51.7	47.3
Nås	6.4	7,125	46.3	8.6	12.4	11.9	18.5	1.1	65.9	32.9
Orsa	3.1	3,390	45.8	11.5	15.5	15.1	10.4	1.2	57.3	42.1
Rättvik	4.4	4,866	35.8	9.7	12.5	26.9	11.2	3.8	50.8	49.1
Särna-Idre	0.9	1,021	55.7	4.9	3.4	24.9	10.4	0.0	66.1	33.2
Säter	1.0	1,076	54.8	16.0	2.0	19.1	8.1	0.0	62.9	37.1
Västerbergslag	12.0	13,257	55.3	6.0	6.7	10.2	19.5	2.1	76.9	22.8
Älvdalen	2.1	2,347	33.0	5.5	16.2	15.3	25.5	1.0	59.4	36.9
Postal vote	0.0	32								
Total	3.8	110,643	47.4	8.6	13.1	17.0	12.1	1.4	60.9	38.7
Source: SCB

=== Kristianstad ===
Location	Share	Votes	S	AV	B	FP	SP	K	Left	Right
Albo	3.7	4,078	29.6	13.8	22.6	29.6	1.7	1.3	32.6	66.0
Bjäre	6.1	6,636	34.6	17.3	39.3	6.1	0.2	0.0	34.7	62.6
Gärd	9.3	10,154	47.7	10.3	18.2	22.0	0.1	1.1	48.9	50.5
Hässleholm	1.6	1,733	50.0	29.5	2.2	14.5	0.2	1.0	51.2	46.2
Ingelstad	10.7	11,707	38.5	11.0	23.6	25.2	0.3	0.0	38.9	59.8
Järrestad	3.8	4,145	44.4	11.2	23.2	19.9	0.1	0.6	45.0	54.3
Kristianstad	6.3	6,860	45.2	31.9	2.4	17.0	0.0	1.1	46.3	51.2
Norra Åsbo	12.0	13,035	40.8	17.6	32.3	7.1	0.6	0.3	41.7	56.9
Simrishamn	1.2	1,327	50.0	35.4	0.5	11.8	0.0	1.3	51.2	47.8
Södra Åsbo	6.6	7,201	51.4	10.2	31.0	4.3	0.1	0.6	52.1	45.5
Villand	9.6	10,455	52.7	11.5	18.6	12.9	0.3	3.1	56.1	42.9
Västra Göinge	14.5	15,862	33.6	16.0	32.2	15.9	0.0	0.7	34.3	64.1
Ängelholm	2.7	2,942	57.6	26.6	4.4	2.7	0.0	0.0	57.6	33.7
Östra Göinge	11.7	12,811	44.1	13.2	22.0	14.3	0.6	4.0	48.7	49.5
Postal vote	0.1	117								
Total	3.7	109,063	42.7	15.5	23.6	14.9	0.3	1.2	44.2	54.0
Source: SCB

=== Kronoberg ===
Location	Share	Votes	S	AV	B	FP	SP	K	Left	Right
Allbo	18.3	12,910	37.6	24.2	27.9	6.9	0.9	1.4	39.9	59.1
Kinnevald	9.7	6,825	31.4	31.3	25.8	5.7	1.7	3.0	36.1	62.8
Konga	19.6	13,816	39.5	19.5	26.4	6.6	2.4	4.7	46.6	52.5
Ljungby	3.2	2,274	42.1	25.3	6.6	19.2	1.3	4.5	47.9	51.2
Norrvidinge	5.3	3,708	33.7	21.0	38.8	4.6	0.6	0.9	35.2	64.4
Sunnerbo	21.0	14,788	26.5	18.6	39.1	11.6	1.1	1.7	29.3	69.3
Uppvidinge	16.5	11,633	46.0	12.7	24.4	5.6	3.4	7.3	56.8	42.7
Växjö	6.3	4,445	40.2	31.9	1.8	15.5	1.6	5.8	47.6	49.2
Postal vote	0.0	27								
Total	2.4	70,426	36.5	21.3	27.4	8.3	1.8	3.6	41.9	57.0
Source: SCB

=== Malmöhus ===
==== Malmö area ====
Location	Share	Votes	S	AV	B	FP	SP	K	Left	Right
Hälsingborg	23.0	30,060	59.2	24.3	1.6	4.3	2.1	0.6	61.9	30.2
Landskrona	8.0	10,450	69.9	16.0	0.6	9.0	0.8	1.7	72.4	25.6
Lund	11.1	14,437	54.1	26.3	2.1	9.3	0.1	0.9	55.1	37.8
Malmö	57.8	75,513	64.4	21.5	1.9	6.9	0.5	1.4	66.3	30.2
Postal vote	0.1	184								
Total	4.5	130,644	62.5	22.3	1.7	6.7	0.8	1.2	64.5	30.7
Source: SCB

==== Malmöhus County ====
Location	Share	Votes	S	AV	B	FP	SP	K	Left	Right
Bara	7.9	10,700	60.8	10.9	21.4	4.3	0.8	0.4	62.0	36.6
Eslöv	2.4	3,274	57.6	24.1	3.3	12.6	0.2	1.2	59.0	39.9
Frosta	8.8	11,871	32.5	11.2	27.7	26.5	1.4	0.1	34.0	65.4
Färs	8.0	10,841	34.0	7.5	29.2	27.1	0.9	0.1	35.0	63.7
Harjager	4.8	6,563	52.8	11.7	30.3	3.5	1.0	0.2	54.0	45.5
Herrestad	2.6	3,482	54.7	5.7	25.6	13.6	0.1	0.0	54.8	44.9
Höganäs	2.8	3,735	75.5	12.4	3.3	5.4	0.3	0.0	75.9	21.1
Ljunit	2.2	2,943	49.4	5.3	35.1	9.5	0.3	0.0	49.8	49.9
Luggude	14.2	19,191	53.3	11.0	27.1	4.2	0.4	0.9	54.6	42.3
Onsjö	5.7	7,698	47.2	12.9	23.2	3.6	0.5	0.3	48.1	51.6
Oxie	6.6	8,945	59.2	8.8	26.0	3.7	1.6	0.2	61.1	38.5
Rönneberg	4.2	5,704	59.0	12.9	23.2	3.6	0.2	0.2	59.3	39.7
Skanör-Falsterbo	0.4	482	24.3	45.9	13.3	12.0	0.0	0.0	24.3	71.2
Skytt	5.0	6,841	48.8	10.4	33.3	4.2	2.2	0.3	51.2	47.9
Torna	7.8	10,555	51.8	9.3	33.0	4.3	0.5	0.3	52.6	46.6
Trälleborg	4.8	6,452	59.4	19.2	2.4	11.3	4.9	2.2	66.5	33.0
Vemmenhög	7.5	10,226	46.9	8.0	35.1	9.0	0.7	0.1	47.8	52.1
Ystad	4.3	5,874	61.4	20.9	0.8	14.1	1.6	0.1	63.1	35.9
Postal vote	0.1	129								
Total	4.6	135,506	51.1	11.3	25.3	9.7	1.0	0.4	52.6	46.2
Source: SCB

=== Norrbotten ===
Location	Share	Votes	S	AV	B	FP	SP	K	Left	Right
Arjeplog	1.2	903	32.2	20.7	1.8	11.2	0.0	34.9	67.1	31.5
Arvidsjaur	4.4	3,272	41.7	14.9	2.6	10.1	0.5	28.3	70.4	27.6
Boden	4.0	2,943	38.9	17.9	0.1	8.7	1.8	8.1	48.8	26.8
Gällivare	8.5	6,332	35.5	21.5	1.2	1.6	0.2	33.1	68.8	24.2
Haparanda	1.3	939	24.6	34.4	1.2	3.2	0.0	15.5	40.1	38.8
Jokkmokk	2.8	2,092	34.7	13.9	1.0	8.1	2.7	33.5	70.8	22.9
Jukkasjärvi	7.8	5,806	37.0	11.3	0.4	6.5	6.0	33.9	76.9	18.2
Karesuando	0.2	145	15.9	71.0	0.7	2.8	0.0	4.8	20.7	74.5
Luleå	8.2	6,067	37.8	19.2	0.4	6.5	0.0	23.1	61.0	26.1
Nederkalix	10.2	7,529	47.7	11.5	12.0	7.0	0.3	15.2	63.2	30.4
Nederluleå	5.8	4,264	23.9	22.6	22.0	15.7	0.0	10.2	34.1	60.2
Pajala	4.7	3,518	31.6	22.1	7.1	2.3	0.1	31.1	62.8	31.5
Piteå	1.9	1,375	50.8	28.7	1.3	4.4	0.0	5.5	56.3	34.5
Piteå-Älvsby	16.7	12,355	58.8	7.9	14.9	2.5	0.1	14.4	73.3	25.3
Råneå	4.9	3,635	35.5	9.8	10.6	8.8	0.0	26.1	61.6	29.2
Torneå	6.9	5,105	35.8	14.7	19.0	4.8	0.0	22.5	58.3	38.5
Överkalix	3.8	2,814	38.8	4.2	21.2	4.7	0.0	28.0	66.8	30.1
Överluleå	6.6	4,886	28.8	15.1	12.3	14.0	0.5	24.1	53.3	41.5
Postal vote	0.1	92								
Total	2.5	74,072	40.2	14.9	9.1	6.5	0.7	22.2	63.1	30.5
Source: SCB

=== Skaraborg ===
Location	Share	Votes	S	AV	B	FP	SP	K	Left	Right
Barne	5.1	5,767	15.6	32.0	35.2	15.2	0.5	0.9	17.0	82.4
Falköping	3.8	4,254	49.4	27.8	2.1	17.8	0.9	1.2	51.5	47.6
Frökind	1.0	1,142	11.2	33.3	44.1	10.6	0.0	0.1	11.3	88.0
Gudhem	3.7	4,199	32.3	15.8	40.7	9.7	0.2	0.9	33.4	66.1
Hjo	1.4	1,607	38.4	32.7	3.1	23.5	0.7	0.4	39.5	59.2
Kinne	5.0	5,592	41.0	14.2	14.8	23.7	3.2	1.8	46.0	52.6
Kinnefjärding	2.8	3,109	27.9	18.3	34.0	17.7	0.5	0.8	29.2	70.1
Kåkind	6.3	7,081	33.3	15.8	32.1	14.4	2.4	1.6	37.2	62.3
Kålland	4.8	5,359	25.7	17.3	27.1	26.1	1.5	0.5	27.7	70.5
Laske	2.4	2,684	15.2	26.0	41.8	13.6	1.5	0.5	17.2	81.4
Lidköping	4.5	5,035	50.4	22.7	0.3	11.8	4.3	9.3	64.1	34.8
Mariestad	2.8	3,199	44.7	27.3	1.1	16.8	0.8	7.2	52.6	45.2
Skara	3.1	3,487	42.5	30.3	4.1	19.1	2.4	0.8	45.7	53.4
Skåning	4.8	5,363	22.8	19.9	42.8	13.1	0.4	0.4	23.6	75.8
Skövde	5.0	5,573	44.1	30.3	4.3	14.7	0.6	4.7	49.3	49.4
Tidaholm	2.1	2,381	66.1	12.5	0.3	10.9	5.1	4.9	76.1	23.7
Vadsbo	20.0	22,556	39.1	16.2	30.7	11.5	0.5	1.0	40.6	58.3
Valle	2.1	2,325	42.8	16.8	25.5	12.3	0.3	0.3	43.5	54.6
Vartofta	10.6	11,915	33.3	13.8	38.6	12.0	1.0	0.3	34.7	64.5
Vilske	2.4	2,699	16.6	25.7	46.2	8.8	0.2	0.1	16.8	80.7
Viste	4.2	4,722	17.8	33.5	31.9	13.4	0.8	2.0	20.5	78.8
Åse	2.1	2,418	32.2	18.7	36.8	10.2	0.7	0.5	33.4	65.7
Postal vote	0.1	72								
Total	3.9	112,539	34.6	20.7	26.3	14.4	1.2	1.7	37.6	61.4
Source: SCB

=== Stockholm ===
==== Stockholm ====
Location	Share	Votes	S	AV	B	FP	SP	K	Left	Right
Stockholm	100.0	296,091	42.1	25.7	1.0	15.5	10.1	3.1	55.4	42.2
Total	10.1	296,091	42.1	25.7	1.0	15.5	10.1	3.2	55.4	42.2
Source: SCB

==== Stockholm County ====
Location	Share	Votes	S	AV	B	FP	SP	K	Left	Right
Bro-Vätö	1.2	1,549	36.7	27.1	18.4	11.1	4.7	0.2	41.6	56.6
Danderyd	12.9	16,653	47.6	18.2	1.8	15.9	11.0	3.9	62.5	36.0
Djursholm	2.4	3,110	28.4	49.5	1.5	15.6	1.8	0.4	30.5	66.6
Frösåker	4.1	5,291	38.5	12.8	30.5	7.0	8.1	2.0	48.6	50.3
Frötuna-Länna	2.2	2,899	30.2	30.3	23.9	13.3	0.7	0.2	31.1	67.4
Färentuna	2.6	3,307	50.1	7.9	24.3	10.4	5.4	1.4	56.9	42.5
Lidingö	4.1	5,354	35.1	34.2	1.3	18.6	7.0	1.2	43.4	54.1
Lyhundra	1.4	1,865	29.4	25.8	27.8	11.0	3.2	1.6	34.3	64.7
Långhundra	1.3	1,728	36.5	13.5	35.7	12.4	1.4	0.4	38.4	61.6
Norrtälje	2.1	2,721	44.8	33.7	1.1	14.7	1.7	3.1	49.5	49.5
Närdinghundra	2.8	3,631	42.4	11.2	26.6	10.5	7.5	1.2	51.1	48.3
Seminghundra	1.2	1,609	34.6	15.0	36.9	10.5	1.2	0.7	36.5	62.3
Sigtuna	0.4	575	43.0	28.3	2.8	21.9	3.1	0.0	46.1	53.0
Sjuhundra	1.7	2,257	42.8	18.9	13.9	13.6	6.2	4.1	53.1	46.3
Sollentuna	11.2	14,540	55.1	13.5	2.9	14.6	10.6	2.1	67.8	31.0
Sotholm	6.8	8,796	50.7	11.6	14.6	11.5	9.6	1.6	62.0	37.6
Sundbyberg	3.5	4,483	58.5	6.7	0.5	13.3	16.0	4.1	78.7	20.5
Svartlösa	13.2	17,093	49.3	17.2	3.0	12.4	13.3	2.8	65.5	32.6
Södertälje	6.0	7,819	54.9	20.7	0.8	10.4	11.0	1.2	67.2	31.9
Vallentuna	2.3	3,018	47.0	13.7	16.5	10.3	10.7	0.7	58.4	40.5
Vaxholm	0.9	1,215	39.9	20.4	5.3	26.3	6.3	0.9	47.2	52.1
Väddö-Häverö	3.2	4,089	35.8	17.9	16.7	10.4	15.8	1.6	53.1	45.0
Värmdö	3.3	4,317	54.7	15.9	5.3	14.8	6.5	2.3	63.4	36.0
Åker	2.1	2,698	43.4	12.5	23.0	14.4	5.3	1.1	49.7	49.9
Ärlinghundra	2.2	2,882	46.5	10.1	26.9	11.7	3.7	0.8	50.9	48.7
Öknebo	3.5	4,572	53.1	16.4	7.7	9.4	11.6	1.5	66.2	33.6
Öregrund	0.4	501	36.3	30.7	1.8	25.7	5.4	0.0	41.7	58.3
Östhammar	0.5	638	39.3	33.9	3.1	21.2	1.6	0.0	40.9	58.2
Postal vote	0.1	158								
Total	4.4	129,368	46.8	18.0	9.6	13.1	9.2	2.1	58.1	40.7
Source:SCB

=== Södermanland ===
Location	Share	Votes	S	AV	B	FP	SP	K	Left	Right
Daga	3.9	3,624	39.4	14.8	19.9	20.8	5.1	0.0	44.5	55.4
Eskilstuna	21.0	19,611	70.1	11.1	1.1	11.7	5.1	0.8	75.9	23.8
Hölebo	2.9	2,712	47.7	7.5	26.5	10.4	6.9	0.9	55.5	44.5
Jönåker	9.6	8,936	55.1	8.6	16.6	10.7	8.6	0.4	64.1	35.9
Katrineholm	4.5	4,215	62.3	12.6	0.9	21.2	2.3	0.6	65.3	34.7
Mariefred	0.8	777	44.0	30.8	0.8	23.3	0.9	0.3	45.2	54.8
Nyköping	6.4	5,954	56.1	23.1	0.8	12.3	6.1	1.2	63.5	36.2
Oppunda	16.0	14,920	52.1	7.7	16.0	21.5	1.9	0.7	54.7	45.2
Rönö	5.0	4,675	45.6	9.4	26.0	15.4	2.9	0.5	49.0	50.9
Selebo	3.0	2,820	50.6	11.5	23.5	9.8	4.3	0.4	55.2	44.7
Strängnäs	2.8	2,588	41.4	36.0	1.7	18.8	0.4	0.6	42.4	56.5
Torshälla	1.1	1,054	64.0	16.4	3.9	11.6	3.7	0.4	68.1	31.9
Trosa	0.5	476	43.7	43.9	1.3	9.9	1.1	0.2	45.0	55.0
Villåttinge	8.4	7,794	52.1	11.1	15.6	15.1	5.4	0.5	58.0	41.8
Västerrekarne	4.3	3,979	47.6	7.2	23.7	18.7	2.6	0.1	50.3	49.7
Åker	3.9	3,619	57.0	8.8	19.1	12.0	2.7	0.1	59.9	39.8
Österrekarne	5.9	5,526	52.5	8.9	19.9	16.7	1.5	0.3	54.3	45.6
Postal vote	0.0	30								
Total	3.2	93,310	55.6	11.8	12.4	15.2	4.2	0.6	60.4	39.4
Source: SCB

=== Uppsala ===
Location	Share	Votes	S	AV	B	FP	SP	K	Left	Right
Bro	2.1	1,323	57.6	13.0	17.5	6.6	4.7	0.2	62.4	37.0
Bälinge	2.5	1,618	19.7	10.1	46.3	12.4	10.8	0.4	30.8	68.7
Enköping	4.6	2,981	49.8	26.1	2.3	16.1	3.5	0.9	54.1	44.5
Hagunda	3.2	2,063	36.0	11.3	34.5	12.6	4.2	0.9	41.1	58.4
Håbo	2.9	1,841	52.4	19.5	15.2	9.1	3.4	0.0	55.8	43.7
Lagunda	2.6	1,654	38.2	11.5	35.1	12.9	1.3	0.0	39.5	59.5
Norunda	3.8	2,442	24.7	10.0	29.7	21.0	14.0	0.3	39.1	60.8
Oland	13.9	8,918	33.3	7.4	25.4	19.4	13.6	0.8	47.7	52.2
Rasbo	2.5	1,580	39.2	9.8	27.9	14.8	8.1	0.1	47.3	52.5
Trögd	5.2	3,369	39.1	13.7	35.3	8.7	2.9	0.1	42.1	57.7
Ulleråker	5.0	3,245	43.5	10.4	14.9	15.0	14.4	0.5	58.4	40.3
Uppsala	26.7	17,182	41.6	26.4	1.3	19.3	10.0	0.7	52.3	47.0
Vaksala	3.3	2,128	42.7	11.7	22.7	11.0	9.5	1.1	53.3	45.3
Åsunda	3.2	2,040	33.9	13.7	43.0	5.4	3.1	0.1	37.2	62.1
Örbyhus	18.5	11,923	58.5	5.5	15.4	11.8	8.4	0.4	67.3	32.7
Postal vote	0.1	40								
Total	2.2	64,347	42.8	14.8	17.3	15.1	9.0	0.5	52.3	47.2
Source: SCB

=== Värmland ===
Location	Share	Votes	S	AV	B	FP	SP	K	Left	Right
Arvika	2.9	3,763	43.3	16.1	0.2	20.8	12.9	4.4	60.6	37.1
Filipstad	1.9	2,484	48.3	20.8	0.7	19.0	2.2	5.8	56.3	40.5
Fryksdal	11.5	14,646	37.0	14.8	20.8	15.0	6.1	4.8	48.0	50.6
Färnebo	6.8	8,671	66.8	6.1	3.0	8.4	9.8	5.6	82.2	17.4
Gillberg	4.7	6,022	45.5	11.3	19.0	13.1	9.6	1.0	56.1	43.4
Grums	4.3	5,494	57.3	6.4	17.0	7.8	5.5	5.8	68.6	31.2
Jösse	9.5	12,205	45.7	12.3	13.6	15.8	8.4	3.2	57.3	41.7
Karlstad	9.7	12,394	48.0	19.7	1.0	17.1	9.2	2.6	59.8	37.8
Karlstad Hundred	4.9	6,325	62.5	8.0	5.9	9.7	10.0	3.6	76.1	23.5
Kil	7.6	9,655	49.8	7.1	15.8	13.0	12.9	0.9	63.5	36.0
Kristinehamn	5.1	6,582	58.7	16.2	0.1	18.4	4.6	0.8	64.1	34.7
Nordmark	6.2	7,867	33.2	12.9	22.6	23.6	4.8	1.9	39.9	59.1
Nyed	2.2	2,812	43.7	10.9	22.7	15.6	3.4	2.2	49.3	49.3
Näs	5.2	6,639	35.3	13.3	28.0	10.4	9.1	1.7	46.1	51.7
Visnum	2.5	3,146	40.7	7.6	23.5	14.9	8.5	2.7	51.8	46.0
Väse	2.7	3,431	37.8	9.1	28.7	20.1	2.0	1.5	41.3	57.8
Älvdal	10.9	13,932	52.6	7.1	5.7	8.5	14.0	11.1	77.7	21.3
Ölme	1.4	1,739	46.6	12.5	19.4	18.6	1.6	0.2	48.4	50.5
Postal vote	0.0	41								
Total	4.4	127,848	47.7	11.8	12.7	14.2	8.5	3.9	60.1	38.7
Source: SCB

=== Västerbotten ===
Location	Share	Votes	S	AV	B	FP	SP	K	Left	Right
Burträsk	4.7	4,040	22.2	29.1	16.2	31.4	0.2	0.3	22.6	76.6
Degerfors	5.0	4,354	36.8	18.2	3.9	40.5	0.3	0.2	37.3	62.6
Lycksele	11.3	9,837	36.9	15.6	2.4	42.0	0.6	2.4	39.8	59.9
Nordmaling-Bjurholm	9.8	8,484	39.6	17.6	14.8	26.1	0.2	0.3	40.0	58.5
Norsjö-Malå	4.9	4,282	37.6	15.0	1.4	40.3	1.8	2.3	41.6	56.7
Nysätra	8.4	7,288	28.7	21.6	17.5	30.7	0.5	0.2	29.4	69.9
Skellefteå	4.0	3,485	47.0	28.0	1.3	15.9	0.8	5.2	53.0	45.1
Skellefteå ting	20.7	17,992	40.0	24.6	10.3	21.2	0.4	3.3	43.7	56.1
Umeå	6.0	5,253	43.7	29.9	1.4	20.3	0.2	0.9	44.8	51.6
Umeå ting	14.8	12,827	36.6	14.7	16.9	27.8	2.1	1.5	40.2	59.4
Vilhelmina	6.8	5,896	55.4	6.5	7.0	26.8	1.1	2.7	59.3	40.3
Åsele	3.5	3,003	49.0	8.7	10.0	29.1	0.6	0.6	50.2	47.8
Postal vote	0.1	88								
Total	3.0	86,829	38.9	19.3	9.8	28.6	0.8	1.8	41.5	57.6
Source: SCB

=== Västernorrland ===
Location	Share	Votes	S	AV	B	FP	SP	K	Left	Right
Boteå	5.5	6,998	62.1	8.4	14.8	3.0	6.5	4.8	73.4	26.3
Fjällsjö	4.1	5,154	56.5	10.7	19.0	2.6	1.8	8.9	67.2	32.2
Härnösand	4.4	5,616	45.2	32.0	0.9	12.8	2.0	3.2	50.5	45.7
Medelpad Västra	12.7	16,089	52.3	6.8	18.5	10.6	5.5	5.7	63.5	35.9
Medelpad Östra	20.9	26,421	60.3	5.9	7.4	7.5	10.5	7.8	78.6	20.9
Ramsele-Resele	4.9	6,166	58.3	11.0	24.6	2.5	0.7	2.5	61.5	38.0
Sollefteå	1.0	1,305	40.8	40.9	6.3	8.5	0.1	0.5	41.5	55.7
Sollefteå ting	4.0	5,039	65.4	10.4	14.0	2.1	0.5	6.5	72.5	26.5
Sundsvall	6.6	8,346	41.9	33.5	1.2	13.5	4.7	2.2	48.8	48.2
Ångermanland Norra	16.6	21,000	50.9	14.0	16.9	14.8	0.7	2.3	53.9	45.6
Ångermanland Södra	17.2	21,748	52.8	8.4	17.0	7.1	4.1	10.1	67.0	32.5
Örnsköldsvik	2.0	2,572	40.6	32.7	1.2	21.0	0.7	2.2	43.4	54.9
Postal vote	0.2	190								
Total	4.3	126,644	54.0	12.5	13.2	9.0	4.6	5.8	64.4	34.7
Source: SCB

=== Västmanland ===
Location	Share	Votes	S	AV	B	FP	SP	K	Left	Right
Arboga	3.1	2,404	58.3	21.8	1.2	16.8	1.7	0.1	60.1	39.9
Gamla Norberg	10.3	8,023	66.4	9.1	6.5	8.6	8.6	0.7	75.8	24.2
Köping	4.5	3,514	56.4	15.1	7.6	14.9	4.4	1.7	62.5	37.5
Norrbo	3.7	2,871	59.6	3.7	26.4	9.2	0.7	0.5	60.7	39.3
Sala	5.0	3,912	43.1	22.1	6.3	15.8	8.9	3.8	55.8	44.2
Siende	3.3	2,611	62.4	5.0	15.7	10.8	3.8	1.2	67.4	32.6
Simtuna	5.5	4,301	35.9	11.0	33.5	13.9	3.3	2.3	41.5	58.5
Skinnskatteberg	3.4	2,666	61.2	5.9	9.8	9.9	7.5	5.8	74.5	25.5
Snevringe	12.8	10,000	64.0	5.8	13.9	8.8	2.9	4.5	71.5	28.5
Torstuna	2.7	2,118	32.0	13.7	25.1	12.8	9.5	6.9	48.4	51.6
Tuhundra	1.4	1,111	47.9	2.7	35.0	11.4	2.4	0.5	50.9	49.1
Vagnsbro	2.1	1,602	30.2	1.8	47.6	19.9	0.1	0.5	30.8	69.2
Våla	4.9	3,802	28.6	5.3	32.5	25.3	7.4	0.9	36.9	63.1
Västerås	21.3	16,582	62.0	15.9	1.2	16.1	2.4	2.5	66.8	33.2
Yttertjurbo	1.5	1,151	43.5	5.7	37.2	11.4	0.7	1.5	45.7	54.3
Åkerbo	10.5	8,192	54.0	6.7	22.6	10.8	4.5	1.4	59.9	40.1
Övertjurbo	3.9	3,075	30.4	5.8	48.8	12.3	2.2	0.4	33.0	67.0
Postal vote	0.1	44								
Total	2.7	77,979	54.2	10.4	15.7	13.1	4.3	2.3	60.7	39.3
Source: SCB

=== Älvsborg ===
==== Älvsborg N ====
Location	Share	Votes	S	AV	B	FP	SP	K	Left	Right
Ale	8.5	6,585	46.5	11.9	29.6	7.9	0.1	3.4	49.9	49.4
Alingsås	5.1	3,956	50.0	22.2	0.6	21.5	2.9	1.0	53.9	44.2
Bjärke	2.7	2,064	22.5	20.9	22.4	32.3	0.0	1.4	23.9	75.6
Flundre	4.3	3,347	61.4	10.0	18.9	4.6	0.1	4.6	66.2	33.5
Gäsene	5.4	4,203	11.6	34.7	33.7	17.4	1.6	0.0	13.2	85.8
Kulling	9.5	7,368	23.9	22.4	21.9	29.9	0.5	0.4	24.9	74.2
Nordal	5.7	4,464	40.3	13.6	33.6	9.7	1.4	0.1	41.8	56.9
Sundal	6.7	5,207	13.5	20.0	59.6	5.8	0.4	0.0	14.0	85.3
Trollhättan	8.2	6,388	72.2	13.1	0.7	9.7	2.6	1.3	76.2	23.5
Tössbo	3.7	2,848	34.5	16.1	31.7	12.1	4.0	0.6	39.1	60.0
Valbo	5.6	4,362	33.4	21.3	38.7	5.0	0.3	0.0	33.6	65.0
Vedbo	11.4	8,847	43.4	9.1	24.7	16.6	3.6	2.1	49.1	50.4
Väne	7.4	5,738	54.6	11.0	19.9	9.3	1.7	3.1	59.4	40.2
Vänersborg	5.1	3,940	50.2	28.6	0.8	12.8	4.6	0.8	55.5	42.1
Vättle	6.8	5,261	44.1	19.6	13.5	16.6	1.7	3.0	48.7	49.8
Åmål	4.1	3,207	56.8	23.9	0.6	13.8	2.6	0.6	60.1	38.4
Postal vote	0.0	38								
Total	2.7	77,823	41.1	17.7	22.4	14.0	1.8	1.5	45.0	54.1
Source: SCB

==== Älvsborg S ====
Location	Share	Votes	S	AV	B	FP	SP	K	Left	Right
Bollebygd	4.5	3,023	36.3	32.9	15.9	9.5	0.3	1.6	38.2	58.3
Borås	28.9	19,588	54.1	27.9	0.8	9.5	2.2	1.6	59.2	38.3
Kind	19.9	13,483	27.8	29.1	32.9	9.1	0.3	0.0	28.1	71.0
Mark	23.6	16,026	40.3	31.2	20.2	3.4	2.1	1.1	43.6	54.8
Redväg	7.0	4,781	14.2	20.9	43.5	17.7	0.2	0.0	14.4	82.1
Ulricehamn	3.5	2,371	40.5	33.5	1.5	22.9	0.9	0.0	41.4	57.9
Veden	4.7	3,211	23.5	42.5	19.9	10.2	0.6	1.3	25.3	72.7
Ås	7.8	5,323	24.8	32.3	31.4	8.7	0.7	0.0	25.5	72.3
Postal vote	0.0	21								
Total	2.3	67,827	37.8	29.9	18.8	9.0	1.5	1.0	40.4	57.7
Source: SCB

=== Örebro ===
Location	Share	Votes	S	AV	B	FP	SP	K	Left	Right
Asker	3.9	4,064	37.1	10.9	21.8	28.0	1.9	0.0	39.0	60.7
Askersund	1.2	1,196	49.5	28.4	3.3	15.8	2.3	0.2	52.0	47.6
Edsberg	5.6	5,808	48.2	7.9	18.6	19.3	4.5	1.2	53.9	45.8
Fellingsbro	4.7	4,836	44.6	11.6	23.8	17.1	2.3	0.3	47.2	52.6
Glanshammar	2.7	2,760	34.9	11.9	28.0	22.3	2.6	0.1	37.6	62.2
Grimsten	3.2	3,344	55.9	7.3	11.3	15.9	5.5	3.8	65.2	34.4
Grythytte-Hällefors	4.2	4,371	58.4	6.7	0.9	8.5	22.0	3.5	83.9	16.1
Hardemo	1.0	1,018	33.9	12.9	31.2	18.3	0.3	2.3	36.4	62.4
Karlskoga	10.2	10,636	61.2	10.5	10.4	7.4	9.4	0.7	71.3	28.3
Kumla	9.7	10,036	54.5	12.1	8.3	20.4	1.5	2.8	58.8	40.7
Linde-Ramsberg	5.0	5,197	46.7	7.9	27.2	9.8	8.3	0.1	55.2	44.8
Lindesberg	2.0	2,089	41.0	25.6	1.8	21.7	8.6	0.6	50.2	49.0
Nora	1.5	1,525	41.4	29.6	1.3	16.7	8.5	1.6	51.5	47.7
Nora-Hjulsjö	3.9	4,035	55.4	9.7	13.4	12.8	5.6	2.9	63.8	35.9
Nya Kopparberg	4.2	4,324	62.0	7.4	5.1	10.3	11.8	3.3	77.1	22.8
Sköllersta	4.0	4,145	40.8	11.0	16.8	29.3	1.3	0.1	42.2	57.1
Sundbo	4.0	4,165	61.2	6.2	22.8	7.4	1.5	0.8	63.5	36.4
Örebro	18.9	19,634	54.9	21.2	0.6	16.4	4.6	0.8	60.3	38.2
Örebro Hundred	10.4	10,765	57.3	10.5	11.6	14.2	4.7	0.7	62.6	36.4
Postal vote	0.0	38								
Total	3.6	103,986	52.7	12.7	11.4	15.6	5.7	1.3	59.6	39.8
Source: SCB

=== Östergötland ===
Location	Share	Votes	S	AV	B	FP	SP	K	Left	Right
Aska	4.7	7,054	62.8	11.1	10.7	7.1	3.0	3.9	69.8	29.0
Bankekind	4.0	5,981	58.4	11.5	19.1	8.4	1.7	0.5	60.6	39.0
Björkekind	1.2	1,829	42.4	17.2	34.1	5.4	0.1	0.1	42.5	56.6
Boberg	2.5	3,797	47.6	14.7	17.8	8.5	2.3	6.4	56.3	41.0
Bråbo	1.7	2,613	65.5	14.8	7.8	5.8	3.1	1.6	70.1	28.4
Dal	1.3	1,921	51.0	11.7	25.7	4.1	6.9	0.1	57.9	41.5
Finspånga län	8.6	12,883	61.7	10.7	14.9	8.5	1.4	1.1	64.2	34.0
Gullberg	2.1	3,171	57.4	10.6	20.9	5.3	1.3	3.5	62.2	36.8
Göstring	4.3	6,523	47.7	11.0	23.2	6.7	7.2	2.6	57.5	40.9
Hammarkind	4.7	7,088	46.3	16.9	23.0	10.0	1.7	1.2	49.2	49.8
Hanekind	2.3	3,468	53.8	18.1	19.1	7.1	0.2	1.0	54.9	44.3
Kinda	5.3	7,940	44.3	18.2	24.6	10.5	1.1	0.4	45.8	53.3
Linköping	10.8	16,201	54.7	25.5	1.6	11.4	0.8	3.7	59.3	38.5
Lysing	2.7	4,025	39.7	15.3	33.2	9.3	1.0	0.6	41.3	57.7
Lösing	1.6	2,369	55.1	16.0	17.7	5.5	0.6	4.9	60.7	39.1
Memming	1.7	2,531	66.0	12.8	6.4	7.1	6.4	1.2	73.5	26.2
Mjölby	2.1	3,145	63.8	16.4	3.0	10.5	3.1	0.3	67.2	29.9
Motala	2.0	2,999	46.1	30.6	1.1	16.9	1.5	2.1	49.8	48.6
Norrköping	22.9	34,484	58.6	27.3	1.2	6.4	1.9	2.7	63.3	34.9
Skänninge	0.6	827	42.6	22.7	12.2	19.0	0.7	0.2	43.5	53.9
Skärkind	1.5	2,313	51.7	10.5	29.9	6.2	1.0	0.6	53.3	46.6
Söderköping	0.9	1,410	47.7	30.4	3.8	17.4	0.0	0.3	48.0	51.6
Vadstena	1.0	1,546	44.3	31.8	2.3	13.1	6.2	0.3	50.8	47.2
Valkebo	2.2	3,366	48.3	15.1	25.5	8.4	0.4	0.3	49.0	49.0
Vifolka	2.3	3,411	49.0	14.8	23.7	7.8	0.6	2.6	52.3	46.4
Ydre	2.2	3,338	37.7	13.2	29.6	18.0	0.4	0.0	38.1	60.8
Åkerbo	0.9	1,386	38.2	19.6	29.1	9.5	0.0	0.6	38.8	58.2
Östkind	1.7	2,572	38.3	19.4	33.7	7.5	0.3	0.3	38.9	60.7
Postal vote	0.1	107								
Total	5.2	150,298	53.8	19.0	13.1	8.6	1.9	2.1	57.7	40.8
Source: SCB
