= List of governors of Älvsborg County =

This is a list of governors of Älvsborg County of Sweden from 1634 to its dissolution in 1997, when it was merged with Gothenburg and Bohus County and Skaraborg County to form Västra Götaland County.

- Johan Henriksson Reuter (1634–1644)
- Nils Assersson Mannersköld (1644–1648)
- Per Ribbing (1648–1663)
- Per Larsson Sparre (1663–1674)
- Henrik Falkenberg (1674–1676)
- Hans Mörner (1676–1679)
- Henrik von Vicken (1679–1690)
- Lars Eldstierna (1690–1693)
- David Makeléer (1693–1708)
- Axel von Faltzburg (1708–10)
- Anders Sparrfelt (1710–16)
- Gustaf Fock (1716–25)
- Olof Gyllenborg (1725–33)
- Johan Palmfelt (1733–39)
- Axel Erik Roos (1740–49)
- Carl Broman (1749–51)
- Adolf Mörner (1751–56)
- Johan Råfelt (1756–63)
- Mauritz Posse (1763–69)
- Sven Cederström (1769–75)
- Michaël von Törne (1775–85)
- Fredric Lilliehorn (1785–1809)
- Johan Adam Hierta (1810)
- Lars Hierta (1810–1815)
- Per Adolph Ekorn (1816–17)
- Carl Georg Flach (1817–25)
- Paul Sandelhjelm (1825–50)
- Bengt Carl Bergman (1851–58)
- Eric Sparre (1858–86)
- Wilhelm Lothigius (1886–1905)
- Karl Husberg (1905–22)
- Axel von Sneidern (1922–41)
- Vilhelm Lundvik (1941–49)
- Arvid Richert (1949–54)
- Mats Lemne (1955–70)
- Gunnar von Sydow (1970–78)
- Göte Fridh (1978–91)
- Bengt K.Å. Johansson (1991–97)
