= List of governors of Gothenburg and Bohus County =

This is a list of governors of Gothenburg and Bohus County of Sweden from 1680 to its dissolution in 1997, when it was merged with Skaraborg County and Älvsborg County to form Västra Götaland County.

- Georg Lybecker (1680–1682)
- Johan von Schönleben (1682–1700)
- Erik Siöblad (1700–1711)
- Carl Gustaf Mörner (1712–1719)
- Nils Posse (1719–1723)
- Axel Gyllenkrok (1723–1730)
- Bengt Ribbing (1730–1741)
- Lorentz Kristoffer Stobée (1741–1749)
- Johan von Kaulbars (1749–1762)
- Didrik Henrik Taube (1763–1772)
- Anders Du Rietz (1772–1790)
- Johan Beck-Friis (1790–1796)
- Samuel af Forselles (1796–1800)
- Johan Fredrik Carpelan (1800–1808)
- Axel von Rosen (1809–1834)
- Gillis Edenhjelm (1835–1843)
- Carl Gustaf Löwenhielm (1843–1847)
- Olof Fåhræus (1847–1864)
- Albert Ehrensvärd (1864–1885)
- Gustaf Fredrik Snoilsky (1885–1897)
- Gustaf Lagerbring (1897–1917)
- Oscar von Sydow (1917–1934)
- Malte Jacobsson (1934–1950)
- Per Nyström (1950–1971)
- Erik Huss (1971–1978)
- Carl Persson (1979–1980)
- Åke Norling (1980–1989)
- Kjell A. Mattsson (1989–1995)
- Göran Bengtsson (1996–1997)
