= List of governors of Skaraborg County =

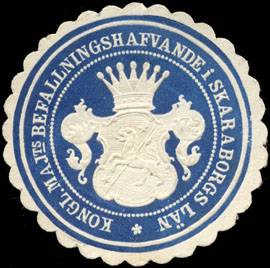
19th century seal of office.

This is a list of governors of Skaraborg County of Sweden from 1683 to its dissolution in 1997, when it was merged with Gothenburg and Bohus County and Älvsborg County to form Västra Götaland County.

- Peter Örneklou (1683–1690)
- Harald Strömfelt (1695–1707)
- Carl Gustaf Soop (1707–1711)
- Germund Cederhielm d.ä. (1712–1716)
- Germund Cederhielm d.y. (1716)
- Peter Scheffer (1716–1723)
- Gustaf Rålamb (1723–1727)
- Erik Wrangel (1727–1729)
- Gustaf Palmfelt (1729–1733)
- Frans Joachim Ehrenstrahl (1733–1735)
- Gabriel Falkenberg (1735–1748)
- Gabriel Gabrielsson Falkenberg (1748–1761)
- Adam Otto Lagerberg (1761–1778)
- Claes Erik Silfverhielm (1778–1784)
- Claes Julius Ekeblad (1784–1796)
- Johan Adam Hierta (1796–1810)
- Georg Adlersparre (1810–1824)
- Arvid Posse (1824–1831)
- Carl Henrik Gyllenhaal (1831–1837)
- Wilhelm Albrecht d'Orchimont (1837–1851)
- Anders Peter Sandströmer (1851–1857)
- Jonas Wærn (1857–1866)
- Carl Malmsten (1866–1879)
- Cornelius Sjöcrona (1879–1906)
- Fabian de Geer (1906–1917)
- Axel Ekman (1917–1935)
- Carl Mannerfelt (1935–1951)
- Fritiof Domö (1951–1956)
- Bertil Fallenius (1956–1967)
- Karl Frithiofson (1967–1986)
- Lennart Orehag (1986–1990)
- Birger Bäckström (1991–1997)
