= Älvsborg County =

County in Sweden between 1634 and 1997

Coordinates: 58°23′N 12°19′E

Älvsborg County Älvsborgs län
- County of Sweden
- 1634–1997
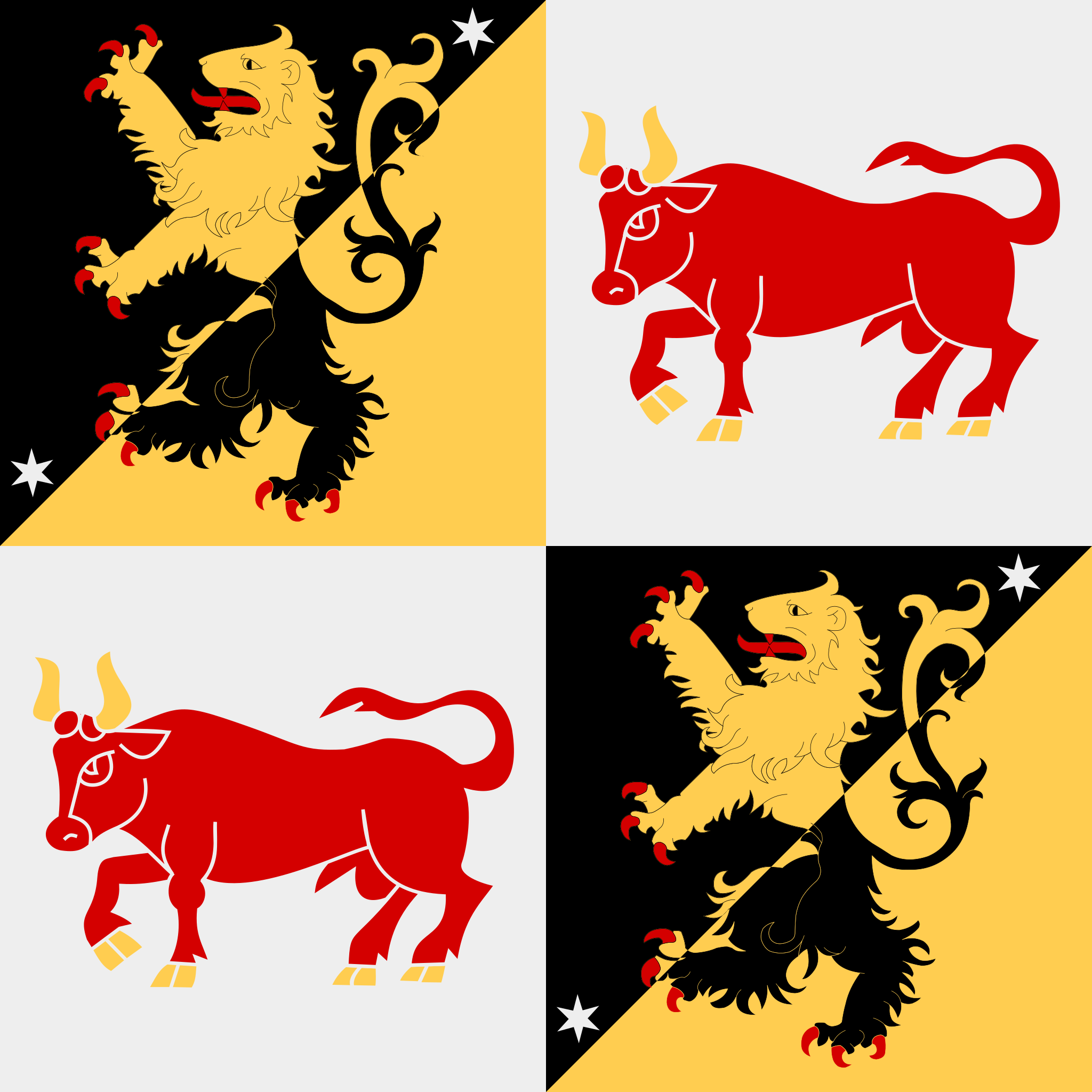
- Flag Coat of arms
- Capital: Old Älvsborg; Gothenburg; Vänersborg
- Government
- Governor
  - 1991–1997: Bengt K.Å. Johansson
- History
  - Established: 1634
  - Disestablished: 31 December 1997
Succeeded by
Västra Götaland County

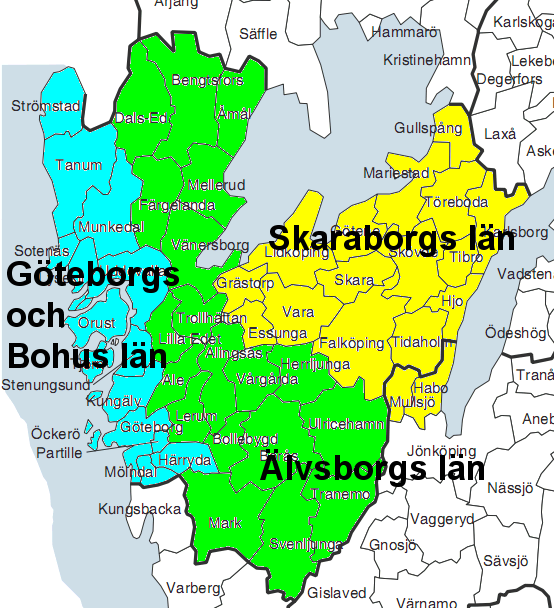
The three former counties that constitute today's Västra Götaland County.

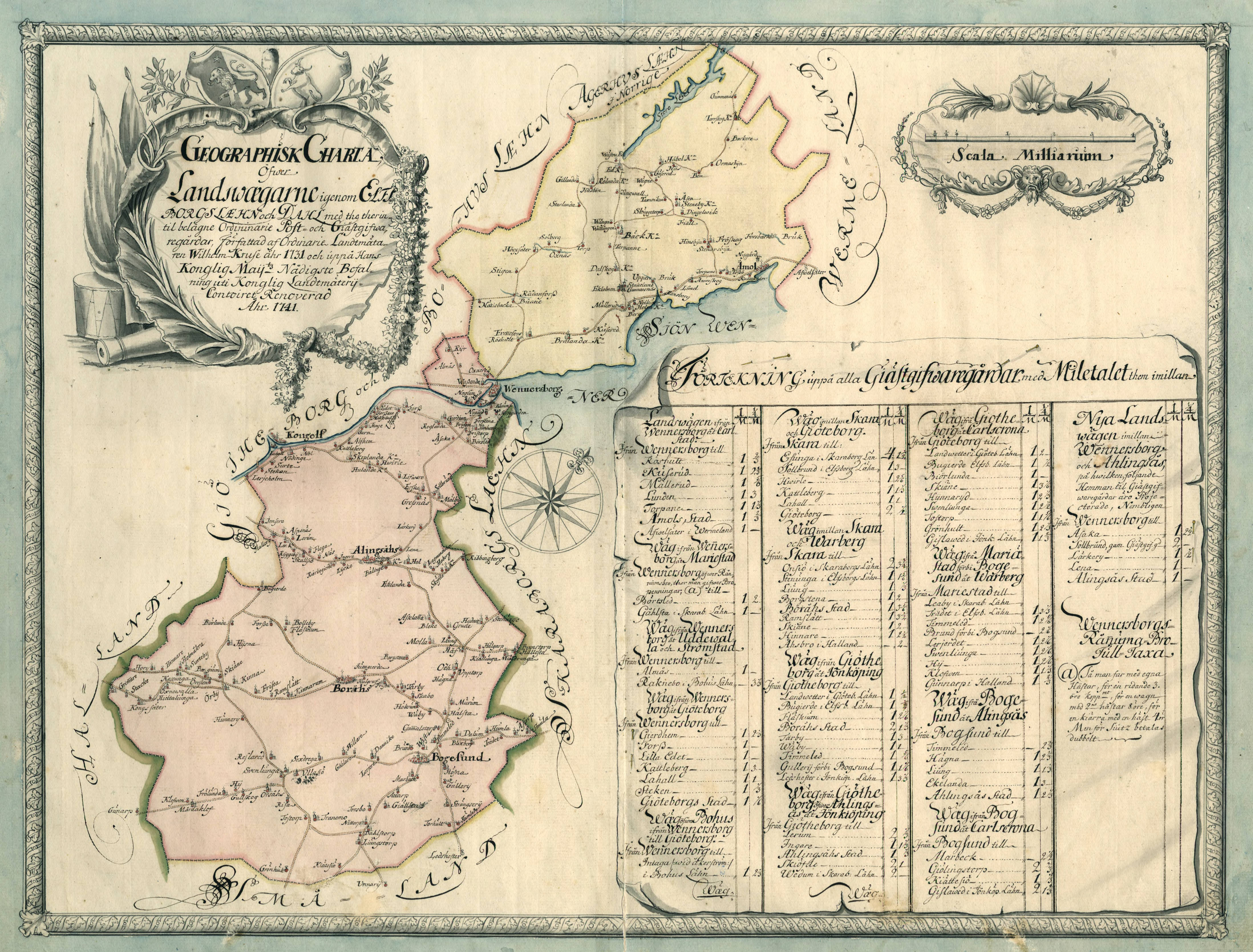
Map of the country roads through Älvsborg county and Dalsland in 1731.

Älvsborg County (Swedish: Älvsborgs län) was a county of Sweden until 1997, when it was merged with the counties of Gothenburg & Bohus and Skaraborg to form Västra Götaland County.

== Background ==
The county corresponded to the traditional province of Dalsland and the southwestern part of the province of Västergötland, and its coat of arms was created by quartering the respective arms of those provinces.

Älvsborg County initially encompassed the entire western half of Västergötland, and was named after Älvsborg Castle, which is where the county administration was initially based. Älvsborg was demolished in the 1660s and the county seat moved to nearby Gothenburg, but the county continued to bear the name Älvsborg. Under the 1658 Treaty of Roskilde, the Norwegian province of Bohuslän was transferred to Sweden, and in 1680 it was decided to form a new county comprising Bohuslän and the western part of Västergötland, creating the new Gothenburg and Bohus County.

The seat of Älvsborg County (which had become even more of a misnomer, as the site of the former Älvsborg fortress now lay within the new Gothenburg and Bohus County) therefore had to be moved again, this time to Vänersborg.

== Notable residents ==
- Kjell Johansson (born 1951), tennis player

== See also ==
- List of governors of Älvsborg County
- List of governors of Gothenburg and Bohus County
- List of governors of Skaraborg County
- List of Västra Götaland Governors
- County Governors of Sweden
