= Gothenburg and Bohus County =

County in Sweden between 1680 and 1997

Coordinates: 58°10′N 11°30′E

Gothenburg and Bohus County Göteborgs och Bohus län
- County of Sweden
- 1680–1997
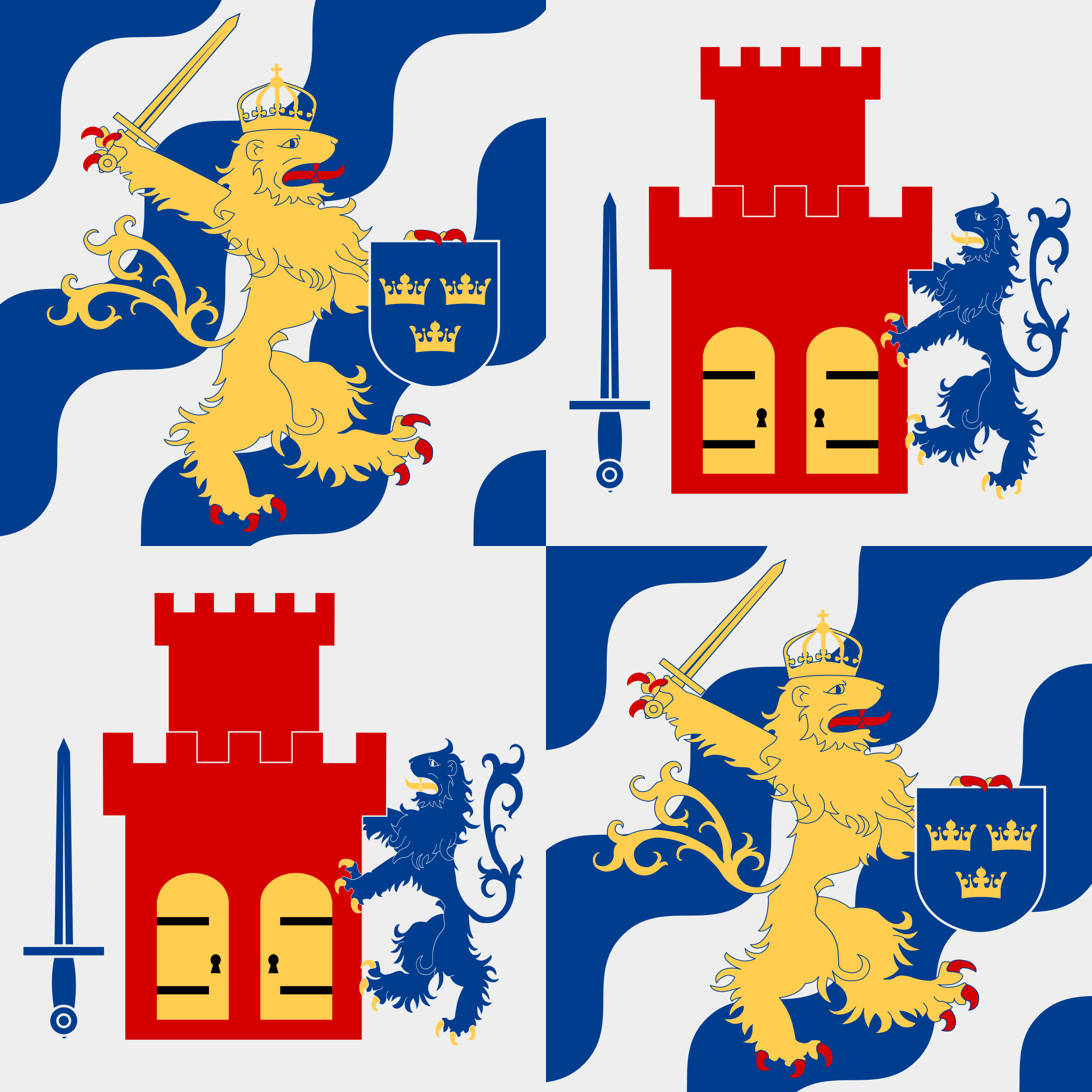
- Flag Coat of arms
- Capital: Gothenburg
- Government
- Governor
  - 1680–82: Georg Lybecker
  - 1996–97: Göran Bengtsson
- History
  - Established: 1680
  - Disestablished: 31 December 1997
Succeeded by
Västra Götaland County

Gothenburg and Bohus County (Swedish: Göteborgs och Bohus län) was a county of Sweden until 1 January 1998, when it was merged with Skaraborg County and Älvsborg County to form Västra Götaland County.

The county was named after the city of Gothenburg and the historical province of Bohuslän. Gothenburg was the seat of residence for the governor and represented the westernmost part of the province of Västergötland.

== See also ==
- List of governors of Gothenburg and Bohus County
- List of governors of Älvsborg County
- List of governors of Skaraborg County
- List of governors of Västra Götaland County
- County Governors of Sweden
