= Skaraborg County =

County of Sweden from 1634 to 1997

Skaraborg County Skaraborgs län
- County of Sweden
- 1634–1997
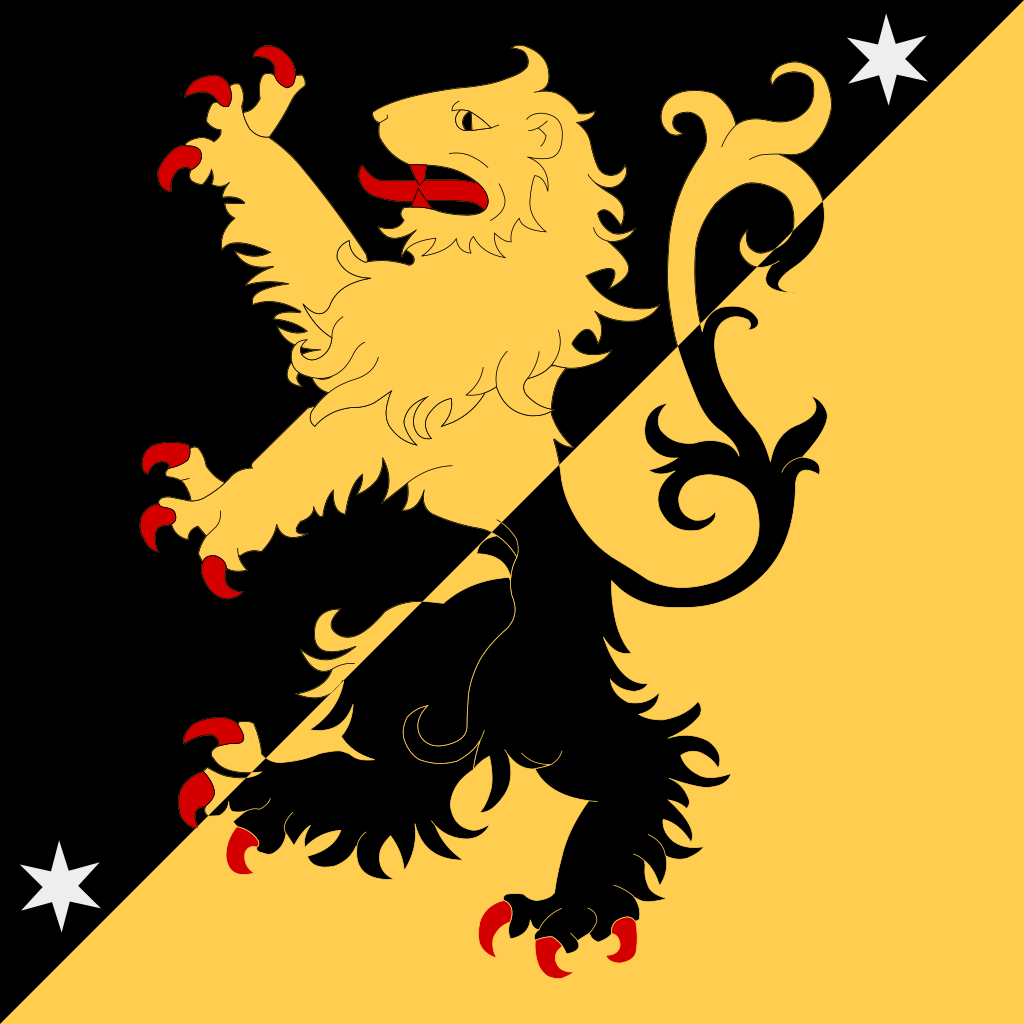
- Flag Coat of arms
- Capital: Skara (1634–1660); Mariestad (1660–1997)
- Government
- Governor
  - 1991–97: Birger Bäckström
- History
  - Established: 1634
  - Disestablished: 31 December 1997
Succeeded by
Västra Götaland County

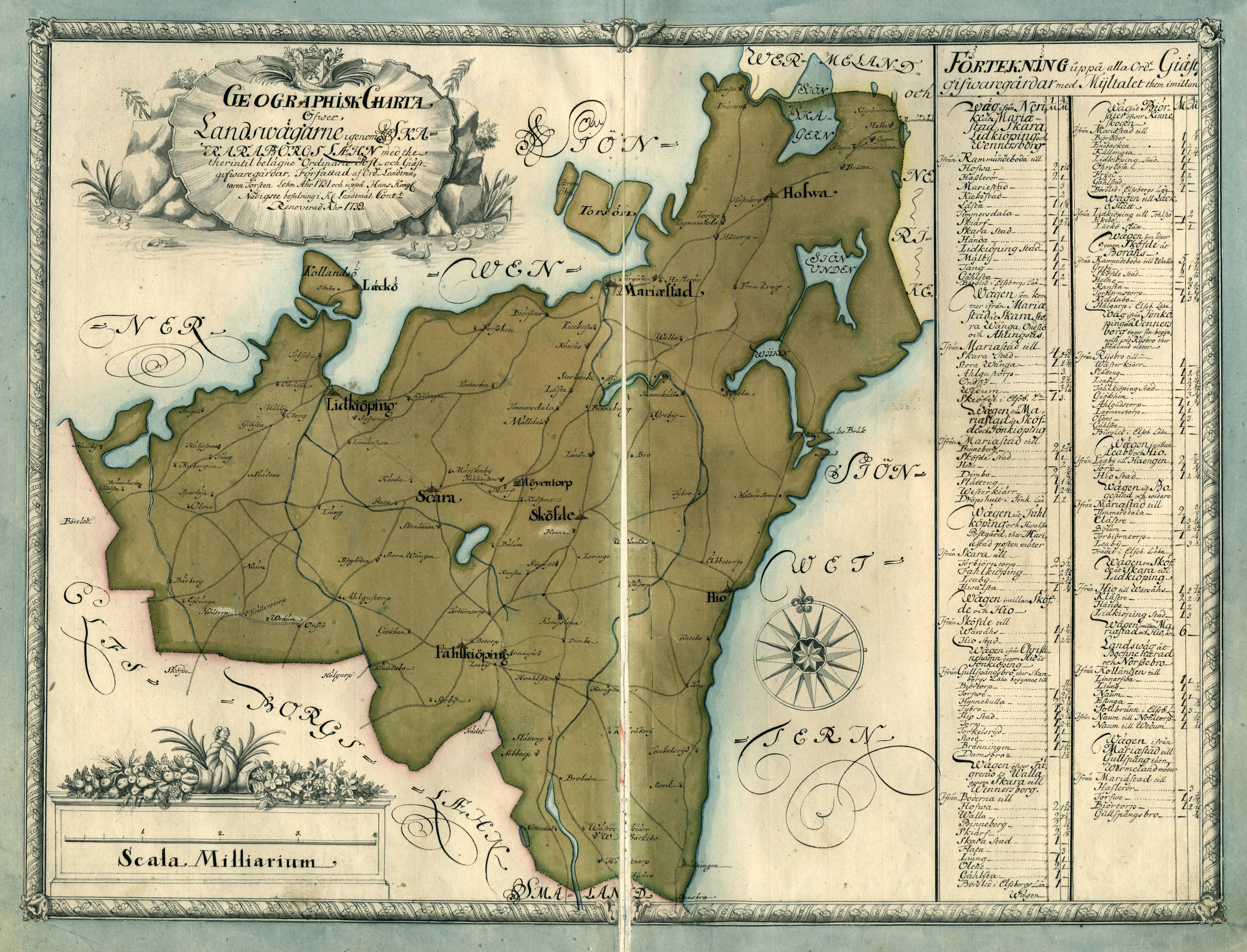
Map of the country roads through Skaraborg county in 1731

Skaraborg County (Swedish: Skaraborgs län [ˈskɑ̂ːraˌbɔrjs ˈlɛːn]) was a county of Sweden from 1634 until 1997. It was disestablished at the end of 1997 when it was merged with the counties of Gothenburg and Bohus and Älvsborg to form Västra Götaland County.

== Background ==
The county was named after a fortress (borg) outside the city of Skara. The seat of residence for the county governor was Mariestad from 1660 onwards, but the largest city (during the 20th century) was first Lidköping and later Skövde. The county consisted of the central plain (Västgötaslätten) along with the eastern and northeastern parts of the province of Västergötland.

Even though Skaraborg County itself no longer exists, various private companies and public organizations are still named after it, and cover that approximate area. These include several newspapers, one public radio channel and various non-profit organizations. Also, the regional hospital complex in Skövde is named Skaraborgs sjukhus, as is the Skaraborg Wing (F 7) in Såtenäs and the Skaraborg Regiment (P 4) in Skövde.

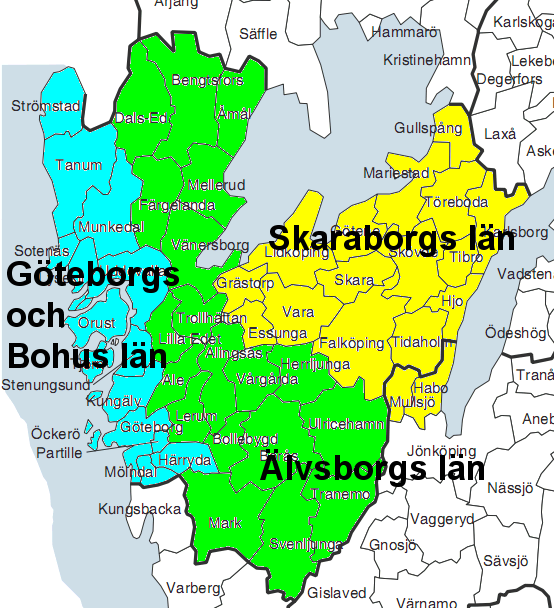
The area in yellow was the territory that made up Skaraborg County.

Two of the municipalities, Habo and Mullsjö, adjacent to the city of Jönköping, were transferred to the Jönköping County at the time of dissolution.

== See also ==
- County administrative boards of Sweden
- List of governors of Skaraborg County
- List of governors of Västra Götaland County
