= Kataib Rouh Allah Issa Ibn Miriam =

Iraqi Assyrian militia (2014–2015)

- كتائب روح الله عيسى بن مريم
- Leader: Salwan Momika
- Dates active: 2014–2015
- Dissolved: Second half of 2015
- Allegiance: Iraq
- Active regions: Iraq
- Ideology: Aramean nationalism Iraqi Assyrian interests
- Part of: Kata'ib al-Imam Ali

Kataib Rouh Allah Issa Ibn Miriam (Arabic: كتائب روح الله عيسى بن مريم, lit. 'Spirit of God Jesus Son of Mary Battalions') was an Assyrian Christian militia and subgroup of the Imam Ali Brigades, which was part of the Popular Mobilization Forces. The group was first organized in 2014 after an agreement between the Imam Ali Brigades and Salwan Momika, and primarily participated in the War in Iraq (2013-17) to fight against ISIS.

The militia was one of other minority militias formed to create a non-sectarian image of the PMU, and to position the Imam Ali Brigade's factions as better protectors of minorities in Iraq. The group is believed to have participated in sporadic episodes of combat, but it has never been made clear to what extent they were involved. Relations between the militia and the Imam Ali Brigades were reportedly strained as Momika attempted to stake out more autonomy, leading to his imprisonment and accusations of being an Israeli spy. After arbitrary detentions of other members by the Asayish, the militia gradually dissolved in the second half of 2015.

After the group's dissolution, Momika attempted unsuccessfully to create a new political party/militia in northern Iraq. Larger public knowledge of Kataib Rouh Allah Issa Ibn Miriam surfaced after Momika's involvement in the 2023 Quran burnings in Sweden, and in June 2025, the group alongside the larger Imam Ali Brigades was added to the Specially Designated Nationals and Blocked Persons List of the Office of Foreign Assets Control.

== History ==
Kataib Rouh Allah Issa Ibn Miriam was formed in December 2014 as a Christian subgroup of the Imam Ali Brigades, affiliated with the Popular Mobilization Forces. The militia was formed by Salwan Momika, an Assyrian from Qaraqosh, who reached an agreement to form the subunit in October 2014 after the expansion of ISIS in Iraq. The militia was named the Kataib Rouh Allah Issa Ibn Miriam (Arabic: كتائب روح الله عيسى بن مريم, lit. 'Spirit of God Jesus Son of Mary Battalions') against Momika's wishes; a staunch Aramean nationalist, Momika instead referred to the militia as the "Syriac Lions Battalions (SLB)", and public pages for the brigade used symbolism of Syriac/Aramean identity as opposed to an Assyrian one.

Kataib Rouh Allah Issa Ibn Miriam was one of other minority militias, alongside the Babylon Brigade and smaller Sunni Muslim factions, that were created to form a non-sectarian image of the Popular Mobilization Forces, playing an image of affinity between Christians and Shia Muslims. The formation of the group was also described as an "entrepreneurial move" by Sheykh Shibl al-Zaidi, head of the Imam-Ali brigades, to capitalize off of the dissatisfaction of Nineveh's Christians with Kurdish forces, who faced accusations of leaving minorities vulnerable to ISIS.

== Activities ==
Upon the formation of the group, the Imam Ali Brigades opened a training session for Assyrian irregulars to take part of, which was presumed to be short but extensive. Soon thereafter, recruits joined the Imam-Ali Brigades in combat. In Spring 2015, the group supposedly participated in combat during the Second Battle of Tikrit and the Battle of Baiji. Indian magazine The Week noted that the group had operated on the outskirts of Mosul from 2017, and that they had also been sanctioned by the U.S. government since 2018. The size of the militia was never well established, and it is not known how large its participation actually was, nor the extent to which it was involved in combat. Author Carl Drott estimates that the militia had 30 Assyrian members in 2015.

Relations between Kataib Rouh Allah Issa Ibn Miriam and the Imam Ali Brigades were reportedly strained as Momika attempted to give the militia more autonomy. Hoping to keep within the network of Iran-backed affiliates, he first met the representative of Hezbollah in Mount Lebanon Governorate, who believed that he held influence over refugees from Bakhdida. When this attempt failed, Momika attempted to get support from within Israel, reaching out to an Israeli Assyrian who was involved in lobbying efforts to have Aramean identity recognized in the country. The request was turned down, and Momika was later interrogated and imprisoned with accusations of being an Israeli spy.

== Legacy ==
The militia faced challenges as members en route to Erbil were arbitrarily detained by the Asayish and used as instruments for negotiations. Other members feared being arrested, which caused them to leave. By the second half of 2015, the militia had gradually dissolved. After the liberation of the Nineveh Plains from ISIS, Kataib Rouh Allah Issa Ibn Miriam has not had any recorded activity, though the detained members were eventually released.

After the dissolution of the militia, Momika moved up north to start a new political party, the Syriac Democratic Union, along with its own militia called the Syriac Hawks Forces. However, the political party was out of the mainstream of Assyrian politics in Iraq, and the SHF was uninvolved in the Battle of Mosul.

Larger public of the Kataib Rouh Allah Issa Ibn Miriam militia, as well as Momika's involvement, resurfaced after the 2023 Quran burnings in Sweden, when a video surfaced of him delivering a speech addressing soldiers. In his speech, Momika said:

“We either live with dignity or die courageously. I am the officer in charge of Kata’ib Rouh Allah Issa Ibn Miriam (the Brigade of the Spirit of God Jesus, Son of Mary), which is affiliated with the Imam Ali Brigades, peace be upon him.”

On 12 June 2025, the militia was added to the Specially Designated Nationals and Blocked Persons List of the Office of Foreign Assets Control, alongside the larger Kataib al-Imam Ali group.

== Bibliography ==
- Drott, Carl (2021). Minority politics by other means: Assyrian militias in Iraq 2014–2017 (PhD thesis). University of Oxford.
- Gastion, Erica; Derzsi-Horvath, Andras; van den Toorn, Christine; Mathieu-Comtois, Sarah (6 August 2017). Backgrounder: Literature Review of Local, Regional or Sub-State Defense Forces in Iraq (PDF) (Report). Global Public Policy Institute, American University of Iraq, Sulaimani. p. 19.
- Rudolf, Inna (7 April 2026). "The pioneers of the mobilisation's vanguard". Iraq's Shi'a Warriors: From Battlefield to Parliament. Manchester University Press. p. 103. ISBN 9781526193056.
