= Syriac Democratic Union =

Iraqi Assyrian political party (2014–2018)

Syriac Democratic Union (SDU) ܟܘܢܫܐ ܕܺܝܡܩܪܛܝܐ ܣܘܪܝܝܐ حزب الاتحاد السرياني الديمقراطي
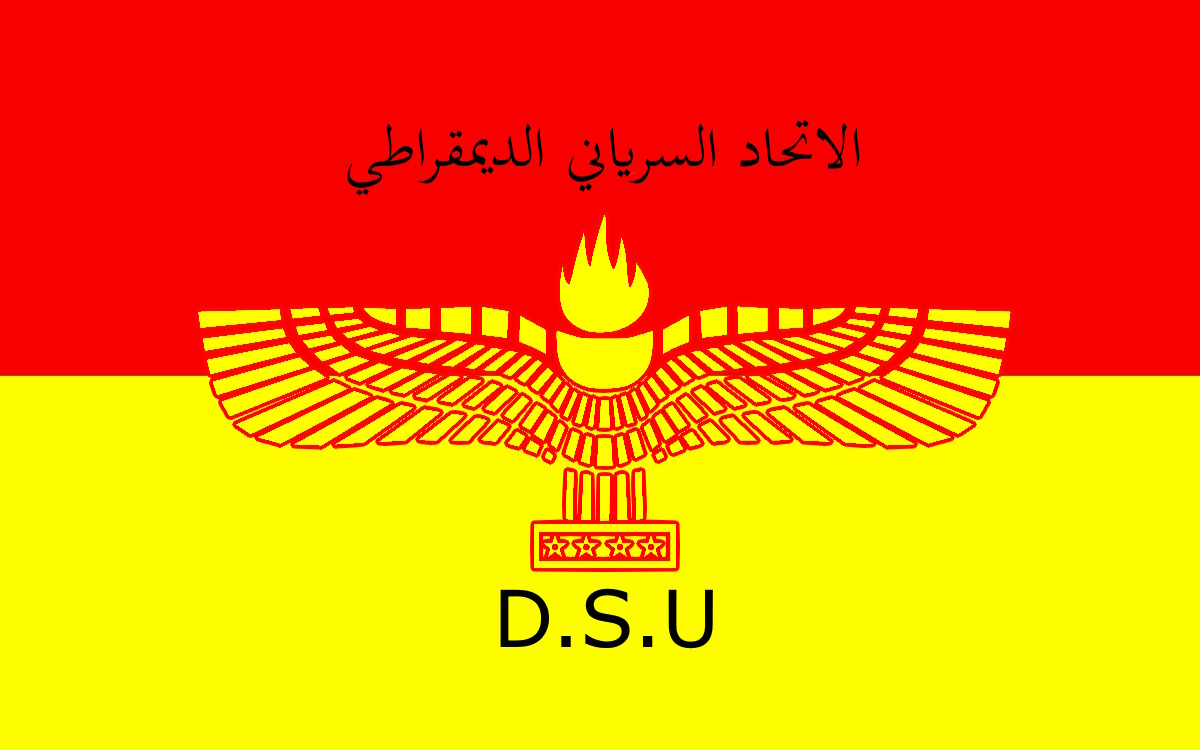
- Abbreviation: SDU
- Leader: Salwan Momika
- Founder: Salwan Momika
- Founded: 2014; 12 years ago
- Dissolved: 2018
- Military wing: Syriac Hawks Forces
- Ideology: Aramean nationalism

The Syriac Democratic Union (SDU, Arabic: الاتحاد السرياني الديمقراطي; Syriac: ܟܘܢܫܐ ܕܺܝܡܩܪܛܝܐ ܣܘܪܝܝܐ), also known as the Syriac Democratic Union Party (Arabic: حزب الاتحاد السرياني الديمقراطي), was a short-lived Iraqi Assyrian political party. Founded by Salwan Momika in 2014, the party was properly set up in northern Iraq after the dissolution of his previous militia, Kataib Rouh Allah Issa Ibn Miriam. The SDU was also founded with a paramilitary wing, the Syriac Hawks Forces (SHF, Arabic: كتائب صقور السريان), a few months after its establishment.

By the time Momika had founded SDU/SHF, his public reputation had largely declined, yet he was able to receive structural support from the Dawronoye organization. The group was unable to secure a powerful backer, switching between courting the Kurdistan Democratic Party and the Popular Mobilization Forces. Following a conflict with the Babylon Brigade, Momika's tenure with both the party and the militia ended, and he had fled Iraq altogether by 2018. The party barely established a support base on the periphery of Assyrian politics in Iraq, and the militia had only achieved a small territorial presence, with many of its members having left due to salary issues.

Years after their disestablishment, larger public knowledge of the SDU and the SHF militia surfaced following Momika's involvement in the 2023 Quran burnings in Sweden.

== Formation ==
The Syriac Democratic Union (SDU) was founded in 2014 by Salwan Momika, an Iraqi Assyrian Christian from the Nineveh Governorate and later anti-Islam activist. Momika moved back to the north of Iraq to set up the SDU following the dissolution of his previous Kataib Rouh Allah Issa Ibn Miriam militia, which dissolved due to members fearing arrest from the Asayish. The party's first conference was broken up by the Asayish, but the party itself was prevented from being shut down by an NGO member affiliated with the Kurdistan Democratic Party. After the intervention, the party was allowed to maintain an office in Ankawa.

According to the Assyrian Confederation of Europe, the party was funded by the KDP as an effort to drive division among Assyrians by "artificially nurturing separatist identities". KDP interference in Iraqi Assyrian politics was previously observed through the formation of political parties and organizations espousing sectarian identities, in order to drive divisions amongst them. At the time of the party's activities, Momika was a proponent of Syriac identity as distinct from an Assyrian one, and described the SDU as "independent and representative of the Syriac-Aramean people in Iraq." The party's ideology was defined by a Syriac separatism/nationalism with anti-Assyrian sectarian hostilities, (Note: Drott specifies that these hostilities were understood as being directed towards members of the Assyrian Church of the East and the Ancient Church of the East) which was also Momika's only stable ideological conviction. Journalist Max Joseph described the party (and the SHF militia) as the then-most recent "tokenistic representation on the ground in Nineveh of Aramean/Syriac sectarianism."

By the time Momika had founded SDU, his public reputation had largely diminished among Iraqi Assyrians, as he was seen as a contemptible and possibly violent figure who only desired personal status. However, the party would obtain support from the Dawronoye, a transnational political movement founded by Turkish Assyrians in the European diaspora. Author Carl Drott considered the Dawronoye's decision to support SDU "puzzling" due to Momika's poor reputation; he reasoned that they sought interest in Momika's founding of the Syriac Hawks Forces (SHF) militia and was desperate to make itself relevant in the war against the Islamic State (ISIS), especially after the failure of the Nineveh Plain Forces which they had previously supported.

== Political activities ==
In 2017, the SDU political bureau condemned the Palm Sunday church bombings staged by ISIS in Egypt and offered condolences to the Coptic Orthodox Church. That same year in June, the party released and signed a statement supporting the "Future for Christians in Iraq" conference held in Brussels, alongside the Warka Democratic Bloc and the Independent Christian Democratic Movement. The Assyrian Democratic Movement demanded that the SDU be excluded from the conference, since the Dawronoye-affiliated Beth Nahrin Patriotic Union was already present as its representative.

In 2018, the party met with a delegation from the Beth Nahrin Patriotic Union and the Suraya Organization for Culture and Media to discuss human rights violations in Bartella and the Nineveh Plains via cases of land grabbing from "influential parties in power". A month later, the SDU political bureau sent a condolence letter mourning the passing of Dilovan Barzani, the brother of the then prime minister of the Kurdistan Regional Government Nechirvan Barzani.

== Syriac Hawks Forces ==
Syriac Hawks Forces
- كتائب صقور السريان
- Logo for the SHF militia
- Founder: Salwan Momika
- Leader: Salwan Momika
- Founded: 2014
- Dissolved: 2018
- Allegiance: Iraq
- Ideology: Aramean nationalism
- Wars: War in Iraq (2013–2017)

The Syriac Hawks Forces (SHF, Arabic: كتائب صقور السريان) was founded alongside the SDU in 2014, also by Momika, to fight against ISIS during the War in Iraq (2013–2017). Momika had switched from cooperation with the Popular Mobilization Forces (PMF) to the KDP on the founding of the SHF. However, negotiations between the SDF and the KDP failed, and the militia did not participate in military operations for the Nineveh Plains' recapture. Drott estimates that the KDP didn't extend its support due to the SHF appearing as a "superfluous ally", and as the last Assyrian militia to deploy during the war, demand for propaganda was low and potential allies likely doubted any ability it had to establish an on-ground presence. The militia formed an alliance with the Babylon Brigade (BB) and was briefly welcomed back into the sphere of the PMF after talks with the KDP failed, but the alliance with BB only lasted a few weeks, and nothing came of negotiations with the PMF. The militia was thus left without a powerful backer.

SHF appeared after its founding to establish a base in Bakhdida, with the assistance of the NGO member who initially helped the party. The militia reportedly was unable to cover the most basic of its needs, as it allegedly only had five weapons when it first deployed. While additional weapons were provided by the Babylon Brigade, these were later reclaimed after the alliance broke down. The militia was left out of local security arrangements, with Drott considering it surprising that they were able to even be in the town at all.

The militia initially provided no salaries to members, but later started paying small sums in early 2017 at a maximum salary of 400,000 Iraqi dinars a month, missing these payments frequently. Drott estimates that the militia had 20 Assyrian members in 2016, which decreased down to seven the following year, mainly due to the unpaid salaries. Most members were eventually absorbed into the Babylon Brigade, which attempted to bring the entire SHF under its influence. The militia attempted to cover salary payments through donations, such as a 5,000,000 dinar donation from the Imam Ali Battalions; donations from larger actors were relatively rare for Iraqi Assyrian militias, but the donation to SHF was later alleged to be embezzled. SHF was also able to receive foreign donations due to filling a niche among donors as the only militia (apart from the formerly active Kataib Rouh Allah Issa Ibn Miriam) to espouse a distinct Syriac identity, as well as a lack of information on Momika in the diaspora. Momika claimed to have received funds from the World Council of Arameans, who had cut ties before the establishment of SHF due to its ties with the Dawronoye (who provided an embezzled donation of 4,500 US dollars). The militia largely lacked any ability to directly raise funds due to the lack of a powerful ally, and the Dawronoye ultimately didn't step in to cover basic needs.

== Dissolution ==
Momika's tenure with the SDU and SHF ended due to a political fallout with Rayan al-Kildani of the Babylon Brigade. Relations between al-Kildani and Momika were previously cordial, and the latter had endorsed al-Kildani in the 2014 Iraqi parliamentary election (a fact which Momika later denied). On Valentine's Day in 2017, the conflict between the two militias began when an SHF member was shot by BB members, resulting in a drunken Momika returning fire. Later, he attacked the BB base with a grenade, and returning to the SHF base, agreed to a ceasefire with al-Kildani. A few hours later, the BB militia arrived at the SHF base to detain Momika, who was then questioned by a PMF delegation and detained for two weeks. The conflict appeared to have been confusing for both sides, with each claiming different things about how the dispute played out, but neither had the intention to kill. Mutual restraint between BB and SHF was enacted during the conflict due to shared norms and fear of political reprisal.

As a result of the struggle, Momika fled Iraq and settled in Sweden in 2018. By the time Momika left Iraq, SHF only managed to obtain a sparse presence over territory, and the SDU barely established a foothold in Iraqi Assyrian politics.

== Legacy ==
Following the 2023 Quran burnings in Sweden, Momika's political past in Iraq, including his founding of SDU and the SHF militia, surfaced as larger public knowledge. During this time, the Syriac Union Party in Syria released a statement denying affiliation with SDU, after a misattribution from Orient News was publicized.

== Bibliography ==
- Drott, Carl (2021). Minority politics by other means: Assyrian militias in Iraq 2014–2017 (PhD thesis). University of Oxford.
- Hanna, Reine; Barber, Matthew (25 September 2017). Erasing Assyrians: How the KRG Abuses Human Rights, Undermines Democracy, and Conquers Minority Homelands (PDF) (Report). Assyrian Confederation of Europe. pp. 40–41.
- Hanna, Reine; Joseph, Max (27 November 2018). Iraq's Stolen Election: How Assyrian Representation Became Assyrian Repression (PDF) (Report). Assyrian Policy Institute.
