= 2023 Quran burnings in Sweden =

Protest in Stockholm, Sweden

In 2023, instances of Quran-burning occurred in Sweden, which were named collectively by Swedish media as the Korankrisen ("Quran crisis"; "Quran burning crisis" in some English-language media). The most notable of them occurred on 28 June 2023, when 37-year-old Iraqi Assyrian refugee Salwan Momika ripped out and set fire to pages of the Quran outside the Stockholm Mosque. This incident caused international protests and condemnation, particularly among the Muslim world. On 20 July, Momika planned another Quran burning in Stockholm, which resulted in protestors storming the Swedish embassy in Baghdad and committing arson.

This resulted in several follow-up protests in Denmark, in which the Quran was burned outside the embassies of several Muslim-majority countries. Counterprotests, in the form of violence and boycotts, eventually caused Denmark to reintroduce blasphemy laws criminalising the "inappropriate treatment" of religious texts.

Momika was killed on 29 January 2025, at the age of 38, after being shot in an apartment building in Södertälje, near Stockholm.

== Incidents ==
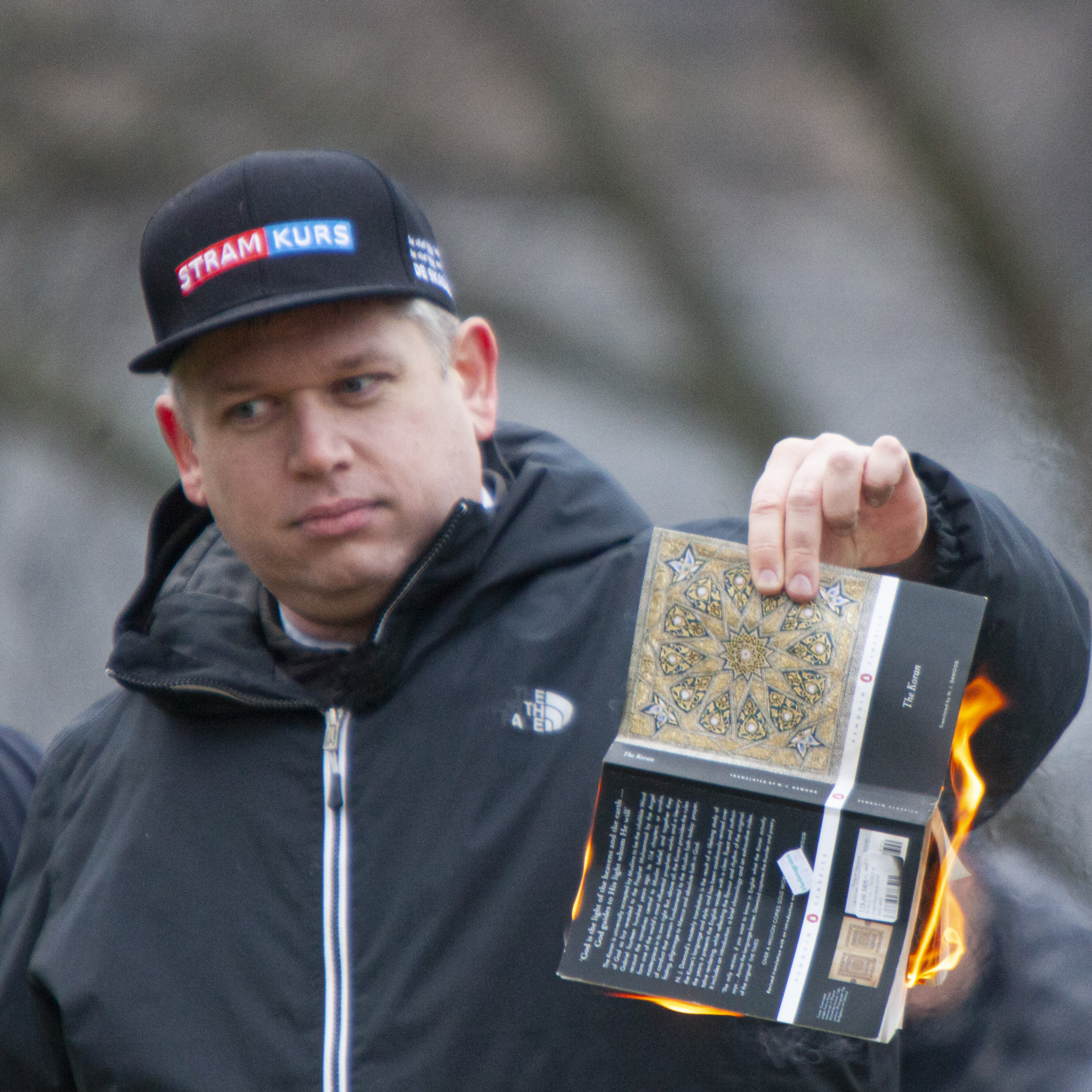
Rasmus Paludan burning a Quran in January 2023

In January 2023, the Danish far-right politician Rasmus Paludan burned a copy of the Quran outside of the Turkish embassy in Stockholm, leading the Turkish defence minister Hulusi Akar to suspend talks with Sweden over its NATO membership. Separate pro-Kurdish and anti-NATO demonstrations were also held outside the embassy.

Salwan Momika was a 38-year-old Assyrian man who moved to Sweden in 2018 having fled Iraq as a refugee. He was an atheist and called for a ban on the Quran in Sweden. On 28 June, he appeared behind a line of police officers outside the Stockholm Mosque, holding two Swedish flags while the Du gamla, du fria, the de facto national anthem of Sweden, played over loudspeakers. He tore apart the Quran and set it on fire, while also placing a strip of bacon on it. One protester attempted to throw something at him and was arrested. The event occurred during Eid al-Adha, a major holiday in Islam.

Following the incident, Stockholm police said that they had received further requests for Quran-burning permits, as well as requests to burn the Torah and Bible outside the Israeli embassy, but these were later called off.

Several follow-up protests occurred in Denmark in the following weeks. On 24 July, a Quran was burned outside the Iraqi embassy by Danish far-right activists. On 25 July, protesters burned a Quran outside the Egyptian embassy in Copenhagen, and on the same day, a Quran was burned outside the Turkish embassy. On 31 July, a total of seven Quran-burnings were planned in Denmark.

On 3 September 2023, a riot broke out and protesters threw stones at police after Momika had lit a copy of the Quran in the presence of 200 onlookers.

On 29 January 2025, Momika was assassinated at his home.

== Protests and violence ==
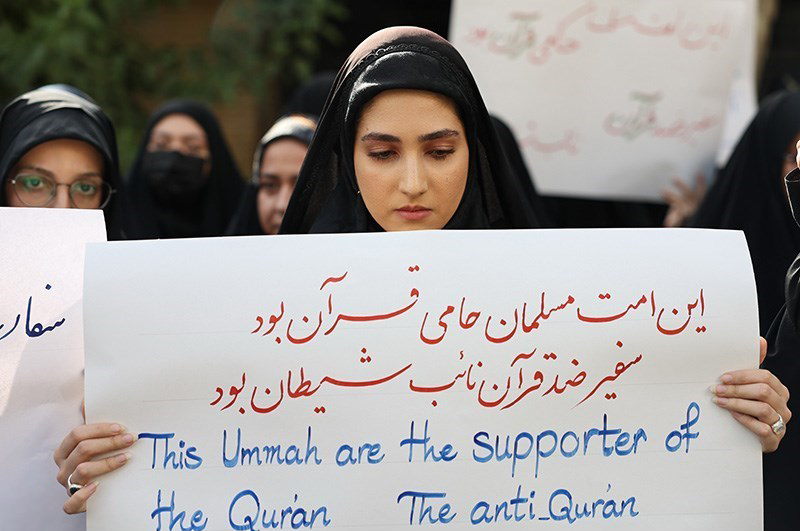
Protester outside the Swedish Embassy in Tehran, Iran

The Swedish Institute noted increasingly negative rhetoric from Muslims towards Sweden and the Swedish government and police, as well as calls for boycotts on social media and from political and religious leaders in the Muslim world. A poll conducted by Swedish pollster Novus in collaboration with an Iraqi polling institute showed that 77% of polled Iraqis viewed Sweden as anti‑Islam.

Two protests took place outside the Karachi Press Club on 2 July 2023, condemning the burning. In Islamabad, Pakistan, police officers prevented supporters of the religious group Jamaat-e-Islami from marching towards the Swedish Embassy during a rally.

The Pakistan-based Sunni extremist organisation Lashkar-e-Jhangvi called for a genocide against Pakistani Christians to avenge Sweden's quran burning in a statement on 1 July.

On 29 June, protesters stormed the Swedish embassy in Baghdad after the Iraqi cleric Muqtada al-Sadr called Sweden "hostile to Islam". The protesters briefly entered the building. On 19 July, after another planned Quran-burning, the embassy was stormed and set aflame by protesters, while Iraq expelled the Swedish ambassador, severed diplomatic ties with Sweden and banned Swedish businesses in Iraq. The United States criticised the Iraqi security forces for not preventing protesters from storming the embassy grounds.

On 7 July, Iraqi football team Erbil SC kicked off the new season of the Iraqi Premier League at the Franso Hariri Stadium with a demonstration condemning the Quran burning.

In response to the burnings, the Iran-affiliated Iraqi militia Ashab al-Kahf, issued threats on Telegram urging followers to target "every Swede" with violence.

On the evening of 16 October 2023, an Islamic State sympathiser killed two Swedish nationals attending a football match at Place Sainctelette in Molenbeek, Brussels, and injured another. Belgian authorities said that a motive for the killing was that the victims were Swedish, and that the crime was potentially carried out as revenge for the Quran burnings in Sweden. The victims were wearing Sweden men's national football team shirts when they were shot. In a video released following the attack, the perpetrator claimed to have been directly targeting Swedes.

== Reactions ==
=== Government reactions ===
- The Swedish government condemned the burning, calling it "Islamophobic" and saying it did not reflect the government's view. The incidents caused a debate in Sweden over freedom of speech and the right to offend, versus what constitutes hate speech under Swedish law. Sweden has said that Russia-backed disinformation networks have been falsely claiming that the Swedish government supported the burnings to undermine Sweden's chances of joining NATO. Swedish police filed preliminary hate crime charges against a man who burned a Quran outside a mosque in Stockholm in June 2023, with Swedish state prosecutors to decide whether to formally indict him or not. If they do indict him, it will be up to a Swedish judge to decide on whether or not his actions constituted incitement under the current law. On 30 July, Swedish Prime Minister Ulf Kristersson said that Sweden was in "the most serious security situation since the Second World War."
- (Denmark) The Danish Foreign Minister Lars Løkke Rasmussen said on 30 July that "the burnings are deeply offensive and reckless acts committed by [a] few individuals. These few individuals do not represent the values the Danish society is built on." The Danish government also said it would try to find legal means to prevent burnings of the Quran in front of other countries' embassies. On 4 August, the government said it was tightening border controls to prevent unwanted individuals from entering the country.
- Afghanistan suspended all Swedish activities, which included Swedish aid worker groups, and said that the ban would remain active until Sweden apologized for their actions.
- In Iran, the Islamic Revolutionary Guard Corps deputy director said it is Iran's duty to punish the violator individual, that the individual should not have security. The Iranian supreme leader Ali Khamenei called for the death penalty for the perpetrator, saying that Sweden had "gone into battle-array for war on the Muslim world". An Iranian Ministry of Intelligence report alleged that Momika was affiliated with Mossad since 2019. Extraterritorial operations Ali Mohammadi-Sirat of said the man who disrespected the Quran should fear for his life. General Salami said you should live in fear even if takes decades. Tehran announced they will build Quran Gate in relation.
- Iraq summoned the Swedish ambassador to the country, calling the Quran‑burning "racist" and "irresponsible". Iraq severed all diplomatic and business ties and connections with Sweden in response. Iraqi cleric Muqtada al-Sadr called on Sweden to strip Momika of his citizenship and repatriate him for prosecution; failing this, al-Sadr said he would be tried in absentia. On 20 July, Iraq expelled the Swedish ambassador in response to another planned Quran burning in Stockholm.
- Jordan described the incident as "a racist act of serious hate".
- Morocco recalled its ambassador to Sweden for an indefinite period.
- Muslims in Pakistan held a "Quran Sanctity Day" on 7 July after the prime minister Shehbaz Sharif called for protests. Speaking to the United Nations Human Rights Council on 11 July, Pakistan's foreign minister Bilawal Bhutto Zardari described the burning of the Quran as an "incitement to religious hatred, discrimination and attempts to provoke violence", done under "government sanction and with the sense of impunity".
- Turkish president Recep Tayyip Erdoğan strongly criticized Sweden for allowing the incident to occur, stating that Turkey would not tolerate any policy of provocation or threat. "We will teach the arrogant Western people that it is not freedom of expression to insult the sacred values of Muslims," he said. This condemnation took place at a strained time between the two countries, as Turkey was delaying Sweden joining NATO, saying that it was not taking enough action against the pro-Kurdish activists and the Gülen movement (designed as a terrorist group by Turkey). In January 2023, the Speaker of the Grand National Assembly of Turkey, Mustafa Şentop also canceled the planned visits to Turkey by the Speaker of the Swedish Parliament, Andreas Norlén and the Speaker of the Finnish Parliament, Matti Vanhanen. On 1 February, President Erdoğan, in his statement regarding the Quran burning events in Sweden, announced that Turkey views Finland's NATO membership positively, but will not view Sweden's membership positively. In late July 2023, Turkey issued an official arrest order against Rasmus Paludan and nine others for having been part Quran-burnings in Sweden that year.
- The Indonesian government, via its Ministry of Foreign Affairs, condemned the burning. The Minister of Foreign Affairs, Retno Marsudi, summoned Sweden's and Denmark's ambassadors to Indonesia on 1 August 2023.
- Egypt's Al-Azhar al-Sharif called on boycotting all the Swedish and Danish products and called the acts of burning an "offense" to Islam and Muslims around the world, and said that boycott would be an appropriate reaction to governments that protect "barbaric crimes under the inhuman and immoral banner they call freedom of expression." The Egyptian Minister of Foreign Affairs Sameh Shoukry strongly condemned it and said that it's a "disgraceful act provokes the feelings of hundreds of millions of Muslims around the world". The Swedish Chargé d'affaires was summoned by the Assistant Minister on European Affairs, Ihab Nasr, who condemned the act of burning during their meeting.
- Kuwait banned imports from nations where Quran desecration is allowed
- (Chechnya) Head of the Chechen Republic, a federal subject of Russia, Ramzan Kadyrov calls for violence against Sweden and Denmark after the Quran burnings. In a message on Telegram, he points out European countries where the Quran was burned. "I call on the leaders of Islamic states to wake up and do everything in their power to protect our religion from crime, otherwise it will be too late," Kadyrov wrote on Telegram. He also questions what Muslim leaders are doing to prevent the situation and why they "allow our holy scriptures to be openly desecrated".
- The United States expressed its disapproval of the burning but also stated that granting permission for the demonstration supported freedom of expression. The US also called for Turkey to allow Sweden to join NATO.
- (Vatican City) Pope Francis condemned the act, telling Al-Ittihad that "any book considered holy should be respected to respect those who believe in it", and that he felt "angry and disgusted" at the Quran-burnings.
- (Israel) Israeli president Isaac Herzog has condemned Sweden for allowing Quran burnings, calling it an "act of pure hate".

=== International organisations ===
On 2 July, the Organisation of Islamic Cooperation said that international law and other collective measures were needed to prevent future incidents involving the desecration of the Quran.

On 12 July, the United Nations Human Rights Council adopted a motion "countering religious hatred constituting incitement to discrimination, hostility or violence" in response to the Quran-burning incident. As with all of the council's decisions, this is not legally binding.

| Yes - 28 | No - 12 | Abstention - 7 |
|---|---|---|
| Algeria | Belgium | Benin |
| Argentina | Costa Rica | Chile |
| Bangladesh | Czech Republic | Georgia |
| Bolivia | Finland | Honduras |
| Cameroon | France | Mexico |
| China | Germany | Nepal |
| Cuba | Lithuania | Paraguay |
| Eritrea | Luxembourg | |
| Gabon | Montenegro | |
| Gambia | Romania | |
| India | United Kingdom | |
| Ivory Coast | United States | |
| Kazakhstan | | |
| Kyrgyzstan | | |
| Malawi | | |
| Malaysia | | |
| Maldives | | |
| Morocco | | |
| Pakistan | | |
| Qatar | | |
| Senegal | | |
| Somalia | | |
| South Africa | | |
| Sudan | | |
| Ukraine | | |
| United Arab Emirates | | |
| Uzbekistan | | |
| Vietnam | | |

=== Swedish authorities ===
In February 2023, the Swedish Police Authority refused permission for "an association and a private person" to burn the Quran outside the Turkish and Iraqi embassies in Stockholm. In June 2023, this refusal was overturned by the Court Appeal in Stockholm. A judge found that the police's fear of security problems was not obvious enough to override the constitutional right of those who planned to burn the Quran to hold what they claimed to be a political demonstration. There is no longer a law against blasphemy in Sweden or Denmark.

On 12 July, the Supreme Administrative Court of Sweden announced that they would hear a case related to a denial of a protest permit from April. On 6 November, the Supreme Administrative Court announced its final judgement affirming a Court of Appeal decision to overturn the denial of the protest permit. The Supreme Administrative Court noted that restrictions on the constitutionally protected freedoms of assembly and demonstration may only be made by law and for certain specifically stated purposes, and that provisions on the limitation of such rights should be interpreted restrictively.

As a result of Momika's killing on 29 January 2025, the Stockholm District Court dropped all charges against him.

=== Danish authorities ===
The Danish Security and Intelligence Service (PET) warned that the series of Quran burnings increased the terrorist threat. In response, Denmark's parliament passed a bill banning the "inappropriate treatment" of religious texts, including the Quran, the Bible, or the Torah, on 7 December 2023. The law applies to both public and private settings if the act is recorded and distributed. Offenders could face a fine or up to two years in jail. Critics, including opposition MPs from the Liberal Alliance and others, argued against the bill, expressing concerns about freedom of speech restrictions. However, the Danish Justice Minister Peter Hummelgaard said that criticising religion and religious satire would remain legal. Some suggested the government's motive was related to securing a seat on the UN Security Council. Two opposition parties, the Danish People's Party and the New Right, called for a referendum on the matter.

== See also ==
- List of book-burning incidents
- Islam and blasphemy
