= Rasmus Paludan =

Danish-Swedish political activist (born 1982)

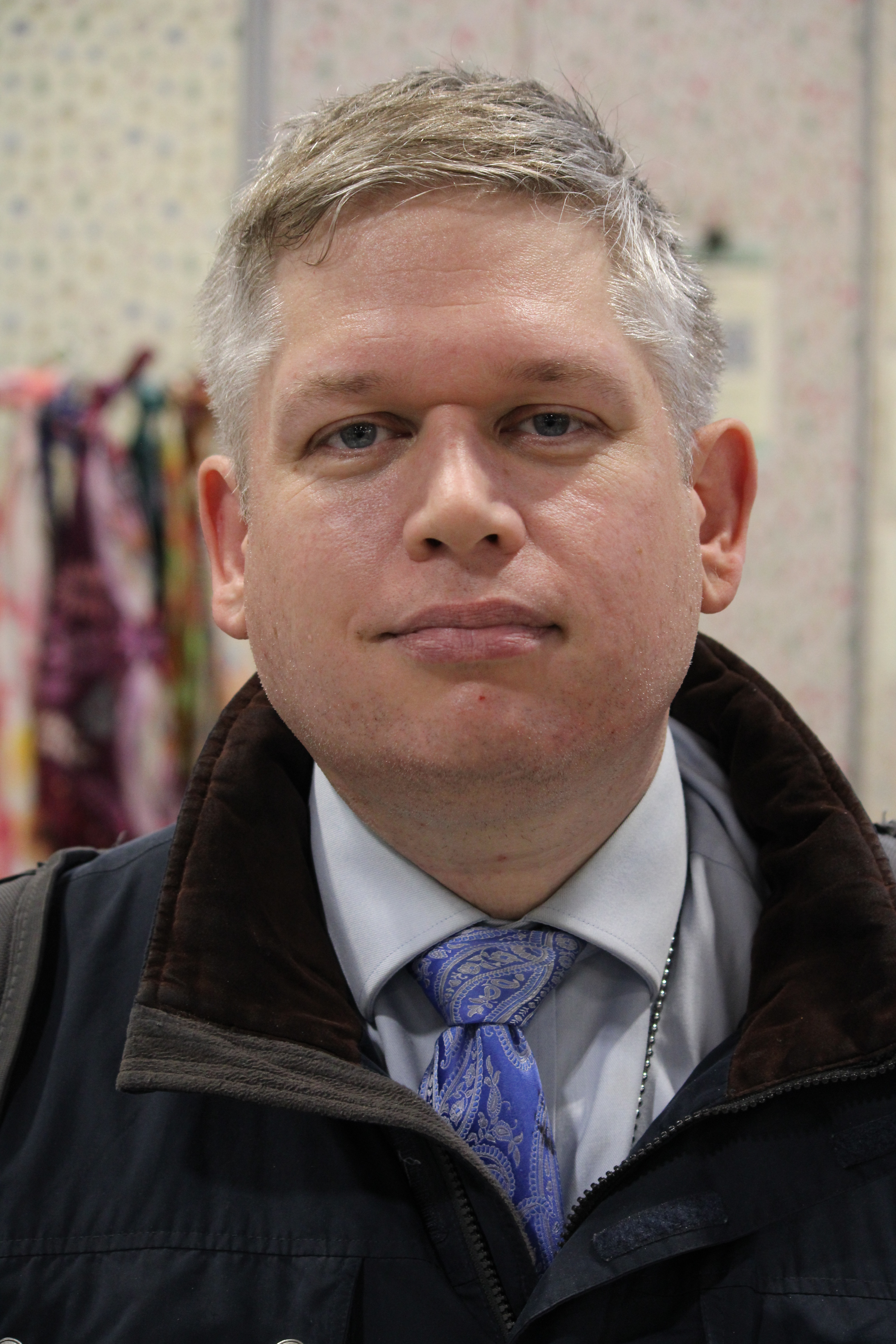
- Paludan in 2025

Leader of Stram Kurs
- Incumbent
- Assumed office 16 March 2017
- Preceded by: Position established

Personal details
- Born: 2 January 1982 (age 44) North Zealand, Denmark
- Citizenship: Denmark; Sweden
- Party: Stram Kurs (since 2017); New Right (2016–17); Venstre (2010); Danish Social Liberal Party (RU) (c. 2003)
- Other political affiliations: Alternative for Sweden (c. 2021); For Frihed (2016–17); June Movement (c. 2009)
- Education: University of Copenhagen (ML)
- Occupation: Activist, lawyer, politician

Rasmus Paludan (born 2 January 1982) is a Danish-Swedish politician and lawyer, who is the founder and leader of the far-right, nationalist, Danish political party Stram Kurs. Paludan has become known for his extremist views, including that Islam should be banned and that immigrants of non-Western background should be deported from Denmark. He is considered by political scientists and media to be far-right (Note: Sources describing Paludan as far-right include:) and a right-wing extremist. (Note: Sources describing Paludan as right-wing extremist include:)

Paludan is known for his Islamophobic and Islam-critical events and demonstrations, which are often held in urban areas with many Muslim immigrants, initially in Denmark. During the demonstrations, he has called the Quran "the big book of whores" and Islam "gay Islam". He has also burned, spat on and thrown the Quran and encouraged people to urinate on it. Paludan has particularly attracted attention by recording videos of his demonstrations and uploading them to the Stram Kurs party's YouTube channel. In 2020, the channel was shut down by YouTube, citing that their guidelines prohibit harassment and hate speech directed at individuals or groups based on race or religion. His burnings of the Quran led to rioting in Sweden in 2022, and burnings in 2023 were said to have started what caused "an enormous global controversy".

Paludan has been a defence attorney in several cases with press attention. Paludan has also been involved in and subject to a number of lawsuits, legal disputes, and criminal charges. In 2019, he was sentenced to 14 days conditional imprisonment for violating the Danish racism clause. In 2021, he was found guilty of racist and derogatory statements, received a conditional sentence of 3 months in prison, and had to pay compensation to the offended, a Somali woman.

As of 2020, Paludan was under constant police protection due to threats against him for his activity.

== Background and education ==
Paludan was born in North Zealand and grew up in Hornbæk, Denmark. Rasmus Paludan is the brother of poet Tine Paludan and writer Martin Paludan, who was a former social media manager for The Alternative. Paludan's mother married his Swedish father, Tomas Polvall, in 1979 thereby acquiring the right to Swedish citizenship. Paludan became a student at Helsingør Gymnasium in 2000, where he was student council chairman for a period. After high school he served his military service. Paludan began studying law in 2001 and in 2008 became a Master of Laws from the University of Copenhagen. Paludan had the year's ninth highest grade point average after his Bachelor of Arts. However, he was involved in a road accident in 2005, which delayed his law studies. During his studies, he worked for Kromann Reumert in 2004 and the following year was an intern with the chief prosecutor of the International Criminal Court in The Hague. In 2014, Paludan was commissioned as a lawyer with the right to appear before the High Court. From 2015 to 2018, Paludan was employed as an external lecturer at the Faculty of Law at the University of Copenhagen, where several students complained to the student management about Paludan's teaching and behaviour.

Both of Pauldan's siblings have publicly distanced themselves from his political messages and methods. Paludan has stated that those who know him know that he is "out of category". Paludan has described himself as principled and added that he is so to such an extent that it has probably limited his circle of friends.

Paludan suffered a brain injury in a road accident in 2005, which has been claimed in court documents to have resulted in subsequent significant personality changes, including the lack of ability to tolerate others' mistakes, depression, as well as a 25 percent loss of work ability. Paludan's father, however, rejects the idea that the accident caused any significant mental changes in his son.

In 2020, Paludan founded the Church of Saint James the Moor-slayer with himself as Archbishop, named after the Spanish legendary figure James Matamoros who helped the Christians conquer the Muslim Moors as part of the Reconquista. He also attempted to register the church in Sweden in 2022. In August 2022, Paludan was accepted to study theology at the University of Copenhagen, but stated that he did not want to become a priest of the Church of Denmark, since he is already Archbishop of his own church.

== Political career ==
=== Former affiliations ===
Paludan has been a member of the Danish Social Liberal Youth and, according to the news agency Ritzau, sat on the organisation's main board in 2003, which has however been publicly denied by Rasmus Paludan himself, who stated that he was only on its board in Copenhagen. Paludan has also been a member of the Danish Social Liberal Party and in 2010 of Venstre. In 2009, Paludan ran for the European Parliament for the June Movement without being elected. In 2016, Paludan started attending meetings of the International Free Press Society. In November 2016, he was appointed as a member of the Lars Vilks Committee. In January 2017, Paludan said that he was a member of and a lawyer for the far right Islam-critical association For Frihed (formerly Pegida Denmark). Paludan has on several occasions given speeches at the association's events and participated in the association's demonstrations.

In January 2017, Paludan said that he had been a member of the political party New Right since September 2016. Paludan was nominated by the party as a candidate for Copenhagen's Citizens' Representative on 28 January 2017. Some days later Paludan had to leave the party after its leadership became aware of a controversial speech Paludan had given at a demonstration organized by the association For Frihed in October 2016; in the speech, Paludan predicted civil war-like conditions in Denmark as a result of an invasion from "foreign enemies". According to the New Right's chairman, Pernille Vermund, Paludan had called for violence with the speech. Peter Seier Christensen, who is a co-founder of the party, also stated that he found the speech completely unacceptable.

"Our streets and alleys will be turned into rivers of blood, and the blood of the foreign enemies will end up in the sewers where the foreigners belong."

— Rasmus Paludan, speech for For Frihed, October 2016

Subsequently, Paludan reported that he had joined the nationalist party Danish Unity. However, Paludan was never accepted into the party, as it found several of his statements "out of step with Danish Unity's basic view".

=== Stram Kurs ===
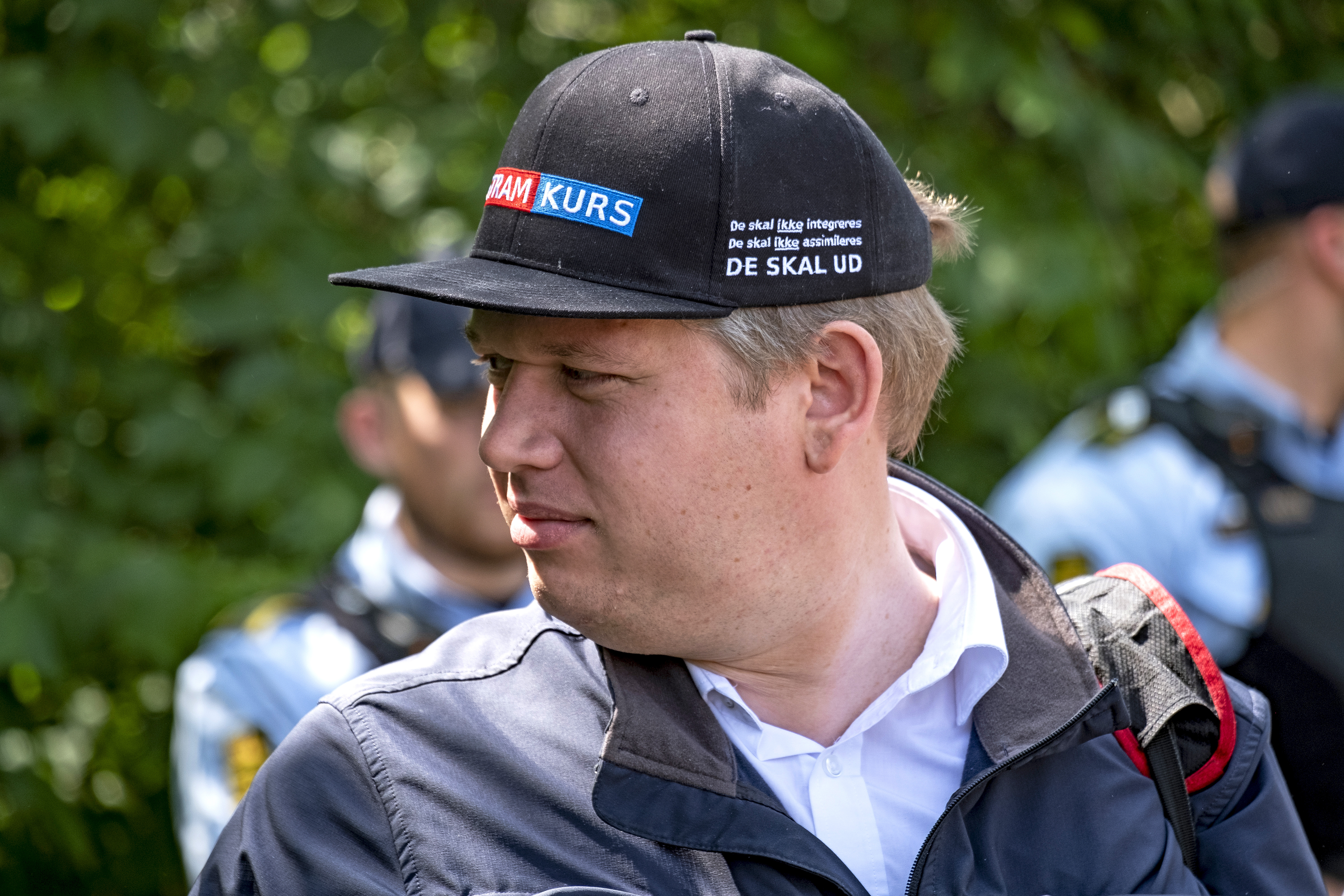
Paludan while campaigning for Stram Kurs in 2019

In July 2017, Paludan founded the Stram Kurs party. The party's main issues include a ban on Islam and the deportation of up to half a million non-Western citizens. In 2017, Paludan ran for Stram Kurs in the municipal elections in Copenhagen without getting enough votes for a place in the Citizens' Representation.

After disturbances at Paludan's demonstration in Nørrebro in Copenhagen in April 2019 gave him massive press coverage, the party collected the necessary number of signatures to become eligible for the 2019 general election. The Copenhagen Post noted in May 2019 that "Paludan has become a paladin for some and sits at an astonishing 2.6 percent in the polls". Paludan and Stram Kurs received a lot of attention during the election campaign and obtained 63,114 votes, corresponding to 1.79% of the votes cast, slightly below the threshold of 2%. Paludan was the party's leading candidate in the Zealand constituency and received just under 10,000 personal votes. With his popularity among youth on YouTube, if only those aged 18 to 24 voted in the election, Stram Kurs would have received 11 representatives in parliament according to a poll. In December 2019, Paludan was ranked number 18 on Politiken's list of opinion leaders of the year.

=== Election results ===
Election	Constituency	Votes	Result	Ref.
2017 municipal elections	Copenhagen	85	Not elected	
2017 regional elections	Capital Region	243	Not elected	
2019 general election	Zealand	9.959	Not elected	

== Political activities ==
=== Early activities ===
One of the first times Paludan noticed himself in the media was in 2007, when he launched a website, on which he published pictures of cyclists and pedestrians who violated the traffic law. Paludan said he did it to reduce the number of people killed in traffic and to make people think twice. In August 2007, Paludan was knocked down by a cyclist he had photographed. The website no longer exists.

In 2008, it was reported in Jyllands-Posten that Paludan had reported a 21-year-old man to the police under Section 266 b of the Criminal Code for making offensive statements about homosexuals in a Facebook group.

In February 2016, Paludan brought a gun dummy to a meeting of the Lars Vilks Committee at Christiansborg. Paludan later said that it was part of the artwork Toys at Christiansborg; the work was intended to illustrate that the police react excessively to harmless incidents, while at the same time, they react unsatisfactorily to real terrorist threats. Paludan was questioned by the police but got his dummy back without being charged. Paludan said he had erected a similar piece of art in a shopping mall in Orange County, California; here he was interrogated by the police and also expelled from the shopping centre for five years.

=== Voice of Freedom ===
In January 2017, Paludan introduced the media channel Voice of Freedom (Frihedens Stemme). The media is registered with the Press Board, and Paludan is its editor-in-chief. The Voice of Freedom also had a YouTube channel, and in a series of videos for the channel, Paludan has posed in front of the Youth House and other known sites associated with the radical left in Nørrebro in Copenhagen. In the videos, threatening situations occur, which lead Paludan to flee and call the police.

"I see it as a civic duty to stand up in places where you cannot speak your mind for fear of being assaulted. And I feel that there has been a change. When I used to line up in front of BumZen in Baldersgade, I was attacked. I continued until I wasn't attacked, and this year I gave a speech in front of BumZen on the anniversary of the clearing of the Youth House, without anything happening. But it might have helped that there were 20 officers."

— Rasmus Paludan, B.T., August 2018

On 25 January 2017, Paludan appeared at the People's House in Nørrebro to interview participants in the left-wing assembly, where one of the items on the agenda was a discussion of "the militant resistance". Paludan was told to leave the area and had to flee from shelling and threats of violence. The Copenhagen Police subsequently ordered Paludan not to approach the People's House for the next twelve hours for his own safety.

=== Stram Kurs Quran-burnings ===
During 2018, Paludan became an internet phenomenon by holding a number of controversial demonstrations and uploading videos of them to YouTube. Paludan has especially organised demonstrations in the country's "vulnerable residential areas", where he has made hostile statements about Islam, has spat on, thrown and burned the Quran and encouraged people to urinate on it and has featured satirical drawings of Muhammad. Paludan has, for instance, referred to the Quran as "the great book of whores" and Islam as "gay Islam". Many of the moves have been recorded and posted on Stram Kurs' YouTube channel, which as of April 2019 had more than 300 videos, some of which had been viewed over a hundred thousand times, with about 25 million total views in June, which was more than all other Danish political parties combined. The YouTube videos have especially experienced popularity with children and young people, who can also often be seen in the background at the demonstrations. In 2020, the channel was shut down by YouTube, citing that their guidelines prohibit harassment and hate speech directed at individuals or groups based on race or religion.

Paludan burning a Quran under police protection in Nørrebro, Copenhagen in 2019

In April 2019, Paludan held a demonstration in Viborg, which led to chaos with the presence of about one hundred counter-protesters. Three people were arrested, and in June 2019, a 24-year-old Danish-Syrian man was sentenced to 60 days in jail, deportation, and a ban from returning to Denmark for six years for having thrown a rock at Paludan.

Paludan's statements and methods have met with criticism from a number of politicians and media persons, while several of these have, however, defended his actions as a part of his right to express himself. During one of Paludan's demonstrations in Nørrebro in April 2019, a counter-protest occurred, after which disturbances arose and several people were arrested. In connection with this, the then Prime Minister of Denmark, Lars Løkke Rasmussen, tweeted that he strongly distanced himself from Paludan's provocations, but called for meeting them with arguments rather than violence. Several parliamentary politicians tweeted similar messages, including the then Minister of Foreign Affairs, Anders Samuelsen, the then Minister of Justice, Søren Pape Poulsen, the then chairman of the judicial committee, Peter Skaarup, and political leader, Pernille Skipper.

In June 2020, Paludan held a demonstration in Aarhus, when a 52-year-old man pulled out a knife, entered the cordoned-off area, and ran towards Paludan. Police fired a warning shot, but the assailant did not lay down his weapon, whereupon police opened fire and wounded the assailant in the leg. In the aftermath, there was unrest in the area, in which police were hit by fireworks and rocks that were thrown by other assailants in the Gellerup area.

=== Quran-burnings in Sweden ===
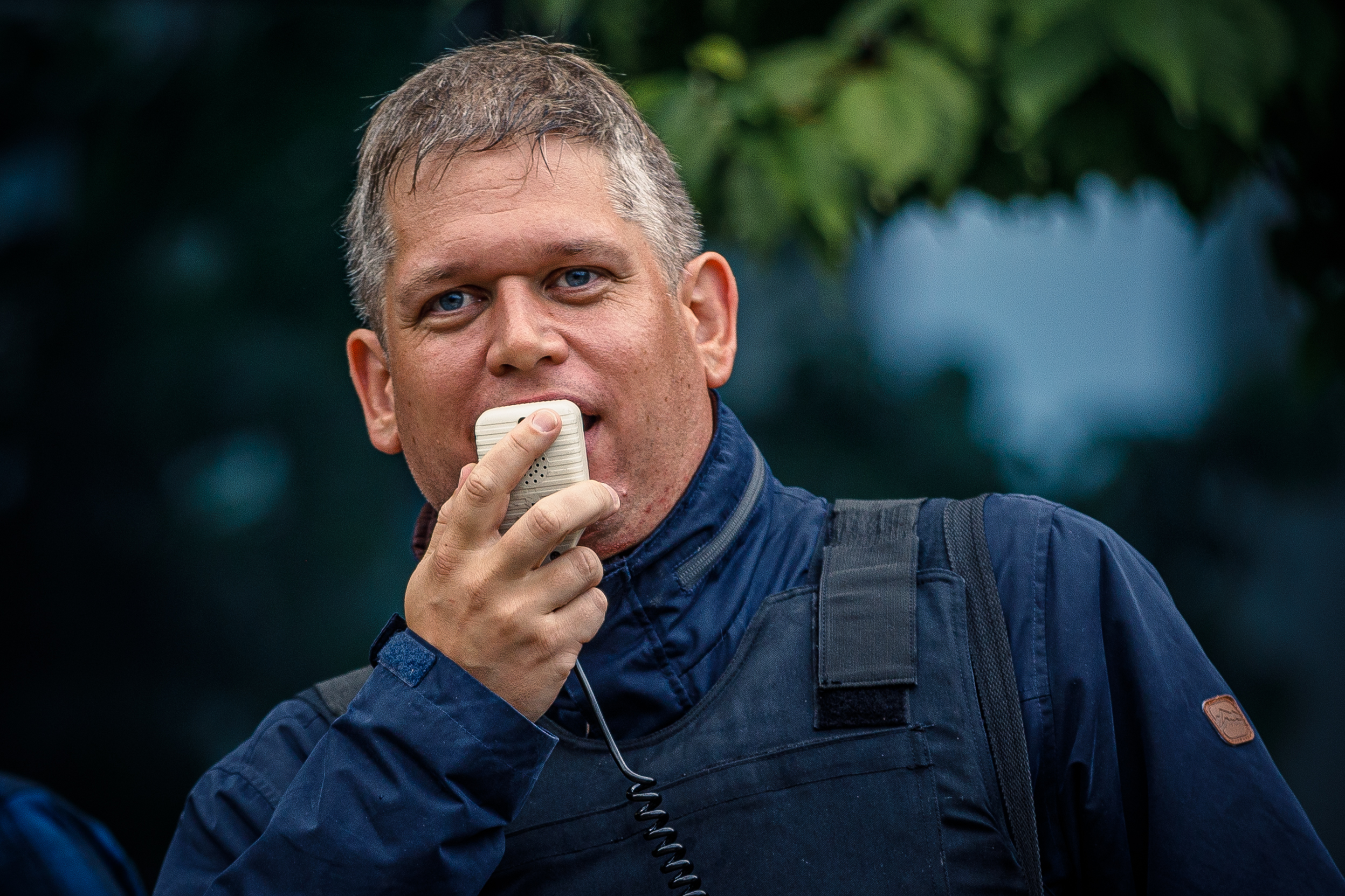
Paludan campaigning in Sweden in 2022, wearing a bulletproof vest

In connection with a planned Quran burning in Malmö, Sweden in August 2020, Paludan was banned from entering Sweden for two years, but in October he was granted Swedish citizenship due to his father's citizenship. His supporters then burned a Quran, which led to riots.

Paludan had his Swedish citizenship confirmed in 2020 and thus obtained the right to stand in the Swedish parliamentary elections. In February 2022, Paludan stated that he planned to stand for the parliamentary elections in September. Paludan soon after began to hold a series of demonstrations in Sweden, while Stram Kurs worked in parallel to become eligible for registration in Denmark. In April 2022, violent disturbances occurred in connection with his demonstrations in Rinkeby, Örebro, Linköping and Norrköping. The unrest was condemned by Sweden's then Prime Minister, Magdalena Andersson, who at the same time defended Paludan's right to speak. Other Swedish parliament members, including Johan Pehrson and Jimmie Åkesson, also expressed condemnation of the violent reactions.

=== Quran-burning in front of the Turkish embassy ===
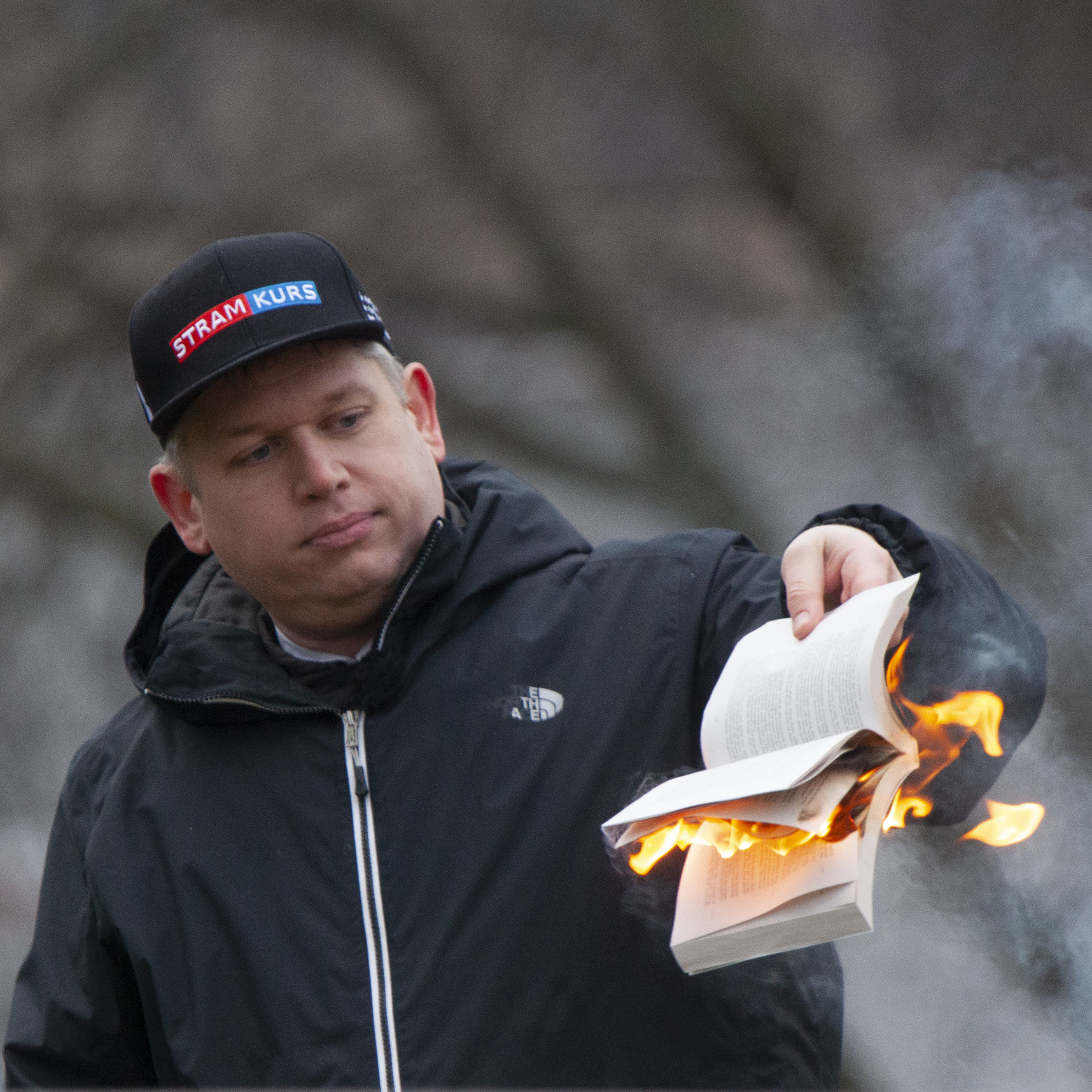
Paludan burning a Quran outside the Turkish embassy in Stockholm in January 2023

On 21 January 2023, Paludan burned a Quran in front of the Turkish Embassy in Stockholm, which along with other burnings was later said to "have ignited an enormous global controversy". The Quran burning caused Turkey to cancel a Swedish ministerial visit that was supposed to have dealt with Sweden's application for membership in NATO, and demonstrations arose in Turkey, Iraq, Yemen and Jordan, where hundreds of angry protesters burned the Swedish flag and pictures of Paludan. The President of Turkey, Recep Tayyip Erdoğan, stated that Sweden should no longer expect Turkish support for their NATO membership. Swedish membership of NATO requires that all 30 member states approve Sweden's application; Turkey was then the only country that had refused to do so. According to several experts and analysts, Erdogan used the situation to profile himself for the Turkish presidential election in May. Paludan stated on 26 January that he would burn a Quran every Friday in front of the Turkish embassy in Copenhagen until Turkey is ready to ratify Sweden's application for NATO membership.

In July 2023, a court in Ankara, Turkey, officially issued an arrest warrant for Paludan for "publicly insulting religious values" as a result of having burned a Quran in front of their embassy. He received threats from Islamic State supporters in response to the burning of the Quran, which they perceived as a declared war by the West against Islam, and vowed revenge.

=== Arrest warrant in Sweden ===
In May 2023, it was announced that Paludan would be arrested immediately if he set foot in Sweden, as he was investigated for racial hatred offences, insult and gross abuse against a public official. Paludan announced he had no intentions of entering Sweden again.

In November 2024, Paludan was convicted by courts in Sweden for his remarks and was sentenced to up to four months' imprisonment.

=== Ban on burning the Quran in Denmark ===
After the Danish government in 2023 proposed to ban the burning of the Quran, Paludan said he would intensify his "mockery of Islam" in other ways, such as pouring pig's blood and excrement on the Quran outside the ambassador's home. The Danish Folketing was divided on the issue, but voted to ban the burning of the Quran in December 2023, which Paludan described as a "great success".

== Police protection and security ==
Paludan has demonstrated under massive police protection in districts and residential areas such as Vollsmose, Brøndby Strand, Taastrupgaard, Ishøj, Greve and Aalborg Øst, and he has several times worn a bulletproof vest to the demonstrations. Paludan has also received numerous death threats, and in March 2019, a person was charged and remanded in custody for threatening Paludan's life. Two former operational chiefs of the Danish Security and Intelligence Service (PET), Hans Jørgen Bonnichsen and Frank Jensen, assessed in April 2019 that Paludan was in mortal danger as a result of his provocations. Bonnichsen and Jensen also assessed that Paludan's activities contributed to increasing the overall terrorist threat against Denmark's population. In October 2019, Paludan was temporarily banned by the Copenhagen Police from demonstrating in the police district, since the Center for Terror Analysis had assessed the current terrorist threat against Paludan as "very serious" due to a "specific threat". In September 2020, Paludan was put on Al-Qaeda's death list, and according to Paludan, PET therefore chose to tighten security around him.

=== Exposure to violence and vandalism ===
Paludan has been subjected to violence or attempted violence several times in connection with his demonstrations: in April 2019, Paludan was hit in the head by a stone during a demonstration in Viborg; in October 2019, Paludan was evacuated by the police from a demonstration in Tingbjerg, after a series of firecrackers had been fired at him; and in November 2019, a woman was charged with violence after throwing a liquid at Paludan during a demonstration at Nørrebro's Runddel.

In December 2016, Paludan's law office was vandalized. Unknown perpetrators had broken a window and thrown a lit powder extinguisher into the office. The powder extinguisher was secured with gaffer tape, so it remained lit and sprayed a thick layer of powder throughout the office. The unknown perpetrators had written "Fuck Pegida" on the façade of the office, a reference to the association For Frihed, whose name was previously Pegida.

In January 2019, a commotion broke out between Paludan and two men while Paludan was exercising at Amager Fælled. Paludan activated his burglar alarm, but the two men fled on bicycles after one pushed and kicked Paludan. In February 2020, one man was found guilty in the Copenhagen District Court and sentenced to 40 days of probation, while another man was acquitted.

In June 2020, during one of his demonstrations, Paludan was threatened by a man armed with a knife in Gellerupparken in Aarhus. Paludan was evacuated by the police, who shot the man in the leg after firing warning shots. The man was subsequently charged and indicted for attempted murder, just as another man was indicted for complicity in the same. On 8 February 2021, the two men were acquitted of attempted murder, but convicted of violence under section 245 subsection 1.

=== Debate on police resources ===
Police protection of Paludan had, from 1 January 2019, until the general election on 5 June of that year cost 100 million kr. According to a statement from the National Police, the police protection cost six million kroner in the period 1 January to 7 April, while the costs on 29 April had seven-folded to about 41 million. The cost of police protection of Paludan has been debated several times in the media by politicians and opinion makers. A number of national newspapers, including Politiken, Berlingske, Jyllands-Posten, Information, Ekstra Bladet and B.T., argued in leading articles in favour of Paludan's right to freedom of expression and religious criticism following the unrest in connection with a demonstration at Nørrebro in April 2019. However, Kristeligt Dagblad wrote that freedom of speech has and should have boundaries and that the abolished blasphemy paragraph could have been "an instrument to protect public order". In addition to newspapers, several members of parliament also engaged with the debate. In September 2018, the spokesman for the Socialist People's Party, Karsten Hønge, stated that the police protection should cease and that Paludan should demonstrate at his own risk. In May 2019, Denmark's then Minister of Justice, Søren Pape Poulsen, stated that it is important to defend Paludan's right to demonstrate, although he is both "uneducated and unsympathetic". Naser Khader, who is a member of parliament for the Conservative People's Party, has also argued for the importance of protecting Paludan.

== Political views ==
=== Characteristics in the media and academia ===
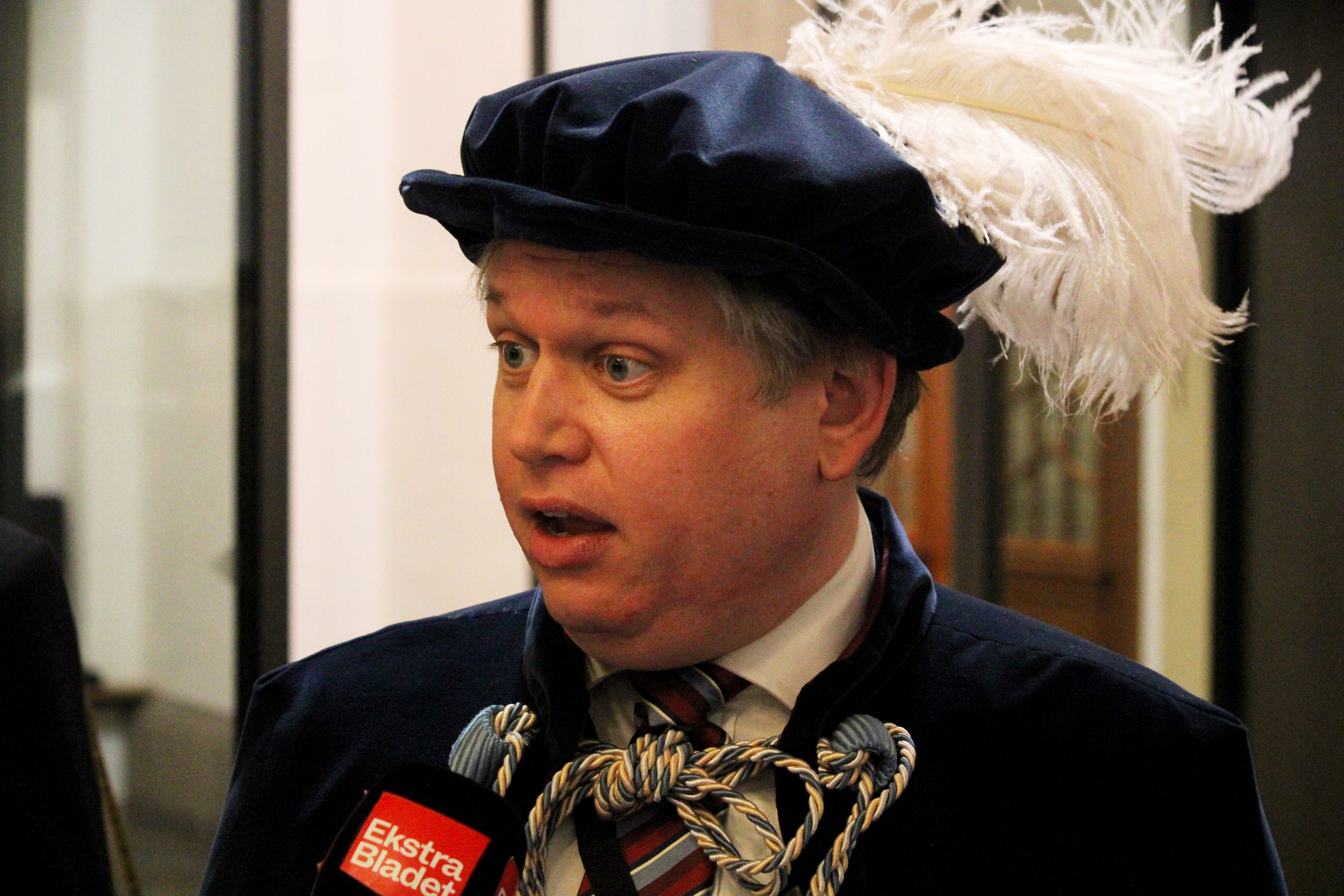
Paludan speaking to Ekstra Bladet on election night 2026

In the media and academia, Paludan has been described as far-right and right-wing extremist. Editor-in-chief of Weekendavisen, Martin Krasnik, in an editorial in May 2019 called Paludan a "Nazi"; this description has been rejected by several historians and was termed by historian Bent Blüdnikow as an "ahistorical and dangerous relativization of historical Nazism" and "an indignity to the victims of Nazism". Historian Claus Bryld stated to Berlingske that he had no problems with Krasnik's use of the word Nazi, but that he himself would probably use the word racist. Lecturer in history at Roskilde University Center Claus Bundgård Christensen, who is also an expert on Nazism, does not believe that Paludan is a Nazi. According to Christensen, the rhetoric that is used does not resemble the rhetoric of the Nazis either, and he instead calls the party leader a "populist demagogue". Against the accusations of being a Nazi, Paludan has said that he has always supported homosexuals and Jews in Denmark, and that as far as he knew, that was not a particularly Nazi view. British The Economist described him in February 2023 as "an attention-hogging far-right Danish politician". Among other things, Paludan has referred to himself as "guardian of society", "soldier of freedom" and "the light of the Danes".

Ideologically, some observers have considered Paludan a counter-jihadist, although he considers himself to be an ethno-nationalist. Paludan believes that Islam should be banned in Denmark, and a ban is also part of Stram Kurs's political program. According to Paludan, such a ban would not be unconstitutional, since, according to Article 67 of the Constitution, freedom of religion is limited in that "nothing is taught or done that is contrary to morality or public order". Jørgen Albæk Jensen, who is a professor of law at Aarhus University, has assessed a ban on Islam to be in conflict with the mentioned section, and law professor Jens Elo Rytter has assessed that you can potentially ban religious communities, but not a whole religion.

=== Great replacement theory ===
Paludan has warned several times about the Great Replacement, a white-nationalist conspiracy theory that European populations are gradually being replaced by Muslim immigrants and their descendants. Paludan claimed in a party leadership debate during the 2019 general election that the ethnic Danish population is approaching becoming a minority due to a higher birth rate among Muslims in Denmark, and Paludan has claimed on several occasions that it will be a reality within a few decades. According to religion and demography researchers, there is no indication of such a development.

Paludan has called for putting expelled foreign citizens unwilling and unable to travel back to their country in detention camps in North-Eastern Greenland. In 2019 he ran for election on a platform of deporting up to 700,000 people of immigrant origin from Denmark.

== Legal issues ==
Paludan has been involved in a number of lawsuits and legal disputes; he himself has been sued at various courts and has also been behind several lawsuits and complaints himself. Jacob Mchangama, who is the director of the legal think tank Justitia, has criticized Paludan for operating with double standards for free speech and for bringing "a series of patently baseless libel cases":

Paludan operates with two different standards of freedom of expression: one that applies to himself and which is almost unlimited, and then one that applies to his opponents and which is almost non-existent when it comes to criticism of himself. The fact that he has filed and lost a number of patently baseless libel cases underlines this. So do the threats of imprisonment for "treason" against political opponents.

— Jacob Mchangama, Berlingske

=== Complaints against the police ===
Paludan has voiced criticism of the police and the lawyers employed by them, just as he has led a number of complaints against specific officers. In 2007, he described in a debate post how he had experienced several officers acting in a critical manner. In the debate article, Paludan assessed that the vast majority of police officers were psychopaths. In 2008, Paludan founded the association Danish Center for Complaints about the Police to combat the current police complaint system. Paludan has filed at least 18 complaints against specific officers without success, and he has sought access to the personnel information of at least 81 police officers and 16 police prosecutors. Chairman of the Police Association, Claus Oxfeldt, and chairman of the National Police Association, Jørgen Olsen, have described Paludan's actions as harassment and deliberate abuse.

=== Own lawsuits ===
In 2004, Paludan filed a civil lawsuit against Rasmus Paludan Malver, then a member of Young Conservatives, for calling himself Rasmus Paludan in, among other things, a reader's letter and a debate forum. Malver was partially acquitted, but convicted for having used the username "Paludan" in the Young Conservative debate forum, since according to the name legislation at the time, one was not allowed to use one's middle name as a surname.

In 2006, Paludan sued two members of the Young Conservatives for libellous statements. In a debate post on the organization's website, they had called Paludan "neurotic" and "a nasty slick boy". In the Eastern High Court, the two members were sentenced to two daily fines of 500 kr.

=== Criminal proceedings against him ===
==== Sentence for insulting accusation ====
In 2015, Paludan was fined ten daily fines of 400 kr in the Eastern High Court for insulting a police assistant from the Copenhagen Police. In connection with a restraining order case, Paludan wrote three e-mails to the police assistant; in the emails, Paludan called the police assistant a "criminal snot puppy" and "fascist stormtrooper", among other things. During the case, excerpts of statements from a neuropsychological examination, a psychiatric specialist's statement and a preliminary neuropsychological examination were presented. The investigations showed that a brain injury sustained in a traffic accident in 2005 had left Paludan with a 25 per cent degree of disability and a 25 per cent loss of working capacity. Paludan explained in court that the injury had caused a behaviour change that made it difficult for him to tolerate the mistakes of others without becoming very frustrated himself.

==== First conviction for racism ====
In April 2019, Paludan was sentenced at the Court in Glostrup to a 14-day suspended prison sentence for violating Section 266 b of the Criminal Code, also known as the racism section, after having linked Africans with low intelligence in a YouTube video. Paludan stated in the video:

Yes, when you, like [Bwalya Sørensen] and like most blacks in South Africa, are not gifted enough to be able to see how things actually are, it is much easier to only see in black and white and, as I said, to blame to the whites.

— Rasmus Paludan

The court also assessed that the video was an expression of propaganda, which according to the law is an aggravating circumstance. Paludan appealed to the Eastern High Court, which upheld the sentence on 4 July.

==== Second sentence for racism and other offences ====
In June 2020, Paludan was indicted for 14 offenses by the State Attorney in Copenhagen. The charges related to racism, defamation and reckless driving. On 25 June, Paludan was found guilty of all charges by the Court in Næstved and sentenced to three months in prison, of which one month was suspended. In addition to the prison sentence, Paludan was deprived of his driving license for one year, deprived of the right to lead criminal cases as a lawyer for three years and sentenced to a fine of 8,500 kr as well as ordered to pay 30,000 kr in compensation to the injured party in the defamation case. Paludan subsequently said that he would appeal the sentence. The Eastern High Court found Paludan guilty on 2 September 2021 but made the entire prison sentence conditional, reduced the compensation to 5,000 kr and did not deprive Paludan of the right to conduct criminal proceedings. The High Court upheld the unconditional revocation of the driving license and the traffic fine of 8,500 kr.

==== Restraining order ====
In 2013, Paludan was issued a restraining order by the Copenhagen Police against seeking out a former fellow student from the Latin studies at the University of Copenhagen. The five-year restraining order was issued after Paludan had harassed the fellow student for several years. According to Berlingske, the harassment consisted of phone calls, letters, text messages, physical harassment, seeking out the student's family members and circulating letters with derogatory information about the student.

==== Entry ban in Sweden ====
In August 2020, upon arrival at the border control in Lernacken, Paludan was refused entry to Sweden and was banned from entering Sweden for two years by the police in Malmö for reasons of national security. The police had previously refused Paludan permission to hold a demonstration in Malmö for reasons of order and security. Paludan was later recognized as a Swedish citizen by the Migration Board and therefore cannot be refused entry.

==== Police report for indecency against minors ====
On 27 August 2021, the Danish newspaper Ekstra Bladet reported that Paludan was the owner of a server on the digital platform Discord, wherein he had spoken about sexual acts, read sexually explicit stories, as well as shared pictures of devices meant for genital torture with the members of the server. Several members of this server were minors, the youngest reportedly being aged 13. In response to this, Save the Children reported him to the police for indecency. Paludan denies the charges against him.

==== Ban from the United Kingdom ====
On 20 March 2023, Paludan was banned from entering the United Kingdom, after stating he would burn a copy of the Quran in the city of Wakefield during an upcoming visit in support of four pupils at a Wakefield school who had been suspended over damaging a Quran.

== Law firm ==
Paludan has since 2014 worked as an independent lawyer and has been a defender of the self-proclaimed freedom activist Lars Kragh Andersen – who in 2015 received a 30-day suspended sentence for, among other things, publishing social security numbers belonging to the then Prime Minister, Helle Thorning-Schmidt, and the then Minister of Defense, Nicolai Wammen – and has also been a defender of the provocative artist Uwe Max Jensen, who is friends with Paludan privately and has also been a candidate for Stram Kurs. Paludan has also led a number of cases on the use of medical cannabis.

In 2017, Paludan was appointed to defend a 42-year-old North Jutland man who, as the first in 46 years, stood accused of blasphemy, after he had burned a copy of the Quran in his garden and published a video of the act on Facebook. However, the case did not go to court when the Danish Parliament decided in June 2017 to abolish the blasphemy clause.

Paludan has been asked several times to address the fact that he has been a lawyer for asylum seekers, while he has publicly argued against immigration. Paludan has rejected the criticism, explaining that his goal as a lawyer is to fight for the client and that a defence lawyer does not have to be a supporter of murder to be able to defend a person accused of manslaughter. Paludan has further said that he has only been a lawyer for a foreigner deprived of his liberty when that person has asked for him. Paludan was in three cases between 2016 and 2018 appointed as a lawyer for African asylum seekers.

In 2017, Paludan was twice fined by the Bar Association for violating good legal practice. The reason was that, in connection with several cases, Paludan had called named police officers and prosecutors corrupt, possible criminals and high-level amateurs. Paludan appealed both decisions to the district court, which upheld them in May 2019. Paludan appealed the district court's decision, but it was upheld by the Østre Landsret in December 2020.

== See also ==
- Salwan Momika
