= Killing of Salwan Momika =

2025 murder in Södertälje, Sweden

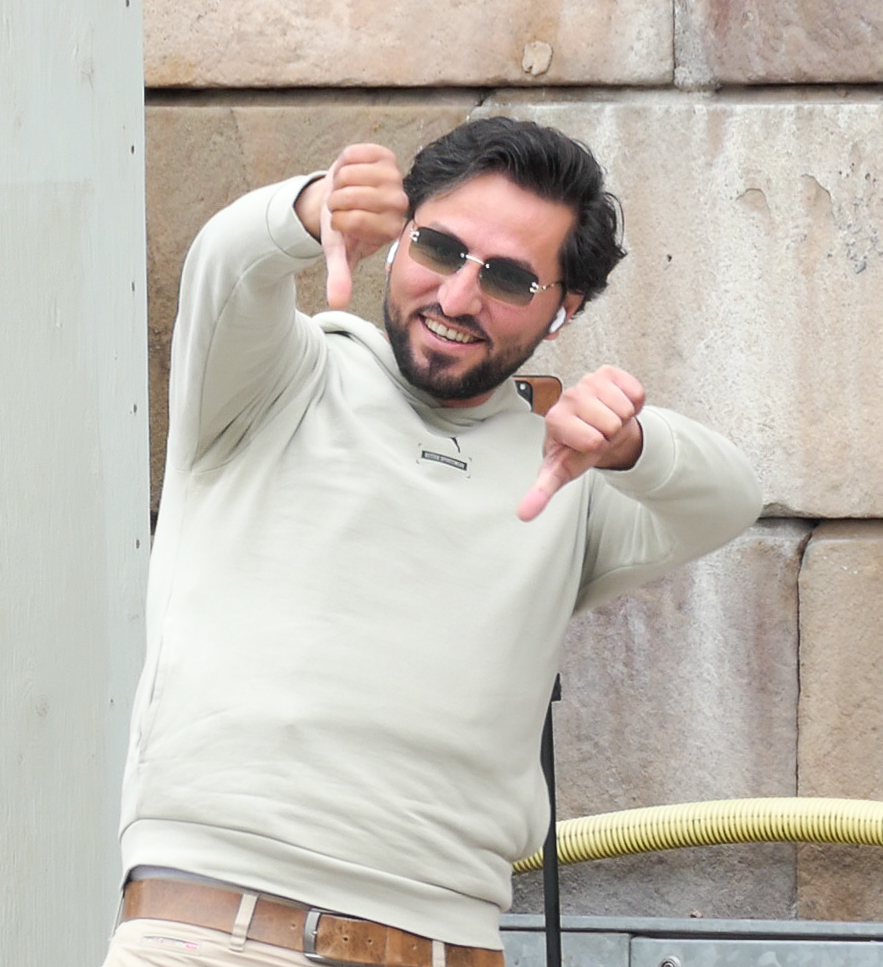
- Momika in 2023
- Location: Hovsjö, Södertälje, Sweden
- Date: 29 January 2025; 23:11 (UTC+01:00)
- Attack type: Assassination by shooting
- Weapon: Handgun
- Motive: Unknown
- Accused: Bashar Zakkour (in absentia)

On 29 January 2025, Salwan Momika, an Iraqi refugee residing in Sweden known for controversial Quran burnings that sparked international diplomatic tensions, was assassinated in Södertälje. The shooting and subsequent police response occurred during a TikTok livestream, and occurred hours before a scheduled court verdict regarding his anti-Islamic demonstrations was to be announced.

On 16 October 2025, Swedish court documents identified a 24-year-old Syrian man named Bashar Zakkour, who lived in Sweden, as a suspect. The suspect's location is currently unknown.

== Background ==
Momika came from the Al-Hamdaniya district of Qaraqosh, a town in the northern Iraqi province of Nineveh. He was an ethnic Assyrian and raised as a Syriac Catholic.

In 2017, Momika fled to Germany with a Schengen visa, where he announced his atheism and apostasy from Christianity. In April 2018, Momika applied for a refugee visa to Sweden, and he was since then, registered as an Iraqi refugee until April 2021 when he was granted a three-year temporary residence permit, which was due to expire in April 2024.

In 2023, Momika arranged a series of demonstrations against Islam. Momika posted dozens of videos online, often with majority-Muslim country names in Arabic as hashtags, prior to the Quran burnings. During these demonstrations, he desecrated the Quran and burned it with police protection and legal permission. The Quran burnings were accompanied by attacks towards Momika. Sweden elevated its national terrorism alert to its second-highest level in 2023, warning of potential threats against Swedish citizens both domestically and internationally following the Quran burnings.

Also in 2023, the Swedish Migration Agency decided that Momika was to be expelled from the country as it had determined that he had provided "misleading" information in his asylum application. The deportation was to be followed by a 5 year entry ban to Sweden. However due to threats against him in Iraq, a court order suspended his expulsion, and he received a new temporary residence permit until April 2024.

In January 2025, Momika was facing charges of "agitation against an ethnic group" related to four incidents from the summer of 2023. His verdict was scheduled to be delivered on 30 January 2025. He had been moved to a secret address while awaiting his verdict. On 1 January, Momika posted a video to his TikTok account describing a Lebanese medium's prediction that he would die in 2024, which he defiantly responded to by stating he would "continue to fight against Islam".

== Assassination ==
Swedish police responded to reports of gunfire at an apartment in the Hovsjö district of Södertälje at approximately 23:11 local time (22:11 GMT) on 29 January 2025. According to eyewitness accounts, multiple shots were fired after someone was heard screaming. Momika was discovered with several gunshot wounds to the head and transported to a hospital, where authorities confirmed his death the following morning.

The shooting and subsequent police response was filmed on a TikTok livestream broadcast by Momika, which over 2,000 people were viewing. According to witnesses who were watching the livestream, he told the audience he was going to his balcony to smoke shortly before a gunshot was heard, followed by four more gunshots. The livestream and police surveillance footage documented officers entering the apartment, mentioning defibrillators, and discovering the phone Momika had been using for his broadcast; they were subsequently recorded ending the livestream.

== Response ==
Prime Minister of Sweden Ulf Kristersson announced that the country's security services were investigating potential links to foreign powers. Deputy Prime Minister Ebba Busch characterized the murder as "a threat to our free democracy", calling for a strong societal response. Swedish Prosecutor Rasmus Oman confirmed the opening of a murder investigation. The Swedish Security Service (SÄPO) became involved in the investigation due to the case's potential involvement of international parties, with a possible state terrorist motive.

Five individuals were arrested in connection with the murder, all of whom were residents of Södertälje ranging in age from their 20s to their 60s. Four of the suspects had no prior criminal record, with the fifth having been convicted of a minor drug offense in 2020. Police made their first arrests two hours after the shooting, taking four suspects located in an apartment adjacent to the crime scene into custody. A fifth arrest occurred at approximately 05:00 following police review of surveillance footage, which showed the suspect departing the area by car shortly after the shooting. Law enforcement reportedly recovered a weapon from the vehicle. At least two of the suspects denied any involvement in the crime in statements relayed through their legal representatives. All five individuals were released on 31 January after prosecutors said that the suspicions they committed a crime had weakened.

As a result of his death, the Stockholm District Court dropped all charges against Salwan Momika and the verdict in the Quran-burning case which now only includes Salwan Najem was postponed until 3 February 2025.

=== Reactions ===
Salwan Najem, who had burned Qurans with Momika and was charged alongside him, posted a TikTok video on the morning of Momika's death stating that he was shocked and scared by the assassination. Najem claimed that he received several death threats from "1,200 Muslims who say [he's] next in line" following Momika's assassination, and that they were both stripped of police protection despite receiving violent threats.

Dutch leader of the Party for Freedom Geert Wilders called Salwan Momika's murder "a bloody shame" and posted a picture of Momika burning a Quran, stating that no one should be killed for the action.

Stockholm University professor of civil law Mårten Schultz described the killing as a significant failure for Sweden's rule of law if religious criticism was the motive. He argued that Momika needed significant police protection due to his dangerous situation, and that Sweden's freedom of expression would be meaningless if it is not protected.

== See also ==
- Stabbing of Salman Rushdie
- 2024 Wakeley church stabbing
- Theo van Gogh (film director)
