= Salwan Momika =

Iraqi refugee and anti-Muslim demonstrator (1986–2025)

- سلوان موميكا ܣܠܘܢ ܡܘܡܝܟܐ
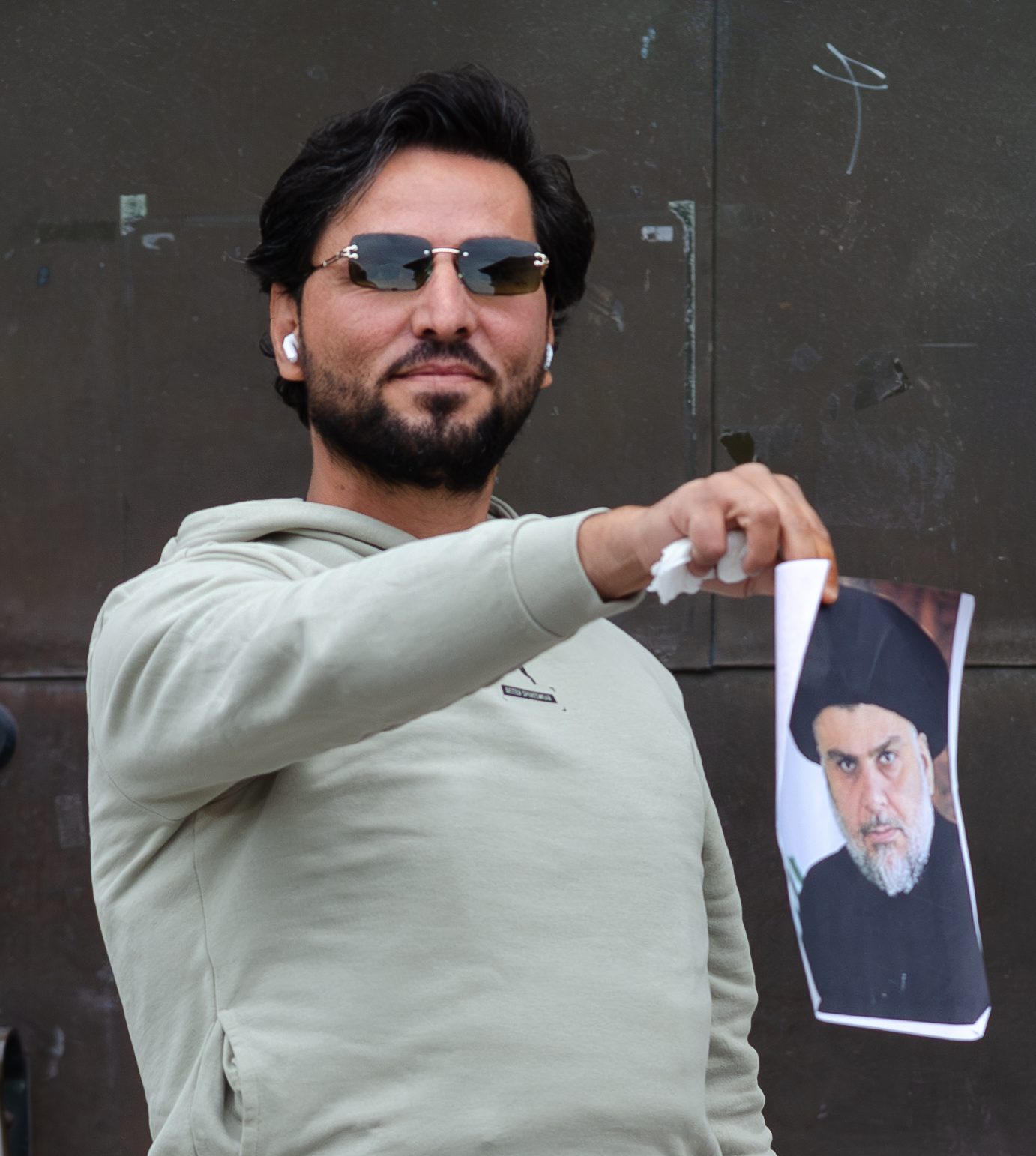
- Momika holding a picture of Muqtada al-Sadr, 2023
- Born: Salwan Sabah Matthew Momika; 23 June 1986; Qaraqosh, Nineveh Governorate, Iraq
- Died: 29 January 2025 (aged 38); Södertälje, Sweden
- Cause of death: Gunshot wound
- Known for: Quran desecrations
- Children: 2
- Military career
- Allegiance: Iraq; Iran (Note: The PMF historically had ties and evidence of allegiance to Iran; this is especially true during the period he served, when it wasn't officially part of the Iraqi armed forces.)
- Branch: Popular Mobilization Forces
- Service years: 2014–2017
- Units: Imam Ali Brigades; Kataib Rouh Allah Issa Ibn Miriam; Syriac Hawks Forces
- Conflicts: War in Iraq (2013–2017)

Salwan Sabah Matthew Momika (Arabic: سلوان صباح متَّى موميكا; Syriac: ܣܠܘܢ ܨܒܚ ܡܬܝ ܡܘܡܝܟܐ; 23 June 1986 – 29 January 2025) was an Iraqi refugee, atheist activist and an ex-paramilitary member of the Popular Mobilization Forces (PMF). While living in Sweden, he gained fame for being an anti-Islam demonstrator who organized public demonstrations where he burnt and desecrated the Quran. Momika was assassinated outside his house on 29 January 2025 during a live broadcast on TikTok.

== Background ==
Momika came from Qaraqosh, (Note: Momika's birthplace has also been wrongly given as Tal Afar, an Iraqi Turkmen city around 111 km from Qaraqosh) a town in the Al-Hamdaniya district in the northern Iraqi province of Nineveh. He was an ethnic Assyrian and raised as a Syriac Catholic. Before the Iraqi civil war, Momika undertook an apprenticeship in tourism and hospitality management in Baghdad. In 2008, when Christians became persecuted by the Islamic State of Iraq (the precursor of ISIS), Momika joined the Assyrian Patriotic Party and worked as a security guard for the party's headquarters in Mosul. According to Iraqi government sources, Momika fled his hometown in 2012 after the local court found him guilty of causing a wrongful death during a car accident and sentenced him to three years of imprisonment in Badush.

After the fall of Mosul to Islamic State (IS) militants in June 2014, Momika joined the Popular Mobilization Forces (PMF) to fight against the IS. He appeared in videos in the uniform of the Assyrian militia Kataib Rouh Allah Issa Ibn Miriam brandishing firearms and pledging allegiance to the Kata'ib al-Imam Ali, a PMF faction and part of the Islamic Movement of Iraq.

It has been alleged that Momika was also affiliated with the Syriac Assembly Movement, a political party that received support from the government of the Kurdistan Region. Momika also founded the Syriac Democratic Union and the Falcons of the Syriac Forces in 2014, an armed militia which was affiliated with the Babylon Brigade, the armed wing of the Babylon Movement. In 2017, Momika was involved in an internal power struggle with Babylon Movement founder Rayan al-Kildani, which he lost. He fled the country as a result.

== Life in Sweden and Quran burnings ==
=== Immigration to Sweden ===
In 2017, Momika fled to Germany with a Schengen visa, where he announced his atheism and apostasy from Christianity. In April 2018, Momika applied for a refugee visa to Sweden, and he was thereafter registered as an Iraqi refugee until April 2021 when he was granted a three-year temporary residence permit, which was due to expire in April 2024. Momika was denied permanent residency, necessary to acquire Swedish citizenship, because he lied in his asylum application by denying that he was in the Imam Ali Brigades, claiming that he was associated with the political branch and not the paramilitary branch of the movement. He was seen in pictures outside the Riksdag along with Robert Halef, a member of the Riksdag for the Christian Democrats. He also had a meeting with Julia Kronlid, a member of the Riksdag for the Sweden Democrats. Momika later stated that he wanted to run for election to the Riksdag as a candidate for the party.

After he was granted a residence permit in Sweden, while still under investigation for his associations with the pro-Iranian militant group, he threatened a man with whom he shared accommodation with a knife, which resulted in him being convicted for unlawful threats the following year. He was sentenced to probation and community service.

=== Quran burnings ===
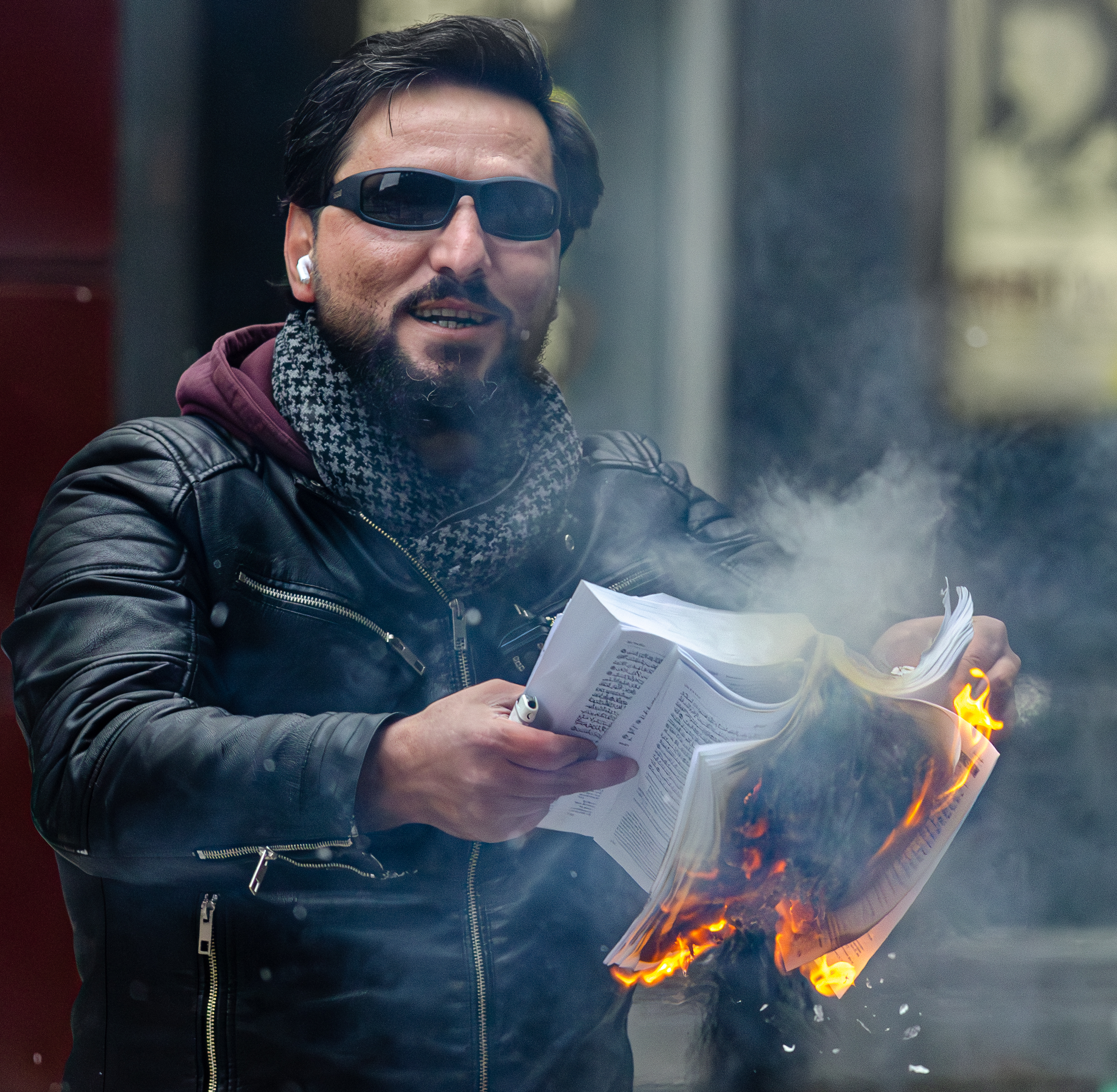
Momika burning a Quran with Spanish tafsir and translation (Note: El Corán en árabe y español con Tafsir y Traducción, ISBN 9798360654230.) in Stockholm, 2023

In summer 2023, planned ahead for that year's date for Eid al-Adha, Momika staged demonstrations in Stockholm and Malmö, during which he burned copies of the Quran, considered desecration in Islam, with legal permission and police protection. The events were livestreamed on social media, with Momika giving his motivation for the book burnings as wanting to advocate for the ban of the Quran. During one such burning of the Quran, he was interrupted by a woman who sprayed him with a fire extinguisher. The first demonstration was watched by around 200 people, mostly hecklers, with Momika posting dozens of videos online, often with majority-Muslim country names in Arabic as hashtags, prior to the Quran burnings.

In early 2024, the Swedish Migration Agency decided that Momika was to be expelled from the country. However, due to threats against him in Iraq, the expulsion could not be exercised, and he thus received a new temporary residence permit until April 2024.

=== Deportation from Norway ===
On 27 March 2024, it was reported that Momika had left Sweden for Norway to seek asylum. Shortly after his departure, there were reports in social media that he had been found dead in Norway, but Norwegian police appeared to deny the rumours. On 4 April, Norwegian police announced they had arrested Momika on 28 March, and that they planned to deport him back to Sweden based on the Dublin Regulation. He was transported back to Sweden on 11 April.

== Assassination ==
Momika was fatally shot on 29 January 2025, at the age of 38. The murder happened at his home in Södertälje during a TikTok livestream. Five arrests have been made in connection with the shooting, according to a Swedish prosecutor. All five individuals were released on 31 January after prosecutors said that the suspicions they committed a crime had weakened. As a result of his death, the Stockholm District Court dropped all charges against Salwan Momika.

Momika's death was met with protests and mixed reactions, with various figures as well as organisations in the Islamic world celebrating his death and conservative politicians in the EU condemning his death as well as the circumstances that made it possible. Momika's death was celebrated by Al-Qaeda's Arabian Peninsula branch, who issued a statement congratulating the Ummah on "the victory of the Qur'an". This sentiment was shared by many Islamists online, with some campaigning online for incitement against Momika in wake of his death.

== See also ==
- Rasmus Paludan
- Theo van Gogh
