= Quran desecration =

Improper treatment of Islam's holy book

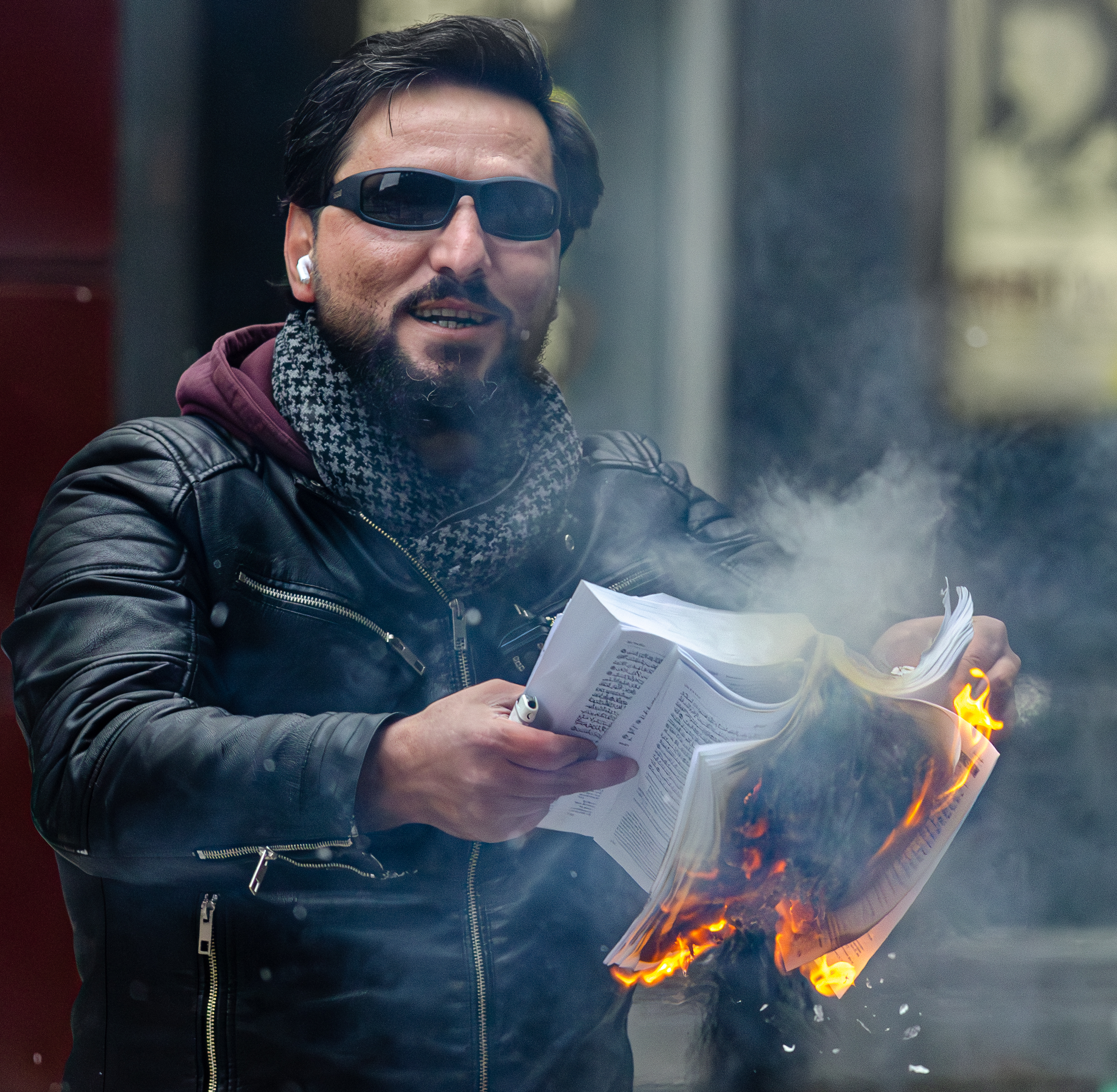
Salwan Momika burning the Quran

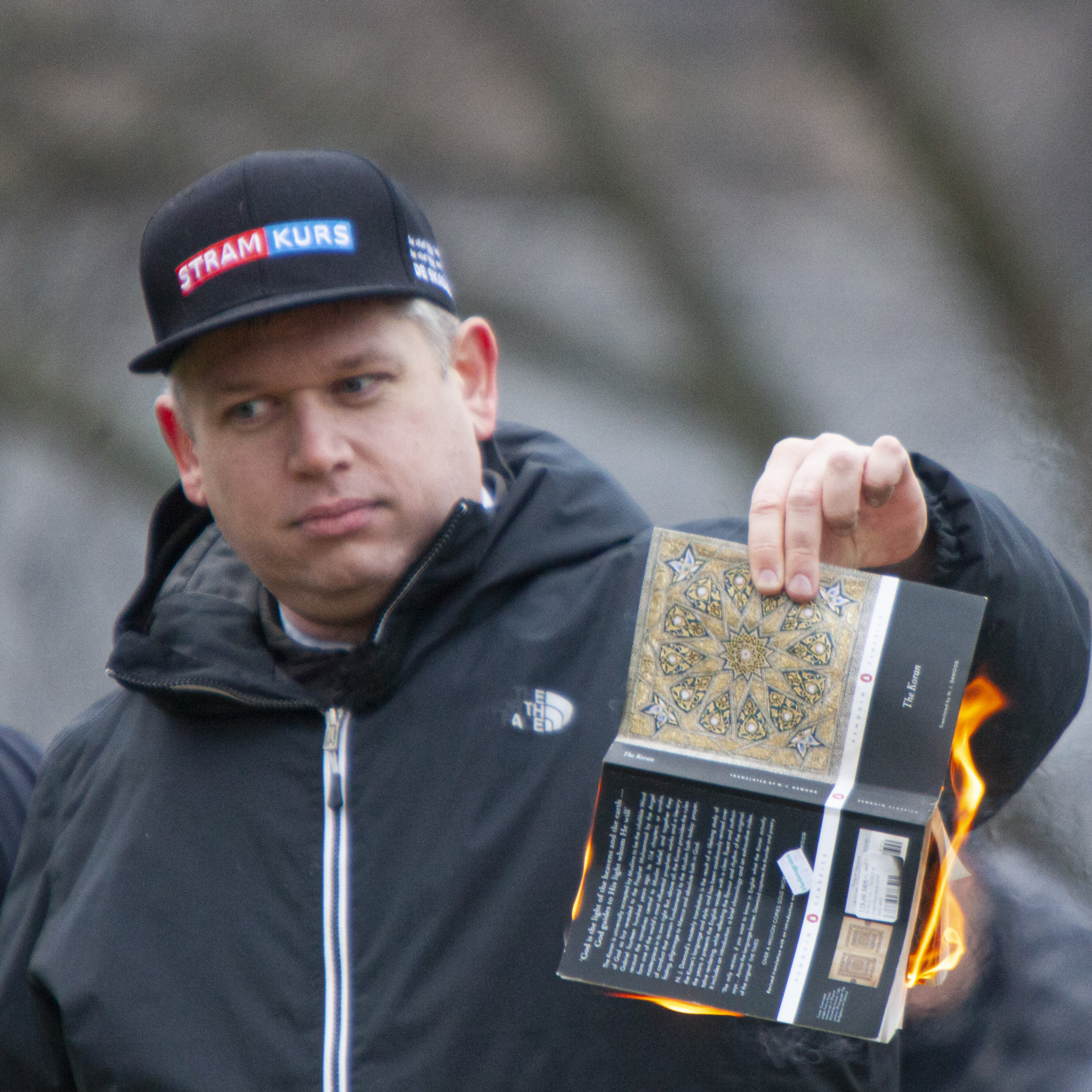
Rasmus Paludan burning a translation of the Quran

Quran desecration is the treatment of the Quran in a way that is intended to be insulting or blasphemous.

In Islamic law, believers must not damage the Quran and must perform a ritual washing before touching it. Conversely, intentional damage to copies is considered blasphemous in Islam. It is a point of controversy whether non-Muslims should be made to follow Islamic law, and a sensitive topic in international relations how it should be handled when Muslims demand adherence to Islamic Quranic practices by nonbelievers.

The disposal of worn copies is also of concern to Muslims. Because the Quran contains no specifics on how to dispose of a worn or defective text, different and conflicting methods of disposal have been adopted in different regions by different sects. According to Islamic historian Michael Cook the Quran should be wrapped in cloth and buried on holy ground where it is unlikely to be trampled on or "safely" placed where it is unlikely to come into contact with impurity. Burning, when carried out respectfully, is also considered acceptable: Saudi Arabia, for instance, destroys Qurans that fall short of state standards by burning to avoid soiling the pages.

The intentional desecration of a copy of the Quran is punishable by imprisonment in Algeria, Belarus, China, Cuba, Egypt, Eritrea, Indonesia, Iraq, Kazakhstan, North Korea, Kuwait, Laos, Lebanon, Libya, Malaysia, Mali, Morocco, Myanmar, Niger, Oman, Qatar, Russia, South Sudan, Sudan, Syria, Tunisia, Turkey, the United Arab Emirates and Venezuela and fines in South Korea and the United Kingdom following criminal prosecution. It is also punishable by death in Afghanistan, Iran, Saudi Arabia, Somalia and Yemen and up to life imprisonment in Bangladesh, Mauritania, Nigeria and Pakistan.

== Notable instances of desecration or controversy ==
=== Pre-1924 Qurans dumped in the Nile ===
Following the printing of the 1924 "royal" edition (amīriyya)" a large number of pre-1924 Qurans were destroyed by dumping them in the river Nile.

=== 2005 – Guantanamo ===
In mid-2005, allegations of deliberate desecration of the Quran in front of Muslim prisoners at the United States military's Guantanamo Bay detention camp in Cuba fueled widespread controversy and led to ensuing Muslim riots. A U.S. military investigation confirmed four instances of Quran desecration by US personnel (two of which were described as "unintentional"), and fifteen instances of desecration by Muslim prisoners. According to CBC News, "The statement did not provide any explanation about why the detainees might have abused their own Holy books." In May 2005, a report in Newsweek, claiming that it was U.S. interrogators who desecrated the Quran at the Guantanamo Bay base, further sparking Muslim unrest.

=== 2010 Dove World Quran-burning controversy ===
In 2010, Christian pastor Terry Jones of the Dove World Outreach Center, a church in Gainesville, Florida, provoked condemnation from Muslims after announcing plans to burn a Quran on the anniversary of the September 11 attacks on the United States. He later cancelled the plans; however, on March 20, 2011, he oversaw the burning of a Quran. In response, Muslims in Afghanistan rioted and 12 people were killed.

In the 2011 Louis Theroux documentary America's Most Hated Family in Crisis, Megan Phelps of the Westboro Baptist Church explained in an interview that they deliberately and publicly burned a copy of the Quran.

=== 2012 – Bangladesh ===
On September 29, an Islamic mob estimated at 25,000 vandalized and torched Buddhist temples, shrines, and houses, along with Hindu temples as incited by an alleged Facebook Buddhist posting of an image depicting the desecration of a Quran. The violence started in Ramu Upazila in Cox's Bazar District and later spread to other areas of Bangladesh.

=== 2012 & 2015 – Afghanistan ===
In February 2012, protests broke out in various parts of Afghanistan over the improper disposal of Qurans at the U.S. military's Bagram Air Base. Protesters shouted "Death to America" and burned U.S. flags. At least 30 people were killed and hundreds injured. Also, six U.S. soldiers were killed after members of the Afghan National Security Forces turned their weapons on them and the Afghan protesters.

On March 19, 2015, Farkhunda Malikzada, a 27-year-old Afghan woman, was publicly beaten and killed by a mob of hundreds of people in Kabul. Farkhunda had previously been arguing with a mullah named Zainuddin, in front of a mosque where she worked as a religious teacher, about his practice of selling charms at the Shah-Do Shamshira Mosque, the Shrine of the King of Two Swords, a religious shrine in Kabul. During this argument, Zainuddin reportedly falsely accused her of burning the Quran. Police investigations revealed that she had not burned anything. A number of prominent public officials turned to Facebook immediately after the death to endorse the murder. After it was revealed that she did not burn the Quran, the public reaction in Afghanistan turned to shock and anger. Her murder led to 49 arrests; three adult men received twenty-year prison sentences, eight other adult males received sixteen year sentences, a minor received a ten-year sentence, and eleven police officers received one-year prison terms for failing to protect Farkhunda. Her murder and the subsequent protests served to draw attention to women in Afghanistan.

=== 2013–2020 – Saudi Arabia ===
In 2013, over 50 copies of the Quran were found in different storm water inlets of the sewage system of the city of Taif, in the Mecca Province of Saudi Arabia. In the same year, there were protests in Saudi Arabia after reports of prison officials in Al-Haer province insulting the Quran.

In 2014, torn copies of the Quran were found in garbage cans in the same city of Taif.

In 2016, Qurans were found to have been put in the garbage by the Embassy of Saudi Arabia in Morocco, causing outrage across Morocco.

In 2017, again, a large number of Quran copies were found in the sewage system of Taif.

In 2019, torn copies of the Quran were found in a trash dump in the city of Khaybar.

In 2020, a man recorded a video of himself desecrating and stepping on the Quran in Saudi Arabia and uploaded the video on social media. The act was widely condemned on social media.

=== 2017–2023 – Denmark ===
Paludan burning a Quran under police protection in Nørrebro, Copenhagen, Denmark in 2019

The legality of burning religious scriptures in Denmark was disputed for a long time, since the act might have been punishable under the country's blasphemy law (which, though on the books, was considered to may have lapsed; for instance, it hadn't been used to prosecute a televised Bible burning in 1997). But the blasphemy law was officially abolished in 2017, after which it became legal to desecrate Qurans and other religious scriptures. Burnings of the Quran, sometimes wrapped in bacon, and other forms of desecration such as ripping the book apart, throwing it in the dustbin were a regular occurrence at rallies of the party Stram Kurs and party leader Rasmus Paludan as well as similar extremist groups. Paludan called on his supporters to pee on the Quran, call it a "shit book", and Muhammad a pedophile murderer.

A small anti-Islam group called the Danish Patriots set fire to Qurans in front of the Turkish and Egyptian embassies in 2023.

In December 2023, Folketinget passed a law to make it illegal to burn, soil, trample on or cut recognised religious scriptures like the Bible, the Torah or the Quran.

=== 2019–present – Norway ===
Since Lars Thorsen became leader of the Stop Islamisation of Norway group in 2019, the group has started repeatedly burning the Quran at their rallies in Norway. The group has also ripped apart and spit on copies of the Quran, and dragged it around on a leash like a dog.

=== 2020–present – Sweden ===
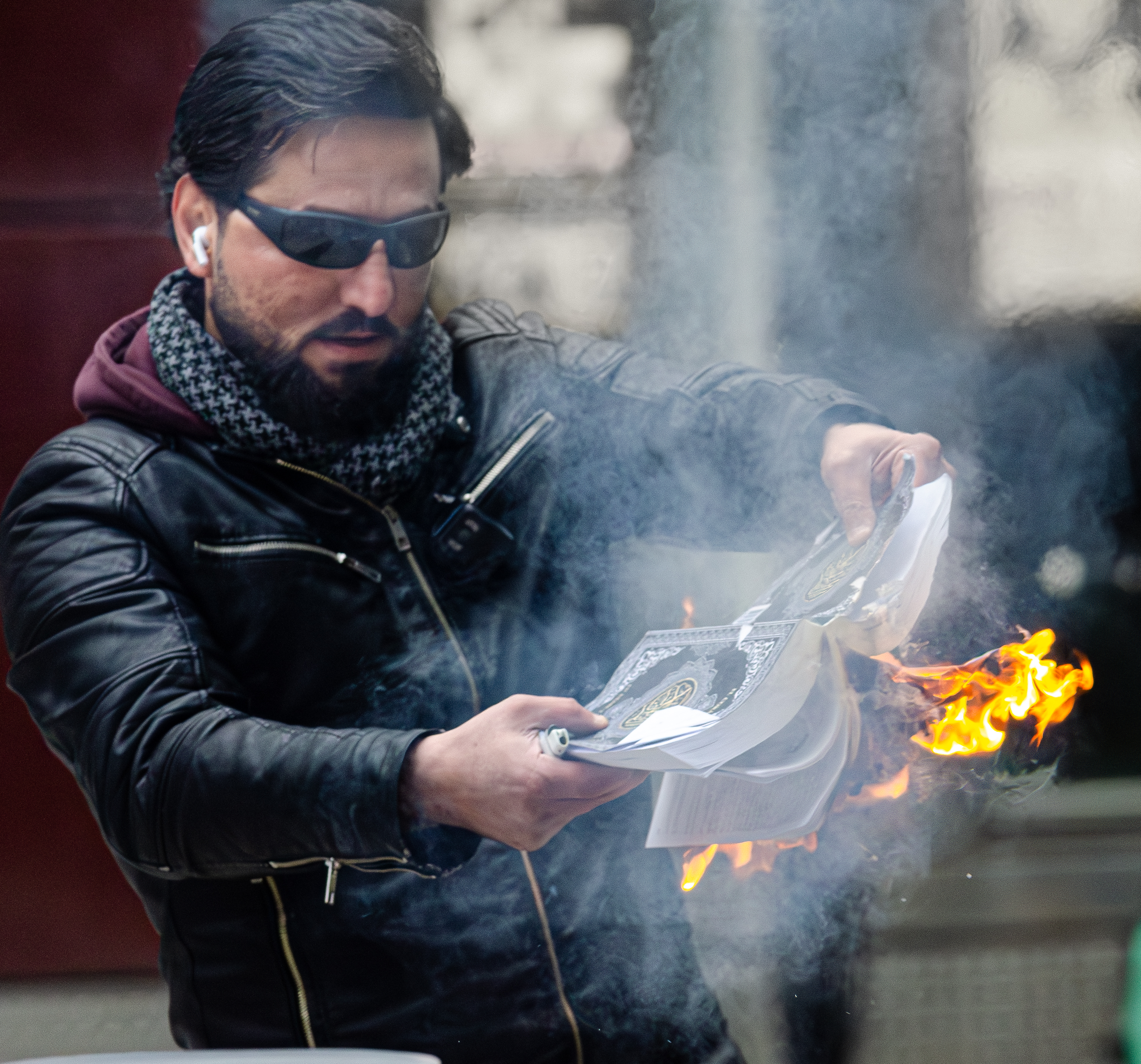
Salwan Momika burning a Quran with Spanish tafsir and translation (Note: El Corán en árabe y español con Tafsir y Traducción, ISBN 9798360654230.) in October 2023

Since 2020, the Danish party Stram Kurs and the party leader Rasmus Paludan have planned or orchestrated Quran burnings in multiple Swedish cities. This has resulted in numerous riots in Swedish cities against both planned and realized desecrations, notably the 2020 Sweden riots and 2022 Sweden riots.

On June 28, 2023, Salwan Momika, an Iraqi immigrant living in Sweden burned a copy of the Quran and played football with the copy, outside Stockholm's central mosque. The Swedish police had granted a permit for the demonstration, after a Swedish court ruling that allowed it on the grounds of freedom of expression. The incident led to international protests.

There is a law in Sweden against incitement to ethnic or racial hatred. This, however, does not apply to critique of religion, which is explicitly protected in the Swedish constitution, or desecration against a religion as such. It only applies to negative statements against people based on having a specified religion.

Whilst Momika was subject to hate-crime charges, he was assassinated the day before the verdict was due to be released, possibly in a religious killing motivated by his Quran burning activities. This caused all charges against him to be dropped.

The killing was described by professor of civil law Mårten Schultz as a significant failure for Sweden's rule of law, if the murder motive was his critique of islam. He argued that Sweden's freedom of expression would be meaningless if it is not protected. "It is particularly tragic if he was murdered due to exercising the far-reaching freedoms of expression we have in Sweden."

On July 20, 2023, hundreds of protesters stormed the Swedish embassy in Baghdad in response to a planned Quran burning in Stockholm, prompting Iraqi authorities to expel the Swedish ambassador and recall their chargé d'affaires. The incident led to diplomatic tensions between Iraq and Sweden, with condemnation from several countries, including the U.S. and the UNAOC.

On February 17, 2024, in Stockholm, a woman named Jade Sandberg, dressed as a nun, burned the Quran and called for a ban of Islam in Europe.

=== 2025 – London ===
On 13 February 2025 Hamit Coşkun was attacked by Moussa Kadri with a knife for burning the Quran outside the Turkish consulate in London. Coskun was charged with a religiously aggravated public order offence and pleaded not guilty, and Kadri was charged with causing bodily harm and possessing an offensive weapon.

=== 2025 – Texas ===
On 26 August 2025 Valentina Gomez, a Republican congressional candidate in Texas, sparked outrage after posting a video on X showing her burning a copy of the Quran, captioned "I will end Islam in Texas so help me God." The incident drew condemnation from Muslim advocacy groups, political leaders, and social media users. Gomez has previously engaged in provocative stunts targeting Muslims, immigrants, and LGBTQ+ communities.

=== Others ===
In March 2013, the al-Qaeda English-language magazine Inspire published a poster stating "Wanted dead or alive for crimes against Islam" with a prominent image of Terry Jones, known for public Quran burning events. Iran's news agency, IRIB, reported on April 8, 2013, that Terry Jones planned another Quran burning event on September 11, 2013. On April 11, IRIB published statements from an Iranian MP who said the West must stop the event and warned that "the blasphemous move will spark an uncontrollable wave of outrage among over 1.6 billion people across the globe who follow Islam." In Pakistan, protesters set the American flag and effigy of the US pastor Terry Jones on fire, condemning the 9/11 plan, according to an April 14, 2013 article in The Nation.

In October 2013, a Turkish woman was arrested on suspicion of blasphemy and inciting religious hatred after allegedly stepping on Quran and then posting the picture on Twitter.

Proposals to recycle old Qurans in Pakistan have met with opposition.

On July 31, 2016, a couple of days after the Normandy church attack, several copies of the Quran at the multi-faith room of Mater Dei Hospital in Malta were desecrated when slices of pork were laid inside the book. The perpetrators also left a photo of Jacques Hamel, the Catholic priest murdered during the attack, with the caption "Victim of Islam".

Turkey summoned the Dutch ambassador in Ankara following "a vile attack" on the Quran in the Hague in January 2023 by Dutch Pegida leader Edwin Wagensveld. Ambassador Joep Wijnands was told by the Foreign Ministry that Turkey condemned "the heinous and despicable act" and demanded the Netherlands not to allow such "provocative acts".

2025–2026 – United States

In November 2025, American activist Jake Lang attempted to burn a copy of the Quran during an anti-Islam demonstration in Dearborn, Michigan. Counter-protesters prevented the burning by taking the Quran from him. In January 2026, Lang again announced plans to burn a Quran during a demonstration in Minneapolis, although it was not clear whether he carried out the act.

== See also ==
- Bible desecration
- Criticism of the Quran
- Attempted imitations of the Quran
- Desecration
- Host desecration
- List of blasphemy cases in Pakistan
