= Stram Kurs =

Hard Line Stram Kurs (Danish)
- Leader: Rasmus Paludan
- Founded: 17 March 2017; 9 years ago
- Headquarters: Enghavevej 166 2450 Copenhagen SV
- Youth wing: Stram Kurs Ungdom
- Ideology: Ethnic nationalism; Identitarianism; Anti-immigration; Islamophobia; Hard Euroscepticism
- Political position: Far-right
- Danish affiliation: Hard Line; No to Islam in Denmark
- Colours: Blue
- Folketing: 0 / 179 (Note: Only 175 of the 179 seats in the Danish Parliament, the Folketing, are obtainable by Danish political parties as Greenland and the Faroe Islands are assigned two seats each due to their status as territories in the Kingdom of Denmark.)
- Riksdag: 0 / 349

Election symbol
- P

Website
- stramkurs.dk

Stram Kurs (transl. Hard Line), (transl. Tight Course) is a far-right, nationalist, anti-Islam political party in Denmark and Sweden founded in 2017 by Danish-Swedish lawyer Rasmus Paludan. The party is almost exclusively associated with its founder and his anti-Islam activism and demonstrations.

The party was on the ballot in the 2019 Danish general election, where it gained 1.8% of the votes, below the 2% election threshold.

== History ==
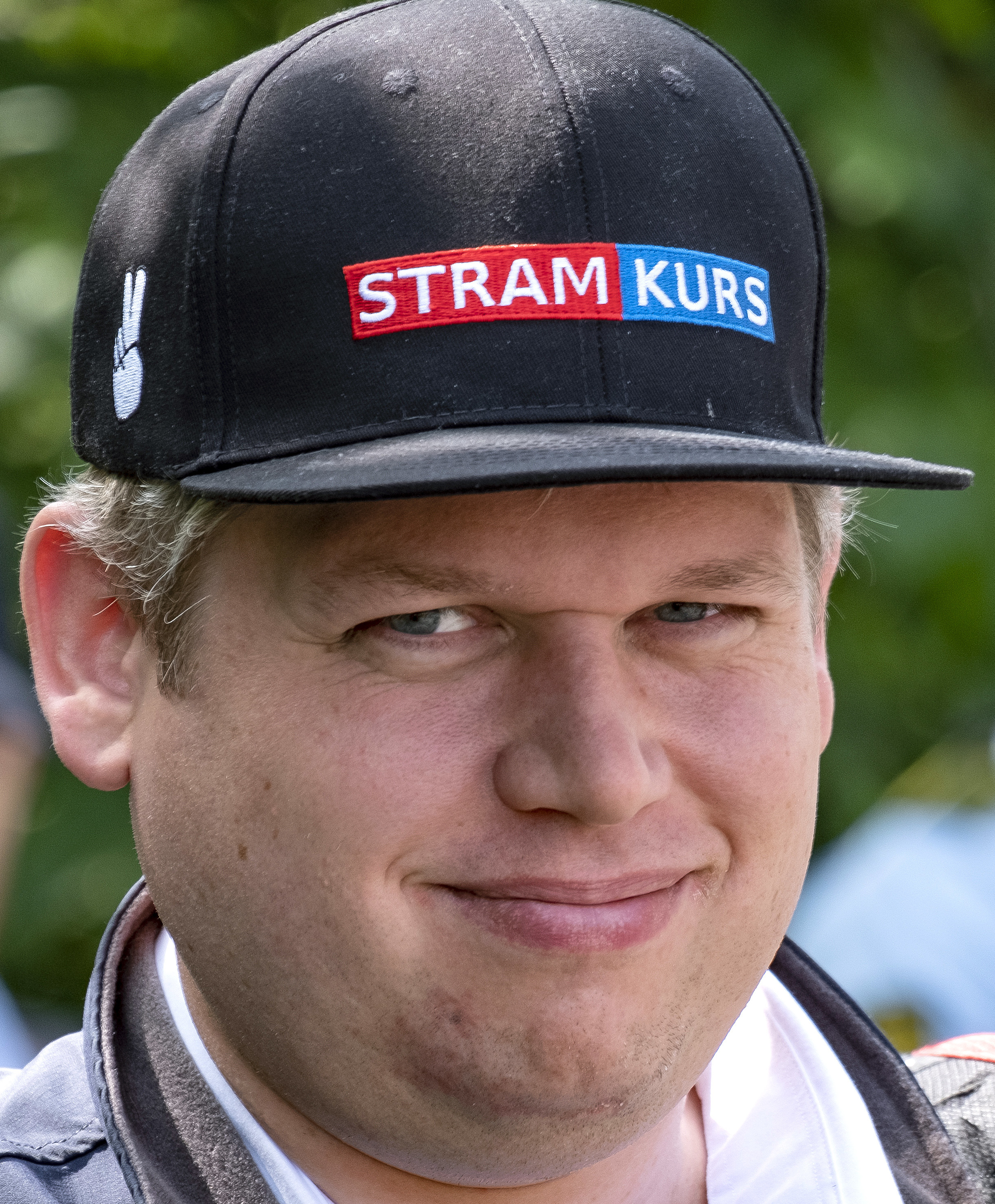
Rasmus Paludan, the chief of the party

The party was founded on 16 March 2017 by Rasmus Paludan. It ran in six municipalities in the 2017 Danish local elections, but it failed to receive more than 200 votes in any municipality, preventing the party from gaining a seat on any council. It also ran unsuccessfully in two of the five Danish regions.

Paludan became known on YouTube, where videos on the party's channel have gained 20 million views as of April 2019. The videos were often filmed during demonstrations that Hard Line held in ghettoes, during which Paludan deliberately provoked Muslims, such as by drawing Muhammad, burning the Quran and wrapping the Quran in bacon. In 2018, the party held 53 demonstrations.

The party gained mainstream attention on 14 April that year, when Paludan held a demonstration at Nørrebro in Copenhagen. At the demonstration, Paludan threw the Quran, and was attacked shortly after the demonstration began. The demonstration caused massive unrest at Nørrebro when protestors attacked the police. Over the following days, Paludan was barred from continuing his demonstrations because of the risk to public order and the threats against him.

=== 2019 Danish general election ===
On 27 April 2019, the party announced that it had gathered more than the 20,109 voter declarations required to appear on the ballot in the 2019 Danish general election. This was formally approved by the Ministry for Economic Affairs and the Interior on 6 May, when they were also given the list letter P. The declarations were not collected according to the rules, which circumvented a reflection period of seven days, but the ministry could not sanction the rule-breaking because of a loophole in the regulations.

In early May 2019, polls showed the party with 2.7% and 3.9% support, over the threshold of 2.0% required for a party to win seats in parliament. On 9 May, an older YouTube video of Paludan holding a speech about Islam and 9/11 surfaced on the internet. Danish media began reporting on the video because a statement by Paludan was interpreted as a call to violence and genocide of Muslims. "The best thing that could happen would be not to have a single Muslim left on our dear Earth" is the rough translation of the quote from the video, filmed during a visit to New Jersey. Danish lawyer Jacob Mchangama was quoted as saying that Paludan's statement was, in all likelihood, a violation of Danish law.

At the general election on 5 June 2019, Hard Line won 1.8% of the votes, and did not receive any seats in the Folketing.

In March 2020, Hard Line was banned from collecting new voter declarations until September 2022, after the independent election board found that Hard Line had misused the voting declaration system. The party had already been temporararily suspended in December 2019, following suspicions of fraudulent use. Their ballot access was scheduled to expire in October 2020. To circumvent the ruling, Hard Line instead founded a new party, legally named Hard Line (as opposed to Stram Kurs). Paludan called the new party a "sister party", and said the new party would have the same policy and candidates as Stram Kurs, and that the intent was that they should fusion into one party again in the future. The Ministry of the Interior found the creation of the new party to be legal.

=== Demonstrations ===
==== April 2019 Copenhagen demonstration ====
Party leader Rasmus Paludan burning a Quran under police protection in Nørrebro, 2019

In April 2019, the party held an event in which the Quran was tossed around and then burned. Paludan was attacked by rioters during a demonstration at the Blågårds Plads in the ethnically diverse Nørrebro district of Copenhagen. After the attack, Paludan was escorted away from the event, but the riots resumed when he returned, and police used tear gas to subdue the rioters, who numbered about 200.

In June 2019, a 17-year-old was sentenced for attacking police officers, and given eight months in prison, as well as a warning, in accordance with Danish immigration regulations. He was found to have thrown rocks, glass bottles and fireworks at police. The following month, a 26-year-old man was found guilty of having thrown rocks at police and sentenced to a year in prison. In September that year, two men aged 18 and 35 respectively, were found guilty of disturbing the peace and using violence against police. The 35-year-old received a sentence of 9 months in prison and the 18-year-old received 8 months in prison. Additionally, the family of the 18-year-old, who was 17 when he committed the crimes, was evicted by the public landlord, as they had demonstrably disturbed the peace in the area.

==== 2020 demonstrations in Sweden ====
Towards the end of August 2020, the party staged a Quran burning event in Rosengård, a suburb of Malmö, which led to the 2020 Sweden riots when rioters protested violently.

On 10 September 2020, Hard Line burned a Quran in the Stockholm suburb of Rinkeby, and posted the event on a video platform. The party had previously applied for permission to hold the event at five locations, but the Swedish Police authority denied it permission. The desecration was caught on surveillance cameras and police started to look for party members. Police later stopped two vehicles and arrested seven people, who were armed with batons and steel pipes, for preparing assault. Some of the arrested had connections to the Antifascistisk Aktion (Antifa Sweden), who were looking for the party members. In connection with the event, 15 Muslim congregations demanded that the Basic Laws of Sweden be changed to ban insult and ridicule of religions, so that the perpetrators of these events are no longer protected by laws guarding freedom of speech.

==== 2022 demonstrations in Sweden ====
Paludan's visit to Sweden in April 2022 and planned Quran burning triggered riots or unrest in Malmö, Stockholm, Örebro, Linköping, Norrköping, and Landskrona, some of which involved criminal gangs targeting police, rather than Stram Kurs. Protests also occurred at the Swedish embassy in Iran, and Iraq lodged a diplomatic protest. Paludan abandoned his planned appearance at one rally due to personal safety concerns.

== Platform ==
=== Philosophy ===
The party's philosophical foundation is "ethno-nationalist utilitarianism", described as maximizing the "greatest happiness for the greatest number of ethnic Danes". This platform is developed in two political pillars. First, an "identitarian" or ethno-nationalist pillar which focuses on protecting and increasing the "ethnic, cultural, religious, linguistic, and normative homogeneity" of Denmark. Second, a right-libertarian pillar which envisions a radical increase in individual liberty and rights, once the ethnic homogeneity of the country has been "restored" through the banning of Islam and massive deportations. According to scholars on identitarianism however, the party is more heavily influenced by the counter-jihad movement than strict identitarianism.

=== Immigration ===
The Hard Line seeks a ban on Islam, a complete stop to immigration from non-Western countries and deportation of all Muslims and most other immigrant groups. Under their proposals, only native-born ethnic Danes and those "adopted as infants" would be allowed in the country, with specific exceptions for visiting tourists, foreign diplomats and qualified foreign spouses "with a background in the Western European culture."

Ethnic and national homogeneity are to be secured through a large-scale deportation programme, described in party materials:

Denmark must deport every non-Western person who has received asylum and is not a native-born citizen of one Denmark's neighbouring countries. Denmark must deport every non-Western person who isn't a Danish citizen. For non-Westerners with temporary visas, the visa will not be renewed. Non-Westerners with permanent legal status should also have their status revoked and be deported.

Foreigners who have received Danish citizenship by the legal naturalisation process should have their citizenship reevaluated, with the assumption that it will be annulled. Foreigners who have received asylum in Denmark, should of course be deported immediately, given that the foundation for asylum is no longer valid. This applies to their offspring, as well.

Every person without legal status in Denmark shall be interned until they can be deported. Individuals who lack legal status while they wait for response to a visa application will be deported while the case is under review. If deportation isn't possible, the applicant should be interned while the application is reviewed.

== Organisation ==
It is unclear how many members Hard Line has. The party is run by Paludan and has no local or regional chapters, and party officials are appointed by him rather than elected by the members, as is customary with Danish parties. Their website hosts a single section of the party's by-laws.

In March 2020, Hard Line (legally named Stram Kurs) was barred from collecting voter declarations for 2 and a half years, due to fraudulent use of the system. Since June 2020, Stram Kurs has instead collected voter declarations under the name "Hard Line", which is legally a distinct party. Paludan has characterised the new party as a "sister party" of Stram Kurs, and said that it will have the policies and candidates of Stram Kurs. Should the new party manage to gain ballot access, they would appear on the ballot as "Hard Line".

== Election results ==
=== Denmark ===
==== Folketing ====
Folketing
Date	Votes			Seats	
Date	No.	%	± pp	No.	±
2019	63,091	1.8 (11th)	New	0 / 179	New

==== Municipal elections ====
Date	Votes	Seats	
Date	Votes	No.	±
2017	286	0 / 2,432	New

==== Regional elections ====
Date	Votes	Seats	
Date	Votes	No.	±
2017	834	0 / 205	New

=== Sweden ===
==== Riksdag ====
Riksdag
Date	Votes			Seats	
Date	No.	%	± pp	No.	±
2022	156	0.0 (30th)	New	0 / 349	New
