= Kata'ib al-Imam Ali =

Armed wing of the islamic movement

- كتائب الإمام علي
- Kata'ib al-Imam Ali logo
- Leaders: Secretary General Shibl al-Zaydi (fa) (overall leader); Abu Mahdi al-Muhandis † (unofficial patron, operations commander)
- Dates active: June 2014 – present
- Allegiance: Iraq (nominal); Iran (IRGC)
- Group: Kataib Rouh Allah Issa Ibn Miriam
- Active regions: Iraq; Syria
- Ideology: Shia Islamism; Wilayat al Faqih; Anti-Americanism; Anti-Zionism
- Part of: Popular Mobilization Forces (PMF); Harakat al-Iraq al-Islamiyah

Kata'ib al-Imam Ali (Arabic: كتائب الإمام علي, romanized: Kataʾib al-ʾImām ʿAlī, lit. 'Imam Ali Battalion'), also known as the Imam Ali Brigades, are an Iraqi Shiite paramilitary organization and the armed wing of the Islamic Movement of Iraq (Harakat al-Iraq al-Islamiyah), and serves as part of the umbrella organization, Popular Mobilization Forces (PMF). Kata'ib al-Imam Ali rose to prominence during the War in Iraq (2013–2017), when it fought against the Islamic State of Iraq and the Levant (ISIL) alongside Iraqi government forces. In 2026, Imam Ali Brigades have proposed a plan to place their weaponry under government control.

== History ==
Kata'ib al-Imam Ali came into existence in June 2014 as the armed wing of the Harakat al-Iraq al-Islamiyah (Movement of the Islamic Iraq) party. While its emergence was linked to the large-scale Shia mobilization after the escalation of Iraq's Sunni Arab insurgency into a full-out civil war, Kata'ib al-Imam Ali is closely connected to older Iraqi Shia Islamist organizations, parties and militias, as well as to the Iranian Quds Force. The group's secretary general Shibl al-Zaydi is affiliated with the Sadrist Movement, and was at one point member of the anti-American Mahdi Army. Kata'ib al-Imam Ali also appears to enjoy the favour of Abu Mahdi al-Muhandis, leader of the Popular Mobilization Forces, who has at times even personally led the group into battle. Thanks to these links, Kata'ib al-Imam Ali is well-equipped and has been able to recruit veteran militants, allowing a "meteoric growth".

Notably, Kata'ib al-Imam Ali has also attempted to rally Christian Assyrians to its cause since its formation, based on a purported affinity between Shia Islam and Christians and the supposed betrayal of the Iraqi Christians by Iraqi Kurdistan in course of the Fall of Mosul. In line with these attempts, the group formed its own, though minor, Christian unit, the Kataib Rouh Allah Issa Ibn Miriam, or "Spirit of God Jesus Son of Mary Battalions".

In late 2014, one of the group's commanders, Abu Azrael, gained prominence after appearing in the media armed with axes, swords and machine guns.

In 2015, Kata'ib al-Imam Ali began to send its fighters to Syria, allegedly to protect the Sayyidah Zaynab Shrine, and participated in the Second Battle of Tikrit. In early 2016, its fighters were involved in the Syrian government offensive to reconquer Palmyra and Tadmur from ISIL, and later that year, Kata'ib al-Imam Ali took part in the Battle of Mosul and the Aleppo offensive (November–December 2016). In 2026, Kata'ib al-Imam Ali announced a plan to put weaponry under Iraqi governmental control.

== See also ==
- Popular Mobilization Forces
- List of armed groups in the War in Iraq
- Holy Shrine Defender
- List of military units named after people
