= Hovsjö =

Neighborhood in Södertälje, Sweden

Coordinates: 59°10′41″N 17°35′54″E

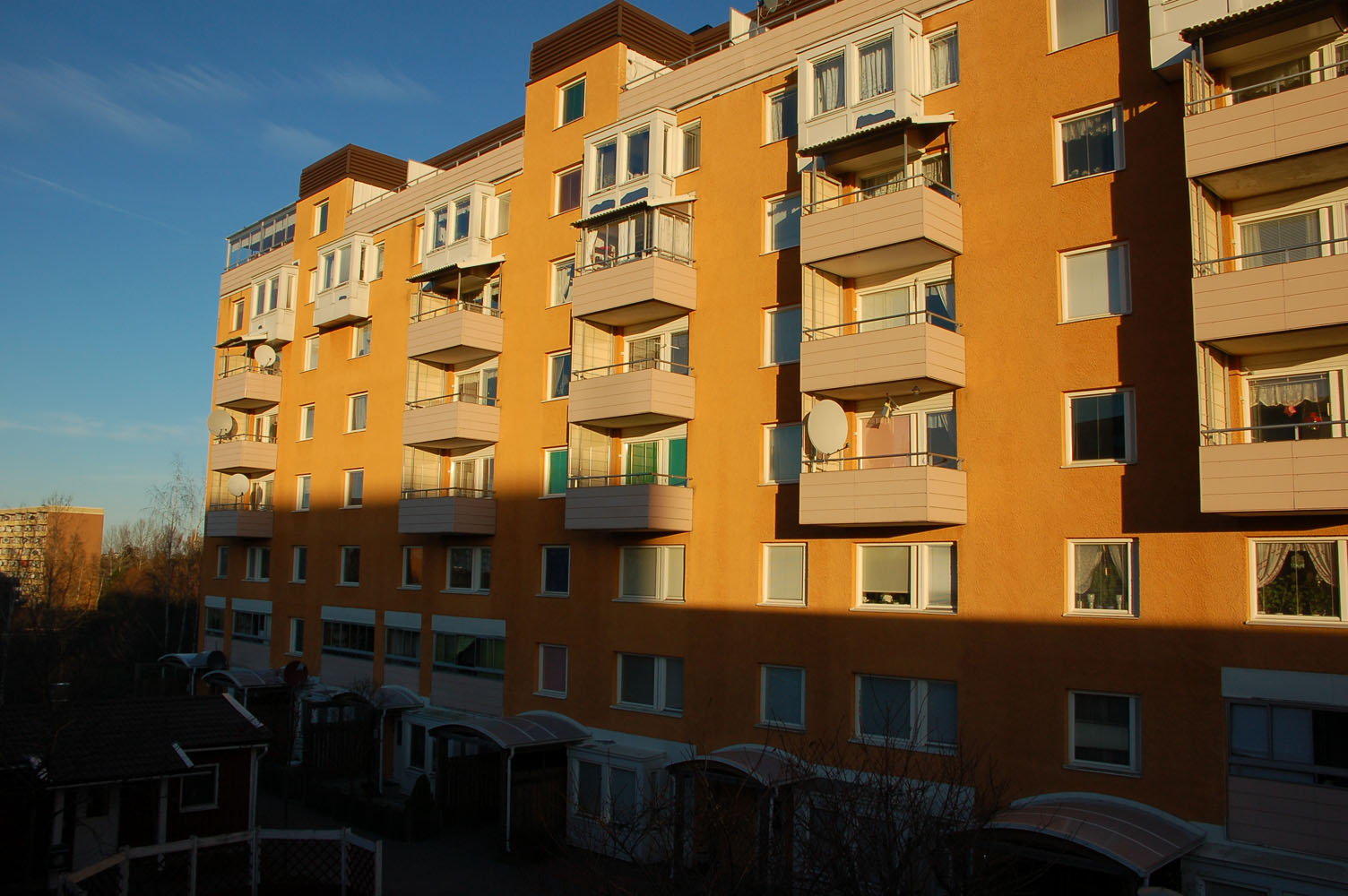
Hovsjö, as seen from Granövägen 53

Hovsjö is a neighborhood in the city of Södertälje in Stockholm County, Sweden.

== History ==
Hovsjö was built between 1971 and 1975, at the tail end of the Million Programme to house the laborers moving to Södertälje to work at Astra Zeneca and Scania AB, which were major employers in the area. In 2021 there were around 2,200 housing units with a blend of high density apartment buildings as well as lower density rowhouses.

In 2013 there were about 5,000 to 6,000 residents in Hovsjö, with a high percentage of residents of non-Swedish ethnic background. Main ethnic groups represented are Assyrian people, Finns, and Armenians.

48.8% was foreign born in 1990, up to 50.1% in 1994. 71.6% had a foreign background in 1997, rising to 85.5% in 2008, and 92.8% in 2024.
