= Wedding of Victoria, Crown Princess of Sweden, and Daniel Westling =

2010 royal wedding in Storkyrkan, Sweden

- Victoria and Daniel’s dual cypher

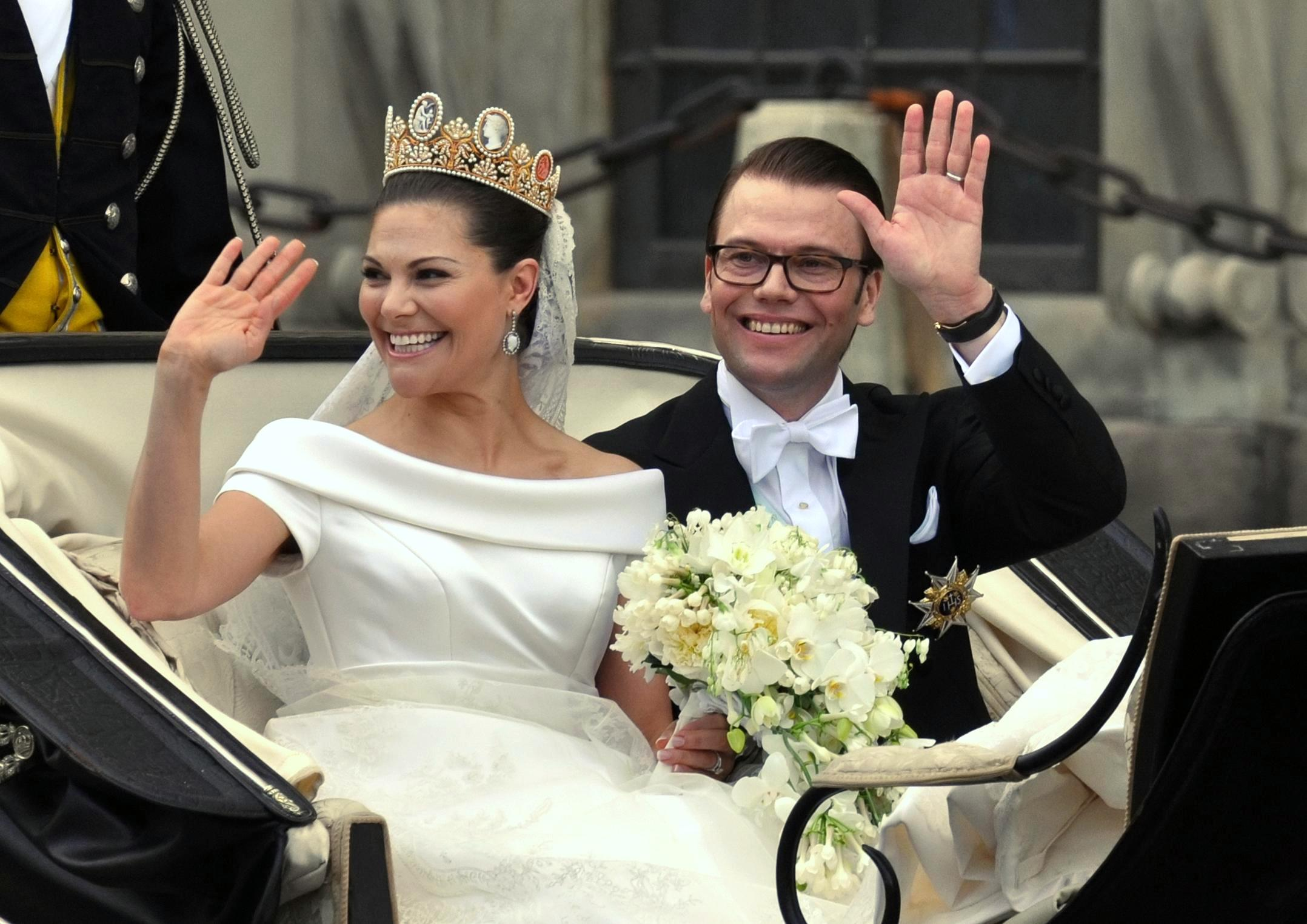
- Wedding procession of the royal couple in an open carriage through Stockholm
- Date: 19 June 2010
- Venue: Storkyrkan
- Location: Stockholm, Sweden
- Participants: Victoria, Crown Princess of Sweden; Daniel Westling

The wedding of Victoria, Crown Princess of Sweden, and Daniel Westling took place on 19 June 2010 in Stockholm Cathedral. It had been described as "Europe's biggest royal wedding since the Prince of Wales married Lady Diana Spencer in 1981". Westling thereby acquired Victoria's ducal title, becoming a Swedish prince and Duke of Västergötland. In time for the wedding, a joint monogram of their initials was created.

== Background ==
Victoria is the eldest child of King Carl XVI Gustaf and Queen Silvia. As the firstborn of the family, she was designated heir apparent in 1980 (SFS 1979:932), ahead of her younger brother. Westling was Victoria's personal trainer at Master Training. In July 2002, Victoria and Westling were pictured kissing for the first time at a birthday party for Caroline Kreuger, a close friend of Victoria's. Westling and Victoria's engagement was announced on 24 February 2009. The wedding was set to take place in Stockholm Cathedral on 19 June 2010, the 34th anniversary of her parents' marriage and a traditional wedding date of the Swedish Royal Family (several past House of Bernadotte family members had married on that date). The chosen year 2010 also marks the 200th year since Jean Baptiste Jules Bernadotte, from whom the Royal House of Sweden descends, became heir presumptive to the Swedish throne.

== Preparations and finances ==
On 17 September 2009, the cathedral parish of Stockholm announced that there would be a restoration of Stockholm Cathedral during the period January–April 2010, and costing 12.4 million Swedish kronor. The wedding itself cost about 20 million kronor which was paid half by the Swedish Royal Family and half by the Swedish government from tax money. This was criticized by some Swedish citizens but the argument was debunked by official response saying that the wedding will generate equivalent or more revenue from the event. This argument was mostly seen as an excuse to continue the monarchy system, rather than evaluating their present-day relevance.

== Celebrations ==
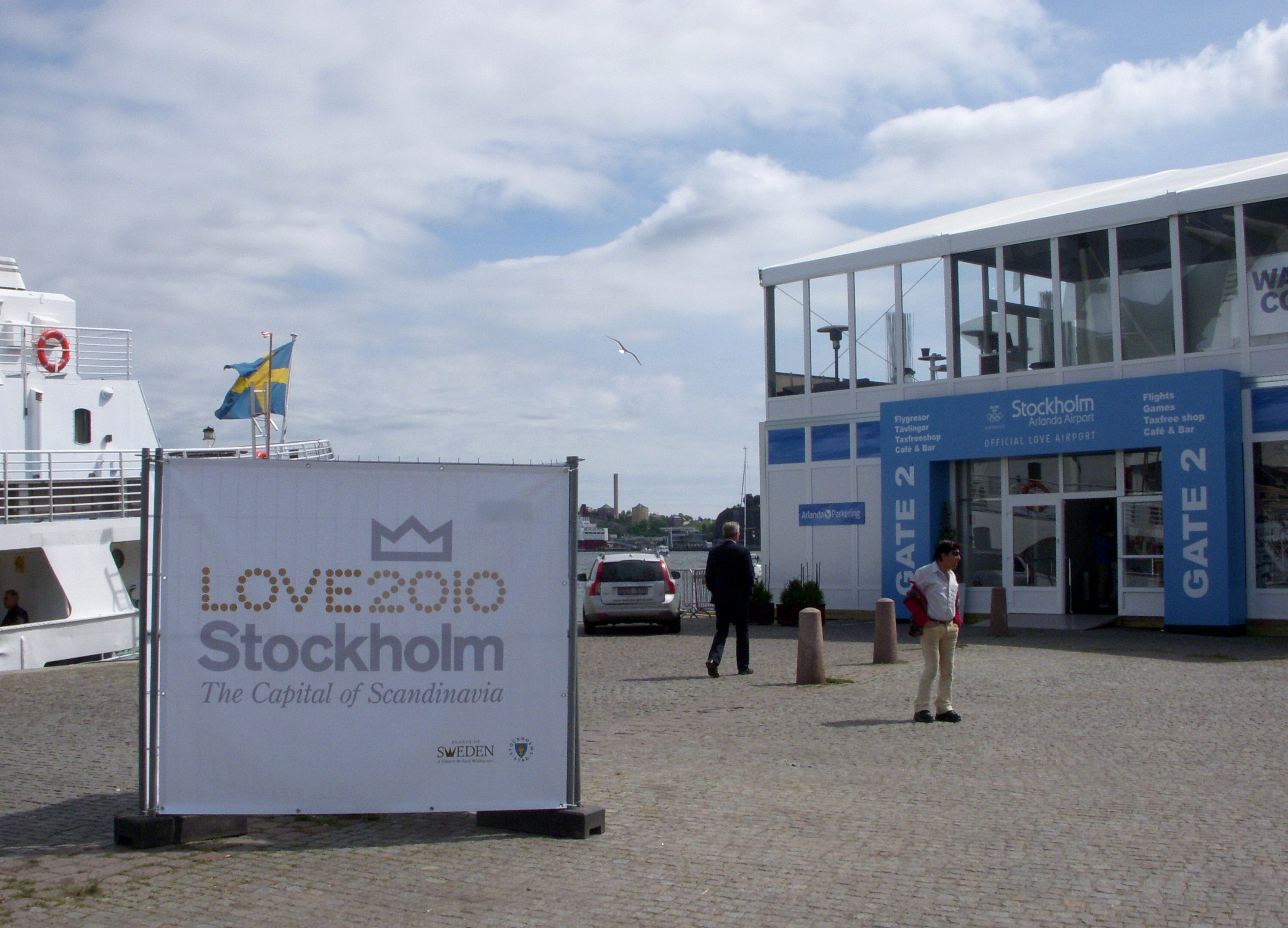
"Love Stockholm 2010" sign from Skeppsbron

On 24 November 2009 it was decided that the days between the Swedish national day on 6 June and the wedding date on 19 June would be Love Stockholm 2010 days. With festivities for residents and visitors such as music, art, culture, food, design, and history, the city of Stockholm had hoped for sponsor deals to pay for the arrangements.

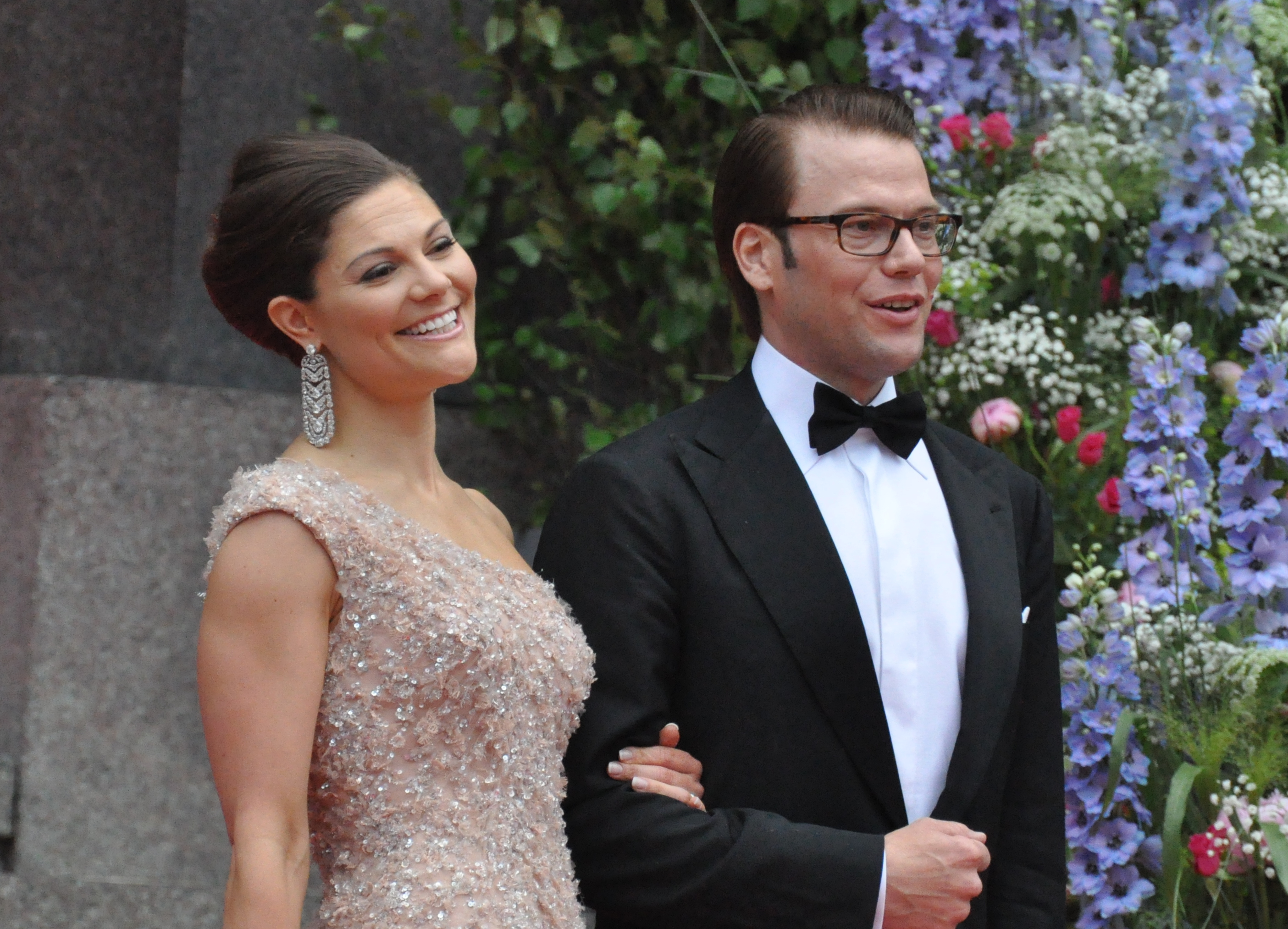
Crown Princess Victoria and Daniel Westling arriving to the Riksdag's Gala Performance at the Concert Hall on 18 June

On 18 June, the Parliament of Sweden honoured the couple with a gala performance at Stockholm Concert Hall. Performers at the gala included the Royal Stockholm Philharmonic Orchestra, Malena Ernman, Helen Sjöholm, and Peter Jöback. The famous Swedish band Roxette was reunited on stage, and they performed their hit song "The Look".

== Insignia at the wedding ==
On the morning of the wedding, the Crown of Sweden's Heir Apparent and Prince Wilhelm's Crown were removed from their showcases in the Treasury at the Royal Palace of Stockholm. They were placed on each side of the altar in the cathedral. The crowns are part of a tradition, a crown is used in association with the person the occasion is about. Princess Sofia Albertina's crown is also associated with Victoria as it was used at her christening. Princess Sofia Albertina's crown was later used at the wedding of Prince Carl Phillip.

== Wedding service ==
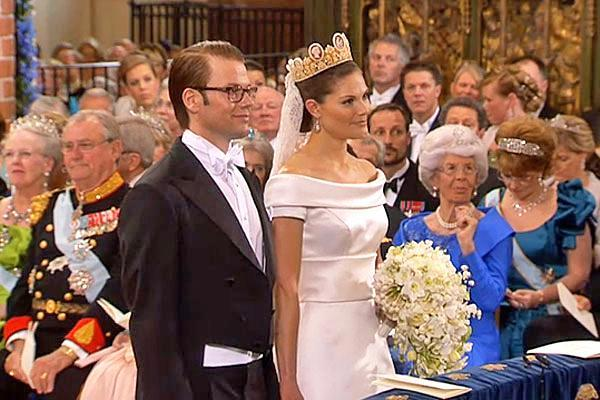
The couple at the altar

The wedding service began at 15:30 local time in Stockholm Cathedral, with around 1,100 guests present. The music in the ceremony was headed by Gustaf Sjökvist, court organist and organist for the Cathedral Parish of Stockholm. He was also in charge of the music during the wedding of Victoria's parents in 1976.

The service was conducted by Anders Wejryd, Archbishop of Uppsala. He was assisted by Lars-Göran Lönnermark, Royal Court Chief Chaplain, and Dr Antje Jackelén, Bishop of Lund. The Great Marriage Litany was sung by Åke Bonnier, Dean of the Cathedral and Royal Court Chaplain.

Victoria's white satin dress was by Swedish designer Pär Engsheden and had a five meter long train. She wore Empress Josephine's cameo diadem which her mother, Queen Silvia, and two of her paternal aunts wore when they married.

The first piece of music that was played was written by Karin Rehnqvist especially for the couple as a gift from the Royal Swedish Academy of Music.

Victoria walked down the aisle with her father, who then handed her over to Daniel. The wedding couple then stood in front of the archbishop, who told them about the importance of supporting each other in a marriage. After Victoria and Daniel were pronounced husband and wife, Swedish singers Agnes Carlsson and Björn Skifs finished the ceremony with the song "When You Tell The World You're Mine", written for the couple. Victoria and Daniel walked under crossed swords after stepping out of the cathedral.

=== Debate about handing over the bride ===
The couple wanted the king to lead the crown princess to the altar and there hand her over to the groom. This created a public debate in Sweden, as that would have been contrary to the established customs of the Church of Sweden, where bride and groom walk up to the altar together. Critics among the clergy held that the symbolism in handing over the bride from father to groom reflects reactionary societal norms, as if an unmarried woman is the property of her father and is about to turn into the proprietary ownership of the groom. The Royal Court defended the handing over with the statement that, "the king conveys the heir to the throne and hands her over to a man who has been accepted". In the end a compromise was reached, with the king handing over the crown princess to her groom before they reached the altar.

== Carriage procession ==
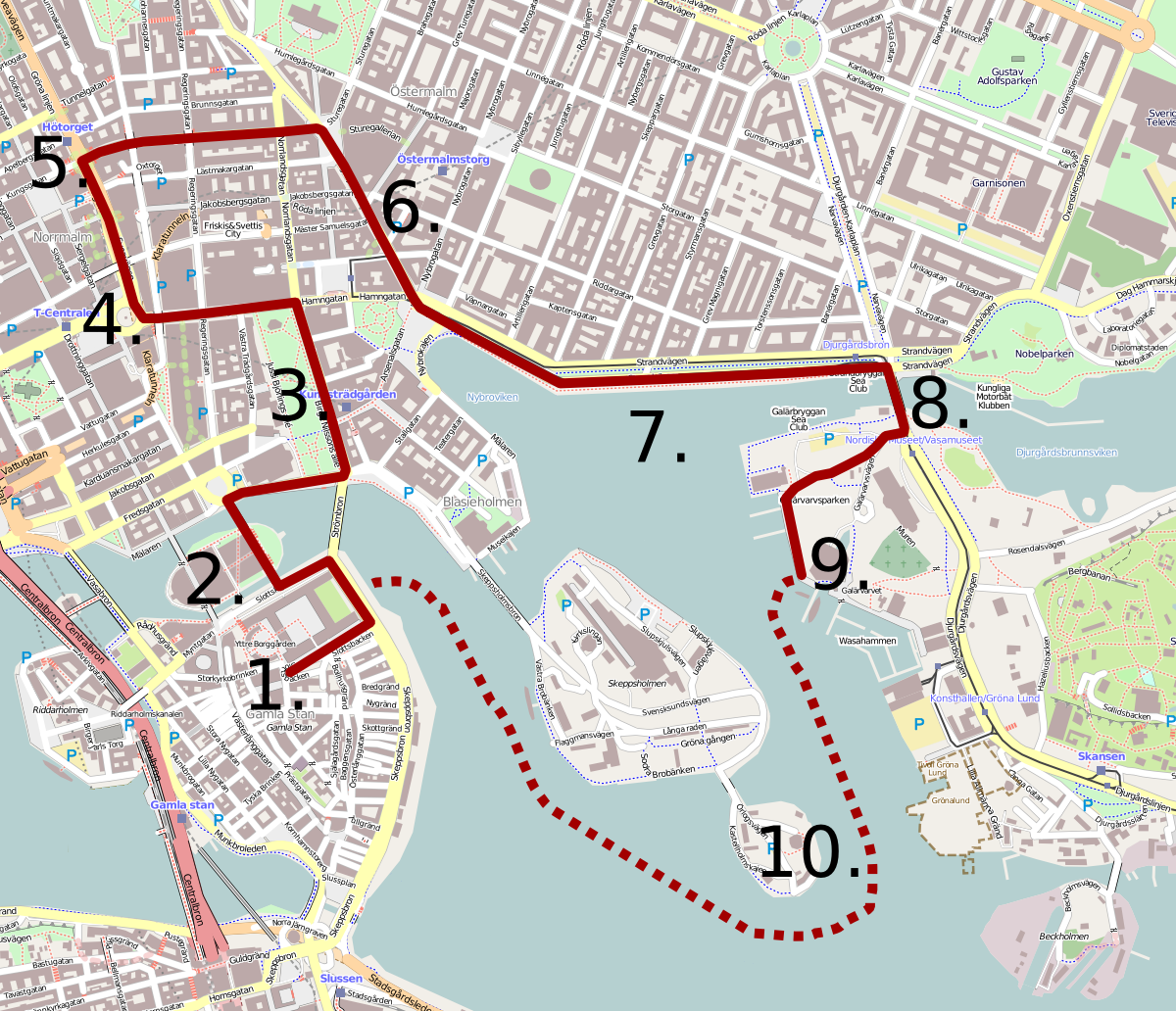
Detailed map of the wedding procession through Stockholm. 1: Storkyrkan, 2: Helgeandsholmen, 3: Kungsträdgården, 4: Sergels torg, 5: Stockholm Concert Hall, 6: Birger Jarlsgatan, 7: Strandvägen, 8: Djurgårdsbron, 9: Vasa Museum, 10: Kastellholmen.

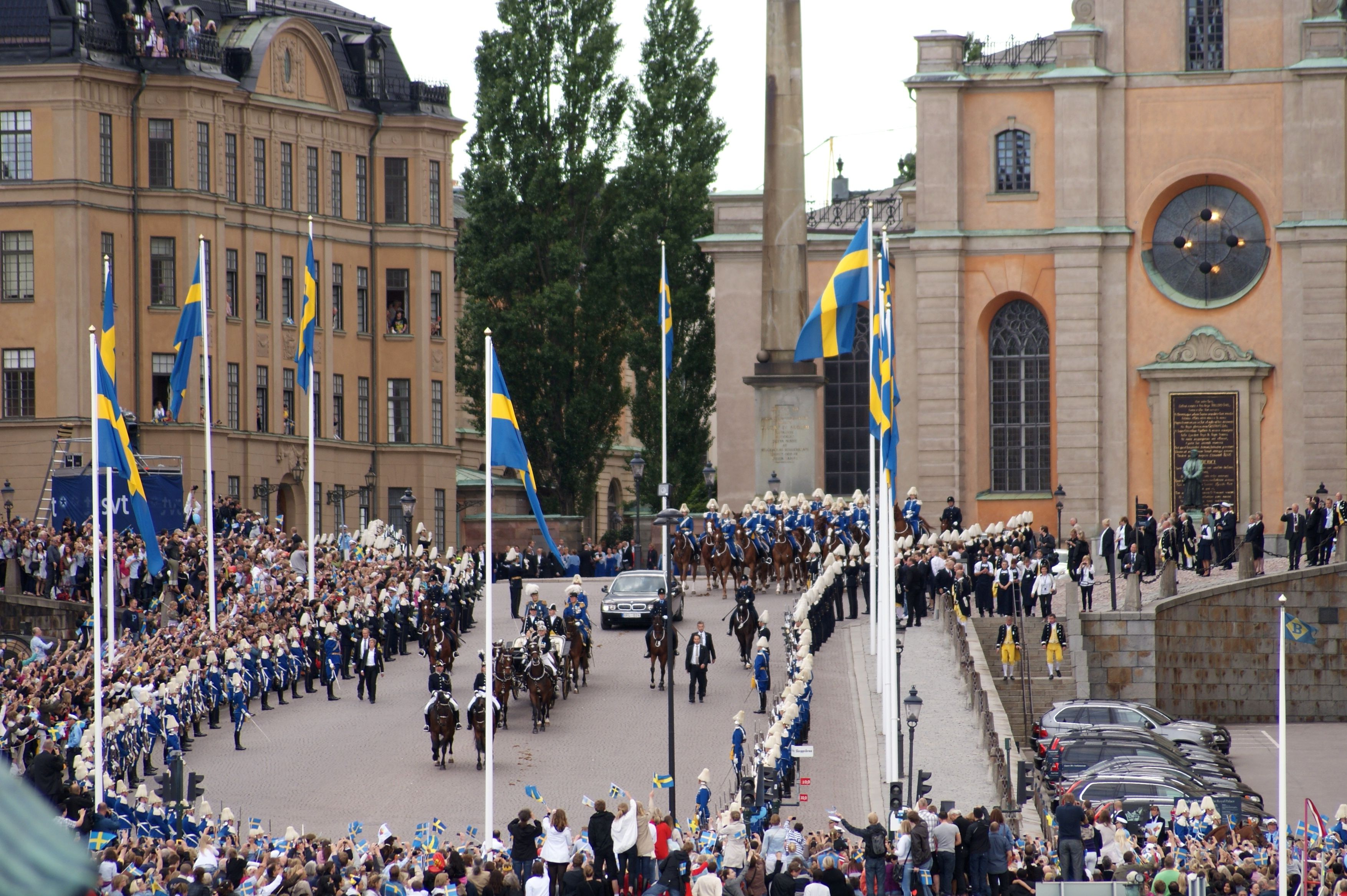
The procession carriage passing through a large crowd of people on Slottsbacken

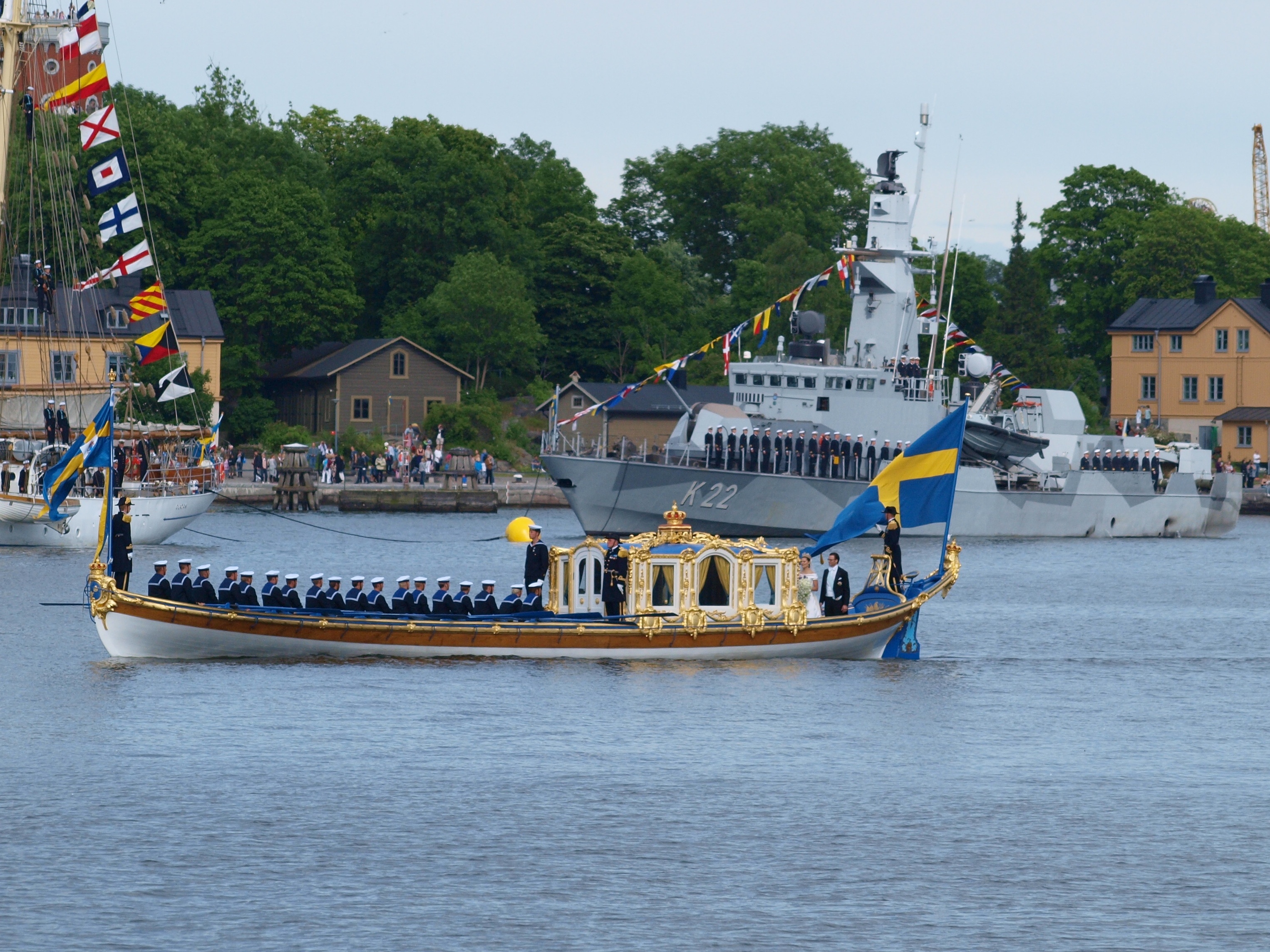
The newlywed royal couple being rowed by the barge Vasaorden through the waters of Stockholm to take the salute of the Royal Swedish Navy

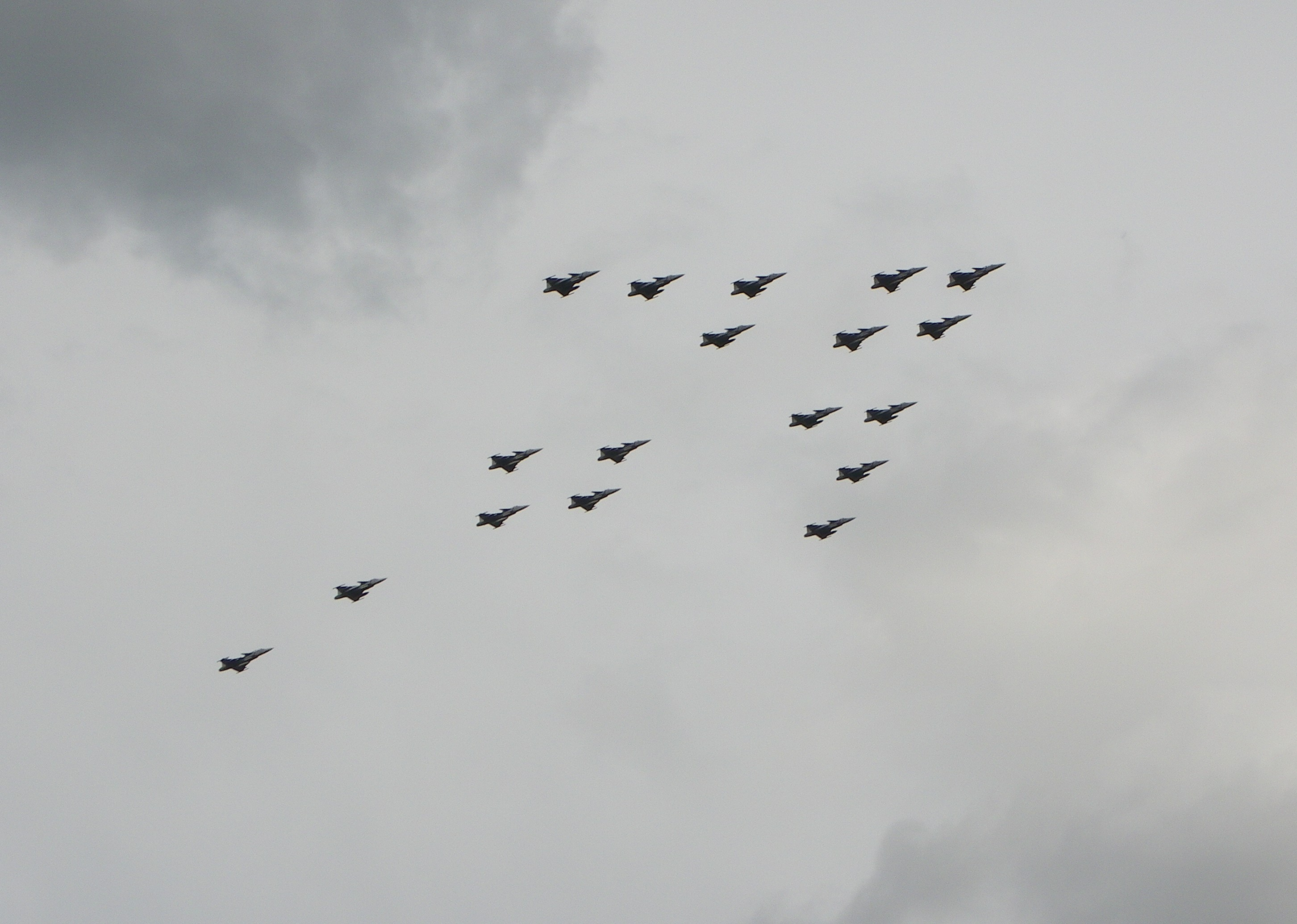
JAS 39 Gripen planes flying over Stockholm

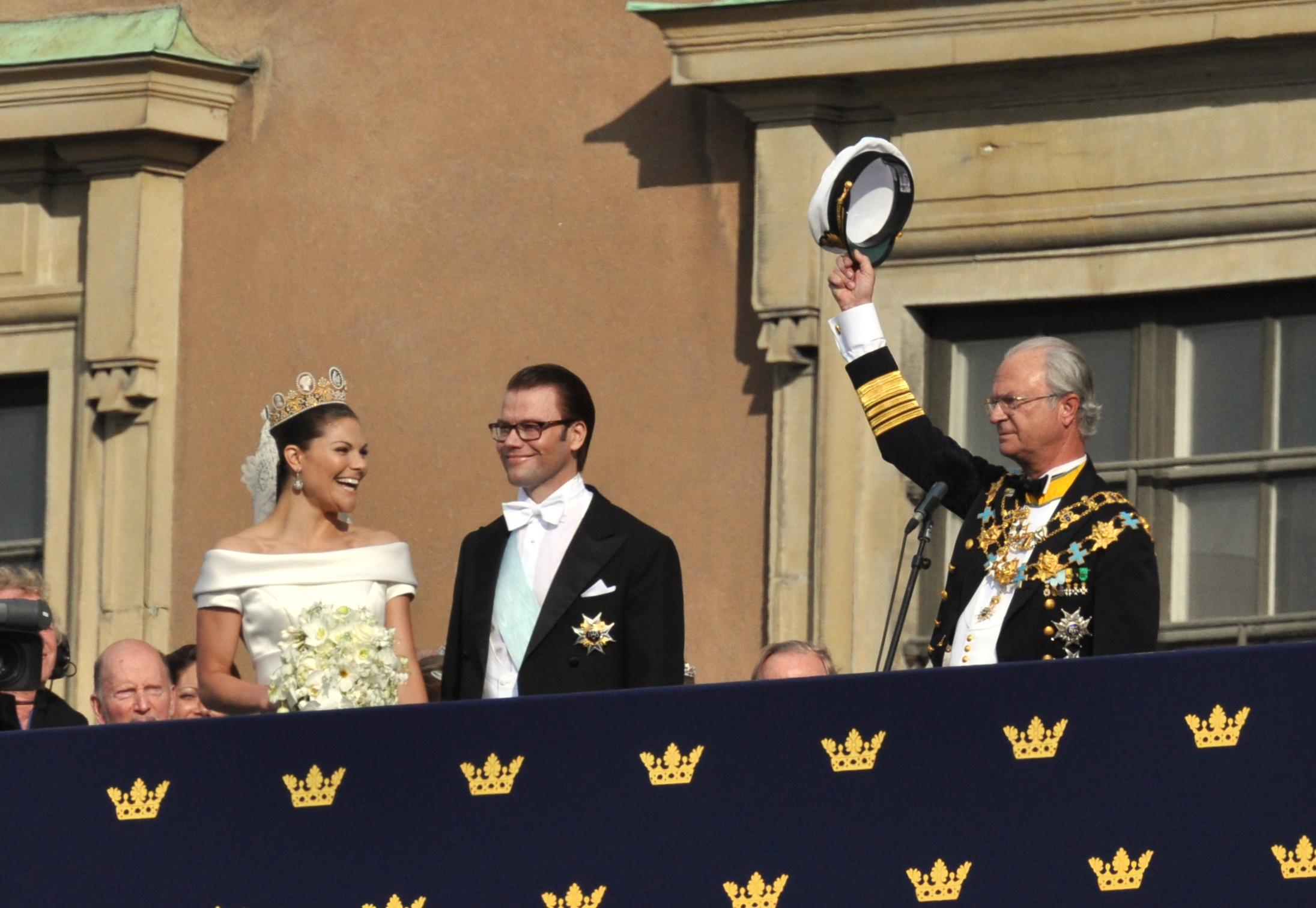
King Carl XVI Gustav leading on the hurrays for the newlywed couple from the Lejonbacken terrace of the Royal Palace

A carriage procession followed the ceremony, in which the wedding couple was transported through the streets of Stockholm. On their way they passed by twenty musical bands, nineteen of which were military. Victoria and Daniel then proceeded in the royal barge Vasaorden over Stockholm's waters; the same barge that was used by Victoria's parents, King Carl XVI Gustaf and Queen Silvia, during their wedding in 1976. 500,000 people are estimated to have gathered to watch the procession, which was nearly seven kilometers long. 18 fighter jets flew across the sky as the barge approached its landing place at the royal palace, where the wedding banquet was later held.

The wedding of Victoria and Daniel was the biggest event that has ever been covered on television in Stockholm, according to Sveriges Television.

== Guest list ==
Notable guests include:

=== The bride's paternal family ===
- The King and Queen, the bride's parents
  - Prince Carl Philip, Duke of Värmland, the bride's brother
  - Princess Madeleine, Duchess of Hälsingland and Gästrikland, the bride's sister
- Princess Margaretha, Mrs. Ambler, the bride's paternal aunt
  - Baroness Sibylla von Dincklage the bride's first cousin
    - Madeleine von Dincklage, Bridesmaid, the bride's first cousin, once removed
  - Edward and Helen Ambler, the bride's first cousin and his wife
  - James and Ursula Ambler, the bride's first cousin and his wife
- Princess Birgitta and Prince Johann Georg of Hohenzollern, the bride's paternal aunt and uncle
  - Prince Carl Christian and Princess Nicole of Hohenzollern, the bride's first cousin and his wife
  - Désirée and Eckbert von Bohlen und Halbach, the bride's first cousin and her husband
  - Prince Hubertus and Princess Ute Maria of Hohenzollern, the bride's first cousin and his wife
- Princess Désirée, Baroness Silfverschiöld and Baron Niclas Silfverschiöld, the bride's paternal aunt and uncle
  - Baron Carl and Baroness Maria Silfverschiöld, the bride's first cousin and his wife
  - Baroness Christina Louise and Baron Hans De Geer, the bride's first cousin and her husband
    - Baroness Ian De Geer, Page boy, the bride's first cousin, once removed
  - Baroness Hélène Silfverschiöld, the bride's first cousin
- Princess Christina, Mrs. Magnuson and Mr Tord Magnuson, the bride's paternal aunt and uncle
  - Gustaf Magnuson and Nathalie Ellis, the bride's first cousin and his partner
  - Oscar Magnuson and Emma Ledent, the bride's first cousin and his partner
  - Victor Magnuson and Frida Bergström, the bride's first cousin and his partner
- Countess Marianne Bernadotte of Wisborg, the bride's paternal grandaunt by marriage
  - Count Michael and Countess Christine Bernadotte of Wisborg, the bride's first cousin once removed and his wife
    - Countess Kajsa Bernadotte of Wisborg, the bride's second cousin
- Count Carl Johan and Countess Gunnila Bernadotte of Wisborg, the bride's paternal granduncle and grandaunt
- Countess Bettina Bernadotte of Wisborg and Philipp Haug, the bride's second cousin once removed and her husband
- Count Björn and Countess Sandra Bernadotte of Wisborg, the bride's second cousin once removed and his wife
- Madeleine Kogevinas, the bride's second cousin twice removed
- Count Bertil Bernadotte of Wisborg and Countess Jill Bernadotte of Wisborg, the bride's second cousin twice removed, and his wife
- Dagmar von Arbin, the bride's second cousin twice removed

=== The bride's maternal family ===
- Ralf de Toledo Sommerlath and Charlotte de Toledo Sommerlath, the bride's maternal uncle and aunt
  - Carmita Sommerlath Baudinet and Pierre Baudinet, the bride's cousin and her husband
    - Thibault Radigues de Chennevière, the bride's cousin, once removed
    - Chloé Radigues de Chennevière, the bride's cousin, once removed
  - Thomas de Toledo Sommerlath and Ms Bettina Aussems, the bride's cousin and his partner
  - Susanne de Toledo Sommerlath
    - Tim de Toledo Sommerlath, the bride's cousin, once removed
    - Philip de Toledo Sommerlath, the bride's cousin, once removed
    - Giulia de Toledo Sommerlath, Bridesmaid, the bride's cousin, once removed
- Walther Ludwig Sommerlath and Ingrid Sommerlath, the bride's maternal uncle and aunt
  - Sophie Pihut-Sommerlath, the bride's cousin
  - Patrick Sommerlath and Maline Luengo, the bride's cousin and his partner
    - Leopold Lundén Sommerlath, the bride's cousin, once removed (page boy)
  - Camilla Lundén, the bride's cousin ex-wife
  - Helena Christina Sommerlath, the bride's cousin
  - Vivien Nadine Sommerlath, Bridesmaid, the bride's cousin
- Carlos Augusto de Toledo Ferreira and Senhora Anna Luiza de Toledo Ferreira
- Senhora Maria Virginia Braga Leardi and Exmo Senhor Eduardo Longo
- Senhor Luiz Machado de Melo and Senhora Maria Fernanda Machado de Melo
- Exma Senhora Vera Quagliato
- Senhor Carlos M. Quagliato
- Senhor Pedro Ferreira

=== The groom's family ===
- Olle Westling and Ewa Westling, the groom's parents
  - Anna Westling Blom, the groom's sister and Mikael Söderström
    - Hedvig Blom, the groom's niece (bridesmaid)
    - Vera Blom, the groom's niece (bridesmaid)

=== Foreign royalty ===
==== Members of reigning royal families ====
- The King and Queen of the Belgians
  - (Belgium) The Duke and Duchess of Brabant
  - Princess Astrid and Prince Lorenz of Belgium
  - Prince Laurent and Princess Claire of Belgium
- The Queen and Prince Consort of Denmark
  - The Crown Prince and Crown Princess of Denmark
    - Prince Christian of Denmark (page boy)
- The Crown Prince of Japan (representing the Emperor of Japan)
- The King and Queen of Jordan
    - Princess Iman of Jordan
  - Prince Ali Bin Al-Hussein and Princess Rym bin Al-Hussein of Jordan
- Prince Hassan bin Talal and Princess Sarvath El Hassan
  - Prince Rashid bin Al-Hassan of Jordan
- Princess Noor bin Asem of Jordan
- The Hereditary Prince and Hereditary Princess of Liechtenstein (representing the Prince of Liechtenstein)
- The Grand Duke and Grand Duchess of Luxembourg
  - The Hereditary Grand Duke of Luxembourg
  - Prince Félix of Luxembourg
- The Prince of Monaco and Charlene Wittstock
- The Queen of the Netherlands
  - The Prince of Orange and Princess Máxima of the Netherlands
    - Princess Catharina-Amalia of the Netherlands (bridesmaid)
  - (Netherlands) Prince Friso and Princess Mabel of Orange-Nassau
  - Prince Constantijn and Princess Laurentien of the Netherlands
- The King and Queen of Norway
  - The Crown Prince and Crown Princess of Norway
    - Princess Ingrid Alexandra of Norway (bridesmaid)
  - Princess Märtha Louise of Norway and Ari Behn
- The Queen of Spain (representing the King of Spain)
  - (Spain) The Prince and Princess of Asturias
  - (Spain) The Duchess of Lugo
  - (Spain) The Duchess and Duke of Palma
- The Earl and Countess of Wessex (representing the Queen of the United Kingdom)

==== Members of non-reigning royal families ====
- Prince Manuel and Princess Anna of Bavaria
- Tsar Simeon II and Tsaritsa Margarita of Bulgaria
  - The Prince and Princess of Preslav
- King Constantine II and Queen Anne-Marie of the Hellenes
  - Princess Alexia of Greece and Denmark and Mr Carlos Morales Quintana
  - Prince Nikolaos of Greece and Denmark and Miss Tatiana Blatnik
  - Prince Philippos of Greece and Denmark
- Crown Princess Margareta and Prince Radu of Romania
- The Hereditary Prince and Hereditary Princess of Saxe-Coburg and Gotha
- The Prince and Princess of Sayn-Wittgenstein-Berleburg
  - The Hereditary Prince of Sayn-Wittgenstein-Berleburg and Miss Carina Axelsson
  - Princess Alexandra of Sayn-Wittgenstein-Berleburg and Count Jefferson von Pfeil und Klein-Ellguth
  - Princess Nathalie of Sayn-Wittgenstein-Berleburg and Mr Alexander Johannsmann
- Crown Prince Alexander and Crown Princess Katherine of Yugoslavia

=== Religious figures ===
- Bishop Anders Arborelius, Bishop of the Roman Catholic Diocese in Sweden
- Chief Rabbi emeritus Morton H. Narrowe
- Imam Abd al Haqq Kielan, Islamic Association
- Mission Director Karin Wiborn, Chairwoman of the Christian Council of Sweden

=== Politicians and diplomats ===
- Stefan Mikaelsson (President of the Sami Parliament)

Swedish Parliament

- Per Westerberg (Speaker) and Ylwa Westerberg
- Jan Björkman (First Deputy Speaker; Soc Dem) and Rector Karmen Björkman
- Birgitta Sellén (Second Deputy Speaker; Centre), and Agriculturalist Sven-Olov Sellén
- Liselott Hagberg (Third Deputy Speaker; Lib) and Police Inspector Göran Hagberg
- Anders Forsberg (Secretary-General of the Riksdag)
- Secretariat of the Chamber, and Birgitta Forsberg
- Lars Starell (Head of Section of the Riksdag's International Office) and Christina Starell

Party leaders

- Mona Sahlin (Soc Dem Party Chairwoman) and Bo Sahlin
- Peter Eriksson (Green Spokesperson)
- Maria Wetterstrand (Green Spokesperson) and MP Ville Niinistö

Group leaders

- MP Sven-Erik Österberg (Soc Dem) Group Leader, and Teacher Ann-Marie Österberg
- MP Lars Lindblad (Mod) Group Leader, and Sales Director Maria Lindblad
- MP Roger Tiefensee (Centre) Group Leader, and Economist Catharina Tiefensee
- MP Johan Pehrson (Lib) Group Leader, and Chief Legal Officer Pernilla Wikström Pehrson
- MP Stefan Attefall (Christ Dem) Group Leader and Chairman of the Finance Committee, and Public Relations Officer Cecilia Attefall
- MP Alice Åström (Left) Group Leader, and Journalist Lars Johansson
- MP Mikaela Valtersson (Green) Group Leader, and Group Leader Lars Valtersson
- MP Ulf Holm (Green) Group Leader

Committee chairmen and chairwomen

- MP Hillevi Engström, (Mod), Chairwoman of the Labour Market Committee, and Mr Patrik Kronegård
- MP Carina Moberg, (Soc Dem) Chairwoman of the Civil Affairs Committee, and Director Johnny Ahlqvist
- MP Anders Karlsson, (Soc Dem) Chairman of the Defence Committee, and Mrs Inga-Lill Karlsson
- MP Thomas Bodström, (Soc Dem) Chairman of the Justice Committee, and Teacher Helén Bodström
- MP Berit Andnor, (Soc Dem) Chairwoman of the Committee on the Constitution, and Director General Bo Bylund
- MP Carl B. Hamilton, (Lib) Chairman of the Committee on Industry and Trade, and Deputy CEO Ulrika Stuart Hamilton
- MP Lennart Hedquist, (Mod) Chairman of the Taxation Committee, and Controller Elisabeth Hedquist
- MP Gunnar Axén, (Mod) Chairman of the Social Insurance Committee, and Anna Nyholm, LL.M.
- MP Kenneth Johansson, (Centre) Chairman of the Social Affairs Committee, and Mrs Viola Johansson
- MP Lena Hallengren, (Soc Dem) Chairwoman of the Transport and Communications Committee, and Political Secretary Jonas Hellberg
- MP Sofia Larsen, (Centre) Chairwoman of the Education Committee, and Mr Lars Larsen
- MP Göran Lennmarker, (Mod) Chairman of the Foreign Affairs Committee, and Mrs Gunilla Lennmarker
- MP Berit Högman, (Soc Dem) Deputy Chairwoman of the Labour Market Committee, and Mr Östen Högman
- MP Inger René, (Mod) Deputy Chairwoman of the Civil Affairs Committee
- MP Thomas Östros, (Soc Dem) Deputy Chairman of the Finance Committee, and Nurse Susanne Östros
- MP Rolf Gunnarsson, (Mod) Deputy Chairman of the Finance Committee, and MP Agnetha Gunnarsson
- MP Inger Davidson, (Christ Dem) Deputy Chairwoman of the Justice Committee, and Music Director Hans Davidson
- MP Per Bill, (Mod) Deputy Chairman of the Committee on the Constitution, and Mrs Louise Bill
- MP Christer Nylander, (Lib) Deputy Chairman of the Cultural Affairs Committee, and Mrs Camilla Nylander
- MP Claes Västerteg, (Centre) Deputy Chairman of the Environment Committee, and Entrepreneur Malin Västerteg
- MP Tomas Eneroth, (Soc Dem) Deputy Chairman of the Committee on Industry and Trade, and Probation Officer Sofia Eneroth
- MP Lars Johansson, (Soc Dem) Deputy Chairman of the Taxation Committee, and Development Director Ingela Tuvegran
- MP Veronica Palm, (Soc Dem) Deputy Chairwoman of the Social Insurance Committee, and City Commissioner Roger Mogert
- MP Ylva Johansson, (Soc Dem) Deputy Chairwoman of the Social Affairs Committee, and Director, former minister Erik Åsbrink
- MP Jan-Evert Rådhström, (Mod) Deputy Chairman of the Transport and Communications Committee, and Store Manager Åsa Rådhström
- MP Marie Granlund, (Soc Dem) Deputy Chairwoman of the Education Committee
- MP Anna Kinberg Batra, (Mod) Chairwoman of the Advisory Committee on EU Affairs, and Civil Economist David Batra

The government

- Fredrik Reinfeldt, (Prime Minister; Mod), and Filippa Reinfeldt (County Council Commissioner for Healthcare)
- Maud Olofsson, (Centre; Deputy Prime Minister) and Rolf Olofsson
- Carl Bildt and Mrs Anna Maria Corazza Bildt
- Beatrice Ask (Mod; Minister for Justice)
- Mats Odell, (Christ Dem; Minister for Financial Markets) and Elisabeth Odell
- Cristina Husmark Pehrsson (Mod; Minister for Social Security) and Folke Pehrsson
- Maria Larsson, (Christ Dem; Minister for Elderly Care and Public Health, Ministry of Health and Social Affairs) and Mr Gunnar Larsson
- Eskil Erlandsson (Centre; Minister for Agriculture) and Bodil Nilsson
- Andreas Carlgren (Centre; Minister for the Environment) and Tomas Harila Carlgren
- Åsa Torstensson (Centre; Minister for Communications) and Mr Hugo Andersson
- Göran Hägglund (Christ Dem; Minister for Social Affairs) and Karin Hägglund
- Jan Björklund (Lib; Minister for Education) and Anette Brifalk Björklund (Public Relations Manager)
- Gunilla Carlsson, (Mod; Minister for International Development Cooperation) and David Weckner
- Sven Otto Littorin (Mod; Minister for Employment) and Press Secretary Évin Khaffaf
- Anders Borg, (Mod; Minister for Finance) and Susanna Borg
- Nyamko Sabuni, (Lib; Minister for Integration and Gender Equality) and Mr Carl A. Bergquist
- Tobias Billström, (Mod; Minister for Migration) and Sofia Billström
- Lena Adelsohn Liljeroth, (Mod; Minister for Culture) and Former County Governor Ulf Adelsohn
- Sten Tolgfors, (Mod; Minister for Defence) and Karin Larsson
- Ewa Björling, (Mod; Minister for Trade) and Nicke Björling
- Tobias Krantz (Lib; Minister for Higher Education and Research) and Mrs Anna Grönlund Krantz

State secretaries

- State Secretary H. G. Wessberg, Prime Minister's Office, and Marianne Reimers-Wessberg
- State Secretary Gustaf Lind, Prime Minister's Office, and Charlotta Lind
- State Secretary Magnus G. Graner, Ministry for Justice, and Mrs Susanne Graner
- State Secretary Hans Lindblad, Ministry of Finance, and District Medical Officer Agnetha Lindblad

Former speakers

- Thage G. Peterson (former Speaker) and Marion Peterson
- Birgitta Dahl (former Speaker) and Enn Kokk
- Björn von Sydow (former Speaker) and Madeleine von Sydow

Former prime pinister

- Göran Persson (former Prime Minister) and Anitra Steen

Public authorities

- Archbishop Anders Wejryd and Kajsa Wejryd (Chief Education Officer)
- Justice of the Supreme Administrative Court Sten Heckscher, President of the Supreme Administrative Court, and Maria Melin
- Fredrik Wersäll (President of the Svea Court of Appeal) and Anna Wersäll
- Sverker Göranson (Supreme Commander of the Swedish Armed Forces General) and Ann Göranson
- Anders Flodström (Chancellor of the Swedish Universities Professor) and Barbro Flodström
- Justice of the Supreme Court Marianne Gernandt Lundius, President of the Supreme Court, and Johan Gernandt
- Bo Bladholm (Chairman of the Stockholm City Council) and Mrs Rose-Marie Bladholm
- Sten Nordin (Mod; Finance Commissioner of the City of Stockholm) and Hanna Hesser Nordin
- Eva Brunne (Bishop of Stockholm) and Gunilla Lindén (Assistant Vicar)
- Antje Jackelén (Bishop of Lund) and Vicar Heinz Jackelén
- Åke Bonnier (Dean of the Cathedral Parish of Stockholm) and Kristina Gustafsson Bonnier
- National Police Commissioner Bengt Svenson, National Police Board, and Mrs Elisabeth Hallqvist
- Anders Danielsson (Head of the Swedish Security Service) and Mrs Malin Gillberg
- Carin Götblad (Chief Commissioner of the Stockholm County Police) and Professor Erling Bjurström
- Anders Hallberg (Rector Magnificus Professor at Uppsala University) and Gunilla Hallberg
- Anders Lindström (Commandant-General Lieutenant General) and Katharina Söderling-Lindström
- Thomas Norell (Director General) and Mrs Lena Forssén
- Herman af Trolle (Chief of Protocol Ambassador) and Ambassador Ingrid Hjelt af Trolle

County governors

- Per Unckel (Governor of Stockholm County) and Mistress of Ceremonies Titti Unckel
- Lars Bäckström (Governor of Västra Götaland County) and Ann-Christin Bäckström
- Barbro Holmberg (Governor of Gävleborg County)
- Peter Egardt (Governor of Uppsala County from 12 April 2010) and Lena Egardt
- Bo Könberg (Governor of Södermanland County) and Mrs Anita Könberg
- Elisabeth Nilsson (Governor of Östergötland County from 7 June 2010) and Mr Arne Andersson
- Lars Engqvist (Governor of Jönköping County) and Mrs Gullbritt Engqvist
- Kristina Alsér (Governor of Kronoberg County) and Jan Alsér
- County Governor Sven Lindgren (Chairman of the Civil Defence League) and Anna Lindgren
- Cecilia Schelin Seidegård (Governor of Gotland County)
- Gunvor Engström (Governor of Blekinge County) and Jan Engström
- Göran Tunhammar (Governor of Skåne County) and Johanna Tunhammar, LL.M.
- Lars-Erik Lövdén (Governor of Halland County) and Christina Lövdén
- Eva Eriksson (Governor of Värmland County) and Leif Tengroth
- Rose-Marie Frebran (Governor of Örebro County) and Hans Gunnar Frebran
- Ingemar Skogö (Governor of Västmanland County) and Ingrid Skogö, B.A.
- Maria Norrfalk (Governor of Dalarna County) and Björn Lothigius, M.For.
- Bo Källstrand, (Governor of Västernorrland County) and Eva Källstrand
- Britt Bohlin (Governor of Jämtland County)
- Chris Heister (Governor of Västerbotten County)
- Per-Ola Eriksson (Governor of Norrbotten County) and Mrs Lena Eriksson

Republican heads of state

- The President of Finland and Pentti Arajärvi
- The President of Iceland and Dorrit Moussaieff

Ambassadors to Sweden

- (Albania) Ruhi Hado (Albanian Ambassador) and Mrs Blegina Hado
- (Algeria) Fatha Mahraz (Algerian Ambassador) and Mrs Wahiba Mahraz
- (United States) Matthew W. Barzun (American Ambassador) and Mrs Brooke Barzun
- (Angola) Domingos Culolo (Angolan Ambassador) and Mrs Deolinda Pedro Culolo
- (Argentina) Hernán Massini Ezcurra (Argentinian Ambassador) and Mrs Silvia Fosabril
- (Australia) Paul Stephens (Australian Ambassador) and Mrs Christina Stephens
- (Austria) Dr Ulrike Tilly (Austrian Ambassador) and Dr Antonio Núñez y García-Saúco
- (Bangladesh) Imtiaz Ahmed (Bangladeshi Ambassador) and Mrs Daisy Ahmed
- (Belarus) Andrei Grinkevich (Belarusian Ambassador) and Mrs Julia Grinkevich
- (Belgium) Marc Baptist (Belgian Ambassador) and Mrs Myriam Baptist-Devuyst
- (Bolivia) Milton René Soto Santiesteban (Bolivian Ambassador) and Mrs Lilian Trujillo Bustillo
- Darko Zelenika (Bosnia and Herzegovina Ambassador)
- Bernadette Sebage Rathedi (Botswana Ambassador)
- (Brazil) Antonino Mena Gonçalves (Brazilian Ambassador) and Mrs Elisabeth Mena Gonçalves
- (United Kingdom) Andrew J. Mitchell (British Ambassador) and Mrs Helen Mitchell
- (Bulgaria) Ivan Tzvetkov (Bulgarian Ambassador) and Mrs Ira Yaneva
- (Canada) Alexandra Volkoff (Canadian Ambassador)
- (Chile) José Miguel Cruz (Chilean Ambassador) and Mrs María Angélica Toledo Arcos
- (Colombia) Rafael Nieto Navia (Colombian Ambassador) and Mrs Maria Teresa Loaiza de Nieto
- André Hombessa (Republic of the Congo Ambassador) and Mrs Augustine Hombessa
- (Croatia) Vladimir Matek (Croatian Ambassador) and Mrs Cecile Elise Matek
- (Cyprus) Pavlos Anastasiades (Cypriot Ambassador) and Mrs Maria Anastasiades
- (Denmark) Tom Risdahl Jensen (Danish Ambassador) and Mrs Helle Bundgaard
- (Ecuador) Roberto Betancourt Ruales (Ecuadorian Ambassador) and Mrs Paula Teixeira Guerra de Betancourt
- (Egypt) Osama Elmagdoub (Egyptian Ambassador) and Mrs Naglaa Mohamed Essameldin Elzawahry
- (El Salvador) Martin Rivera Gómez (Salvadoran Ambassador) and Mrs Patricia Guirola de Rivera
- (Estonia) Alar Streimann (Estonian Ambassador) and Mrs Marika Streimann
- (Ethiopia) Dina Mufti Sid (Ethiopian Ambassador) and Mrs Lina Kassa Feleke
- (Finland) Markus Lyra (Finnish Ambassador) and Mrs Iris Lyra
- (France) Joël De Zorzi (French Ambassador) and Mrs Soraya De Zorzi
- (Georgia (country)) Amiran Kavadze (Georgian Ambassador) and Mrs Ia Kavadze
- (Germany) Joachim Rücker (German Ambassador) and Dr Ines Kirschner
- (Guatemala) Fernando Molina Girón (Guatemalan Ambassador) and Mrs Victoria Eugenia Flores de Molina
- (Hungary) Gabór Szentiványi (Hungarian Ambassador)
- (Iceland) Gudmundur Á. Stefánsson (Icelandic Ambassador) and Mrs Jóna D. Karlsdóttir
- (India) Balkrishna Shetty (Indian Ambassador) and Mrs Vasundara Shetty
- (Iran) Rasoul Eslami (Iranian Ambassador) and Mrs Fatemeh Eslami
- (Republic of Ireland) Donal Hamill (Irish Ambassador) and Mrs Bernadette Hamill
- (Israel) Benny Dagan (Israeli Ambassador) and Mrs Irit Dagan
- (Italy) Angelo Persiani (Italian Ambassador) and Mrs Lisette Ingo
- (Japan) Akira Nakajima (Japanese Ambassador) and Mrs Keiko Nakajima
- (Kenya) Purity Muhindi (Kenyan Ambassador) and Dr Keguro Joe Muhindi
- (Kuwait) Ali Al-Nikhailian (Kuwaiti Ambassador) and Mrs Hana'a Yaqoub Yousef Buqammaz
- (Latvia) Maija Manika (Latvian Ambassador)
- (Laos) Done Somvorachit (Laotian Ambassador) and Mrs Douangchay Somvorachit
- (Lebanon) Nasrat El-Assaad (Lebanese Ambassador) and Dr Ruzica Gasovic
- (Lithuania) Remigijus Motuzas (Lithuanian Ambassador) and Mrs Laimutė Motuzienė
- (North Macedonia) Agon Demjaha (Macedonian Ambassador) and Mrs Teuta Demjaha
- (Malaysia) Kamarudin Mustafa (Malaysian Ambassador) and Datin Nik Rahua Nik Ab Rahman
- (Mexico) Norma Pensado Moreno (Mexican Ambassador) and Mr Patricio Montecinos
- (Mongolia) Enkhmandakh Baldan (Mongolian Ambassador) and Mrs Oyunbileg Davaasuren
- (Morocco) Zohour Alaoui (Moroccan Ambassador) and Mr Karim Kamal Bernoussi
- (Mozambique) Pedro Comissário Afonso (Mozambican Ambassador) and Mrs Mariana Dava
- (Namibia) Theresia Samaria (Namibian Ambassador) and Mr Johannes Samaria
- (Netherlands) Jan Edward Craanen (Dutch Ambassador) and Mrs Annick Georgelin
- (Nigeria) Godknows Boladei Igali (Nigerian Ambassador) and Mrs Tokoni Igali
- (North Korea) Ri Hui Chol (North Korean Ambassador) and Mrs Kim Jae Un
- (Norway) Anne K Lund (Norwegian Ambassador) and Mr Erling Magnusson
- (Pakistan) Nadeem Riyaz (Pakistani Ambassador) and the Ambassador Ayesha Riyaz
- (Panama) Ricardo Quintero (Panamanian Ambassador) and Mrs Alejandra Alemán
- (Peru) Gilbert Chauny de Porturas (Peruvian Ambassador) and Mrs Carmen de Chauny
- (Philippines) Maria Zeneida Collinson (Philippine Ambassador) and Mr Michael Collinson
- (Poland) Michal Czy (Polish Ambassador) and Mrs Elbieta Czy
- (Romania) Raduta Dana Matache (Romanian Ambassador) and Mr Constantin Matache
- (Russia) Igor Neverov (Russian Ambassador) and Mrs Elena Neverova
- (Rwanda) Jacqueline Mukangira (Rwandan Ambassador) and Mr Charles Nahayo
- (Saudi Arabia) Abdulrahman Gdaia (Saudi Arabian Ambassador) and Princess Lubna Z.M. Al Thunayan Al Saud
- (Senegal) Henri Antoine Turpin (Senegalese Ambassador) and Mrs Virginie Turpin
- (Serbia) Ninoslav D. Stojadinovi (Serbian Ambassador) and Mrs Andjelka Stojadinovi
- (Slovenia) Vojislav Šuc (Slovenian Ambassador) and Mrs Dragica Šuc
- (South Africa) Sophonia Rapulane Makgetla (South African Ambassador) and Dr Neva Makgetla
- (South Korea) Cho Hee-yong (South Korean Ambassador) and Mrs Lee Yang
- (Spain) Enrique Viguera (Spanish Ambassador) and Mrs Marta Altolaguirre
- (Sri Lanka) Ranjith P. Jayasooriya (Sri Lankan Ambassador) and Mrs Cynthia Jayasooriya
- (Sudan) Moses Mojwok Akol (Sudanese Ambassador) and Mrs Suzan John Ayowk Ajang
- (Switzerland) Kurt Höchner (Swiss Ambassador) and Mrs Gila Höchner
- (United Arab Emirates) Sheikha Najla Al Qassimi (United Arab Emirati Ambassador)
- (Thailand) Thanarat Thanaputti (Thai Ambassador)
- (Turkey) Zergün Korutürk (Turkish Ambassador) and H.R. Mr Selah Korutürk (Ambassador)
- (Ukraine) Yevgen Perebyinis (Ukrainian Ambassador), Mrs Olha Perebyinis, and Mrs Ana Bernaldo De Quiros
- (Uruguay) Manuel Vieira Merola (Uruguayan Ambassador) and Mrs Marta Dieste Friedheim
- (Vatican City) Archbishop Emil Paul Tscherrig (Apostolic Nuncio)
- (Vietnam) Nguyen Duc Hoa (Vietnamese Ambassador) and Mrs Tran Nguyen Anh Thu
- (Zambia) Anne Luzongo Mtamboh (Zambian Ambassador)
- (Zimbabwe) Mary Sibusisiwe Mubi (Zimbabwean Ambassador)

=== Confederation of Swedish Enterprise ===
- President Signhild Arnegård Hansen, Confederation of Swedish Enterprise, and Director Michael Hansen
- Director Kenneth Bengtsson, ICA Handlarnas AB, and Mrs Ann-Kristin Bengtsson

=== Organisations ===
- Anna Ekström (Chairwoman of the Swedish Confederation of Professional Associations (SACO)) and Lars Ekström, M.Eng
- Chairman Sture Nordh, Confederation of Professional Employees (TCO), and HR Supervisor Gudrun Nordh
- Marcus Storch, MD (Hon), Chairman of the Nobel Foundation, and Mrs Gunilla Storch

Secretary General Karin Mattsson Weijber, Swedish Sports Confederation, and Mr Henric Weijber

=== Culture, media ===
- Theatre Director Birgitta Svendén, Theatre Director from 1 April 2010, and Director Thomas Svendén
- Lord in waiting and Concert Hall Director Stefan Forsberg, Stockholm Concert Hall, and Mrs Els-Marie Forsberg
- Director Peter Hansson, CEO of the Gothenburg Opera, and Kristina Hansson
- Director Eva Hamilton, VD, SVT, and Karl-Johan von Heland
- Head of Swedish Radio Mats Svegfors, CEO Sveriges Radio AB, and Rigmor Svegfors
- Director Jan Scherman, TV4, and Mrs Margareta Scherman
- Editor-in-Chief Jan Helin, Aftonbladet, and Lawyer Charlotte Helin
- Journalist Simon Johnson, Thomson Reuters
- Ebba von Sydow (journalist)

=== The Royal Academies and others ===
- Peter Englund (Permanent Secretary Professor at the Swedish Academy) and Josefin Englund
- Gunnar Öquist (Permanent Secretary Professor at the Royal Academy of Sciences) and Mrs Gunvor Öquist
- Professor Gunnel Engwall (President of the Royal Academy of Letters, History and Antiquities)
- Professor Sara von Arnold (President of the Royal Swedish Academy of Agriculture and Forestry)
- President Ulla Fries, the Royal Swedish Academy of Arts, and Dr Tor-Göran Henriksson
- Master of the King's Music Professor Kjell Ingebretsen, President of the Royal Academy of Music, and Music Director Elisabeth Ingebretsen
- Professor Bo Huldt (Director of the Royal Swedish Academy of War Sciences)

=== Patronage ===
- Director Lena M. Lindén, Ph.D. (Hon), Nordens Ark
- Professor Johnny Ludvigsson, Chairman of the Child Diabetes Foundation
- Director of Development Aid Christer Åkesson, the Church of Sweden's International Development Aid (Lutherhjälpen)
- Director of the Secretariat Siw Dreber, Radiohjälpen, Victoria Fund
- Director Magnus N:son Engelbäck, Young Enterprise association
- Operational Manager Kennet Fröjd, Swedish Development Centre for Disability Sport
- National Director Annette Rihagen, Swedish Women's Voluntary Defence Organisation, and Director Thord Axelsson
- Agnetha Mbuyamba (Secretary General for the National Association for Disabled Children and Youths)
- Baron Johan Nordenfalk (Chairman of the Friends of the Nordic Museum and Skansen) and Baroness Anna Lena Nordenfalk
- Professor Lars Olson (Chairman of Karolinska Institutet's Nobel Assembly)

=== Other ===
- Herman and Birgitta Lindqvist
- Dick Harrison and Katarina Lindbergh
- Tommy and Anna Möller
- Thomas Ohlson and Liana Lopez
- Antonia Axelson Johnson and Göran Ennerfelt
- Mats Jansson and Karin Orehag-Jansson
- Jacob Wallenberg and Annika Levin
- Marcus Wallenberg and Fanny Sachs
- Melker and Kerstin Schörling
- Fredrik and Anne-Marie Lundberg
- Bertil and Lisbeth Hult
- Peter Wallenberg Jr. and Katarina Ozolins
- Leif and Eva Johansson
- Cristina Stenbeck and Alex Fitzgibbons
- Dan Sten Olsson and Jane Olsson Thorburn
- Gustaf and Ulla-Britt Sjökvist
- Ulla-Britta Wahlberg
- Gerda Johansson
- Kerstin Johansson
- Hannelore Sjöblom
- Lars G. and Katarina Malmer
- Claes and Michaela Kalborg
- Elsa and Mats Victorin
- Sophie Tolstoy Regen
- Jimmy Meurling
- Peggy and Jan Bruzelius
- Jan and Kerstin Eliasson
- Håkan Norelius
- Roderick Martin
- Malena Ernman and Svante Thunberg
- Martin and Karin Fröst
- Lisa Nilsson and Niklas Medin
- Peter Jöback and Oscar Nilsson
- Per and Åsa Gessle

=== Personal friends ===
- Mr Johan Beckman and Lady-in-waiting Mrs Eliane de Gunzburg Beckman
- Countess Beck-Friis
- State Secretary for Foreign Affairs Frank Belfrage and Interior Designer Helena Belfrage
- Registered Doctor Michaël Berglund and Caroline Berglund, B.A.
- Director Hans Eric Brodin and Mrs Eva Benita Brodin
- Baron Carl de Geer and Baroness Christina de Geer
- Ambassador Ulf Dinkelspiel and Educational Adviser Mrs Louise Dinkelspiel
- Department Head Marianne von der Esch
- Director Sven Philip Sörensen and Mrs Marie-Louise Sörensen
- Director Anders Lettström and Mrs Christina Lettström
- Commander Bertil Nordström
- Mrs Agneta Kreuger and Director Lars Abrahamson
- Director Jan Öhrvall and Photographer Gunilla Öhrvall
- Chairman Stefan Persson, H&M AB, and Mrs Denise Persson
- Mrs Annika Kahm
- Baron Gustaf Banér and Baroness Agneta Banér
- Miss Christina Banér
- Dr e.h. Achim Middelschulte and Frau Beate Middelschulte
- Mr J. Christer Elfverson
- Mrs Signe von der Esch
- Mr Gilbert E. Kaplan and Mrs Lena Kaplan

=== The bride and groom's personal friends ===
- Dr Constantin Beier and Dr Amelie Beier Middelschulte
- Mr Michael Broms and Anna Jussil Broms, LL.M.
- Mr Marten Bunnemann and Mrs Annika Bunnemann
- Captain Christoffer Cederlund and Mrs Charlotte Kreuger Cederlund
- Baron Jacob de Geer and Baroness Nicole de Geer
- Mr Peder Dinkelspiel and Mrs Caroline Dinkelspiel
- Mr Niclas Engsäll and Mrs Andrea Engsäll
- Mrs Josephine Génetay and Mr Anderson Zapata Diaz
- Mr Marcus Josefsson and Mrs Sophie Josefsson
- Mr Jesper Nilsson and Mrs Caroline Nilsson
- Director Karl-Johan Persson and Mrs Leonie Persson
- Mr Gustaf Wiiburg and Mrs Rebecka Wiiburg
- Mr Patrik Vrbanc and Mrs Camilla Vrbanc Vidjeskog
- Mr Lars Hellström and Mrs Johanna Hellström
- Mr Niklas Ek and Mrs Anna Ek
- Mr Andreas Nylin and Mrs Carina Nylin
- Director Alessandro Catenacci and Mrs Susanne Catenacci
- Mr Patrik Gummeson and Mrs Linda Gummeson
- Jesper Ederth, Ph.D., and Registered Doctor Helena Ederth
- Mr Oscar Hallberg and Mrs Veronica Bångfeldt
- Mr Emil Larsson and Mrs Therése Danneman
- Mr Fredrik Arnander and Mrs Jennifer Arnander
- Mr Johan Skarborg and Mrs Carolina Skarborg
- Mr Staffan Svensson and Mrs Lena Svensson
- Mr Martin Brunehult Wermelin and Mrs Marie Wermelin
- Director Erik Paulsson, PEAB, and Mrs Gunilla Paulsson
- Director Anders Lindberg, JKL Stockholm, and Civil Economist Eva Lindberg
- Mr Hans Boman and Mrs Marianne Boman
- Mr Björn Örås and Mrs Bibbi Örås
- Consul General Barbro Osher and Mr Bernard Osher
- Mr David M. D. Greenfeld and Mrs Dorothy Greenfeld
- Mr Micael Bindefeld and Mr Nicklas Sigurdsson
- Mrs Sara Matson Westover and Mr James Westover
- Dr Diane Mickley and Dr Steven Mickley
- Chairman Michael Treschow and Professor Lena Treschow Torell
- Jörgen Elofsson (composer) and Mrs Christina Elofsson
- Professor Christopher Gillberg and Carina Gillberg
- Director Lars Enochson and Mrs Elisabeth Enochson
- Miss Louise Gottlieb and Baron Gustav Thott

== Wedding banquet ==
The wedding banquet was held on the night of the wedding day in the Hall of State at the Royal Palace of Stockholm, Sweden's finest ceremonial hall. The Hall of State was renovated for the occasion. 98 guests of the nearly 600 invited guests were accommodated in the main table. Pink and white flowers were strewn over the table decorations, which included silver candelabra and silver bowls. On the seats of honour were sitting the wedding couple; their parents King Carl Gustaf and Queen Silvia and Mr and Mrs Westling; Victoria's godparents Ralf de Toledo Sommerlath, Princess Désirée, Baroness Silfverschiöld, the Queen of the Netherlands and the King of Norway as well as Count Carl Johan Bernadotte of Wisborg, the King's uncle; Princess Margaretha, Mrs. Ambler, the King's eldest sister; the Queen of Denmark, the King of the Belgians; Tarja Halonen, the President of Finland; and Anders Wejryd, the Archbishop of Uppsala.

== Cake ==
The cake was an 11 tiered cake made of organic ingredients. The sides of the cake were decorated with four-leaf clovers, symbolising the crown princely couple and their wedding. Each layer of the cake was topped with several chocolate wafers with the royal couple's monogram in caramel. The top layer had a large version of the crown princely couple's monogram, reproduced in cast caramel. The crown princely couple's wedding cake was a gift from the Swedish Association of Bakers and Confectioners.

== Titles for Daniel Westling ==
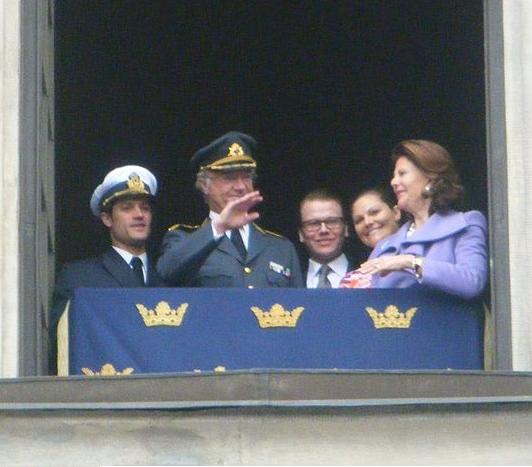
Daniel Westling and Victoria along with the royal family in April 2010

Sweden has only practiced absolute cognatic primogeniture since 1980 (SFS 1979:932). This means that Victoria is the first female heir apparent to marry. Westling became the first man of the people to obtain a new title or rank as the spouse of a Swedish princess since the Middle Ages. All previous princes have been born to royal parents of Swedish origin or have been foreign dukes that have married Swedish princesses. As a result, questions arose as to how Westling would be known after the wedding.

The Swedish Royal Court first announced on 20 February 2010 that upon his marriage to Crown Princess Victoria, who is Duchess of Västergötland, Westling would receive the titles of "Prince Daniel" and "Duke of Västergötland". It was further announced in May 2010, by the Swedish Royal Court, that Westling will be granted the style His Royal Highness upon his marriage to Crown Princess Victoria. He will thus be known as Prince Daniel, Duke of Västergötland. The last part of his title corresponds in form to the style used by other Swedish princes, including Victoria's younger brother Prince Carl Philip, Duke of Värmland, i.e. Prince + Given name + Duke of Swedish Province. The novelty here is that Westling would be using his wife's ducal title, something new for men in Sweden.

Sweden discontinued in the 17th century the grant of provinces as territorial appanages to royal princes which, as dukes thereof, they had governed semi-autonomously. Since then, these provincial dukedoms exist in the royal family only nominally, but each prince or princess traditionally maintains a special public connection to one. The sons of Swedish kings have held the princely title as a rank of nobility (e.g. Fredrik Vilhelm, Prince (Furste) av Hessenstein), as a courtesy title for an ex-dynast (e.g. Prince (Prins) Oscar Bernadotte) and, most often, as a royal dynast (e.g. Prince Bertil of Sweden, Duke of Halland).

== See also ==
- Säpojoggen
- Jewels of the Swedish royal family
- Wedding of Princess Madeleine of Sweden and Christopher O'Neill
