= Siöblad =

- Carl Georg Siöblad (1683-1754), Swedish naval officer and Governor of Malmö
- Erik Siöblad (1683–1700), a governor of Blekinge County, Sweden
