= Eva Eriksson =

Eva Eriksson may refer to:

- Eva Lund (born Eva Eriksson in 1971), Swedish curler
- Eva Eriksson (politician), county governor in Sweden
- Eva Eriksson (illustrator) (born 1949), Swedish illustrator and writer
