= Helena Jonsson =

Helena Jonsson can refer to:

- Helena Jonsson (county governor) (born 1965), Swedish county governor
- Helena Ekholm née Jonsson (born 1984), Swedish biathlete
