= John Chipman (international relations expert) =

British international relations expert (born 1957)

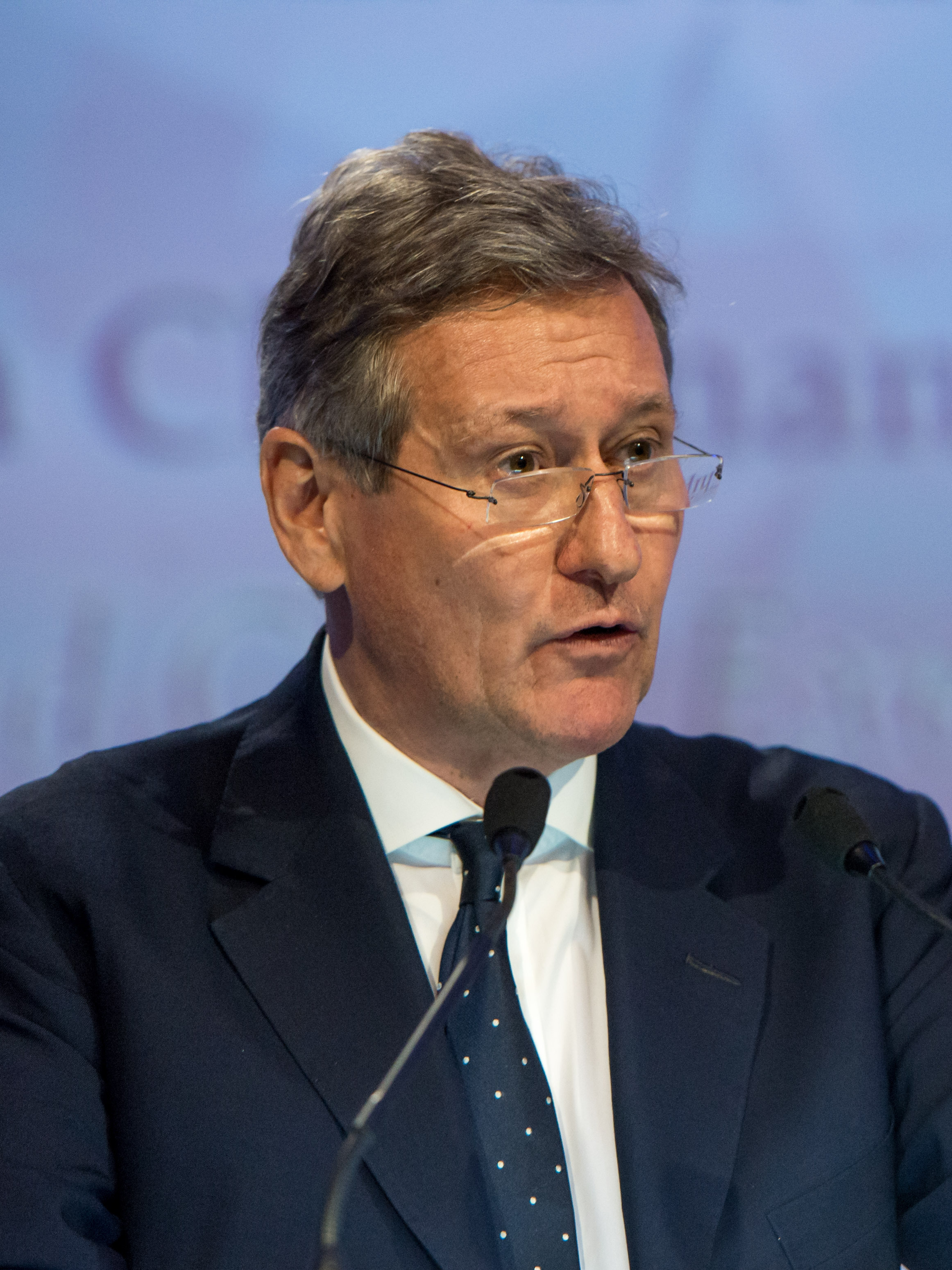
Chipman in 2017

Sir John Miguel Warwick Chipman KCMG (born 10 February 1957) is a British international relations expert, specialising in international security. He was director-general and chief executive of the International Institute for Strategic Studies (IISS) from 1993 to 2023, where he is currently executive chairman. Prior to that, he served as a Research Associate (1983–84), Assistant Director (1987–90) and Director of Studies (1990–93) at the IISS, with a spell (1985–87) as a Research Associate at the Atlantic Institute for International Affairs. Since 2024 he has been a senior adviser to the global investment firm Centricus.

He was appointed Companion of the Order of St Michael and St George (CMG) in the 1999 Birthday Honours and Knight Commander of the Order of St Michael and St George (KCMG) in the 2023 Birthday Honours for services to international peace and security. Chipman has a BA (Hons) degree from Harvard University, an MA from the London School of Economics and an MPhil and DPhil from Balliol College, University of Oxford.

== Selected works ==
- French Military Policy and African Security. London: International Institute for Strategic Studies (1985). ISBN 978-0860790921.
- NATO's Southern Allies: Internal and External Challenges. London: Routledge (1988). ISBN 978-0415004855.
- French Power in Africa. Oxford: Blackwell (1989). ISBN 978-0631168195.
