= Ulrica Messing =

Swedish politician (born 1968)

Governor of Blekinge County
- Incumbent
- Assumed office 1 October 2021
- Monarch: Carl XVI Gustaf
- Prime Minister: Stefan Löfven; Magdalena Andersson; Ulf Kristersson
- Preceded by: Sten Nordin

Minister for Infrastructure
- In office 16 October 2000 – 6 October 2006
- Prime Minister: Göran Persson
- Preceded by: Björn Rosengren
- Succeeded by: Åsa Torstensson

Minister for Integration, Sports and Youth
- In office 6 October 1998 – 16 October 2000
- Prime Minister: Göran Persson
- Preceded by: Lars Engqvist (Integration)
- Succeeded by: Mona Sahlin (Integration)

Minister for Labour Legislation and Gender Equality
- In office 22 March 1996 – 6 October 1998
- Prime Minister: Göran Persson
- Preceded by: Leif Blomberg
- Succeeded by: Margareta Winberg

Personal details
- Born: 31 January 1968 (age 58) Hällefors, Sweden
- Party: Social Democrats
- Spouse: Torsten Jansson (m. 2009)

Ulrica Messing (born 31 January 1968) is a Swedish politician and civil servant who has served as Governor of Blekinge County since 2021. A member of the Social Democratic Party, she previously served as Minister for Infrastructure from 2000 to 2006.

Messing was Member of Parliament (MP) from 1991 to 2007, representing Gävleborg County. She was chairman of the parliamentary Committee for Defence from 2006 to 2007, when she resigned from Parliament and ended her political career.

== Political career ==
Messing completed high school in 1987. She began her political career in the Swedish Social Democratic Youth League and was a member of the Municipal Council in Hofors Municipality from 1989. In 1991 she was elected to the Riksdag as a Member of Parliament. From 1993 she was a member of the National Board of the Swedish Social Democratic Party.

In 1996 Prime Minister Göran Persson made her a minister. She first served in the Ministry of Labour, from 1998 in the Ministry of Culture, and from 2000 in the Ministry of Industry, Employment and Communications.

During her time as Minister for Communications, Ministry of Industry, Employment and Communications from 2000 to 2006 she was in charge of Swedish arms exports. During her tenure, the volume of Sweden's arms exports grew to become the ninth largest in the world (2005). It increased from 4.4 billion SEK in 2000 to 8.6 billion SEK in 2006. One arms deal during this time that attracted particular criticism was the Swedish company SAAB's export of airplanes to Pakistan, under military rule at the time, in a deal worth 8.3 billion SEK (about US$1.2 billion).

== Personal life ==
Born in Hällefors, she is married to Swedish businessman and multimillionaire Torsten Jansson since 2009.

In 2008 Messing opened a design store called Porthouse Interior in Gothenburg.

Political offices
Preceded by Leif Blomberg	Minister for Labour Legislation and Gender Equality; 1996–1998	Succeeded by Margareta Winberg; Minister for Gender Equality
Preceded by Lars Engqvist; Minister for Integration	Minister for Integration, Sports and Youth; 1998–2000	Succeeded by Mona Sahlin; Minister for Integration
Preceded by Björn Rosengren	Minister for Infrastructure; 2000–2006	Succeeded by Åsa Torstensson
Government offices
Preceded by Sten Nordin	Governor of Blekine County; 2021—	Succeeded by Incumbent
