= Berit Andnor =

Swedish Social Democratic politician

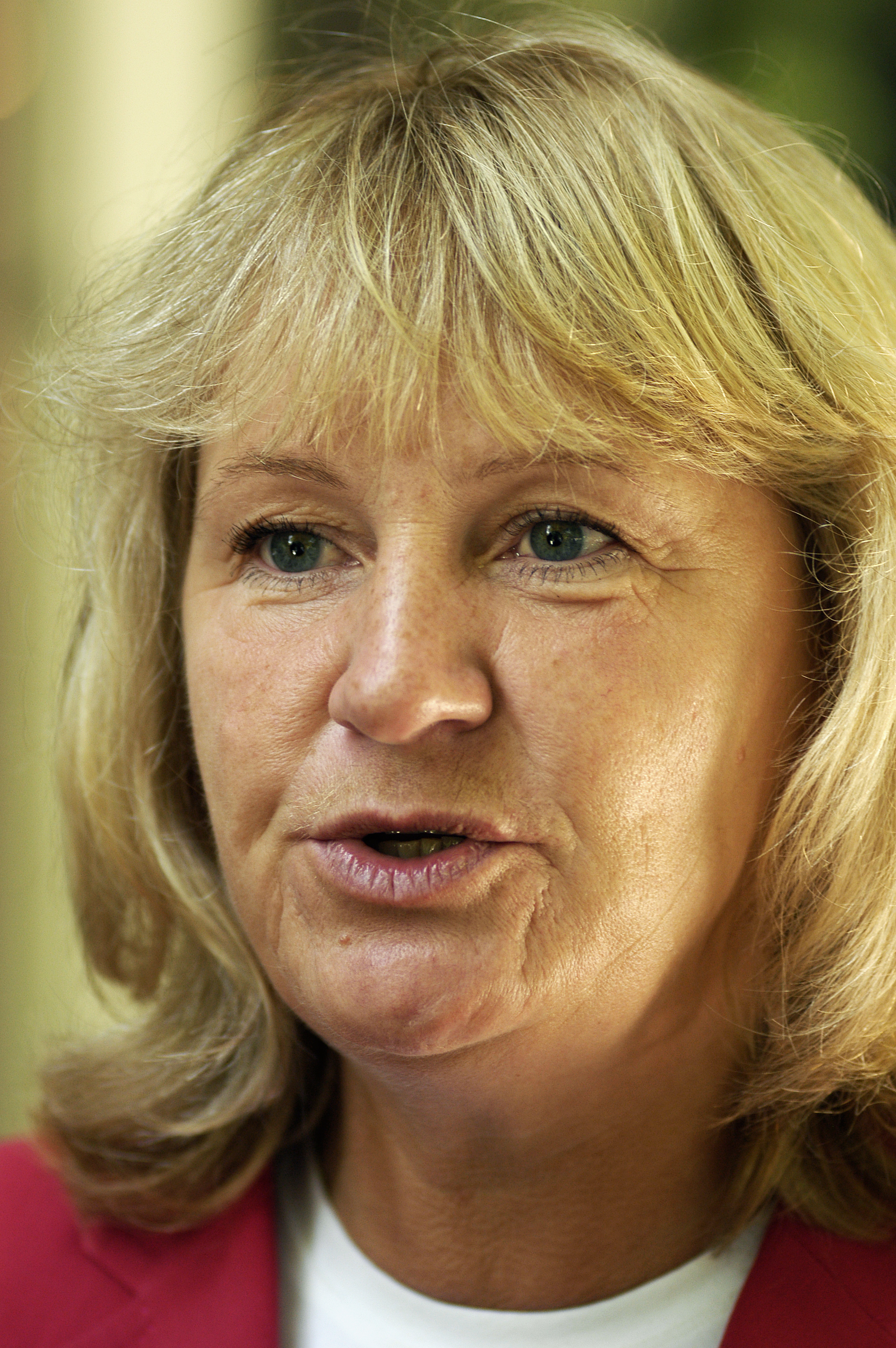
- Andnor in June 2005

Minister for Health and Social Affairs
- In office 1 October 2004 – 6 October 2006
- Prime Minister: Göran Persson
- Preceded by: Lars Engqvist
- Succeeded by: Göran Hägglund

Member of the Riksdag
- In office 1991–2010

37th Governor of Blekinge County
- In office 1 October 2011 – 1 October 2017
- Prime Minister: Fredrik Reinfeldt; Stefan Löfven
- Preceded by: Gunvor Engström
- Succeeded by: Sten Nordin

Personal details
- Born: Berit Andnor Bylund; 20 November 1954 (age 71) Gothenburg, Sweden
- Party: Social Democrats
- Education: University College of Östersund

Berit Andnor (born 20 November 1954) is a Swedish Social Democratic politician. She was Minister for Social Affairs of Sweden 2004–2006.

== Biography ==
Berit Andnor grew up in a working-class family in Gothenburg, and she and her sister were the first in their family to be given the opportunity to obtain a higher education. She has a University Diploma in Social Work from the University College of Östersund (now Mid Sweden University) in Jämtland, and since then, she has been living in the region.

In the 1980s, she worked as director of social welfare services in Berg Municipality. In 1982, she was elected to the county council, and from 1986 to 1991, she sat on its executive board, the beginning of her career as a full-time politician. In 1991, she was elected to the Riksdag as a Member of Parliament. She chose to focus her work as a parliamentarian on gender equality issues and labour market policy.

Since then, Andnor has held a number of high-ranking posts, such as vice-president of the Council of Europe parliamentarian assembly, 1996–1998, and chair of the Swedish National Labour Market Board, 1997–2000. She has also been a member of the executive committee of National Federation of Social Democratic Women in Sweden from 1995 to 2003.

Still, her name was not very known to the public when Prime Minister Göran Persson made her Minister for Children and Families in 2002. On 1 November 2004, she became Minister for Social Affairs.

From October 2006 until 2010, she was the chairman of the Riksdags committee on the constitution, and after the 2010 election, she left the Riksdag.

In 2011, she was appointed governor of Blekinge County with a term from 1 October 2011 to 30 September 2017. She succeeded Gunvor Engström.
