= Helena Jonsson (county governor) =

Swedish civil servant

Governor of Jönköping County
- In office 15 January 2018 – 14 January 2024
- Monarch: Carl XVI Gustaf
- Prime Minister: Stefan Löfven; Magdalena Andersson; Ulf Kristersson
- Preceded by: Håkan Sörman
- Succeeded by: Brittis Benzler

Personal details
- Born: 18 August 1965 (age 61) Eksjö, Jönköping County, Sweden
- Spouse(s): Göran Johansson (m. 1990)
- Education: Swedish University of Agricultural Sciences
- Occupation: Agricultural technologist

Maria Helena Jonsson (born 18 August 1965) is a Swedish civil servant who served as Governor of Jönköping County from 15 January 2018 to 14 January 2024. She previously served as chairperson of the Federation of Swedish Farmers from 2011 to 2017.

Agricultural organizations
Preceded by Lars-Göran Pettersson	Chairperson of the Federation of Swedish Farmers; 2011–2017	Succeeded by Palle Borgström
Government offices
Preceded by Håkan Sörman	Governor of Jönköping County; 2018–2024	Succeeded by Brittis Benzler
