= Minoo Akhtarzand =

Iranian-Swedish civil servant (born 1956)

Minoo Akhtarzand Kon:sGM12mserafb
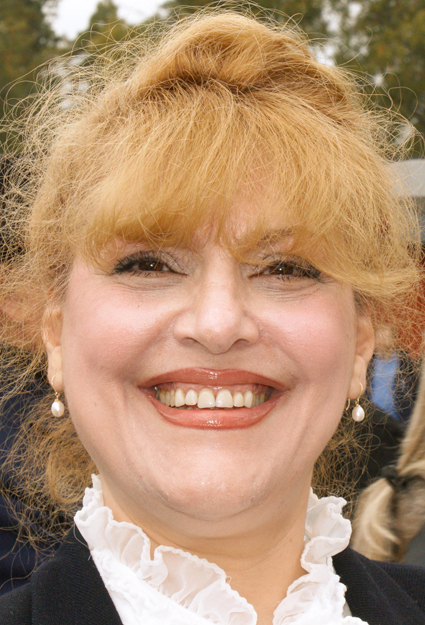
- Photograph of Ahtarzand in 2013.

5th Director-general of the Swedish Rail Administration
- In office 1 February 2008 – 2010
- Preceded by: Per-Olof Granbom
- Succeeded by: none; see merging

Personal details
- Born: 1 December 1956 (age 69) Tehran, Pahlavi Iran
- Education: Royal Institute of Technology
- Awards: See honours

Minoo Hilda Akhtarzand (Swedish pronunciation; Persian: مینو اختر زند; born 1 December 1956) is an Iranian-Swedish civil servant. Between 2008–2010 and 2010–2016, she served as Director-general of the Swedish Rail Administration and Governor of Jönköping County respectively.

== Biography ==
She was born and raised in Tehran, Iran. Her father was a high-ranking officer in the Iranian Imperial Guard. At 17 years of age, she moved to Stockholm and attend the Royal Institute of Technology to study electrical engineering. Later, she held various managerial posts at Vattenfall AB, the state-owned energy company, and was the director of the former Uppsala-based regional labour agency.

In February 2008 and June 2009, she was appointed Director-general of the Swedish Rail Administration and was elected vice-president of the European Rail Infrastructure Managers respectively. By the merge of the former and the Swedish Road Administration, to create the Swedish Transport Administration, she became the last director-general of the government agency. In September 2010, she was appointed Governor of Jönköping County.

== Honours ==
- His Majesty The King's Medal of the 12th size gold medal on Seraphim Order ribbon (2022)

Civic offices
Preceded by Lars Engqvist	Governor of Jönköping County; 2010–2016	Succeeded by Håkan Sörman
Preceded by Håkan Wåhlstedt	Governor of Västmanland County; 2016–2021	Succeeded by Ulrica Gradin as acting
