= Ingemar Skogö =

Swedish civil servant (1949–2019)

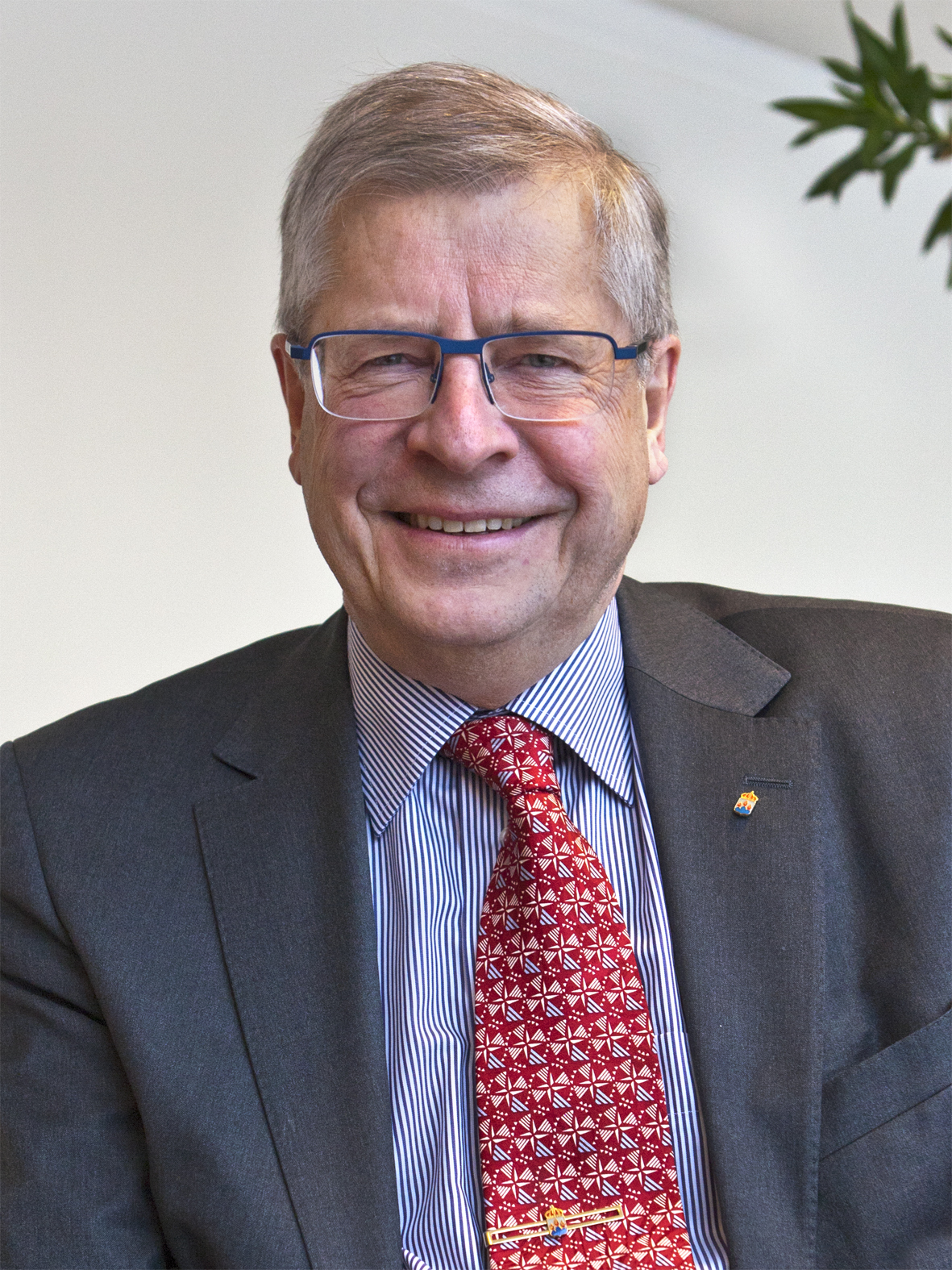
Skogö in 2013

Ingemar Skogö (4 January 1949 – 28 May 2019) was a Swedish civil servant. Born in Tranås, Skogö was a graduate of Lund University. He served as the Governor of Västmanland County from 2009 to 2015. Skogö was also the Director-General of the Civil Aviation Administration from 1992 to 2001, and the Swedish Road Administration from 2001 to 2009.

Skogö died on 28 May 2019, at the age of 70.
