= International Institute for Strategic Studies =

British international affairs think tank

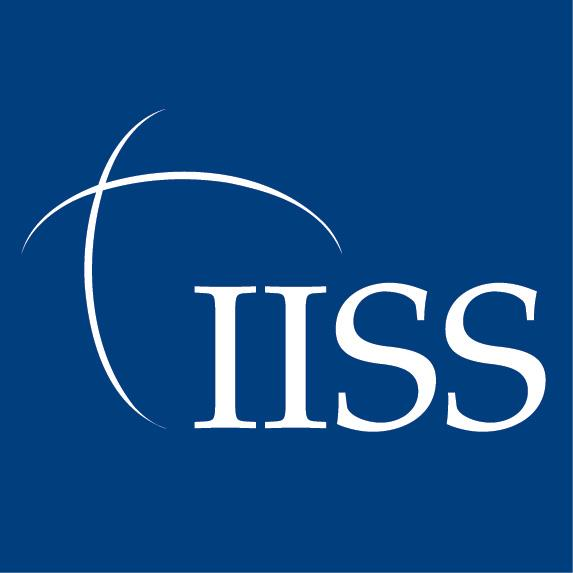
- Logo
- Abbreviation: IISS
- Formation: 1958; 68 years ago
- Type: International relations think tank
- Headquarters: London, England, United Kingdom; 51.511502°N 0.113550°W
- Director-General and Chief Executive: Bastian Giegerich
- Website: www.iiss.org

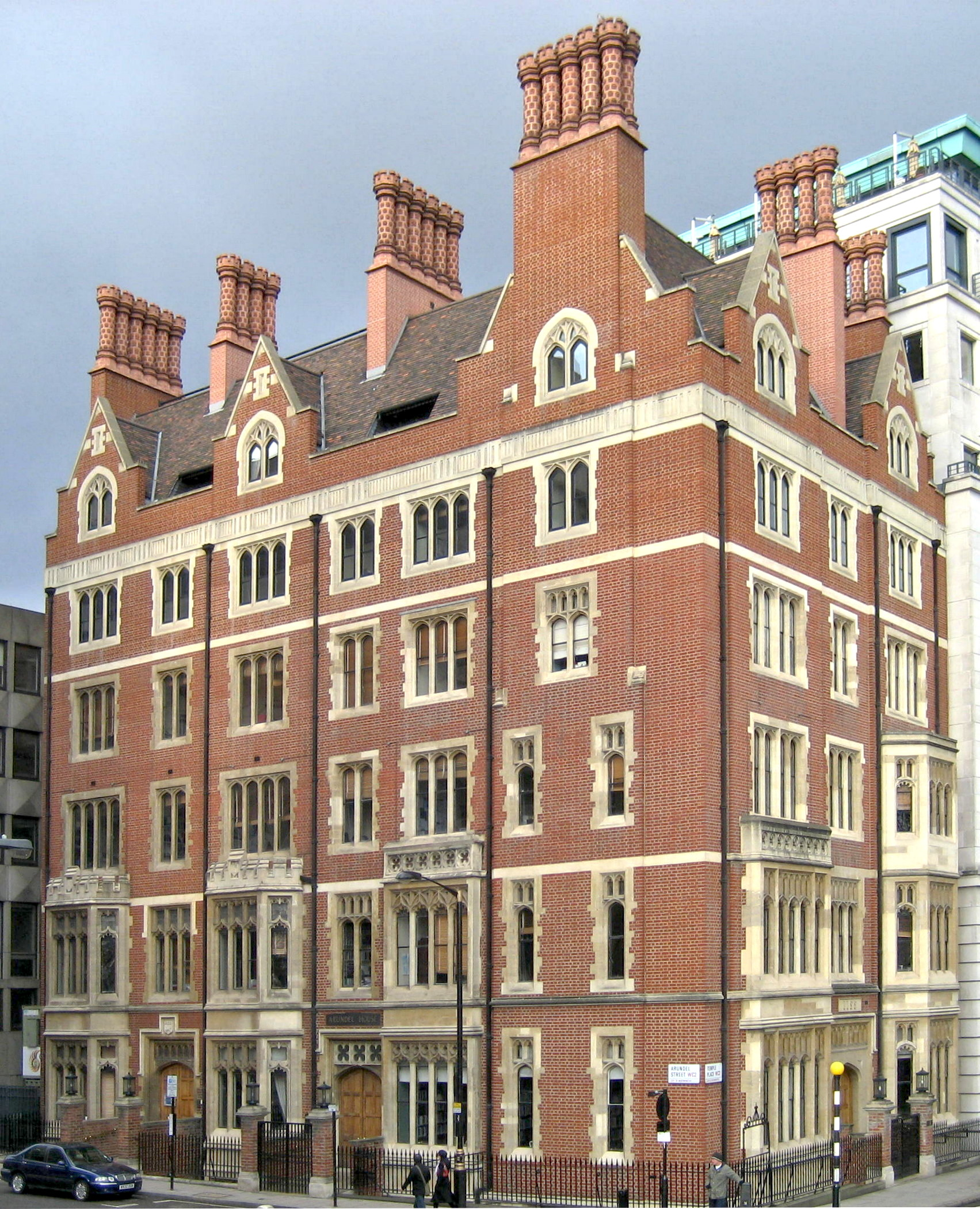
Headquarters at Arundel House, Temple, London

The International Institute for Strategic Studies (IISS) is an international research institute or think tank focusing on defence and security issues. Since 1997, its headquarters have been at Arundel House in London. It has offices on four continents, producing data and research on questions of defence, security and global affairs, publishing publications and online analysis, and convening major security summits. The Guardian newspaper has described the IISS as 'one of the world's leading security think tanks.'

The current Director-General and Chief Executive is Bastian Giegerich while Sir John Chipman is the Executive Chairman.

The 2017 Global Go To Think Tank Index ranked IISS as the tenth-best think tank worldwide and the second-best Defence and National Security think tank globally; Think Tank Alert ranked it as the top, most-cited non-US-based think tank in 2025; while Transparify ranked it third-largest UK think tank by expenditure, but gave it its lowest rating, describing it as deceptive on funding transparency.

== Research ==
The institute has worked with governments, defence ministries and global organisations such as NATO.

== Advisory services ==
The IISS provides 'strategic advice and political risk analysis to government and commercial clients'.

== Publications ==
In 2011 the institute published the FARC files—documents captured from the Revolutionary Armed Forces of Colombia that shed light on the movement's inner workings.

The 2017 Global Go To Think Tank Index ranked the Shangri-La Dialogue as the best Think tank conference worldwide.

== History ==
The Institute for Strategic Studies (ISS), as it was originally known, was founded in 1958, following a conference in January 1957, which gathered together the main voices interested in the nuclear issues of the day. Military historian Michael Howard chaired a group which recommended that 'we should set up a body whose primary purpose should be the collection and dissemination of information about nuclear weapons and their implications for international relations...And so the Institute was born.'

Its first director was the defence journalist Alastair Buchan, and its first president the former Labour prime minister Clement Attlee.

While the Institute's initial composition was mainly British, from 1968 the council were joined by Australian and Japanese members. Because of this, it was renamed the International Institute for Strategic Studies (IISS) in 1971.

Since then, the IISS has convened many private discussion groups and conferences and also hosted influential public events and lectures. The 1977 Alastair Buchan memorial lecture, delivered by West German Chancellor Helmut Schmidt (an Institute member since 1959), which became known as one of the key appeals for 'Euromissiles' to counter new Soviet intermediate-range missiles.

In 2016, The Guardian reported that IISS "has been accused of jeopardising its independence after leaked documents showed it has secretly received £25m from the Bahraini royal family", noting that leaked "documents reveal that IISS and Bahrain's rulers specifically agreed to keep the latter's funding for the Manama Dialogues secret". The IISS did not dispute the authenticity of the leaked documents or deny receiving funding from Bahrain, but issued a response stating that "[a]ll IISS contractual agreements, including those with host governments, contain a clause asserting the institute's absolute intellectual and operational independence as an international organisation that does not participate in any manner of advocacy".

Peter Oborne in Middle East Eye subsequently reported that IISS may have received nearly half of its total income from Bahraini sources during the 2010s.

The IISS moved to new headquarters at Arundel House in 2000. In 2023, the IISS had approximately 160 employees and an annual turnover of more than £25 million.

Raymond L. Garthoff wrote in 2004:

In 1959 the IISS issued a pamphlet on the "military balance" between the Soviet Union and NATO. It was unfortunately replete with errors, having been put together from published sources of widely varying quality. I called this to the attention of Alastair Buchan, the director of the institute, who was quite disturbed. A new version was issued in November 1960, much more correct and accurate, though still not up to the latest intelligence. Again, I called this to Buchan's attention, and he undertook to check out with British authorities what became annual issuances.

== Major funders ==
Major funders contributing £100,000 or more:

- Airbus
- Lockheed Martin Corporation
- BAE Systems
- Raytheon
- Boeing Company
- Rolls-Royce
- General Atomics Aeronautical Systems
- Taylor & Francis

== Directors ==
- Alastair Buchan (1958–1969)
- François Duchêne (1969–1974)
- Christoph Bertram (1974–1982)
- Robert J. O'Neill (1982–1987)
- François Heisbourg (1987–1992)
- Bo Huldt (1992–1993)
- John Chipman (1993–2023)
- Bastian Giegerich (2023-present)

== Governance ==
The IISS is a registered charity, and fundraising is overseen by the board of trustees.

The trustees appoint members of the IISS Council, the institute's intellectual advisory body. Both the trustees and the council have an international composition. The director-general and chief executive (Bastian Giegerich) and the executive chairman (Sir John Chipman KCMG) both report to the chairman of the trustees.

As of February 2024, the trustees of the IISS were:

- Bill Emmott (chairman of the trustees), chairman of the Japan Society (UK); former editor in chief, The Economist;
- Caroline Atkinson, Senior Advisor, Rock Creek; former head, Global Policy, Google; former Deputy National Security Adviser, International Economics, Obama Administration;
- Neha Aviral, principal, ghSMART;
- Hakeem Belo-Osagie, chairman, FSDH Holding Company; chairman of the Board of Trustees, Harvard Centre for African Studies
- John O. Brennan, former director, Central Intelligence Agency;
- Chris Jones, director, Becton, Dickinson and Co;
- Chung Min Lee, (chairman of the Advisory Council); professor, Institute of Convergence and Security Affairs, Korea Advanced Institute for Science and Technology; Senior Fellow, Asia Programme, Carnegie Endowment for International Peace
- Florence Parly, Former Minister of the Armed Forces, France
- Kasper Rørsted, Former CEO of Adidas; Former CEO of Henkel; Member of the Board of Directors, AP Moller-Maersk; Member of Supervisory Board Siemens AG;
- Lord Sedwill, Former Cabinet Secretary and National Security Adviser, Cabinet Office, UK; chair of the Atlantic Future Forum;
- Grace Reksten Skaugen, Co-founder and Board Member, Norwegian Institute of Directors; chair, Euronav NV; chair, Orrön Energy AB (formerly Lundin);
- Matthew Symonds Co-founder, The Independent; former Defence and Security Editor, The Economist; former Executive Director, The Lawrence Ellison Foundation

The Advisory Council is composed of:

- Chung Min Lee (chairman of the Advisory Council)
- Joanne de Asis, president, Globe Capital Partners; Senior Advisor, Morgan Stanley
- Caroline Atkinson,
- Linden P. Blue, chief executive officer, General Atomics Aeronautical Systems
- Garvin Brown, chairman, Brown-Forman Corporation
- General Sir Mark Carleton-Smith, GCB, CBE, Former Chief of the General Staff, British Army;
- Alejandro Santo Domingo, Chairman of Grupo Empresarial Bavaria, Colombia; managing director, Quadrant Capital Advisors,
- Bill Emmott (chairman of the Trustees)
- Thomas Enders, president, German Council on Foreign Relations; former Chief Executive Officer, Airbus
- Michael Fullilove, executive director, Lowy Institute;
- Yoichi Funabashi, Co-founder and Chairman, Asia Pacific Initiative;
- Alia Hatoug-Bouran, Senator, The Jordanian Senate; president, Parliamentary Assembly of the Mediterranean
- Eyal Hulata, Senior international fellow, Foundation for Defense of Democracies; Former National Security Advisor, Israel and Former Head of Israel's National Security Council
- Badr Jafar, President of Crescent Petroleum; CEO of Crescent Enterprises
- Bilahari Kausikan, chairman, Middle East Institute, National University of Singapore; Former Ambassador-at-Large and Policy Advisor, Ministry of Foreign Affairs, Singapore
- Thomas Lembong, director, Consilience Policy; former Chairman, Investment Coordinating Board; former Minister of Trade, Indonesia
- Eric X. Li, founder and Managing Director, Chengwei Capital
- Peter Maurer, Former President, International Committee of the Red Cross; former Ambassador and Permanent Representative of Switzerland to the United Nations
- Florence Parly;
- Lord Powell of Bayswater KCMG, Member, House of Lords; former Private Secretary and Adviser on Foreign Affairs and Defence to Prime Ministers Thatcher and Major
- Andrés Rozental, Eminent Ambassador of Mexico; President Rozental & Associates;
- Lord Sedwill,
- Debra Soon, Group Head, Marketing and Communications, Aviva Singlife Holdings
- Heizo Takenaka, Professor Emeritus, Keio University; former Minister of Internal Affairs and Communication
- Marcus Wallenberg, chairman, Skandinaviska Enskilda Banken; Chairman Saab AB; Vice Chair, Investor AB; chairman, Foundation Asset Management; director, Astra Zeneca

== See also ==
- List of think tanks in the United Kingdom
