= Åsa Torstensson =

Swedish politician (born 1958)

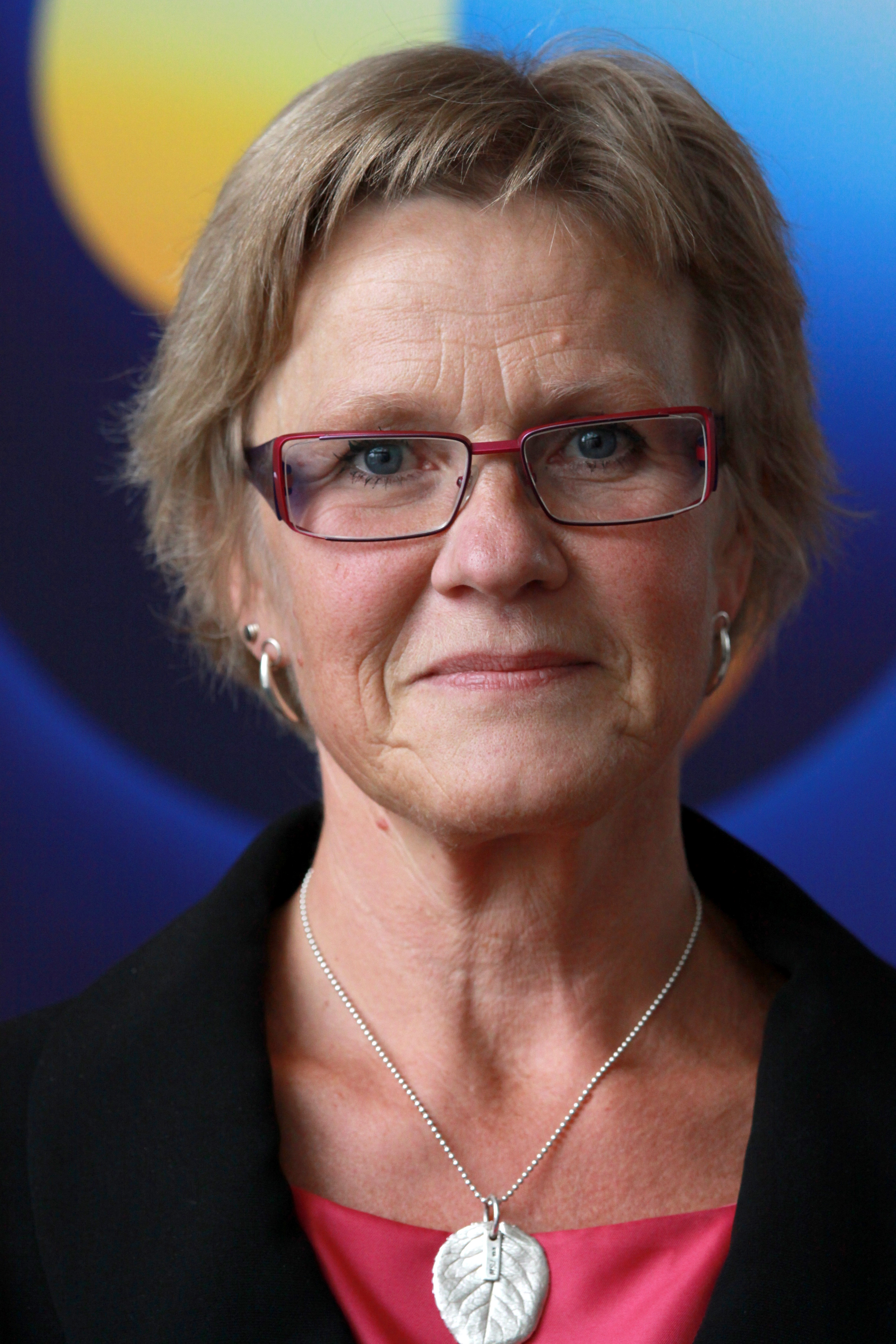

Member of Parliament
- In office 1998–2014

Personal details
- Born: 25 March 1958
- Political party: Centre Party

Åsa-Britt Maria Torstensson (born 25 March 1958) is a Swedish politician and a member of the Centre Party. She has a university degree in social work (Swedish: socionomexamen). She was a member of the Riksdag between 1998 and 2002 representing Västra Götaland County. Torstensson was re-elected to the Riksdag in the 2006 general election. On 6 October 2006 she was selected Minister for Infrastructure in the Cabinet of Fredrik Reinfeldt. After the 2010 general election, she left the cabinet and returned to the Riksdag.

Political offices
Preceded by Ulrica Messing	Minister for Infrastructure; 2006–2010	Succeeded by Catharina Elmsäter-Svärd
