= List of governors of Jönköping County =

Governor of Jönköping County
- Landshövding i Jönköpings län
- Coat of arms of Jönköping County.
- Incumbent; Brittis Benzler since 15 January 2024
- Jönköping County Administrative Board
- Residence: The residence in Jönköping, Jönköping
- Appointer: Government of Sweden
- Term length: Six years (Note: The governor is often appointed for a six-year mandate. It can be extended if the person has not reached retirement age.)
- Formation: 1634
- First holder: Bengt Kafle
- Deputy: County Director (Länsrådet)
- Salary: SEK 97,800/month (2017)
- Website: Governor and County Director

This is a list of governors for Jönköping County of Sweden, from 1634 to present.

1. Bengt Kafle (1634–1636)
2. Bengt Bagge (1636–1639)
3. Knut Soop (1639–1645)
4. Bengt Ribbing (1645–1653)
5. Gustaf Posse (1653–1658)
6. Johan Printz (1658–1663)
7. Gustaf Ribbing (1663–1672)
8. Hans Georg Mörner (1672–1685)
9. Robert Lichton (1685–1687)
10. Erik Dahlbergh (1687–1693)
11. Nils Gyllenstierna (1693–1696)
12. Mårten Lindhielm (1696–1716)
13. Georg Reinhold Patkull (1716–1718)
14. Anders Leijonhielm (1718–1727)
15. Johan von Mentzer (1728–1746)
16. Anders Tungelfeldt (1747–1751)
17. Ludvig von Saltza (1751–1762)
18. Claes Erik Silfverhielm (1762–1778)
19. Fredric Ulric Hamilton (1778–1795)
20. Eric Johan de la Grange (1795–1801)
21. Johan Axel Stedt (1801–1805)
22. Eric Gustaf Boije (1805–1815)
23. Lars Hierta (1815–1835)
24. Claes Gabriel Bergenstråhle (1835–1855)
25. Arvid Gustav Faxe (1856–1870)
26. Carl R Ekström (1870–1888)
27. Robert Dickson (1888–1892)
28. Hjalmar Palmstierna (1892–1906)
29. Fredrik E Pettersson (1906–1922)
30. Carl Malmroth (1922–1934)
  - Jakob W Spens, acting (1923–1924)
31. Felix Hamrin (1934–1937)
32. Olle Ekblom (1938–1957)
33. Allan Nordenstam (1957–1963)
34. Sven af Geijerstam (1964–1979)
35. Gösta Gunnarsson (1980–1997)
36. Birgit Friggebo (1998–2004)
37. Lars Engqvist (2004–2010)
38. Minoo Akhtarzand (2010–2016)
39. Håkan Sörman (2016–2017)
  - Anneli Wirtén, acting (2017–2018)
40. Helena Jonsson (15 January 2018–14 January 2024)
41. Brittis Benzler (15 January 2024–present)
