= Sten Nordin =

Swedish politician and mayor

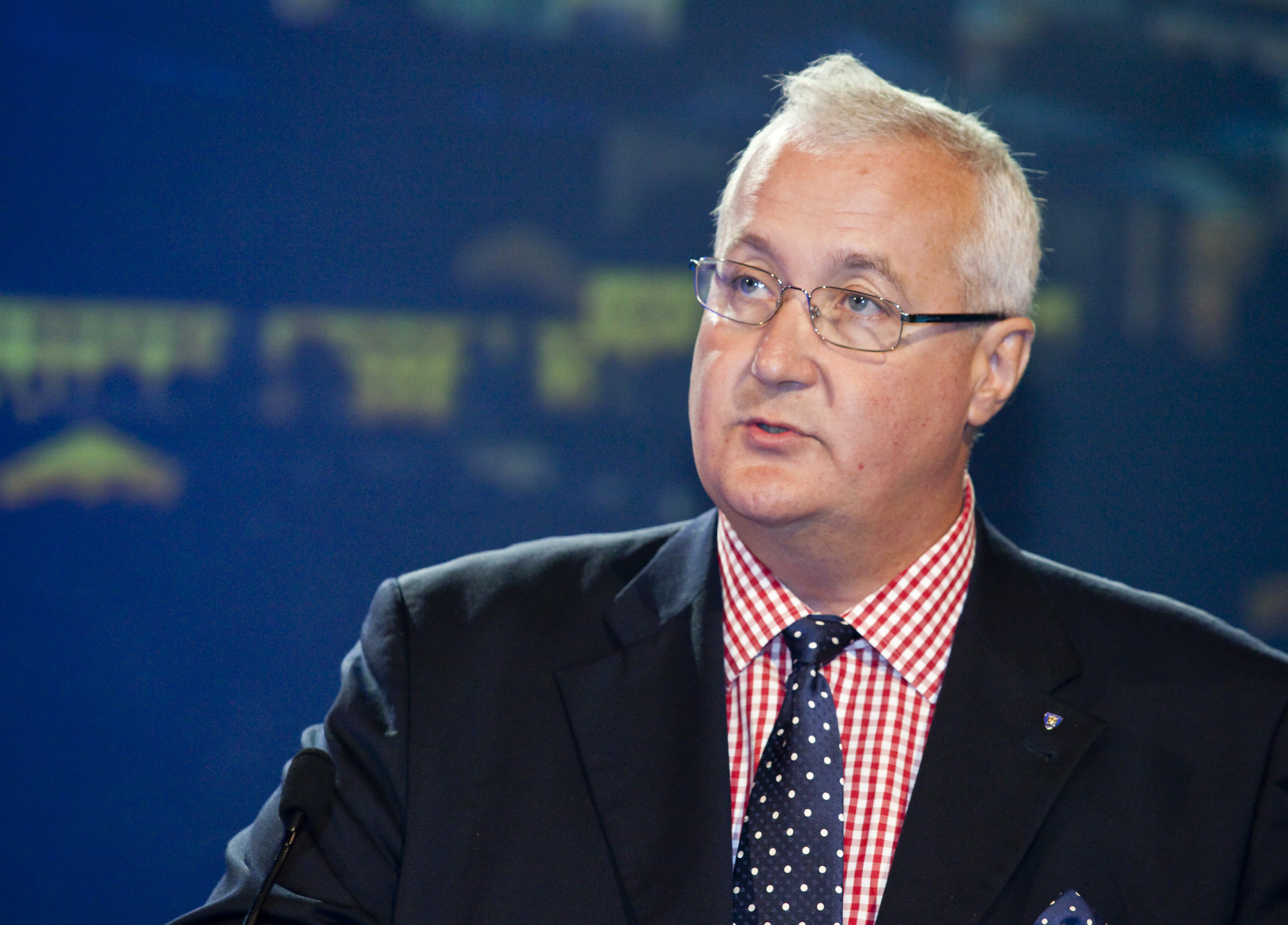

19th Mayor of Stockholm
- In office 28 April 2008 – 20 October 2014
- Preceded by: Kristina Axén Olin
- Succeeded by: Karin Wanngård

38th Governor of Blekinge County
- In office 1 October 2017 – 31 January 2021
- Preceded by: Berit Andnor
- Succeeded by: Ulrica Messing

Personal details
- Born: Sten Roland Nordin; 18 February 1956 (age 70) Tystberga, Södermanland, Sweden
- Party: Moderate
- Spouse: Hanna Hesser Nordin

Sten Nordin (born 18 February 1956) is a Swedish politician of the Moderate Party and the governor of Blekinge County. He served as mayor of Stockholm from 2008 to 2014.

Educated at the University of Uppsala, he was chairman of the Heimdal Association, the Free Moderate Party Student Union.

Nordin was elected as a member of the Stockholm City Council from 1992, and was vice chair of the Moderate group from 1994-2006. Leaving municipal politics, he was a member of the Riksdag from 2006 until 2008. During his time in the Riksdag he was a member of the Transport Committee and Tax Committee.

Returning to city politics, in late April 2008, he was elected mayor of Stockholm. He left the role following the election of 2014.

On 1 October 2017, he was appointed governor of Blekinge County.
