= Mats Svegfors =

Swedish politician (born 1948)

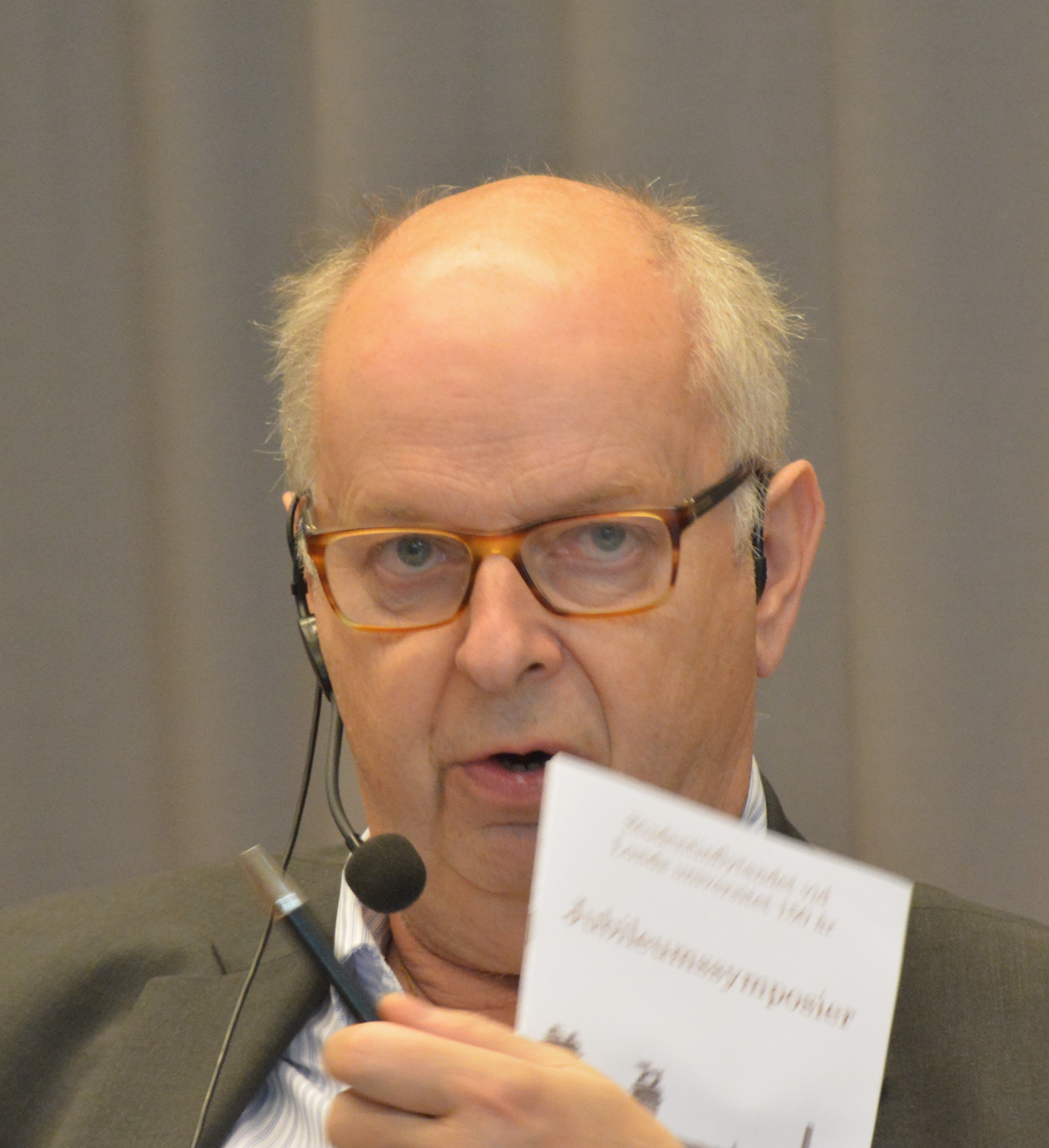
Mats Svegfors

John Mats Arvid Svegfors (born 28 August 1948) is a Swedish journalist and politician. He was the editor-in-chief of Svenska Dagbladet from 1991 to 2000, and governor of Västmanland County from 2000 to 2009.

== See also ==
- List of Västmanland Governors
