= Lars Engqvist =

Swedish politician (born 1945)

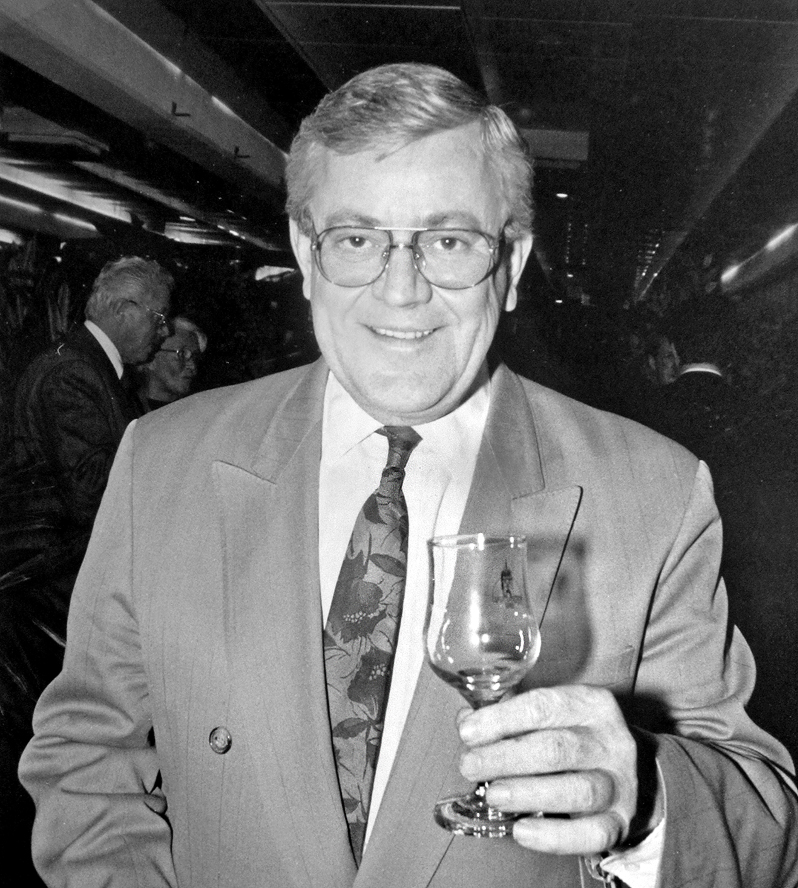
- Engqvist in 1992

Deputy Prime Minister of Sweden
- In office 1 June 2004 – 1 October 2004
- Prime Minister: Göran Persson
- Preceded by: Marita Ulvskog (acting)
- Succeeded by: Laila Freivalds (acting)

Minister of Health and Social Affairs
- In office 16 November 1998 – 1 October 2004
- Prime Minister: Göran Persson
- Preceded by: Maj-Inger Klingvall
- Succeeded by: Berit Andnor

Minister of the Interior
- In office 5 October 1998 – 7 October 1998
- Prime Minister: Göran Persson
- Preceded by: Thomas Östros
- Succeeded by: Lars-Erik Lövdén

Minister for Housing
- In office 5 October 1998 – 7 October 1998
- Prime Minister: Göran Persson
- Preceded by: Position established
- Succeeded by: Lars-Erik Lövdén

Personal details
- Born: 13 August 1945 (age 81), Sweden
- Party: Social Democratic Party
- Spouse: Gullbritt Engqvist

Lars Engqvist (born 13 August 1945) is a Swedish politician. He served as chairman of the youth organization of the Swedish Social Democrats from 1972 to 1978, and then worked as a journalist. He was the editor-in-chief of Arbetet, a Malmö-based newspaper. In the early 1990s, he was the mayor of Malmö, and then president of the Swedish Film Institute before receiving his first government appointment in 1998.

On 1 June 2004, he was appointed deputy Prime Minister of the Swedish government. The appointment was mainly to make him the acting prime minister under Göran Persson, when the latter received knee surgery in early June. The appointment would not affect his status as the Minister of Health and Social Affairs. However, at the same time it was also announced that Engqvist would step down from his government posts on 1 October, to become the new Governor of Jönköping County.

In April 2005, he was appointed chairman of the Swedish public service television company Sveriges Television, succeeding Allan Larsson. The appointment drew criticism because of his close ties to the Social Democratic Party and the government.

== See also ==
- List of Jönköping Governors

Party political offices
| Preceded by Bo Ringholm | Chair of the Social Democratic Youth League; 1972–1978 | Succeeded by Jan Nygren |
Political offices
| Preceded by Nils Yngvesson | Mayor of Malmö; 1990–1992 | Succeeded by Joakim Ollén |
| Preceded by Leif Blomberg | Minister of Integration; 1998 | Succeeded by Ulrica Messing |
| Preceded by Jörgen Andersson | Minister of the Interior; 1998 | Succeeded by Lars-Erik Lövdén |
| Preceded by Maj-Inger Klingvall | Minister for Health and Social Affairs; 1998–2004 | Succeeded by Berit Andnor |
| Preceded by Marita Ulvskog; Acting | Deputy Prime Minister of Sweden; 2004 | Succeeded by Laila Freivalds; Acting |
| Preceded by Birgit Friggebo | Governor of Jönköping County; 2004–2010 | Succeeded by Minoo Akhtarzand |
Media offices
| Preceded by Ingrid Edström | Executive Director of the Swedish Film Institute; 1994–1998 | Succeeded by Hans Ottoson |
| Preceded by Allan Larsson | Chair of the Sveriges Television; 2005–2011 | Succeeded by Göran Johnsson |
