= List of governors of Blekinge County =

Governor of Blekinge County
- Landshövding i Blekinge län
- Coat of arms of Blekinge County.
- Incumbent; Ulrica Messing since 1 October 2021
- Blekinge County Administrative Board
- Residence: The residence in Karlskrona, Karlskrona
- Appointer: Government of Sweden
- Term length: Six years (Note: The governor is often appointed for a six-year mandate. It can be extended if the person has not reached retirement age.)
- Precursor: Governor of Kalmar County; Governor of Kristianstad County; Governor-General of Scania
- Formation: 1683
- First holder: Erik Siöblad
- Deputy: County Director (Länsrådet)
- Salary: SEK 97,800/month (2017)
- Website: Governor website

This is a list of governors for Blekinge County in Sweden, from 1683 to the present. For the period 1658–1669 and 1675–1680, see Governors-General, Scania. Between 1670 and 1675, Blekinge was included in Kristianstad County and between 1680 and 1683, the province was included in Kalmar County. For the period 1680–1683, see List of governors of Kalmar County.

- Erik Siöblad (1683–1700)
- Berndt Didrik Mörner (1700–1706)
- Jöran Adlersteen (1706–1713)
- Salomon von Otter (1713–1714)
- Clas Bonde (1714–1719)
- Salomon von Otter (1719–1729)
- Johan Palmfelt (1729–1733)
- Carl Georg Siöblad (1733–1740)
- Wilhelm Ludvig Taube (1741–1746)
- Axel Lagerbielke (1747; acting)
- Lars Dalman (1747–1752)
- Carl Harald Strömfelt (1752–1769)
- Johan von Rajalin (1769–1783)
- Salomon von Köhler (1783–1789)
- Claes Jakob Raab (1789–1800)
- Anders af Håkansson (1800–1812)
- Nils Adolph Humble (1812–1813)
- Gustaf Anton af Brinkman (1813–1822)
- Hans Wachtmeister (1823–1827)
- Carl Henrik Gyllenhaal (1828–1831)
- Johan Otto Nauckhoff (1832–1847)
  - Arwid Adolf Palander (acting 1847–1848)
- Arvid Gustaf Faxe (1848–1856)
- Enar Wilhelm Nordenfelt (1856–1867)
- Hans Wachtmeister (1867–1883)
- Rudolf Horn (1883–1892)
- Gotthard Wachtmeister (1892–1900)
- Axel Hansson Wachtmeister (1900–1923)
- Sven Hagströmer (1923–1942)
- Erik Lindeberg (1942–1947)
- Bertil Fallenius (1948–1956)
- Erik von Heland (1956–1961)
- Thure Andersson (1961–1973)
- Camilla Odhnoff (1974–1992)
- Ulf Lönnqvist (1992–2001)
- Ingegerd Wärnersson (2002–2008)
- Gunvor Engström (2008–2011)
- Berit Andnor (2011–2017)
- Sten Nordin (2017–2021)
- Helena Morgonsköld (acting; 2021–2021)
- Ulrica Messing (2021–present)
