= Håkan Sörman =

Swedish civil servant

Governor of Jönköping County
- In office 1 October 2016 – 30 September 2017
- Monarch: Carl XVI Gustaf
- Prime Minister: Stefan Löfven
- Preceded by: Minoo Akhtarzand
- Succeeded by: Helena Jonsson

Personal details
- Born: 17 February 1952 (age 74) Stockholm, Sweden
- Spouse: Marie-Louise Sörman
- Education: Stockholm School of Economics

Claes Håkan Sörman (born 17 February 1952) is a Swedish civil servant who served as Governor of Jönköping County from 1 October 2016 to 30 September 2017. He previously was CEO of the Swedish Association of Local Authorities and Regions from 2004 to 2016 and before that as chief director of Södertälje Municipality from 1991 to 2003.

Civic offices
| Preceded by First holder | Managing Director of the Swedish Association of Local; Authorities and Regions; 2004–2016 | Succeeded by Vesna Jovic |
| Preceded by Minoo Akhtarzand | Governor of Jönköping County; 2016–2017 | Succeeded by Helena Jonsson |
