= List of governors of Västmanland County =

Governor of Västmanland County
- Landshövding i Västmanlands län
- Coat of arms of Västmanland County.
- Incumbent; Acko Ankarberg Johansson since 10 November 2025
- Västmanland County Administrative Board
- Residence: Västerås Castle, Västerås
- Appointer: Government of Sweden
- Term length: Six years (Note: The governor is often appointed for a six-year mandate. It can be extended if the person has not reached retirement age.)
- Formation: 1634
- First holder: Ture Eriksson Sparre
- Deputy: County Director (Länsrådet)
- Salary: SEK 97,800/month (2017)
- Website: Governor and County Director

This is a list of governors for Västmanland County of Sweden, from 1634 to present.

- Ture Eriksson Sparre (1634–1639)
- Gustaf Gabrielsson Oxenstierna (1639–1642)
- Christer Posse (1642–1643)
- Claes Stiernsköld (1643–1651)
- Knut Kurck (1651–1660)
- Gustaf Larsson Sparre (1660–1667)
- Ernst Johan Creutz d.ä. (1667–1674)
- Mauritz Nilsson Posse (1674–1683)
- Balthasar Gyldenhoff (1683–1689)
- Lars Wallenstedt (1689–1693)
- Polycarpus Cronhielm (1693–1698)
- Gustaf Cronhielm (1698–1710)
- Ludvig Fahlström (1710–1714)
- Casten Feif (1714–1715)
- Jonas Cedercreutz (1716–1720)
- Gustaf Funck (1720–1736)
- Johan Cederbielke (1736–1747)
- Fredric von Friesendorff (1747–1761)
- Gabriel Falkenberg (1761–1763)
- Fredric Ulric Insenstierna (1763–1768)
- Olof Malmerfelt (1769–1771)
- Carl Carlsköld (1772–1784)
- Ulric Gustaf de la Gardie (1784–1809)
- Fredric Lilliehorn (1809–1811)
- Johan Wilhelm Liljencrants (1811–1816)
- Thure Drufva (1816–1822)
- Fredric Ridderstolpe (1822–1849)
- Fredrik Otto Silfverstolpe (1849–1863)
- Fredrik Cronstedt (1863–1869)
- Reinhold Charpentier (1869–1883)
- Fredrik Hederstierna (1883–1900)
- Claës Wersäll (1900–1916)
- Walter Murray (1916–1937)
- August Bernhard Gärde (1937–1943)
- Conrad Jonsson (1943–1952)
- Ragnar Casparsson (1952–1960)
- Gustav Cederwall (1960–1980)
- Osborne Bartley (1980–1985)
- Karl-Lennart Uggla (1985–1989)
- Carl Johan Åberg (1989–1990)
- Jan Rydh (1991–1999)
- Mats Svegfors (2000–2009)
- Ingemar Skogö (2009–2015)
- Håkan Wåhlstedt (2015–2016)
- Minoo Akhtarzand (2016–30 November 2021)
- Ulrica Gradin (acting: 1 December 2021 – 31 October 2022)
- Johan Sterte (1 November 2022 – 10 November 2025)
- Acko Ankarberg Johansson (10 November 2025 -)
