= Bo Huldt =

Swedish historian (1941-2015)

Bo Huldt (24 April 1941 – 26 May 2015), was a Swedish historian and expert in foreign policy. He was director of the International Institute for Strategic Studies from 1992 to 1993. During the years 1994–2001 he was employed at the National Defence University, where in 1996 he was made professor in security and strategy. For 1997 to 1998 he was at the National Defence College and director of the Institute for Higher National Defence Education.
