= Eva Eriksson (politician) =

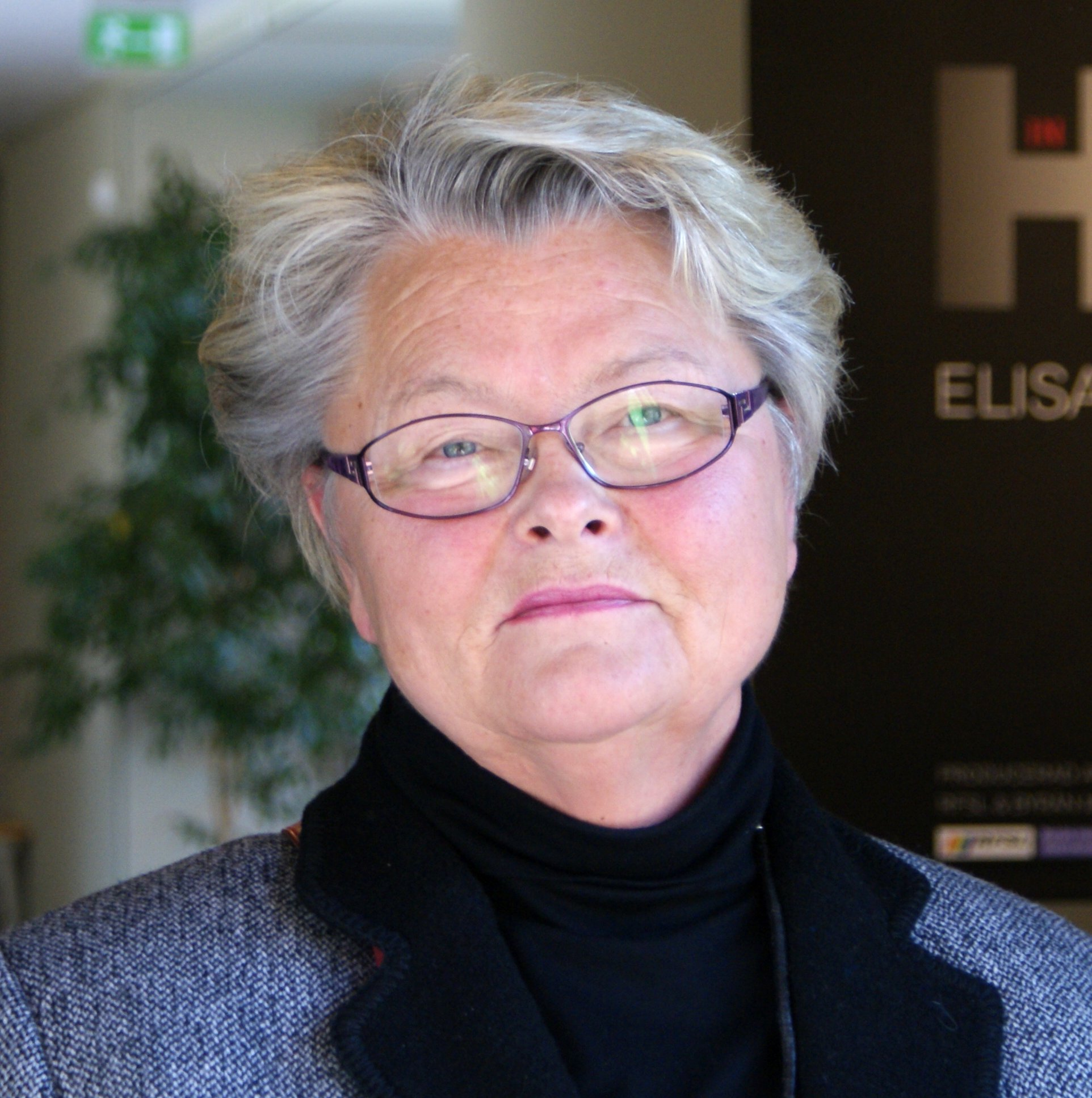
Eva Eriksson, politician in Sweden.

Eva Eriksson, born 1947 in Vara, was Värmland’s county governor in Sweden from 2004-2012.

== Career ==
Eva Eriksson has been active in politics in Sweden since the early 1990s. Since 2004, along with being Värmland’s county governor, she has been the Chair of the Swedish American Center board. She was also the vice-chair on the Karlstad University Board of Regents. From 1992-2001, Eriksson served as Vice Party Chair Folkpartiet and she served in Parliament from 1994-1999. Her focus during her career has been on welfare, pharmaceuticals, animal protection and the environment. She helped to found the Svenskamerikanska Rådet (The Swedish American Council) and is the appointed Chair of the organization and its board.

== Awards ==
Eriksson received the SCA Great Achievement award for her work in establishing and furthering the connection between Sweden and North America.
