= Gunvor Engström =

- In office 2008–2011
- Appointed by: Cabinet of Fredrik Reinfeldt
- Preceded by: Ingegerd Wärnersson

Personal details
- Born: December 29, 1950 (age 75) Betul, Madhya Pradesh
- Education: Stockholm School of Economics
- Profession: Civil servant
- Website: http://www.lansstyrelsen.se/blekinge

Gunvor Engström, born December 29, 1950, in Betul, India, is Swedish business personality and civil servant. She led Företagarna, a Swedish association of primarily small- and medium-sized businesses and employers, between June 2002 and December 2006. She was appointed County Governor of Blekinge County from 1 September 2008 by the Swedish government, for a period of six years, but resigned in 2011.

Engström has a varied background with experience of private and public companies.

She worked for nine years in the Swedish Government offices.
