= Anders Danielsson =

Swedish government official

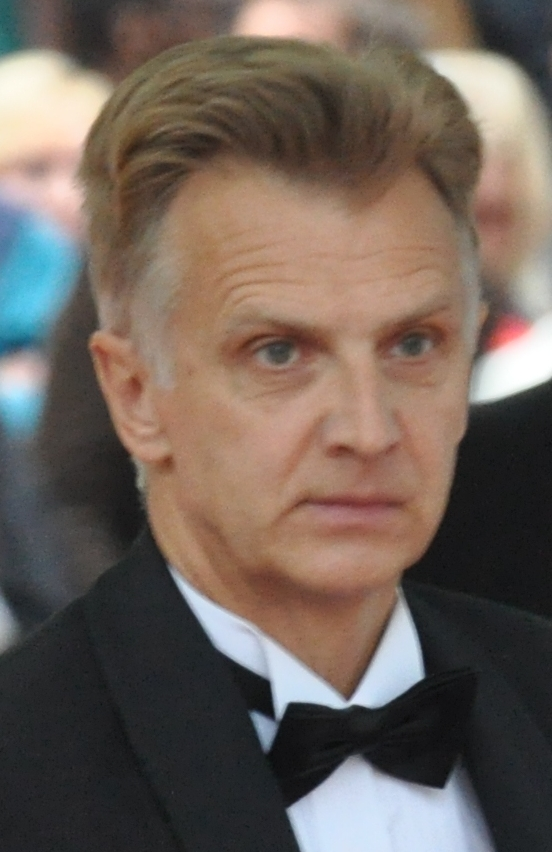
- Anders Danielsson in 2010

Governor of Västra Götaland
- In office 18 September 2017 – 30 November 2021
- Appointed by: Stefan Löfven
- Deputy: Lisbeth Schultze
- Preceded by: Lars Bäckström
- Succeeded by: Sten Tolgfors

Personal details
- Born: 27 December 1953 Hököpinge, Sweden
- Party: Independent

Sven Anders Herman Danielsson (born 27 December 1953) is a Swedish government official who served as Director-General and Head of the Swedish Security Service from 2007 to 2012 and as Director-General of the Swedish Migration Board from 2012 to 2016. He served as Governor of Västra Götaland County from 2017 to 2021.

Anders Danielsson lives in Stockholm and Skåne. He is married and has two children.

Civic offices
Preceded by Klas Bergenstrand	Director-General and Head of the Swedish Security Service; 2007–2012	Succeeded by Anders Thornberg
Preceded by Dan Eliasson	Director-General of the Swedish Migration Board; 2012–2016	Succeeded by Mikael Ribbenvik
Preceded by Ulrika Årehed Kågström	Secretary General of the Swedish Red Cross; 2016–2017	Succeeded by Martin Ärnlöv
Government offices
Preceded by Lars Bäckström	Governor of Västra Götaland County; 2017–2021	Succeeded by Sten Tolgfors
