= County administrative boards of Sweden =

A county administrative board (Swedish: länsstyrelse) is a Swedish Government Agency in each of the counties of Sweden, led by a governor (Swedish: landshövding) appointed by the government for a term of six years. The lists of gubernatorial officeholders, in most cases, stretches back to 1634 when the counties were created by Chancellor Axel Oxenstierna.

The responsibilities of the county administrative boards are governed by the County Administrative Board Ordinance (2017:868). The boards implement national objectives while taking regional conditions into account and coordinate the activities of government agencies and other stakeholders within their respective counties. Their statutory responsibilities include elections, animal welfare and food control, regional development, infrastructure and spatial planning, environmental protection, and emergency preparedness and civil defence. Six county administrative boards also have additional responsibilities for coordinating civil defence across larger geographical areas. In each county there is also a County Council which is a policy-making assembly elected by the residents of the county.

The county administrative boards are national government authorities, distinct from the democratically elected regional authorities (regioner), which exercise regional self-government. On Gotland, the municipality performs the functions assigned to regional authorities elsewhere in Sweden.

The capital of a county is in Swedish called residensstad ("residence city") because it is the seat of residence of the governor.

	County	County administrative board	Capital	Governor
1.	Blekinge	Blekinge Board	Karlskrona	Ulrica Messing (list)
2.	Dalarna	Dalarna Board	Falun	Helena Höij (list)
3.	Gotland	Gotland Board	Visby	Charlotte Petri Gornitzka (list)
4.	Gävleborg	Gävleborg Board	Gävle	Carina Ståhl Herrstedt (list)
5.	Halland	Halland Board	Halmstad	Anders Thornberg (list)
6.	Jämtland	Jämtland Board	Östersund	Marita Ljung (list)
7.	Jönköping	Jönköping Board	Jönköping	Brittis Benzler (list)
8.	Kalmar	Kalmar Board	Kalmar	Allan Widman (list)
9.	Kronoberg	Kronoberg Board	Växjö	Maria Arnholm (list)
10.	Norrbotten	Norrbotten Board	Luleå	Lotta Finstorp (list)
11.	Skåne	Skåne Board	Malmö	Peter Danielsson (list)
12.	Stockholm	Stockholm Board	Stockholm	Cecilia Skingsley (list)
13.	Södermanland	Södermanland Board	Nyköping	Johanna Sandwall (acting) (list)
14.	Uppsala	Uppsala Board	Uppsala	Stefan Attefall (list)
15.	Värmland	Värmland Board	Karlstad	Georg Andrén (list)
16.	Västerbotten	Västerbotten Board	Umeå	Helene Hellmark Knutsson (list)
17.	Västernorrland	Västernorrland Board	Härnösand	Carin Jämtin (list)
18.	Västmanland	Västmanland Board	Västerås	Acko Ankarberg Johansson (list)
19.	Västra Götaland	Västra Götaland Board	Gothenburg	Sten Tolgfors (list)
20.	Örebro	Örebro Board	Örebro	Lena Rådström Baastad (list)
21.	Östergötland	Östergötland Board	Linköping	Gunilla Svantorp (list)

== Leadership and appointments ==
Each county administrative board is a government agency led by a single executive, the county governor (landshövding), rather than a governing board of appointed members. The governor is appointed by the Swedish government.

Each agency has a statutory deputy governor, titled länsöverdirektör in Stockholm, Skåne and Västra Götaland counties and länsråd in the remaining counties. The deputy is appointed by the government following a submission from the governor. Other employees are hired by the agency itself.

Every county administrative board also has an oversight council (insynsråd) of no more than eight members, chaired by the governor. The government appoints its members for a specified term. The council provides oversight and advice to the governor but does not exercise the agency's executive authority.

The ordinances also require each agency to have a personnel responsibility committee and a wildlife management delegation. Certain counties have additional specialized decision-making bodies.

== See also ==
- Governor of Stockholm
- List of Swedish Governors-General
- Provincial Governors of Finland
- Regional Board
