= Tolgfors (surname) =

Tolgfors is a surname. Notable people with the surname include:

- Katarina Tolgfors (born 1967), Swedish politician
- Sten Tolgfors (born 1966), Swedish politician

== See also ==
- Torres (surname)
- Tolors
