= List of governors of Västra Götaland County =

Governor of Västra Götaland County
- Landshövding i Västra Götalands län
- Coat of arms of Västra Götaland County.

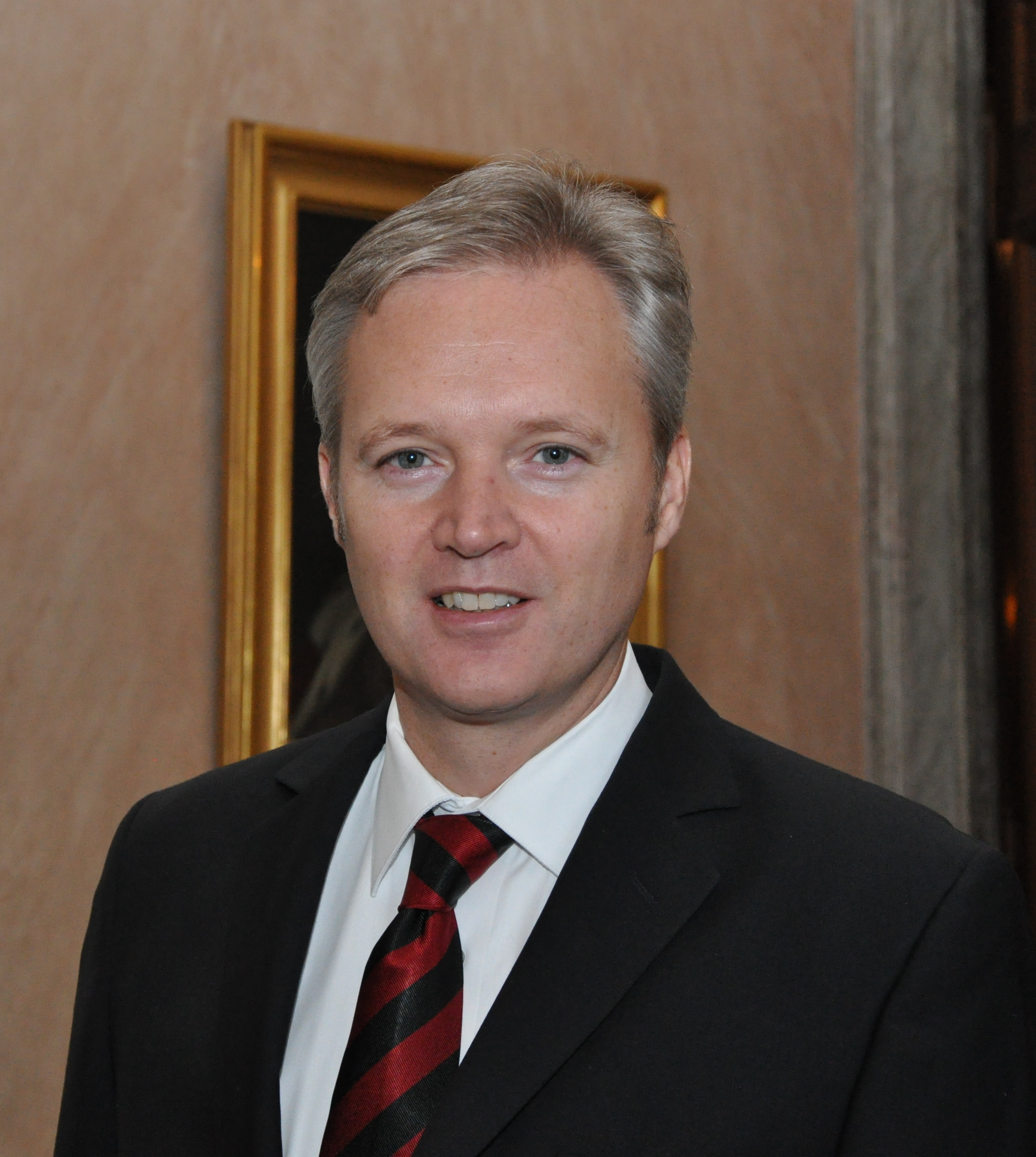
- Incumbent; Sten Tolgfors since 1 September 2022
- Västra Götaland County Administrative Board
- Residence: The residence in Gothenburg, Gothenburg
- Appointer: Government of Sweden
- Term length: Six years (Note: The governor is often appointed for a six-year mandate. It can be extended if the person has not reached retirement age.), with possibility to extension by maximum three years
- Precursor: Governor of Gothenburg and Bohus County; Governor of Skaraborg County; Governor of Älvsborg County
- Formation: 1 January 1998
- First holder: Göte Bernhardsson
- Deputy: Deputy County Governor (Länsöverdirektören)
- Salary: SEK 102,800/month (2017)
- Website: Governor and Deputy County Governor

The office of Governor of Västra Götaland County was created in 1998, where the counties Älvsborg County, Gothenburg and Bohus County and Skaraborg County merged.

== List of officeholders ==
No.	Portrait	Governor (Born–Died)	Tenure			Political party	Served for Cabinet
No.	Portrait	Governor (Born–Died)	Took office	Left office	Duration	Political party	Served for Cabinet
1	Göte Bernhardsson	Göte Bernhardsson (1942–2019)	1 January 1998	28 December 2007	9 years, 361 days	Social Democrats	Persson (1998 – 2006); Reinfeldt (2006 – 2007)
2	Lars Bäckström	Lars Bäckström (born 1953)	21 January 2008	20 January 2017	8 years, 365 days	Left	Reinfeldt (2008 – 2014); Löfven I (2014 – 2017)
–	Lisbeth Schultze	Lisbeth Schultze (born 1960); Acting	20 January 2017	18 September 2017	241 days	Independent	Löfven I
3	Anders Danielsson	Anders Danielsson (born 1953)	18 September 2017	30 November 2021	4 years, 73 days	Independent	Löfven I (2017 – 2019); Löfven II (2019 – 2021)
–	Lisbeth Schultze	Lisbeth Schultze (born 1960); Acting	1 December 2021	31 August 2022)	273 days	Independent	Löfven III (2021 – 2021); Andersson (2021 – 2022)
4	Sten Tolgfors	Sten Tolgfors (born 1966)	1 September 2022	Incumbent	4 years, 30 days	Moderate	Andersson (2022 – 2022); Kristersson (since 2022)
