= Yngve Holmberg =

Swedish politician (1925–2011)

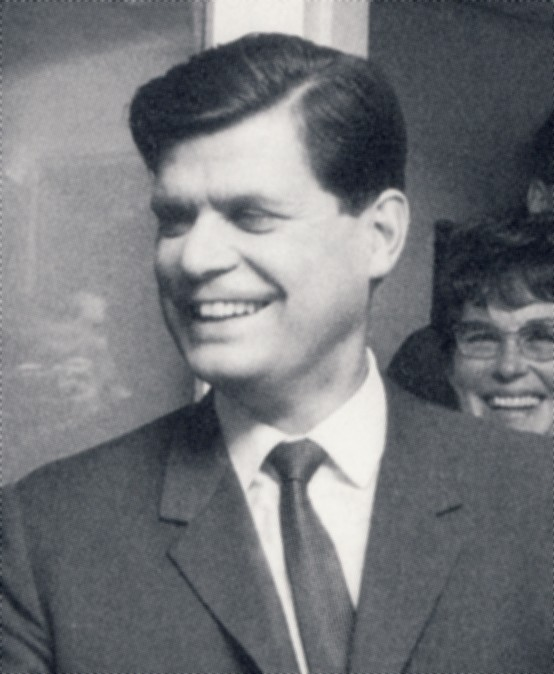

Consul General of Sweden at Houston
- In office 3 March 1978 – 1 August 1981
- Preceded by: Bengt Rösiö (Note: The post of Consul General was vacant after Bengt Rösiö left the position in 1971, until Holmberg took it up in 1978.)
- Succeeded by: None (Note: The Consulate General of Sweden, Houston closed when Holmberg left the post.)

Governor of Halland County
- In office 1972–1977
- Monarchs: Gustaf VI Adolf (1972–1973); Carl XVI Gustaf (1973–1977)
- Preceded by: Ingvar Lindell
- Succeeded by: Carl Persson

Leader of the Moderate Party
- In office 1965–1970
- Monarch: Gustaf VI Adolf
- Preceded by: Gunnar Heckscher
- Succeeded by: Gösta Bohman

Personal details
- Born: 21 March 1925 Stockholm, Sweden
- Died: 29 October 2011 (aged 86) Norrtälje, Sweden
- Resting place: Galärvarvskyrkogården
- Party: Moderate Party
- Spouse: Inga Henriksson (m. 1952–1972)
- Children: 2
- Education: Stockholm University College

Yngve Holmberg (21 March 1925 – 29 October 2011) was a Swedish politician in the Moderate Party, who was its leader from 1965 to 1970.

== Early life ==
Holmberg was born on 21 March 1925 in Bromma Parish, City of Stockholm, Sweden, the son of Nils Holmberg, an editor, and his wife Ingeborg (née Johansson). He passed studentexamen in 1945 and received a Candidate of Law degree from Stockholm University College in 1951.

== Career ==
Holmberg carried out court service in Western Medelpad judicial district (Medelpads västra domsaga) from 1951 to 1953 and was secretary in the Right Party's parliamentary group from 1953 to 1955. He was the secretary in the office of the Right Party in the Riksdag from 1954 to 1955. Holmberg served as Secretary of the City Council (Borgarrådssekreterare) and secretary in the Stockholm City's Legal and Police Directorate (Stockholms stads rätts- och polisdirektion) from 1955 to 1959. He was Chief Executive Officer of the Building Committee of Private Commerce and Industry of Sweden (Näringslivets byggnadsdelegation) and chief secretary of its Housing Investigation from 1959 to 1961. Holmberg became the party secretary for the National Organization of the Right Party in 1961 and was the chairman of the Right Party/Moderate Party between 1965 and 1971. During Holmberg's time as leader, his party saw declining support in face of a left-wing wave in the late 1960s. Following a very poor result for the Moderate Party in the 1970 general election, Holmberg's position was challenged by the party's vice chairman Gösta Bohman, who won the vote at the party congress.

After his political career, Holmberg served as director of the Federation of Swedish Industries (Sveriges Industriförbund) from 1970 to 1971 and county governor of Halland County from 1972 to 1977. He served as the Consul General and head of the Swedish Consulate General in Houston from 1978 to 1981, and as Consul General in reserve from 1982 to 1990. Holmberg was a self-employed consultant at Scandinavian Business Consulting from 1982.

Holmberg was a member and expert in several government inquiries. He was the first vice chairman of the Stockholm Right Federation (Stockholmshögerns förbund) from 1961 to 1963, a member of parliament from 1962 to 1972, a member of the Board of Governors of the Sveriges Riksbank (Riksbanksfullmäktige) from 1964 to 1970. He was a member of the Nordic Council from 1966. He became a board member of the Skandia Group in 1970.

== Personal life ==
From 1952 to 1972, Holmberg was married to Inga Henriksson (born 1919), the daughter of the farmer Gustaf Henriksson and Ottilia Hultquist. They had two daughters: Ann-Marie and Marit.

== Death ==
Holmberg died 29 October 2011 in Gräddö, Stockholm County. The funeral service was held in Rådmansö Church in Norrtälje Municipality on 9 November 2011. He was interred on 23 May 2012 at Galärvarvskyrkogården in Stockholm.

== Awards and decorations ==
- (Sweden) Commander 1st Class of the Order of the Polar Star (3 December 1974)

== Footnotes ==
Party political offices
Preceded by Gunnar Heckscher	Leader of the Swedish Moderate Party; 1965–1970	Succeeded by Gösta Bohman
Civic offices
Preceded by Ingvar Lindell	Governor of Halland County; 1972–1977	Succeeded by Carl Persson
Diplomatic posts
Preceded by Bengt Rösiö	Consul-general of Sweden to Houston; 1978–1981	Succeeded by None
