= Daniel Öhman =

Swedish investigative journalist

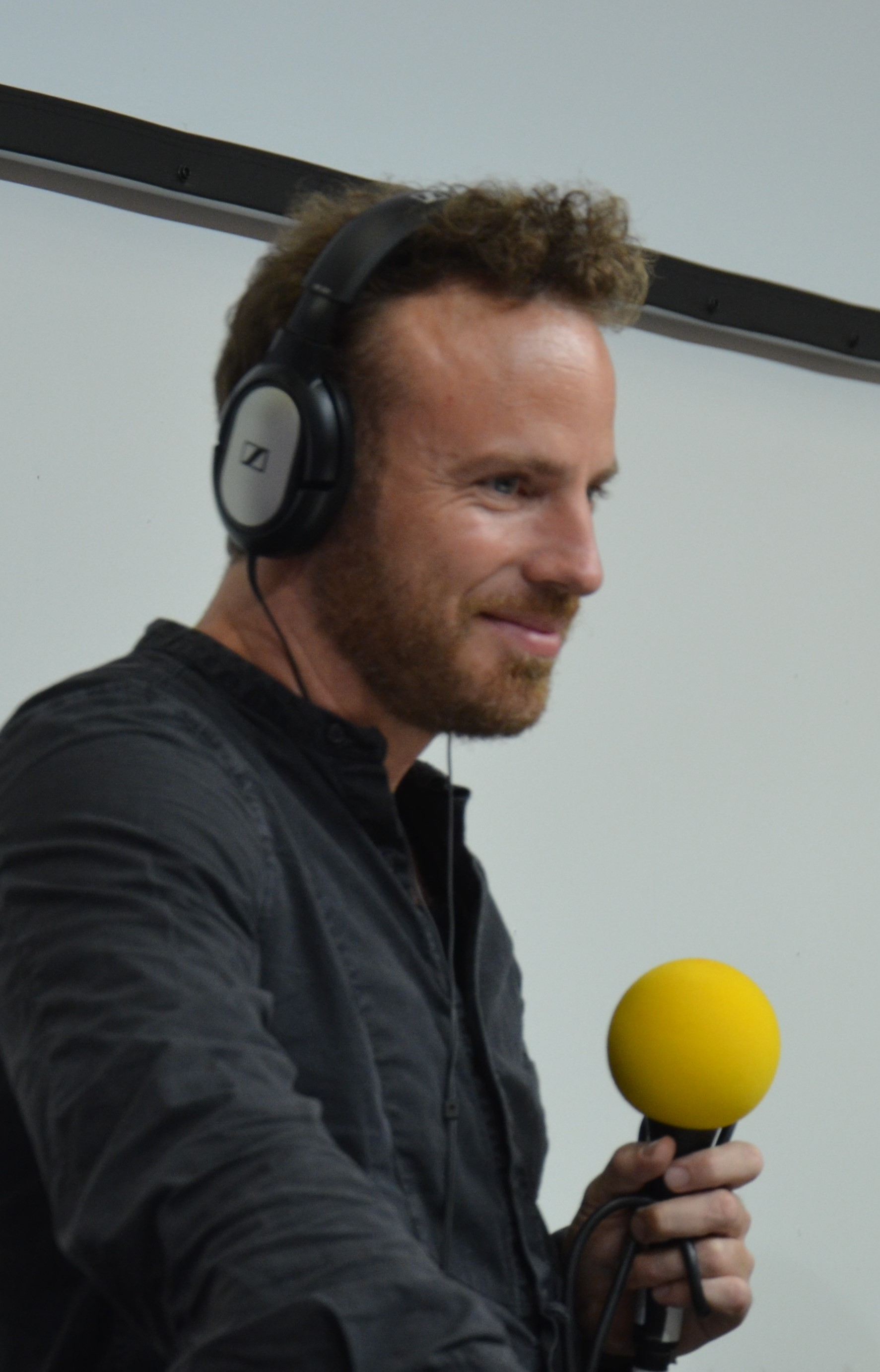
Daniel Ohman

Daniel Öhman, born 20 May 1973, is a Swedish investigative journalist with the Swedish Radio. He has been a member of the investigative team since 2004 and has won several national and international awards.

With his colleague Bo-Göran Bodin, Daniel Öhman 2012 revealed how a Swedish Government agency helped Saudi Arabia to plan a weapons factory. To conceal the cooperation from the public a dummy corporation was set up with the help of the Military Secret service. Project Simoom, as the investigation was called, led to the resignation of Defence minister Sten Tolgfors and the cancellation of the military cooperation with Saudi Arabia. The investigation won several national and international awards including, Prix Europa for Best European Radio Investigation and the American investigative reporters and editors (IRE) finest award "IRE medal". It was later turned into a book "Saudivapen" The movie rights are sold to Götafilm.

In 2014 Daniel Öhman again in cooperation with Bo-Göran Bodin was awarded The Prix Europa for their documentary "The Insider", which revealed that the Ericsson corporation had used bribery to secure a defense contract in Greece. Before that Daniel Öhman worked on a three year long investigation of the food industry and the environment called "The price of food" (Matens Pris). The investigation received several awards and was later turned into a book: "Matens Pris".
