= List of governors of Halland County =

Governor of Halland County
- Landshövding i Hallands län
- Coat of arms of Halland County.
- Incumbent; Anders Thornberg since 1 December 2023
- Halland County Administrative Board
- Residence: Halmstad Castle, Halmstad
- Appointer: Government of Sweden
- Term length: Six years (Note: The governor is often appointed for a six-year mandate. It can be extended if the person has not reached retirement age.)
- Formation: 1658
- First holder: Bengt Christoffersson Lilliehöök
- Deputy: County Director (Länsrådet)
- Salary: SEK 97,800/month (2017)
- Website: Governor Lena Sommestad

This is a list of governors for Halland County of Sweden, from 1658 to present.

1. Bengt Christoffersson Lilliehöök (1658–1665)
2. Johan Hård af Segerstad (1665–1676)
3. Göran Sperling (1676–1678)
4. Sven Ranck (1678–1684)
5. Gustaf Tungel (1684–1694)
6. Hans von Dellingshausen (1698–1705)
7. Reinhold Johan von Fersen (1695–1710)
8. Axel von Faltzburg (1710–1728)
9. Wilhelm Bennet (1728–1737)
10. Claes Rålamb (1737–1745)
11. Carl Mårten Fleetwood (1745–1750)
12. Nils Bonde (1750)
13. Hans Hummelhielm (1750–1761)
14. Arvid Silfvershiöld (1761–1771)
15. Olof von Nackreij (1771–1776)
16. Salomon von Otter (1776–1781)
17. Georg Gustaf Wrangel (1781–1793)
18. Axel Eric Gyllenstierna (1793–1810)
19. Gustaf Wilhelm Conradi (1810–1812)
20. Josua Sylvander (1812–1818)
21. Lars Arnell (1818–1823)
22. Claes Virgin (1824–1844)
23. Patrick Adolph Lewenhaupt (1844–1860)
24. Carl Jonas Oscar Alströmer (1860–1876)
25. F W Leijonancker (1876–1883)
26. Carl Nordenfalk (1883–1902)
27. Axel Asker (1902–1916)
28. Carl Fredrik Hederstierna (1916–1920)
29. Axel Mörner (1920–1935)
30. Hilding Kjellman (1935–1943)
31. Reimer Johansson (1943–1959)
32. Ingvar Lindell (1959–1971)
33. Yngve Holmberg (1972–1977)
34. Carl Persson (1978–1979)
35. Johannes Antonsson (1979–1986)
36. Björn Molin (1986–1997)
37. Karin Starrin (1997–2004)
38. Lars-Erik Lövdén (2005–2014)
39. Lena Sommestad (2014–2020)
40. Jörgen Peters (acting; 2020–2020)
41. Brittis Benzler (2020–2023)
42. Anders Thornberg (2023-present)
