= List of riots in Sweden =

This is a chronological list of known riots in Sweden.

== Pre-2000s ==
- Ebel riot
- Rabulist riots
- March Unrest
- Easter Riots
- Båstad riots
- Hotline riot
- Stockholm riots (1623)

== 2000s ==
- 2008 Malmö mosque riots
- 2009 Malmö anti-Israel riots

== 2010s ==
- 2010 Rinkeby riots
- May 2013 Stockholm riots
- December 2013 Stockholm riots
- 2016 riots in Sweden
- 2017 Rinkeby riots

== 2020s ==
- 2020 Sweden riots
- 2022 Sweden riots
