= 2022 Sweden riots =

April 2022 riots in Sweden

- Date: 15–17 April 2022 (3 days)
- Location: Sweden
- Result: Charges brought against both rioters and Rasmus Paludan

Parties
Swedish Police Authority	Rioters

Casualties and losses
Nearly 400 injured; Several police cars damaged or destroyed	3+ injured
- 14 members of the public injured; More than 20 vehicles damaged or destroyed; 47 people sentenced in court of law

Riots occurred in several Swedish cities in April 2022, primarily against police who were stationed to protect events planned by Danish-Swedish politician Rasmus Paludan. The motivation for the violence was ostensibly Paludan's plan to burn a Quran; however, the police suspect that the event was used by criminal groups to target police. Two-thirds of those injured were police officers.

== Background ==
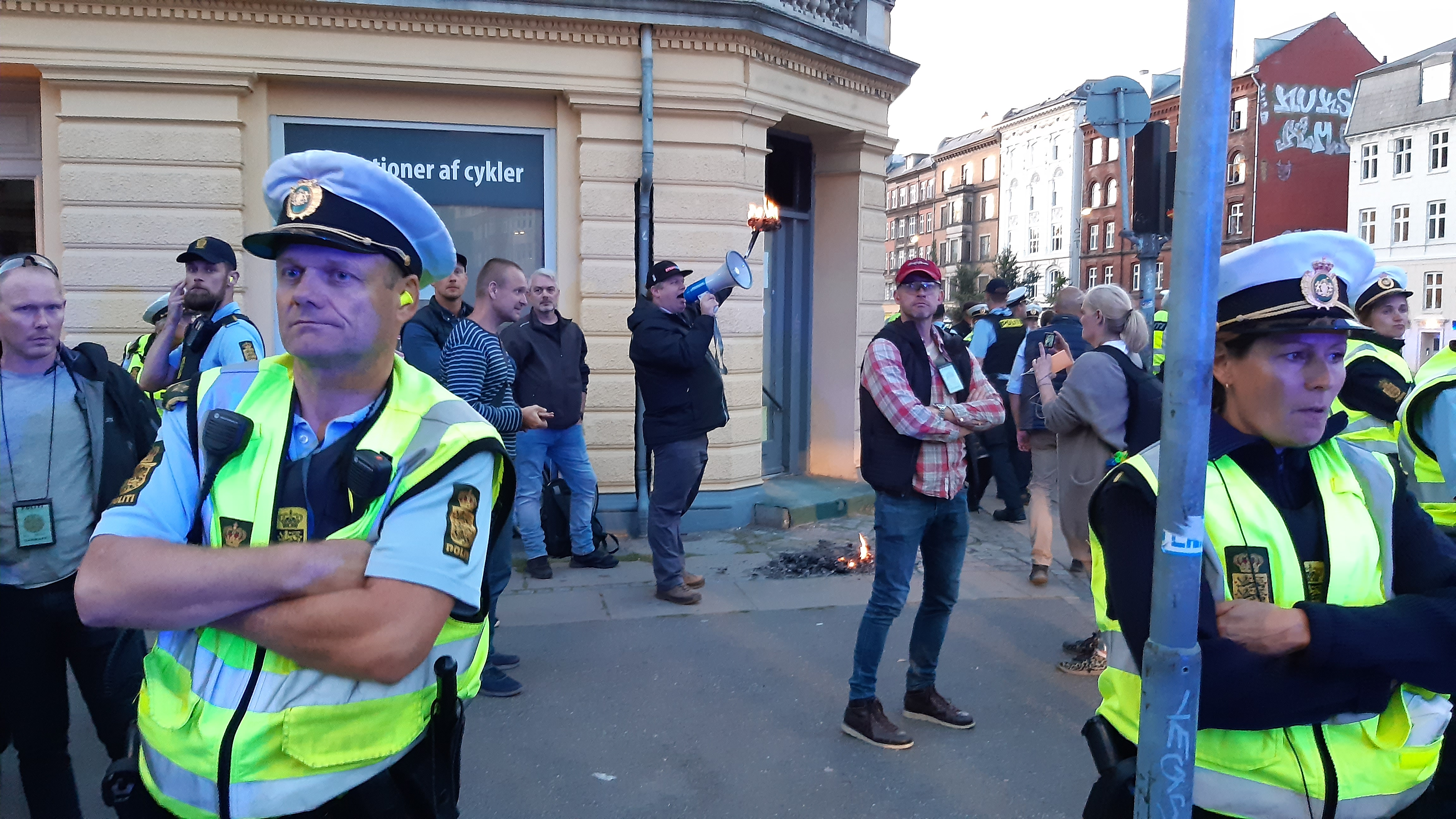
Rasmus Paludan burning a Quran at a rally in Nørrebro, Copenhagen, in 2019 under heavy police protection

Rasmus Paludan is a Danish-Swedish politician and head of the Hard Line (Danish: Stram Kurs) party, who has been known for staging similarly provocative events in the past. His views have been characterised as anti-Islamic, and he has called for the deportation of Muslims from Western society. He has previously been convicted for hate speech and defamation in Denmark and was previously banned from entering Sweden for his role in inciting the 2020 Sweden riots. However, after receiving Swedish citizenship through his father, he could not be banned from entering the country which allowed him to continue his activities in Sweden.

According to a 2017 Pew Research estimate, Sweden is home to about 800,000 Muslims, primarily from immigration. Sweden's immigration policy has been criticised for failing to integrate immigrants, and there has been conflict between Muslims and the country's police force. Some Muslims felt outraged by the Quran burnings and associated rallies.

According to Paludan, the purpose of the Quran burnings was to protest the Swedish government's inability to integrate immigrants into Swedish society and defend freedom of expression.

== Timeline ==
In April 2022, Paludan applied for permission for several rallies in Sweden which involved Quran burning. Regional police permitted some rallies and banned or moved others, depending on local circumstances.

On 14 April, crowds rioted in the city of Linköping, attacking police vehicles and burning a car. Twelve police officers were injured and four of their cars set on fire by angry mobs in Örebro. Social media posts showed men breaking the windows of police cars as they screamed the Takbir. Paludan successfully burned a Quran the next day in Rinkeby, causing more riots.

An attempt to hold a gathering in Malmö on 16 April by Paludan was interrupted after people threw stones. Paludan was hit by a rock and the attackers were driven off with pepper spray. Rioters also torched a bus in the city overnight.

A ceremony to burn the Quran was set to take place in Landskrona, Scania, on 17 April, but was moved to Malmö by the police to prevent unrest. However, rioters in Landskrona stoned and set fire to vehicles, causing extensive property damage and intentionally obstructing traffic. Police fired at them with ricochets in response, injuring three. By the time the day had ended, widespread damage against both police and civilian property had occurred, including one school in Rosengård, Malmö, that had been set on fire.

More than 200 people were involved in the violence and more than 40 people were arrested. At least 104 police officers and 14 members of the public were injured and more than 20 vehicles were damaged or destroyed. At least one uninvolved civilian was also injured.

== Aftermath ==
Paludan stated that the Swedish authorities in the region "showed that they are absolutely incapable of safeguarding themselves and me." He then announced his intention to hold protests the following week. The Swedish police stated that they would reconsider granting Paludan permission to hold further such rallies. On 21 April, the Malmö Police announced that they would be reporting Paludan to local prosecutors for charges of "agitation against an ethnic group."

Prime Minister Magdalena Andersson insisted that "people are allowed to express their opinions, whether they are in good or bad taste, that is part of our democracy. No matter what you think, you must never resort to violence. We will never accept it." Andersson also criticised Paludan for inciting tensions. Former Swedish Minister for Justice Morgan Johansson said that while Paludan should not have triggered the crisis and "seems for some reason to hate Sweden and try to harm Sweden... I do not understand why." Sweden would still uphold its tradition of freedom of speech and allow him to protest. Christian Democrats leader Ebba Busch argued (due to a large amount of police officers being injured by the rioters) that the police should have acted more harshly in response to the riots, asking "Why didn't we have one hundred injured Islamists, one hundred injured criminals, one hundred injured insurgents?"

Anders Widfeldt of the University of Aberdeen stated that the unrest tied "into ongoing debates in Denmark and Sweden about how far free speech can go and what amounts to legitimate critique and what amounts to an illegitimate provocation." Human rights NGO Civil Rights Defenders stated that goal of Paludan's tour was to "spread hatred toward Muslims and immigrants and systematically provoke these groups" and called for the Swedish government to "apply the legislation on hate speech in a way that is in line with international documents on human rights".

=== Role of the police ===
The riots have been characterised for the extent to which law enforcement were targeted. Anders Thornberg said that in some cases protesters "tried to kill police". In an interview with Agence France-Presse, Kivanc Atak of Stockholm University called the riots unusual in the sense that unlike most incidents causing conflict between police and minorities, the unrest was not directed against a specific case of police misconduct nor even the subject in general. Manne Gerell of Malmö University further added that some of those involved in the unrest might have been seeking to vent general frustration against police, such as over the use of stop and search powers. Former Swedish National Police Commissioner Anders Thornberg claimed that some rioters were suspected to have "links to criminal gangs" and that the police would look into it.

Following the Easter weekend, the Police Union in Östergötland called for an independent review into the handling of the clashes. Journalist Bilan Osman stated that the police "misjudged the situation," and should have stopped Paludan's rallies after the first outbreak of violence, instead of allowing them to continue, especially as the rallies were an attempt to incite hatred against the Muslim population of Sweden. Stefan Holgersson of Linköping University stated that the mishandling of the situation was in part caused by the fact that police in Sweden have largely moved away from the strategy of dialogue policing, reducing their ability to uphold high levels of trust from communities.

On 19 April, a demonstration was held against police brutality in Malmö in response to the police's use of guns in their handling of the events, attracting a crowd of several hundred protestors.

=== International reactions ===
The decision to allow Paludan to hold the demonstration attracted widespread condemnation from Islamic countries, including Iran, Iraq, Yemen, Jordan, Indonesia, Pakistan, the United Arab Emirates, and Saudi Arabia. Protests at the Swedish embassy in Iran developed, in which demonstrators allegedly chanted "traditional anti-Western slogans such as Death to America and Death to Israel."

The Islamist Islami Andolan Bangladesh movement launched a major demonstration in the Bangladeshi capital of Dhaka in protest to the Quran burning as well as recent clashes in Jerusalem. The organisation said that if the government did not present the matter to the United Nations and Organisation of Islamic Cooperation then it would "conclude that they [the Bangladeshi government] are working on behalf of Israel."

Turkish president Recep Erdoğan said that Sweden "can no longer expect our support for their NATO membership."

Chinese diplomat Wang Wenbin said that "Freedom of speech cannot be a reason to incite racial or cultural discrimination and tear society apart" and called for the Swedish government to "respect the religious beliefs of minority groups."

In a related incident, a Quran-burning rally was held by the anti-Islam Stop Islamisation of Norway (SIAN) group in Sandefjord, Norway on 24 April. 300-400 counter-protesters arrived at the scene, pelting SIAN members with eggs and rocks. Police intervened to stop further conflict.

== See also ==
- 2023 Quran desecration in Sweden
- List of riots in Sweden
- Quran desecration for a general overview of the practice
