= Mezher =

Mezher may refer to:

- Mezher, Lebanon, a town in the Matn District of the Mount Lebanon Governorate
- Alexandra Mezher (died 2016), a murdered Lebanese social worker
- Ali Mezher (born 1994), a Lebanese basketball player
- Mezher Family, one of the most predominant Lebanese families

== See also ==
- Mazhar Khaleqi (born 1938), a Kurdish folk singer
