= Killing of Alexandra Mezher =

2016 Sweden asylum center stabbing

The fatal stabbing of Alexandra Mezher occurred on 25 January 2016. Mezher, a 22-year-old worker at an asylum center, of Lebanese Christian origin, was stabbed by a male asylum seeker at a refuge for unaccompanied minors in Mölndal, Sweden. The attacker, a Somali male, was posing as an underage unaccompanied refugee claiming to be 15, but, after the attack, medical examination determined that he was at least 18 years old.

== Background ==
More than 160,000 applications for asylum were accepted in Sweden in 2015; that total included 35,400 unaccompanied minor refugees.

The asylum center where the attack took place is located near Gothenburg and was intended for minors between the ages of 14 and 17 who arrived in Sweden as asylum seekers without adult guardians. The center is owned and operated by HVB Living Nordic, which runs four HVB-hem ("Homes for Care or Living"), of which the Mölndal center is one.

Staff at the asylum center had expressed concerns about security to their employer. Mezher herself had expressed worries to her mother about being the guardian for "big powerful guys" aged up to 24. A preliminary investigation on occupational safety and health violations was started in March 2016 but dropped in April 2017.

The attack came shortly after National Police Commissioner Dan Eliasson requested 4,100 new staff and police officers to cover the increased demand for security at asylum centers, to carry out deportations, and to protect the country against terrorism.

== Killing ==
The incident started with the suspect attempting to commit suicide with a knife belonging to the asylum center. Mezher, the sole staff member present in the center at the time of the attack, was stabbed at the center and was later taken to a hospital with life-threatening injuries. The injuries proved fatal. Two fellow residents in the center, which housed eleven youths, helped overpower the attacker. One male resident was also stabbed in the process by the suspect but managed to avoid significant injuries.

Police refrained from releasing information about the attacker's identity for about three days, after which they stated that he had identified himself on arrival in Sweden as Youssaf Khaliif Nuur, a migrant from Somalia who claimed to be 15-years-old. On 11 February, the Swedish newspaper Göteborgs-Posten reported that the Swedish Migration Agency, in their decision to deny his application for residency, determined that the attacker was 18 or older.

According to the prosecutor in the stabbing case, medical examinations indicated that he was an adult. A psychiatric evaluation by the Swedish National Board of Forensic Medicine determined that the attacker likely suffered from a psychological disorder and recommended a more thorough evaluation before the trial.

Thomas Westin, station chief with the Stockholm City Police, called the killing "a high-profile crime."

== Victim ==
The victim, Lebanon-born 22-year-old Alexandra Mezher, worked at the center in the months prior to the attack out of a desire to "do good", according to one of her cousins.

== Aftermath ==
Sweden's Prime Minister, Stefan Löfven, visited the scene of the attack. He later told Radio Sweden that he "believe[s] that there are quite many people in Sweden who feel a lot of concern that there can be more cases of this kind when Sweden receives so many children and youth who come alone [to seek asylum]." The day after the stabbing, an editorial in Expressen called for the expulsion of migrants who committed crimes. The attack raised concerns about overcrowded conditions in Sweden's asylum centers, the possibility of adult migrants taking advantage of Swedish law to fraudulently register as minors.

== Trial ==
In May 2016, the attacker was charged with murder of Mezher and the attempted murder of another resident at the asylum center. According to the charge sheet, Mezher was stabbed three times before she fled to another room, with one of the wounds severing blood vessels in her thigh causing severe blood loss. The attacker was suicidal at the time and reportedly said he had tried to kill himself at the time of the attack. In August, 2016 he was found guilty of manslaughter, aggravated assault and attempted aggravated assault. He was sentenced to psychiatric care, ordered to pay SEK 300,000 in compensation to Mezher's family, and, if discharged, he will also be deported and forbidden from returning to Sweden until 2026. After appeal, the court of appeal upheld the sentence, except extending the deportation until 2031.

== See also ==
- Crime in Sweden
- Timeline of the European migrant crisis
