= Leni Björklund =

Swedish politician (born 1944)

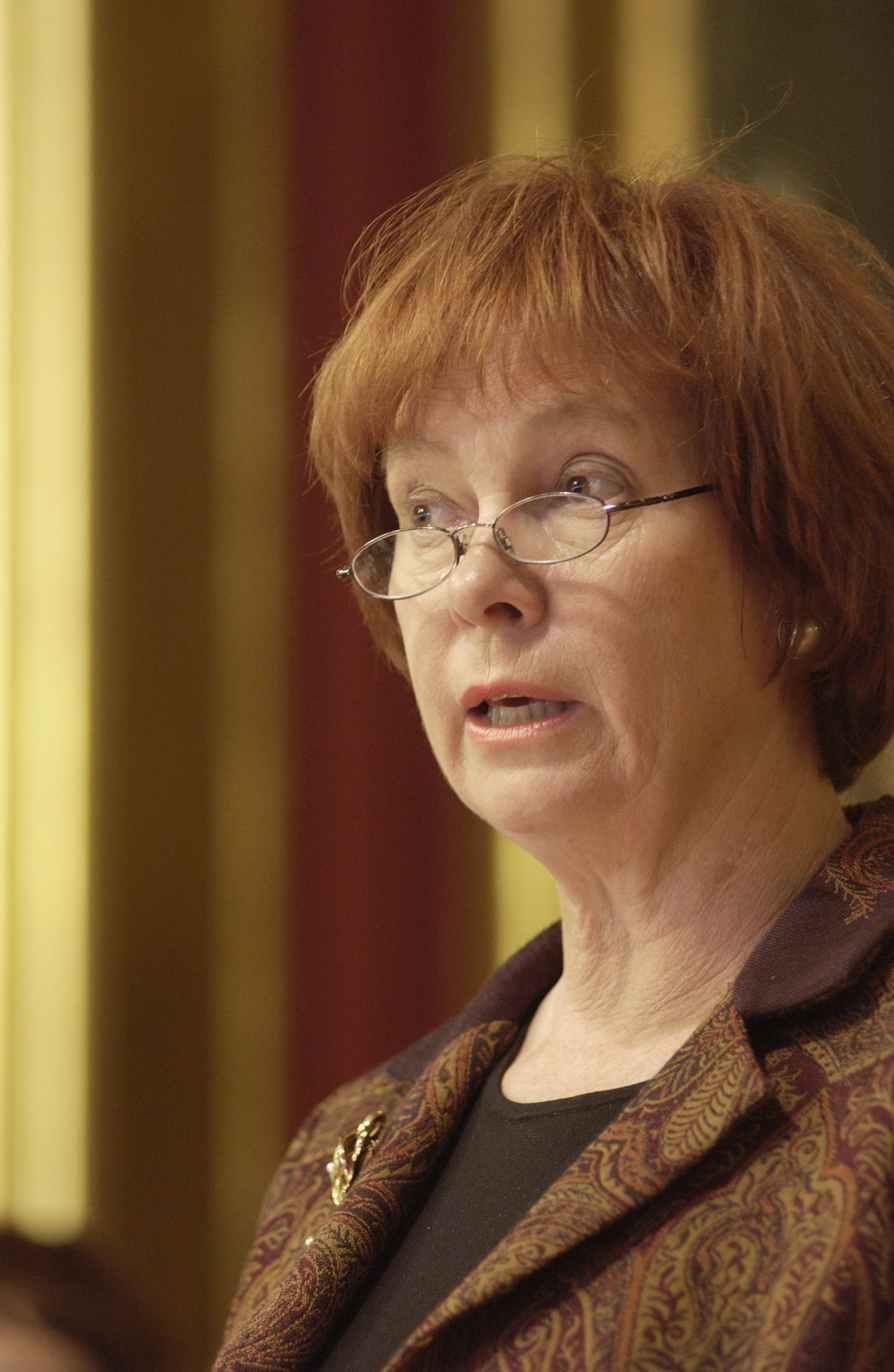
- Leni Björklund

Minister for Defence
- In office 21 October 2002 – 6 October 2006
- Prime Minister: Göran Persson
- Preceded by: Björn von Sydow
- Succeeded by: Mikael Odenberg

Personal details
- Born: 5 July 1944 (age 81) Örebro, Sweden
- Party: Social Democrats
- Occupation: Politician

Leni Christina Elisabeth Björklund (born 5 July 1944) is a Swedish Social Democratic politician. She served as Minister for Defence from 2002 to 2006.

Leni Björklund grew up in Örebro. She graduated from Uppsala University with a B.A. As a local politician, Björklund was a Commissioner in the 1970s and 1980s, first in Järfälla Municipality north of Stockholm 1977–1979, and later in Stockholm County Council 1980–1989. She went on to work as Managing Director for the Planning and Rationalisation Institute for the Health and Social Services.

When Prime Minister Göran Persson appointed her, on 21 October 2002, she was the secretary-general of the Church of Sweden, a position she had held since 1999. Björklund was Sweden's first female Minister for Defence.

As a female, she has not done any national service in the military of Sweden, and she was the first Minister of Defence to not have done so.

Leni Björklund holds an honorary doctorate degree from Karolinska Institutet, a Stockholm medical university.

Björklund has also been reported to Konstitutionsutskottet several times. In November 2005, she was reported for initiating military co-operation with the Islamist dictatorship of Saudi Arabia.

Political offices
Preceded by Björn von Sydow	Minister for Defence; 2002–2006	Succeeded by Mikael Odenberg
