= Regional Board =

Regional government in Sweden

In Sweden, a Regional Board (Swedish: regionstyrelse (before 1992 administrative committee and until 2019 county council board) is a governing body within Sweden's regions (formerly known as county councils) The regional board is appointed by the regional council and often consists of members from all parties in the regional council, but sometimes very small parties are not represented. The number of members on the regional board varies.

The task of the Regional Board is, among other things, to prepare matters for the Regional Council and implement the Regional Council's decisions.

The work is usually led by a paid regional council . The regional board may have one or more committees. Usually, civil servants in the municipality are often rapporteurs, while in the regional council, in principle only a regional director (when there is one) has the right to speak in addition to the council members.

== See also ==
- County administrative boards of Sweden
