= Dan Eliasson =

Swedish lawyer and civil servant

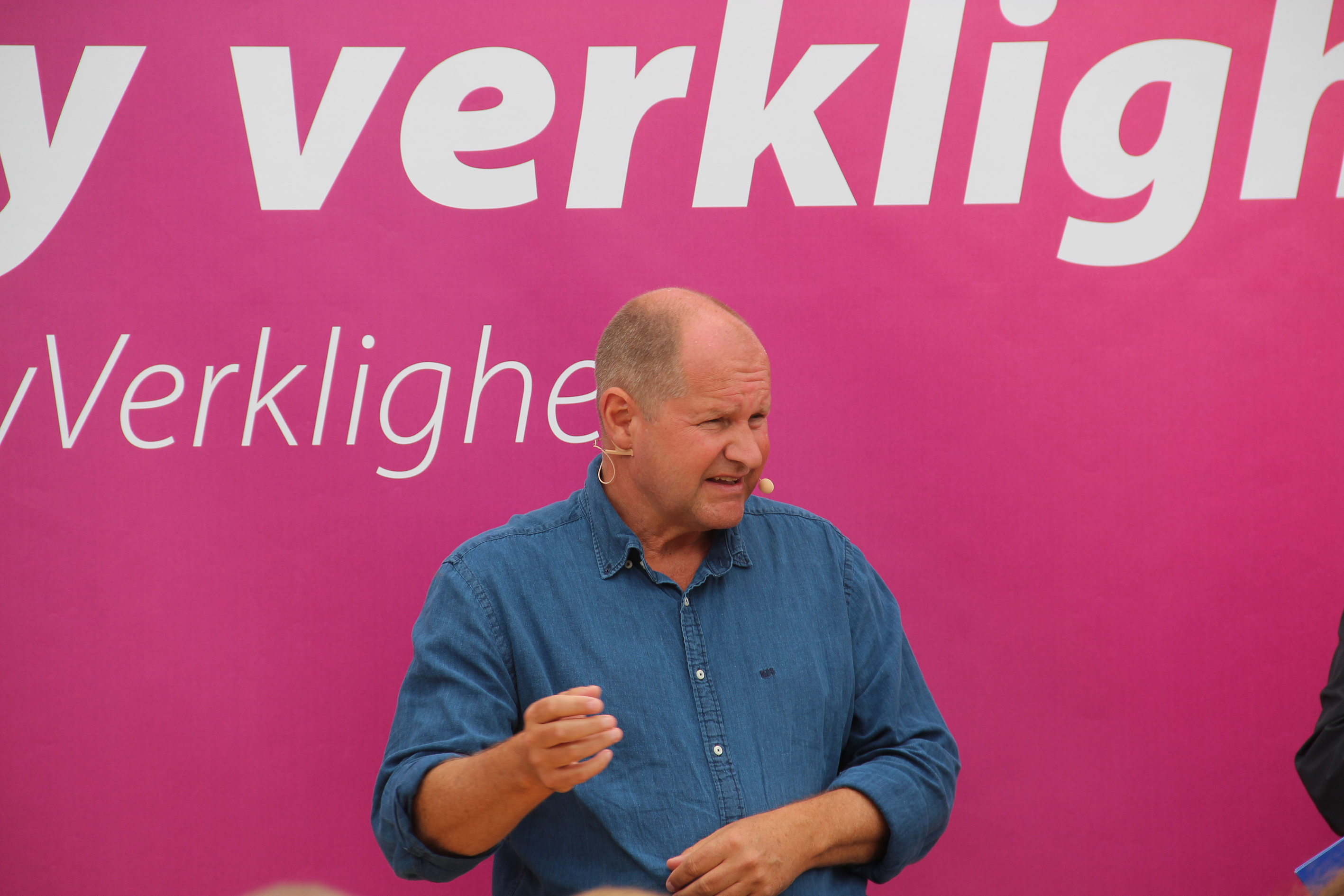
- Eliasson at an interview during the Almedalen Week, 2016

Director-General at the Ministry of Justice (Division for Crisis Preparedness)
- In office 7 January 2021 – 31 December 2022

Director-General of the Swedish Civil Contingencies Agency
- In office 5 March 2018 – 7 January 2021

National Police Commissioner of the Swedish Police Authority
- In office 1 January 2015 – 5 March 2018

Director-General of the Swedish Social Insurance Agency
- In office October 2011 – 1 January 2015

Director-General of the Swedish Migration Agency
- In office 2007–2011

Acting Chief of the Swedish Security Service
- In office 2006–2007

Personal details
- Born: 14 August 1961 (age 65) Sundsvall, Sweden
- Party: Social Democrats
- Education: Law
- Alma mater: Uppsala University
- Occupation: Civil servant

Dan Tore Eliasson (born 14 August 1961 in Sundsvall) is a Swedish lawyer and civil servant. He served as Director–General of the Swedish Migration Agency from 2007 to 2011, as Director–General of the Swedish Social Insurance Agency from 2011 to 2014, as National Police Commissioner from 2014 to 2018 and as Director–General of the Swedish Civil Contingencies Agency (MSB) from 2018 until his dismissal in 2021. After his dismissal in 2021, he was placed as Director-General of the Division of Crisis Preparedness of the Ministry of Justice until the end of 2022.

He was appointed National Police Commissioner by the Minister for Home Affairs in November 2014 and began serving on 1 January 2015. Eliasson is a graduate of law at Uppsala University. He has also served as ambassador and Chief of International Affairs at the Ministry of Justice from 1999–2001, as State Secretary under the Minister for Justice Thomas Bodström from 2001–2006 and as acting head of the Swedish Security Service in 2006.

== Head of the Swedish Social Insurance Agency ==
In October 2011 Eliasson became head of the Swedish Social Insurance Agency (Swedish: Försäkringskassan). As head of the agency he ordered the article about himself on Swedish Wikipedia to be edited by agency staff to remove criticism.

According to a staff poll at the agency, employees at the agency had very low confidence in Eliasson.

== Head of the Swedish Police Authority ==
In November 2014 Eliasson was appointed the new head of the Swedish Police Authority and he took up the position on 1 January 2015 while the authority was in the middle of a major restructuring. His appointment was criticized by the police union on the grounds that Eliasson is not a police officer and had no experience of policing.

In September 2015, during the ongoing European migration crisis, Eliasson, being the chief of police, blocked attempts by Swedish regional police and customs authorities to erect border controls. Consequently, the cabinet ministers received no request from the police to organise border checks. The controls were ordered in November 2016 by the cabinet.

On or about 27 January 2016, Eliasson sparked controversy in Sweden and beyond by appearing to sympathize with a "teenage" Somalian asylum-seeker accused of having murdered social worker Alexandra Mezher in Mölndal, a suburban community near Gothenburg. Later, it emerged that the killer was not under 18 and possibly not even a teenager, but had lied about his age in order to receive favourable treatment when claiming asylum.

In June 2016 Eliasson led a campaign to hand out armbands saying "don't grope" to curb groping and sexual assaults, like those at the 2014 and 2015 We Are Sthlm sexual assaults. The armbands were criticised as being ineffectual and they laid the responsibility for stopping the assaults on the victims instead of the perpetrators.

In December 2016, Sifo conducted a poll on public opinion on how Dan Eliasson performs as chief of police where 50% stated a negative or very negative view and 11% stated a positive or very positive view.

According to police reports commented upon by Eliasson in June 2015, high crime rate areas numbered 15 in 2015 and 23 in 2017. In October 2017 Eliasson was interviewed by SR Ekot where he was queried about his promise in May 2015 to regain control in areas of Sweden with high crime rates. Instead of regaining control, he admitted that the number of such areas had increased. He stated that two years earlier he had not predicted police resources would be saturated by migration, gang shootings, serious crime and terrorism to the degree that was the case. The reason for this inaccurate prediction was that policy makers including himself had not realised the full extent of the problems because they did not fit in the popular image of Sweden as a safe and prosperous country.

On January 31, 2018 it was announced that Eliasson would step down as Police Commissioner. His tenure as head of police ended on 15 February 2018 and he was replaced by Anders Thornberg.

== Head of the Swedish Civil Contingencies Agency ==
Eliasson commenced his position as head of the Swedish Civil Contingencies Agency on 5 March 2018.

Eliasson is as of 2018 the highest paid civil servant in Sweden with a monthly salary of 160,000 SEK ($20,000).

=== Controversy ===
During the COVID-19 outbreak his agency was among the institutions leading Sweden’s response to the pandemic.

In late December 2020, after the Civil Contingencies Agency urged all Swedes to avoid travel, he was photographed in Las Palmas airport on the island of Gran Canaria whilst on a family Christmas holiday. This controversy led to his decision on 6 January 2021, to ask for a transfer from head of MSB to another duty. On 21 January, the government offices announced that Eliasson would be appointed Director-General of the Division for Crisis Preparedness under the Ministry of Justice, the principal authority of the Civil Contingencies Agency. He will retain his title and full pay and his employment contract remains virtually unchanged.

== Trivia ==
Dan Eliasson is also known for his history in the punk scene with his band Bad Boo Band. The band's biggest hit was 1979 7-inch single "Knulla i Bangkok" (Fuck in Bangkok).

Civic offices
Preceded by Janna Valik	Director-General of the Swedish Migration Agency; 2007–2011	Succeeded by Christina Werner
Preceded by Adriana Lender	Director-General of the Swedish Social Insurance Agency; 2011–2014	Succeeded by Ann Persson Grivas
Preceded by Bengt Svenson	National Police Commissioner; 2015–2018	Succeeded by Anders Thornberg
Preceded by Helena Lindberg	Director-General of the Swedish Civil Contingencies Agency; 2018–2021	Succeeded by Camilla Asp as Acting
