= 2020 Sweden riots =

2020 riots in Sweden

- Location: Malmö, Sweden
- Date: 29–30 August 2020 (2 days); 7:00 PM, 29 August — 3:00 AM, 30 August
- Attack type: Riot
- Weapons: Stones, fireworks, metal bars
- No. of participants: 300 (est)
- Defenders: Malmö police department Danish Riot Vehicle Support

On 29 August 2020, riots broke out in the Swedish cities of Malmö and Ronneby. After Swedish police prevented Rasmus Paludan, a Danish politician convicted of various crimes including indictment against an ethnic group, from entering the country, a far-right anti-immigration group held protests and burned a Quran. In response, a group of 300 counter protestors, gathered, the protest descending into a riot.

== Incidents in Malmö ==
On 26 August 2020, police in Malmö denied Rasmus Paludan, a Danish far-right politician and the leader of Denmark's Hard Line party, permission to hold a meeting named "Islamization in the Nordic countries". On 28 August, he was deported and banned from entering Sweden. Swedish police suspected he would break the law. His supporters nonetheless went ahead with the event, and burned a copy of the Qur'an in Rosengård, a predominantly immigrant neighborhood. In a separate event, Paludan's supporters kicked a copy of the Qur'an around Malmö's main square like a football, for which three people were arrested on suspicion of inciting hatred.

At around 7 PM, about 300 people gathered in Malmö's Amiralsgatan street, south of the Rosengård Centrum Shopping Centre for a demonstration against the Qur'an burning, which soon turned violent. Rioters threw chunks of concrete and stones at the police, smashed bus shelters, overturned lampposts, and burned objects. Antisemitic chants were also raised in the gatherings. The riots continued till about 3 in the morning.

The police in Malmö received reinforcements from Gothenburg and police began using drones for aerial surveillance of the Rosengård district.

The unrest continued the following day, there were multiple incidents with arson in the Rosengård, Bellevuegården, Rådmansvången and Solbacken city districts. The Gullviskolan school was severely damaged by suspected arson. Three people were arrested with bottles containing flammable liquid suspected for preparing attacks on police or rescue services.

The riots gradually came to an end by 31 August after residents, police and religious leaders took to the streets to promote calm.

The rioters caused damage worth about a million kronor (about 100 thousand euros). Most of the costs were due to replacing and repairing street lights, traffic lights, bus shelters and cleaning up the area. This sum does not include costs for police actions.

== Incidents in Ronneby ==
The riots spread to Ronneby the following day when about 20 persons were involved in public violence in Ronneby, where they set fire to tires, threw rocks at police, emergency services and buildings. A policeman was wounded when he was struck by a rock. Arriving police were at first outmatched and had to retreat and wait for reinforcements. Three people were arrested and six were detained, suspected of violent rioting. The rioters protested against the burning of a Quran in front of a community building which was used by the Arab culture association (Swedish: Arabiska kulturföreningen) for Friday prayers. According to an eyewitness, the rioters attempted to set fire to a church in Ronneby but a bystander put out the fire with his jacket, whereupon the rioters attacked him and he was wounded. The riot got extensive exposure in social media.

== Aftermath ==
About 15 people were arrested, and several police officers were injured. Most of the suspects of the Ronneby riots were men aged 18-30 and previously known to police for trading narcotics, vandalism and theft.

On 31 August, the police started investigating reports of antisemitic hate speech from the Muslim rioters.

In November 2020, prosecutors declared that burning the Qu'ran does not constitute hate speech against a minority and therefore halted the investigation.

== Related events ==
On 29 August, clashes broke out at an anti-Islam rally in Oslo, Norway, after the Stop Islamisation of Norway (SIAN) group destroyed a Qur'an at the rally.

== See also ==
- Quran desecration
- List of riots in Sweden
- 2008 Malmö mosque riots
- 2022 Sweden riots
- Islam in Sweden
- Immigration and crime
