= Västra Götaland County =

County (län) of Sweden

Coordinates: 58°13′01″N 11°44′00″E

Västra Götaland County Västra Götalands län (Swedish)
- County
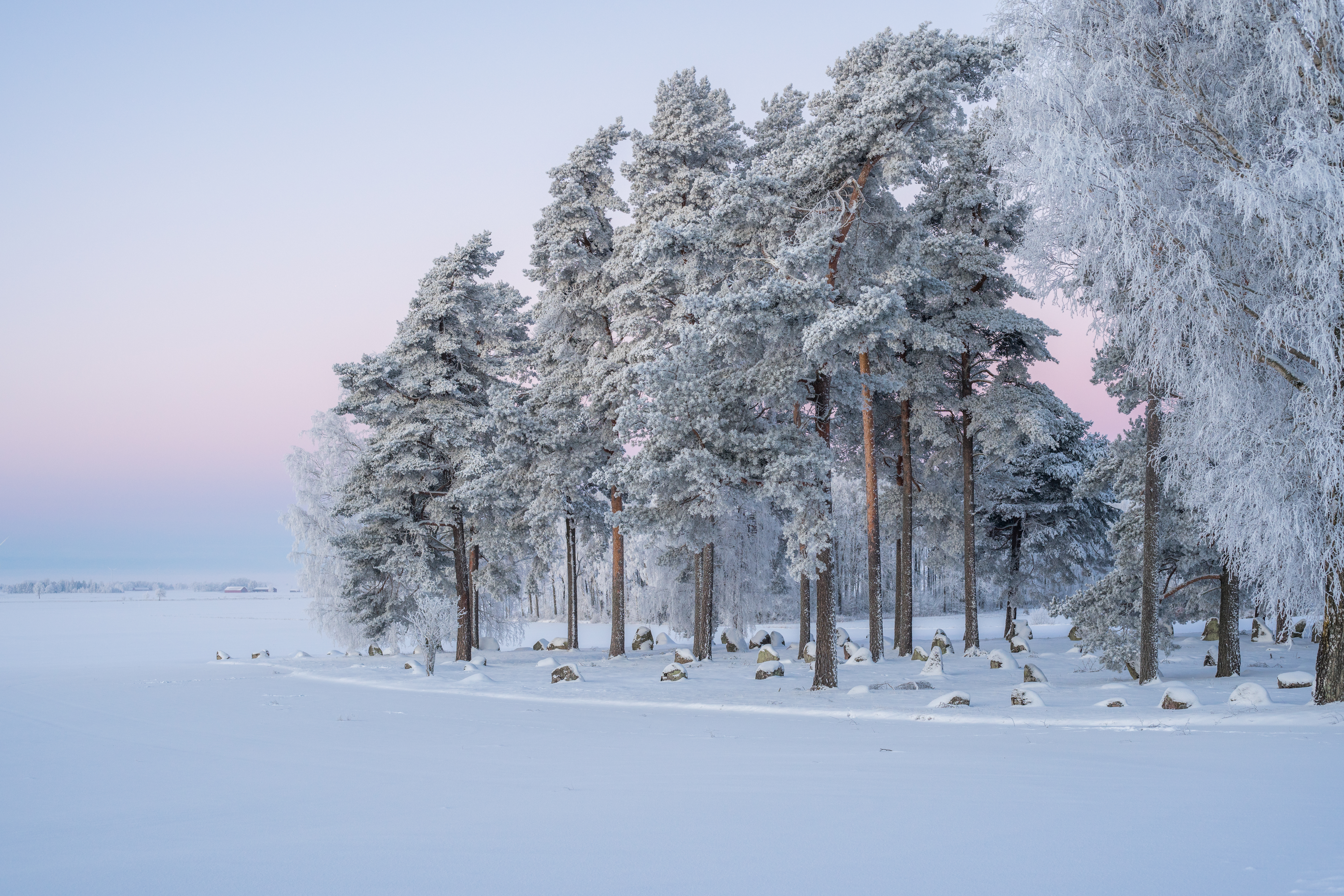
- The Brakelund burial ground in Lidköping, Sweden.

- Flag Coat of arms

- Västra Götaland County in Sweden

- Location map of Västra Götaland County in Sweden
- Country: Sweden
- Founded: 1 January 1998
- Capital: Vänersborg (Seat of Regional Council)/Gothenburg (Gubernatorial Seat)
- Municipalities: 49: Ale; Alingsås; Åmål; Bengtsfors; Bollebygd; Borås; Dals-Ed; Essunga; Falköping; Färgelanda; Götene; Gothenburg; Grästorp; Gullspång; Härryda; Herrljunga; Hjo; Karlsborg; Kungälv; Lerum; Lidköping; Lilla Edet; Lysekil; Mariestad; Mark; Mellerud; Mölndal; Munkedal; Öckerö; Orust; Partille; Skara; Skövde; Sotenäs; Stenungsund; Strömstad; Svenljunga; Tanum; Tibro; Tidaholm; Tjörn; Töreboda; Tranemo; Trollhättan; Uddevalla; Ulricehamn; Vänersborg; Vara; Vårgårda

Government
  - Governor: Sten Tolgfors (M)
  - Council: Region Västra Götaland

Area
  - Total: 23,942 km^{2} (9,244 sq mi)

Population (31 December 2023)
  - Total: 1,767,016
  - Rank: 2nd
  - Density: 73.804/km^{2} (191.15/sq mi)

GDP
  - Total: SEK 711 billion €76.030 billion (2015)
- Time zone: UTC+1 (CET)
  - Summer (DST): UTC+2 (CEST)
- ISO 3166 code: SE-O
- NUTS Region: SE232
- Website: www.o.lst.se

Västra Götaland County (Swedish: Västra Götalands län [ˈvɛ̂stra ˈjøːtaˌlɑːnds lɛn]) is a county or län on the western coast of Sweden.

The county is the second most populous of Sweden's counties and it comprises 49 municipalities (kommuner). Its population of 1,616,000 amounts to 17% of Sweden's population. The formal capital and seat of the governor of Västra Götaland County is Gothenburg. The political capital and seat of the Västra Götaland Regional Council is Vänersborg.

The county was established on 1 January 1998, when Älvsborg County, Gothenburg and Bohus County and Skaraborg County were merged.

== Provinces ==
Sweden's counties are generally of greater importance than its provinces. The counties are the main administrative units for politics and population census counts.

Due to its size and young age, the Västra Götaland County has no common heritage. Of cultural and historical significance are the provinces that Västra Götaland County consists of: Västergötland, Bohuslän and Dalsland. There is also an insignificant part of the province Halland within the county.

In addition, the previous counties that were abolished in 1998 had been in use since the 17th century, and therefore have some cultural and historical significance.

== Neighbours ==
Västra Götaland County borders to the counties of Värmland, Örebro, Östergötland, Jönköping and Halland. It is also bounded by the Norwegian counties of Østfold and Vestfold (Note: Strömstad Municipality has a maritime border to Færder Municipality in the Norwegian county of Vestfold.) both with a land and maritime border, lakes Vättern and Vänern, as well as the strait of Skagerrak.

== Administration ==
Västra Götaland was created in 1998 by a merger of the three former counties of Gothenburg and Bohus County, Älvsborg County and Skaraborg County. The seat of residence for the Governors or Landshövding is Gothenburg, while the seat of political administration and power is Vänersborg. The Governor is the head of the County Administrative Board or Länsstyrelse.

The 2010 election in Västra Götaland was rerun when the Election Review Board of the Swedish Parliament voided the original election "due to mistakes and irregularities in the handling of ballots."

== Politics ==
The Västra Götaland Regional Council or Västra Götalandsregionen is an evolved County Council that for a trial period has assumed certain tasks from the County Administrative Board. Similar trial councils are applied for Skåne County and Gotland County.

== Notable people ==
- Anton Julius Carlson (1875–1956), Swedish American physiologist, was born in Svarteborg, Västra Götaland County.
- Kjell Johansson (born 1951), tennis player

== Municipalities ==
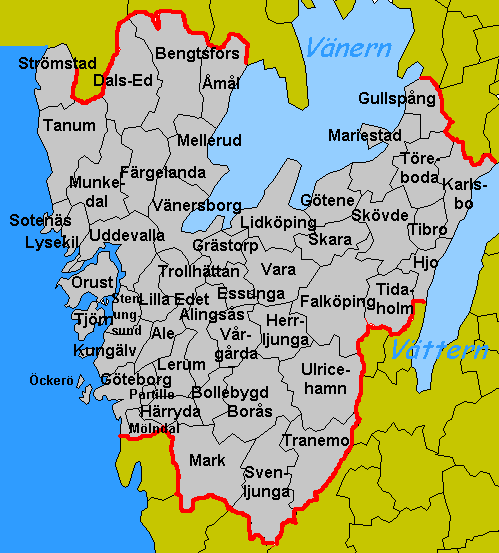
- Ale
- Alingsås
- Bengtsfors
- Bollebygd
- Borås
- Dals-Ed
- Essunga
- Falköping
- Färgelanda
- Grästorp
- Gullspång
- Götene
- Gothenburg
- Herrljunga
- Hjo
- Härryda
- Karlsborg
- Kungälv
- Lerum
- Lidköping
- Lilla Edet
- Lysekil
- Mariestad
- Mark
- Mellerud
- Munkedal
- Mölndal
- Orust
- Partille
- Skara
- Skövde
- Sotenäs
- Stenungsund
- Strömstad
- Svenljunga
- Tanum
- Tibro
- Tidaholm
- Tjörn
- Tranemo
- Trollhättan
- Töreboda
- Uddevalla
- Ulricehamn
- Vara
- Vårgårda
- Vänersborg
- Åmål
- Öckerö

== Heraldry ==
The arms for the County of Västra Götaland were granted in 1998 when the county was formed. They are a combination of the provincial arms of Västergötland, Bohuslän and Dalsland and the arms of the city of Gothenburg. When the arms are shown with a royal crown they represent the County Administrative Board, which is the regional presence of (royal) government authority. Blazon: "Quartered, I. the arms of Gothenburg II. the arms of Bohuslän III. the arms of Dalsland turned in courtoisie, IV. the arms of Västergötland."

== Demographics ==
=== Country of birth ===
Foreign born population by country of birth
Country of birth	1970	1976	1981	1986	1991	1996	2001	2006	2011	2016	2021	2024
Syria	20						1,920	2,311	2,833	23,190	30,682	31,309
Iraq	12						10,401	14,562	20,036	21,484	23,551	23,253
Iran				2,191	9,406	12,178	12,997	14,225	15,852	17,393	20,379	21,302
Finland	43,090	39,234	39,155	34,735	31,776	29,768	27,846	25,994	23,737	21,549	18,825	17,019
Somalia							3,209	3,793	8,037	14,669	17,201	16,735
Poland	1,705	2,624	3,544	4,931	4,893	6,295	6,413	7,614	10,519	12,524	13,962	14,873
India	144			1,446	1,774	1,942	2,136	2,666	3,297	5,006	10,269	13,759
Bosnia and Herzegovina						9,368	11,231	12,494	12,765	13,278	13,761	13,575
Yugoslavia	7,557	8,421	8,238	8,563	9,824	14,649	15,301	15,609	14,849	14,136	13,245	12,657
Afghanistan	8						931	1,632	2,578	5,320	10,317	11,616
Norway	12,699	12,791	11,908	12,391	14,030	11,761	11,869	12,512	11,834	11,326	10,695	10,283
Germany	6,949	6,722	6,571	6,154	6,224	6,249	6,660	7,479	8,066	8,174	8,507	9,187
Turkey	625	1,197	2,066	3,474	3,613	3,920	4,198	4,804	5,890	6,459	7,859	8,862
China	130						1,666	2,582	4,176	4,967	6,487	7,154
Thailand	19						1,696	3,040	4,926	5,809	6,644	6,757
Romania	186						1,749	1,977	3,495	4,523	5,864	6,416
Lebanon	63						4,273	4,812	5,002	5,425	5,941	5,982
United Kingdom	1,034	1,350	1,699	1,901	2,341	2,625	2,997	3,355	4,035	4,572	5,287	5,397
Eritrea							422	710	1,218	3,406	5,073	5,378
Ukraine							275	463	713	973	1,472	5,171
Denmark	7,114	8,873	7,626	7,287	7,920	6,647	6,270	5,982	5,553	5,120	4,710	4,410
Pakistan	29						535	740	1,314	1,648	3,386	4,291
Vietnam							1,934	2,363	2,890	3,461	4,182	4,242
Chile	29			2,237	3,665	3,697	3,774	3,889	3,925	3,873	3,831	3,779
United States	2,534	2,395	2,198	2,151	2,225	2,287	2,396	2,458	2,693	2,996	3,522	3,725
Ethiopia	28						2,041	1,871	2,083	2,742	3,618	3,709
North Macedonia							728	1,067	1,460	2,134	3,072	3,384
Serbia								59	1,335	2,146	3,205	3,299
Russia	1,907	1,712	1,594	1,468	1,576	1,472	930	1,558	2,041	2,458	2,783	3,265
Philippines	15						1,266	1,633	2,090	2,436	2,925	3,248

== See also ==
- List of Västra Götaland Governors
