= Mikael Odenberg =

Swedish politician

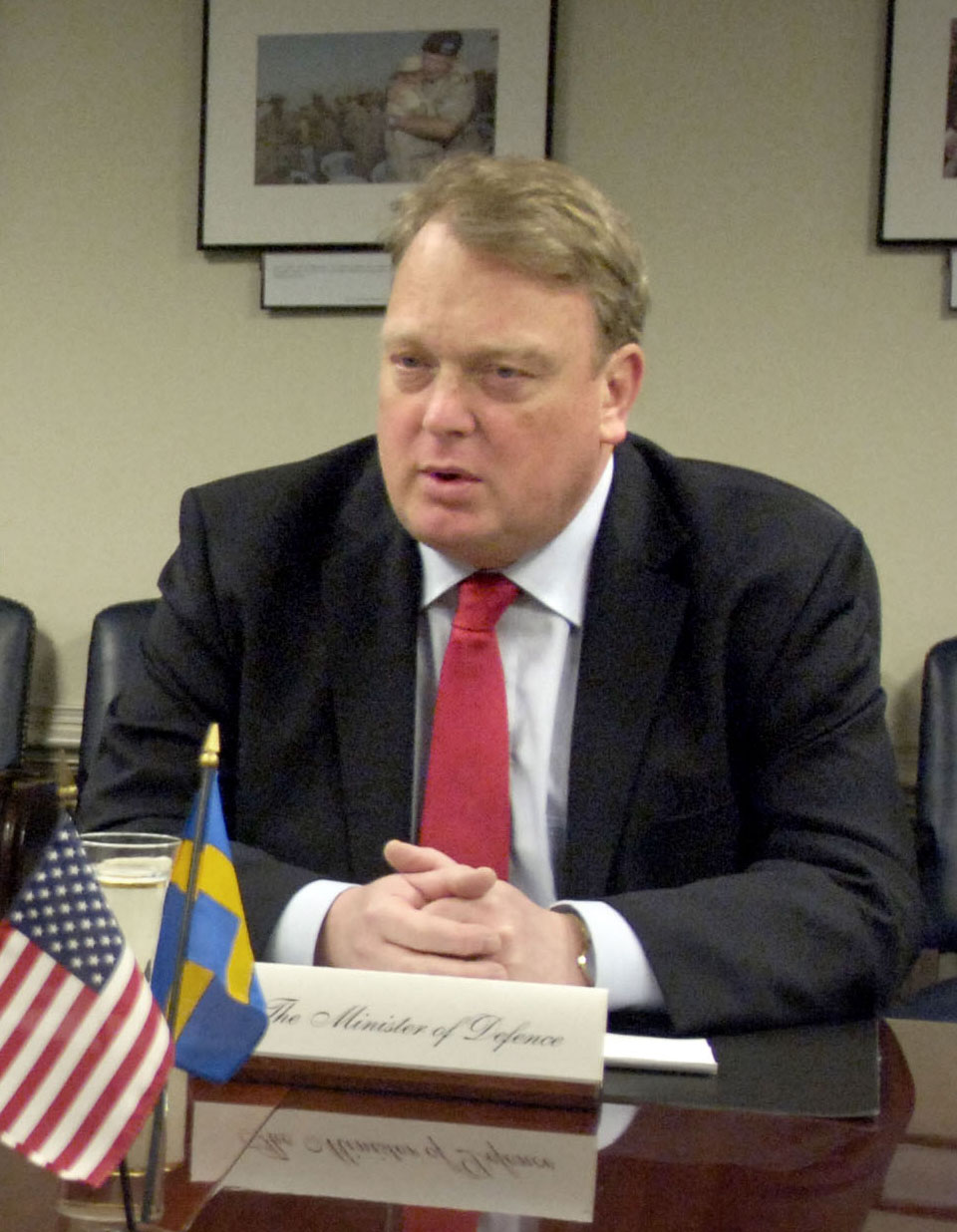
- Mikael Odenberg during a visit to the USA in April 2007

Minister for Defence
- In office 6 October 2006 – 5 September 2007
- Prime Minister: Fredrik Reinfeldt
- Preceded by: Leni Björklund
- Succeeded by: Sten Tolgfors

Personal details
- Born: 14 December 1953 (age 72) Stockholm, Sweden
- Party: Moderate Party
- Education: Stockholm University; Stockholm School of Economics
- Occupation: Politician, Major

Mikael Ingemarsson Odenberg (born 14 December 1953) is a Swedish politician of the Moderate Party. He was a Member of Parliament from 1991 to 2006 and Minister for Defence in the Swedish government from 2006 to 2007. From 1 March 2008 to 28 February 2017 he was the director-general of Svenska kraftnät.

== Education and military service ==
Mikael Odenberg performed his military service in the Coastal Artillery at the KA 4 training regiment in Gothenburg from 1973 to 1974. He finished with good grades and went through Reserve Officer Training in 1976. He also finished a management course at the Swedish National Defence College in 1994. As a Second Lieutenant he was trained at the Söderarm battery in the Roslagen archipelago, outside Stockholm. Odenberg today formally holds the rank of Major.

From 1975 to 1976 Odenburg studied economics at Stockholm University and from 1976 to 1978 he studied at the Stockholm School of Economics.

== Political career ==
From 1972 to 1973, Odenberg was a local government ombudsman for the Moderate Youth League and the Moderate Party in Nacka Municipality outside Stockholm. In 1978 he was elected secretary-general of the Moderate Youth League; and from 1979 to 1985 he was deputy secretary to the Stockholm City Commissioner (real estate, town planning and highway departments) and secretary to the Moderate City Council Group. From 1988 to 1991 he was leader of the Moderate Party's group on healthcare matters in Stockholm County Council. In 1987 and 1991 Odenberg also served as a substitute Member of Parliament. Odenberg was elected as a Member of Parliament in 1991. He served as a member of the parliament's Committee on Housing from 1991 to 1994; as a member of the Committee on Industry and Trade from 1994 to 1998; as a member of the Committee on Labour Market and Committee on EU Affairs from 1998 to 2002; as deputy chairman of the Committee on Industry and Trade from 2002 to 2003; as a member of the War Delegation in 2003; and as leader of the Moderate Party parliamentary group, deputy chairman of the Committee on Finance, and member of the Advisory Council on Foreign Affairs from 2003 to 2006.

On 6 October 2006 Odenberg was appointed as Minister for Defence. He resigned from this post on 5 September 2007 in protest against planned government defence cuts. At a press conference Odenberg said "I want to be able to face myself in the mirror and look our military in the eye".

== Personal life ==
Mikael Odenberg is married to Catherine, and has four children. He lives with his family in Stockholm.

His sister is Christina Odenberg, a former Bishop of Lund.

Political offices
Preceded by Leni Björklund	Minister for Defence; 2006–2007	Succeeded by Sten Tolgfors
Professional and academic associations
Preceded by Frank Rosenius	President of the Royal Swedish Academy of War Sciences; 2014–2018	Succeeded by Sverker Göranson
