= Ellinge Castle =

Building in Eslöv Municipality, Skåne County, Sweden

- Ellinge slott
- Eslöv Municipality
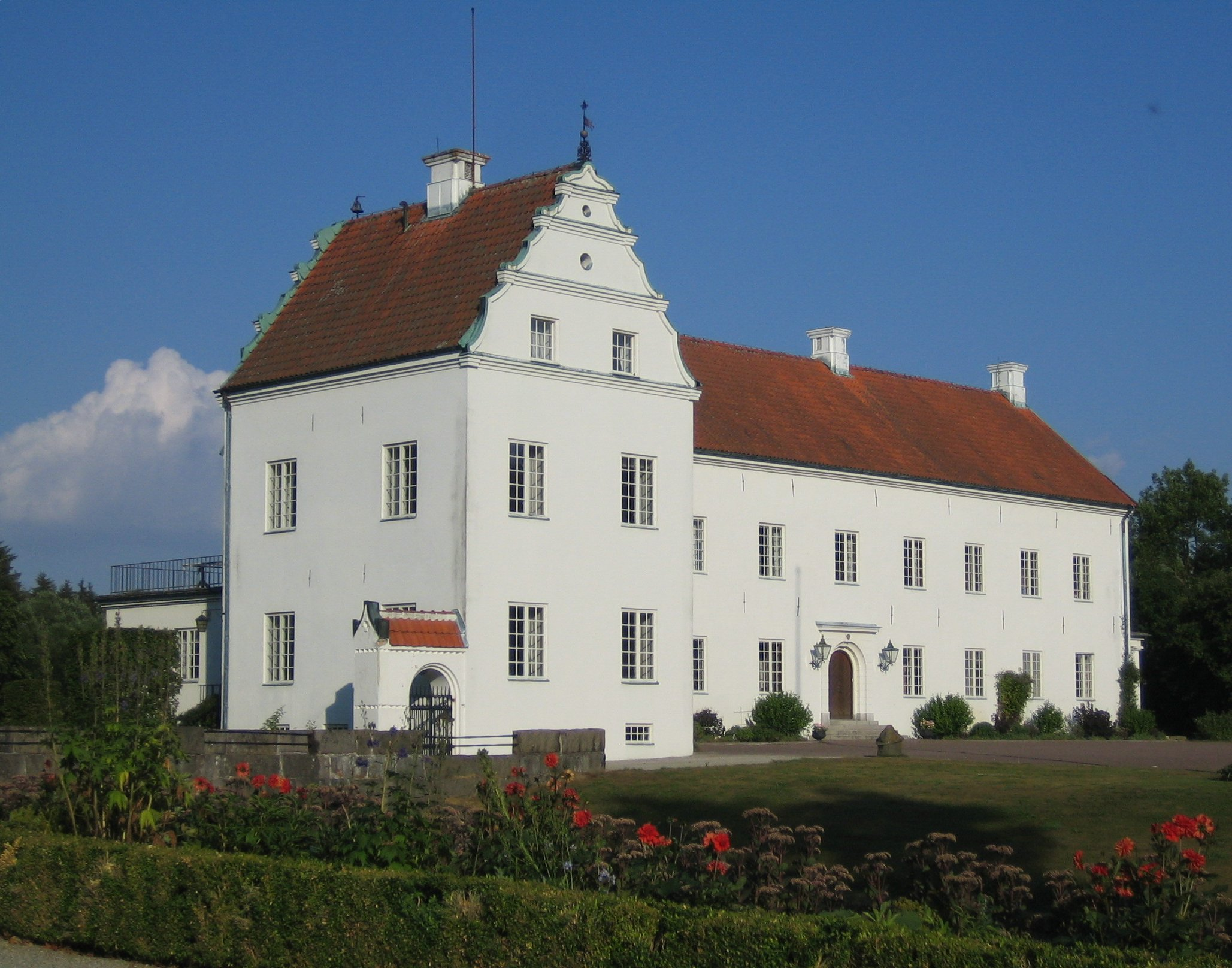
- Ellinge Castle

Site information
- Type: Castle
- Open to the public: No

Location
- Scania, Sweden
- Coordinates: 55.8117°N 13.2875°E

Site history
- Built: 16th century

Ellinge Castle (Swedish: Ellinge slott) is a castle in Eslöv Municipality, Scania, southern Sweden.

The castle dates from the 12th century. It has whitewashed walls with 12 overnight rooms and a capacity for 24 overnight guests. The castle is surrounded by a square moat.

== History of the Castle Estate ==
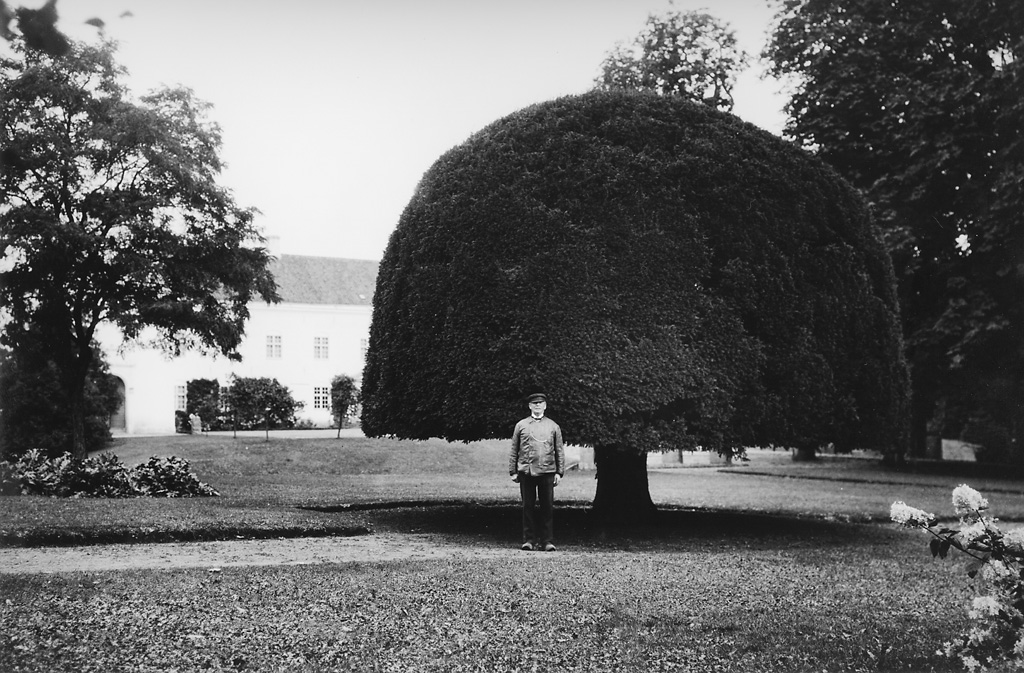
Yew tree at the castle, which was 100 years old in 1927.

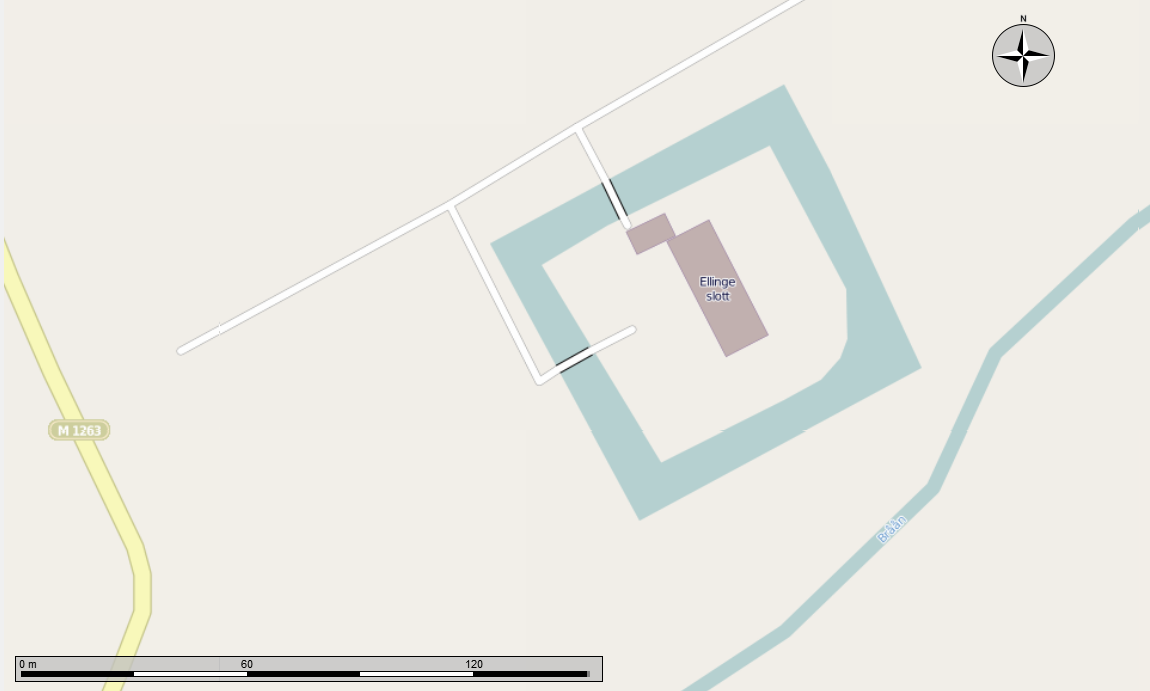
Map showing the square moat surrounding the property.

A description of the castle published in 1859 describes the castle as "Ellinge: Farm seat in Sallerups parish and Harjagers district of Malmo County, among one of Scania's oldest farms, has always been in the possession of high-born men."

The history of the estate can be traced at least as far as the 11th century. One of the first families known to have owned Ellinge was named Kvite. The estate then passed to the house of Galen in the early 13th century, when it was found to be a defensible manor adapted both for agriculture and had ability to house many people. It next went to the Erlandsen family.

In 1371 the estate was taken over by Peder Axelsson Thott. It remained in his family, operating as a cattle ranch until 1395, when Niels Svendsen Chevron took possession of Ellinge . The estate was then in the Sparres family's possession until 1505. Ellinge was given to the Danish crown in 1505, and was then sold in 1511 to the Norwegian-Danish Councilor Henry Krummedige. Ellinge is mentioned in connection with one of the many Danish-Swedish battles that took place during this time. A farm steward writes in a letter to his master about the looting of Ellinge by Søren Norby in the Scanian rebellion taking place at the time. Walnut trees are described as growing on the estate at this time; walnut trees can still be seen on the estate in modern times.

Christoffer Walkendorff, who was Ellinge's Manager from 1640 to 1690, describes the property in a written report as having a courtyard with a four-winged house group, a barn and being surrounded by a moat. From images of the estate at the time, it appears to have had a garden consisting of an embroidery parterre. It is also very likely that there was a vegetable garden somewhere inside or outside the moat.

Around 1650–1730, not much was done with the property due to the many wars in southern Sweden. In 1690, Hans Walkendorff took over the estate from his father; he was an alcoholic and did not look after the estate. Highly indebted, Hans sold the dilapidated property to Margareta von Ascheberg who, along with her husband, had previously lent money to Walkendorff. Margareta also owned many other estates, and she did little to repair Ellinge. The estate was then given to her son-in-law Wilhelm Bennet, baron and governor of Halland County, in 1724. Wilhelm began major repairs to Ellinge in 1735; he tore down the majority of the buildings in the courtyard except for the main building. It underwent major changes; the wings were demolished and it was reduced by one floor to a two-story house. Two new, stand-alone half-timbered cabins were built at the northern and southern end of the property. A written description of the property from around this time describes three gardens, one of which one was located inside the moat, where it surrounded the main building and the southern wing.

By 1783, the estate held a malting house where beer was produced. To the east of the castle yard was a blacksmith shop and three houses for artisans. The gardener's plot, or pasture as it was called, is not detailed in a painting of the estate, suggesting that was for private use. South of Bråån, near the courtyard's southeast corner, was a mill named Damstorps. To the east of the mill, in the river, lay an island called Åholmen, which was used by the gentry at Ellinge in the latter half of the 18th century for an unknown purpose. The castle was still in the von Ascheberg family at this time.

A sketch by Adolf Fredrik Barnekow called "Plan D'Ellinge" done in 1768 shows a three-part landscaping west of the castle, in accordance with earlier sources. The moat is also visible with rectangularly arranged cultivation blocks on both sides of the laneway.

The next referenced owners of Ellinge are Carl Fredrik Dücker and Christina Brita Bennet, who owned Ellinge from 1740 to 1790. In the 19th century, Ellinge had three different owners. The first, Carl Fredrik Dücker II made a career in the military, during which time the estate's appearance did not change much. The next owners are named as Charles Frederick Dücker III and Christian Fredrik Wrangel.

A map from 1827 shows the estate largely unchanged from the 18th century. The area south of the castle, outside the moat, is seen in a map from 1827, which looks to be freely planted with trees. This is an inaccessible area located on a hillside between the moat and Braan; the trees may have served as windbreaks or just been used to beautify the castle setting. A warehouse was added to the west of the palace sometime after 1760. A park on the south side (called Distillery Park) held a distillery which had evolved from a small malthouse in the 18th century to large a distillery yard with two larger houses. The distilling of spirits was an important source of income for the farm/estate by transforming corn and potatoes into cash by selling the resulting liquor. Sometime between 1890-91 and 1913 the distillery building was demolished and distillery operations moved westward beyond the landscaping on the property.

In 1828 Lieutenant Carl Fredrik Dücker III inherited Ellinge from his father. He owned the estate for 61 years until his death in 1889. During this time, Dücker III took leave from the military and engaged in the management of his estate. He renovated the estate and developed the agricultural portion of the property. Dücker III was a lifelong bachelor and made Ellinge a focal point for young academics, writers, the parish vicar and several priests, who like him were humanists and shared his interest in literature and art. He also financially supported young artists. In 1854 Dücker III made improvements to the main building. In connection with these he demolished the old half-timbered northern wing, and built several new barn buildings north of the old ones, which were allowed to remain in place.

During Dücker III's time the park and gardens around Ellinge underwent a fundamental transformation. He created a romantic park with a meandering path system sometime between 1827 and 1890, seeking to create a more romantic location out of the estate. Dücker hired gardeners to tend to the estate.

In the area to the south of a large meadow bisected by the Braan river was a mineral-rich natural source that was used by both local peasants and gentry, around which was a spa pavilion. There were the necessary facilities for those who wanted to come and drink of its physician-certified wholesome water. Today, the source is partially hidden under the trees, but it is still oozing rust colored water. The remains of the spa in the form of large stones still remain. The widow of Dücker III, Countess Dücker, still lived in the castle until his death in 1897.

Christian Fredrik Wrangel, Dücker III's niece's son, inherited Ellinge in 1889. The southern wing from the 18th century was demolished around 1910, giving the estate its current look. The new owner-couple never lived at the castle and it was then uninhabited for 53 years until 1950 when it was sold at auction.

== Vodka production ==
Purity Vodka is made in a still on the property using "estate-grown wheat and barley, and water from the Ellinge Castle's own spring, rich in minerals and iron".

== See also ==
- List of castles in Sweden
