= Wilhelm Bennet =

Swedish politician

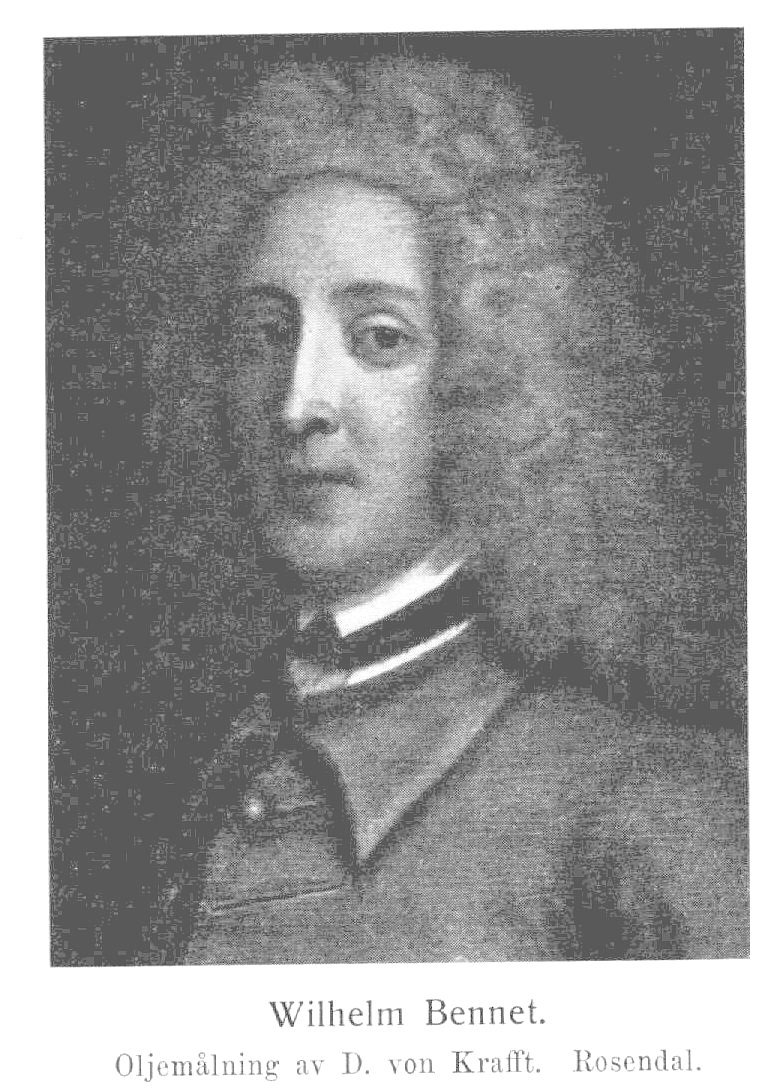

Wilhelm Bennet was the Governor of Halland County in Sweden from 1728 to 1737 and the Governor of Malmöhus County from 1737 to 1740.

== Biography ==
His paternal grandfather was William Bennet (died 1647), the minister of Trinity College Kirk in Edinburgh.

Bennet inherited Ellinge Castle in 1724 and made major repairs to the estate.
