= Sven Ranck =

Swedish statesman

Sven Ranck (1616–1684) was a Swedish statesman. Between 1678 and 1684, he served as the Governor of Halland County. He was the owner from 1674 to 1731 of the Marieberg residence in Bohuslän.
