= Jolly Bugarin =

Filipino retired military officer, lawyer, and criminologist

9th Director of the National Bureau of Investigation
- In office 1967–1986
- President: Ferdinand E. Marcos
- Preceded by: Serafin Fausto
- Succeeded by: Jesus Antonio Carpio

President, Interpol
- In office 1980–1984
- Preceded by: Carl Persson
- Succeeded by: John R. Simpson

Personal details
- Born: Jolly Bugarin Calapan, Mindoro
- Died: September 2002
- Education: University of the Philippines (BA, Law), Washington State University (BA, MA)
- Profession: lawyer, soldier

Military service
- Branch/service: Philippine Army
- Years of service: 1941–1962
- Rank: Colonel

Jolly del Rosario Bugarin (died September 2002) was a Filipino criminologist who served as 9th Director of the National Bureau of Investigation from 1967 to 1986 and President of Interpol from 1980 to 1984.

== Early life and education ==
Bugarin was born in Calapan, Mindoro, to Sesinando Bugarin and Sotera del Rosario. He finished his elementary and secondary education in Calapan. He finished his law degree at the University of the Philippines in 1939. While there, he was a member of the Upsilon Sigma Phi fraternity and the UP Vanguard. After graduating, he was drafted to serve under the Second Regular Division of the Philippine army during World War II.

In 1950, he took the Officers Investigation Course in Camp Gordon, Georgia. He finished his bachelor's degree (1952) and Master of Arts (1955) in Police Science and Administration at the Washington State University in Pullman, Washington. He was elected into the Phi Kappa Phi, Phi Beta Kappa, and Alpha Kappa-Delta Honor Societies.

== Career ==
=== Military service ===
Bugarin first entered the Philippine Army after graduating from law school, served during World War II, and survived the Bataan Death March. Afterwards, he remained in the Armed Forces of the Philippines until he went abroad for higher studies. In 1962, he retired from the army with a colonel's rank. Upon retirement, he practiced law and served as a criminalistics and bank security Consultant.

=== National Bureau of Investigation (NBI) ===
In 1967, he was appointed Director of the National Bureau of Investigation (NBI). He concurrently served as Commissioner to the NAPOLCOM, Consultant to the Dangerous Drugs Board; Security Consultant to the Central Bank of the Philippines, Development Bank of the Philippines, and the Philippine National Bank; Head of the National Central Bureau of Interpol-Manila; and an elected member of the International Criminal Police Organization Executive Committee. NBI Director Bugarin was portrayed by veteran actor Ernie Zarate in two NBI movies, Epimaco Velasco Story in 1994 and Mariano Mison Story in 1997.

=== Interpol ===
From 1967 to 1986, Bugarin represented the Philippines in annual Interpol conferences. In 1970, he was a delegate to the World Criminologists Association Conference in Madrid, Spain. In 1971, he headed the Philippine delegation to the International Conference on Narcotics Control at Canberra, Australia. In 1972, he was delegate to the United Nations Conference to amend a Single Convention of Geneva. He was Chairman of the Third ASEAN Interpol Conference; member, Executive Committee, Fourth Congress on Medical Law; head delegate, 1978 Meeting of ASEAN Drugs Experts at Jakarta, Indonesia; and President, Bureau Directors Association Inc. in 1977.

He was elected president of Interpol in 1980 and served until 1984.

== Controversies ==
Bugarin was considered a crony for the Marcos administration. In 1986, a case was filed against Bugarin for ill-gotten properties, including house and lots in North Greenhills and Valle Verde Subdivisions and club shares in Manila Polo Club and Makati Sports Club. In 2002, the Supreme Court said Bugarin “amassed wealth” amounting to P2.1 million between 1968 and 1980. In defense, Bugarin argued that the said properties were acquired prior to his appointment to the NBI. In 2013, the Presidential Commission on Good Government reported that the Supreme Court issued a writ of execution in favor of the government.

In 2014, Bugarin's forfeited assets were auctioned by the Philippine government.

== Masonry ==
Bugarin was initiated into Freemasonry in 1946. In 1972, he became Master of Tamaraw Lodge No. 65. He was elected Junior Grand Warden in 1976, Senior Grand Warden in 1977, Deputy Grand Master in 1978, and Grand Master in 1979.

== Personal life ==
Jolly was married to the late Linda Hortillas with whom he had three daughters Aileen, Pinky, and Annette.

== Death ==
Bugarin died in September 2002.

== Pop Culture ==
Director Bugarin was played twice by veteran actor Ernie Zarate in two NBI movies, Epimaco Velasco: NBI starring Fernando Poe, Jr., and Mariano Mison: NBI starring Eddie Garcia.
