= Project Simoom =

Business case aimed to build a propellant and explosives factory in Saudi Arabia

Project Simoom was the name of a business case involving the Swedish Defence Research Agency (FOI) and Saudi Arabia, which aimed to build a propellant and explosives factory in Saudi Arabia to modify anti-tank weapon systems Details about the project were revealed to the public on 7 March 2012 by investigative journalists Daniel Öhman and Bo-Göran Bodin at the Swedish public radio broadcaster Sveriges Radio. The project was criticized for constituting a possible breach of Swedish arms trade laws, and for its secretive nature. It resulted in the resignation of Defence Minister Sten Tolgfors on 29 March 2012 and in FOI ending its participation in the project.
