= Hans von Dellingshausen =

Swedish statesman and soldier

Hans von Dellingshausen (1641–8 January 1705) was a Swedish statesman and soldier. Between 1698 and 1705, he served as the Governor of Halland County.

He was born in Gothenburg, named after a great-uncle from Reval (Tallinn) in Estonia on March 24, 1641. He left Sweden at age 15 and became a musketeer in the French guards by 1660. In 1663 he had advanced to corporal at French cavalry regiment and fought in the Portuguese Restoration War. He was one of the fighting French soldiers on the Iberian peninsula under the command of Frederick Schomberg, 1st Duke of Schomberg.
