= Lars Bäckström =

Swedish politician (born 1953)

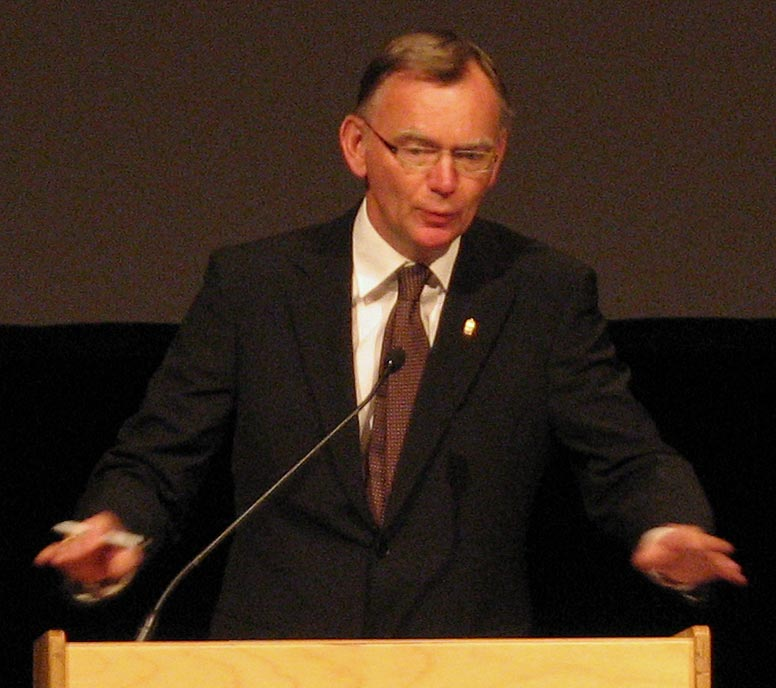
Bäckström in 2008.

Lars Christer Bäckström (born March 16, 1953, in Uddevalla) is a Swedish Left Party politician. He was a member of the Parliament of Sweden 1988–2006. In 2008 he was appointed Governor of Västra Götaland County.

== Bibliography ==
- Motions to the Swedish Parliament 1999/2000_proposing national support of the Incubator Project_Venture Capital
