= Katarina Tolgfors =

Swedish politician (born 1967)

Member of the Riksdag
- Incumbent
- Assumed office 18 October 2022
- Preceded by: Elisabeth Svantesson
- Constituency: Örebro County

Personal details
- Born: 25 January 1967 (age 59) South Korea
- Party: Moderate Party
- Spouse: Sten Tolgfors

Mia Katarina Margareta Tolgfors (born 25 January 1967) is a Swedish politician from the Moderate Party. She has been a member of the Riksdag since the 2022 general election.

She was press secretary for the Moderate Party. She was communications director at BAE.

== See also ==
- List of members of the Riksdag, 2022–2026
