= Stockholm riots (1623) =

Riot in Stockholm

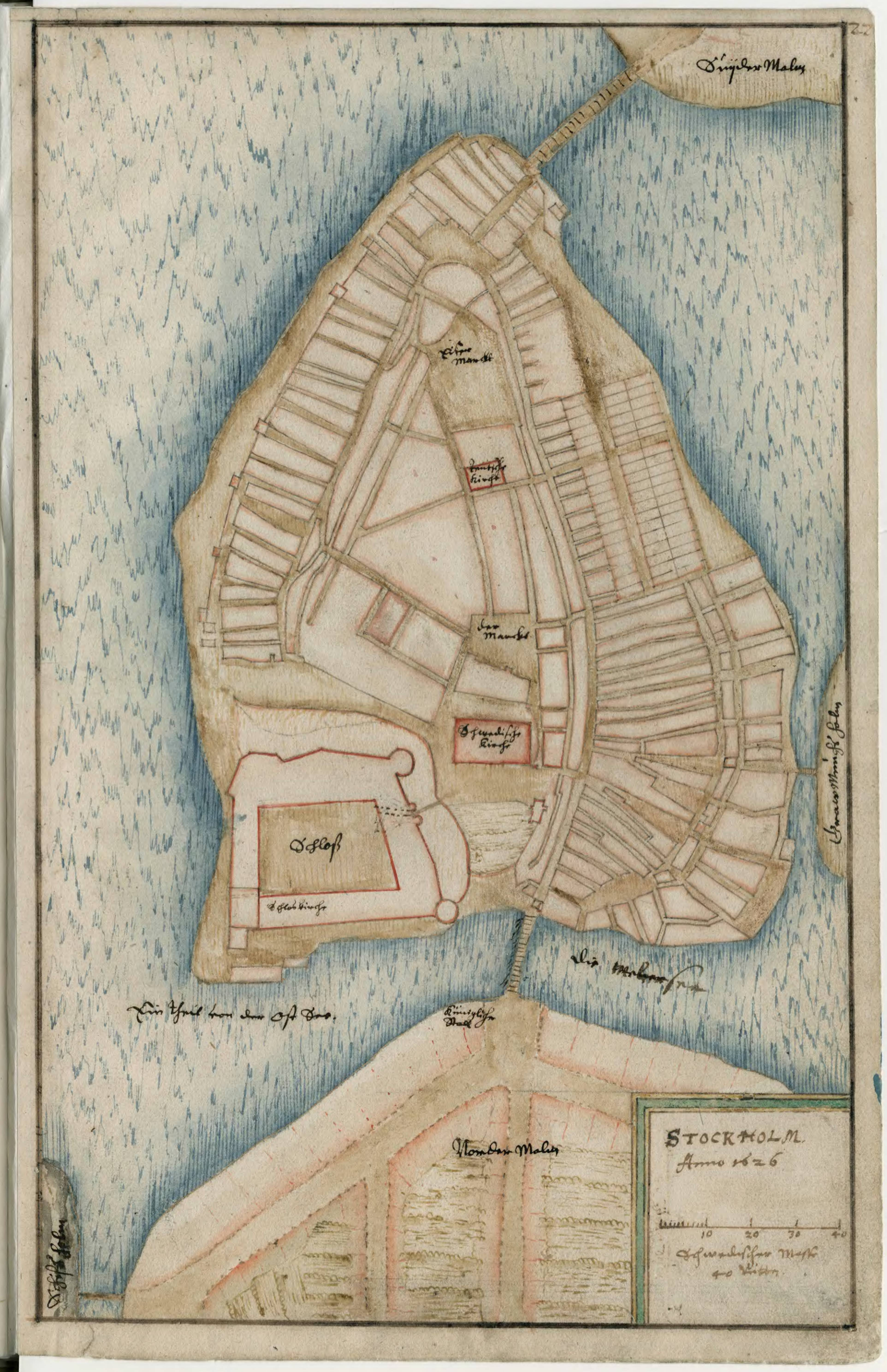
- Hand drawn map of Stockholm from 1626
Date	February 1623
Location	Stockholm, Sweden
Result	Swedish victory

Belligerents
Swedish Empire	(Stockholm) Rioters

Commanders and leaders
(Swedish Empire) Hans Nilsson	(Stockholm) Erik Bengtsson (Stockholm) Store Mats (Stockholm) Sigfrid Mickelsson (Stockholm) Hans Smed

Strength
Unknown	Presumably large

Casualties and losses
Unknown	Several arrested At least 3 executed

The Stockholm riots (1623) were a series of unrests in Stockholm, 1623 as response to the high taxes and conscription by the Swedish Government.

== Background ==
=== Reason behind the riots ===
After a truce in 1623 with Poland–Lithuania during the Polish–Swedish War (1621–1625), Gustavus Adolphus, the king of Sweden, began new recruitment, despite the truce. He was afraid that the peace would not be kept. Many soldiers were lost before they were sent over to the frontlines. Gustavus had also implemented new taxes, which further expanded unrest.

A council member confirmed that these new taxes and conscription were much too detrimental to the country, stating:

"landet [är] så utblottat med folk av dessa 4 skarpa utskrivningar, så att det synes någorlunda vilja luta; och var det ännu ett år eller två skall kontinuera, så må vi väl säga, att vi hava vunnit land av androm, och därutöver ruinerat vårt eget."

Rough translation:

"the country [is] so deprived of people of these 4 sharp conscriptions, that it seems reasonably willing to lean; and should it continue for another year or two, we may well say that we have won the land of others, and, moreover, ruined our own."

=== Rising tensions ===
Rumours of a coming Polish invasion of Sweden furthered the unrest in Stockholm. Everyone who baked, butchered, or brewed, were ordered to report to the crown for calculations of the new taxes. These events eventually culminated in the riots.

== Riots ==
The riots began when Hans Nilsson, who was the crowns overseer, assembled a group of burghers at the Stockholm Court House to hear a proclamation from the authorities. A large group of disgruntled city dwellers assembled, which quickly evolved into a demonstration, and later escalated into what the authorities called "rebellion and mutiny". They began yelling out "Här ut! Här ut!" which is roughly translated to "Out! Out!", this was likely them wanting the one responsible for the taxes to come out to the square. They called him "Pölse Hans, sylte och kårfuemånglare" and other insults. When Hans went out to the square to speak with the demonstrators, he was overwhelmed and restrained.

=== Response from the authorities ===
Towards the evening, the crowd eventually dispersed and Hans was let go. The authorities chose not to intervene, most likely fearing it would only increase the violence. However, the authorities arrested 4 of the people that were accused of starting the riots, Erik Bengtsson, Store Mats, Sigfrid Mickelsson, and Hans Smed. After extensive investigations, they were sentenced to death, but it is unknown if these sentences were actually carried out. 3 other protesters were also later put on trial.

== Aftermath ==
Several of the people arrested were sent to Västerås Castle, where Gustavus Adolphus was residing. The riots were serious, and the king wanted to judge the instigiators of the riot personally. It is speculated of what happened to the arrested, but a Danish diplomat wrote in a contemporary letter telling of a "large riot" in Stockholm, and that 3 people had been sentenced to death and lost their lives.
