= Anders Thornberg =

Swedish politician

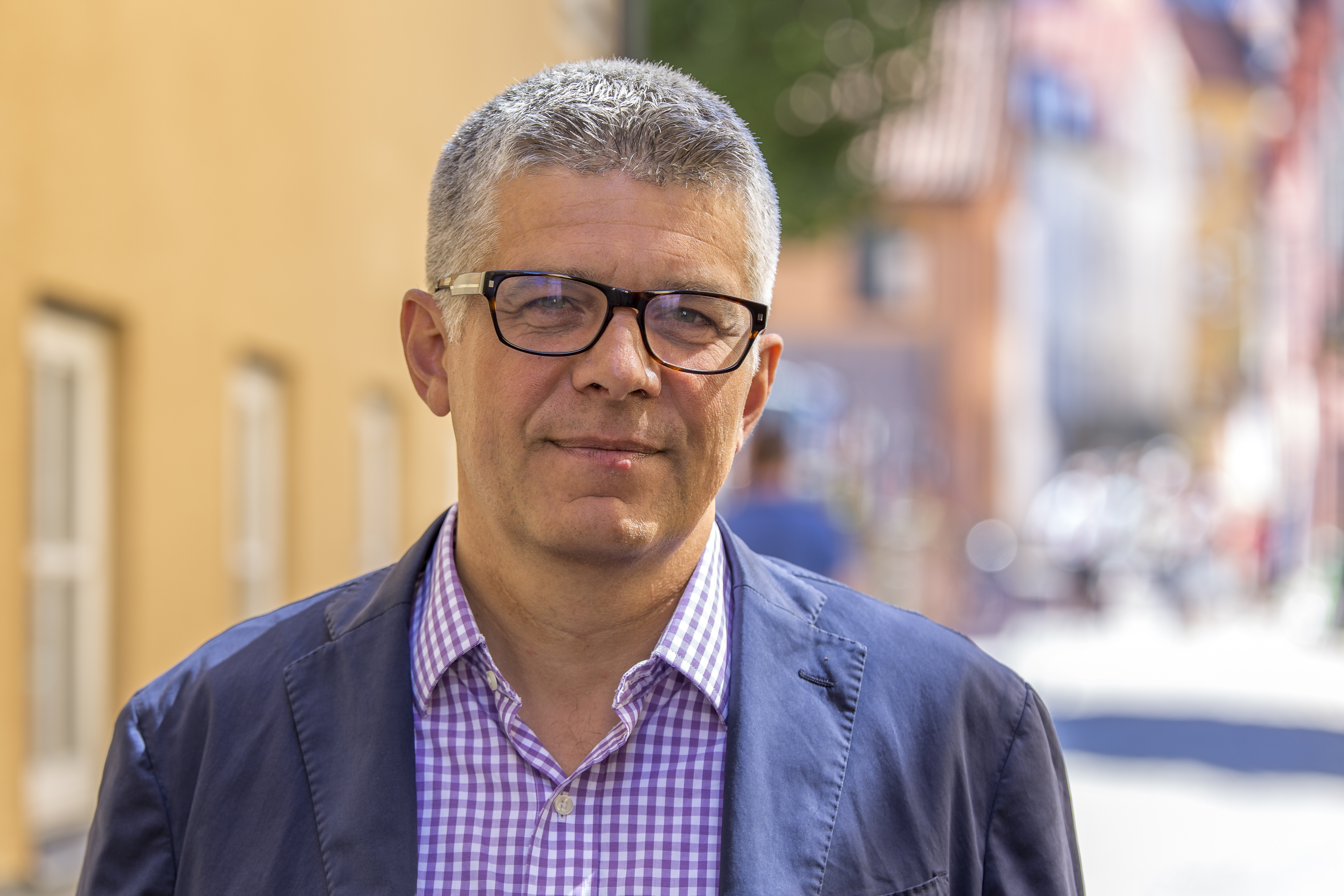

Governor of Halland County
- Incumbent
- Assumed office 1 December 2023
- Monarch: Carl XVI Gustaf
- Prime Minister: Ulf Kristersson
- Preceded by: Brittis Benzler

National Police Commissioner
- In office 15 February 2018 – 1 December 2023
- Preceded by: Dan Eliasson
- Succeeded by: Petra Lundh

Director-General and Head of the Swedish Security Service
- In office July 2012 – 15 February 2018
- Preceded by: Anders Danielsson
- Succeeded by: Klas Friberg

Personal details
- Born: July 25, 1959 (age 67) Halmstad, Halland County, Sweden
- Education: Swedish Police Academy

Bengt Anders Ingvar Thornberg (born 25 July 1959) is a Swedish civil servant who has served as Governor of Halland County since 1 December 2023.

Thornberg previously served as Director-General and Head of the Swedish Security Service (SÄPO) from 2012 to 2018 and as National Police Commissioner from 2018 to 2023.

Civic offices
Preceded by Anders Danielsson	Director-General and Head of the Swedish Security Service; 2012–2018	Succeeded by Klas Friberg
Preceded by Dan Eliasson	National Police Commissioner; 2018–2023	Succeeded by Petra Lundh (designated)
Preceded by Brittis Benzler	Governor of Halland County; 2023–	Incumbent
