= Ingvar Lindell =

Swedish jurist and politician (1904–1993)

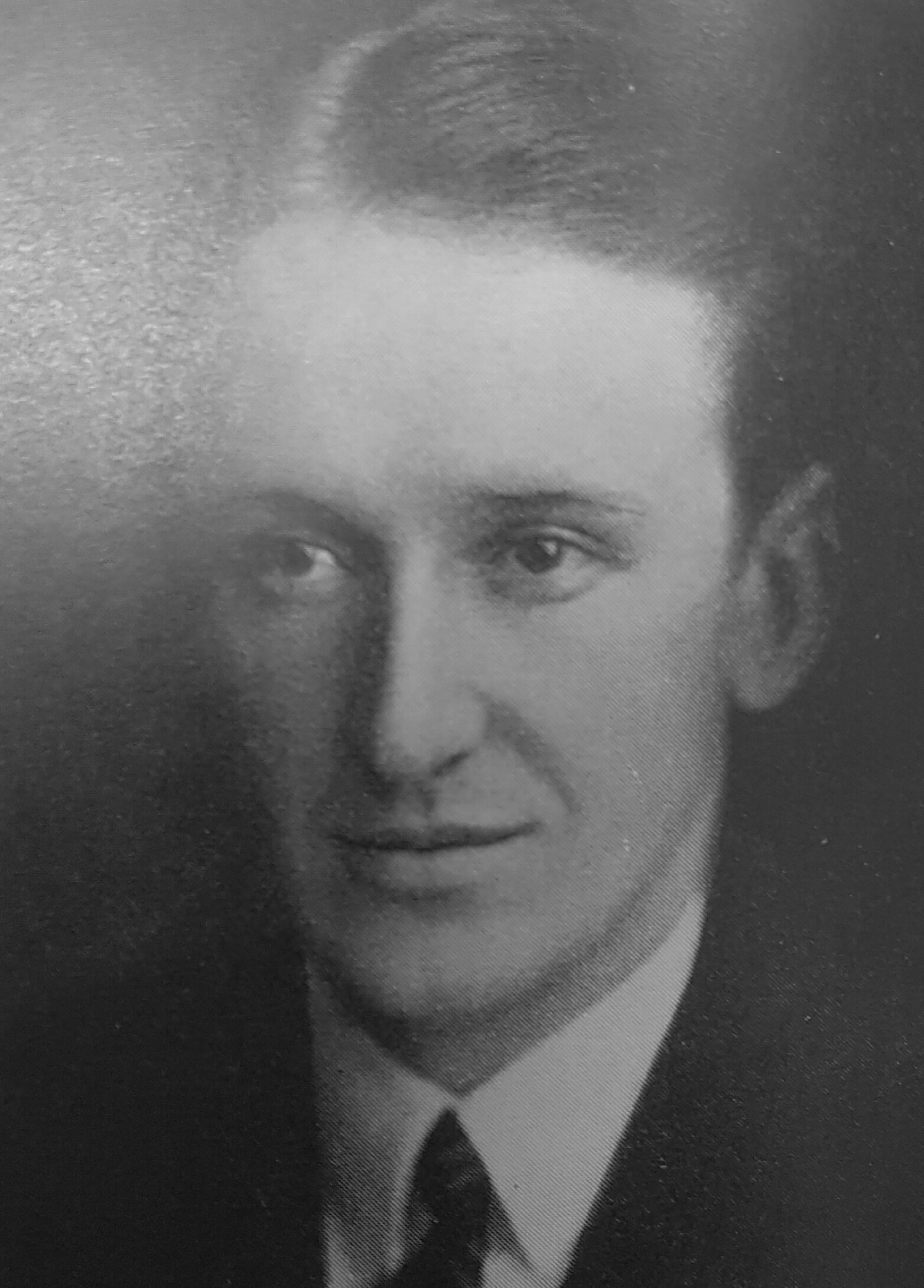

Minister of Justice
- In office 1957–1959

Personal details
- Born: Ingvar Albert Lindell; 1904
- Died: 1993 (aged 88–89)

Ingvar Lindell (1904–1993) was a Swedish civil servant and social democratic politician who served as the minister of justice between 1957 and 1959.

== Biography ==
Lindell was born in 1904. His father was a physician. Lindell was the supreme court judge in the 1940s. Then he assumed various posts in the Swedish cabinet and was named as the minister of justice in 1957, a post which he held until 1959. After leaving the post he was appointed governor of Halland County. Lindell was assigned to examine the female succession to the Swedish throne in 1977.

Lindel was the author of various articles and books. He died in 1993.
