= Swedish Migration Agency =

Swedish administrative authority

- Migrationsverket
- Arms of the Swedish Migration Agency

Agency overview
- Formed: 1 July 1969
- Headquarters: Norrköping
- Minister responsible: Johan Forssell, Minister for Migration and Asylum Policy
- Agency executives: Maria Mindhammar, Director-General; Annika Gottberg, Deputy Director-General
- Parent department: Ministry of Justice
- Key document: Government Instruction: SFS 2019:502
- Website: www.migrationsverket.se

The Swedish Migration Agency (Swedish: Migrationsverket), is a Swedish government agency, established on 1 July 1969. Its task is to evaluate and decide on applications from people who want to seek a temporary residence permit or acquire permanent residence or citizenship in Sweden. This makes it involved in immigration to Sweden

The Swedish Migration Agency is under the Ministry of Justice and operates nationwide from about 40 offices. It is headquartered in Norrköping in Östergötland and is led by a Director General, currently Anders Danielsson. In 2014, the agency received 81,301 applications for asylum, of which 31,220 were granted.

In 2017 according to calculations done by weekly magazine Fokus, the agency's budget for unaccompanied minors alone at 27 billion krona represented 37% of the UNHCR's budget for managing refugees over the entire planet.

== History ==
On 1 July 1969, a new government agency was established: the National Swedish Immigration and Naturalization Board (Swedish: Statens invandrarverk, commonly known as Invandrarverket), which at the time was responsible for both integration and immigration matters. On 10 September 1999, the agency introduced a new name to its employees: Swedish Migration Board (Swedish: Migrationsverket), with the subtitle Sweden’s central authority for alien affairs (Sveriges centrala utlänningsmyndighet). The agency officially adopted the new name the following year. As part of a reorganization in March 2015, its English name was changed to Swedish Migration Agency.

== Criticism ==
Swedish Migration Agency annual expenditure 2007- , 10^{9} SEK
Billion (10^{9}) SEK. Expenditure is Område 8 and Område 13
According to table Redovisning mot anslag
Column Utgifter for each year in the annual reports.

The Swedish Migration Agency has come under criticism for its opaque handling of expatriate work permit applications and inordinate delays coupled with over-zealous, often controversial, readings of Swedish regulations related to insurance requisites for work permit extensions. The Agency continues to process applications with delays extending up to 10 months in some cases.

In May 2016 the Swedish National Board of Forensic Medicine sv: Rättsmedicinalverket (RMV) started aiding the agency with determining the age of migrants claiming to be under 18. The first batch of 518 investigations indicated that 442 were likely adult and the rest retained their status as unaccompanied minors, which gave access to education, better housing and greater likelihood of refugee status. Of the 442, 430 were men and 12 women. RMV was tasked with doing the backlog of 3000 - 14000 age investigations which had been obstructed by Swedish Bar Association lawyers, doctors, dentists and officials of National Board of Health and Welfare.<\ref>

In June 2016 the SMA expressed doubts about 70% of asylum applicants purportedly 15-17.

In July 2018, the agency together with municipalities of Sweden was criticised by the national agency against honor-related crime (Swedish: nationella kompetensteamet mot hedersrelaterat våld och förtryck) for not doing enough to discover and rectify child marriages among migrants.

== See also ==
- Government agencies in Sweden
