= Sten Tolgfors =

Swedish politician

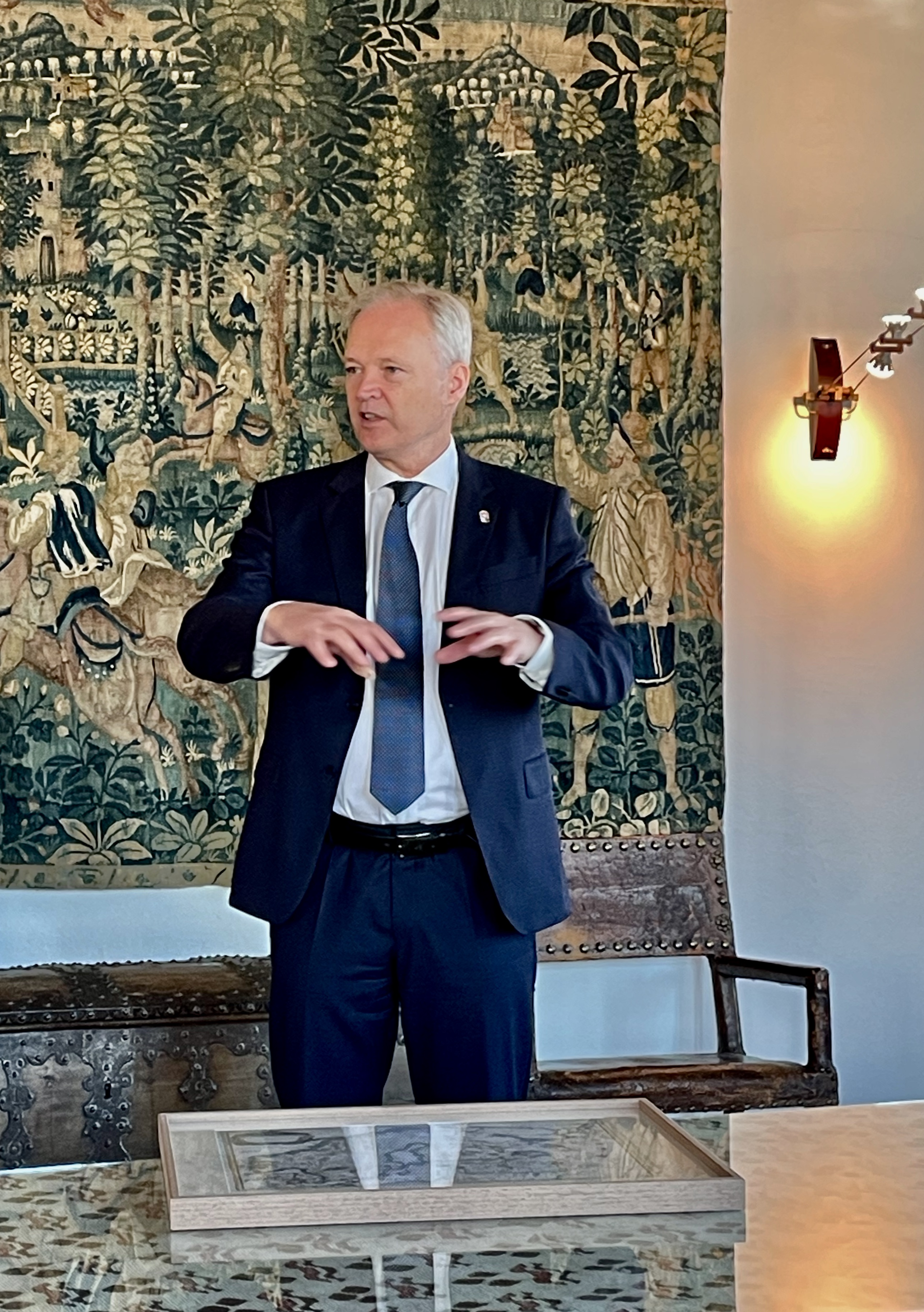
- Sten Tolgfors in a reception at the Torstenson Palace in September 2024

Governor of Västra Götaland
- Incumbent
- Assumed office 1 September 2022
- Monarch: Carl XVI Gustaf
- Prime Minister: Magdalena Andersson; Ulf Kristersson
- Preceded by: Lisbeth Schultze (acting)

Minister for Defence
- In office 5 September 2007 – 29 March 2012
- Prime Minister: Fredrik Reinfeldt
- Preceded by: Mikael Odenberg
- Succeeded by: Catharina Elmsäter-Svärd (acting); Karin Enström

Minister for Foreign Trade
- In office 24 October 2006 – 12 September 2007
- Prime Minister: Fredrik Reinfeldt
- Preceded by: Maria Borelius
- Succeeded by: Ewa Björling

Member of the Riksdag for Örebro County
- In office 3 October 1994 – 31 January 2013
- Succeeded by: Lotta Olsson

Personal details
- Born: 17 July 1966 (age 60) Forshaga, Sweden
- Party: Moderate Party
- Spouse: Katarina Tolgfors
- Education: Örebro University (B.A.)
- Occupation: Politician

Sten Sture Tolgfors (born 17 July 1966) is a Swedish former politician, public affairs executive and government official who is serving as Governor of Västra Götaland County since 1 September 2022, having been appointed to the position on 9 June 2022.

He served as Minister for Foreign Trade 2006-2007 and as Minister for Defence from 2007 until his resignation in 2012. He was a Member of the Swedish Parliament for Örebro County from 1994 to 2013.

== Early life and career ==
Tolgfors was born in Forshaga as the son of Sture and Anna Brita Kajsa Tolgfors but was raised in Åmål. He lives in Örebro with his wife and children. Tolgfors has a B.A. in political science from the University of Örebro, and has a background in the Red Cross.

In local politics he served in the Örebro City Council from 1991 to 1994. He was a political adviser in the Ministry of Defense from 1992 to 1993, and in the Ministry of Enterprise from 1993 to 1994.

He is a conscientious objector, meaning that he refused to carry arms when called to Swedish mandatory military service. He served in the Red Cross instead of doing the military service.

However, he changed his mind completely when he saw a few photos from Saddam Hussein's massacre of Iraqi Kurds.

A survey conducted by Swedish radio news in November 2008 among local party chairman for the four Alliance parties, showed that Tolgfors was the most unpopular minister in the government.

== Political Appointments ==
As a Member of Parliament he has been a member of the Committee on Foreign Affairs and of the Committee on Enterprise from 1994 to 1998.

Since then he has been a member of the Committee on Education from 1998 to 2002, and again from 2003 to 2006.

He was a member of the Committee on Social Insurance from 2002 to 2003.

Since 2003 he has been a member of the executive board of the Moderate Party. From 2002 to 2003 he was the party's refugee policy spokesman and was later the party's education policy representative between 2003 and 2006.

For a short period after the 2006 general election and before his appointment as Minister for Foreign Trade, Tolgfors was chairman of the Committee on Foreign Affairs.

Tolgfors has consistently been involved in bullying issues during his parliamentary period, and considers among other things, that schools should use research-based program that provides proven efficacy.

He has also campaigned in favor of people with disabilities to a school that is tailored to their needs.

== Minister for Foreign Tade ==
On 24 October 2006, Tolgfors was appointed Minister for Foreign Trade, succeeding Maria Borelius.

He left office on 12 September 2007 when he succeeded Mikael Odenberg as Minister for Defence. Odenberg had resigned in protest to the government's defence cuts.

== Minister for Defence ==
Tolgfors completed the transition from invasion to operational defense and among other things, abolished conscription.

He has also brought the Swedish Armed Forces on his policies, and also implemented the reforms (he wanted).

He is the first Minister for Defence who has managed to balance the budget of the Swedish Armed Forces.

He was also the only minister of defence worldwide that was a conscientious objector^{[of what? not clear]} and thus he was not popular among high officers.

=== Resignation ===
Tolgfors received negative attention in March 2012 over the way he dealt with the issue concerning the so-called Project Simoom. Later the same day Tolgfors was registered by Gustav Fridolin to the Constitution Committee on plans for a weapons factory in Saudi Arabia.

A scandal ensued, and on 29 March 2012, Tolgfors resigned.

== Later career ==
Tolgfors submitted his resignation from the Swedish Parliament on 25 January 2013. He left his seat on 31 January 2013 and was succeeded by Lotta Olsson.

Tolgfors quickly moved from his position as a minister to become an arms lobbyist at the public affairs agency Rud Pedersen - with less than six months between his resignation and his new job. As a result Tolgfors drew heavy criticism.

== Honours ==
=== Foreign honours ===
- Romania: Order of Faithful Service, Grand Cross (2008)
- Estonia: Order of the Cross of Terra Mariana, 1st Class (18 January 2011)
- Finland: Grand Cross of the Order of the White Rose of Finland

Political offices
Preceded by Maria Borelius	Minister for Foreign Trade; 2006–2007	Succeeded by Ewa Björling
Preceded by Mikael Odenberg	Minister for Defence; 2007–2012	Succeeded by Catharina Elmsäter-Svärd; Acting
Government offices
Preceded by Lisbeth Schultze acting	Governor of Västra Götaland County; 2022–	Succeeded by
