= Skåne County Northern and Eastern =

Swedish electoral district

- Skåne Läns Norra och Östra
- Constituency for the Riksdag
- Location of Skåne County Northern and Eastern within Sweden
- Municipality: List: Ängelholm; Åstorp; Båstad; Bromölla; Hässleholm; Klippan; Kristianstad; Örkelljunga; Osby; Östra Göinge; Perstorp; Simrishamn; Tomelilla
- County: Skåne
- Population: 322,164 (2025)
- Electorate: 248,840 (2026)
- Area: 6,311 km^{2} (2026)

Current constituency
- Created: 1970
- Seats: List (Note: Constituency seats only.): 10 (1998–present); 11 (1979–1998); 10 (1970–1979)
- Member of the Riksdag: List: Linnea Bengtsson (V); Mikael Eskilandersson (SD); Per-Arne Håkansson (S); Martin Hallander (KD); Lars Johnsson (M); Marianne Littke (L); Daniel Lyckestam (M); Magnus Persson (SD); Ewa Pihl Krabbe (S); Birte Sandberg (C); Björn Söder (SD); Anna Wallentheim (S)
- Created from: Kristianstad County

Skåne County Northern and Eastern (Swedish: Skåne Läns Norra och Östra) is one of the 29 multi-member constituencies of the Riksdag, the national legislature of Sweden. The constituency was established as Kristianstad County (Swedish: Kristianstads Län) in 1970 when the Riksdag was changed from a bicameral legislature to a unicameral legislature. It was renamed Skåne County Northern and Eastern in 1998 when the counties of Kristianstad and Malmöhus were merged to create Skåne. The constituency currently consists of the municipalities of Ängelholm, Åstorp, Båstad, Bromölla, Hässleholm, Klippan, Kristianstad, Örkelljunga, Osby, Östra Göinge, Perstorp, Simrishamn and Tomelilla. The constituency currently elects 10 of the 349 members of the Riksdag using the open party-list proportional representation electoral system. At the 2026 general election it had 248,840 registered electors.

== Electoral system ==
Skåne County Northern and Eastern currently elects 10 of the 349 members of the Riksdag using the open party-list proportional representation electoral system. Constituency seats are allocated using the modified Sainte-Laguë method. Only parties that reach the 4% national threshold and parties that receive at least 12% of the vote in the constituency compete for constituency seats. Supplementary levelling seats may also be allocated at the constituency level to parties that reach the 4% national threshold.

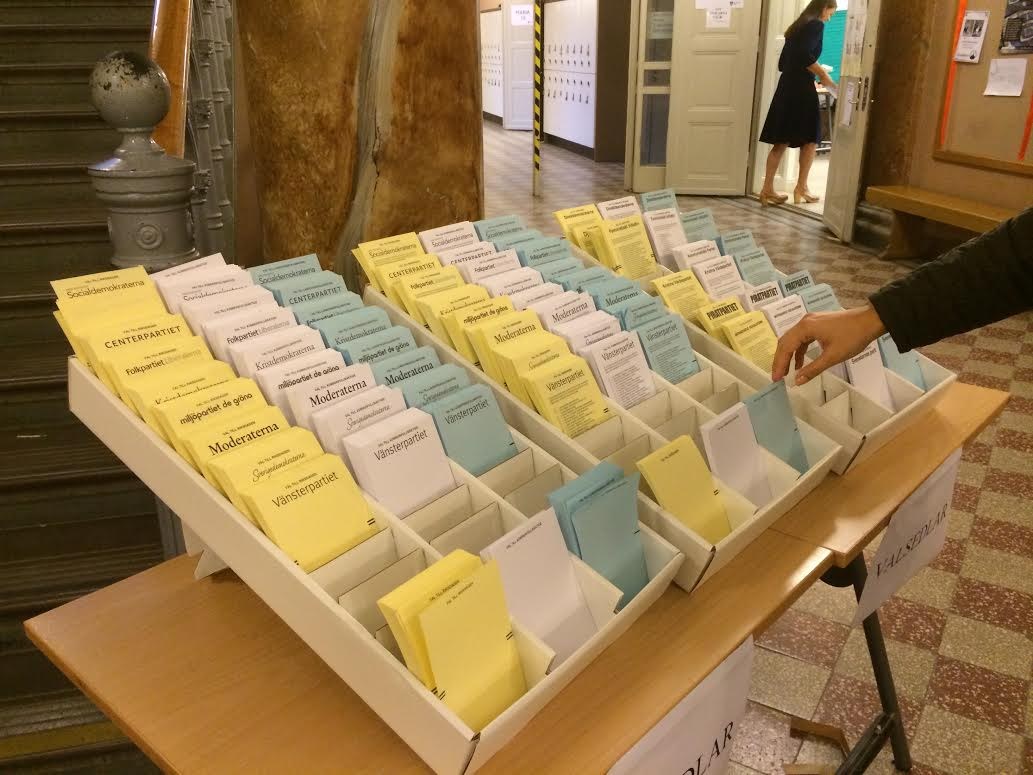
A selection of ballot papers available for voters at the 2014 general election in Stockholm - yellow for the Riksdag, blue for the regional council and white for the municipal council

Prior to 1997 voters could cast any ballot paper they wanted, though it had to contain the name of a party and the name of at least one candidate nominated by that party in the constituency. It was common for parties to hand out ballot papers with their name and list of candidates at the entrance of polling stations. Voters could delete the names of candidates or write-in the names of other candidates but in practice these options weren't used enough by voters to have any significant impact on the results and consequently elections operated as a closed system.

Since 1997, elections in Sweden follow the French model in having separate ballot papers for each party/list in a constituency. There are two ballot papers for each party - a party ballot paper (partivalsedel) with just the name of the party and a name ballot paper (namnvalsedel) with the name of the party and its list of candidates. There are also blank ballot papers (blank valsedel). Voters can initially pick as many ballot papers as they wish and then, in the secrecy of the voting booth, they select a single ballot paper of their choice. If they chose a name ballot paper they have the option of casting a preferential vote for one of their chosen party's candidates. If they chose a blank ballot paper they can write the name of any party including unregistered parties and, optionally, they can write the name of any person as their preferred candidate, even one that does not belong to their chosen party. They then place their chosen ballot paper in an envelope which is placed in the ballot box, discarding all other ballot papers they picked.

Seats won by each party/list in a constituency are allocated to its candidates in order of preference votes (a personal mandate), provided that the candidate has received at least 8% of votes cast for their party in the constituency (5% since January 2011). Any unfilled seats are then allocated to the party's remaining candidates in the order they appear on the party list (a party mandate).

== Election results ==
=== Summary ===
Election	Left V / VPK			Social Democrats S			Greens MP			Centre C			Liberals L / FP / F			Moderates M			Christian Democrats KD / KDS			Sweden Democrats SD		
Election	Votes	%	Seats	Votes	%	Seats	Votes	%	Seats	Votes	%	Seats	Votes	%	Seats	Votes	%	Seats	Votes	%	Seats	Votes	%	Seats
2026	12,279	5.95%	1	47,960	23.24%	3	7,529	3.65%	0	10,953	5.31%	0	11,348	5.50%	0	43,027	20.85%	2	14,154	6.86%	1	56,307	27.28%	3
2022	7,987	3.94%	0	51,154	25.21%	3	6,006	2.96%	0	10,040	4.95%	0	7,625	3.76%	0	39,595	19.52%	2	12,480	6.15%	1	65,345	32.21%	4
2018	8,275	4.09%	0	50,610	24.99%	3	5,816	2.87%	0	13,855	6.84%	1	8,984	4.44%	0	40,881	20.19%	2	13,150	6.49%	1	58,360	28.82%	3
2014	6,083	3.09%	0	58,940	29.96%	3	10,809	5.50%	0	11,815	6.01%	1	8,887	4.52%	0	43,518	22.12%	3	8,131	4.13%	0	43,582	22.16%	3
2010	6,113	3.21%	0	54,529	28.68%	3	10,195	5.36%	0	12,871	6.77%	1	12,677	6.67%	1	60,930	32.04%	4	9,420	4.95%	0	21,312	11.21%	1
2006	6,116	3.42%	0	62,794	35.15%	4	6,051	3.39%	0	14,836	8.30%	1	12,673	7.09%	1	48,946	27.40%	3	11,993	6.71%	1	10,061	5.63%	0
2002	9,498	5.61%	0	66,488	39.24%	5	5,978	3.53%	0	11,960	7.06%	1	19,776	11.67%	1	29,907	17.65%	2	18,664	11.02%	1	4,715	2.78%	0
1998	15,358	9.01%	1	60,415	35.44%	4	6,298	3.69%	0	10,988	6.45%	1	6,738	3.95%	0	43,078	25.27%	3	22,651	13.29%	1			
1994	6,474	3.49%	0	83,839	45.23%	6	7,622	4.11%	0	18,028	9.72%	1	9,632	5.20%	1	46,581	25.13%	3	7,580	4.09%	0			
1991	4,083	2.22%	0	64,166	34.91%	4	4,570	2.49%	0	18,881	10.27%	1	13,010	7.08%	1	44,869	24.41%	3	13,613	7.41%	1			
1988	4,934	2.75%	0	76,572	42.70%	5	9,259	5.16%	0	26,112	14.56%	2	19,003	10.60%	1	38,130	21.26%	3	4,599	2.56%	0			
1985	4,490	2.41%	0	78,251	41.93%	5	2,289	1.23%	0	30,246	16.21%	2	25,135	13.47%	1	45,791	24.54%	3	with C					
1982	4,342	2.31%	0	78,781	41.97%	5	2,752	1.47%	0	36,730	19.57%	2	11,686	6.23%	1	49,796	26.53%	3	3,047	1.62%	0			
1979	4,055	2.20%	0	72,836	39.50%	5				40,065	21.73%	2	20,149	10.93%	1	43,462	23.57%	3	2,380	1.29%	0			
1976	3,294	1.80%	0	71,596	39.13%	4				55,041	30.08%	3	19,184	10.49%	1	30,818	16.84%	2	2,526	1.38%	0			
1973	3,678	2.13%	0	70,631	40.94%	4				55,526	32.18%	3	14,405	8.35%	1	25,161	14.58%	2	2,922	1.69%	0			
1970	3,042	1.83%	0	71,081	42.69%	4				42,345	25.43%	3	24,261	14.57%	2	21,931	13.17%	1	3,749	2.25%	0			

(Excludes levelling seats. Figures in italics represent alliances/joint lists.)

=== Detailed ===
Party has received at least 4% of the vote nationally and is entitled to compete for constituency seats.

==== 2020s ====
===== 2026 =====
Results of the 2026 general election held on 13 September 2026:

Party		Votes per municipality													Total votes	%	Seats		
Party		Ängel- holm	Åstorp	Båstad	Brom- ölla	Hässle- holm	Klippan	Kristian- stad	Örkell- junga	Osby	Östra Göinge	Pers- torp	Simris- hamn	Tome- lilla	Total votes	%	Con.	Lev.	Tot.
Sweden Democrats	SD	7,299	2,969	2,221	2,798	9,267	3,892	13,303	2,235	2,524	2,681	1,402	2,901	2,815	56,307	27.28%	3	0	3
Swedish Social Democratic Party	S	6,985	2,464	2,003	2,006	7,469	2,253	13,698	1,201	2,036	2,094	1,027	2,904	1,820	47,960	23.24%	3	0	3
Moderate Party	M	7,490	1,585	2,981	1,457	6,207	1,832	12,288	1,034	1,461	1,784	632	2,609	1,667	43,027	20.85%	2	0	2
Christian Democrats	KD	2,225	507	961	491	2,481	763	3,255	758	621	507	242	839	504	14,154	6.86%	1	0	1
Left Party	V	1,137	699	343	423	2,124	519	4,365	253	344	501	299	764	508	12,279	5.95%	1	0	1
Liberals	L	1,652	317	925	335	1,810	422	3,569	239	362	340	131	877	369	11,348	5.50%	0	1	1
Centre Party	C	1,903	281	1,060	221	1,788	433	2,597	289	344	378	157	952	550	10,953	5.31%	0	1	1
Green Party	MP	1,178	198	599	168	1,142	330	1,800	136	260	210	83	1,010	415	7,529	3.65%	0	0	0
Örebro Party	ÖP	87	38	36	58	162	74	218	47	38	43	8	53	43	905	0.44%	0	0	0
Alternative for Sweden	AfS	93	48	56	47	159	51	181	36	31	40	26	32	40	840	0.41%	0	0	0
Christian Values Party	KrVP	33	5	14	9	68	1	55	57	13	15	0	5	1	276	0.13%	0	0	0
Ambition Sweden	AS	53	6	18	11	49	9	34	4	11	5	4	23	15	242	0.12%	0	0	0
Pirate Party	PP	20	4	5	8	33	7	57	8	2	2	4	11	5	166	0.08%	0	0	0
Human Rights and Democracy	MoD	25	0	8	13	39	7	17	7	2	0	4	7	9	138	0.07%	0	0	0
Citizens' Coalition	MED	17	1	3	3	14	4	24	3	8	6	2	13	7	105	0.05%	0	0	0
Communist Party of Sweden	SKP	7	3	2	0	3	2	12	3	0	7	2	4	3	48	0.02%	0	0	0
United Voice	ER	0	0	0	1	9	0	6	3	3	2	1	3	1	29	0.01%	0	0	0
Direct Democrats	DD	3	0	0	1	4	0	2	1	0	0	1	1	1	14	0.01%	0	0	0
Nordic Resistance Movement	NMR	2	2	0	0	1	2	2	0	0	2	0	0	2	13	0.01%	0	0	0
Turning Point Party	PV	0	0	0	0	1	0	6	0	1	0	0	1	0	9	0.00%	0	0	0
Volt Sweden	Volt	1	0	0	0	2	0	5	1	0	0	0	0	0	9	0.00%	0	0	0
The Push Buttons	Kn	0	0	0	1	1	0	3	0	1	0	0	2	0	8	0.00%	0	0	0
Unity	ENH	2	0	1	0	1	0	3	0	0	0	0	1	0	8	0.00%	0	0	0
Classical Liberal Party	KLP	0	0	0	1	1	0	0	0	1	0	0	2	1	6	0.00%	0	0	0
Communist Party	K	0	0	0	2	0	0	2	0	1	0	0	0	0	5	0.00%	0	0	0
Independent Rural Party	LPo	0	0	1	0	1	2	0	0	1	0	0	0	0	5	0.00%	0	0	0
Star Party Sweden		0	0	0	0	0	1	0	1	0	0	0	0	0	2	0.00%	0	0	0
99 Black Balloons		1	0	0	0	0	0	0	0	0	0	0	0	0	1	0.00%	0	0	0
A Good Sweden		0	0	0	0	0	0	1	0	0	0	0	0	0	1	0.00%	0	0	0
AI Party		0	0	1	0	0	0	0	0	0	0	0	0	0	1	0.00%	0	0	0
Alternative Truth		0	0	1	0	0	0	0	0	0	0	0	0	0	1	0.00%	0	0	0
Anti-Authoritarian Action Party		0	0	0	0	0	0	1	0	0	0	0	0	0	1	0.00%	0	0	0
Donald Duck Party		0	0	0	0	0	0	0	0	1	0	0	0	0	1	0.00%	0	0	0
Evil Chicken Party	OKP	0	0	0	0	0	0	0	0	0	0	1	0	0	1	0.00%	0	0	0
Nuance Party	Pny	0	0	0	0	0	0	1	0	0	0	0	0	0	1	0.00%	0	0	0
Party for Justice and Equality	PRJ	0	0	0	0	1	0	0	0	0	0	0	0	0	1	0.00%	0	0	0
Proxy Party		0	0	1	0	0	0	0	0	0	0	0	0	0	1	0.00%	0	0	0
RegleraAI.nu		0	0	0	1	0	0	0	0	0	0	0	0	0	1	0.00%	0	0	0
Security Party	TRP	0	0	0	0	0	0	1	0	0	0	0	0	0	1	0.00%	0	0	0
Socialist Party		0	0	0	0	0	0	0	0	0	0	0	0	1	1	0.00%	0	0	0
Sweden's National Democratic Party	SNDP	1	0	0	0	0	0	0	0	0	0	0	0	0	1	0.00%	0	0	0
Valid votes		30,214	9,127	11,240	8,055	32,837	10,604	55,506	6,316	8,066	8,617	4,026	13,014	8,777	206,399	100.00%	10	2	12
Blank votes		306	74	70	123	319	123	480	62	84	98	41	141	138	2,059	0.99%			
Rejected votes – unregistered parties		5	5	2	1	7	0	1	0	0	0	2	2	1	26	0.01%			
Rejected votes – other		20	6	10	2	33	7	45	9	6	7	3	6	10	164	0.08%			
Total polled		30,545	9,212	11,322	8,181	33,196	10,734	56,032	6,387	8,156	8,722	4,072	13,163	8,926	208,648	83.85%			
Registered electors		35,402	11,600	12,980	9,756	39,888	13,206	66,675	7,719	9,766	10,408	5,211	15,620	10,609	248,840				
Turnout		86.28%	79.41%	87.23%	83.86%	83.22%	81.28%	84.04%	82.74%	83.51%	83.80%	78.14%	84.27%	84.14%	83.85%				

The following candidates were elected:

- Constituency seats (personal mandates) - Linnea Bengtsson (V), 1,126 votes; and Maria Malmer Stenergard (M), 3,600 votes.
- Constituency seats (party mandates) - Mikael Eskilandersson (SD), 95 votes; Per-Arne Håkansson (S), 575 votes; Martin Hallander (KD), 20 votes; Daniel Lyckestam (M), 1,433 votes; Magnus Persson (SD), 78 votes; Ewa Pihl Krabbe (S), 815 votes; Björn Söder (SD), 123 votes; and Anna Wallentheim (S), 2,114 votes.
- Levelling seats (party mandates) - Marianne Littke (L), 211 votes; and Birte Sandberg (C), 277 votes.

===== 2022 =====
Results of the 2022 general election held on 11 September 2022:

Party		Votes per municipality													Total votes	%	Seats		
Party		Ängel- holm	Åstorp	Båstad	Brom- ölla	Hässle- holm	Klippan	Kristian- stad	Örkell- junga	Osby	Östra Göinge	Pers- torp	Simris- hamn	Tome- lilla	Total votes	%	Con.	Lev.	Tot.
Sweden Democrats	SD	8,107	3,315	2,690	3,127	10,970	4,250	15,485	2,486	3,004	3,349	1,648	3,659	3,255	65,345	32.21%	4	0	4
Swedish Social Democratic Party	S	7,447	2,457	2,258	2,261	8,028	2,498	13,870	1,367	2,242	2,242	1,069	3,379	2,036	51,154	25.21%	3	0	3
Moderate Party	M	6,615	1,456	2,810	1,283	5,764	1,651	11,771	900	1,307	1,528	586	2,440	1,484	39,595	19.52%	2	0	2
Christian Democrats	KD	1,808	434	747	414	2,232	697	2,955	712	539	541	223	700	478	12,480	6.15%	1	0	1
Centre Party	C	1,667	284	832	191	1,641	432	2,498	277	392	384	164	772	506	10,040	4.95%	0	0	0
Left Party	V	889	343	286	267	1,528	369	2,409	160	286	284	155	665	346	7,987	3.94%	0	0	0
Liberals	L	1,120	182	678	214	1,154	229	2,602	156	191	192	80	599	228	7,625	3.76%	0	0	0
Green Party	MP	970	123	461	143	920	243	1,426	141	210	176	68	815	310	6,006	2.96%	0	0	0
Nuance Party	PNy	16	36	10	9	54	29	360	15	5	29	4	37	2	606	0.30%	0	0	0
Alternative for Sweden	AfS	69	31	29	22	100	48	151	16	22	30	6	43	25	592	0.29%	0	0	0
Citizens' Coalition	MED	51	11	18	5	57	19	62	11	19	6	7	27	13	306	0.15%	0	0	0
Pirate Party	PP	42	4	13	16	39	13	59	6	2	1	5	13	15	228	0.11%	0	0	0
Christian Values Party	KrVP	21	2	10	13	39	3	18	44	12	18	2	7	4	193	0.10%	0	0	0
The Push Buttons	Kn	32	6	13	12	12	11	28	16	5	0	5	13	11	164	0.08%	0	0	0
Human Rights and Democracy	MoD	26	1	11	3	20	16	30	8	1	3	1	24	9	153	0.08%	0	0	0
Climate Alliance	KA	10	0	6	1	6	5	14	0	0	0	0	29	4	75	0.04%	0	0	0
Feminist Initiative	FI	8	1	2	3	12	8	16	1	1	3	2	4	3	64	0.03%	0	0	0
Independent Rural Party	LPo	6	0	4	0	8	5	14	2	6	4	2	1	7	59	0.03%	0	0	0
Communist Party of Sweden	SKP	6	7	2	2	6	3	26	0	0	1	0	0	3	56	0.03%	0	0	0
Nordic Resistance Movement	NMR	1	4	1	2	3	9	6	5	1	3	0	2	3	40	0.02%	0	0	0
Direct Democrats	DD	3	1	1	0	12	1	6	5	2	0	1	1	1	34	0.02%	0	0	0
Turning Point Party	PV	0	0	0	0	7	0	15	0	0	1	0	2	0	25	0.01%	0	0	0
Sweden Out of the EU/ Free Justice Party	FRP	1	5	0	1	5	2	0	0	0	0	3	0	0	17	0.01%	0	0	0
Unity	ENH	3	0	0	0	0	0	0	0	0	0	0	6	6	15	0.01%	0	0	0
Basic Income Party	BASIP	1	1	0	0	2	0	7	2	0	0	0	0	0	13	0.01%	0	0	0
Classical Liberal Party	KLP	0	0	0	0	1	0	2	0	0	3	0	0	0	6	0.00%	0	0	0
Scania Party	SKÅ	1	0	0	0	0	3	0	0	0	0	0	0	1	5	0.00%	0	0	0
Hard Line Sweden		0	0	1	0	1	0	0	1	1	0	0	0	0	4	0.00%	0	0	0
Evil Chicken Party	OKP	0	0	0	0	0	0	0	0	0	1	0	0	0	1	0.00%	0	0	0
Socialist Welfare Party	S-V	0	0	0	0	0	0	1	0	0	0	0	0	0	1	0.00%	0	0	0
Volt Sweden	Volt	0	0	0	0	0	0	1	0	0	0	0	0	0	1	0.00%	0	0	0
Valid votes		28,920	8,704	10,883	7,989	32,621	10,544	53,832	6,331	8,248	8,799	4,031	13,238	8,750	202,890	100.00%	10	0	10
Blank votes		295	92	90	105	358	128	484	68	117	75	30	148	134	2,124	1.04%			
Rejected votes – unregistered parties		1	1	0	3	8	2	4	1	3	3	5	0	1	32	0.02%			
Rejected votes – other		17	4	3	4	32	4	23	7	3	7	7	3	8	122	0.06%			
Total polled		29,233	8,801	10,976	8,101	33,019	10,678	54,343	6,407	8,371	8,884	4,073	13,389	8,893	205,168	83.92%			
Registered electors		34,038	11,089	12,600	9,567	39,480	12,988	65,373	7,651	9,888	10,574	5,143	15,679	10,419	244,489				
Turnout		85.88%	79.37%	87.11%	84.68%	83.63%	82.21%	83.13%	83.74%	84.66%	84.02%	79.20%	85.39%	85.35%	83.92%				

The following candidates were elected:

- Constituency seats (personal mandates) - Maria Malmer Stenergard (M), 2,188 votes.
- Constituency seats (party mandates) - Torsten Elofsson (KD), 27 votes; Mikael Eskilandersson (SD), 110 votes; Per-Arne Håkansson (S), 501 votes; Thomas Morell (SD), 32 votes; Magnus Persson (SD), 87 votes; Ewa Pihl Krabbe (S), 779 votes; Björn Söder (SD), 167 votes; Anna Wallentheim (S), 2,249 votes; and Hans Wallmark (M), 894 votes.

Permanent substitutions:

- Hans Wallmark (M) resigned on 20 August 2024 and was replaced by Lars Johnsson (M) on the same day.

==== 2010s ====
===== 2018 =====
Results of the 2018 general election held on 9 September 2018:

Party		Votes per municipality													Total votes	%	Seats		
Party		Ängel- holm	Åstorp	Båstad	Brom- ölla	Hässle- holm	Klippan	Kristian- stad	Örkell- junga	Osby	Östra Göinge	Pers- torp	Simris- hamn	Tome- lilla	Total votes	%	Con.	Lev.	Tot.
Sweden Democrats	SD	6,819	3,004	2,224	3,116	9,708	3,860	14,275	2,200	2,615	2,913	1,456	3,310	2,860	58,360	28.82%	3	0	3
Swedish Social Democratic Party	S	6,276	2,546	1,703	2,528	8,504	2,547	14,132	1,288	2,363	2,418	1,210	3,099	1,996	50,610	24.99%	3	0	3
Moderate Party	M	7,113	1,504	2,949	1,091	6,013	1,657	11,761	954	1,353	1,587	660	2,712	1,527	40,881	20.19%	2	0	2
Centre Party	C	2,274	409	1,178	267	2,302	612	3,159	416	613	517	208	1,085	815	13,855	6.84%	1	0	1
Christian Democrats	KD	2,067	407	885	373	2,419	711	2,996	751	611	509	220	799	402	13,150	6.49%	1	0	1
Liberals	L	1,315	257	560	282	1,380	326	3,324	165	204	211	99	607	254	8,984	4.44%	0	1	1
Left Party	V	1,046	340	337	276	1,521	423	2,223	180	330	333	137	761	368	8,275	4.09%	0	0	0
Green Party	MP	895	149	410	133	1,034	237	1,504	145	189	180	81	606	253	5,816	2.87%	0	0	0
Feminist Initiative	FI	74	20	28	19	111	26	129	10	9	17	10	125	45	623	0.31%	0	0	0
Alternative for Sweden	AfS	61	39	29	20	108	61	123	29	30	26	13	38	36	613	0.30%	0	0	0
Citizens' Coalition	MED	45	6	12	8	48	10	87	8	15	5	5	21	11	281	0.14%	0	0	0
Pirate Party	PP	38	12	4	7	54	22	50	5	4	9	7	15	6	233	0.12%	0	0	0
Animals' Party	DjuP	39	3	11	1	17	3	44	9	1	8	10	14	5	165	0.08%	0	0	0
Unity	ENH	30	3	9	4	22	9	34	1	9	3	2	26	7	159	0.08%	0	0	0
Direct Democrats	DD	15	9	6	6	22	4	41	4	7	6	6	8	6	140	0.07%	0	0	0
Independent Rural Party	LPo	11	3	11	6	31	13	22	4	22	1	2	4	10	140	0.07%	0	0	0
Nordic Resistance Movement	NMR	2	6	4	7	11	6	19	5	5	0	0	6	7	78	0.04%	0	0	0
Christian Values Party	KrVP	1	0	0	6	14	0	10	16	5	0	0	1	3	56	0.03%	0	0	0
Classical Liberal Party	KLP	3	0	0	1	6	0	12	0	0	1	0	0	1	24	0.01%	0	0	0
Basic Income Party	BASIP	2	0	1	0	0	3	4	0	0	0	0	3	0	13	0.01%	0	0	0
Communist Party of Sweden	SKP	1	0	0	0	1	0	4	0	0	2	0	0	1	9	0.00%	0	0	0
Security Party	TRP	1	2	0	0	3	1	0	0	0	0	0	1	1	9	0.00%	0	0	0
Initiative	INI	0	0	0	0	0	0	1	2	0	1	0	2	1	7	0.00%	0	0	0
Scania Party	SKÅ	1	0	0	0	0	4	0	0	0	0	0	0	0	5	0.00%	0	0	0
European Workers Party	EAP	0	0	1	0	0	0	0	0	0	0	0	0	1	2	0.00%	0	0	0
Parties not on the ballot	ÖVR	5	0	0	0	5	0	3	0	0	0	0	0	1	14	0.01%	0	0	0
Valid votes		28,134	8,719	10,362	8,151	33,334	10,535	53,957	6,192	8,385	8,747	4,126	13,243	8,617	202,502	100.00%	10	1	11
Blank votes		269	79	95	102	361	140	489	59	87	117	50	139	132	2,119	1.03%			
Rejected votes – unregistered parties		4	4	5	2	14	2	22	0	2	4	2	4	4	69	0.03%			
Rejected votes – other		11	5	3	4	18	8	31	2	3	10	2	6	5	108	0.05%			
Total polled		28,418	8,807	10,465	8,259	33,727	10,685	54,499	6,253	8,477	8,878	4,180	13,392	8,758	204,798	86.35%			
Registered electors		32,502	10,692	11,774	9,387	38,988	12,689	63,119	7,333	9,741	10,252	5,099	15,447	10,155	237,178				
Turnout		87.43%	82.37%	88.88%	87.98%	86.51%	84.21%	86.34%	85.27%	87.02%	86.60%	81.98%	86.70%	86.24%	86.35%				

The following candidates were elected:

- Constituency seats (personal mandates) - Sofia Nilsson (C), 985 votes.
- Constituency seats (party mandates) - Mikael Eskilandersson (SD), 117 votes; Per-Arne Håkansson (S), 535 votes; Annelie Karlsson (S), 2,439 votes; Maria Malmer Stenergard (M), 1,677 votes; Christina Östberg (SD), 2 votes; Tuve Skånberg (KD), 506 votes; Björn Söder (SD), 181 votes; Anna Wallentheim (S), 1,023 votes; and Hans Wallmark (M), 1,902 votes.
- Levelling seats (personal mandates) - Christer Nylander (L), 650 votes.

===== 2014 =====
Results of the 2014 general election held on 14 September 2014:

Party		Votes per municipality													Total votes	%	Seats		
Party		Ängel- holm	Åstorp	Båstad	Brom- ölla	Hässle- holm	Klippan	Kristian- stad	Örkell- junga	Osby	Östra Göinge	Pers- torp	Simris- hamn	Tome- lilla	Total votes	%	Con.	Lev.	Tot.
Swedish Social Democratic Party	S	7,112	3,236	1,835	3,041	9,754	3,392	15,452	1,700	2,904	3,168	1,549	3,413	2,384	58,940	29.96%	3	0	3
Sweden Democrats	SD	4,722	2,017	1,492	2,282	7,653	2,581	11,127	1,615	2,094	2,305	1,055	2,512	2,127	43,582	22.16%	3	0	3
Moderate Party	M	7,932	1,484	3,497	1,231	6,204	1,923	11,650	1,099	1,331	1,454	727	3,284	1,702	43,518	22.12%	3	0	3
Centre Party	C	1,659	335	1,018	242	1,980	531	2,687	366	488	511	203	995	800	11,815	6.01%	1	0	1
Green Party	MP	1,603	324	635	335	2,260	386	3,073	229	350	328	175	761	350	10,809	5.50%	0	1	1
Liberal People's Party	FP	1,251	263	619	238	1,255	281	3,331	185	219	273	128	593	251	8,887	4.52%	0	1	1
Christian Democrats	KD	1,255	270	544	170	1,674	409	1,697	600	401	327	116	475	193	8,131	4.13%	0	1	1
Left Party	V	734	260	217	364	1,011	346	1,606	143	282	293	136	473	218	6,083	3.09%	0	0	0
Feminist Initiative	FI	427	89	169	84	578	135	830	51	97	113	41	512	202	3,328	1.69%	0	0	0
Pirate Party	PP	89	29	31	18	113	32	181	22	23	29	18	33	29	647	0.33%	0	0	0
Swedish Senior Citizen Interest Party	SPI	4	4	0	0	11	0	73	20	0	4	0	9	47	172	0.09%	0	0	0
Unity	ENH	25	3	5	6	12	7	40	7	10	10	8	16	7	156	0.08%	0	0	0
Party of the Swedes	SVP	12	20	11	2	24	14	31	5	4	4	4	9	6	146	0.07%	0	0	0
Independent Rural Party	LBPo	7	0	2	1	36	18	7	1	23	8	2	1	6	112	0.06%	0	0	0
Animals' Party	DjuP	16	5	4	3	13	3	23	1	5	8	1	3	1	86	0.04%	0	0	0
Christian Values Party	KrVP	8	3	0	7	15	0	17	21	5	3	0	0	0	79	0.04%	0	0	0
Progressive Party		2	4	2	1	4	3	8	2	6	9	1	0	0	42	0.02%	0	0	0
Classical Liberal Party	KLP	2	2	0	0	6	2	9	0	1	3	0	1	0	26	0.01%	0	0	0
Direct Democrats		8	1	1	2	7	1	3	0	0	0	0	1	1	25	0.01%	0	0	0
Communist Party of Sweden	SKP	1	0	0	0	0	7	2	0	0	0	0	1	0	11	0.01%	0	0	0
Socialist Justice Party	RS	0	0	0	0	0	1	2	0	0	0	2	0	0	5	0.00%	0	0	0
Health Party		1	0	0	0	0	0	2	1	0	0	0	0	0	4	0.00%	0	0	0
Scania Party	SKÅ	0	0	0	0	2	1	0	0	1	0	0	0	0	4	0.00%	0	0	0
New Party		0	0	0	0	3	0	0	0	0	0	0	0	0	3	0.00%	0	0	0
European Workers Party	EAP	0	0	0	0	1	0	0	0	0	0	0	0	0	1	0.00%	0	0	0
Parties not on the ballot		12	11	4	2	17	4	21	3	0	5	5	2	2	88	0.04%	0	0	0
Valid votes		26,882	8,360	10,086	8,029	32,633	10,077	51,872	6,071	8,244	8,855	4,171	13,094	8,326	196,700	100.00%	10	3	13
Blank votes		290	91	82	89	426	133	556	57	98	83	46	128	117	2,196	1.10%			
Rejected votes – other		8	4	1	1	13	3	19	2	6	2	3	4	2	68	0.03%			
Total polled		27,180	8,455	10,169	8,119	33,072	10,213	52,447	6,130	8,348	8,940	4,220	13,226	8,445	198,964	84.61%			
Registered electors		31,705	10,550	11,702	9,465	38,871	12,476	61,995	7,342	9,759	10,457	5,222	15,594	10,009	235,147				
Turnout		85.73%	80.14%	86.90%	85.78%	85.08%	81.86%	84.60%	83.49%	85.54%	85.49%	80.81%	84.81%	84.37%	84.61%				

The following candidates were elected:

- Constituency seats (personal mandates) - Per-Ingvar Johnsson (C), 1,045 votes.
- Constituency seats (party mandates) - Anette Åkesson (M), 797 votes; Linus Bylund (SD), 14 votes; Kent Ekeroth (SD), 73 votes; Per-Arne Håkansson (S), 751 votes; Annelie Karlsson (S), 2,627 votes; Maria Malmer Stenergard (M), 1,332 votes; Johan Nissinen (SD), 0 votes; Anna Wallentheim (S), 1,329 votes; and Hans Wallmark (M), 2,042 votes.
- Levelling seats (personal mandates) - Gustav Fridolin (MP), 2,725 votes; Christer Nylander (FP), 599 votes; and Tuve Skånberg (KD), 646 votes.

===== 2010 =====
Results of the 2010 general election held on 19 September 2010:

Party		Votes per municipality													Total votes	%	Seats		
Party		Ängel- holm	Åstorp	Båstad	Brom- ölla	Hässle- holm	Klippan	Kristian- stad	Örkell- junga	Osby	Östra Göinge	Pers- torp	Simris- hamn	Tome- lilla	Total votes	%	Con.	Lev.	Tot.
Moderate Party	M	10,421	2,345	4,308	1,758	9,248	2,978	15,864	1,687	1,949	2,142	1,141	4,620	2,469	60,930	32.04%	4	0	4
Swedish Social Democratic Party	S	5,783	3,113	1,493	3,230	9,004	3,078	14,385	1,471	2,742	3,150	1,445	3,381	2,254	54,529	28.68%	3	0	3
Sweden Democrats	SD	1,955	964	549	1,210	4,103	1,184	5,948	710	1,021	1,188	448	967	1,065	21,312	11.21%	1	0	1
Centre Party	C	1,658	355	1,185	276	2,542	552	2,711	377	724	534	228	948	781	12,871	6.77%	1	0	1
Liberal People's Party	FP	1,670	384	722	428	1,877	496	4,519	336	378	519	205	785	358	12,677	6.67%	1	0	1
Green Party	MP	1,533	313	538	310	1,919	358	2,755	236	425	370	175	873	390	10,195	5.36%	0	1	1
Christian Democrats	KD	1,494	306	702	223	1,857	506	1,893	661	437	359	162	592	228	9,420	4.95%	0	1	1
Left Party	V	685	222	183	364	1,023	389	1,677	170	240	299	190	432	239	6,113	3.21%	0	0	0
Pirate Party	PP	111	41	46	30	154	62	233	39	30	38	14	50	27	875	0.46%	0	0	0
Swedish Senior Citizen Interest Party	SPI	203	22	20	1	38	19	40	37	0	2	37	16	105	540	0.28%	0	0	0
Feminist Initiative	FI	61	9	18	18	64	7	168	4	4	32	6	93	30	514	0.27%	0	0	0
Freedom Party		2	0	2	0	2	0	9	0	1	3	1	8	0	28	0.01%	0	0	0
National Democrats	ND	3	6	0	1	0	4	3	1	5	1	0	1	1	26	0.01%	0	0	0
Unity	ENH	3	1	1	0	1	2	9	2	0	0	0	1	0	20	0.01%	0	0	0
Party of the Swedes	SVP	1	3	0	1	2	2	6	0	0	1	0	0	0	16	0.01%	0	0	0
Classical Liberal Party	KLP	2	0	0	0	2	5	0	0	0	1	0	1	0	11	0.01%	0	0	0
Swedish National Democratic Party	SNDP	0	0	0	0	0	1	5	0	2	0	1	1	1	11	0.01%	0	0	0
Communist Party of Sweden	SKP	0	0	0	2	0	2	0	0	0	1	0	0	0	5	0.00%	0	0	0
Rural Democrats		0	0	0	0	0	0	0	0	1	2	0	1	0	4	0.00%	0	0	0
Socialist Justice Party	RS	1	0	0	0	0	0	1	0	0	2	0	0	0	4	0.00%	0	0	0
Spirits Party		0	0	0	0	1	1	1	0	1	0	0	0	0	4	0.00%	0	0	0
Active Democracy		0	0	0	0	0	0	3	0	0	0	0	0	0	3	0.00%	0	0	0
Scania Party	SKÅ	0	1	0	0	0	1	1	0	0	0	0	0	0	3	0.00%	0	0	0
European Workers Party	EAP	0	0	0	0	1	0	0	0	0	0	0	0	1	2	0.00%	0	0	0
Nordic Union		0	0	0	0	0	0	0	1	0	0	0	0	0	1	0.00%	0	0	0
Norrland Coalition Party	NorrS	0	0	0	0	1	0	0	0	0	0	0	0	0	1	0.00%	0	0	0
Parties not on the ballot		5	3	2	1	7	6	8	2	2	1	0	0	2	39	0.02%	0	0	0
Valid votes		25,591	8,088	9,769	7,853	31,846	9,653	50,239	5,734	7,962	8,645	4,053	12,770	7,951	190,154	100.00%	10	2	12
Blank votes		376	105	125	106	393	146	651	87	112	151	54	167	140	2,613	1.35%			
Rejected votes – other		7	11	1	32	11	1	24	4	8	5	1	6	2	113	0.06%			
Total polled		25,974	8,204	9,895	7,991	32,250	9,800	50,914	5,825	8,082	8,801	4,108	12,943	8,093	192,880	83.04%			
Registered electors		31,033	10,311	11,599	9,481	38,526	12,239	60,631	7,237	9,702	10,531	5,169	15,738	10,076	232,273				
Turnout		83.70%	79.57%	85.31%	84.28%	83.71%	80.07%	83.97%	80.49%	83.30%	83.57%	79.47%	82.24%	80.32%	83.04%				

The following candidates were elected:

- Constituency seats (personal mandates) - Per-Ingvar Johnsson (C), 1,288 votes.
- Constituency seats (party mandates) - Christer Adelsbo (S), 832 votes; Christer Akej (M), 1,199 votes; Kerstin Engle (S), 969 votes; Annelie Karlsson (S), 2,263 votes; Mattias Karlsson (SD), 36 votes; Göran Montan (M), 883 votes; Christer Nylander (FP), 907 votes; Margareta Pålsson (M), 1,970 votes; and Hans Wallmark (M), 3,238 votes.
- Levelling seats (personal mandates) - Gustav Fridolin (MP), 1,804 votes; and Tuve Skånberg (KD), 1,194 votes.

Permanent substitutions:

- Margareta Pålsson (M) resigned on 31 August 2012 and was replaced by Anette Åkesson (M) on 1 September 2012.

==== 2000s ====
===== 2006 =====
Results of the 2006 general election held on 17 September 2006:

Party		Votes per municipality													Total votes	%	Seats		
Party		Ängel- holm	Åstorp	Båstad	Brom- ölla	Hässle- holm	Klippan	Kristian- stad	Örkell- junga	Osby	Östra Göinge	Pers- torp	Simris- hamn	Tome- lilla	Total votes	%	Con.	Lev.	Tot.
Swedish Social Democratic Party	S	6,666	3,354	1,704	3,851	10,302	3,482	17,039	1,631	3,259	3,785	1,591	3,672	2,458	62,794	35.15%	4	0	4
Moderate Party	M	8,684	1,734	3,908	1,180	7,445	2,457	12,347	1,455	1,465	1,527	913	3,752	2,079	48,946	27.40%	3	0	3
Centre Party	C	1,718	425	1,191	347	2,783	660	3,506	428	757	676	278	1,181	886	14,836	8.30%	1	0	1
Liberal People's Party	FP	1,741	376	720	406	1,785	489	4,580	331	420	471	216	745	393	12,673	7.09%	1	0	1
Christian Democrats	KD	1,791	370	782	335	2,538	590	2,218	763	592	574	224	817	399	11,993	6.71%	1	0	1
Sweden Democrats	SD	1,141	625	336	549	1,895	681	2,040	411	493	485	237	536	632	10,061	5.63%	0	0	0
Left Party	V	666	215	165	429	997	264	1,754	131	314	301	211	425	244	6,116	3.42%	0	0	0
Green Party	MP	896	133	349	173	1,094	232	1,737	106	221	219	66	580	245	6,051	3.39%	0	0	0
Swedish Senior Citizen Interest Party	SPI	605	65	68	32	123	80	584	158	26	47	100	18	30	1,936	1.08%	0	0	0
Pirate Party	PP	128	56	37	45	163	28	293	33	17	49	20	75	56	1,000	0.56%	0	0	0
Feminist Initiative	FI	92	27	40	26	190	35	313	19	34	35	16	127	40	994	0.56%	0	0	0
June List	JL	70	17	29	28	91	30	198	17	31	35	11	66	41	664	0.37%	0	0	0
Health Care Party	Sjvåp	21	1	2	7	25	1	22	1	1	3	2	146	13	245	0.14%	0	0	0
Unity	ENH	22	1	9	3	3	45	13	1	1	1	1	6	2	108	0.06%	0	0	0
National Socialist Front	NSF	3	4	1	6	13	4	43	2	0	5	0	0	2	83	0.05%	0	0	0
National Democrats	ND	2	1	1	5	9	6	7	1	3	3	1	2	1	42	0.02%	0	0	0
New Future	NYF	10	1	0	0	1	2	1	3	0	14	0	0	0	32	0.02%	0	0	0
People's Will		0	5	4	0	0	2	2	1	0	2	0	0	0	16	0.01%	0	0	0
Communist Party of Sweden	SKP	1	0	0	0	0	0	1	1	1	0	0	2	0	6	0.00%	0	0	0
Nordic Union		0	0	0	0	0	0	0	5	0	0	0	0	0	5	0.00%	0	0	0
Socialist Justice Party	RS	1	0	0	3	1	0	0	0	0	0	0	0	0	5	0.00%	0	0	0
Unique Party		0	0	0	0	3	0	1	0	0	0	1	0	0	5	0.00%	0	0	0
Classical Liberal Party	KLP	0	0	2	0	1	0	0	0	0	0	0	0	1	4	0.00%	0	0	0
Active Democracy		0	0	0	0	0	0	1	0	0	0	0	0	0	1	0.00%	0	0	0
European Workers Party	EAP	0	0	0	0	0	0	0	0	0	0	0	0	1	1	0.00%	0	0	0
Parties not on the ballot		13	1	1	1	6	2	8	2	3	1	2	5	2	47	0.03%	0	0	0
Valid votes		24,271	7,411	9,349	7,426	29,468	9,090	46,708	5,500	7,638	8,233	3,890	12,155	7,525	178,664	100.00%	10	0	10
Blank votes		471	151	143	183	551	191	1,071	101	136	211	58	251	152	3,670	2.01%			
Rejected votes – other		3	7	5	3	11	3	16	0	4	3	0	5	2	62	0.03%			
Total polled		24,745	7,569	9,497	7,612	30,030	9,284	47,795	5,601	7,778	8,447	3,948	12,411	7,679	182,396	80.05%			
Registered electors		30,221	9,873	11,487	9,361	37,806	12,146	58,804	7,149	9,710	10,527	5,207	15,591	9,964	227,846				
Turnout		81.88%	76.66%	82.68%	81.32%	79.43%	76.44%	81.28%	78.35%	80.10%	80.24%	75.82%	79.60%	77.07%	80.05%				

The following candidates were elected:

- Constituency seats (personal mandates) - Lars-Ivar Ericson (C), 1,238 votes; and Alf Svensson (KD), 2,142 votes.
- Constituency seats (party mandates) - Christer Adelsbo (S), 973 votes; Kerstin Engle (S), 842 votes; Ylva Johansson (S), 1,891 votes; Göran Montan (M), 961 votes; Christer Nylander (FP), 1,051 votes; Margareta Pålsson (M), 2,081 votes; Göran Persson (S), 2,422 votes; and Hans Wallmark (M), 3,038 votes.

Permanent substitutions:

- Lars-Ivar Ericson (C) resigned on 31 January 2009 and was replaced by Gunnel Wallin (C) on 1 February 2009.
- Alf Svensson (KD) resigned on 13 July 2009 and was replaced by Michael Anefur (KD) on 14 July 2009.

===== 2002 =====
Results of the 2002 general election held on 15 September 2002:

Party		Votes per municipality													Total votes	%	Seats		
Party		Ängel- holm	Åstorp	Båstad	Brom- ölla	Hässle- holm	Klippan	Kristian- stad	Örkell- junga	Osby	Östra Göinge	Pers- torp	Simris- hamn	Tome- lilla	Total votes	%	Con.	Lev.	Tot.
Swedish Social Democratic Party	S	7,186	3,241	1,879	3,993	10,911	3,444	18,489	1,659	3,443	3,945	1,589	4,116	2,593	66,488	39.24%	5	0	5
Moderate Party	M	5,425	1,218	2,386	659	4,293	1,609	7,423	922	813	1,007	584	2,290	1,278	29,907	17.65%	2	0	2
Liberal People's Party	FP	3,072	585	1,354	545	2,975	791	6,238	521	621	628	399	1,375	672	19,776	11.67%	1	0	1
Christian Democrats	KD	2,792	664	1,314	498	3,693	1,001	4,031	1,108	857	753	345	1,050	558	18,664	11.02%	1	0	1
Centre Party	C	1,314	303	996	270	2,506	622	2,188	379	685	560	266	1,037	834	11,960	7.06%	1	0	1
Left Party	V	913	360	271	619	1,578	386	2,627	193	541	589	285	770	366	9,498	5.61%	0	1	1
Green Party	MP	849	149	318	207	1,148	227	1,680	130	242	274	80	453	221	5,978	3.53%	0	0	0
Sweden Democrats	SD	526	260	224	239	981	228	1,013	154	225	167	64	290	344	4,715	2.78%	0	0	0
Swedish Senior Citizen Interest Party	SPI	403	23	37	6	103	37	430	69	12	43	77	124	26	1,390	0.82%	0	0	0
Scania Party	SKÅ	37	29	3	20	78	29	134	7	23	12	10	26	29	437	0.26%	0	0	0
New Future	NYF	1	0	0	17	49	4	61	3	14	30	2	1	2	184	0.11%	0	0	0
Unity	ENH	8	2	2	1	1	39	3	0	0	0	1	0	0	57	0.03%	0	0	0
Skåne Federalists		0	0	0	0	2	0	10	0	0	0	0	0	0	12	0.01%	0	0	0
The Communists	KOMM	0	0	0	0	3	0	2	2	2	1	1	0	0	11	0.01%	0	0	0
Socialist Party	SOC.P	0	0	0	0	1	0	1	0	0	1	0	2	0	5	0.00%	0	0	0
European Workers Party	EAP	0	0	0	0	0	0	1	0	0	0	0	0	1	2	0.00%	0	0	0
Blank Voters Party		0	0	0	0	0	0	1	0	0	0	0	0	0	1	0.00%	0	0	0
Socialist Justice Party	RS	1	0	0	0	0	0	0	0	0	0	0	0	0	1	0.00%	0	0	0
Other parties	ÖVR	32	21	15	6	23	79	69	34	12	28	2	8	6	335	0.20%	0	0	0
Valid votes		22,559	6,855	8,799	7,080	28,345	8,496	44,401	5,181	7,490	8,038	3,705	11,542	6,930	169,421	100.00%	10	1	11
Rejected votes		548	134	178	119	455	235	877	107	154	161	77	219	190	3,454	2.00%			
Total polled		23,107	6,989	8,977	7,199	28,800	8,731	45,278	5,288	7,644	8,199	3,782	11,761	7,120	172,875	77.61%			
Registered electors		29,207	9,422	11,250	9,235	37,040	11,843	57,350	7,047	9,803	10,477	5,045	15,362	9,657	222,738				
Turnout		79.11%	74.18%	79.80%	77.95%	77.75%	73.72%	78.95%	75.04%	77.98%	78.26%	74.97%	76.56%	73.73%	77.61%				

The following candidates were elected:

- Constituency seats (personal mandates) - Lars-Ivar Ericson (C), 1,020 votes; and Bo Lundgren (M), 6,864 votes.
- Constituency seats (party mandates) - Christer Adelsbo (S), 1,900 votes; Anders Bengtsson (S), 1,031 votes; Kerstin Engle (S), 1,182 votes; Christer Nylander (FP), 1,361 votes; Margareta Pålsson (M), 904 votes; Göran Persson (S), 2,281 votes; Tuve Skånberg (KD), 1,387 votes; and Ulla Wester (S), 1,429 votes.
- Levelling seats (party mandates) - Sven-Erik Sjöstrand (V), 427 votes.

Permanent substitutions:

- Bo Lundgren (M) resigned on 30 September 2004 and was replaced by Maud Ekendahl (M) on 1 October 2004.

==== 1990s ====
===== 1998 =====
Results of the 1998 general election held on 20 September 1998:

Party		Votes per municipality													Total votes	%	Seats		
Party		Ängel- holm	Åstorp	Båstad	Brom- ölla	Hässle- holm	Klippan	Kristian- stad	Örkell- junga	Osby	Östra Göinge	Pers- torp	Simris- hamn	Tome- lilla	Total votes	%	Con.	Lev.	Tot.
Swedish Social Democratic Party	S	6,026	3,133	1,636	3,712	9,997	3,080	16,774	1,449	3,339	3,927	1,427	3,534	2,381	60,415	35.44%	4	0	4
Moderate Party	M	7,286	1,646	3,329	963	6,333	2,406	11,046	1,379	1,330	1,355	880	3,337	1,788	43,078	25.27%	3	0	3
Christian Democrats	KD	3,348	739	1,553	547	4,402	1,213	4,948	1,169	962	920	452	1,548	850	22,651	13.29%	1	1	2
Left Party	V	1,495	690	382	1,133	2,782	735	3,836	357	837	983	448	1,137	543	15,358	9.01%	1	0	1
Centre Party	C	1,316	270	957	239	2,420	530	1,927	389	609	473	203	879	776	10,988	6.45%	1	0	1
Liberal People's Party	FP	1,007	214	472	205	982	293	2,074	238	261	228	145	407	212	6,738	3.95%	0	1	1
Green Party	MP	762	170	322	236	1,216	256	1,729	148	320	309	94	481	255	6,298	3.69%	0	0	0
Other parties		734	191	239	145	893	297	1,214	176	131	139	210	344	210	4,923	2.89%	0	0	0
Valid votes		21,974	7,053	8,890	7,180	29,025	8,810	43,548	5,305	7,789	8,334	3,859	11,667	7,015	170,449	100.00%	10	2	12
Rejected votes		566	162	188	211	707	273	1,282	135	215	232	86	359	237	4,653	2.66%			
Total polled		22,540	7,215	9,078	7,391	29,732	9,083	44,830	5,440	8,004	8,566	3,945	12,026	7,252	175,102	79.08%			
Registered electors		28,196	9,297	11,142	9,203	37,437	12,026	56,191	7,044	9,932	10,789	5,124	15,441	9,593	221,415				
Turnout		79.94%	77.61%	81.48%	80.31%	79.42%	75.53%	79.78%	77.23%	80.59%	79.40%	76.99%	77.88%	75.60%	79.08%				

The following candidates were elected:

- Constituency seats (personal mandates) - Bo Lundgren (M), 9,139 votes; and Gunnel Wallin (C), 1,507 votes.
- Constituency seats (party mandates) - Johnny Ahlqvist (S), 3,001 votes; Anders Andersson (KD), 5 votes; Maud Ekendahl (M), 1,104 votes; Ingvar Eriksson (M), 671 votes; Kaj Larsson (S), 876 votes; Sven-Erik Sjöstrand (V), 647 votes; Ingegerd Wärnersson (S), 1,784 votes; and Ulla Wester (S), 1,120 votes.
- Levelling seats (personal mandates) - Siw Persson (FP), 1,797 votes; and Tuve Skånberg (KD), 1,831 votes.

Permanent substitutions:

- Anders Andersson (KD) resigned on 5 October 1998 and was replaced by Margareta Viklund (KD) on 6 October 1998.
- Johnny Ahlqvist (S) resigned on 31 July 2000 and was replaced by Marianne Jönsson (Note: Shown as Marianne Nilsson on the Riksdag website) (S) on 1 August 2000.
- Ingegerd Wärnersson (S) resigned on 30 January 2002 and was replaced by Anders Bengtsson (S) on 31 January 2002.

===== 1994 =====
Results of the 1994 general election held on 18 September 1994:

Party		Votes per municipality													Total votes	%	Seats		
Party		Ängel- holm	Åstorp	Båstad	Brom- ölla	Hässle- holm	Klippan	Kristian- stad	Örkell- junga	Osby	Östra Göinge	Pers- torp	Simris- hamn	Tome- lilla	Total votes	%	Con.	Lev.	Tot.
Swedish Social Democratic Party	S	7,910	4,329	2,089	5,143	13,858	4,544	23,056	1,983	4,463	5,408	2,184	5,579	3,293	83,839	45.23%	6	0	6
Moderate Party	M	8,123	1,765	3,674	944	7,070	2,620	11,522	1,608	1,536	1,495	951	3,310	1,963	46,581	25.13%	3	0	3
Centre Party	C	2,219	534	1,559	381	3,689	1,018	3,192	723	933	751	407	1,472	1,150	18,028	9.72%	1	0	1
Liberal People's Party	FP	1,320	271	612	310	1,631	397	2,985	256	386	359	217	588	300	9,632	5.20%	1	0	1
Green Party	MP	981	226	412	348	1,506	340	1,882	226	378	368	142	528	285	7,622	4.11%	0	0	0
Christian Democratic Unity	KDS	980	259	414	210	1,716	327	1,555	574	447	377	157	366	198	7,580	4.09%	0	1	1
Left Party	V	694	222	143	552	1,129	301	1,642	121	324	434	192	515	205	6,474	3.49%	0	0	0
New Democracy	NyD	397	151	200	93	465	192	573	106	88	113	50	272	138	2,838	1.53%	0	0	0
Other parties		242	45	64	53	471	136	854	91	69	66	50	272	373	2,786	1.50%	0	0	0
Valid votes		22,866	7,802	9,167	8,034	31,535	9,875	47,261	5,688	8,624	9,371	4,350	12,902	7,905	185,380	100.00%	11	1	12
Rejected votes		422	92	134	127	547	201	838	114	145	142	60	222	136	3,180	1.69%			
Total polled		23,288	7,894	9,301	8,161	32,082	10,076	48,099	5,802	8,769	9,513	4,410	13,124	8,041	188,560	85.22%			
Registered electors		27,283	9,249	10,797	9,278	37,888	12,116	55,845	7,022	10,167	10,996	5,232	15,729	9,666	221,268				
Turnout		85.36%	85.35%	86.14%	87.96%	84.68%	83.16%	86.13%	82.63%	86.25%	86.51%	84.29%	83.44%	83.19%	85.22%				

The following candidates were elected: Johnny Ahlqvist (S); Ingvar Eriksson (M); Marianne Jönsson (S); Wiggo Komstedt (M); Kaj Larsson (S); Bo Lundgren (M); Börje Nilsson (S); Bengt Harding Olson (FP); Karl Erik Olsson (C); Ulla Rudin (S); Tuve Skånberg (KDS); and Ingegerd Wärnersson (S).

Permanent substitutions:

- Wiggo Komstedt (M) resigned on 2 October 1995 and was replaced by Maud Ekendahl (M) on 3 October 1995.
- Karl Erik Olsson (C) resigned on 9 October 1995 and was replaced by Ingbritt Irhammar (C) on 10 October 1995.
- Ingbritt Irhammar (C) resigned on 30 April 1998 and was replaced by Gunnel Wallin (C) on 1 May 1998.

===== 1991 =====
Results of the 1991 general election held on 15 September 1991:

Party		Votes per municipality													Total votes	%	Seats		
Party		Ängel- holm	Åstorp	Båstad	Brom- ölla	Hässle- holm	Klippan	Kristian- stad	Örkell- junga	Osby	Östra Göinge	Pers- torp	Simris- hamn	Tome- lilla	Total votes	%	Con.	Lev.	Tot.
Swedish Social Democratic Party	S	5,536	3,104	1,486	4,432	10,454	3,329	17,803	1,329	3,547	4,545	1,694	4,456	2,451	64,166	34.91%	4	0	4
Moderate Party	M	7,337	2,016	3,288	1,004	7,017	2,569	11,462	1,634	1,363	1,384	935	3,180	1,680	44,869	24.41%	3	0	3
Centre Party	C	2,168	562	1,543	422	3,958	1,125	3,470	714	1,035	846	438	1,444	1,156	18,881	10.27%	1	0	1
New Democracy	NyD	2,171	597	882	541	2,477	859	3,663	533	866	774	381	878	587	15,209	8.28%	1	0	1
Christian Democratic Unity	KDS	1,715	509	682	312	3,058	674	2,861	882	785	647	341	781	366	13,613	7.41%	1	0	1
Liberal People's Party	FP	1,786	414	776	422	2,056	608	4,018	396	494	485	307	860	388	13,010	7.08%	1	0	1
Green Party	MP	629	111	265	191	796	235	1,162	146	211	176	86	381	181	4,570	2.49%	0	0	0
Left Party	V	374	130	71	364	702	228	1,107	66	265	303	83	272	118	4,083	2.22%	0	0	0
Other parties		401	256	84	121	1,135	317	970	149	120	202	133	681	813	5,382	2.93%	0	0	0
Valid votes		22,117	7,699	9,077	7,809	31,653	9,944	46,516	5,849	8,686	9,362	4,398	12,933	7,740	183,783	100.00%	11	0	11
Rejected votes		388	103	126	197	510	227	889	93	154	158	94	211	143	3,293	1.76%			
Total polled		22,505	7,802	9,203	8,006	32,163	10,171	47,405	5,942	8,840	9,520	4,492	13,144	7,883	187,076	85.38%			
Registered electors		26,121	9,131	10,540	9,267	37,317	12,362	55,304	7,008	10,315	11,033	5,297	15,782	9,627	219,104				
Turnout		86.16%	85.45%	87.31%	86.39%	86.19%	82.28%	85.72%	84.79%	85.70%	86.29%	84.80%	83.28%	81.88%	85.38%				

The following candidates were elected: Johnny Ahlqvist (S); Kenneth Attefors (NyD); Maja Bäckström (S); Ingvar Eriksson (M); Wiggo Komstedt (M); Kaj Larsson (S); Bo Lundgren (M); Börje Nilsson (S); Bengt Harding Olson (FP); Karl Erik Olsson (C); and Tuve Skånberg (KDS).

==== 1980s ====
===== 1988 =====
Results of the 1988 general election held on 18 September 1988:

Party		Votes per municipality													Total votes	%	Seats		
Party		Ängel- holm	Åstorp	Båstad	Brom- ölla	Hässle- holm	Klippan	Kristian- stad	Örkell- junga	Osby	Östra Göinge	Pers- torp	Simris- hamn	Tome- lilla	Total votes	%	Con.	Lev.	Tot.
Swedish Social Democratic Party	S	6,776	3,781	1,799	4,977	12,592	4,173	21,205	1,622	4,088	5,185	2,067	5,359	2,948	76,572	42.70%	5	0	5
Moderate Party	M	6,387	1,543	2,731	759	6,130	2,114	9,208	1,530	1,286	1,122	840	2,826	1,654	38,130	21.26%	3	0	3
Centre Party	C	3,015	794	2,017	523	5,489	1,527	4,834	1,024	1,386	1,070	561	2,057	1,815	26,112	14.56%	2	0	2
Liberal People's Party	FP	2,385	622	1,151	536	3,121	997	5,724	634	782	801	450	1,218	582	19,003	10.60%	1	0	1
Green Party	MP	1,247	291	500	363	1,590	519	2,442	278	402	398	212	662	355	9,259	5.16%	0	1	1
Left Party – Communists	VPK	442	188	82	384	904	280	1,409	79	306	350	88	293	129	4,934	2.75%	0	0	0
Christian Democratic Unity	KDS	442	149	151	98	1,241	197	888	365	356	291	113	183	125	4,599	2.56%	0	0	0
Other parties		58	46	31	9	140	47	101	24	26	27	57	110	27	703	0.39%	0	0	0
Valid votes		20,752	7,414	8,462	7,649	31,207	9,854	45,811	5,556	8,632	9,244	4,388	12,708	7,635	179,312	100.00%	11	1	12
Rejected votes		367	95	120	114	376	170	593	94	102	125	62	176	132	2,526	1.39%			
Total polled		21,119	7,509	8,582	7,763	31,583	10,024	46,404	5,650	8,734	9,369	4,450	12,884	7,767	181,838	84.69%			
Registered electors		24,805	8,965	9,904	8,981	37,049	12,197	54,300	6,853	10,340	10,935	5,277	15,630	9,469	214,705				
Turnout		85.14%	83.76%	86.65%	86.44%	85.25%	82.18%	85.46%	82.45%	84.47%	85.68%	84.33%	82.43%	82.03%	84.69%				

The following candidates were elected: Johnny Ahlqvist (S); Maja Bäckström (S); Ingvar Eriksson (M); Ingbritt Irhammar (C); Wiggo Komstedt (M); Kaj Larsson (S); Bo Lundgren (M); Börje Nilsson (S); Kaj Nilsson (MP); Bengt Harding Olson (FP); Karl Erik Olsson (C); and Ingegerd Wärnersson (S).

===== 1985 =====
Results of the 1985 general election held on 15 September 1985:

Party		Votes per municipality													Total votes	%	Seats		
Party		Ängel- holm	Åstorp	Båstad	Brom- ölla	Hässle- holm	Klippan	Kristian- stad	Örkell- junga	Osby	Östra Göinge	Pers- torp	Simris- hamn	Tome- lilla	Total votes	%	Con.	Lev.	Tot.
Swedish Social Democratic Party	S	6,797	3,927	1,660	5,013	12,759	4,493	21,684	1,732	4,306	5,342	2,164	5,413	2,961	78,251	41.93%	5	0	5
Moderate Party	M	7,024	1,824	3,117	959	7,498	2,677	11,218	1,860	1,579	1,490	1,056	3,484	2,005	45,791	24.54%	3	0	3
Centre Party	C	3,195	868	2,091	579	6,579	1,757	5,557	1,414	1,749	1,400	685	2,259	2,113	30,246	16.21%	2	0	2
Liberal People's Party	FP	3,116	845	1,424	790	4,373	1,226	7,036	810	1,144	1,041	549	1,865	916	25,135	13.47%	1	1	2
Left Party – Communists	VPK	405	179	96	392	829	183	1,270	45	270	338	123	240	120	4,490	2.41%	0	0	0
Green Party	MP	333	39	157	64	392	135	624	55	93	67	34	213	83	2,289	1.23%	0	0	0
Other parties		30	46	34	10	66	17	80	5	15	22	15	78	14	432	0.23%	0	0	0
Valid votes		20,900	7,728	8,579	7,807	32,496	10,488	47,469	5,921	9,156	9,700	4,626	13,552	8,212	186,634	100.00%	11	1	12
Rejected votes		223	81	61	63	260	118	443	57	60	90	45	115	83	1,699	0.90%			
Total polled		21,123	7,809	8,640	7,870	32,756	10,606	47,912	5,978	9,216	9,790	4,671	13,667	8,295	188,333	88.88%			
Registered electors		23,738	8,727	9,594	8,727	36,721	12,103	53,472	6,820	10,371	10,922	5,221	15,869	9,604	211,889				
Turnout		88.98%	89.48%	90.06%	90.18%	89.20%	87.63%	89.60%	87.65%	88.86%	89.64%	89.47%	86.12%	86.37%	88.88%				

The following candidates were elected: Johnny Ahlqvist (S); Maja Bäckström (S); Ingvar Eriksson (M); Ingbritt Irhammar (C); Wiggo Komstedt (M); Kaj Larsson (S); Bo Lundgren (M); Margareta Mörck (FP); Börje Nilsson (S); Bengt Harding Olson (FP); Karl Erik Olsson (C); and Nils Erik Wååg (S).

===== 1982 =====
Results of the 1982 general election held on 19 September 1982:

Party		Votes per municipality													Total votes	%	Seats		
Party		Ängel- holm	Åstorp	Båstad	Brom- ölla	Hässle- holm	Klippan	Kristian- stad	Örkell- junga	Osby	Östra Göinge	Pers- torp	Simris- hamn	Tome- lilla	Total votes	%	Con.	Lev.	Tot.
Swedish Social Democratic Party	S	6,631	4,034	1,615	5,061	12,741	4,638	21,767	1,763	4,356	5,409	2,097	5,620	3,049	78,781	41.97%	5	0	5
Moderate Party	M	7,635	1,961	3,395	1,023	8,308	2,946	12,040	2,059	1,785	1,663	1,157	3,737	2,087	49,796	26.53%	3	0	3
Centre Party	C	4,046	1,191	2,501	788	7,567	2,207	6,998	1,483	2,051	1,594	788	2,985	2,531	36,730	19.57%	2	0	2
Liberal People's Party	FP	1,046	364	587	418	2,052	523	3,680	369	488	538	251	905	465	11,686	6.23%	1	0	1
Left Party – Communists	VPK	445	231	64	388	717	198	1,216	65	293	289	96	212	128	4,342	2.31%	0	0	0
Christian Democratic Unity	KDS	249	95	80	66	789	130	691	260	240	195	91	92	69	3,047	1.62%	0	0	0
Green Party	MP	418	60	164	71	457	111	757	80	134	126	40	213	121	2,752	1.47%	0	0	0
K-Party	K-P	3	1	0	6	9	10	11	2	8	10	21	1	1	83	0.04%	0	0	0
Other parties		16	7	52	6	100	32	94	9	20	33	6	121	12	508	0.27%	0	0	0
Valid votes		20,489	7,944	8,458	7,827	32,740	10,795	47,254	6,090	9,375	9,857	4,547	13,886	8,463	187,725	100.00%	11	0	11
Rejected votes		166	53	60	67	286	119	501	60	50	87	41	126	67	1,683	0.89%			
Total polled		20,655	7,997	8,518	7,894	33,026	10,914	47,755	6,150	9,425	9,944	4,588	14,012	8,530	189,408	90.90%			
Registered electors		22,677	8,688	9,256	8,468	36,269	12,079	52,372	6,764	10,305	10,830	5,083	15,831	9,757	208,379				
Turnout		91.08%	92.05%	92.03%	93.22%	91.06%	90.36%	91.18%	90.92%	91.46%	91.82%	90.26%	88.51%	87.42%	90.90%				

The following candidates were elected: Maja Bäckström (S); Lennart Bladh (S); Ulla Ekelund (C); Ingvar Eriksson (M); Eric Hägelmark (FP); Erik Johansson (S); Wiggo Komstedt (M); Einar Larsson (C); Bo Lundgren (M); Börje Nilsson (S); and Nils Erik Wååg (S).

Permanent substitutions:

- Einar Larsson (C) resigned on 30 April 1985 and was replaced by Karl Erik Olsson (C) on 1 May 1985.

==== 1970s ====
===== 1979 =====
Results of the 1979 general election held on 16 September 1979:

Party		Votes per municipality													Total votes	%	Seats		
Party		Ängel- holm	Åstorp	Båstad	Brom- ölla	Hässle- holm	Klippan	Kristian- stad	Örkell- junga	Osby	Östra Göinge	Pers- torp	Simris- hamn	Tome- lilla	Total votes	%	Con.	Lev.	Tot.
Swedish Social Democratic Party	S	6,228	3,767	1,477	4,695	11,524	4,350	20,167	1,547	4,059	5,153	2,035	5,070	2,764	72,836	39.50%	5	0	5
Moderate Party	M	6,513	1,674	2,782	915	7,381	2,536	10,501	1,852	1,515	1,455	1,015	3,303	2,020	43,462	23.57%	3	0	3
Centre Party	C	4,345	1,329	2,803	768	8,375	2,544	7,411	1,603	2,366	1,769	892	3,195	2,665	40,065	21.73%	2	0	2
Liberal People's Party	FP	2,051	736	794	695	3,451	979	6,281	595	823	871	382	1,639	852	20,149	10.93%	1	0	1
Left Party – Communists	VPK	344	195	77	367	710	172	1,177	67	281	260	68	217	120	4,055	2.20%	0	0	0
Christian Democratic Unity	KDS	194	68	52	55	585	77	519	261	185	169	66	80	69	2,380	1.29%	0	0	0
Workers' Party – The Communists	APK	0	1	0	2	11	1	8	1	23	15	28	3	0	93	0.05%	0	0	0
Communist Party of Sweden	SKP	6	4	0	3	3	3	52	1	1	1	0	6	2	82	0.04%	0	0	0
Other parties		192	24	149	13	187	78	260	13	25	41	10	232	26	1,250	0.68%	0	0	0
Valid votes		19,873	7,798	8,134	7,513	32,227	10,740	46,376	5,940	9,278	9,734	4,496	13,745	8,518	184,372	100.00%	11	0	11
Rejected votes		91	33	26	39	132	60	272	35	30	36	25	54	44	877	0.47%			
Total polled		19,964	7,831	8,160	7,552	32,359	10,800	46,648	5,975	9,308	9,770	4,521	13,799	8,562	185,249	90.48%			
Registered electors		21,935	8,516	8,914	8,163	35,817	11,933	51,447	6,603	10,267	10,714	5,019	15,645	9,774	204,747				
Turnout		91.01%	91.96%	91.54%	92.52%	90.35%	90.51%	90.67%	90.49%	90.66%	91.19%	90.08%	88.20%	87.60%	90.48%				

The following candidates were elected: Maja Bäckström (S); Lennart Bladh (S); Ulla Ekelund (C); Ingvar Eriksson (M); Eric Hägelmark (FP); Erik Johansson (S); Wiggo Komstedt (M); Einar Larsson (C); Bo Lundgren (M); Börje Nilsson (S); and Nils Erik Wååg (S).

===== 1976 =====
Results of the 1976 general election held on 19 September 1976:

Party		Votes per municipality													Total votes	%	Seats		
Party		Ängel- holm	Åstorp	Båstad	Brom- ölla	Hässle- holm	Klippan	Kristian- stad	Örkell- junga	Osby	Östra Göinge	Pers- torp	Simris- hamn	Tome- lilla	Total votes	%	Con.	Lev.	Tot.
Swedish Social Democratic Party	S	6,176	3,478	1,472	4,456	11,206	4,253	20,302	1,415	3,869	4,957	1,950	5,252	2,810	71,596	39.13%	4	1	5
Centre Party	C	6,417	1,896	3,602	1,181	11,167	3,474	10,870	2,132	3,207	2,335	1,325	4,174	3,261	55,041	30.08%	3	1	4
Moderate Party	M	4,505	1,097	1,823	620	5,009	1,793	7,728	1,490	1,004	1,080	682	2,465	1,522	30,818	16.84%	2	0	2
People's Party	F	1,831	647	763	573	3,651	945	5,676	587	795	765	439	1,602	910	19,184	10.49%	1	0	1
Left Party – Communists	VPK	242	99	54	326	587	140	929	52	267	240	87	190	81	3,294	1.80%	0	0	0
Christian Democratic Unity	KDS	172	60	64	85	624	102	577	203	185	190	75	110	79	2,526	1.38%	0	0	0
Communist Party of Sweden	SKP	11	1	2	21	13	2	69	2	12	3	0	5	4	145	0.08%	0	0	0
Other parties		4	4	69	10	62	0	26	2	8	13	6	114	33	351	0.19%	0	0	0
Valid votes		19,358	7,282	7,849	7,272	32,319	10,709	46,177	5,883	9,347	9,583	4,564	13,912	8,700	182,955	100.00%	10	2	12
Rejected votes		53	14	16	24	74	29	112	16	19	25	15	27	22	446	0.24%			
Total polled		19,411	7,296	7,865	7,296	32,393	10,738	46,289	5,899	9,366	9,608	4,579	13,939	8,722	183,401	91.56%			
Registered electors		21,172	7,887	8,507	7,839	35,407	11,721	50,470	6,409	10,192	10,431	4,990	15,528	9,748	200,301				
Turnout		91.68%	92.51%	92.45%	93.07%	91.49%	91.61%	91.72%	92.04%	91.90%	92.11%	91.76%	89.77%	89.47%	91.56%				

The following candidates were elected: Lennart Bladh (S); Ulla Ekelund (C); Gusti Gustavsson (S); Martin Henmark (F); Erik Johansson (S); Wiggo Komstedt (M); Einar Larsson (C); Bo Lundgren (M); Anna-Lisa Nilsson (C); Börje Nilsson (S); Karl Erik Olsson (C); and Nils Erik Wååg (S).

Permanent substitutions:

- Martin Henmark (F) died on 8 March 1977 and was replaced by Eric Hägelmark (F) in March 1977.

===== 1973 =====
Results of the 1973 general election held on 16 September 1973:

Party		Votes per municipality													Total votes	%	Seats		
Party		Ängel- holm	Åstorp	Båstad	Brom- ölla	Hässle- holm	Klippan	Kristian- stad	Örkell- junga	Osby	Östra Göinge	Pers- torp	Simris- hamn	Tome- lilla	Total votes	%	Con.	Lev.	Tot.
Swedish Social Democratic Party	S	6,227	3,288	1,506	4,155	11,003	4,331	20,153	1,427	3,899	4,709	1,968	5,207	2,758	70,631	40.94%	4	1	5
Centre Party	C	6,244	1,931	3,410	1,146	11,144	3,637	11,667	2,117	2,954	2,360	1,354	4,292	3,270	55,526	32.18%	3	1	4
Moderate Party	M	3,615	868	1,457	477	4,145	1,459	6,096	1,239	987	906	590	2,085	1,237	25,161	14.58%	2	0	2
People's Party	F	1,207	359	633	413	2,793	660	4,190	507	582	574	318	1,285	884	14,405	8.35%	1	0	1
Left Party – Communists	VPK	237	92	63	415	624	177	1,022	75	323	276	120	184	70	3,678	2.13%	0	0	0
Christian Democratic Unity	KDS	182	70	71	71	793	55	686	246	223	213	88	113	111	2,922	1.69%	0	0	0
Communist Party of Sweden	SKP	20	3	3	9	10	6	42	2	1	5	3	24	8	136	0.08%	0	0	0
Communist League Marxist–Leninists (the revolutionaries)	KFML(r)	3	0	3	4	14	0	22	0	3	1	1	1	3	55	0.03%	0	0	0
Other parties		2	0	0	0	6	0	3	0	0	2	1	0	1	15	0.01%	0	0	0
Valid votes		17,737	6,611	7,146	6,690	30,532	10,325	43,881	5,613	8,972	9,046	4,443	13,191	8,342	172,529	100.00%	10	2	12
Rejected votes		34	8	9	9	41	21	66	10	11	9	10	21	3	252	0.15%			
Total polled		17,771	6,619	7,155	6,699	30,573	10,346	43,947	5,623	8,983	9,055	4,453	13,212	8,345	172,781	90.63%			
Registered electors		19,642	7,222	7,897	7,274	33,755	11,386	48,174	6,208	9,814	9,851	4,856	15,019	9,539	190,637				
Turnout		90.47%	91.65%	90.60%	92.10%	90.57%	90.87%	91.23%	90.58%	91.53%	91.92%	91.70%	87.97%	87.48%	90.63%				

The following candidates were elected: Egon Andreasson (C); Lennart Bladh (S); Ulla Ekelund (C); Gusti Gustavsson (S); Martin Henmark (F); Erik Johansson (S); Wiggo Komstedt (M); Einar Larsson (C); Anna-Lisa Nilsson (C); Börje Nilsson (S); Nils Yngve Nilsson (M); and Nils Erik Wååg (S).

===== 1970 =====
Results of the 1970 general election held on 20 September 1970:

Party		Votes	%	Seats		
Party		Votes	%	Con.	Lev.	Tot.
Swedish Social Democratic Party	S	71,081	42.69%	4	1	5
Centre Party	C	42,345	25.43%	3	0	3
People's Party	F	24,261	14.57%	2	0	2
Moderate Party	M	21,931	13.17%	1	1	2
Christian Democratic Unity	KDS	3,749	2.25%	0	0	0
Left Party – Communists	VPK	3,042	1.83%	0	0	0
Communist League Marxists-Leninists	KFML	89	0.05%	0	0	0
Other parties		11	0.01%	0	0	0
Valid votes		166,509	100.00%	10	2	12
Rejected votes		283	0.17%			
Total polled inc. postal votes		166,792	88.08%			
Registered electors		189,367				
Turnout		88.08%				

The following candidates were elected: Egon Andreasson (C); Gunnar Engkvist (S); Gusti Gustavsson (S); Martin Henmark (F); Erik Johansson (S); Wiggo Komstedt (M); Svante Kristiansson (S); Einar Larsson (C); Anna-Lisa Nilsson (C); Nils Yngve Nilsson (M); Magnus Taube (F); and Nils Erik Wååg (S).
