= Elofsson =

Elofsson is a surname, an Americanized form (and a rare Swedish variant) of Swedish Elofson. It is a patronymic from the personal name Elof, from Old Norse Eilífr, a compound of ei ('alone', 'sole' or 'always') + lífr ('living', 'alive').

Notable people with the surname include:

- Blåvitt Elofsson (born 1953), Swedish politician
- Gustaf Elofsson (1897–1971), Swedish politician
- Jonas Elofsson (born 1979), Swedish ice hockey player
- Jörgen Elofsson (born 1962), Swedish songwriter
- Per Elofsson (born 1977), Swedish cross-country skier
- Tomas Elofsson (born 1977), Swedish guitarist and songwriter
- Torsten Elofsson (born 1950), Swedish politician

== See also ==
- Olofsson
