= Sjöstrand =

Sjöstrand may refer to:

- Arnold Sjöstrand (1903–1955), Swedish actor and film director
- Carl Eneas Sjöstrand (1828–1906), Swedish sculptor
- Johan Sjöstrand (born 1987), Swedish handballer
- Johannes Sjöstrand (born 1947), Swedish mathematician
- Oscar Sjöstrand (born 2004), Swedish footballer
- Östen Sjöstrand (1925–2006), Swedish poet, writer and translator
- Sven-Erik Sjöstrand (born 1954), is a Swedish Left Party politician, member of the Riksdag 1998–2006
- Tore Sjöstrand (born 1921), former Swedish athlete, winner of 3000 m steeplechase at the 1948 Summer Olympics
