= Tuve Skånberg =

Swedish politician (born 1956)

Tuve Skånberg KD

Alderman of the House
- In office 1 January 2020 – 26 September 2022
- Preceded by: Beatrice Ask
- Succeeded by: Carina Ohlsson

Member of the Swedish Riksdag for Skåne Northern and Eastern
- In office 4 October 2010 – 26 September 2022
- In office 30 September 1991 – 2 October 2006

Personal details
- Born: 9 April 1956 (age 70) Gothenburg, Sweden
- Party: Christian Democrats
- Spouse: Eva Skånberg
- Education: Lund University
- Occupation: Pastor

Tuve Martin Hugo Skånberg von Beetzen (born 9 April 1956) is a Swedish Christian Democratic politician, member of the Swedish Riksdag from 1991 to 2006 and again from 2010 to 2022. Skånberg is Doctor of Theology of Lund University (2003) and a minister of the Mission Covenant Church of Sweden (1980). He was President by age from 1 January 2020 until he left parliament on 26 September 2022.

Skånberg has a conservative Christian Democratic political profile. Among his more than 500 bills to the Swedish Riksdag, some have been considered controversial, as Riksdag bills against gay marriage and homosexual adoption, for the banning of blasphemy and for "nondiscrimination" of creationism in Swedish schools and in admission to graduate school.

Skånberg has been a visiting fellow at Cambridge University (2001), a visiting scholar at Jesus College, Cambridge (2001), a distinguished professor in history at Graduate Theological Union (2006), a visiting scholar at Stanford University (2006), an adjunct associate professor of church history at Fuller Theological Seminary (2006/2007, 2010), a guest professor in patristic at Saint Petersburg Evangelical Academy (2007), and director of the Clapham Institute (2008).

== Publications ==
- Sövestads by och dess gamla fogdesläkt (1991)
- "Till enn nådigh Lösen", Måns Bonde till Traneberg och konflikten med Gustav Vasa (2001)
- Glömda gudstecken. Från fornkyrklig dopliturgi till allmogens bomärken (2003)
- I maktens korridorer. Handbok för nyblivna riksdagsledamöter (2006), coauthor Johnny Gylling)

== Sources ==
- The website of the Swedish Parliament Riksdagen
- Skånberg's website at the website of the Swedish Christian Democrats

Political offices
Preceded by Beatrice Ask	President by age 2020–2022	Succeeded by Carina Ohlsson
