= Birte Sandberg =

Swedish politician

Member of the Riksdag
- Incumbent
- Assumed office 28 September 2026
- Constituency: Skåne County Northern and Eastern

Personal details
- Born: 1965 (age 60–61)
- Party: Centre Party

Birte Sandberg (born 1965) is a Swedish teacher and politician from the Centre Party. She has been a member of the Riksdag since 2026, elected for the Skåne County Northern and Eastern constituency.

== Biography ==
Sandberg was born in Tomelilla and lives in Tomelilla Municipality. She is a qualified primary school teacher and has a Master of Philosophy in Educational Science and postgraduate studies.

Sandberg has held political positions for the Centre Party since 1985. She has been a member of the Regional Council in Region Skåne and the Regional Executive Board, as well as group leader for the Centre Party in Region Skåne.

Sandberg previously ran for parliament. In the 2006 Swedish general election, she was third deputy for the Centre Party in the Skåne County Northern and Eastern constituency.

Ahead of the 2026 Swedish general election, Sandberg was in first place on the Centre Party's parliamentary list in the northern and eastern constituency of Skåne County.

== See also ==
- List of members of the Riksdag, 2026–2030
