= Carina Moberg =

Swedish politician (1966–2012)

Member of the Riksdag for Stockholm County
- In office 1994–2012

Personal details
- Born: 17 April 1966
- Died: 15 August 2012 (aged 46) Huddinge, Sweden
- Party: Social Democrats
- Profession: Physiotherapist

Carina Elisabeth Moberg (17 April 1966 – 15 August 2012) was a Swedish social democratic politician who was leader of her party's group in the Riksdag from 2011 to 2012, when she was replaced by Mikael Damberg.

She had been an MP representing Stockholms län since 1994.

Before entering Parliament she was a physiotherapist.

In the Riksdag, she was Group Leader of the Social Democratic Party and Deputy Chair of the Nominations Committee. She also sat on the Advisory Council on Foreign Affairs and the Riksdag Board.

She was an official guest at the 2010 wedding of Crown Princess Victoria, accompanied by Johnny Ahlqvist.

Her political priorities included gender equality in marriage and employment.>
