= Ylva Johansson =

Swedish politician (born 1964)

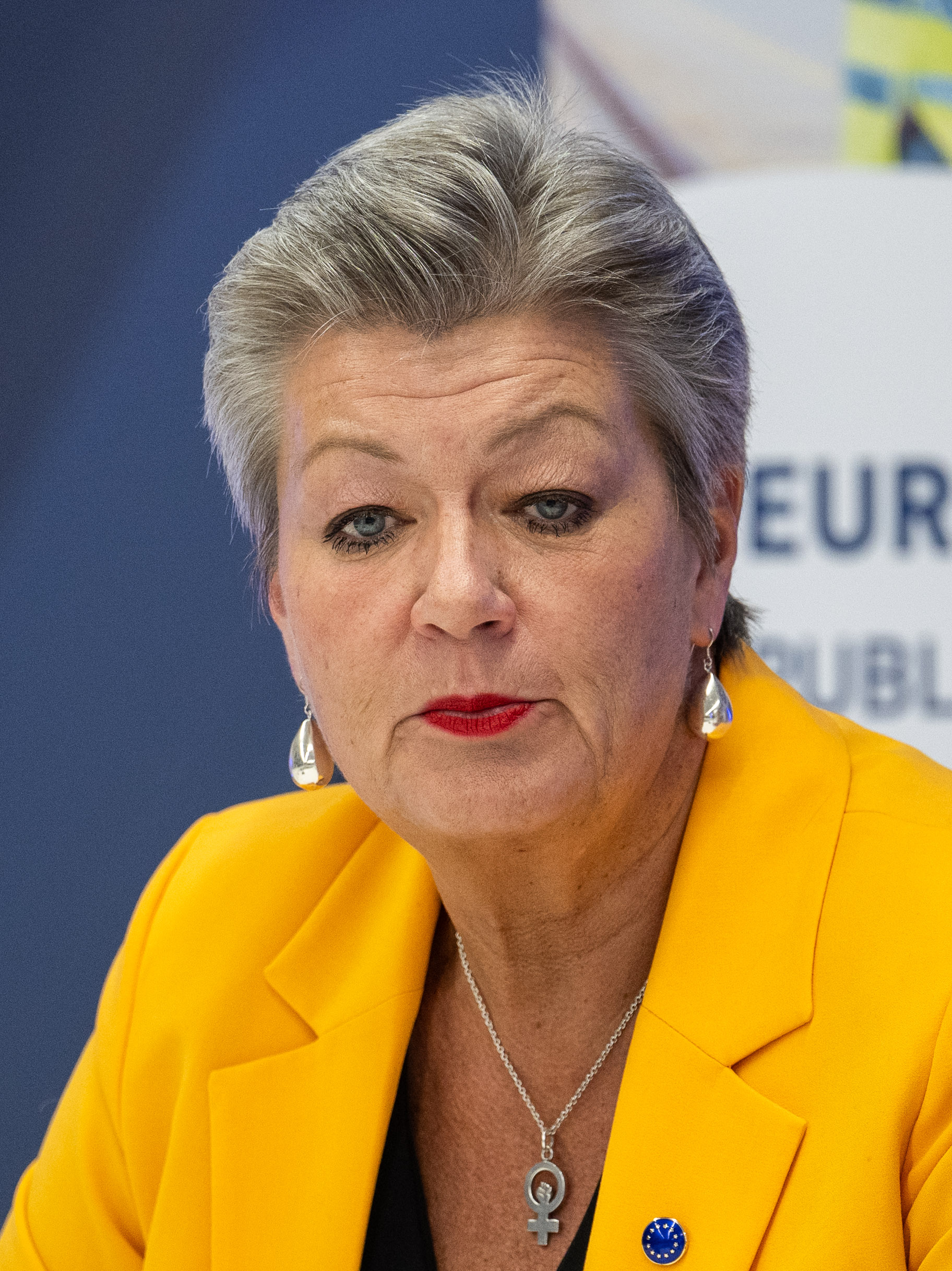
- Johansson in 2024

European Commissioner for Home Affairs
- In office 1 December 2019 – 30 November 2024
- Commission: Von der Leyen I
- Preceded by: Dimitris Avramopoulos
- Succeeded by: Magnus Brunner

Minister for Employment
- In office 3 October 2014 – 10 September 2019
- Prime Minister: Stefan Löfven
- Preceded by: Elisabeth Svantesson
- Succeeded by: Eva Nordmark

Minister for Health and Elderly Care
- In office 13 September 2004 – 6 October 2006
- Prime Minister: Göran Persson
- Preceded by: Lars Engqvist (as Minister for Health and Social Affairs)
- Succeeded by: Göran Hägglund (Health Care); Maria Larsson (Elderly Care)

Minister for Schools
- In office 7 October 1994 – 7 October 1998
- Prime Minister: Ingvar Carlsson; Göran Persson
- Preceded by: Beatrice Ask
- Succeeded by: Ingegerd Wärnersson

Member of Parliament for Stockholm Municipality
- In office 6 October 2006 – 5 September 2019
- In office 4 October 1988 – 30 September 1991

Personal details
- Born: 13 February 1964 (age 62) Huddinge, Sweden
- Party: Social Democratic (since 1992)
- Other political affiliations: VPK (until 1992)
- Spouse(s): Bo Hammar (m. 1990; div. 1999) Erik Åsbrink (m. 2002)
- Children: 3
- Education: Lund University; Stockholm Institute of Education

Ylva Julia Margareta Johansson (born 13 February 1964) is a Swedish politician who served as European Commissioner for Home Affairs and Sweden's European Commissioner in the von der Leyen Commission from 1 December 2019 to 30 November 2024.

Johansson was previously minister for schools from 1994 to 1998, minister for health and elderly care from 2004 to 2006 and minister for employment from 2014 to 2019 in the Government of Sweden. She was Member of Parliament representing Stockholm Municipality, from 1988 to 1991 for the Left Party – Communists and from 2006 to 2019 for the Social Democrats. A teacher by profession, she holds a Master of Science degree in education from Lund University and the Stockholm Institute of Education.

== Education and early career ==
Johansson studied at Lund University and the Stockholm Institute of Education between 1983–88 and 1991–92 respectively, and holds a Master of Science degree in education. Upon graduating, she worked as a math, physics, and chemistry teacher.

== Political career ==
=== Early beginnings ===
In the 1988 general elections Johansson was elected as a member of the Riksdag for the Left Party – Communists (VPK). She later left the party and joined the Social Democrats.

From 1992 to 1994 Johansson worked as a teacher, until Prime Minister Ingvar Carlsson made her minister for schools in his government. In 1998, she and the then Minister for Finance Erik Åsbrink announced their wish to "publicly confirm that we are in love" and their intention to separate from their respective partners. Soon afterwards, Johansson left the government. The following years, she worked in the private sector.

In 2004, Prime Minister Göran Persson appointed Johansson to the government in a new position, as minister for health and elderly care, succeeding Lars Engqvist.

=== Minister for Employment, 2014–2019 ===
From 2014, Johansson served as minister for employment in the government of Prime Minister Stefan Löfven. During her time in office, she worked to tighten labor immigration laws.

In the 2013 Social Democrat party congress, the goal was set that Sweden should have the lowest rate of unemployment in the EU. While the Social Democrats and Green Party were in power, unemployment decreased more in other EU countries than Sweden and by 2019, Sweden's place in the unemployment ranking slipped to 18 with an unemployment rate of 6.2%, where the first spot was occupied by Czech Republic at 1.7%.

=== Member of the European Commission, 2019–2024 ===
Following the 2019 European elections, Löfven nominated Johansson as Sweden's candidate for the post of European Commissioner.

During a question & answer session in October 2019 in the European Parliament, Johansson was asked on whether Swedish policy on gang crime and migration would be exported to the EU level. Johansson responded that she was "proud that Sweden received so many refugees".

In early March 2020, Johansson was appointed by President Ursula von der Leyen to serve on a special task force to coordinate the European Union's response to the COVID-19 pandemic.

In September 2023, more than 120 boats carrying around 7,000 migrants from Africa arrived on the Italian island of Lampedusa in the span of 24 hours. Johansson said that "We are seeing a really challenging situation in Lampedusa. This is a European matter that needs a European response."

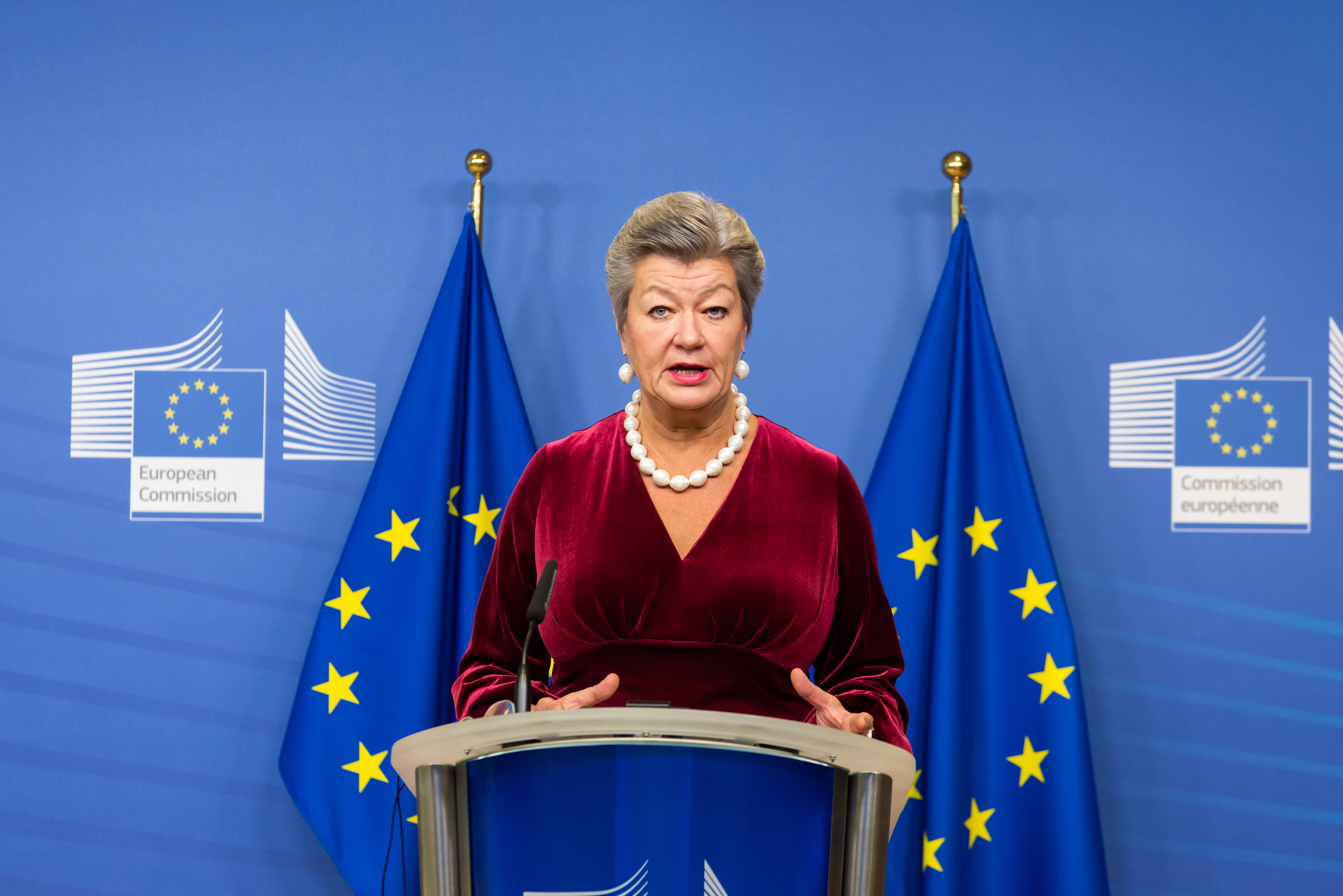
Ylva Johansson on 5 December 2022

In April 2024, she warned member states of legal consequences if they fail to enforce the New Pact on Migration and Asylum.

=== European Commission special envoy ===
On 17 June 2025, after leaving her post as a commissioner, the European Commission appointed Johansson to be a special envoy for Ukrainians in the European Union. According to the EU, her role is to facilitate the integration of Ukrainians into EU member states or facilitate their return to Ukraine, decided by individual preference.

== Political positions ==
Johansson has been described as the "left wing of the Social Democrats".

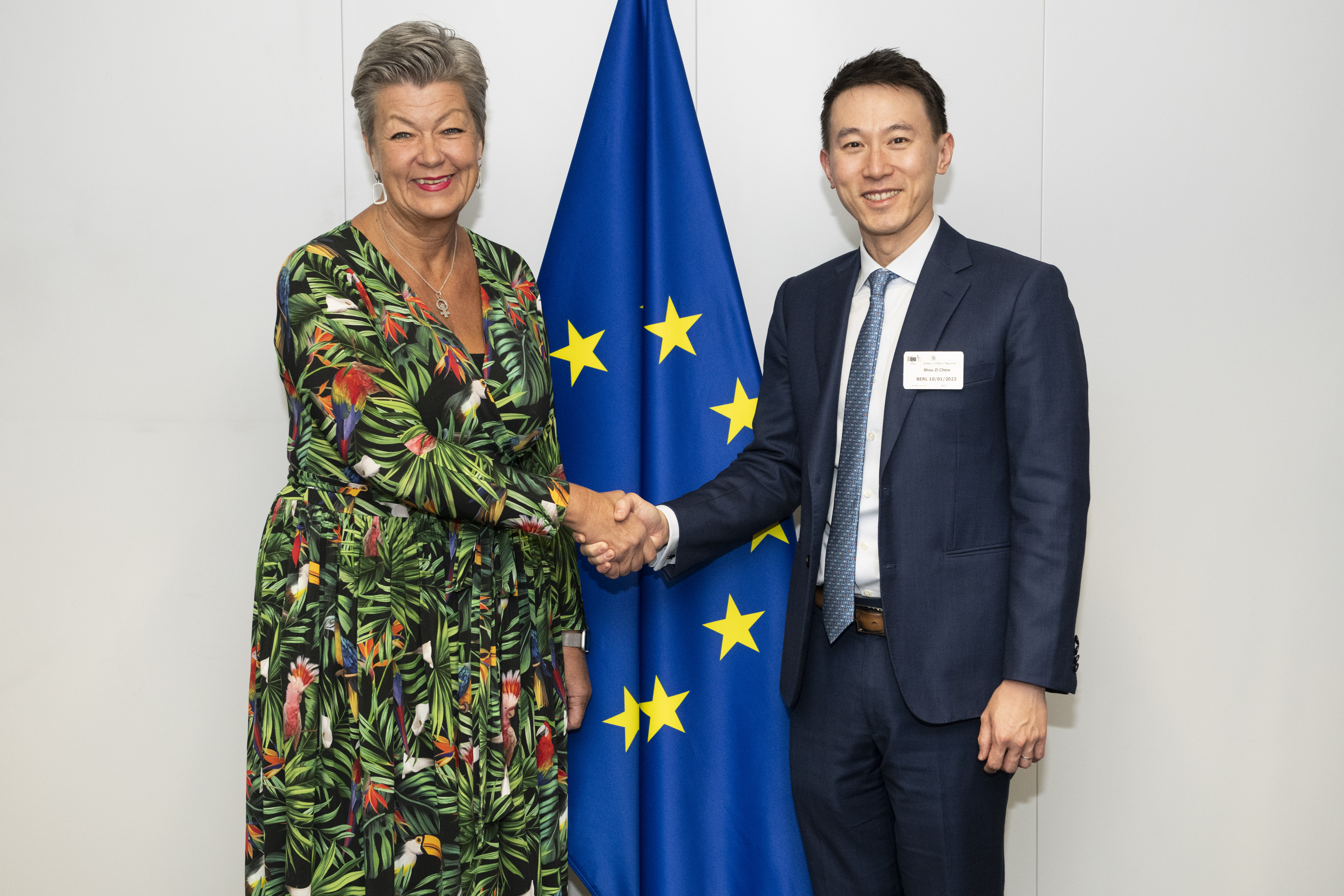
Johansson meeting with TikTok CEO Shou Zi Chew on 10 January 2023

In a September 2020 EU debate on the new migration pact she said "we have a lot of migration to the European Union, and we need that" because of the ageing of Europe, while also noting that "those that are not eligible to stay, they have to leave; not everybody that has a right to apply for asylum has the right to stay in the European Union".

In 2024 Fabrice Leggeri recalled when he was director of Frontex and requested funding, Johansson asked why he needed uniforms and guns - since the refugees eventually came because of "love".

=== Surveillance of private chat communication ===
In May 2022, Johansson proposed an EU "Child Sexual Abuse Regulation" introducing an obligation for companies to monitor all private chat communication, including pictures, for possible hints at child abuse and report any findings to the authorities.

The proposed legislation faced widespread criticism and was described as introducing mass surveillance. The scientific service of the German Bundestag evaluated the proposal and concluded it was illegal due to necessitating blanket surveillance of private communication, the impossibility to differentiate legal and illegal communication and harmful effects on communication by and between children.

Johansson defended her proposal to scan all electronic chats as not introducing surveillance, which was—among other claims—described as untrue or at least misleading. Research by several newspapers led to allegations of questionable connections between Johansson and her staff and companies that would benefit financially from her proposal, including Thorn and WeProtect. Johansson characterized the accusations in different ways, including by dismissing them as just accusations, false or as true but not illegal. Her claim to have given data protection organizations the same access as to the backers of her proposal was rejected as untrue by several organizations and members of the EU parliament.

Johansson reacted to growing rejection of her proposal by ordering commercial advertisement on Twitter paid for with EU funds. The advertisement was criticized as being misleading and illegal according to the EU's rules for targeted advertisement.

== Personal life ==
Johansson has two children with her former husband Bo Hammar and a son with her husband Erik Åsbrink. She is an honorary member of the Swedish football club Hammarby IF.

Political offices
Preceded by Beatrice Ask	Minister for Schools; 1994–1998	Succeeded by Ingegerd Wärnersson
Preceded by Lars Engqvist	Minister for Health and Elderly Care; 2004–2006	Succeeded by Göran Hägglund as Minister for Health and Social Affairs
Preceded by Lars Engqvist	Minister for Health and Elderly Care; 2004–2006	Succeeded by Maria Larsson as Minister for Elderly Care and Public Health
Preceded by Elisabeth Svantesson	Minister for Employment; 2014–2019	Succeeded by Eva Nordmark
Preceded by Cecilia Malmström	Swedish European Commissioner; 2019–2024	Succeeded by Jessika Roswall
Preceded by Dimitris Avramopoulos	European Commissioner for Home Affairs; 2019–2024	Succeeded by Magnus Brunner
