= Bo Lundgren =

Swedish politician (born 1947)

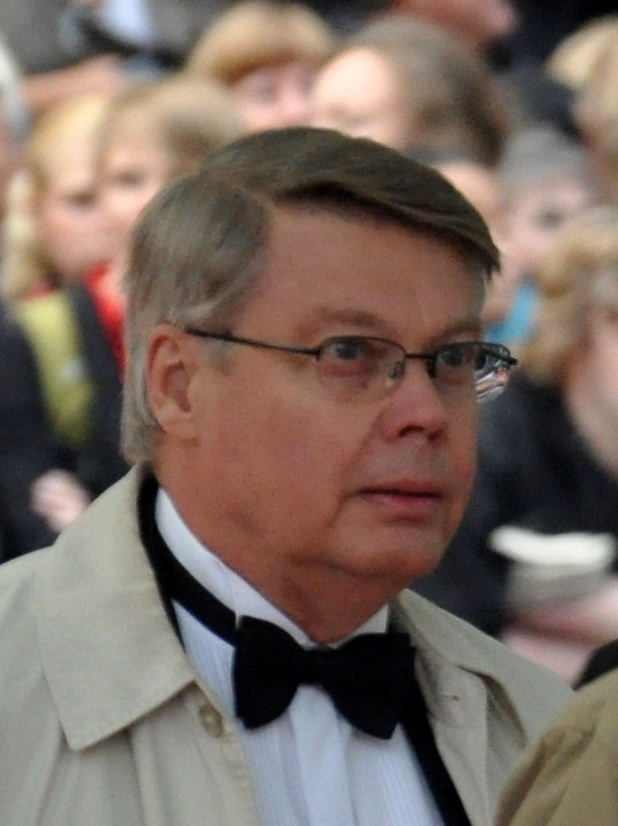

Director-General of the Swedish National Debt Office
- In office 1 October 2004 – 31 January 2013
- Preceded by: Thomas Franzén
- Succeeded by: Hans Lindblad

Leader of the Moderate Party
- In office 4 September 1999 – 25 October 2003
- Preceded by: Carl Bildt
- Succeeded by: Fredrik Reinfeldt

Leader of the Opposition
- In office 4 September 1999 – 25 October 2003
- Monarch: Carl XVI Gustaf
- Prime Minister: Göran Persson
- Preceded by: Carl Bildt
- Succeeded by: Fredrik Reinfeldt

Minister for Sports
- In office 4 October 1991 – 7 October 1994
- Prime Minister: Carl Bildt
- Preceded by: Ulf Lönnqvist
- Succeeded by: Marita Ulvskog

Member of the Riksdag
- In office 1976–2004
- Constituency: Skåne Northern and Eastern

Personal details
- Born: 11 July 1947 (age 79) Kristianstad, Sweden
- Party: Moderate Party
- Spouse: Charlotte Lundgren
- Children: 2
- Education: Lund University

Military service
- Allegiance: Sweden
- Branch/service: Swedish Army
- Years of service: 1972-1978
- Unit: Wendes Artillery Regiment

Bo Axel Magnus Lundgren (born 11 July 1947) is a Swedish politician who served as the leader of the Moderate Party from 1999 to 2003. Lundgren also served as Minister for Sports from 1991 to 1994 and Director-General of the Swedish National Debt Office from 2004 to 2013.

Lundgren served as Minister for Fiscal and Financial Affairs from 1991 to 1994 in the government of Carl Bildt, with responsibility mainly for financial markets, taxation and housing. The country faced a severe financial crisis after the bursting of a speculation bubble which had developed in the 1980s. The Swedish government's management of the crisis attracted international attention, especially after the late 2000s recession. Lundgren testified to the US Congressional Oversight Panel in 2009 and was also called to the European Parliament and the Irish Parliament to speak about management of financial crises.

== Early life, education, and personal life ==
Bo Lundgren was born in Kristianstad to Alf Lundgren (1913-1985) and Inez Nilsson (1918-2003). He earned a degree in business and administration from Lund University in 1972, and began training as a Reserve Officer in the Swedish Army. He served from 1972 to 1978, and reached the rank of Captain.

Lundgren received an honorary doctorate from Lund University in 2010. He resides in Lund with his wife and two children.

== Political career ==
Lundgren first became active in politics by becoming a board member of the Moderate Party's county association in Kristianstad in 1969, and later became leader of the Moderate Youth League in Kristianstad from 1971 to 1974. He became a member of the Riksdag in 1976, representing his home constituency of Skåne Northern and Eastern.

Lundgren later served as Minister for Sports under Prime minister Carl Bildt from 1991 to 1994.

=== Leader of the Moderate Party ===
In 1999, he succeeded Bildt as party leader and became leader of the opposition. He brought the party into the 2002 Swedish general election, becoming the coalitions candidate for Prime Minister.

During the elections, Lundgren was perceived to be a technocratic politician who put too much emphasis on budget numbers and tax cuts, which might have contributed to the party's poor showing that year. He was criticised for promising to cut taxes by 130 billion Swedish kronor, a vision that according to his opponents might have jeopardised the welfare state, although the number seems to have been calculated by political opponents.

He resigned one year later after the party's poor results in 2002. He was succeeded by Fredrik Reinfeldt, who helped move the party to the political centre during Lundgrens time as leader.

== Career after politics ==
Lundgren served as director general of the Swedish National Debt Office (Riksgäldskontoret) from 2004 to 2013. He played a further role in the government's response to the late 2000s recession, along with Stefan Ingves the head of Sveriges Riksbank, which included the nationalisation of Carnegie Investment Bank. After leaving the Debt Office, he was appointed chairman of Sparbanken Öresund as well as of some other institutions.

Lundgren is still respected among many Moderates for his principled stand on issues as a leader, especially since Fredrik Reinfeldt has been pursuing more centrist policies.

Currently, he is on the advisory board of OMFIF where he is regularly involved in meetings regarding the financial and monetary system.

Party political offices
Preceded by Carl Bildt	Leader of the Swedish Moderate Party; 1999–2003	Succeeded by Fredrik Reinfeldt
