= Linnea Bengtsson =

Swedish politician (born 2000)

Member of the Riksdag
- Incumbent
- Assumed office 28 September 2026
- Constituency: Skåne County Northern and Eastern

Personal details
- Born: 9 July 2000 (age 26)
- Party: Left Party

Linnea Christina Bengtsson (born 9 July 2000) is a Swedish politician who was elected member of the Riksdag in 2026. She has served as chairwoman of the Left Party in Kristianstad since 2023.
