= Lennart Bladh =

Member of the Riksdag from 1974 to 1985

Member of the Riksdag
- In office January 10, 1974 – September 30, 1985
- Constituency: Skåne Northern and Eastern

Personal details
- Born: Lennart Villiam Bladh; July 3, 1920; Kristianstad, Sweden
- Died: July 10, 2006 (aged 86)
- Political party: Social Democrats

Lennart Villiam Bladh (July 3, 1920 – July 10, 2006) was a Swedish politician who served as member of the Riksdag (MP) from 1974 to 1985.

Bladh was born in 1920 in Kristianstad, and received education at folk high school and university. He was employed as a laborer before transitioning into schoolteacher roles as crafts teacher and careers master. A member of the Swedish Social Democratic Party, Bladh was elected member of the Riksdag from Skåne Northern and Eastern in the 1973 general election and held his seat until 1985. Bladh passed to unspecified causes in 2006.

== Personal life ==
Lennart Villiam Bladh was born on July 3, 1920, in the city and then county of Kristianstad, to Matilda Jakobsson and railway worker Nils Bladh. Lennart resided in Hässleholm and was married to a woman named Gunvor.

Bladh passed away to unspecified causes on July 10, 2006, aged 86. He was buried at Östra begravningsplats in Hässleholm.

== Education and career ==
Bladh attended folk high school in 1947–1948 and again 1957–1959, before studying at university in the early 60s. He worked as a laborer in the wood industry from 1935 to 1953 and was afterwards employed in schoolteacher roles as slöjdlärare (crafts teacher) and careers master.

As a member of the Swedish Social Democratic Party, Bladh was elected to the Riksdag for Kristianstad County's Skåne Northern and Eastern constituency in the 1973 general election. He held the seat for 12 years, re-elected in 1976, 1979, and 1982. During his tenure, he was a member and chair of the Education and Culture Affairs Committees.

== See also ==
- List of former members of the Riksdag
