= Hans Wallmark =

Swedish politician (born 1965)

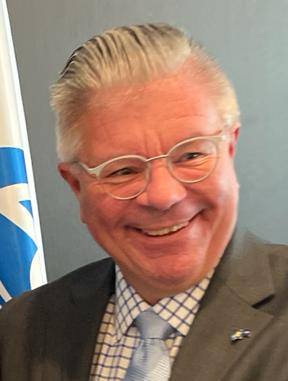

Deputy Group Leader of the Moderate Party in the Swedish Riksdag
- In office 20 January 2015 – 29 September 2020
- Party chairman: Anna Kinberg Batra; Ulf Kristersson
- Preceded by: Tomas Tobé
- Succeeded by: Jessika Roswall

Member of the Swedish Riksdag for Skåne Northern and Eastern
- In office 2 October 2006 – 20 August 2024

President of the Nordic Council
- In office 13 June 2019 – 31 December 2019
- Preceded by: Jessica Polfjärd
- Succeeded by: Silja Dögg Gunnarsdóttir
- In office 9 October 2014 – 31 October 2014
- Preceded by: Karin Åström
- Succeeded by: Höskuldur Þórhallsson

Personal details
- Born: 23 January 1965 (age 60); Boden, Sweden
- Political party: Moderate Party

Hans Wallmark (born 23 January 1965) is a Swedish politician of the Moderate Party. He was member of the Riksdag from 2006 to 2024. He served as President of the Nordic Council in 2014 and in 2019.

== Ambassador to Denmark ==
Hans Wallmark has been Ambassador of Sweden to Denmark since 20 August 2024. In his capacity as ambassador, he is tasked with representing Sweden and its government in the Kingdom of Denmark, promoting Swedish interests.
