= Anne Ramberg =

Swedish lawyer

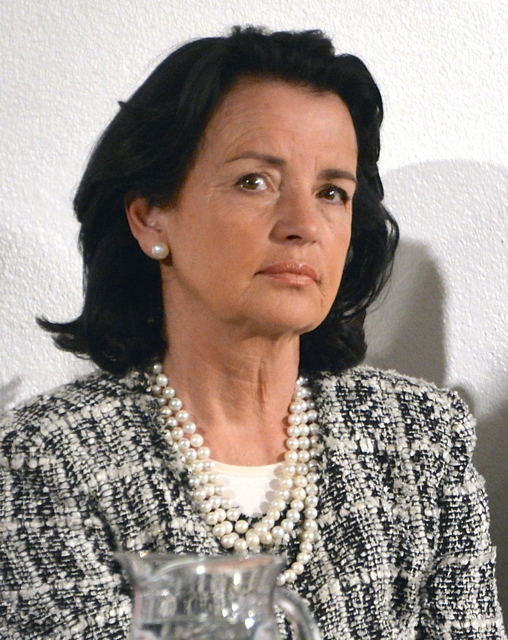
- Anne Ramberg (2014)
- Born: Anne-Christine Christenson; 26 August 1952 (age 73); Stockholm, Sweden
- Children: 1

Anne-Christine Ramberg (born 26 August 1952) is a Swedish lawyer and since 2000 the general secretary for the Swedish Bar Association (Sveriges advokatsamfund). She is the first woman to hold this position.

== Biography ==
Ramberg is the daughter of Agne Christenson and his wife Elise, a lawyer. She grew up in Östermalm in Stockholm, where she lived at Grev Magnigatan and studied at Norra Real. She worked as a secretary between 1974 and 1975. She studied law at Stockholm University, and became a candidate in 1976. She has been a practicing lawyer since 1981. Besides her work as the general secretary for the Swedish Bar Association, she also has other positions both in Sweden and internationally. She has been a member of the Swedish Judges Proposals Board, has worked for the European Court of Justice, and has been a member of the economic crime units board. She has also worked for and been a member of the International Legal Assistance Consortium (ILAC), the International Bar Association (IBA), the International Bar Association Human Rights Institute (BAHRI) and IBA Human Rights Trust, Council of Bars and Law Societies of Europe (CCBE) and CEELI Institute.

She has previously been a member of Press opinion board for six years, chairman of the board at Juristföreningen (Lawyers Association) in Stockholm. as well as chairman of the board at Stockholm University, and for many years a member of the ethical council at the national Police board, and general director at the security police reference group.

In 2006, Ramberg was awarded the H. M. The King's Medal of 12th size with a blue ribbon for her work in the Swedish justice system. In 2016, Ramberg became the recipient of an honorary doctorate degree from the judicial faculty at Uppsala University. Ramberg was chosen to give the 12th annual Anna Lindh Lecture in Lund in 2016 where she addressed the challenge to businesses of upholding human rights.

== Positions ==
In her role as a general secretary and lawyer, Ramberg has often been involved in judicial matters in the social debate in Sweden, which has often caused controversy. Ramberg has been critical towards several propositions by justice minister Thomas Bodström about giving the police more room for surveillance and interception, which she thought compromised personal integrity. She has also criticized the Swedish Tax Office for its tax revisions against law firms and its way to review others by the so-called third man revisions. She has also directed criticism towards justice minister Beatrice Ask, who expressed the opinion that suspected sex buyers should be exposed by media; Ramberg said that it was a "scary opinion".

== Personal life ==
Between 1977 and 2002, Ramberg was married to lawyer Fredrik Ramberg (born 1949), who is the son of lawyer Johan Ramberg. The couple have a son together, who was born in 1984. She has since been in a relationship with lawyer Claes Lundblad (born 1946).
