= Marianne Littke =

Swedish politician (born 1965)

Member of the Riksdag
- Incumbent
- Assumed office 28 September 2026
- Constituency: Skåne County Northern and Eastern

Personal details
- Born: 20 August 1965 (age 61) Sweden
- Party: Liberals

Marianne Littke (born 20 August 1965) is a Swedish politician from the Liberals. She has been a member of the Riksdag since 2026, elected for the Skåne County Northern and Eastern constituency.

== Biography ==
Littke is a lawyer and behavioral scientist and lives in Ballingslöv in Hässleholm Municipality.

She has previously been politically active for the Liberals in Hässleholm Municipality. In 2017, she was appointed as a substitute member of the Hässleholm Municipal Council. During the 2022–2026 mandate period, she was a member of the municipality's election committee.

At the 2026 Swedish general election, Littke became the Liberal Party's leading candidate in the Skåne County Northern and Eastern constituency. She thus returned to national politics after an absence of about 25 years from politics.

Littke was elected as a member of parliament for the Liberal Party in the Skåne County Northern and Eastern constituency.

== See also ==
- List of members of the Riksdag, 2026–2030
