= Beatrice Ask =

Swedish politician (born 1956)

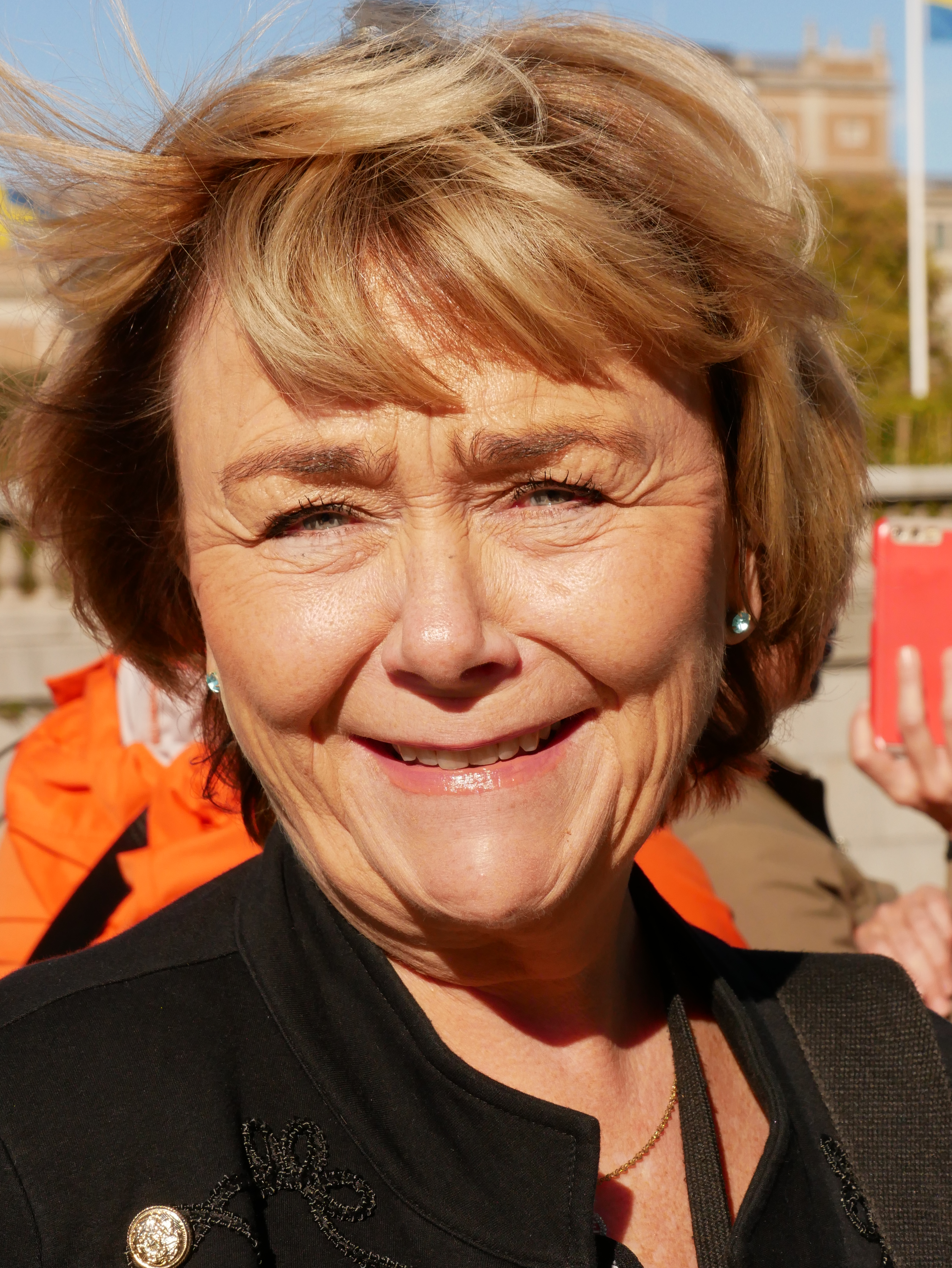

Governor of Södermanland County
- In office 1 January 2020 – 31 March 2025
- Monarch: Carl XVI Gustaf
- Prime Minister: Stefan Löfven; Magdalena Andersson; Ulf Kristersson
- Preceded by: Liselott Hagberg
- Succeeded by: Johanna Sandwall (acting)

Alderman of the House
- In office 24 September 2018 – 31 December 2019
- Preceded by: Krister Örnfjäder
- Succeeded by: Tuve Skånberg

Minister for Justice
- In office 6 October 2006 – 3 October 2014
- Prime Minister: Fredrik Reinfeldt
- Preceded by: Thomas Bodström
- Succeeded by: Morgan Johansson

Minister for Schools
- In office 4 October 1991 – 7 October 1994
- Prime Minister: Carl Bildt
- Preceded by: Göran Persson
- Succeeded by: Ylva Johansson

Member of the Swedish Riksdag for Stockholm Municipality
- In office 3 October 1994 – 31 December 2019
- In office 11 October 1988 – 28 October 1988

Personal details
- Born: Eva Carin Beatrice Ask; 20 April 1956 (age 70) Sveg, Sweden
- Party: Moderate
- Occupation: Politician

Eva Carin Beatrice Ask (born 20 April 1956) is a Swedish politician and a member of the Moderate Party. She served as Governor of Södermanland County from 1 January 2020 to 31 March 2025.

Ask served as a member of the Swedish Riksdag for Stockholm Municipality from 1994 to 2019. She was Minister for Schools from 1991 to 1994 and Minister for Justice from 2006 to 2014.

== Biography ==
Ask was born in Sveg, Jämtland County. She earned a high school diploma in Akron, Ohio, United States, in 1974, and finished her upper secondary school in Sweden in 1976. From 1978 to 1979, she studied international economics at Uppsala University but never graduated. Instead, she began working for the Moderate Party and the Moderate Youth League, before being elected the first female chairman of the youth league in 1984. She was re-elected in 1986, and served a second term until 1988, when she was elected city commissioner with responsibility for schools (Swedish: skolborgarråd) in the city council of Stockholm.

Following the 1991 election, after which Carl Bildt became Prime Minister, Ask was appointed Minister for Schools in the new cabinet. Together with Per Unckel, Minister for Education, she took part in shaking the very foundation of the Swedish education system. Among other things, education vouchers were introduced which allowed children to choose independent schools without paying any fees.

Since the loss in the 1994 election, Ask has served as party spokesman of several issues. From 1994 to 2006, she was member of the Swedish parliament. She was the Chair of the Moderate Women in 1997–2001.

Following the 2006 election, after which Fredrik Reinfeldt became Prime Minister, Ask was appointed Minister for Justice in the new cabinet. Historically, she is one of very few non-jurists to hold the post of minister for justice in Sweden.

She has been criticized by newspapers and fellow politicians in her role as a minister of justice, most notably for her part in the change in legislation regulating the National Defence Radio Establishment, as well as her proposal to send lavender-colored envelopes to suspected purchasers of sexual acts, with the head of the Swedish Bar Association, Anne Ramberg, calling the latter "an unacceptable view of human beings. It is a return to medieval times". After the news of the Swedish police controlling the citizenships of fare evaders in the Stockholm subway, Ask supported the REVA project and continuing in-country foreigner checks. An open letter to the minister describing the more recent public uproar has received worldwide attention, and was carried in the New York Times, written in opposition of police actions in Stockholm.

In January 2014, she shared a link on Facebook to a satirical website article about marijuana killing 37 people in the US following the legalization in the state of Colorado, and tied it to her anti-drug stand as a youth politician. Her post was ridiculed and criticized after it spread on social media. Her press secretary later told the Aftonbladet newspaper that the minister had all the time been aware that the article was satirical.

At the end of her time in office as minister for justice, she was the fourth longest-serving person to the hold the office out of 41 individuals. She was second deputy leader of the Moderate Party from 2009 to 2015.

== Personal life ==
Ask was formerly in a relationship with Moderate Party politician Christer G. Wennerholm, with whom she has one child. She has a second child from another relationship.

Party political offices
Preceded by Gunnar Hökmark	Chairman of the Moderate Youth League; 1984–1988	Succeeded by Ulf Kristersson
Political offices
Preceded by Göran Persson	Minister for Schools; 1991–1994	Succeeded by Ylva Johansson
Preceded by Thomas Bodström	Minister for Justice; 2006–2014	Succeeded by Morgan Johansson
Preceded by Krister Örnfjäder	President by age 2018–2019	Succeeded by Tuve Skånberg
Preceded by Liselott Hagberg	Governor of Södermanland County; 2020–2025	Succeeded by Johanna Sandwall (acting)
