= Anna Wallentheim =

Swedish politician

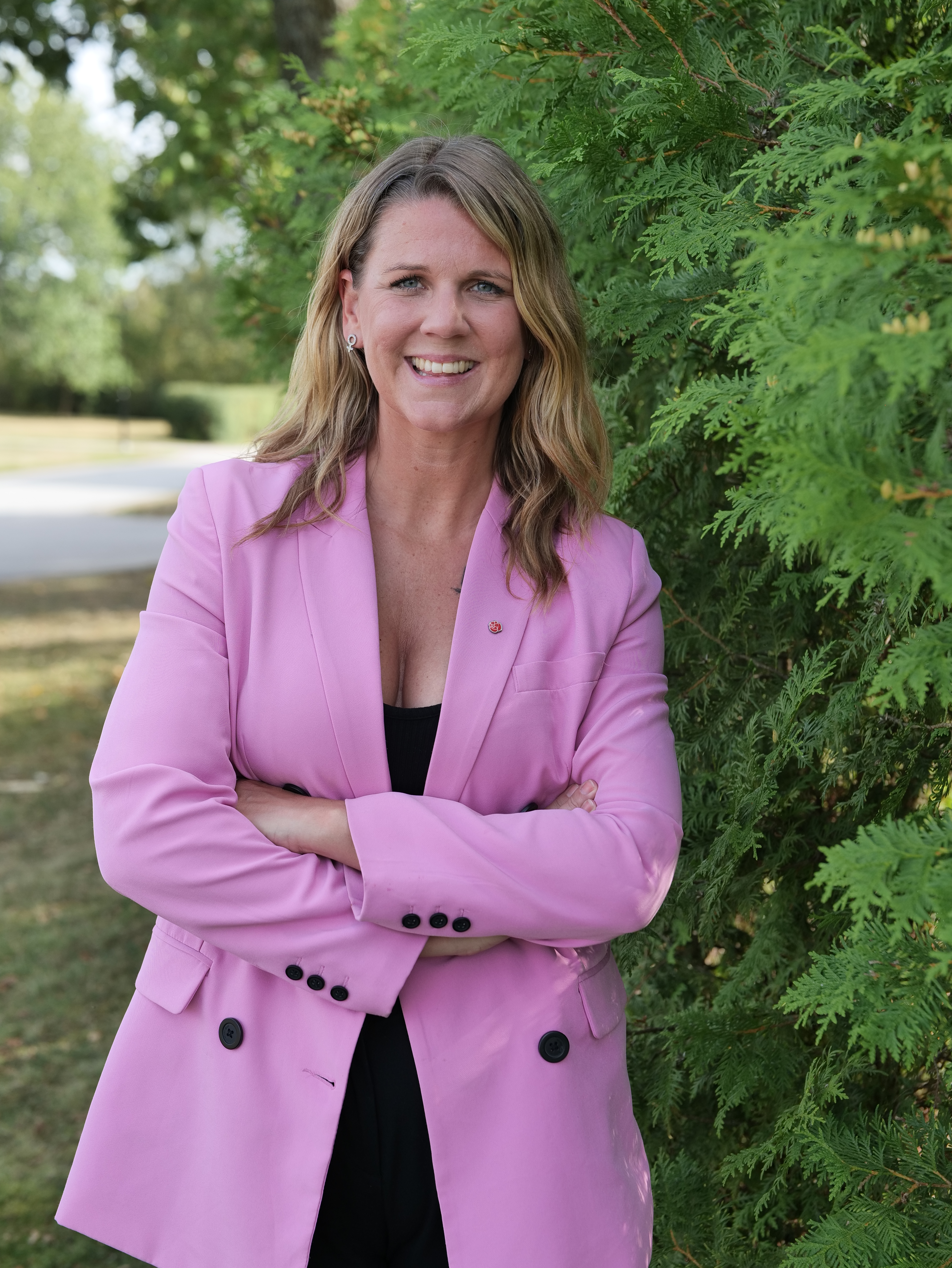
- Anna Wallentheim in 2024

Member of the Riksdag
- In office 2014–2018
- Constituency: Skåne Northern and Eastern

Personal details
- Born: January 16, 1985 (age 41) Tynnered, Gothenburg, Västra Götaland, Sweden
- Party: Social Democrats
- Occupation: Teacher

Anna Wallentheim is a Swedish teacher and politician who serves in the Riksdag with the Social Democrats since 2014.
