= Annelie Karlsson =

Swedish politician (born 1965)

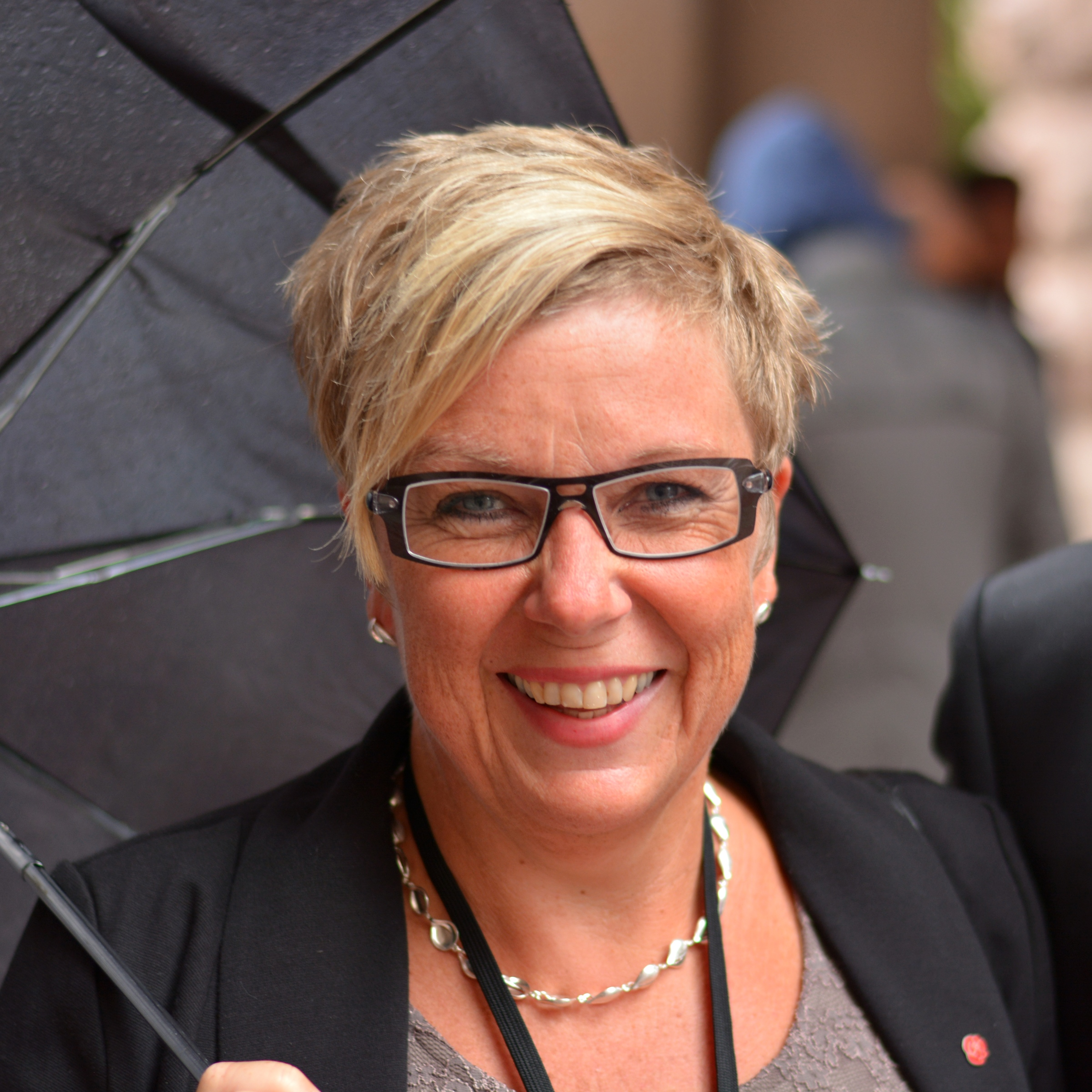

Personal details
- Born: 1965 (age 60–61)
- Occupation: Politician
- Known for: Member of the Riksdag

Annelie Mona Karlsson (born 1965) is a Swedish Social Democratic Party politician who was a Member of the Riksdag for the period 2010–2018, representing the Skåne Northern and Eastern constituency. She is the parliamentary group leader of the SAP in the Riksdag since January 2019, succeeding Anders Ygeman.

She lives in Kristianstad.
