= Ulla Wester =

Swedish politician (born 1953)

Member of the Riksdag
- In office 3 October 1994 – 2 October 2006
- Constituency: Skåne County North and East

Personal details
- Born: 1953 (age 72–73)
- Party: Social Democratic Party

Ulla Wester (born 1953) is a Swedish politician and former member of the Riksdag, the national legislature. A member of the Social Democratic Party, she represented Skåne County North and East between October 1994 and October 2006.
