= Per-Arne Håkansson =

Swedish politician (born 1963)

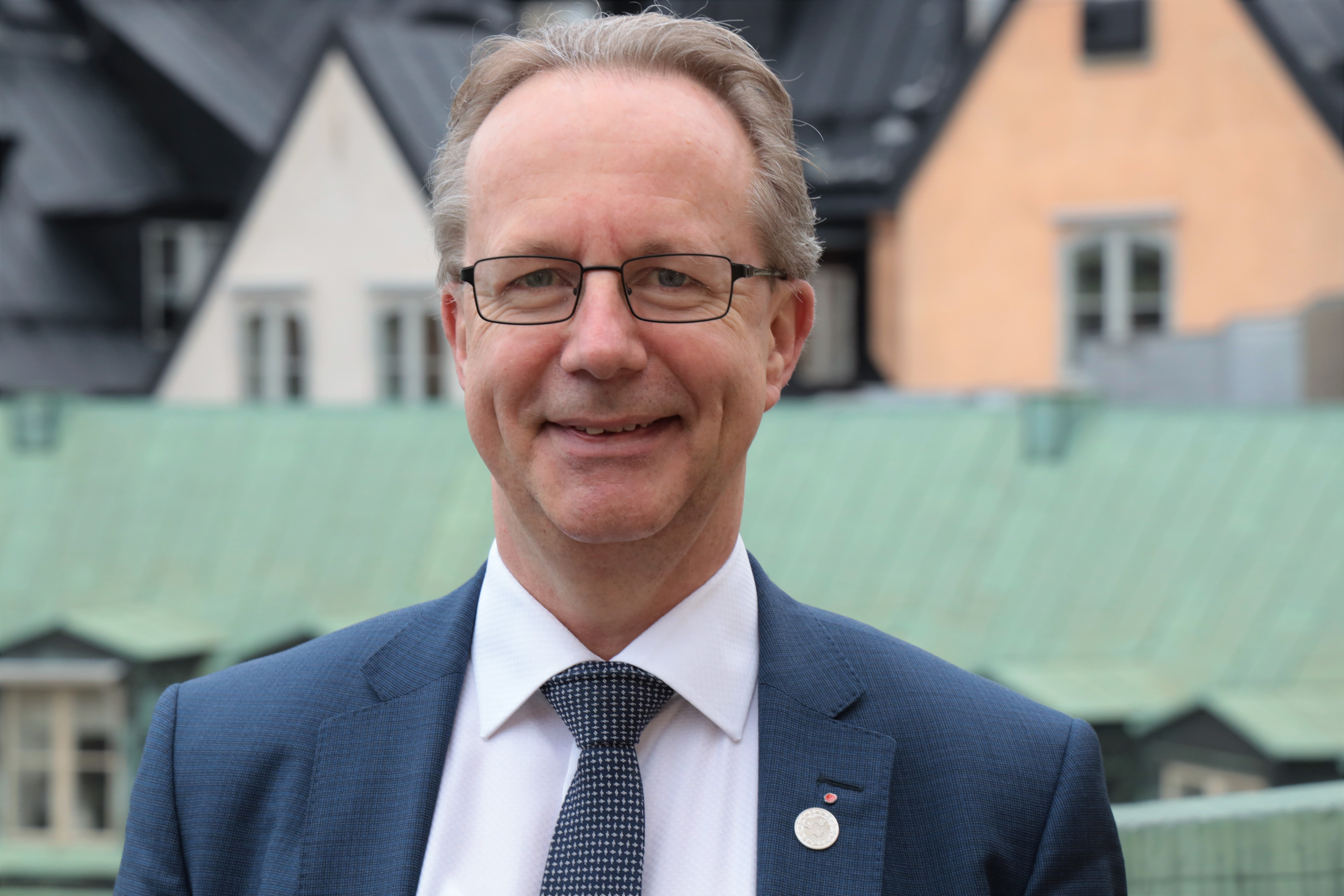
- Håkansson in February 2021

Member of the Riksdag
- Incumbent
- Assumed office 29 September 2014
- Constituency: Skåne County North and East

Personal details
- Born: Per-Arne Mikael Håkansson; 1963 (age 62–63)
- Party: Social Democratic Party

Per-Arne Mikael Håkansson (born 1963) is a Swedish politician, journalist and member of the Riksdag, the national legislature. A member of the Social Democratic Party, he has represented Skåne County North and East since September 2014.

Håkansson is the son of foreman Gert Håkansson and finance assistant Anna-Lisa Håkansson (née Persson). He was a journalist at the Helsingborgs Dagblad (1983) and Arbetet (1983-1999). He was a board member of Sundspärlan AB (2000-2019) and a program manager at Radio FM Helsingborg. He has been a member of the municipal council in Åstorp Municipality since 2008.
