= Ewa Pihl Krabbe =

Swedish politician (born 1947)

Member of the Riksdag
- Incumbent
- Assumed office 26 September 2022
- Constituency: Skåne Northern and Eastern

Personal details
- Born: 1947 (age 78–79)
- Party: Social Democrats

Ewa Pihl Krabbe (born 1947) is a Swedish politician. She was elected as Member of the Riksdag in September 2022. She represents the constituency of Skåne Northern and Eastern. She is affiliated with the Social Democrats.
