= Mikael Eskilandersson =

Swedish politician (born 1977)

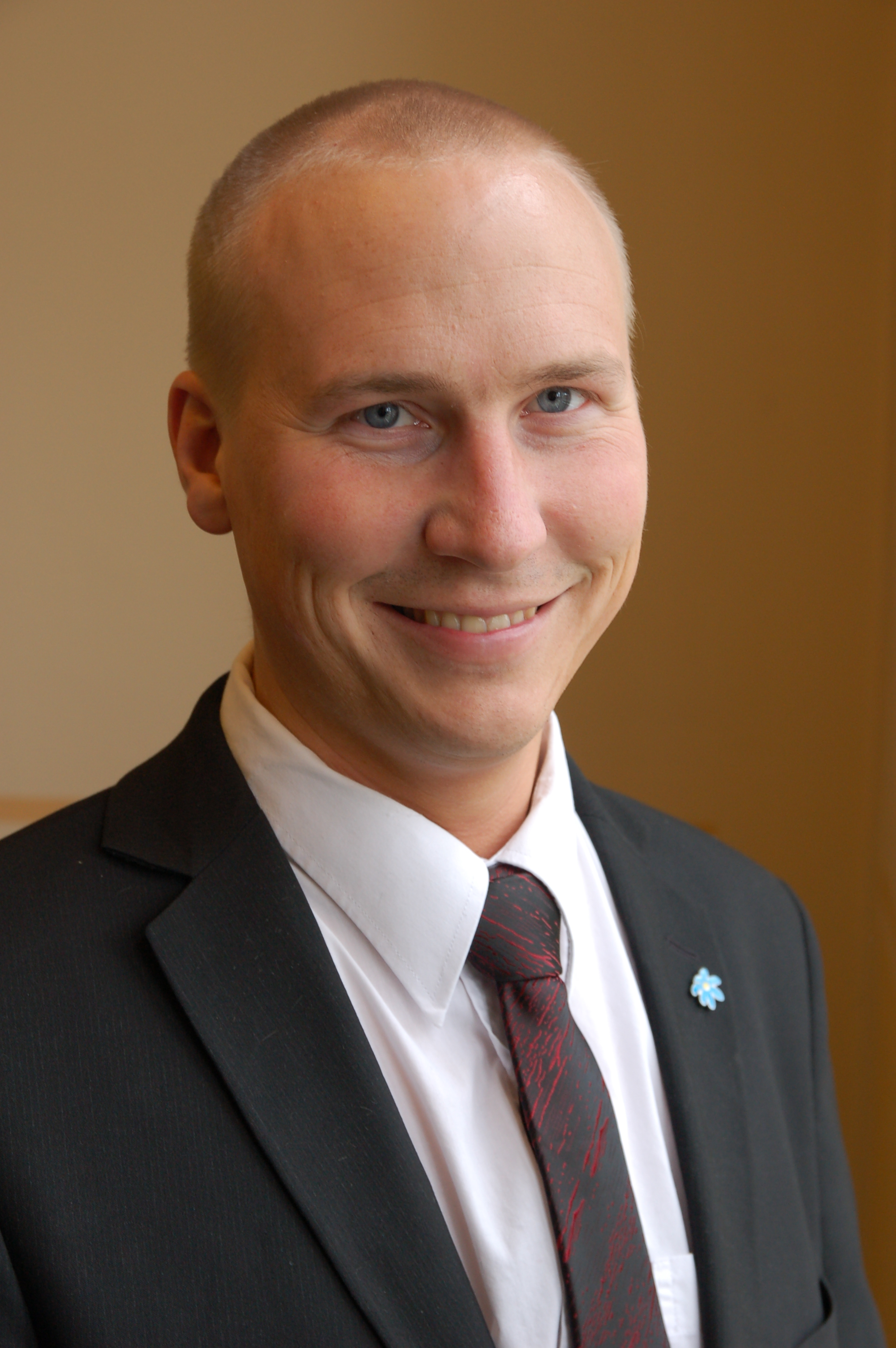

Member of the Riksdag
- Incumbent
- Assumed office 2014
- Constituency: Skåne County North and East

Personal details
- Born: 4 April 1977 (age 49)
- Party: Sweden Democrats

Kent Johan Mikael Eskilandersson (born 1977) is a Swedish politician and a member of the Riksdag for the Sweden Democrats party representing the Skåne County North and East constituency.

Eskilandersson worked in forestry before getting involved in politics. He was elected to the Swedish parliament in 2014, initially for Gävleborg County constituency before contesting Skåne Northern for the 2018 Swedish general election.

In parliament, he has been a member of the civil affairs committee since 2014 and joined the Riksbank's (financial department of the Riksdag) executive committee in 2018.
