= Daniel Lyckestam =

Swedish politician (born 1991)

Member of the Riksdag
- Incumbent
- Assumed office 28 September 2026
- Constituency: Skåne County Northern and Eastern

Personal details
- Born: 2 December 1991 (age 34)
- Party: Moderate Party

Daniel Carl Lennart Lyckestam (né Jönsson; born 2 December 1991) is a Swedish politician who was elected member of the Riksdag in 2026. He has served as deputy mayor of Östra Göinge since 2018.
