= Johnny Ahlqvist =

Swedish politician (born 1948)

Member of the Riksdag
- In office 1985–2000

Personal details
- Born: 4 July 1948 (age 77)

Johnny Ahlqvist, born 4 July 1948, is a Swedish ombudsman and Social Democratic politician.

== Parliamentary career ==
Ahlqvist was a member of parliament from 1985 to 2000, elected in the northern and eastern constituencies of Skåne County.

He was primarily active in the labor market committee, as deputy 1985–91, member 1991-94 and chairman 1994–00. He was also a member of the:

- Social Committee, 1988–91
- EU Committee, 1995-2000
- Interparliamentary Delegation, 1994-00
- Parliamentary Election Committee, 1998-00
- War Delegation, 1994–00

He attended the 2010 wedding of Crown Princess Victoria with Carina Moberg.
