= Ingbritt Irhammar =

Swedish politician (born 1945)

- Born: 31 August 1945; Örkelljunga Parish, Sweden
- Occupations: politician, government official

Ingbritt Irhammar (born 31 August 1945) is a Swedish politician. She is a member of the Centre Party. Irhammar was a member of the Parliament of Sweden between 1985 and 1998. She was the Chair of the Center women in 1993–1998. She was director general of the Swedish Board of Agriculture from 1998 to 2001, after which the Swedish government removed her from the post.
