= Lars-Ivar Ericson =

Swedish politician (born 1948)

Lars-Ivar Ericson (born 23 July 1948) is a Swedish politician. He is a member of the Centre Party. He was a member of the Riksdag from 2002 until 2010.
