= Torsten Elofsson =

Swedish politician (born 1950)

Member of the Riksdag
- Incumbent
- Assumed office 2022
- Constituency: Skåne County Northern and Eastern

Personal details
- Born: 1950 (age 75–76)
- Party: Christian Democrats

Kjell Torsten Elofsson (born 1950) is a Swedish politician from the Christian Democrats. He has been a member of the Riksdag since 2022. He is a retired police officer.

== See also ==
- List of members of the Riksdag, 2022–2026
