= Egon Andreasson =

Swedish politician (1910–1983)

Egon Andreasson (September 17, 1910 – August 22, 1983) was a Swedish politician. He was a member of the Centre Party and member of Swedish parliament (upper chamber) 1969–1970.
