= Bengt Harding Olson =

Swedish politician (1937–2018)

Bengt Harding Olson (21 March 1937 – 14 October 2018) was a Swedish politician who served as an MP from 1985 to 1998.
