= Karl Erik Olsson =

Swedish Centre Party politician

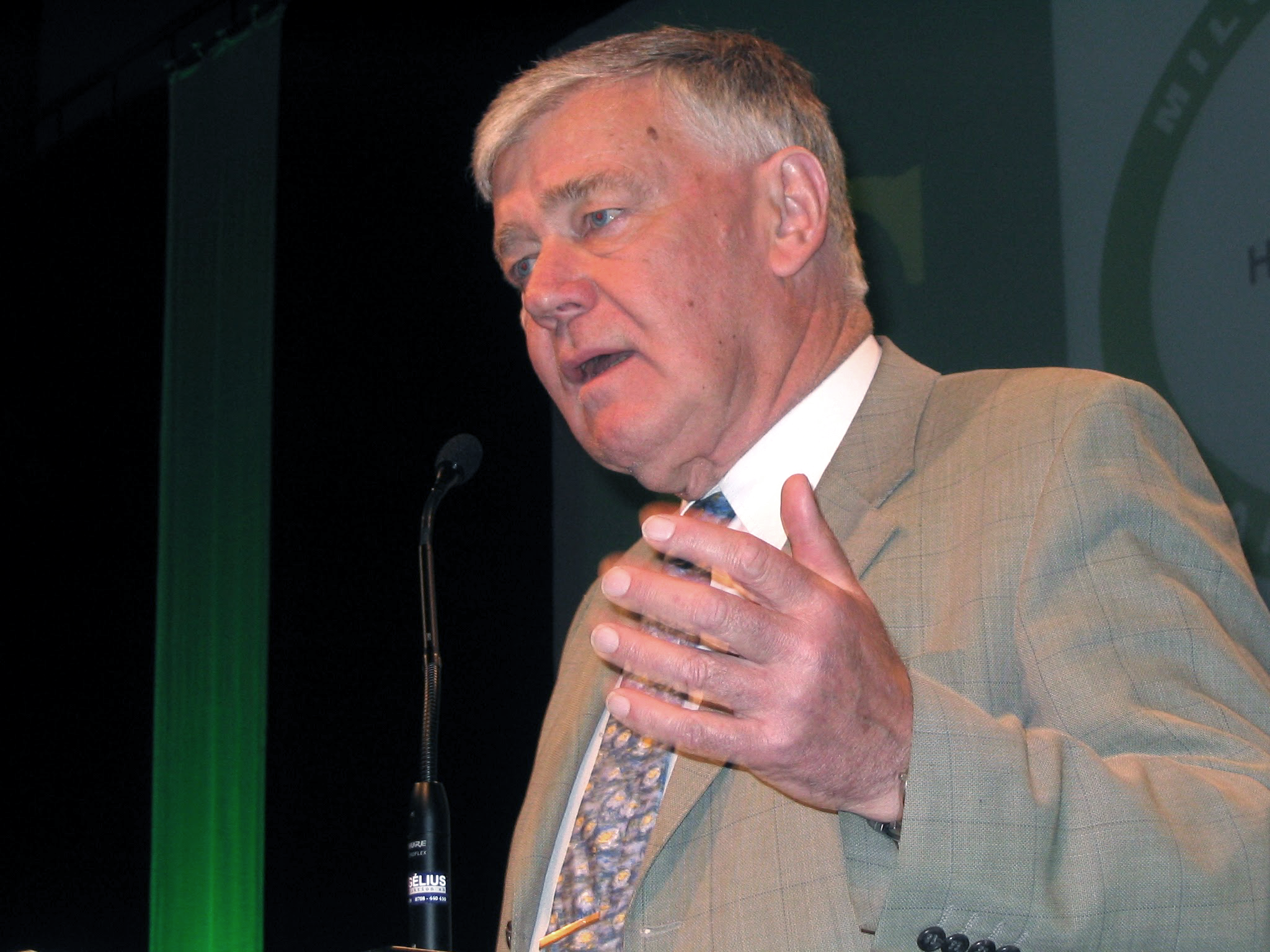
- Olsson at the 2004 Centre Party national meeting in Västerås

Member of the Riksdag
- In office 1976-1979; 1985-1995

Minister for Agriculture
- In office 1991–1994
- Prime Minister: Carl Bildt
- Preceded by: Mats Hellström
- Succeeded by: Margareta Winberg

Member of the European Parliament
- In office 1995–2004
- Constituency: Sweden

Personal details
- Born: 23 February 1938 Helsingborg, Sweden
- Died: 23 January 2021 (aged 82)
- Party: Centre Party

Karl Erik Olsson (23 February 1938 – 23 January 2021) was a Swedish Centre Party politician, Minister for Agriculture, member of the Riksdag and member of the European Parliament.

== Early life and education ==
Olsson was born to the farmer Karl Olsson and Erika Nordström on February 23, 1938, in Helsingborg. He grew up on his family farm in Sösdala where he lived for the rest of his life. He was educated at a realskola and continued his education at an agricultural school.

== Political career ==
Olsson started his career within the Centre Party within the Centre Party Youth organisation, where he was chairman from 1971 to 1974. He was elected to the 1976-1979 Riksdag, and elected again in 1985, remaining for another 10 years until 1995. Between 1991 and 1994 he served as Minister for Agriculture in the Bildt Cabinet. In 1995 he left the Riksdag to become a member of the European Parliament, remaining until 2004.
