= Göran Persson i Simrishamn =

Swedish politician (born 1960)

Göran Persson (born 1960) is a Swedish social democratic politician from the Skåne North and East Constituency, who was a member of the Riksdag between 2002 and 2010. He lost his seat in the 2010 general election.

Persson was referred to as Göran Persson of Simrishamn in the Riksdag between 2002 and 2007 to avoid confusion with the then prime minister Göran Persson, who was referred to as Göran Persson of Stjärnsund after losing the 2006 election and until leaving the Riksdag in April 2007.
