= Gustaf Elofsson =

Swedish politician

- Born: April 5, 1897
- Died: March 12, 1971 (aged 73)
- Occupation: politician
- Years active: 1940–1967
- Known for: Member, Parliament of Sweden (upper chamber)
- Political party: Centre Party

Gustaf Elofsson (April 5, 1897 – March 12, 1971) was a Swedish politician. He was born in Hällaryd, Kronoberg County, and died in Kristianstad County. He was a member of the Centre Party. He was a member of the Parliament of Sweden (upper chamber) from 1940, up until 1967.
