= Sven-Erik Sjöstrand =

Swedish politician (born 1954)

Sven-Erik Sjöstrand (born March 25, 1954), is a Swedish Left Party politician, member of the Riksdag 1998–2006.
