= Ingegerd Wärnersson =

Swedish politician (born 1947)

Helena Ingegerd Wärnersson (née Lundborg; born 19 January 1947) was a Swedish politician of the Swedish Social Democratic Party. She served as Deputy Minister for Education in 1998–2002. She was a Member of the Riksdag in 1988–1991 and 1994–2002. She was governor of Blekinge County in 2002-2008.
