= Parliamentary committees in the Riksdag =

Swedish parliamentary committees

There are fifteen parliamentary committees in the Riksdag, Sweden's parliament. Each committee is made up of seventeen elected MPs, with at least one member from each political party. Additionally, the Committee on European Union Affairs, while not one of the standing committees, has a similar role.

== Current committees ==
Committee on Civil Affairs

The Committee on Civil Affairs was formed on 1 October 2006. This committee overtook issues that were previously handled by the Committee on Civil-Law Legislation and the Committee on Housing. Currently the committee is chaired by Emma Hult of the Green Party, and as vice-Speaker Larry Söder of the Christian Democrats.

Committee on the Constitution

The first Committee on the Constitution was established in the Riksdag of the Estates in May 1809. The committee played a decisive role in bringing about a new Instrument of Government, which was adopted on 6 June 1809. The existence of a Committee on the Constitution and other parliamentary committees was further regulated in the current Instrument of Government from 1974.
The committee prepares matters concerning the Fundamental Laws of the Realm (rikets grundlagar) and the Riksdag Act (riksdagsordningen) and certain other legislation. The current chairman is Karin Enström of the Moderate Party. And as vice-Speaker Hans Ekström of the Social Democratic Party.

Committee on Cultural Affairs

Led by Christer Nylander (Liberals), vice-Speaker Vasiliki Tsouplaki of the Left Party, as of 2019, the second vice-Speaker Lotta Finstorp of the Moderate Party, along with the third vice-Speaker Lawen Redar of the Social Democratic Party.

Committee on Defence

Since 2020 the committee is led by Pål Jonson of Moderate Party, and since 2019 the committee's vice-Speaker is Niklas Karlsson of the Social Democratic Party.

Committee on Education

Social Democrat Gunnilla Svantorp leads the committee, along with vice-Speaker Roger Haddad of the Liberal Party since 2018 and since 2019, the second vice-Speaker Kristina Axén Olin.

Committee on Environment and Agriculture

Chaired currently by Kristina Yngwe (Center Party), along with vice-Speaker Maria Gardfjell for the Green Party, and since 2020 as second vice-Speaker Jessica Rosencrantz of the Moderate Party.

Committee on Finance

The current chair of the committee is Fredrik Olovsson of the Social Democrats. The vice-Speaker of the committee is Elisabeth Svantesson for the Moderate Party.

Committee on Foreign Affairs

The current chairman of the committee is Kenneth G. Forslund of the Social Democrats Since 2019, the vice-Speaker of the committee is Hans Wallmark from the Moderate Party.

Committee on Health and Welfare

Emma Henriksson of Christian Democrats is the committee chairperson, along with vice-Speaker Kristina Nilsson for the Social Democrats.

Committee on Industry and Trade

Current chairman is Lars Hjälmered (Moderate Party) along with vice-Speaker Anna-Caren Sätherberg for the Social Democrats.

Committee on Justice

Established in 1971, the committee considers matters concerning the judicial system, the Penal Code (Brottsbalken), and the Code of Judicial Procedure (Rättegångsbalken). The current speaker of the committee is Fredrik Lundh Sammeli of the Social Democrats along with Andreas Carlson of the Christian Democrats.

Committee on the Labour Market

Anna Johansson of Social Democrats leads the work in the committee, along with vice-Speaker of the committee Gulan Avci from the Liberal Party, and Mats Green of the Moderate Party.

Committee on Social Insurance

Moderate Maria Malmer Stenergard currently chairs the committee, along with vice-Speaker Rikard Larsson of the Social Democrats.

Committee on Taxation

The current chair is Jörgen Hellman of Swedish Social Democratic Party, along with Per Åsling of the Center Party. Since 2019, the second vice-Speaker of the committee Niklas Wykman of the Moderate Party.

Committee on Transport and Communications

Currently chaired by Jens Holm of the Left Party. The vice-Speaker is Anders Åkesson of the Center Party, along with second vice-Speaker Magnus Jacobsson of the Christian Democrats, and third vice-Speaker Teres Lindberg of the Social Democrats.

Joint Foreign Affairs and Defence Committee

Committee on European Union Affairs

In consultation with the government, this committee is responsible for formulating Sweden's policies at the Council of Ministers meetings. The chair of the committee is Åsa Westlund (Social Democrats), since 2019, the vice-Speaker Annika Qarlsson of the Center Party, and second vice-Speaker Jessika Roswall of the Moderate Party.

== History ==
In connection with the introduction of the unicameral parliament in 1971, the committee structure of the Riksdag was changed to a system primarily based on subject-specific committees. Prior to this, the committee structure had been organized according to the functional committee principle, with separate committees for different functions—for example, constitutional legislation (the Committee on the Constitution), general legislation (the Law Committee), taxation (the House Ways and Means Committee), and budget regulation (the Committee of Supply). By the late 1960s, there were a total of 10 standing committees, of which three were law committees; First, Second, and Third. Some of these committees were further divided into two or more sections, each of which drafted proposals for reports that were submitted in the committee’s name after being presented in committee sessions.

From 1971, the Riksdag had 16 standing committees. (Note: The 16 committees were as follows: the Committee on the Constitution, Committee on Finance, Committee on Taxation, Committee on Justice, Committee on Civil-Law Legislation (until 2006), Committee on Foreign Affairs, Committee on Defence, Committee on Social Insurance, Committee on Health and Welfare, Committee on Cultural Affairs, Committee on Education, Committee on Transport and Communications, Committee on Environment and Agriculture, Committee on Industry and Trade, Committee on the Labour Market, and the Committee on Housing (until 2006).) These were, as mentioned, organized according to the subject-specific committee principle, meaning that all matters within a particular policy area are handled by the same committee. Some minor exceptions to this principle exist. The Committee on Civil-Law Legislation, for example, handled legislative matters in civil law regardless of subject area and did not handle appropriation matters. The Committee on the Constitution, the Committee on Finance, and the Committee on Taxation also partially deviate from the subject-specific committee principle, as they have their roots in the old system based on the functional committee principle, which was organized around the distinct functions of the state.

Broadly speaking, the committee structure today remains the same as it was in 1971. The only changes are that the Committee on Home Affairs (Inrikesutskottet) was renamed the Committee on the Labour Market in 1976, and the Committee on Civil Affairs became the Committee on Housing in 1983. In addition, the Committee on Agriculture was renamed the Committee on Environment and Agriculture in 1998. The Committee on Civil-Law Legislation and the Committee on Housing were merge into the newly established Committee on Civil Affairs in 2006. It should also be noted that the structure of government ministries has undergone significant changes during the same period, gradually reducing the correspondence that once existed between the committee structure and the ministerial divisions.

Regarding special committees, since 1971 these have only been appointed on a single occasion—namely in 1992, when the EEA Committee (EES-utskottet) was formed. Joint committees, however, have been relatively common in recent years. Since the parliamentary session of 1995/96, joint committees have occurred in the following combinations: the Joint Foreign Affairs and Defence Committee, the Joint Constitution and Foreign Committee (Sammansatta konstitutions- och utrikesutskottet), and the Joint Foreign and Environment and Agriculture Committee (Sammansatta utrikes- och miljö- och jordbruksutskottet).

While the committee structure has remained largely intact since the 1971 reform, there have been some changes in the scope of matters handled by committees. These changes have generally been minor. They consist partly of adjustments to the division of responsibilities among committees in the Riksdag’s rules of procedure, and partly of reassignments of expenditure areas—where purposes and activities funded by appropriations are transferred from one expenditure area to another, which may shift the preparation responsibility from one committee to another. In some cases (but not always), this also requires amendments to the rules of procedure regarding committee responsibilities. Since 1971, the Riksdag has made such changes to committee responsibilities on about 15 occasions. The largest reassignments have included: consumer issues from the Committee on Industry and Trade to the Committee on Civil-Law Legislation (1983); asylum and migration issues from the Committee on the Labour Market to the Committee on Social Insurance (1983); regional policy from the Committee on the Labour Market to the Committee on Industry and Trade (1998); financial market issues from the Committee on Industry and Trade to the Committee on Finance (1996); and preschool and after-school care from the Committee on Health and Welfare to the Committee on Education (1998). Changes in the expenditure areas of activities in recent years have mainly aimed to align the government’s policy areas (as decided by the government) with the working methods of the Riksdag.

== Former committees ==
There are several committees that no longer meet:

=== Before 1970 ===
- Secret Committee (Sekreta utskottet) (1627–1772)
- Committee on Banking and Currency (1672–1970)
- Committee of Supply (1809–1970)
- Committee of Ways and Means (1809–1970)
- Committee on Miscellaneous Affairs (Allmänna beredningsutskottet) (1954–1970)
- First Law Committee (1918–1970)
- Second Law Committee (1918–1970)
- Third Law Committee (1949–1970)

=== After 1970 ===
- Joint Constitution and Foreign Affairs Committee (Sammansatta konstitutions- och utrikesutskottet) (2001–2008)
- Committee on Civil-Law Legislation (1971–2006)
- Committee on Housing (1983–2006)
- Committee on Home Affairs (Inrikesutskottet) (?–1976) (Note: Renamed the Committee on the Labour Market in 1976.)
- EEA Committee (EES-utskottet) (1992)

== See also ==
- Advisory Council on Foreign Affairs
- War Delegation
