= Committee of Ways and Means (Sweden) =

The Standing Committee of Ways and Means (Note: Standing Committee of Ways and Means; (Br) the Committee of Ways and Means, the Ways and Means Committee; (US; House of Representatives) the House Committee on Ways and Means; (Senate) the Senate Committee on Finance.) (Swedish: Bevillningsutskottet, BevU) was a ways and means parliamentary committee in the Swedish Riksdag from 1809 to 1970. Its main responsibility was taxation and state revenue: it prepared tax legislation, calculated expected revenue from various taxes, and proposed changes in taxation needed to balance the state budget. Its remit gradually expanded to include customs duties, stamp duty, direct and local taxation, and legislation concerning alcoholic beverages.

The committee originated in the taxation bodies of the Age of Liberty and became a permanent institution with the development of the modern Swedish parliamentary system after 1809. Until the parliamentary reform of 1866, it was organized within the framework of the four estates; thereafter, it consisted of members elected by the two chambers of the bicameral Riksdag. In the early twentieth century it generally had 20 members, divided into two sections dealing with different areas of taxation and related matters.

The committee played an important role in Sweden's public finances, particularly through its calculations of state tax revenues and its cooperation with the committees responsible for the state budget. It also had a significant right of initiative in taxation matters, allowing it to propose measures concerning taxes and state revenues. By the mid-twentieth century, the committee had become a central institution for the Riksdag's handling of taxation, customs, and public revenue. Despite proposals to divide its responsibilities between separate committees, it remained a unified body until the parliamentary reforms of 1970, when the Committee of Ways and Means was abolished and replaced by the Committee on Taxation.

== History ==
The Committee of Ways and Means was one of the permanent committees of the Swedish Riksdag. Its task was to prepare matters concerning taxation and bevillning (special taxes/assessments), and to calculate the state's revenues from the various taxes. The committee's functions and organization changed somewhat over time, but its central role was to contribute to the financing of the state and to deal with legislative matters in the field of taxation.

In 1905, the Committee of Ways and Means was one of the Riksdag's five permanent committees and, under § 37 of the Riksdag Act, consisted of 20 members, half of whom were elected by each chamber from among its own members. Alternate members were also appointed. The committee itself elected its chairman and vice-chairman, as well as a secretary from among persons who were not members of the Riksdag. Its work was normally conducted in two divisions. The first dealt primarily with customs and postal matters, while the second handled legislation concerning spirits, other special taxes, and the general tax. Certain matters were dealt with by the committee in plenary session.

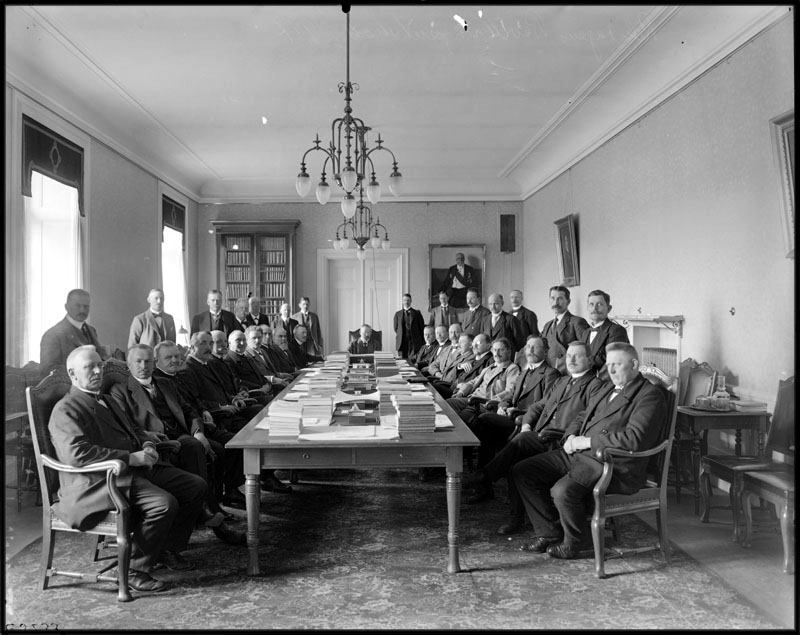
Committee meeting in 1917

Under § 40 of the Riksdag Act, the committee was to prepare matters referred by the chambers concerning changes to the rules governing the imposition of taxes, calculate the revenues from the various taxes, and, once the state's financial needs had been determined, propose how taxation should be increased or reduced in order to balance the state finances. The committee could also, in matters concerning taxation, propose measures that it considered equitable and beneficial. Its revenue calculations formed the basis for the Committee of Supply's budget report. During the first half of the twentieth century, the committee's remit also came to include, among other things, stamp duty legislation, direct taxation, and certain matters relating to local taxation and alcoholic beverages.

The historical roots of the Committee of Ways and Means date back to the Age of Liberty, when there was a special taxation deputation in which the four estates were represented and voting took place by estate. During the eighteenth century, temporary committees were also established to deal with specific taxation matters, including taxation on spirits. At the Riksdag of 1800, a committee explicitly called the Committee of Ways and Means (bevillningsutskott) was appointed for the first time. As the Swedish parliamentary system developed, the committee acquired a more permanent form. Under the 1810 Riksdag Act, it consisted of twelve members from each estate, elected from different parts of the realm. This arrangement remained in place during the period 1809–1866.

Following the 1866 parliamentary reform, when the Riksdag of the Estates was replaced by a bicameral parliament, the Committee of Ways and Means came to consist of members elected by the two chambers. In 1923, it was still one of the Riksdag's seven permanent committees and had 20 members. Its work was then divided between two divisions: one dealt primarily with customs and postal taxes and stamp duty legislation, while the other dealt with direct taxation.

In 1951, the Committee of Ways and Means still consisted of 20 members, half elected by each chamber. By then, its responsibilities had evolved in line with changes in public finance and the tax system. Among other things, the committee was to cooperate with the committees dealing with the state budget and propose how a balance in the state budget could be achieved through taxation. In a report issued toward the end of the parliamentary session, the committee calculated the taxes for the coming fiscal year, including direct national taxes, and proposed, among other things, the rate at which income and property taxes should be levied. It was also responsible for matters concerning local taxes and laws and regulations relating to alcoholic beverages.

Since 1809, the Committee of Ways and Means had possessed extensive powers of initiative in taxation matters, although this right was limited specifically to such matters. Up to the middle of the twentieth century, the committee consequently played a central role in the Riksdag's consideration of taxes, customs duties, and state revenues. Although proposals were made on several occasions to divide its work between two permanent committees in order to make the handling of matters more efficient, the Committee of Ways and Means was retained as a single, unified committee.

The Committee of Ways and Means was abolished in 1970 and replaced by the Committee on Taxation.

== Chairmen ==
- 1817–1818: Fredrik Bogislaus von Schwerin
- 1862–1863: Arvid Posse
- 1867–1867: Gustaf af Ugglas
- 1868–1868: Albert Ehrensvärd
- 1869–1870: Oscar Alströmer
- 1871–1874: Gustaf af Ugglas
- 1875–1882: Alfred Fock
- 1883–1886: Axel Bennich
- 1887–1890: Erik Gustaf Boström
- 1891–1891: Carl Herslow
- 1892–1893: Fredrik Barnekow
- 1894–1910: Henrik Cavalli
- 1911–1911: Alexis Hammarström
- 1912–1917: Karl Gustaf Karlsson
- 1918–1918: Alexis Hammarström
- 1919–1919: Wilhelm Källman
- 1920–1926: Erik Röing
- 1927–1936: Johan Nilsson i Skottlandshus
- 1937–1940: Ivar Anderson
- 1941–1947: Anders Johan Bärg
- 1948–1956: Adolv Olsson
- 1957–1958: Edgar Sjödahl
- 1959–1970: John Ericsson i Kinna

== Deputy chairmen ==
- 1869–1882: Axel Bennich
- 1887A–1887A: Fredrik Hederstierna
- 1887B–1887B: Olof Ahlström
- 1888–1891: Fredrik Barnekow
- 1892L–1892L: Johan Johansson i Noraskog
- 1893–1895: Johan Johansson i Noraskog
- 1900–1902: Henrik Fredholm
- 1903–1906: Jöns Bromée
- 1907–1907: David Bergström
- 1908–1911: Karl Gustaf Karlsson
- 1912–1912: Per Nilsson i Bonarp
- 1912–1914A: Axel Vennersten
- 1914B–1917: Per Nilsson i Bonarp
- 1920–1924: Herman Fleming af Liebelitz
- 1925–1927: Nils Wohlin
- 1928–1939L: Anders Johan Bärg
- 1941–1950: Elon Andersson
- 1952–1956: Filip Kristensson
- 1957–1963: Erik Hagberg
- 1964–1970: Tage Magnusson
