= Christer Nylander =

Swedish politician (born 1968)

Christer Nylander L
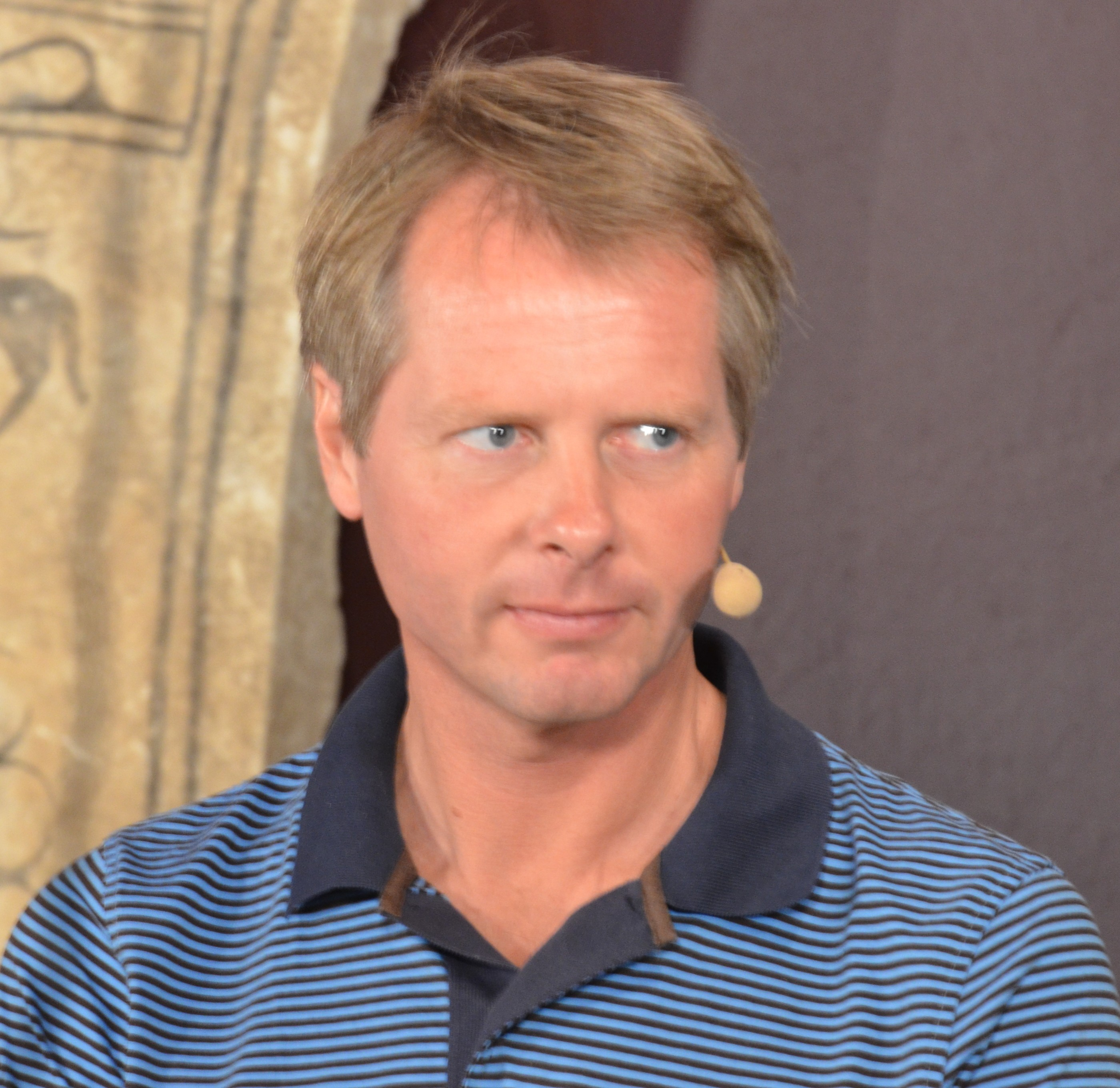
- Nylander in 2016

Member of the Swedish Parliament for Skåne Northern and Eastern
- Incumbent
- Assumed office 2002

Leader of the Liberals in the Riksdag
- In office 7 June 2016 – 28 June 2019
- Leader: Jan Björklund
- Preceded by: Erik Ullenhag
- Succeeded by: Johan Pehrson

Personal details
- Born: 3 October 1968 (age 57)
- Party: Liberals
- Profession: Politician, Author

Lars Christer Stefan Nylander (born 3 October 1968) is a Swedish Liberals Party politician, member of the Riksdag since 2002 for Skåne Northern and Eastern. He was the parliamentary leader from June 2016 until June 2019 for the Liberals Party in the Riksdag. He first joined the Riksdag in 2000 as a replacement for a colleague who left the Riksdag, he has been a regular member of the Riksdag since the 2002 general election. He is currently taking up seat number 188 in the Riksdag for the constituency of Skåne Northern and Eastern. Since the 2018 general election he has been a member and the Speaker of the Cultural Affairs Committee.

== Work in the Riksdag ==
During his time in the Riksdag from 2000 until 2002, while serving as a replacement, he served only as an alternate in the Justice Committee and the Foreign Affairs Committee. He first became a full member of the Finance Committee after the 2002 general election as well as being an alternate for the Taxation Committee.

He kept his positions 2006 general election until October 2007 when he became a member of the Education Committee, he also became an alternate for the Finance Committee until 2008.

He left the Education Committee in 2009 to become a full member of the Cultural Affairs Committee, he also became an alternate for the Education Committee after he left the Committee, he stopped being an alternate for the Education Committee after the 2010 general election. After just a few days in the Cultural Affairs Committee, he became the vice-Speaker of the Cultural Affairs Committee.

In 2013 he left the Cultural Affairs Committee and his position as vice-Speaker of the committee to join the Labour Market Committee.

After the 2014 general election he left the Labour Market Committee to become a member of the Industry and Trade Committee. He was only a member of the committee from October 7 until October 24, 2014. After he left the Industry and Trade Committee he once again joined the Education Committee and became vice-Speaker of the Education Committee.

On 7 June 2016, he became the parliamentary leader for the Liberals Party succeeding Erik Ullenhag, he would hold that position until 28 June 2019, at 16:29, when his successor Johan Pehrson would take over. He was also a member of the War Delegation from 9 June 2016 until 5 September 2019.

After the 2018 general election, Nylander left the Education Committee and his position as vice-Speaker to become a member and the Speaker of the Cultural Affairs Committee. He also became a member of the Nomination Committee (Valberedningen) until 26 September 2019. He was also serving as a member of the Council of Riksdag MPs (Ledamotsrådet) from 10 October 2018 until 12 December of the same year.

== Personal life ==
He is the author behind the books Maktens offer (Sacrifice of power), Olösta mord i Kristianstad (Unsolved murders in Kristianstad), and Den fjärde spelpjäsen (The fourth game piece).

== More literature ==
- Nylander, Christer (2004). Olösta mord i Kristianstad. Kristianstad: Christer Nylander; Visby : Books-on-demand. ISBN 978-91-631-6242-8. OCLC 186682970.
- Nylander, Christer (2005). Den fjärde spelpjäsen. Kristianstad: Christer Nylande. ISBN 978-91-631-7843-6. OCLC 185219832.
- Nylander, Christer (2014). Maktens offer. Stockholm: Halmstad : EA förlag, 2014. ISBN 978-91-87519-25-3. OCLC 940749164.
