= Ways and means committee =

Government body

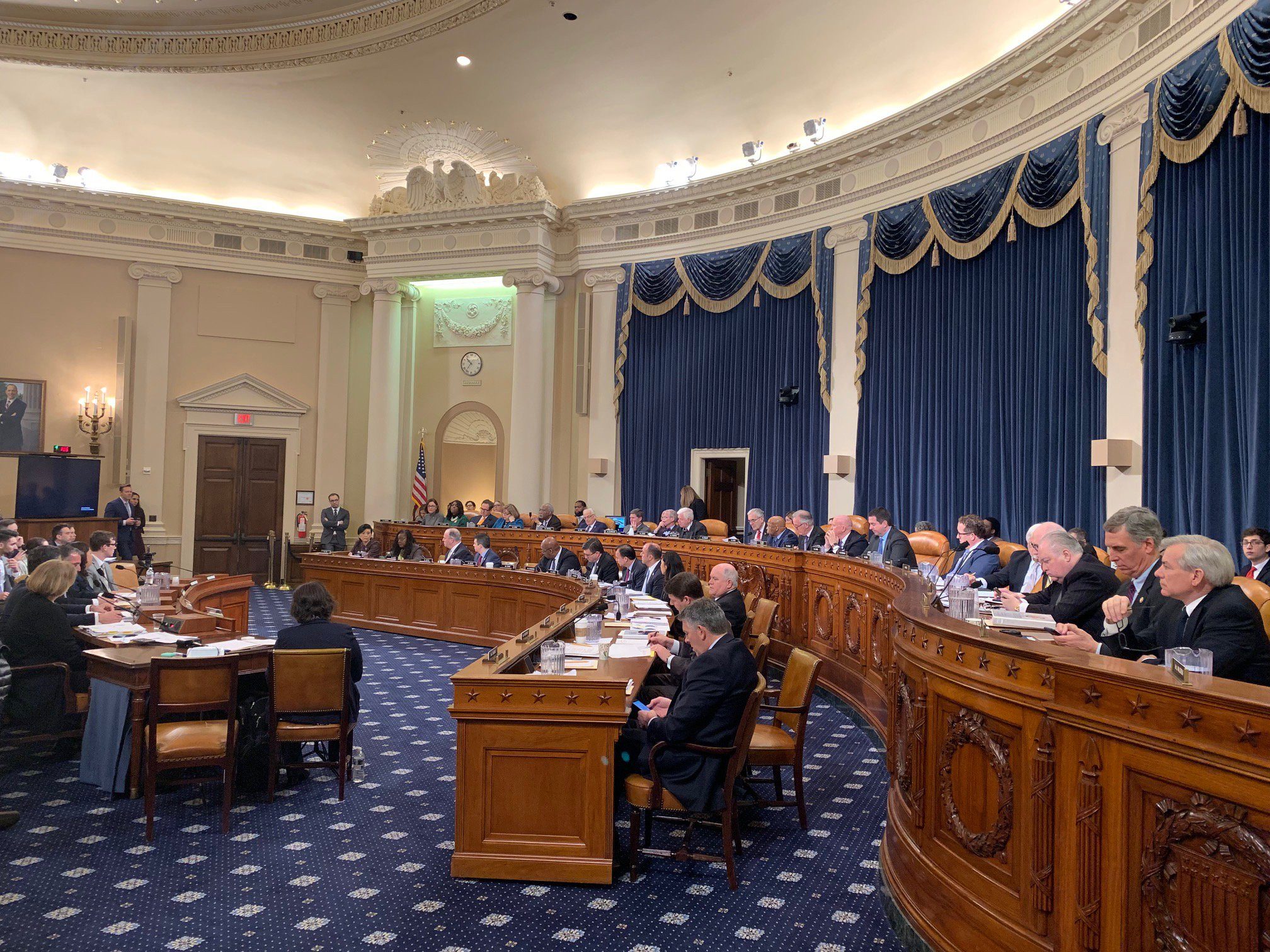
A ways and means committee of the United States Congress.

A ways and means committee is a government body that is charged with reviewing and making recommendations for government budgets. Because the raising of revenue is vital to carrying out governmental operations, such a committee is tasked with finding the ways and means with which to raise that revenue.

The term "ways and means" originated with the Parliament of England and refers to the provision of revenue to meet national expenditure requirements and to implement the objectives of economic policy. The ways and means are provided by the imposition of taxation.

== Canada ==
The Canadian federal government, which follows the British Parliamentary System, also adopted the term "Ways and Means" within its tax system. For example, the Minister of Finance introduces changes to its fiscal plan via a Ways and Means Motion to Amend the Income Tax Act 1985. The Minister tables the motion in Parliament and then presents the budget highlights in a formal budget speech. Only after a federal budget is tabled may the government's detailed taxation plans be made public.

The formal Ways and Means Committee was abolished in Canada in 1968.

== Sweden ==
In Sweden, the Standing Committee of Ways and Means was a permanent committee of the Riksdag from 1809 to 1970. It was responsible for preparing legislation concerning taxation, calculating state revenues, and proposing changes to taxation needed to balance the state budget. Its remit also included customs duties, stamp duty, direct and local taxation, and certain matters concerning alcoholic beverages. Following the 1866 parliamentary reform, the committee consisted of members elected by the two chambers of the bicameral Riksdag. It was abolished in 1970 and replaced by the Committee on Taxation.

== United Kingdom ==
In the Parliament of the United Kingdom, budget resolutions, upon which the fiscal year's Finance Act is based, are in fact Ways and Means resolutions. Ways and Means resolutions are also used to make provision for an increase or decrease in national debt (through the Consolidated Fund or the National Loans Fund).

The Committee of Ways and Means, in effect between 1641 and 1967, was the body responsible for proposing changes in taxation to Government. Any Minister could make proposals to the committee. The Chairman of Ways and Means, an appointed role, presided over the Committee.

The Committee of Ways and Means was abolished in 1967 and the responsibility for all fiscal matters, including taxation, now rests with the Chancellor of the Exchequer. However, the position of Chairman of Ways and Means still exists since the Chairman may take the place of the Speaker in that individual's absence. Traditionally, the title of Chairman of Ways and Means is conferred on the Deputy Speaker of the House. It was formerly an appointed position resulting from a motion tabled at the beginning of each Parliament by the Leader of the House. Following the 6 May 2010 General Election, the Chairman of Ways and Means and his (or her) two deputies were elected by ballot. The Chairman of Ways and Means has two deputies: the First and Second Deputy Chairman of Ways and Means; thus, there are three Deputy Speakers who may take the place of the Speaker.

The Speaker and the deputies do not normally vote, and the Speaker relinquishes association with political parties for the rest of their life. Upon retirement from the service of the House, it is usual for each of these Members to be elevated to a life peerage and thus a seat in the House of Lords upon humble address of the Commons, proposed immediately after the confirmation of the election of the next Speaker.

== United States ==
The United States House Committee on Ways and Means is a committee in the United States House of Representatives similar to that same committee in the United Kingdom House of Commons. Unlike its UK counterpart, the US committee still meets and has jurisdiction over all taxation, tariffs, and other revenue-raising measures, as well as Social Security, Medicare, and a number of other programs.
