= Committee of Supply =

The Standing Committee of Supply (Note: Standing Committee of Supply; (British also) the Select Committee on Estimates; (US) the Committee on Appropriations.) (Swedish: Statsutskottet, StU, SU) was a parliamentary committee in the Swedish Riksdag from 1809 to 1970. It was the central committee of the Riksdag for state expenditures and was responsible for issuing reports on the Swedish government's budget proposal; some appropriations issues were handled by the Committee on Banking and Currency and Committee on Agriculture after 1909.

The Committee of Supply had unrestricted access to all the accounts and documents of the state administration in order to examine, investigate, and report on the financial condition, management, and needs of the state and national debt administration, with certain exceptions. They often consulted with or formed part of the composition of other committees. The Committee of Supply was also responsible for ensuring that disbursements of public funds were made correctly. Otherwise, the committee would make a report to the chambers against the relevant government official.

== History ==
The Committee of Supply was one of the standing committees of the Swedish Riksdag and consisted, according to the Swedish Parliament Act of 1810, of 36 members, 9 from each estate. When two estates stood against two in decisions regarding state regulation and national debt issues, the committee was reinforced with 21 members from each estate, making it composed of 120 members. This so-called reinforced Committee of Supply then had the right to decide on the aforementioned issues with the authority of the Riksdag. In 1948, the committee's members were expanded from 24 to 30 members. In 1969, the committee consisted of 30 members, divided into five departments with six members each. According to § 39 of the Riksdag Act (Riksdagsordningen), the Committee of Supply was to receive the government budget proposal and have access to all government accounts and documents.

The Committee of Supply's powers as the expenditure committee underwent several changes. In 1909, matters concerning the Swedish National Debt Office were transferred to the Committee on Banking and Currency, and the preparation of the respective State Pension System (Pensionsstaten) and the General Retirement Fund (Allmänna indragningsstaten), as well as the main budget heading (huvudtitel) related to agriculture, were transferred to the Committee on Banking and Currency and the Committee on Agriculture. In 1933, the withdrawal accounts were returned to the Committee of Supply, but at the same time, it was relieved of the responsibility for parliamentary and auditing costs as well as the expenses for the Parliament's buildings and facilities, which were instead placed under the Committee on Banking and Currency. The establishment of emergency budgets in 1941 exempted it from the obligation to propose the two credits that would replace them, but as these budgets, like most regular expenditure budgets, fell under the purview of the Committee of Supply, its workload increased. In 1949, the State Pension System was returned to the Committee of Supply. Still, it remained the foremost expenditure committee of the Riksdag, tasked with examining and investigating the state administration's condition and management and proposing what was necessary to meet its needs, with the exceptions mentioned.

The Riksdag Act originally mentioned nothing about the Committee of Supply's jurisdiction over income matters, except that it should specify the amount to be allocated through appropriations. As a result, the Committee of Supply also conducted a calculation of the ordinary revenues, which was explicitly legalized in 1933. To a large extent, it has also, without any provision therefor, been able to express itself on the grounds for regular incomes. There was a committee for financial matters in general and it prepared the proposal for the national budget.

The Committee of Supply ultimately undertook to ensure whether the disbursements of state funds had been in accordance with the national budget, based on the orders issued by the king with proper countersignature and supported by appropriate receipts. In this audit of fund management, the Committee of Supply was guided by the report of the Committee of Public Accounts (Riksdagens revisorer), which had been handed over to it. The Committee of Supply worked in five departments, among which the various main budget headings were divided.

== Chairmen ==
- 1810–1810: Carl Didrik Hamilton
- 1828–1830: Fredrik Bogislaus von Schwerin
- 1853–1854: Carl Åkerhielm
- 1867–1875: Arvid Posse
- 1876–1880: Carl Ekman
- 1881–1882: Emil Key
- 1883–1895: Gustaf Sparre
- 1896–1900: Christian Lundeberg
- 1901–1901: Hugo Tamm
- 1902–1903: Christian Lundeberg
- 1904–1907: Hugo Tamm
- 1908–1912: Gottfrid Billing
- 1913–1914: Fredrik Wachtmeister
- 1915–1917: Carl Swartz
- 1917–1917: Axel Ekman
- 1918–1932: Herman Kvarnzelius
- 1933–1933: N.n.
- 1934–1936: Anders Råstock
- 1937–1939: Petrus Gränebo
- 1940–1940: Anders Råstock
- 1941–1949: Johan Bernhard Johansson i Fredrikslund
- 1950–1960: Martin Skoglund
- 1961–1964: Ernst Staxäng
- 1965–1970: Gösta Bohman

== Deputy chairmen ==
- 1867–1867: Olof Fåhræus
- 1868–1868: Ludvig af Ugglas
- 1869–1874: Fredrik Alexander Funck
- 1875–1875: Jules Stiernblad
- 1879–1880: Johan Nordenfalk
- 1881–1882: Gustaf Sparre
- 1883–1889: Carl Ifvarsson
- 1890–1890: Liss Olof Larsson
- 1891–1891: Sven Nilsson i Everöd
- 1892–1895: Anders Persson i Mörarp
- 1896–1896: Olof Jonsson i Hov
- 1909–1911: Hans Andersson i Västra Nöbbelöv (later Skivarp)
- 1912–1917: Axel Ekman
- 1917–1917: Otto Strömberg
- 1918–1920: Bernhard Eriksson
- 1920–1933: Anders Råstock
- 1934–1934: Felix Hamrin
- 1935–1936: Carl Carlsson i Gävle
- 1940–1940: Per Gustafsson i Benestad
- 1941–1943: Conrad "Conke" Jonsson
- 1944–1947: Algot Törnkvist
- 1948–1948: Ernst Eriksson
- 1949–1956: Karl Ward
- 1957–1957: Gustaf Karlsson
- 1957–1958: Sven Ohlon
- 1958–1968: Emil Näsström
- 1969–1970: Birger Andersson
