= Committee on Civil-Law Legislation =

Swedish parliamentary committee

The (Parliamentary) Committee on Civil-Law Legislation (Note: (Parliamentary) Committee on Civil-Law Legislation or the Standing Committee on Laws.) (Swedish: Lagutskottet, LagU) was a parliamentary committee in the Swedish Riksdag. Its area of responsibility was to bring up questions and policies on the law in Sweden under the period of 1971–2006. Even during the bicameral period, there was a Law Committee (since 1918 there were divided Law Committees for the First Chamber and the Second Chamber, they were called the First Law Committee and the Second Law Committee, in 1949 the Riksdag introduced the Third Law Committee).

During the unicameral Riksdag (the modern Riksdag), the committee was mostly changed in handling civil law issues such as family law, commercial and insurance contract law, company and association law, tort law, intellectual property law (including copyright and patents), bankruptcy law and consumer law. The Law Committee was the only parliamentary committee that did not prepare any budget issues. The last chairman of the committee was 2002-2006 Inger René of the Moderate Party.

On 1 October 2006, the committee was assimilated, along with the Committee on Housing, into the Committee on Civil Affairs.

== List of speakers for the committee ==
Erik Sparre 1850 / 1851 - 1865/ 1866

Name	Period	Political party
Per-Olof Strindberg	1982-1988	Moderate Party
Rolf Dahlberg	1988-1991	Moderate Party
Maj-Lis Lööw	1991-1994	Social Democratic Party
Agne Hansson	1994-1998	Centre Party
Tanja Linderborg	1998-2002	Left Party
Inger René	2002-2006	Moderate Party
