= Michael Anefur =

Swedish politician

Member of the Riksdag
- In office 2018–2022
- Succeeded by: Cecilia Engström
- Constituency: Skåne County West
- In office 2009–2010
- Constituency: Skåne County Northern and Eastern

Personal details
- Born: 1957 (age 68–69) Forshaga, Värmland County, Sweden
- Party: Christian Democrats

Michael Anefur (born 1957) is a Swedish politician, priest and teacher. He was a member of parliament for the Christian Democrats from 2018 to 2022, elected for the Skåne County Western constituency. He was also a member of parliament from 2009 to 2010. He was a member of the Committee on the Labour Market and the party's labour market policy spokesperson from 2021 to 2022. He was previously a member of the Committee on Health and Welfare from 2018 to 2021. He has also been the national homelessness coordinator from 2012 to 2014, appointed by the Reinfeldt government.

== Biography ==
Anefur received a Bachelor of Theology degree in 1980 and worked as a priest in the Church of Sweden from 1982 to 1992. He then worked as a folk high school teacher from 1992 to 2002.

Anefur has been active in local politics in Kristianstad Municipality, where he was a member of the municipal council from 1991 to 2006, and group leader for a period, as well as a member of the municipal board from 1991 to 2006.

He was a growth councilor in Kristianstad during the 2002–2006 term, when his party in Kristianstad Municipality was in coalition with the Social Democrats and the Green Party. He was then the managing director of Renhållningen in Kristianstad from 2006 to 2009. Anefur was also a substitute member of the Christian Democrats' party board from 1999 to 2001. He is also a member of the party's municipal policy council.

From 1998 onwards, he was the first deputy in the Riksdag for his party on the Skåne County Northern and Eastern constituency parliamentary bench. On 14 July 2009 he became a member of the Riksdag after his party colleague Alf Svensson became a Member of the European Parliament and resigned as a member of the Riksdag. He was a member of the Riksdag until October 2010.

In the 2018 Swedish general election, he was again elected as a member of the Riksdag, this time elected for the Skåne County Western constituency. He was a member of the Committee on Health and Welfare from 2018 to March 2021, and was also the party's social policy spokesperson. In January 2020, Anefur took a leave of absence from the Riksdag until August 2020 due to illness and was replaced by Cecilia Engström. He was a member of the Committee on the Labour Market from March 2021 and the party's labour market policy spokesperson.

Anefur was the national homelessness coordinator from 1 January 2012 to 2014, and was tasked with supporting municipalities in their work to combat homelessness.

He ran in the 2014 European Parliament election in third place on the Christian Democrats party list.

== See also ==
- List of members of the Riksdag, 2006–2010
- List of members of the Riksdag, 2018–2022
