= Linderborg =

Linderborg is a Swedish surname. Notable people with the surname include:

- Åsa Linderborg (born 1968), Swedish writer, columnist and historian
- Tanja Linderborg (1943–2023), Swedish politician
