= Committee on the Constitution =

Swedish parliamentary committee

The [Parliamentary] Committee on the Constitution (Swedish: Konstitutionsutskottet, KU) is a parliamentary committee in the Swedish Riksdag. The committee's responsibilities include examining issues relating to the Swedish Constitution and Administrative laws, as well as examining the Prime Minister's performance of duties and the handling of government matters. The committee's activities are regulated by the Riksdag.

Given the committee's significant power, it has been agreed since 1991 that the Speaker of the committee shall come from the opposition party. Since October 2026, the Speaker of the committee has been Oscar Sjöstedt from the Sweden Democrats, and the vice-Speaker of the committee is Jennie Nilsson from the Social Democratic Party.

The committee is made up of seventeen elected members of the Riksdag with representation from all political parties.

== History ==
The first Swedish legislative committee founded for the purpose of watching over the constitution was in May 1809, at the time of the Riksdag of the Estates. The committee played an important role in the development of the new form of government that was adopted on 6 June in the same year. The first Speaker of the committee was Lars August Mannerheim, and the first Secretary of the committee was Hans Järta.

The committee was permanently established by the Instrument of Government, §53, in 1809, which describes the committee's function:

To bring issues concerning changes in the constitutions and opinions thereof to the attention of the estates of the state, and to review the minutes kept by the Government

Its tasks are similarly set out by §§ 105-107 of the Riksdagsstadgan (parliamentary rules):

The principal function remains unchanged, but a function has to adapt itself to modern society's conditions and the change in state.

== Tasks ==
The Constitution Committee shall examine the performance of the duties of the Prime Minister and the handling of government matters. The committee has the right to obtain for review the minutes of decisions in government matters, documents that belong to these matters, and the government's other documents that the committee finds necessary for its review. Other committees and each member of the Riksdag may raise questions in writing with the Constitution Committee about the Minister's performance of duties or the handling of government matters. Law: (2010: 1408).

— Kungörelse (1974:152),

The concerns of the Committee on the Constitution are the Swedish constitutions and the Riksdag's rules of procedure, and the committee is an important element of the Riksdag's power. The committee oversees legislation on the constitution and administrative law; on television, radio and film; press and party support; the Riksdag, offices in the Riksdag, such as the National Audit Office and the Ombudsman (but not the Riksbank); review of government ministers; freedom of the press and expression; municipal self-government; opinion formation; and freedom of religion.

The Committee submits so-called KU-anmälningar (Constitutional Committee reports). The ongoing review is presented annually in a report, called the review report, formerly known as the "discharge report" (Swedish: dechargebetänkandet). When a report about a person is sent to the committee, a hearing is then held. Since 1988, the public has been allowed to witness these hearings. It is common for the committee to criticize a government minister after a hearing, resulting in a vote of no confidence. The committee also has the last word in certain deliberations prior to a Riksdag decision.

=== Impeachments ===
If impeachment should proceed against a government minister, it would be the Committee that decides this. The case would then go to Sweden's Supreme Court. The last time a minister was impeached in Sweden was during the mid-1800s, under the now-defunct impeachment law (Riksrätt).

== List of chairmen for the committee ==
=== Chairmen before 1971 (bicameral Riksdag) ===
- 1809/1810: Lars August Mannerheim
- 1823: Baltzar von Platen
- 1828/1830: Lars August Mannerheim
- 1834/1835: Jakob Cederström
- 1840/1841: Carl Henrik Anckarsvärd
- 1851–1858:Gustaf Lagerbjelke
- 1859/1860, 1862/1863, 1867/1871: Thomas Munck af Rosenschöld
- 1871 (urtima Riksdag): Gustaf af Ugglas
- 1872/1875: Thomas Munck af Rosenschöld
- 1876–1887B: Magnus Hallenborg
- 1888:Gunnar Wennerberg
- 1888–1898: Oscar Bergius
- 1899: Gustaf Åkerhielm
- 1900–1901: Gustaf Rudebeck
- 1902–1905 (Lagtima riksdagen): Hugo Blomberg
- 1906–1908: Hugo Blomberg
- 1909–1910: Karl Staaff
- 1911: Ernst Trygger
- 1912: Carl Carlsson Bonde
- 1912: Theodor af Callerholm
- 1913–1917: Nils Edén
- 1918: Otto Mannheimer
- 1918 (urtima Riksdag): Jakob Pettersson
- 1919 (urtima Riksdag): Jakob Pettersson
- 1919 (urtima Riksdag)–1921: Viktor Larsson in Västerås
- 1922–1923: Sam Clason
- 1924: Viktor Larsson in Västerås
- 1925–1929: Knut von Geijer
- 1930–1938: Carl Axel Reuterskiöld
- 1939 (lagtima riksdagen)–1958 (B): Harald Hallén
- 1959–1964: Bengt Elmgren
- 1965–1972: Georg Pettersson

=== After 1971 (unicameral Riksdag) ===
Name	Period	Political party
Hilding Johansson	1972–1976	Social Democratic Party
Karl Boo	1976–1979	Centre Party
Bertil Fiskesjö	1979–1982	Centre Party
Olle Svensson	1982-1991	Social Democratic Party
Thage G. Peterson	1991–1994	Social Democratic Party
Birgit Friggebo	1994–1997	Liberal People's Party
Bo Könberg	1997–1998	Liberal People's Party
Per Unckel	1998-2002	Moderate Party
Gunnar Hökmark	2002-2004	Moderate Party
Göran Lennmarker	2004–2006	Moderate Party
Berit Andnor	2006–2010	Social Democratic Party
Peter Eriksson	2010–2014	Green Party
Andreas Norlén	2014–2018	Moderate Party
Hans Ekström	2018–2019	Social Democratic Party
Karin Enström	2019–2022	Moderate Party
Hans Ekström	2022	Social Democratic Party
Ida Karkiainen	2022–2025	Social Democratic Party
Jennie Nilsson	2025–2026	Social Democratic Party
Oscar Sjöstedt	2026–	Sweden Democrats

== List of vice-chairmen for the committee ==
=== Vice-chairmen before 1971 (bicameral Riksdag) ===
- Johan Sjöberg 1869
- Lars Johan Hierta 1871U
- Pehr von Ehrenheim 1872 -1973
- Magnus Hallenborg 1874 - 1875
- Johan Sjöberg 1876 - 1878
- Johan Nordenfalk 1879 - 1880
- Adolf Erik Nordenskiöld 1884 - 1885
- Per Siljeström 1886
- Axel Ljungman 1887A
- Johan Sjöberg 1887B
- Axel Ljungman 1891 - 1899
- Fredrik Barnekow 1900 - 1905L
- Gullbrand Elowson 1905 1U - 1906
- Theodor af Callerholm 1907 - 1909
- Johan Fredrik Nyström 1910
- Theodor af Callerholm 1911
- Hjalmar Branting 1912 - 1914A
- Sam Clason 1914B - 1917
- Viktor Larsson in Västerås 1918L - 1918U
- Sam Clason 1919 - 1921
- Arthur Engberg 1922 - 1923
- Knut von Geijer 1925
- Arthur Engberg 1926 - 1928
- Harald Hallén 1933 - 1938
- Anton Pettersson 1939L - 1939U
- Gustaf Adolf Björkman 1940 - 1940U
- Jones Erik Andersson 1941 - 1951
- John Pettersson 1952 -1960
- Torsten Andersson 1961 - 1968
- Gunnar Larsson 1969 - 1971

=== After 1971 (unicameral Riksdag) ===
Name	Period	Political party
Gunnar Larsson	1972–1974	Centre Party
Karl Boo	1974–1976	Centre Party
Hilding Johansson	1976–1982	Social Democratic Party
Anders Björck	1982–1991	Moderate Party
Bertil Fiskesjö	1991-1994	Centre Party
Kurt Ove Johansson	1994–1998	Social Democratic Party
Göran Magnusson	1998–2006	Social Democratic Party
Per Bill	2006–2014	Moderate Party
Björn von Sydow	2014–2018	Social Democratic Party
Marta Obminska	2018–2019	Moderate Party
Hans Ekström	2019–2022	Social Democratic Party
Karin Enström	2022	Moderate Party
Erik Ottoson	2022–2024	Moderate Party
Louise Meijer	2024–2025	Moderate Party
Mats Green	2025–2026	Moderate Party
Jennie Nilsson	2026–	Social Democratic Party
