= Gunnar Larsson =

Gunnar Larsson may refer to:

- Gunnar Larsson (swimmer) (born 1951), former medley swimmer from Sweden
- Gunnar Larsson (cross-country skier) (born 1944), Swedish cross-country skier
- Gunnar Larsson (politician) (1908–1996), Swedish politician
- Gunnar Larsson (sports administrator) (1940–2020), Swedish sports administrator and politician
