= Forsell =

Forsell or Forssell is a Swedish surname. Notable people with the surname include:

- Carl Forssell (1917–2005), Swedish fencer
- Daniel Forsell (born 1982), Swedish football defender
- Elisabeth Forsell (fl. 1747), Swedish weaver
- Erik Forssell (born 1982), Swedish professional ice hockey player
- Gry Forssell (born 1973), Swedish television host
- Hans Forssell (1843–1901), Swedish historian and political writer
- Harry Forssell (1907–2006), Olympic swimmer from Brazil
- Johan Forssell (politician, born 1855) (1855–1914), Swedish politician
- Johan Forssell (politician, born 1979) (born 1979), Swedish politician
- John Forsell (1868–1941), Swedish opera singer
- Kyllikki Forssell (1925–2019), Finnish actress
- Lars Forssell (1928–2007), Swedish writer
- Mikael Forssell (born 1981), Finnish football striker
- Petteri Forsell (born 1990), Finnish footballer
- William Forsell Kirby (1844–1912), English entomologist
