= Law Committee =

Law Committee may refer to:

- Committee on Civil-Law Legislation, in Sweden
- Law Committee (French National Assembly)
- Personnel, Public Grievances, Law and Justice (Parliament of India)
