= Committee on Housing =

The (Parliamentary) Committee on Housing (Swedish: Bostadsutskottet, BoU) was a parliamentary committee in the Swedish Riksdag up until 2006. The committee prepared, among other things, policies about housing and about land tenure, dwelling policies, water law, planning of buildings, physical planning, property development and surveying, as well as matters concerning the national administrative division and such municipal issues that do not belong to any other committee's preparation area.

On 1 October 2006, the committee was assimilated, along with the Committee on Civil-Law Legislation, into the Committee on Civil Affairs.

The last speaker of the committee was Ragnwi Marcelind for the Christian Democrats serving from 2004 until 2006.

== List of speakers for the committee ==
Name	Period	Political party
Agne Hansson	1987–1994	Centre Party
Knut Billing	1994–2002	Moderate Party
Göran Hägglund	2002–2004	Christian Democrats
Ragnwi Marcelind	2004–2006	Christian Democrats

== See also ==
- Sveriges bostadspolitik

== Notes ==
- Bostadsutskottet (BoU) (archived) riksdagen.se (original) 11 December 2005
