= Committee on Banking and Currency =

The Committee on Banking and Currency could refer to:

- the Swedish Standing Committee on Banking and Currency, which existed from 1672 to 1970.
- the United States House Committee on Banking and Currency, which existed from 1865 to 1968.
- the United States Senate Committee on Banking and Currency, which existed from 1913 to 1970.
