= Committee on Civil Affairs =

Swedish parliamentary committee

The (Parliamentary) Committee on Civil Affairs (Swedish: Civilutskottet, CU) is a parliamentary committee in the Swedish Riksdag that was founded on 1 October 2006, with the merger of the Committee on Civil-Law Legislation and the Committee on Housing. The committee's areas of responsibility concern housing policy, consumer policy, community planning, and civil law.

When the committee was founded it was the largest reorganization of the Swedish Parliament since the abolishment of the bicameral Riksdag in 1971.

== List of speakers for the committee ==
Name	Period	Political party
Carina Moberg	2006–2010	Social Democratic Party
Maryam Yazdanfar	2010–2011	Social Democratic Party
Carina Ohlsson	2011	Social Democratic Party
Veronica Palm	2011–2014	Social Democratic Party
Caroline Szyber	2014–2016	Christian Democrats
Tuve Skånberg	2016–2017	Christian Democrats
Caroline Szyber	2017–2018	Christian Democrats
Emma Hult	2018–2022	Green Party
Malcolm Momodou Jallow	2022–	Left Party

== List of vice-speakers for the committee ==
Name	Period	Political party
Inger René	2006–2010	Moderate Party
Jan Ertsborn	2010–2012	Liberal People's Party
Nina Lundström	2012–2014	Liberal People's Party
Johan Löfstrand	2014–2015	Social Democratic Party
Hillevi Larsson	2015	Social Democratic Party
Johan Löfstrand	2015–2017	Social Democratic Party
Hillevi Larsson	2017	Social Democratic Party
Johan Löfstrand	2017–2018	Social Democratic Party
Larry Söder	2018–2022	Christian Democrats
Mikael Eskilandersson	2022–	Sweden Democrats
