= Niklas Wykman =

Swedish politician and economist

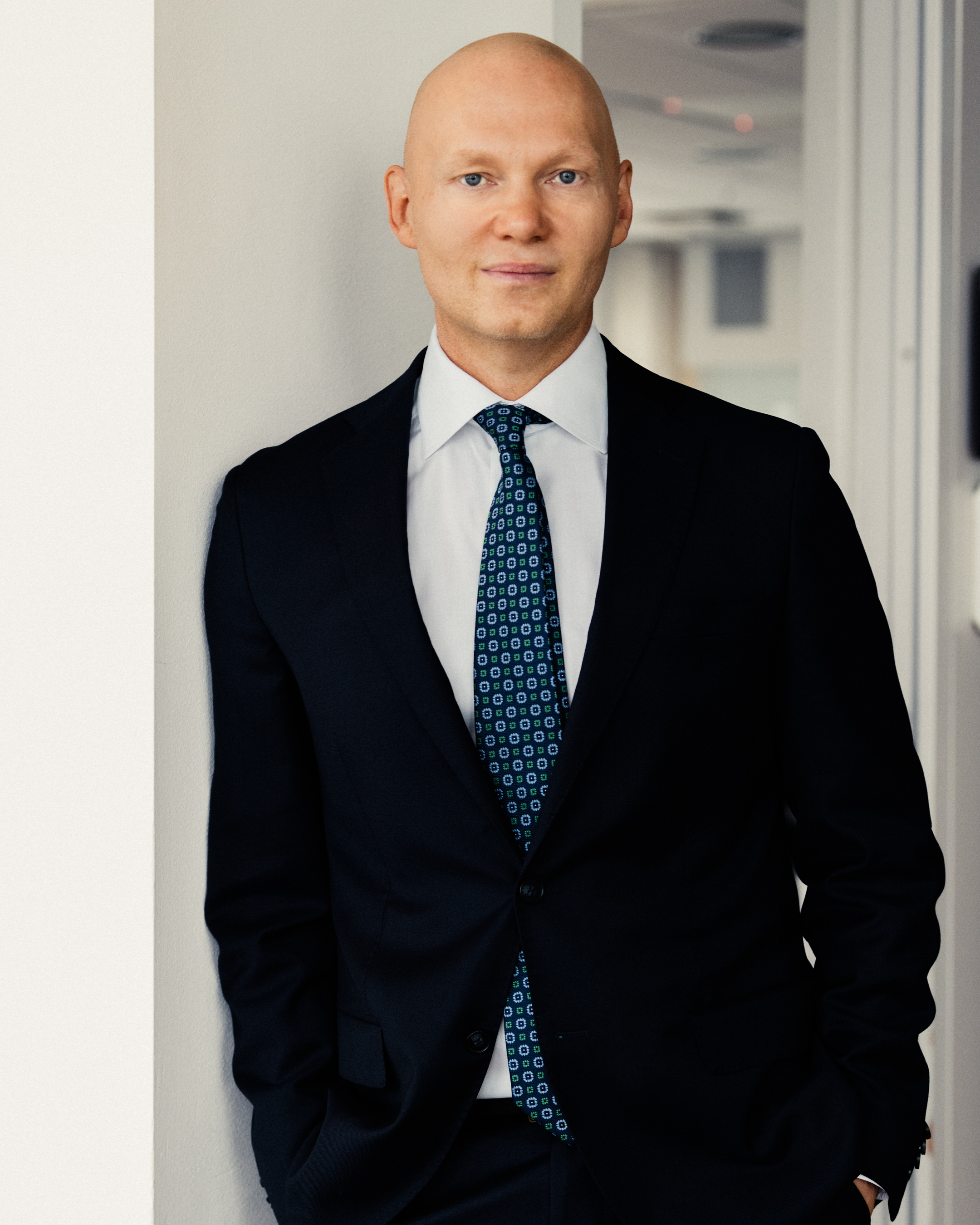
- Wykman in 2025

Minister for Financial Markets
- Incumbent
- Assumed office 18 October 2022
- Prime Minister: Ulf Kristersson
- Preceded by: Max Elger

Member of the Riksdag
- Incumbent
- Assumed office 29 September 2014
- Constituency: Stockholm County

Chairman of the Moderate Youth League
- In office 25 November 2006 – 27 November 2010
- Preceded by: Johan Forssell
- Succeeded by: Erik Bengtzboe

Personal details
- Born: Niklas Åke Wykman; 10 March 1981 (age 45) Kalmar, Sweden
- Party: Moderate Party
- Education: Stockholm University; Örebro University
- Occupation: Politician, economist

Niklas Åke Wykman (born 10 March 1981) is a Swedish politician and economist of the Moderate Party. He has served as Minister for Financial Markets in the government of Ulf Kristersson since 18 October 2022.

Wykman has been a member of the Riksdag for the Stockholm County constituency since 2014. He has been on leave from the Riksdag since his appointment as a government minister in October 2022. He was chairman of the Moderate Youth League from 2006 to 2010.

== Early life and education ==
Wykman was born in Kalmar on 10 March 1981. He attended the natural sciences programme with a social sciences specialisation at Jenny Nyströmsskolan in Kalmar from 1997 to 2000.

Between 2002 and 2012, he studied economics, mathematics and mathematical statistics at Stockholm University. He subsequently received a master's degree in economics from Örebro University, where he undertook doctoral studies in economics from 2013 to 2026.

On 16 January 2026, Wykman successfully defended his doctoral thesis, Essays on Taxation and Entrepreneurship, at Örebro University. His research has focused primarily on taxation, entrepreneurship and the taxation of owners of closely held companies.

== Political career ==
=== Early political work ===
Wykman joined the Moderate Youth League in 1997. He served as chairman of the Moderate School Youth, the league's organisation for secondary-school students, from 2000 to 2001. He also worked as a political secretary in Upplands Väsby Municipality from 2001 to 2002.

During the 2003 Swedish euro referendum, Wykman worked for Medborgare mot EMU, a centre-right organisation that campaigned against Sweden adopting the euro.

=== Chairman of the Moderate Youth League ===
Wykman was elected chairman of the Moderate Youth League at its congress in Sollentuna on 25 November 2006. He defeated the nomination committee's candidate, Mattias Thorsson, by 63 votes to 49.

He succeeded Johan Forssell and led the organisation until 2010, when he was succeeded by Erik Bengtzboe.

Following his departure from the youth league, Wykman worked as a political adviser at the Ministry of Finance from 2010 to 2014.

=== Member of the Riksdag ===
Wykman was elected to the Riksdag in the 2014 Swedish general election, representing Stockholm County. He served as an ordinary member from 29 September 2014 until his appointment as a minister on 18 October 2022. He was re-elected in the 2018 and 2022 general elections. Since becoming a minister, he has formally remained a member of the Riksdag but has been on leave, with a substitute member serving in his place.

During his first parliamentary term, Wykman served on the Committee on European Union Affairs from 2014 to 2015, the Committee on Taxation from 2015 to 2016 and the Committee on the Labour Market from 2016 to 2017. He was a member of the Committee on Finance from 2017 to 2019.

From 2019 until 2022, he was second deputy chair of the Committee on Taxation. He briefly returned as an ordinary member of the committee in 2022 before entering the government.

=== Minister for Financial Markets ===
On 18 October 2022, Wykman was appointed Minister for Financial Markets in the government of Prime Minister Ulf Kristersson, succeeding Max Elger.

As minister, Wykman's responsibilities have included financial markets, financial stability and gambling policy. His portfolio has included measures concerning banking and payment security, consumer protection in financial services, money laundering, the Swedish capital market and the financing of new nuclear power projects.

== Political positions and public statements ==
In June 2010, following the Gaza flotilla raid, Wykman wrote on Facebook that he was relieved that Hamas would not receive the visitors it had expected. He described the failure of the flotilla to reach Gaza as a victory and referred to participants in Ship to Gaza as useful idiots and terrorists who were ideologically motivated to destroy Israel.

The comments were criticised by politicians from several parties. Prime Minister Fredrik Reinfeldt, who was also leader of the Moderate Party, distanced himself from Wykman's wording and emphasised the humanitarian motives of people participating in the initiative.

== Selected publications ==
- Wykman, Niklas. Essays on Taxation and Entrepreneurship. Örebro University, 2026.
- Johansson, Dan; Stenkula, Mikael; and Wykman, Niklas. "Taxation of Swedish Owner-Entrepreneurs, 1862 to 2018".
- Wykman, Niklas. "Capital Taxation of Owners of Closely Held Corporations in Sweden, 1991 to 2018".

Party political offices
| Preceded by Johan Forssell | Chairman of the Moderate Youth League; 2006–2010 | Succeeded by Erik Bengtzboe |
Political offices
| Preceded by Max Elger | Minister for Financial Markets; 2022–present | Incumbent |
