= Cecilia Engström =

Swedish politician (born 1972)

Member of the Riksdag
- Incumbent
- Assumed office 2022
- Constituency: Skåne County South
- In office 14 January 2020 – 30 August 2020
- Constituency: Skåne County West

Personal details
- Born: 1972 (age 53–54) Kristianstad County, Sweden
- Party: Christian Democrats

Anna-Karin Cecilia Engström (born 1972) is a Swedish politician from the Christian Democrats. She has been a member of the Riksdag since 2022.

== Political career ==
Engström ran in the 2018 Swedish general election and became a substitute. She was the acting substitute in the Riksdag for Michael Anefur during the period 14 January to 30 August 2020. In the Riksdag, she has been, among other things, a deputy in the Culture Committee and an additional deputy in the Committee on Health and Welfare.

== See also ==
- List of members of the Riksdag, 2018–2022
- List of members of the Riksdag, 2022–2026
