= Benjamin Dousa =

Swedish politician and government minister

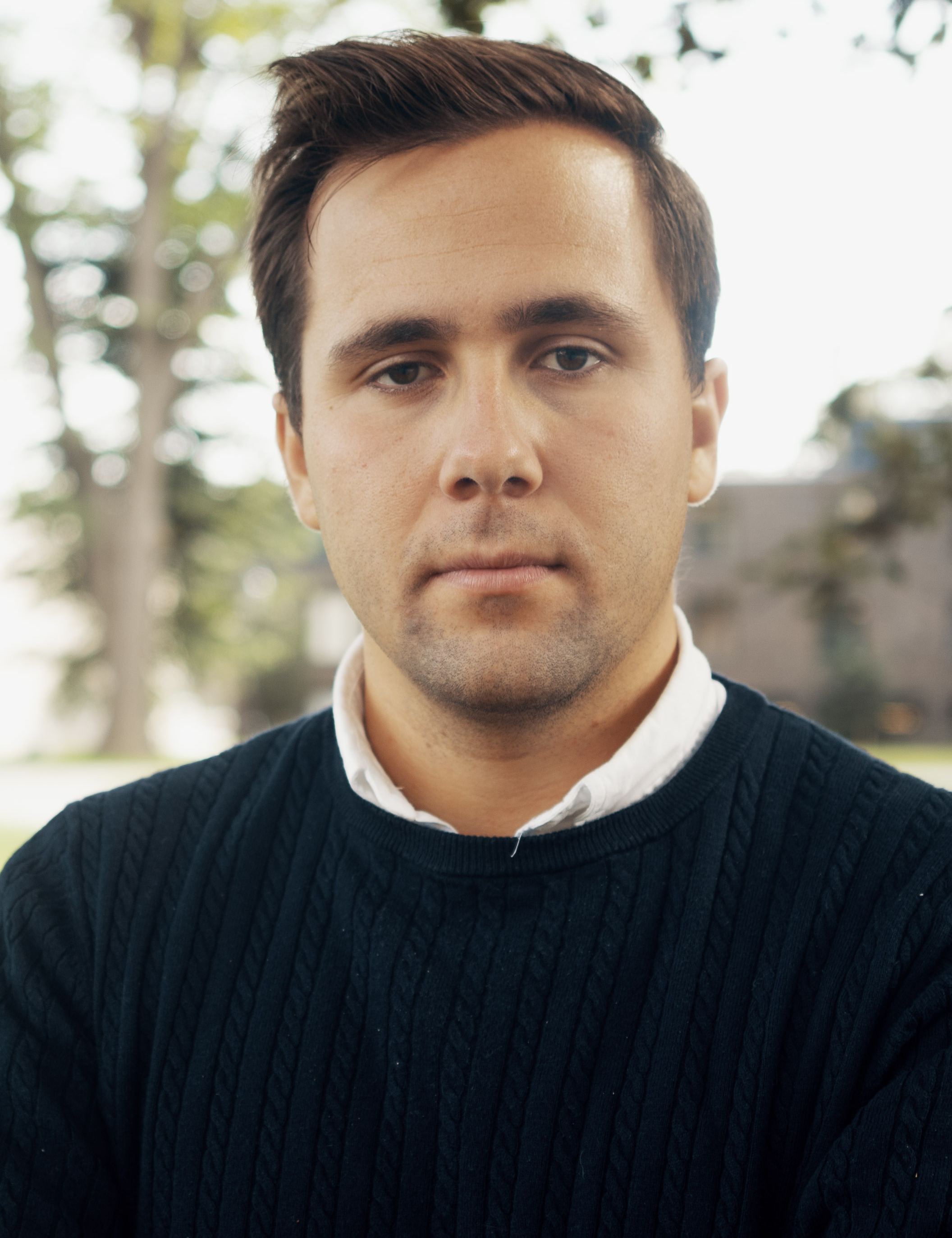

Minister for International Development Cooperation and Foreign Trade
- Incumbent
- Assumed office 10 September 2024
- Monarch: Carl XVI Gustaf
- Prime Minister: Ulf Kristersson
- Preceded by: Johan Forssell

Chairman of the Moderate Youth League
- In office 29 October 2016 – 14 November 2020
- Preceded by: Rasmus Törnblom
- Succeeded by: Matilda Ekeblad

Personal details
- Born: Benjamin Arif Dousa; 5 December 1992 (age 33) Stockholm, Sweden
- Party: Moderate Party
- Spouse: Helena Walentowicz (m. 2026)
- Children: 2
- Education: Stockholm School of Economics; London School of Economics
- Cabinet: Kristersson

Benjamin Arif Dousa (born 5 December 1992) is a Swedish politician of the Moderate Party. He has been Minister for International Development Cooperation and Foreign Trade in the government of Ulf Kristersson since September 2024.

Dousa was chairman of the Moderate Youth League from 2016 to 2020. After leaving party politics, he was chief executive officer of the free-market think tank Timbro from 2020 to 2023 and of Företagarna, the Swedish Federation of Business Owners, from 2023 until his appointment to the government in 2024.

== Early life and education ==
Dousa was born in Stockholm and grew up in Husby, in the Rinkeby-Kista district of northern Stockholm. He was raised by his mother, Sonja Dousa.

He attended Viktor Rydberg Gymnasium Odenplan from 2008 to 2011. He subsequently studied at the Stockholm School of Economics, graduating with a bachelor's degree in business and economics in 2015.

From 2023 to 2024, Dousa pursued master's-level studies in public administration at the London School of Economics. The studies were interrupted when he was appointed to the Swedish government in September 2024.

== Political career ==
=== Early political activities ===
Dousa joined the Moderate Youth League at a young age and became active in the party's student organisations. He was national chairman of the Moderate School Youth from 2012 to 2013 and as chairman of Moderate Students from 2014 to 2016.

He worked as a junior economist at SEB between 2015 and 2016.

Dousa was also active in local and regional politics. He was a member of the Stockholm regional council from 2014 to 2020. He was deputy chairman of the Rinkeby-Kista district council from 2014 to 2018 and chairman from 2018 to 2020.

=== Chairman of the Moderate Youth League ===
At the Moderate Youth League congress on 29 October 2016, Dousa challenged the incumbent chairman, Rasmus Törnblom. Dousa won the leadership vote by 66 votes to 33.

He was unanimously re-elected at the organisation's congress in November 2018.

During his chairmanship, the Moderate Youth League advocated lower taxes, tougher criminal policy and reforms intended to reduce social exclusion. Dousa frequently drew on his upbringing in Husby when discussing integration, employment and crime.

On 11 May 2020, Dousa announced that he intended to leave both the chairmanship and active party politics, saying that he wanted to pursue a career outside politics. He formally stepped down at the league's congress on 14 November 2020 and was succeeded by Matilda Ekeblad.

== Career outside party politics ==
=== Timbro ===
Dousa became chief executive officer of the free-market think tank Timbro in 2020.

As chief executive, he worked on issues concerning economic growth, labour-market policy, integration, entrepreneurship and the role of the welfare state. He remained at Timbro until 2023.

Dousa was also a member of the board of the Stockholm School of Economics from 2019 to 2023.

=== Företagarna ===
In July 2023, Dousa was appointed chief executive officer of Företagarna, an organisation representing Swedish small and medium-sized business owners. He took up the position later that year.

At Företagarna, Dousa focused on economic growth, regulation, taxation and conditions for small businesses. He left the organisation in September 2024 after accepting a position in the government.

== Minister for International Development Cooperation and Foreign Trade ==
On 10 September 2024, Prime Minister Ulf Kristersson appointed Dousa Minister for International Development Cooperation and Foreign Trade. He succeeded Johan Forssell, who was appointed Minister for Migration.

Dousa's ministerial portfolio includes international development cooperation, humanitarian assistance, foreign trade, export and investment promotion and matters concerning Sweden's participation in international trade policy.

=== Development assistance policy ===
Shortly after Dousa took office, the government announced that Sweden's annual development-assistance framework would be reduced from SEK 56 billion to SEK 53 billion for the period 2026–2028. The government argued that the multi-year framework would continue to make Sweden one of the world's largest aid donors while creating greater predictability in the state budget.

As minister, Dousa continued the implementation of the government's development-assistance reform agenda, Development Assistance for a New Era – Freedom, Empowerment and Sustainable Growth. The agenda places greater emphasis on poverty reduction through economic growth, trade, private-sector development, education, migration cooperation, women's and girls' rights and support for democracy and human rights.

In November 2024, the government announced that Sweden's bilateral development cooperation with Yemen would be phased out by June 2025. Humanitarian assistance to the country was to continue. The decision was presented as part of a concentration of Swedish bilateral aid on fewer countries and thematic priorities.

In June 2025, the government adopted a new humanitarian-assistance strategy for the period 2025–2029. The strategy, implemented by the Swedish International Development Cooperation Agency, prioritised life-saving assistance, protection for crisis-affected populations, cost-effectiveness, innovation and stronger cooperation with local humanitarian organisations.

In July 2025, the government introduced a financing instrument allowing development-assistance funding to be combined with export credits and export-credit guarantees. The instrument was intended to enable socially beneficial infrastructure and development projects in low- and lower-middle-income countries that would not otherwise be commercially viable.

In April 2026, the government announced humanitarian allocations of more than SEK 2.7 billion to international humanitarian organisations. The funding was directed towards people affected by armed conflicts, displacement, hunger and other humanitarian emergencies, including crises in Sudan, the Middle East and Ukraine.

The same month, the government proposed returning SEK 1.668 billion to the development-assistance budget after Sweden's asylum-related costs for 2025 proved lower than had been forecast. The government stated that the funds would be used to continue implementing its development-assistance reform agenda.

In 2026, Dousa was also involved in several government initiatives concerning global health. In April, the government announced a SEK 72 million package including support for vaccine development and international health cooperation. In July, it announced a further SEK 250 million package for vaccines, maternal and newborn health and sexual and reproductive health and rights.

=== Support for Ukraine ===
Support for Ukraine became a central part of Dousa's ministerial responsibilities. In February 2025, the government expanded Sweden's special export-credit guarantees for trade with Ukraine. The changes permitted longer guarantee periods, higher levels of coverage and guarantees for exports of services, with the stated aim of enabling more Swedish companies to participate in Ukraine's reconstruction.

In March 2025, the government announced an additional SEK 100 million contribution to the World Bank's Ukraine Relief, Recovery, Reconstruction and Reform Trust Fund. The support was intended for the restoration of essential infrastructure, public services, macroeconomic stability and reforms associated with Ukraine's application for membership of the European Union.

During a visit to Ukraine in April 2025, Dousa signed a memorandum of understanding concerning Swedish support for residents of Gammalsvenskby, a village founded by Swedish-speaking settlers in the eighteenth century and heavily affected by Russia's invasion.

In December 2025, the government announced SEK 2 billion in additional budget support for Ukraine in 2026 through the EU's Ukraine Facility. According to the government, the support was intended to help finance essential public services, including energy, health care, schools and pension payments.

In March 2026, Dousa and the government presented a report to the Riksdag on the results of Sweden's civilian and humanitarian support to Ukraine and neighbouring countries between 2022 and 2025. The report was intended to improve transparency and assess the effects of Swedish assistance on humanitarian relief, reconstruction, public institutions and Ukraine's resilience.

=== Foreign trade and investment promotion ===
In the foreign-trade part of his portfolio, Dousa has promoted free trade, new EU trade agreements, Swedish exports and foreign investment in Sweden. He has argued that trade policy should be used to strengthen Swedish competitiveness and reduce dependence on a limited number of trading partners.

Dousa participated in the government's work to promote Sweden as a destination for international investment through the Join Sweden initiative. At the Join Sweden Summit in February 2025, he highlighted foreign investment by companies including AstraZeneca and Microsoft and emphasised access to energy, skilled labour and predictable regulation as important factors in Sweden's international competitiveness.

In August 2025, he held consultations with Swedish companies and trade organisations regarding the EU–United States framework for trade relations and its possible consequences for Swedish exports.

In December 2025, the government launched the Made with Sweden initiative, intended to promote Swedish exports, attract foreign investment and strengthen international economic cooperation during a period of increasing protectionism.

Dousa has also advocated the conclusion and implementation of new European Union free-trade agreements, including agreements with Mercosur and India. During visits to Swedish export-oriented municipalities in 2026, he argued that wider access to international markets would increase exports and employment in Swedish industrial regions.

As part of his export-promotion responsibilities, Dousa has presented the Government's Music Export Prize and the Government's Cultural and Creative Industries Export Prize. In 2026, the latter was awarded to the Swedish video-game company Hazelight Studios.

== Personal life ==
Dousa married Helena Walentowicz in June 2026. They have two children.

Party political offices
Preceded by Rasmus Törnblom	Chairman of the Moderate Youth League; 2016–2020	Succeeded by Matilda Ekeblad
Political offices
Preceded by Johan Forssell	Minister for Foreign Trade; 2024–present	Incumbent
Preceded by Johan Forssell	Minister for International Development Cooperation; 2024–present	Incumbent
