= Gustaf Sparre =

- Gustaf Adolf Vive Sparre, Swedish politician, Prime Minister for Justice 1848–56
- Gustaf Sparre (speaker), Swedish politician, Speaker of Första kammaren 1896–1908
