= Magnus Persson (politician) =

Swedish politician (born 1970)

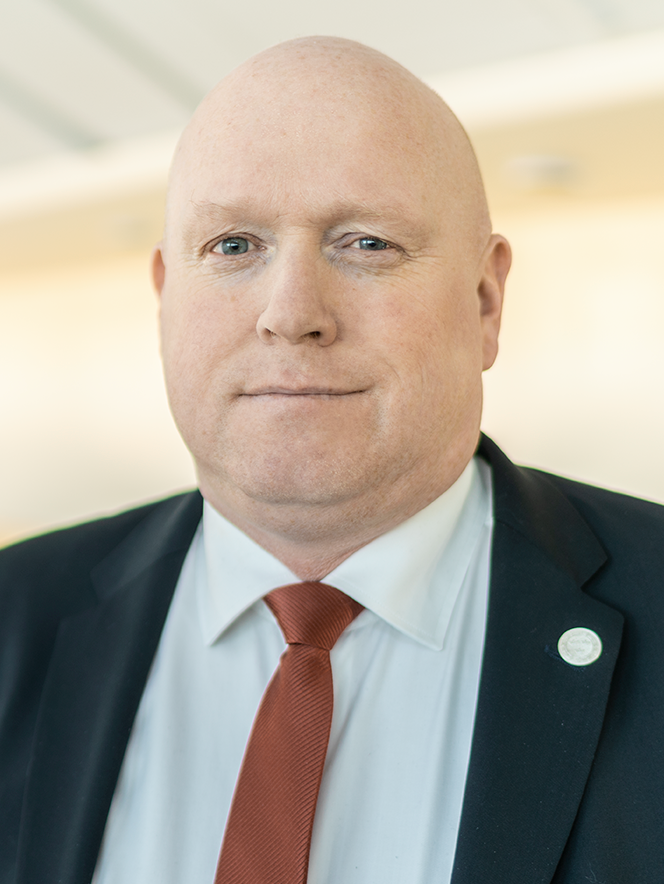

Member of the Riksdag
- Incumbent
- Assumed office 2014
- Constituency: Dalarna County

Personal details
- Born: 19 December 1970 (age 55) Ivetofta
- Party: Sweden Democrats

Lars Ola Magnus Persson (born 19 December 1970) is a Swedish politician who has been a member of the Riksdag for the Sweden Democrats party since 2014. He represents the Dalarna County constituency.

Persson was born in 1970 and grew up in Ivetofta. He is a construction worker and was a member of the municipal council in Bromölla municipality for the SD from 2018 to 2020. He was elected to parliament during the 2014 Swedish general election. Following the 2022 Swedish general election, he was appointed to head the Committee on the Labour Market in the Riksdag, taking over the role from Anna Johansson and becoming one of four Sweden Democrat politicians to chair a Riksdag committee.
