= Lars Hjälmered =

Swedish politician

Lars Hjälmered M
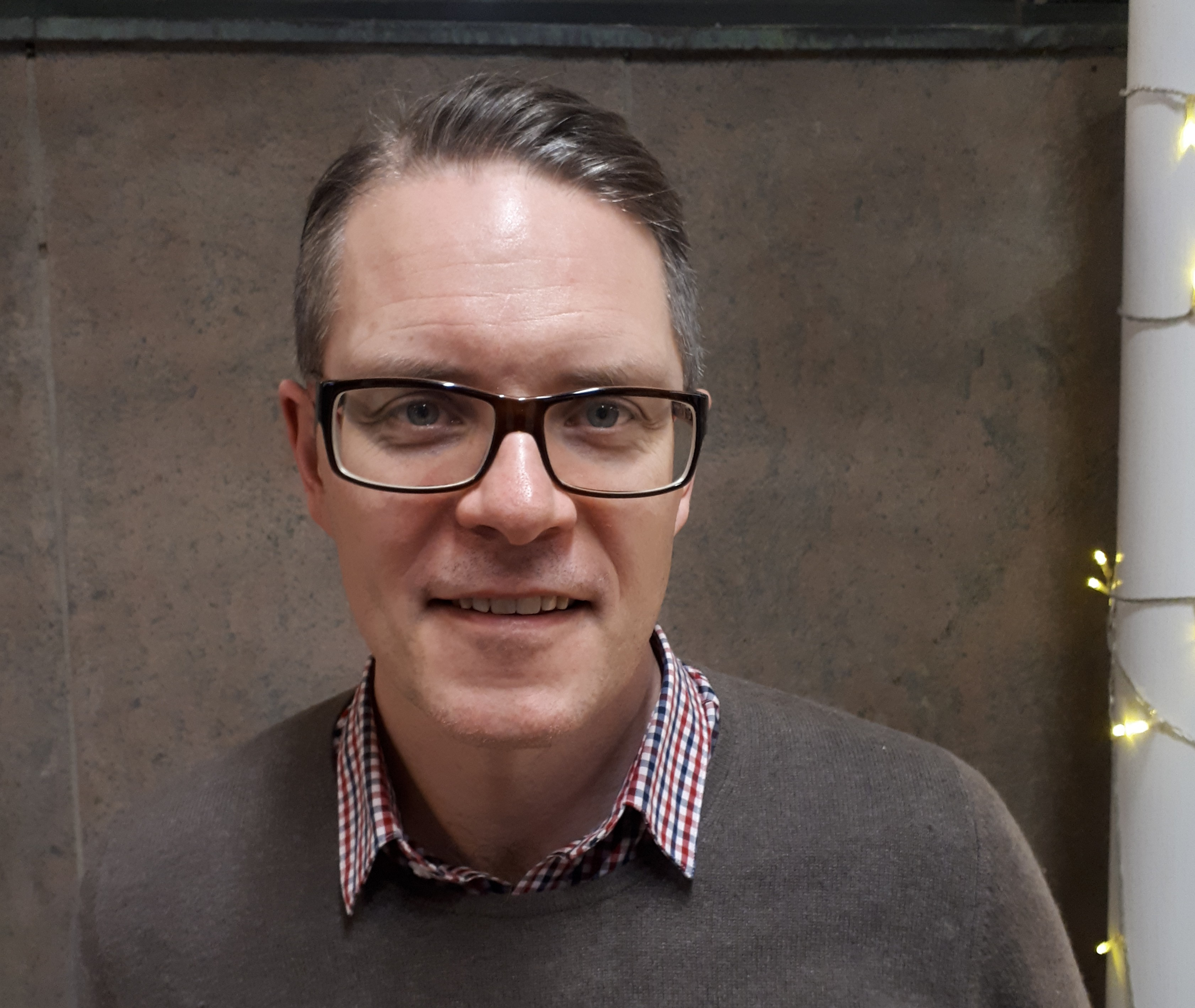

Member of the Swedish Parliament for Gothenburg Municipality
- In office 2 October 2006 – 26 September 2022

Personal details
- Born: 22 February 1977 (age 49)
- Party: Moderate Party
- Education: University of Gothenburg; Chalmers University of Technology (Master of science in Mechanical Engineering)
- Profession: Civil engineer
- Website: Lars Hjälmered's blog

Lars Olof Hjälmered (born 22 February 1977) is a Swedish politician for the Moderate Party. He was member of the Riksdag from 2006 to 2022, representing Gothenburg Municipality. Since October 2022, Hjälmered is state secretary with responsibility for state owned companies at the Ministry of Finance under Minister for Finance Elisabeth Svantesson.

Hjälmered is a trained civil engineer in mechanical engineering, he studied at Chalmers University of Technology in Gothenburg. He has worked at Volvo Aero in Trollhättan before he was elected to the Riksdag. He has also been a member of Gothenburg's municipal council.

== Duties in the Riksdag ==
Hjälmered is a member of the Riksdag's Committee for Industry and Trade since September 2013. He is the group leader for the Moderate Party in the committee. He first became Speaker in October 2018 and later left the role as Speaker in February 2019. He later rebecame Speaker in May 2019.

After the 2006 general election was Hjälmered elected as a member of the Riksdag as a member for the constituency of Gothenburg Municipality. He was appointed as an alternate for the Transport and Communications Committee and the Education Committee. In November 2006 he became a member of the Educational Committee, a position he held until October 2009 when he became an alternate again. After he became a member of the Education Committee he stepped down as an alternate for the Transport and Communications Committee.

In October 2009 he became a member of the Environment and Agriculture Committee, a position which he held up until September 2013. In October 2010 he stepped down as an alternate of the Education Committee. In October 2014 he became the vice-Speaker for the Transport and Communications Committee, he was vice-Speaker until December 2014. He has also been a member of the European Union Affairs Committee from October 2010 until September 2013. Since October 2018 Hjälmered has been a member of the War Delegation.

== Other duties and Awards ==
In March 2014, Hjälmered was appointed the Moderates' energy policy spokesperson. Lars Olof Hjälmered was the first name for the Moderate Party in Gothenburg Municipality during the 2014 general election. In October 2008 was Hjälmered an alternate for the board for the Bank of Sweden Tercentenary Foundation.

In 2014, Lars Hjälmered and Jennie Nilsson were named by Entrepreneurs as "Entrepreneur-friendly Member of Parliament of the Year".

== Controversies ==
In the middle of March 2010, a parliamentary inquiry was launched against Hjälmered and two other MPs for suspicions of bribery. The Chief Prosecutor, Björn Ericson in Malmö, had received information that the three members of the Riksdag had been invited to a trip to France paid for by the company Shell. As it was not clear whether it was improper or not, the chief prosecutor chose to initiate a preliminary investigation. None of the suspects were notified of any suspicion and at the end of March the investigation was laid down, and it was ruled that it had appeared that no crimes had been committed.
