= Rasmus Törnblom =

Swedish politician

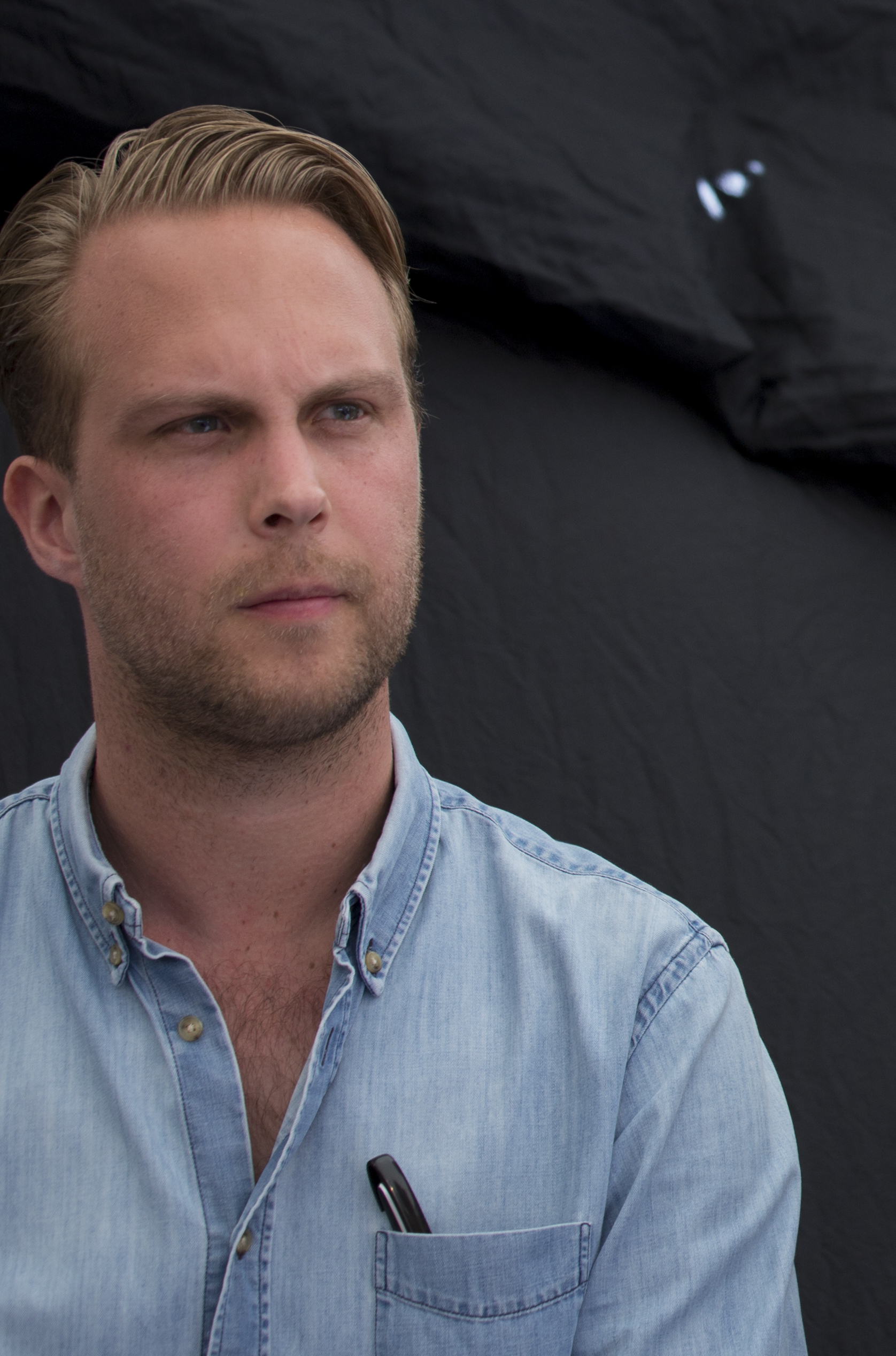

Chairman of the Moderate Youth League
- In office 22 November 2014 – 29 October 2016
- Preceded by: Erik Bengtzboe
- Succeeded by: Benjamin Dousa

Personal details
- Born: January 22, 1990 (age 36)

Rasmus Törnblom (born January 22, 1990) is a Swedish Moderate Party politician who was chairman of the Moderate Youth League from 2014 to 2016.

He previously served as chairman of the Moderate School Youth and association board member of the Moderate Youth League.

Since November 2022, Törnblom has served as Deputy Mayor and municipal commissioner in Lund Municipality.

Political offices
Preceded by Erik Bengtzboe	Chairman of the Moderate Youth League; 2014–2016	Succeeded by Benjamin Dousa
