= Erik Bengtzboe =

Swedish Moderate Party politician

Member of the Riksdag
- In office 1 January 2015 – 26 April 2019
- Succeeded by: Jari Puustinen
- Constituency: Södermanland County

Chairman of the Moderate Youth League
- In office 27 November 2010 – 22 November 2014
- Preceded by: Niklas Wykman
- Succeeded by: Rasmus Törnblom

Personal details
- Born: February 9, 1987 (age 39) Nyköping, Södermanland, Sweden
- Education: KTH Royal Institute of Technology

Erik Bengtzboe (born February 9, 1987, in Nyköping, Södermanland) is a Swedish Moderate Party politician who was a Member of the Riksdag from January 2015 to April 2019. Bengtzboe served as chairman of the Moderate Youth League from 2010 to 2014.

He was also a member of parliament from 2010 to 2011 as he was chosen to fill the spot from his Moderate Party colleague and the former Speaker of the Riksdag Per Westerberg. He resigned on 26 April 2019 following Aftonbladet's report series "The Politician's Receipts". The newspaper's articles showed that Bengtzboe received SEK 158,000 in allowances and compensation for an overnight apartment in Stockholm, since he was recorded with his mother in Nyköping, while his wife and children were recorded in the apartment.

Previously, he served as chairman of the Moderate School Youth and association board member of the Moderate Youth League.

Besides politics, he studies Industrial Engineering and Management at KTH Royal Institute of Technology in Stockholm. However, he has taken a study break for his political commitments. From October 2010 until January 2011 he served as a replacement Speaker of the Riksdag. When he became a replacement member of the Riksdag in September 2014, he officially became a member of the Riksdag in December 2014. In January 2015 he joined the Committee on Education, he stayed in the committee until February 2019 when he joined and later became the second vice-Speaker of the Committee on the Labour Market in March 2019. He left all his positions in the Riksdag on 26 April 2019.

Preceded by Niklas Wykman	Chairman of the Moderate Youth League; 2010–-2014	Succeeded by Rasmus Törnblom
