= Committee on Industry and Trade (Sweden) =

Parliamentary committee in the Swedish Riksdag

The (Parliamentary) Committee on Industry and Trade (Swedish: Näringsutskottet, NU) is a parliamentary committee in the Swedish Riksdag. The committee's areas of responsibility concern Business policies and related research on those terms, along with trade, energy policies, regional development policy, state-owned enterprises and price, and competition conditions.

The committee's Speaker is Tobias Andersson from the Sweden Democrats and the vice-Speaker of the committee is Elisabeth Thand Rinqvist from the Centre Party.

== List of speakers for the committee ==
Name	Period	Political party
Ingvar Svanberg	1971-1982	Social Democratic Party
Nils Erik Wååg	1982–1988	Social Democratic Party
Lennart Pettersson	1988–1991	Social Democratic Party
Rolf Dahlberg	1991–1994	Moderate Party
Birgitta Johansson	1994–1998	Social Democratic Party
Per Westerberg	1998–2002	Moderate Party
Marie Granlund	2002–2006	Social Democratic Party
Karin Pilsäter	2006–2010	People's Party
Carl B. Hamilton	2010	People's Party
Mats Odell	2010–2012	Christian Democrats
Jessica Polfjärd	2012–2013	Moderate Party
Mats Odell	2013–2014	Christian Democrats
Jennie Nilsson	2014–2018	Social Democratic Party
Lars Hjälmered	2018–2019	Moderate Party
Carl-Oskar Bohlin	2019	Moderate Party
Lars Hjälmered	2019–2022	Moderate Party
Carl-Oskar Bohlin	2022	Moderate Party
Tobias Andersson	2022–	Sweden Democrats

== List of vice-speakers for the committee ==
Name	Period	Political party
Christer Eirefelt	1985–1988	People's Party
Hadar Cars	1988–1991	People's Party
Anita Gradin	1991–1992	Social Democratic Party
Birgitta Johansson	1992–1994	Social Democratic Party
Hadar Cars	1994–1995	Liberal People's Party
Christer Eirefelt	1995–1998	Liberal People's Party
Barbro Andersson Öhrn	1998–2002	Social Democratic Party
Mikael Odenberg	2002–2003	Moderate Party
Per Bill	2003–2006	Moderate Party
Thomas Östros	2006–2008	Social Democratic Party
Tomas Eneroth	2008-2010	Social Democratic Party
Maria Wetterstrand	2010–2011	Green Party
Jonas Eriksson	2011-2014	Green Party
Catharina Elmsäter-Svärd	2014	Moderate Party
Lars Hjälmered	2014–2018	Moderate Party
Jennie Nilsson	2018–2019	Social Democratic Party
Helene Hellmark Knutsson	2019–2020	Social Democratic Party
Anna-Caren Sätherberg	2020–2021	Social Democratic Party
Jennie Nilsson	2021–2022	Social Democratic Party
Elisabeth Thand Ringqvist	2022–	Centre Party
