= Elsa Johansson =

Swedish politician (1888–1981)

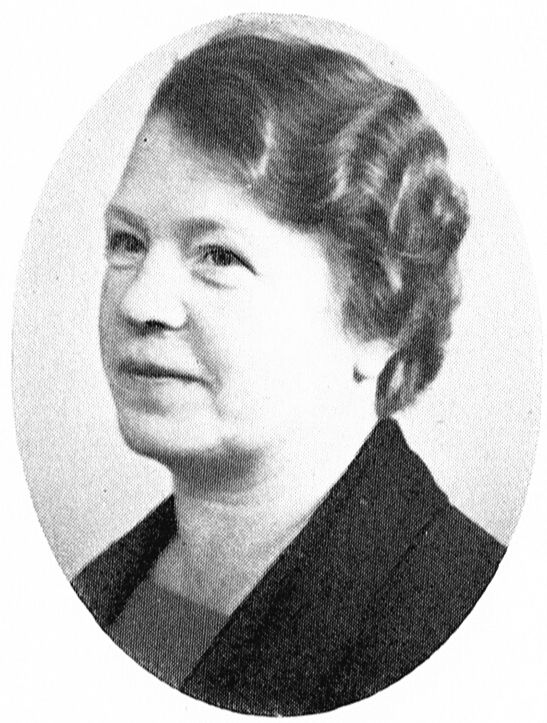
Elsa Johansson

Elsa Johansson (1888–1981) was a Swedish politician (Social Democratic Party of Sweden).

Johansson was a weaver in the textile industry in Norrköping. She engaged in the worker's union and then in the Social Democratic Party. She was the president of the local women's group of the party in 1934–1936.

Johansson was MP of the Second Chamber of the Parliament of Sweden in 1936–1956.

During almost her entire tenure, she was a member of the Second Law Committee. She eventually became the president of the Second Law Committee in 1956–1957 and as such the first woman in this office.
