= Liberala kvinnor =

Liberal Women in Sweden
- Liberala kvinnor
- Formation: 1936
- Type: Women's wing
- Headquarters: Stockholm, Sweden
- Official language: Swedish
- Chair: Amie Kronblad
- Affiliations: Liberals (Sweden)
- Website: https://liberalakvinnor.se/

The Liberal Women in Sweden (Swedish: Liberala kvinnor), is the women's wing of the Liberals (Sweden).

== History ==
A predecessor was the Frisinnade kvinnors riksförbund ("Free-minded Women's League") later known as the Svenska Kvinnors Vänsterförbund ("The Leftist League of Swedish Women"), founded in 1914 and connected to the Free-minded National Association.

In 1924, the Women's group of the Frisinnade folkpartiet was founded under Vira Eklund. The Frisinnade folkpartiet was one of the two liberal parties which united in 1934 to form the Liberals. When the Frisinnade folkpartiet and the Liberal Party of Sweden united to form the Liberals (Sweden) in 1934, there was a need for a women's wing for the new liberal party.

After the unification of the two liberal parties and the foundation of the Liberals, a women's wing was founded for the new party by the women's wing of one of the former parties. It was established informally in 1935 and formally in June 1936 under the leadership of Vira Eklund.

== Chairpersons ==
- Vira Eklund 1935–1938
- Ellen Hagen 1938–1946
- Ruth Hamrin-Thorell 1946–1950
- Eva Wennerström-Hartmann 1950–1956
- Ingrid Andrén 1956–1962
- Jessie Ståhl 1962–1964
- Margareta Nordström 1964–1967
- Ingegärd Frænkel 1967–1977
- Charlotte Branting 1977–1988
- Barbro Westerholm 1988–1997
- Helena Bargholtz 1997–2006
- Solveig Hellquist 2006–2007
- Birgitta Ohlsson 2007–2010
- Bonnie Bernström 2010–2012
- Anna Steele 2012–2014
- Gulan Avci 2014–2019
- Cecilia Elving 2019–?
- Amie Kronblad 2026–
