= Vira Eklund =

Swedish politician (1880–1967)

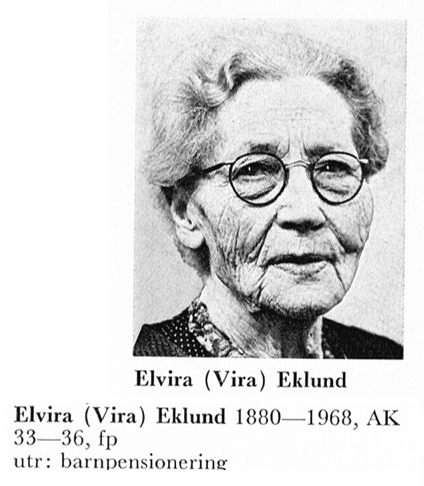
Elvira Eklund SPA

Maria Elvira "Vira" Eklund (née Gustafsson; 13 February 1880 – 9 December 1967) was a Swedish politician (Liberals), educator and author.

== Life ==
Eklund was born in Rytterne to the farmer Gustaf Johansson and Maria Andersson. She worked as a schoolteacher in 1898–1940.

She was a board member in the Association of School Teachers of Sweden in 1927–1940. She was a member of the Woman's Christian Temperance Union, where she was a board member in 1920–1939.

=== Liberal party politician ===
Vira Eklund was a member of the liberal party Frisinnade folkpartiet/Free-minded National Association. She was a deputy president of the Free-minded National Association in 1928–1934. After the party unification in 1934 she became deputy president of the Liberal Party in 1934. Eklund was an MP of the Second Chamber of the Parliament of Sweden for Stockholm in 1934–1936; first for the Free-minded National Association and from 1935 for the Liberals. During her tenure as MP, she focused on educational issues.

=== Organizer of liberal women ===
In 1924, she was a co-founder and chair of Kvinnogruppen inom Frisinnade Folkpartiet, the women's wing of the Frisinnade folkpartiet, in 1924–1934. The Frisinnade folkpartiet was one of the two liberal parties which united in 1934 to form the Liberals. When the Frisinnade folkpartiet and the Liberal Party of Sweden united to form the Liberals (Sweden) in 1934, there was a need for a women's wing for the new liberal party. After the unification of the two liberal parties and the foundation of the Liberals, a women's wing was founded for the new party by the women's wing of one of the former parties. The Liberala kvinnor was established informally in 1935 and formally in June 1936 under the leadership of Vira Eklund. She was the co-founder and the first president of the women's wing of the Liberal party in 1935–1938. She died in Bromma in Stockholm.

=== Writer ===
Eklund contributed novels for the press, and debuted with her first published novel in book form in 1905.
