= Committee on Health and Welfare =

Swedish parliamentary committee

The (Parliamentary) Committee on Health and Welfare (Swedish: Socialutskottet, SoU) is a parliamentary committee in the Swedish Riksdag. The committee's main areas of responsibility concern the wellbeing of children and teenagers, care for the elderly and disabled, measures against addiction, and other social services issues. It also debates on policies regarding alcohol, and health care along with social matters in general.

The committee's Speaker is Christian Carlsson from the Christian Democratic Party, and the vice-Speaker is Fredrik Lundh Sammeli from the Social Democratic Party.

== List of speakers for the committee ==
Name	Period	Political party
Göran Karlsson	-	Social Democratic Party
Ingemar Eliasson	1982–1985	People's Party
Daniel Tarschys	1985–1991	People's Party
Bo Holmberg	1991–1994	Social Democratic Party
Sten Svensson	1994–1998	Moderate Party
Ingrid Burman	1998–2006	Left Party
Kenneth Johansson	2006–2012	Centre Party
Anders W. Jonsson	2012–2014	Centre Party
Emma Henriksson	2014–2018	Christian Democrats
Acko Ankarberg Johansson	2018–2022	Christian Democrats
Christian Carlsson	2022–	Christian Democrats

== List of vice-speakers for the committee ==
Name	Period	Political party
Sten Svensson	1991-1994	Moderate Party
Bo Holmberg	1994–1996	Social Democratic Party
Ingrid Andersson	1996–1998	Social Democratic Party
Chris Heister	1998–2002	Moderate Party
Chatrine Pålsson Ahlgren	2002–2006	Christian Democrats
Mona Sahlin	2006–2007	Social Democratic Party
Ylva Johansson	2007–2010	Social Democratic Party
Lena Hallengren	2010–2014	Social Democratic Party
Veronica Palm	2014–2015	Social Democratic Party
Anna-Lena Sörenson	2015–2018	Social Democratic Party
Kristina Nilsson	2018–2022	Social Democratic Party
Fredrik Lundh Sammeli	2022–	Social Democratic Party
