= Johan Forssell =

Johan Forssell may refer to:

- Johan Forssell (politician, born 1855) (1855–1914), Swedish politician
- Johan Forssell (politician, born 1979), Swedish politician
