= Committee on Taxation =

Swedish Parliamentary committee

The [Parliamentary] Committee on Taxation (Swedish: Skatteutskottet, SkU) is a parliamentary committee in the Swedish Riksdag. The committee manages and debates matters concerning state and municipal taxes and matters concerning taxation, tax payment, and, population registration, as well as matters concerning the enforcement system. Taxes also include customs duties and taxes comparable to taxes.

The committee's Speaker is Niklas Karlsson from the Social Democratic Party and the committee's vice-Speaker is Per Söderlund from the Sweden Democrats.

== List of speakers for the committee ==
| Namn | Period | Political party |
|---|---|---|
| Erik Wärnberg | 1974-1983 | Social Democratic Party |
| Rune Carlstein | 1983–1985 | Social Democratic Party |
| Jan Bergqvist | 1985–1988 | Social Democratic Party |
| Lars Hedfors | 1988–1991 | Social Democratic Party |
| Knut Wachtmeister | 1991–1994 | Moderate Party |
| Lars Hedfors | 1994–1998 | Social Democratic Party |
| Arne Kjörnsberg | 1998–2004 | Social Democratic Party |
| Susanne Eberstein | 2004–2006 | Social Democratic Party |
| Lennart Hedquist | 2006–2010 | Moderate Party |
| Henrik von Sydow | 2010–2014 | Moderate Party |
| Per Åsling | 2014–2018 | Centre Party |
| Jörgen Hellman | 2018–2022 | Social Democratic Party |
| Erik Ezelius | 2022 | Social Democratic Party |
| Niklas Karlsson | 2022– | Social Democratic Party |

== List of vice-speakers for the committee ==
| Name | Period | Political party | Notes |
|---|---|---|---|
| Bo Lundgren | 1988–1991 | Moderate Party | |
| Lars Hedfors | 1991-1994 | Social Democratic Party | |
| Bo Lundgren | 1994–1999 | Moderate Party | |
| Carl Fredrik Graf | 1999–2002 | Moderate Party | |
| Anna Grönlund Krantz | 2002–2006 | Liberal People's Party | |
| Lars Johansson | 2006–2010 | Social Democratic Party | |
| Veronica Palm | 2010–2011 | Social Democratic Party | |
| Jennie Nilsson | 2011–2012 | Social Democratic Party | |
| Leif Jakobsson | 2012–2016 | Social Democratic Party | |
| Jörgen Hellman | 2016–2018 | Social Democratic Party | |
| Per Åsling | 2018–2022 | Centre Party | |
| Niklas Wykman | 2019–2022 | Moderate Party | Second vice-Speaker |
| Per Söderlund | 2022– | Sweden Democrats | |
