= Second Law Committee =

The Second Law Committee (Swedish: Andra lagutskottet, 2 LU), was a committee in the Swedish Riksdag during the bicameral period of Sweden. The committee's areas of responsibility of the Second Law Committee concern, policies, and questions on legislation on social issues.

The committee was defunct at the abolition of the bicameral Riksdag in 1971 along with the First Law Committee, and the Third Law Committee.

== Presidents ==
- Axel von Sneidern (1920–1921)
- Bror Petrén (1922–1925)
- Karl Gustaf Westman (1926–1936)
- Sigfrid Hansson (1937–1938)
- David Norman (1938–1955)
- Elsa Johansson (1955–1957)
- Axel Strand (1957–1970)

== Vice Presidents ==
- Ivar Österström (1925–1932)
- Karl Magnusson i Skövde (1932–1934)
- Kerstin Hesselgren (1939–1944)
- Åke Holmbäck (1945–1949)
- Edvin Jacobsson (1950–1960)
- John Anderson i Sundsvall (1961–1968)
- Ruth Hamrin-Thorell (1969–1970)
