= Ruth Hamrin-Thorell =

Swedish politician (1903–1991)

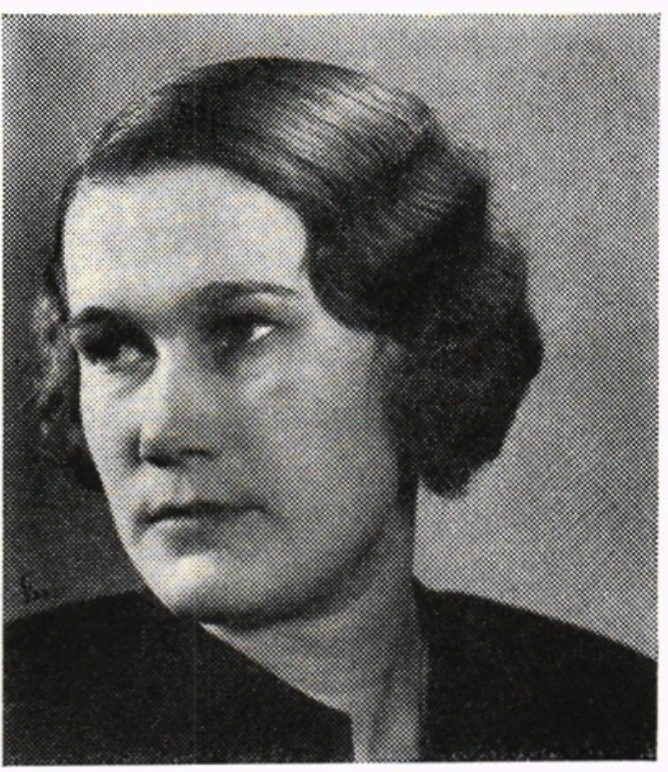
Ruth Hamrin-Thorell

Ruth Hamrin-Thorell (1903-1991) was a Swedish politician (Liberals (Sweden)).

She was the Chair of the Liberal women in 1946–1950.

Eklund was an MP of the First Chamber of the Parliament of Sweden in 1955–1970.

During her tenure as MP, she focused on social issues.
