= Tanja Linderborg =

Swedish member of parliament (1943–2023)

Member of the Riksdag
- In office 1994–2002
- Constituency: Västmanland County

Personal details
- Born: Tatjana Elisabet Linderborg; 24 April 1943; Västerås, Sweden
- Died: 19 January 2023 (aged 79); Västerås, Sweden
- Political party: Left Party

Tatjana Elisabet "Tanja" Linderborg (24 April 1943–19 January 2023) was a Swedish politician and member of the Riksdag for the Left Party from 1994 to 2002. She chaired the Committee on Civil-Law Legislation from 1998 to 2002.

== Early life ==
Linderborg was born on 24 April 1943 in Västerås, Sweden.

== Career ==
Linderborg joined the Left Party in her early teens. She was a member of the municipal assembly of Västerås Municipality for ten years from 1978 to 1988.

In 1994 she was elected to the Riksdag, remaining as a member for two terms until 2002. During her time in the Riksdag she served as a member and later chair of the Committee on Civil-Law Legislation. After leaving the Riksdag she continued as a regional politician as well as an enquirer for the government.

== Personal life and death ==
Linderborg is the mother of writer and columnist Åsa Linderborg.

Linderborg died on 19 January 2023.
