= Ragnwi Marcelind =

Swedish politician (1953–2021)

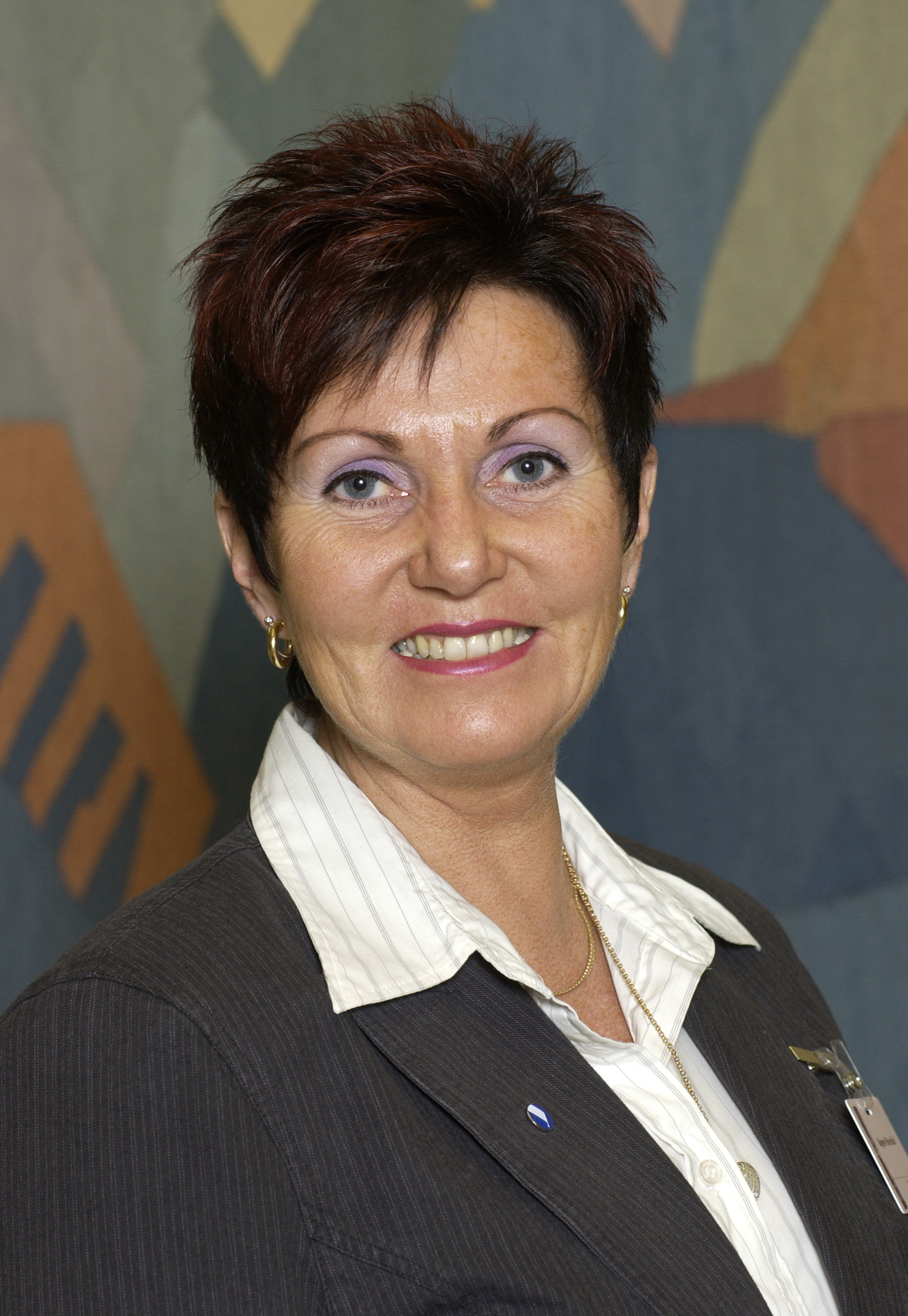

Ragnwi Marcelind (1953–2021) was a Swedish Christian Democratic politician. She was a member of the Riksdag from 1998 to 2006. From 2006 she was the State Secretary for Maria Larsson, the Minister of Elder Care and Public Health.
