= Committee on Banking (Sweden) =

The Standing Committee on Banking [and Currency] (Swedish: Bankoutskottet, BaU) was a Swedish parliamentary committee that operated from 1672 to 1970. Originally created to supervise the newly established Riksbank, it evolved into a permanent institution with constitutional status by 1809. Its early duties focused on reviewing the bank's condition and reporting to the estates, but over time it gained the authority to propose reforms and oversee wider financial matters.

During the 19th and 20th centuries, the committee became the Riksdag's main financial watchdog. It scrutinized the governance of the Riksbank and the National Debt Office, reviewed auditors’ reports, and proposed legislation on banking and currency. Its scope later expanded to include pension-related budget issues, loan funds, and even broader economic and industrial policy questions.

After nearly three centuries of influence, the committee was dissolved in 1970 when Sweden shifted to a single-chamber parliament with a new committee system.

== History ==
=== Early origins (1600s) ===
The committee traces its roots back to the Riksdag of 1672, when the estates created their first permanent joint body. Its task was to oversee the new bank founded in 1668, which operated under the estates’ direct guarantee and supervision. At the time, it was known as the bank deputation (bankodeputationen) or the bank deputies (bankodeputerade). Membership came from the nobility, clergy, and burghers, but the peasantry were excluded throughout the 1600s and 1700s, though occasionally invited to participate.

In its earliest years, the deputation had no formal rules. Its sole responsibility was to review the bank's condition and report back. By the end of the 1600s, however, it began to meet more frequently. During the reign of Charles XII, it was repeatedly called upon to help manage the kingdom's strained finances, sometimes remaining in operation for years at a stretch.

=== The Age of Liberty and 18th century reforms ===
In the Age of Liberty (1719–1772), the deputation was appointed by the Secret Committee (Sekreta utskottet) and reported directly to it. After the coup of 1772, the body—by then officially called the Committee on Banking (Bankoutskottet)—was elected by electors from the three higher estates. The peasantry gained representation only in 1800, and in 1809 the committee was given constitutional status under the new Instrument of Government. The Parliament Act of 1810 spelled out its duties and granted it the right to propose new measures on its own initiative, securing its place as a permanent institution.

=== Internal structure ===
By the 18th century, the committee had developed a more organized structure with separate divisions:

- The Finance Division oversaw the bank's funds, note issues, and daily operations.
- The Chancellery Division reviewed minutes of the bank's directors and drafted rules.
- The Accounting and Audit Division handled loans and financial reviews.

When needed, a coinage subcommittee was also created to handle currency matters.

=== The bicameral era ===
With the creation of the bicameral Riksdag in the 19th century, the Committee on Banking became one of its permanent fixtures. Under the Parliament Act of 1810, it consisted of 36 members, nine from each estate. Later, it was reduced to 16 members, evenly divided between the two chambers.

Its central role was to monitor the Riksbank, assess its condition, and propose reforms. Over time, it grew into a key financial watchdog, scrutinizing reports from auditors, investigating the governance of both the Riksbank and the National Debt Office, and recommending improvements.

=== Expansion in the 20th century ===
Originally focused solely on the Riksbank, the committee's responsibilities expanded in 1909. It was now tasked with overseeing the National Debt Office, handling banking and currency legislation, and managing certain pension-related budget issues.

Later changes broadened its reach even further. In 1933, it took over responsibility for loan funds managed by the National Debt Office. In 1949, it began examining broader economic questions, such as the organization of industries and sectors not assigned to other committees.

The committee even had its offices inside the Riksbank building, keeping it physically close to the institution it monitored.

=== Dissolution (1970) ===
The Committee on Banking remained an influential part of Sweden's parliamentary system until 1970, when the country shifted from a two-chamber legislature to a single-chamber Riksdag. The reform introduced a new committee structure, and after nearly three centuries of service, the Committee on Banking was formally dissolved.

== Tasks ==
The work of the Committee on Banking was broad and evolved significantly over time, but at its heart it always revolved around the supervision of Sweden's financial institutions and the safeguarding of the nation's economic stability.

In the early years, its duties were simple: it was expected to examine the state of the Riksbank, keep an eye on its finances, and report its findings to the estates. Over the 18th and 19th centuries, these responsibilities grew into a permanent mandate. The committee became the Riksdag's main channel for supervising the Riksbank, assessing its management, and recommending changes to its regulations and operations. It also monitored how the bank's profits were used, ensuring that the central bank served the wider needs of the state. Beyond the Riksbank, the committee acted as a kind of financial auditor for the parliament. It reviewed reports from the state auditors on both the Riksbank and the National Debt Office, investigated their governance, and suggested remedies where shortcomings were found. In some cases, it was even empowered to make binding decisions on behalf of the Riksdag—although the extent of these powers was always set at the beginning of each parliamentary term.

The scope of its work expanded further in the 20th century. With the reforms of 1909, the committee was tasked not only with supervising the National Debt Office but also with preparing and reviewing legislation on banking and currency. Pension-related budget issues were also added to its docket, giving it influence over matters that touched directly on social welfare and state finances. Later reforms made its responsibilities even wider. From 1933 onward, it handled questions about loan funds managed by the National Debt Office, and after 1949 it was also charged with investigating broader economic issues. These included the organization of specific industries and sectors, as well as questions of economic policy that did not clearly fall under the authority of any other committee.

In this way, the Committee on Banking developed into a central institution within the Riksdag, balancing its traditional role as a watchdog over the Riksbank with an increasingly active part in shaping Sweden's financial and economic policy.

== Chairmen ==
- 1856–1857: Arvid Posse
- 1867–1867: Carl Jöran Kock
- 1867–1868: Wilhelm Fredrik Tersmeden
- 1869–1875: Jules von Schwerin
- 1876–1882: Janne Ekman
- 1883–1889: Gustaf Åkerhielm
- 1890–1891: Per Samzelius
- 1892–1893: Gustaf Åkerhielm
- 1894–1896: Robert Themptander
- 1897–1898: Harald Spens
- 1899–1901: Filip Boström
- 1902–1902: Erik Gustaf Boström
- 1903–1905: Filip Boström
- 1905–1906: Elof Biesèrt
- 1906–1907: John Rettig
- 1908–1911: Werner von Schwerin
- 1912: Isidor von Stapelmohr
- 1913: ?
- 1914(A) – 1915: Isidor von Stapelmohr
- 1916–1919: Ernst Hedenstierna
- 1920–1922: Emil Kristensson
- 1923–1926: Bernhard Eriksson
- 1927–1932: Carl Svensson
- 1933–1939L: Harald Åkerberg
- 1939U: ?
- 1940L: Harald Åkerberg
- 1940U: ?
- 1941–1950: Harald Åkerberg
- 1951–1956: Frans Severin
- 1957–1961: Knut G. Ewerlöf
- 1962–1970: Carl Göran Regnéll

== Vice chairmen (1867–1970) ==
- 1870–1872: Jacob Georg Agardh
- 1873–1877: Arvid Gumælius
- 1878–1887B: Ivar Lyttkens
- 1888–1890: Per Olof Hörnfeldt
- 1891–1892L: Arvid Gumælius
- 1893–1893: Arvid Gumælius
- 1894–1896: Harald Spens
- 1897–1902: Johan Johansson i Noraskog
- 1903–1908: August Henricson
- 1912–1914B: Hjalmar Wijk
- 1915–1917: Theodor Adelswärd
- 1918–1919: Emil Kristensson
- 1929–1932: Nils Winkler
- 1933–1936: Edvin Leffler
- 1937–1939L: Björn Frithiofsson Holmgren
- 1940L: Björn Frithiofsson Holmgren
- 1941–1942: Björn Frithiofsson Holmgren
- 1943–1947: Gustaf Svedman
- 1948–1949: Åke Wiberg
- 1950–1956: Knut Ewerlöf
- 1957–1959: Fritiof Boo
- 1962–?: Nils Albert Ståhle
