= Åsa Linderborg =

Swedish writer, columnist and historian (born 1968)

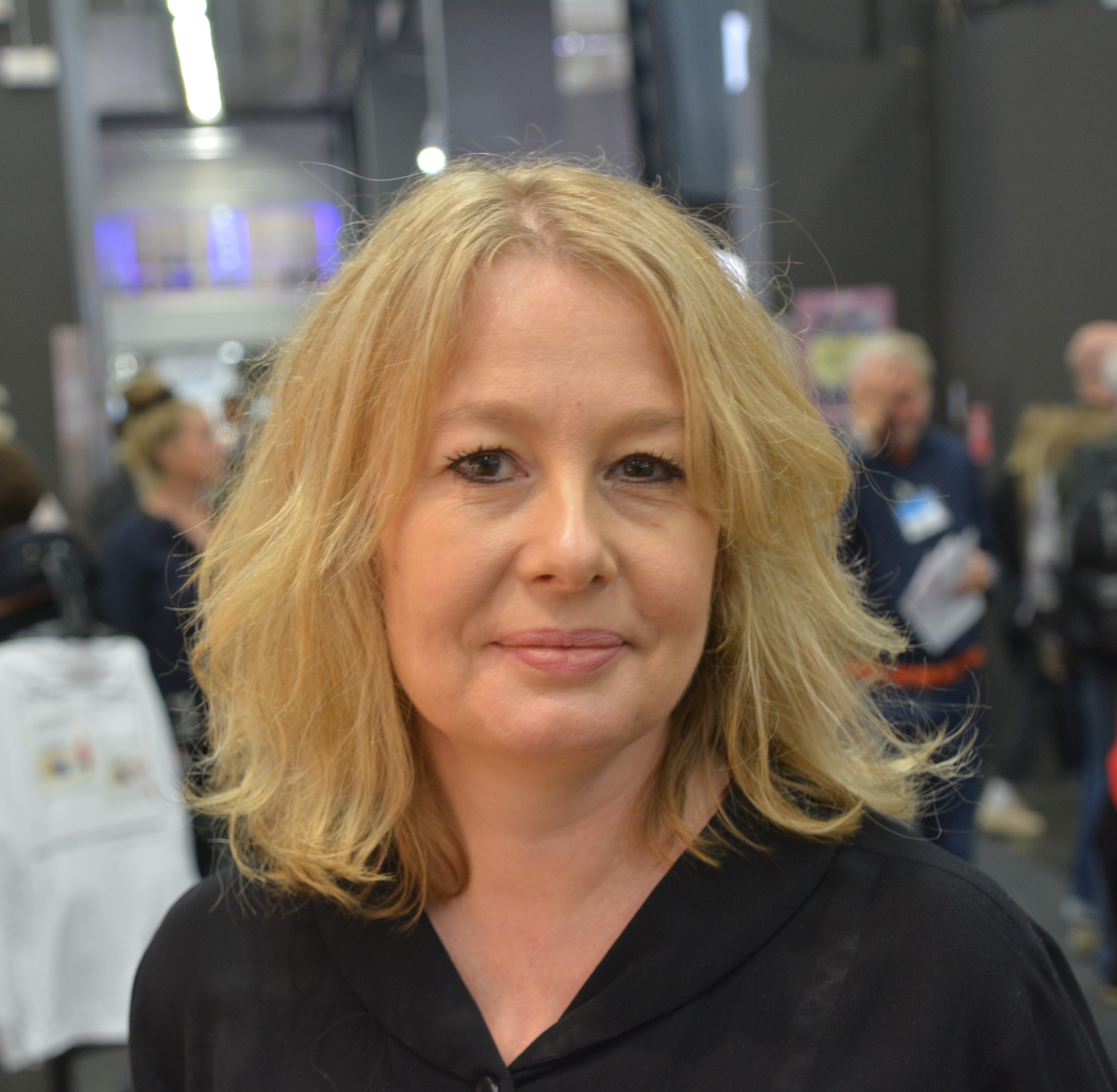
- Åsa Linderborg in September 2018.
- Born: 20 May 1968; Västerås, Sweden
- Occupations: writer, columnist, historian
- Writing career
- Language: Swedish

Åsa Natacha Linderborg (née Andersson, born 20 May 1968) is a Swedish writer, columnist and historian . She writes regularly for Aftonbladet, where she works as chief cultural editor.

== Early life and career ==
Åsa Linderborg was born in the city of Västerås, where she also grew up. Her father worked as a metalworker and her mother, Tanja Linderborg, is a former politician and Member of Parliament for the Left Party. Åsa Linderborg herself became a member of the Left Party – Communists in 1980 and the following year of its youth wing, the Communist Youth. In 1987, she became an ombudsman for the Communist Youth in Mälardalen. Linderborg graduated with a Ph.D. in history from Uppsala University in 2001 with the dissertation Socialdemokraterna skriver historia: Historieskrivning som ideologisk maktresurs ("Social Democrats Write History: History Writing Used as an Ideological Power Resource"), about the Swedish Social Democratic Party.

Mig äger ingen (Nobody Owns Me), was released. The book received good reviews and was nominated for the August Prize in the category best Swedish-language novel of the year. The book was later the basis for a film of the same name starring Mikael Persbrandt. On 27 March 2008, Linderborg was presented as the new deputy cultural editor of Aftonbladet, with Karin Magnusson becoming the chief cultural editor. In 2009 Linderborg replaced Magnusson as chief cultural editor. Shortly after she moved into this position, the Aftonbladet-Israel controversy erupted due to an article published in Aftonbladet's culture pages on alleged Israeli organ harvesting from Palestinians. After a wave of criticism in 2018–2019 and dismissals in the Press Opinion Council, Linderborg resigned in July 2019 from her position as cultural director to become a senior reporter at the newspaper.

In 2017, accusations of misconduct were published under her responsibility against the theatre director Benny Fredriksson, forcing him to resign, and apparently leading to his suicide three months later.

== Criticism ==
During her tenure as cultural director of Aftonbladet, Åsa Linderborg faced criticism over the paper’s reporting on Stockholm City Theatre director Benny Fredriksson; Aftonbladet was later reprimanded by the Swedish Press Opinion Council (PON) for its coverage of the case, which sparked a broader debate about media ethics. Linderborg later reflected on the episode and #MeToo-era journalism in interviews and in her book Året med 13 månader (The Year with 13 Months).

In 2019, Aftonbladet Kultur was also censured by PON for a column alleging that Russia scholar Martin Kragh had cooperated with British intelligence; the Council held that the publication caused “unjustified publicity damage.” Linderborg took part in the Institute for Media Studies’ work examining Swedish media ethics after #MeToo, including analyses by Torbjörn von Krogh of Aftonbladet’s Fredriksson coverage presented in June 2020.

== Awards ==
- 2007 – ABF:s litteraturpris
- 2007 – BMF-plaketten
- 2007 – Lundequistska bokhandelns litteraturpris
- 2008 – Ivar Lo-Johanssons personliga pris
