= Gustaf Sparre (speaker) =

Swedish politician

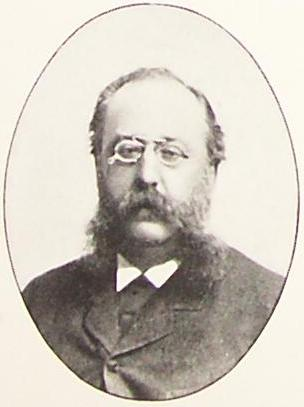
Gustaf Sparre (from Svenskt Porträttgalleri, part XXV:1, 1904)

Count Nils Gustaf Alexander Sparre (31 May 1834 – 4 September 1914) was a Swedish statesman who served as Speaker of the First Chamber from 1896 to 1908.

He was married to Sophie Gustafva Sparre, daughter of Gustaf Adolf Vive Sparre and Sofia Bonde.

== Biography ==
Sparre was born on 31 May 1834 in Norra Fågelås parish, Skaraborg County to Johan Alexander Artemis Sparre and Sofia Adelaide Rosalie Anker. He was member of the Första kammaren between 1871 and 1908 and Speaker of Första kammaren between 1896 and 1908.
