= Gunnar Larsson (politician) =

Swedish politician

Gunnar Larsson (politician) (1908-1996) was a Swedish politician. He was a member of the Centre Party and represented Skaraborg County.

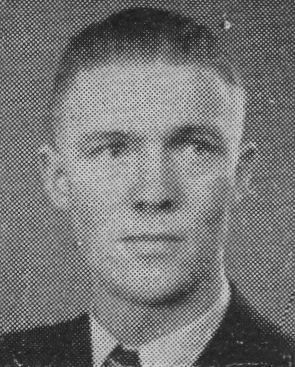
Gunnar Larsson
