= Committee on the Labour Market =

Swedish parliamentary committee

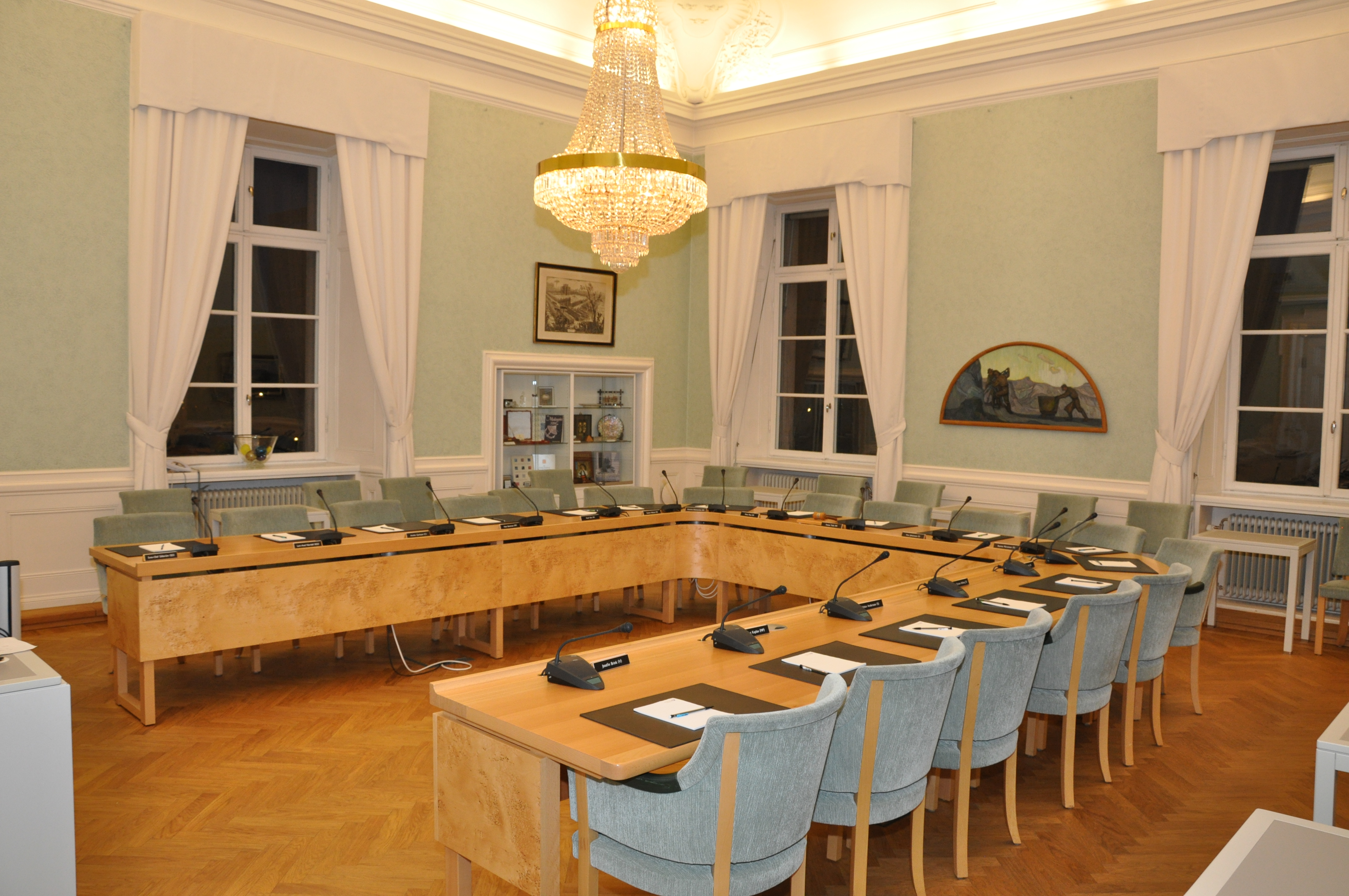
Labour Market Committee meeting place in the Parliament House, Stockholm

The (Parliamentary) Committee on the Labour Market (Swedish: Arbetsmarknadsutskottet, AU) is a parliamentary committee in the Swedish Riksdag. The committee's areas of responsibility concern active labour market policies, working condition policies, working life policies, labour laws, along with gender equality between men and women on the labour market and the working life. The committee was first implemented into the Riksdag during the parliament year of 1975/1976, it served as a successor to the Committee on Home Affairs (Swedish: Inrikesutskottet).

The Speaker for the committee is Magnus Persson from the Sweden Democrats and the vice-Speaker is Ardalan Shekarabi from the Social Democrats.

== List of speakers for the committee ==
Name	Period	Political party
Elver Jonsson	1978–1982	People's Party
Frida Berglund	1982–1988	Swedish Social Democratic Party
Lars Ulander	1988–1991	Swedish Social Democratic Party
Mona Sahlin	1991–1992	Swedish Social Democratic Party
Ingela Thalén	1992–1994	Swedish Social Democratic Party
Johnny Ahlqvist	1994–2000	Swedish Social Democratic Party
Sven-Erik Österberg	2000–2002	Swedish Social Democratic Party
Anders Karlsson	2002–2006	Swedish Social Democratic Party
Catharina Elmsäter-Svärd	2006–2008	Moderate Party
Hillevi Engström	2008–2010	Moderate Party
Tomas Tobé	2010–2012	Moderate Party
Elisabeth Svantesson	2012-2013	Moderate Party
Jessica Polfjärd	2013–2014	Moderate Party
Raimo Pärssinen	2014–2018	Swedish Social Democratic Party
Anna Johansson	2018–2022	Swedish Social Democratic Party
Magnus Persson	2022–2024	Sweden Democrats

Ardalan Shekarabi

== List of vice-speakers for the committee ==
Name	Period	Political party	Notes
Elver Jonsson	1985–1998	People's Party/Liberal People's Party	
Margareta Andersson	1998–2006	Centre Party	
Sven-Erik Österberg	2006–2008	Swedish Social Democratic Party	
Hillevi Engström	2008–2010	Swedish Social Democratic Party	
Ylva Johansson	2010-2014	Swedish Social Democratic Party	
Ulf Kristersson	2014	Moderate Party	
Elisabeth Svantesson	2014–2017	Moderate Party	
Jessica Polfjärd	2017–2018	Moderate Party	
Gulan Avci	2018–2020	Liberal Party	
Erik Bengtzboe	2019	Moderate Party	Second vice-Speaker
Mats Green	2019–2022	Moderate Party	Second vice-Speaker
Arman Teimouri	2020–2021	Liberal Party	
Roger Haddad	2021–2022	Liberal Party	
Teresa Carvalho	2022–2024	Swedish Social Democratic Party	
Ardalan Shekarabi	2024–	Swedish Social Democratic Party	

== See also ==
Sveriges arbetsmarknadspolitik (Sweden's labour policies)
