= Third Law Committee =

The Third Law Committee (Swedish: Tredje lagutskottet, R LU), was a committee in the Swedish Riksdag, created in 1949 during the bicameral period of Sweden. The committee's areas of responsibility of the Second Law Committee concern, the legislation of Sweden's agriculture. The committee was replaced in the unicameral parliament by the agriculture committee.

The committee was defunct at the abolition of the bicameral Riksdag in 1971 along with the First Law Committee, and the Second Law Committee.

== Presidents ==
- Åke Holmbäck (1950–1952)
- Hugo Osvald (1953–1962)
- Erik Alexanderson (1963–1968)
- Erik Grebäck (1969–1970)

== Secretaries ==
- Gudmund Ernulf (1954–1955)
- Ingvar Gullnäs (1960–1961)
- Böret Palm (1961–1962)
- Henry Montgomery (1962–1962)
