= Gulan Avci =

Swedish politician (born 1977)

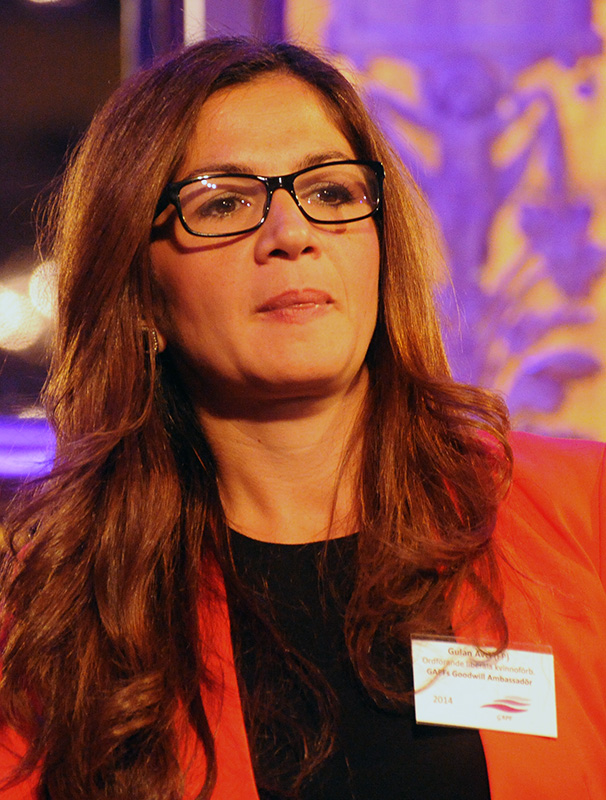
Gulan Avci ( 2015)

Gulan Avci (born 20 August 1977) is a Swedish politician of Kurdish descent, representing the Liberal Party.

She was elected deputy Member of Parliament in 2006 and served March – September 2009 and February – April 2010. In March 2010, she broke with her party line and voted in favor of the Recognition of the Armenian Genocide in Swedish Parliament. She was the Chair of the Liberal women in 2014–2019. Avci was chairperson of the Kurdish Youth of Sweden between 1998 and 2000.

She was married to fellow liberal politician Fredrik Malm.
