= Johan Forssell (politician, born 1855) =

Swedish politician (1855–1914)

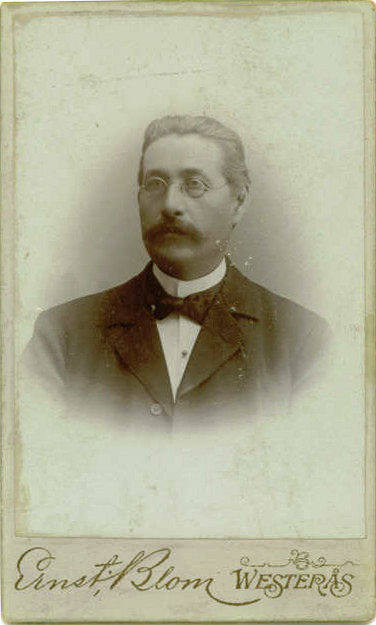

Member of the Parliament of Sweden
- In office 1903–1905 and 1909–1914

Personal details
- Born: 16 March 1855 Hökhuvud
- Died: 18 September 1914 (aged 59) Svedvi
- Party: Liberal, later Social Democrat
- Occupation: politician and teacher

Johan Forssell (referred to in Parliament as "Forssell in Kolbäck", later "Forssell in Hallstahammar"), born 16 March 1855 in Hökhuvud, died 18 September 1914 in Svedvi, was a Swedish school teacher and politician (Liberal, later Social Democrat) who was a member of the Parliament of Sweden.

Forssell was active in Kolbäck as a primary school teacher from 1878. He was a member of parliament in the second chamber 1903–1905 and 1909–1914, until 1911 for Västmanland County southern circuit constituency and from 1912 to Västmanland county west constituency. During the period, 1903–1905, he belonged to the Liberal Coalition Party, but he later joined to the Swedish Social Democratic Party and was one of their candidates at the 1908 election. His parliamentary activities included being a substitute in the banking committee 1912–1914 and a regular member of that committee in 1914. He advocated reduced government spending.

Johan Forssell was also a beekeeper, as described in the December 3, 1896, issue of the British Bee Journal.
