= First Law Committee =

The First Law Committee (Swedish: Första lagutskottet, 1 LU), was a committee in the Swedish Riksdag during the bicameral period of Sweden. The committee's main areas of responsibility are Dirst Law Committee, legislation was in the field of criminal law and civil law.

The committee was defunct at the abolition of the bicameral Riksdag in 1971 along with the Second Law Committee, and the Third Law Committee.
