= Veronica Palm =

Swedish politician (born 1973)

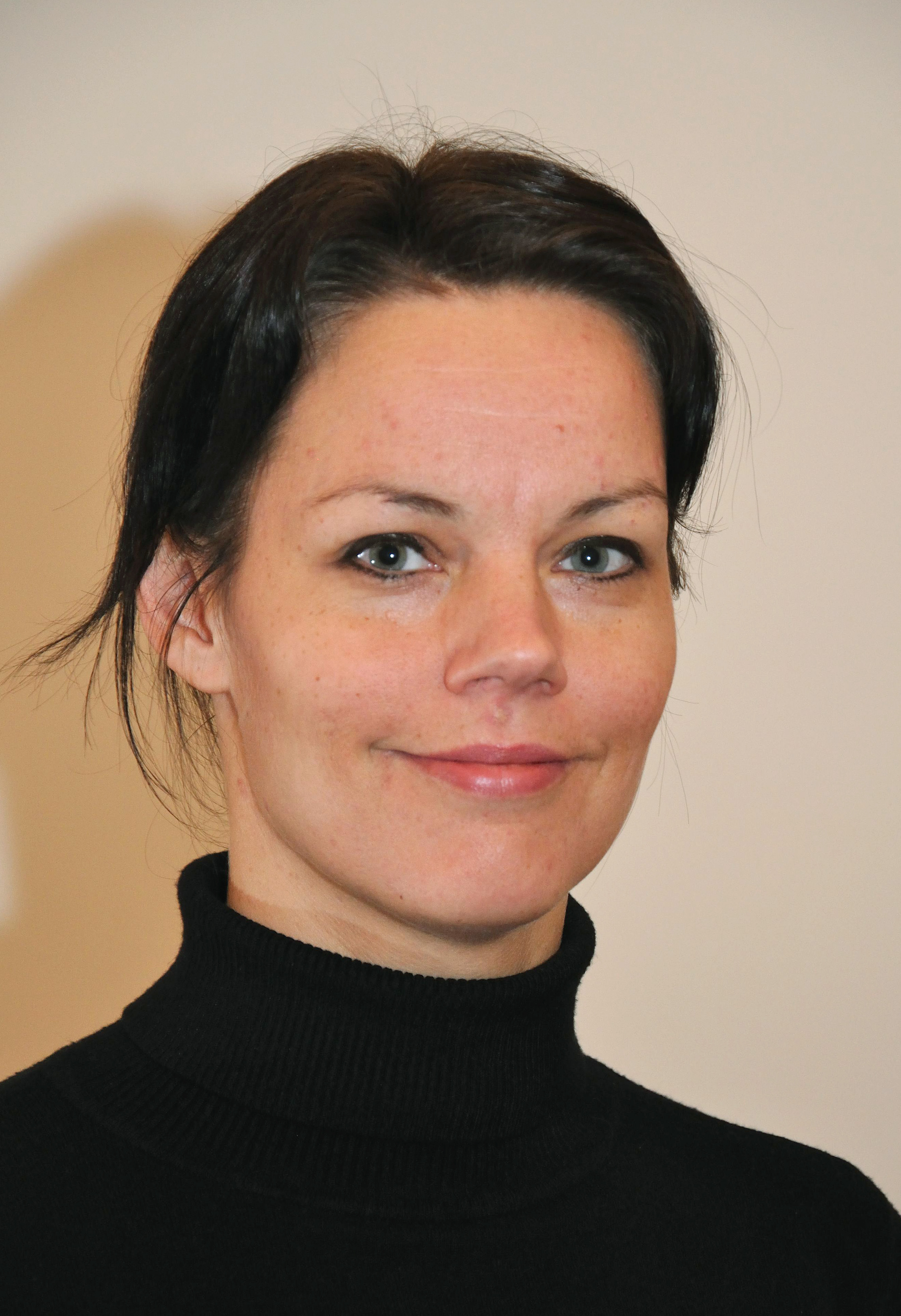

Member of the Swedish Riksdag for the City of Stockholm
- In office 30 September 2002 – 30 September 2015

Personal details
- Born: 1973 (age 52–53) Karlskrona, Sweden
- Party: Social Democrats
- Spouse: Roger Mogert
- Children: 3
- Education: Linköping University

Veronica Palm (born 1973) is a Swedish author and former Social Democratic politician. She was Member of the Swedish Riksdag from 2002 to 2015. She was also chairman of the Stockholm Labour Commune from 2009 to 2016.

She was born in 1973 in Karlskrona, Sweden. She grew up in Kisa and studied at Linköping University. She was married to Social Democratic politician Roger Mogert until their divorce in 2013. She has three daughters. She made her debut as a novelist in 2021 with Inte alla män.
