= Swedish Parliament Act of 1810 =

The 1810 Riksdag Act was passed by Parliament on 10 February 1810 during the reign of Charles XIII. It replaced the order of the estates meetings in 1617 reintroduced by Gustav III via the Union and Security Act instead of the Riksdag Act 1723. The 1810 parliamentary regime was adopted after Sweden lost Finland and Gustav IV Adolf was pushed aside in a coup. Charles XIII was subsequently appointed regent and then king, and after that a new form of government, the Government of 1809, was adopted. A notice of parliament which adopted the parliamentary order was issued in March 1809.
