= Jennie Nilsson =

Swedish politician (born 1972)

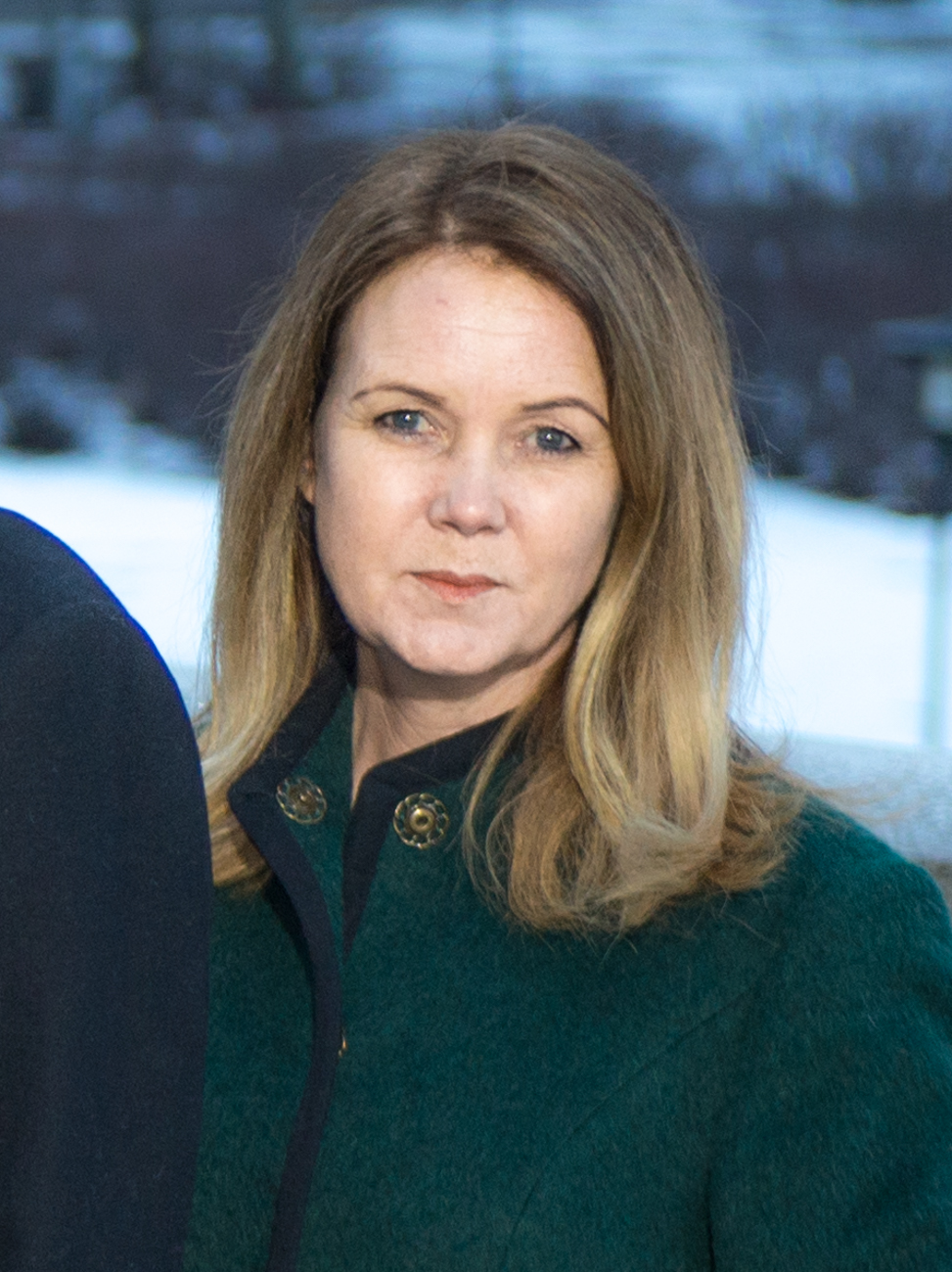
- Jennie Nilsson in January 2019 following her appointment as cabinet minister.

Minister for Rural Affairs
- In office 21 January 2019 – 30 June 2021
- Monarch: Carl XVI Gustaf
- Prime Minister: Stefan Löfven
- Preceded by: Sven-Erik Bucht
- Succeeded by: Office merged with the Minister for Enterprise (Ibrahim Baylan)

Member of the Riksdag
- Incumbent
- Assumed office 30 June 2021
- In office 2 October 2006 – 21 January 2019
- Constituency: Halland County

Personal details
- Born: 25 January 1972 (age 54) Torup, Halland County, Sweden
- Party: Social Democrats

Jennie Gaby Christel Nilsson (born 25 January 1972) is a Swedish politician of the Social Democrats. She served as Minister for Rural Affairs in the Löfven cabinet from January 2019 to June 2021 and has been Member of the Riksdag since October 2006, representing her home constituency Halland County.

Before being elected to the Riksdag in 2006, Nilsson served as Mayor of Hylte Municipality from 2001 to 2006.
