= Västmanland County (Riksdag constituency) =

Constituency of the Riksdag, the national legislature of Sweden

- Västmanlands Län
- Constituency for the Riksdag
- Location of Västmanland County within Sweden
- County: Västmanland
- Population: 280,762 (2025)
- Electorate: 213,804 (2026)
- Area: 5,686 km^{2} (2026)

Current constituency
- Created: 1970
- Seats: List (Note: Constituency seats only.): 8 (2006–present); 9 (1970–2006)
- Member of the Riksdag: List: Hawar Asaiesh (V); Tomas Brandberg (SD); Jonas Cronert (S); Mikael Damsgaard (M); Åsa Eriksson (S); Roger Haddad (L); Caroline Högström (M); Amanda Lindblad (S); Oscar Sjöstedt (SD)
- Created from: Västmanland County

Västmanland County (Swedish: Västmanlands Län) is one of the 29 multi-member constituencies of the Riksdag, the national legislature of Sweden. The constituency was established in 1970 when the Riksdag changed from a bicameral legislature to a unicameral legislature. It is conterminous with the county of Västmanland. The constituency currently elects eight of the 349 members of the Riksdag using the open party-list proportional representation electoral system. At the 2026 general election it had 213,804 registered electors.

== Electoral system ==
Västmanland County currently elects eight of the 349 members of the Riksdag using the open party-list proportional representation electoral system. Constituency seats are allocated using the modified Sainte-Laguë method. Only parties that reach the 4% national threshold and parties that receive at least 12% of the vote in the constituency compete for constituency seats. Supplementary levelling seats may also be allocated at the constituency level to parties that reach the 4% national threshold.

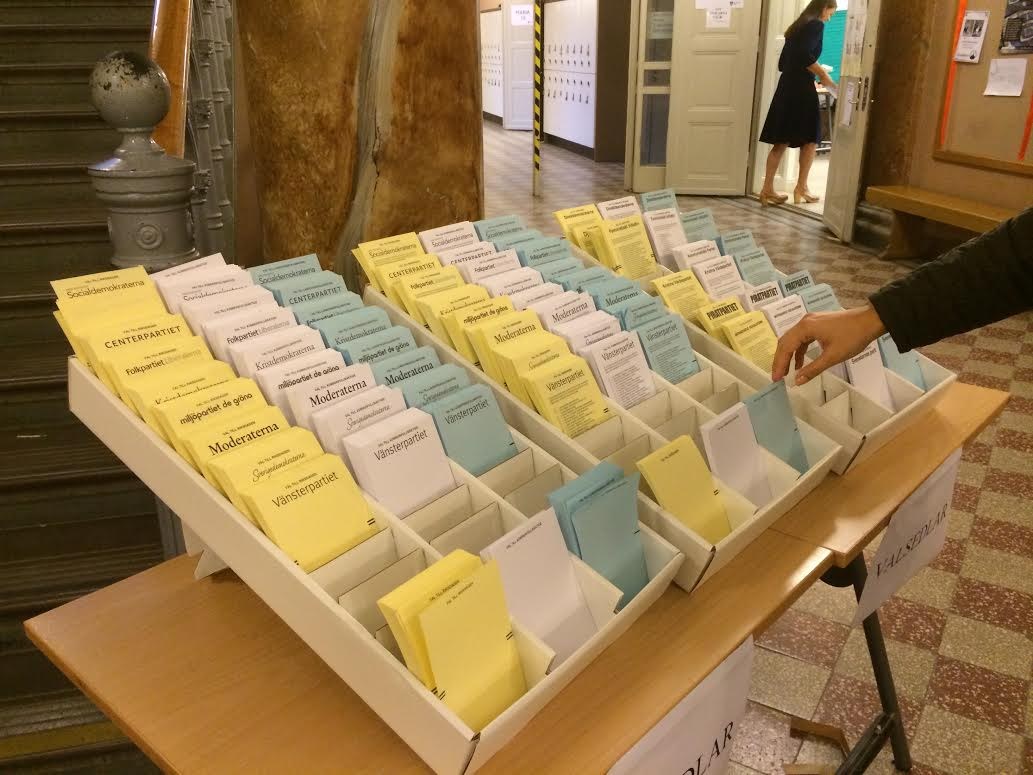
A selection of ballot papers available for voters at the 2014 general election in Stockholm - yellow for the Riksdag, blue for the regional council and white for the municipal council

Prior to 1997 voters could cast any ballot paper they wanted, though it had to contain the name of a party and the name of at least one candidate nominated by that party in the constituency. It was common for parties to hand out ballot papers with their name and list of candidates at the entrance of polling stations. Voters could delete the names of candidates or write-in the names of other candidates but in practice these options weren't used enough by voters to have any significant impact on the results and consequently elections operated as a closed system.

Since 1997, elections in Sweden follow the French model in having separate ballot papers for each party/list in a constituency. There are two ballot papers for each party - a party ballot paper (partivalsedel) with just the name of the party and a name ballot paper (namnvalsedel) with the name of the party and its list of candidates. There are also blank ballot papers (blank valsedel). Voters can initially pick as many ballot papers as they wish and then, in the secrecy of the voting booth, they select a single ballot paper of their choice. If they chose a name ballot paper they have the option of casting a preferential vote for one of their chosen party's candidates. If they chose a blank ballot paper they can write the name of any party including unregistered parties and, optionally, they can write the name of any person as their preferred candidate, even one that does not belong to their chosen party. They then place their chosen ballot paper in an envelope which is placed in the ballot box, discarding all other ballot papers they picked.

Seats won by each party/list in a constituency are allocated to its candidates in order of preference votes (a personal mandate), provided that the candidate has received at least 8% of votes cast for their party in the constituency (5% since January 2011). Any unfilled seats are then allocated to the party's remaining candidates in the order they appear on the party list (a party mandate).

== Election results ==
=== Summary ===
Election	Left V / VPK			Social Democrats S			Greens MP			Centre C			Liberals L / FP / F			Moderates M			Christian Democrats KD / KDS			Sweden Democrats SD		
Election	Votes	%	Seats	Votes	%	Seats	Votes	%	Seats	Votes	%	Seats	Votes	%	Seats	Votes	%	Seats	Votes	%	Seats	Votes	%	Seats
2026	14,087	7.98%	1	53,813	30.47%	3	6,600	3.74%	0	9,360	5.30%	0	8,893	5.03%	0	34,854	19.73%	2	9,894	5.60%	0	35,997	20.38%	2
2022	10,475	6.13%	1	54,645	32.00%	3	5,465	3.20%	0	9,224	5.40%	0	7,100	4.16%	0	32,671	19.13%	2	8,554	5.01%	0	40,415	23.67%	2
2018	12,181	7.05%	1	54,287	31.43%	3	5,108	2.96%	0	11,539	6.68%	0	9,448	5.47%	0	33,122	19.18%	2	9,969	5.77%	0	34,740	20.11%	2
2014	9,051	5.42%	0	59,936	35.90%	4	8,549	5.12%	0	8,719	5.22%	0	8,756	5.25%	0	35,697	21.38%	2	6,496	3.89%	0	24,728	14.81%	2
2010	9,154	5.72%	0	58,222	36.36%	4	9,459	5.91%	0	8,266	5.16%	0	12,016	7.50%	1	43,462	27.14%	3	7,406	4.62%	0	9,992	6.24%	0
2006	9,211	6.21%	0	59,014	39.79%	4	6,308	4.25%	0	10,186	6.87%	1	12,076	8.14%	1	34,533	23.29%	2	8,502	5.73%	0	3,717	2.51%	0
2002	13,010	8.71%	1	67,153	44.97%	5	6,504	4.36%	0	8,538	5.72%	0	19,855	13.30%	1	18,488	12.38%	1	11,957	8.01%	1	1,690	1.13%	0
1998	20,052	13.31%	1	61,841	41.06%	5	6,547	4.35%	0	7,043	4.68%	0	6,791	4.51%	0	29,902	19.85%	2	16,260	10.80%	1			
1994	10,361	6.31%	0	84,194	51.24%	6	7,659	4.66%	0	9,938	6.05%	0	11,837	7.20%	1	31,160	18.96%	2	5,494	3.34%	0			
1991	7,175	4.42%	0	71,610	44.08%	5	4,530	2.79%	0	11,135	6.85%	0	15,734	9.69%	1	28,776	17.71%	2	10,399	6.40%	0			
1988	9,231	5.81%	0	79,629	50.16%	5	7,149	4.50%	0	15,279	9.62%	1	20,175	12.71%	1	22,303	14.05%	2	3,589	2.26%	0			
1985	8,847	5.29%	0	86,496	51.70%	5	2,165	1.29%	0	17,480	10.45%	1	23,147	13.84%	1	28,515	17.04%	2	with C					
1982	9,285	5.53%	0	88,427	52.64%	6	2,337	1.39%	0	22,595	13.45%	1	9,838	5.86%	0	32,525	19.36%	2	2,587	1.54%	0			
1979	8,411	5.13%	0	82,811	50.48%	5				25,406	15.49%	1	17,622	10.74%	1	26,401	16.09%	2	1,741	1.06%	0			
1976	7,110	4.35%	0	82,245	50.27%	5				34,361	21.00%	2	18,311	11.19%	1	18,936	11.57%	1	1,944	1.19%	0			
1973	8,113	5.22%	0	78,965	50.81%	5				36,099	23.23%	2	14,060	9.05%	1	15,086	9.71%	1	2,216	1.43%	0			
1970	7,097	4.78%	0	79,523	53.52%	5				26,440	17.79%	2	22,044	14.84%	1	10,796	7.27%	1	2,062	1.39%	0			

(Excludes levelling seats. Figures in italics represent alliances/joint lists.)

=== Detailed ===
Party has received at least 4% of the vote nationally and is entitled to compete for constituency seats.

==== 2020s ====
===== 2026 =====
Results of the 2026 general election held on 13 September 2026:

Party		Votes per municipality										Total votes	%	Seats		
Party		Arboga	Fagersta	Hallsta- hammar	Köping	Kungsör	Norberg	Sala	Skinns- katteberg	Sura- hammar	Västerås	Total votes	%	Con.	Lev.	Tot.
Swedish Social Democratic Party	S	2,867	2,566	3,319	5,013	1,520	1,142	4,297	841	1,843	30,405	53,813	30.47%	3	0	3
Sweden Democrats	SD	2,055	1,769	2,611	3,998	1,364	789	3,511	788	1,879	17,233	35,997	20.38%	2	0	2
Moderate Party	M	1,684	1,274	1,709	2,694	1,000	609	2,779	364	1,016	21,725	34,854	19.73%	2	0	2
Left Party	V	572	730	769	1,266	410	229	923	163	316	8,709	14,087	7.98%	1	0	1
Christian Democrats	KD	529	371	503	1,009	314	205	967	163	334	5,499	9,894	5.60%	0	0	0
Centre Party	C	468	229	416	672	296	129	1,057	90	176	5,827	9,360	5.30%	0	0	0
Liberals	L	416	317	424	641	249	174	656	152	232	5,632	8,893	5.03%	0	1	1
Green Party	MP	354	213	308	432	156	131	539	88	164	4,215	6,600	3.74%	0	0	0
Örebro Party	ÖP	137	65	75	151	64	25	123	51	49	680	1,420	0.80%	0	0	0
Alternative for Sweden	AfS	43	63	60	89	33	15	68	16	28	370	785	0.44%	0	0	0
Pirate Party	PP	4	2	16	19	7	3	7	5	2	140	205	0.12%	0	0	0
Christian Values Party	KrVP	8	6	3	13	9	3	23	1	2	118	186	0.11%	0	0	0
Ambition Sweden	AS	7	3	17	15	6	6	17	3	3	79	156	0.09%	0	0	0
Citizens' Coalition	MED	6	8	16	7	2	3	5	2	4	59	112	0.06%	0	0	0
Communist Party of Sweden	SKP	0	3	3	1	0	4	5	0	3	62	81	0.05%	0	0	0
Human Rights and Democracy	MoD	14	7	4	6	5	2	4	1	0	22	65	0.04%	0	0	0
Nordic Resistance Movement	NMR	0	2	0	1	1	1	1	0	2	11	19	0.01%	0	0	0
Direct Democrats	DD	2	1	0	5	0	0	1	0	0	8	17	0.01%	0	0	0
Independent Rural Party	LPo	0	0	0	3	1	1	3	0	0	3	11	0.01%	0	0	0
United Voice	ER	0	0	2	0	0	0	0	0	0	9	11	0.01%	0	0	0
Donald Duck Party		0	1	1	0	0	1	2	2	0	3	10	0.01%	0	0	0
Volt Sweden	Volt	1	0	1	1	0	0	0	0	0	6	9	0.01%	0	0	0
RegleraAI.nu		5	2	0	0	0	0	0	0	0	1	8	0.00%	0	0	0
Nuance Party	PNy	0	0	0	1	0	0	0	0	0	4	5	0.00%	0	0	0
Unity	ENH	0	0	0	0	0	0	0	0	1	3	4	0.00%	0	0	0
Communist Party	K	0	0	0	1	0	0	0	0	0	2	3	0.00%	0	0	0
The Push Buttons	Kn	0	0	0	0	0	0	1	0	0	2	3	0.00%	0	0	0
A Good Sweden		0	0	0	0	0	0	0	0	0	2	2	0.00%	0	0	0
Animal Lovers' Party		0	0	0	0	0	0	0	0	1	1	2	0.00%	0	0	0
Pax		0	0	0	0	0	2	0	0	0	0	2	0.00%	0	0	0
Secular Humanist Party		0	0	0	0	0	1	0	0	0	1	2	0.00%	0	0	0
Turning Point Party	PV	0	0	0	0	0	0	0	1	0	1	2	0.00%	0	0	0
Classical Liberal Party	KLP	0	1	0	0	0	0	0	0	0	0	1	0.00%	0	0	0
Evil Chicken Party	OKP	0	0	0	0	0	0	0	0	0	1	1	0.00%	0	0	0
Friends of Hemp		0	0	0	0	0	0	0	0	0	1	1	0.00%	0	0	0
Jesus		0	0	1	0	0	0	0	0	0	0	1	0.00%	0	0	0
Naturist Party		0	0	0	0	0	0	0	0	0	1	1	0.00%	0	0	0
New Allance		0	0	0	0	0	0	0	0	0	1	1	0.00%	0	0	0
O		1	0	0	0	0	0	0	0	0	0	1	0.00%	0	0	0
The Libertarians		0	0	0	0	0	0	0	0	0	1	1	0.00%	0	0	0
United Sweden		0	0	0	1	0	0	0	0	0	0	1	0.00%	0	0	0
Vision Party		0	0	0	0	0	0	0	0	0	1	1	0.00%	0	0	0
Valid votes		9,173	7,633	10,258	16,039	5,437	3,475	14,989	2,731	6,055	100,838	176,628	100.00%	8	1	9
Blank votes		103	87	106	165	75	50	169	31	92	919	1,797	1.01%			
Rejected votes – unregistered parties		0	2	0	2	1	1	1	0	1	5	13	0.01%			
Rejected votes – other		10	12	12	12	6	7	11	4	2	100	176	0.10%			
Total polled		9,286	7,734	10,376	16,218	5,519	3,533	15,170	2,766	6,150	101,862	178,614	83.54%			
Registered electors		10,995	9,608	12,488	19,776	6,528	4,223	17,627	3,357	7,400	121,802	213,804				
Turnout		84.46%	80.50%	83.09%	82.01%	84.54%	83.66%	86.06%	82.39%	83.11%	83.63%	83.54%				

The following candidates were elected:

- Constituency seats (personal mandates) - Hawar Asaiesh (V), 1,809 votes; and Caroline Högström (M), 1,801 votes;
- Constituency seats (party mandates) - Tomas Brandberg (SD), 2 votes; Jonas Cronert (S), 996 votes; Mikael Damsgaard (M), 879 votes; Åsa Eriksson (S), 1,792 votes; Amanda Lindblad (S), 1,061 votes; and Oscar Sjöstedt (SD), 76 votes.
- Levelling seats (personal mandates) - Roger Haddad (L), 841 votes.

===== 2022 =====
Results of the 2022 general election held on 11 September 2022:

Party		Votes per municipality										Total votes	%	Seats		
Party		Arboga	Fagersta	Hallsta- hammar	Köping	Kungsör	Norberg	Sala	Skinns- katteberg	Sura- hammar	Västerås	Total votes	%	Con.	Lev.	Tot.
Swedish Social Democratic Party	S	3,069	2,715	3,531	5,191	1,747	1,324	4,518	958	2,148	29,444	54,645	32.00%	3	0	3
Sweden Democrats	SD	2,324	2,127	2,852	4,656	1,580	925	4,026	876	2,086	18,963	40,415	23.67%	2	0	2
Moderate Party	M	1,600	1,127	1,498	2,340	884	512	2,487	324	859	21,040	32,671	19.13%	2	0	2
Left Party	V	437	587	601	1,009	244	276	790	145	312	6,074	10,475	6.13%	1	0	1
Centre Party	C	474	252	437	780	283	107	1,074	114	170	5,533	9,224	5.40%	0	0	0
Christian Democrats	KD	434	368	492	1,016	325	165	828	147	274	4,505	8,554	5.01%	0	0	0
Liberals	L	324	189	293	440	200	112	440	117	155	4,830	7,100	4.16%	0	0	0
Green Party	MP	316	186	264	352	134	104	441	77	119	3,472	5,465	3.20%	0	0	0
Nuance Party	PNy	7	11	12	24	4	4	11	0	2	368	443	0.26%	0	0	0
Alternative for Sweden	AfS	25	25	45	46	11	13	36	7	27	172	407	0.24%	0	0	0
Citizens' Coalition	MED	19	8	19	18	11	7	23	6	7	195	313	0.18%	0	0	0
Pirate Party	PP	11	6	24	11	7	2	30	1	2	88	182	0.11%	0	0	0
The Push Buttons	Kn	10	9	8	23	1	6	21	1	8	83	170	0.10%	0	0	0
Christian Values Party	KrVP	10	8	6	12	3	3	22	0	0	80	144	0.08%	0	0	0
Human Rights and Democracy	MoD	7	1	13	9	6	7	6	1	1	88	139	0.08%	0	0	0
Independent Rural Party	LPo	2	2	13	6	7	10	23	5	1	9	78	0.05%	0	0	0
Feminist Initiative	FI	4	1	9	3	0	3	9	2	4	34	69	0.04%	0	0	0
Communist Party of Sweden	SKP	1	0	0	1	0	2	3	0	0	37	44	0.03%	0	0	0
Direct Democrats	DD	3	3	2	3	3	1	1	0	3	24	43	0.03%	0	0	0
Nordic Resistance Movement	NMR	0	3	1	5	1	1	3	1	2	26	43	0.03%	0	0	0
Unity	ENH	1	5		4	0	1	3	1	1	18	34	0.02%	0	0	0
Turning Point Party	PV	0	0	0	5	0	0	4	0	0	22	31	0.02%	0	0	0
Climate Alliance	KA	2	0	0	0	2	1	3	0	0	10	18	0.01%	0	0	0
Hard Line Sweden		0	1	0	1	1	0	0	0	3	2	8	0.00%	0	0	0
Donald Duck Party		1	0	3	0	0	1	0	0	1	1	7	0.00%	0	0	0
Basic Income Party	BASIP	0	0	1	0	0	0	2	0	0	2	5	0.00%	0	0	0
Socialist Welfare Party	S-V	0	0	0	0	0	0	0	1	0	4	5	0.00%	0	0	0
Classical Liberal Party	KLP	0	0	0	0	0	0	0	1	0	2	3	0.00%	0	0	0
Freedom Party		0	0	1	0	0	0	0	0	0	2	3	0.00%	0	0	0
Sweden Out of the EU/ Free Justice Party		0	0	0	0	1	0	0	2	0	0	3	0.00%	0	0	0
Evil Chicken Party	OKP	0	0	0	0	0	0	1	0	0	1	2	0.00%	0	0	0
Volt Sweden	Volt	0	0	0	1	0	0	0	0	0	1	2	0.00%	0	0	0
European Workers Party	EAP	0	0	0	0	1	0	0	0	0	0	1	0.00%	0	0	0
Neotechnocrats		0	0	0	0	0	0	0	0	0	1	1	0.00%	0	0	0
New Democracy		0	0	0	0	0	0	0	0	0	1	1	0.00%	0	0	0
Now That Will Be Enough		0	0	0	0	0	0	0	0	0	1	1	0.00%	0	0	0
Valid votes		9,081	7,634	10,125	15,956	5,456	3,587	14,805	2,787	6,185	95,133	170,749	100.00%	8	0	8
Blank votes		103	115	112	154	76	52	203	42	79	996	1,932	1.12%			
Rejected votes – unregistered parties		3	2	3	5	0	0	1	0	3	13	30	0.02%			
Rejected votes – other		8	8	7	18	4	1	9	2	6	68	131	0.08%			
Total polled		9,195	7,759	10,247	16,133	5,536	3,640	15,018	2,831	6,273	96,210	172,842	82.95%			
Registered electors		10,941	9,607	12,314	19,584	6,521	4,352	17,496	3,403	7,495	116,663	208,376				
Turnout		84.04%	80.76%	83.21%	82.38%	84.89%	83.64%	85.84%	83.19%	83.70%	82.47%	82.95%				

The following candidates were elected:

- Constituency seats (personal mandates) - Mikael Damsgaard (M), 1,908 votes; and Vasiliki Tsouplaki (V), 777 votes.
- Constituency seats (party mandates) - Åsa Eriksson (S), 1,641 votes; Caroline Högström (M), 621 votes; Lena Johansson (S), 1.119 votes; Angelica Lundberg (SD), 0 votes; Oscar Sjöstedt (SD), 105 votes; and Olle Thorell (S), 1,105 votes;

==== 2010s ====
===== 2018 =====
Results of the 2018 general election held on 9 September 2018:

Party		Votes per municipality										Total votes	%	Seats		
Party		Arboga	Fagersta	Hallsta- hammar	Köping	Kungsör	Norberg	Sala	Skinns- katteberg	Sura- hammar	Västerås	Total votes	%	Con.	Lev.	Tot.
Swedish Social Democratic Party	S	3,117	3,083	3,638	5,674	1,688	1,366	4,384	1,102	2,272	27,963	54,287	31.43%	3	0	3
Sweden Democrats	SD	2,004	1,798	2,340	3,923	1,284	809	3,326	723	1,719	16,814	34,740	20.11%	2	0	2
Moderate Party	M	1,724	1,106	1,478	2,562	894	528	2,400	307	809	21,314	33,122	19.18%	2	0	2
Left Party	V	531	622	802	1,054	314	357	939	188	511	6,863	12,181	7.05%	1	0	1
Centre Party	C	629	328	532	1,105	459	214	1,761	191	250	6,070	11,539	6.68%	0	0	0
Christian Democrats	KD	473	367	511	960	301	153	903	113	260	5,928	9,969	5.77%	0	0	0
Liberals	L	357	250	402	546	237	141	608	140	210	6,557	9,448	5.47%	0	1	1
Green Party	MP	293	179	224	368	112	94	394	58	119	3,267	5,108	2.96%	0	0	0
Feminist Initiative	FI	21	15	24	32	10	15	66	13	19	352	567	0.33%	0	0	0
Alternative for Sweden	AfS	26	33	30	68	20	22	53	2	22	241	517	0.30%	0	0	0
Citizens' Coalition	MED	18	3	16	17	11	7	29	0	15	199	315	0.18%	0	0	0
Unity	ENH	7	7	17	9	5	10	13	2	6	82	158	0.09%	0	0	0
Independent Rural Party	LPo	5	15	6	15	8	9	29	18	6	39	150	0.09%	0	0	0
Pirate Party	PP	9	3	17	19	14	6	23	2	0	57	150	0.09%	0	0	0
Direct Democrats	DD	7	5	12	19	2	3	9	3	13	76	149	0.09%	0	0	0
Nordic Resistance Movement	NMR	3	6	3	7	5	4	3	2	1	49	83	0.05%	0	0	0
Christian Values Party	KrVP	0	2	0	1	0	1	4	0	0	67	75	0.04%	0	0	0
Animal Party	DjuP	4	0	4	5	4	2	5	0	4	37	65	0.04%	0	0	0
Classical Liberal Party	KLP	1	2	2	0	1	0	5	1	4	18	34	0.02%	0	0	0
Basic Income Party	BASIP	0	0	2	0	0	0	0	0	0	11	13	0.01%	0	0	0
Communist Party of Sweden	SKP	0	0	0	0	0	0	1	0	0	12	13	0.01%	0	0	0
Initiative	INI	1	0	1	2	0	0	0	0	0	5	9	0.01%	0	0	0
NY Reform		0	0	0	0	0	0	0	0	0	4	4	0.00%	0	0	0
European Workers Party	EAP	0	0	0	0	1	0	2	0	0	0	3	0.00%	0	0	0
Scania Party	SKÅ	0	0	0	1	0	0	0	0	0	0	1	0.00%	0	0	0
Parties not on the ballot		3	1	2	3	0	1	1	0	1	7	19	0.01%	0	0	0
Valid votes		9,233	7,825	10,063	16,390	5,370	3,742	14,958	2,865	6,241	96,032	172,719	100.00%	8	1	9
Blank votes		94	96	102	148	70	56	167	26	56	752	1,567	0.90%			
Rejected votes – unregistered parties		7	1	6	5	0	0	3	1	1	24	48	0.03%			
Rejected votes – other		5	11	2	11	3	5	7	3	7	55	109	0.06%			
Total polled		9,339	7,933	10,173	16,554	5,443	3,803	15,135	2,895	6,305	96,863	174,443	86.69%			
Registered electors		10,678	9,411	11,855	19,264	6,167	4,386	17,160	3,392	7,407	111,495	201,215				
Turnout		87.46%	84.29%	85.81%	85.93%	88.26%	86.71%	88.20%	85.35%	85.12%	86.88%	86.69%				

The following candidates were elected:

- Constituency seats (personal mandates) - Jessica Polfjärd (M), 2,475 votes; and Vasiliki Tsouplaki (V), 799 votes.
- Constituency seats (party mandates) - Åsa Coenraads (M), 336 votes; Åsa Eriksson (S), 929 votes; Ann-Christine From Utterstedt (SD), 163 votes; Pia Nilsson (S), 2,000 votes; Oscar Sjöstedt (S), 78 votes; and Olle Thorell (S), 1,297 votes.
- Levelling seats (personal mandates) - Roger Haddad (L), 1,205 votes.

Permanent substitutions:

- Jessica Polfjärd (M) resigned on 1 July 2019 upon being elected to the European Parliament and was replaced by Mikael Damsgaard (M) on 2 July 2019.

===== 2014 =====
Results of the 2014 general election held on 14 September 2014:

Party		Votes per municipality										Total votes	%	Seats		
Party		Arboga	Fagersta	Hallsta- hammar	Köping	Kungsör	Norberg	Sala	Skinns- katteberg	Sura- hammar	Västerås	Total votes	%	Con.	Lev.	Tot.
Swedish Social Democratic Party	S	3,436	3,512	4,343	6,487	1,936	1,447	4,867	1,245	2,833	29,830	59,936	35.90%	4	0	4
Moderate Party	M	1,852	1,209	1,448	2,773	998	535	2,888	388	847	22,759	35,697	21.38%	2	0	2
Sweden Democrats	SD	1,387	1,455	1,606	2,781	931	766	2,238	528	1,151	11,885	24,728	14.81%	2	0	2
Left Party	V	449	508	587	886	268	334	670	185	451	4,713	9,051	5.42%	0	1	1
Liberal People's Party	FP	349	207	370	587	262	107	587	149	213	5,925	8,756	5.25%	0	1	1
Centre Party	C	498	195	369	965	384	163	1,600	187	232	4,126	8,719	5.22%	0	0	0
Green Party	MP	469	326	389	632	193	161	678	86	213	5,402	8,549	5.12%	0	0	0
Christian Democrats	KD	315	205	315	498	235	85	522	70	142	4,109	6,496	3.89%	0	0	0
Feminist Initiative	FI	149	125	126	214	83	105	316	50	92	2,138	3,398	2.04%	0	0	0
Pirate Party	PP	38	39	50	57	17	21	82	10	16	433	763	0.46%	0	0	0
Party of the Swedes	SVP	16	13	18	20	8	6	15	4	36	90	226	0.14%	0	0	0
Unity	ENH	5	4	14	6	4	10	12	1	3	108	167	0.10%	0	0	0
Animal Party	DjuP	5	0	3	8	4	8	6	0	7	92	133	0.08%	0	0	0
Christian Values Party	KrVP	0	0	1	9	1	3	6	0	0	74	94	0.06%	0	0	0
Independent Rural Party	LPo	1	8	2	6	4	10	29	4	2	9	75	0.04%	0	0	0
Direct Democrats	DD	3	1	5	1	0	0	3	0	2	27	42	0.03%	0	0	0
Classical Liberal Party	KLP	0	1	2	0	0	2	1	1	2	14	23	0.01%	0	0	0
Communist Party of Sweden	SKP	0	0	0	1	0	0	0	0	0	9	10	0.01%	0	0	0
Health Party		0	0	1	0	0	0	0	0	0	2	3	0.00%	0	0	0
Swedish Senior Citizen Interest Party	SPI	0	0	0	0	0	0	0	0	0	2	2	0.00%	0	0	0
European Workers Party	EAP	0	0	0	0	0	0	0	0	0	1	1	0.00%	0	0	0
Socialist Justice Party	RS	0	0	0	0	0	0	0	0	0	1	1	0.00%	0	0	0
Parties not on the ballot		3	1	6	7	4	3	9	1	3	32	69	0.04%	0	0	0
Valid votes		8,975	7,809	9,655	15,938	5,332	3,766	14,529	2,909	6,245	91,781	166,939	100.00%	8	2	10
Blank votes		94	84	94	158	54	44	179	19	70	911	1,707	1.01%			
Rejected votes – other		7	2	3	3	0	2	4	0	2	35	58	0.03%			
Total polled		9,076	7,895	9,752	16,099	5,386	3,812	14,712	2,928	6,317	92,727	168,704	85.17%			
Registered electors		10,649	9,457	11,618	19,195	6,249	4,435	17,077	3,447	7,474	108,479	198,080				
Turnout		85.23%	83.48%	83.94%	83.87%	86.19%	85.95%	86.15%	84.94%	84.52%	85.48%	85.17%				

The following candidates were elected:

- Constituency seats (personal mandates) - Jessica Polfjärd (M), 2,266 votes.
- Constituency seats (party mandates) - Jonas Åkerlund (SD), 2 votes; Åsa Coenraads (M), 345 votes; Lars Eriksson (S), 1,028 votes; Stefan Jakobsson (SD), 2 votes; Pia Nilsson (S), 1,716 votes; Olle Thorell (S), 1,537 votes; and Anna Wallén (S), 1,907 votes.
- Levelling seats (personal mandates) - Roger Haddad (FP), 1,158 votes; and Stig Henriksson (V), 776 votes.

Permanent substitutions:

- Stig Henriksson (V) resigned on 31 October 2017 and was replaced by Vasiliki Tsouplaki (V) on 1 November 2017.
- Lars Eriksson (S) resigned on 19 March 2018 and was replaced by Gabriel Wikström (S) on 20 March 2018.
- Gabriel Wikström (S) resigned on 21 March 2018 and was replaced by Åsa Eriksson (S) on 22 March 2018.

===== 2010 =====
Results of the 2010 general election held on 19 September 2010:

Party		Votes per municipality										Total votes	%	Seats		
Party		Arboga	Fagersta	Hallsta- hammar	Köping	Kungsör	Norberg	Sala	Skinns- katteberg	Sura- hammar	Västerås	Total votes	%	Con.	Lev.	Tot.
Swedish Social Democratic Party	S	3,218	3,374	4,325	6,369	1,840	1,582	4,716	1,336	3,026	28,436	58,222	36.36%	4	0	4
Moderate Party	M	2,259	1,611	1,881	3,648	1,420	747	3,706	512	1,196	26,482	43,462	27.14%	3	0	3
Liberal People's Party	FP	582	369	558	831	362	176	849	229	349	7,711	12,016	7.50%	1	0	1
Sweden Democrats	SD	512	587	521	1,087	370	274	896	198	432	5,115	9,992	6.24%	0	1	1
Green Party	MP	535	384	437	792	260	217	826	157	254	5,597	9,459	5.91%	0	1	1
Left Party	V	487	672	668	1,053	294	411	676	217	485	4,191	9,154	5.72%	0	1	1
Centre Party	C	496	258	321	998	358	172	1,589	189	171	3,714	8,266	5.16%	0	0	0
Christian Democrats	KD	387	281	395	608	249	108	689	86	177	4,426	7,406	4.62%	0	0	0
Pirate Party	PP	56	51	47	101	40	25	107	15	26	645	1,113	0.70%	0	0	0
Swedish Senior Citizen Interest Party	SPI	8	1	5	3	0	2	8	2	8	451	488	0.30%	0	0	0
Feminist Initiative	FI	10	8	12	34	8	13	14	1	8	191	299	0.19%	0	0	0
Rural Democrats		6	2	16	9	2	1	1	5	1	24	67	0.04%	0	0	0
Party of the Swedes	SVP	3	0	9	1	0	0	0	1	19	22	55	0.03%	0	0	0
National Democrats	ND	0	1	0	6	0	0	3	0	1	15	26	0.02%	0	0	0
Communist Party of Sweden	SKP	0	3	0	0	0	0	0	0	2	17	22	0.01%	0	0	0
Unity	ENH	0	0	1	2	0	1	1	0	1	16	22	0.01%	0	0	0
Classical Liberal Party	KLP	2	0	2	0	1	0	0	1	0	14	20	0.01%	0	0	0
Freedom Party		2	0	2	0	0	0	0	0	0	9	13	0.01%	0	0	0
Spirits Party		0	1	1	1	0	0	0	0	0	0	3	0.00%	0	0	0
Norrländska Coalition	NorrS	0	1	0	0	0	0	0	0	0	1	2	0.00%	0	0	0
European Workers Party	EAP	0	0	0	0	1	0	0	0	0	0	1	0.00%	0	0	0
Parties not on the ballot		2	1	2	3	1	0	3	1	3	19	35	0.02%	0	0	0
Valid votes		8,565	7,605	9,203	15,546	5,206	3,729	14,084	2,950	6,159	87,096	160,143	100.00%	8	3	11
Blank votes		131	130	130	162	82	67	207	22	98	912	1,941	1.20%			
Rejected votes – other		0	4	6	10	4	2	3	4	4	45	82	0.05%			
Total polled		8,696	7,739	9,339	15,718	5,292	3,798	14,294	2,976	6,261	88,053	162,166	84.35%			
Registered electors		10,407	9,422	11,336	19,025	6,243	4,514	16,960	3,527	7,498	103,326	192,258				
Turnout		83.56%	82.14%	82.38%	82.62%	84.77%	84.14%	84.28%	84.38%	83.50%	85.22%	84.35%				

The following candidates were elected:

- Constituency seats (personal mandates) - Roger Haddad (FP), 1,146 votes.
- Constituency seats (party mandates) - Staffan Anger (M), 1,015 votes; Åsa Coenraads (M), 441 votes; Pia Nilsson (S), 1,584 votes; Sven-Erik Österberg (S), 4,154 votes; Jessica Polfjärd (M), 2,473 votes; Olle Thorell (S), 799 votes; and Anna Wallén (S), 1,351 votes.
- Levelling seats (party mandates) - Agneta Luttropp (MP), 267 votes; Kent Persson (V), 431 votes; and Margareta Sandstedt (SD), 67 votes.

Permanent substitutions:

- Sven-Erik Österberg (S) resigned on 30 September 2012 and was replaced by Lars Eriksson (S) on 1 October 2012.

==== 2000s ====
===== 2006 =====
Results of the 2006 general election held on 17 September 2006:

Party		Votes per municipality										Total votes	%	Seats		
Party		Arboga	Fagersta	Hallsta- hammar	Köping	Kungsör	Norberg	Sala	Skinns- katteberg	Sura- hammar	Västerås	Total votes	%	Con.	Lev.	Tot.
Swedish Social Democratic Party	S	3,453	3,611	4,213	6,572	1,924	1,562	4,650	1,347	3,056	28,626	59,014	39.79%	4	0	4
Moderate Party	M	1,733	1,291	1,375	2,897	1,161	573	3,011	399	813	21,280	34,533	23.29%	2	0	2
Liberal People's Party	FP	542	372	507	813	302	158	824	157	335	8,066	12,076	8.14%	1	0	1
Centre Party	C	725	322	458	1,254	539	233	1,872	256	271	4,256	10,186	6.87%	1	0	1
Left Party	V	525	683	648	966	287	442	745	254	475	4,186	9,211	6.21%	0	1	1
Christian Democrats	KD	423	334	620	728	280	117	854	106	238	4,802	8,502	5.73%	0	0	0
Green Party	MP	316	220	316	486	183	147	463	95	175	3,907	6,308	4.25%	0	0	0
Sweden Democrats	SD	201	165	243	490	157	107	355	82	142	1,775	3,717	2.51%	0	0	0
Swedish Senior Citizen Interest Party	SPI	14	16	53	43	4	19	30	18	38	1,044	1,279	0.86%	0	0	0
Pirate Party	PP	90	48	58	93	32	31	98	11	38	591	1,090	0.74%	0	0	0
June List		107	36	56	91	49	22	85	11	52	395	904	0.61%	0	0	0
Feminist Initiative	FI	38	25	15	58	22	31	25	21	9	347	591	0.40%	0	0	0
National Democrats	ND	8	55	12	26	7	11	48	7	6	259	439	0.30%	0	0	0
Health Care Party	Sjvåp	6	50	5	14	10	48	22	3	12	48	218	0.15%	0	0	0
National Socialist Front		19	1	1	7	3	2	0	0	0	25	58	0.04%	0	0	0
The Communists	KOMM	1	0	1	0	0	0	3	0	0	39	44	0.03%	0	0	0
Unity	ENH	0	1	1	4	2	0	7	3	2	16	36	0.02%	0	0	0
New Future	NYF	4	1	2	5	0	3	1	2	0	11	29	0.02%	0	0	0
People's Will		0	1	0	2	1	0	2	0	0	3	9	0.01%	0	0	0
Socialist Justice Party	RS	0	1	0	2	0	0	0	0	0	3	6	0.00%	0	0	0
Freedom of the Justice Party	S-FRP	0	0	2	0	0	0	0	0	0	3	5	0.00%	0	0	0
Unique Party		0	0	0	1	0	0	2	0	0	1	4	0.00%	0	0	0
Active Democracy		2	0	0	0	0	0	0	0	0	1	3	0.00%	0	0	0
Classical Liberal Party	KLP	0	0	0	0	0	0	0	0	0	3	3	0.00%	0	0	0
Democratic Party of New Swedes	DPNS	0	0	0	0	0	0	0	0	0	1	1	0.00%	0	0	0
European Workers Party	EAP	0	0	0	0	0	0	0	0	1	0	1	0.00%	0	0	0
Kvinnokraft		0	0	0	0	0	1	0	0	0	0	1	0.00%	0	0	0
Partiet.se		0	0	0	1	0	0	0	0	0	0	1	0.00%	0	0	0
Other parties		0	4	2	3	0	0	3	1	1	16	30	0.02%	0	0	0
Valid votes		8,207	7,237	8,588	14,556	4,963	3,507	13,100	2,773	5,664	79,704	148,299	100.00%	8	1	9
Blank votes		166	136	198	324	92	90	314	44	118	1,822	3,304	2.18%			
Rejected votes – other		0	2	0	7	2	0	7	1	0	30	49	0.03%			
Total polled		8,373	7,375	8,786	14,887	5,057	3,597	13,421	2,818	5,782	81,556	151,652	80.75%			
Registered electors		10,340	9,417	11,076	18,870	6,234	4,519	16,577	3,554	7,385	99,834	187,806				
Turnout		80.98%	78.32%	79.32%	78.89%	81.12%	79.60%	80.96%	79.29%	78.29%	81.69%	80.75%				

The following candidates were elected:

- Constituency seats (party mandates) - Staffan Anger (M), 953 votes; Agneta Berliner (FP), 672 votes; Margareta Israelsson (S), 1,234 votes; Jörgen Johansson (C), 789 votes; Pia Nilsson (S), 1,252 votes; Sven-Erik Österberg (S), 2,878 votes; Jessica Polfjärd (M), 1,890 votes; and Olle Thorell (S), 580 votes.
- Levelling seats (party mandates) - Kent Persson (V), 454 votes.

Permanent substitutions:

- Jörgen Johansson (C) died on 13 June 2010 and was replaced by Christer Eriksson (C) on 14 June 2010.

===== 2002 =====
Results of the 2002 general election held on 15 September 2002:

Party		Votes per municipality											Total votes	%	Seats		
Party		Arboga	Fagersta	Hallsta- hammar	Heby	Köping	Kungsör	Norberg	Sala	Skinns- katteberg	Sura- hammar	Västerås	Total votes	%	Con.	Lev.	Tot.
Swedish Social Democratic Party	S	3,622	3,838	4,361	3,174	6,853	2,184	1,730	5,143	1,450	3,241	31,557	67,153	44.97%	5	0	5
Liberal People's Party	FP	1,006	581	817	659	1,442	562	281	1,427	185	487	12,408	19,855	13.30%	1	0	1
Moderate Party	M	953	747	696	749	1,546	586	311	1,484	210	404	10,802	18,488	12.38%	1	0	1
Left Party	V	723	997	886	655	1,395	398	601	928	348	646	5,433	13,010	8.71%	1	0	1
Christian Democrats	KD	683	441	696	825	959	409	175	1,212	143	312	6,102	11,957	8.01%	1	0	1
Centre Party	C	564	286	361	1,326	979	428	189	1,612	225	214	2,354	8,538	5.72%	0	1	1
Green Party	MP	429	261	277	274	457	173	145	544	105	197	3,642	6,504	4.36%	0	0	0
Sweden Democrats	SD	80	75	162	107	127	26	15	149	15	52	882	1,690	1.13%	0	0	0
Swedish Senior Citizen Interest Party	SPI	29	19	42	13	46	6	19	73	4	18	796	1,065	0.71%	0	0	0
National Democrats	ND	8	36	13	6	71	18	12	13	7	8	188	380	0.25%	0	0	0
New Future	NYF	49	0	5	33	42	20	0	5	0	3	26	183	0.12%	0	0	0
The Communists	KOMM	0	9	17	0	0	0	1	1	0	3	130	161	0.11%	0	0	0
Socialist Party	SOC.P	11	1	0	1	104	4	1	0	1	1	2	126	0.08%	0	0	0
Norrbotten Party	NBP	0	0	1	2	0	0	0	0	0	4	19	26	0.02%	0	0	0
Unity	ENH	2	0	2	0	0	1	0	0	0	0	2	7	0.00%	0	0	0
Socialist Justice Party	RS	0	1	0	0	0	0	0	0	0	0	0	1	0.00%	0	0	0
Other parties		10	9	9	9	25	5	9	9	11	14	67	177	0.12%	0	0	0
Valid votes		8,169	7,301	8,345	7,833	14,046	4,820	3,489	12,600	2,704	5,604	74,410	149,321	100.00%	9	1	10
Rejected votes		170	94	108	187	257	102	55	263	32	100	1,237	2,605	1.71%			
Total polled		8,339	7,395	8,453	8,020	14,303	4,922	3,544	12,863	2,736	5,704	75,647	151,926	78.45%			
Registered electors		10,448	9,503	10,966	10,189	18,502	6,137	4,500	16,426	3,532	7,332	96,130	193,665				
Turnout		79.81%	77.82%	77.08%	78.71%	77.31%	80.20%	78.76%	78.31%	77.46%	77.80%	78.69%	78.45%				

The following candidates were elected:

- Constituency seats (party mandates) - Kerstin Heinemann (FP), 1,226 votes; Stig Henriksson (V), 858 votes; Tomas Högström (M), 1,404 votes; Margareta Israelsson (S), 1,567 votes; Torsten Lindström (KD), 619 votes; Göran Magnusson (S), 977 votes; Sven-Erik Österberg (S), 2,539 votes; Paavo Vallius (S), 601 votes; and Mariann Ytterberg (S), 1,301 votes.
- Levelling seats (party mandates) - Jörgen Johansson (C), 626 votes.

Permanent substitutions:

- Stig Henriksson (V) resigned on 30 September 2002 and was replaced by Karin Thorborg (V) on 1 October 2002.

==== 1990s ====
===== 1998 =====
Results of the 1998 general election held on 20 September 1998:

Party		Votes per municipality											Total votes	%	Seats		
Party		Arboga	Fagersta	Hallsta- hammar	Heby	Köping	Kungsör	Norberg	Sala	Skinns- katteberg	Sura- hammar	Västerås	Total votes	%	Con.	Lev.	Tot.
Swedish Social Democratic Party	S	3,602	3,706	4,349	3,001	6,431	1,943	1,594	4,633	1,388	3,075	28,119	61,841	41.06%	5	0	5
Moderate Party	M	1,535	1,201	1,220	1,262	2,327	928	513	2,442	333	701	17,440	29,902	19.85%	2	0	2
Left Party	V	1,161	1,462	1,416	990	2,356	667	946	1,434	510	1,080	8,030	20,052	13.31%	1	0	1
Christian Democrats	KD	917	601	728	982	1,398	521	224	1,659	235	446	8,549	16,260	10.80%	1	0	1
Centre Party	C	444	208	322	1,166	820	352	183	1,361	195	158	1,834	7,043	4.68%	0	0	0
Liberal People's Party	FP	349	238	292	211	464	190	103	490	60	206	4,188	6,791	4.51%	0	1	1
Green Party	MP	510	243	319	321	514	216	149	689	123	212	3,251	6,547	4.35%	0	0	0
Other parties		71	81	99	95	265	75	44	145	32	71	1,195	2,173	1.44%	0	0	0
Valid votes		8,589	7,740	8,745	8,028	14,575	4,892	3,756	12,853	2,876	5,949	72,606	150,609	100.00%	9	1	10
Rejected votes		206	126	189	244	309	114	93	401	31	146	1,823	3,682	2.39%			
Total polled		8,795	7,866	8,934	8,272	14,884	5,006	3,849	13,254	2,907	6,095	74,429	154,291	80.41%			
Registered electors		10,731	9,857	11,238	10,056	18,776	6,112	4,662	16,479	3,584	7,590	92,807	191,892				
Turnout		81.96%	79.80%	79.50%	82.26%	79.27%	81.90%	82.56%	80.43%	81.11%	80.30%	80.20%	80.41%				

The following candidates were elected:

- Constituency seats (personal mandates) - Lena Hjelm-Wallén (S), 6,146 votes.
- Constituency seats (party mandates) - Karin Falkmer (M), 1,558 votes; Tomas Högström (M), 2,015 votes; Margareta Israelsson (S), 600 votes; Magnus Jacobsson (KD), 3 votes; Tanja Linderborg (V), 1,318 votes; Göran Magnusson (S), 662 votes; Sven-Erik Österberg (S), 814 votes; and Mariann Ytterberg (S), 582 votes.
- Levelling seats (personal mandates) - Kerstin Heinemann (FP), 709 votes.

===== 1994 =====
Results of the 1994 general election held on 18 September 1994:

Party		Votes per municipality											Total votes	%	Seats		
Party		Arboga	Fagersta	Hallsta- hammar	Heby	Köping	Kungsör	Norberg	Sala	Skinns- katteberg	Sura- hammar	Västerås	Total votes	%	Con.	Lev.	Tot.
Swedish Social Democratic Party	S	4,842	5,285	6,094	3,986	8,840	2,634	2,355	6,180	1,934	4,225	37,819	84,194	51.24%	6	0	6
Moderate Party	M	1,660	1,237	1,251	1,261	2,510	980	525	2,581	356	732	18,067	31,160	18.96%	2	0	2
Liberal People's Party	FP	623	465	510	361	827	324	170	870	115	341	7,231	11,837	7.20%	1	0	1
Left Party	V	635	623	841	460	1,384	387	510	665	251	633	3,972	10,361	6.31%	0	1	1
Centre Party	C	676	346	425	1,606	1,174	476	253	2,046	248	214	2,474	9,938	6.05%	0	1	1
Green Party	MP	542	312	324	465	636	292	187	906	162	274	3,559	7,659	4.66%	0	0	0
Christian Democratic Unity	KDS	334	196	227	402	566	148	90	580	98	146	2,707	5,494	3.34%	0	0	0
New Democracy	NyD	93	94	130	87	149	76	36	156	15	93	1,043	1,972	1.20%	0	0	0
Other parties		105	113	136	25	242	60	31	140	31	80	728	1,691	1.03%	0	0	0
Valid votes		9,510	8,671	9,938	8,653	16,328	5,377	4,157	14,124	3,210	6,738	77,600	164,306	100.00%	9	2	11
Rejected votes		173	101	131	143	194	91	66	319	30	78	1,115	2,441	1.46%			
Total polled		9,683	8,772	10,069	8,796	16,522	5,468	4,223	14,443	3,240	6,816	78,715	166,747	86.51%			
Registered electors		11,132	10,189	11,644	10,221	19,220	6,264	4,822	16,745	3,717	7,784	91,018	192,756				
Turnout		86.98%	86.09%	86.47%	86.06%	85.96%	87.29%	87.58%	86.25%	87.17%	87.56%	86.48%	86.51%				

The following candidates were elected: Karin Falkmer (M); Kerstin Heinemann (FP); Lena Hjelm-Wallén (S); Tomas Högström (M); Margareta Israelsson (S); Tanja Linderborg (V); Göran Magnusson (S); Sven-Erik Österberg (S); Berit Oscarsson (S); Paavo Vallius (S); and Marie Wilén (C).

===== 1991 =====
Results of the 1991 general election held on 15 September 1991:

Party		Votes per municipality											Total votes	%	Seats		
Party		Arboga	Fagersta	Hallsta- hammar	Heby	Köping	Kungsör	Norberg	Sala	Skinns- katteberg	Sura- hammar	Västerås	Total votes	%	Con.	Lev.	Tot.
Swedish Social Democratic Party	S	4,303	4,950	5,594	3,230	7,841	2,322	2,223	4,959	1,702	3,880	30,606	71,610	44.08%	5	0	5
Moderate Party	M	1,636	1,184	1,256	1,045	2,372	902	495	2,268	367	713	16,538	28,776	17.71%	2	0	2
Liberal People's Party	FP	835	602	760	446	1,213	529	227	1,203	181	430	9,308	15,734	9.69%	1	0	1
New Democracy	NyD	507	561	790	738	951	377	241	1,428	199	473	5,956	12,221	7.52%	1	0	1
Centre Party	C	801	388	459	1,703	1,307	508	287	2,103	278	246	3,055	11,135	6.85%	0	1	1
Christian Democratic Unity	KDS	635	460	475	749	1,087	295	149	1,174	163	309	4,903	10,399	6.40%	0	1	1
Left Party	V	396	428	573	314	896	231	387	479	220	414	2,837	7,175	4.42%	0	0	0
Green Party	MP	331	185	183	206	436	197	140	426	93	154	2,179	4,530	2.79%	0	0	0
Other parties		55	79	87	18	61	9	28	38	15	39	442	871	0.54%	0	0	0
Valid votes		9,499	8,837	10,177	8,449	16,164	5,370	4,177	14,078	3,218	6,658	75,824	162,451	100.00%	9	2	11
Rejected votes		186	124	169	153	240	90	77	301	45	80	1,279	2,744	1.66%			
Total polled		9,685	8,961	10,346	8,602	16,404	5,460	4,254	14,379	3,263	6,738	77,103	165,195	85.94%			
Registered electors		11,220	10,416	11,979	10,077	19,311	6,258	4,910	16,578	3,771	7,807	89,893	192,220				
Turnout		86.32%	86.03%	86.37%	85.36%	84.95%	87.25%	86.64%	86.74%	86.53%	86.31%	85.77%	85.94%				

The following candidates were elected: Birger Andersson (C); Hugo Bergdahl (FP); Karin Falkmer (M); Birgit Henriksson (M); Lena Hjelm-Wallén (S); Margareta Israelsson (S); Göran Magnusson (S); Max Montalvo (NyD); Berit Oscarsson (S); Carl Olov Persson (KDS); and Roland Sundgren (S).

==== 1980s ====
===== 1988 =====
Results of the 1988 general election held on 18 September 1988:

Party		Votes per municipality											Total votes	%	Seats		
Party		Arboga	Fagersta	Hallsta- hammar	Heby	Köping	Kungsör	Norberg	Sala	Skinns- katteberg	Sura- hammar	Västerås	Total votes	%	Con.	Lev.	Tot.
Swedish Social Democratic Party	S	4,689	5,531	6,059	3,603	8,477	2,543	2,404	5,619	1,929	4,240	34,535	79,629	50.16%	5	0	5
Moderate Party	M	1,319	946	1,081	759	1,742	643	414	1,835	272	523	12,769	22,303	14.05%	2	0	2
Liberal People's Party	FP	981	770	956	664	1,593	635	281	1,638	184	569	11,904	20,175	12.71%	1	0	1
Centre Party	C	1,040	571	687	2,199	1,730	681	345	2,732	353	340	4,601	15,279	9.62%	1	0	1
Left Party – Communists	VPK	504	536	820	445	1,112	301	415	632	217	534	3,715	9,231	5.81%	0	1	1
Green Party	MP	460	365	317	315	781	310	194	688	146	243	3,330	7,149	4.50%	0	0	0
Christian Democratic Unity	KDS	230	100	164	266	416	98	43	393	44	126	1,709	3,589	2.26%	0	0	0
Other parties		98	120	147	24	305	36	46	24	16	26	551	1,393	0.88%	0	0	0
Valid votes		9,321	8,939	10,231	8,275	16,156	5,247	4,142	13,561	3,161	6,601	73,114	158,748	100.00%	9	1	10
Rejected votes		120	94	107	135	188	64	66	268	30	70	1,056	2,198	1.37%			
Total polled		9,441	9,033	10,338	8,410	16,344	5,311	4,208	13,829	3,191	6,671	74,170	160,946	84.98%			
Registered electors		11,043	10,473	12,064	9,875	19,360	6,070	4,819	16,219	3,753	7,711	87,998	189,385				
Turnout		85.49%	86.25%	85.69%	85.16%	84.42%	87.50%	87.32%	85.26%	85.03%	86.51%	84.29%	84.98%				

The following candidates were elected: Anders Andersson (M); Birger Andersson (C); Hugo Bergdahl (FP); Karin Falkmer (M); Margareta Hemmingsson (S); Lena Hjelm-Wallén (S); Göran Magnusson (S); Berit Oscarsson (S); Hans Petersson (VPK); and Roland Sundgren (S).

Permanent substitutions:

- Anders Andersson (M) died on 8 May 1989 and was replaced by Birgit Henriksson (M) on 10 May 1989.
- Hans Petersson (VPK) resigned on 2 October 1989 and was replaced by Jan-Olof Ragnarsson (VPK) on 3 October 1989.

===== 1985 =====
Results of the 1985 general election held on 15 September 1985:

Party		Votes per municipality											Total votes	%	Seats		
Party		Arboga	Fagersta	Hallsta- hammar	Heby	Köping	Kungsör	Norberg	Sala	Skinns- katteberg	Sura- hammar	Västerås	Total votes	%	Con.	Lev.	Tot.
Swedish Social Democratic Party	S	5,241	6,032	6,539	3,823	9,359	2,712	2,626	5,860	2,103	4,507	37,694	86,496	51.70%	5	1	6
Moderate Party	M	1,595	1,242	1,430	1,075	2,202	899	512	2,479	360	692	16,029	28,515	17.04%	2	0	2
Liberal People's Party	FP	1,206	916	1,092	880	1,785	722	344	2,021	264	676	13,241	23,147	13.84%	1	0	1
Centre Party	C	1,199	620	793	2,449	2,088	730	416	3,031	410	455	5,289	17,480	10.45%	1	0	1
Left Party – Communists	VPK	431	574	793	396	1,021	273	430	546	225	474	3,684	8,847	5.29%	0	1	1
Green Party	MP	172	90	100	88	201	121	47	286	36	71	953	2,165	1.29%	0	0	0
Other parties		15	19	17	15	330	17	7	15	8	9	195	647	0.39%	0	0	0
Valid votes		9,859	9,493	10,764	8,726	16,986	5,474	4,382	14,238	3,406	6,884	77,085	167,297	100.00%	9	2	11
Rejected votes		78	90	68	107	148	41	49	187	20	66	790	1,644	0.97%			
Total polled		9,937	9,583	10,832	8,833	17,134	5,515	4,431	14,425	3,426	6,950	77,875	168,941	89.73%			
Registered electors		11,029	10,587	12,038	9,856	19,313	6,063	4,890	16,046	3,782	7,590	87,081	188,275				
Turnout		90.10%	90.52%	89.98%	89.62%	88.72%	90.96%	90.61%	89.90%	90.59%	91.57%	89.43%	89.73%				

The following candidates were elected: Tage Adolfsson (M); Hugo Bergdahl (FP); Karl Björzén (M); Olle Göransson (S); Kerstin Göthberg (C); Margareta Hemmingsson (S); Lena Hjelm-Wallén (S); Göran Magnusson (S); Berit Oscarsson (S); Hans Petersson (VPK); and Roland Sundgren (S).

Permanent substitutions:

- Karl Björzén (M) died on 9 June 1987 and was replaced by Karin Falkmer (M) on 10 June 1987.

===== 1982 =====
Results of the 1982 general election held on 19 September 1982:

Party		Votes per municipality											Total votes	%	Seats		
Party		Arboga	Fagersta	Hallsta- hammar	Heby	Köping	Kungsör	Norberg	Sala	Skinns- katteberg	Sura- hammar	Västerås	Total votes	%	Con.	Lev.	Tot.
Swedish Social Democratic Party	S	5,381	6,385	6,832	4,009	9,736	2,784	2,809	5,912	2,092	4,705	37,782	88,427	52.64%	6	0	6
Moderate Party	M	1,762	1,476	1,569	1,205	2,496	973	533	2,728	357	761	18,665	32,525	19.36%	2	0	2
Centre Party	C	1,529	930	1,051	2,702	2,592	942	506	3,588	489	584	7,682	22,595	13.45%	1	0	1
Liberal People's Party	FP	581	394	488	386	809	385	142	874	87	276	5,416	9,838	5.86%	0	1	1
Left Party – Communists	VPK	431	506	751	435	999	294	383	583	226	432	4,245	9,285	5.53%	0	1	1
Christian Democratic Unity	KDS	186	86	157	149	326	73	52	267	37	87	1,167	2,587	1.54%	0	0	0
Green Party	MP	133	131	93	97	200	101	56	249	61	62	1,154	2,337	1.39%	0	0	0
K-Party	K-P	7	55	24	2	23	0	7	3	3	0	67	191	0.11%	0	0	0
Other parties		9	10	11	6	36	3	3	22	5	6	99	210	0.13%	0	0	0
Valid votes		10,019	9,973	10,976	8,991	17,217	5,555	4,491	14,226	3,357	6,913	76,277	167,995	100.00%	9	2	11
Rejected votes		80	105	89	86	148	47	56	155	24	55	808	1,653	0.97%			
Total polled		10,099	10,078	11,065	9,077	17,365	5,602	4,547	14,381	3,381	6,968	77,085	169,648	91.63%			
Registered electors		11,004	10,866	12,012	9,970	18,959	5,979	4,985	15,768	3,660	7,420	84,522	185,145				
Turnout		91.78%	92.75%	92.12%	91.04%	91.59%	93.69%	91.21%	91.20%	92.38%	93.91%	91.20%	91.63%				

The following candidates were elected: Tage Adolfsson (M); Hugo Bergdahl (FP); Karl Björzén (M); Olle Göransson (S); Kerstin Göthberg (C); Lena Hjelm-Wallén (S); Thure Jadestig (S); Karl-Gustaf Mathsson (S); Berit Oscarsson (S); Hans Petersson (VPK); and Roland Sundgren (S).

Permanent substitutions:

- Tage Adolfsson (M) resigned on 7 March 1983 and was replaced by Eva Bergqvist (M) on 8 March 1983.
- Eva Bergqvist (M) resigned on 8 March 1983 and was replaced by Anders Andersson (M) on the same day.
- Karl-Gustaf Mathsson (S) resigned on 1 October 1984 and was replaced by Margareta Hemmingsson (S) on 2 October 1984.

==== 1970s ====
===== 1979 =====
Results of the 1979 general election held on 16 September 1979:

Party		Votes per municipality											Total votes	%	Seats		
Party		Arboga	Fagersta	Hallsta- hammar	Heby	Köping	Kungsör	Norberg	Sala	Skinns- katteberg	Sura- hammar	Västerås	Total votes	%	Con.	Lev.	Tot.
Swedish Social Democratic Party	S	5,021	6,177	6,558	3,793	9,122	2,665	2,744	5,569	2,003	4,368	34,791	82,811	50.48%	5	0	5
Moderate Party	M	1,500	1,148	1,264	846	2,018	786	489	2,077	292	625	15,356	26,401	16.09%	2	0	2
Centre Party	C	1,685	1,110	1,232	2,988	2,950	1,060	602	4,165	565	705	8,344	25,406	15.49%	1	1	2
Liberal People's Party	FP	1,056	834	967	649	1,393	594	221	1,380	189	514	9,825	17,622	10.74%	1	0	1
Left Party – Communists	VPK	414	391	632	361	934	256	333	551	178	391	3,970	8,411	5.13%	0	1	1
Christian Democratic Unity	KDS	119	70	103	99	275	64	56	218	32	48	657	1,741	1.06%	0	0	0
Workers' Party – The Communists	APK	26	90	53	2	22	0	29	0	8	44	86	360	0.22%	0	0	0
Communist Party of Sweden	SKP	16	13	7	4	34	3	7	9	6	6	232	337	0.21%	0	0	0
Other parties		16	31	46	16	63	13	27	57	10	38	650	967	0.59%	0	0	0
Valid votes		9,853	9,864	10,862	8,758	16,811	5,441	4,508	14,026	3,283	6,739	73,911	164,056	100.00%	9	2	11
Rejected votes		50	48	54	47	103	40	30	104	26	30	454	986	0.60%			
Total polled		9,903	9,912	10,916	8,805	16,914	5,481	4,538	14,130	3,309	6,769	74,365	165,042	90.74%			
Registered electors		10,878	10,744	11,940	9,763	18,741	5,902	4,958	15,485	3,641	7,234	82,593	181,879				
Turnout		91.04%	92.26%	91.42%	90.19%	90.25%	92.87%	91.53%	91.25%	90.88%	93.57%	90.04%	90.74%				

The following candidates were elected: Tage Adolfsson (M); Karl Björzén (M); Eric Enlund (FP); Anders Gernandt (C); Olle Göransson (S); Kerstin Göthberg (C); Lena Hjelm-Wallén (S); Thure Jadestig (S); Karl-Gustaf Mathsson (S); Hans Petersson (VPK); and Roland Sundgren (S).

===== 1976 =====
Results of the 1976 general election held on 19 September 1976:

Party		Votes per municipality											Total votes	%	Seats		
Party		Arboga	Fagersta	Hallsta- hammar	Heby	Köping	Kungsör	Norberg	Sala	Skinns- katteberg	Sura- hammar	Västerås	Total votes	%	Con.	Lev.	Tot.
Swedish Social Democratic Party	S	4,887	6,198	6,442	3,690	9,051	2,508	2,708	5,543	2,057	4,180	34,981	82,245	50.27%	5	0	5
Centre Party	C	2,314	1,564	1,791	3,360	3,915	1,377	829	4,876	703	903	12,729	34,361	21.00%	2	0	2
Moderate Party	M	1,114	850	959	581	1,494	485	352	1,528	215	421	10,937	18,936	11.57%	1	0	1
People's Party	F	1,020	825	921	671	1,384	652	244	1,458	163	449	10,524	18,311	11.19%	1	0	1
Left Party – Communists	VPK	332	464	565	337	676	233	260	377	154	386	3,326	7,110	4.35%	0	0	0
Christian Democratic Unity	KDS	107	64	129	109	306	54	35	186	43	51	860	1,944	1.19%	0	0	0
Communist Party of Sweden	SKP	13	27	27	14	64	14	9	24	12	20	307	531	0.32%	0	0	0
Other parties		2	2	18	0	23	2	1	4	0	11	107	170	0.10%	0	0	0
Valid votes		9,789	9,994	10,852	8,762	16,913	5,325	4,438	13,996	3,347	6,421	73,771	163,608	100.00%	9	0	9
Rejected votes		36	34	27	25	69	21	15	51	4	16	309	607	0.37%			
Total polled		9,825	10,028	10,879	8,787	16,982	5,346	4,453	14,047	3,351	6,437	74,080	164,215	91.69%			
Registered electors		10,573	10,816	11,787	9,710	18,522	5,736	4,827	15,180	3,627	6,819	81,494	179,091				
Turnout		92.93%	92.71%	92.30%	90.49%	91.69%	93.20%	92.25%	92.54%	92.39%	94.40%	90.90%	91.69%				

The following candidates were elected: Tage Adolfsson (M); Eric Enlund (F); Anton E. Fågelsbo (C); Olle Göransson (S); Kerstin Göthberg (C); Lena Hjelm-Wallén (S); Thure Jadestig (S); Eric Marcusson (S); and Roland Sundgren (S).

===== 1973 =====
Results of the 1973 general election held on 16 September 1973:

Party		Votes per municipality											Total votes	%	Seats		
Party		Arboga	Fagersta	Hallsta- hammar	Heby	Köping	Kungsör	Norberg	Sala	Skinns- katteberg	Sura- hammar	Västerås	Total votes	%	Con.	Lev.	Tot.
Swedish Social Democratic Party	S	4,810	6,027	6,250	3,534	8,711	2,449	2,654	5,271	1,984	3,976	33,299	78,965	50.81%	5	1	6
Centre Party	C	2,319	1,618	1,873	3,255	3,791	1,228	760	4,805	639	919	14,892	36,099	23.23%	2	1	3
Moderate Party	M	980	791	752	438	1,175	391	287	1,284	197	318	8,473	15,086	9.71%	1	0	1
People's Party	F	866	719	718	587	1,076	518	192	1,156	144	303	7,781	14,060	9.05%	1	0	1
Left Party – Communists	VPK	404	527	703	394	857	274	278	404	166	463	3,643	8,113	5.22%	0	1	1
Christian Democratic Unity	KDS	91	78	118	110	362	55	57	155	46	78	1,066	2,216	1.43%	0	0	0
Communist Party of Sweden	SKP	15	46	40	43	94	10	16	48	25	20	323	680	0.44%	0	0	0
Communist League Marxist–Leninists (the revolutionaries)	KFML(r)	0	6	4	2	14	4	1	4	0	1	120	156	0.10%	0	0	0
Other parties		1	0	1	3	11	2	0	2	0	2	21	43	0.03%	0	0	0
Valid votes		9,486	9,812	10,459	8,366	16,091	4,931	4,245	13,129	3,201	6,080	69,618	155,418	100.00%	9	3	12
Rejected votes		27	18	21	12	40	5	7	27	2	9	156	324	0.21%			
Total polled		9,513	9,830	10,480	8,378	16,131	4,936	4,252	13,156	3,203	6,089	69,774	155,742	90.77%			
Registered electors		10,377	10,649	11,396	9,367	17,810	5,329	4,642	14,411	3,495	6,480	77,627	171,583				
Turnout		91.67%	92.31%	91.96%	89.44%	90.57%	92.63%	91.60%	91.29%	91.65%	93.97%	89.88%	90.77%				

The following candidates were elected: Tage Adolfsson (M); Eric Enlund (F); Anton E. Fågelsbo (C); Anders Gernandt (C); Olle Göransson (S); Kerstin Göthberg (C); Sven Hammarberg (S); Lena Hjelm-Wallén (S); Thure Jadestig (S); Eric Marcusson (S); Rune Pettersson (VPK); and Roland Sundgren (S).

===== 1970 =====
Results of the 1970 general election held on 20 September 1970:

Party		Votes per municipality												Total votes	%	Seats		
Party		Arboga	Fagersta	Hallsta- hammar	Heby	Köping	Kungsör	Norberg	Sala	Skinns- katteberg	Sura- hammar	Västerås	Postal votes	Total votes	%	Con.	Lev.	Tot.
Swedish Social Democratic Party	S	4,278	5,467	5,779	3,408	8,103	2,317	2,377	4,492	1,869	3,598	29,313	8,522	79,523	53.52%	5	1	6
Centre Party	C	1,275	895	1,161	2,791	2,596	924	551	3,841	477	582	8,515	2,832	26,440	17.79%	2	0	2
People's Party	F	948	918	901	749	1,415	605	245	1,448	224	406	9,963	4,222	22,044	14.84%	1	1	2
Moderate Party	M	450	371	476	378	696	243	204	858	131	179	3,947	2,863	10,796	7.27%	1	0	1
Left Party – Communists	VPK	287	443	586	324	584	213	203	237	158	406	2,906	750	7,097	4.78%	0	0	0
Christian Democratic Unity	KDS	83	74	117	109	278	43	56	109	34	47	745	367	2,062	1.39%	0	0	0
Communist League Marxists-Leninists	KFML	13	16	26	19	124	1	16	87	2	18	134	161	617	0.42%	0	0	0
Other parties		0	0	0	0	1	0	0	0	0	0	3	4	8	0.01%	0	0	0
Valid votes		7,334	8,184	9,046	7,778	13,797	4,346	3,652	11,072	2,895	5,236	55,526	19,721	148,587	100.00%	9	2	11
Rejected votes		16	12	16	9	9	6	3	16	2	7	68	88	252	0.17%			
Total polled exc. postal votes		7,350	8,196	9,062	7,787	13,806	4,352	3,655	11,088	2,897	5,243	55,594	19,809	148,839				
Postal votes		1,069	1,560	1,153	670	2,421	593	546	1,429	326	703	9,300	-19,809	-39				
Total polled inc. postal votes		8,419	9,756	10,215	8,457	16,227	4,945	4,201	12,517	3,223	5,946	64,894	0	148,800	87.87%			
Registered electors		9,449	10,883	11,323	9,705	18,465	5,424	4,735	14,253	3,559	6,466	75,071		169,333				
Turnout		89.10%	89.64%	90.21%	87.14%	87.88%	91.17%	88.72%	87.82%	90.56%	91.96%	86.44%		87.87%				

The following candidates were elected: Tage Adolfsson (M); Eric Enlund (F); Carl-Gustav Enskog (F); Anton E. Fågelsbo (C); Anders Gernandt (C); Olle Göransson (S); Sven Hammarberg (S); Lena Hjelm-Wallén (S); Thure Jadestig (S); Eric Marcusson (S); and Roland Sundgren (S).
