= Högström =

Högström is a surname. Notable people with the surname include:

- Caroline Högström (born 1991), Swedish politician
- Elisabeth Högström (born 1951), Swedish curler
- Georg Högström (1895–1976), Swedish pole vaulter
- Leif Högström (born 1955), Swedish fencer
- Lotta Högström (born 1962), Swedish politician
- Marcus Högström (born 1989), Swedish ice hockey player
- Tomas Högström (born 1954), Swedish politician
- Torvald Högström (1926-2010), Finnish cyclist

== See also ==
- Hagström
