= Stig Henriksson =

Swedish politician (born 1955)

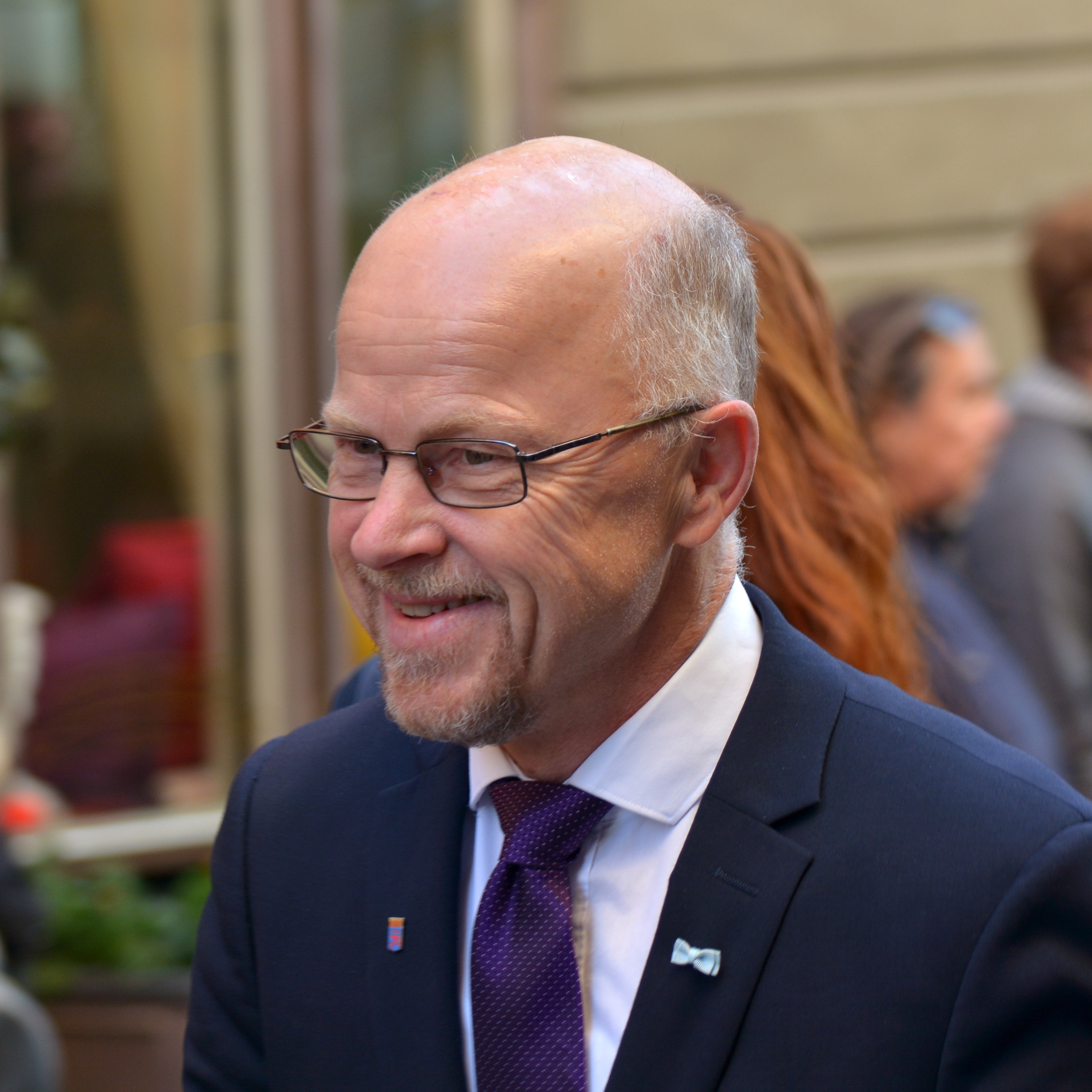
- Henriksson in September 2014

Member of the Riksdag
- In office 29 September 2014 – 31 October 2017
- Succeeded by: Vasiliki Tsouplaki
- Constituency: Västmanland County
- In office 30 September 2002 – 30 September 2002
- Succeeded by: Karin Thorborg
- Constituency: Västmanland County

Personal details
- Born: Stig-Göran Henriksson; 1955 (age 70–71)
- Party: Left Party

Stig-Göran Henriksson (born 1955) is a Swedish politician and former member of the Riksdag, the national legislature. A member of the Left Party, he represented Västmanland County in September 2002 and between September 2014 and October 2017.

Henriksson is the son of merchant Evert Henriksson and Elsa Henriksson (née Wennström). He was educated in Satter, Yrttivaara, Hakkas, Gällivare and Malmberget. He studied philosophy at Uppsala University and physiotherapy in Uppsala. He worked at Fagersta hospital between 1980 and 1982 and between 1983 and 2010. He worked for Mitt Hjärta AB between 2010 and 2016. He was a member of the municipal council in Fagersta Municipality from 1982 to 2019. He left the Riksdag in 2017 after he was refused leave to care for his stepchildren while his wife was working abroad. He retired from politics in 2019 and moved to Stockholm to be closer to his children and grandchildren.
