= Åsa Eriksson =

Åsa Eriksson may refer to:

- Åsa Mogensen née Eriksson, Swedish handball player
- Åsa Eriksson (politician), Swedish politician and former curler
