= Pia Nilsson =

Pia Nilsson may refer to:

- Pia Nilsson (golfer) (born 1958), Swedish professional golfer and coach
- Pia Nilsson (politician) (born 1962), Swedish social democratic politician
