= Åsa Eriksson (politician) =

Swedish politician (born 1972)

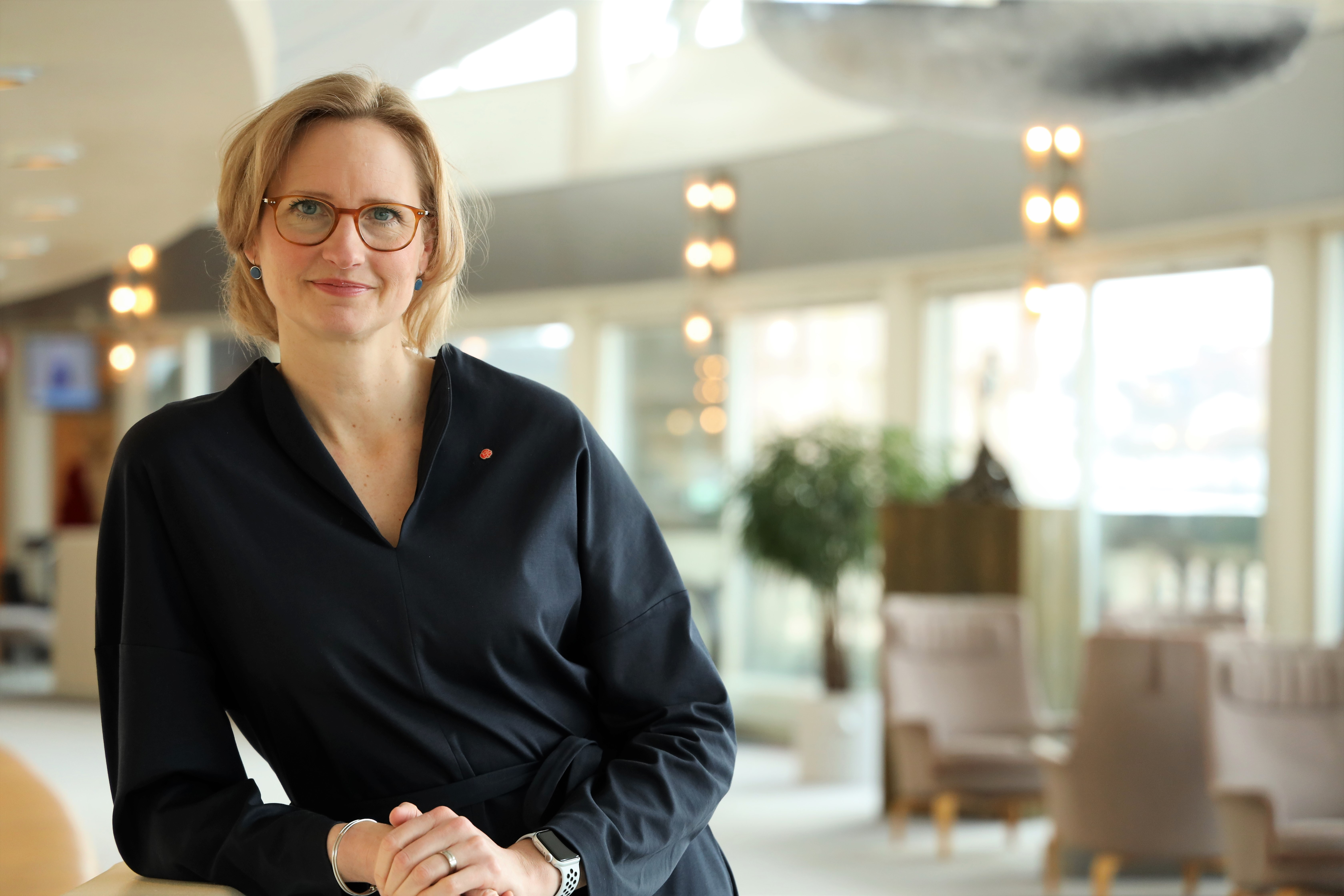
- Eriksson in 2022

Member of the Riksdag
- Incumbent
- Assumed office 22 March 2018
- Preceded by: Gabriel Wikström
- Constituency: Västmanland County

Personal details
- Born: Åsa Elisabeth Eriksson; 1972 (age 53–54)
- Party: Social Democratic Party
- Education: Uppsala University
- Sports career
Medal record
Women's curling
Representing Sweden
World Junior Championships
| Gold medal – first place | 1991 Glasgow | Women's |
| Bronze medal – third place | 1992 Oberstdorf | Women's |

Åsa Elisabeth Eriksson (born 1972) is a Swedish politician, trade unionist and a Member of the Riksdag, the national legislature. A member of the Social Democratic Party, she has represented Västmanland County since March 2018. She had previously been a substitute member of the Riksdag three times: August 2016 to April 2017 (for Olle Thorell); October 2017 to March 2018 (for Anna Wallén); and March 2018 (for Anna Wallén).

Eriksson is the daughter of teachers Björn Eriksson and Anna-Britta Eriksson (née Sjögren). She has a teaching degree from the Uppsala University. She played curling in her youth and was part of the gold winning Swedish team in the 1991 World Junior Curling Championships.

She has been a member of the municipal council in Norberg Municipality since 2011, and was chairwoman (mayor) of the municipal board from 2011 to 2017.
