= Pirjo Lahdenperä =

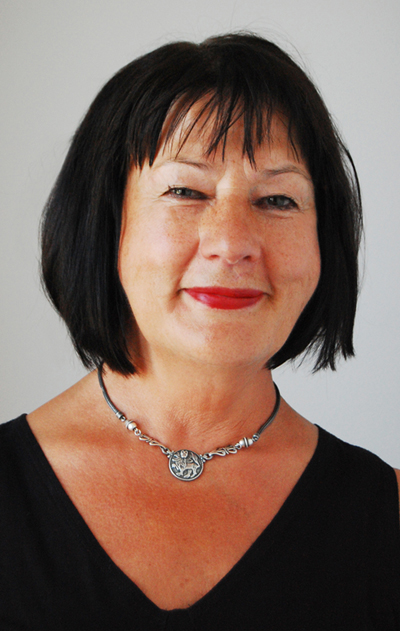
Pirjo Lahdenperä

Pirjo Lahdenperä, born 1949, is a licensed psychologist and a professor Emerita of pedagogy with a focus on management and leadership at Mälardalen University, the Academy of Education, Culture and Communication (UKK).

In 2005, Pirjo Lahdenperä was recognized as Sweden's first professor of pedagogy with a focus on intercultural pedagogy.

== Presentation ==
Pirjo Lahdenperä has experience as a school psychologist in the municipality of Stockholm and as an educator in state's school leader education SLUG (what is now known as principal's education). She has worked as teacher, schools staff educator, pedagogical leader and researcher at the Department of Education of the Stockholm School of Education and at Södertörn University, being at the latter also a profile manager for intercultural teacher education.

During the 80's and 90's, she was involved in different courses dealing with special education, intercultural education, organization and leadership. She mainly focused on the development of new curricula at different levels and worked as a course leader. At the Södertörn University, she planned a teacher educational programme with multicultural focus (1997–1999) and a second one with intercultural orientation (2002–2005). She developed the master's programs in the field of intercultural pedagogy and intercultural leadership.

In addition to her regular teaching activities as a lecturer and professor in pedagogy at the College of Higher Education and Södertörn University, she participated as a lecturer in a large number of national and international programs and conferences as well as in school staff retreats. In the beginning of 2000 she was employed as head of the Mälardalens Leadership Center at Mälardalen University. In 2006-2008 she worked as a professor in the municipality of Södertälje and as research director at the Center for Intercultural School Research, part of the Cultural Center in Botkyrka.

At present, she is professor emerita in Education with focus on management and leadership at the Academy of Education, Culture and Communication at Mälardalen University, and runs the company Education Lahdenperä AB.
