= Mikael Damsgaard =

Swedish politician (born 1976)

Member of the Riksdag
- Incumbent
- Assumed office 2 July 2019
- Constituency: Västmanland County

Personal details
- Born: 1976 (age 49–50)
- Party: Moderate

Mikael Damsgaard (born 1976) is a Swedish politician. Since July 2019, he serves as a Member of the Riksdag representing the constituency of Västmanland County. He became a member after Jessica Polfjärd resigned.

He was also elected as a Member of the Riksdag in September 2022.
