= Gernandt =

Gernandt is a Germanic surname derived from a compound given name, from *gaizaz (OHG gēr) 'spear' and *nanþaz 'daring'. It may refer to:

- Anders Gernandt (disambiguation), multiple people
- Tygo Gernandt (born 1974), Dutch actor
- William F. Gernandt, American architect who designed buildings built in the first three decades of the 20th century
