= Jonas Cronert =

Swedish politician (born 1980)

Member of the Riksdag
- Incumbent
- Assumed office 28 September 2026
- Constituency: Västmanland County

Personal details
- Born: 1980 (age 45–46) Västerås, Sweden
- Party: Social Democratic Party

Jonas Kristian Cronert (born 1980) is a Swedish politician and Member of the Riksdag. A member of the Social Democratic Party, he has represented Västmanland County since September 2026.

Cronert was born in 1980 at the maternity hospital (BB) in Västerås. He grew up in the mining town of Skultuna. He was a housing supervisor and trade union representative for the Swedish Association of Local Government Employees (SKTF).

Cronert became a political secretary in Västerås in 2011 and has been active in the Social Democratic Party since 2014. He was a member of the municipal council in Västerås and a municipal commissioner (kommunalråd). He was elected to the Riksdag at the 2026 general election.

Cronert lives with his partner in Rönnby and has a daughter.
