= Anders Gernandt =

Anders Gernandt may refer to:

- Anders Gernandt (politician) (1916–2008), Swedish politician
- Anders Gernandt (equestrian) (1920–2000), Swedish horse rider
