= Roger Haddad =

Swedish politician (born 1978)

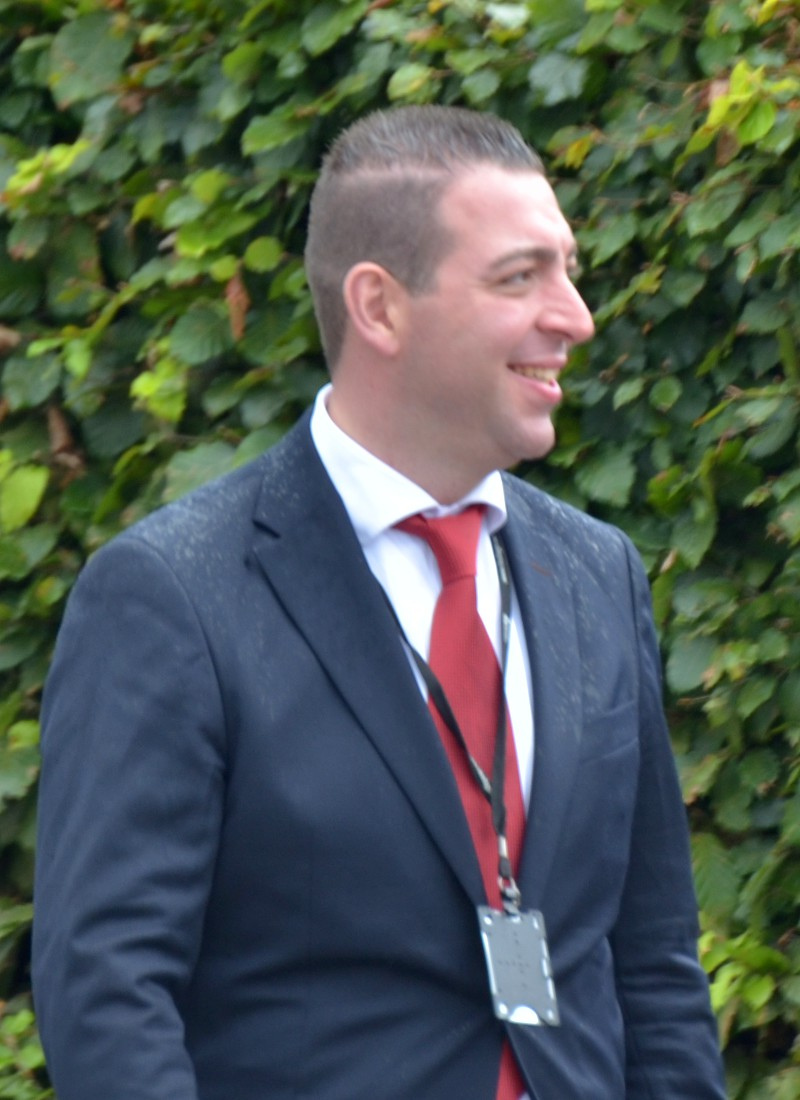

Member of the Riksdag
- Incumbent
- Assumed office 28 September 2026
- Constituency: Västmanland County
- In office 2010–2022
- Constituency: Västmanland County

Personal details
- Born: 25 March 1978 (age 48) Beirut, Lebanon
- Party: Liberals

Roger Haddad (born 25 March 1978) is a Swedish politician from the Liberals. He was a member of the Riksdag from 2010 to 2022, elected for the Västmanland County constituency. After the 2026 Swedish general election, he was again elected as a member of the Riksdag for the Liberals.

== Early life ==
Haddad was born in Beirut, Lebanon.

== Education ==
Haddad holds a Master of Social Science in political science. He was previously involved in student politics both locally and nationally, and was a board member (1998-2000) and vice chairman (2000-2001) of the Student Union in Sundsvall, as well as a board member of the Swedish National Union of Students (2000-2001).

== Local politics ==
During the 2002–2006 term of office, Haddad was a deputy in the Västerås city council and a member of the education committee and the committee for the disabled. Since 2006, he has been a member of the Västerås city council, having received the most personal election votes. Haddad was a municipal councilor for the People's Party in Västerås from 2006 to 2010. He was chairman of the education committee (from 1 January 2008 the education and labour market committee) from 2006 to 2010. During his time as a municipal councilor, he also took the initiative for a council for Roma issues in the municipality.

He was group leader for the Folkpartiet in Västerås in 2010.

== National politics ==
Haddad has been a member of his party's board since 2007. He was elected as a member of parliament for the Liberal People's Party in the 2010 Swedish general election by being personally elected and entered into the Swedish Parliament.

In the Riksdag, Haddad was Vice Chair of the Committee on Education (2018–2021), and First Vice Chair of the Committee on the Labour Market (2021–2022). He was previously a member of the Education Committee (2012–2014), the Labour Market Committee (2014–2015), and the Committee on Justice (2015–2018).

Haddad was the Liberal Party's labour market policy spokesperson from 2021 to 2022. He was the party's school policy spokesperson from 2019 to 2021. He was the party's spokesperson on legal policy issues from 2015 to 2018. In 2010, Haddad formed a network in the Riksdag to focus on Roma issues.

In the 2022 Swedish general election, he ran again for the Riksdag, but was unseated as the Liberals lost their mandate in the Västmanland County constituency. In the 2026 Swedish general election, he once again ran for parliament and was elected as a member of parliament in the Västmanland County constituency.

== Other activities ==
On 23 January 2011, Haddad was elected to the Västmanland Academy in chair no. 17. On 1 April 2011, the government appointed Haddad as a member of the board of the Swedish National Police Board. He held this position until April 2015. He has also been active in the Swedish-Burma Committee, where he was a board member (2003-2006) and chairman (2006-2007).

== See also ==
- List of members of the Riksdag, 2010–2014
- List of members of the Riksdag, 2014–2018
- List of members of the Riksdag, 2018–2022
- List of members of the Riksdag, 2026–2030
