= Lars Eriksson (politician) =

Swedish politician (born 1970)

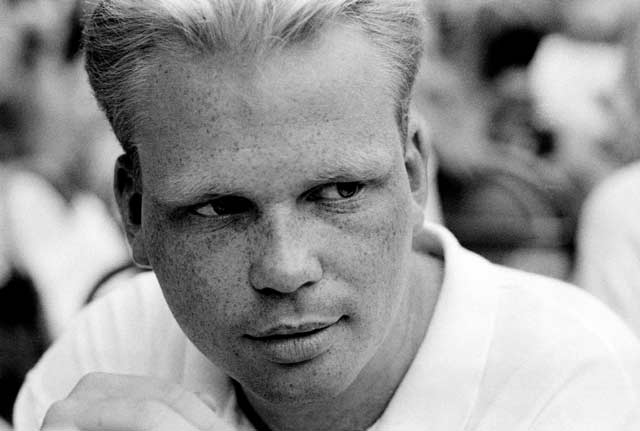

Member of the Riksdag
- In office 1 October 2012 – 19 March 2018
- Preceded by: Sven-Erik Österberg
- Succeeded by: Gabriel Wikström
- Constituency: Västmanland County

Personal details
- Born: 1970 (age 55–56)
- Party: Social Democratic Party

Lars Eriksson (born 1970) is a Swedish politician and former member of the Riksdag, the national legislature. A member of the Social Democratic Party, he represented Västmanland County between October 2012 and March 2018. He had been a substitute member of the Riksdag for Sven-Erik Österberg in October 2006.
