= Amanda Lindblad =

Swedish politician (born 1991)

Member of the Riksdag
- Incumbent
- Assumed office 28 September 2026
- Constituency: Västmanland County

Personal details
- Born: 1991 (age 34–35) Västerås, Sweden
- Party: Social Democratic Party
- Education: Uppsala University

Sonja Amanda Lindblad (born 1991) is a Swedish politician and Member of the Riksdag. A member of the Social Democratic Party, she has represented Västmanland County since September 2026.

Lindblad was born in 1991 in Västerås. She grew up in Åkra, Dalhem and Bäckby. She has a master’s degree in political science from Uppsala University. She has worked as analyst for the Swedish Union of Tenants and as a political secretary.

Lindblad joined the Social Democratic Party at the age of 17 and is a member of the municipal council in Sala and a municipal commissioner (kommunalråd). She was elected to the Riksdag at the 2026 general election.

Lindblad lives with her partner in Sala.
