= Lena Johansson =

Swedish politician (born 1969)

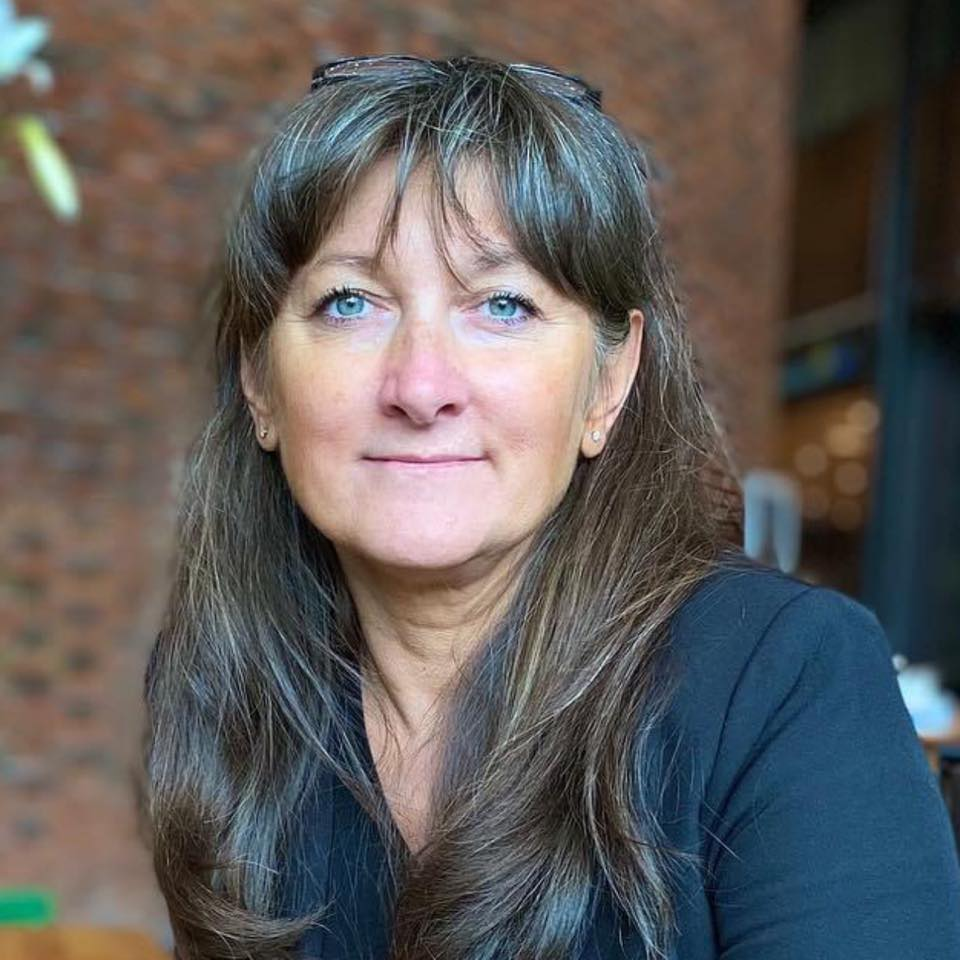
- Lena Johansson (2022)

Member of the Riksdag
- Incumbent
- Assumed office 26 September 2022
- Constituency: Västmanland County

Personal details
- Born: 1969 (age 56–57)
- Party: Social Democratic Party

Lena Johansson (born 1969) is a Swedish politician and member of the Riksdag, the national legislature. A member of the Social Democratic Party, she has represented Västmanland County since September 2012. She had previously been a member of the municipal council in Köping Municipality.
