= Agneta Luttropp =

Swedish politician (born 1945)

Member of the Riksdag
- In office 4 October 2010 – 29 September 2014
- Constituency: Västmanland County

Personal details
- Born: 1945 (age 80–81)
- Party: Green Party

Vera Agneta Luttropp (born 1945) is a Swedish politician and former member of the Riksdag, the national legislature. A member of the Green Party, she represented Västmanland County between October 2010 and September 2014.
