= Anders Andersson (Moderate politician) =

Swedish politician (1928–1989)

MP for Västmanland County
- In office 1983–1989

Personal details
- Born: 30 August 1928 Ärla parish, Sweden
- Died: 8 May 1989 (age 60) Oskarshamn, Sweden
- Party: Moderate Party

Anders Gustav Andersson (30 August 1928 – 8 May 1989) was a Swedish farmer and politician who was a member of parliament for the Moderate Party from 1983 to 1989, elected from the Västmanland County constituency.

Andersson had a long political career behind him, including as a county councillor, when he came to the Riksdag in 1983. During his time as a county councillor, he distinguished himself by being one of the first to question the existence of county councils , as he believed that they were bureaucratic, cumbersome, costly and poor at providing citizens with the care and welfare they paid for. He was involved in issues related to agricultural policy, municipal self-government and improving the conditions for the development of sparsely populated areas.

In a plane crash outside Oskarshamn in 1989, Andersson died along with eleven other members of the Post and Telecommunications Commission who were flying together to participate in a study visit to one of the Swedish Telecommunications Administration's (Televerkets) telecommunications stations.
