= Mariann Ytterberg =

Swedish politician (born 1941)

Member of the Riksdag
- In office 5 October 1998 – 2 October 2006
- Constituency: Västmanland County

Personal details
- Born: 1941 (age 84–85)
- Party: Social Democratic Party

Mariann Ytterberg (born 1941) is a Swedish politician and former member of the Riksdag, the national legislature. A member of the Social Democratic Party, she represented Västmanland County between October 1998 and October 2006. She was also a substitute member of the Riksdag for Lena Hjelm-Wallén between October 1994 and October 1998.
