= Paavo Vallius =

Swedish politician (born 1949)

Member of the Riksdag
- In office 1 October 2002 – 2 October 2006
- Constituency: Västmanland County
- In office 3 October 1994 – 5 October 1998
- Constituency: Västmanland County

Personal details
- Born: 1949 (age 76–77)
- Party: Social Democratic Party

Paavo Olavi Vallius (born 1949) is a Swedish politician and former member of the Riksdag, the national legislature. A member of the Social Democratic Party, he represented Västmanland County between October 1994 and October 1998; and between October 2002 and October 2006. He was also a substitute member of the Riksdag for Lena Hjelm-Wallén between October 1998 and September 2002. He is a Swedish Finn.
