= Hawar Asaiesh =

Swedish politician (born 1985)

Member of the Riksdag
- Incumbent
- Assumed office 28 September 2026
- Constituency: Västmanland County

Personal details
- Born: 1985 (age 40–41) Kurdistan
- Party: Left Party

Hawar Asaiesh (born 1985) is a Swedish politician and Member of the Riksdag. A member of the Left Party, she has represented Västmanland County since September 2026.

Asaiesh was born in 1985 in Kurdistan. She grew up in Gryta, Västerås Municipality but later moved to Gideonsberg. She works at Västerås Folk High School and is an assistant principal.

Asaiesh joined the Left Party in 2016 and has been a member of the party's national board since 2024. She is a member of the municipal council in Västerås where she serves as a municipal commissioner (kommunalråd). She was elected to the Riksdag at the 2026 general election.
