= Sven-Olof Sällström =

Swedish politician (1968–2024)

Sven-Olof Sällström SD
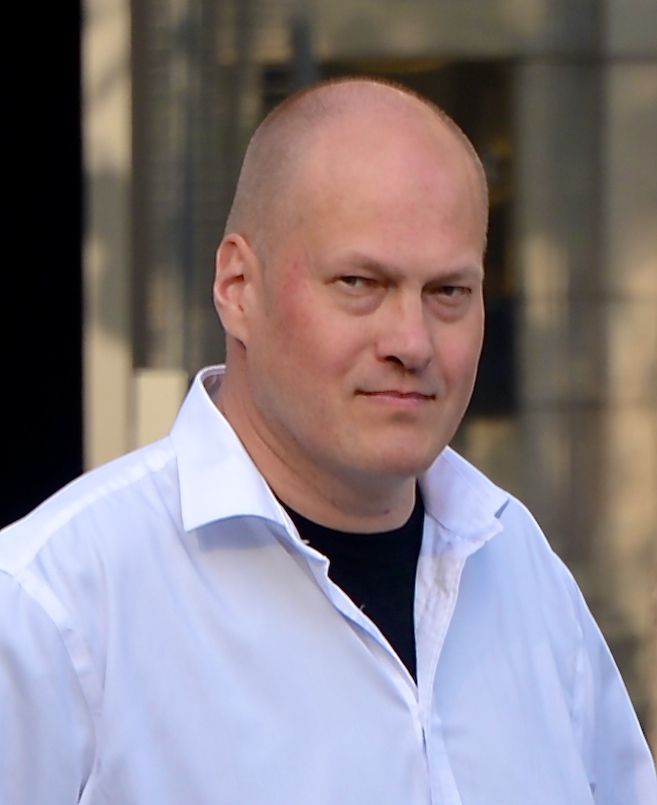
- Sällström in 2014

Member of the Riksdag
- In office 4 October 2010 – 14 March 2024
- Constituency: Kronoberg County

Personal details
- Born: 4 October 1968 Ånge, Sweden
- Died: 14 March 2024 (aged 55)
- Party: Sweden Democrats (from 2006); Centre Party (before 2006)

Sven-Olof Sällström (4 October 1968 – 14 March 2024) was a Swedish politician who was a member of the Riksdag for the Sweden Democrats between 2010 and 2024.

Sällström originally worked as a store manager before his political career. He was a member of the Centre Party and the Liberals before joining the Sweden Democrats in 2006. He unsuccessfully stood for the party during the 2009 European Parliament elections before he was elected to the Riksdag during the 2010 Swedish general election. In 2012, he succeeded Erik Almqvist as the Sweden Democrats' economic spokesperson after Almqvist was forced to resign as a result of the so-called iron pipe scandal. He held the position until 2014 when Oscar Sjöstedt succeeded him.

Sven-Olof Sällström died of bile duct and liver cancer on 14 March 2024, at the age of 55.
