= Göran Magnusson (politician) =

Swedish politician (1939–2010)

Member of the Riksdag
- In office 1 October 1985 – 2 October 2006
- Constituency: Västmanland County

Personal details
- Born: 1939
- Died: 19 February 2010 (aged 70)
- Party: Social Democratic Party

Karl Einar Göran Magnusson (1939 – 19 February 2010) was a Swedish politician and member of the Riksdag, the national legislature. A member of the Social Democratic Party, he represented Västmanland County between October 1985 and October 2006. He was also a substitute member of the Riksdag twice: between October 1982 and November 1982 (for Olle Göransson); and between October 1984 and September 1985 (for Lena Hjelm-Wallén). He died on 19 February 2010 aged 70.
