= Olle Thorell =

Swedish politician (born 1967)

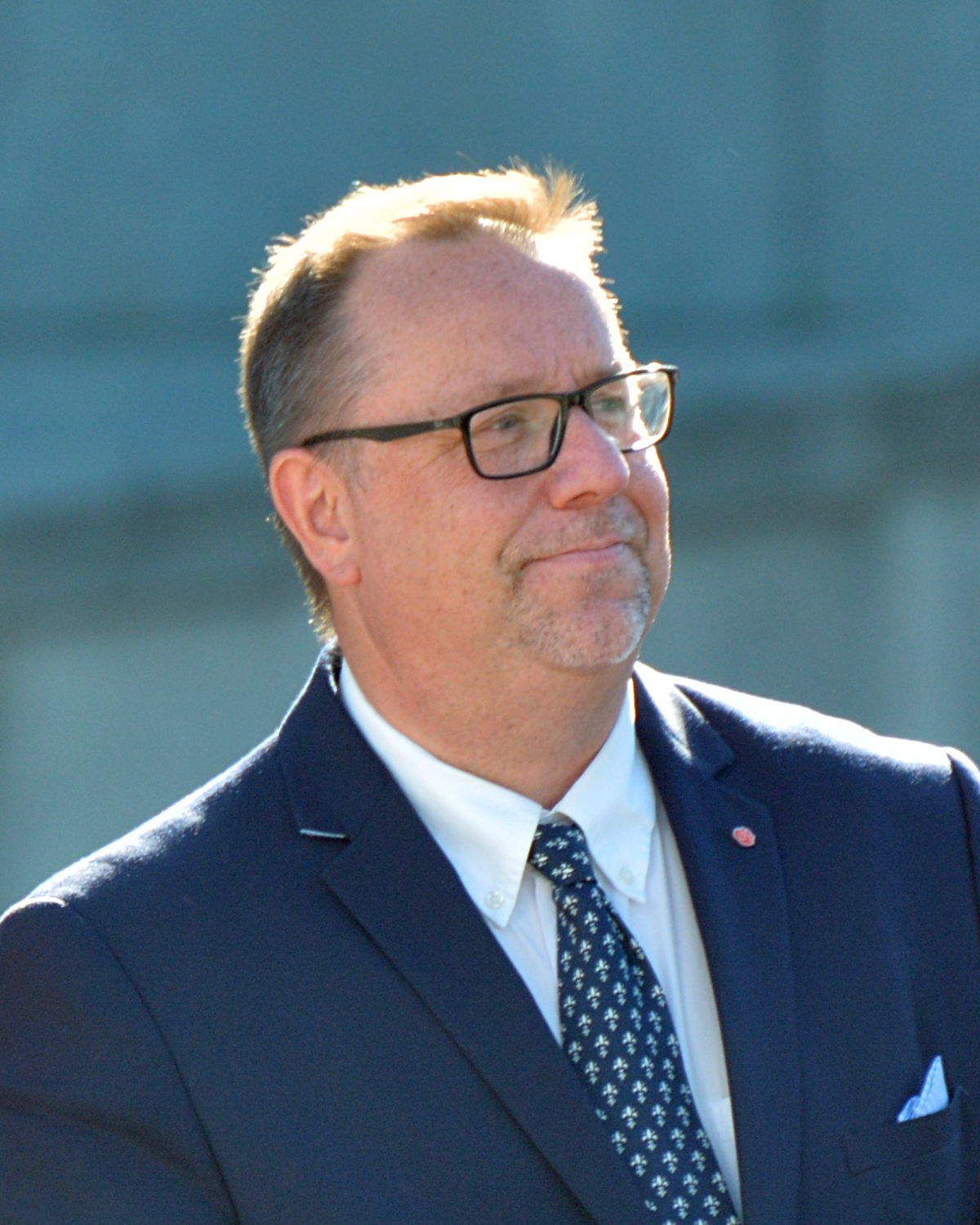
- Thorell in September 2018

Member of the Riksdag
- Incumbent
- Assumed office 2 October 2006
- Constituency: Västmanland County

Personal details
- Born: Lars Olof Thorell; 1967 (age 58–59)
- Party: Social Democratic Party
- Education: Mälardalen University College

Lars Olof Thorell (born 1967) is a Swedish politician, teacher and member of the Riksdag, the national legislature. A member of the Social Democratic Party, he has represented Västmanland County since October 2006.

Thorell is the son of engineer Lars Håkan Thorell and teacher Kia Ericson (née Scherlund). He was educated at Jamestown High School in the United States and in Hallstahammar. He studied part-time at Uppsala University and political science and economic history at Mälardalen University College. He taught Swedish for immigrants (SFI) at the Arbetarnas bildningsförbund (ABF) in Hedemora between 1990 and 1995 and was a Komvux tutor in Sala between 1995 and 1998. He was a high school (högstadium) teacher in Surahammar Municipality between 1998 and 2004.
