= Jörgen Johansson =

Swedish politician (1947–2010)

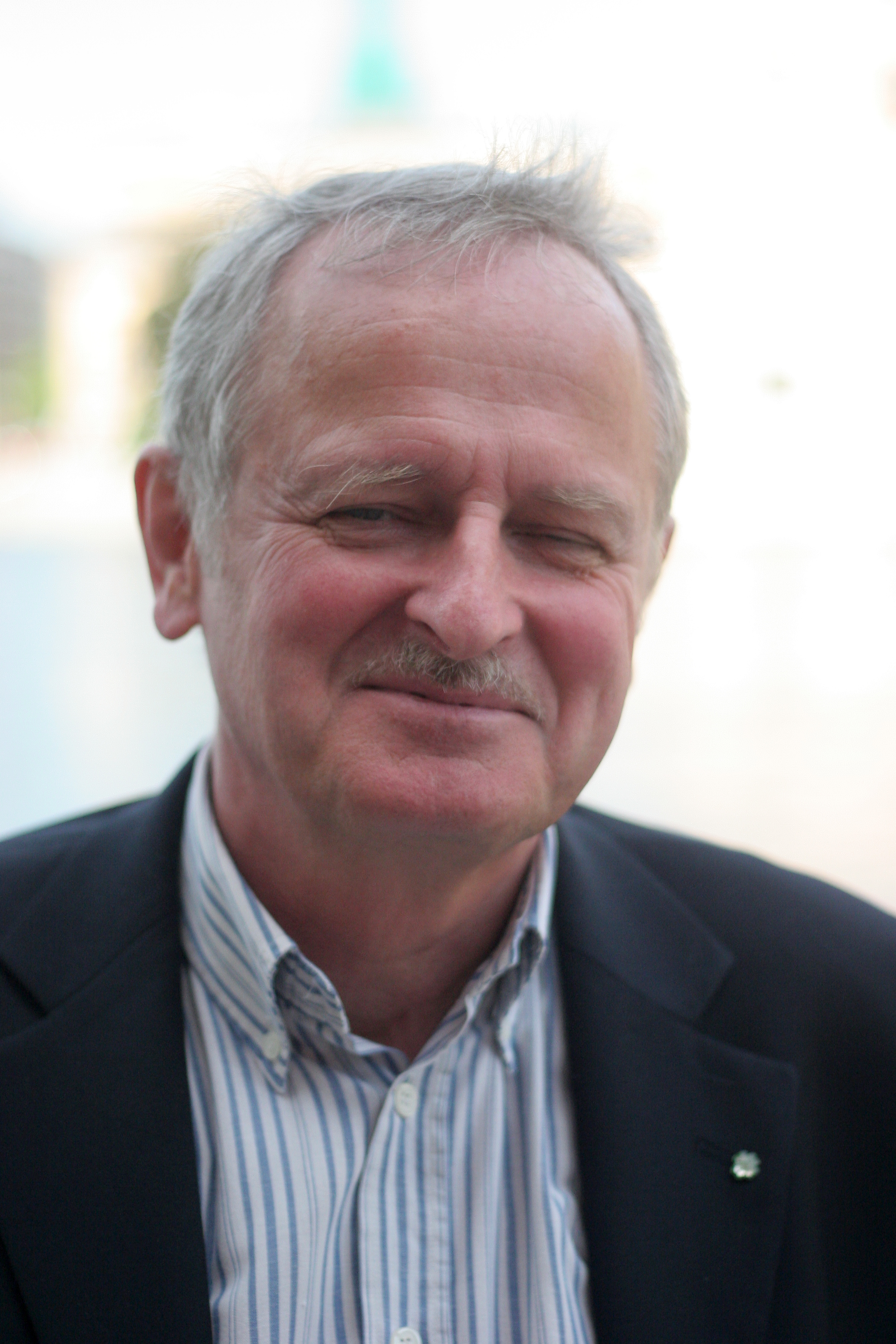
Jörgen Johansson.

Jörgen Johansson (1947 – 13 June 2010) was a Swedish Centre Party politician, member of the Riksdag since 2002.
