= Kerstin Heinemann =

Swedish politician (born 1942)

Kerstin Heinemann (born 1942 in Tärnsjö, Västmanland County) is a Swedish Liberal People's Party politician. She was a member of the Riksdag from 1994 until 2006, and the Second Vice Speaker of the Riksdag from 2002 until 2006.
