= Jessica Polfjärd =

Swedish politician (born 1971)

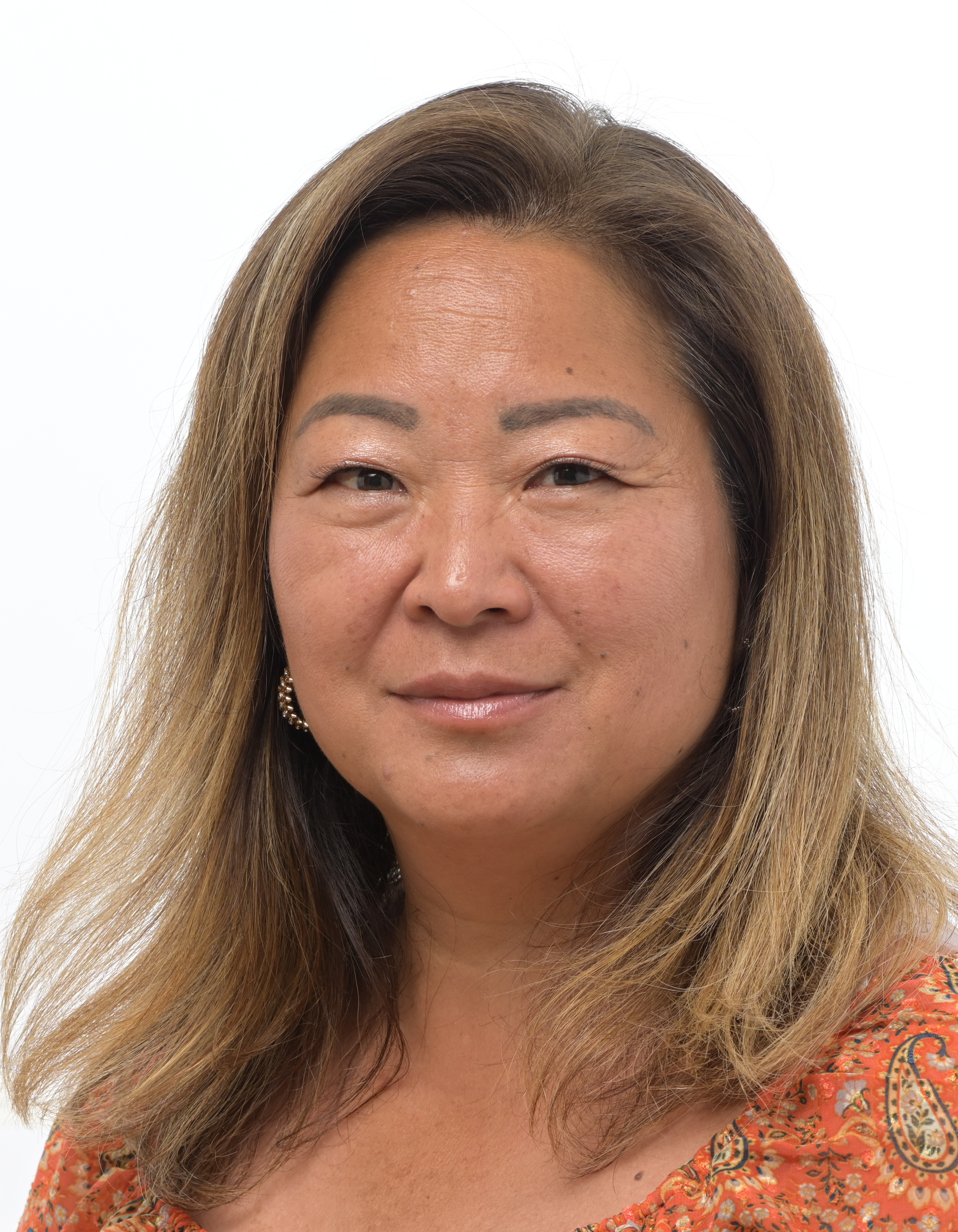
- Official portrait, 2024

Member of the European Parliament
- Incumbent
- Assumed office 2 July 2019
- Constituency: Sweden

President of the Nordic Council
- In office 1 January 2019 – 13 June 2019
- Preceded by: Michael Tetzschner
- Succeeded by: Hans Wallmark

Group Leader of the Moderate Party in the Swedish Riksdag
- In office 14 January 2015 – 3 October 2017
- Deputy: Hans Wallmark
- Party chairman: Anna Kinberg Batra
- Preceded by: Anna Kinberg Batra
- Succeeded by: Tobias Billström

Member of the Riksdag
- In office 2 October 2006 – 1 July 2019
- Constituency: Västmanland County

Personal details
- Born: Zindalai Kim; 27 May 1971 (age 53); Seoul, South Korea
- Political party: Moderate Party

Jessica Susanne Zindalai Polfjärd (born 27 May 1971) is a Korean-Swedish politician of the Moderate Party who has been serving as a Member of the European Parliament since the 2019 European Parliament election in Sweden. She was re-elected in the 2024 European Parliament election in Sweden.

== Political career ==
=== Career in national politics ===
Polfjärd has been a member of the Riksdag since the 2006 elections and served as chairman of the Employment Committee of the Riksdag from 2013 to 2014. She was also a member of the Committee on Industry and Trade from 2010 until 2013. She eventually served as the group leader of the Moderate Party in the Riksdag from January 2015 to October 2017.

In addition to her committee assignments, Polfjärd was a member of the Swedish delegation to the Nordic Council from 2006 until 2012 and from 2018 until 2019.

=== Member of the European Parliament, 2019–present ===
Since becoming a Member of the European Parliament in 2019, Polfjärd has been serving on the Committee on the Environment, Public Health and Food Safety. In this capacity, she has been her group's rapporteur on national climate targets for EU countries and greenhouse gas emission cuts (2022); a law to make batteries more sustainable (2022); a law for the circular economy and second-hand market (2023); and a European Commission proposal to legalize new gene-editing technologies for crops (2023).

== Other activities ==
- Nordisk Kulturfond, Substitute Member of the Board (2019)
