= Margareta Israelsson =

Swedish politician (born 1954)

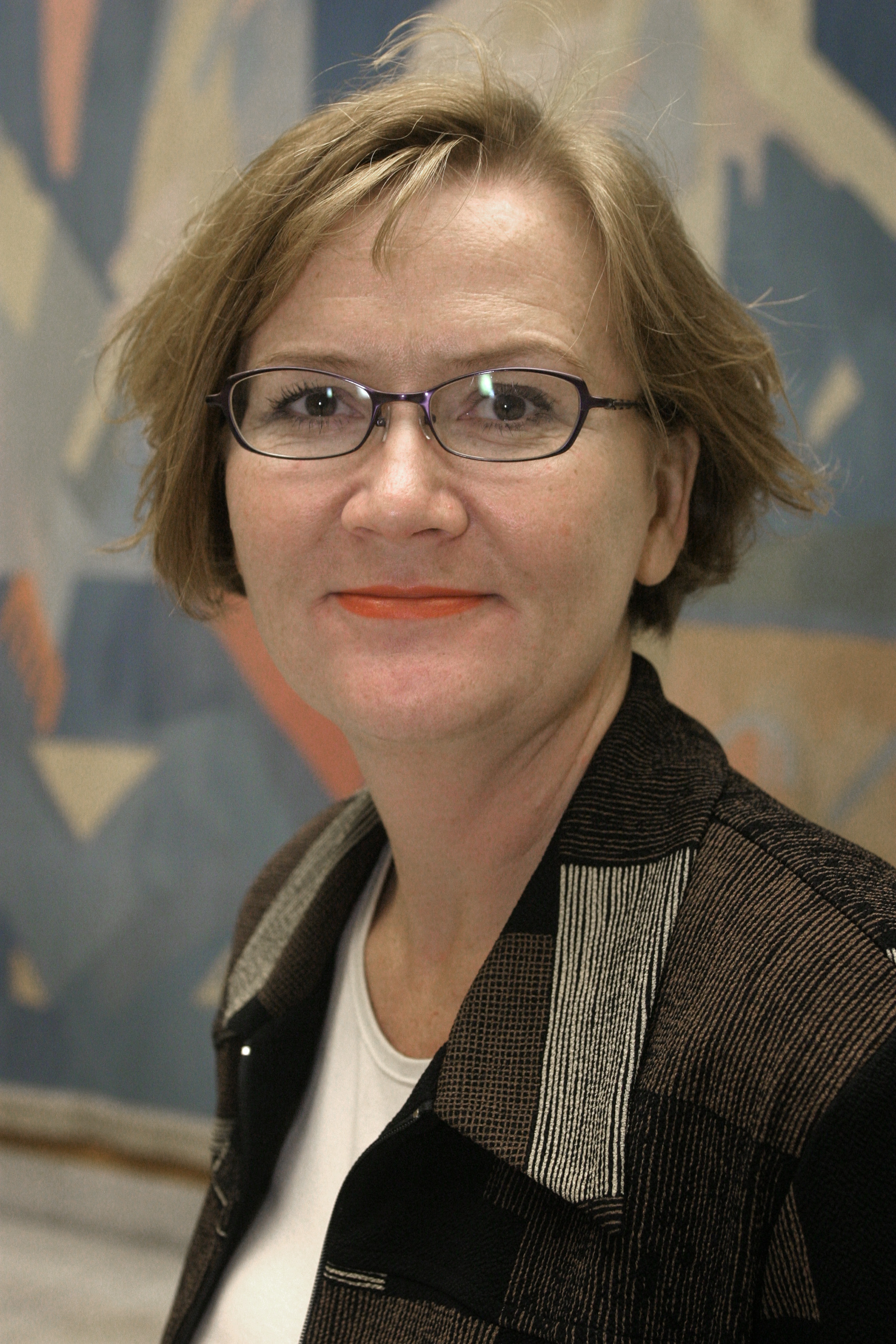

Margareta Israelsson (born 1954) is a Swedish Social Democratic politician. She has been a member of the Riksdag since 1984.
