= Oscar Sjöstedt =

Swedish politician (born 1981)

Oscar Sjöstedt SD
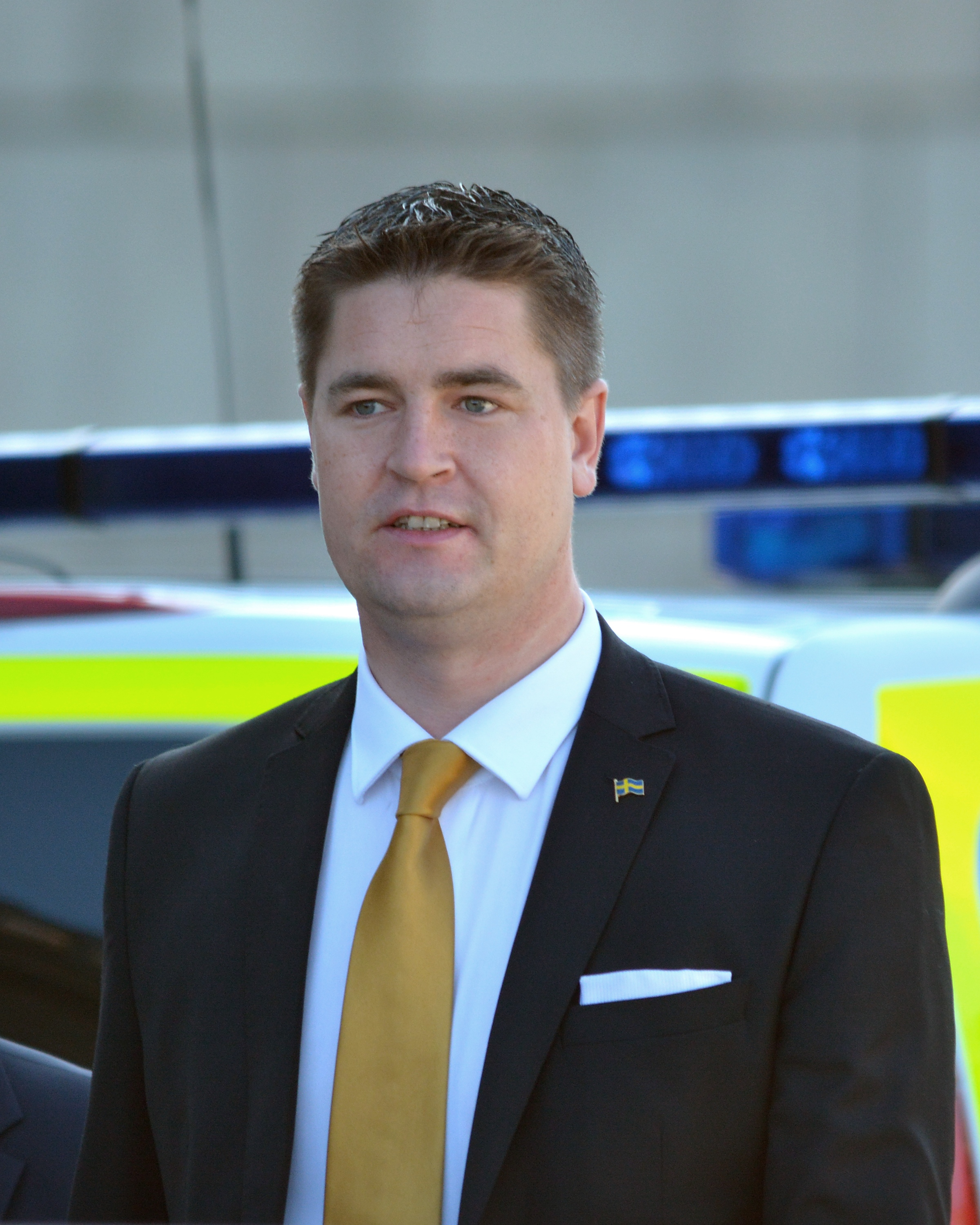

Member of the Riksdag
- Incumbent
- Assumed office 29 September 2014

Economics spokesman for the Sweden Democrats
- Incumbent
- Assumed office 2014
- Preceded by: Sven-Olof Sällström
- Constituency: Södermanland County

Personal details
- Born: Per Oscar Evert Sjöstedt; 6 February 1981 (age 45) Stockholm, Sweden
- Party: Sweden Democrats
- Education: Stockholm University (BA)

Per Oscar Evert Sjöstedt (born 6 February 1981) is a Swedish politician and member of the Riksdag for the Sweden Democrats party. He has also served as the SD's finance and economics spokesman since 2014.

== Biography ==
Sjöstedt studied at Stockholm University and graduated with a Bachelor's degree in economics. He worked as a civil servant in the finance department for the Riksdag and then for Sveriges Television (SVT) and the Swedish Educational Broadcasting Company.

He also served as chairman of the Sweden Democrat Youth's (SDU) chapter in Stockholm. Sjöstedt was elected to the Riksdag during the 2014 Swedish general election and served as the financial and economic spokesman for the Sweden Democrats, taking on the role from Sven-Olof Sällström. He initially announced he would not to seek another term in office before the 2018 Swedish general election, however he subsequently returned to parliament and resumed his role as the SD's financial spokesman.

== Controversies ==
Sjöstedt became embroiled in controversy in 2016 when it was revealed he had attended a party organized by the Swedish neo-Nazi magazine Info-14 during his time at high school while he was a member of the SDU. At the same time, a former school peer alleged Sjöstedt chanted pro-Nazi slogans at school and released footage of what he said was Sjöstedt laughing at antisemitic jokes made by a co-worker. Sjöstedt responded by claiming that he had attended the party at the invitation of a friend but left after discovering who had organized the event, denied he had supported any fascist movements and described the accusations of chanting slogans as "absurd." The Sweden Democrats' leadership investigated the allegation and responded by stating that while Sjöstedt should have been more careful, they were satisfied that he was an opponent of Nazism.

In 2020, Sjöstedt criticized the Swedish Social Democrats and the Swedish Migration Court over a decision to grant residency to a mentally disabled Afghan national. Sjöstedt was reported to have proclaimed "What do you say about that - instead of pursuing a migration policy where we attract people with low intellect - we pursue a policy where we attract people with high intellect?" during a debate on the matter in the Riksdag. Sjöstedt's comment was condemned by disability charities and the Social Democrats. Both Sjöstedt and the Sweden Democrats responded by stating the comments had been aimed at the Migration Court and not people with disabilities. Sjöstedt furthermore claimed that he was attacking a decision by the court to prioritize immigrants who cannot economically contribute to Sweden over skilled immigrants.
