= Kent Persson =

Swedish politician (born 1951)

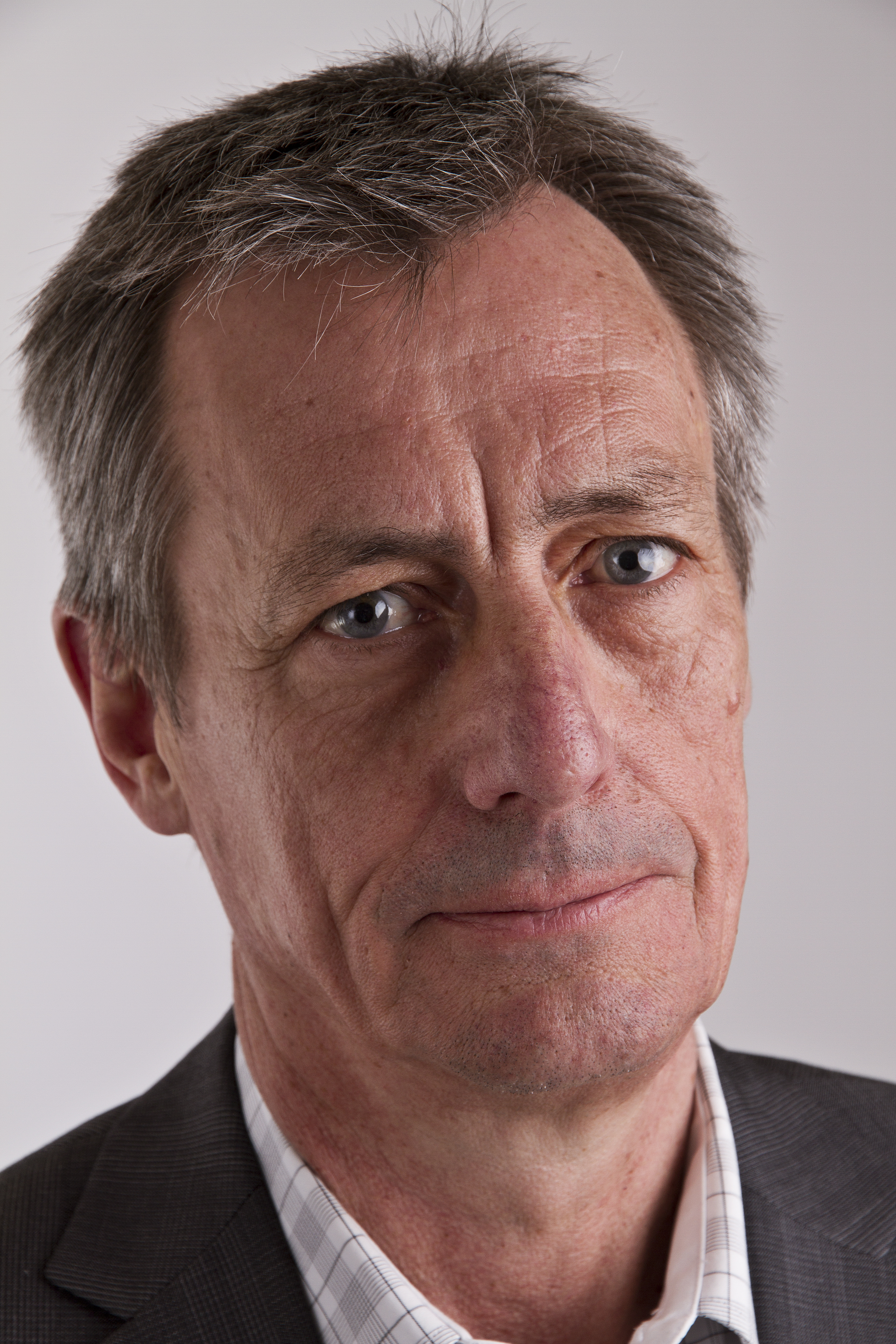
Kent Persson

Kent Persson (born 1951) is a Swedish politician of the Left Party. He was member of the Riksdag from 2006 to 2014.
