= Staffan Anger =

Swedish politician (born 1943)

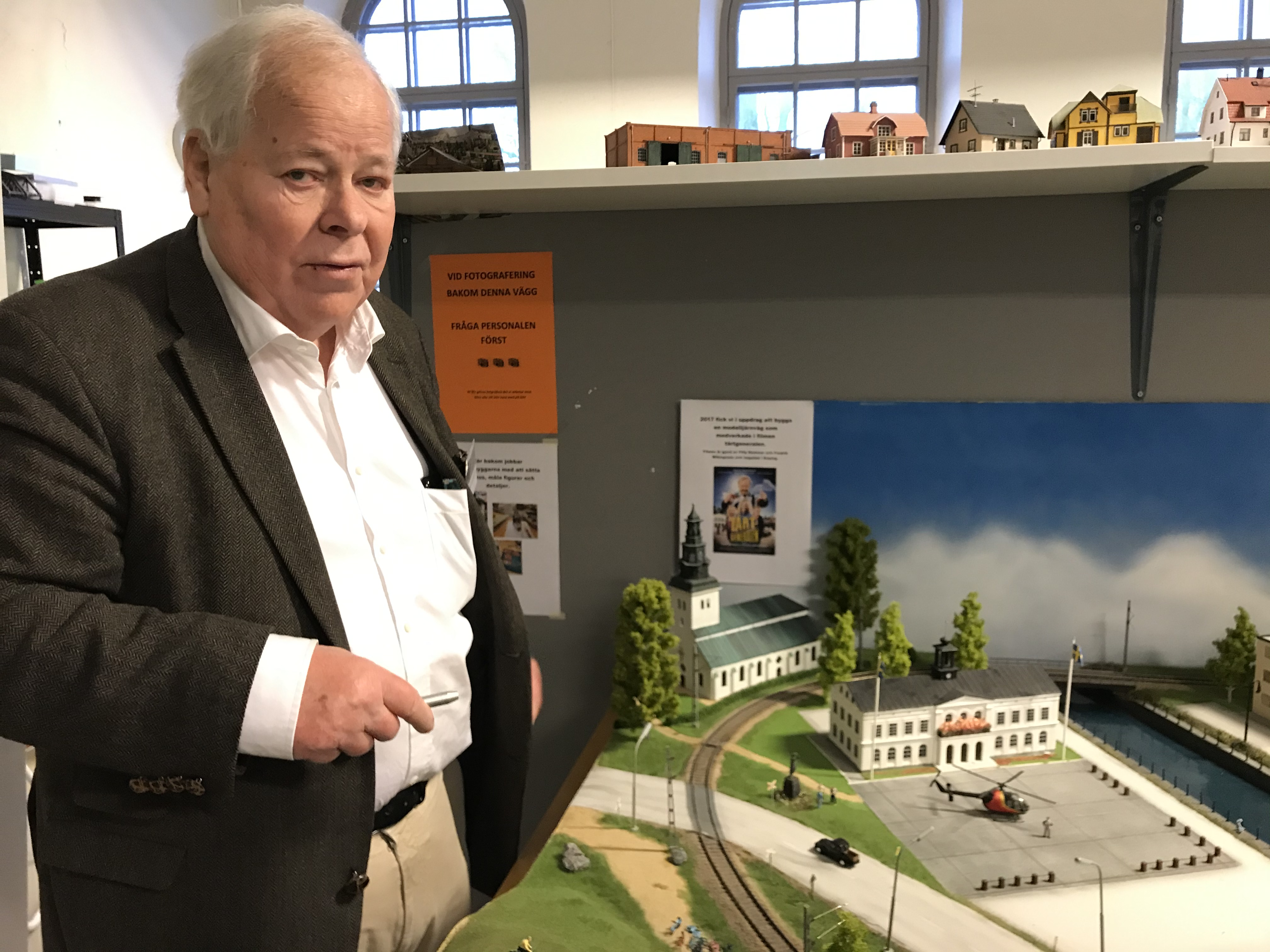

Member of the Swedish Parliament
- In office 2006–2014

Personal details
- Born: 1943 (age 81–82)
- Occupation: Businessman

Hans Staffan Folke Anger (born 1943) is a Swedish businessman. He was a member of the Swedish Parliament between 2006 and 2014.

Anger is one of the founders, and the managing director, of the model railway and miniature landscape attraction Miniature Kingdom in Kungsör.
