= Vasiliki Tsouplaki =

Swedish politician (born 1980)

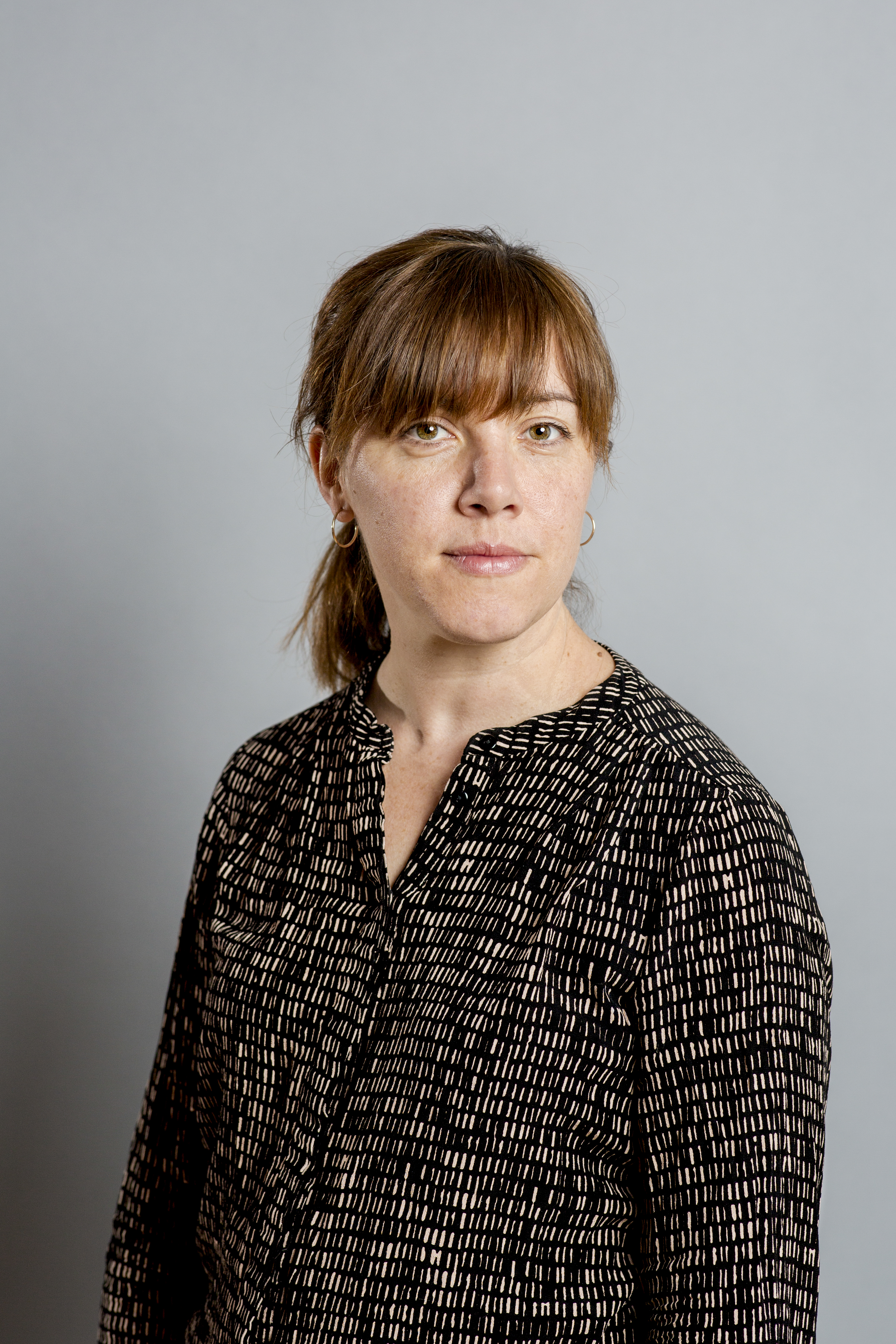
- Tsouplaki in 2018

Member of the Riksdag
- Incumbent
- Assumed office 1 November 2017
- Constituency: Västmanland County

Personal details
- Born: 1980 (age 45–46)
- Party: Left Party

Vasiliki Tsouplaki (born 1980) is a Swedish politician. Since November 2017, she serves as Member of the Riksdag. She is affiliated with the Left Party. She represents the constituency of Västmanland County.

She was elected as Member of the Riksdag in September 2018 and again in September 2022.
