= Anna Wallén =

Swedish politician (born 1980)

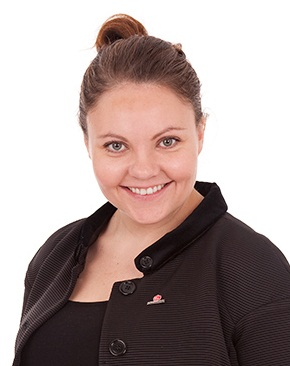
- Born: 1980 (age 45–46)
- Occupation: Politician
- Known for: Member of the Riksdag

Anna Wallén (born 1980) is a Swedish Social Democratic Party politician.

She was elected member of the Riksdag for the period 2010–2018, from the Västmanland County constituency.
