= Pia Nilsson (politician) =

Swedish politician (born 1962)

Pia Nilsson S
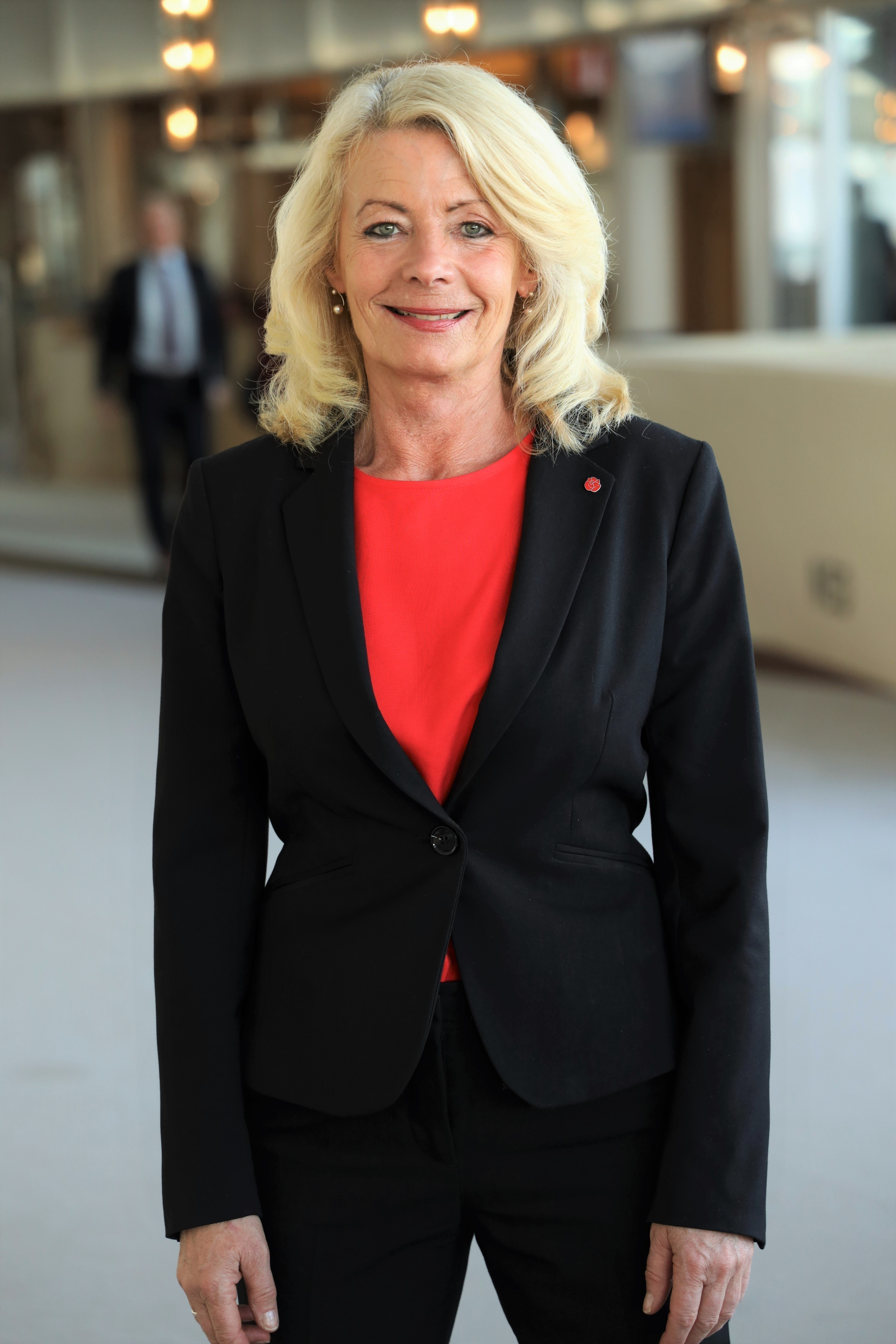
- Pia Nilsson's official portrait Picture: Sveriges riksdag

Member of the Swedish Parliament for Värmland County constituency
- Incumbent
- Assumed office 2004

Member of the Sala municipal council
- Incumbent
- Assumed office 1985

Personal details
- Born: 31 March 1962 (age 64)
- Party: Social Democratic Party
- Children: 1 daughter
- Parents: Bo Nilsson; Inger Nilsson (née Thunberg)
- Education: Örebro University (BA); Mälardalen University College
- Profession: Politician, teacher
- Website: Socialdemokraterna: Riksdagsgruppen

Inger Pia-Lena Nilsson (born 31 March 1962) is a Swedish Social Democratic politician. She has been a member of the Riksdag since 2004. She is currently taking up seat number 23 for Värmland County constituency. She has been a member of the municipal council of Sala Municipality since 1985. She has also been a member of the municipal board of the municipality from 1994 up until 2004.

== Biography ==
Inger Pia-Lena Nilsson was born on 31 March 1965, to Bo Nilsson, a metal worker, and Inger Nilsson (née Thunberg), a nurse. She grew up in Sala and went to high-school there, where she studied social science and graduated in 1981. After she finished high-school she started working as a cashier (shop assistant) from 1981 until 1984. Nilson later attended Örebro University from 1989 until 1992 and graduated with a Bachelor's degree and a degree in information and communications technology. During the same time as she was studying at Örebro University, she was working as a substitute teacher from 1989 until 1992. Nilson also has worked as an Information Assistant from 1992 until 1994. After she stopped working as an Information Assistant, Nilson started working as a Swedish as a second language teacher from 1994 until 1997. She later began studying literature at Mälardalen University College from 1997 until 1998 and again in 2004 until 2005, during the time she was studying she was also working as a Swedish teacher from 1997 until 2004.

== Political Missions ==
=== Missions in the Riksdag ===
Since 2018 general election, Nilsson has been a member of the Committee on Education, as well as an alternate for the Committee on European Union Affairs. She has also been a member of the Committee on Civil-Law Legislation from 2005 until 2006, the Committee on Transport and Communications from 2006 until 2018, and the Committee on Finance from 2011 until 2014. She has as also been a member of The Riksdag Board (Riksdagsstyrelsen) from October 2010 until February 2012, The Election Review Board (Valprövningsnämnden) from April 2011 to February 2015, and the War Delegation from October 2014 until October 2018.

=== Missions in the Social Democratic Party ===
Nilsson is also a member of the Board for the Social Democratic party since 2007. Nilsson is also a member of the district board of Västmanland.

=== Other Missions ===
Nilsson is also an alternate for the Bank of Sweden Tercentenary Foundation.

== Personal life ==
Nilson lives in Sala with her partner and her teenage daughter.
