= Anders Gernandt (politician) =

Swedish politician (1916–2008)

Member of the Riksdag
- In office 1971–1976, 1979–1982

Personal details
- Born: 18 July 1916
- Died: 23 August 2008
- Political party: Centre Party

Anders Konrad Svante Gernandt (18 July 1916 – 23 August 2008) was a Swedish politician. He was a member of the Centre Party.
