= Caroline Högström =

Swedish politician (born 1991)

Sofia Caroline Magdalena Högström (born 10 November 1991 in Västernorrland County) is a Swedish politician from the Moderate Party. Since 2022, she has been member of the Riksdag for Västernorrland County.
