= Tomas Högström =

Swedish politician (born 1954)

Tomas Högström (born February 10, 1954) is a Swedish politician of the Moderate Party, member of the Riksdag 1994–2006.
