= Mälardalen University =

Swedish university college

- Mälardalens universitet
- Type: Public
- Established: 1977; 48 years ago
- President: Martin Hellström
- Administrative staff: 1160
- Students: 18,000 (FTE)
- Doctoral students: 244
- Location: Västerås (main campus) and Eskilstuna, Sweden; 59°37′07″N 16°32′26″E
- Campus: Urban
- Colors: Orange and White
- Website: https://mdu.se

Mälardalen University (Swedish: Mälardalens universitet), or MDU, is a Swedish university located in Västerås and Eskilstuna, Sweden. It has 18,000 students and around 1000 employees, of which 91 are professors, 504 teachers, and 244 doctoral students. Mälardalen University is the world's first environmentally certified school according to the international standard ISO 14001.

In December 2020, the Löfven government proposed that the university has received university status from 1 January 2022.

== Research ==
The university has six different research specialisations: educational sciences and mathematics, embedded systems, future energy, health and welfare, industrial economics and management, and innovation and product realisation.

== Education ==
The university has education in economics, health and welfare, teacher education, and engineering, as well as art education in classical music and opera. Education at the research level is given within a dozen subjects.

== Organization ==
Mälardalen University is organized into four schools:

- School of Health, Care and Social Welfare
- School of Education, Culture, and Communication
- School of Sustainable Development of Society and Technology
- School of Innovation, Design, and Engineering

== See also ==
- List of universities in Sweden
