= List of members of the Riksdag, 1991–1994 =

This is a list of members of the Riksdag, the national parliament of Sweden. The Riksdag is a unicameral assembly with 349 members of parliament (Swedish: riksdagsledamöter), who at the time were elected on a proportional basis to serve fixed terms of three years. In the Riksdag, members are seated per constituency and not party. The following MPs were elected in the 1991 Swedish general election and served until the 1994 Swedish general election. Members of the Moderate Bildt Cabinet, the ruling party during this term, are marked in bold, party leaders of the seven parties represented in the Riksdag in italic.

== Elected parliamentarians ==
Name	Party	Constituency
Johnny Ahlqvist	Social Democrats	Kristianstads län
Stig Alemyr	Social Democrats	Kalmar län
Christel Anderberg	Moderate Party	Kopparbergs län
Arne Andersson	Moderate Party	Älvsborgs läns norra
Axel Andersson	Social Democrats	Gävleborgs län
Birger Andersson	Centre Party	Västmanlands län
Elving Andersson	Centre Party	Bohuslän
Georg Andersson	Social Democrats	Västerbottens län
Ingrid Andersson	Social Democrats	Uppsala län
Jan Andersson	Social Democrats	Fyrstadskretsen
John Andersson	Left Party	Västerbottens län
Lars Andersson	New Democracy	Örebro län
Marianne Andersson	Centre Party	Älvsborgs läns norra
Sten Andersson	Social Democrats	Stockholms kommun
Sten Andersson	Moderate Party	Fyrstadskretsen
Widar Andersson	Social Democrats	Gävleborgs län
Berit Andnor	Social Democrats	Jämtlands län
Owe Andréasson	Social Democrats	Hallands län
Ylva Annerstedt	Liberal People's Party	Stockholms län
Bo Arvidson	Moderate Party	Malmöhus län
Stefan Attefall	Christian Democrats	Västerbottens län
Kenneth Attefors	New Democracy	Kristianstads län
Rune Backlund	Centre Party	Jönköpings län
Jan Backman	Moderate Party	Fyrstadskretsen
Erling Bager	Liberal People's Party	Göteborgs kommun
Hugo Bergdahl	Liberal People's Party	Västmanlands län
Leif Bergdahl	New Democracy	Bohuslän
Inga Berggren	Moderate Party	Malmöhus län
Jan Bergqvist	Social Democrats	Göteborgs kommun
Harald Bergström	Christian Democrats	Kronobergs län
Bo Bernhardsson	Social Democrats	Fyrstadskretsen
Stig Bertilsson	Moderate Party	Älvsborgs läns norra
**Carl Bildt**	Moderate Party	Stockholms kommun
Knut Billing	Moderate Party	Stockholms län
Karl-Göran Biörsmark	Liberal People's Party	Östergötlands län
Britta Bjelle	Liberal People's Party	Norrbottens län
**Anders Björck**	Moderate Party	Jönköpings län
Gunnar Björk	Centre Party	Gävleborgs län
Ingvar Björk	Social Democrats	Östergötlands län
Ulf Björklund	Christian Democrats	Kopparbergs län
Jan Björkman	Social Democrats	Blekinge län
Lars Björkman	Moderate Party	Älvsborgs läns södra
Maud Björnemalm	Social Democrats	Örebro län
Britt Bohlin Olsson	Social Democrats	Älvsborgs läns norra
Görel Bohlin	Moderate Party	Stockholms län
Sinikka Bohlin	Social Democrats	Gävleborgs län
Gunhild Bolander	Centre Party	Gotlands län
Sigrid Bolkéus	Social Democrats	Gävleborgs län
Lena Boström	Social Democrats	Västerbottens län
John Bouvin	New Democracy	Stockholms län
Charlotte Branting	Liberal People's Party	Kronobergs län
Johan Brohult	New Democracy	Göteborgs kommun
Lennart Brunander	Centre Party	Älvsborgs läns södra
Lars Bäckström	Left Party	Bohuslän
Maja Bäckström	Social Democrats	Kristianstads län
Lisbet Calner	Social Democrats	Bohuslän
Leif Carlson	Moderate Party	Kalmar län
Birgitta Carlsson	Centre Party	Skaraborgs län
Inge Carlsson	Social Democrats	Östergötlands län
Ingvar Carlsson	Social Democrats	Stockholms län
Kent Carlsson	Social Democrats	Stockholms kommun
Roine Carlsson	Social Democrats	Värmlands län
Marianne Carlström	Social Democrats	Göteborgs kommun
Åke Carnerö	Christian Democrats	Bohuslän
Charlotte Cederschiöld	Moderate Party	Stockholms kommun
Rolf Clarkson	Moderate Party	Fyrstadskretsen
Harriet Colliander	New Democracy	Stockholms län
Birgitta Dahl	Social Democrats	Uppsala län
Rolf Dahlberg	Moderate Party	Gävleborgs län
Lennart Daléus	Centre Party	Stockholms län
Bengt Dalström	New Democracy	Hallands län
Bertil Danielsson	Moderate Party	Kalmar län
Hans Dau	Moderate Party	Västerbottens län
**Inger Davidson**	Christian Democrats	Stockholms län
Margitta Edgren	Liberal People's Party	Fyrstadskretsen
Alf Egnerfors	Social Democrats	Södermanlands län
Jerzy Einhorn	Christian Democrats	Stockholms kommun
Christer Eirefelt	Liberal People's Party	Hallands län
Berndt Ekholm	Social Democrats	Älvsborgs läns södra
Kjell Eldensjö	Christian Democrats	Älvsborgs läns södra
Stina Eliasson	Centre Party	Jämtlands län
Ingegerd Elm	Social Democrats	Jönköpings län
Odd Engström	Social Democrats	Kopparbergs län
Sture Ericson	Social Democrats	Örebro län
Dan Ericsson	Christian Democrats	Östergötlands län
Kjell Ericsson	Centre Party	Värmlands län
Berith Eriksson	Left Party	Uppsala län
Dan Eriksson	New Democracy	Stockholms kommun
Ingvar Eriksson	Moderate Party	Kristianstads län
Per-Ola Eriksson	Centre Party	Norrbottens län
Ulf Eriksson	New Democracy	Gävleborgs län
Gustaf von Essen	Moderate Party	Uppsala län
Rune Evensson	Social Democrats	Älvsborgs läns norra
Barbro Palmerlund	Social Democrats	Stockholms kommun
Lahja Exner	Social Democrats	Älvsborgs läns södra
Karin Falkmer	Moderate Party	Västmanlands län
Bo Finnkvist	Social Democrats	Värmlands län
Bertil Fiskesjö	Centre Party	Malmöhus län
Elisabeth Fleetwood	Moderate Party	Stockholms kommun
Bo Forslund	Social Democrats	Västernorrlands län
Hans Göran Franck	Social Democrats	Stockholms län
Bo Frank	Moderate Party	Kronobergs län
Jan Fransson	Social Democrats	Skaraborgs län
Ivar Franzén	Centre Party	Hallands län
Rose-Marie Frebran	Christian Democrats	Örebro län
Lennart Fremling	Liberal People's Party	Kopparbergs län
Lennart Fridén	Moderate Party	Göteborgs kommun
Filip Fridolfsson	Moderate Party	Stockholms kommun
**Birgit Friggebo**	Liberal People's Party	Stockholms kommun
Viola Furubjelke	Social Democrats	Östergötlands län
Reynoldh Furustrand	Social Democrats	Södermanlands län
Margareta Gard	Moderate Party	Kopparbergs län
Margit Gennser	Moderate Party	Fyrstadskretsen
Sigge Godin	Liberal People's Party	Västernorrlands län
Anita Gradin	Social Democrats	Stockholms kommun
Carl Fredrik Graf	Moderate Party	Hallands län
Pär Granstedt	Centre Party	Stockholms län
Stig Grauers	Moderate Party	Bohuslän
Nic Grönvall	Moderate Party	Hallands län
Hans Gustafsson	Social Democrats	Blekinge län
Holger Gustafsson	Christian Democrats	Skaraborgs län
Nils-Olof Gustafsson	Social Democrats	Jämtlands län
Stina Gustavsson	Centre Party	Kronobergs län
Åke Gustavsson	Social Democrats	Jönköpings län
Lars-Ove Hagberg	Left Party	Kopparbergs län
Ann-Cathrine Haglund	Moderate Party	Örebro län
Karl Hagström	Social Democrats	Gävleborgs län
Birger Hagård	Moderate Party	Östergötlands län
Isa Halvarsson	Liberal People's Party	Värmlands län
Birgitta Hambraeus	Centre Party	Kopparbergs län
Agne Hansson	Centre Party	Kalmar län
Bengt Harding Olson	Liberal People's Party	Kristianstads län
Lars Hedfors	Social Democrats	Kronobergs län
Ewa Hedkvist Petersen	Social Democrats	Norrbottens län
Hugo Hegeland	Moderate Party	Göteborgs kommun
Chris Heister	Moderate Party	Stockholms län
Mats Hellström	Social Democrats	Stockholms kommun
Ingrid Hemmingsson	Moderate Party	Jämtlands län
Birgit Henriksson	Moderate Party	Västmanlands län
Inger Hestvik	Social Democrats	Kopparbergs län
Tom Heyman	Moderate Party	Göteborgs kommun
Lena Hjelm-Wallén	Social Democrats	Västmanlands län
Bo Holmberg	Social Democrats	Västernorrlands län
Håkan Holmberg	Liberal People's Party	Uppsala län
Bengt Hurtig	Left Party	Norrbottens län
Per Olof Håkansson	Social Democrats	Malmöhus län
Doris Håvik	Social Democrats	Göteborgs kommun
Göran Hägglund	Christian Democrats	Jönköpings län
Anders G. Högmark	Moderate Party	Kronobergs län
Gunnar Hökmark	Moderate Party	Stockholms län
**Börje Hörnlund**	Centre Party	Västerbottens län
Margareta Israelsson	Social Democrats	Västmanlands län
Laila Jansson	New Democracy	Älvsborgs läns norra
Bo G. Jenevall	New Democracy	Stockholms kommun
Jan Jennehag	Left Party	Västernorrlands län
Anita Johansson	Social Democrats	Stockholms län
Birgitta Johansson	Social Democrats	Skaraborgs län
Eva Johansson	Social Democrats	Stockholms län
Inga-Britt Johansson	Social Democrats	Göteborgs kommun
Kjell Johansson	Liberal People's Party	Södermanlands län
Kurt Ove Johansson	Social Democrats	Fyrstadskretsen
Larz Johansson	Centre Party	Södermanlands län
**Olof Johansson**	Centre Party	Stockholms kommun
Ingvar Johnsson	Social Democrats	Älvsborgs läns norra
Elver Jonsson	Liberal People's Party	Älvsborgs läns norra
Göte Jonsson	Moderate Party	Jönköpings län
Robert Jousma	New Democracy	Uppsala län
Henrik S. Järrel	Moderate Party	Stockholms kommun
Anita Jönsson	Social Democrats	Malmöhus län
Marianne Jönsson	Centre Party	Kalmar län
Björn Kaaling	Social Democrats	Uppsala län
Bert Karlsson	New Democracy	Östergötlands län
Hans Karlsson	Social Democrats	Örebro län
Rinaldo Karlsson	Social Democrats	Västerbottens län
Sonia Karlsson	Social Democrats	Östergötlands län
Stefan Kihlberg	New Democracy	Kopparbergs län
Bengt Kindbom	Centre Party	Skaraborgs län
Arne Kjörnsberg	Social Democrats	Älvsborgs läns södra
Lena Klevenås	Social Democrats	Älvsborgs läns norra
Peter Kling	New Democracy	Fyrstadskretsen
Maj-Inger Klingvall	Social Democrats	Östergötlands län
Göthe Knutson	Moderate Party	Värmlands län
Inger Koch	Moderate Party	Stockholms län
Wiggo Komstedt	Moderate Party	Kristianstads län
Bengt Kronblad	Social Democrats	Kalmar län
**Bo Könberg**	Liberal People's Party	Stockholms kommuns valkrets
Henrik Landerholm	Moderate Party	Södermanlands län
Kenneth Lantz	Christian Democrats	Fyrstadskretsen
Allan Larsson	Social Democrats	Jönköpings län
Kaj Larsson	Social Democrats	Kristianstads län
Roland Larsson	Centre Party	Östergötlands län
Torgny Larsson	Social Democrats	Göteborgs kommun
Roland Lében	Christian Democrats	Värmlands län
Lars Leijonborg	Liberal People's Party	Stockholms län
Sören Lekberg	Social Democrats	Stockholms län
Göran Lennmarker	Moderate Party	Stockholms län
Mats Lindberg	Social Democrats	Västerbottens län
Gullan Lindblad	Moderate Party	Värmlands län
Hans Lindblad	Liberal People's Party	Gävleborgs län
Christer Lindblom	Liberal People's Party	Kalmar län
Oskar Lindkvist	Social Democrats	Stockholms kommun
Olle Lindström	Moderate Party	Norrbottens län
Carin Lundberg	Social Democrats	Västerbottens län
Inger Lundberg	Social Democrats	Örebro län
Sven Lundberg	Social Democrats	Västernorrlands län
**Bo Lundgren**	Moderate Party	Kristianstads län
Pehr Löfgreen	Moderate Party	Östergötlands län
Berit Löfstedt	Social Democrats	Östergötlands län
Ulf Lönnqvist	Social Democrats	Stockholms län
Johan Lönnroth	Left Party	Göteborgs kommun
Lars-Erik Lövdén	Social Democrats	Fyrstadskretsen
Maj-Lis Lööw	Social Democrats	Södermanlands län
Göran Magnusson	Social Democrats	Västmanlands län
Leif Marklund	Social Democrats	Norrbottens län
Jerry Martinger	Moderate Party	Stockholms län
Ulrica Messing	Social Democrats	Gävleborgs län
Anita Modin	Social Democrats	Stockholms kommun
Per-Richard Molén	Moderate Party	Västernorrlands län
Max Montalvo	New Democracy	Västmanlands län
Lars Moquist	New Democracy	Skaraborgs län
Bertil Måbrink	Left Party	Gävleborgs län
Ingela Mårtensson	Liberal People's Party	Göteborgs kommun
Rolf L. Nilson	Left Party	Fyrstadskretsen
Anders Nilsson	Social Democrats	Skaraborgs län
Bo Nilsson	Social Democrats	Fyrstadskretsen
Börje Nilsson	Social Democrats	Kristianstads län
Carl G. Nilsson	Moderate Party	Östergötlands län
Gunnar Nilsson	Social Democrats	Malmöhus län
Kjell Nilsson	Social Democrats	Kronobergs län
Lennart Nilsson	Social Democrats	Bohuslän
Gudrun Norberg	Liberal People's Party	Örebro län
Nils Nordh	Social Democrats	Jönköpings län
Patrik Norinder	Moderate Party	Gävleborgs län
Hans Nyhage	Moderate Party	Älvsborgs läns södra
Ingrid Näslund	Christian Democrats	Göteborgs kommun
**Mats Odell**	Christian Democrats	Stockholms län
Mikael Odenberg	Moderate Party	Stockholms kommun
**Karl Erik Olsson**	Centre Party	Kristianstads län
Kent Olsson	Moderate Party	Bohuslän
Ulla Orring	Liberal People's Party	Västerbottens län
Berit Oscarsson	Social Democrats	Västmanlands län
Sverre Palm	Social Democrats	Bohuslän
Anita Persson	Social Democrats	Södermanlands län
Bertil Persson	Moderate Party	Fyrstadskretsen
Carl Olov Persson	Christian Democrats	Västmanlands län
Elisabeth Persson	Left Party	Östergötlands län
Göran Persson	Social Democrats	Södermanlands län
Karl-Erik Persson	Left Party	Örebro län
Leo Persson	Social Democrats	Kopparbergs län
Magnus Persson	Social Democrats	Värmlands län
My Persson	Moderate Party	Göteborgs kommun
Siw Persson	Liberal People's Party	Malmöhus län
Thage G. Peterson	Social Democrats	Stockholms län
Sven-Olof Petersson	Centre Party	Blekinge län
Ulla Pettersson	Social Democrats	Gotlands län
Bruno Poromaa	Social Democrats	Norrbottens län
Chatrine Pålsson Ahlgren	Christian Democrats	Kalmar län
Fredrik Reinfeldt	Moderate Party	Stockholms län
Sonja Rembo	Moderate Party	Göteborgs kommun
Inger René	Moderate Party	Bohuslän
Anne Rhenman	New Democracy	Södermanlands län
Stig Rindborg	Moderate Party	Stockholms län
Fanny Rizell	Christian Democrats	Älvsborgs läns norra
Bengt Rosén	Liberal People's Party	Skaraborgs län
Birger Rosqvist	Social Democrats	Kalmar län
Liisa Rulander	Christian Democrats	Södermanlands län
Rune Rydén	Moderate Party	Fyrstadskretsen
Bengt-Ola Ryttar	Social Democrats	Kopparbergs län
Catarina Rönnung	Social Democrats	Jönköpings län
Mona Sahlin	Social Democrats	Stockholms län
Ingegerd Sahlström	Social Democrats	Hallands län
Mona Saint Cyr	Moderate Party	Östergötlands län
Björn Samuelson	Left Party	Värmlands län
Jan Sandberg	Moderate Party	Stockholms län
Yvonne Sandberg-Fries	Social Democrats	Blekinge län
Olle Schmidt	Liberal People's Party	Fyrstadskretsen
Pierre Schori	Social Democrats	Stockholms län
Gudrun Schyman	Left Party	Stockholms län
Åke Selberg	Social Democrats	Norrbottens län
Sven-Gösta Signell	Social Democrats	Skaraborgs län
Bengt Silfverstrand	Social Democrats	Malmöhus län
Karl Gustaf Sjödin	New Democracy	Västernorrlands län
Christer Skoog	Social Democrats	Blekinge län
Tuve Skånberg	Christian Democrats	Kristianstads län
Kenth Skårvik	Liberal People's Party	Bohuslän
Harry Staaf	Christian Democrats	Hallands län
Lisbeth Staaf-Igelström	Social Democrats	Värmlands län
Hans Stenberg	Social Democrats	Västernorrlands län
Per Stenmarck	Moderate Party	Malmöhus län
Lars Stjernkvist	Social Democrats	Östergötlands län
Håkan Strömberg	Social Democrats	Örebro län
Roland Sundgren	Social Democrats	Västmanlands län
Britta Sundin	Social Democrats	Västernorrlands län
Lars Sundin	Liberal People's Party	Älvsborgs läns södra
Sten-Ove Sundström	Social Democrats	Norrbottens län
Karl-Erik Svartberg	Social Democrats	Bohuslän
Lars Svensk	Christian Democrats	Uppsala län
Karl-Gösta Svenson	Moderate Party	Blekinge län
**Alf Svensson**	Christian Democrats	Jönköpings län
Kristina Svensson	Social Democrats	Värmlands län
Nils T. Svensson	Social Democrats	Fyrstadskretsen
Sten Svensson	Moderate Party	Skaraborgs län
Anders Svärd	Centre Party	Örebro län
Sten Söderberg	New Democracy	Kronobergs län
Elvy Söderström	Social Democrats	Västernorrlands län
Birthe Sörestedt	Social Democrats	Fyrstadskretsen
Daniel Tarschys	Liberal People's Party	Stockholms län
Ingela Thalén	Social Democrats	Stockholms län
Maj Britt Theorin	Social Democrats	Stockholms kommun
Gunnar Thollander	Social Democrats	Uppsala län
Rune Thorén	Centre Party	Göteborgs kommun
**Görel Thurdin**	Centre Party	Västernorrlands län
Lars Tobisson	Moderate Party	Stockholms län
Ingegerd Troedsson	Moderate Party	Uppsala län
**Margaretha af Ugglas**	Moderate Party	Stockholms kommun
Richard Ulfvengren	New Democracy	Jönköpings län
Ines Uusmann	Social Democrats	Stockholms län
Ian Wachtmeister	New Democracy	Stockholms län
Knut Wachtmeister	Moderate Party	Malmöhus län
Karin Wegestål	Social Democrats	Malmöhus län
Alf Wennerfors	Moderate Party	Stockholms län
Alwa Wennerlund	Christian Democrats	Malmöhus län
Lars Werner	Left Party	Stockholms kommun
**Bengt Westerberg**	Liberal People's Party	Stockholms län
**Per Westerberg**	Moderate Party	Södermanlands län
Barbro Westerholm	Liberal People's Party	Stockholms kommun
Iréne Vestlund	Social Democrats	Kopparbergs län
**Anne Wibble**	Liberal People's Party	Stockholms län
Monica Widnemark	Social Democrats	Kronobergs län
Jon Peter Wieselgren	New Democracy	Värmlands län
Pontus Wiklund	Christian Democrats	Gävleborgs län
Jan-Erik Wikström	Liberal People's Party	Stockholms kommun
Carl-Johan Wilson	Liberal People's Party	Jönköpings län
Margareta Winberg	Social Democrats	Jämtlands län
Christer Windén	New Democracy	Kalmar län
Ivar Virgin	Moderate Party	Skaraborgs län
Birgitta Wistrand	Moderate Party	Stockholms kommun
Bengt Wittbom	Moderate Party	Örebro län
Liselotte Wågö	Moderate Party	Hallands län
Claus Zaar	New Democracy	Malmöhus län
Eva Zetterberg	Left Party	Stockholms kommun
Ulla-Britt Åbark	Social Democrats	Hallands län
Jan Erik Ågren	Christian Democrats	Västernorrlands län
Annika Åhnberg	Left Party	Stockholms län
Göran Åstrand	Moderate Party	Stockholms kommun
Monica Öhman	Social Democrats	Norrbottens län
Lena Öhrsvik	Social Democrats	Kalmar län
Rosa Östh	Centre Party	Uppsala län
Sten Östlund	Social Democrats	Göteborgs kommun
