= Fyrstadskretsen (Riksdag constituency) =

Swedish electoral district

- Four City Constituency
- Former constituency for the Riksdag
- Municipality: List: Helsingborg; Landskrona; Lund; Malmö
- County: Malmöhus
- Electorate: 351,347 (1991)

Former constituency
- Created: 1970
- Abolished: 1994
- Seats: List (Note: Constituency seats only.): 17 (1979–1994)); 18 (1970–1979)
- Created from: Fyrstadskretsen
- Replaced by: List: Malmö; Malmöhus County North; Malmöhus County South

Fyrstadskretsen (lit. 'Four City Constituency'), officially known as Malmö, Hälsingborg, Landskrona and Lund until 1970, was a multi-member constituency of the Riksdag, the national legislature of Sweden. The constituency was established in 1970 when the Riksdag changed from a bicameral legislature to a unicameral legislature. It consisted of the non-contiguous municipalities of Helsingborg, Landskrona, Lund and Malmö in the county of Malmöhus. It was abolished in 1994 following the reorganisation of the constituencies in Malmöhus County. Helsingborg and Landskrona were transferred to the newly created Malmöhus County North constituency, Lund was transferred to Malmöhus County South and Malmö became a constituency in its own right.

== Electoral system ==
Fyrstadskretsen elected members of the Riksdag using the open party-list proportional representation electoral system. Constituency seats were allocated using the modified Sainte-Laguë method. Only parties that reached the 4% national threshold and parties that received at least 12% of the vote in the constituency competed for constituency seats. Supplementary levelling seats may also have been allocated at the constituency level to parties that reached the 4% national threshold.

Voters could cast any ballot paper they wanted though it had to contain the name of a party and the name of at least one candidate nominated by that party in the constituency. It was common for parties to hand out ballot papers with their name and list of candidates at the entrance of polling stations. Voters could delete the names of candidates or write-in the names of other candidates but in practice these options weren't used enough by voters to have any significant impact on the results and consequently elections operated as a closed system.

Seats won by each party/list in a constituency were allocated to its candidates in order of preference votes (a personal mandate), provided that the candidate had received at least 8% of votes cast for their party in the constituency. Any unfilled seats were then allocated to the party's remaining candidates in the order they appeared on the party list (a party mandate).

== Election results ==
=== Summary ===
Election	Left V / VPK			Social Democrats S			Greens MP			Centre C			Liberals FP / F			Moderates M			Christian Democrats KDS		
Election	Votes	%	Seats	Votes	%	Seats	Votes	%	Seats	Votes	%	Seats	Votes	%	Seats	Votes	%	Seats	Votes	%	Seats
1991	10,557	3.56%	0	109,133	36.81%	7	10,762	3.63%	0	9,845	3.32%	0	26,512	8.94%	2	89,308	30.12%	6	15,768	5.32%	1
1988	13,936	4.71%	1	129,795	43.90%	8	19,362	6.55%	1	13,826	4.68%	1	34,258	11.59%	2	73,842	24.97%	4	4,208	1.42%	0
1985	13,590	4.45%	1	136,922	44.83%	8	5,257	1.72%	0	15,174	4.97%	1	45,312	14.84%	2	86,749	28.41%	5	with C		
1982	14,601	4.76%	1	145,847	47.57%	9	5,449	1.78%	0	24,863	8.11%	1	18,323	5.98%	1	93,930	30.63%	5	2,393	0.78%	0
1979	14,102	4.63%	1	137,848	45.24%	8				27,240	8.94%	1	35,965	11.80%	2	84,573	27.75%	5	1,492	0.49%	0
1976	11,736	3.80%	1	141,723	45.86%	8				49,529	16.03%	3	36,344	11.76%	2	66,625	21.56%	4	1,877	0.61%	0
1973	11,803	3.91%	1	144,083	47.71%	9				62,040	20.54%	4	22,853	7.57%	1	57,611	19.07%	3	2,117	0.70%	0
1970	8,891	3.10%	0	144,317	50.26%	10				36,744	12.80%	2	49,218	17.14%	3	44,650	15.55%	3	2,372	0.83%	0

(Excludes levelling seats. Figures in italics represent alliances/joint lists.)

=== Detailed ===
Party has received at least 4% of the vote nationally and is entitled to compete for constituency seats.

==== 1990s ====
===== 1991 =====
Results of the 1991 general election held on 15 September 1991:

Party		Votes per municipality				Total votes	%	Seats		
Party		Helsing- borg	Lands- krona	Lund	Malmö	Total votes	%	Con.	Lev.	Tot.
Swedish Social Democratic Party	S	24,783	10,368	16,182	57,800	109,133	36.81%	7	0	7
Moderate Party	M	19,397	6,017	15,918	47,976	89,308	30.12%	6	0	6
Liberal People's Party	FP	6,174	1,508	7,819	11,011	26,512	8.94%	2	0	2
New Democracy	NyD	4,999	1,365	2,430	8,751	17,545	5.92%	1	0	1
Christian Democratic Unity	KDS	4,944	953	3,044	6,827	15,768	5.32%	1	0	1
Green Party	MP	1,994	465	3,910	4,393	10,762	3.63%	0	0	0
Left Party	V	1,982	681	3,034	4,860	10,557	3.56%	0	1	1
Centre Party	C	2,716	1,003	2,859	3,267	9,845	3.32%	0	1	1
Other parties		2,209	552	1,034	3,256	7,051	2.38%	0	0	0
Valid votes		69,198	22,912	56,230	148,141	296,481	100.00%	17	2	19
Rejected votes		1,276	382	1,221	2,914	5,793	1.92%			
Total polled		70,474	23,294	57,451	151,055	302,274	86.03%			
Registered electors		82,866	27,124	63,987	177,370	351,347				
Turnout		85.05%	85.88%	89.79%	85.16%	86.03%				

The following candidates were elected: Jan Andersson (S); Sten Andersson (M); Jan Backman (M); Bo Bernhardsson (S); Rolf Clarkson (M); Margitta Edgren (FP); Margit Gennser (M); Kurt Ove Johansson (S); Peter Kling (NyD); Kenneth Lantz (KDS); Lars-Erik Lövdén (S); Bo Nilsson (S); Rolf L. Nilson (V); Bertil Persson (M); Rune Rydén (M); Olle Schmidt (FP); Birthe Sörestedt (S); Nils T. Svensson (S); and Ulla Tillander (C).

==== 1980s ====
===== 1988 =====
Results of the 1988 general election held on 18 September 1988:

Party		Votes per municipality				Total votes	%	Seats		
Party		Helsing- borg	Lands- krona	Lund	Malmö	Total votes	%	Con.	Lev.	Tot.
Swedish Social Democratic Party	S	29,929	11,997	18,347	69,522	129,795	43.90%	8	1	9
Moderate Party	M	15,675	4,993	12,684	40,490	73,842	24.97%	4	1	5
Liberal People's Party	FP	8,839	2,077	7,985	15,357	34,258	11.59%	2	0	2
Green Party	MP	4,498	1,132	5,647	8,085	19,362	6.55%	1	1	2
Left Party – Communists	VPK	2,714	847	3,969	6,406	13,936	4.71%	1	0	1
Centre Party	C	3,988	1,193	3,737	4,908	13,826	4.68%	1	0	1
Christian Democratic Unity	KDS	1,163	206	802	2,037	4,208	1.42%	0	0	0
Other parties		1,069	208	537	4,634	6,448	2.18%	0	0	0
Valid votes		67,875	22,653	53,708	151,439	295,675	100.00%	17	3	20
Rejected votes		1,055	298	923	2,139	4,415	1.47%			
Total polled		68,930	22,951	54,631	153,578	300,090	85.97%			
Registered electors		81,806	26,684	61,584	179,006	349,080				
Turnout		84.26%	86.01%	88.71%	85.79%	85.97%				

The following candidates were elected: Karin Ahrland (FP); Ingegerd Anderlund (S); Jan Andersson (S); Sten Andersson (M); Rolf Clarkson (M); Kjell Dahlström (MP); Margit Gennser (M); Kurt Ove Johansson (S); Lars-Erik Lövdén (S); Grethe Lundblad (S); Bo Nilsson (S); Rolf L. Nilson (VPK); Bertil Persson (M); Lennart Pettersson (S); Rune Rydén (M); Birthe Sörestedt (S); Anita Stenberg (MP); Nils T. Svensson (S); Ulla Tillander (C); and Kjell-Arne Welin (FP).

Permanent substitutions:

- Karin Ahrland (FP) resigned on 29 September 1989 and was replaced by Margitta Edgren (FP) on 30 September 1989.

===== 1985 =====
Results of the 1985 general election held on 15 September 1985:

Party		Votes per municipality				Total votes	%	Seats		
Party		Helsing- borg	Lands- krona	Lund	Malmö	Total votes	%	Con.	Lev.	Tot.
Swedish Social Democratic Party	S	30,851	13,052	19,971	73,048	136,922	44.83%	8	1	9
Moderate Party	M	19,811	5,798	14,872	46,268	86,749	28.41%	5	1	6
Liberal People's Party	FP	11,321	2,502	9,210	22,279	45,312	14.84%	2	1	3
Centre Party	C	4,260	1,258	4,141	5,515	15,174	4.97%	1	0	1
Left Party – Communists	VPK	2,606	796	3,917	6,271	13,590	4.45%	1	0	1
Green Party	MP	1,166	293	1,652	2,146	5,257	1.72%	0	0	0
Other parties		317	59	202	1,817	2,395	0.78%	0	0	0
Valid votes		70,332	23,758	53,965	157,344	305,399	100.00%	17	3	20
Rejected votes		749	190	635	1,542	3,116	1.01%			
Total polled		71,081	23,948	54,600	158,886	308,515	89.57%			
Registered electors		79,996	26,604	59,422	178,413	344,435				
Turnout		88.86%	90.02%	91.89%	89.06%	89.57%				

The following candidates were elected: Karin Ahrland (FP); Ingegerd Anderlund (S); Sten Andersson (M); Olle Aulin (M); Rolf Clarkson (M); Margitta Edgren (FP); Margit Gennser (M); Kurt Ove Johansson (S); Lars-Erik Lövdén (S); Grethe Lundblad (S); Sven Munke (M); Bo Nilsson (S); Hans Pettersson (S); Lennart Pettersson (S); Rune Rydén (M); Birthe Sörestedt (S); Jörn Svensson (VPK); Nils T. Svensson (S); Ulla Tillander (C); and Kjell-Arne Welin (FP).

===== 1982 =====
Results of the 1982 general election held on 19 September 1982:

Party		Votes per municipality				Total votes	%	Seats		
Party		Helsing- borg	Lands- krona	Lund	Malmö	Total votes	%	Con.	Lev.	Tot.
Swedish Social Democratic Party	S	32,203	13,661	19,837	80,146	145,847	47.57%	9	0	9
Moderate Party	M	21,259	6,183	16,169	50,319	93,930	30.63%	5	1	6
Centre Party	C	7,019	1,902	5,942	10,000	24,863	8.11%	1	1	2
Liberal People's Party	FP	4,004	1,180	4,148	8,991	18,323	5.98%	1	0	1
Left Party – Communists	VPK	2,671	829	4,311	6,790	14,601	4.76%	1	0	1
Green Party	MP	1,292	309	1,719	2,129	5,449	1.78%	0	0	0
Christian Democratic Unity	KDS	736	110	397	1,150	2,393	0.78%	0	0	0
K-Party	K-P	101	25	43	207	376	0.12%	0	0	0
Other parties		146	46	111	526	829	0.27%	0	0	0
Valid votes		69,431	24,245	52,677	160,258	306,611	100.00%	17	2	19
Rejected votes		685	198	677	1,602	3,162	1.02%			
Total polled		70,116	24,443	53,354	161,860	309,773	91.23%			
Registered electors		77,280	26,568	57,293	178,396	339,537				
Turnout		90.73%	92.00%	93.12%	90.73%	91.23%				

The following candidates were elected: Karin Ahrland (FP); Olle Aulin (M); Rolf Clarkson (M); Margit Gennser (M); Kurt Ove Johansson (S); Eric Jönsson (S); Lars-Erik Lövdén (S); Grethe Lundblad (S); Sven Munke (M); Bo Nilsson (S); Joakim Ollén (M); Sigvard Persson (C); Hans Pettersson (S); Lennart Pettersson (S); Rune Rydén (M); Birthe Sörestedt (S); Jörn Svensson (VPK); Nils T. Svensson (S); and Ulla Tillander (C).

Permanent substitutions:

- Joakim Ollén (M) resigned on 30 May 1983 and was replaced by Sten Andersson (M) on 31 May 1983.
- Eric Jönsson (S) died on 29 March 1985 and was replaced by Staffan Vallin (S) on 2 April 1985.
- Staffan Vallin (S) resigned on 9 April 1985 and was replaced by Elvy Westerberg (S) on 11 April 1985.

==== 1970s ====
===== 1979 =====
Results of the 1979 general election held on 16 September 1979:

Party		Votes per municipality				Total votes	%	Seats		
Party		Helsing- borg	Lands- krona	Lund	Malmö	Total votes	%	Con.	Lev.	Tot.
Swedish Social Democratic Party	S	29,848	13,270	18,848	75,882	137,848	45.24%	8	1	9
Moderate Party	M	18,929	5,518	13,410	46,716	84,573	27.75%	5	1	6
Liberal People's Party	FP	7,901	2,349	7,089	18,626	35,965	11.80%	2	1	3
Centre Party	C	7,479	2,129	6,539	11,093	27,240	8.94%	1	1	2
Left Party – Communists	VPK	2,344	677	4,674	6,407	14,102	4.63%	1	0	1
Christian Democratic Unity	KDS	432	117	247	696	1,492	0.49%	0	0	0
Workers' Party – The Communists	APK	117	46	59	453	675	0.22%	0	0	0
Communist Party of Sweden	SKP	84	9	102	230	425	0.14%	0	0	0
Other parties		586	191	360	1,280	2,417	0.79%	0	0	0
Valid votes		67,720	24,306	51,328	161,383	304,737	100.00%	17	4	21
Rejected votes		426	120	442	1,050	2,038	0.66%			
Total polled		68,146	24,426	51,770	162,433	306,775	90.64%			
Registered electors		75,395	26,762	56,084	180,204	338,445				
Turnout		90.39%	91.27%	92.31%	90.14%	90.64%				

The following candidates were elected: Karin Ahrland (FP); Olle Aulin (M); Hugo Bengtsson (S); Erik Börjesson (FP); Rolf Clarkson (M); Bertil Fiskesjö (C); Per Gahrton (FP); Eric Holmqvist (S); Kurt Ove Johansson (S); Eric Jönsson (S); Grethe Lundblad (S); Sven Munke (M); Joakim Ollén (M); Arne Pettersson (S); Hans Pettersson (S); Lennart Pettersson (S); Rune Rydén (M); Anna-Greta Skantz (S); Jörn Svensson (VPK); Ulla Tillander (C); and Mårten Werner (M).

Permanent substitutions:

- Per Gahrton (FP) resigned on 11 November 1979 and was replaced by Åke Persson (FP) on 12 November 1979.
- Arne Pettersson (S) resigned on 9 January 1980 and was replaced by Lars-Erik Lövdén (S) on 10 January 1980.

===== 1976 =====
Results of the 1976 general election held on 19 September 1976:

Party		Votes per municipality				Total votes	%	Seats		
Party		Helsing- borg	Lands- krona	Lund	Malmö	Total votes	%	Con.	Lev.	Tot.
Swedish Social Democratic Party	S	30,488	13,776	18,943	78,516	141,723	45.86%	8	1	9
Moderate Party	M	14,645	4,115	10,332	37,533	66,625	21.56%	4	0	4
Centre Party	C	12,704	3,847	10,109	22,869	49,529	16.03%	3	0	3
People's Party	F	7,616	2,348	7,103	19,277	36,344	11.76%	2	0	2
Left Party – Communists	VPK	1,966	560	3,882	5,328	11,736	3.80%	1	0	1
Christian Democratic Unity	KDS	503	189	279	906	1,877	0.61%	0	0	0
Communist Party of Sweden	SKP	150	15	205	366	736	0.24%	0	0	0
Other parties		29	49	81	298	457	0.15%	0	0	0
Valid votes		68,101	24,899	50,934	165,093	309,027	100.00%	18	1	19
Rejected votes		288	71	318	866	1,543	0.50%			
Total polled		68,389	24,970	51,252	165,959	310,570	91.92%			
Registered electors		74,589	27,070	54,855	181,356	337,870				
Turnout		91.69%	92.24%	93.43%	91.51%	91.92%				

The following candidates were elected: Erik Adamsson (S); Olle Aulin (M); Hugo Bengtsson (S); Britta Bergström (F); Rolf Clarkson (M); Bertil Fiskesjö (C); Per Gahrton (F); Alfred Håkansson (C); Eric Holmqvist (S); Eric Jönsson (S); Grethe Lundblad (S); Joakim Ollén (M); Arne Pettersson (S); Hans Pettersson (S); Lennart Pettersson (S); Rune Rydén (M); Anna-Greta Skantz (S); Jörn Svensson (VPK); and Ulla Tillander (C).

===== 1973 =====
Results of the 1973 general election held on 16 September 1973:

Party		Votes per municipality				Total votes	%	Seats		
Party		Helsing- borg	Lands- krona	Lund	Malmö	Total votes	%	Con.	Lev.	Tot.
Swedish Social Democratic Party	S	30,031	14,009	18,655	81,388	144,083	47.71%	9	1	10
Centre Party	C	13,572	4,468	11,648	32,352	62,040	20.54%	4	0	4
Moderate Party	M	13,021	3,304	9,383	31,903	57,611	19.07%	3	1	4
People's Party	F	5,314	1,574	3,999	11,966	22,853	7.57%	1	1	2
Left Party – Communists	VPK	2,275	586	3,052	5,890	11,803	3.91%	1	0	1
Christian Democratic Unity	KDS	645	198	326	948	2,117	0.70%	0	0	0
Communist Party of Sweden	SKP	125	22	192	387	726	0.24%	0	0	0
Communist League Marxist–Leninists (the revolutionaries)	KFML(r)	170	33	95	322	620	0.21%	0	0	0
Other parties		27	2	19	126	174	0.06%	0	0	0
Valid votes		65,180	24,196	47,369	165,282	302,027	100.00%	18	3	21
Rejected votes		179	81	208	608	1,076	0.35%			
Total polled		65,359	24,277	47,577	165,890	303,103	91.15%			
Registered electors		72,061	26,355	51,380	182,722	332,518				
Turnout		90.70%	92.12%	92.60%	90.79%	91.15%				

The following candidates were elected: Erik Adamsson (S); Hugo Bengtsson (S); Rolf Clarkson (M); Bertil Fiskesjö (C); Alfred Håkansson (C); Eric Holmqvist (S); Ulla Jacobsson (M); Kurt Ove Johansson (S); Eric Jönsson (S); Sigfrid Löfgren (F); Grethe Lundblad (S); Alma Olsson (C); Arne Pettersson (S); Hans Pettersson (S); Lennart Pettersson (S); C. G. Regnéll (M); Sten Sjöholm (F); Anna-Greta Skantz (S); Jörn Svensson (VPK); Ulla Tillander (C); and Mårten Werner (M).

===== 1970 =====
Results of the 1970 general election held on 20 September 1970:

Party		Votes per municipality					Total votes	%	Seats		
Party		Helsing- borg	Lands- krona	Lund	Malmö	Postal votes	Total votes	%	Con.	Lev.	Tot.
Swedish Social Democratic Party	S	27,309	11,957	13,603	77,229	14,219	144,317	50.26%	10	0	10
People's Party	F	8,876	2,316	5,250	23,180	9,596	49,218	17.14%	3	1	4
Moderate Party	M	7,702	1,808	4,341	20,371	10,428	44,650	15.55%	3	0	3
Centre Party	C	7,652	2,019	4,274	17,977	4,822	36,744	12.80%	2	1	3
Left Party – Communists	VPK	1,842	346	987	4,619	1,097	8,891	3.10%	0	1	1
Christian Democratic Unity	KDS	514	206	238	961	453	2,372	0.83%	0	0	0
Communist League Marxists-Leninists	KFML	119	31	159	220	207	736	0.26%	0	0	0
Other parties		1	0	3	136	79	219	0.08%	0	0	0
Valid votes		54,015	18,683	28,855	144,693	40,901	287,147	100.00%	18	3	21
Rejected votes		108	26	72	350	285	841	0.29%			
Total polled exc. postal votes		54,123	18,709	28,927	145,043	41,186	287,988				
Postal votes		9,891	2,807	6,648	21,685	-41,186	-155				
Total polled inc. postal votes		64,014	21,516	35,575	166,728	0	287,833	89.09%			
Registered electors		72,079	23,948	39,351	187,686		323,064				
Turnout		88.81%	89.84%	90.40%	88.83%		89.09%				

The following candidates were elected: Erik Adamsson (S); Hugo Bengtsson (S); Britta Bergström (F); Rolf Clarkson (M); Bertil Fiskesjö (C); Alfred Håkansson (C); Einar Henningsson (S); Eric Holmqvist (S); Eric Jönsson (S); Karl-Axel Levin (F); Sigfrid Löfgren (F); Grethe Lundblad (S); Alma Olsson (C); Alf Pettersson (S); Arne Pettersson (S); Lennart Pettersson (S); C. G. Regnéll (M); Sten Sjöholm (F); Anna-Greta Skantz (S); Jörn Svensson (VPK); and Mårten Werner (M).
