= Fyrstadskretsen =

Fyrstadskretsen may refer to:

- Fyrstadskretsen (Andra kammaren constituency), constituency for the Andra kammaren, the lower chamber of the bicameral Riksdag, from 1921 to 1970
- Fyrstadskretsen (Riksdag constituency), constituency for the unicameral Riksdag, from 1970 to 1994
