= Rindborg =

Rindborg is a Swedish surname. Notable people with the surname include:

- Ingvar Rindborg (1931–2016), Swedish banker, brother of Stig
- Stig Rindborg (1929–2018), Swedish politician and lawyer
