= 1973 Swedish general election =

← 1970	16 September 1973	1976 →

All 350 seats in the Riksdag 176 seats needed for a majority
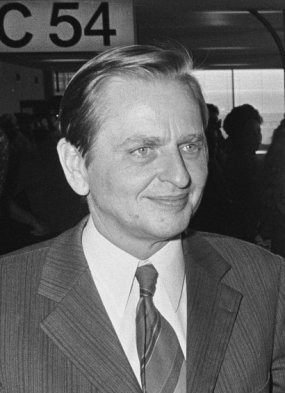

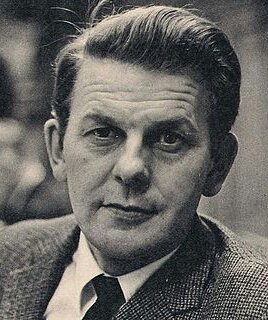

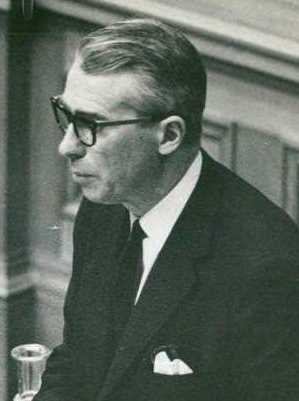

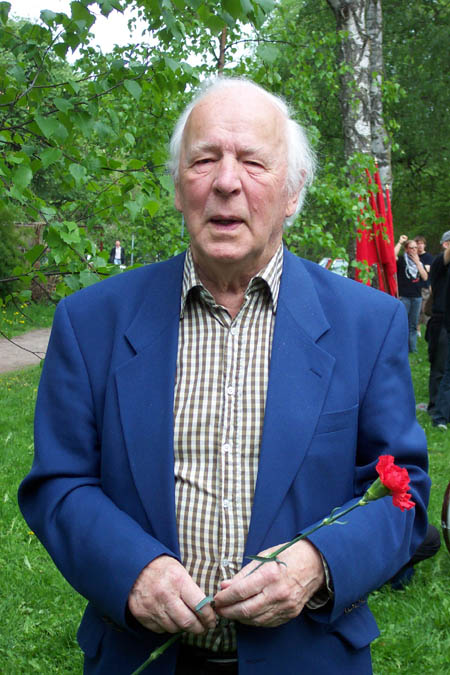
	First party	Second party	Third party
Leader	Olof Palme	Thorbjörn Fälldin	Gösta Bohman
Party	Social Democrats	Centre	Moderate
Last election	163	71	41
Seats won	156	90	51
Seat change	▼7	▲19	▲10
Popular vote	2,247,727	1,295,246	737,584
Percentage	43.56%	25.10%	14.29%
Swing	▼1.78 pp	▲5.18 pp	▲2.76 pp
	Fourth party	Fifth party
Leader	Gunnar Helén	C.-H. Hermansson
Party	People's Party	Left Communists
Last election	58	17
Seats won	34	19
Seat change	▼24	▲2
Popular vote	486,028	274,929
Percentage	9.42%	5.33%
Swing	▼6.79 pp	▲0.57 pp
- Map of the election, showing the distribution of constituency and levelling seats, as well as the largest political bloc within each constituency.
PM before election
Olof Palme
Social Democrats
Elected PM
Olof Palme
Social Democrats

General elections were held in Sweden on 16 September 1973. The Social Democrats remained the largest party, winning 156 of the 350 seats.

For most of the campaign, the opposition parties had led the socialist parties in the polls. It has been speculated that several events influenced the outcome of the election in favour of the government: the death of King Gustaf VI Adolf the previous day, the Norrmalmstorg robbery and the 1973 Chilean coup d'état. Prime Minister Olof Palme had delivered an impassioned speech on Salvador Allende's legacy on the eve of the election, in which he praised the democratic system.

The elections instead produced a draw, with the socialist and liberal-conservative blocs each winning 175 seats. Since the opposition could not pass a motion of no confidence against Palme's government, he was able to remain in power. In order to pass legislation the Social Democrats had to draw lots or seek support from the opposition. To prevent this scenario from reoccurring, the number of seats in the Riksdag was adjusted to an odd number for subsequent elections. In the popular vote, while winning an equal number of seats the socialist bloc won 2,522,656 votes to the 2,518,858 for the liberal-conservative bloc, a net difference of 3,798 votes or 48.80% versus 48.73%, although the seats ended up being shared equally because of the narrow margin.

== Results ==
Party	Votes	%	Seats	+/–
Swedish Social Democratic Party	2,247,727	43.56	156	–7
Centre Party	1,295,246	25.10	90	+19
Moderate Party	737,584	14.29	51	+10
People's Party	486,028	9.42	34	–24
Left Party Communists	274,929	5.33	19	+2
Christian Democratic Unity	90,388	1.75	0	0
Communist Party	18,923	0.37	0	0
Communist League Marxist-Leninist (Revolutionaries)	8,014	0.16	0	New
Other parties	1,307	0.03	0	0
Total	5,160,146	100.00	350	0
Valid votes	5,160,146	99.83		
Invalid/blank votes	8,850	0.17		
Total votes	5,168,996	100.00		
Registered voters/turnout	5,690,333	90.84		
Source: Nohlen & Stöver

=== Seat distribution ===
Constituency	Total seats	Seats won						
Constituency	Total seats	By party					By coalition	
Constituency	Total seats	S	C	M	F	V	Left	Right
Älvsborg North	9	4	3	1	1		4	5
Älvsborg South	7	3	2	2			3	4
Blekinge	7	3	2	1	1		3	4
Bohus	11	4	3	2	2		4	7
Fyrstadskretsen	21	10	4	4	2	1	11	10
Gävleborg	13	7	3	1	1	1	8	5
Gothenburg	20	8	3	3	4	2	10	10
Gotland	2	1	1				1	1
Halland	8	3	3	1	1		3	5
Jämtland	5	3	2				3	2
Jönköping	13	5	4	2	2		5	8
Kalmar	10	5	3	2			5	5
Kopparberg	13	6	4	1	1	1	7	6
Kristianstad	12	5	4	2	1		5	7
Kronoberg	7	3	3	1			3	4
Malmöhus	12	5	4	2	1		5	7
Norrbotten	11	6	2	1		2	8	3
Örebro	12	6	3	1	1	1	7	5
Östergötland	16	8	4	2	1	1	9	7
Skaraborg	11	4	4	2	1		4	7
Södermanland	11	5	2	1	1		5	4
Stockholm County	32	12	7	6	4	3	15	17
Stockholm Municipality	34	13	5	8	4	4	17	17
Uppsala	9	4	3	1	1		4	5
Värmland	12	6	3	1	1	1	7	5
Västerbotten	10	5	3	1	1		5	5
Västernorrland	12	6	3	1	1	1	7	5
Västmanland	12	6	3	1	1	1	7	5
Total	350	156	90	51	34	19	175	175
Source: Statistics Sweden

=== By municipality ===
Votes by municipality. The municipalities are the color of the party that got the most votes within the coalition that won relative majority.

Cartogram of the map to the left with each municipality rescaled to the number of valid votes cast.

Votes by municipality as a scale from red/Left-wing bloc to blue/Centre-right bloc.

Cartogram of vote with each municipality rescaled in proportion to number of valid votes cast. Deeper blue represents a greater relative majority for the centre-right coalition, brighter red represents a greater relative majority for the left-wing coalition.
