= Ulla Tillander =

Swedish politician (1931–1994)

Ulla Britta Tillander (née Olsson; 10 March 1931 – 16 November 1994) was a Swedish politician (Centre Party (Sweden)). She was a Member of Parliament from 1974 to 1994. She served as deputy minister of education and minister for schools from 1981 to 1982, and was a United Nations delegate. The Centre Party awarded her the Barmstorp plaque in 1994.

== Life ==
Tillander grew up in Gothenburg as the youngest of three girls. Her father was a crane operator. She trained as a teacher in Gothenburg, and then married Jan Tillander in 1954. The couple had four sons, and settled in Malmö.

After graduating as a special subjects teacher in Lund in 1964, specialising in Swedish and English, Tillander worked as a high school teacher in Malmö. She was a member of the Centre Party, and she was elected to the hospital board in 1968, and then stood successfully for the municipal council in 1971.

Tillander was deputy chair of the Centre Party's women's association from 1977 until 1984. She also held roles in the Swedish Church and on committees of national agencies. She was interested politically in housing issues, and education, social welfare and family policies, as well as church matters. Tillander believed that all children should be able to access schools, regardless of their social standing, and also an advocate for private schools and pre-schools.

Tillander was a United Nations delegate, and spoke out against genital mutilation, giving a speech on the practice in African countries. The Centre Party awarded her the Barmstorp plaque in 1994, their highest honour. Tillander resigned from parliament that year, dying soon after from colon cancer.
