= 1976 Swedish general election =

- 19 September 1976

All 349 seats in the Riksdag 175 seats needed for a majority
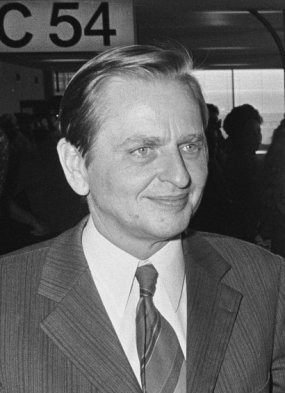

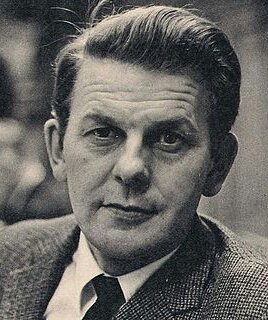

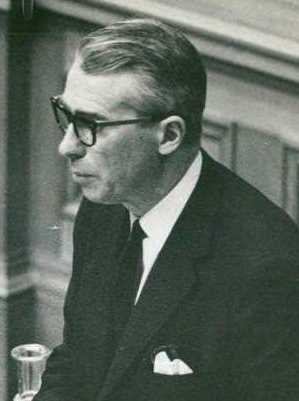

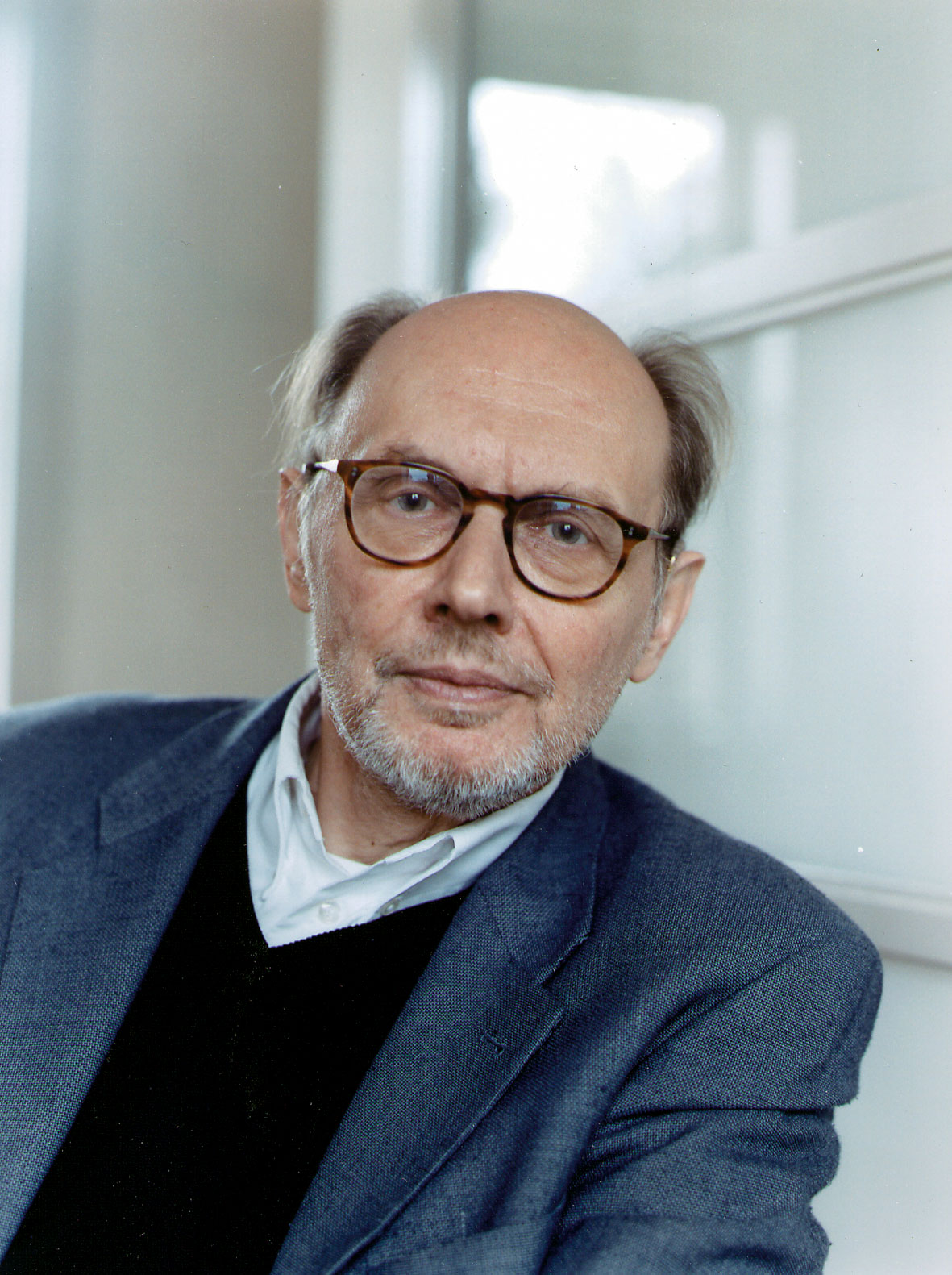

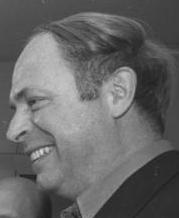
	First party	Second party	Third party
Leader	Olof Palme	Thorbjörn Fälldin	Gösta Bohman
Party	Social Democrats	Centre	Moderate
Last election	156	90	51
Seats won	152	86	55
Seat change	▼4	▼4	▲4
Popular vote	2,324,603	1,309,669	847,672
Percentage	42.75%	24.08%	15.59%
Swing	▼0.81 pp	▼1.02 pp	▲1.30 pp
	Fourth party	Fifth party
Leader	Per Ahlmark	Lars Werner
Party	People's Party	Left Communists
Last election	34	19
Seats won	39	17
Seat change	▲5	▼2
Popular vote	601,556	258,432
Percentage	11.06%	4.75%
Swing	▲1.64 pp	▼0.58 pp
- Map of the election, showing the distribution of constituency and levelling seats, as well as the largest political bloc within each constituency.
PM before election
Olof Palme
Social Democrats
Elected PM
Thorbjörn Fälldin
Centre

General elections were held in Sweden on 19 September 1976. Although the Swedish Social Democratic Party remained the largest party, winning 152 of the 349 seats in the Riksdag, a coalition government was formed with the Centre Party, the People's Party and the conservative Moderate Party (who won a combined 180 seats), which formed Sweden's first non-socialist government since 1936. Centre Party leader Thorbjörn Fälldin, who had widely been expected to take over the government in the previous election of 1973 (which turned out to bring a 175-175 draw between the left and right blocs), was appointed prime minister, the first not from the Swedish Social Democratic Party since Axel Pehrsson-Bramstorp's brief interregnum 40 years earlier.

== Debates ==
1976 Swedish general election debates
Date	Time	Organisers	Moderators	P Present I Invitee N Non-invitee					
Date	Time	Organisers	Moderators	S	C	M	L	V	Refs
1 September 1976				P Olof Palme	P Thorbjörn Fälldin	N Gösta Bohman	N Per Ahlmark	N Lars Werner	
		Sveriges Television	Lars Orup [sv]	P Olof Palme, Gunnar Sträng	P Thorbjörn Fälldin	P Gösta Bohman	P Per Ahlmark	P Lars Werner	

== Results ==
Party	Votes	%	Seats	+/–
Swedish Social Democratic Party	2,324,603	42.75	152	–4
Centre Party	1,309,669	24.08	86	–4
Moderate Party	847,672	15.59	55	+4
People's Party	601,556	11.06	39	+5
Left Party Communists	258,432	4.75	17	–2
Christian Democratic Unity	73,844	1.36	0	0
Communist Party	17,309	0.32	0	0
Other parties	4,663	0.09	0	0
Total	5,437,748	100.00	349	–1
Valid votes	5,437,748	99.65		
Invalid/blank votes	19,295	0.35		
Total votes	5,457,043	100.00		
Registered voters/turnout	5,947,077	91.76		
Source: Nohlen & Stöver

=== Seat distribution ===
Constituency	Total seats	Seats won						
Constituency	Total seats	By party					By coalition	
Constituency	Total seats	S	C	M	F	V	Right	Left
Älvsborg North	9	4	3	1	1		5	4
Älvsborg South	8	3	2	2	1		5	3
Blekinge	7	3	2	1	1		4	3
Bohus	11	4	3	2	2		7	4
Fyrstadskretsen	19	9	3	4	2	1	9	10
Gävleborg	13	6	3	1	1	2	5	8
Gothenburg	19	7	3	3	4	2	10	9
Gotland	2	1	1				1	1
Halland	9	3	3	2	1		6	3
Jämtland	5	3	2				2	3
Jönköping	13	5	4	2	2		8	5
Kalmar	11	5	3	2	1		6	5
Kopparberg	13	6	4	1	1	1	6	7
Kristianstad	12	5	4	2	1		7	5
Kronoberg	7	3	3	1			4	3
Malmöhus	11	5	3	2	1		6	5
Norrbotten	12	6	2	1	1	2	4	8
Örebro	11	6	3	1	1		5	6
Östergötland	18	8	4	3	2	1	9	9
Skaraborg	11	4	4	2	1		7	4
Södermanland	9	5	2	1	1		4	5
Stockholm County	33	12	6	7	5	3	18	15
Stockholm Municipality	32	12	4	8	4	4	16	16
Uppsala	10	4	3	1	1	1	5	5
Värmland	12	6	3	2	1		6	6
Västerbotten	10	5	3	1	1		5	5
Västernorrland	13	7	4	1	1		6	7
Västmanland	9	5	2	1	1		4	5
Total	349	152	86	55	39	17	180	169
Source: Statistics Sweden

=== By municipality ===
Votes by municipality. The municipalities are the color of the party that got the most votes within the coalition that won relative majority. Some municipalities have been split since 1976, so may be different to apparent results.

Cartogram of the map to the left with each municipality rescaled to the number of valid votes cast.

Map showing the voting shifts from the 1973 to the 1976 election. Darker blue indicates a municipality voted more towards the parties that formed the centre-right bloc. Darker red indicates a municipality voted more towards the parties that form the left-wing bloc.

Votes by municipality as a scale from red/Left-wing bloc to blue/Centre-right bloc.

Cartogram of vote with each municipality rescaled in proportion to number of valid votes cast. Deeper blue represents a relative majority for the centre-right coalition, brighter red represents a relative majority for the left-wing coalition.
