= 1970 Swedish general election =

← 1968	20 September 1970	1973 →

All 350 seats in the Riksdag 176 seats needed for a majority
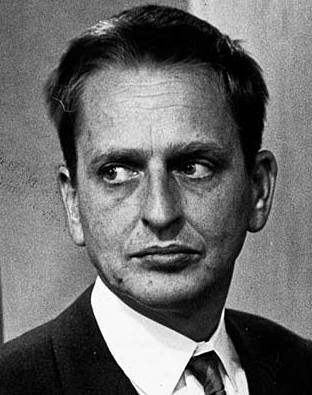

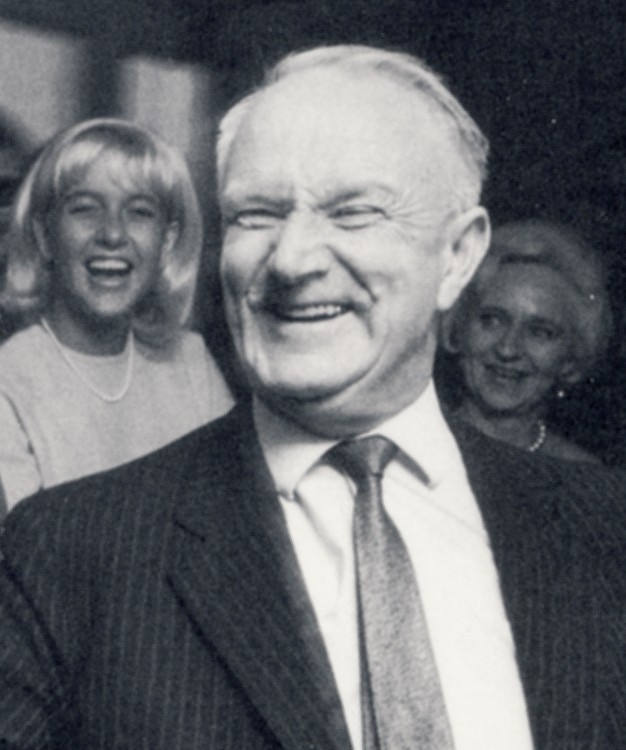

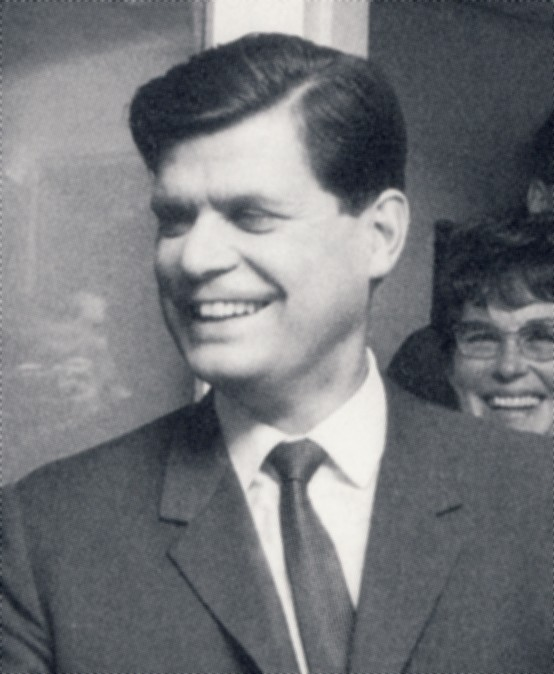

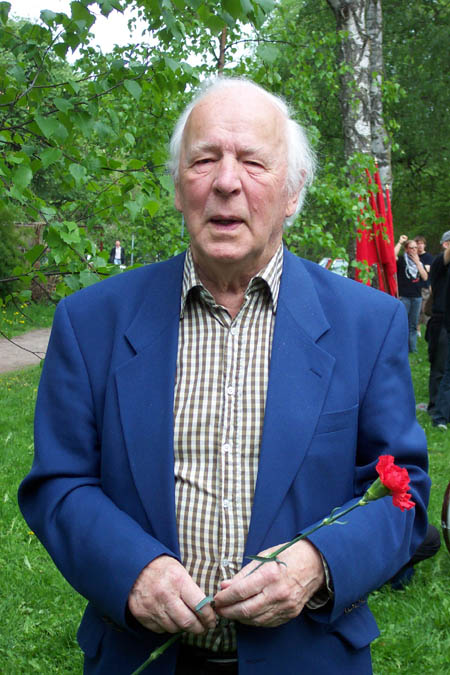
	First party	Second party	Third party
Leader	Olof Palme	Gunnar Hedlund	Gunnar Helén
Party	Social Democrats	Centre	Liberals
Last election	125 seats	39 seats	34 seats
Seats won	163	71	58
Seat change	▲38	▲32	▲24
Popular vote	2,256,369	991,208	806,667
Percentage	45.34%	19.92%	16.21%
Swing	▼4.78 pp	▲4.24 pp	▲1.95 pp
	Fourth party	Fifth party
Leader	Yngve Holmberg	C.-H. Hermansson
Party	Moderate	Left Communists
Last election	32 seats	3 seats
Seats won	41	17
Seat change	▲9	▲14
Popular vote	573,812	236,659
Percentage	11.53%	4.76%
Swing	▼1.33 pp	▲1.75 pp
- Map of the election, showing the distribution of constituency and levelling seats, as well as the largest political bloc within each constituency.
PM before election
Olof Palme
Social Democrats
Elected PM
Olof Palme
Social Democrats

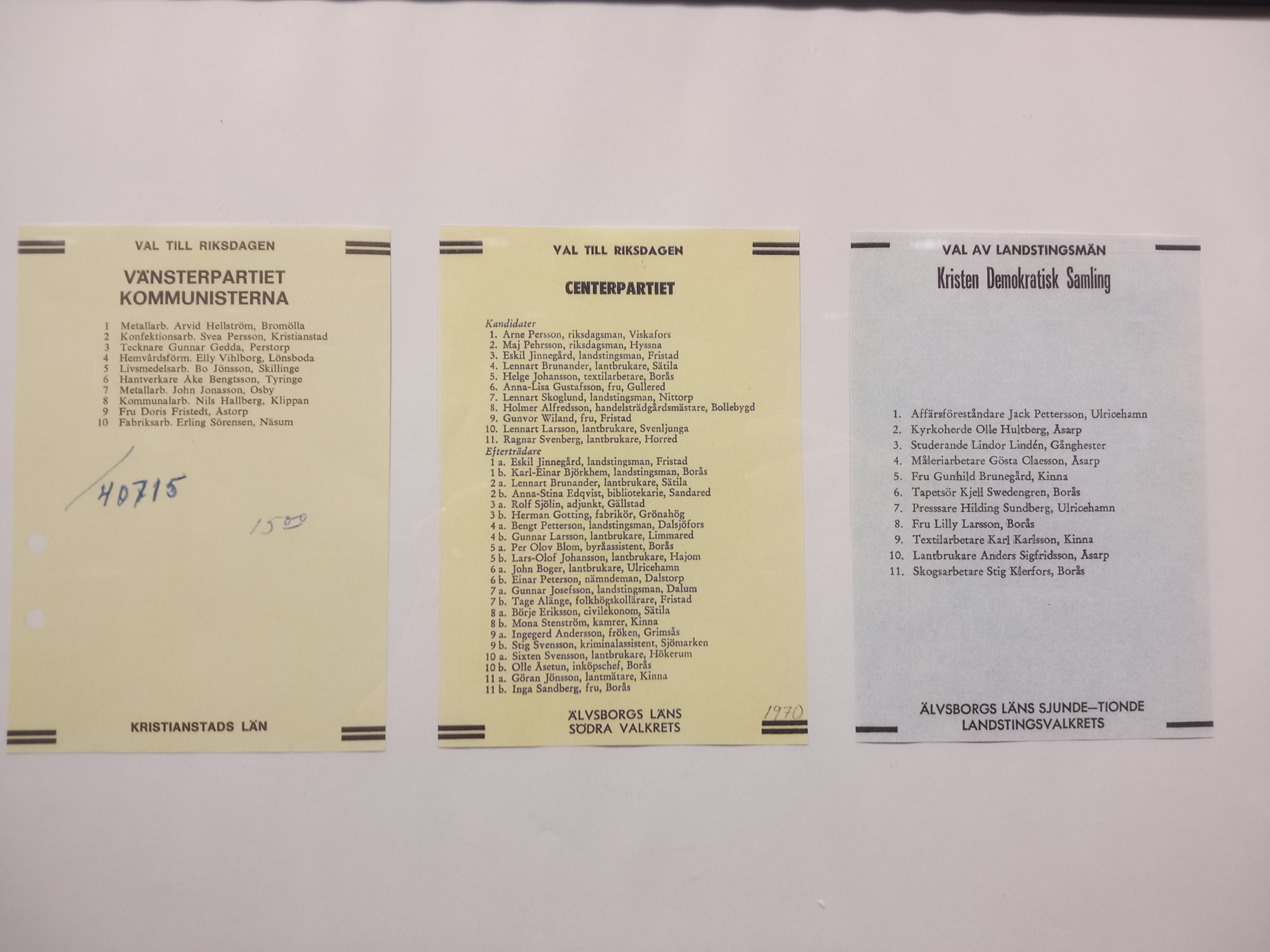
Examples of ballot papers used for 1970 Swedish general (yellow) and regional (blue) elections

General elections were held in Sweden on 20 September 1970, two years ahead of schedule because of the opening of the newly unicameral Riksdag. The Social Democratic remained the largest party, winning 163 of the 350 seats and gathered enough support to remain in power under its 1969 elected leader, Prime Minister Olof Palme.

== Results ==
Party	Votes	%	Seats	+/–
Swedish Social Democratic Party	2,256,369	45.34	163	+38
Centre Party	991,208	19.92	71	+32
People's Party	806,667	16.21	58	+24
Moderate Party	573,812	11.53	41	+9
Left Party Communists	236,659	4.76	17	+14
Christian Democratic Unity	88,770	1.78	0	0
Communist League Marxist–Leninist	21,238	0.43	0	New
Other parties	1,473	0.03	0	0
Total	4,976,196	100.00	350	+117
Valid votes	4,976,196	99.84		
Invalid/blank votes	8,011	0.16		
Total votes	4,984,207	100.00		
Registered voters/turnout	5,645,804	88.28		
Source: Nohlen & Stöver

=== Seat distribution ===
Constituency	Total seats	Seats won						
Constituency	Total seats	By party					By coalition	
Constituency	Total seats	S	C	F	M	V	Left	Right
Älvsborg North	9	4	2	2	1		4	5
Älvsborg South	7	3	2	1	1		3	4
Blekinge	6	4	1	1			4	2
Fyrstadskretsen	21	10	3	4	3	1	11	10
Gävleborg	13	7	3	1	1	1	8	5
Gothenburg and Bohus	10	4	2	3	1		4	6
Gothenburg Municipality	20	8	2	6	2	2	10	10
Gotland	2	1	1				1	1
Halland	8	3	3	1	1		3	5
Jämtland	5	3	2				3	2
Jönköping	13	5	4	2	2		5	8
Kalmar	11	5	3	1	2		5	6
Kopparberg	12	6	3	1	1	1	7	5
Kristianstad	12	5	3	2	2		5	7
Kronoberg	7	3	2	1	1		3	4
Malmöhus	11	5	3	2	1		5	6
Norrbotten	12	6	2	1	1	2	8	4
Örebro	12	6	2	2	1	1	7	5
Östergötland	17	9	3	2	2	1	10	7
Skaraborg	11	4	3	2	2		4	7
Södermanland	11	6	2	2	1		6	5
Stockholm County	28	12	4	6	4	2	14	14
Stockholm Municipality	36	15	4	7	6	4	19	17
Uppsala	8	4	2	1	1		4	4
Värmland	14	7	3	2	1	1	8	6
Västerbotten	10	5	2	2	1		5	5
Västernorrland	13	7	3	1	1	1	8	5
Västmanland	11	6	2	2	1		6	5
Total	350	163	71	58	41	17	180	170
Source: Statistics Sweden
