= Anne Wibble =

Swedish politician (1943–2000)

- Wibble in December 1999

Minister for Finance
- In office 4 October 1991 – 7 October 1994
- Prime Minister: Carl Bildt
- Preceded by: Allan Larsson
- Succeeded by: Göran Persson

Personal details
- Born: Anne Ohlin; 13 October 1943 Stockholm, Sweden
- Died: 14 March 2000 (aged 56) Stockholm, Sweden
- Party: Liberal People's
- Spouse: Jan Wibble (1966–2000)
- Children: 2

Anne Marie Wibble (née Ohlin; 13 October 1943 – 14 March 2000) was a Swedish politician who served as Minister for Finance from 1991 to 1994, the first woman to hold the post. She was a member of the Liberal People's Party. After leaving parliament in 1997, she as chief economist for the Federation of Swedish Industry. Wibble was the daughter of Bertil Ohlin, a 1977 Nobel Memorial Prize in Economic Sciences laureate.

== Early life and education ==
Wibble was born on 13 October 1943 . Her father was Bertil Ohlin, professor, former People's Party leader, and a 1977 Nobel Memorial Prize in Economic Sciences laureate.

Wibble graduated from the Stockholm School of Economics in 1966, then studied at Stanford University where she took an M.A. degree in 1967. In 1973 she took a licentiate degree in economics at the Stockholm School of Economics, where she also was a teacher from 1967 to 1977.

== Political career ==
Wibble worked for the Liberal People's Party in the Swedish government offices and the Swedish parliament from 1980 to 1986. She was a member of parliament from the 1985 election. In the 1991 election, a centre-right coalition won and Wibble was appointed Minister of Finance in the Bildt Cabinet. She was the first woman to hold the post. She stayed in office to the 1994 election, which the government lost. Wibble returned to parliament, and ran for party leader in 1995, but lost to Maria Leissner. She remained a member of parliament until the end of 1997, after which she became the chief economist of the Federation of Swedish Industry.

She died from breast cancer in 2000 in Stockholm. Wibble was married with two daughters.

| Preceded by Allan Larsson | Minister for Finance; 1991–1994 | Succeeded by Göran Persson |
