= Ingvar Rindborg =

Ingvar Axel Natanael Rindborg (8 April 1931 – 1 March 2016) was a Swedish banker.

Born in Stockholm in 1931, Ingvar Rindborg studied together with Tomas Tranströmer at Södra Latin Gymnasium. In 1962 he graduated as a civilekonom at the Gothenburg School of Business, Economics and Law, and went on to work at Gränges, Handelsbanken, and Götabanken before being hired as vice executive officer at Svenska sparbanksföreningen in 1975 where he stayed until 1981. He was also chaired and sat in the board of several companies, such as Investment AB Eken and Sifab.

He was brother to the politician and lawyer Stig Rindborg. His father was the commissioner Axel Eriksson.
