= Allan Larsson =

Swedish politician (born 1938)

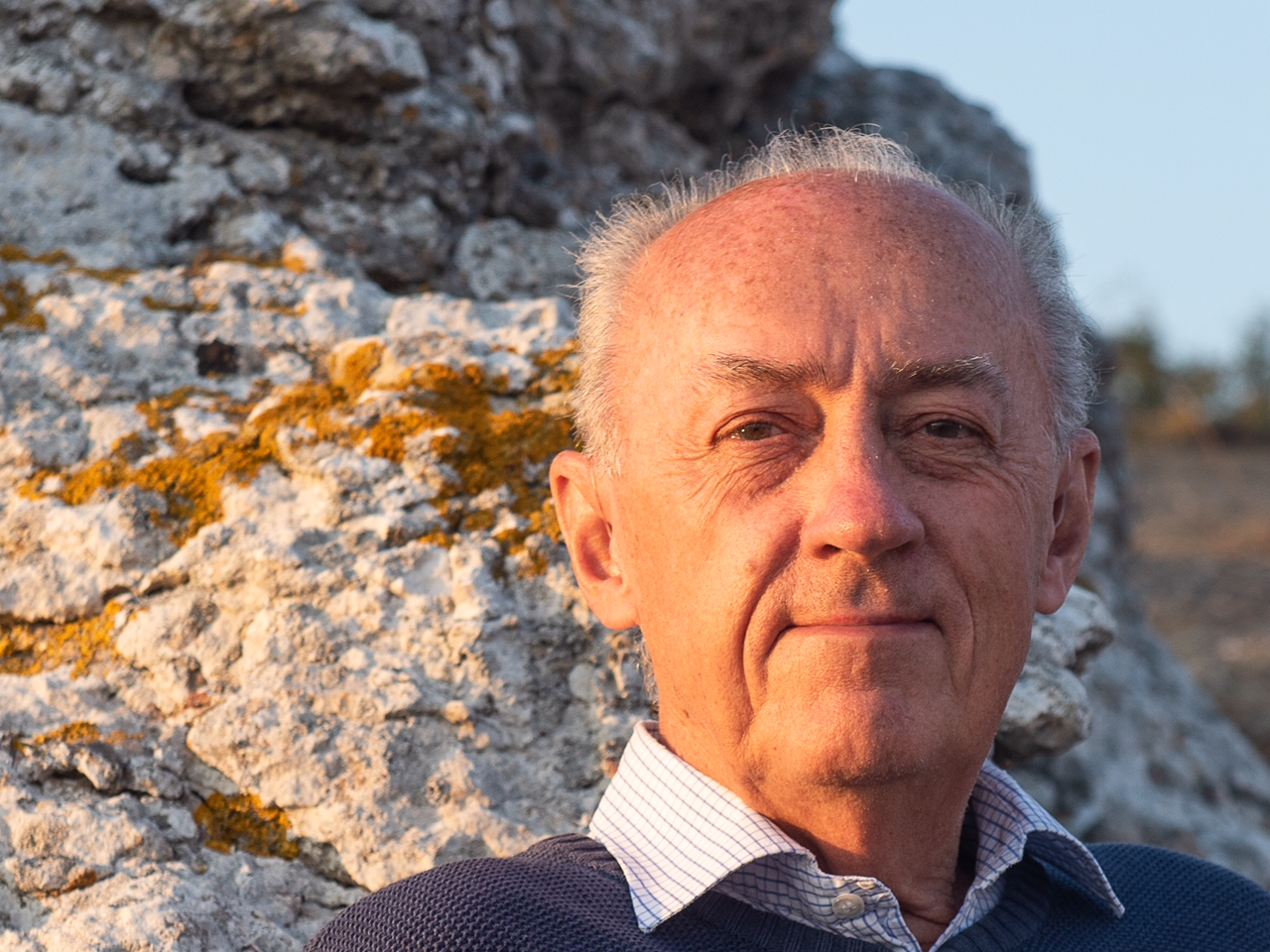

Minister for Finance
- In office 1990–1991

Member of the Riksdag
- In office 1991–1995

Personal details
- Born: 3 April 1938 (age 88)

Yngve Allan Gillis Larsson (born 3 April 1938) is a Swedish former Social Democratic politician. From 1990 to 1991 he served as Minister for Finance.

== Biography ==
From 1991 to 1995, he was a Member of the Swedish parliament Riksdag.

From Sweden's entry into the European Union in 1995 to 2000, Larsson served as Director General for DG Employment, Social Affairs and Equal Opportunities in the European Commission under commissioner Pádraig Flynn. Since 2003, he is chairman of the board of Lund University.

In January 2016, President of the European Commission Jean-Claude Juncker appointed Allan Larsson as a Special Adviser on the European Pillar of Social Rights.

| Preceded by Kjell-Olof Feldt | Minister for Finance; 1990–1991 | Succeeded by Anne Wibble |
