= Kenneth Lantz =

Swedish politician (born 1949)

Kenneth Lantz (born 1949) is a Swedish Christian democratic politician, member of the Riksdag 1991-1994 and again 1998–2006.

Kenneth Lantz first studied the Swedish law and later worked for an insurance company in Sweden.
