= Jörn Svensson =

Swedish politician (1936–2021)

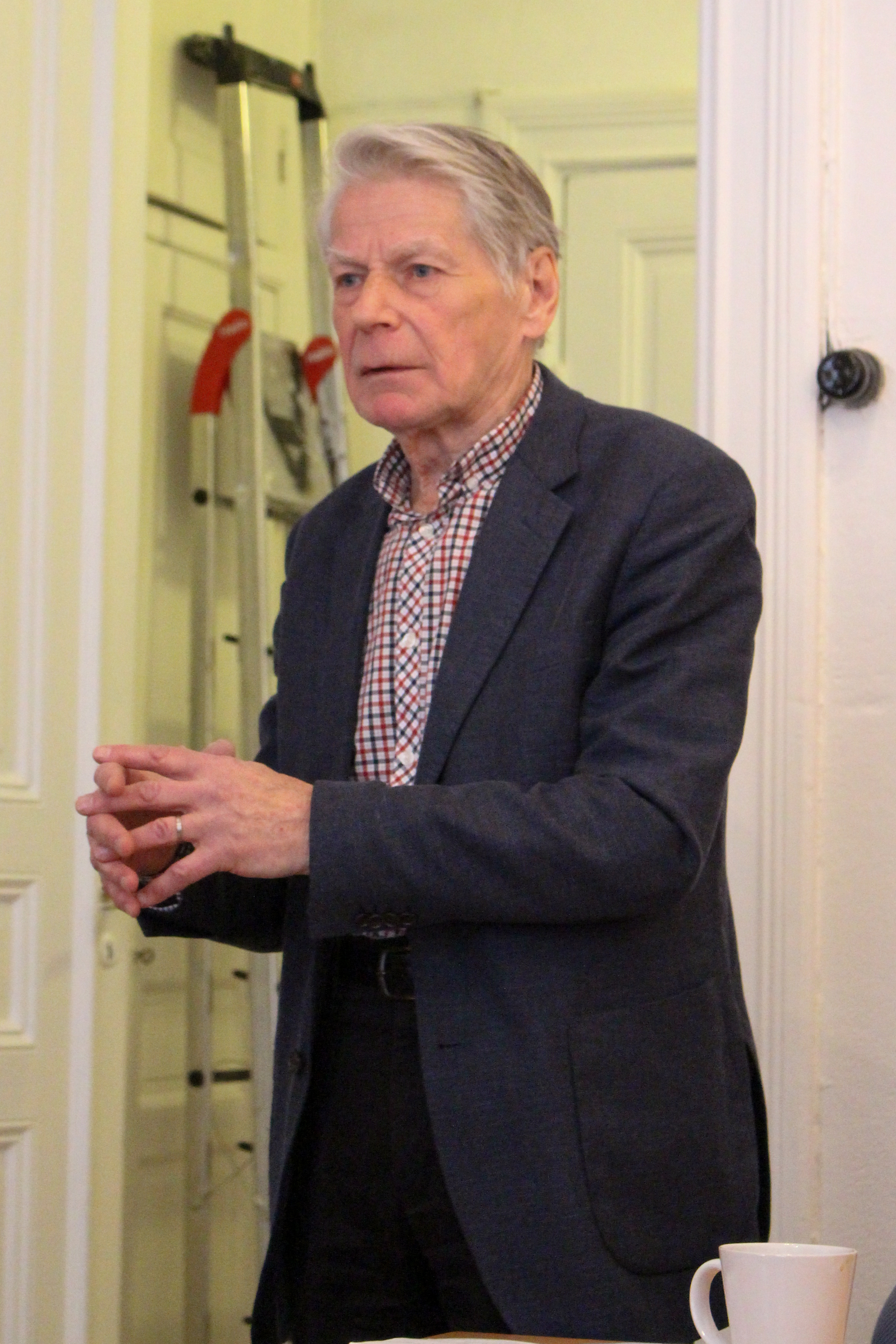

Member of the European Parliament
- In office 9 October 1995 – 19 July 1999

Member of the Riksdag
- In office 1971–1988

Personal details
- Born: 13 February 1936 Frederiksberg, Denmark
- Died: 12 November 2021 (aged 85)
- Party: V GUE/NGL

Jörn Svensson (13 February 1936 – 12 November 2021) was a Swedish politician. A member of the Left Party, he served in the Riksdag from 1971 to 1988 and the European Parliament from 1995 to 1999 as part of The Left in the European Parliament – GUE/NGL.
