= Olle Schmidt =

Swedish politician

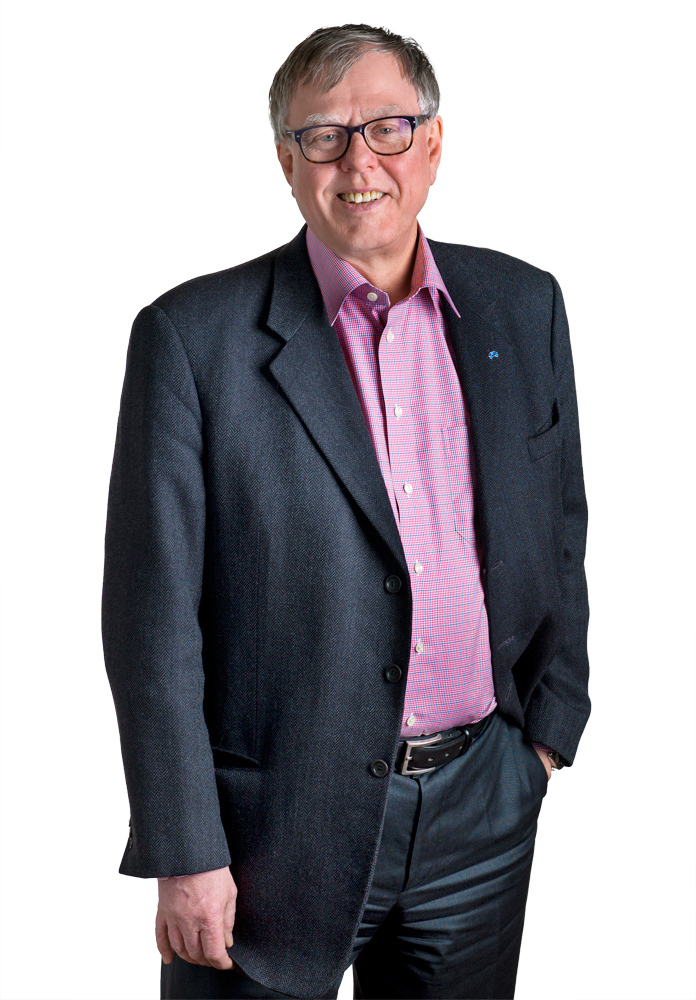
Schmidt in 2013

Torsten Olof "Olle" Fredrik Schmidt (born July 22, 1949 in Axvall, Västra Götaland County) is a Swedish politician. He served as a Member of the European Parliament for the Swedish Liberal People's Party, part of the Alliance of Liberals and Democrats for Europe, between 1999 and 2004, and again between 2006 and 2014.

== Education ==
Schmidt has a master's degree in literature, Nordic languages, history, politics and information from Lund University. He obtained his bachelor's from Lund University in 1972 and master's in 1974.

== Early career ==
At the end of the 1970s he worked as an ombudsman for the Swedish Liberal People's Party in the region of Scania.

From 1981 to 1982 Schmidt was the secretary of information for the then Ministry of Commerce and Industry under Minister of Commerce Björn Molin. For a short while he worked in the newspaper industry as the editorial writer for Göteborgs-Tidningen and the opinion editor at Göteborgs-Posten.

== Political career ==
During the 1980s Schmidt was politically active in the local politics of the City of Malmö. He sat in the local medical board, the social welfare board, the municipal government and the city council. From 1991 to 1994 he was a member of the Swedish Riksdag. Upon finishing his mandate, Schmidt returned to local and regional politics, where he was significant in the transformation of Scania from a county to a region, which is today known as Region Skåne.

In 1999, Schmidt's friend and political colleague Marit Paulsen encouraged him to stand for election to the European Parliament. During his first mandate, Schmidt engaged with the issues of human rights, immigration and refugee policies, equality and above all economic governance.

Schmidt lost his seat in European Parliament in the 2004 election and was replaced by Maria Carlshamre. After his defeat, Schmidt worked for the nationwide organization of the Liberal Party, until returning to the European Parliament in 2006 as Cecilia Malmström was appointed minister to the EU. As of then, Schmidt sits on the European Parliament's Committee on Economic and Monetary Affairs as vice coordinator for the Liberal group in the parliament (ALDE). He also sits as a substitute in the Committee on the Internal Market and Consumer Protection, as well as the Committee on Budget Control.

He is a member of the Temporary Committee on the alleged use of European countries by the CIA for the transport and illegal detention of prisoners and a member of the delegation for relations with Croatia. Schmidt has also been prolific in his role as a member and coordinator of the ACP–EU Joint Parliamentary Assembly.

In the European Parliament Schmidt has taken a keen interest in the issues of khat, customs duty, economics and financial legislation, entrepreneurship and protection of personal integrity. He is also one of the firmest proponents of a Swedish membership in the Eurozone. Schmidt has also involved himself actively in the case of the imprisonment of Swedish journalist Dawit Isaak in Eritrea, and has helped garner Swedish and European attention for his unlawful imprisonment.

For a long time, Olle Schmidt was a member of the Liberal People's Party Executive in Sweden, a mission he left during 2013. He has also been a part of the party leadership, and is active in Liberals International as well as holding the position of vice president of the ALDE party.

== Career ==
- Public relations officer, Scan Väst (Uddevalla shipyard, 1973, 1974–1977).
- Local secretary for the Liberal People's Party in Malmö (1977–1981).
- Press and information officer, Ministry of Commerce and Industry (1981–1982).
- Leader-writer/current-affairs commentator (Gothenburg, 1984–1985).
- Project officer (Malmö, 1989–1991); project leader (Kristianstad/Malmö, 1998–1999)
- Member of the Liberal People's Party executive (1995–1999).
- Local government affairs adviser (1983–1985) and policy adviser (1986–1988) in Malmö; substitute member of Malmö city executive board (1988–1991); leader of Malmö city council (1988–1997); various local government assignments (1986–1997).
- Member of the Riksdag (1991–1994). Substitute member of the Financial Affairs Committee and Housing Committee (1991–1994).
- Conducted various inquiries and studies in Malmö (1995–1998) and for central government (1989–1999).
