= Member of Parliament (Sweden) =

Member of the Swedish Parliament

Members of Parliament (Swedish: riksdagsledamöter, singular: riksdagsledamot) in Sweden sit in the Riksdag.

== Description ==
Members of Parliament (MPs) refers to the elected members of the Riksdag. In Swedish, an MP is usually referred to as a riksdagsledamot ("member of the Riksdag") or a riksdagsman ("Gentleman of the Riksdag"). The former is in more common use today, especially in official contexts, due to its status as a unisex word, while the latter was used more often historically and literally refers to a male MP exclusively.

The parliament is a unicameral assembly with 349 members who are chosen every four years in general elections. To become an MP, a person must be entitled to vote (i.e. be a Swedish citizen, be at least 18 years old and be or have been a resident in Sweden) and must be nominated by a political party. The MPs are elected by proportionality in constituencies across the nation. To decide which candidate will be elected, the modified Sainte-Laguë method is used. This method usually, but not always, gives an accurate result in proportion to cast votes. To get a more proportional result 39 MPs are elected at compensation mandate (Utjämningsmandat). The compensation mandates are distributed among constituencies based on voting figures, which means that the exact number of MPs that each constituency will elect is not known before the election.

The salaries of MPs are decided by the Riksdag Pay Committee (Riksdagens arvodesnämnd), an agency under the Riksdag. Since 1 January 2022 the basic monthly pay of an MP is SEK 71500. The pay of the Speaker is SEK 184000 per month, which is the same as that of the Prime Minister. The Deputy Speakers receive an increment of 30% of the pay of a member. The chairs and deputy chairs of the parliamentary committees receive a similar increment of 20% and 15% respectively.

According to a survey investigation by sociologist Jenny Hansson, Swedish national parliamentarians have an average workweek of 66 hours, including side responsibilities. Hansson's investigation further reports that the average Swedish national parliamentarian sleeps 6.5 hours per night.

== Lists ==
- List of members of the Riksdag, 2026–2030
- List of members of the Riksdag, 2022–2026
- List of members of the Riksdag, 2018–2022
- List of members of the Riksdag, 2014–2018
- List of members of the Riksdag, 2010–2014
- List of members of the Riksdag, 2006–2010
- List of members of the Riksdag, 2002–2006
- List of members of the Riksdag, 1998–2002
- List of members of the Riksdag, 1994–1998
- List of members of the Riksdag, 1991–1994

== See also ==
- Member of parliament
