= Jan Andersson (politician) =

Swedish politician (born 1947)

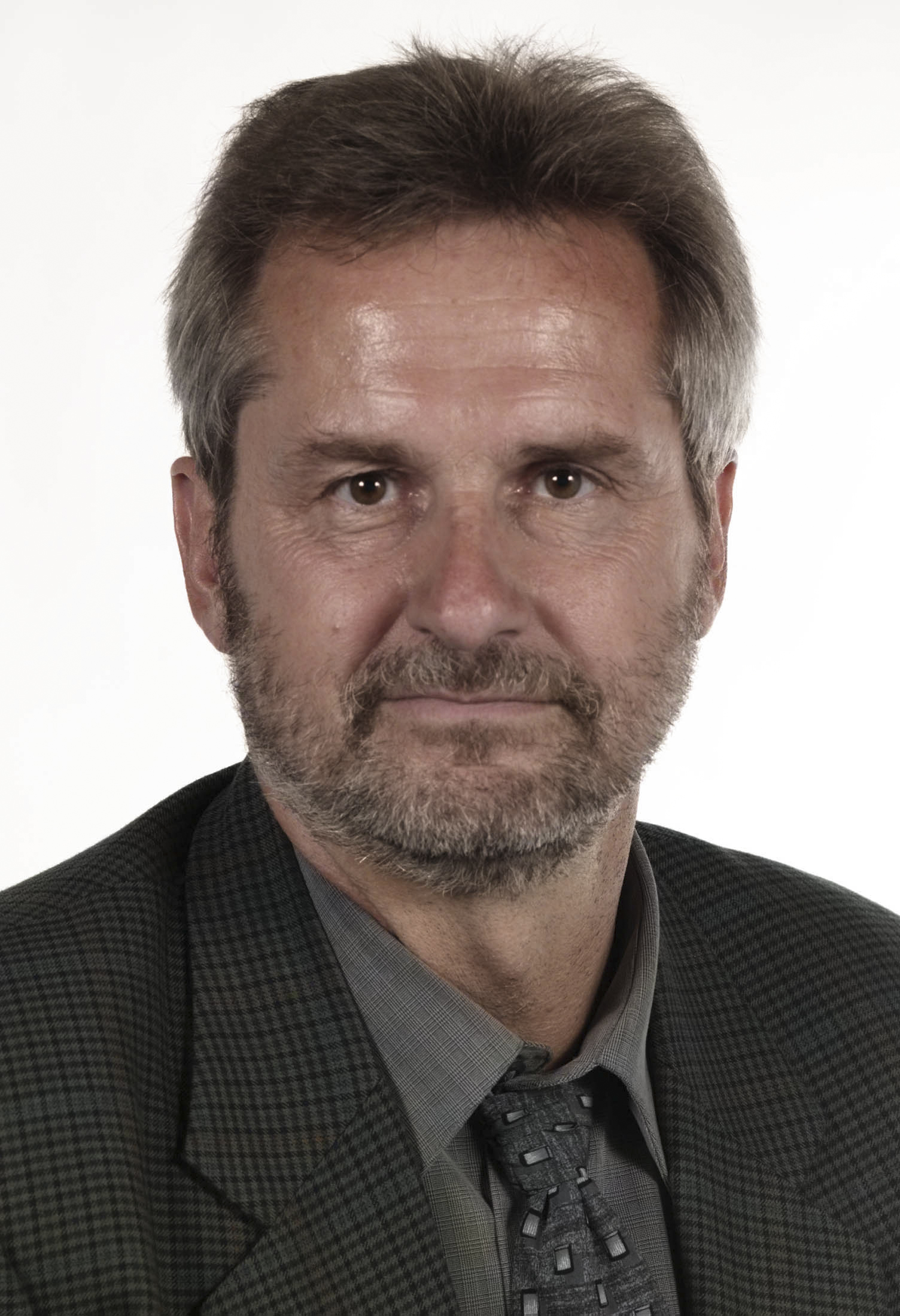
- Official portrait, 1999

Member of the European Parliament for Sweden
- In office 17 September 1995 – 2009

Personal details
- Born: 17 March 1947 (age 79) Helsingborg, Sweden
- Party: SAP
- Parent(s): Karl Torsten Börje Andersson and Brita Anna Sylvia Rosenkvist

Jan Andersson (born 17 March 1947) is a Swedish politician who has been a Member of the European Parliament (MEP) since 1995. He is a member of the Social Democratic Workers' Party of Sweden, which is part of the Party of European Socialists, and is vice-chair of the European Parliament's Committee on Employment and Social Affairs.

He is also a substitute for the Committee on Economic and Monetary Affairs, a substitute for the temporary committee on policy challenges and budgetary means of the enlarged Union 2007–2013, and a member of the delegation for relations with Japan.

== Career ==
- Advanced school-leaving certificate (1967)
- Intermediate-level teacher (1971)
- Teacher in Helsingborg (1972–1988)
- Member of Helsingborg municipal executive board (1982–1988)
- Chairman of Helsingborg Social Welfare Board (1983–1985, 1990)
- Member of the Swedish Parliament (1988–1995)
- Member of the Helsingborg Social Democratic Party executive (1979–1990)
- co-opted member of Skåne Social Democratic Party executive (since 1995)
- Co-opted member of the Social Democratic Party executive committee and party executive (since 2000)
- Member of the European Parliament since 1995

== Training ==
- Matriculation exam (1967)
- Middle school teacher qualification (1971)
- Middle school teacher (1972–1978)
- Subject teacher training (1978–1979)
- Subject teacher (1979–current)

== Assignments ==
=== Member of Parliament ===
- Ordinary member (2 October 1988 – 9 January 1995)
- Off duty (10 January 1995 – 8 October 1995)

=== European Parliament ===
- Member (1 January 1995 – 9 October 1995)
- Member (20 July 2004 – 14 July 2009)

=== Committee on Health and Welfare ===
- Member (17 January 1988 – 1 October 1988)
- Member (2 October 1988 – 29 September 1991)
- Deputy member (10 October 1988 – 16 January 1989)
- Member (29 September 1991 – 1 October 1994)
- Member (10 October 1994 – 18 January 1995)

=== Committee on Justice ===
- Deputy member (10 October 1988 – 29 September 1991)
- Deputy member (29 September 1991 – 1 October 1994)
- Deputy member (10 October 1994 – 18 January 1995)
