= Stig Rindborg =

Swedish politician (1929–2018)

Member of Riksdag
- In office 30 September 1991 – 30 September 2002

Personal details
- Born: September 30, 1929 Stockholm
- Died: July 17, 2018 (aged 88) Lidingö
- Party: Moderate Party
- Spouse(s): Sara Rindborg, born Björkström
- Children: Marika Rindborg Holmgren
- Relatives: Axel Eriksson (father) Ingvar Rindborg (brother)
- Occupation: Lawyer

Stig Axel Johannes Rindborg (30 September 1929 – 17 July 2018) was a Swedish politician, member of the Moderate Party, and lawyer. Rindborg was a Member of parliament in 1985, and 1991–2002. He has also held the title of President of the Stockholm County Council during the 1980s. As a member of parliament he served on the taxation, law and finance committees.

Aside from politics, Stig Rindborg drove a law firm, was chairman of the lobby organisation Företagarna and was a board member in several companies.

== Political career ==
- 1978 – 1981 – Management-committee chairman in Stockholm County Council
- 1985 – Member of Riksdag (Parliament)
- 1986 – 1988 – President of the Stockholm County Council
- 1991 – 2002 – Member of Riksdag (Parliament)
