= Margit Gennser =

Swedish politician and economist (1931–2024)

- Born: 15 November 1931; Helsingborg, Sweden
- Died: 2 July 2024 (aged 92)
- Occupations: Politician and economist
- Known for: Member of the Riksdag

Margit Gennser (15 November 1931 – 2 July 2024) was a Swedish Moderate Party politician and economist.

Siv Margit Gennser was born in Helsingborg to Carl Lööb and Gertrud Augustin, and married Gerhard Gennser in 1954. She graduated as economist from the Stockholm School of Economics in 1955. She served as a member of the Riksdag from 1982 to 2002.

Her books include Kostnads och intäktsanalysens ABC from 1965; further four books in cooperation with Lars O. Andersson, Företagets ekonomi (1967), Redovisa och bokföra (1968), Vägar för distribution (1969), and Frågor om skatt (1970); Arbetslivsorientering (part 1, 1973, and part 2, 1975, jointly with Lennart Sahlsten), Löntagaraktier eller fackföreningsfonder? (1976), and Kommunen betalar (1982).

Gennser died on 2 July 2024, at the age of 92.
