= Fyrstadskretsen (Andra kammaren constituency) =

Fyrstadskretsen ('Four City Constituency') was a constituency for election to the Andra kammaren (the lower chamber of the Swedish Riksdag) between 1921 and 1970 - covering the municipalities of Malmö, Helsingborg, Landskrona and Lund.

The constituency was set up ahead of the 1921 Swedish general election, under the name Malmö, Hälsingborgs, Landskrona och Lunds valkrets ('Electoral Constituency of Malmö, Hälsingborg, Landskrona and Lund'). At the time it was one of two constituencies in Malmöhus County. Prior to the 1921 elections, Malmö city had been a separate constituency whilst Helsingborg, Landskrona and Lund were part of the 'Three City Constituency' (Trestadskretsen).
