= Bertil Fiskesjö =

Swedish politician (1928–2019)

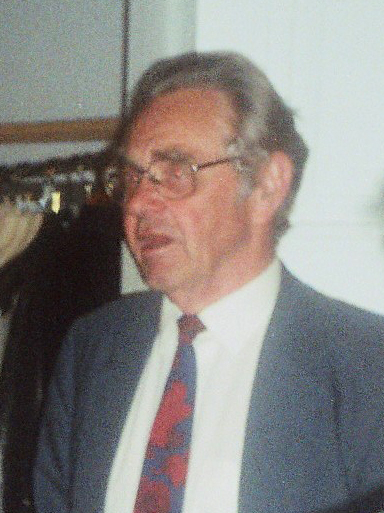
Fiskesjö in 2005

Bertil Fiskesjö (9 July 1928 – 30 November 2019) was a Swedish politician and a member of the Centre Party. Fiskesjö was born in Algutsboda, studied at Lund University, and became a university lecturer in political science.

He was a member of the Riksdag from 1971 to 1994. He was one of the four participants reaching the "Torekov Compromise" (Swedish: Torekovskompromissen), which settled the role of the Swedish monarchy as a ceremonial institution without any political powers. Fiskesjö later served as the Third Deputy Speaker of the Riksdag from 1986 to 1994.
